= KAZT-TV =

Television station in Prescott, Arizona

KAZT-TV and KAZT-CD

KAZT-TV: Prescott, Arizona; KAZT-CD: Phoenix, Arizona; United States
- Channels for KAZT-TV: Digital: 7 (VHF); Virtual: 7
- Channels for KAZT-CD: Digital: 36 (UHF); Virtual: 7
- Branding: CW7 Arizona; MORE! Arizona (7.2)

Programming
- Affiliations: 7.1: The CW; 7.2: Independent; for others, see § Technical information and subchannels

Ownership
- Owner: Londen Media Group; (KAZT, L.L.C.)
- Operator: Nexstar Media Group
- Sister stations: Tegna: KPNX

History
- First air date: KAZT-TV: September 5, 1982; KAZT-CD: April 22, 1986
- Former call signs: KAZT-TV: KNAZ (CP, 1980); KUSK (1980–2002); KAZT-CD: KAZT-CA (2002–2010)
- Former channel number: KAZT-TV: Analog: 7 (VHF, 1982–2009); Digital: 25 (UHF, until 2009); KAZT-CD: Analog: 22 (1986–1992); Digital: 27 (UHF, 2007–2009)
- Former affiliations: Independent (1982–2024, now on DT2 and CD2)
- Call sign meaning: Arizona Television (station branded as AZ-TV from 2002 to 2024)

Technical information
- Licensing authority: FCC
- Facility ID: KAZT-TV: 35811; KAZT-CD: 72618
- Class: KAZT-CD: CD
- ERP: KAZT-TV: 3.2 kW; KAZT-CD: 15 kW
- HAAT: KAZT-TV: 792 m (2,598 ft); KAZT-CD: 517.5 m (1,698 ft)
- Transmitter coordinates: KAZT-TV: 34°41′15″N 112°7′3.5″W; KAZT-CD: 33°20′2″N 112°3′43″W
- Translator: see § Translators

Links
- Public license information: KAZT-TV: Public file; LMS; KAZT-CD: Public file; LMS
- Website: cw7az.com

KAZT-TV (channel 7) is a television station licensed to Prescott, Arizona, United States, serving as the Phoenix market's outlet for The CW. The station is locally owned by the Londen family of Phoenix and managed by Nexstar Media Group, whose Tegna subsidiary owns NBC affiliate KPNX (channel 12). KAZT-TV maintains studios on Tower Road in Prescott and in the Londen Center on Camelback Road in Phoenix. Its main transmitter is located atop Mingus Mountain (northeast of Prescott). Its signal is relayed through a network of five low-power translators across central and northern Arizona, including Class A station KAZT-CD, which is licensed directly to Phoenix.

A construction permit for channel 7 in Prescott was approved in 1980. The first owner, William H. Sauro, unsuccessfully sought a network affiliation for the station, but by late 1981, he had switched to envisioning it as a springboard for a national network of translators. KUSK debuted on September 5, 1982; it aired limited local programming but was primarily recognized in the market for classic TV series and a heavy sports schedule. KUSK began extending its reach by a series of low-power translators in the Phoenix area, Flagstaff, and Yuma, but it was not available on Phoenix's largest cable system until 1993. The station declared bankruptcy in 1997 and was almost sold to Harry Pappas to become an affiliate of the new Azteca América Spanish-language network.

After the sale to Pappas failed, the Londen family—owners of a life insurance company in Phoenix—acquired KUSK and overhauled the operation. The station was renamed as KAZT-TV on April 2, 2002. It remained an independent station with syndicated programming for Phoenix and Northern Arizona as well as some local shows and sports telecasts. In 2024, Nexstar assumed operational control of KAZT under a time brokerage agreement with Londen and moved the CW affiliation from a subchannel of KNXV-TV.

== History ==
=== KUSK: Early years ===
William H. Sauro obtained a construction permit from the Federal Communications Commission (FCC) on January 7, 1980, for a new television station on channel 7 to serve Prescott. The permit briefly carried the KNAZ call letters; during this time, Sauro sought a network affiliation for the new outlet and was ultimately denied by ABC, which felt it had adequate reach into Northern Arizona. Sauro also talked to CBS, which he considered more of a longshot because KOOL-TV, the Phoenix CBS affiliate, already had translators in several Northern Arizona communities. On September 29, 1980, the call letters were changed to KUSK (the KNAZ call letters were assigned to a station in Flagstaff the following year). Ground was broken on the station's Prescott studios in November 1981, by which time Sauro's plans had dramatically changed. Sauro partnered with a cable TV consultant to propose a "Neighborhood Television" network of more than 140 low-power translators in major markets across the country to air KUSK's programming; this would have cost $15 to $20 million to build. The Neighborhood translators and program format for KUSK would have consisted of shows aimed at rural American audiences; Sauro described the theme as "the U.S., the greatest 'country' in the world".

KUSK first signed on the air on September 5, 1982. Its program lineup was designed with the older demographics of Yavapai County in mind. It initially produced local news and sports programming for northern Arizona. The station launched with a nightly newscast anchored by Max Smith, a retired KOOL-TV newscaster and Prescott resident; the weather forecast was presented by a professor at Embry-Riddle Aeronautical University. The station also had a local information program on Saturdays, The Carol Adams Show. However, a wave of layoffs in 1985 saw the station discontinue the newscast and other local programming, which included Yavapai College basketball and Bradshaw Mountain High School football; in addition, KUSK ceased making commercials for other clients.

=== KUSK comes to Phoenix ===
In 1985, Arizona Metro Television, Ltd., in which Sauro was a partner, acquired a Phoenix low-power TV station, K27AN, from the Meredith Corporation, owners of KPHO-TV (channel 5); Meredith had opted not to build and program the station itself and sold it. On April 22, 1986, the station began rebroadcasting KUSK's programming into the Phoenix area. By this time, KUSK programming included a heavy slate of summer baseball games, including the Oakland Athletics and California Angels, as well as the music video service Hit Video USA.

Sauro obtained two further translators, K55EH from Shaw Butte and K17BU on Usery Mountain, and signed them on in early 1988, creating a "synthetic full-power station" with the ability to target advertising to smaller sections of the Phoenix metropolitan area. In 1990, K27AN ceased airing KUSK's non-sports programming and began broadcasting the Home Shopping Network (HSN), which Sauro claimed was due to viewer demand. In 1992, K27AN was converted to run home shopping programming full-time, with KUSK broadcasting through channels 17 and 55. That October, the station began broadcasting on a translator in Flagstaff.

KUSK also held construction permits for another two translators, channel 43 in Casa Grande and channel 19 in Yuma. The Casa Grande translator launched in 1994, as did coverage in Mohave County. The Yuma translator was the last to come on air, beginning broadcasts in 1995; within a year, Yuma viewers accounted for 10 percent of KUSK's audience. In Phoenix, it took years for KUSK to gain market-wide cable coverage. In 1993, it finally succeeded in reaching a deal with Dimension Cable (now Cox Communications), the largest cable provider in the market; however, it was only added to rebuilt areas of the cable system, which was not complete until 1996. The station's sports rights had broadened beyond baseball to include Arizona Wildcats basketball and Northern Arizona University and Brigham Young University athletics. In the 1990s, KUSK aired a talk show hosted by Sam Steiger.

On December 5, 1997, KUSK, Inc., filed for Chapter 11 bankruptcy, while the company reorganized. Sauro triggered the reorganization filing in order to end 18 months of litigation among the firm's shareholders, in spite of what he called the station's best year ever financially. KUSK emerged from bankruptcy in May 2000 and reached a $6.8 million deal later that year to sell the station to Harry Pappas, who would have relaunched KUSK as an Azteca América affiliate. Money problems, however, forced delays in the launch of Azteca América and scuttled most of the network's planned purchases and affiliate switches.

=== KAZT-TV: The Londen years ===
On November 30, 2001, KUSK reached an agreement to sell the station to the Londen family, owners of the Illinois-based Lincoln Heritage Life Insurance Company. The new owners immediately hired Ron Bergamo—formerly of KSAZ-TV and later KWBA-TV in Tucson—as general manager to run the station. They officially took control of KUSK and its translator network on April 1, 2002. The day after the Londen Group closed on its purchase, it relaunched the station with new call letters: KAZT-TV. It also adopted a new brand, AZ-TV. The move came with a comprehensive management, technical, and programming overhaul. To help ensure that KAZT would "do some good for Arizona", the Londen family put together an advisory board of notable Arizonans, including Governor Jane Dee Hull, U.S. Representative Bob Stump, prominent local auto dealer Lou Grubb, Jerry Colangelo of the Phoenix Suns and Arizona Diamondbacks, and Michael Bidwill of the Arizona Cardinals. Company patriarch Jack Londen later said that he had bought the station as a 50th anniversary gift for his wife, Dodie.

Three weeks later, on April 22, the station launched a new slate of local programming, including several talk shows (one hosted by longtime Valley broadcaster Pat McMahon) and a radio show simulcast from KTAR; the new programs were split between the existing Prescott studio and a new studio in Phoenix. KAZT also acquired a slate of Arizona State University athletic events, and it returned its programming to channel 27 from the two-transmitter setup. In addition, KAZT began airing The Best of Wallace and Ladmo, a compilation of highlights from the long-running local children's show that McMahon co-hosted. Bergamo continued to run the station until he was killed in a car accident in 2008.

During the 2000s, the station served as a telecast outlet for various secondary sports. It picked up overflow events from Fox Sports Arizona as well as Phoenix Mercury women's basketball and preseason rights to Arizona Cardinals football. In 2006, the station became the new broadcast home of the Phoenix Coyotes of the National Hockey League; in the 2008–09 season, the station carried 20 games, and Fox Sports Arizona became the team's sole TV home in 2009. In 2010, the station broadcast eight arena football games of the Arizona Rattlers.

The 2000s also saw several changes to the station's transmitters. K19CX in Yuma was required to drop KAZT programming on December 4, 2006, due to syndication exclusivity issues with other stations within that separate market and the increasing prevalence of syndicated fare on KAZT's schedule. It became a repeater of KAET (channel 8), the PBS station in Phoenix, and was sold directly to Arizona State University in 2013.

After KUTP (channel 45) signed on its digital signal on channel 26, its permanent allocation, KAZT-CA began to experience adjacent channel signal interference. The station requested special temporary authority (STA) to shut off its analog signal and begin operating its digital signal on the same channel (called a "flash cut"). The FCC granted the STA on August 16, 2007, and KAZT-CA began broadcasting in digital on January 15, 2008. On August 4, 2008, KAZT-CA applied to move its signal to channel 36, citing displacement due to continuing interference from KUTP. The FCC granted the displacement application on September 10, 2009, and on December 7, KAZT-CA ended broadcasts on channel 27, commencing operations on channel 36 five days later.

=== Nexstar operation and affiliation with The CW ===
On January 8, 2024, it was announced that KAZT-TV would become the new Phoenix-area affiliate for The CW, effective February 1, 2024, as part of a time brokerage deal with the network's majority owner, Nexstar Media Group. The time brokerage agreement began on January 5, 2024, and runs for an eight-year term. The relocation of the CW affiliation came three months after the network experienced a change in its Phoenix-market outlet. The previous November, the E. W. Scripps Company, owner of longtime CW affiliate KASW (channel 61) and ABC affiliate KNXV-TV, moved CW programming from KASW to a subchannel of KNXV-TV in order to air Coyotes hockey games on channel 61.

== Local programming ==
On weekday mornings, KAZT-TV airs Arizona Daily Mix, produced from Phoenix and hosted by former KTVK anchor Brad Perry; the station had previously aired a morning show known as Morning Scramble. Since at least 2009, the station has aired a live broadcast of the Catholic Mass from Cathedral of Saints Simon and Jude in Phoenix on Sundays.

Nexstar announced on July 22, 2026, that a 9 p.m. newscast would begin to air on KAZT in mid-August without providing additional details at the time of the announcement. Tegna-owned NBC affiliate KPNX began producing 12News on CW7 Arizona for KAZT-TV on August 15.

== Technical information and subchannels ==
KAZT-TV broadcasts to the Prescott area from a transmitter on Mingus Mountain. KAZT-CD broadcasts from South Mountain. Both stations offer the same subchannels:

Subchannels of KAZT-TV and its translators
Subchannel	Res.	Short name	Programming
7.1	720p	KAZT	The CW
7.2	720p	MORE!AZ	Independent
7.3	480i	Rewind	Rewind TV
7.4	720p	Charge	Charge!
7.5	720p	QVC	QVC

On October 13, 2008, KAZT-DT and KAZT-CA launched their first additional subchannel, featuring the Retro Television Network (RTV). On June 20, 2011, KAZT added MeTV.

=== Analog-to-digital conversion ===
On February 22, 2001, the station was granted a construction permit to build its digital companion channel on UHF channel 25, and in October 2002, after receiving a grant of special temporary authority (STA) to operate at roughly the same service level as its analog station, KAZT-DT came on the air. The station made its temporary operations permanent in August 2006, and on October 17, 2006, it was licensed. KAZT-TV shut down its analog signal, over VHF channel 7, on May 15, 2009; the station's digital signal then moved from UHF channel 25 to VHF channel 7.

=== Translators ===
In addition to KAZT-CD in Phoenix, KAZT-TV is relayed on the following translators in northern Arizona:

- Bullhead City: K24DK-D
- Flagstaff: K30DT-D
- Kingman: K20ID-D
- Lake Havasu City: K17DA-D
