= Pat McMahon (actor) =

American actor (born 1935)

- Born: 20 August 1935 (age 90); Leavenworth, Kansas, U.S.
- Occupations: actor, radio executive and disc jockey
- Known for: The Wallace and Ladmo Show

John Patrick Michael "Pat" McMahon (born August 20, 1935) is an American actor and broadcaster, best known for his portrayal of numerous characters on The Wallace and Ladmo Show, a daily children's variety show broadcast on KPHO-TV in Phoenix. McMahon is also a longstanding fixture on the Phoenix broadcasting scene, where he has worked at KRIZ, KOY, and KTAR radio stations—serving as program director, disc jockey, and talk-show host, among other positions.

== Personal life ==
McMahon was born to vaudeville performers, Jack and Adelaide McMahon—billed as "McMahon and Adelaide" At age five, he joined the act and spent 12 years touring the world. The family eventually settled in Davenport, Iowa, where McMahon attended high school and St. Ambrose College.

He has been married to Duffy McMahon, a psychotherapist, for over thirty years and lives in suburban Phoenix.

== Career ==
McMahon's broadcasting career began while he was in college when he took a job as a disc jockey at Davenport radio station KSTT. His career was interrupted by a stint in the Army, beginning in 1958.

He had gained some television experience while in the service and, after he was discharged, decided to try to break into the business in Phoenix. In 1960, he began working at KPHO-TV in a variety of capacities. At that time, It's Wallace had already been on the air six years—hosted by Wallace (Bill Thompson) and Ladmo (Ladimir Kwiatkowski). They decided they needed a third person to play various characters in the skits they performed between cartoons, and McMahon was incorporated into the show. His most memorable role was as Gerald, a wealthy, spoiled boy who was ostensibly the station manager's nephew.

By the time Wallace and Ladmo, as it came to be known, went off the air almost 30 years later, McMahon had played dozens of characters, including "Boffo the Clown, a clown who hated children; Marshall Good, the cowboy from New Jersey who always bummed quarters from kids; Captain Super, the right-wing superhero that needed a night-light to sleep; and Aunt Maud, the senior citizen that told twisted fairy tales." One character, Hub Kapp, received national attention as the lead singer of Hub Kapp and the Wheels (also featuring Wallace and Ladmo regular Mike Condello). The band recorded several singles and made appearances on Tonight Starring Steve Allen and The Joey Bishop Show.

McMahon played the role of Marvin P. Fassbender in Orson Welles' The Other Side of the Wind.

Currently, McMahon continues to work in radio and television for KTAR and AZTV.

== Awards ==
- Regional Emmys
- The Arizona Music & Entertainment Hall of Fame
- The Arizona Broadcasters Association Hall of Fame
- The Herberger Theater Hall of Fame (2001)
- Edward R Murrow Award
- International Broadcasting Gold Medal
- Honorary Doctorate, Ottawa University
- Radio Program Director of the Year (1970)
- Los Angeles Recording Industry Man of the Year (1969)
- Named an Arizona Historymaker by the Arizona Historical League
