= Channel 61 =

Channel 61 may refer to:

- Channel 61 (New Zealand TV channel), a regional television station based in Taupo, New Zealand
- RTV (Indonesian TV network), a local television station in Cikarang, Indonesia on UHF channel 61

== United States ==
The following television stations, which are no longer licensed, formerly broadcast on analog channel 61:

- KQCT-LP in Davenport, Iowa
- WKBF-TV, an independent television station in Cleveland, Ohio
- WLPN-LP (defunct), a low-power television station in New Orleans, Louisiana

== See also ==
- Channel 61 branded TV stations in the United States
- Channel 61 virtual TV stations in the United States
