= KPAZ-TV =

Television station in Phoenix, Arizona

- Phoenix, Arizona; United States
- Channels: Digital: 20 (UHF); Virtual: 21

Programming
- Affiliations: 21.1: TBN; for others, see § Subchannels

Ownership
- Owner: Trinity Broadcasting Network; (Trinity Broadcasting of Arizona, Inc.)

History
- First air date: September 16, 1967
- Former channel numbers: Analog: 21 (UHF, 1967–2009)
- Former affiliations: Independent (1967–1977)
- Call sign meaning: Phoenix, Arizona; (also paz, Spanish for "peace")

Technical information
- Licensing authority: FCC
- Facility ID: 67868
- ERP: 1,000 kW
- HAAT: 489 m (1,604 ft)
- Transmitter coordinates: 33°20′2.6″N 112°3′44.5″W

Links
- Public license information: Public file; LMS
- Website: www.tbn.org

KPAZ-TV (channel 21) is a religious television station in Phoenix, Arizona, United States, owned by the Trinity Broadcasting Network (TBN). The station's transmitter is located atop South Mountain on the city's south side.

Channel 21 in Phoenix was built by Spanish Language Television of Arizona, Inc., and began broadcasting on September 16, 1967. It was the first ultra high frequency (UHF) station in the state and featured a format of specialty sports programs, daytime automated news, and Spanish-language and other local programming. The original owner went bankrupt less than two years after putting KPAZ-TV on the air; in 1970, Glad Tidings Church filed to buy the station and immediately became active in its management even before it was approved to complete the purchase. Even though Glad Tidings struggled to find its economic footing, it built new studios and invested in additional equipment for channel 21.

However, the debts accumulated by Glad Tidings became too great to ignore. In December 1975, TBN agreed to buy KPAZ-TV from Glad Tidings and pay operating expenses. The original deal fell apart when the church tried to renegotiate the terms of the sale. On January 19, 1977, RCA, one of Glad Tidings's creditors, seized its equipment and forced the station off the air; questions were also raised about the church's ability to honor savings certificates it had sold to finance operations. TBN bought KPAZ-TV and put it back on the air that September; it was the second television station owned by the ministry.

== History ==
=== Spanish Language Television of Arizona ===
On February 10, 1965, Spanish Language Television of Arizona, Inc., filed with the Federal Communications Commission (FCC) to build a new station on channel 14 in Phoenix. A January 1966 article stated that the station had already secured an affiliation with the Spanish International Network and planned to begin broadcasts by Labor Day of that year. In May, after the FCC overhauled the UHF table of allocations, SLTA amended its application to specify channel 21, as well as a studio location at 16th Street and Buckeye Road in Phoenix. Plans also included the commissioning of a repeater to expand the station's coverage to include Tucson within a year of signing on.

By early 1967, the station had set a June sign-on date, and several other details had changed. KPAZ would instead build its studios as part of the expansion of the Tower Plaza shopping center, and it also announced plans to air a ticker-tape of Associated Press newswire during the daytime hours. The station would sign on the air September 16, 1967—Mexican Independence Day—as Arizona's first full-power UHF station. Channel 21's formal opening included dignitaries such as Governor Jack Williams, Senator Barry Goldwater and Phoenix mayor Milton H. Graham.

KPAZ began its life as a bilingual independent station, with a mix of SIN-supplied entertainment programs (primarily from Mexico) in Spanish and news and sports programs in English; Thomson hoped to start four other stations like KPAZ nationwide. The station's Spanish-language programs also included Hoy en Phoenix, the Valley's first Spanish-language television newscast, anchored by Ivo Luis Alonso, former senior Latin American editor for Voice of America.

In sports, KPAZ's primary draw was weekly bullfighting telecasts from Mexico, which were important enough to the station that a bull was incorporated into its logo but also made the new station a lightning rod for controversy. A handful of irate local residents accused the station of being run by Communists. KPAZ also aired English-language entertainment shows, including Arizona State Sun Devils football highlights, and the syndicated music program Upbeat. The station also produced local and alternative programming. KRIZ DJ Tony Evans hosted a dance and music show on Fridays; a Saturday night talk show known as Basharoonie, hosted by Jim Spero, appeared in early 1969.

Despite its ambitious plans and counterprogramming, KPAZ made no headway against established independent KPHO-TV (channel 5). By early 1969, pressure from advertisers had resulted in the bullfighting being phased out of KPAZ's schedule. In August, less than two years after signing on, SLTA filed for bankruptcy, a lengthy process that lasted nearly two years for channel 21. One of the largest creditors was RCA Victor, from which KPAZ had bought broadcast equipment but never made more than the down payment. In October, a judge rejected channel 21's proposal for a trustee, instead naming Julius Altschul to the post. An interim investor in channel 21, the Scottsdale-based Music and Entertainment Co., made a $225,000 offer to buy the station, which RCA contested.

=== Glad Tidings Church ===
On June 3, 1970, federal bankruptcy referee Hugh Caldwell approved channel 21's sale to the Glad Tidings Church for $400,000, contingent on FCC approval. Compared to the purchase price, RCA was owed $160,000; Ampex, another equipment manufacturer, $85,000; and Valley National Bank was owed $30,000. Caldwell also ruled that the stockholders in SLTA were not eligible to receive a cent, saying KPAZ's bankruptcy had actually begun on May 31, 1969, before the bankruptcy filing in August. Glad Tidings had bought the station after the existing stations in town refused to give the church time on their air, raising funds through the sale of bonds.

Glad Tidings, even though it did not yet have the license, immediately took an active hand in operating KPAZ, raising potential concerns about undue influence. Less than a month after the approval in bankruptcy court, general manager Lou Silverstein resigned after a year at channel 21, citing indications he had received from bankruptcy trustee Altschul that Glad Tidings "wanted a manager who would work more closely with the church". He was replaced by ex-KPHO general manager Gene Spry. The changes did not take long to follow, as channel 21 began adding religious programming on the weekends. By April 1971, even though the license had still not transferred to Glad Tidings, the station was signing off nightly with an image of Jesus Christ. It would not be until June that the FCC approved the transfer of the KPAZ-TV license, at which time Glad Tidings announced it had bought new color videotape equipment.

To continue to fund channel 21's operation, Glad Tidings broadcast periodic pledge drives. In October, the station staged an 11-day telethon titled Outreach '72. That same month, Gene Spry resigned as general manager and was replaced by the Rev. V. O. Brassfield, the church's assistant pastor.

KPAZ also continued to originate new local programming through the bankruptcy process. Children's show Mr. Adam's Animals featured trained chimpanzees. In 1971, station manager Keith Houser created Action Auction. The live Saturday night program, allowed viewers to bid for products such as furniture, Native American jewelry, and automobile supplies. However, the show was canceled after Spry resigned.

Despite FCC approval, the sale to Glad Tidings met with continued opposition from KPAZ's largest creditor: RCA. The company filed at the United States Court of Appeals for the Ninth Circuit to appeal the KPAZ reorganization plan, warning that the original applications filed by Glad Tidings were so inadequate that they forced the church to retain a communications lawyer. On the line was all of RCA's equipment in use at channel 21. The appeals court found in favor of RCA in March 1972, ruling that, under state law, the equipment it had sold still belonged to RCA and could be repossessed at any time. However, bankruptcy referee Caldwell allowed KPAZ to reach a separate deal with RCA as to its equipment, allowing it to continue to operate. The decision reduced the effective purchase price to $155,000. Filings in the case revealed that bankruptcy trustee Altschul had not been allowed to see KPAZ's financial records. At the same time, Maricopa County won a ruling ordering KPAZ to pay it $16,000 in back property taxes for 1970 and 1971.

Glad Tidings continued to invest in KPAZ. On May 5, 1974, ground was broken for a new, 26,000-square-foot (2,400 m^{2}) two-story studio facility at the corner of North 36th Street and East McDowell Road in the Camelback East Village section of Phoenix. The facility, designed by architect James R. Abney, cost $1 million and opened in June 1975. The February 1975 Nielsen ratings showed KPAZ pulled more female viewers aged 25–40 for its broadcasts of The Real McCoys than those watching the CBS Evening News. Additionally, channel 21 aired a package of Phoenix Giants minor league baseball games in the 1975 season.

=== Financial collapse and sale ===
KPAZ-TV continued to lose money, with debts approaching $2 million, and as early as December 1975, potential suitors appeared. Trinity Broadcasting of Arizona, a subsidiary of a fledgling broadcast ministry known as the Trinity Broadcasting Network, filed to buy KPAZ from debt-ridden Glad Tidings, with plans to convert the station to entirely religious programming. Immediately, Trinity began buying air time on KPAZ at a rate of $10,000 a month, giving the station a vital lifeline. However, the deal collapsed on July 26 when Glad Tidings Church informed the FCC by telegram that it was terminating the deal, just one day before the commission was to take up the proposed sale. TBN founder Paul Crouch said that the church had apparently pulled out because TBN's purchase of airtime on KPAZ had ameliorated its financial situation to the point where the church sought to renegotiate the sale.

On January 19, 1977, RCA seized KPAZ's equipment for outstanding debts, forcing channel 21 to go dark. General manager Dale Allen Richman noted that the company "simply came in and took what was rightfully theirs". The next week, Euel and Cinderalla Ballentine, a couple who had bought $25,000 in Glad Tidings savings certificates promoted on the station, sued the church and 11 of its officers and directors, saying that they failed to disclose that Glad Tidings could not pay the interest on the certificates. General manager Richman defended channel 21, claiming that "the devil is trying to strike down the Christian ministry of this television station".

With KPAZ off the air, Trinity, still pursuing options to buy the station, was joined by the PTL Satellite Network, which began negotiating to buy KPAZ from Glad Tidings. At the time, PTL owned no television stations of its own. However, in March, TBN made another push to buy the station, asking KPAZ's bondholders to swap their Glad Tidings bonds for those of Trinity Broadcasting of Arizona. The Trinity acquisition was approved by the FCC on July 21, with the station returning to the air on Labor Day as its second station, after flagship KTBN-TV in Santa Ana, California. TBN also settled the lawsuit brought by the Ballentines for $27,500.

=== KPAZ under TBN ===
In 1979, TBN proposed adding a horizontal cross piece to KPAZ's South Mountain tower, which would have been lit to create a lighted cross; this was denied by the City of Phoenix parks department, which said that the towers on the mountain were already a "necessary evil" and that religious symbols did not belong on public property.

After the 2019 abolition of the FCC's "Main Studio Rule", requiring full-service television stations to maintain facilities in or near their communities of license, TBN closed 27 studio facilities including KPAZ-TV's studios on East McDowell Road, which the station had occupied since 1975.

== Technical information ==
=== Subchannels ===
The station's signal is multiplexed:

Subchannels of KPAZ-TV
Subchannel	Res.	Short name	Programming
21.1	720p	TBN HD	TBN
21.2	720p	TVDEALS	Infomercials
21.3	480i	Inspire	TBN Inspire
21.4	480i	ONTV4U	OnTV4U (infomercials) (4:3)
21.5	480i	POSITIV	Positiv

TBN-owned full-power stations permanently ceased analog transmissions on April 16, 2009.

=== Analog-to-digital transition ===
The station received UHF channel 20 as its digital television allocation in April 1997 and was granted a permit to begin constructing digital facilities in August 2001. Special temporary authority granted in October 2002 allowed the digital signal to sign on the air at a lower power level. KPAZ elected channel 20 for its post-transition facilities, allowing the station to build its final facilities right away, but construction was delayed due to a steep rise in local construction that left the Phoenix area with a shortage of workers to install the antenna. In March 2007, the station began program testing, and in February 2008, it certified that it was operating its full-power post-transition facilities.
