= KPNX =

Television station in Mesa, Arizona

- Mesa–Phoenix, Arizona; United States
- City: Mesa, Arizona
- Channels: Digital: 18 (UHF); Virtual: 12
- Branding: KPNX 12; 12News

Programming
- Affiliations: 12.1: NBC; for others, see § Subchannels

Ownership
- Owner: Tegna Inc., a subsidiary of Nexstar Media Group; (Multimedia Holdings Corporation)
- Sister stations: Nexstar: KAZT-TV

History
- First air date: May 2, 1953
- Former call signs: KTYL-TV (1953–1954); KVAR (1955–1961); KTAR-TV (1961–1979)
- Former channel numbers: Analog: 12 (VHF, 1953–2009); Digital: 36 (UHF, 2000–2009), 12 (VHF, 2009–2021)
- Former affiliations: DuMont (secondary, 1953–1956)
- Call sign meaning: "Phoenix"

Technical information
- Licensing authority: FCC
- Facility ID: 35486
- ERP: 1,000 kW
- HAAT: 535.1 m (1,756 ft)
- Transmitter coordinates: 33°20′0″N 112°3′51″W
- Translator(s): KNAZ-TV 2 (22 UHF) Flagstaff; for others, see § Translators

Links
- Public license information: Public file; LMS
- Website: www.12news.com

KPNX (channel 12) is a television station licensed to Mesa, Arizona, United States, serving the Phoenix area as an affiliate of NBC. It is owned by the Tegna subsidiary of Nexstar Media Group and operated alongside CW station KAZT-TV (channel 7). KPNX maintains studios at the Republic Media building on Van Buren Street in downtown Phoenix; its transmitter is located atop South Mountain on the city's south side. It is rebroadcast by KNAZ-TV (channel 2) in Flagstaff, a full-power satellite station, and translators across northern and central Arizona.

Channel 12 began broadcasting on May 2, 1953, as KTYL-TV, the Valley's second television station and a counterpart to radio station KTYL, a venture of Harkins Theatres and Harry Nace. Originally operating from studios in Mesa, it was the NBC affiliate in the Phoenix area from its sign-on and the first local TV station to locate its transmitter on South Mountain. At the time it went on air, Phoenix radio station KTAR, which had long been associated with NBC, was deadlocked in a battle for channel 3 with a group including former U.S. senator Ernest McFarland. In February 1954, KTAR exited this battle by buying KTYL-TV. KTAR already had television studios planned near downtown Phoenix, to which channel 12 relocated. The station became KVAR and then KTAR-TV in 1961. The KTAR stations and Eller Outdoor Advertising merged into Phoenix-based Combined Communications in 1968.

Combined merged into the Gannett Company in 1979. The transaction required KTAR radio to be split from the TV station, resulting in channel 12 changing its call sign to KPNX. Through much of this time, KPNX was the Phoenix area's second-rated TV news station. In 1994, KPNX was the only major TV station in Phoenix not affected by a major realignment of network affiliations and emerged as the news ratings and revenue leader in Phoenix, a title it would hold for the next decade. Gannett acquired The Arizona Republic in 2000, and in 2011 KPNX moved into the same building as the newspaper. They were split up by the 2015 split of Gannett into a newspaper company and a broadcasting company, the latter of which was known as Tegna Inc. Nexstar, operator of KAZT-TV, acquired Tegna in 2026.

== History ==
=== Early years ===
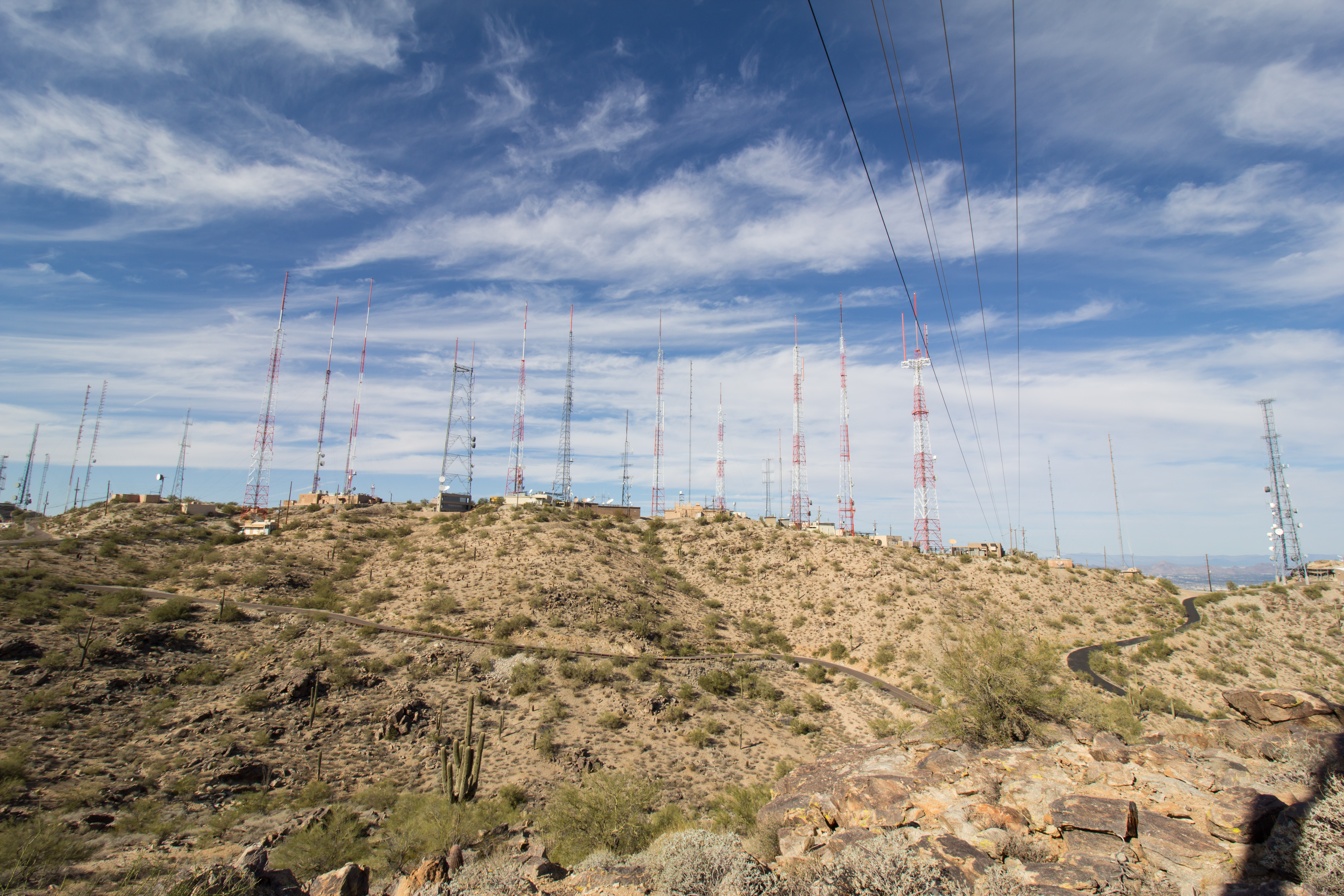
KTYL-TV was the first Phoenix-area TV station to broadcast from South Mountain

On November 1, 1952, Harkins Broadcasting, Inc. filed an application to build a new television station on channel 12 in Mesa, Arizona. Harkins Broadcasting was a joint venture of two movie theater operators, Harkins Theatres and Harry Nace, and owned Mesa radio stations KTYL (1310 AM) and KTYL-FM 104.7. The Federal Communications Commission (FCC) granted the construction permit on February 18, 1953. At the end of March 1953, the city of Phoenix's parks board approved a South Mountain transmitter, reversing an earlier decision that would have denied television stations not licensed to Phoenix the use of the site and which was protested by television set owners who wanted to be assured reception of all stations from one site.

With the site approved by the FCC and the city of Phoenix, construction began nearly immediately. Much of the studio equipment, installed at an expansion to the KTYL facilities on Main Street in Mesa, was already on hand. The station began broadcasting on May 2, with its introductory program being a 19-hour telethon to benefit United Cerebral Palsy. An NBC affiliate from the outset, the station briefly maintained a Phoenix office which closed just two months after launch.

Lurking under the embryonic Phoenix television landscape was the absence of one of the state's pioneer radio stations. In 1948, KTAR (620 AM) had filed for Phoenix's channel 3, only to see the FCC plunge television applications into a four-year-long freeze. As early as 1945, KTAR had arranged for exclusive rights to the South Mountain space that would later be used by all of the Phoenix TV stations as a transmitter site—a concession that was overturned in the run-up to KTYL-TV's launch. When the freeze was lifted in 1952, KTAR declared it would be on the air within three months of a construction permit grant, having already selected a site for and broken ground on a proposed television and radio studio at Central Avenue and Portland Street and contracted for equipment to furnish it. It was speculated that KPHO-TV owner Meredith Corporation—whose station was the only pre-freeze outlet in the state—might have decided to let KTYL-TV have NBC because of the sense that, as soon as KTAR won a television station, it would sign up with NBC, mirroring the radio station.

However, KTAR's channel 3 picture became cloudy in February 1953, just as the FCC was about to hand down a decision. A new applicant, the Arizona Television Company, filed for the channel. This applicant added a major power broker to its ranks months later: Ernest McFarland, former senator and soon to be governor. In February 1954, hearings were held on the channel 3 assignment.

The channel 3 contest ended in April 1954, when KTAR announced it would buy KTYL-TV for $250,000, a decision that cleared the way for the Arizona Television Company to build KTVK. In announcing the purchase, KTAR owner John J. Louis explained that he wanted to give KTAR a television sister without going through hearings.

When the sale closed in July 1954, KTYL-TV became KVAR; immediately, KTAR-purchased equipment was added to the studios, which were then moved to Phoenix in 1956 over KTVK's objection; the station was also allowed to identify as "Phoenix/Mesa" in 1958. In 1960, a new tower and maximum-power transmitter were commissioned; the prior facility was then sold to Arizona State University and used to launch educational station KAET on channel 8 in 1961. In April 1961, the call sign was changed to KTAR-TV, which had not been previously available to the television station because it was licensed to a different location from the radio station.

=== Growth ===
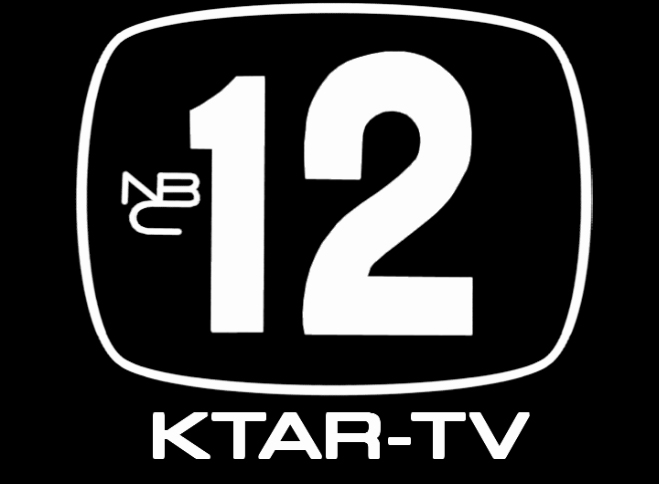
KTAR-TV logo used from 1970 to 1973.

In 1968, the Louis family's KTAR and Eller Outdoor Advertising, owned by Karl Eller, merged into Combined Communications Corporation. Combined then grew into owning other television and radio stations and owned a full complement of seven by 1974, when it merged with Pacific & Southern Broadcasting Company.

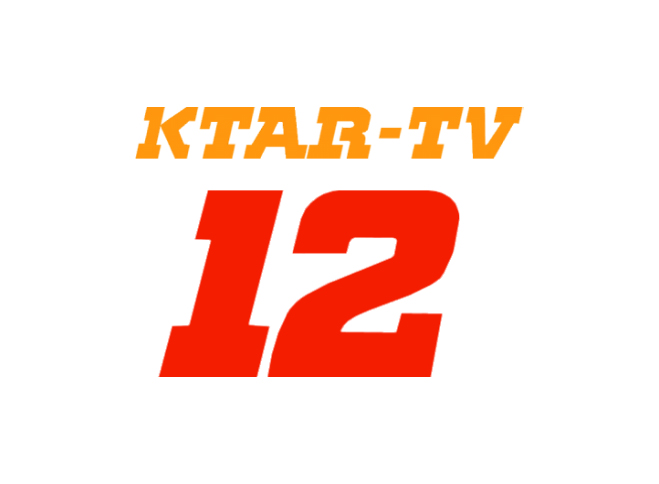
KTAR-TV logo from 1973; it was based on the font used by NBC News at the time.

In 1978, Combined Communications agreed to merge with the Gannett Company. The merged company opted to retain channel 12 and divest the Phoenix radio stations; Combined's ownership of the KTAR stations had been grandfathered earlier in the decade when the FCC forbade common ownership of television and radio stations in top-50 markets, but with the Gannett merger, the KTAR cluster lost its grandfathered protection. The radio stations were traded to Pulitzer Broadcasting in 1979 for KSD radio in St. Louis and $2 million. KTAR-TV then changed its call sign to KPNX on June 4, 1979, since the radio properties had held the KTAR call letters first. (Note: At the time, broadcast stations with different owners could not share the same call letters.)

From 1977 to 1995, channel 12 was run by general manager C.E. "Pep" Cooney, who also did on-air editorials; he then became a senior vice president of Gannett for several years prior to his retirement in 1998. In 1985, it was the first Phoenix TV station to broadcast in stereo.

The fact that KPNX was the only Phoenix station unaffected by a major realignment of network affiliations in 1994 and 1995 fueled a run of success for KPNX and its news department that lasted more than a decade. In 2005, the station had the highest revenue of any in Phoenix: $75 million, representing almost 20 percent of the market.

=== Newspaper co-ownership ===
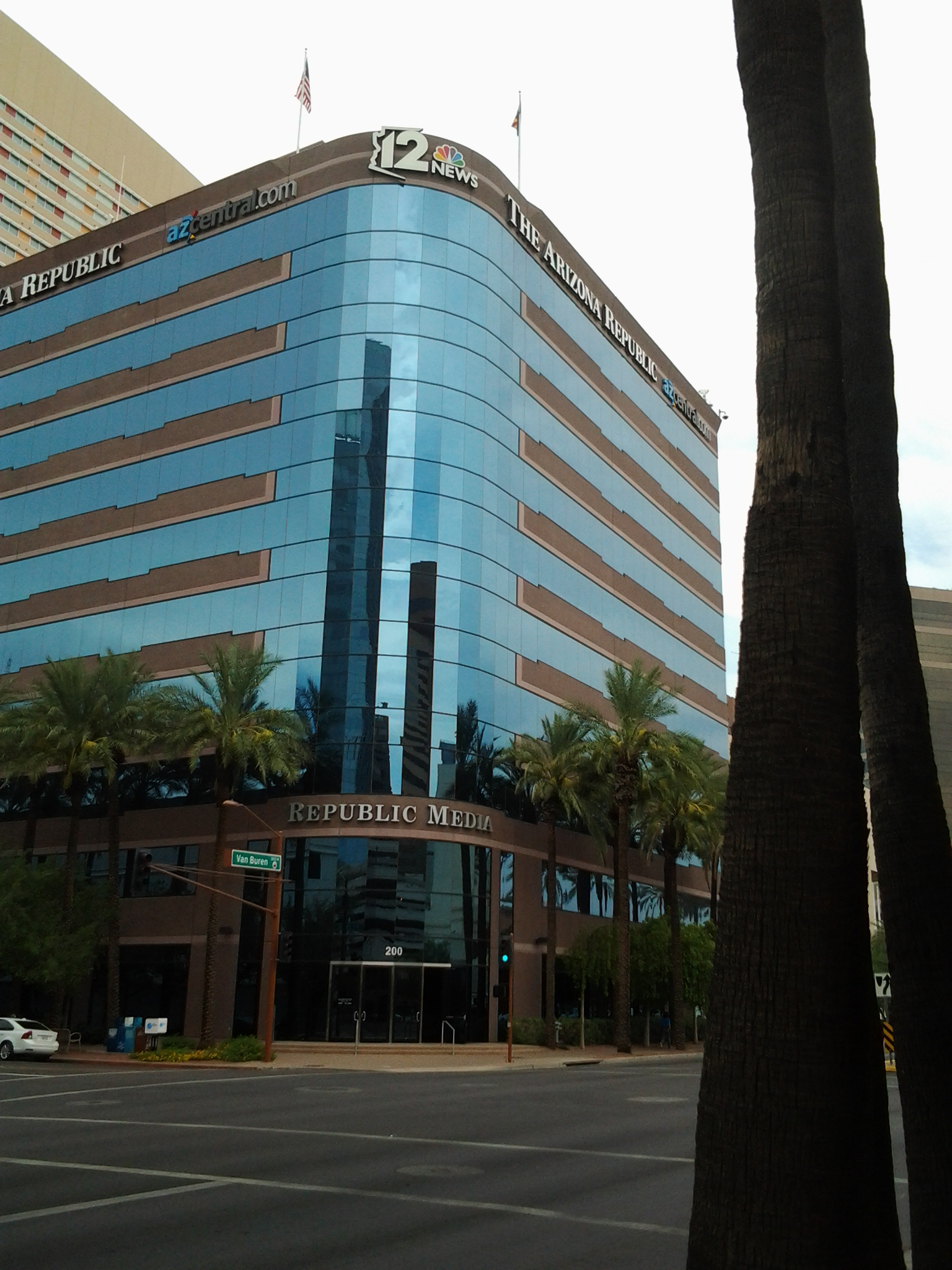
Southwest corner of the Republic Media Building in 2013

In 2000, Gannett merged with Central Newspapers, owner of The Arizona Republic, in the second-largest newspaper deal ever at the time. While the FCC barred the common ownership of newspapers and television stations in the same market, Gannett successfully banked on a potential rule change; even as written at the time before being relaxed in 2003, the issue would not have been pressed until KPNX's license came up for renewal in 2006. With Gannett owning the then-number-one station in Phoenix and the state's largest newspaper, the two merged their websites in 2001.

In January 2011, KPNX left its longtime home on Central Avenue and consolidated its operations with The Republic at the Republic Media Building on East Van Buren Street in downtown Phoenix, with the station's local newscasts broadcasting from a streetside studio. The Central Avenue facility was then significantly renovated and became the Parsons Center for Health and Wellness, the headquarters complex for the Southwest Center for HIV/AIDS.

On June 29, 2015, the Gannett Company split in two, with one side specializing in print media and the other side specializing in broadcast and digital media. KPNX was retained by the broadcasting company, which took the name Tegna. As a consequence of the split, KPNX regained a separate website, having shared azcentral.com with the newspaper. KPNX and The Republic operated in the same building as separate entities until November 2025, when the latter moved to midtown Phoenix.

=== Nexstar ownership ===
Nexstar Media Group acquired Tegna in a deal announced in August 2025 and completed on March 19, 2026. Integration of Tegna into Nexstar, who already operated KAZT-TV in the market, was halted one week after the merger's close by a temporary restraining order issued by the U.S. District Court for the Eastern District of California, later escalated to a preliminary injunction.

== Local programming ==
=== Newscasts ===
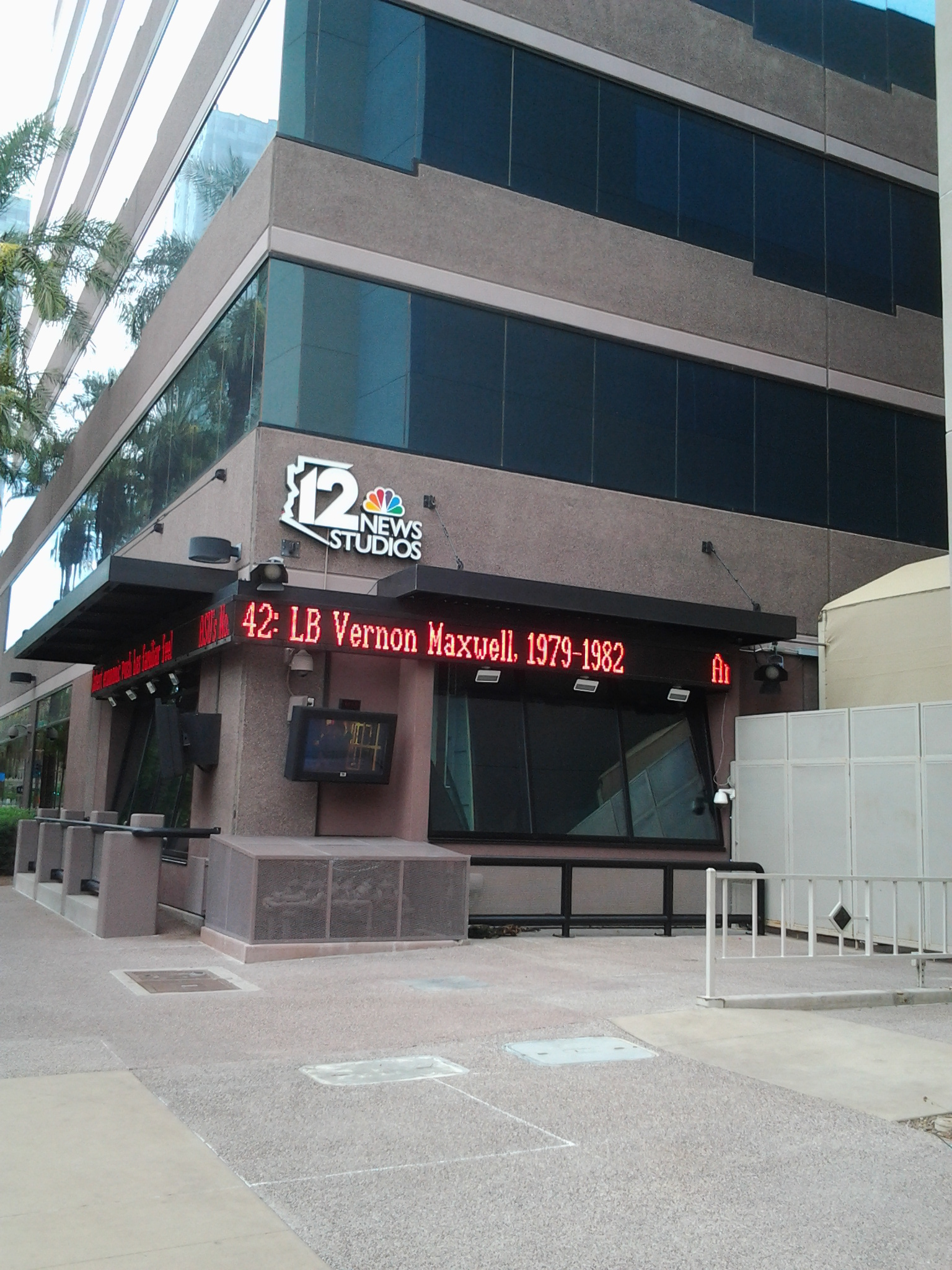
The KPNX streetside studio in 2013

KTAR-TV was the Phoenix pioneer of the so-called "happy talk" news format when it reformatted its newscasts under the Action News format in late 1973, with longtime anchor Ray Thompson paired alongside Bob Hughes, weatherman Dewey Hopper, and sportscaster Ted Brown. By 1980, the station had moved into a solid second-place position behind KOOL-TV. The Action News moniker was dropped in 1986. KTVK's rise in the late 1980s and early 1990s led to a more competitive environment.

In 1994, KPNX was the only station unaffected by a major realignment of network affiliations in the Phoenix market. This status and the strength of NBC in the late 1990s helped to catalyze a decade of ratings success for channel 12, which put together nearly 50 consecutive ratings book wins at 10 p.m. from 1996 to 2007, even while NBC's ratings faltered toward the end of the run. It was the first station in the state to convert its news production to high definition in 2006.

Channel 12 began using a helicopter in 1978; it was the market's second, and it was piloted by Jerry Foster, who was hired from KOOL-TV. "Sky 12" was frequently called upon for search and rescue missions, and Foster received a Harmon Trophy in 1981. He left KPNX in 1988 and later worked at KTVK, his career ending when he was indicted on methamphetamine charges in 1996. On March 1, 2009, KPNX began to share a news helicopter operated by Helicopters Inc., as part of an agreement with KPHO-TV and KTVK to consolidate news helicopter operations following a mid-air collision between KTVK and KNXV-TV's helicopters; the helicopter was named "News Chopper 20", as a combination of the channel numbers of the three stations (3, 5 and 12). All four Phoenix television newsrooms share one helicopter as of 2021.

On August 15, 2026, KPNX began producing 12News on CW7 Arizona to air at 9 p.m. on KAZT.

=== Sports programming ===
Karl Eller, who owned the company that became Combined Communications, was also one of the original founding owners of the city's first major professional sports team, the NBA's Phoenix Suns. Channel 12 carried Suns games from the team's 1968 inception until 1973; KPHO-TV aired the Suns for six seasons until they returned to KPNX from 1979 to 1985, when the game telecasts moved to then-independent station KNXV-TV.

In 2017, KPNX acquired the rights to preseason games of the Arizona Cardinals and also began airing team-oriented programming, rights which moved to KPHO-TV in 2024. In 2025, KPNX simulcast 10 regular-season Arizona Diamondbacks games, all on Friday nights. The partnership was renewed for 2026, with 10 games including the home opener.

=== Former on-air staff ===
- Pat Finn – weathercaster and host of Finn & Friends, 1983–1985
- Jineane Ford – anchor, 1991–2007
- Kari Lake – anchor, 1994–1998
- Mike Hambrick – anchor, 1978–1979
- Sean McLaughlin – chief meteorologist, 1992–2004
- Fred Roggin – sports anchor, 1979–1980
- Ric Romero – investigative reporter, 1980s
- Mary Kim Titla – reporter, 1993–2005
- Rick DeBruhl – reporter, 1978–2009

== Technical information ==
=== Subchannels ===
KPNX broadcasts from South Mountain. Its signal is multiplexed:

Subchannels of KPNX
Subchannel	Res.	Short name	Programming
12.1	1080i	KPNX-HD	NBC
12.2	480i	ShopLC	Shop LC
12.3	480i	Crime	True Crime Network
12.4	480i	Quest	Quest
12.5	480i	NEST	The Nest
61.2	480i	Grit	Grit (KASW)

Broadcast on behalf of another station

On July 8, 2021—the same date that KPNX moved to UHF—the station's ATSC 3.0 signal also moved from the low-power KFPH-CD multiplex to KASW. As part of a simultaneous rebalancing of KASW's subchannels, KASW's subchannel of Grit was moved to the KPNX multiplex.

=== Analog-to-digital conversion ===
In 1997, the FCC allocated UHF channel 36 as KPNX's companion digital channel, construction on the digital transmitter began the following year. KPNX signed on its digital signal in June 2000. KPNX shut down its analog signal, over VHF channel 12, at 10:12 p.m. (during the station's 10 p.m. newscast) on June 12, 2009, the official date on which full-power television stations in the United States transitioned from analog to digital broadcasts under federal mandate. At 10:38 p.m. on that date, the station's digital signal relocated from its pre-transition UHF channel 36 to VHF channel 12.

In 2021, the FCC approved KPNX's move from VHF channel 12 to UHF channel 18, which went into effect on July 8.

=== Translators ===
KPNX's signal is additionally rebroadcast over the following translators:

- Bullhead City: K08PK-D
- Camp Verde: K25MK-D
- Chloride: K25PJ-D
- Dolan Springs: K35EI-D
- Globe: K26OD-D
- Golden Valley: K21EG-D
- Kingman: K35MX-D
- Lake Havasu City: K28PO-D
- Meadview: K23DK-D
- Payson: K22PG-D
- Peach Springs: K26GF-D
- Prescott: K06AE-D
