= KIHP =

KIHP may refer to:

- KIHP (AM), a radio station (1310 AM) licensed to serve Mesa, Arizona, United States
- KIHP-LP, a defunct low-power radio station (96.5 FM) formerly licensed to serve Shasta Lake, California, United States
