= KXAM =

KXAM may refer to:

- KXAM (FM), a radio station (102.5 FM) licensed to serve San Diego, Texas, United States
- KIHP (AM), a radio station (1310 AM) licensed to serve Mesa, Arizona, United States, which used the call sign KXAM from 1990 to 2009
- KBVO (TV), a television station (channel 14) licensed to serve Llano, Texas, which used the call sign KXAM-TV from 1991 to 2009
