= KNAZ-TV =

Television station in Flagstaff, Arizona

Satellite of KPNX, Mesa–Phoenix, Arizona
- Flagstaff, Arizona; United States
- Channels: Digital: 22 (UHF); Virtual: 2
- Branding: 12News

Programming
- Affiliations: NBC

Ownership
- Owner: Tegna Inc., a subsidiary of Nexstar Media Group; (Multimedia Holdings Corporation)
- Sister stations: KPNX; Nexstar: KAZT-TV

History
- First air date: May 2, 1970
- Former call signs: KOAI (1970–1981)
- Former channel numbers: Analog: 2 (VHF, 1970–2009)
- Call sign meaning: Northern Arizona

Technical information
- Licensing authority: FCC
- Facility ID: 24749
- ERP: 283 kW
- HAAT: 465 m (1,526 ft)
- Transmitter coordinates: 34°58′6″N 111°30′31″W

Links
- Public license information: Public file; LMS
- Website: www.12news.com

KNAZ-TV (channel 2) is a television station licensed to Flagstaff, Arizona, United States, affiliated with NBC. Owned by the Tegna subsidiary of Nexstar Media Group, the station maintains a news bureau on the campus of Northern Arizona University in Flagstaff, and its transmitter is located southeast of Flagstaff on Mormon Mountain.

KNAZ-TV operates as a full-time satellite of Phoenix-based KPNX (channel 12), whose studios are located at the Republic Media building on Van Buren Street in downtown Phoenix. KNAZ covers areas of northern Arizona that receive a marginal to non-existent over-the-air signal from KPNX. KNAZ is a straight simulcast of KPNX; on-air references to KNAZ are limited to Federal Communications Commission (FCC)-mandated hourly station identifications during newscasts and other programming. KNAZ is also operated alongside KAZT-TV (channel 7).

KNAZ is the only full-power television station in northern Arizona broadcasting one of the major English-language television networks. It was established as a full originating station in 1970 and continued to produce local newscasts until 2008. After a succession of owners, it came into common ownership with KPNX in 1997.

== History ==
=== KOAI ===
As early as July 1967, plans were beginning to crystallize for the construction of a new television station in Flagstaff, Arizona, the area's first high-power station; the area was only served by two UHF translators of KTVK and KOOL-TV from Phoenix. The primary promoter of the proposed station was Wendell Elliott Sr., who had managed radio station KGNO in Dodge City, Kansas, and had founded associated television station KTVC in nearby Ensign in the 1950s; he also was a founder of the Kansas Association of Broadcasters in 1951. Other stockholders included former Flagstaff mayor Charles L. Saunders, who owned radio station KCLS and had once sought to build a Flagstaff TV station himself. Elliott originally sought to build a 200-foot (61 m) tower atop Mount Elden and downtown studios, raising $85,000 by selling stock in the venture.

Flagstaff had originally been assigned channels 9 and 13 for television use. However, when the Elliott group—incorporated in 1968 as Grand Canyon Television Company—was forced by the United States Forest Service to switch proposed transmitter sites from Mount Elden to Mormon Mountain, southeast of Flagstaff, it asked the Federal Communications Commission (FCC) to change out channel 9 for channel 2 in order to avoid potential spacing problems to Tucson's channel 9 station, KGUN-TV. From the start, Grand Canyon planned to obtain NBC affiliation for its station.

Grand Canyon officially filed an application for construction permit on March 26, 1969, the FCC having approved the change to channel 2 earlier in the month, and the commission granted the application on September 10. With the permit approved, construction commenced nearly immediately; in January 1970, power lines were buried under Mormon Mountain to provide electrical service to the summit. The transmitter facility was complete by early April, when the first test patterns went out, and KOAI began broadcasting on May 2, 1970. It was some time before the station began producing local programming, as the studios at 528 W. Aspen were not yet completed.

KOAI was among the first stations seen on much of the Navajo Nation when a tribe-owned translator was completed atop Navajo Mountain in 1973. At the time, the station produced and aired a daily Navajo-language news program hosted by Chester Yazzie; the program was aired the next day on KIVA-TV in Farmington, New Mexico, and later also on KOAT-TV in Albuquerque. It was the only Navajo-language television program in the world at the time.

Wendell Elliott Sr. died in 1974 of an apparent heart attack. His son, Wendell Elliott Jr., took over the operation of the business, which was claimed to be the fourth-smallest TV station in the United States.

=== KNAZ-TV ===
In 1980, the Grand Canyon Television Company approved the sale of KOAI to Capitol Broadcasting Company of Jackson, Mississippi, (Note: Not related to the Capitol Broadcasting Company of Raleigh, North Carolina.) which owned radio and television stations in the Mississippi city and KKTV in Colorado Springs, Colorado. Capitol closed on the sale in February 1981 and immediately sought to improve all aspects of the operation. On March 23, 1981, the call sign was changed to KNAZ-TV to represent the station's service area. (Kevin McCabe, a longtime Phoenix sports journalist who worked for channel 2 at the time, noted that people had "laughed" at KOAI for the preceding decade and that the station had set a "bad precedent".) A new maximum-power transmitter at 100,000 watts was installed; the news department was expanded; and Capitol also moved the station into a new building on Vickey Street in 1982. With the upgraded building came much-needed technical updates, notably a conversion to electronic news gathering on videotape from film.

While Capitol Broadcasting, owned by the Hederman family as well as Standard Life Insurance, put all of its properties up for sale in late 1982, they continued to own the station for nearly six more years. During that time, Grand Canyon Television built KMOH-TV, a satellite station of KNAZ at Kingman that began broadcasting on February 29, 1988. It was not until July of that year that KNAZ-TV found a buyer, Peter J. Klein of Indiana; Klein beat out Sunbelt Communications Company of Las Vegas for the station.

Klein's ownership of the television station would end with his ouster in 1991 after four investors who owned 72.5 percent of the business petitioned a court to place Grand Canyon Television into receivership. There had been signs of possible financial trouble earlier in the year when KNAZ-TV was listed as delinquent on its county property taxes; radio station KAFF reported the station was behind on payroll, charges that its financial manager denied. The investors also claimed that Klein, an Indianapolis resident, was an absentee owner and that the firm had lost $3.8 million. The stations emerged from receivership after a year, with W. A. Franke, one of the investors who filed the original motion, as the leader of the business. By this time, KNAZ-TV was airing daily 5, 6, and 10 p.m. newscasts that beat the Phoenix stations within the Flagstaff area.

=== Gannett/Tegna ownership ===
Final 2 News logo, used until the end of local newscasts on August 15, 2008

In January 1997, Grand Canyon announced that it had sold KNAZ-TV and KMOH, by that point disconnected from the Flagstaff station, to the Gannett Company, which owned KPNX in Phoenix. The purchase, which closed in May 1997, attracted attention and concern over the fate of KNAZ-TV; rumors swirled that Gannett would discontinue local newscasts for Northern Arizona and run the station as a full-time rebroadcaster of KPNX. It was noted that the KPNX purchase of KNAZ-TV had taken place after the Flagstaff cable system attempted to drop KPNX from its lineup but found itself unable to do so because Gannett threatened to discontinue carriage on co-owned systems in Sedona, Kingman, Lake Havasu City, and Bullhead City.

In December 2005, Gannett announced its intention to sell KNAZ-TV. While Gannett waited for a buyer to surface, the station ceased producing weekend newscasts in 2006, airing newscasts from KPNX with Flagstaff-specific weather inserts. KNAZ ceased production of local newscasts and became a full satellite of KPNX on August 15, 2008, citing inadequate advertising revenues and a lack of satellite carriage as factors in the decision. A Flagstaff bureau was established to cover Northern Arizona news, and some of the station's staff were kept to staff it. Some of the void was filled when Northern Arizona University began producing a local newscast, NAZ Today, for cable and streaming in 2008.

Nexstar Media Group acquired station owner Tegna Inc. in a deal announced in August 2025 and completed on March 19, 2026.

== Notable former on-air staff ==
- Emme Aronson – reporter/morning anchor; known as Melissa Julian at KNAZ
- Steve Bunin – sports director/anchor, 1997–2000
- Dina Eastwood – anchor/reporter

== Technical information ==
KNAZ-TV broadcasts from Mormon Mountain. Its signal is multiplexed:

Subchannel of KNAZ-TV
Subchannel	Res.	Short name	Programming
2.1	1080i	KPNX-HD	NBC
2.2	480i	ShopLC	Shop LC
2.3	480i	Crime	True Crime Network
2.4	480i	Quest	Quest
2.5	480i	NEST	The Nest
2.2 (Note: This is KASW 61.2, broadcast on its behalf by KPNX but missing its correct major channel number.)	480i	Grit	Grit

In its DTV allotment plan of April 3, 1997, the FCC assigned channel 22 for KNAZ-DT, and on February 22, 2001, it granted to Gannett a construction permit to build the digital facilities. The digital facility did not begin full-power broadcasts until January 2007.

KNAZ had originally intended to move its digital broadcasts to VHF channel 2 after the digital transition. This plan was abandoned as the existing channel 2 antenna had sustained damage in three successive ice storms; an April 2008 inspection found arcing and repeated automatic shutdown due to signal power being reflected back into the transmitter that left it incapable of full-power operation, as well as an eight-inch (20 cm) crack in the antenna mast that would have required welding to repair. The channel 2 antenna failed completely on April 16, 2009, forcing KNAZ's analog signal to go dark permanently. KNAZ-TV was therefore forced to request that the FCC allow it to continue broadcasting in digital on channel 22, a change the FCC approved of on September 15, 2009.
