= The Wallace and Ladmo Show =

American children's television program

- Created by: Bill Thompson
- Starring: Bill Thompson; Ladimir Kwiatkowski; Pat McMahon
- Country of origin: United States

Production
- Running time: 60 minutes / 30 minutes

Original release
- Network: KPHO-TV
- Release: April 1, 1954 – December 29, 1989

The Wallace and Ladmo Show, also known as It's Wallace and Wallace & Company, is a children's television show produced by and aired on KPHO-TV (Channel 5) in Phoenix, Arizona, from April 1, 1954, to December 29, 1989. For most of its 35-year run, it was broadcast in the afternoon, Monday through Friday, and usually live.

== History ==
The Wallace and Ladmo Show ran more than 35 years—making it one of the longest-running, daily, locally produced children's television shows in American broadcasting.

It premiered as It's Wallace?, a vehicle to showcase cartoons for KPHO in January 1954. The show was hosted by Bill Thompson, who created the character of Wallace Snead when he appeared on the Golddust Charlie Show (also on KPHO). It aired on Tuesday and Thursday evenings at 6:30 PM. Within a year, Ladimir Kwiatkowski (who had been a cameraman for the station) joined the show as Ladmo, the rubber-faced sidekick to Wallace. In 1960, Pat McMahon joined the cast and developed a list of characters (such as Gerald, Aunt Maud, Captain Super and Marshall Good) that parodied various popular culture icons. (McMahon remains a popular talk radio personality for KTAR in the Phoenix market.) In addition to the daily broadcasts, the cast of the show performed regular stage shows at such venues as local movie theaters and malls, Encanto Park (in central Phoenix), and the Legend City theme park.

In 1968 the show was renamed Wallace & Company and again in 1970, to its better known title, The Wallace & Ladmo Show. In 1973, the time slot of the show split with a morning and afternoon show but taping of the two shows was still in the afternoon so children could attend the audience after school.

The show ended with the final taping on December 29, 1989. By that time it had won many awards, including nine regional Emmy awards.

KAZT-TV (Channel 7.1 in Prescott and Phoenix) has periodically aired reruns of The Wallace and Ladmo Show. As of January 1, 2023, they have added these reruns to their Sunday schedule.

== Ladmo Bags ==
A Ladmo Bag

In the mid-1960s, the Ladmo Bag first appeared on the show. Prior to this, children who were winners of one of the many ongoing contests run by the program, were invited on the show to pick a prize from the "Toy Cottage". Often they would have a difficult time choosing which prize they wanted, leading to delays and slowing the pace of the show. Wallace credits Pat McMahon with coming up with the idea, of putting items from the show's sponsors in a bag, and giving that to the winner instead. The Ladmo Bag could also be won by children in the in-studio audience or at stage performances. They were paper grocery bags filled with candy, potato chips, cans of soda, assorted coupons and so on.

To Wallace and Ladmo fans and collectors, an authentic Ladmo Bag from the original show can be worth a considerable amount of money. However, very few of these bags still exist intact, as most children that won the prizes consumed the content inside and discarded the bag. Some natives of the Phoenix area use the expression "I never got a Ladmo Bag when I was a kid" as a metaphor for "I had a deprived childhood."

The last Ladmo bag, on the final telecast, was given to Wallace in a symbolic gesture by Ladmo. Although Kwiatkowski died on Wednesday March 2, 1994, select people attending events like the Arizona State Fair would still win Ladmo bags as recently as 2014. Bill Thompson (Wallace) died on July 23, 2014.

In 2015, Pat McMahon revealed that the seating chart, ostensibly used to determine the winner of the Ladmo Bag during the show, was actually a blank sheet of paper. According to McMahon, Wallace would simply choose a seat at random.

Inmates of the Maricopa County jail have been known to call the bags of food given to them as "Ladmo Bags".

== Plays ==
In recent years there have been two plays written about the show. The first play follows Wallace, Ladmo, Pat and Mike Condello as they struggle to hold the show together when the parody band, Hub Kapp and the Wheels, is offered a record deal with Capitol Records. The second play deals with the death of Ladmo from cancer. The first play was performed two times at the Herberger Theater Center in downtown Phoenix, with several celebrities showing up as "Time Machine" guests, including Alice Cooper. The plays were all written by Ben Tyler with input from both Thompson and McMahon.

== Museum exhibits ==
The Wallace and Ladmo Show has been the subject of several museum exhibits over the years. In 2009, two different exhibits about the show's history were on view: one at the Arizona Historical Society in Tempe (AHS has over 2,500 Wallace and Ladmo items in their collection), and the other at the Mesa Historical Museum. There is also a permanent exhibit in the Musical Instrument Museum in Phoenix.

== Legacy ==
In 1999, Bill Thompson planted a tree in honor of Ladmo at the Boyce Thompson Arboretum.

On April 1, 2015, the show's 61st anniversary, the creation of The Wallace and Ladmo Foundation was announced. The goal of the foundation is to support Arizona children in the performing arts.

On March 27, 2024, the city of Phoenix announced that it would rename a section of McKinley Street at First Avenue as Wallace and Ladmo Way.

Other tributes to the show include a mural of the cast which decorated the side of the First Studio building, Tempe's Boys and Girls Club was renamed the Ladmo Branch, Wallace and Ladmo Stage at the state fairgrounds, and Ladmo Park in Phoenix. Thompson, Kwaitkowski, and McMahon were all recognized at Arizona Historymakers in the Arizona Historical League’s inaugural group, recognizing their contribution to Arizona culture.
