= KUTP =

Television station in Phoenix, Arizona

- Phoenix, Arizona; United States
- Channels: Digital: 26 (UHF); Virtual: 45
- Branding: Fox 10 Plus

Programming
- Affiliations: 45.1: Independent with MyNetworkTV; 10.2: Fox; for others, see § Subchannels

Ownership
- Owner: Fox Television Stations, LLC
- Sister stations: KSAZ-TV

History
- Founded: December 20, 1984
- First air date: December 23, 1985
- Former channel number: Analog: 45 (UHF, 1985–2009)
- Former affiliations: Independent (1985–1995); UPN (1995–2006)
- Call sign meaning: United Television Phoenix, referring to the founding owner

Technical information
- Licensing authority: FCC
- Facility ID: 68886
- ERP: 1,000 kW
- HAAT: 531.5 m (1,744 ft)
- Transmitter coordinates: 33°20′3.3″N 112°3′43.2″W
- Translator(s): see § Translators

Links
- Public license information: Public file; LMS
- Website: www.fox10phoenix.com/fox10xtra

KUTP (channel 45), branded as Fox 10 Plus, is a television station in Phoenix, Arizona, United States. It is programmed primarily as an independent station, but maintains a secondary affiliation with MyNetworkTV. KUTP is owned by Fox Television Stations alongside KSAZ-TV (channel 10) and the two stations share studios on West Adams Street in Downtown Phoenix; KUTP's transmitter is located atop South Mountain.

== History ==
=== Early years ===
In May 1984, the Federal Communications Commission (FCC) allocated channel 45 to Phoenix and began taking applications for the channel after United Television, a subsidiary of Chris-Craft Industries, petitioned for the additional slot. United soon got competition for the channel from another twelve applicants. Undeterred, United bought out all of the competitors for a reported $5 million and won a construction permit on December 20, 1984.

United immediately set out to bring Phoenix its third independent station alongside the existing KPHO-TV and KNXV. It originally proposed to become KOLT-TV (as in "Kolt 45"), but United could not convince radio station KOLT in Scottsbluff, Nebraska, to give it the rights to share the designation. On December 23, 1985, a year after obtaining the construction permit, KUTP came to air as the only station United would build and sign on from the ground-up in the company's history. Along with movies and syndicated programs, United commissioned a revival of The Lloyd Thaxton Show, last seen in Los Angeles in the late 1960s, as a centerpiece of its programming efforts. In 1988, United made an even more consequential pickup when it signed a deal to telecast away games of the Phoenix Suns. The initial deal saw the station receive the rights to 25 road games for five years, with the figure increasing to 30 beginning in the 1990–91 season and to 41 games by the mid-1990s, when the Suns were the station's chief viewership draw.

Under United Television ownership, the station carried programming from the Prime Time Entertainment Network programming service from January 1993 to January 1995. In the fall of 1994, United Television and Paramount Pictures announced the formation of the United Paramount Network (UPN), lining up independent stations that were owned by both companies at the time as charter affiliates; KUTP affiliated with UPN upon the network's January 16, 1995, debut.

In 2000, Paramount parent company Viacom bought Chris-Craft's 50% ownership interest in UPN (which Chris-Craft had wholly owned, until Viacom acquired a stake in the network in 1996). On August 12 of that year, Chris-Craft sold its UPN stations to the Fox Television Stations subsidiary of News Corporation for $5.5 billion; this resulted in the creation of Phoenix's second television duopoly with KSAZ. KUTP merged its operations with KSAZ into that station's studio facilities on West Adams Street.

=== From UPN to MyNetworkTV ===
Logo used when the station was re-branded as "PHX 45" from January to June 2006.

On January 24, 2006, the Warner Bros. unit of Time Warner and CBS Corporation announced that the two companies would shut down UPN and The WB and combine the networks' respective programming to create a new jointly owned broadcast network called The CW.

In unveiling the merged network, while WB and UPN affiliates owned by WB minority stakeholder Tribune Broadcasting and by CBS Television Stations were announced as charter outlets, none of the Fox-owned UPN stations—many of which were competitors to these stations—were chosen. Even though neither of these groups were present in Phoenix, as with the rest of the chain, Fox took immediate steps to remove UPN branding and promotions from KUTP, which branded as "PHX 45" for six months. The next month, News Corporation then announced the creation of its own secondary network, MyNetworkTV, to serve its own outgoing UPN stations as well as those that had not been selected for The CW. (Phoenix's WB affiliate, KASW, then signed an affiliation agreement with The CW; it is now an independent station.) Coinciding with the September 2006 launch of MyNetworkTV, Fox announced that KUTP would begin producing a local interactive dating show, My Dating Place, which aired on weeknights.

KUTP's logo as "My45", used from June 2006 to August 2017.

On August 7, 2017, KUTP was re-branded as "Fox 10 Xtra", a brand extension of KSAZ-TV, adding a two-hour block of the latter's live streaming YouTube channel Fox 10 News Now (now LiveNow from Fox) Monday through Friday between 10 a.m. and 12 noon. It now carries Fox 10 Talks at that time. The network rebranded again as "Fox 10 Plus" in September 2026 as part of a move by Fox to unify the branding of their MyNetworkTV affiliates.

== Local programming ==
=== Newscasts ===
Beginning in 2018, KSAZ-TV produced a 7 p.m. newscast, Fox 10 Xtra News at 7, for air on KUTP; this program, the station's first regular newscast, debuted in July 2018. It also carries newscasts at their usual time when KSAZ-TV has sports commitments at abnormal times, such as FIFA World Cup coverage or when prime time games run over 9 p.m. MST.

In February 2022, KUTP began simulcast programming from Fox Weather. This programming airs from 1 to 2 p.m. on weekdays, and from 4 to 6 a.m. on Sundays.

=== Sports programming ===
For 23 years, from 1988 to 2011, KUTP served as the over-the-air television home of the NBA's Phoenix Suns, televising all road games that did not have exclusive rights held by a national broadcast or cable television network, as well as selected home games, averaging at least 45 game telecasts each season. KUTP produced its own broadcast graphics, in conjunction with the Suns until the 2010–11 NBA season; this role of the regional television broadcaster of Suns games was taken over thereafter by corporate sibling Fox Sports Arizona (later Bally Sports Arizona) without any over-the-air rights, from 2011 to 2023.

Basketball returned to channel 45 in 2019 when Grand Canyon University entered into a deal to move men's basketball coverage from YurView Arizona, a cable channel, to KUTP; the games are produced by Sneaky Big Studios for GCU and KUTP. The agreement was renewed for the 2021–22 season, adding women's basketball and men's baseball broadcasts. The agreement was expanded for the 2022–23 season, adding a softball broadcast for the first time.

== Technical information ==
=== Subchannels ===
KUTP's transmitter is located on South Mountain. The station's signal is multiplexed:

Subchannels of KUTP
Subchannel	Res.	Short name	Programming
45.1	720p	KUTP	Main KUTP programming
45.2	480i	Movies!	Movies!
45.3	480i	BUZZR	Buzzr
45.4	480i	CatchyC	Catchy Comedy
45.5	480i	START	Start TV
10.2	720p	KSAZ HD	Fox (KSAZ-TV)

Simulcast of subchannels of another station

=== Analog-to-digital conversion ===
KUTP shut down its analog signal, over UHF channel 45, at 8:30 a.m. on June 12, 2009, the official date on which full-power television stations in the United States transitioned from analog to digital broadcasts under federal mandate. The station's digital signal continued to broadcast on its pre-transition UHF channel 26, using virtual channel 45.

=== Translators ===
- K18CB-D Bullhead City
- K16BP-D Cottonwood
- K28CW-D Flagstaff
- K14HG-D Kingman
- K15CR-D Lake Havasu City
- K14HC-D Prescott
