= Matt Gerson =

American radio host

Matt Gerson is an American talk radio host heard in Phoenix, Arizona on KIHP, the radio station owned by his family, and on nearly ten additional stations nationwide. His shows include Person to Person, Book Browse, and Matt's Angle on Movies, featuring his comments on current motion pictures.
