= KASW =

Television station in Phoenix, Arizona

ATSC 3.0 station
- Phoenix, Arizona; United States
- Channels: Digital: 27 (UHF); Virtual: 61
- Branding: The Spot – Arizona 61

Programming
- Affiliations: 61.1: Independent; for others, see § Subchannels

Ownership
- Owner: E. W. Scripps Company; (Scripps Broadcasting Holdings LLC)
- Sister stations: KNXV-TV

History
- First air date: September 23, 1995
- Former channel numbers: Analog: 61 (UHF, 1995–2009); Digital: 49 (UHF, 2002–2018)
- Former affiliations: The WB (1995–2006); FoxBox/4KidsTV (secondary, 2002–2008); The CW (2006–2023)

Technical information
- Licensing authority: FCC
- Facility ID: 7143
- ERP: 445 kW
- HAAT: 551.8 m (1,810 ft)
- Transmitter coordinates: 33°20′1″N 112°3′47″W

Links
- Public license information: Public file; LMS
- Website: www.thespottv.com/arizona-61

KASW (channel 61), branded as The Spot – Arizona 61, is an independent television station in Phoenix, Arizona, United States. It is owned by the E. W. Scripps Company alongside ABC affiliate KNXV-TV (channel 15). The two stations share studios on North 44th Street on the city's east side; KASW's primary transmitter is located on South Mountain. KASW is the high-power ATSC 3.0 (NextGen TV) station for the Phoenix area and provides the ATSC 3.0 broadcasts of six major Phoenix commercial stations.

KASW went on the air in 1995 as the Phoenix affiliate of The WB. Its first owner contracted with KTVK (channel 3) for programming and support services, and KTVK bought the station in 1999. In addition to being an affiliate of The WB and later The CW, the station also broadcast several secondary local sports teams at various times. As a result of KTVK's sale to the Meredith Corporation, KASW was sold to Nexstar Media Group in 2014. In 2019, Scripps acquired KASW from Nexstar as part of the latter's acquisition of Tribune Media.

In 2023, Scripps moved KASW's CW affiliation to a KNXV subchannel, and relaunched KASW as an independent station anchored by broadcasts of Arizona Coyotes hockey. With the team's franchise being deactivated after the 2023–24 season, the Coyotes were replaced with broadcasts of the Utah Mammoth (which acquired the Coyotes' hockey operations) and the Vegas Golden Knights syndicated from Scripps sister stations.

== Prior use of channel 61 in Phoenix ==
Prior to KASW's sign-on, the UHF channel 61 frequency in the Phoenix market was originally occupied by low-power station K61CA; that station carried a locally programmed music video format known as "Music Channel" and operated from March 15, 1983, until November 12, 1984, closing due to mounting debts and lack of cash to continue operating.

The construction permit for K61CA remained active for several more years; by 1988, it was owned by Channel 61 Development Corporation and was planned as a satellite-fed relay of KSTS, a Telemundo affiliate in San Jose, California.

== History ==
In November 1987, the Federal Communications Commission (FCC) allocated channel 61 for full-power use in Phoenix. KUSK-TV applied alongside four other groups; the field was narrowed to three, and Brooks Broadcasting, owned by Chandler farmer Gregory R. Brooks, was granted the permit in February 1991 by the FCC review board.

=== WB affiliation ===
KASW's original logo, used from 1995 until 1999

Little activity occurred on the permit, with the call sign KAIK; Brooks considered running home shopping on the station, and he was approached by KPHO-TV about potentially splitting rights to a new major league baseball team with the station.

In December 1994, Brooks entered into a local marketing agreement with Media America Corporation, then owners of KTVK (channel 3). KTVK, in the concluding phase of losing its ABC affiliation, had acquired a large inventory of children's programs, including Fox Kids, and the WB affiliation that did not fit with its planned programming as an independent station. Brooks, who was wanting to run a station catering to Phoenix's youth audience but had not been able to get the station going, was surprised when KTVK approached him; Delbert Lewis, the owner, owned a farm adjacent to one of Brooks's properties in Florence but had never met him.

KASW signed on September 23, 1995, as the first new full-power Phoenix television station since KUTP started up in December 1985. In addition to WB, Fox Kids and syndicated shows, as well as old movies on the nights when The WB did not air programming, it also aired a 30-minute newscast, known as NewsNight, produced by KTVK; the logo fit the station's youth appeal and was described by Dave Walker of The Arizona Republic as "reminiscent of an amoeba-shaped 1960s coffee table". Brooks, a member of the Church of Jesus Christ of Latter-day Saints, also aired the twice-yearly LDS General Conference on channel 61. KTVK and KASW also split over-the-air coverage rights to the Phoenix Coyotes hockey team when it moved to Phoenix in 1996, with 20 of the 25 games in the package airing on channel 61.

In July 1999, MAC America (the former Media America) announced it would sell KTVK to the Belo Corporation. Later that year, Belo announced that it would purchase KASW from Gregory Brooks, forming the first television duopoly in the Phoenix market just as they were being legalized.

=== From The WB to The CW ===
On January 24, 2006, the Warner Bros. unit of Time Warner and CBS Corporation announced that the two companies would shut down The WB and UPN and combine the networks' respective programming to create a new "fifth" network called The CW. The local UPN affiliate was KUTP, owned by Fox Television Stations. None of Fox's UPN stations, some of which were in the same market as charter network outlets owned by CBS and Tribune Broadcasting, were selected for the new network, and in late February, Fox announced it would start MyNetworkTV to serve its ex-UPN portfolio (including KUTP) and other stations that would not join The CW. On March 8, Belo signed an affiliation agreement with for KASW to become The CW's affiliate in Phoenix.

On June 13, 2013, Belo announced that KTVK and KASW would be acquired by the Gannett Company, owner of local NBC affiliate KPNX and the Arizona Republic. Since this would have given Gannett control of three stations in the Phoenix market, Gannett announced that it would spin off KTVK and KASW to Sander Media, LLC (operated by former Belo executive Jack Sander). While Gannett intended to provide services to the stations through a shared services agreement, KTVK and KASW's operations would have remained largely separate from KPNX and the Republic. On December 23, 2013, shortly after the approval and completion of the Gannett/Belo deal, the Meredith Corporation announced that it would purchase KTVK and the non-license assets of KASW from Sander Media and Gannett in a $407.5 million transaction. As Meredith already owned CBS affiliate KPHO-TV (channel 5), the KASW license was instead sold to SagamoreHill Broadcasting, with Meredith operating the station under a shared services agreement.

=== Sale to Nexstar and separation from KTVK ===
The FCC approved the sale of KASW and KTVK to SagamoreHill and Meredith on June 17, 2014, and the deal closed two days later. The two companies also agreed to voluntarily divest KASW to an independent buyer within 90 days of the deal's closure; on October 23, 2014, Meredith and SagamoreHill announced that it would sell KASW to Nexstar Broadcasting Group for $68 million, giving the company its first station in the Phoenix market. The FCC approved the sale to Nexstar on December 19, and the sale was consummated on January 30, 2015, ending the nearly 20-year partnership between KASW and KTVK. The station began migrating out of KTVK's facilities in September 2015.

=== Sale to Scripps; switch to independent status ===
CW61 Arizona logo, used until 2023

In March 2019, Nexstar announced it would purchase Tribune Media. This acquisition required divestitures of several overlapping stations; however, in addition to stations in markets where divestiture was necessary, Nexstar opted to also sell KASW to the E. W. Scripps Company, owner of local ABC affiliate KNXV-TV (channel 15), creating Phoenix's third TV duopoly. Although other stations acquired from the Nexstar/Tribune divestitures came from the Tribune portfolio, KASW was the only Nexstar station to be bought out by Scripps. The sale was approved by the FCC on September 16 and was completed on September 19. Scripps added newscasts from KNXV and also upgraded the station's syndicated programming inventory.

On November 20, 2023, CW programming moved to the second subchannel of KNXV-TV (which otherwise carried Antenna TV programming), and KASW became an independent station, with the branding of Arizona 61; the station aired a mix of local news, sports (including Arizona Coyotes hockey), and entertainment programming, as well as content from Scripps News. The rebranded station moved to channel 95 on Cox Communications cable systems in the Phoenix metro area, as KNXV's second subchannel took over KASW's channel 6 placement. This service in turn lost the CW affiliation on February 1, 2024, to KAZT-TV after Nexstar (who had acquired majority ownership of The CW) began programming the station under a multi-year time brokerage agreement with KAZT-TV's owner Londen Media Group. The station adopted The Spot branding on July 27, 2025.

== Programming ==
=== Local newscasts ===
From 1995 to 1997, KTVK produced a half-hour 9 p.m. newscast for KASW.

After the station was sold to Scripps, KNXV-TV began producing two local newscasts for KASW; both of them debuted in a gradual basis over the course of 2020. The first of these newscasts debuted on March 30, when KASW debuted a two-hour extension of KNXV's morning newscast, anchored by a separate team of anchors from the existing morning newscast; a noon news hour followed as daytime news viewership spiked during the COVID-19 pandemic. It was followed on August 30 by a half-hour long 9 p.m. newscast, anchored by the station's evening team.

=== Sports programming ===
KASW served as the first over-the-air broadcast home of the NHL's Phoenix Coyotes, airing the team's games from the time that the franchise moved to Phoenix in 1996 until 2006, when the Coyotes announced the move of their over-the-air telecasts to KAZT-TV. The Coyotes returned to KASW in November 2023 as part of Scripps's broadcast deal with the team, airing all regionally-televised games.

The Coyotes' franchise was deactivated after the 2023–24 season, and its hockey operations were purchased and relocated to Salt Lake City as the Utah Mammoth. The NHL granted Arizona's regional television territory to both the Mammoth and the Vegas Golden Knights—whose rights are held by Scripps' KUPX-TV and KMCC respectively. KASW has since broadcast both the Mammoth, and selected Golden Knights games as the schedule permits.

From 1997 to 2004, 2019 and again in 2025, KASW broadcast Arizona Rattlers arena football, and KASW also aired games of the Phoenix Mercury from 1997 through 1999. Phoenix Rising FC soccer was seen on KASW from 2019 through 2021.

== Technical information ==
Transmitters of KASW

=== Subchannels ===
The station's ATSC 1.0 channels are carried on the multiplexed signals of other Phoenix television stations:

Subchannels provided by KASW (ATSC 1.0)
Subchannel	Res.	Short name	Programming	ATSC 1.0 host
61.1	1080i	AZ 61	Main KASW programming	KNXV-TV
61.2	480i	Grit	Grit	KPNX
61.3	480i	mystery	Ion Mystery	KTVK
61.4	480i	HSN	HSN	KSAZ-TV

=== Analog-to-digital conversion ===
KASW shut down its analog signal, over UHF channel 61, on June 12, 2009, the official date on which full-power television stations in the United States transitioned from analog to digital broadcasts. The station's digital signal continued to broadcast on its pre-transition UHF channel 49, using virtual channel 61. The station was then repacked to channel 27 in 2019.

=== ATSC 3.0 ===
Subchannels of KASW (ATSC 3.0)
Subchannel	Res.	Short name	Programming
5.1	720p	KPHO-NG	CBS (KPHO-TV)
10.1	720p	KSAZ_NG	Fox (KSAZ-TV)
12.1	1080p	KPNX-NG	NBC (KPNX)
15.1	1080p	ABC15NG	ABC (KNXV-TV)
45.1	720p	KUTP-NG	MyNetworkTV (KUTP)
61.1	1080p	AZ61 NG	Main KASW programming

Subchannel broadcast with digital rights management

On March 27, 2020, this station was launched as a high-power ATSC 3.0 (NextGen TV) transmitter for Phoenix, operating alongside KFPH-CD and carrying the main program streams of KASW, KNXV, KSAZ and KUTP. It also is being used in the testing of single-frequency networks, with a second transmitter atop Shaw Butte.

On July 8, 2021, KPHO and KPNX were added to KASW from KFPH-CD, placing all four major network affiliates on the same ATSC 3.0 multiplex.

=== Translators ===
At the time of ATSC 3.0 conversion, KASW had three dedicated translators: K34EF-D in Kingman, K21EA-D in Lake Havasu City, and K34EE-D in Cottonwood.

Since conversion, programming from KASW has been seen through the translators of its ATSC 1.0 hosts. K34EE-D in Cottonwood was switched to rebroadcast KNXV-TV in June 2021.

== See also ==
- Channel 27 digital TV stations in the United States
- Channel 61 virtual TV stations in the United States
