= Mike Condello =

Michael Condello (May 6, 1946 – August 17, 1995) was an American rock musician, producer, and songwriter, who is sometimes credited mononymously as Condello.

== Early life ==
Mike Condello was born in Brooklyn, New York May 6, 1946 and moved to Phoenix, Arizona when he was 7.

By the time he was 14, Condello was already a key player the Phoenix music scene, playing in the Stage 7 Club's house band although four years underage. Before he was 20, he had records issued by several labels using different names. In 1963, Condello was hired by The Wallace and Ladmo Show, hosted by Bill "Wallace" Thompson and Ladimir Kwiatkowski, as bandleader.

== Rock and parodies ==
Condello formed a group called Hub Kapp and the Wheels, fronted by comedian Pat McMahon, that played garage rock, although their act was mainly a spoof of both the Beatles and Elvis Presley. The group's hits “Work, Work”, “Let’s Really Hear It For Hub Kapp” and others made them known in Hollywood and they appeared on The Steve Allen Show and the That Regis Philbin Show. Capitol Records signed them as a rock band, possibly ignoring the spoof element of the act. Hub Kapp and the Wheels were to prove an influence on teenager Vincent Furnier, who later became known as Alice Cooper.

As part of The Wallace and Ladmo Show, Condello had subsequently several more records released, many of which entered the repertoire of Dr. Demento and other comedy or parody acts, records such as “Soggy Cereal”, “Ho Ho Ha Ha Hee Hee Ha Ha” and “Pollen’s Found A Home In My Nose”. Others were parodies of Beatles music such as “A Day On The Tube”.

In 1967, Lee Hazlewood signed Condello's band, named them Last Friday's Fire, and released through his LHI Records three singles with them.

== Psychedelia ==
In the same year as the Hazlewood singles, Condello became involved in the formation of the parody ensemble Commodore Condello's Salt River Navy Band, which released two EPs and performed on The Wallace and Ladmo Show as well. Also in 1967, Condello was invited by the psychedelic rock band Superfine Dandelion to play on their song "Ferris Wheel."

In 1968, he formed a band named Condello, featuring a young Bill Spooner, later of The Tubes fame. They released only one album, titled Phase One. In 1969, the band released two singles and was dissolved. None of their record releases were a major hit, although subsequently the album was hailed as "one of the most acclaimed and influential psych albums of the late 60s" and a "psychedelic masterwork."

== Power pop ==
Mike Condello continued to be the music manager of the TV show until 1971, at which time he quit to work as a musician. He collaborated with the power-pop band Elton Duck, which featured future Bangles bassist Michael Steel. They played many concerts in Los Angeles, opening for the Knack, The Motels, The Tubes, and Phil Seymour. They recorded an album for Arista Records in the 1980s, but Clive Davis shelved it, and after a few months Elton Duck disbanded.

In 2012, Elton Duck's only album, through a crowdfunded effort, was officially issued for non-commercial use to benefit the Mike Condello Music Scholarship Fund.

== Session musician ==
Working as a session musician, Condello played on records of several artists, such as Jackson Browne, Juice Newton and the Tubes. He played guitar on Keith Moon's 1975 solo LP, Two Sides of the Moon.

== Death ==
On August 17, 1995, Condello, suffering from severe depression, killed himself by gunshot in his Santa Monica apartment.

== See also ==
- Allan Sherman
- "Weird Al" Yankovic
- Comedy rock
