= Channel 61 virtual TV stations in the United States =

The following television stations operate on virtual channel 61 in the United States:

- K34EE-D in Prescott-Cottonwood, Arizona
- KASW in Phoenix, Arizona
- KTFF-DT in Porterville, California
- KZJL in Houston, Texas
- WDSI-TV in Chattanooga, Tennessee
- WFGC in Palm Beach, Florida
- WOSC-CD in Pittsburgh, Pennsylvania
- WPPX-TV in Wilmington, Delaware
- WQHS-DT in Cleveland, Ohio
- WTIC-TV in Hartford, Connecticut
- WTSF in Ashland, Kentucky

The following stations, which are no longer licensed, formerly operated on virtual channel 61 in the United States:

- K21EA-D in Lake Havasu City, Arizona
- K34EF-D in Kingman, Arizona
- W25EG-D in Columbus, Georgia
