= Bill Thompson (television host) =

American television personality (1931–2014)

- Born: William Earnest Thompson; December 18, 1931; New York City, New York
- Died: July 23, 2014 (aged 82); Phoenix, Arizona
- Other name: Wallace
- Occupation: Television host
- Known for: The Wallace and Ladmo Show
- Spouse(s): Donna Cope (1952–?); Katie Frye (1974–2014; his death)
- Children: 3

William Earnest Thompson (December 18, 1931 – July 23, 2014), better known as Wallace, co-hosted The Wallace and Ladmo Show, a daily children's variety show broadcast on KPHO-TV in Phoenix, Arizona for 36 years. The program featured short comedy skits and cartoons and was known for humor that appealed to adults as well as children.

== Personal life ==
Thompson was born in New York City on December 18, 1931, to William and Marie Thompson, who had met while attending the University of Arizona. The Thompsons were a wealthy family who had made a large part of their fortune through mining operations in Arizona carried out by Bill's great-uncle, William Boyce Thompson, and grandfather, J. E. Thompson. As a child, Bill visited J. E. Thompson's estate in Phoenix, the Rancho Joaquina House, which is now listed on the National Register of Historic Places and on the historic register for the City of Phoenix. Bill's father traded stocks on Wall Street. When Bill was three, the family moved from Manhattan to Bronxville, New York, where he grew up near the Thompson family's mansion.

After graduating from Bronxville High school, Thompson attended DePauw University, where he studied art and acting, but was not an enthusiastic student. Around that time, he began writing children's stories featuring a character named Wallace Snead.

In 1952, Thompson dropped out of college, moved to Phoenix, married Donna Cope and started a family. They had three children: Carrie, Annie and Tony. They eventually divorced and, on March 4, 1974, he married Katie Frye.

Thompson died on July 23, 2014, of undisclosed causes in Phoenix.

== Career ==
After arriving in Phoenix, Thompson worked in the circulation department of The Phoenix Gazette newspaper. He eventually was hired by KPHO-TV and, on April 1, 1954, his character Wallace Snead first appeared on the KPHO-produced children's program, The Golddust Charlie Show. KPHO's program director, Bob Martin, soon offered him his own show and in January 1955 it debuted as It's Wallace? The following year, "Ladmo" (Ladimir Kwiatkowski) joined the program. On June 15, 1970, the title was officially changed to The Wallace and Ladmo Show, as it had come to be known colloquially. It continued broadcasting, Monday through Friday, until its last taping on December 29, 1989—one of the longest-running, daily, locally produced children's television shows in American broadcasting.

Thompson holds a prominent place in the cultural history of Arizona and has been inducted into Arizona Historical Society's hall of fame. In addition to his TV program, he made thousands of personal appearances and performed at live stage shows and in the 1960s he owned a chain of fast-food restaurants with his co-host, Ladmo. The Wallace and Ladmo Show won many awards, including nine Emmys, and has been credited by Steven Spielberg, Alice Cooper and generations of Phoenicians as having a formative influence on them.

After The Wallace and Ladmo Show left the air, Thompson, then 58, essentially retired from broadcasting and public life.
