= KPHO-TV =

Television station in Phoenix, Arizona

- Phoenix, Arizona; United States
- Channels: Digital: 17 (UHF); Virtual: 5
- Branding: CBS 5; Arizona's Family

Programming
- Affiliations: 5.1: CBS; for others, see § Technical information and subchannels

Ownership
- Owner: Gray Media; (Gray Television Licensee, LLC)
- Sister stations: KTVK; KPHE-LD

History
- First air date: December 4, 1949
- Former channel numbers: Analog: 5 (VHF, 1949–2009)
- Former affiliations: CBS (1949–1955); NBC (secondary, 1949–1953); ABC (secondary, 1949–1954); DuMont (secondary, 1949–1955); Independent (1955–1994); NTA (secondary, 1956–1961)
- Call sign meaning: "Phoenix"

Technical information
- Licensing authority: FCC
- Facility ID: 41223
- ERP: 1,000 kW
- HAAT: 507 m (1,663 ft); 530 m (1,739 ft) (CP)
- Transmitter coordinates: 33°20′2″N 112°3′43″W
- Translator(s): see § Translators

Links
- Public license information: Public file; LMS
- Website: www.azfamily.com

KPHO-TV (channel 5) is a television station in Phoenix, Arizona, United States, affiliated with CBS. It is owned by Gray Media alongside independent station KTVK (channel 3) and KPHE-LD (channel 44), a group known together as "Arizona's Family". The three stations share studios on North Seventh Avenue in Uptown Phoenix; KPHO-TV's transmitter is located on South Mountain on the city's south side.

KPHO-TV signed on in 1949 as Arizona's first television station and the only one approved prior to a nearly four-year freeze on new TV stations. It initially aired programming from all of the national networks, though it gradually lost them from 1953 onward as new stations signed on in the Phoenix area once the freeze ended. After losing CBS to KOOL-TV (channel 10) in 1955, channel 5 operated as an independent station for nearly 40 years, during which time it sometimes measured as the most-watched independent within its market in the United States; one of its productions, The Wallace and Ladmo Show, was among the longest-running local children's programs in the country. However, in the 1980s and early 1990s, it faced stiff competition in the guise of new independent outlets KNXV-TV and KUTP and saw declining ratings.

The station rejoined CBS in 1994 as the result of a group affiliation deal between the network and the Meredith Corporation, which owned the station for nearly 70 years, in the wake of channel 10 dropping CBS to affiliate with Fox. Though it had lower ratings than KTVK, CBS chose KPHO because of ties to Meredith in other cities. The CBS affiliation also forced the expansion of what had been a small news department into one broadcasting dozens of hours of local news a week.

In 2014, Meredith acquired KTVK as a spin-off of the merger of Gannett and the Belo Corporation; the two stations were combined under the Arizona's Family moniker, long associated with channel 3, in the KTVK studios but under KPHO-TV's management. Gray Television acquired Meredith's television division in 2021.

== History ==
=== Early history ===
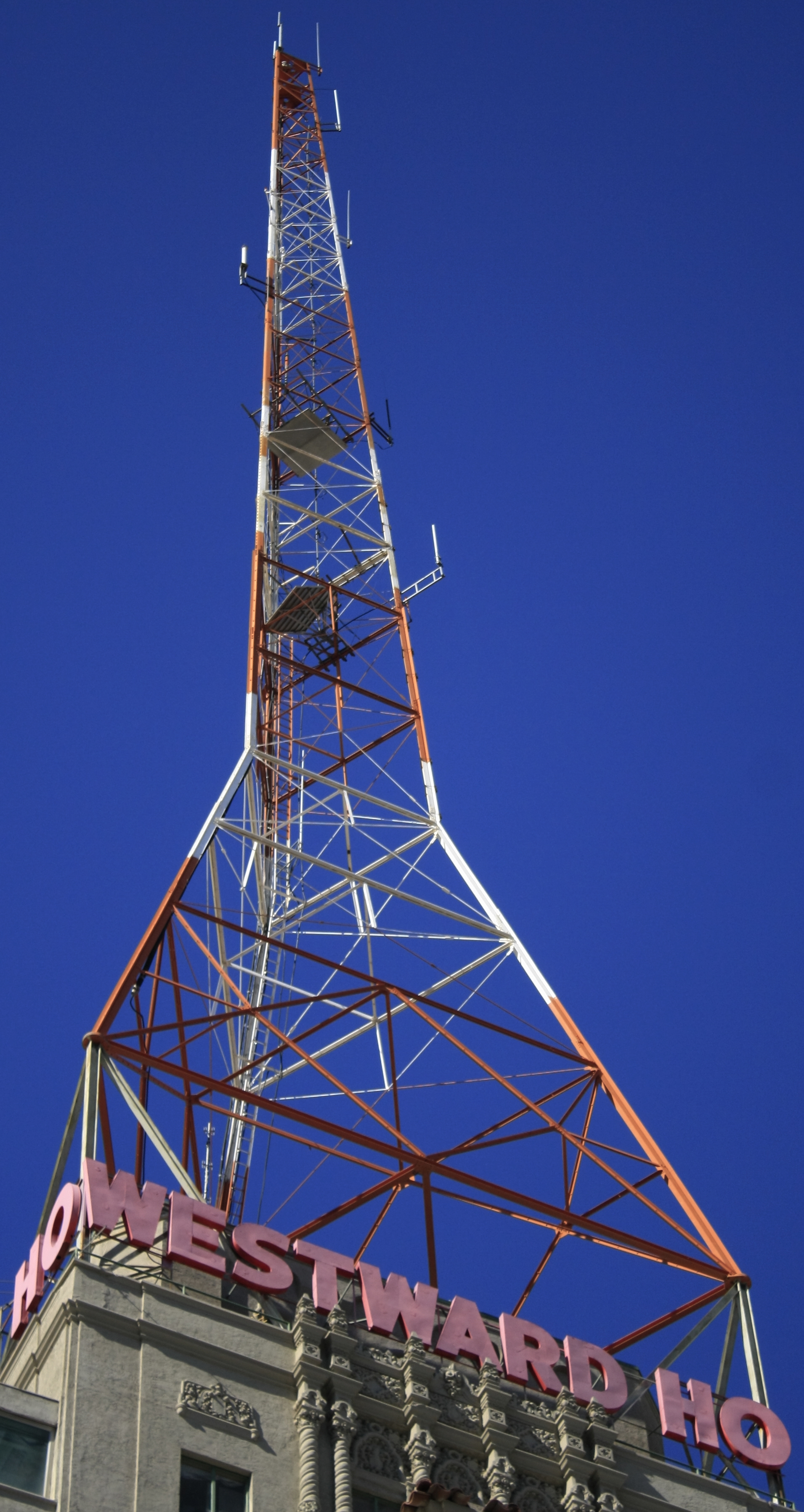
The mast atop the Westward Ho was built for and served as the first transmitter site of KPHO-TV.

On March 4, 1948, a consortium of four men doing business as the Phoenix Television Company—R. L. Wheelock, W. L. Pickens, H. H. Coffield, and John B. Mills—filed an application with the Federal Communications Commission (FCC) for a construction permit to build a new television station on channel 5, which was granted on June 2. This was the first application—and permit—for a television station in Arizona. The venture united Mills, the owner of downtown Phoenix's Westward Ho hotel, with three Texas oilmen. By the time it incorporated with the state in June 1949, Phoenix Television, Inc. had gained several new shareholders, notably including John Mullins, who later owned other radio and television properties. Another was Rex Schepp, the owner and manager of KPHO (then at 1230 AM; it moved to 910 kHz in 1949), which was Phoenix's ABC radio outlet; Mills then bought a 29 percent interest in KPHO.

By summer, construction had begun on a building adjacent to the Westward Ho, at 631 N. First Avenue, to house offices and studios for the station, which initially had the call letters KTLX. Phoenix Television also began work on a steel mast to be affixed to the structure for its antenna. The KTLX call sign was dropped on October 4 in favor of KPHO-TV, to match the radio station. Arizona's first television station began broadcasting on December 4, 1949; network coaxial cables had not reached Phoenix, so all programs were either on film or live.

For the next three and a half years, while the FCC froze all new awards of TV station construction permits, KPHO-TV remained the only television station in Phoenix and the state. In 1952, Phoenix Television sold the KPHO stations for $1.5 million to the Meredith Corporation of Des Moines, Iowa, whose only broadcast holdings at the time consisted of WHEN-TV in Syracuse, New York, and WOW radio and WOW-TV in Omaha, Nebraska. Loretta Young and Irene Dunne were reported to be interested in the months leading up to the sale, offering $1.25 million, but the owners of KPHO were looking for $2 million at the time, only lowering their price because of the impending arrival of new TV stations. By 1953, KPHO-TV was programming 100 hours a week of network programming, with all four major networks of the time—CBS, NBC, ABC, and DuMont—represented.

Local programming of the time included, at one point, three different live variety shows, as well as a show hosted by a young Marty Robbins. Other shows catered to women, kids, and sports fans. In the station's last year as a network affiliate, another major event occurred in station history. Ken Kennedy had created a character called "Gold Dust Charlie" to host Western movies. A sidekick was added when Bill Thompson, a 23-year-old artist, joined Charlie in the role of Wallace Sneed, Charlie's eastern cousin. Wallace soon became so popular that he received his own show of comedy sketches, It's Wallace. A studio cameraman, Ladimir Kwiatkowski, joined the show with his character Ladmo, and what would become known as The Wallace and Ladmo Show—a KPHO-TV fixture for decades—was born.

=== The independent years ===
The end of the FCC freeze in 1952 started the process that would bring to the Phoenix area three new television services within less than two years. The first of these stations launched on May 2, 1953: KTYL-TV (channel 12) in Mesa. KTYL-TV took on NBC programming from KPHO-TV; it was speculated that Meredith might have let that network go on purpose, reasoning it was likely to lose it anyway if KTAR radio, the Phoenix NBC radio affiliate, had its proposed television station approved. Phoenix got a second channel in October 1953, shared by KOOL-TV and KOY-TV, but channel 10 did not have a network affiliation; at the same time, CBS added KPHO-TV to the "must-buy" list on the rate card, which meant that the station would begin carrying some CBS programs (such as See It Now) whose sponsors did not buy into Phoenix. However, channel 10 took on ABC programming in early 1954. KOOL-TV then relinquished ABC to KTVK, which went on the air in February 1955, and became the new CBS affiliate on June 15 of that year—starting nearly four decades of independent television at channel 5.

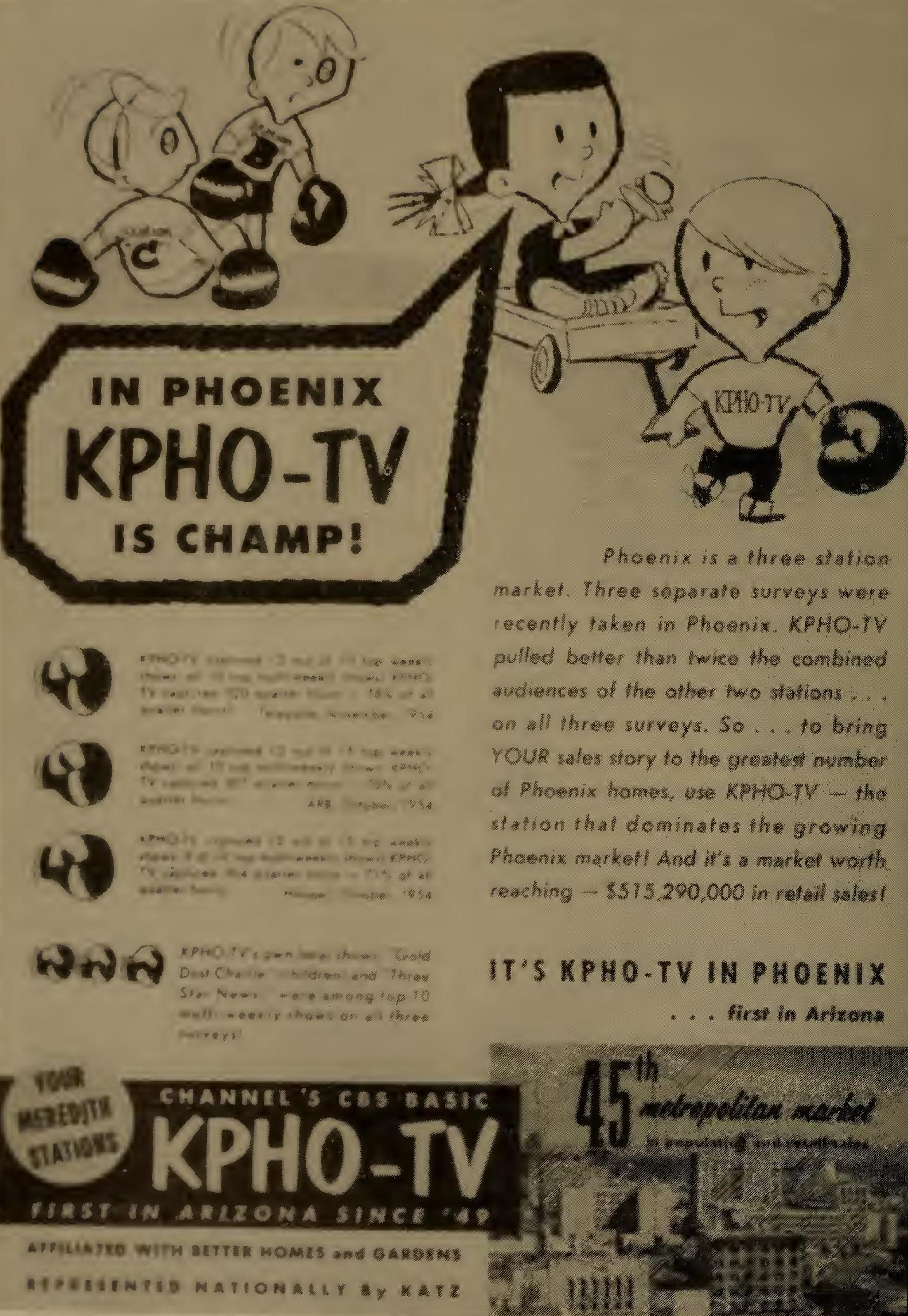
"In Phoenix KPHO-TV is champ!" ad from the Radio Annual and Television Yearbook, 1955

As an independent station, KPHO-TV programming consisted of movies—during the late 1950s, the station was briefly affiliated with the NTA Film Network—and off-network series, as well as local news and other productions. The station moved its transmission facility from the Westward Ho to South Mountain (where channels 3, 10, and 12 were located) on July 15, 1960; the new, 100,000-watt signal at a greater height expanded the station's range, and it also resulted in the cable system in Flagstaff adding channel 5 for the first time. From 1966 to 1967, the station was the subject of a 13-month NABET strike, then the longest in state history, which ended when the workers disavowed the union by a vote of 49 to 3. In 1970, ground was broken on a new, 42,000-square-foot (3,900 m^{2}) studio facility on Black Canyon Highway south of Indian School Road, which the station occupied in 1971. During the 1970s, KPHO became a regional superstation that was available on cable television in much of Arizona and New Mexico, as well as parts of California. By 1979, the station was on 43 cable systems serving more than 76,000 total subscribers.

The Meredith-era "TV5" logo used from 1980 to 1993

While KPHO-TV gained its first independent competition in 1967, with the arrival of KPAZ-TV on channel 21, the new outlet focused more on specialty and Spanish-language programs. It was little competition for channel 5, which was found by an American Research Bureau survey in 1975 to be the number-one independent station in the country in terms of viewing share. By this time, KPHO-TV was the third highest-rated station in Phoenix in total-day ratings, ahead of KTVK, long an underperforming ABC affiliate. KPAZ-TV closed and reopened as a full-time religious outlet in 1977. Two years later, though, KNXV-TV (channel 15), a hybrid independent and subscription television station, launched; it became a full-time independent in 1983. Even though channel 5 was the leading independent in the market, the upstart Fox Broadcasting Company opted to affiliate with channel 15 in 1986 after Scripps-Howard Broadcasting purchased the station; Fox and KPHO could not agree on a time slot for The Late Show. Landing the Fox affiliation made KNXV a very strong competitor against KPHO. As the station attempted to move into a new era, another ended: The Wallace and Ladmo Show aired its last episode on December 29, 1989, when Wallace retired. By 1991, with KNXV and 1985 startup KUTP cutting into channel 5's ratings alongside the rise of cable TV and the VCR, Barbara Holsopple, media writer for the Phoenix Gazette, declared that KPHO was "fighting for its life".

Early in 1994, Meredith verbally agreed to affiliate KPHO with The WB, which was set to launch the following year in January 1995, though the affiliation was never solidified in a written contract.

=== Returning to CBS ===
On May 23, 1994, New World Communications signed an agreement with Fox to convert twelve of its stations to the network, resulting in a massive wave of affiliation switches throughout the country; locally, KSAZ-TV—which New World was in the process of acquiring from Citicasters—was included in the deal. A month later, seeking to head off what would have been a disastrous outcome for the network, ABC renewed its affiliation agreement with the Scripps-owned ABC affiliates in Detroit and Cleveland and moved to Scripps stations in Tampa, Baltimore and Phoenix; Scripps successfully pressured ABC, which wanted to remain with top-rated KTVK, to move over to soon-to-be former Fox affiliate KNXV.

CBS now had two choices for a new Phoenix affiliate: KTVK and KPHO-TV. While the former was higher-rated, the latter had several strategic advantages relating to Meredith's ownership of other stations. It owned KCTV in Kansas City, Missouri, a longtime CBS affiliate in a market where the NBC affiliation had become available, and it owned WNEM-TV in Bay City, Michigan, an NBC affiliate whose signal covered the outer fringes of Detroit—a market where the network was about to be relegated to the UHF band. On June 30, 1994, CBS announced it had affiliated with KPHO-TV and WNEM-TV; Tony Malara, the head of CBS affiliate relations, noted that the Meredith–CBS partnership was a factor in the decision and denied that it had been pressured by threats from Meredith to change network affiliations in Kansas City. (It was not the first time CBS had looked at a return to channel 5. It had attempted to negotiate a purchase of the station from Meredith in 1988; despite CBS's long relationship with what was then KTSP-TV, network officials were interested in owning a station in the fast-growing Sun Belt. Ultimately, the two parties could not agree on a purchase price.)

CBS officially returned to KPHO on September 10, 1994, three days after New World's purchase of KSAZ-TV—which became an independent before affiliating with Fox three months later—was finalized. A $1 million promotion blitz was undertaken by Meredith and CBS, along with a planned doubling of the station's local news output.

=== Becoming part of the "Family" ===
In 2013, Gannett—owner of KPNX and The Arizona Republic—announced it would merge with Belo, which owned KTVK and KASW (channel 61). As FCC rules restrict one company from owning more than two television stations in the same market, Gannett announced that it would spin off KTVK and KASW to Sander Media, LLC, a company operated by former Belo executive Jack Sander, with their operations to remain largely separate from KPNX and The Republic. However, in St. Louis, Gannett owned NBC affiliate KSDK while Belo owned CBS affiliate KMOV. The Department of Justice required the outright sale of one of the two St. Louis stations in lieu of a transfer to Sander, noting a combination of the two would put Gannett in a dominant position in the local advertising market.

Concurrent with the closure of the merger on December 23, 2013, Meredith announced it would acquire KMOV, KTVK, and assets used in KASW's operation, with the KASW license being transferred to SagamoreHill Broadcasting. The transaction closed in mid-2014, kicking off a period of integration of the two stations. On August 7, Meredith announced plans to merge the two stations' operations at KTVK's studio in the Central Avenue Corridor, citing its significantly larger size in comparison to KPHO's facilities.

The union of KTVK and KPHO-TV's news operations, marketed under the "Arizona's Family" banner long associated with KTVK, came with the loss of 14 jobs across both stations. KPHO general manager Ed Munson headed the combined operation until his 2018 retirement.

=== Sale to Gray Television ===
On May 3, 2021, Gray Television announced its intent to purchase the Meredith Local Media division, including KPHO and KTVK, for $2.7 billion. In Arizona, Gray already owned CBS affiliate KOLD-TV in Tucson. The sale was completed on December 1.

In 2024, Gray became the official television partner of the Arizona Cardinals, taking over from KPNX. KPHO-TV and KOLD-TV would air preseason games, while the Arizona's Family group would offer additional team-related programming as well as high school football and flag football.

== News operation ==
KPHO-TV has operated a news department since it signed on. In the early days, there were no news film facilities that permitted processing of film in the state; all film had to be processed in California. This changed in 1952, when Ralph Painter figured out how to project processed film from a negative, saving time; this allowed him to get footage of a ballroom fire on the air—which he had processed in his own bathtub—in hours, not days. When it became independent in 1955, KPHO was one of the few such stations of the time with a functioning news department. It aired a noon and early evening newscast and a late news brief. In 1973, KPHO became the first independent to go up against the major network stations directly with a seven-day 10 p.m. newscast. This program shifted to 9:30 p.m. in 1975, where it remained for more than 15 years, with the station producing an hour of news a day: a midday show at 11:30 a.m. and a 9:30 p.m. newscast. This lasted until 1991, when the 9:30 p.m. show was expanded to a full hour at 9. Even then, KPHO's news department was one-third the size of its network competitors. Despite being an independent station, KPHO news was competitive through the 1970s and 1980s. It often out-rated KTVK and by 1985, in the words of The Arizona Republic television columnist Bud Wilkinson, had managed to "stake a firm claim as the third-rated news department in town". However, it was the only independent station producing a prime-time newscast that did not see its news ratings grow from 1982 to 1989, of 21 stations that did news in 1982. By May 1994, the station was in the early stages of planning a two-hour morning news program from 7 to 9 a.m., which would have been only the second such show from a non-Fox independent station.

KPHO reassuming the CBS affiliation required massive changes in the newsroom, including an expanded staff, in order to begin production of a variety of newscasts that channel 5 did not offer. A 6 p.m. newscast was added with the switch, and the 9 p.m. program was replaced with the "Arizona 5-Minute News", which led into a rerun of M*A*S*H at 10:05. The latter—paired with Seinfeld instead of M*A*S*H after 1995 and later adjusted to eight minutes—was intended as a stopgap, but it turned out to be a massive money-maker for the station and finished second in the time slot.

Over time, KPHO's news offerings grew more typical for a CBS affiliate. The station began airing a 5 p.m. newscast in 1995 intended to appeal to younger audiences; assignment reporters for the show included Tim and Willy, the morning hosts at country music radio station KMLE. In 1997, channel 5 started an hour-long morning newscast which had grown to 4:30 a.m., well before such a start was common in the industry, by 2000. The 10 p.m. newscast was expanded to a full 35 minutes on January 1, 2001, at which time the morning newscast was changed to start at 5. In 2004, KPHO began airing the CBS Evening News at 6 p.m. and presenting a 6:30 p.m. newscast, the market's first.

On March 1, 2009, KPHO-TV began sharing a news helicopter as part of an agreement with KTVK and KPNX. The helicopter was operated by Helicopters Inc. and known as "News Chopper 20", a combination of the channel numbers of the three stations—3, 5 and 12. All four Phoenix television newsrooms shared a helicopter as of 2021. Further pooling of resources—with a different set of local stations—came later that year when KPHO-TV entered into an agreement to pool certain newsgathering resources with KSAZ-TV and KNXV-TV. Each station provided employees to the pool service in exchange for the sharing of video.

=== On-air staff ===
- Sean McLaughlin, anchor

=== Former on-air staff ===
- Robert Ivers, anchor
- Brandon Lee Rudat, anchor
- Tammy Leitner, investigative reporter

== Technical information and subchannels ==
KPHO-TV broadcasts from South Mountain. Its signal is multiplexed:

Subchannels of KPHO-TV
Subchannel	Res.	Short name	Programming
5.1	1080i	KPHO-HD	CBS
5.2	480i	Cozi	Cozi TV
5.3	480i	DABL	Dabl
5.4	480i	Shop LC	Shop LC
44.2	720p	KPHE-HD	Arizona's Family Sports (KPHE-LD)

Simulcast of subchannels of another station

On December 20, 2006, KPHO began broadcasting a local weather multicast service called CBS 5 Weather Now on digital subchannel 5.2, displaying a loop of current weather conditions and graphics. The service was moved to KTVK as subchannel 3.3 in 2015, at which time Cozi TV was added to 5.2.

During the 2006 and 2007 NCAA men's basketball tournaments, KPHO used pop-up digital subchannels and split the analog and 5.1 digital channels to air four games at once in the early rounds.

KPHO-TV's primary subchannel is available in ATSC 3.0 format on KASW. As part of the Phoenix-area hosting plan for subchannels of KASW and KFPH-CD—Phoenix's two ATSC 3.0 stations—KFPH-CD's subchannel of Ion Mystery is placed on the KPHO multiplex.

=== Analog-to-digital conversion ===
KPHO-DT was the first digital television facility in operation in Phoenix, going on the air in 1999. The station ended regular programming on its analog signal, over VHF channel 5, at 11:59 p.m. on June 12, 2009, the official date on which full-power television stations in the United States transitioned from analog to digital broadcasts under federal mandate. The station's digital signal continued to broadcast on its pre-transition UHF channel 17.

As part of the SAFER Act, KPHO kept its analog signal on the air until June 26 to inform viewers of the digital television transition through a loop of public service announcements from the National Association of Broadcasters.

=== Translators ===
KPHO is rebroadcast on the following translator stations:

- Bullhead City (Katherines Landing): K05MR-D
- Chloride: K30GG-D
- Cottonwood, etc.: K29LM-D
- Dolan Springs: K34PE-D
- Flagstaff: K17MO-D
- Globe/Miami: K27KS-D
- Kingman: K18LZ-D
- Lake Havasu City: K26OK-D
- Meadview: K15LR-D
- Prescott: K30JD-D
- Topock/Bullhead City (Goldroad Crest-Oatman): K21FU-D
