= Ladmo =

American actor (1928–1994)

- Kwiatkowski with a Ladmo Bag
- Born: Ladimir Walter Kwiatkowski; July 13, 1928; Cleveland, Ohio
- Died: March 2, 1994 (aged 65); Mesa, Arizona
- Other name: Ladmo
- Occupation: television host
- Known for: The Wallace and Ladmo Show

Ladimir Walter Kwiatkowski (July 13, 1928 – March 2, 1994), better known as Ladmo, was an American television personality who co-hosted The Wallace and Ladmo Show, a daily children's variety show broadcast on KPHO in Phoenix, Arizona. The program featured clowns, cartoons and short comedy skits.

== Personal life ==
Kwiatkowski was born in Cleveland, Ohio, to Walter and Florence Kwiatkowski. His father was a Cleveland police detective. He graduated from high school in 1947. In 1949 Kwiatkowski decided to attend Arizona State College in Tempe. He wanted to be a sports broadcaster. He played baseball with the ASU team and was considered by scouts from the Cleveland Indians.

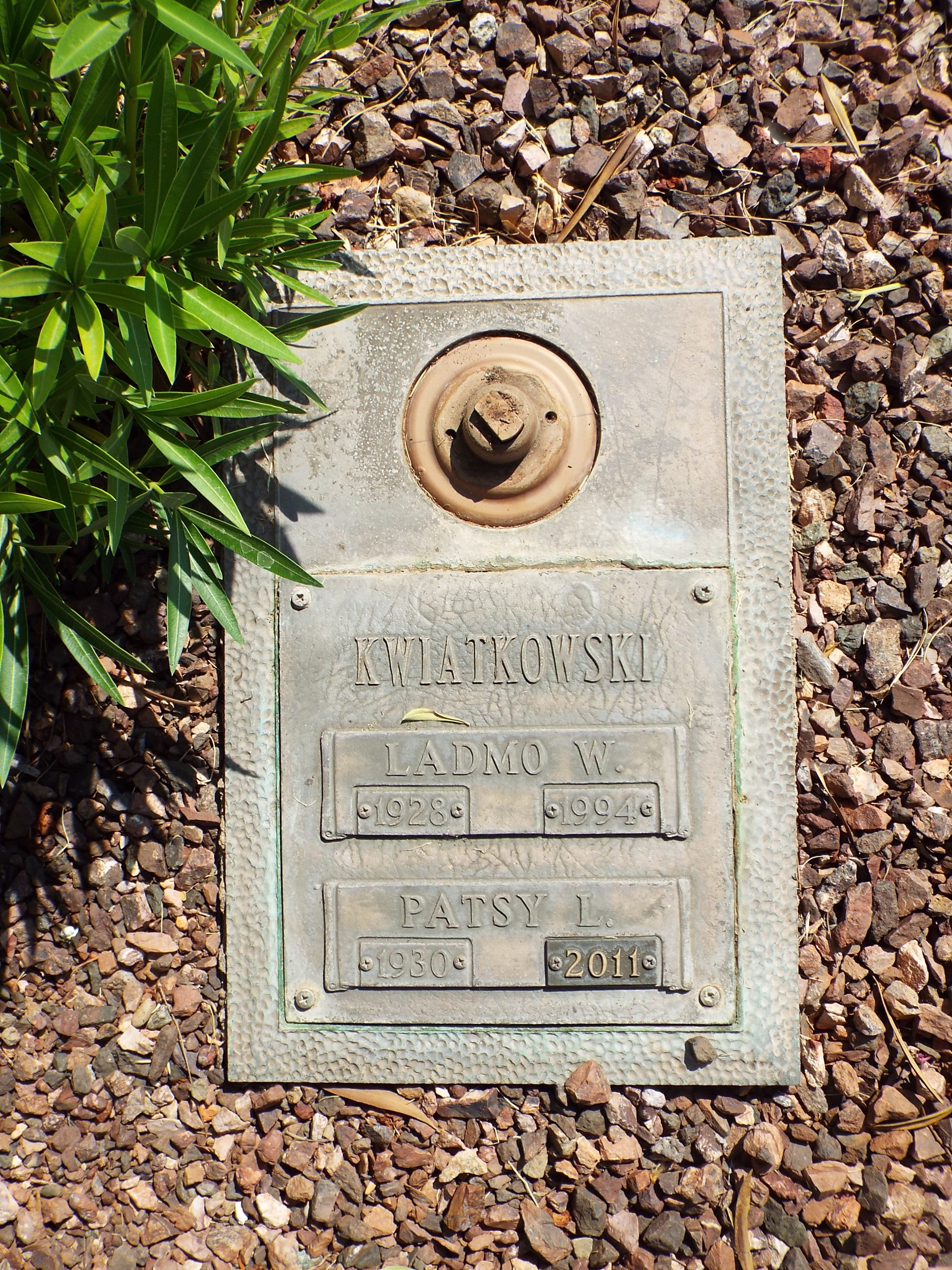
Kwiatkowski's grave in St. Francis Catholic Cemetery in Phoenix.

While at ASU, Kwiatkowski met and married his wife Patsy Lou Killough (March 31, 1951). He graduated from ASU with a degree in journalism and decided to try to get a job in television. “If I get a job in television, I’m going to stay. If I can’t get a job in TV, I’m going to take the baseball offer.”

Kwiatkowski had five children. He died of lung cancer in Tempe, Arizona on March 2, 1994.

== Professional career ==
The day after Kwiatkowski's graduation, in 1955, he went to the KPHO-TV studios and met with the general manager, Dick Rawls (the future inspiration for the character Mr. Grudgemeyer) and they hit it off. One hour after returning home, Lad received a call to start work the next day.

While working as a cameraman for KPHO, Kwiatkowski became involved with the It's Wallace? program, hosted by Bill Thompson (Wallace). He developed his Ladmo character there, as well as his trademark "Ladmo Bags," which were given out as prizes on the show. Kwiatkowski and Thompson thus began a professional partnership that lasted decades—with It's Wallace? eventually being renamed The Wallace and Ladmo Show. Its final taping was on December 29, 1989, after a 36-year run, becoming one of the longest-running daily children's television shows in American broadcasting. By that time the show had won many awards, including nine Emmy awards.

After The Wallace and Ladmo Show ended, Kwiatkowski retired from broadcasting. He remained active in various social programs and charities.
