= KIHP (AM) =

Catholic radio station in Mesa, Arizona

- Mesa, Arizona; United States
- Broadcast area: Phoenix metropolitan area
- Frequency: 1310 kHz

Programming
- Format: Catholic radio
- Network: Relevant Radio

Ownership
- Owner: Relevant Radio, Inc.

History
- First air date: 1946
- Former call signs: KTYL (1946–1956); KBUZ (1956–1977); KQXE (1977–1980); KZZP (1980–1990); KXAM (1990–2009)
- Former frequencies: 1490 kHz (1946–1951)
- Call sign meaning: Immaculate Heart Phoenix

Technical information
- Licensing authority: FCC
- Facility ID: 19468
- Class: B
- Power: 3,400 watts (day); 260 watts (night)
- Transmitter coordinates: 33°21′43″N 111°58′03″W
- Translator: 102.9 K275CP (Phoenix)

Links
- Public license information: Public file; LMS
- Webcast: Listen live
- Website: relevantradio.com

KIHP (1310 AM) is a noncommercial radio station licensed to Mesa, Arizona, United States, and serving the Phoenix metropolitan area. It is owned and operated by Relevant Radio, carrying their Catholic radio programming. KIHP is also heard over FM translator K275CP at 102.9 MHz in Phoenix.

== History ==
The station signed on the air in 1946 as KTYL, broadcasting on 1490 kHz and owned by Harkins Theatres. It was the second station in Mesa, Arizona, signing on three days after KARV (1400 AM). Both stations ran 250 watts full-time with non-directional antennas — the maximum power allowed for Class IV (now Class C) stations at the time. Two years later, KTYL bought and shut down KARV. Its frequency was reactivated in Phoenix in 1950 as KONI.

Harkins also put Arizona's first FM station–KTYL-FM 104.7–on the air in 1950. Three years later, Harkins put Phoenix's second TV station–KTYL-TV channel 12, the eventual KPNX–on the air. As with the AM station, both stations were originally located in, and are still licensed to, Mesa.

KTYL moved to 1310 in the early 1950s, and eventually increased its power to 5,000 watts day and 500 watts night. In 1958, it became KBUZ, a beautiful music station. It used the slogan "Drive with care, and KBUZ, everywhere." It moved to the Thomas Shopping Mall on the east side of Phoenix. The format was simulcast on KBUZ-FM 104.7. KBUZ-AM-FM played quarter hour sweeps of soft, instrumental music, including Broadway and Hollywood show tunes.

On January 1, 1977, the station became KQXE, with a personality-oriented oldies format. For three years it was successful, going up against market leader KOY (550 AM). Management assembled a group of talented disc jockeys from the Phoenix radio region and other cities, including Phil Barry from Detroit and Phil Gardner from Cleveland.

The station's last logo as KXAM.

After owners Southwestern Media sold the station to Western Cities Broadcasting, KQXE transitioned to a Top 40 format under the call sign KZZP, which it shared with KZZP-FM 104.7. After a ten-year-long simulcast, 1310 AM split from KZZP-FM on February 19, 1990, and became KXAM. It initially was an adult standards station. After a few years, KXAM became a talk station, airing syndicated shows including Laura Ingraham, Dave Ramsey and Matt Gerson. Gerson was part of the family that controlled KXAM's owner, Embree Broadcasting, and hosted a political talk show until March 2009.

In 2009, Embree Broadcasting announced that KXAM would cease operations. Two of the station's local programs, Culinary Confessions (a food show) and The Bandwagon (a sports show) moved to KAZG soon after the announcement. Although KXAM employees had offered to buy the station, the Gerson family turned their offers down, insisting at that time on returning the license to the Federal Communications Commission. The station went silent on April 16, 2009.

On June 1, 2009, the Gerson family backed off from its plans to surrender the KXAM license. They sold it to IHR Educational Broadcasting for $1 million. It returned to the air as KIHP, with Catholic programming from Immaculate Heart Radio, on December 17. The station changed its call letters to KIHP, airing Catholic talk and teaching programming. It began airing the Relevant Radio network when IHR Educational Broadcasting and Starboard Media Foundation consummated their merger on June 30, 2017.

== Translator ==
Broadcast translator for KIHP
Call sign	Frequency	City of license	FID	ERP (W)	HAAT	Class	FCC info
K275CP	102.9 FM	Phoenix, Arizona	138167	150	16 m (52 ft)	D	LMS
