= South Mountains (Arizona) =

Mountain range in south Phoenix, Arizona

Coordinates: 33°20′0″N 112°3′45″W

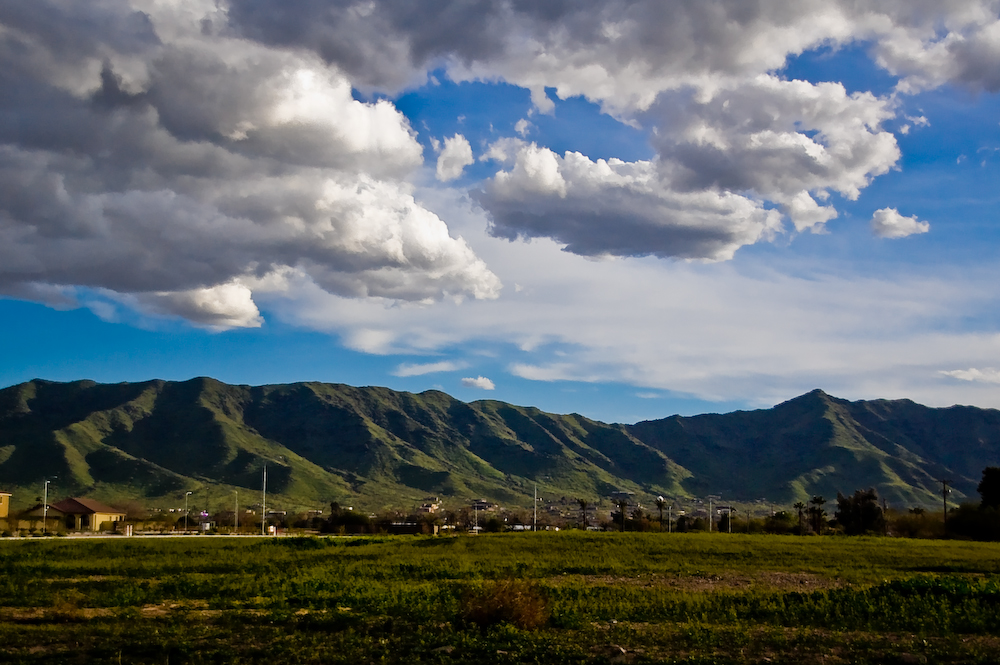
South Mountain seen from Laveen, Arizona

The South Mountains (O'odham: Muhaḍagĭ Doʼag, Yavapai: Wi:ki'tiyeda, Maricopa: Vii Kwxas), known locally as simply South Mountain, is a mountain range in central Arizona in south Phoenix, Arizona. The majority of the range is public land managed by the City of Phoenix as South Mountain Park, but a small portion extends into the Gila River Indian Community.

Geologically, the South Mountains are thought to be a metamorphic core complex: evidence of movement of the North American tectonic plates from southwest to northeast and northeast to southwest, pushing up a series of mountain ranges including South Mountain. Other ridges with parallel orientation lie within the basin covered by basin fill sediments. The structural basin forms the Phoenix metro area, which appears flat like a lake around mountains that rise over it like islands. The buried ridges are in the same orientation as the South Mountains, about one km high, and about one km apart from peak to peak, perhaps about 15 of them underneath the basin fill.

The mountain, along with the nearby Sierra Estrella, is considered sacred by the Akimel O'odham and the Kwevkepaya band of Yavapai. This had become a point of contention prior to the construction of Arizona State Route 202 through the range's southwestern corner. The construction of the highway ultimately left a gash in the range at the border of the Gila River Indian Community within the City of Phoenix and South Mountain Preserve.

The South Mountain Preserve is part of the Phoenix Parks System and is the second largest municipal park in Arizona, and the 13th largest municipal park in the world. The preserve features recreational facilities such as ramadas, hiking and mountain biking trails, and equestrian facilities.

== Peaks ==
The major peaks of the South Mountains are (from West to East):

- Maricopa Peak (2,523 ft)
- Goat Hill (2,526 ft)
- Mount Suppoa (South Mountain, TV Tower Peak), highest point in the mountains at 2,690 ft (820 m). Contains numerous radio and television transmitting towers serving the Phoenix area, including those of the ABC, CBS, FOX and NBC network-affiliated stations.

== Features ==
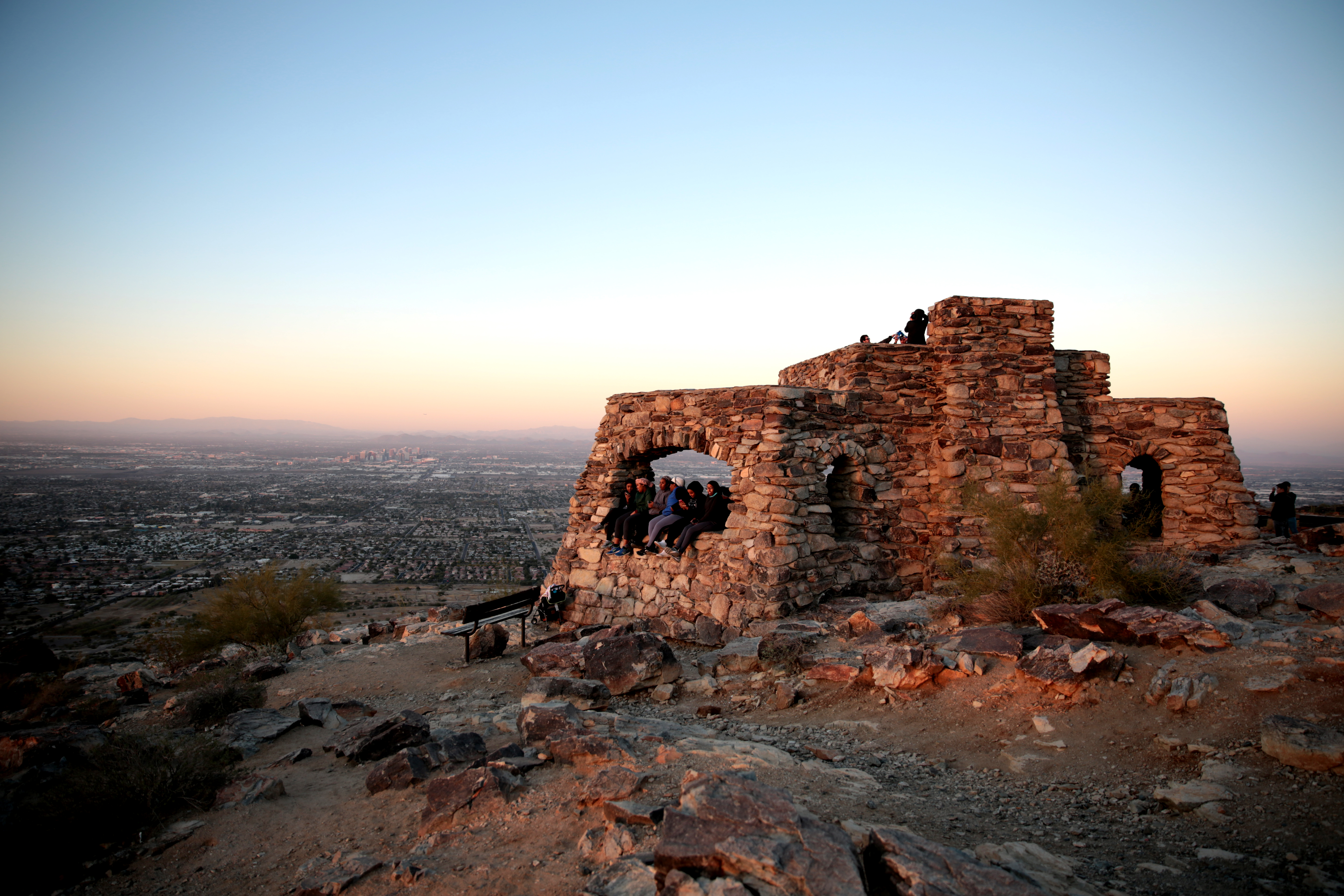
Dobbins Lookout at the summit of South Mountain.

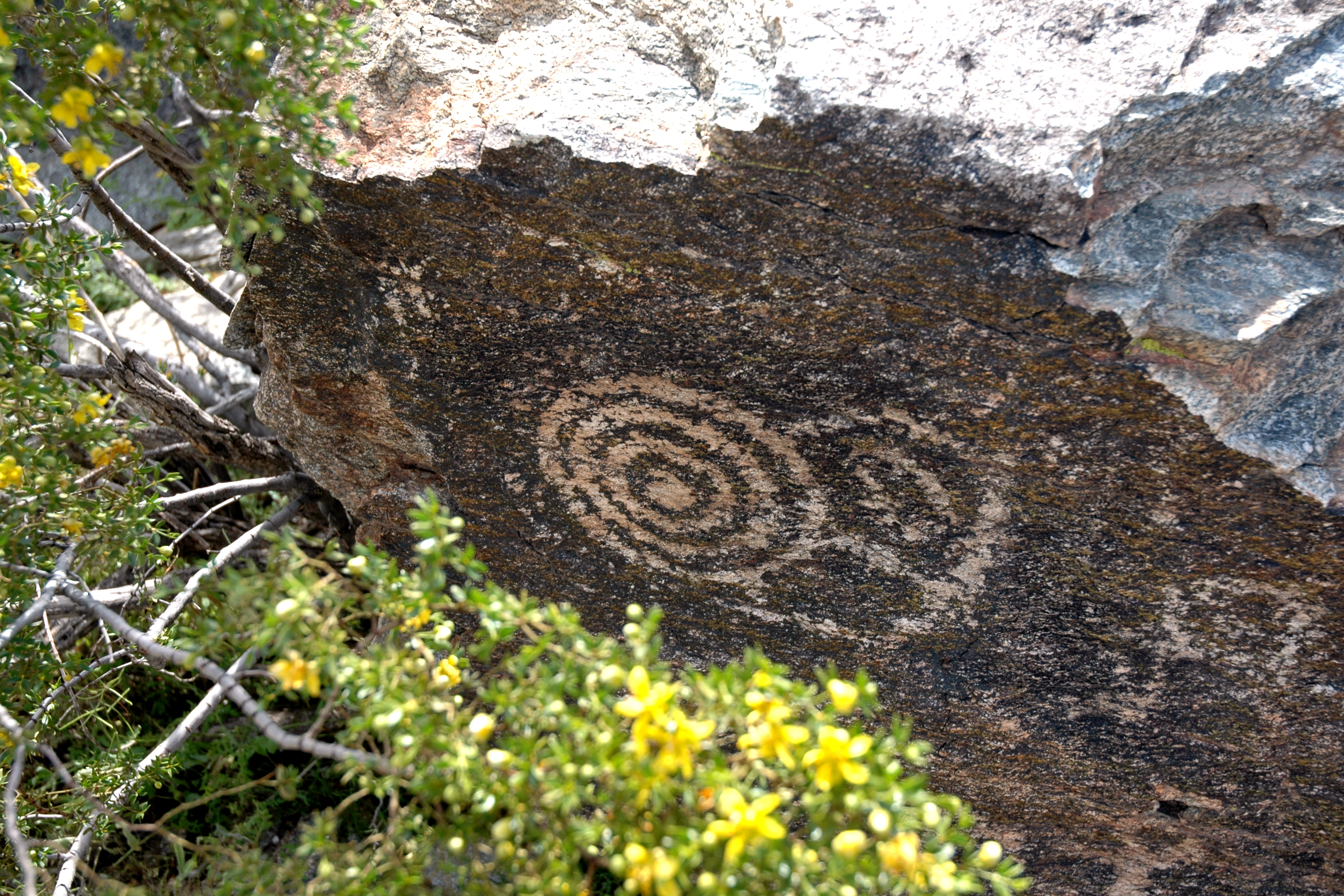
One of many petroglyphs in South Mountain Park

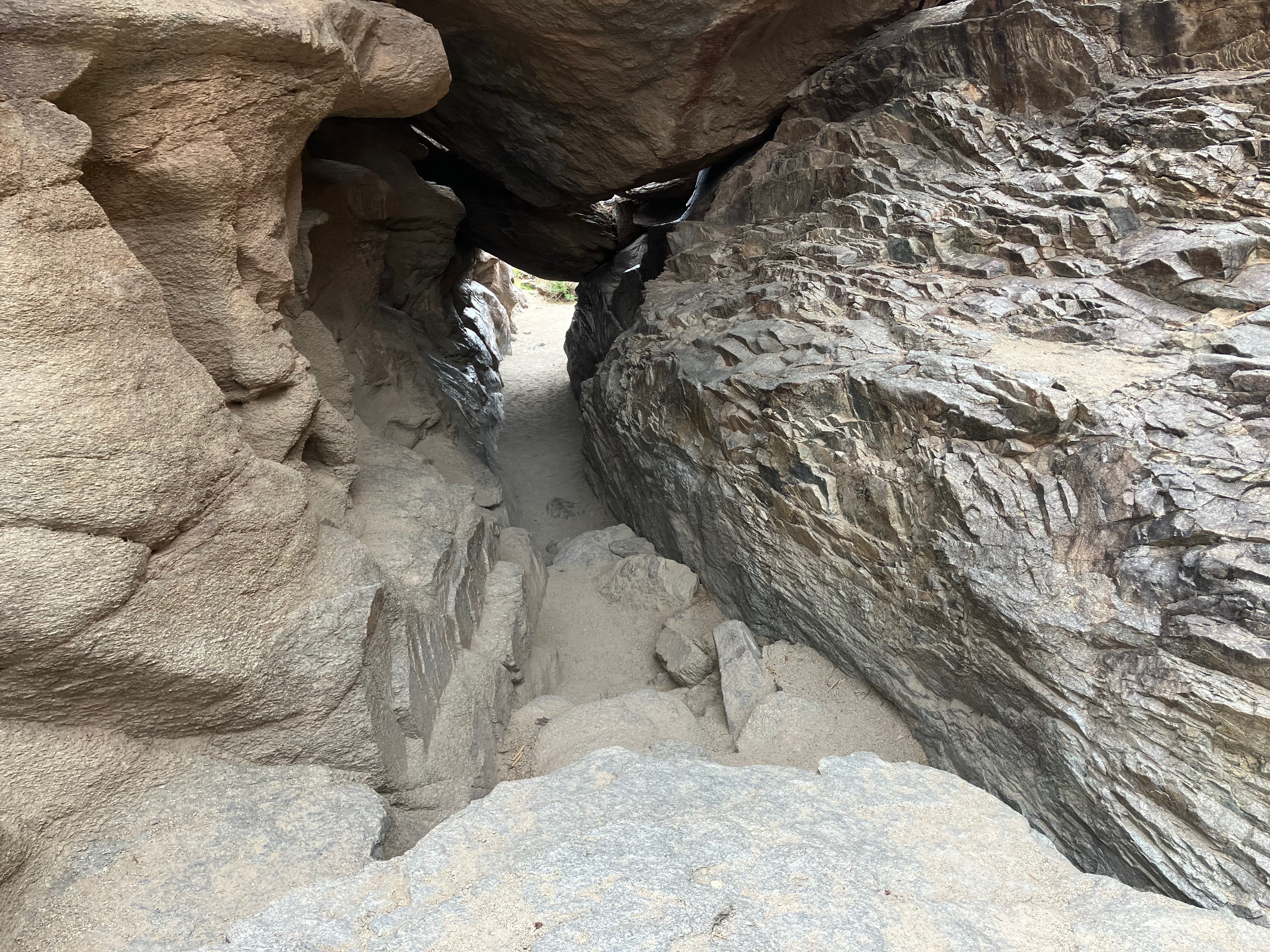
Natural Tunnel on the Hidden Valley Trail

- The South Mountains comprise three mountain ranges: the Guadalupe Range, Gila Range and Ma Ha Tuak Range.
- Gila Valley Lookout is the highest point accessible by trail at 2,620 ft (800 m).
- Alta Ridge is the ridge on the eastern end of Maricopa peak.
- Telegraph Pass is a gap that separates the Guadalupe Range to the east and the Gila Range to the west.
- Fat Man's Pass, formerly known as Wonder Rift, and Natural Tunnel are rock formations that provide access to Hidden Valley Trail.
- Mystery Castle is in the foothills on the north side and was built from odd materials and trash around 1930 as a private residence.
- There are more than 30 communications towers on the summit of Mount Suppoa.
- There are ruins of both ancient Indian and more contemporary origin, and there are many petroglyphs carved into the desert varnish on the rocks.

== Geography and ecology ==
A spur plateau of the Salt River Mountains was described by an early survey of the area as the dividing feature of the Salt River valley.

There are a variety of flora and fauna within the Salt River Mountains. One of the notable tree species here is the elephant tree, Bursera microphylla.

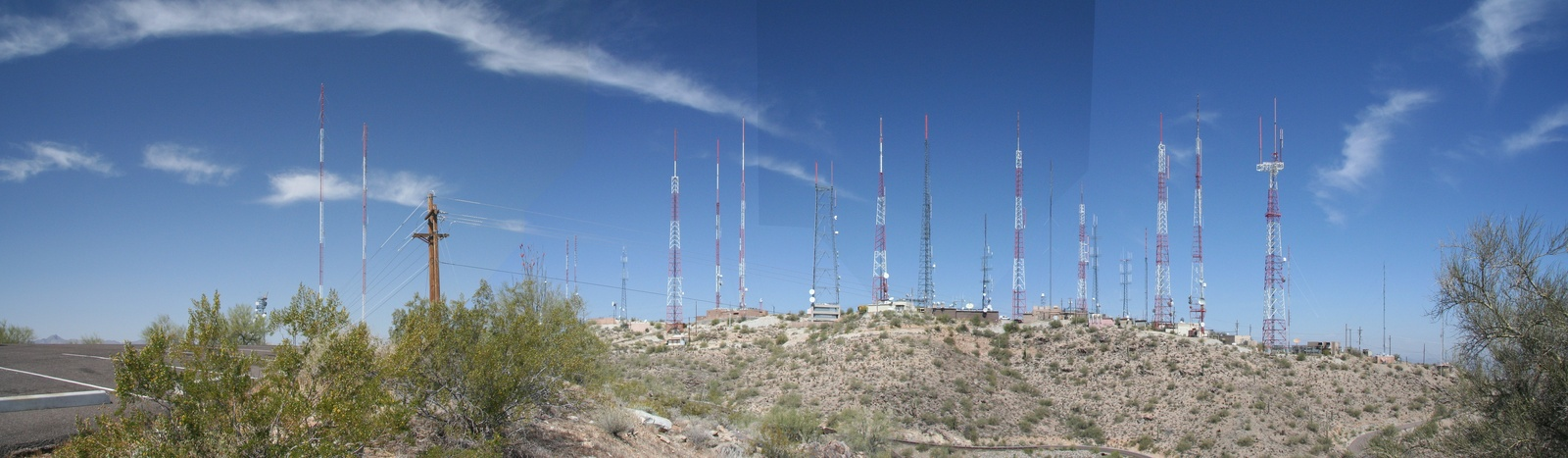
South Mountain radio and television towers
