= KAJM =

- Tempe, Arizona; United States
- Broadcast area: Phoenix metropolitan area
- Frequency: 1580 kHz
- Branding: Mega 99.3

Programming
- Language: English
- Format: Rhythmic oldies

Ownership
- Owner: Sierra H Broadcasting, Inc.; (LPFM Broadcasting, LLC)
- Sister stations: KZCE; KZNY

History
- First air date: June 1, 1960
- Former call signs: KYND (1960–1967); KTUF (1967–1973); KNIX (1973–1990); KCWW (1990–1998); KMIK (1998–2015); KHEP (2015–2017); KQFN (2017–2026)
- Call sign meaning: Arizona Jamz, from former brand at 104.3 MHz

Technical information
- Licensing authority: FCC
- Facility ID: 7701
- Class: B
- Power: 24,000 watts (day); 245 watts (night)
- Transmitter coordinates: 33°23′21″N 111°59′56″W
- Translators: 95.9 K240EU (Tempe); 99.3 K257CD (Phoenix)

Links
- Public license information: Public file; LMS
- Webcast: Listen live
- Website: mega993az.com

KAJM (1580 AM) is a commercial radio station licensed to Tempe, Arizona, United States, serving the Phoenix metropolitan area. It is owned by LPFM Broadcasting, which is a sister company of Sierra H Multimedia, and airs a rhythmic oldies format known as Mega 99.3. It broadcasts from studios on Central Avenue in Phoenix and a transmitter near 40th Street and Southern Avenue in south Phoenix. The FM translator station K257CD on Shaw Butte provides FM coverage of KAJM in areas of Central and North Phoenix north of the Salt River.

This station began broadcasting from Tempe on June 1, 1960, as KYND, owned by Dick Gilbert. It was a daytime-only station with a middle-of-the-road music format. For more than 30 years, it was owned by Buck Owens and broadcast various forms of country music. In 1969, the country format was extended to FM on KNIX (102.5 FM). From 1973 to 1985, the station aired a more traditional-oriented version of KNIX's country format before becoming a full-time simulcast. From 1990 to 1998, the station was KCWW "KCW" and the flagship of Owens's satellite syndicated format "Real Country".

Owens sold KCWW to ABC/Disney in 1998, and for the next 15 years, the station as KMIK broadcast Radio Disney, a national children's contemporary hit format. As Disney dismantled the network, KMIK left the air owing to damage to its six-tower transmission array in Mesa. The station relocated to its current transmitter site at reduced power and returned to the air in 2017 as KQFN "The Fanatic", a sports talk station owned by CRC Broadcasting and simulcast on K257CD and an additional translator, K240EU, in the East Valley. CRC was placed into receivership in 2025 and the facility sold to Sierra H Broadcasting, owner of K257CD.

AM 1580 is a Canadian clear-channel frequency, on which CKDO in Oshawa, Ontario, is the dominant Class A station. There are no other Class A stations on this frequency in North America.

== History ==
=== KYND ===
The station first began broadcasting on June 1, 1960, with the call sign KYND. The station's license was assigned by the FCC on July 25, 1960. KYND was originally owned by Dick Gilbert, a singer, music editor, and disc jockey. During the period the station was KYND, it broadcast middle of the road music, and was branded as "The Kind Station".

The station originally broadcast only during daytime hours, with a power of 10,000 watts. In the mid-1960s the station's power was increased 50,000 watts during the day, with a power of 10,000 watts during critical hours. In 1966, the station's owner, Dick Gilbert sold the station to Rene Cote for $341,250, which included $148,250 for station equipment and a noncompetition agreement, and $193,000 for a 10-year consultation contract.

=== Buck Owens era ===
==== KTUF ====
In 1967, the station was purchased by Buck Owens for $350,000. Owens had the station's call sign changed to KTUF, and switched its format to country music, a field where Owens was a noted singer. In April 1969, KTUF's programming began to be simulcast on 102.5 KNIX-FM during daytime hours when KTUF was on the air, with KNIX-FM continuing the format at night. KNIX-FM had been purchased by Buck Owens the previous year.

During the period the station was KTUF, the station was branded as "All American Radio" and "All American Country Radio".

==== KNIX ====
In 1973, the station's call sign was changed to KNIX, matching the call letters of its FM sister station. In 1980, KNIX began broadcasting 24 hours a day. From 1973 to 1985, the station aired a more traditional country sound, while sometimes simulcasting the FM station. In October 1984, the station began broadcasting in AM stereo using the Motorola C-QUAM system. In 1985, the station began a fulltime simulcast of KNIX-FM.

==== KCWW ====
On January 1, 1990, the station became an affiliate of Satellite Music Network's "Real Country" format and the call sign was changed to KCWW. While its full call sign was given during station identifications, the station's primary branding and over the air identification was "KCW" with the CW standing for "Country & Western". During this period, KCWW served as the flagship station of the "Real Country" network, which station owner Buck Owens was co-owner of at the time.

In July 1998, longtime station owner Buck Owens sold the station to ABC/Disney for $8,850,000. KCWW continued to air the "Real Country" country music format until its sale, when it flipped to Radio Disney on July 27.

=== Radio Disney era ===
After the station's purchase by ABC/Disney, the station became an affiliate of the children's/contemporary hit radio network Radio Disney. On December 4, the call sign was changed to KMIK, with the MIK standing for the Disney cartoon character "Mickey Mouse". On August 13, 2014, Disney put KMIK and twenty-two other Radio Disney stations up for sale, in order to focus on digital distribution of the Radio Disney network. Radio Disney programming later returned to the Phoenix media market on the KOOL-FM 94.5-HD3 digital subchannel in May 2016, but as a result of Entercom dropping their Radio Disney digital subchannels in June 2018, the subchannel was discontinued.

=== Gabrielle Broadcasting/CRC ownership ===
On August 16, 2015, ABC agreed to sell KMIK to Gabrielle Broadcasting Licensee for $1.4 million. Gabrielle is owned by Jacob J. Barker, the general manager of KXEG 1280. Gabrielle Broadcasting planned to carry a "locally focused spoken word format". KMIK would also change its call sign to KHEP. Gabrielle consummated the purchase on October 20, 2015.

At 12:01 am on October 14, midway through "Drag Me Down" by One Direction, KMIK signed off the air to allow for a transmitter relocation. While off the air, Gabrielle Broadcasting asked the FCC to change its call sign to KHEP, which were the longtime call sign of 1280 from 1956 until 1999. AM 1280 is now known as KXEG. Gabrielle began work on downgrading 1580 from a Class B to a Class D station, along with a tower relocation and a major nighttime power decrease from 50,000 watts directional to 95 watts non-directional, diplexed with KXEG west of central Phoenix. In November 2016, it was announced that KHEP was sold by Gabrielle Broadcasting to CRC Broadcasting Company, Inc., owners of business news KFNN, with the sale closing on May 1, 2017, at a price of $450,000. CRC owner Ron Cohen tapped Mike Muraco, who had been hosting a brokered sports talk show on crosstown KDUS (which he would later return to on a brokered-time basis in 2019) to develop a brand new sports station. On February 14, KQFN filed an application for a Federal Communications Commission construction permit to increase night power to 700 watts. The application was accepted for filing on February 17.

The station returned to the air on February 13, under a local marketing agreement with CRC, airing an all-sports format. On March 16, following the closing of the station's sale to CRC, KHEP changed its call sign to KQFN. CRC's stations were transferred to a liquidation agent in 2025 for the benefit of Desert Financial Credit Union, a major creditor of CRC.

=== Sierra H ===
After the liquidation, KQFN was taken silent. It was acquired in May 2026 by LPFM Broadcasting, a sister to Sierra H Broadcasting for $150,000, with a time brokerage agreement permitting the station to be programmed ahead of closing. LPFM Broadcasting also owned K257CD, a translator that had previously broadcast KQFN and had since switched to the HD3 subchannel of KMLE to air the Mega format previously on KAJM (104.3 FM). (Note: K257CD is one of Phoenix's oldest translators, having rebroadcast a number of different stations since going on air in 1984. It initially provided a simulcast of KSTM in Apache Junction, but by the mid-90s it was dependent on KRIM, which itself was one of several transmitters for KBZR/KPTY. After a stint simulcasting KNRJ, it served as a translator for KFNN prior to being transitioned to KQFN; at that time, KFNN built a new translator on 105.3 MHz.) The call sign of the 1580 facility was changed to KAJM on June 22, 2026.
