= KZCE =

Radio station in Cordes Lakes, Arizona

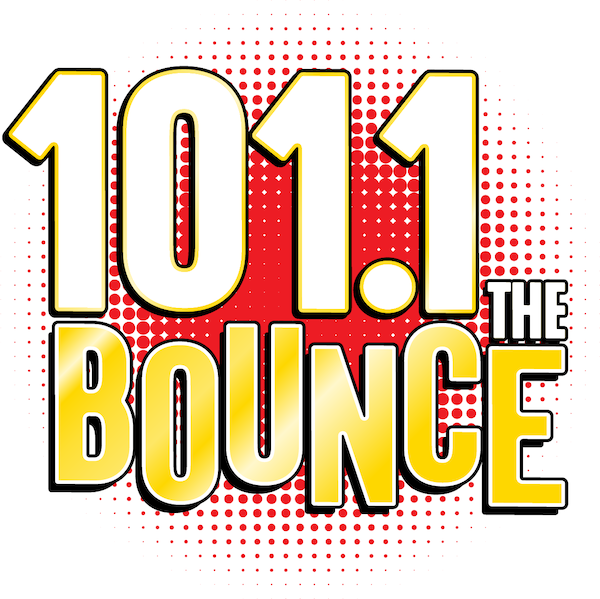
- Cordes Lakes, Arizona; United States
- Broadcast area: Phoenix metropolitan area
- Frequency: 101.1 MHz
- Branding: 101.1 The Bounce

Programming
- Format: Classic hip hop

Ownership
- Owner: Sierra H Multimedia
- Sister stations: KAJM, KZNY

History
- First air date: 1998 (as KESP)
- Former call signs: KESP (1997–2000); KAZL (2000–2002); KNRJ (2002–2021)
- Call sign meaning: Arizona Bounce

Technical information
- Licensing authority: FCC
- Facility ID: 55425
- Class: C
- ERP: 40,000 watts
- HAAT: 807 meters (2,648 ft)
- Transmitter coordinates: 34°13′47″N 112°21′3″W

Links
- Public license information: Public file; LMS
- Webcast: Listen Live
- Website: 101bounce.com

KZCE (101.1 MHz) is a commercial FM radio station licensed to Cordes Lakes, Arizona, which is 66 miles north of Phoenix. KZCE is owned by Sierra H Multimedia and broadcasts a classic hip hop radio format. Its radio studios are on Central Avenue in Midtown Phoenix.

KZCE has an effective radiated power (ERP) of 40,000 watts. The transmitter is off Tower Mountain Road in Crown King. It is considered a rim-shot FM station in the Phoenix radio market, since its tower is about 50 miles north of Phoenix.

== History ==
=== Loop 101 ===
The first attempt to put a station on the air on 101.1 in Payson failed. A group had a construction permit from the Federal Communications Commission (FCC) for KRMM. But it never got on the air and the construction permit lapsed. Another group applied for the frequency and was more successful.

In the late 1990s, KESP signed on from Payson as a classic hits station named "Loop 101", taking its name from the Phoenix-area freeway. In 2000, the call sign was changed to KAZL (K AriZona Loop), and K224CJ 92.7 FM from South Mountain and K292DF 106.3 FM (now K228XO 93.5 FM) in Flagstaff were applied for and signed on during the same period. The station's goal was to be an alternative to CBS-owned KOOL-FM, another classic hits station serving the Phoenix area. KAZL, K224CJ, and K292DF never achieved sufficient ratings.

=== All Commercials ===
The dismal ratings were followed by a format change at 5 pm on June 18, 2002: KAZL began stunting with all-commercials ("All Commercials, All the Time, KAZL"). Steven Szalay, operations manager, an established producer and stockholder in Sierra H Broadcasting, Inc, created an entire radio format complete with sweepers, liners, IDs and live DJ comments as well as a collection of classic radio commercials.

His "theory" was that since all the most popular stations played many commercials, a station that played commercials all the time would quickly shoot to the top. The station received many calls asking if this was serious; some called to express their appreciation of the joke, and some believed it pleading and demanding that the classic hits format be returned.

=== Energy 92.7 and 101.1 ===
Three days later, at 5 pm on June 21, 2002, KAZL switched to Dance Top 40, branded as "Energy 92-7 & 101-1". The first song on "Energy" was "The Launch" by DJ Jean. KNRJ was considered a clone of WKIE in Chicago; both were programmed and consulted by Chris Shebel until WKIE was sold and changed to a Spanish format in early 2003. KNRJ was also a reporter in Billboard Magazine's Dance/Mix Show Airplay panel.

Energy 92.7 & 101.1

KNRJ's dance music product included house, trance, and club music, as well as remixes of pop and R&B hits. The first personality to be live on-air was KEDJ's "Pistol Pete", who took the afternoon day part. Shortly thereafter, Lysa D. became evening host. In January 2004, Alex Santa Maria (at the time, PD of KNRJ's sister station, KAJM) took over the programming reins as well as becoming the voice of morning drive. The first mixshow to air on the station was a syndicated version of Paul Oakenfold's International BPM Sundays Nights. After months of promoting the station, evening personality Lysa D. launched live mixshows, including the Friday Night Funky Mix and GrooveSessionz, which aired weekend evenings. With the thought of expanding the station's reputation in the dance world, Lysa featured exclusive interviews and mixes from the likes of Bad Boy Bill and Richard Vission, as well as local talent, such as Rob Wegner, Kevin Brown and Pete Salas. In March 2003, Santa Maria brought in DJ Perry for mixing duties during the Rewind Lunch (which ran until early 2004), and then later recruited DJ Shy, who had a short-lived morning show. Around the same time, Greggy D and Randy became afternoon show hosts, with Pistol Pete moving to mornings.

In May 2004, programming authority had changed, as well as the station's playlist. "Mike O", program director of Internet radio station "Energy 98", took the crown as KNRJ's new program director and afternoon host (while letting go of Greggy D and Randy), and attempted to improve the station with his format he used on "Energy" (which was merged with KNRJ's while Energy 98's website redirected to KNRJ's website). Months later, Pistol Pete left for Los Angeles, and Lysa D. took over mornings with her show titled "The Morning Frenzy". More mixshows and some syndicated radio talent would be featured, including Richard Dalton, Joe Bermudez, DJ Perry (Middays), Victor Dinaire, Roger Sanchez, Justin Dohman, Rod Carrillo, and many more.

In summer 2005, Mike O was let go, and returned to programming "Energy 98". Rod Carrillo took over programming KNRJ, and Beau Duran (who previously worked weekends and evenings under Mike) took over afternoons. But a few months later, Rod Carrillo also gained control of KAJM and let go of his MD Lysa D (who was on both stations), in addition to Beau Duran, and the station became mostly jockless. The unhosted morning show was titled More Music Mornings, while the unhosted mid-day show was called More Music Mid-Days. However, that didn't help ratings, and it was later decided to bring back Pistol Pete as afternoon host.

On October 31, 2007, KNRJ began stunting, playing Wall of Voodoo's "Mexican Radio", Front 242's "Headhunter", and Ministry's "(Every Day Is) Halloween" along with commercials, the normal legal ID with voiceover Harry Legg saying "KNRJ Payson/Phoenix, 92.7 K224CJ Phoenix, 106.3 K292DF Flagstaff", and a white man speaking in Spanglish saying, "Friends, please excuse the music which you hear on 92.7 and 101.1. Tune in tomorrow at 10 o'clock in the morning for more information. Thank you." At 10 AM on November 1, 2007, KNRJ played the Mexican hat dance three times, and then KNRJ was relaunched with Beau Duran saying that "Energy is back, and new and improved". The changes that took place included the return of Beau Duran as MD/Mid-day host, Pistol Pete remaining in afternoons, recorded mix shows were added in overnights ("High Energy After Dark" featuring Carl Cox, Armin van Buuren, Markus Schulz, Spencer Thomas, Eddie Amador, Mickey "Mixin" Oliver (of "Chicago's Hot Mix 5"), and many others), the station playlist was completely revamped, and all new jingles were produced without long time Energy voice over veteran Harry Legg; instead, he was replaced by Mitch Craig, a similar-sounding person.

In April 2008, Rod Carrillo left to pursue his producing and touring career, and Beau Duran took over as program director for the remainder of the format. After a few months, the station still struggled in the ratings (mainly due to the constant musical and airstaff adjustments over the years, and the lack of support from management for over two years). Beau Duran was then forced to take the station in a different direction.

=== The Beat ===
"Energy" signed off at 5 p.m. on October 31, 2008, with Depeche Mode's "Enjoy The Silence" as the last song. Translator K257CD (99.3 FM) then began simulcasting KNRJ (as former simulcast partner KAJM now had adequate Phoenix area coverage on 104.3), and KNRJ launched a stunt format that started with a man saying "This is KNRJ Payson. If you're looking for Arizona's Old School, you need to hike it on over to Mega 104.3. The Valley will be in the Zone, Monday morning at 9:27 a.m.; right now though, I found this guy's iPod. Let's see what's on it." and then played U2's "Pride (In The Name Of Love)". KNRJ's stunt format included many different songs from different genres as well as an announcer announcing that a new format will be coming to the Valley. Each announcement mentioned a different radio station, some of which were legacy names (e.g. "Y" for KYOT, which used to be KOY-FM/"Y-95").

At exactly the promised time on November 3, 2008, KNRJ switched to old school hip hop as 92.7 & 99.3 The Beat, with the first song being Ice Cube's "You Know How We Do It". At first, they were the only known all old-school hip hop station on terrestrial radio up until KDAY in Los Angeles relaunched their old school hip hop format in August 2009. KNRJ primarily played old school hip hop from the 1980s and 1990s, and some hip hop songs from the early 2000s.

In 2011, Fred Rico was named the new program director of KNRJ. The music director was Ramses Ja. Since these changes have been made, newer hits had found their way onto KNRJ's playlist.

In March 2012, KNRJ completed its signal upgrade and changed its city-of-license to Cordes Lakes. When the old transmitter near Payson went silent, K228XO in Flagstaff, at the same time, stopped simulcasting KNRJ, and began simulcasting KAFF.

In May 2012, KNRJ stopped airing on K224CJ (92.7 FM), as they have now have enough coverage with 101.1. East Valley Institute of Technology's KVIT is using K224CJ to expand their coverage into the Phoenix Metropolitan Area. With this, the station rebranded as "99.3 & 101.1 The Beat".

In November 2012, K257CD (99.3 FM) went silent, and upon resuming broadcast in January 2013, it began simulcasting KFNN. With this, the station rebranded again, this time as "101.1 The Beat"'.

In May 2013, KNRJ was added to Mediabase's Rhythmic panel due to a shift to a current-based presentation, putting it in direct competition with both KZON and KKFR. Despite incorporating more current focused hits, the station overall retained a predominant classic hip hop direction.

By late 2017, KNRJ would complete its evolution to a current-based rhythmic, initially under the moniker of "Hip-Hop and Hits", and then "Arizona's Hip-Hop Station".

=== The Bounce ===
On January 20, 2021, KNRJ changed its call letters to KZCE.

On March 31, 2021, the station dropped the "Beat" format and began stunting with a loop of songs by Notorious B.I.G and Dr. Dre, alternating artists each song, with sweepers stating “What the hell is happening at 101.1?” and “Something big is coming” with a new format launch set for 4 p.m. on April 1. With new station manager John Candelaria joining the station and the recent callsign change, it was theorized by radio industry website RadioInsight that the station would flip back to classic hip hop at that time, possibly with the branding "The Bounce", as Candelaria had experience and success with the format while heading the similarly named WMGC-FM in Detroit. At 3:48 p.m., the stunt shifted to a looped sound of a heartbeat. At 4 p.m., the station returned to classic hip hop as "101.1 The Bounce." The first song under the new brand was "Party Up (Up in Here)" by DMX.
