= KZNY =

Radio station in Camp Verde, Arizona

Coordinates: 34.22975°N 112.351528°W

- Camp Verde, Arizona; United States
- Broadcast area: Phoenix, Arizona
- Frequency: 104.3 MHz
- Branding: Sunny 104.3

Programming
- Format: Soft adult contemporary
- Affiliations: Compass Media Networks

Ownership
- Owner: Sierra H Multimedia
- Sister stations: KAJM, KZCE

History
- First air date: 1984 (as KKJJ)
- Former call signs: KKJJ (1984–1987); KAFM (1987–1988); KRIM (1988–1998); KBZG (1998–1999); KAJM (1999–2026); KAJM-FM (June 2026)
- Former frequencies: 103.9 MHz (1984–1987)
- Call sign meaning: From "Sunny"

Technical information
- Licensing authority: FCC
- Facility ID: 52818
- Class: C
- ERP: 40,000 watts
- HAAT: 807 meters (2,648 feet)

Links
- Public license information: Public file; LMS
- Webcast: Listen live
- Website: sunny1043az.com

KZNY (104.3 FM) is a commercial radio station in Camp Verde, Arizona, broadcasting to Phoenix, Arizona. Owned by locally based Sierra H Multimedia, its studios are located on Central Avenue in Midtown Phoenix, and its transmitter is in Crown King.

== History ==
The station began in the summer of 1984 as KKJJ 103.9, a Class A station licensed to Payson, and would remain until 1987, when they got the approval and completed the move to 104.3. The original format was country.

Callsigns since then included first KAFM then KRIM then KBZG which were in use during part of the KBZR simulcast. The KRIM calls sign would later return to Payson on KRIM-LP.

Previous formats include country, an AOR/modern rock/CHR format called "The Blaze", a simulcast of rhythmic CHR KBZR-Coolidge (later KPTY-Gilbert), a return of the "Blaze" format (under the new name "CD Rock"), oldies as "K-Best", and a 1960s-1990s rhythmic oldies format, under the name "Arizona Jamz", featuring sweepers with Beavis and Butt-Head sound bytes.

Carey Edwards, an established Phoenix air talent who had most recently been programming rhythmic oldies KGMG "Mega 106.3" in Tucson, was brought to the station. Soon after his arrival, allaccess.com reported that KAJM would be "relaunched" soon. On April 20, 2001, at 5:00 pm, as Edwards applied the formula from KGMG — KAJM became "Mega 104.3 & 99.3". Since then, the station has shifted towards a gold-based urban adult contemporary direction in part due to having a sister station in KNRJ, whose playlist and direction features an urban contemporary direction with a heavy emphasis on classic hip hop.

In June 2007, KAJM moved its signal at 104.3 MHz from a location north of Payson, to Wildflower Mountain near Crown King, and changed its city of license to Camp Verde. Despite a power reduction, this location gives the station better coverage in the Phoenix metropolitan area, mainly in the western suburbs. The 99.3 translator would become part of KNRJ.

As of June 2011, KAJM has picked up competition from gold-based rhythmic adult contemporary station KYOT-FM, a move that prompted KAJM to rechristen its slogan to "Arizona's #1 Old School Station" to counter KYOT-FM's library of R&B/pop/dance classics (KYOT-FM has since flipped to adult hits).

In July 2022, the station revived the "Jamz" moniker it had used before rebranding to "Mega", and began to be alternatively branded as "Mega 104.3 Jamz", with no change made to its format.

On February 5, 2026, KAJM began simulcasting on translator K257CD 99.3 FM and the HD3 subchannel of KMLE; the new signal originates from North Mountain, Phoenix, giving it better reception in Phoenix than the existing rimshot signal. On February 26, the Mega format moved exclusively to K257CD/KMLE-HD3, and the station began stunting with a looping announcement promoting the frequency change, and that a new format would launch on KAJM at 3 p.m. At that time, the station flipped to soft adult contemporary as Sunny 104.3. The call sign was changed to KZNY on June 22, 2026.
