= KALV-FM =

Contemporary hit radio station in Phoenix

- Phoenix, Arizona; United States
- Broadcast area: Phoenix metropolitan area
- Frequency: 101.5 MHz (HD Radio)
- Branding: Live 101-5

Programming
- Language: English
- Format: Contemporary hit radio
- Subchannels: HD2: Channel Q; HD3: Community radio "Z89.3 KZAO"

Ownership
- Owner: Audacy, Inc.; (Audacy License, LLC)
- Sister stations: KMLE; KOOL-FM

History
- First air date: July 5, 1964
- Former call signs: KHEP-FM (1964–1985); KONC (1985–1986); KAMJ-FM (1986–1990); KMXX (1990–1992); KZON (1992–2016)
- Call sign meaning: Arizona's Live Station

Technical information
- Licensing authority: FCC
- Facility ID: 63913
- Class: C
- ERP: 100,000 watts
- HAAT: 530 meters (1,740 ft)
- Transmitter coordinates: 33.331°N 112.063°W

Links
- Public license information: Public file; LMS
- Webcast: Listen live (via Audacy); HD3: Listen live
- Website: www.audacy.com/live1015phoenix

KALV-FM (101.5 FM, "Live 101-5") is a commercial radio station licensed to Phoenix, Arizona, United States. It is owned by Audacy, Inc. and it airs a contemporary hit radio format. KALV-FM's studios are located in downtown Phoenix, and its transmitter is in South Mountain Park.

== History ==
=== Early years ===
On July 5, 1964, the station signed on the air as KHEP-FM and aired a classical music format. It was owned by Grand Canyon Broadcasting, along with religious station KHEP (1280 AM). In 1973, KHEP-FM moved from the AM radio tower to a new facility on South Mountain, increasing its effective radiated power from 26 to 100 kilowatts. In 1985, KHEP-FM was sold to the owners of the Boston Globe and took the call sign KONC ("Concert 101"). On March 31, 1986, the station abandoned classical music for satellite-delivered soft rock as KAMJ ("Magic 101"), using the Transtar Radio Networks' 'Format 41' service, with a local morning show anchored by Mike Del Rosso.

By 1989, EZ Communications had taken the station completely live and local with a hot adult contemporary format as "The All New Magic 101". On May 7, 1990, it moved to a mainstream adult contemporary format as KMXX ("Mix 101").

=== The Zone (1992–2005) ===
After being sold to Sundance Broadcasting in 1992, the station would switch to AAA under the callsign KZON ("The Zone") on July 31. The "Zone" moniker would carry throughout its incarnations of modern rock, modern AC, Adult Top 40 and back to modern rock in 2000. In 2002, KZON began airing The Howard Stern Show, a nationally syndicated talk show, until its move away from terrestrial radio to Sirius satellite radio (later SiriusXM) in January 2006.

=== Free FM (2005–2007) ===
To replace the Stern show, it was announced on December 23, 2005, that KZON would adopt CBS Radio's Free FM format, featuring mostly nationally syndicated hot talk shows including The Adam Carolla Show, Frosty, Heidi & Frank, The Tom Leykis Show and Phil Hendrie. On January 3, 2006, the station switched from a focus on modern rock to the male-targeted talk format, with rock music played during overnights and weekends. During its brief run, it attempted to appeal toward young adult men, as CBS Radio had high hopes that this format would do well in Phoenix, using a promotional campaign that came along with it. On January 3, 2007, KZON reduced the music content and began to add more talk shows to the weekend lineup, and a taped Tom Leykis episode airing overnights, all in an attempt to attract more listeners.

=== Jamz (2007–2013) ===
Despite some ratings growth, the hot talk format proved to be a failure in the market, especially when KTAR moved its talk radio format to KTAR-FM in January 2007. Rumors of a format change came true at 5 p.m. on June 21, 2007, when the station's broadcast of the Tom Leykis Show was "hijacked" by station intern 'Renaldo', who began playing all-Paris Hilton music, while starting a petition on its website to free Hilton, who was serving a brief prison sentence at the time. At 5 p.m. the next day, KZON flipped to rhythmic CHR as "101-5 Jamz, Blazin' the Valley's Hits & Hip-Hop". The first song played on "Jamz" was "Party Like a Rockstar" by the Shop Boyz.

KZON was the fourth station to drop the Free FM format, following sister station KSCF in San Diego, California, which flipped to modern AC, sister station and former Free FM flagship WFNY-FM in New York City, which returned to Active rock and its original call letters and moniker WXRK (K-Rock 92.3), and sister station KIFR in San Francisco, which picked up the KFRC-FM call letters and a classic hits format. As with many format changes in radio, there was a backlash from fans of Free FM who wanted to see the station and its personalities return. The former Free FM website was linked to the stream of sister station KLSX "97.1 Free FM" in Los Angeles, where Carolla and Leykis originated until 2009, when KLSX dropped the format for Top 40.

In regarding KZON's flip to rhythmic, the station began attacking KKFR, saying that the "Power" has been turned off (in reference to KKFR's frequency switch from 92.3 to 98.3) and "Where Hip Hop USED to live." KZON also boasted on air to playing "100,000 watts of 'Static-Free' Hip-Hop" and borrowed Apple's "Mac vs. PC" ad campaign in which KZON billed itself as the "Mac" to KKFR's "PC". In addition, the station also attempted to take on Top 40 rival KZZP, the former rhythmic AC (later top 40) station KMVA, and (as of 2013) former old school hip-hop turned Rhythmic KNRJ. In response to KZON's debut and full-powered signal range, KKFR's then-programming director Bruce St. James stated he was not worried, telling the Arizona Republic, "What are they going to do? Play more hip-hop than us? Really, I think we'll be OK." St. James would end up joining KZON as its new PD in January 2010, but after almost three months on the job, he resigned on March 30, 2010, to pursue other opportunities. In November 2008, KZON switched its slogan to "The Valley's #1 Hit Music Station", a slogan that KKFR would also adopt the following December, giving the Phoenix area two radio stations with the same format and slogan. Since then, KKFR has dropped that slogan.

As of 2010, KZON has expanded its focus to include dance and pop tracks, overtaking KZZP and KKFR in the Arbitron ratings.

=== Live 101-5 (2013–present) ===
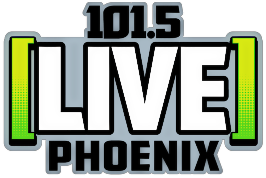
Previous logo

In 2013, KZON dropped the "Jamz" portion of its moniker and branded itself as just "101.5". On September 6, the station rebranded as "Live 101-5", and shifted its playlist to more mainstream material, but would later scale back on pop/rock product and focus more on rhythmic pop/dance hits. KZON reports to Mediabase as a Top 40/CHR reporter, but continued to report to BDS as a Rhythmic reporter until March 2015, putting the station in line with CBS Radio's Top 40/CHR presentation, which emphasized current rhythmic pop and dance product, along with daily and weekend mix shows that continued after the rebranding.

The station changed its call sign to KALV-FM on June 1, 2016.

On February 2, 2017, CBS Radio announced it would merge with Entercom (now Audacy, Inc.). The merger was approved on November 9, 2017, and was consummated on November 17.
