= KVIB =

KVIB may refer to:

- KVIB-LP, a low-power radio station (101.1 FM) licensed to serve San Diego, California, United States
- KZON, a radio station (95.1 FM) licensed to serve Sun City West, Arizona, United States, which held the call sign KVIB from 2005 to 2014
- KVIB, the Kolkata Metro station code for VIP Bazar metro station, West Bengal, India
