= KPXQ =

Christian radio station in Glendale, Arizona, United States

- Glendale, Arizona; United States
- Broadcast area: Phoenix metropolitan area
- Frequency: 1360 kHz
- Branding: FaithTalk 1360

Programming
- Format: Christian radio
- Affiliations: SRN News; USA Radio Network

Ownership
- Owner: Salem Media Group; (Salem Communications Holding Corporation)
- Sister stations: KKNT, KXXT

History
- First air date: 1947
- Former call signs: KRUX (1947–1981); KLFF (1981–1992); KNNS (1992–1994); KGME (1994–1999); KFDJ (1999–1999); KCTK (1999)
- Former frequencies: 1340 kHz (1947–1957)

Technical information
- Licensing authority: FCC
- Facility ID: 55912
- Class: B
- Power: 50,000 watts (day); 1,000 watts (night)
- Transmitter coordinates: 33°30′28.00″N 112°13′1.00″W

Links
- Public license information: Public file; LMS
- Webcast: Listen live
- Website: faithtalk1360.com

KPXQ (1360 AM) is a commercial radio station licensed to Glendale, Arizona, United States, and serving the Phoenix metropolitan area. Owned by Salem Media Group, it airs a Christian radio format with studios on East Camelback Road in Phoenix. KPXQ's transmitter is also sited on Camelback Road, but at a different location near North 73rd Avenue.

== History ==
=== Early years ===
KPXQ signed on in 1947. The original call sign was KRUX and it was owned by Gene Burke Brophy. The studios were in the historic Hotel Westward Ho.

At first, the station broadcast on 1340 kHz. KRUX moved to 1360 in 1957 after being denied a frequency change to 910 kHz ten years prior.

=== Top 40 era ===
From the late 1950s until the 1970s, KRUX was a major Top 40 station in Phoenix. During its heyday, it competed head to head with KRIZ 1230 AM for Top 40 radio dominance in Phoenix. KRUX and KRIZ went back and forth in the ratings game before both stations succumbed to the more popular FM stations by the late 1970s.

On January 20, 1967, Monkees Davy Jones, Micky Dolenz and Mike Nesmith "took over" the KRUX studios (Peter Tork was ill that day), in order to promote their concert at the Arizona Veterans Memorial Coliseum the next day. Portions of this broadcast were used in the first season finale episode, "Monkees On Tour".

Program Directors during the station's heyday included Larry "Lucky Lawrence" Wright and Al McCoy, who went on to become the long-time play-by-play voice of the NBA Phoenix Suns.

Some of the station's all time ratings getters were the personalities of the 1960s, known as the "KRUX Good Guys": Lucky Lawrence, "Bobby-Poo" Bob Shannon (later heard on WCBS-FM, "Your Boy" Al McCoy, Charles L. "Kit" Carson, Norm Seeley, Dick Gray, Dennis Wilkerson, "Mighty" Ed Mitchell and Don Daro overnights. The jocks of the 1970s were John Driscoll aka the 2nd Bob Shannon, John Sebastian, Dave Trout, Chuck Browning, Harry Scarborough, Rhett Walker and Rich "Mother" Robbins.

=== Format changes after Top 40 ===
For a brief period in the mid-1970s, KRUX experimented with an all-news format featuring NBC's short-lived "News and Information Service" (NIS Network). When that experiment failed, the station went back to an Adult Top 40 format, with Richard Ruiz of Downey, California, as program director. Ruiz pre-dated the switch to all-news in 1975.

With the insurgence of FM competition, it was difficult for an AM music station to compete for listeners. KRUX's owner, the Lotus Corporation, brought in several radio vets from other stations to try to help KRUX. Those radio personalities included "KC in the Morning" Kennedy from 5 AM to 10AM, Daniel (Oshe) from 10AM to 3 PM, Program Director Bobby Rivers 3PM to 7PM. They were heard on KRUX from the late seventies till January 1981. Other DJ's included Greg Mills from 7PM - midnight and Morgan Evans from midnight to 6am. Evans later moved to morning drive at Anchorage, Alaska AOR rocker KRKN. CW MCMUffin on Weekends doubled also as the engineer for over five years.

In 1981, KRUX became KLFF with the "Music of Your Life" format of adult standards. Then in 1992, KRUX tried another attempt at all-news radio, featuring the CNN Headline News audio feed. The call letters switched to KNNS. After two years, the station switched to sports radio as KGME, now at 910 AM. The Howard Stern Show was heard on KGME and KHOT-FM early in 1995. In 1998, KGME upgraded its power from 5000 to 50,000 watts daytime, while remaining at 1,000 watts at night.

In April 1999, AM/FM Broadcasting purchased the call letters, studio, and programming of KGME, moving them to 550 kHz. In turn, co-owned KOY, which was the first radio station in Arizona and had been on 550 since 1941, moved to 1230 where it remains to this day. KGME and news/talk sister-station KFYI swapped frequencies in 2000, with sports on 910 and news/talk on 550.

=== Sale to Salem Media ===
New Planet Radio kept the 1360 transmitter, changing the call letters to KFDJ, and began simulcasting co-owned KEDJ 106.3 until the AM station was sold to Salem.

Salem purchased the station in 1999, with intentions of creating a new conservative talk station in Phoenix to pair with its Christian Talk and Teaching format at 960 AM (which was then called "Q96"). Instead, Salem moved the religious programming to 1360 AM. That allowed AM 960 to become the home for secular conservative talk.

Former logo
