= KRPH (disambiguation) =

KRPH is a radio station in Arizona.

KRPH may also refer to:

- Kalamazoo Regional Psychiatric Hospital
- KRPH, ICAO code for Graham Municipal Airport in Texas
