= KKFR =

Radio station in Mayer, Arizona, United States

Coordinates: 34.234°N 112.368°W

- Mayer, Arizona; United States
- Broadcast area: Phoenix metropolitan area
- Frequency: 98.3 MHz
- Branding: Power 98.3

Programming
- Format: Rhythmic contemporary
- Affiliations: Premiere Networks, United Stations Radio Networks

Ownership
- Owner: Zelus Media Group; (Zelus Esports, LLC)
- Sister stations: KMVA, KZON

History
- First air date: January 1996
- Former call signs: KDTK (1992–1996); KKLD (1996–2006); KZGL (2006)
- Former frequencies: 92.3 MHz (1985–2006)
- Call sign meaning: "Fire": at 92.3, KKFR was once known as 92 Fire FM"

Technical information
- Licensing authority: FCC
- Facility ID: 41462
- Class: C
- ERP: 41,000 watts
- HAAT: 852 meters (2,795 ft)

Links
- Public license information: Public file; LMS
- Webcast: Listen Live
- Website: power983.com

KKFR (98.3 FM) is a commercial radio station that is licensed to Mayer, Arizona, and serves the Phoenix metropolitan area. The station is owned and operated by Zelus Media Group and airs a rhythmic radio format. KKFR broadcasts with an effective radiated power of 41 kW. The station's studios are located on 7th Street in Midtown Phoenix and its transmitter is located in Crown King, Arizona, producing a rimshot signal from 50 miles (80 km) northwest of Phoenix. KKFR is the flagship station of the nationally syndicated program Big Boy's Neighborhood.

KKFR primarily competes against mainstream top 40 stations KZZP and KALV-FM, and classic hip hop station KZCE. This marks the first time in many years that "Power" had significant competition with rival stations in the market.

== History ==
=== 92.3 FM ===
On December 19, 1970, the station at 92.3 FM first signed on with the call sign KXTC, and aired a mix of mainstream and contemporary jazz music. In 1978, the station switched to a disco format which lasted two years, using the name "Disco 92". Show hosts included Scott Tuchman and Rick Nuhn. In 1980 KXTC began playing "cross-country" as KC92. The music was a combination of country and pop with songs by Christopher Cross, the Eagles as well as Merle Haggard and Dolly Parton. John Wesley Gibson did the morning show, Dennis McBroom middays and program director Eric Fox afternoons. The station never found an audience, In 1982, the station changed its call letters to KEZC and flipped to country music with the branding "Easy Country". In 1984, KEZC began simulcasting KJJJ (now KGME) as KJJJ-FM, a more mainstream country station.

In 1985, KJJJ-FM flipped to a gold-based top 40 format known as "The Fire Station, Arizona's 92 Fire FM" with new KKFR call letters. KKFR began shifting towards a more rhythmic/dance direction in the late 1980s. The station also adopted the "Power 92" moniker in 1988 and patterned its direction on KPWR in Los Angeles. KKFR adjusted its branding to "Power 92.3" in 2000. TV personality Danny Bonaduce worked at KKFR for a few months in 1989 and 1990 as a morning program co-host.

On December 16, 1993, despite high ratings with its rhythmic-leaning direction, KKFR evolved to a mainstream top 40 and leaned slightly toward modern rock (to less of an extent than other Top 40 stations in other markets). The station's ratings slipped as a result. From January to March 1995, the station re-added rhythmic and dance music tracks to the playlist, and began regaining much of its lost audience. However, the dance songs began to be removed by 1997, leading the transformation towards a R&B/hip hop approach. By the end of the year, the station was no longer a mainstream top 40 outlet.

Chancellor Media (which later became AMFM, Inc.) purchased KKFR in late 1998 from its longtime owners The Broadcast Group, but when the company merged with Clear Channel Communications, they had to divest the station to meet FCC ownership regulations. Emmis Communications became its owner in 2000. Beginning in 2005, Power started adding more rhythmic pop tracks into the playlist.

=== Move to 98.3 FM ===
On May 8, 2006, Emmis sold KKFR to Bonneville International, which, in turn, announced that KKFR would become the news station for the market as KTAR-FM; KTAR (620 AM) would absorb the sports assets of KMVP. On July 12, Emmis sold the KKFR intellectual property to Riviera Broadcast Group, which already owned KEDJ, for use on another radio station. That station was KKLD (98.3 FM); originally licensed to Prescott Valley, it changed its city of license to Mayer and adopted the KKFR call letters on September 1, 2006.

On June 22, 2007, KKFR picked up an unlikely competitor when KZON dropped its talk radio format for rhythmic contemporary as "101.5 JAMZ". When KZON made the flip, it aired attack liners towards KKFR such as "The Power's Out", "Where Hip-Hop USED to live", and "100,000 watts of 'Static-Free' Jamz!" However, in a statement made to The Arizona Republic, KKFR's then-program director Bruce St. James, who joined KZON as its new PD in January 2010, said, "What are they going to do? Play more Hip Hop than us? Really, I think we'll be ok."

On December 1, 2008, KKFR dropped its slogan "Where Hip Hop Lives" in favor of "The Valley's #1 Hit Music Station" but retained its rhythmic direction. Ironically, KZON adopted the latter slogan in November, a month before KKFR changed theirs. This move gave Phoenix two radio stations with the same format and slogan; KKFR decided to drop the slogan after nearly a year. A similar scenario occurred between rivaling top 40 stations KZZP and KMVA.

Logo for KKFR under previous simulcast with 101.9 translator, used from December 2015 to March 2017.

Logo for KKFR used from March 2017 to July 2023.

On December 4, 2015, KKFR rebranded as "Power 98.3 & 101.9" after adding a simulcast on translator K270BZ (101.9 FM) in Phoenix. This changed to "Power 98.3 & 96.1" on March 6, 2017, when the station began simulcasting on translator K241BQ (96.1 FM) in Fort McDowell and shut down K270BZ.

On September 1, 2023, KKFR began playing frequent Drake music, and rebranded as “Drake 98.3 & 96.1” to coincide with the It's All a Blur Tour with no other notable changes. KKFR returned to the “Power” branding on September 7.

On April 28, 2024, KKFR began stunting, running a random assortment of departure-themed songs and promoting a "new sound" to debut at Noon the following day. At the promised time, the station relaunched with a rhythmic hot AC format, shifting the already rhythmic-based format to include more R&B and classic hip hop music, while retaining the “Power” branding; the first song under the relaunched format was "Return of the Mack" by Mark Morrison.
