= KEGY =

KEGY may refer to:

- KWFN, a radio station (97.3 FM) licensed to serve San Diego, California, United States, which held the call sign KEGY from 2017 to 2018
- KSON (FM), a radio station (103.7 FM) licensed to serve San Diego, California, which held the call sign KEGY from 2012 to 2017
