= Call screener =

Job in broadcasting

A call screener or phone screener is a staff member who first answers the phone when audience members call into TV or radio broadcasts.

For call-in talk shows, screeners determine the air quality of the call (good connection or not) and if the caller's comments will further the topic or add a new point. Their job is to put the best calls on the air and filter out the callers that don't have anything worthwhile to add to the conversation. They also try to engage callers by acting as a "warm up" act for the host. Call screeners also typically provide a summary of pertinent information for the host or hosts to provide context for on air interaction, such as the caller's name, age, gender, location and a precis of what they intend to talk about.

During breaking news events, screeners are responsible for verifying the caller's identity, to ensure that correct information will be presented to the news anchor. A failure here can allow an embarrassing on-air prank call through. Richard Roeper blamed call screeners in 2003 for a phone prankster getting through to Dan Rather live on-air during the Space Shuttle Columbia disaster, by not checking the area code of the caller, who claimed to be an eyewitness in Texas. A New York Post article about phone pranksters describes call screeners as "overburdened and generally young producers assigned to act as gate-keepers", whose tools include "simply to ask would-be callers for their phone number and make sure the area code matches up with where they say they're calling from." An ABC News spokeswoman stated, "With breaking news we make every effort to ensure the credibility of the witness before we put them on the air, but in live events, screening processes are not 100 percent effective." An "industry vet" stated, "At the very least you can catch 90 percent of them by getting their number and calling them back, generally they freak or give you a phony phone number." Other techniques described "include grilling the caller on little known facts about the situation or organization they claim to represent."

== Notable call screeners ==
Although the names of most call screeners never make it on the air, there are a few notable screeners that are major characters on their shows.

- Joe Ardinger of the Don and Mike Show (said to be the oldest call screener in the world)
- Flipper of the Sean Hannity show (liberal screener on conservative talk show)
- Chunks of The Hideout (call screener and stunt guy)
- Lindsay Delong of Dick and Skibba (call screener, news person, rapper, female perspective on a show aimed at men)
- AP Mike of The Best Show with Tom Scharpling
- Jason Stewart (J-Stew) former "phone slap" of the Jim Rome Show.

== Notable talk shows that do not use a call screeners ==
Many live call-in radio shows do not like alternative or adverse opinions to be aired, going through great lengths to screen out such calls. Because of that, it is rare that a live call-in talk show does not use call screeners.

- The Love Doctors is a radio show broadcast in South Florida that has not used a call screener since its inception in 1989.
