= New Normal Music =

Programming
- Format: Indie Rock, Indie Pop

Ownership
- Owner: Tom Leykis

History
- First air date: July 1st, 2010 - July 12th, 2014

Technical information
- Class: Internet Radio Station

Links
- Website: New Normal Music

New Normal Music was an Internet radio station created by Tom Leykis and Art Webb that began streaming July 1, 2010. Leykis created New Normal Music in protest of radio stations who claim to play "new music" but only play safe market tested music often 10+ years old. "When Red Hot Chili Peppers release a new album, many radio stations refer to it as 'new music'. They were formed in 1983."

The station started off by playing 50,000 songs in a row - none more than 12 months old, mainly Indie Rock. Although songs were repeated and there were regular advertisements for the station itself. The station planned to sell advertising.

Some representative bands featured on the station included Arcade Fire, Fitz and the Tantrums, LCD Soundsystem, MGMT, Of Montreal and The Black Keys.

New Normal Music's DJs included Webb, former Sirius XMU DJ Tobi, former WFNX/Boston morning man Morning Guy Tai, and Zack Schulz.

The station was part of a greater network of podcasts and music streams Leykis started called The New Normal Network. Other 24-hour music streams from New Normal include New Normal Rock and CHR-formatted Pure Pop Hits.

New Normal Music ceased operations on July 12, 2014. Leykis posted on the site's facebook page "I wanted to thank the thousands of folks around the world who have listened to and spread the word about New Normal Music for four great years. Our program director and co-creator has moved on and without his specific music expertise, it's impossible to continue the format."
