= KCDX =

Radio station in Florence, Arizona

- Florence, Arizona; United States
- Frequency: 103.1 MHz

Programming
- Format: Classic rock

Ownership
- Owner: Ted Tucker; (Desert West Air Ranchers Corporation)

History
- First air date: May 24, 1993

Technical information
- Licensing authority: FCC
- Facility ID: 16764
- Class: C
- ERP: 42,000 watts
- HAAT: 614 meters (2,014 ft)
- Transmitter coordinates: 32°46′44.00″N 110°57′46.00″W

Links
- Public license information: Public file; LMS
- Webcast: Listen Live
- Website: kcdx.com

KCDX (103.1 FM) is a radio station broadcasting from Globe, Arizona to the east of Phoenix since March 2002 with a commercial-free rock music format. The station is licensed to Florence, Arizona. The KCDX listening area is primarily the eastern half of the Phoenix metropolitan region. The KCDX signal can also be picked up in the northern suburbs of Tucson.

== Format ==
The station format is late–1960s to late–1980s album rock. It is fully automated, has no DJs and does not play any commercial announcements other than its own station identification and local political ads as required by Federal Election Commission rules.

== History ==
KCDX was powered-on by Ted Tucker, a former hospital pharmacist and broadcast-radio engineer, who owns several radio stations in Arizona. He used the signal as a 2.7-kW personal MP3 player, broadcasting to central and eastern Arizona.

The station now has a website with a live Internet feed and a rolling playlist. The station's website has advertising.

On 08/10/2000, Tucker filed a Minor Change to a Licensed Facility Application with the FCC to move the main transmitter to a mountain NW of Oracle, AZ. while increasing power to 95 kW. Three engineering amendments were filed in 2003 and 2004. If approved, the signal upgrade would include new areas of Mesa, Apache Junction and N Tucson in the coverage area. Source: FCC Engineering ('FMQ') Database.

Tucker has remained quiet about the ultimate fate of the station, and seems to have a history of "flipping" properties, so it has been suggested that he may simply be creating value to promote its sale. The growth of KCDX's popularity induced him to duplicate the signal on the 36-kilowatt transmitter of 95.1 KFMR northwest of Phoenix in order to maintain its broadcast license while a sale of that station was pending. The KFMR simulcast lasted from October 2004 until March 2005, when KFMR's license was passed from Tucker to its new owners.

== See also ==
- List of radio stations in Arizona
