= Tom Leykis =

American talk radio personality

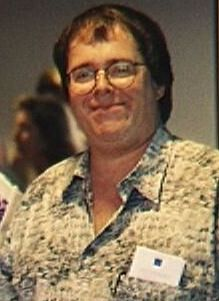
- Leykis in 1998
- Born: 1956 or 1957 (age 69–70); New York City, U.S.
- Occupation: Radio personality
- Years active: 1970–2024
- Known for: The Tom Leykis Show
- Website: blowmeuptom.com

Tom Leykis (pronounced: /ˈlaɪkɪs/; born 1956 or 1957) is an American former talk radio personality best known for hosting The Tom Leykis Show from 1994 to 2009 (nationally syndicated), and April 2012 to 2018 (internet streamcast/podcast). The show follows the hot talk format, which brought Leykis much success, particularly in the Southern California radio market. Due to the provocative nature of the show, Leykis has often been described as a shock jock. The show's best-known feature is "Leykis 101", in which he claims to teach men how to get women while spending the least time, money, and effort.

Leykis retired in 2024, streaming his last new show on May 15.

== Early life ==
Leykis was born in New York City and spent his early childhood in the Bronx. His father was a union leader at The New York Post. He graduated from Newfield High School in Selden, New York at the age of 16, then entered Fordham University to study broadcasting, but dropped out due to financial problems.

== Career ==
Leykis began his radio career in the state of New York in 1970. At the age of 14, he was once a fill-in host for WBAB, and in 1979 was featured on Mark Simone's WPIX-FM talk show comedy The Simone Phone as the host's sidekick. In the mid-1970s Leykis hosted one of the first public access TV shows on Long Island's Cablevision system, "The Graffiti Hour", a call-in program. Leykis eventually left WPIX, later went to WBAI leaving in the fall of 1981 to go to Albany to work at WQBK. Leykis also contributed to a show called The Phonebooth on WABC that ended in 1981. After his departure from WABC, Leykis was offered a full-time radio hosting job in Staunton, Virginia.

Leykis credits his defining moment to seriously pursue a career in radio to an incident that occurred in the early 1980s, in which his then-girlfriend locked him out of their residence because she believed he didn't earn enough money; he has since stated that this was one of the most important events of his life. A few years later, Leykis appeared on an episode of 20/20 where she contacted his show in an attempt to resume their relationship and he declined.

On Monday, February 27, 1984, The Tom Leykis Show aired on WNWS in Miami to replace the WNWS night show hosted by talk radio personality Neil Rogers. Rogers, who had previously signed conflicting employment contracts with both WNWS (790 AM) and WINZ (940 AM), had just won permission from a Miami court to take his act to WINZ and hoped leaving WNWS would be devastating to Leykis' program. Rogers and Leykis became rivals and, in June 1984, just after Denver radio talk show host Alan Berg was assassinated, Leykis told listeners Neil Rogers' real name and urged callers to harass his on-air rival. By January 1985, Leykis had the top-ranking evening talk show in the market, edging out Rogers due to his show being preempted by sports broadcasts. In September 1985, Leykis abruptly left his WNWS job without notice over concern about the pending WNWS-WGBS merger and began work at Phoenix's KFYI.

As program director at KFYI, Leykis constructed a politically well-rounded host lineup inserting himself as a "left leaning libertarian" in the afternoons. Leykis was known for his method of gathering new callers for the station by provoking rival station KTAR. In 1987, Leykis abruptly left KFYI because of differences with station management that still has a shroud of secrecy surrounding the details. As of the late 1990s, KFYI hosts were prohibited from discussing the details of Leykis' departure from the station. While still in Phoenix, Leykis also had a local public-access television show called Backstage Pass.

After leaving Phoenix, Leykis moved on to Los Angeles to work for KFI, where he hosted a talk-radio program from 1988 to 1992, as a liberal counterpart to Rush Limbaugh. During this time, KFI was hit with a $6,000 Federal Communications Commission (FCC) indecency fine over Leykis' on-air comments; however, the fine was paid in full from contributions by listeners. During Leykis' tenure at KFI, KFI host Geoff Edwards was suspended and then resigned over an incident related to steamrolling a massive collection of Cat Stevens' work sent in by listeners, which was motivated by Leykis' denouncement of Cat Stevens' comments about Salman Rushdie. A local Nazi historian likened the stunt as being reminiscent of a Nazi book burning.

On September 29, 1992, KFI management dismissed Leykis with only an hour's notice, based on what Leykis claims they called "a business decision"; KFI assumed the obligation of paying him his contracted salary, estimated at $400,000 per year, for the remaining six months of his contract.

Leykis next moved on to Boston and WRKO. He later left the Boston station for a new job in Los Angeles after a publicized domestic disturbance with then-wife Susan at the end of 1993. In March 1994, pretrial probation was granted and the charges stemming from that assault were dropped in exchange for his attendance in a program for batterers.

In 1994, Leykis began the nationally syndicated program, The Tom Leykis Show on Westwood One from Culver City, California. The final years of the show were produced from Paramount Pictures studios in Hollywood.

Leykis started the internet streamcast network The New Normal Network, featuring streams like New Normal Music, in July 2010.

== The Tom Leykis Show ==
The Tom Leykis Show
- Genre: Hot talk
- Running time: 3–4 hours (including commercials)
- Country of origin: United States
- Home station: KMPC (1994–1996), none (1996–1997); KLSX (1997–2009); The New Normal Network (2012– end of 2018)
- Starring: Tom Leykis
- Announcer: Ben Patrick Johnson (1994–1997); Joe Cipriano (1997–2009); Howard Hoffman (2012–2018)
- Created by: Tom Leykis
- Produced by: Mike Dooley (1994–2000); Dean J. "Dino" DeMilio (2000–present)
- Executive producers: Eric Braverman (1994–1997); Eric Stanger (1997); Gary Zabransky (1997–present)
- Original release: April 4, 1994 – March 30, 2007 (Westwood One); April 2, 2007 – February 20, 2009 (CBS); April 2, 2012 – October 25, 2018 (New Normal Network)
- Opening theme: Enter Sandman by Metallica (1994–2009); untitled custom composition for the show by Taylor Locke and The Roughs (2012–present)
- Website: BlowMeUpTom.com
- Podcast: The Tom Leykis Show podcast

=== History ===
The Tom Leykis Show began in 1988 broadcasting from KFI in Los Angeles. Originally the show was often political in nature, a fact Leykis highlighted at the start of every episode by proclaiming his show the only radio talk show that is "not hosted by a right-wing wacko or a convicted felon", references to radio hosts Rush Limbaugh and G. Gordon Liddy, respectively. In addition to politics, the host commonly discussed relationships, religion (Leykis is an atheist), and other issues. On Fridays, listeners were allowed to call in and talk about anything they wanted, in contrast to other days when Leykis established a single topic for each hour of the show.

Friday was also the usual day for live appearances in cities around the U.S., when Leykis would broadcast from a bar or other public place with an audience present. The free-for-all subject matter and large crowds led to a rowdy atmosphere on Friday shows, and it was in this context that "Flash Fridays" began.

In 1997, Leykis's show was picked up by KLSX, an FM talk station in Los Angeles that also carried The Howard Stern Show. The station became the flagship for the show and Leykis began to tone down the political aspect of the show around this time, and started the "Leykis 101" segment soon after.

In 2002, The Tom Leykis Show was briefly heard on an irregular basis in New York City on WNEW. Leykis was moved to afternoons from nights to replace the recently fired Opie and Anthony of The Opie and Anthony Show. Leykis later reflected on his comparative lack of success in the New York market, explaining that the station never truly got behind him, "We were talking to [WNEW Show Director Mark Chernoff] about the show being on the station on a regular basis. He said, "This show will never work in New York." Now, that may be true or it may not be true but how do you know until the people have had a chance to listen to it?".

In addition to his weekday show, Leykis began hosting a new syndicated weekend show called The Tasting Room in February 2005, covering lifestyle topics such as wine and spirits, luxury cars, and high-end technology.

With the departure of Howard Stern to satellite radio in January 2006, KLSX became known on-air as "97.1 Free FM" – so-called to highlight that its stations broadcast free-to-air, funded by commercials, whereas satellite radio requires a subscription fee. The station was produced by CBS Radio as part of its Free FM format, and The Tom Leykis Show was broadcast in a number of affiliate markets nationwide including but not limited to Portland, Dallas, Seattle, Phoenix, Las Vegas as well as multiple California markets in addition to its Los Angeles flagship such as San Diego and San Francisco. Talkers Magazine, analyzing Arbitron data, show that Leykis has an estimated listening minimum weekly cume of over 1.75 million for Spring 2007, based on a national sample.

On February 20, 2009, KLSX changed its format to Top 40 (CHR) under economic pressures, and The Tom Leykis Show aired its final broadcast. The show ran Monday through Friday, 3:00 PM to 8:00 PM PT from Paramount Studios and 2:00 PM to 6:00 PM Saturdays in Hollywood, California and was heard in a number of major metropolitan markets on the West Coast of the United States.

Leykis's show returned on his podcast/streamcast network The New Normal Network at 3PM Pacific time, April 2, 2012 – one day after his CBS contract ended. The new uncensored show included a new theme song, fewer commercials, and "Leykis 101" news at the top of each hour. The new show was financed through both advertising and a premium subscription service that offers a less-compressed stream and podcast-on-demand ability. It was produced by Gary Zabransky along with associate producer Dean "Dino" DeMilio, and engineered by Mike Timpson, who replaced Art Webb after his departure in 2013. In February 2018, Tom Leykis announced that he would be ending his live show that year. The final live episode aired on October 25, 2018.

On October 13, 2018, Leykis announced a new podcast series that would be exclusive to his subscribers on his premiumtom.com website. His new podcasting venture commenced on October 29, 2018.

=== Format ===
Typically, Leykis discusses one topic per hour. He will introduce the topic by reading a news article or peer-reviewed study, or by discussing a personal anecdote or experience. He will then accept callers for discussion and debate.

=== Leykis 101 ===
The cornerstone of the program was the Thursday broadcast of "Leykis 101", in which the program is set up as an ad hoc lecture and question and answer session, over which Leykis presides as a self-styled "professor". The subject of the "101" segments are how men can spend less money on women while achieving greater sexual and personal success. The intent of his advice is to serve as a father figure for his mostly-male listeners. Thus, many callers address Leykis as "Dad" or "Father".

Along with general information on life for young men, Leykis's 101 advice mostly consists of his principles of looking out for oneself. He argues that the institution of marriage is flawed and that family court systems are often corrupt because DNA testing after childbirth is not mandatory to prevent paternity fraud, and because courts have forced men to pay child support even after DNA testing has established that a man was not actually a child's father. To guard against sperm theft, he advises men to dispose of their own condoms by flushing them down the toilet or filling them with tabasco sauce. Other examples of Leykis 101 guidelines include never dating single mothers or co-workers; never cohabiting with a woman; using birth control during each sexual encounter; and immediately ending a relationship if a woman issues an ultimatum. In the event of an unplanned pregnancy, Leykis advocates a strategy known as "The Hail Mary", whereby the man persuades the woman to have an abortion by promising to have children with her when they are ready in the future. Then as soon as she has the procedure, he dumps her.

Leykis constantly recommends that young men pursue their career or educational goals and avoid being distracted by serious relationships or marriage at a young age as he was. Leykis describes many women as "dream killers" (i.e., he argues that, in dating or marriage, women will typically prioritize their desires above a man's, and will actively discourage men's ambitions for fear of him leaving the relationship if he attains success). Furthermore, Leykis urges men to live frugally, including avoiding consumer debt (what Leykis describes as "renting money"); never spending more than $40 for a date; and saving cash and investing for the future. He has described men who neglect their bills as "immoral".

=== Features ===
A popular and long-running feature of the show is "Flash Friday", in which men are encouraged to drive with their headlights on and women are encouraged to expose their breasts to such vehicles. The feature began as a one-time bit; while on the air, Leykis recalled a radio host he listened to as a child, who asked his listeners in New York apartments to flash their lights on and off and then to look outside to see how many neighbors were doing the same, as a way to gauge the audience size (Jean Shepherd). Leykis asked his listeners to do the same with their car headlights, and a few minutes later, jokingly suggested that women flash their breasts. A listener called in to report that he saw a woman flashing fellow drivers, and it became a regular feature of the show. Both women and men commonly call during the Friday broadcast to alert other listeners as to their location, and to recount stories of flashing or being flashed, respectively.

=== Lawsuits ===
In July 1998, Tom Leykis and the production company Westwood One were sued by Karen Carpenter of Juneau, Alaska. She claimed to have suffered post-traumatic stress from disparaging and sexual comments Leykis made about her on the air. Leykis has stated on air that the case occupied much of his attention in the winter of 2002. Tom Leykis did win the case.

On June 25, 2003, Marty Ingels, a voice actor, called into Leykis's show and tried to challenge him on moral grounds. Ingels, who was much older than the typical caller to Leykis's show, was subjected to some rude remarks by the call screener who said that he was too old and should not be on the air. But Ingels was placed on the air, and Leykis also disparaged Ingels, stating "you're not just older than my demographic, you're the grandfather of my demographic". Leykis explained that he didn't want older callers because he was selling advertising aimed at younger listeners. Ingels sued the show for age discrimination. It was noted that Ingels could not really complain he was discriminated against because his call was in fact put on the air. As for Ingels, the actor was ordered to pay $25,000 in attorney's fees to Leykis.

==== On-air murder confession ====
Another widely publicized event took place in November 2006, when Leykis invited callers to make confessions about their wrongdoing or escapades which were never discovered. A listener from the Phoenix, Arizona area called the show and confessed to shooting the father of her child when he refused to pay child support. The caller described herself as a nurse who went by her middle name, Sue, and said that she shot the man in the heart with a 9 mm because she "knew how to aim for it", and moreover asserted that she made the shooting look like a suicide. Leykis asked if the woman was serious, and the woman explained how she "got away with it" because police believed "a blubbering, crying woman" and that she was never arrested or charged. Leykis informed her that she had made a murder confession live on the air, that the call-screener had her phone number, and that they would turn her information over to police. The woman ended her call.

Leykis denied allegations that the call was part of a hoax set up by the show, and producers turned over all information they had about the caller to police who began an investigation. Leykis discussed the confession on subsequent episodes of his show, urging listeners to phone a toll-free number if they had possibly relevant information, and offering a cash reward for information leading to conviction of the woman for murder. About a month later, former talk show host Geraldo Rivera asked Leykis about the incident on his Geraldo at Large syndicated television program. Geraldo: "So what was your first reaction when you got this call?" Leykis: "I was shocked. You know, people call talk shows and say all kinds of things, but they never confess to murder."

On August 7, 2008, Leykis interviewed an officer involved in the investigation. Evidence was presented to the Maricopa County Attorney's Office and charges were considered against Megan Suzanne Vice of El Mirage, Arizona. Her ex-boyfriend, Tortsen Rockwood, died of a gunshot wound in 2001, and, while the death was originally ruled a suicide, police later named Vice as their suspect in the case. Sometime after the murder confession was made on Leykis's show, Vice filed a police report stating that her cell phone had been stolen. In 2009, it was revealed that police reviewed the death of Rockwood and determined that all the evidence was consistent with suicide and that Vice would not be charged with murder; however, she was charged with filing a false police report for claiming that her cell phone was stolen.

==== Naming names ====
In 2003, Leykis raised controversy by revealing the name of Kobe Bryant's accuser in a Kobe Bryant sexual assault case. Other media outlets elected to reveal details of the alleged victim such as race and masked photographs while excluding her name, as was the standard practice at that time, raising privacy questions.

Major media outlets generally and voluntarily withhold names like these due to their adherence to journalism ethics and standards. However, the policy in practice only applies to alleged victims, allowing for the release of names of alleged offenders, a policy which Leykis disagrees with and does not follow, as he regularly states he is "not a journalist". Leykis contends that either all names in a case (the alleged offender[s] and the alleged accuser) should be protected or all should be public.

The radio show host has caused considerable controversy over the years for his practice of identifying such individuals by name on-air. Other such individuals he has named include:

- Vanessa Perhach, who accused Marv Albert of forcible sodomy (biting) in 1997.
- Angela Song, a woman associated with the Christian Coalition of America who tried to commit suicide by jumping off a bridge in Seattle, Washington.
- An accused child molester in SeaTac, Washington.
- Vili Fualaau, the 13-year-old victim of statutory rape by teacher Mary Kay Letourneau.
- Kenneth Pinyan, the Boeing Co. employee dropped off at a Seattle hospital dead from a perforated colon, later found to have engaged in bestial sexual intercourse with a horse.
- Crystal Mangum, a stripper, escort, and student at North Carolina Central University, who falsely accused three Duke University students (members of the lacrosse team) of rape, battery, and sodomy in what became known as the 2006 Duke University lacrosse case.

=== Ratings ===
For early 2008, Leykis had announced radio ratings at various angles. Among the 81 radio stations in Southern California the show was #9 overall, #6 in English stations, and #1 for time spent listening. Among men ages 18+, adults ages 18–34, and "the money demo" ages 25–54, the show was #1 in time spent listening with an average of over 4 hours per week, in addition to being #1 in share for men aged 18+.

=== End of terrestrial radio broadcast ===
The Tom Leykis Show had its last regular terrestrial broadcast on Friday, February 20, 2009, and ended at 5 p.m., the middle of its usual time slot. Leykis took calls until the last five minutes. At that point, the host mentioned that people had asked him how he was going to end the show. Saying "Let's tell the truth", Leykis commented that he knew since the previous summer that it was possible the flagship station (KLSX, which originated the broadcast of the show) would switch format. Saying he "tossed and turned", he thought about it and asked himself: "What could I say that would wrap this all up? And then one day I heard this song … and I realized – the lyrics of this song … are about me." With that, Leykis rolled into Joe Jackson's "I'm the Man" (the title track of Jackson's 1979 album). By the time the song was over, the studio was filled with people—as could be seen by the live online video broadcast on the station website. The host thanked his producers, the program director, the crowd in the studio, and everyone in southern California who made it "12 great years", and he finished with "Let's do this thing one more time..." The crowd yelled "Blow me up, Tom" one last time to end the show and mark the end of KLSX as "The FM Talk Station" in what coincidentally became a strikingly appropriate catch phrase to be had: The phrase "blow up the station" is a radio term for ending a particular format or station run. After a much longer than usual explosion sound effect, the crowd cheered and KLSX changed format from hot talk to CHR/Top 40, which continued until 2021 when it flipped to a simulcast of KNX (AM).

=== New Normal Network ===
When Leykis's show went off the air in 2009, he was in the middle of a five-year contract with CBS. This contract included the rights to his show over terrestrial radio, internet rights, and specific to airing on KLSX; this kept Leykis from appearing on any other CBS station. In addition, CBS also would not allow podcasts for them, as they were concentrating on other online ventures at the time. Despite all this, Leykis has no regrets over his contract terms, and still speaks highly of CBS. During his show's hiatus, he created The New Normal Network in 2010 including the Gary and Dino Show. The network has also at times held multiple music streams, in order to take the media into his own hands. After setting up his new network, Leykis announced on the network's website that his show would return on April 2, 2012, one day after the conclusion of his contract with CBS.

On the first day of the show's return, there were some streaming issues that were rectified within the first 30 minutes, due to a far greater influx of listeners that he was expecting. After receiving data from his analytic sources, Leykis announced on the air that in the first week of the show, over 401,000 different IP addresses tuned into the show.

During live broadcasts, The Tom Leykis Show was the top internet radio talk show in the world, as well as the number two internet radio station in the world, according to SHOUTcast.

On September 25, 2018, Leykis announced the end of his online stream and Internet call-in radio show would be on October 25, 2018. Leykis claimed there would be some form of podcast behind a paywall because of listeners who never purchased his Premium Tom paid podcast subscriptions. There was a counter tracking the number of subscriptions above 1900, which was the minimum required for the New Normal LLC to remain profitable.

== The Tasting Room ==
In 2005, Leykis was producing a weekend show, The Tasting Room with Tom Leykis. It first aired mostly on such West Coast stations as KGIL in Los Angeles, California and KFBK in Sacramento, California. It was produced by The New Normal Network and later has morphed into a two-hour podcast show. In the show he discussed "fine wine, high-end spirits, and craft brews [plus] first-rate dining and premium cigars". The show was first broadcast mostly on West Coast radio markets but has later moved online.

== Personal life ==
Leykis has no children. He says that four women he impregnated all had abortions.

His second marriage was to television reporter Christina Gonzalez. Leykis alleges that he discovered that she was cheating on him after he investigated some hotel receipts he found. Another marriage, which lasted one year, was with a Seattle woman in 1989, who was a listener of his show.

His fourth wife, Susan Drew Leykis, who first met Leykis at a Los Angeles Kings game, filed a police report against him while they were married and living in Boston in 1993. On December 22 of that year, she alleged that Leykis assaulted and threatened to kill her during a fight after they returned home from a radio station Christmas party. He was subsequently charged with "felony assault and battery and threatening to commit a crime"; according to police, she sustained bruises and scratches from the assault. In March 1994, Leykis was sentenced to a year of probation and ordered to attend a domestic violence class. He completed both, and the charges were dropped, although Leykis did not admit guilt as part of the agreement. The couple have since divorced.

In August 2004, Leykis was attacked outside a Seattle bar and all-night diner, The 5 Point Cafe. In the assault, he was kicked in the face and knocked down to the ground, causing him to require 17 stitches over one eye, and leaving him with scratches and bruises on his knees. The assailant reportedly had an accomplice who accused Leykis of calling him a name and hanging up on him when he called the show. The suspects left by taxi prior to police arriving on the scene and were jailed. Leykis refused to prosecute due to the distance and he felt that having a few days in jail was enough.

In late 2016, an obsessed fan was alleged to have called the show around 200 times a week and to have made threats against Leykis himself. A three-year restraining order was granted.
