= KXXT =

Radio station in Tolleson, Arizona

- Tolleson, Arizona; United States
- Broadcast area: Phoenix area
- Frequency: 1010 kHz
- Branding: Family Values Radio

Programming
- Format: Christian radio

Ownership
- Owner: Salem Media Group; (Salem Communications Holding Corporation)
- Sister stations: KKNT, KPXQ

History
- First air date: 1962 (as KCAC)
- Former call signs: KCAC (1961–1971); KHCS (1971–1978); KXEG (1978–2001); KXEM (2001–2004)
- Call sign meaning: The Roman numeral for 10 (X) repeated twice for its frequency of 1010, talk

Technical information
- Licensing authority: FCC
- Facility ID: 54742
- Class: B
- Power: 23,000 watts day; 9,800 watts critical hours; 300 watts night
- Transmitter coordinates: 33°30′28.00″N 112°13′04.00″W

Links
- Public license information: Public file; LMS
- Webcast: Listen Live
- Website: familyvaluesradio1010.com

KXXT (1010 AM) is a radio station broadcasting a Christian talk and instructional format. Licensed to Tolleson, Arizona, United States, the station serves the Phoenix area. KXXT uses the slogan "Family Values Radio" and is owned by Salem Media Group (under the licensee Salem Communications Holding Corporation).

KXXT is co-owned with Talk radio KKNT 960 AM Phoenix and KPXQ 1360 AM in Glendale, which also broadcasts a Christian radio format. KXXT operates with 23,000 watts by day, and can be heard as far south as Tucson and as far north as Cottonwood. But, because 1010 kHz is a Canadian clear channel frequency for Toronto's CFRB and CBR in Calgary, KXXT must reduce its power to 300 watts at night to reduce interference with those stations, rendering it effectively unlistenable outside of Phoenix proper after its critical hours reduction to 9,800 watts.

== History ==
=== KCAC ===
Harold Lampel and Dawkins Espy received the construction permit for KINK in 1958. Dawkins Espy was involuntarily removed from the license in 1961, at which time the KCAC calls were adopted; the station was sold to KCAC Broadcasting, Inc. in 1962. Construction of the facility began on July 19, 1962.

KCAC's studios were located at 20 E. Broadway, in Phoenix. It was one of the few radio stations in Arizona that were African American-owned and -operated. Among its DJs were Jim Titus, who, while at KRIZ radio in 1958, had become Phoenix's first African-American radio announcer.

KCAC's management decided to change to a Spanish-language format four years later, putting it in competition with KIFN, the original Spanish-language station in Phoenix, but the station was not a success.

In October 1968, the corporate entity E.S.H. Inc., led by president and Motorola electrical engineer George W. Soderquist, acquired KCAC while it was operating a struggling Spanish-language format. In September 1969, Soderquist's teenage son, Skip, and his friend Dave Kohn convinced Soderquist to hire Bill Compton away from KRUX. Compton was given full creative control as program director, immediately flipping KCAC into Phoenix's first full-time progressive, free-form rock station.

While the new format built a massive, loyal audience and resisted pressure from local conservative groups like the Arizona Breakfast Club—whose vocal opposition station president George Soderquist reportedly found more entertaining than concerning—the station's weak, 500-watt daytime-only AM signal ultimately faced imminent financial collapse. E.S.H. Inc. entered bankruptcy in late 1970, which paved the way for Compton and investor Dwight Tindle to acquire a 93.3 FM license and transition the entire displaced KCAC staff to launch KDKB in August 1971.

In an attempt to describe its free-form format in 1970, a guest columnist in The Arizona Republic described it thus:

Free-form programming as used by KCAC allows the individual announcer complete discretion. This allows some of the innovations in rock air time denied under Top 40 programming, as well as opening the door to other musical forms. A typical show on KCAC will include elements of jazz, blues, folk, classical, hillbilly, country, soul and, of course rock. The absence of prescheduled news programs allows occasional hour-and-a-half collages of uninterrupted music.

In November 1970, KCAC went bankrupt, and it was involuntarily assigned to a receiver. On August 14, 1971, the station went silent. When KCAC went bankrupt in 1971, Compton collaborated with KDKB co-owner Dwight Tindle to "invent" KDKB and its air sound. Several KCAC DJs made the move with Compton to KDKB—including Gary Kinsey (on-air name, Toad Hall) and Hank Cookenboo.

=== KHCS and KXEG ===
The 1010 AM frequency was subsequently bought by Golden West Christian School and reemerged as KHCS, with religious programming, in January 1972. The station fell back into bankruptcy with Golden West in December 1973, and nearly two years into receivership, the station was finally sold to Harold S. Schwartz and Associates, owners and operators of religious stations. In June 1976, Schwartz put a new, all-solid-state transmitter into service—believed to be the first in the world.

That August, KHCS relocated from Phoenix to Tolleson and increased its power to 1,000 watts; it also began broadcasting at night with 250 watts. KHCS became KXEG on April 13, 1978.

KXEG was primarily a religious station, but it also carried overflow coverage of Arizona State University sports in the late 1980s and 1990s when KTAR had other sports events to carry as well as Grand Canyon University basketball.

=== As a talk station ===
KXEG became news-talk KXEM on July 11, 2001 (on the same day, sister station KTKP retained the Christian format and KXEG call letters). On September 7, 2004, the station changed its call sign to the current KXXT, which was accompanied by a format change to Air America progressive talk radio under the name 1010 Talk. In October 2005, owner James Crystal Enterprises sold three stations, including KXXT and KXEG, to Communicom, which mostly owned stations with religious formats. The format change occurred on February 1, 2006; Air America programs would move to KPHX 1480 AM by the end of March.

In January 2011, after the assassination attempt against then-Arizona Representative Gabby Giffords, KXXT national talk show host Steve Sanchez of The Steve Sanchez Show offered 30 minutes of airtime to Westboro Baptist Church in exchange for the Church agreeing not to protest at the funeral of 9-year-old Christina Green who was killed during the assassination attempt.

In June 2014, Salem Communications, a national radio broadcaster focusing on Christian and conservative values programming, purchased KXXT in a bankruptcy auction for $575,000. Salem took full control of the station on October 1.
