= KQMX =

Radio station in Lost Hills, California

- Lost Hills, California; United States
- Broadcast area: Bakersfield metropolitan area
- Frequency: 105.7 MHz
- Branding: Qué Buena 105.7

Programming
- Format: Grupera; Regional Mexican

Ownership
- Owner: Agri Care Orchards Inc.

History
- First air date: 2010

Technical information
- Licensing authority: FCC
- Facility ID: 166070
- Class: B1
- ERP: 1,650 watts
- HAAT: 381 meters (1,250 ft)
- Transmitter coordinates: 35°26′28.5″N 119°57′19.5″W

Links
- Public license information: Public file; LMS

KQMX (105.7 MHz) is a commercial radio station licensed to Lost Hills, California, United States, and serving the Bakersfield metropolitan area. KQMX is owned by Juan Ayala's Agri Care Orchards Inc. of Tulare. It carries a Grupera and Regional Mexican format known as "Qué Buena 105.7."

== History ==
In June 2006, Magnolia Radio received a construction permit to build a new FM station on 99.5 in Lost Hills. The permit was then sold to Deportes y Musíca. The station remained unbuilt until 2010, when Grupo Multimedia bought the construction permits for KQMX and KRPH near Phoenix, Arizona.

For nearly a full year, from February 18, 2011, until the following February, KQMX was silent, pending a relaunch of the station by Grupo Multimedia/Deportes y Música. The station came back on the air on February 15, 2012.

Grupo Multimedia sold KQMX to Alfonso De Alba for $420,000, effective December 30, 2021. In May 2025, Alfonso De Alba, through licensee The De Alba Family Trust of 2000, sold KQMX to Juan Ayala's Agri Care Orchards Inc. for $900,000 plus $100,000 of advertising time
