= Urban adult contemporary =

Radio format

Urban adult contemporary, often abbreviated as urban AC or UAC, (also known as adult R&B,) is the name for a format of radio music, similar to an urban contemporary format. Radio stations using this format usually would not have hip hop music on their playlists, and generally include some mix of contemporary R&B and traditional R&B (while urban oldies stations emphasize only the latter). Urban adult contemporary playlists generally consist of many different genres that originated amongst Black Americans including R&B, soul, funk, disco, jazz, pop, hip-hop, electro, quiet storm, gospel, new jack swing, and hip-hop soul.

== Summary ==
The format usually plays some classic R&B hits, as well as hits that are ten years old or more. Classic dance music also has a great impact in this format. Disc jockeys use a more relaxed sound than their younger counterparts. News and current events have a major impact on the older audience. Around the evening, urban AC stations play smooth jazz during the Quiet Storm program. Many of the urban AC radio stations implement slogans such as "Classic Soul & Today's R&B", "(City/Region)'s Old School and R&B Station", "The Best Mix of R&B", and "(City/Region)'s R&B Leader." Some popular nicknames for urban oldies stations include "Magic" (borrowed from the adult contemporary format), "Mix" and "Star" (both borrowed from the Hot AC format), and "KISS-FM" (borrowed from top 40/CHR). WBLS in New York City, which is the flagship station of the urban contemporary format, was one of the first stations to introduce the urban AC format in 1994. WRKS-FM (also in New York City) introduced the first 24-hour classic soul radio station in the country. Urban AC stations usually target the 18-49 and 25-54 age groups.

Many urban AC stations rely heavily on syndicated programming such as The Steve Harvey Morning Show and The D. L. Hughley Show. Cumulus Media Networks also operates a 24/7 urban AC format delivered to affiliated stations via satellite, called "The Touch", which is common on smaller- and medium-market stations featuring the urban AC format.

KJLH in Los Angeles is one urban AC station whose playlist heavily emphasizes current material.

While artists were once reluctant to be on urban AC because it made them look "old", by 2024, young people had become a major part of the format. With mainstream urban becoming more of a hip-hop format, R&B was less of a factor there. Urban AC played more of a role in introducing records and artists than it had been. It was also more popular than mainstream urban.

== Urban oldies ==
"Urban oldies" refers to R&B music dating back to the late 1950s/early 1960s through the early 1990s. Although African Americans are the primary audience, radio stations playing this type of music often attract White listeners because R&B is one of the roots of rock and roll. A more mass-appeal version of the format is rhythmic oldies, which attracts both white and black listeners, as well as Latino listeners (particularly in the Southwest United States). One of the first stations to play this type of music was WRKS-FM (98.7 Kiss FM). In December 1994, Emmis Broadcasting transformed Kiss FM into the first station to play urban oldies music on a regular basis. The format was an instant hit with black and white listeners around the Greater New York area, reaching to number two on the Arbitron ratings.

Before WRKS, many of the stations playing this music were on AM radio. Primary artists included The Isley Brothers, McFadden & Whitehead, Aretha Franklin, Marvin Gaye, and The Temptations. One of the first stations to try the format was WSID in Baltimore in the late 1950s/1960s/1970s. WDGS in the Louisville market had a full-range urban AC format, with no rap music, as early as 1985. WDGS neatly substituted jazz, blues and urban/soul gold for the 35% of the playlists that were rap/hip-hop at the time, while playing 65% non-rap urban currents, to wide acclaim. WJMO in Cleveland and WVOL in Nashville were some of the early converts. KHYS in Houston switched to the format in 1999. KCJZ in San Antonio followed suit 7 months later. Early in 1994, M Street Journal reported 33 radio stations in the format, compared to 14 a year earlier. Many of these were affiliates of the Satellite Music Network format Urban Gold, which had 27 stations six months after starting October 1, 1993. Steve Harris, the SMN manager for urban radio, said no black radio stations had targeted adults over 35. Consultant Tony Gray said older adults did not like contemporary music, which had few tunes that had proved they could stand the test of time. And hip hop was becoming a bigger part of contemporary radio. Another factor was the availability of older records in remastered form. Hurricane Dave Smith of WJJJ in Pittsburgh, which had switched from smooth jazz, doubted the format would succeed on FM radio, but he believed listeners who enjoyed older songs were used to AM. Sean Ross of WGCI in Chicago believed the format could work either place, but stations that selected it would be those desiring something different. The satellite format focused on the years 1967 to 1978, but also played songs from as far back as 1963 and as recent as the early 1980s. Included were both ballads and uptempo songs. WGCI even played songs from the 1950s, including Unforgettable by Nat King Cole, though Ross said even teenagers liked the station because they had learned about older songs from their parents, and because newer versions of old songs were being recorded. Other stations included WRBO 103.5 in Memphis, WNPL in Nashville, KMEZ in New Orleans and WPLZ in Richmond.

In addition to WRBO, urban oldies stations include WATV (AM) in Birmingham, Alabama, and KAJM in Phoenix. Some urban oldies stations refer to this format as "old school," for example, WOSL in Cincinnati.

== Name controversy ==
There is disagreement in the music industry over the use of the term urban in describing music genres and formats. In June 2020, Republic Records and artist management company Milk & Honey stated that they would drop the use of the word in relation to music of a black origin. These decisions came in the wake of the murder of George Floyd at the hands of police and the subsequent protests.

Lance Venta of radio industry publication RadioInsight claimed that the term urban is outdated in that R&B and hip hop music have gained massive popularity outside the inner cities and the descriptor should not serve as a euphemism for "black music". He recommended substituting the terms adult R&B for the urban adult contemporary format and hip hop for urban contemporary.

Myron Fears, operations manager and program director of the black owned Carter Broadcast Group in Kansas City, defended the use of the urban tag. Responding to Republic's elimination of the term, he expressed concern that the action diminishes the status of black music executives within record companies and the industry as a whole:

I do not think it’s a great idea because it nullifies all the hard work that past African American music executives built. This potentially leads to the dissolving of people and positions within the Urban music division. Hip Hop and R&B is leading the way for the surge in music sales and usage of streaming. Are the other positions, titles and departments within a record company going to change or dissolve? ... Do they realize the cultural power of Urban Music?

— Myron Fears, Carter Broadcast Group operations manager/program director

In 2024, Billboard quoted P Music Group founder Michael Paran, who said of the magazine's Adult R&B chart, "the chart is named wrong ... Let's call it what it is: It's just R&B." More younger people were showing up on a chart that had been dominated by "legacy acts".

== See also ==
- Urban contemporary
- Contemporary R&B
- Rhythm and blues
- Soul music
- Classic soul
- Adult R&B Songs
- Adult contemporary music
