= Free FM =

Short-lived talk radio brand

Primary Free FM logo

Free FM was a format and brand name for eleven FM CBS Radio stations in the United States, and was created because of Howard Stern's departure to Sirius Satellite Radio in January 2006. Free FM was given its name to highlight that its stations broadcast free-to-air, instead of requiring a subscription fee like satellite radio services. Launched on October 25, 2005, Free FM was phased out over the course of 2007, with the final station using it, KLSX, dropping the brand in November 2008.

Free FM stations targeted a largely male demographic ranking from 18 to 49, attracting those who normally listen to FM rock and alternative stations, instead of existing AM talk radio listeners. Programs were more ribald than AM talk stations and include more discussion of dating, personal relationships, more comedy, and more discussion of celebrities and entertainment. Some Free FM stations also included music programs. Most Free FM programs were generally of the hot talk format.

One Canadian radio station, CFRI-FM in Grande Prairie, Alberta, used to use the Free FM brand name before flipping to '2DayFM', although its ownership and format are unrelated to the American stations.

== History ==
=== Initial launch ===
On October 25, 2005, Infinity Broadcasting (now Audacy) officially announced that it would be replacing Howard Stern on many of its radio stations with David Lee Roth in New York City and several other eastern markets, Rover's Morning Glory with Shane "Rover" French in the midwest, and Adam Carolla in Los Angeles and several other western markets, along with already established DC-based morning show The Junkies on WJFK-FM in D.C. and WHFS-FM in Baltimore. On the same day, several of these Infinity/CBS radio stations became known as "Free FM"; some of the stations already had an all-talk format, while others switched from a music format, and WXRK New York announced that it would become "Free FM" starting January 3, 2006.

In addition to the morning shows, Free FM also announced at this time the creation of Penn Radio, an hourlong radio show hosted from Las Vegas by illusionist Penn Jillette and co-hosted by Michael Goudeau, juggler at the Lance Burton Show. Other programming syndicated to a large number of Free FM stations included programming already in syndication at the time: The Don and Mike Show, The Tom Leykis Show, and Loveline. All three programs were being aired on Westwood One, at the time a corporate sister to CBS Radio.

On March 2, 2007, Penn Radio, hosted by Penn Jillette, aired its last show.

=== Demise and replacement of Roth ===
In April 2006 rumors were reported that Roth's show would be dumped due to low ratings (The ratings for Roth's show in morning drive went down eighty percent compared to Howard Stern's ratings in the same slot a year prior) and would be replaced by XM's Opie and Anthony. The move marked Opie and Anthony's return to the New York terrestrial radio scene and to CBS Radio; their show was canceled by CBS/Infinity in 2002 when they were syndicated through sister station WNEW-FM due to a broadcast of the "Sex For Sam III" skit from St. Patrick's Cathedral, New York that generated much controversy.

The move was confirmed by Opie and Anthony on their show and website on Friday, April 21. As of that date, David Lee Roth's web site, david.freefm.com, had disappeared along with any mention of him on the Free FM local affiliates. On Monday, April 24, a Flash presentation presented on the Free FM local affiliates alluded to a debut time of 9 a.m. that day for the announcement of the return of the Opie and Anthony show. The show debuted on the former David Lee Roth affiliates on April 26.

=== Demise of Rover ===
In addition to the departure of Roth, Rover's Morning Glory was removed from the Free FM stations—including what was his newly assigned flagship WCKG/Chicago, and WKRK/Detroit; both instances due to very low ratings. Following the WCKG cancellation, Rover returned to Cleveland, Ohio on his previous flagship, WXRK—which became WKRK-FM—and a handful of remaining affiliates.

Most of Rover's affiliates were on stations spun off by CBS Radio to different companies including WMFS/Memphis, WAQZ/Cincinnati and WZNE/Rochester, which went to Entercom; and WAZU/Columbus, which went to Wilks Broadcast Group. WAZU became country-formatted WNNK in January 2007, while WAQZ flipped to alternative rock as WSWD on a different frequency in November 2006; WMFS became an ESPN Radio affiliate in 2009. Rover's Morning Glory moved to rival station WMMS in 2008, thereby ending the CBS radio relationship altogether.

Now owned by Stephens Media Group, WZNE continued to air the show until November 2020.

=== Demise ===
With the lack of success that Free FM produced, CBS slowly phased out the homogenized Free FM brand. No new "Free FM" branded stations were launched since the network was created (although KCKC in Kansas City and KDJM (now KKSE-FM) in Denver were reportedly close to flipping to it before Free FM's demise), and new hot talk stations were branded in other ways: for instance, WTZN (now KDKA-FM) in Pittsburgh, Pennsylvania was launched as a hot talk station in April 2007 as "The Zone" instead of Free FM, and even that station has since changed formats twice, first to Top 40/CHR and then to sports radio.

In addition, all of the original Free FM stations eventually removed their "Free FM" branding, and have since changed formats altogether.

- WHFS in Baltimore — became Baltimore's FM Talk: A Free FM Station, later dropping A Free FM Station, and later flipped to sports radio 105.7 The Fan on November 3, 2008.
- KRLD-FM in Dallas (formerly KLLI) — reverted to Live 105.3, then also flipped to sports radio as 105.3 The Fan on December 8, 2008.
- WCKG in Chicago — became Chicago's FM Talk Station, followed shortly by The PaCKaGe. Changed to adult contemporary Fresh 105.9 on November 5, 2007, and given the new call letters WCFS-FM. Afternoon host Steve Dahl moved to sister station WJMK as morning host. In 2011, the station switched to an FM simulcast of all-news radio station WBBM (AM).
- WJFK in Washington — went from the standard 106.7 Free FM to Free FM 106.7 WJFK to Washington's Talk Superstation, 106.7 WJFK. On July 20, 2009, the station changed to sports radio 106.7 The Fan.
- WYSP in Philadelphia — dropped "Free FM" to become 94-1 WYSP, later reverting fully to their pre-Free moniker 94 WYSP as 94 WYSP Talks. Changed back to a Rock format on September 13, 2007 at 5:00 pm.
- WTZN in Pittsburgh — flipped back to a previous top 40 format known as B94, WBZW. Hosts Scott Paulsen, John Steigerwald and Dennis Miller moved to KDKA. Became SportsRadio 93.7 The Fan, KDKA-FM, on February 15, 2010.
- KIFR in San Francisco — was the first to drop Free FM, going to a classic hits format as KFRC (Adam Carolla, Opie and Anthony, and Tom Leykis moved to KYCY). In late October 2008, became an FM simulcast of news radio station KCBS (740) while retaining the KFRC call letters.
- WFNY in New York City — dropped Free FM altogether, and reverted to its previous modern rock format as WXRK "K-Rock". The station later operated with Top 40 formats under the 92.3 Now and 92.3 Amp Radio brands, before switching to alternative Alt 92.3 in November 2017. The station would switch again in October 2022 as an FM simulcast of sister all-news station WINS (AM), similar to the format switch in from KNOU in Los Angeles becoming KNX-FM the year prior, continuing the Alternative format on WINS-FM HD2. WINS was previously simulcasted during Hurricane Sandy in October 2012 during the "Now" era when WINS-AM's transmitter was damaged. The dropping of Free FM on WFNY was generally recognized as the moment marking the death of the network.
- KSCF in San Diego — dropped Free FM altogether, changed to modern AC Sophie @ 103.7 on June 22, 2007, top 40 Energy in 2012, and country as 103.7 KSON in 2017.
- KZON in Phoenix — dropped Free FM altogether, changed to rhythmic contemporary "101.5 Jamz" on June 22, 2007
- WKRK-FM in Detroit — dropped Free FM altogether, took over sister station WXYT's sports radio format, changing to WXYT-FM "Detroit's Sports Powerhouse"; currently "97.1 The Ticket"
- KLSX in Los Angeles — reverted to "97.1: The FM Talk Station" in 2008, then changed format altogether to contemporary hit "AMP Radio" on February 20, 2009, the "AMP" format would later be dropped and rebranded to "97.1 Now!" with the slogan "LA's Party Station" in April 2021 but would later drop the Top 40 format and revert to talk in December that year (this time News talk) simulcasting KNX (AM). This is the first time since KNX was simulcasted on FM radio since the late 1960s. The KNX-FM calls previously existed on sister station KCBS-FM on 93.1 (Now a Jack FM station) from 1948 to 1983 and again from 1986 to 1989. during this time, KNX began simulcasting on KRTH HD2.

As of June 2007, CBS Radio has all but completely dropped the title of "Free FM" as a format and has instead replaced it with the more generic "FM Talk." New domain names without the "Free FM" are now in use for several of the "Free FM" stations. By October 1, 2007, only one Free FM station remained: KLSX. In 2008, KLSX dropped the "Free FM" moniker and was simply referred to as "The FM Talk Station".

When KLSX switched format completely away from talk in February 2009, nearly all currently running shows were canceled, including The Adam Carolla Show which was the last program specifically created for Free FM to be discontinued, due to KLSX being its flagship station. The cancellation was a result of KLSX's shift to contemporary hit radio "AMP Radio" at that time. Two weeks later, Opie and Anthony were axed from terrestrial radio after WXRK changed formats, again to contemporary hit radio. The last hot-talk station in CBS's portfolio, WJFK-FM, abandoned the format for sports radio in July 2009, resulting in the cancellation of the Mike O'Meara Show, which was syndicated to many hot talk and Free FM stations.

CBS Radio's corporate successor Entercom introduced a hot talk-oriented format on KEGY San Diego (which, upon the completion of the merger in November 2017, had moved its long-time country format as KSON to the former KSCF in exchange for then-current Energy format), branded as The Machine, in March 2018. The station featured hot talk programming during its weekday lineup, but broadcast classic rock interspersed with comedy bits at all other times, along with San Diego Padres baseball. The format, however, was short-lived; a promotional campaign for KEGY's Kevin Klein morning show (which invited listeners to "Jump ... to a new morning show", over a photo of the San Diego–Coronado Bridge) attracted criticism for glorifying suicide by bridge jumping, while Padres executive Ron Fowler expressed concerns over being associated with the station's content. KEGY transitioned to a conventional sports talk format as The Fan on April 12, 2018.

=== Former Free FM stations ===
- New York — WFNY-FM 92.3, now WINS-FM
- San Francisco — KIFR 106.9, now KFRC-FM
- Philadelphia — WYSP 94.1, now WIP-FM
- San Diego — KSCF 103.7, now KSON
- Phoenix — KZON 101.5, now KALV-FM
- Pittsburgh — WTZN-FM 93.7, now KDKA-FM
- Detroit — WKRK-FM 97.1, now WXYT-FM
- Chicago — WCKG 105.9, now WCFS-FM
- Baltimore — WHFS 105.7, now WJZ-FM
- Los Angeles — KLSX 97.1, now KNX-FM
- Dallas — KLLI 105.3, now KRLD-FM
