= KZON =

Radio station in Sun City West, Arizona, United States

- Sun City West, Arizona; United States
- Broadcast area: Phoenix metropolitan area
- Frequency: 95.1 MHz
- Branding: 95.1 The Wow Factor

Programming
- Format: Oldies; classic hits

Ownership
- Owner: Zelus Media Group; (Zelus Esports, LLC)
- Sister stations: KKFR; KMVA

History
- First air date: 1996
- Former call signs: KFMR (1996–2005); KVIB (2005–2014); KOAI (2014-2026)
- Call sign meaning: Arizona

Technical information
- Licensing authority: FCC
- Facility ID: 16770
- Class: C
- ERP: 41,000 watts
- HAAT: 849 meters (2,785 ft)
- Transmitter coordinates: 34°14′5″N 112°22′2″W

Links
- Public license information: Public file; LMS
- Webcast: Listen live (may be restricted)
- Website: 951thewowfactor.com

KZON (95.1 FM) is a commercial radio station, licensed to Sun City West, Arizona, and serving the Phoenix metropolitan area. The station is owned by Zelus Media Group. It broadcasts an oldies and classic hits radio format, featuring mostly hits from the 1960s, 1970s and 1980s. It primarily competes with Audacy-owned KOOL-FM, which concentrates on 1980s hits, with some 1970s and 1990s titles.

KZON has an effective radiated power (ERP) of 41,000 watts. The transmitter is in Crown King, Arizona, about 50 miles (80 km) northwest of Phoenix, giving KZON a rimshot signal in the metro area. The studios and offices are on 7th Street in Midtown Phoenix.

== History ==
The station went on the air in 1996 as KFMR, licensed to Winslow, broadcasting from Mingus Mountain and covering areas of Northern Arizona. It was owned by Ted Tucker's Desert West Air Ranchers Corporation. Tucker moved the station in 2000 to the Crown King site (along with a change of city of license to Mayer, later changed again to Sun City West). It was sold in 2004 to Sun City Communications for $18.7 million. The new ownership flipped KFMR from a simulcast of Tucker's KCDX to a Hispanic rhythmic ("hurban") format as KVIB "Latino Vibe". As Latino Vibe, KVIB played a youth-oriented radio format playing both Spanish-language and English-language pop. The station's mix of music targeted the Valley's burgeoning young Latino population, particularly long-time residents who could speak English but prefer Spanish.

On January 23, 2014, KVIB changed its format to Spanish language adult contemporary, branded as "Solamente Éxitos" with a bilingual presentation.

On August 13, 2014, at noon, 95.1 flipped to soft adult contemporary in English as "95.1 The Oasis", and nine days later, the station changed its call sign to KOAI. The last song of the Spanish AC format was "Royals" by Lorde with the first song on The Oasis being Cool Change by the Little River Band. The station played a Christmas music format for the 2014 holiday season, the second station in Phoenix after KESZ.

On April 9, 2015, 95.1 gained an FM translator, K235CB 94.9 on South Mountain (licensed to Chandler), and also began simulcasting on the HD2 digital subchannel of KEXX.

In May 2015, KOAI adjusted its playlist to include more up-tempo selections from the 1990s through the present time, while still retaining a gold/soft AC-lean.

On June 5, 2015, KOAI picked up Delilah's syndicated evening radio show. Delilah continued on the station through two format changes, first to a mainstream adult contemporary station, and then to classic hits. Delilah was discontinued on August 25, 2017, with evenings featuring more music.

On September 30, 2019, at 5 p.m., after playing "Addicted to Love" by Robert Palmer, KOAI changed its format from classic hits to a new format concept for baby boomers developed by veteran radio programmer John Sebastian. It originally blended pop, rock, soul, and country from a seven-decade span and branded as "The Wow Factor". The first song on The Wow Factor was "Ride My See-Saw" by The Moody Blues.

On November 10, 2026, the KZON call sign moved to this station from 103.9 FM, after the sale of KMVA (97.5 FM) to the Good News Broadcasting Network. The previous KZON then became KMVA.
