= KNUV =

Radio station in Tolleson, Arizona

KNUV and KRPH
KNUV: Tolleson, Arizona; KRPH: Morristown, Arizona; United States
- Broadcast area: Phoenix metropolitan area
- Frequencies: KNUV: 1190 kHz; KRPH: 99.5 MHz
- Branding: La Onda

Programming
- Language(s): Spanish
- Format: Talk radio (brokered programming)

Ownership
- Owner: Laura Aispuro Madrid; (La Promize Company LLC)

History
- First air date: KNUV: January 23, 1961; KRPH: 2011
- Former call signs: KNUV: KZON (1961–1963); KRDS (1963–1997); KMYL (1997–2005)
- Call sign meaning: KNUV: "New" Radio "Venture" (previous owner)

Technical information
- Licensing authority: FCC
- Facility ID: KNUV: 29019; KRPH: 166065
- Class: KNUV: D; KRPH: C2
- Power: KNUV: 640 watts (day); 22 watts (night); KRPH: 7,900 watts
- HAAT: KRPH: 371 meters (1,217 ft)
- Transmitter coordinates: KNUV: 33°29′37″N 112°8′21″W; KRPH: 34°08′46″N 112°41′56″W; 33°57′17″N 112°28′34″W

Links
- Public license information: KNUV: Public file; LMS; KRPH: Public file; LMS
- Website: laondaradio.digital

KNUV (1190 AM) is a commercial radio station licensed to Tolleson, Arizona, United States, and serving the Phoenix metropolitan area. It is owned by Laura Aispuro Madrid, through licensee La Promize Company LLC. The station has a Spanish radio format using brokered programming where hosts pay for their time on the station. Most programs are talk-based, with some music shows. The transmitter was on South 95th Avenue at West Jefferson Street in Tolleson. It has moved to share with KXEG 1280 AM in West Phoenix.

KRPH (99.5 MHz) is a commercial FM radio station licensed to Morristown, Arizona, and serving the northwest suburbs of Phoenix. It is also owned by La Promize Company and simulcasts KNUV. KRPH has an effective radiated power (ERP) of 7,900 watts. A booster transmitter, dubbed KRPH-FM1, previously operated in Wittmann, Arizona.

== History ==
=== History of KNUV ===
The station in Tolleson signed on the air on January 23, 1961. It was originally owned by E. O. Smith and used the call sign KZON. It switched to a Regional Mexican format, becoming KRDS in 1963. The station operated as "Cards Country" with a country music format prior to adopting a talk radio format in the early 1970s. It changed to a Christian radio format in 1975, featuring religious talk and music.

KRDS was simulcast on KRDS-FM 105.3 in Wickenburg in the 1990s. In 1997, the station changed its call sign to KMYL. KMYL aired the "Music of Your Life" adult standards format, and later changed to "NBC 1190", as a variety talk station (later an infomercial and brokered talk station) which ran NBC Radio News at the top of the hour.

==== La Buena Onda ====
The format was changed in August 2005 when the station was acquired by a startup group, New Radio Venture, which brought a Spanish-language news/talk format targeting the large Spanish-speaking immigrant population in the Phoenix metropolitan area. At the same time, NRV bought a Denver station, which it christened KNRV, and gave it an identical format. The newly renamed KNUV became known as "La Buena Onda" (The Good Wave). At the peak of the first Buena Onda era, KNUV had Lily Antonini Latina reporter with breaking news every half an hour and with live reports and interviews. The station also was the English-language radio home of the Phoenix Mercury of the WNBA.

On November 9, 2007, KNUV protested the police description of the "Chandler Rapist" as a "Hispanic", claiming it amounted to racial profiling. The man, believed to be responsible for six attacks on teenage girls starting in June 2006 was described as Hispanic, 28 to 40 years old, 5 feet 6 inches tall, muscular, with a mustache and black hair. KNUV was the first Hispanic news media outlet to promote and follow up the story.

KNUV and KNRV signed off on July 31, 2008. The station was shut down due to "a faltering economy, ongoing crackdowns on undocumented immigrants and a tough market for Spanish talk radio".

==== Progressive talk format ====
After being silent for two months, KNUV began simulcasting crosstown station KPHX on October 9, 2008. KPHX's progressive talk radio programming, consisting of programming from Nova M Radio and Air America Radio, was moved to KNUV in January 2009 as Nova M's licensing agreement with KPHX came to an end. KNUV assumed the flagship station designation for Nova M, which later became On Second Thought before ceasing operations entirely by the spring of 2009. KPHX adopted The Lounge Sound music radio format at that time, which itself lasted only until July 2009, when KPHX returned to the progressive talk format, with significant involvement from Dr. Mike Newcomb, a key player in that format on each of the stations on which it had been broadcast in the Phoenix market dating back to 2004.

==== Spanish radio returns ====
According to the Phoenix New Times paper KNUV's doors were padlocked shut on March 2, 2009. On the morning of March 5, 2009, KNUV stopped broadcasting progressive talk and switched back to a Spanish-language format later that afternoon.

In April 2009, the station went off the air due to station owner New Radio Venture's bankruptcy. On July 13, 2009, the station returned to the air again, airing paid programming in Spanish and news programming from Mexico at other times. KNUV would air a limited selection of local programming during the daytime and Radio Fórmula programs from Mexico at night.

=== History of KRPH ===
In December 2006, ACE Radio Corporation received a construction permit to build an FM station on 99.5 in Yarnell, Arizona. It was then sold to Magnolia Radio. The station remained unbuilt until 2010, when Grupo Multimedia bought the construction permits for KRPH and KQMX in Lost Hills, California. By this time the permit specified operation in Morristown, closer to Phoenix. From August 2011 to July 2012, KRPH was silent pending a relaunch of the station by Grupo Multimedia/Deportes y Música.

From September 2024 to February 2025, KRPH simulcast KXEG (1280 AM) in Phoenix, originally broadcasting as an affiliate of MeTV Music and later as an oldies station called "The Time Machine". In February 2025, the station was sold to La Promize Company, LLC and began simulcasting KNUV.
