= Dick and Skibba =

Radio Program

The Dangerous Dick and Skibba show was a radio program on 103.7 Free FM in San Diego. The show aired from March 1, 2006, through February 14, 2007. Previously they had done past midnight shows on Saturday at 1am, additionally Sundays at 9pm, on 97.1 Free FM, Los Angeles.

The show had a free-form talk radio format that featured the irreverent observations of its hosts and a dedicated contingent of callers. By 2007, the duo had earned a loyal following, whom the hosts termed the Dick and Skibba Nation. Dick and Skibba covered a variety of topics, but most frequently discussed dating and relationships.

Before getting their own show, Dick and Skibba had extensive experience in the radio industry. Dick was a producer and writer for the Frosty, Heidi & Frank show in Los Angeles, and a former standup comedian. He was a proponent of using MySpace to promote the show. Skibba, on the other hand, shunned the Internet. Both hosts frequently appeared at publicity events for the station.

The hosts were often joined on the microphone by their board operator Radar, whose nickname stemmed from his resemblance to Radar O'Reilly from the M*A*S*H franchise. Another frequent contributor was News Girl Lindsay Delong.

The hosts have occasionally done fill-in shows on 97.1 KLSX Los Angeles and New York's 92.3 Free FM.

Beginning in October 2009, Dick and Skibba began podcasting their show which can be heard on HotTalkLA.com and iTunes.
