= KMLE =

Country music radio station in Chandler, Arizona, United States

- Chandler, Arizona; United States
- Broadcast area: Phoenix metropolitan area
- Frequency: 107.9 MHz (HD Radio)
- Branding: KMLE Country 107.9

Programming
- Language: English
- Format: Country
- Subchannels: HD2: Sports gambling "The Bet"

Ownership
- Owner: Audacy, Inc.; (Audacy License, LLC)
- Sister stations: KALV-FM; KOOL-FM

History
- First air date: April 18, 1980; 46 years ago
- Former call signs: KLRG (1979, CP)
- Call sign meaning: Pronounced "Camel"

Technical information
- Licensing authority: FCC
- Facility ID: 59965
- Class: C
- ERP: 96,000 watts; 100,000 watts (with beam tilt)
- HAAT: 529 meters (1,736 ft)
- Transmitter coordinates: 33.334°N 112.063°W

Links
- Public license information: Public file; LMS
- Webcast: Listen live (via Audacy); Listen live (via Audacy) (HD2)
- Website: www.audacy.com/kmle1079

KMLE (107.9 FM) is a commercial radio station, licensed to Chandler, Arizona, and serving the Phoenix metropolitan area. The station is owned by Audacy, Inc. and airs a country music radio format. The studios and offices are on North Central Avenue in Downtown Phoenix.

The transmitter is off Road D in South Mountain Park amid other towers for Phoenix-area FM and TV stations. It has an effective radiated power (ERP) of 96,000 watts (100,000 with beam tilt). KMLE broadcasts in the HD Radio hybrid format. Its HD2 subchannel carries a sports gambling format known as "The Bet." Its HD3 subchannel previously carried a simulcast of Phoenix-licensed translator K257CD (99.3 FM) from Sierra H Multimedia-owned KAJM (1580 AM) in Tempe with a rhythmic adult contemporary format.

== History ==
=== Early years ===
KMLE's first owners got a construction permit from the Federal Communications Commission in 1979, to build a new FM station under the call sign KLRG. Those call letters were never used, and the owners eventually acquired the KMLE call sign on June 18 of that year. The station officially signed on the air on April 18, 1980. The station was owned by Radio KMLE, Inc., with George T. Wilson serving as President and General Manager.

At first, KMLE aired an easy listening format. For most of the 1980s, it was a brokered time Christian radio outlet. National and local religious leaders would pay the station a fee for half hour segments of airtime, during which they could ask for donations to their radio ministry.

=== Switch to country ===
On October 24, 1988, Shamrock Broadcasting purchased the station and changed the station's format to country music as "Camel Country". At the time, KNIX-FM was often the leading station in the Phoenix ratings, having been a country outlet since 1969, first under the ownership of singer and TV host Buck Owens and later Clear Channel Communications, now known as iHeartMedia.

Since then, KMLE and KNIX have been locked in a long time battle for Phoenix country listeners. Occasionally there would be a third country station in Phoenix as well, but those attempts did not last more than a few years, with KMLE and KNIX often trading the lead among country listeners.

=== Ownership changes ===
In 1997, KMLE was acquired by Chancellor Media, which later merged into AMFM, Inc. In 2000, the station came under the ownership of the Infinity Broadcasting Corporation. Infinity was later merged into CBS Radio.

Previous logo

On February 2, 2017, CBS Radio announced it would merge with Entercom. The merger was approved on November 9, 2017, and was consummated on the 17th.

== HD Radio ==
KMLE broadcasts in the HD Radio format. The main signal is a simulcast of KMLE's country music programming. At first, the HD2 signal carried Tim and Willy's Classic Country. Tim and Willy were terminated from the radio station during the summer of 2012. The HD2 subchannel now carries "Country Thunder." In November and December, it switches to all-Christmas music, with only a few public service announcements per hour and no commercials.

On February 23, 2022, KMLE added The Bet to its HD3 subchannel.

On February 26, 2026, KMLE-HD3 and K257CD became the exclusive home of KAJM's rhythmic AC format, branded as "Mega 99.3". KAJM began running a loop directing listeners to KMLE-HD3/K257CD.
