= KSON (FM) =

- San Diego, California; United States
- Broadcast area: Greater San Diego
- Frequency: 103.7 MHz (HD Radio)
- Branding: 103.7 KSON

Programming
- Language: English
- Format: Country music

Ownership
- Owner: Audacy, Inc.; (Audacy License, LLC)
- Sister stations: KBZT; KWFN; KXSN; KYXY

History
- First air date: February 1965
- Former call signs: KSDO-FM (1965–71); KOZN-FM (1971–79); KJQY (1979–95); KMKX (1995–96); KPLN (1996–2005); KSCF (2005–12); KEGY (2012–17)
- Call sign meaning: From the 97.3 frequency's original AM sister station KSON (now KNSN); likely a homonym for "sun"

Technical information
- Licensing authority: FCC
- Facility ID: 59816
- Class: B
- ERP: 26,500 watts
- HAAT: 210 meters (690 ft)
- Transmitter coordinates: 32.8389°N 117.2498°W

Links
- Public license information: Public file; LMS
- Webcast: Listen live (via Audacy)
- Website: www.audacy.com/kson

KSON (103.7 MHz, "103-7 KSON") is a commercial FM radio station licensed to San Diego, California. Owned by Audacy, Inc., the station broadcasts a country music format.

The station's current call letters and programming originate from a sister station now known as KWFN. Following Entercom (now Audacy)'s merger with CBS Radio, the new sister stations swapped signals to improve KSON's reach following the divestment of its former simulcast partner on 92.1 FM. Prior to its current format, the station had aired beautiful music, top 40, various adult contemporary formats, and classic rock formats, as well as CBS Radio's ultimately unsuccessful hot talk format Free FM.

KSON broadcasts in the HD Radio format; its second subchannel formerly featured a legendary country format branded as Nashville Legends.

== History ==
=== Classical (1965–1971) ===
The station began broadcasting in February 1965 as KSDO-FM, and aired a classical music format. It was co-owned with KSDO AM.

=== Country (1971–1977) ===
In spring 1971, the station adopted a country music format. On August 16, 1971, the station's call sign was changed to KOZN-FM, and it was branded "Your Country Cousin". The station was later branded "Z-104".

=== Beautiful music (1977–1990) ===
On September 7, 1977, the station adopted a beautiful music format. On May 20, 1979, the call letters were changed to KJQY and the station was known as "K-Joy". In the late 1980s, KJQY and other Group W easy listening stations shifted to a format termed "adult spectrum radio". Instrumentals continued to make up a majority of the station's playlist, but it became more jazz oriented.

=== Adult contemporary (1990–1995) ===
In 1990, it shifted to a soft AC format. The station was branded "Sunny 103.7".

=== Classic rock (1995–2005) ===
On February 16, 1995, it became "Rock Mix 103.7", playing classic rock music. Its callsign was changed to KMKX the following month. On July 5, 1996, the call letters changed to KPLN and the station was then known as "The Planet", continuing with a classic rock format. The KPLN calls are now assigned to a hot adult contemporary station serving Billings, Montana.

=== Hot talk (2005–2007) ===
On October 25, 2005, the station changed formats from classic rock to an FM talk format with the brand "Free FM", and their call letters changed on October 28 from KPLN to KSCF. In December 2005, Howard Stern left the terrestrial airwaves and moved to Sirius Satellite Radio. At the beginning, Adam Carolla was their morning show host. He started January 3, 2006, replacing Stern.

On March 1, 2006, The Phil Hendrie Show was replaced by the Dick and Skibba Show, a local show formerly from sister 97.1 Free FM in Los Angeles. The show aired in the 7pm-10pm time slot, then the only live and local talk show in San Diego in the evening. As a result, this pushed Phil Hendrie to a later 10pm-1am time slot. Dick and Skibba were fired on February 14, 2007, according to program director Jim Daniels, the show was too cerebral for San Diego.

On March 5, 2007, the Generation Y University Show replaced the Dick and Skibba show. The show was hosted by three 23-year-old men who were all Mt. Carmel High School alumni who grew up in Rancho Peñasquitos. The show had previously aired on Sunday afternoons from 5pm-7pm. The show was cancelled on April 25, 2007, and replaced by Generic Radio.

At first, CBS Radio had high hopes for KSCF with extensive marketing aimed at attracting the adult male demos, but ever since they switched formats from KPLN to Free FM, the station's ratings started to drop. In fall 2005, (when 103.7 became Free FM), ratings were at a 2.2 share, mainly due to Howard Stern being the morning show host. In the beginning of 2006, 103.7's ratings dropped in half to a rating of 1.1, due to a much less popular Adam Carolla morning show. The ratings would later slip in Summer 2006 to a rating of 1.0, and remained at 1.0 in the Fall 2006.

In the end, the attempt to make Free FM a success in San Diego had proven to be too difficult and like other Free FM sister stations in New York City (WFNY) and San Francisco (KIFR), which returned to active rock and classic hits respectively, KSCF decided to switch formats in June 2007. To add to the demise of the Free FM family of stations, its sister station in Phoenix (KZON) flipped to Rhythmic Contemporary at the same exact time as KSCF's format switch.

=== Modern adult contemporary (2007–2012) ===
On June 22, 2007, at 3 p.m., KSCF flipped to Oldies as "K-Surf 103.7." The first song played was "Surfin' U.S.A." by The Beach Boys. They were supposed to be the market's first FM Oldies outlet since 2005, when XHOCL had the format prior to its flip to Regional Mexican. The last song played in the short-lived oldies format was "Bobby's Girl" by Marcie Blane. Following "Bobby's Girl" at 5 p.m., the Oldies format turned out to be a stunt as the station revealed its true format, Modern AC, branded as “Sophie @ 103.7”, adapted slightly from sister station KLLC in San Francisco, which is known as Alice @ 97.3. Its first song under this format was Jack Johnson's "Upside Down", followed by Fall Out Boy's "Thnks fr th Mmrs."

=== Top 40 (2012–2017) ===
Logo as "Energy 103.7"

On March 29, 2012, CBS Radio announced that at 5 pm that day, it would flip KSCF to a CHR format with a heavy emphasis on upbeat rhythmic, dance and pop hits targeting teens and adults 18–34 years old, as "Energy 103.7". In a statement made to radio industry website All Access, SVP/Market Manager Bob Bolinger noted that "Today's charts are dominated by energetic and upbeat Top 40 hits and the fans of this popular music are among the most engaged and digitally focused listeners. Using a powerful combination of over the air and online will produce a superior product and great results for brands that support the station". On April 2, KSCF changed its call letters to KEGY. Energy 103.7 also hosted kids from San Diego County on the show for short generalized quizzes.

On September 4, radio show host AJ Machado announced via AJ in the Morning's Facebook page that he would be joining KEGY in morning drive. AJ and his longtime producer, Hula, have been without a radio show home since leaving Star 94.1 in mid-July of the same year.

=== Country (2017–present) ===
Logo under previous slogan

On February 2, 2017, CBS Radio announced it would merge with Entercom (which owns KBZT, KXSN and KSON). Prior to the completion of the transaction, both KEGY and KSON announced that they would be moving to different signals; the two stations ultimately swapped. Immediately after the deal closed on November 16 at 9:00 p.m. (which would be midnight on the 17th at Entercom's headquarters), Entercom moved the country format and KSON intellectual properties to 103.7; 97.3 then began stunting with a loop advising listeners of the swap, while KEGY's Energy programming was temporarily moved online-only over the weekend before re-launching there the following Monday. The callsigns were swapped on November 24, completing the move.

KSON was home to one of the longest running award-winning shows. The "KSON Bluegrass Special" with Wayne Rice started on March 7, 1976, with the last show airing on September 13, 2020. For 44 years and more than 2,300 shows, San Diego bluegrass fans found a home on KSON as the station transitioned from AM to AM/FM to FM to streaming on radio.com from vinyl records to CDs to MP3s. At the same time the show was being cancelled, the International Bluegrass Music Association was presenting another award to long time DJ Wayne Rice.

As of January 3, 2025, KSON is the home of "John and Tammy in the Morning" every weekday morning.

== HD Programming ==
KSON broadcasts using an HD Radio transmitter, the HD1 channel is the digitized standard signal as required by law. It formerly had two subchannels.

=== Previous HD channels ===
- HD2: Until the sale to Entercom, a simulcast of KROQ-FM in Pasadena and afterwards, the national "Nashville Legends". HD2 channel is off the air as of February 23, 2023
- HD3: Until the sale to Entercom, House of Sophie, a dance hits format, later became Entercom Radio alternative music after the format change and sale. HD3 channel is off air as of November 17, 2018
