= KFNN =

Radio station in Mesa, Arizona, United States

Simulcasts WCPT Willow Springs, Illinois
- Mesa, Arizona; United States
- Broadcast area: Phoenix metropolitan area
- Frequency: 1510 kHz
- Branding: WCPT 820

Programming
- Format: Progressive talk radio
- Affiliations: AP Radio News; NBC News Radio; Pacifica Radio; Westwood One

Ownership
- Owner: Heartland Signal, LLC; (KFNN LLC)

History
- First air date: November 1, 1962
- Former call signs: KALF (1962–1970); KMND (1970–1971); KDKB (1971–1978); KDJQ (1978–1984); KNTS (1984–1986); KJAA (1986–1988)
- Call sign meaning: "Financial news" (previous branding used as a business news/talk format)

Technical information
- Licensing authority: FCC
- Facility ID: 14382
- Class: D
- Power: 22,000 watts (day); 100 watts (night)
- Transmitter coordinates: 33°41′34.1″N 112°0′11.5″W
- Translator: 105.3 K287BX (Mesa)

Links
- Public license information: Public file; LMS
- Webcast: Listen live
- Website: heartlandsignal.com/wcpt820/

KFNN (1510 AM) is a commercial radio station licensed to serve Mesa, Arizona. It airs a progressive talk radio format, broadcasting as a simulcast of WCPT Chicago. The station is owned by Heartland Signal, LLC under licensee KFNN LLC.

By day, KFNN is powered at 22,000 watts. At night, because 1510 AM is a clear-channel frequency reserved for Class A station WLAC in Nashville, Tennessee, KFNN must reduce nighttime power to 100 watts to prevent interference. It uses a directional antenna at all times. The station's transmitter is on Black Mountain Boulevard at Rough Rider Road in Phoenix. KFNN can also be heard on FM translator K287BX at 105.3 MHz in Mesa.

== History ==
=== Early years ===
Maricopa County Broadcasters, owned by Sheldon Engel, built KALF in 1962. The station signed on the air on November 1. It was a daytimer, required to go off the air at sunset. On June 1, 1970, it was relaunched as KMND ("Command Radio"), airing a country music format; the call sign had already been in use on KMND-FM 93.3. KMND-AM-FM was acquired by the Dwight-Karma Broadcasting Corporation in 1971. The call signs switched to KDKB and KDKB-FM, playing an album-oriented rock format.

In 1978, the simulcast was broken, and 1510 AM flipped to an oldies sound of the 1950s and 1960s under a new KDJQ call sign. In 1980, the format at KDJQ changed to new wave music for a brief time.

WABQ, Inc., acquired KDJQ in early 1984 and sold it to B.J. Glascock of Texas. The station went off the air on June 5 and returned on November 5 as KNTS with a news-talk format and ABC Talkradio programming. On August 23, 1986, the station changed its call sign to KJAA with a country format, known as "KJ Country". The brand traded on the heritage of KJJJ (910 AM), a longtime country music station.

=== KFNN ===
On December 12, 1988, 1510 AM changed its call sign to KFNN. The station adopted a financial news format under the ownership of Ron Cohen, a former real estate agent.

The station's transmitter and towers at the time of the change were located in Mesa, its city of license as stated on its Federal Communications Commission license. It was originally a 10,000-watt daytime signal until 1991, when the station towers were relocated to North Phoenix. From there the signal was authorized to increase to 22,000 watts daytime, and nighttime authorization was added. In 2013, KFNN began simulcasting on FM, through translator station K257CD on 99.3 MHz. In 2017, the 99.3 translator began simulcasting co-owned KQFN's sports radio format. KFNN's FM signal began using a new translator, K287BX on 105.3 MHz.

=== Business and financial format ===
Along with two other original partners, Ronald Cohen began the station's format with largely syndicated format from Bloomberg Radio and other radio networks. However, after several years, live, local programming began airing throughout the week. Don McDonald's financial planning program was one of the first major national shows broadcast on the station, along with Ken and Daria Dolan, who featured a money and investment related program syndicated from the WOR Radio Network.

KFNN introduced a local wake up show, Business for Breakfast. Ken Morgan was its original host. He had been a long time morning show host and station manager, with much of his career spent in Cleveland. Mark Asher is the current host. Other national business and money shows heard on KFNN included Clark Howard, Gary Kaltbaum and Ray Lucia.

In 2011, KFNN re-branded from "1510 KFNN, Financial Newsradio" to "Money Radio 1510 & 99.3 FM". The station's brand was changed to reflect the broader nature of program content that relates to all matters money. Some programs were also heard in the Palm Springs market on co-owned KPSF. In 2019, KFNN began adding some conservative and libertarian-leaning political talk, including Todd Schnitt, Chris Plante, Michael J. Knowles and Ben Shapiro. It airs Bloomberg Radio in the early morning, evenings and some weekend hours. Some paid brokered programming is also on the schedule. Most hours begin with an update from USA Radio News.

=== Change to Progressive Talk ===
KFNN and its translator were sold to Heartland Signal in 2026. After ten months off-air, KFNN began airing a simulcast of KTNF Minneapolis–Saint Paul, on September 5, 2026. On October 14, it began simulcasting WCPT.
