= KMVA =

Radio station in Gilbert, Arizona, United States

Coordinates: 33.247°N 111.531°W

- Gilbert, Arizona; United States
- Broadcast area: Phoenix metropolitan area
- Frequency: 103.9 MHz (HD Radio)
- Branding: Hot 103.9

Programming
- Format: Rhythmic hot AC
- Subchannels: HD2: 94.9 The Zone (AAA); HD3: KXEG simulcast (Spanish adult hits)

Ownership
- Owner: Zelus Media Group; (Zelus Esports, LLC)
- Sister stations: KKFR; KZON

History
- First air date: February 25, 1981
- Former call signs: KQEZ (1981–1993); KAZR (1993–1995); KBZR (1995–1997); KPTY (1997–2001); KEDJ (2001–2010); KEXX (2010–2016); KZON (2016–2026)
- Call sign meaning: MOViN' Arizona, from former brand at 97.5 MHz

Technical information
- Licensing authority: FCC
- Facility ID: 54944
- Class: C1
- ERP: 100,000 watts
- HAAT: 189 meters (620 ft)
- Translators: HD2: 94.9 K235CB (Chandler); HD3: 96.1 K241BQ (Fort McDowell)

Links
- Public license information: Public file; LMS
- Webcast: Listen live; HD2: Listen live
- Website: hot975hot1039.com; HD2: kzon.codeadx.me

KMVA (103.9 FM) is a commercial radio station licensed to Gilbert, Arizona, United States, and serving the Phoenix metropolitan area. It broadcasts a rhythmic hot AC radio format as "Hot 103.9". The station is owned by the Zelus Media Group with studios on 7th Street in Midtown Phoenix.

The transmitter is on East Ocotillo Road at North Schnepf Road in San Tan Valley, Arizona. KMVA is also heard on two FM translators: 94.9 MHz in Chandler and 96.1 MHz in Fort McDowell.

== History ==
=== Country (1981–1993) ===
The station signed on the air on February 25, 1981. Its original call sign was KQEZ. It called itself "Easy Country 103" and its city of license was Coolidge, Arizona. It was powered at only 3,000 watts, a fraction of its current output, so the station primarily focused on the Casa Grande Valley.

In 1991, original owner Larry E. Salsburey sold the station to Scott Christianson's Chriscom. KQEZ, however, fell on financial hard times in the early 1990s. In September 1992, KQEZ's disc jockeys informed listeners that they had not been paid in a month; at that time, owner Christianson said he could not pay workers because of $200,000 in debt. In April 1993, the station went off the air altogether.

=== Classic rock (1993–1995) ===
Two months later, the station was sold to J.M. Wolz, the first of three license transfers in a year. Wolz put the station back on the air with a classic rock format as KAZR. A signal upgrade followed providing the southern sections of the Phoenix area with a clear signal.

=== Rock/top 40 hybrid (1995–1996) ===
On March 20, 1995, the format was flipped to a modern rock/top 40 hybrid branded as "The Blaze". A change of call letters to KBZR followed the change of format.

=== Rhythmic oldies (1996) ===
In the spring of 1996, the station began moving its transmitter closer to Phoenix. At the same time, the station began a six-month stunt of an automated rhythmic oldies format, only going by the moniker "S.T.E.V.E." The name was an acronym standing for "Songs That Everyone Vociferously Enjoys".

=== Hip-hop (1996–2001) ===
On October 30, 1996, at 3:30 p.m., the station completed its upgrade, and the station once again began stunting, this time with people chanting "Party! Party! Party!" for several hours which ended with a sound of a record scratching and a male announcer saying "Arizona's Party Station" in reverse, which led to its new name and slogan, and the station flipped to a hip hop-emphasizing rhythmic top 40 format as "103.9, Arizona's Party Station". The call letters were changed in the spring of 1997 to KPTY to reflect the station branding. Despite the station's signal limitations, KPTY did well in the ratings. Rival KKFR, which was airing a broad-based mainstream top 40 format at the time, began to move towards hip hop-emphasizing rhythmic top 40 format as well, and took away much of KPTY's audience.

In 1998, KPTY evolved to a hybrid hip-hop/modern rock format shortly followed by a change of branding to "Party Radio @ 103.9". During the last week of 1999, KPTY stunted with a supposed broadcast hijacking with buzzing sounds and audio glitches in the songs, legal IDs and sweepers, while the DJs were talking. On December 31, 1999, KPTY began stunting with a 24-hour loop of "We Like To Party" by The Vengaboys. On January 1, 2000, KPTY returned to a rhythmic top 40 format (this time with more of a dance lean) as "103.9 The Party".

=== Alternative (2001–2012) ===
In October 2001, the station's owners were persuaded by the staff of the original KEDJ "The Edge" on 106.3 FM and 100.3 FM to drop the Rhythmic Top 40 format and bring the KEDJ call letters and its alternative rock format over to 103.9 FM. KPTY flipped to "The Edge" exactly five years after the station began: October 30, 2001, at Noon. The 106.3 and 100.3 frequencies originally used by "The Edge" were sold to Hispanic Broadcasting Corporation and switched to a Regional Mexican format.

In April 2008, the morning show "The Morning Ritual" was dropped in place of the syndicated Adam Carolla Show from Los Angeles. The Adam Carolla Show was cancelled on February 20, 2009, due to Carolla's flagship station KLSX flipping formats. It was quickly replaced by another Los Angeles–based morning show, Kevin and Bean.

In July 2009, the station relaunched as "FM/1039...Where Music Matters". FM/1039 launched under then-program director Tim Virgin. That same month, Virgin left to do afternoons at Q101 in Chicago. Former program director Marc Young returned to the station and took over afternoon duties as well.

On January 8, 2010, the "FM 103/9" branding was changed to "X 103-9...Alternative Rock Now". On February 2, 2010, under the direction of Program Director Marc Young, the station's call letters were changed from KEDJ to KEXX to align with the "X 103.9" branding.

=== Classic rock (2012) ===
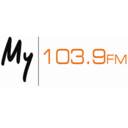
Logo as "My 103.9"

On January 12, 2012, at 6AM, the station shifted its alternative rock format for a hybrid mix that included classic rock artists, rebranding under the name "My 103.9". "Personal Jesus" by Depeche Mode was the last song under their alternative rock format; the first song under the readjusted format was "It's My Life" by Talk Talk.

=== Hot adult contemporary (2012–2022) ===
As of June 2012, the station shifted to a hot AC format, still under the name "My 103.9".

On December 27, 2013, Trumper Communications and Riviera Broadcasting Group announced that they would merge their Adult Top 40 outlets into one simulcast, with KMVA and KEXX becoming "Hot 97.5/103.9 Trending Radio". The combined signals made their launch at midnight on January 1; the last song as "My" was "This Love" by Maroon 5, and the first song under the "Hot" simulcast was "Blow Me (One Last Kiss)" by P!nk.

On April 9, 2015, its HD2 digital subchannel became the high definition simulcast of KOAI in Sun City West.

On June 20, 2016, KEXX changed its call letters to KZON, taking over the call sign from 101.5 FM which changed their callsign to KALV-FM earlier that month.

=== Rhythmic hot adult contemporary (2022-present) ===
On June 17, 2022, at noon, KZON and KMVA shifted to rhythmic hot AC, keeping the "Hot" branding and adopting the "Rhythm of the Valley" positioner, with the first song being "Hot in Herre" by Nelly.

On October 20, 2026, KZON rebranded as "Hot 103.9", as KMVA's sale to Good News Broadcasting Network was about to close. On November 4, KMVA assumed the call letters KGNN, giving the KMVA call letters to 103.9 FM. The KZON call letters now belong to 95.1 FM in Sun City West.

== HD Radio ==
Since 2017, KMVA-HD3 (then KZON-HD3) and K241BQ were a simulcast of KKFR, although this ended in October 2025 when the station began simulcasting Spanish adult hits KXEG instead, branded as "Xtasis 96.1".

On January 15, 2026, KZON-HD2 and K235CB dropped its long-time simulcast with KOAI and launched an adult album alternative format, branded as "94.9 The Zone".
