= KGNN =

Radio station in Dewey-Humboldt, Arizona

- Dewey-Humboldt, Arizona; United States
- Broadcast area: Phoenix metropolitan area
- Frequency: 97.5 MHz
- Branding: Good News Network

Programming
- Language: English
- Format: Christian talk and teaching

Ownership
- Owner: Good News Broadcasting Network, Inc

History
- First air date: January 5, 1988
- Former call signs: KENR (1985–1988); KVNA-FM (1988–2005); KZLB (5/2005-8/2005); KRZS (2005–2006); KMVA (2006–2026)
- Call sign meaning: Good News Network

Technical information
- Licensing authority: FCC
- Facility ID: 68566
- Class: C
- ERP: 42,000 watts
- HAAT: 849 meters (2,785 ft)
- Transmitter coordinates: 34.235°N 112.368°W

Links
- Public license information: Public file; LMS

KGNN (97.5 FM) is a non-commercial radio station licensed to Dewey-Humboldt, Arizona, United States, serving the Phoenix metropolitan area. Owned by Good News Broadcasting Network, the station broadcasts a Christian talk and teaching format.

KGNN's transmitter is on Tower Mountain Road in Crown King, Arizona.

== History ==
=== In Flagstaff ===
In 1985, Santa Rosa Broadcasting obtained a construction permit to build a new FM station at 97.5 in Flagstaff. The station signed on the air on January 5, 1988, as KENR with a soft adult contemporary format.

The station was acquired by The Voice of Northern Arizona Ltd., the owners of KVNA (600 AM). It was relaunched on January 15, 1988, as KVNA-FM, moving to a mainstream adult contemporary sound. By 1991, it had shifted to Top 40 - CHR, branded as "The Heat". Then a couple of years later, KVNA-FM switched to alternative rock.

The Park Lane Group bought KVNA-AM-FM in 1995. The FM station ended the alternative format and returned to AC as "Sunny 97". While some listeners lamented the change, Park Lane cited the lack of an AC station in the market for the move.

=== Move closer to Phoenix ===
Marathon Media, a company known for taking rural stations and moving them closer to larger metropolitan areas in order to sell them for a higher amount, purchased KVVA-FM in 2003. It got approval to move the station to a site between Phoenix and Prescott to cover the Phoenix metropolitan area. On January 1, 2005, in order to remain in Flagstaff, the "Sunny" format moved to 100.1 FM, which changed its call letters from KLOD to become the new KVNA-FM.

The new 97.5 facility, now with its tower closer to Phoenix, began broadcasting in April 2005. The new call sign was KZLB, calling itself "97.5 Latino Beat", featuring a mix of Spanish-language contemporary hits and reggaeton. The station was in the process of being sold at the time. KVIB (95.1 FM), a station broadcasting from the same location with an identical format, signed on the air just one month later, thus forcing KZLB off the air for three months. It returned to the airwaves in late August with a format mixing classic and more recently recorded adult standards and swing music. It was known on-air as "Star 97.5" with the KRZS call letters.

KRZS flipped to rhythmic AC as "MOViN' 97.5" at 5PM on October 27, 2006. The last song on Star 97.5 was "You Make Me Feel So Young" by Frank Sinatra, while the first song on Movin' 97.5 was "Bust a Move" by Young MC. A goodbye message on the website explained why the owners made the decision to switch formats, citing an inability grow the audience to sustainable levels. Throughout 2009, the station began adding various adult top 40 pop and rock songs, moving more into a hot AC direction but keeping some of the rhythmic material. During this period, the station aired the syndicated Elvis Duran and the Morning Show and On Air With Ryan Seacrest.

On November 24, 2010, KMVA temporarily dropped its Top 40 format and began playing all-Christmas music. In addition, all references to "MOViN'" were omitted, an indication that KMVA would flip to a new format after the Christmas holidays. On December 20, 2010, management revealed that at midnight on December 25, 2010, KMVA would officially become Hot 97.5, a contemporary hit radio station with a unique mix of Top 40 and Hot AC currents. The first three songs on "Hot" were "Raise Your Glass" by P!nk, "September" by Daughtry, and "Viva La Vida" by Coldplay. Both Elvis Duran and Ryan Seacrest's shows were retained at KMVA after the transition. The station was added again to Mediabase's contemporary hit radio panel as of July 2011.

=== Hot 97.5/103.9 ===
In early 2012, KMVA shifted its direction towards dance music. It added a new slogan, "The Hits and Dance Channel". It also dropped Elvis Duran for a music-driven morning show that same year. By 2013, the Dance product was phased out for more hot AC product, but remained within the Top 40/CHR realm. However, by the fall of 2013, KMVA returned to an adult top 40 direction.

On December 27, 2013, Trumper Communications and Riviera Broadcasting Group announced that they would merge their Adult Top 40 outlets into one simulcast, with KMVA and KEXX becoming "Hot 97.5/103.9 Trending Radio". The combined signals made their launch on December 31, 2013. On March 14, 2014, the sale of KMVA by Trumper Communications to Riviera Broadcasting was consummated at a price of $11,270,000.

On June 17, 2022, at noon, KMVA and KZON shifted to rhythmic hot AC, keeping the "Hot" branding and adopting the "Rhythm of the Valley" positioner. The first song was "Hot in Herre" by Nelly.

=== Religious programming ===
On October 20, 2026, KMVA and KZON rebranded as "Hot 103.9" in advance of KMVA's sale to Good News Broadcasting Network. Good News Broadcasting network closed on the sale on November 2, 2026, after which the religious format began. The KMVA call sign moved to 103.9 on November 10.
