= KXEG =

Radio station in Phoenix, Arizona

- Phoenix, Arizona; United States
- Broadcast area: Phoenix metropolitan area
- Frequency: 1280 kHz
- Branding: Xtasis 96.1

Programming
- Language: Spanish
- Format: Adult hits

Ownership
- Owner: Donald Brown; (KXEG AM LLC)

History
- First air date: October 23, 1956
- Former call signs: KHEP (1956–1999); KTKP (1999–2001)
- Call sign meaning: Formerly used by 1010 AM and derived from XEG-AM. KXEG 1010 and XEG were co-owned in the 1970s.

Technical information
- Licensing authority: FCC
- Facility ID: 10975
- Class: D
- Power: 2,500 watts (day); 49 watts (night)
- Transmitter coordinates: 33°29′36.9″N 112°08′21.2″W
- Translators: 96.1 K241CS (Phoenix); 96.1 K241BQ (Fort McDowell) (Note: Relayed by KMVA-HD3.)
- Repeater: 103.9 KMVA-HD3 (Gilbert)

Links
- Public license information: Public file; LMS
- Webcast: Listen live
- Website: radioxtasis.com

KXEG (1280 AM) is a radio station licensed to Phoenix, Arizona, United States, and broadcasts a Spanish adult hits format. The station is owned by KXEG AM LLC. The station is simulcast on FM translator 96.1 K241CS, also licensed to Phoenix. First put on the air on October 23, 1956, the station has also gone by the call letters KHEP and KTKP, and it was said to be Arizona's oldest Christian radio station until it fell silent in February 2019.

== History ==
In 2016, KXEG celebrated its 60th anniversary. The radio station—which has also gone by the call letters KHEP and KTKP—is believed to be the oldest Christian radio station in Arizona and has a very long history.

Phoenix's 1280 AM started out as KHEP, the area's first full-time country music station. Pronounced k-hep (“You ain’t hep if you don't listen to KHEP!” went the tagline), the station was launched on October 23, 1956, by Texas transplant Ray Odom, who went on to own several other stations in the area. "There was no country music in town, and people were just screaming for it," Odom told Phoenix magazine in 2014. The licensee was Bam Ray Broadcasting Company, which consisted of Odom and A.V. Bamford.

KHEP featured shows like "Hillbilly Hit Parade", "Cheyenne Kid", and "Mesa Mack". Largely because he frequently played Elvis songs, Odom's station quickly became one of Phoenix's most popular radio stations.

A year after its launch, Odom sold the station to Grand Canyon Broadcasters, a trio of evangelical businessmen who raised funds by selling stock to almost 500 Valley Christians. At that time, television had forced scores of religious radio programs off the air, and their aim was to start a wholly Christian radio station. John Hoeksema was recruited in 1957 to be the station's first general manager, and his wife Bea served as his executive secretary. The station's call letters were referred to as shorthand for "Keep Heralding Eternal Promises".

The station featured a mix of music and preaching, and early programs included "Gospel Echoes", "The Baptist Hour" with preacher Roy O. McClain of Atlanta, and "Streams in the Desert", as well as broadcasts of services from local churches like Eastside Church of the Nazarene and First Southern Baptist Church.

Bea Hoeksema also hosted a 25-minute women's ministry show called “Studio Bea” that featured music and interviews with local notables and visiting celebrities. "She interviewed the astronauts and vice presidents, anybody that was important that came to Phoenix," said Bea Hoeksema's daughter, Jan Aul. "She got to be very, very popular."

KHEP kept up with the times, producing programs like a special five-night series on communism in 1960, and another the next year on "The Christian Answer to Communism". It also aired shows with well-known preachers like Jerry Owen, healer Leroy Jenkins ("The man with the miracle arm"), and Oral Roberts.

The early years were tough financially as the station's owners learned the ropes of the radio business. There were only eight staff members, including two energetic salesmen.

In 1962, John Hoeksema died, and Jack Willis took over as general manager. Gradually, the station began to earn a profit and pay a small dividend to its shareholders, even as other Christian stations sprang up in the area. New music and talk programs included "The Reformation Hour", "Haven of Rest", and "High Noon Bible Class" with Rev. J. Vernon McGee of Los Angeles; the station offered news on the hour, courtesy of UPI’s audio service.

As the times changed, KHEP sought to remain relevant. In 1972, it aired a special program on “Solving the Drug Problem”; that year, it also began hosting a daily radio program, “Tips for Teens,” hosted by Rev. Mel Johnson. It also began offering community hymn sings at Encanto Park.

In 1977, KHEP celebrated its 20th anniversary. General manager Jack Willis—who also served as president of the Arizona Broadcasters' Association and vice president of the Western Religious Broadcasters Association—told the Arizona Republic, "We were one of the first Christian stations in the country to develop a complete range of programming, not just recorded ministries and gospel music. To the best of these, we added news, features and interviews, and blended them together to create a full spectrum of service for our listeners." During this period of time, KHEP and KXEG (1010 AM) were co-owned. The call sign KXEG was derived from sister station XEG-AM.

Jack Willis left in 1983 and was replaced by Herm Gebert; around that time, Grand Canyon Broadcasters changed its name to Christian Communications. In 1985, Arbitron ratings showed that the station failed to garner sufficient audience to even appear in the ratings. Soon after, it began to call itself "inspirational" rather than "religious", and sought to expand its signal in order to reach more people. New shows in the late 1980s included "Topic", hosted by KHEP program director Will Ray, "People to People", hosted by Bob George, and "Open Mike with Mike Lish" an Arizona centered interview program with guests such as John McCain and Evan Mecham.

By the 1990s, the station was struggling to find an audience, and began airing fishing programs, local sports games, a car repair show, and country music. In 1999, the station changed its call letters from KHEP to KTKP; simultaneously, Tom Brown, then the general manager, changed the station's format to include more conservative talk. The new programming included a morning show with Austin Hill, who discussed culture from a conservative perspective, and others with Trent Franks and Oliver North.

By the end of 1999, however, the format had not been particularly successful, and Tom Brown departed as general manager. Six months later, the station was sold by Christian Communications to Mortenson Broadcasting Co., a Christian broadcaster, for $1.7 million; Mortenson quickly sold it to James Crystal Enterprises for $2.3 million. Rex Collins, chairman of Christian Communications’ board, told the Arizona Republic that Phoenix's media climate was “too competitive, too challenging” for KTKP.

By the end of 2001, 1280 AM had become KXEG (previously on 1010), with Jess Spurgin as the general manager; religion was once again the core focus. In October 2005, the station was sold to Communicom Broadcasting for roughly $8.5 million.

In 2013, a heavy debt load and the lingering effects of the recession pushed Communicom into bankruptcy, and the courts forced a sale. On May 30, 2014, a group led by Jacob J. Barker purchased KXEG in a sale overseen by the court. In 2017, Barker became the sole owner. Under his aegis, the station was rebranded “The Trumpet” to reflect its complete focus on Christian teaching using talk programming, paralleling the prophetic use of this instrument in the Bible. It was also in 2017 when KXEG acquired FM translator station 96.1 K241CS, licensed to Phoenix and broadcasting from Shaw Butte. Barker operated the station until February 4, 2019, when the station abruptly shut down. A notification of suspension of operations was filed on March 5, 2019, with Barker citing loss of tower lease as reason for going silent. Sister station KFCS in Colorado Springs is still in operation, but previous management has taken over interim operations of that station.

On January 7, 2020, Maricopa County Superior Court Judge Timothy J. Thomason ordered that the station be placed into receivership of media broker Stephen Sloan and tasked him with preserving the assets of the radio station, returning it to air before the license expired, and preparing it for sale. The station was returned to air under special temporary authority (STA) using a long wire antenna from an alternate transmitter site on April 15, 2021, one day before the license was to expire. The STA allowed the station to operate daytime hours only at a power of 625 watts. The STA was later modified to allow the station to operate at a daytime power of 50 watts and at its licensed nighttime power of 49 watts in 2022. On September 25, 2023, the station entered a local marketing agreement with Donald Brown and started simulcasting the Spanish-language station KNNR "Radio Xtasis" from Sparks, Nevada (co-owned by Brown) over the KXEG airwaves.

In July 2024, Donald Brown (under the corporate name KXEG AM LLC) purchased KXEG and K241CS out of receivership, and continued to simulcast KNNR. In September of that year, KXEG soft-launched the MeTV Music format (originating from WRME-LD in Chicago) on the station. KXEG also started airing The TJ Show from United Stations Radio Networks in morning drive. In October, after only one month, KXEG dropped the MeTV Music affiliation with no official notice or explanation given to its listeners, and temporarily switched back to simulcasting KNNR. After one week, the station then started broadcasting a mostly-automated 1960s-1980s traditional oldies format with limited voicetracked personalities, only branding with its call letters. The TJ Show and John Tesh's Intelligence For Your Life were held over from the short-lived MeTV Music format. In November, the station adopted a new brand called "The Time Machine".

In January 2025, the station filed for a modification to the existing STA it was operating under. This new modification allows the station to operate at 1kw during the day and at 49 watts at night. In February, then-repeater KRPH from Morristown, Arizona, was sold to La Promize Company LLC and now simulcasts KNUV "La Onda" from Tolleson.

On September 1, 2025, KXEG switched back to a Spanish AC format, reviving the Radio Xtasis format in the Phoenix area. However, this station still has its own stream and its own local commercials. In October, the station began to be simulcast on 103.9 KZON-HD3, licensed to Gilbert and 96.1 K241BQ, licensed to Fort McDowell and broadcasting from South Mountain, giving the Xtasis format complete coverage over the Phoenix metropolitan area.
