= KOOL-FM =

Classic hits radio station in Phoenix

- Phoenix, Arizona; United States
- Broadcast area: Phoenix metropolitan area
- Frequency: 94.5 MHz (HD Radio)
- Branding: Big 94.5

Programming
- Language: English
- Format: Classic hits
- Subchannels: HD2: KWSS-LP simulcast (community radio)

Ownership
- Owner: Audacy, Inc.; (Audacy License, LLC)
- Sister stations: KALV-FM; KMLE

History
- First air date: 1956
- Call sign meaning: "Cool" (former branding)

Technical information
- Licensing authority: FCC
- Facility ID: 13506
- Class: C
- ERP: 100,000 watts
- HAAT: 504 meters (1,654 ft)
- Transmitter coordinates: 33.334°N 112.062°W

Links
- Public license information: Public file; LMS
- Webcast: Listen live (via Audacy)
- Website: www.audacy.com/big945phoenix

KOOL-FM (94.5 MHz branded Big 94.5) is a commercial classic hits radio station in Phoenix, Arizona, owned by Audacy, Inc. Big 94.5 features mostly hits of the 1970s, 1980s, and 1990s. KOOL-FM's studios are located in downtown Phoenix, and its transmitter is in South Mountain Park.

== History ==
KOOL-FM began programming oldies music in 1971, the first radio station ever to carry the format, as a format brought to the station by Jerry Osborne, who used the air name Dan Coffey. Since the station did not have an oldies library, Osborne supplied all of the music from his own collection. The Dan Coffey Show, which aired on Saturday and Sunday nights, from 6 p.m. to midnight, immediately became the most popular program on KOOL-FM – so much so that they hired a woman (Pam MacKenzie) whose only job it was to answer the flood of calls and music requests for the Dan Coffey Show. At the time, no other station in the Phoenix market had an oldies format, and Osborne was given the freedom by KOOL-FM (then owned by Gene Autry) to play anything he wanted.

Now the door to success was opened and by the end of 1971, the entire station followed. They switched to an all-oldies format. In 1975, Osborne left radio to start his own publishing company. Before he left, he recorded thousands of oldies for the KOOL-FM music library.

By about 1986, KOOL was playing a small amount of 1980s music as well. Still, they focused on the music of the late 1960s. More often, KOOL's schedule then was unique, despite the station airing mostly oldies, but KOOL aired Rick Dees Weekly Top 40 for a short time during early and the middle of 1984. The show was dropped that August due to low ratings according to The Arizona Republic. The station was co-owned with KOOL (960 AM). In December 1985, Adams Radio Group bought both KOOL-AM/FM from Tom Chauncey and Partners. As Adams radio took ownership, KOOL AM under the tutelage of GM Jim Seemiller changed format to a 1950s/1960s early rock and roll oldies format on January 7, 1987. The music had a concentration of the early hits but also injected a large dose of doo-wop. This new format caught on and not only became a ratings success but also syndicated itself 24 hours a day, the first radio station to do so. The stations were both owned by Adams Communications, and KOOL format was installed at many of other Adams radio stations.

KOOL with its marketing savvy became the leader of oldies in the US. KOOL had its own Radio store, a physical shop located in Phoenix with radio paraphernalia, records, music, and other oldies items and had a tremendous retail operation. At the same time, KOOL opened its own version of a real bar, KOOL CAFE. With the Cafe KOOL did music and live promotions every day of the week. The Cafe became one of Phoenix's hot spots for years. These marketing tactics paid off with the winning of the Marconi award in 1991/92.

In late 1995, KOOL-FM began simulcasting on KOOL AM, which stopped playing "older-leaning oldies".

In 1996, Chancellor acquired KOOL-AM-FM. At that time they acquired several other stations in the market, bringing them over their ownership limit of eight. KOOL AM went to Salem Communications in 1997, while KOOL-FM went to Infinity Broadcasting, later to become CBS Radio. The music continued to be about the same until about 1999. At that point more late 1970s songs were added while the pre-1964 oldies were cut back slightly. In 2001, some early 1980s music was added and the pre-1964 oldies were cut to about two per hour. By 2003, as was the case as the oldies format continued to evolve, the pre-1964 oldies were eliminated almost completely with a handful of exceptions. More 1980s titles were also added at that point. Today the station, like most oldies outlets, has more of a classic hits format than a true oldies format.

In February 2008, CBS Radio made major layoffs that sent many longtime personalities packing, including Bill Gardner, John Michaels, Camelback Jack (who will later return), Dave Shannon (who with Gardner were the oldest workers in the building and had just received a bonus check for great ratings), and several part-time personalities that had been with the station over the years, including Liz Boyle, Dennis Mitchell and Tony McGraw, a.k.a. "Skippy".

With the public release of Arbitron PPM data in July 2009, KOOL-FM continued to be one of the most listened-to stations in Phoenix with an airstaff anchored by 30-year market veterans Tom Peake and Steve Goddard along with the return of Camelback Jack at night and radio veteran Jeffrey T. Mason in middays.

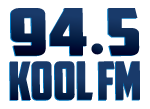
Kool 94.5 logo from 2013–2019

On February 2, 2017, CBS Radio announced it would merge with Entercom. The merger was approved on November 9, 2017, and was consummated on November 17.

On November 2, 2018, KOOL-FM switched to an all-Christmas music format, the only year it would do so; it returned to its regular format on December 26, 2018.

On September 28, 2022, at 10 am, after playing "I Want To Know What Love Is" by Foreigner, KOOL-FM began stunting with a loop of jingling sleigh bells and a voice like that of Santa Claus announcing "something special" was coming soon. At noon, the station relaunched as "Big 94.5", dropping the longtime branding by its call letters after 62 years, in a move mirroring a similar flip at cross-country sister station WOGL in Philadelphia done several months prior. The first song on "Big" was "Big Time" by Peter Gabriel.

== HD radio ==
KOOL's HD Radio signal is multiplexed. The main signal is a simulcast of KOOL's classic hits programming. The HD2 formerly carried ROQ of the '80s, a new wave/classic alternative format originating from KROQ-FM HD2 in Los Angeles. The HD3 formerly aired All 70s, a.k.a. Your '70's Playlist. The HD2 subchannel now carries a simulcast of KWSS-LP, which airs a community radio format.
