= KTAR =

KTAR may refer to:

- KTAR (AM), a radio station (620 AM) licensed to Phoenix, Arizona.
- KTAR-FM, a radio station (92.3 FM) licensed to Glendale, Arizona.
- KMVP-FM, a radio station (98.7 FM) licensed to Glendale, Arizona, which formerly used the call sign KTAR-FM.
- KPNX, a television station (channel 12) licensed to Mesa, Arizona, which used the call sign KTAR-TV until 1979.
- Kolej Tunku Abdul Rahman
