= KYOT =

Adult hits radio station in Phoenix

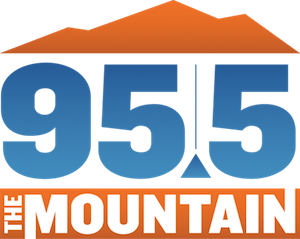
- Phoenix, Arizona; United States
- Frequency: 95.5 MHz (HD Radio)
- Branding: 95.5 The Mountain

Programming
- Format: Adult hits
- Subchannels: HD2: KFYI simulcast (news/talk); HD3: KNLB simulcast (Christian radio)

Ownership
- Owner: iHeartMedia; (iHM Licenses, LLC)
- Sister stations: KESZ; KFYI; KGME; KMXP; KNIX-FM; KOY; KZZP

History
- First air date: July 29, 1956
- Former call signs: KONI-FM (CP, 11/9/1955–11/28/1955); KELE (1955–1963); KRFM (1963–1978); KQYT (1978–1986); KOY-FM (1986–1993); KYOT-FM (1993–2018)
- Call sign meaning: Station identified as "The Coyote" in the 1990s

Technical information
- Licensing authority: FCC
- Facility ID: 18648
- Class: C
- ERP: 100,000 watts
- HAAT: 479 meters (1,572 ft)
- Transmitter coordinates: 33.335°N 112.062°W
- Translators: (92.9 MHz) K225CL (Wickenburg); HD3: 95.9 K240DC (Buckeye)

Links
- Public license information: Public file; LMS
- Webcast: Listen live (via iHeartRadio)
- Website: 955themountain.iheart.com

KYOT (95.5 FM) is a commercial adult hits music radio station located in Phoenix, Arizona, United States. Owned and operated by iHeartMedia, its studios are located in Phoenix near Sky Harbor Airport and its transmitter is in South Mountain Park. During the period when sister station 99.9 KEZ airs Christmas music, KYOT is the de facto station for KEZ's normal format, as the playlists are slightly adjusted to align with the KEZ audience.

Despite the station's call sign and former "The Coyote" branding (used from 1993 to 2011), there was no affiliation of any kind with the Arizona Coyotes, the former local National Hockey League team. (The KYOT call letters came before the original Winnipeg Jets moved to Phoenix and became the Coyotes in the late 1990s.)

== History ==
On July 29, 1956, at 6 p.m., KELE signed on the air as the second FM station in Phoenix, Arizona, joining KFCA, the radio station of Phoenix College, which began transmissions in 1951. The construction permit for the station, which bore the KONI-FM callsign for the first 19 days of its permit history in 1955, was owned by James T. Ownby; before signing on, Ownby sold the station to ANJO Broadcasters and Telecasters, which moved the station from the original 98.5 dial position to 95.5.

In 1962, KELE was sold to Camelback Broadcasting; the next year, after being off the air for several months, KELE became KRFM with an easy listening music format. Camelback promptly sold KRFM to Arizona FM.

Following an acquisition by Harte-Hanks, on January 15, 1978, the call letters were changed to KQYT, retaining its easy listening music format, branded as "Quiet 95“. On July 22, KQYT accidentally made a false alarm by accidentally playing the "White Card" Emergency Broadcast System Emergency Action Notification in the middle of their station ID, unlike WCCO in Minneapolis and WOWO in Fort Wayne, Indiana seven years prior.

On June 30, 1986, despite KQYT having outstanding ratings (but older-skewing, as many easy listening stations did), the station began stunting with an audio broadcast of CNN after a 30-second silence, broadcasting a news story involving the Soviet proposal having a special meeting with the nuclear weapons' control the response from the Reagan Administration, but was interrupted towards the end of the story with 12 more seconds of silence. The format was then changed to a simulcast of KOY's full-service middle of the road format, as a way to stem the tide of listeners moving to FM adult contemporary competitors like KKLT and KLZI. The call letters were changed to KOY-FM. The simulcast was not successful, and on July 8, 1987, KOY-FM split off with its own identity as an adult top 40, branded as "Y-95". The station later evolved to a top 40 music format. The station gained some national attention in the late 1980s when they hired Jessica Hahn, a central figure in the Jim Bakker PTL scandal, as an on-air DJ. The station also helped to start the careers of Arizona disk jockeys Tim Hattrick and Glenn Beck. The station competed heavily against KKFR and KZZP, and Phoenix was considered to be the best market for fans of Top 40. However, due to the changing nature of the format in the late 1980s and early 1990s in terms of musical tastes, personalities and personnel changes, KZZP flipped to the then-new hot AC format in April 1991, leaving KKFR and KOY-FM to battle for themselves. However, despite KOY-FM picking up a good percentage of KZZP's former audience, the station dropped in the ratings, well below KKFR, which moved towards a more upbeat, rhythmic direction to compete against KOY-FM's own rhythmic/dance direction. To combat this, in late 1992, KOY-FM began a "dayparting" approach, by playing more safe and mainstream pop/rock content during the day, and less mainstream hip hop/rock/dance product at night. However, a few months later, the station reverted to its previous sound. With all the changes, the station continued to deteriorate in the ratings.

On September 2, 1993, at noon, the station began stunting, airing loops of quotes from famous people and figures from American pop culture and history, branded as "America's Radio Museum". The following day, the station flipped to a "rhythm and rock" format (a predecessor to the latter-day adult hits format) branded as "The Coyote". A change of call letters to KYOT-FM followed to match its new branding.

On March 14, 1994, at 6:30 p.m., the format was changed to a successful smooth jazz format, but retaining its branding as "The Coyote", with actor Geoffrey Holder providing the station's voice-over during its tenure. Nick Francis, previously the program director of KKNW in Seattle and the music director of KKSF in San Francisco, programmed KYOT-FM to a ratings height of #1 12+ at one point in the late 1990s.

At the time it changed to smooth jazz, KYOT-FM was owned by Sundance Communications. Several ownership changes in the late 1990s would see KYOT-FM become a property of Colfax, Chancellor, AMFM, and eventually Clear Channel Communications (now iHeartMedia) in 2000.

Between 2000 and 2010, KYOT-FM maintained strong 12+ ratings, but eventually saw a similar aging of the audience that other smooth jazz stations experienced. Francis' role as program director was downsized, and the smooth jazz format of KYOT-FM never regained its dominance.

In 2010, the station began mixing some soft adult contemporary music into the mix, similar to what was being done at KTWV in Los Angeles. By January 2011, KYOT-FM was playing less smooth jazz and more AC-sounding pop/R&B recurrents and classic/old school pop and R&B songs. By that June, KYOT-FM officially moved to rhythmic adult contemporary, playing mostly rhythmic pop/R&B hits from the 1960s, 1970s, 1980s, 1990s and 2000s.

On August 31, 2011, KYOT-FM was rebranded as "Eva 95.5", first playing rhythmic oldies. By October 2013, KYOT-FM shifted back to a Rhythmic AC direction by adding current Rhythmic Pop and R&B material to its selection while maintaining a majority of older Rhythmic product.

On January 10, 2014, at 5 p.m., KYOT-FM changed their format to adult hits (filling the format void after KPKX flipped to sports earlier that week), branded as "95.5 The Mountain". The final song on "Eva" was "End of the Road" by Boyz II Men, while the first song on "The Mountain" was "You Give Love a Bad Name" by Bon Jovi.

The station modified its call sign to simply KYOT on September 18, 2018.

== HD radio ==
KYOT's HD radio signal is multiplexed. HD1 is a simulcast of The Mountain's adult hits format. HD2 carries the format of sister station KFYI 550 AM. The HD3 is leased out to KNLB in Lake Havasu City to feed translator K240DC 95.9.
