= KGME =

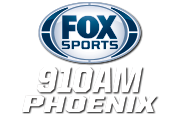
- Phoenix, Arizona; United States
- Broadcast area: Phoenix metropolitan area
- Frequency: 910 kHz
- Branding: Fox Sports 910

Programming
- Format: Sports radio
- Affiliations: Fox Sports Radio; Westwood One Sports

Ownership
- Owner: iHeartMedia; (iHM Licenses, LLC)
- Sister stations: KESZ; KFYI; KMXP; KNIX-FM; KOY; KYOT; KZZP

History
- First air date: October 26, 1940
- Former call signs: KPHO (1940–1972); KJJJ (1972–1985); KFYI (1985–2000)
- Former frequencies: 1200 kHz (1940–1941); 1230 kHz (1941–1949)
- Call sign meaning: "Game"

Technical information
- Licensing authority: FCC
- Facility ID: 65480
- Class: B
- Power: 5,000 watts
- Transmitter coordinates: 33°32′0.1″N 112°7′20.5″W
- Repeater: 99.9 KESZ-HD3 (Phoenix)

Links
- Public license information: Public file; LMS
- Webcast: Listen live (via iHeartRadio)
- Website: foxsports910.iheart.com

KGME (910 AM) is a commercial radio station in Phoenix, Arizona, United States, featuring a sports format known as "Fox Sports 910". Owned by iHeartMedia, the station's studios are located in Phoenix near Sky Harbor International Airport, and broadcasts with 5,000 watts—directional at night—from a transmitter site at the intersection of 30th and Maryland Avenues in north Phoenix. In addition to a standard analog transmission, KGME is relayed over the third HD Radio subchannel of KESZ and is available online via iHeartRadio.

KGME is the third-oldest radio station in Phoenix. It began broadcasting in October 1940 at 1200 kHz (soon reassigned to 1230) as KPHO, the first new station on air in the Valley since KOY and KTAR, both built in the early 1920s. Founded by local insurance salesman M. C. Reese, the station grew with its sale to Phoenix Broadcasting, Inc., in 1943; for several years after the sale, Gene Autry was a minority owner. KPHO became the affiliate of the Blue Network, later ABC, in 1944; moved to 910 kHz and increased power in September 1949; and launched KPHO-TV, the first television station in Arizona, that December. From 1952 to 1972, KPHO was owned by the Meredith Corporation; by the end of Meredith ownership, KPHO was a news-intensive station.

After the transaction was delayed by protests and complications, Meredith sold KPHO to Dairyland Associates in 1972. The call letters were changed to KJJJ and the format to country music. KJJJ was one of the Valley's leading stations in the 1970s, though its fortunes declined under several owners in the late 1970s and early 1980s as music listening shifted away from AM and KNIX-FM became the market leader for country music. As a result, in 1985, owners The Broadcast Group changed the format to news/talk as KFYI. The station established itself as the second-rated talk outlet in the market behind KTAR and was a stop in the careers of several notable hosts, including Tom Leykis.

KFYI was sold twice in rapid succession in 1998 and 2000. The second sale, to iHeartMedia forerunner Clear Channel Communications, saw the KFYI format and call sign move to 550 kHz, longtime home of KOY, while KGME's sports talk programming migrated to 910. An affiliate of iHeart-owned Fox Sports Radio, the station also airs several local talk shows and is the current home of Arizona State Sun Devils men's ice hockey. However, with the intermittent exception of the Arizona Coyotes, most of Phoenix's major sports franchises continue to be heard on KMVP-FM and/or KTAR.

== KPHO ==
=== Establishment ===
Phoenix businessman M. C. Reese, with decades of experience in the insurance industry, applied to the Federal Communications Commission (FCC) on June 30, 1938, for permission to build a new radio station on the local channel of 1500 kHz in Phoenix, soon amended to specify 1200 kHz instead. The FCC designated Reese's application for a hearing, initially concerned that granting the station would not be in the public interest, but granted it on January 25, 1940, later also turning down petitions to deny the grant from Phoenix's two existing radio stations, KOY and KTAR.

From studios at the corner of 24th Avenue and Buckeye Road, KPHO began broadcasting on October 26, 1940, ramping up to a full 20-hour daily schedule of broadcasting and without the use of any network programs. It was the third station for Phoenix, after KOY and KTAR (both built in the early 1920s), and was one of three newly built radio stations in the state during the year. KPHO, which broadcast hourly news summaries, was also responsible for bringing to Arizona the International News Service newswire, which was shared with KTAR and The Arizona Republic. Five months after going on the air, KPHO moved from 1200 to 1230 kHz as part of NARBA reallocation on March 29, 1941.

After slightly less than three years of ownership, Reese agreed to sell KPHO to Phoenix Broadcasting, Inc., for $60,000 in August 1943. The firm consisted of a number of local and out-of-state investors; its president, Rex Schepp, was affiliated with station WIRE in Indianapolis, and movie star Gene Autry was a minority shareholder. The deal received FCC approval and closed in January 1944. That August, KPHO joined the Blue Network (renamed ABC in 1945); the Blue Network had previously shared KTAR with the NBC Red Network, from which it had split. The result was that a number of Blue programs not previously heard in Phoenix were added to KPHO's lineup. Additionally, two Blue Network vice presidents were minority stockholders in Phoenix Broadcasting. The next month, it opened studios in the Hotel Adams. Schepp became the majority owner in 1945.

=== After the war: frequency change and television expansion ===
KPHO applied in 1946 to shift frequencies to 1030 kHz (amended the next year to 910 kHz), where it could increase power from 250 watts to ultimately 5,000. During this time, Phoenix gained another radio station, KOOL (960 AM), which proved to be highly relevant to changes taking place at KPHO. The station went on the air with 5,000 watts in June 1947 from studios in the Hotel Adams, and Autry opted to sell his minority stake at KPHO to buy KOOL. In Tucson, Autry and Charles Garland, who had been KPHO's general manager, owned station KOPO. Meanwhile, a second Phoenix-area radio station, KRUX (1340 AM), also sought the 910 kHz frequency, as did two other applicants proposing entirely new stations; all four applications were placed into comparative hearing.

KPHO emerged successful from the hearing in April 1949, winning the right to move to 910; a principal reason for KRUX losing was that it was licensed to Glendale and sought to relocate to Phoenix. The new frequency and facility were activated on September 21, 1949, at 9:10 p.m. The 1230 plant was sold to start a new station, KRIZ, which was approved in 1950.

Also in 1949, Schepp bought a stake in Phoenix Television, Inc., a company that held the first-ever construction permit issued for a television station in the state, KTLX. One of KTLX's owners, oil tycoon John B. Mills, then bought 29 percent of KPHO. KTLX changed its call sign to KPHO-TV on October 4 and began broadcasting on December 4 as the state's first TV station.

=== Meredith ownership ===
KPHO radio and television were sold in 1952 for $1.4 million to the Meredith Corporation of Des Moines, Iowa, whose only broadcast holdings at the time consisted of WHEN-TV in Syracuse, New York, and WOW radio and WOW-TV in Omaha, Nebraska. Loretta Young and Irene Dunne were reported to be interested in the months leading up to the sale, offering $1.25 million, but the owners of KPHO were looking for $2 million at the time, only lowering their price because of the impending arrival of new TV stations into a market they had monopolized since going on the air.

Over the course of the 1960s, KPHO gradually morphed into a news-intensive radio station. Evening news programming, begun in 1961, expanded to morning and afternoon drive. The format shift was completed in April 1970 when KPHO changed to an all-news format during the day, as well as talk shows with Pat McMahon and Earl Baldwin at night. However, KPHO became one of the smallest all-news stations by market size in the United States. Even though the local manager contended it was making money, Meredith corporate disagreed about its prospects. In July 1971, the company announced the sale of the station for $1.5 million to Dairyland Associates, a company based in Madison, Wisconsin. The sale included the building in which the radio and TV stations were presently located, as KPHO-TV was building new studios on Black Canyon Highway; despite this, the radio station moved along with KPHO-TV to the building upon completion and would remain there until the sale was completed. Dairyland announced that Ray Odom, who owned KHAT (1480 AM), would serve as the station's manager after the sale.

Dairyland's other announcement as to the future of KPHO attracted enough opposition to delay the sale for months: it sought to drop the all-news format and convert to country. Odom had an extensive background in country music; in the mid-1950s, he had put KHEP on the air as the Valley's first country music station, launching country-formatted KMOP in Tucson before returning to Phoenix to start KHAT. The Arizona Democratic Party objected to the loss of a local news source, while Odom had to sell KHAT. He reached a deal with a consortium known as Pioneer Broadcasting Company of Arizona to acquire that station, which would change to all-news programming. However, that application fell through in March 1972 when the company's primary owner, KHAT DJ William P. Ledbetter (known as the "Platter Parson"), acknowledged he had submitted falsified paperwork to the FCC. He had submitted a notarized list of 110 people whom he claimed had pledged to lend $1,000 to finance the purchase; The Arizona Republic contacted 30 of them, none of whom reported ever having made such a pledge. As a result, Odom withdrew his application to sell KHAT. In addition to the Democratic Party petition to deny, the failure of this transaction delayed approval of the KPHO sale because Odom had to sell his interest in KHAT to manage KPHO.

The logjam was resolved in June 1972, when Odom found another buyer for KHAT: Marvin Himelstein, who pledged to run the station with an all-news format. At the same time, the Arizona Democratic Party withdrew its opposition to the KPHO sale. The FCC approved the sale in September 1972.

== KJJJ ==
With the sale, on October 4, 1972, KPHO gave way to KJJJ, which temporarily remained at the KPHO-TV studios until remodeling on the downtown site was completed. At the same time, several of the newsmen and on-air personalities from the all-news KPHO moved to KHAT, which took on the call letters KPHX.

Dairyland sold KJJJ to ITC Communications of Arizona in 1977. The buyer was a subsidiary of International Tapetronics Corporation, an Illinois-based manufacturer of tape machines and audio cartridges. Nearly immediately after closing the sale, ITC purchased Glendale-licensed KXTC (92.3 FM). That station had a disco format until March 1980, when it became a country music outlet. KXTC became KJJJ-FM in April 1981.

They go through people like water. It's almost like every two weeks you can expect someone to be fired.

— Bobby Butler, KJJJ morning host, on his firing in 1981

The KJJJ stations were purchased for $6 million in January 1982 by Communications Group Inc. (also The Broadcast Group Inc.), a company of Walter Wolpin and Frederic Weber, whose only other radio property was WCAR in Detroit. The sale came as ITC divested itself of several non-core businesses. Additionally, the stations were struggling at the time. Ratings plummeted, and what once had been one of the top 10 radio stations in Phoenix was quickly declining. KJJJ's share of the metro Phoenix market fell from 6.7 percent in 1976 to 2.3 percent in 1981, and it would sink to 0.8 percent by 1985. Bud Wilkinson, media columnist for The Republic, ascribed the stations' woes to high turnover and competition from KNIX-FM; while AM stations were also losing ground, KJJJ-FM was not performing well, either. The FM was rebranded KEZC "EZ Country" in October 1982, only to revert to KJJJ-FM in 1984 as part of a major revamp of both stations including a morning show simulcast on AM and FM.

== KFYI ==
With KJJJ reaching new lows in the local ratings, rumors began to circulate by May 1985 that the station would convert to a news/talk format, beginning with the hiring of a sports director and addition of a nightly sports talk show to KJJJ's lineup. These rumors were bolstered by reports of conversations with former employees at KTAR, the market's heritage news/talk outlet, and the sighting of Phoenix TV weatherman Dewey Hopper at the studios. Furthermore, KJJJ had slowly built a second-tier portfolio of sports rights; beyond the sports talk show, the station carried the Arizona Outlaws of the United States Football League and obtained the rights to Arizona Wildcats sports from KOY.

After a brief transition period, the format change became official in early July. Renamed KFYI (standing for "for your information"), the new call sign was obtained for approximately $5,000 from its previous user, a station in Oakland, California, that left the air earlier in the year amid financial problems. In addition to Hopper and Moynihan, KFYI also featured a morning show with longtime radio DJ and television voiceover announcer Charlie Van Dyke. The format was a ratings improvement for the station immediately, and KFYI also incubated some hosts that went on to larger markets, including Tom Leykis, who abruptly left WNWS in Miami to work at KFYI months after the station debuted; he gave no notice to his old station, where he feared being cut as the result of an impending merger with another station. He left in 1988, amid a dispute with management, for KFI in Los Angeles but returned via syndication in 1994.

During the 1990s, KFYI's talk lineup shifted in a conservative direction. The Rush Limbaugh Show began airing on the station in 1991, and the station built its lineup around Limbaugh and similarly conservative local hosts. Through the decade, KFYI established itself as Phoenix's number-two talk station with credible ratings, though it never quite surpassed KTAR.

Chancellor Media filed to buy KFYI and KKFR (the former KJJJ-FM) in 1998 from The Broadcast Group for $90 million. Chancellor assumed operational control in November 1998 under a local marketing agreement while the sale process was completed. Clancy Woods, who was hired to run KFYI, found the station "underdeveloped" and made changes to broaden its appeal beyond conservatives. He hired the moderate Grant Woods, who had recently left his position as state attorney general, to host a daily talk show, and other program changes were made. The addition of University of Arizona football back to the lineup marked the first time since the station began airing Limbaugh that it committed to sports broadcasts, having previously positioned itself as the antithesis to sports-heavy KTAR.

While KFYI was being overhauled, Chancellor sold KGME (1360 AM) "The Game", a sports talk station, to Salem Communications. As KNNS, that station had adopted its sports radio format in 1993, shifting from talk; its lineup of program hosts included Mike Golic and Bruce Jacobs. Its programming and call sign then moved to the 550 frequency, with KOY and its nostalgia format replacing classic country KISO at 1230 AM. Chancellor then merged with Capstar Communications later in the year and changed its name to AMFM, Inc.

== KGME ==
Later that year, Clear Channel Communications, predecessor to iHeartMedia, merged with AMFM. Clear Channel opted to sell four of AMFM's FM stations in Phoenix and retain all of its local AMs, including KGME at 550 and KFYI at 910. When the deal closed in September 2000, Clear Channel immediately moved to swap KFYI and KGME, moving the talk station to 550 and sports to 910. KGME's existing programming remained unchanged, but Clear Channel rebranded the station as Xtra Sports 910, using a moniker that had originated at XETRA serving San Diego and was also being used elsewhere by Clear Channel. Dan Bickley, a columnist for The Republic, hosted mornings on KGME with Mike Jurecki from 2001 to 2013, when he left to join KTAR. Jurecki remained until 2017, when he was dismissed and joined KMVP-FM.

On June 11, 2013, KGME rebranded as "Fox Sports 910". Dan Sileo served as a host on the station for one week in 2019, after which he was removed. A report in The Athletic indicated that the Arizona Coyotes, which had recently signed an agreement to move their games to KGME, objected to Sileo's on-air presence based on racist and sexist comments he had previously made at stations in Florida that led him to be fired three times in a span of 20 months. From 2019 to 2024, the station aired Roc & Manuch, featuring former NFL quarterback Dan Manucci; that program moved to KTAR AM at the end of 2024.

== Programming ==
The station clears most of the national Fox Sports Radio schedule, with the exception of The Dan Patrick Show, which is replaced with the You Better You Bet show from Westwood One Sports. KGME also airs a handful of local brokered specialty shows on Saturdays and Sundays.

KGME has not been able to consistently lure away professional teams from their contracts with Bonneville International's cluster, including sports talk leader KMVP-FM. The Arizona Coyotes, largely because of their comparatively low priority to other teams carried by KMVP-FM, were an intermittent exception. Their games moved to KGME in 2019; the team cited the fact that only 21 minutes a week was spent on the team in KMVP-FM's various local sports talk shows. The agreement lasted two years before the Coyotes opted to return to KMVP-FM. While the rights to major Arizona State Sun Devils sports belong to Bonneville, KGME became the home of ASU men's hockey beginning in 2022, the team's first radio deal.

From 2013 to 2020, Fox Sports 910 was the Phoenix affiliate for the University of Arizona Wildcats football and men's basketball radio network. This deal ended in 2020, when the rights moved to KFNX (1100 AM).
