= KFYI =

Radio station in Phoenix, Arizona

- Phoenix, Arizona; United States
- Broadcast area: Phoenix metropolitan area
- Frequency: 550 kHz
- Branding: News/Talk 550 KFYI

Programming
- Format: Talk radio
- Affiliations: Fox News Radio; Premiere Networks; Radio America; KSAZ-TV

Ownership
- Owner: iHeartMedia; (iHM Licenses, LLC)
- Sister stations: KESZ; KGME; KMXP; KNIX-FM; KOY; KYOT; KZZP

History
- First air date: September 6, 1922
- Former call signs: KFCB (1922–1929); KOY (1929–1999); KGME (1999–2000)
- Former frequencies: 833 kHz (1922–1923); 1280 kHz (1923); 1080 kHz (1923–1924); 1260 kHz (1924–1927); 1230 kHz (1927–1928); 1310 kHz (1928–1929); 1390 kHz (1929–1940)
- Call sign meaning: "For your information"

Technical information
- Licensing authority: FCC
- Facility ID: 63918
- Class: B
- Power: 5,000 watts (day); 1,000 watts (night)
- Transmitter coordinates: 33°23′16″N 112°0′24″W
- Repeater: 95.5 KYOT-HD2 (Phoenix)

Links
- Public license information: Public file; LMS
- Webcast: Listen live (via iHeartRadio)
- Website: kfyi.iheart.com

KFYI (550 AM) is a commercial radio station licensed to serve Phoenix, Arizona, United States, featuring a talk radio format. Owned by iHeartMedia, KFYI serves the Phoenix metropolitan area as the market affiliate for Fox News Radio, The Clay Travis and Buck Sexton Show, The Sean Hannity Show, the Glenn Beck Radio Program and Coast to Coast AM.

Established as KFCB in 1922 by Earl A. Nielsen after a year of experimental broadcasting, this station adopted the KOY call sign in 1929. Sold to interests controlled by the Prairie Farmer/WLS in 1936, KOY was the Phoenix outlet for CBS radio in the 1930s and 1940s as well as an early home for Steve Allen and Jack Williams, the latter a part of the station from 1929 until his election to Arizona governor in 1966.

Throughout the 1970s and 1980s, KOY featured a popular adult contemporary format headlined by Bill Heywood, but declining ratings resulted in a 1988 flip to satellite-fed adult standards. As a result of mass consolidation, KOY's call letters and standards format were moved in 1999 to 1230 AM, with 550 AM assuming the KGME call sign and sports format. Since 2000, this station has featured the KFYI calls and talk format—which had previously originated on 910 AM—after a second intellectual property swap.

Studios for KFYI are located near 48th and Van Buren streets, near Sky Harbor Airport, and the transmitter is located on South 36th Street near East Vineyard Road in Phoenix. In addition to a standard analog transmission, KFYI is simulcast over the second HD subchannel of KYOT (95.5 FM) and streams online via iHeartRadio.

== History ==
=== Early years ===
KFYI was first licensed as a broadcasting station, with the call sign KFCB, on September 6, 1922. However, the station's history includes earlier broadcasting experimentation by the station's founder, Earl A. Nielsen, and the station has claimed a 1921 start date on several occasions. (Note: Among the most notable is a time capsule that was buried at the KOY studios in a 1977 renovation, which listed a start date of December 20, 1921.)

From 1912 to 1927, radio communication in the United States was regulated by the Department of Commerce, and originally there were no formal requirements for stations, most of which operated under amateur and experimental licenses, making broadcasts intended for the general public. In order to provide a common standard, the department issued a regulation effective December 1, 1921 requiring that broadcasting stations would now have to hold a Limited Commercial license that authorized operation on two designated broadcasting wavelengths: 360 meters (833 kHz) for "entertainment", and 485 meters (619 kHz) for "market and weather reports". The first two Phoenix broadcasting station authorizations were issued to Smith Hughes & Company for KDYW on May 15, 1922, (Note: Some newspaper sources as early as 1936 claim that KDYW was a predecessor to KFCB. However, contemporary Department of Commerce records, as well as most station reviews, state that KDYW and KFCB were separate, unrelated stations.) and McArthur Brothers Mercantile Company for KFAD (now KTAR) on June 21, 1922, both for 360 meters.

=== KFCB ===
In 1921, Earl A. Nielsen, a native of Kansas City, Missouri, received a license for an amateur station, with the call sign 6BBH, located at 115 South 21st Avenue in Phoenix. The Nielsen Radio Supply Company was incorporated in 1922 to purchase and distribute radios in Phoenix. The Department of Commerce's December 1, 1921, broadcasting regulations barred amateur stations from making broadcasts intended for the general public. Despite this, it was reported that on May 23, 1922, the Nielsen company, operating on the standard amateur radio wavelength of 200 meters (1500 kHz), had conducted what were described as the "first broadcasting tests in the Salt River Valley".

On September 6, 1922, the Nielsen Radio Supply Company was granted a broadcasting license with the call letters KFCB, for operation on 360 meters. This call sign was issued randomly from an alphabetical roster of available call letters. Because at this time only the single entertainment broadcasting wavelength of 360 meters was available, stations in a given region were encouraged to devise time-sharing agreements. In April 1923, KFCB's time slots were 7 to 8 p.m. on Monday, Wednesday, and Friday. KDYW shut down in early 1924, leaving KFAD and KFCB as the only stations in the state capital. There were several frequency changes in the early years. KFCB was deleted in mid-1923 but quickly relicensed on 1280 kHz, which was changed to 1080 kHz later in the year. In 1924, KFCB was moved to 1260 kHz, which was followed by a reassignment to 1230 kHz on June 1, 1927, with 125 watts.

In the fall of 1927, Nielsen opened new studios at Pierce Street and Central Avenue; the $70,000 ($1.3 million in 2025 dollars) building also housed the company's sporting goods division and contained a basement with eight bowling lanes. On November 11, 1928, KFCB was initially assigned to a "local" frequency, 1310 kHz, as part of the Federal Radio Commission's implementation of General Order 40, a national radio reallocation. This was soon changed to a "regional" frequency, 1390 kHz.

=== KOY ===
On February 8, 1929, KFCB changed its call sign to KOY; the new call sign began to be used on March 16, when the station was rebuilt and began broadcasting with 500 watts. This power level was increased again to 1,000 watts during daylight hours in 1933.

==== Salt River Valley Broadcasting Company ownership ====
In 1936, Nielsen—whose radio and sporting goods businesses both suffered during the Great Depression—sold KOY to the newly formed Salt River Broadcasting Company, owned by WLS radio in Chicago and the Prairie Farmer and headed by Burridge Butler. (Nielsen later moved to Hawaii, where he managed Hilo station KHBC and served as a territorial legislator; he died in 1966.) At the time, KOY was a station in need of major repair: the station's antenna had fallen, hanging over Central Avenue, and the station had "gone broke twice and was floundering". Major changes followed, including a new transmitter and new facilities just outside the city limits in the 800 block of North Central Avenue. On March 1, 1937, KOY joined CBS, marking its second time with that network after a five-month stint in 1932, and several days later, it began using a new transmitter site at 12th Street and Camelback Road. In September 1937, KOY established the Arizona Network with Tucson's KGAR (which became KTUC) and KSUN in Bisbee. Burridge Butler's ownership strongly emphasized community involvement and service, in some cases copying successful WLS features as the Christmas Neighbors Club and its country music-oriented Dinnerbell program. A donation from Butler established the first two Boys Clubs in Phoenix, and a settlement of his estate led to the creation of a third, named in Butler's honor.

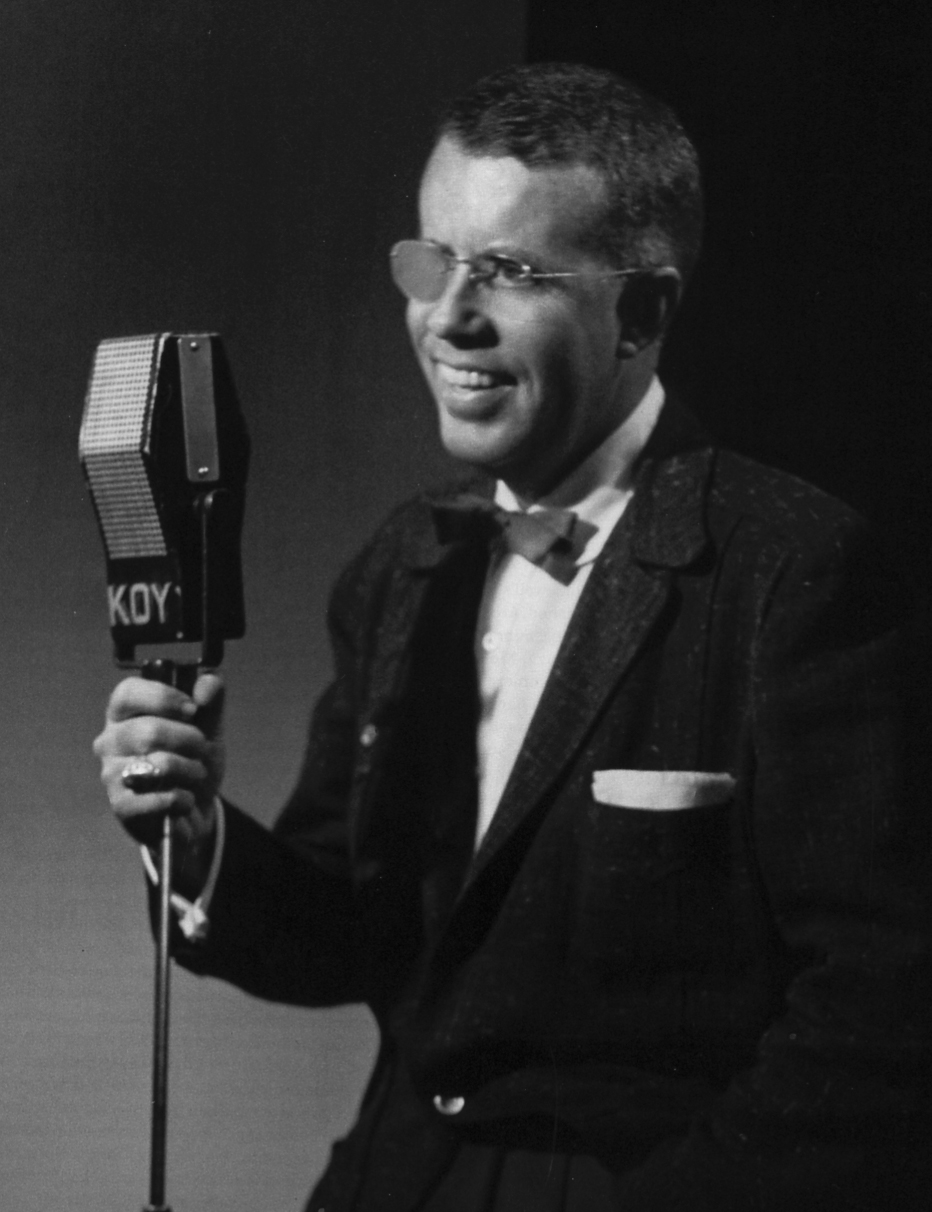
Jack Williams, later mayor of Phoenix and governor of Arizona, was KOY's longtime program director.

In 1938, KOY applied to move from 1390 to 550 kHz, which was approved by the Federal Communications Commission (FCC) on March 13, 1940, over the objections of KOAC in Corvallis, Oregon; the station made the move on April 7. A further power increase to 5,000 watts was initially granted in December 1941, but World War II postponed KOY's plans to make the change until 1948. Burridge Butler did not live to see the frequency change carried out; he died in April 1948, with ownership of KOY given to three company executives, per his will; one of these was program director John R. "Jack" Williams. Williams had already been a KOY veteran by this time, having been interviewed by founder Nielsen and hired on the same day in 1929, when Williams was a 20-year-old college student; he was appointed program director when the Butler ownership took over in 1936. Among Williams's hires was Steve Allen, who began his broadcasting career at KOY in 1942 before moving to Los Angeles. In a 1992 book, Allen called his years at KOY "pleasant ones and extremely educational".

KOY lost its CBS affiliation on January 1, 1950, to KOOL (960 AM), which went on the air in 1947; Gene Autry was one of the principal owners of KOOL, and his deep ties to CBS and Columbia Records helped seal the deal. In exchange, KOY picked up the Mutual–Don Lee hookup previously held by KOOL.

In 1952, KOY filed for a television station on channel 10; in competition with a similar bid from KOOL, and wanting to spare years of comparative hearings, the two parties agreed to a time-sharing proposal. On October 24, 1953, KOY-TV and KOOL-TV signed on, sharing time and studio and transmitter facilities on channel 10. After five months, KOY sold its interest to KOOL, which took over full operation of the venture; two months later, KOY-TV was no more.

Jack Williams's popularity on the air was also evident. In addition to his duties as program director and announcer, he forged close political ties with others. From 1945 to 1948, he read the State of the State address for governor Sidney Preston Osborn, who suffered from multiple sclerosis, and in 1952, he was appointed to fill a term on the Phoenix City Council. His KOY career was considered the springboard to his political career, which included terms as Mayor of Phoenix and Governor of Arizona. Even while mayor, he continued to host his program on KOY and only stepped aside from his duties at the station in 1965, when he prepared his first gubernatorial campaign.

==== The 1960s, 70s and 80s ====
In 1964, the sale of KOY to a Pennsylvania real estate firm, Cote Realty, was announced; the deal never went through because of excessive signal overlap with KTUC in Tucson, which Cote already owned. In 1967, KOY was instead sold to the Southern Broadcasting Company of Winston-Salem, North Carolina, for $2 million. Southern filed to move the transmitter to its present site at the end of 1967 and sold the Camelback land to the Coulter car dealership group. Gary Edens became KOY's general manager in 1970 and helped bring Williams back to a part-time role at the station, hosting a taped version of his previous Yours Sincerely program, which would not discuss state government issues. In 1973, Southern bought KRFM (95.5 FM), a beautiful music station; however, the two would operate from separate premises until August 1984.

Also in 1973, KOY brought in a host who would have a long run on the station. A format change at KTAR had cost Bill Heywood, that station's morning man, his job. He moved to Las Vegas, but Edens wanted him for his station, which happened to have an opening in morning drive. Edens flew to Las Vegas and went to Heywood's house in a successful bid to lure him back to Phoenix. Heywood grew to be one of the market's most popular radio hosts, being honored in 1975 as "Grand International Air Personality", the top individual honor of the International Radio Programming Forum, and pulled as much as 13 percent of the morning audience. The station supplemented its middle-of-the road format, which evolved into adult contemporary, with Heywood and sports. In 1983 and 1984, KOY was the broadcast home of the Arizona Wranglers of the United States Football League, though it lost money carrying the nascent team's games.

Southern Broadcasting merged with Harte-Hanks in 1978. Three years later, Edens was appointed president of the company's broadcast division, which was renamed Harte-Hanks Radio and relocated its corporate headquarters from Winston-Salem to Phoenix. When Harte-Hanks went private in a leveraged buyout in 1984, the company sought to shed its radio properties, and Edens purchased all nine of its stations—including KOY and the sister FM (then called KQYT)—for $40 million, forming Edens Broadcasting.

==== Decline and standards format ====
On July 1, 1986, Edens Broadcasting ended KQYT's long-running beautiful music format and launched KOY-FM, which simulcast the AM station's talk-heavy adult contemporary during the day and aired music at night while the AM station continued with talk shows. However, even with the FM added in an attempt to capture music listeners who had moved away from AM, ratings were falling, and Heywood's popularity diminished. KOY-FM split off as an adult top 40 station under the "Y-95" moniker in July 1987, with AM and FM only sharing Bill Heywood's morning show. The next month, Heywood departed, citing the incompatibility of the Y-95 format and his program; he then was hired by KTAR in January 1988.

In a cost-cutting move, in November 1988, Edens fired 12 employees and dropped KOY's music-and-talk format for the satellite-delivered AM Only format of adult standards music; Edens felt that what would have been the natural evolution of KOY, to a talk format competing with KTAR and KFYI (910 AM), would have taken too long, and that the move would allow the company to focus on KOY-FM. Gary Edens later cited that moment as the death of the "legendary KOY". Sundance Broadcasting acquired the Edens Phoenix stations in 1993, creating a four-station cluster with KOY, 95.5 (which was relaunched as "rhythm and rock" KYOT), KZON (101.5 FM), and KISO (1230 AM). Radio deregulation in 1996 brought more acquisitions in short order: Sundance sold its Phoenix cluster and five other stations in Milwaukee and Boise to Colfax Communications for $95 million, and before that deal had even closed, Colfax sold those four and KOOL-FM to Chancellor Media, plus seven stations in other cities, for $365 million.

=== KGME ===
In 1999, Chancellor sold KGME (1360 AM), a sports talk station, to Salem Communications. Its programming and call sign then moved to the 550 frequency, with KOY and its nostalgia format replacing classic country KISO at 1230 AM. Chancellor then merged with Capstar Communications later in the year and changed its name to AMFM, Inc.

=== KFYI ===
Later that year, Clear Channel Communications, predecessor to iHeartMedia, merged with AMFM. Clear Channel opted to sell four of AMFM's FM stations in Phoenix and retain all of its local AMs, including KGME at 550 and KFYI at 910. When the deal closed in September 2000, Clear Channel immediately moved to swap KFYI and KGME, moving the talk station to 550 and sports to 910. In conjunction with the swap, KFYI debuted a morning show hosted by former KTVK anchor Heidi Fogelsong and Jim Sharpe. In 2001, Heywood returned to the 550 frequency from KTAR, replacing Sharpe; the morning show was ended in 2003 and Heywood released due to "lack of ratings performance".

Former Congressman J. D. Hayworth hosted a weekday show in the late 2000s on KFYI. He resigned from KFYI in 2010 to pursue an unsuccessful run for the U.S. Senate against Senator John McCain.

On March 8, 2006, KFYI made news when fill-in host Brian James suggested that the United States National Guard and Border Patrol should shoot to kill people illegally crossing the U.S.-Mexican border. He also said on the air that he would be "happy to sit there with my high-powered rifle and my night scope" and kill people as they cross the border. Those remarks prompted Arizona Attorney General Terry Goddard and U.S. Attorney Paul Charlton to complain to the Federal Communications Commission (FCC), calling the remarks "irresponsible and dangerous".

== Programming ==
KFYI's weekday lineup begins with a local interview and information show hosted by James T. Harris, "The Conservative Circus"; Harris began hosting afternoons at KFYI in 2018 and moved to mornings in 2020. In afternoon drive time, Garret Lewis hosts The Afternoon Addiction, a program shared with KNST in Tucson. The rest of the weekday schedule consists of nationally syndicated conservative talk shows, many supplied by co-owned Premiere Networks, including The Clay Travis and Buck Sexton Show, Sean Hannity, Glenn Beck, and Coast to Coast AM with George Noory. Weekend programs include a variety of specialty shows on topics including money, health, gardening, real estate, the outdoors, and beer, plus weekend syndicated shows from Bill Handel, Ben Ferguson, and Bill Cunningham.

Because Arizona does not observe daylight saving time, syndicated programs air on a one-hour recorded delay from mid-March to early November, so they can be heard in the same time slots on KFYI year-round. This practice has been utilized by KFYI since the mid-1990s (when it was at 910).

== Bibliography ==
- Evans, James F. (1969). Prairie Farmer and WLS: The Burridge D. Butler Years (PDF). University of Illinois Press. ISBN 9780252000027. Archived (PDF) from the original on December 21, 2021 – via World Radio History.
- Heinrich, Roger (2005). "AM Radio and AZ Politics: Jack Williams and the Media". The Journal of Arizona History. 46 (3): 269–292. JSTOR 41696916.
