= KOY =

Radio station in Phoenix, Arizona

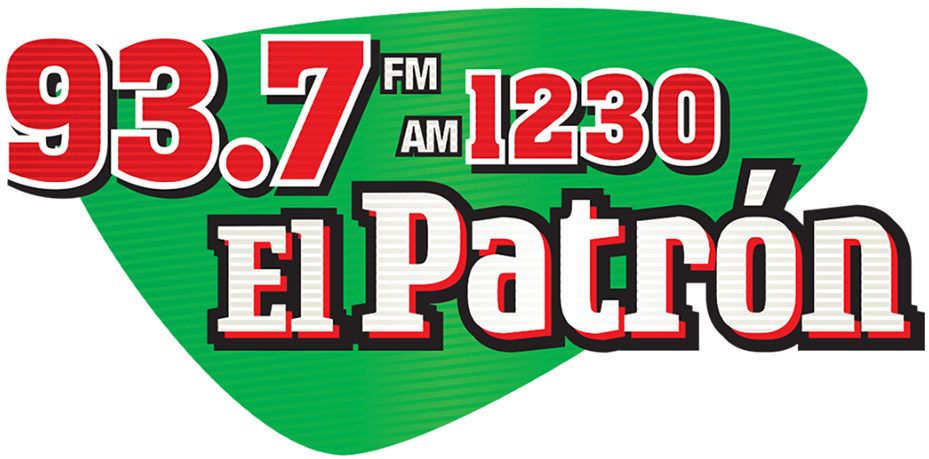
- Phoenix, Arizona; United States
- Broadcast area: Phoenix metropolitan area
- Frequency: 1230 kHz
- Branding: 93.7 El Patrón

Programming
- Format: Regional Mexican

Ownership
- Owner: iHeartMedia, Inc.; (iHM Licenses, LLC)
- Sister stations: KESZ; KFYI; KGME; KMXP; KNIX-FM; KYOT; KZZP

History
- First air date: 1950
- Former call signs: KRIZ (1950–1978); KFLR (1978–1986); KAMJ (1986–1987); KMYL (1987); KAMJ (1987–1991); KISP (1991–1992); KYOT (1992–1994); KISO (1994–1999)
- Call sign meaning: Relocated in 1999 from 550 AM

Technical information
- Licensing authority: FCC
- Facility ID: 63914
- Class: C
- Power: 1,000 watts
- Transmitter coordinates: 33°26′10.2″N 112°6′36.5″W
- Translator: 93.7 K229DB (Phoenix)

Links
- Public license information: Public file; LMS
- Webcast: Listen live (via iHeartRadio)
- Website: elpatronphoenix.iheart.com

KOY (1230 AM) is a commercial radio station licensed to Phoenix, Arizona, featuring a Regional Mexican radio format known as "93.7 El Patrón". Owned by iHeartMedia, the station serves the Phoenix metropolitan area. KOY's studios are located in Phoenix near Sky Harbor International Airport, and broadcasts at 1,000 watts—non-directional—from a transmitter located near Downtown Phoenix. In addition to a standard analog transmission, KOY is available online via iHeartRadio and is relayed over low-power Phoenix translator K229DB (93.7 FM), from which the station's branding is derived from.

== History ==
=== KPHO at 1200/1230 ===
From sign-on in October 1940 to March 1941, KPHO occupied 1200 kHz. On March 28, 1941, KPHO and all other stations on 1200 moved to 1230, when the North American Regional Broadcasting Agreement (NARBA) took effect. Beginning in 1944, the station carried the dramas, comedies, news and sports of the Blue Network, which later became ABC; previously, both NBC Red and NBC Blue network programs aired on KTAR (620 AM). On September 21, 1949, KPHO moved to 910 kHz, which was later the home of KJJJ and KFYI and is now KGME with sports talk.

=== KRIZ ===
The move of KPHO to 1230 created an opening for a new local station to use its facilities and frequency. Howard M. Loeb filed on September 23, 1949, for a new radio station on 1230 kHz in Phoenix; the proposed station would use KPHO's former plant at 24th Avenue and Buckeye Road, which Loeb had purchased. The Federal Communications Commission (FCC) approved on March 6, 1950, and KRIZ made its debut later that year. It affiliated first with the small Liberty Broadcasting System and then with a replacement service set up to service its former western affiliates upon its closure in 1952.

Loeb sold KRIZ to Burton K. Wheeler, a former U.S. senator from Montana, and his two sons in 1957. After being sold to Shamrock Broadcasting in 1962, the station increased daytime power to 1,000 watts in 1963, an improvement that helped it wage a defining battle in Phoenix radio: the Top 40 format war between KRIZ and KRUX (1360 AM), which lasted through the decade until listening habits began to shift to FM in the 1970s with the launch of KDKB. In 1971, Doubleday Broadcasting Co., a subsidiary of publisher Doubleday and Company, acquired the station for $1.05 million. At that time, program director and station personality Pat McMahon departed.

=== The Family Life years ===
In 1977, Doubleday decided to sell KRIZ, having been unable to find an FM station to purchase to create an AM-FM pair in the Phoenix market and being unsatisfied with its 250-watt nighttime signal. The next year, it found a buyer making its second purchase in the Grand Canyon State: Family Life Radio of Jackson, Michigan. Family Life, which programmed Christian talk and teaching, had bought 1450 AM in Tucson the year before and relaunched it as KFLT.

On July 30, 1978, the Top 40 era ended and KRIZ became KFLR, the fifth Family Life station and second in Arizona. Under Family Life, KFLR operated on a listener-supported basis, making it unique among the five Christian radio stations in the Valley; the ministry had paid for the down payment on the station with donations. After leasing the Buckeye Road site for its first two years on air, Family Life bought the site outright with the help of a donation from the Tell Foundation, which received naming rights to the studios; the mortgages on the property were fully paid off in 1983.

In the 1980s, Family Life explored options to improve its service and facilities. It filed in 1982 to move to 660 kHz, a clear channel frequency being broken down, for which six mutually exclusive applications were docketed in the western United States; the application of the Navajo Nation was selected instead. In 1984, Family Life obtained a construction permit for a new noncommercial FM station at 90.3 MHz, which was activated in December 1985 as KFLR-FM; the AM station moved to a partially automated schedule as the ministry focused its time and energies on the new FM outlet.

=== KAMJ ===
Family Life was not actively looking for a buyer for the AM station, but there was someone actively looking for an AM station in Phoenix. Affiliated Broadcasting, owner of KONC (101.5 FM), had contracted to buy the 1360 frequency (then big-band station KLFF) but saw that deal fall through. In March 1986, Family Life agreed to sell 1230 AM to Affiliated.

The acquisition of this AM station happened to have implications for KONC, which had long been the classical music station in the Valley. Affiliated announced its plans to flip KONC to soft adult contemporary as KAMJ and initially hoped to use its new property to continue the classical service. However, once the purchase closed in July (simultaneous with the move of Family Life's Tucson station to a stronger signal covering Tucson and Phoenix at 830 kHz), the AM was ultimately used to simulcast the FM outlet outright when 106.3 FM in Sun City opted to go classical instead.

=== A revolving door ===
In the same month that Affiliated took control of 1230 AM, the company announced it was selling all nine of its stations to EZ Communications in a $65 million transaction. EZ took over at the end of 1986 and returned the 1230 frequency to separate programming in February 1987 as adult standards outlet KMYL with the Music of Your Life syndicated format. Music of Your Life had previously been heard on KLFF, but that station lost the format when it fell behind on its payments and entered bankruptcy. However, after financial issues in other markets, EZ Communications corporate opted to cut costs and revert to the KAMJ simulcast after just four months on the air, with three announcers who had moved to the new big band station returning to KLFF. The general manager for the Phoenix EZ stations had fought the change unsuccessfully; the fired staff did not receive an on-air thanks or severance pay, leading The Arizona Republic media columnist Bud Wilkinson to call the cut "the cruelest, most bottom-line-motivated move" of 1987.

Separate programming returned in 1989, when KAMJ added sports play-by-play and phased in sports talk shows, becoming the first sports radio station in the Valley. In January 1990, the station shifted from sports to talk as "Mix 1230 AM".

=== "Kiss" ===
After two years with sports and other talk, however, a lack of ratings led the station to jettison the format and flip to urban adult contemporary as KISP "Kiss" in August 1991.

In 1992, EZ Communications sold its two Phoenix stations to Sundance Broadcasting, which then created the first four-station cluster in the Phoenix market by buying KOY (550 AM) and KOY-FM 95.5 from Edens Broadcasting. The 1230 station was then used to park a call sign: KYOT, which was put on the 95.5 frequency when the former KOY-FM format was dropped in September 1993. In September 1994, 1230 returned to a "Kiss"-based call sign, this time KISO.

Radio deregulation in 1996 brought more acquisitions in short order: Sundance sold its Phoenix cluster and five other stations in Milwaukee and Boise to Colfax Communications for $95 million, and before that deal had even closed, Colfax sold those four and KOOL-FM to Chancellor Media, plus seven stations in other cities, for $365 million.

The KISO call sign and "Kiss" moniker were retained upon the station's next format flip, a switch to classic country in 1998 under the banner of "Kiss Country Oldies".

=== KOY ===
Logo as "KFYI 2"

In 1999, so that AMFM (the renamed Chancellor) could acquire more Phoenix stations, KGME (1360 AM), a sports talk station, was sold off. Its programming and call sign then moved to the 550 frequency, with KOY and its nostalgia format moving to 1230 to replace KISO. In the process, the 1230 frequency inherited the legacy of the second-oldest surviving radio station in Arizona, which signed on 550 as KFCB before taking the KOY calls in 1929.

The adult standards format, which had started on 550 in 1988, ended its 25-year run in Phoenix in 2013. That August, KOY's format flipped to business and money programs, relying on syndicated shows from Bloomberg Radio and paid brokered programming. The next year, the station revamped its talk lineup, adding more non-business conservative talk shows from co-owned Premiere Networks and other suppliers, and rebranded as "KFYI 2", an extension of KFYI.

On September 14, 2017, KOY changed its format from conservative talk to Regional Mexican music, branded as "93.7 El Patrón". Programming began to be simulcast on low-power FM translator K229DB at 93.7 MHz.

== See also ==
- List of three-letter broadcast call signs in the United States
