= KKNT =

Talk radio station in Phoenix

- Phoenix, Arizona; United States
- Broadcast area: Phoenix area
- Frequency: 960 kHz
- Branding: 960 The Patriot

Programming
- Format: Conservative talk
- Affiliations: Salem Radio Network; Townhall News; Westwood One

Ownership
- Owner: Salem Media Group; (Salem Communications Holding Corporation)
- Sister stations: KXXT; KPXQ

History
- First air date: June 22, 1947
- Former call signs: KOOL (1947–1979, 1983–1996); KARZ (1979–1983); KPXQ (1996–1999); KCTK (1999–2002)
- Call sign meaning: "News/talk"

Technical information
- Licensing authority: FCC
- Facility ID: 13508
- Class: B
- Power: 5,000 watts
- Transmitter coordinates: 33°41′34.1″N 112°0′11.5″W

Links
- Public license information: Public file; LMS
- Webcast: Listen live
- Website: 960thepatriot.com

KKNT (960 AM, "960 The Patriot") is a radio station broadcasting a conservative talk radio format in Phoenix, Arizona, United States. The station is owned by Salem Communications Holding Corporation, a subsidiary of the Salem Media Group. Studios are located at 24th Street and Camelback in Phoenix; the transmitter is on the city's northern edge.

Established in 1947 as KOOL, the station became a force in Phoenix radio nearly immediately after Gene Autry purchased the outlet within a year of its operation. The station was a CBS affiliate for decades and spawned a successful television station, KOOL-TV (now KSAZ-TV), and an FM radio station, KOOL-FM. Autry and his business partner, Tom Chauncey, sold KOOL AM in 1978, and it struggled as KARZ for four years before Chauncey repurchased it. After several sales, Salem acquired the frequency in 1996 and instituted the present conservative talk format in 1999.

== History ==
=== KOOL ===
In 1945, Maricopa Broadcasters, Inc., a group of Arizona residents, incorporated and filed an application with the Federal Communications Commission (FCC) to build a new radio station on 960 kHz in Phoenix. The application was placed into comparative hearing with a bid from a company known as Radio Phoenix, but that firm withdrew its application, clearing the way for a construction permit to be granted on December 17, 1946.

In early 1947, construction and hiring proceeded apace for the new station, to be known as KOOL. A four-tower array was built for the 5,000-watt directional station on part of the Clyde Pierce ranch in midtown Phoenix, while studios were set up in the Hotel Adams and Carl D. Haymond of Tacoma, Washington, the principal backer in the station, led hiring. KOOL began broadcasting on June 22, 1947, as an affiliate of the Mutual Broadcasting System and Don Lee Network; it also represented Mutual programs in the state and set up the "Radio Network of Arizona", which signed fledgling Tucson station KCNA as its first affiliate.

Four months after starting, a major star acquired the station: Gene Autry, who disposed of a minority interest in KPHO (1230 AM) to purchase KOOL. (Both stations were located in the Hotel Adams at the same time.) In Tucson, Autry and Charles Garland, who had been KPHO's general manager, owned station KOPO. The acquisition of the station, for just under $250,000, approved on April 8, 1948. Garland had already begun a revamp of KOOL's programming.

Autry was long associated with CBS and co-owned Columbia Records; however, CBS programs aired in Phoenix over KOY (550 AM). This changed at the start of 1950, when Autry secured CBS affiliation for KOOL over protests from KOY.

Under Autry, KOOL became one of the most important radio stations in the state. It spawned television station KOOL-TV in 1953 and KOOL-FM 94.5 in 1960. Tom Chauncey, who had assisted in launching the TV station, became an investor in the radio station as well when Garland sold his interest in 1954; that year, the station moved in with KOOL-TV at its studios at 5th Street and Adams. When KOY was sold to Edens Broadcasting in 1968, several top executives defected to KOOL. The call sign gave rise to the greeting telephone callers received when they called the KOOL stations: "It's KOOL in Phoenix", ironic for a city known for its hot weather.

=== KARZ ===
In 1978, KOOL AM was sold to Stauffer Communications of Topeka, Kansas, with the FM and television stations remaining under the ownership of Gene Autry and Tom Chauncey. After approval was given, the AM station changed its call sign to KARZ on May 1, 1979, but though the station moved to new studios at 22nd Street and Camelback Road, there were no changes in personnel or programming. The Arizona Republic's editorial board marked the end of an era and noted the station's public service record under more than 30 years of Autry–Chauncey ownership.

The station continued its adult contemporary format under Stauffer for two years, but amidst continually falling ratings and a struggle to define itself, KARZ flipped to country at the end of February 1981, joining four other local stations in that format and branding as "K-960". Where KOOL had been one of the top five stations in the market in 1975, it had tumbled to near the bottom of an expanding Phoenix radio marketplace by 1982.

=== Return to KOOL ===
Chauncey sold KOOL-TV to Gulf United Corporation in late 1982 and immediately repurchased KARZ from Stauffer for $2 million after the struggling station reportedly had been for sale for months. In February 1983, Chauncey closed on the purchase and restored the KOOL call letters to 960 AM, and after considering a news/talk format in competition with KTAR, the station readopted much of the adult contemporary sound and CBS programming it had aired prior to the sale to Stauffer.

In 1986, Chauncey sold KOOL-AM-FM to Adams Communications for $15 million. The deal tied with one for KLZI (99.9 FM) for the same price, announced the same day, as the largest radio station sale in Phoenix history. At the start of 1987, KOOL dropped the adult contemporary format and changed to 1950s/1960s oldies, a slightly older set of music than KOOL-FM was playing at the time, on January 7, 1987. In late 1995, KOOL began simulcasting KOOL-FM, getting rid of its "older-leaning oldies".

=== Salem ownership ===
Rapid consolidation in Phoenix radio would split KOOL AM from its FM counterpart in 1996. Par Broadcasting acquired the KOOL stations and immediately sold both to Colfax Communications of Minneapolis; After acquiring several other Phoenix stations, Colfax spun KOOL AM out to Salem Communications for $1 million.

On October 4, KOOL yielded to KPXQ "Q96", a Christian radio station. As part of its opening stunting, the relaunched station simulcast various Salem outlets from around the United States. After the new year, KPXQ added a local drive-time talk show and aimed to target a younger audience in head-to-head competition with secular talk stations.

Salem acquired the 1360 AM frequency in 1999 as a result of further cluster realignment and consolidation in Phoenix. KPXQ moved to that frequency in 1999, making way for a conservative talk station, KCTK "Compelling Talk". The call letters were changed on September 1, 2002, to KKNT. At the same time, the station relaunched as "News/Talk 960", retaining its lineup of national hosts syndicated by Salem.

== Programming ==
KKNT's weekday lineup primarily consists of nationally syndicated conservative talk shows, many of them from the Salem Radio Network with hosts such as Mike Gallagher, Charlie Kirk, Dennis Prager, and Sebastian Gorka, as well as Mark Levin from Westwood One. In afternoon drive, the station airs the local The Seth Leibsohn Show. Weekends include programs on money, health, finances, the outdoors, firearms, and brokered programming.

One prior local program from KKNT was a weekly talk show featuring Chris Simcox, founder of the Minuteman Civil Defense Corps, which had debuted in 2006.
