= Dan Bickley =

Sports radio talk show host and columnist

- Born: September 17, 1963 (age 63)
- Education: William Fremd High School; Harper College
- Occupations: Sports radio talk show host and columnist
- Spouse: Tamara Bickley
- Children: 3

Dan Bickley (born September 17, 1963) is an American sports radio talk show host and on-line sports columnist in Phoenix, Arizona.

== Early life and education ==
Bickley grew up on the South Side of Chicago, where he developed an early love for print journalism. He graduated William Fremd High School (Palatine, Illinois) in 1981, and from Harper College in 1984 with a degree in journalism.

== Professional career ==
His first job in journalism was with the Chicago Sun-Times, where he was a sports beat reporter. He covered the Chicago Bulls and Michael Jordan during their championship runs. After leaving the Sun-Times he became a syndicated columnist for the Copley News Service. In 1998 he moved to Arizona to cover the expansion baseball team, the Arizona Diamondbacks, for the Arizona Republic. He was also a sports anchor for the local NBC affiliate, until a change of ownership. He became the lead sports columnist for The Arizona Republic and its on-line edition, AZCentral.com. After several years in Arizona, he began doing sports talk radio on KGME and in 2009 the show was voted "Best Local Sports Talk" radio show. In 2013 he moved to KMVP-FM, later branded as Arizona Sports 98.7 FM. In 2018 the show was expanded to four hours, and he left print journalism. He has continued his column only on-line and exclusively for Arizonasports.com. He has expressed a pessimistic view of the future for print journalism: "The Golden Age of Journalism didn't last...newspapers are dying." He now feels liberated from deadlines, paywalls and pop-up ads. He has been called the closest thing Phoenix has to a sports media superstar.

Bickley has written two books, both about sports figures with strong Chicago connections, Jerry Colangelo and Dennis Rodman. In the 2009 Return of the Gold: The Journey of Jerry Colangelo and the Redeem Team Bickley paints a very positive image of Colangelo. He describes Colangelo's difficult Chicago upbringing and how he used his reputation and credibility to save USA Basketball after humiliating Olympic basketball defeats in 2004. Almost a decade later he has retained his enthusiasm for Colangelo, recommending he take over the last place Phoenix Suns. No Bull: The Unauthorized Biography of Dennis Rodman (1997) discussed the career and bizarre antics of Rodman. He posits that rather than his behavior being out of control, Rodman deftly manipulated the media and fans.

Bickley has won multiple awards for sports writing from the Arizona Press Club. The Arizona Press Club's comment on his 2013 award:

Bickley’s London Olympics columns were superbly crafted, painstakingly researched, wonderfully insightful — and stunningly far-ranging, with great depth and breadth as he presented multiple, disparate, unique and fascinatingly comprehensive reports on the Games. He won this category in a landslide.

== Personal ==
Bickley is married to Tamara Bickley, a professional make-up artist, and has three children. Music has always been one of his passions; he plays rhythm guitar for the rock cover band Whiskey's Quicker. He founded the group in 2011.
