= James T. Harris (radio) =

American radio personality

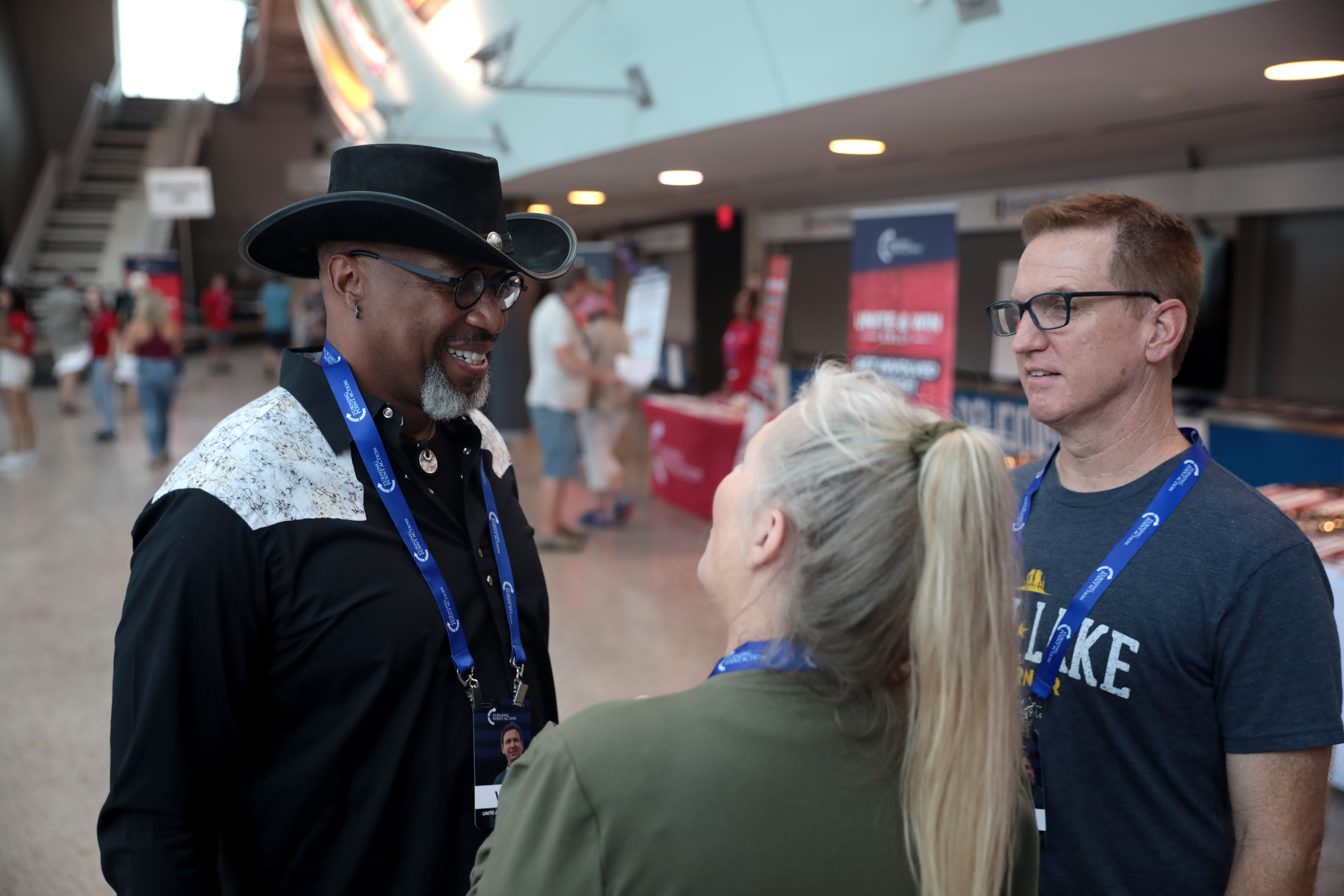
- (left) Arizona Financial Theatre; Phoenix, Arizona
- Born: 1964 or 1965 (age 60–61); Milwaukee, Wisconsin, U.S.
- Education: University of Wisconsin–Milwaukee (BA)
- Occupations: radio personality, talk show host, political commentator, motivational speaker
- Employer(s): KFYI, iHeartMedia
- Known for: The Conservative Circus (2018-)
- Political party: Republican
- Spouse: Janine Harris
- Children: 3
- Website: jamestharris.com

James T. Harris (born 1964 or 1965) is an American conservative talk radio host, commentator, and motivational speaker. He hosts The Conservative Circus weekday mornings on News Talk 550 KFYI in Phoenix and 790 KNST in Tucson, Arizona. Harris is known for his unfiltered commentary on politics, culture, and civic issues, blending humor with conservative perspectives. He has appeared on networks such as NewsMax, Fox News, and CNN, and provides daily commentary for iHeartMedia's Black Information Network.

== Early life and education ==
Harris was born in Milwaukee, Wisconsin, to parents Randy and Dessie Harris, who migrated from Mississippi. He grew up on the northwest side of the city in a Baptist family that traditionally voted Democratic. Harris attended Browning Elementary School, John Muir Junior High School, and Milwaukee Trade and Technical High School. He briefly attended the University of Wisconsin–Madison before transferring to Parkland College in Champaign-Urbana, Illinois, where he began shifting toward conservative views after discussions on social issues. He later studied at the University of Wisconsin–Milwaukee and spent a year abroad at the University of Nottingham in England. Harris graduated from Cardinal Stritch University with a degree in history, sociology, and education. A back injury in 1987 led to surgery and a period of recuperation, after which he returned to school with renewed focus, significantly improving his academic performance.

He first voted Republican for Ronald Reagan but kept it secret from his parents for two years.

== Career ==
=== Teaching and motivational speaking ===
Harris began his career as a high school teacher. His first teaching position was a cooperative role at West Bend West High School in Wisconsin, followed by a full-time position at Brown Deer High School from 1991 to 2000, where he taught history and sociology. During this time, he developed skills in engaging audiences, which led to opportunities in motivational speaking. In 2000, he left teaching to start his own speaking business, initially named Culture Shock and later renamed Illumination. He spoke on topics such as diversity and personal development.

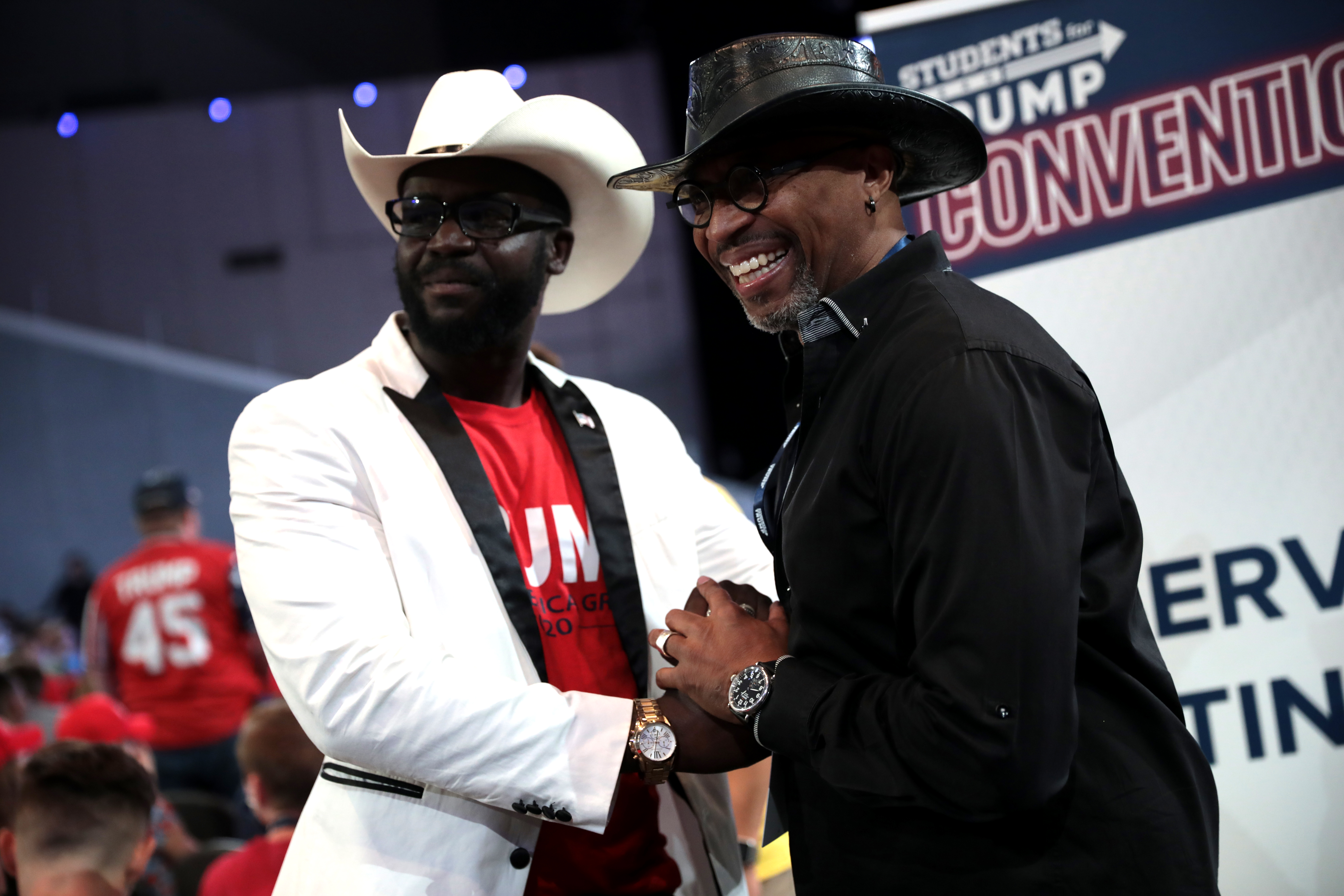
(at right) political event at Dream City Church in Phoenix, Arizona

=== Radio ===
Harris entered radio after frequently calling into Milwaukee's WTMJ-AM, earning the nickname "James from Sherman Park." In 2006, he began co-hosting shows and eventually hosted weekend programs, including "National Conversation". In 2008, Harris gained national attention at a rally for Republican presidential candidate John McCain in Waukesha, Wisconsin, where he urged McCain to challenge Barack Obama more aggressively. The clip went viral on YouTube, leading to media appearances, including a contentious segment on CNN where he stormed off after a disagreement with fellow conservative Shelley Wynter.

Harris relocated to Tucson, Arizona, in 2011 to host a show on 104.1 FM KQTH, where he promoted "Cocoa Conservatism" and featured segments like Hollywood gossip and "Freak of the Week" until 2017. In January 2018, he debuted The Conservative Circus on KFYI in Phoenix, initially in afternoons before moving to mornings (6–10 a.m.) in 2020. Aaron Trimmer, program director for KFYI, said of the shift: "The success he has had hosting afternoon drive on 550 KFYI made him the obvious choice to now take over mornings." The show is described as a mix of political and social commentary and humor, akin to "Rush Limbaugh meets Howard Stern". Trimmer refers to Harris as "the ringleader of the Conservative Circus".

Harris often guest hosts on other radio shows, including The Jesse Kelly Show.

== Personal life ==
Harris is married to Janine Harris, and they have three children. They reside in Phoenix, Arizona.
