= KMXP =

Modern adult contemporary radio station in Phoenix

Phoenix, Arizona; United States
- Broadcast area: Phoenix metropolitan area
- Frequency: 96.9 MHz (HD Radio)
- Branding: Mix 96.9

Programming
- Format: Modern adult contemporary
- Subchannels: HD2: Pride Radio
- Affiliations: Premiere Networks

Ownership
- Owner: iHeartMedia; (iHM Licenses, LLC)
- Sister stations: KESZ, KFYI, KGME, KNIX-FM, KOY, KYOT, KZZP

History
- First air date: October 28, 1961
- Former call signs: KEPI (1962–1964); KMEO (1964–1967); KMEO-FM (1967–1991); KPSN (1991–1994); KCHT (1994–1995); KHTC (1995–1997); KGLQ (1997–1998)
- Call sign meaning: Mix Phoenix

Technical information
- Licensing authority: FCC
- Facility ID: 6361
- Class: C
- ERP: 100,000 watts
- HAAT: 475 meters (1,558 ft)
- Transmitter coordinates: 33.334°N 112.061°W

Links
- Public license information: Public file; LMS
- Webcast: Listen live (via iHeartRadio)
- Website: mix969.iheart.com

KMXP (96.9 FM) is a commercial radio station in Phoenix, Arizona, featuring a modern adult contemporary format as "Mix 96.9". It is owned by iHeartMedia, Inc., with studios on East Van Buren Street near Sky Harbor International Airport. KMXP carries the syndicated On Air with Ryan Seacrest show in early afternoons.

KMXP has an effective radiated power (ERP) of 100,000 watts, the maximum for most FM stations. The transmitter is in South Mountain Park amid other FM and TV towers, south of Phoenix. KMXP broadcasts using HD Radio technology. Its HD2 digital subchannel carries iHeart's "Pride Radio," aimed at LGBTQ listeners.

== History ==
=== Classical and easy listening ===
The station signed on the air on October 28, 1961. The station's original call sign was KEPI and it was owned by Ward James Atkinson. He sold within months to Golden Sounds, Inc. It had studios in the Adams Hotel and it aired classical music as part of the WQXR Network, based at New York's premiere classical station.

In January 1964, Golden Sounds asked for authority to go silent for up to six months. Ultimately, in the time needed to sell the station, it was off the air for nine months as a new owner was sought. When 96.9 returned to the air in October 1964, it was KMEO, broadcasting easy listening music and marketed as "Cameo," a moniker it held through several different owners. It played quarter hour sweeps of soft, instrumental music, with an occasional soft vocal. Beginning in 1967, it was simulcast with KMEO (740 AM). During this time, 96.9 used an FM suffix, as KMEO-FM, with its easy listening format offered on both AM and FM radio.

=== Soft AC, oldies and classic hits ===
KMEO-AM-FM had good ratings. But by the 1980s, the easy listening audience was starting to age, while most advertisers seek young to middle-aged clients. So KMEO began to add more vocals and decrease the instrumentals in an effort to attract a younger audience. By the late 1980s, it had evolved to a soft adult contemporary sound. But several other Phoenix stations were also playing similar music, crowding the field.

On July 4, 1991, 96.9 FM became oldies-formatted "Sunny 97", switching its call letters to KPSN. That was followed by a whirlwind of format and call sign changes. On November 28, 1994, it became classic hits KCHT (later KHTC). It first was called "96.9 K-Hits FM", then "The New 96.9 Classic Hits". It rebranded to KGLQ ("Eagle 96.9") in September 1997. In April 1997, the station was bought by Nationwide Communications, a subsidiary of the Nationwide Insurance Company. The price tag was $34 million.

=== Hot AC KMXP ===
On September 3, 1998, at 3 p.m., after playing "We Will Rock You" and "We Are The Champions" by Queen, KGLQ began stunting with the sound of a ticking clock and messages advising listeners a big change would take place. The messages also poked fun at competing radio stations.

At 3 p.m. that day, 96.9 adopted its current format, hot adult contemporary, as KMXP, “Mix 96.9”. The first song on "Mix" was "New Sensation" by INXS.

In May 1999, the station was acquired by San Antonio-based Clear Channel Communications. In 2014, Clear Channel changed its name to the current iHeartMedia, Inc.

=== Shift to modern AC ===
Sometime in mid to late June 2024, KMXP tweaked its format to a modern adult contemporary format, emphasizing pop/alternative crossovers. The station playlist was altered, with a number of songs that were played before the format change being removed from the playlist, and a number of songs that were previously played on the station (e.g. "SNAP" by Rosa Linn and "Shattered (Turn The Car Around)" by O.A.R.) were added back on the station, along with some songs normally played on alternative rock stations and the AAA format.

== HD Radio ==
Mix 96.9's HD Radio signal is multiplexed. The main signal is a simulcast of Mix 96.9's hot adult contemporary programming. The second channel carries iHeartMedia's PRIDE Radio programming for the LGBTQ community featuring a mix of dance and dance-leaning pop music.
