= Rich Berra =

American radio host and guitarist (born 1969)

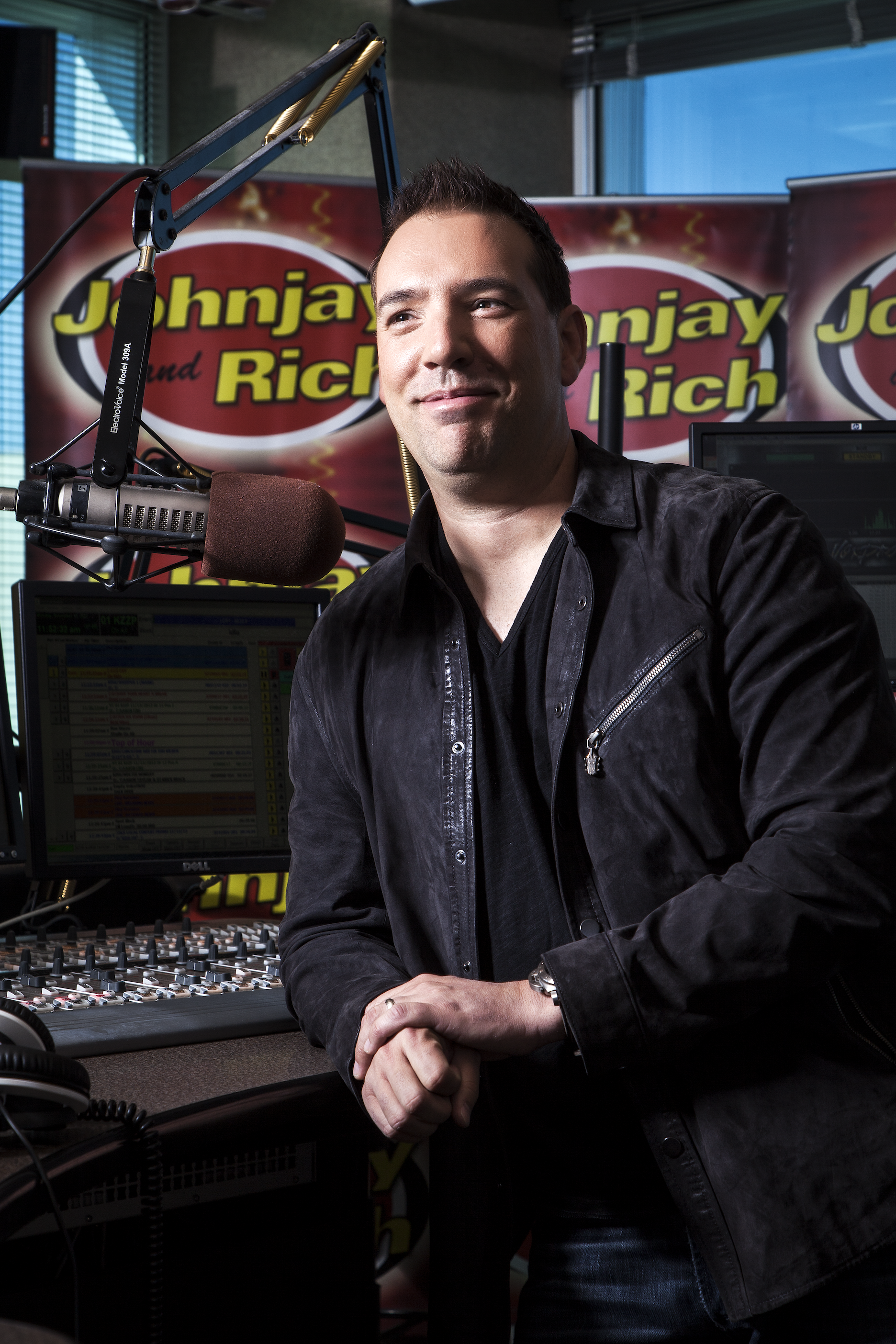
Rich Berra at the 104.7 KISS FM Studios in Phoenix, Arizona in 2013.

Richard Bradley Berra (born March 8, 1969) is an American radio host and guitarist. His nationally syndicated morning radio show is the Johnjay and Rich Show. It is based in Phoenix and broadcast throughout the United States with a listening audience of approximately 1 million per week.

== Early life ==
Berra was born in St. Louis, Missouri. His first stint in radio was at age 14, where he began hosting shows at KYMC in Ballwin, Missouri. From ages 16–18, he worked as an overnight disk jockey at WKBQ in St. Louis. He also worked as morning show producer for the Steve and D.C. Show, taking the station from 19th to 1st place in a time span of two ratings periods.

== Radio host, producer and personality ==
Berra was recruited in 1988 by KGB-FM in San Diego to produce the long-running Dave, Shelly and Chainsaw Show. During Berra’s watch, the show gained momentum and prominence over the next 10 years. Accomplishments include taking the show from #10 to #1 in less than a year. Voice characters created by Berra continue to be played on the show more than two decades later.

In 1998, Berra was hired as a co-host by Kidd Kraddick in the Morning at 106.1 KISS FM in Dallas/Fort Worth, Texas. Two years later, Berra was brought on as part of the EAGLE (KEGL) morning show, also in Dallas/Fort Worth.

Berra joined with Johnjay Van Es in 2001 to form The Johnjay and Rich Show, which originated at 93.7 KRQ in Tucson. He proved to be valuable as Johnjay's side kick. As syndication grew, the show moved to 104.7 KISS FM in Phoenix, Arizona. Johnjay and Rich is now syndicated by Premiere Radio Networks in more than 20 American cities, including Portland, Oregon, New Orleans, Louisiana, Albuquerque, New Mexico, and Colorado Springs, Colorado. The show consistently hits number one in the ratings demographic of women ages 18–34 and 25-54.

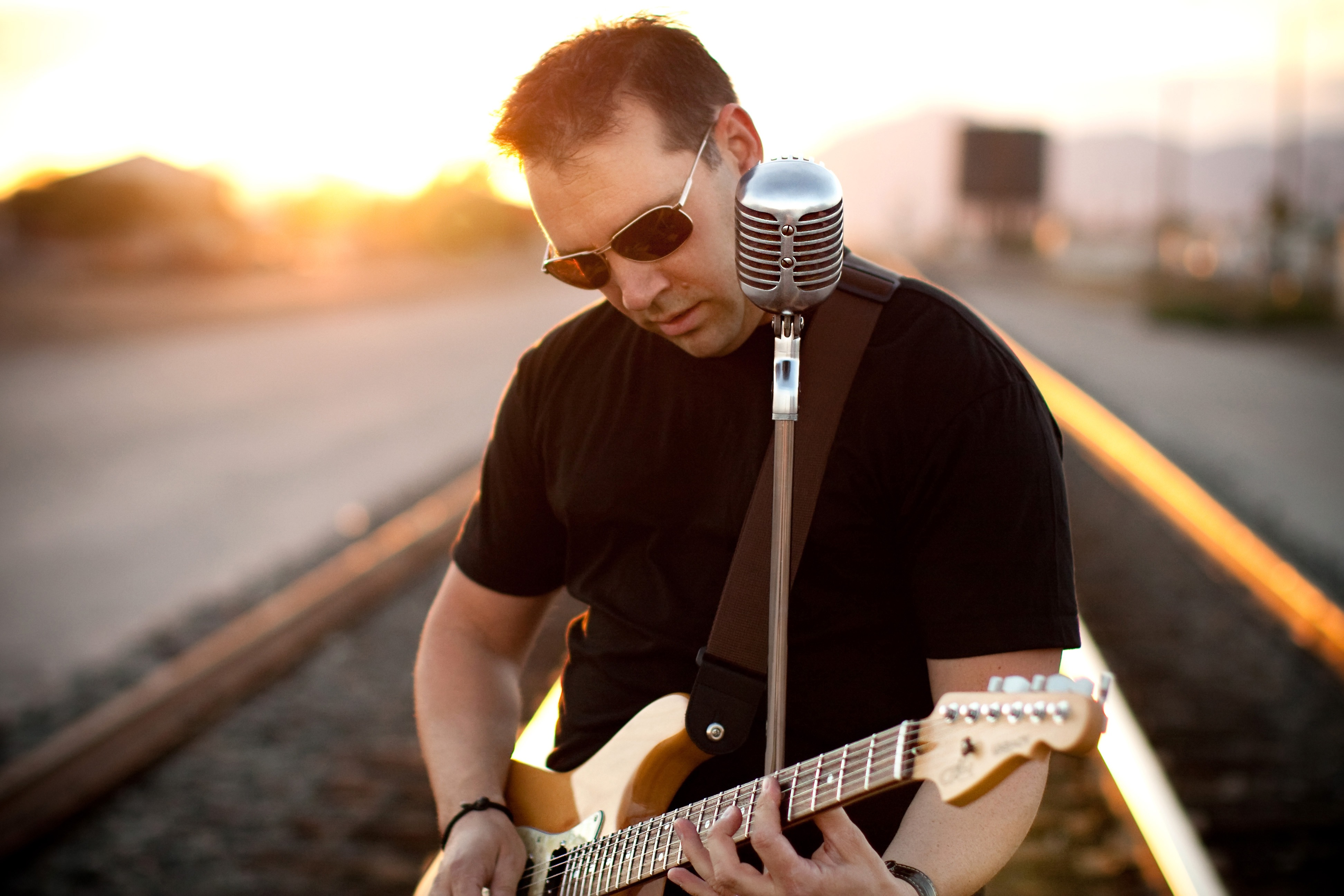
Rich Berra, host and guitarist, in Gilbert, Arizona in 2012.

== Music ==
Berra is also an accomplished guitarist, featured as the guitar player on Jesse McCartney’s acoustic version of the Top 10 single Leavin' which has been viewed on YouTube more than 4 million times.

== Philanthropy ==
In 2010, Berra and Van Es founded the Johnjay and Rich Cares for Kids Foundation, a 501c3 nonprofit that offers assistance to disadvantaged, at-risk children. The foundation’s Christmas Wish program provides gifts to deserving families in need each holiday season. It also spearheads events to benefit families and children in the foster care system. Additionally, the foundation started the #LOVEUP movement, which works to support victims of child abuse and neglect, creating awareness of the need for qualified families to help such children find a forever home.

== Author ==
In November 2017, Berra debuted The Tale of Christmas Steve, a holiday children’s book. The 32-page hardcover book tells a heartwarming story of a Christmas Elf’s journey to find where he belongs.

In November 2019, Berra released the second book in his series, Christmas Steve Meets Christmas Carol, a story of what happens when you let go of fear and start dreaming out loud.

Proceeds from the sale of these books directly benefit the #LoveUp Foundation.
