= KZZP =

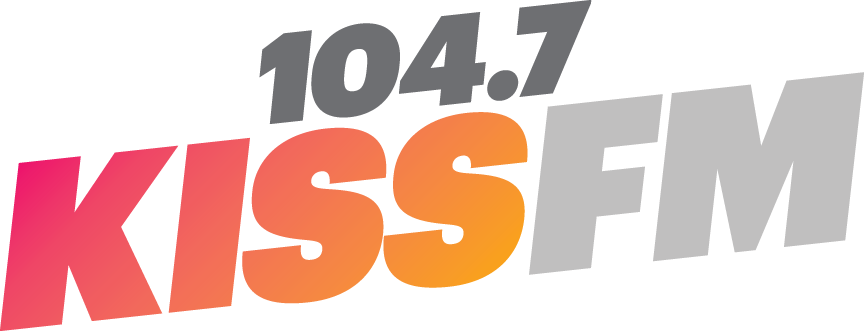
- Mesa, Arizona; United States
- Broadcast area: Phoenix metropolitan area
- Frequency: 104.7 MHz (HD Radio)
- Branding: 104.7 KISS FM

Programming
- Format: Top 40 (CHR)
- Affiliations: Premiere Networks

Ownership
- Owner: iHeartMedia; (iHM Licenses, LLC)
- Sister stations: KESZ; KFYI; KGME; KMXP; KNIX-FM; KOY; KYOT

History
- First air date: 1950
- Former call signs: KTYL-FM (1950–1959); KBUZ-FM (1959–1976); KIOG (1976–1980); KZZP-FM (1980–1991); KVRY (1991–1996)
- Call sign meaning: No particular meaning, with the end "P" standing for Phoenix, though "Kiss" is a plausible backronym

Technical information
- Licensing authority: FCC
- Facility ID: 47742
- Class: C
- ERP: 100,000 watts
- HAAT: 472 meters (1,549 ft); 506 meters (1,660 ft) (CP)
- Transmitter coordinates: 33.334°N 112.060°W

Links
- Public license information: Public file; LMS
- Webcast: Listen live (via iHeartRadio)
- Website: 1047kissfm.iheart.com

KZZP (104.7 FM) is a United States commercial radio station licensed to Mesa, Arizona, and serving the Phoenix metropolitan area. The station airs a top 40 (CHR) format and is owned and operated by iHeartMedia. Studios and offices are on East Van Buren Street in Phoenix near Sky Harbor International Airport.

The transmitter is off Road D in South Mountain Park, amid other towers for Phoenix-area FM and TV stations. KZZP has an effective radiated power (ERP) of 100,000 watts, broadcasting from a tower at 472 meters (1,549 ft) in height above average terrain (HAAT).

== Programming ==
KZZP is the flagship station of the syndicated Johnjay and Rich in the Morning show, starring Johnjay Van Es, Rich Berra, Kyle Unfug and Payton Whitmore. Afternoons are hosted by Suzette Rodriguez, a former Johnjay and Rich co-host. As of January 2021, KZZP also carries the syndicated show Tino Cochino Radio in the evenings.

== History ==
=== Early years ===
The station first signed on the air in 1950 as KTYL-FM. It was the FM counterpart to KTYL in Mesa (now KIHP). The two stations simulcast their programming and were owned by Sun Valley Broadcasting, a subsidiary of Harkins Theatres, a movie theater chain. In 1953, a television station was added, KTYL-TV (now KPNX).

In 1958, the radio stations were acquired by Greater Phoenix Broadcasting, under president Sherwood R. Gordon. The following year, the stations switched call letters to KBUZ-AM-FM, and flipped to a beautiful music format.

In late 1976, the stations were sold to Southwestern Media, Inc.. On January 1, 1977, KBUZ-FM split from the AM, changed call letters to KIOG, and flipped to a syndicated soft rock format from TM Programming in Dallas called "Beautiful Rock". During this time, studios were located at the Thomas Mall in Phoenix. The station was branded as "K-104 FM".

=== Top 40 KZZP ===
Western Cities Broadcasting purchased KIOG in January 1980, along with its co-owned AM station. On February 14, both stations went silent; on March 1, both stations changed to a Top 40 format as KZZP-AM-FM. During those days, the station was known as "104.7 KZZP".

Morning host Jonathon Brandmeier, also known as Johnny B., later became a star at WLUP-FM in Chicago. While in Phoenix, his KZZP show featured prank phone calls, parody songs which Brandmeier himself usually wrote, sang and recorded, along with a cast of regular characters. When Brandmeier left for Chicago, Western Cities won an injunction to keep him off the air in that market until his contract with KZZP had expired. In 1991, Brandmeier hosted a national late night TV show, "Johnny B. on the Loose", syndicated by Viacom.

KZZP, also known as "Hitmusic 104" or "FM 104" in the 1980s, was considered one of America's leading Top 40 radio stations. It was led by program director Guy Zapoleon, and owned by Nationwide Communications, who bought the station in 1985. During Zapoleon's era, the station played mass appeal hits along with some adventurous dance and alternative releases. Zapoleon hired morning man Bruce Kelly from Boston in July 1985.

DJs during this era include Valerie Knight, Kevin Weatherly, Jimmy Kimmel, Dave Otto, Kevin Ryder and Gene Baxter (of Kevin and Bean fame), Todd Fisher, Clarke Ingram, John Machay, Nick Sommers, Michelle Santosuosso, William "Bill Stu" Stewart, Carey Edwards, Steve Goddard, Scott Thrower, Kent Voss, William "Buddy" LaTour, Mike Elliot, John O'Rourke, Steve Grosz, Susan Karis, Dave Ryan, Laurie Michaels, Brandon Scott, and Christopher Lee.

In December 1989, Bruce Kelly signed a lucrative five-year contract with the station, but was released just weeks later. Kelly sued for wrongful termination and won. Years later, Kelly went to KKFR and teamed with former WLUP Chicago DJ Maggie Brock to host "Bruce & Maggie in the Morning".

=== KVRY (1991–96) ===
On April 28, 1991, at 1 p.m., after playing "Funeral for a Friend/Love Lies Bleeding" by Elton John, KZZP began stunting with a ticking clock. Two days later, on April 30, at 3 p.m., KZZP changed to hot adult contemporary, branded as "Variety 104.7". The KZZP call letters were retired for KVRY at the time of the change. The first song on "Variety" was "Roll with It" by Steve Winwood. "Variety" was led by program director Stef Rybak and assistant PD/music director Jon Zellner, who also hosted afternoon drive.

=== Return to KZZP (1996–2001) ===
On March 8, 1996, at 3 p.m., after six hours of stunting with heartbeat sound effects and clips from the television show ER, KZZP returned to Phoenix, this time featuring a modern AC format, and the "104.7 KZZP" name, making an attempt to capture the audience that grew up listening to the original incarnation. The first song on the relaunched KZZP was "Friday I'm in Love" by The Cure.

Brandmeier made a brief return, via syndication, in mornings, in 1996, but ratings were not strong, and after six months, he was replaced with a local morning show. The station returned to #1 in the ratings for a couple of periods during this time. Jacor bought Nationwide's radio stations, including KZZP, in 1997.

Bruce Kelly returned in September 1998, for a brief run in mornings. The new modern AC KZZP was competing with the similarly-formatted KMXP, and would later become its sister station with the merger of Jacor and Nationwide. KMXP had the better ratings so, in February 1999, KZZP began evolving back to mainstream Top 40 by including more rhythmic and upbeat tracks in its playlist; the shift was completed that April. In June, KZZP rebranded as "104-7 'ZZP - Arizona's Hit Music Channel". The station made even more changes, including in its air staff and playlist. The station briefly aired Los Angeles-based Rick Dees in syndication for a few months in 2000. With all of these changes, however, KZZP was usually ranked in the mid-2 to low-3 share range of the radio market.

=== 104.7 KISS-FM (2001–present) ===
On April 20, 2001, at 6 p.m., after playing "Higher" by Creed, KZZP began stunting with a three-day loop of Prince's Kiss. At noon on April 23, the station relaunched as "104.7 KISS-FM". It featured an introduction from Destiny's Child, whose song Survivor was the first song played. By this time, Jacor had been merged into Clear Channel Communications. Many Top 40 stations owned by Clear Channel would later call themselves KISS-FM, regardless of their actual call sign, including KIIS-FM in Los Angeles, KHKS in Dallas and WXKS-FM in Boston.

KZZP, under Clear Channel and program director Tom Caloccoci, went in a rhythmic-leaning Top 40 direction that included some dance crossovers. Although KZZP broadened to include mainstream pop songs by 2004, KZZP's playlist still leaned rhythmic, similar to many Top 40 stations in the Southwest. On September 16, 2014, Clear Channel renamed itself iHeartMedia, to bring its corporate name in line with its iHeartRadio internet platform. Around the same time as the corporate name change, KZZP repositioned to a mainstream Top 40 direction, along with several other leading rhythmic Top 40 stations, such as KYLD in San Francisco, WBBM-FM in Chicago and XHITZ-FM in San Diego.

== HD radio ==
KZZP broadcasts in the HD Radio format. The main signal is a simulcast of KZZP's Top 40 programming. The HD2 subchannel formerly carried Evolution, iHeartRadio's commercial free Dance/EDM station, and was its flagship outlet for the platform.
