= KTAR (AM) =

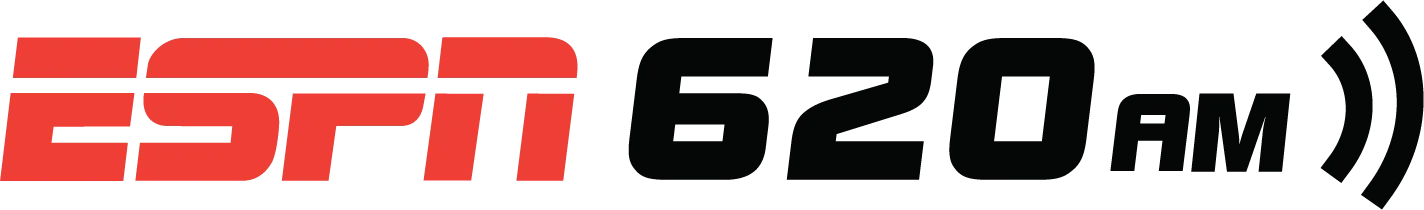
- Phoenix, Arizona; United States
- Broadcast area: Phoenix metro area
- Frequency: 620 kHz
- Branding: ESPN 620

Programming
- Language: English
- Format: Sports
- Affiliations: ESPN Radio

Ownership
- Owner: Bonneville International; (Bonneville International Corporation)
- Sister stations: KMVP-FM; KTAR-FM

History
- First air date: June 21, 1922
- Former call signs: KFAD (1922–1929); KREP (1929) (Note: Not used on air, but registered with the then-Federal Radio Commission.)
- Former frequencies: 833 kHz (1922–1925); 1000 kHz (1925); 1100 kHz (1925–1928); 930 kHz (1928)
- Call sign meaning: "The Arizona Republican" (former owner), later expanded to slogan "Keep Taking the Arizona Republican"

Technical information
- Licensing authority: FCC
- Facility ID: 52515
- Class: B
- Power: 5,000 watts
- Transmitter coordinates: 33°28′44″N 112°0′6″W
- Repeater: 98.7 KMVP-FM HD2 (Phoenix)

Links
- Public license information: Public file; LMS
- Webcast: Listen live; Listen live (via Audacy)
- Website: arizonasports.com

KTAR (620 kHz) is an AM commercial radio station licensed to Phoenix, Arizona, United States. Owned and operated by Bonneville International, it features a sports format airing programming from ESPN Radio. The studios are located in north Phoenix near Piestewa Peak, and the station broadcasts with 5,000 watts from a transmitter site near the corner of 36th Street and Thomas Road.

KTAR was established in 1922 as KFAD, owned by the McArthur brothers, and became one of just two stations in Phoenix (alongside KOY) from the early 1920s through 1940. It was purchased by The Arizona Republican (soon renamed the Arizona Republic) in 1929 and adopted its present call sign in January 1930 as part of a major overhaul. From the 1930s for several decades, KTAR was the key NBC radio affiliate in the state. Its program director, John Howard Pyle, jumped from radio to politics and served two terms as Governor of Arizona. KTAR, which added a television station (KVAR, later KTAR-TV) in 1954 and an FM radio station in 1960, grew into one of the most important broadcasters in the state. After dropping music programming in 1973 to focus on news, talk, sports, and information, it consolidated itself as the leading station of its kind in Phoenix under the ownership of Combined Communications Corporation and Pulitzer Broadcasting; Bonneville has owned KTAR since 2004.

While KTAR primarily broadcasts network programming and live sports overflow, its local programming was spun out in two stages onto the FM band. In 2006, KTAR-FM 92.3 began airing all of KTAR's news and talk programming, and the AM station adopted a full-time sports format. KPKX (98.7 FM) was flipped from music to become KMVP-FM "Arizona Sports" in January 2014, allowing the AM station to become a full-time ESPN Radio outlet and moving local sports talk programming to FM. As Bonneville holds the radio broadcast rights to most major professional and college sports in Phoenix, KTAR carries games in the event of scheduling conflicts with KMVP-FM.

== History ==
=== Early history ===
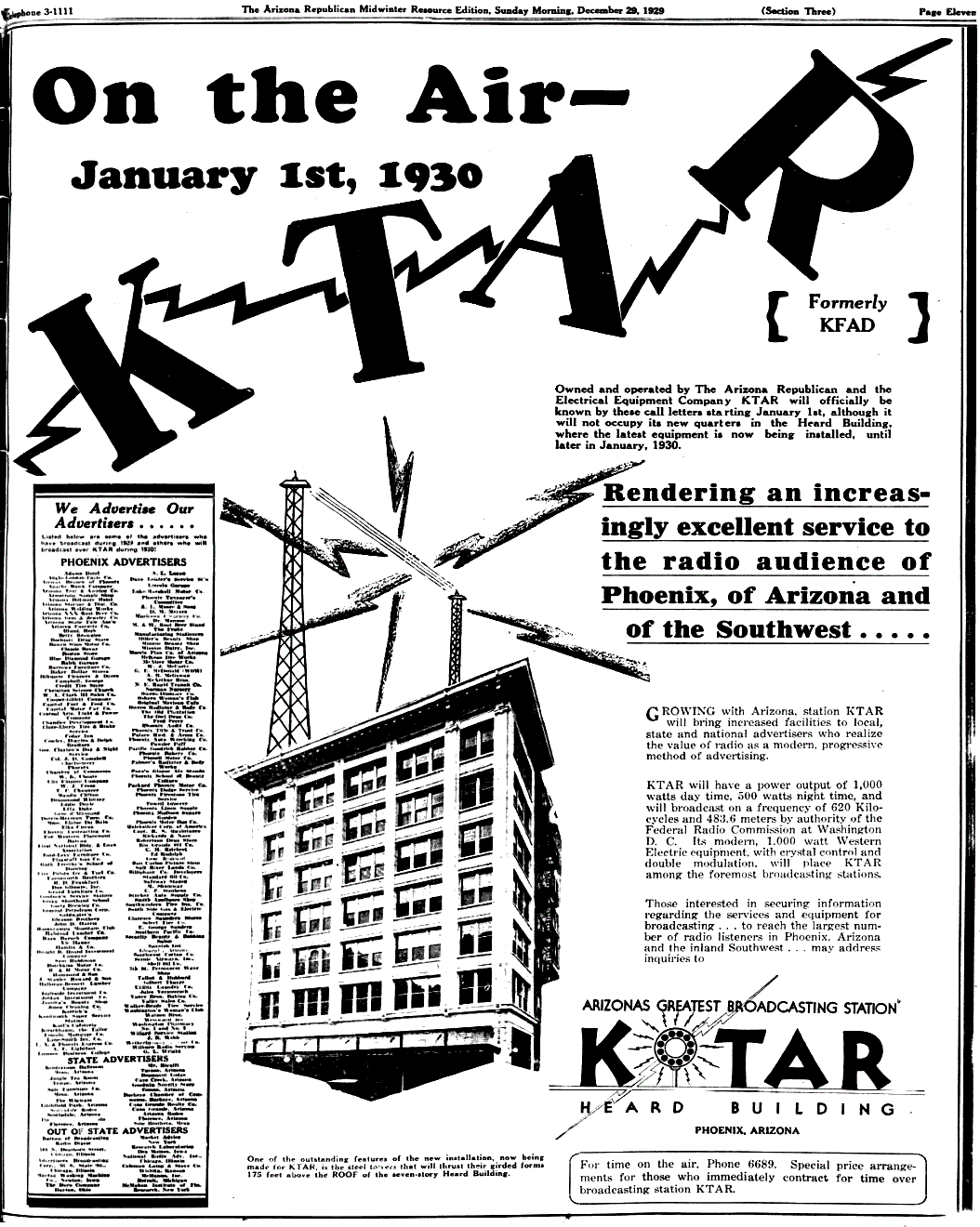
After becoming associated with the Arizona Republican newspaper, the station's formal debut as KTAR was made on January 1, 1930.

Effective December 1, 1921, the United States Department of Commerce, in charge of radio at the time, adopted a regulation formally establishing a broadcasting station category, which set aside the wavelength of 360 meters (833 kHz) for entertainment broadcasts and 485 meters (619 kHz) for farm market and weather reports. On June 21, 1922, the McArthur Brothers Mercantile Company, at 134 South Central Avenue in Phoenix, was issued a license for a new station on the shared 360-meter "entertainment" wavelength. The station's call letters, KFAD, were randomly assigned from an alphabetical roster of available call signs. KFAD was the third broadcasting station licensed in the state of Arizona and, as KTAR, is the oldest surviving one. (Note: The first two licensed Arizona broadcasting stations were KDYW, to Smith Hughes & Company in Phoenix (May 15, 1922, to April 4, 1924), and KDZA, owned by the Arizona Daily Star in Tucson (May 18, 1922, to April 12, 1923). KFYI, the former KOY at 550, can also claim a May 1922 heritage and was reported to have performed the "first broadcasting tests in the Salt River Valley" in May 1922, but it was not licensed until later that year.) The original station was built by Arthur Anderson, who would remain with KFAD and later KTAR until his death in 1956 and along the way claimed various Arizona radio firsts.

The KFAD call letters were first printed in The Arizona Republican in November, when the station gave radio concerts at the Arizona State Fair. By April 1923, it was described as the third-largest station in the United States west of Denver, and by 1924, KFAD was broadcasting nightly programs.

In early 1925, the station was assigned to the frequency of 1000 kHz, which was changed a short time later to 1100 kHz. That same year, ownership was changed to Electrical Equipment Company (McArthur Brothers Mercantile Company), and the station was rebuilt, with two 60-foot (18 m) towers topping the Electrical Equipment Company building at 312 North Central Avenue complete with lit "KFAD" letters. In early 1928, KFAD was reassigned to 930 kHz, a change that Phoenix radio listeners found hindered their reception of KOA in Denver and KFI in Los Angeles. On November 11, 1928, as part of a nationwide reallocation under the provisions of the Federal Radio Commission's General Order 40, the station moved to 620 kHz, which has been its assignment ever since.

=== Arizona Republic ownership ===
On September 15, 1929, it was announced that the Arizona Republican newspaper (Note: The Republican became The Republic on November 11, 1930.) and the Electrical Equipment Company had filed articles of incorporation creating the KAR Broadcasting Company, (Note: Name modified in early 1930 to the KTAR Broadcasting Company) which intended to take over and upgrade KFAD. An initial report said the station's new call letters would eventually be "KAR"; However, earlier that year, those call letters had been assigned to a government coastal station located in the U.S. territory of the Philippines. Ownership was transferred to the new company in November 1929, and the call sign on record briefly changed to KREP, representing the newspaper ownership. (Note: This call sign was never used on air and indeed is not mentioned in news reports about the change to KTAR.) The new ownership also began the process of rebuilding the station to operate with 1,000 watts during the day from the Heard Building, where the Republican was located. Instead of KREP, the new owners received permission to change the call sign to KTAR, which it began using on January 1, 1930, in advance of the new facilities being activated on February 4.

June 1930 brought about another milestone in Arizona radio history, as KTAR joined NBC on June 8 with the presentation of a multiple-hour national program, Arizona on NBC Parade. In the early 1930s, KTAR collaborated with Phoenix Union High School and the Phoenix Adult School to present the KTAR School of the Air. An article in Broadcasting magazine recognized the program's success after two years' operation, noting that, in 1932, students "were scattered in 61 Arizona cities and towns and in California, New Mexico, Utah and other adjacent areas in the southwest ... [including] many of the disabled World War veterans quartered in the veterans' hospitals at Prescott and Tucson." By 1933, KTAR was on the main Red and Blue networks from the east and NBC's west coast Orange network, giving it access to the vast majority of NBC programs.

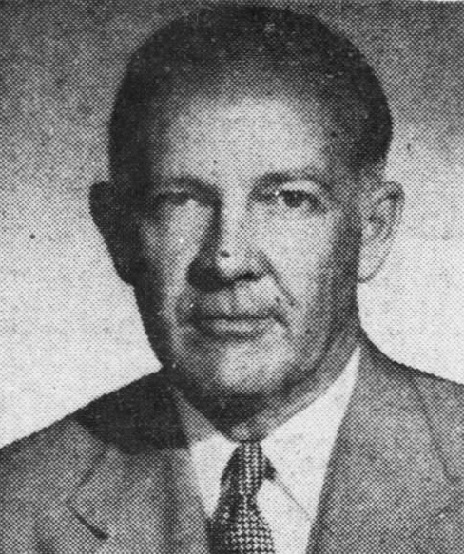
John Howard Pyle worked as KTAR's program director for 20 years prior to becoming Governor of Arizona.

After being lured over to radio from the Republican ad sales department, John Howard Pyle became KTAR's program director in 1930. Five years later, for the first time, KTAR fed an Easter sunrise service from the Grand Canyon to the NBC network. The Easter sunrise service, narrated and written by Pyle, became an annual tradition for KTAR and NBC, presented for 25 years to a national and international audience.

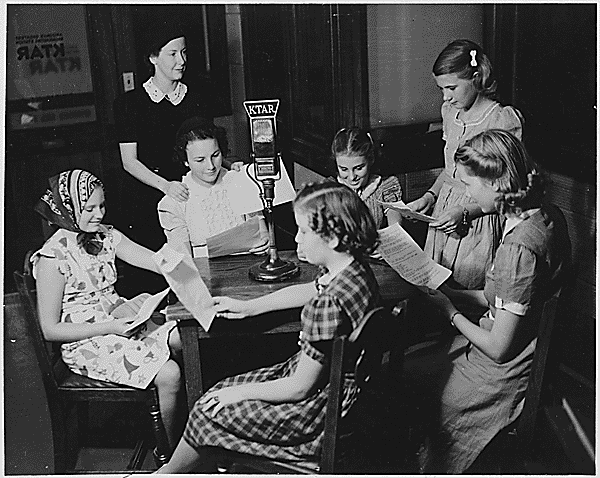
A Federal Art Project radio program by and for children aired over KTAR in 1935

In the late 1930s, KTAR began to look outside Phoenix in its quest to grow as a statewide broadcasting force. KTAR agreed to acquire Tucson station KVOA in 1937, and once the deal closed in early 1939, that station joined NBC, giving rise to a statewide network under the auspices of the Arizona Broadcasting Company (ABC). KVOA was joined later that year by KWJB in Globe, KCRJ in Jerome, and KUMA in Yuma. The latter was replaced by the newly built KYUM in 1940 after KUMA lost its broadcast license. The network became the Arizona Broadcasting System at the end of 1945; the change came as the new American Broadcasting Company sought to claim the ABC acronym for itself and settled with other groups using the ABC acronym.

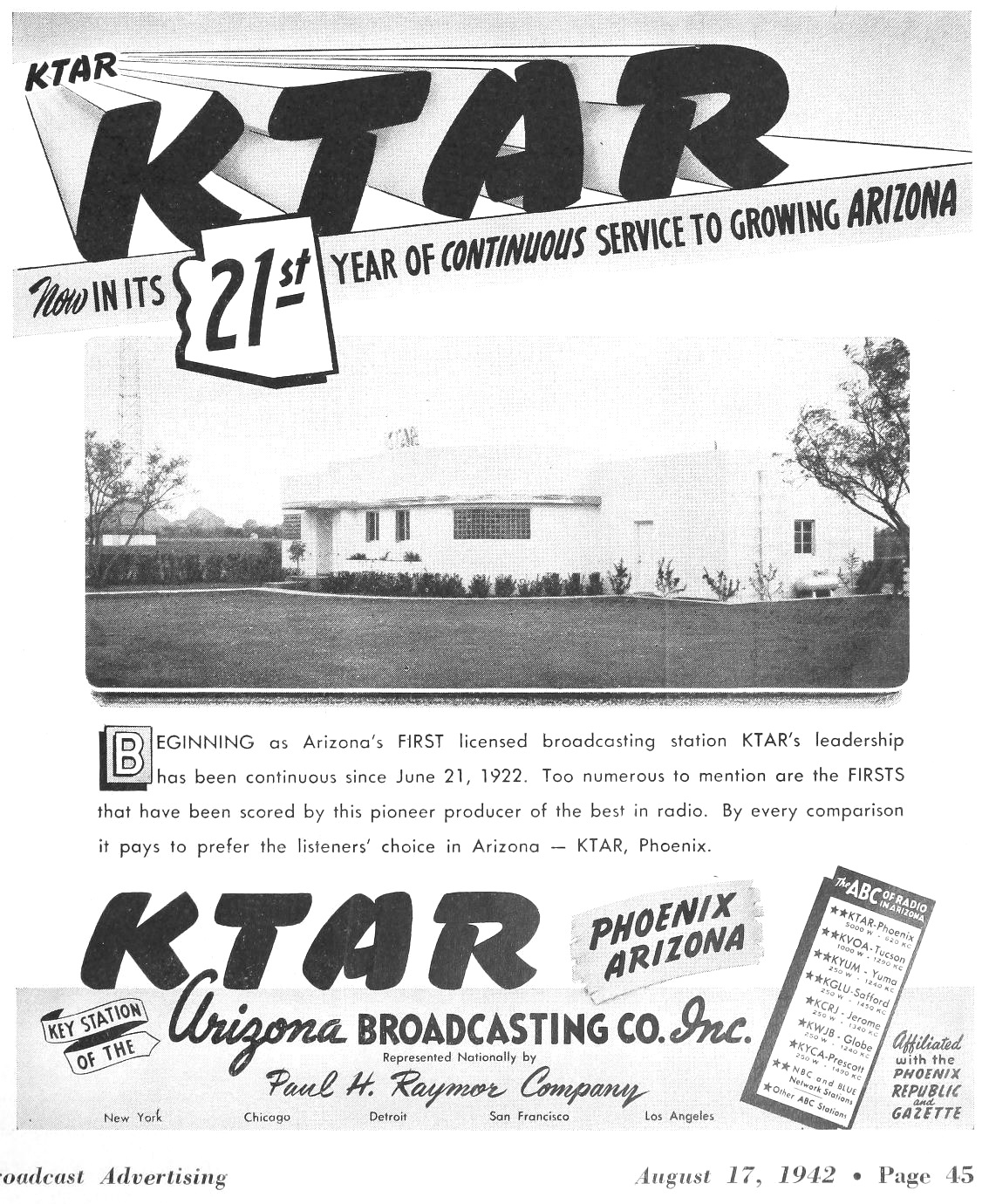
August 1942 advertisement showcasing the station's recently constructed transmitter site at 3659 Thomas Road

KTAR filed with the Federal Communications Commission (FCC) in 1939 to relocate its transmitter to a site at 36th Street and Thomas Road and increase power to 5,000 watts. Broadcasting began officially from the new site in February 1941, having been testing the increased power since the start of the year. Studios remained in the Heard Building.

=== John J. Louis ownership ===
In 1941, the Federal Communications Commission began an investigation as to whether newspaper cross-ownership of radio stations within the same community should be restricted. In 1944, the Republic, sensing a possible ban on cross-ownership of newspapers and radio stations, sold its 77 percent majority stake in the KTAR Broadcasting Company for $375,000 to John J. Louis Sr., of Chicago advertising agency Needham, Louis, and Brorby; Louis had been wintering in Phoenix for seven years. In addition to KTAR, the deal gave Louis ownership stakes in KVOA, KYUM, and KYCA in Prescott. That year, the Blue Network, having been split from NBC, affiliated with KPHO (1230 AM), which had gone on the air in 1940 as the first new radio station in Phoenix since the early 1920s.

In 1945, KTAR sent Pyle as a war correspondent to the Pacific theater of World War II to report on Arizona servicemen fighting in Asia. Pyle's deployment proved timely, as he witnessed some of the key moments in the final months of fighting in Japan, seeing the surrender of Tomoyuki Yamashita firsthand. He also was aboard one of the first planes in the invasion of Japan and the USS Missouri when the Japanese surrendered. By the time Pyle successfully ran for Governor of Arizona in 1950, according to one columnist for The Republic, "his name and his voice were as familiar in Arizona homes as the family radio", and he was the vice president of the KTAR Broadcasting Company.

After purchasing a parcel of land further north on Central Avenue, at Portland Street, ground was broken in June 1952 for a new, $500,000 studio complex. One wing of this building, completed the next year, was left empty and designated for future use by a television station.

=== Expansion into television ===
After World War II, KTAR began planning for an eventual expansion into television. As early as 1945, it had negotiated with the city of Phoenix parks board to obtain access to South Mountain, a prime location for a television transmitter facility. The KTAR Broadcasting Company applied for one of Phoenix's VHF television channels in 1948, proposing to build atop the Heard Building. Its application would have to await the end of the FCC's four-year freeze on new TV stations to be authorized. When the freeze was lifted in 1952, KTAR declared it would be on the air within three months of a construction permit grant, with the new studio complex about to start construction and having already contracted for equipment to furnish it.

What KTAR did not anticipate was a comparative hearing for channel 3, the last VHF channel to be awarded in Phoenix, in which it was pitted against a group backed by a political heavyweight: former United States senator Ernest McFarland, a lead stockholder in the Arizona Television Company. In February 1954, hearings were held on the channel 3 assignment.

The channel 3 contest ended in April 1954, when KTAR announced it would buy KTYL-TV (channel 12) in Mesa for $250,000, a decision that cleared the way for the Arizona Television Company to build KTVK. In announcing the purchase, Louis explained that he wanted a television counterpart to KTAR without going through hearings. When the sale closed in July 1954, KTYL-TV became KVAR; immediately, KTAR-purchased equipment was added to the studios, which were then moved to Phoenix in 1956 over KTVK's objection. The KTAR-TV call letters were not available to channel 12 because it was licensed to a different city from the radio station. After a change in FCC regulations, channel 12 became KTAR-TV in 1961. Louis built KVOA a television sister, KVOA-TV, in 1953. He then sold the two Tucson stations to Clinton D. McKinnon in 1955.

In the late 1950s, KTAR sold much of the land surrounding the tower site to be used to develop a new suburban shopping center, known as Tower Plaza and designed by local architect Ralph Haver. John J. Louis died at the age of 53 while at a business event in Palm Springs, California, on February 19, 1959.

=== Combined with Eller ===
In December 1967, the KTAR Broadcasting Company announced it would merge with Eller Outdoor Advertising, controlled by Karl Eller, to form Combined Communications Corporation, with John J. Louis Jr. as chairman and Eller as president. The deal was approved by the FCC in October 1968. Bill Heywood moved over from KUPD (1060 AM) to be part of the station's morning show, marking the first of four separate stints with KTAR.

The Combined Communications era would lay the groundwork for the station's shift from music and entertainment to news and sports. When the Phoenix Suns of the NBA began—with Eller as a founding investor—KTAR radio and television were the team's first local broadcast partners. Four years later, KTAR hired Al McCoy, already a Phoenix market veteran having worked for several local radio and television stations, to announce the Suns games.

On September 17, 1973, KTAR shed its remaining middle of the road music programming, from a format adopted four years earlier, to take on an all-news radio format under the guidance of news director Roger Downey, who would become an anchor at KPHO-TV. The original format featured network newscasts from NBC and ABC, as well as the Suns, Arizona State Sun Devils sports, and Los Angeles Dodgers baseball.

=== Pulitzer ownership ===
In 1978, Combined Communications agreed to merge with the Gannett Company. The merged company opted to retain channel 12 and divest the Phoenix radio stations; Combined's ownership of the KTAR stations had been grandfathered earlier in the decade when the FCC forbade common ownership of television and radio stations in top-50 markets, but with the Gannett merger, the KTAR cluster lost its grandfathered protection. The radio stations were traded to Pulitzer Broadcasting, whose newspaper division owned the morning Arizona Daily Star in Tucson, in 1979 for KSD radio in St. Louis and $2 million. KTAR-TV then changed its call sign to KPNX on June 4, 1979, since the radio properties had held the KTAR call letters first; at the time, broadcast stations with different owners could not share the same call letters.

Meanwhile, radio personalities who would become staples of KTAR for years or decades were added to the lineup. Preston Westmoreland joined from KXIV in 1978, and he was joined four years later by Pat McMahon, already a veteran radio and television personality in Phoenix. KTAR's sports programming was revamped in 1981; sportscaster Lee Hamilton moved from Ohio to host the 620 Sportsline program until 1987, when he left after becoming the radio voice of the San Diego Chargers after leading the show to high ratings. His replacement was Greg Schulte, who had worked at KTAR in the 1970s, was fired in a round of cuts in 1980, and returned in 1982.

KTAR's 1988 coverage of the impeachment of Evan Mecham won the station its only George Foster Peabody Award. That same year, it became the first radio home of the newly relocated Phoenix Cardinals; the color announcer, Tom Dillon, was also the voice of the Sun Devils on KTAR and other stations from 1973 to 1997. (The Cardinals departed after the 1993 season for KESZ, which was co-owned with KTVK, then the team's TV partner.) In 1991, a traffic helicopter contracted by the station crashed, killing the pilot.

Pulitzer added a second Phoenix AM station to its portfolio in 1996, when it acquired KVVA (860 AM) at bankruptcy auction. It became sports talk outlet KMVP, but ratings were poor, as was the facility's nighttime signal. The new sports station also took on some of KTAR's heavy sports rights load, with ASU moving after 13 years on 620 to the new 860. KTAR was also a charter investor in the expansion Arizona Diamondbacks, whose games aired on KTAR (except for several on the new KMVP) and were announced by Schulte.

=== Three sales in five years ===
In February 1998, Pulitzer put its broadcasting division on the market; this included its nine television stations, Phoenix radio properties, and the firm's only other radio stations, AM outlets in Kentucky and North Carolina. Hearst-Argyle Television, the broadcasting division of the Hearst Corporation, agreed to acquire Pulitzer Broadcasting for $1.15 billion that May, with the deal being consummated in March 1999.

Hearst-Argyle's short ownership of KTAR, KMVP, and KKLT was consistently marked by speculation that a sale was imminent, given the corporation's heavy concentration on local television stations. In 2000, it entered into an agreement with Emmis Communications by which Emmis would trade a television station within three years to Hearst-Argyle or pay $160 million in cash while taking immediate programming control of the stations. Emmis also added KKFR (92.3 FM), which was sold as a result of the merger of Clear Channel Communications and AMFM. In 2004, Emmis then traded three of the Phoenix stations (KTAR, KMVP, and KKLT) to Bonneville International in exchange for WLUP-FM in Chicago—allowing the company to realize a longtime goal of having two stations in that city—and $70 million. The next year, Bonneville reacquired the Cardinals radio rights, returning them to KTAR after an 11-season absence.

=== News and sports split ===
When Bonneville announced in May 2006 that it would purchase KKFR from Emmis for $77.5 million, it also announced its intention to move KTAR's news-talk programming to the FM band. The second frequency set in motion a plan to split KTAR into two stations, a news/talk station on FM and a sports talk outlet on AM, with the latter serving as an effective replacement for KMVP. KTAR began simulcasting on AM and FM on September 18, 2006, and on January 1, 2007, the AM station became "Sports 620 KTAR", taking on KTAR's sports rights to the Diamondbacks, Cardinals, Suns, and ASU. KTAR-FM was used for sports overflow and to simulcast the Cardinals, which aired on AM and FM.

KTAR's sports talk lineup largely mixed ESPN Radio programming and local shows, with personalities including Ron Wolfley, Doug Franz, and John Gambadoro. By 2014, KTAR held the rights to all four major professional teams in Phoenix—the Cardinals, Diamondbacks, Suns, and Coyotes—as well as ASU. In the case of the Coyotes, who have departed from KTAR on several occasions to find another partner, their doing so has been cited for reducing coverage of the NHL team in the local sports media.

=== Second sports split ===
After decades of airing a musical format on 98.7 FM, Bonneville ceased airing its "The Peak" adult hits format and flipped that station to sports on January 6, 2014, initially simulcasting 620 AM. Local sports talk then moved exclusively to FM on September 15. KTAR became mostly a pass-through for national ESPN Radio programming. However, it also airs Suns, Diamondbacks and Sun Devils games in the event KMVP has a conflict.

Beginning January 6, 2025, KTAR AM became the new home of Roc & Manuch, featuring former NFL quarterback Dan Manucci, which had aired on KGME from 2019 to 2024. The station continues with its ESPN Radio and overflow sports play-by-play outside of this program.
