= KESZ =

Adult contemporary radio station in Phoenix, Arizona

- Phoenix, Arizona; United States
- Broadcast area: Phoenix metropolitan area
- Frequency: 99.9 MHz (HD Radio)
- Branding: 99.9 KEZ

Programming
- Format: Adult contemporary
- Subchannels: HD2: Bilingual AC "Magic"; HD3: Sports (KGME simulcast)
- Affiliations: Premiere Networks

Ownership
- Owner: iHeartMedia; (iHM Licenses, LLC)
- Sister stations: KFYI; KGME; KMXP; KNIX-FM; KOY; KYOT; KZZP

History
- First air date: July 4, 1982
- Former call signs: KNNN (1982–1984); KLZI (1984–1988)
- Call sign meaning: "Easy"

Technical information
- Licensing authority: FCC
- Facility ID: 40992
- Class: C
- ERP: 100,000 watts
- HAAT: 519 meters (1,703 ft)
- Transmitter coordinates: 33.334°N 112.063°W

Links
- Public license information: Public file; LMS
- Webcast: Listen live (via iHeartRadio)
- Website: kez999.iheart.com

KESZ (99.9 FM) is a commercial radio station licensed to Phoenix, Arizona, featuring an adult contemporary format known as "99.9 KEZ". Owned and operated by iHeartMedia the station serves the Phoenix metropolitan area. For much of November and December, the station flips to all-Christmas music, and 99.9 KEZ's normal format is heard on 95.5 the Mountain during the Christmas music period.

KESZ's studios are located in Phoenix near Sky Harbor International Airport while the station transmitter resides in South Mountain Park. In addition to a standard analog transmission, KESZ is available online via iHeartRadio and broadcasts over three HD Radio digital subchannels using the in-band on-channel standard.

== History ==
=== Early years ===
Three applicants filed in 1976 for one of the last Class C FM allotments in Phoenix, Arizona: American International Development, owned by Julia Zozaya; Herbert Owens, owner of Turf Paradise; and KXIV (1400 AM). In June 1979, the Federal Communications Commission (FCC) issued an initial decision awarding the frequency to Zozaya. However, KXIV challenged the initial decision, alleging that the signatures on Zozaya's applications did not match; the commission's review board agreed, overturning the initial decision and finding in favor of KXIV. Zozaya, who was legally blind, appealed the review board's finding, claiming that her disability resulted in the mismatched signatures, and on May 7, 1981, the FCC issued a final ruling awarding the 99.9 frequency to Zozaya.

The station signed on the air July 4, 1982, as Spanish-language station KNNN, Phoenix's first Spanish-language station on FM and at the time the only one operating in Arizona. It operated from a converted home at 4548 W. Osborn Road on Phoenix's west side. Technical difficulties that developed on the first day of operation prompted KNNN to go silent again until July 12.

In late 1983, Zozaya sold the station for nearly $4 million to TransCom Communications, owned by Robert G. Herpe and former KDKB owner Eric Hauenstein. By January 1984, it was apparent that a format change was likely coming as the new owners engaged former KDKB morning man Bill Andres. KNNN ceased broadcasting on February 28 to make way for TransCom's adult contemporary outlet, KLZI, which began broadcasting in March. The new outlet, doing battle with KKLT (98.7 FM), made a dent in its competitor's ratings in the first survey. Meanwhile, the Phoenix market would not get another Spanish-language station on FM until the creation of KVVA-FM in 1987.

KLZI—along with KSUN, which TransCom was in the process of buying—was sold in 1986 to Duffy Broadcasting of Dallas in a $15 million transaction. It was announced the same day as the sale of KOOL-AM-FM for the same price, with both tying as records for the Phoenix market.

=== Relaunch as KESZ ===
On January 15, 1988, KLZI gave way to KESZ "EZ-Rock 99.9", remaining in the adult contemporary format. Also introduced was a new airstaff, which included Barry Chase and Beth McDonald in mornings, as well as Marty Manning. Success was not immediate: with the station languishing at 15th in the ratings that summer, Chase was fired and Manning moved to mornings opposite McDonald.

After the Arizona Television Company, owner of KTVK (channel 3), acquired the station in 1990, KPNX meteorologist Bill Austin joined the morning show, which became known as "Beth and Bill". In the span of a year, Arizona Television purchased KESZ, Phoenix Magazine, and a TV production studio.

The station's share remained steady, but cume increased throughout the 1990s to a top-5 position. In 1997, Arizona Television—by then known as MAC America Communications—announced that it was forming a joint venture with Buck Owens, owner of KNIX-FM; the venture, known as OwensMAC, would operate KESZ and MAC America's struggling station at 103.5 FM. In 1999, KESZ became the market's top-billing station for the first time.

=== KESZ under Clear Channel/iHeartMedia ===
In 1999, Jacor, which was already in the process of merging with Clear Channel Communications, acquired KNIX from Owens and KESZ from OwensMAC for $84 million and $58 million, respectively, marking the end of one of the market's last large independent owners.

"Beth and Bill" continued in morning drive until Austin retired in February 2010 as a result of bladder cancer, when the show was renamed "Beth and Friends"; he died four months later at the age of 55.

== Christmas music ==
Every year beginning in early November, KESZ flips to Christmas music. KESZ was one of the earliest FM stations to adopt the format, which had originated in Phoenix, first on KMEO, then on KOY after KMEO's demise; KESZ, noting that many of its listeners were migrating to the adult standards-formatted KOY during the Christmas season, began programming its own Christmas music in 1996. When Jacor/Clear Channel purchased the station in 1999, it noted KESZ's success with the format and, in 2000, began introducing the all-Christmas format in test markets, then in 2001 rolled the format out nationwide.

KESZ has continued to see success with Christmas music and is typically one of the top-rated stations in the United States during the holiday season. In the Holiday 2019 Nielsen Audio survey, KESZ earned a station-record 19.2 rating, up from the prior two years.

== HD Radio ==
KESZ's HD Radio signal is multiplexed. The main signal is a simulcast of KESZ's adult contemporary programming. The second channel initially carried KEZ's Classic Channel programmed by iHeartMedia's Format Lab classic hits format consisting of songs from the 1960s, 1970s and 1980s. As of April 2017, this changed to iHeart 70s. On October 1, 2017, KESZ-HD2 switched to a Christmas music format and continued to do so until November 14, 2018, when the primary station went Christmas (as planned) for the holiday season, and the HD2 moved to soft adult contemporary as "99.9 HD2 The Breeze." The move gave iHeart the right to use the "Breeze" name in the state of Arizona, preventing any other station group to use the name in the case of another station flipping to soft AC, which saw a renewed interest in late 2018. In September 2019, KESZ added a simulcast of KGME "Fox Sports 910" to its HD2 stream, bumping The Breeze format to HD3.
