= KNLB =

Christian radio station in Lake Havasu City, Arizona

- Lake Havasu City, Arizona; United States
- Broadcast area: Laughlin, Nevada
- Frequency: 91.1 MHz
- Branding: Your Celebration Radio

Programming
- Format: Christian Talk and Teaching - Christian music

Ownership
- Owner: Advance Ministries, Inc.

History
- First air date: July 16, 1983

Technical information
- Licensing authority: FCC
- Facility ID: 48504
- Class: C3
- ERP: 8,000 watts
- HAAT: 138 meters (453 ft)
- Transmitter coordinates: 34°29′10″N 114°13′6″W

Links
- Public license information: Public file; LMS
- Webcast: Listen live
- Website: www.knlb.com

KNLB (91.1 FM) is a non-commercial, listener-supported radio station licensed to serve Lake Havasu City, Arizona, it airs a Christian talk and teaching radio format with some Christian music. KNLB is owned by Advance Ministries with studios and offices on Acuna Boulevard North.

KNLB has an effective radiated power (ERP) of 8,000 watts, its transmitter is east of Lake Havasu City. Programming is also heard on numerous FM translators around the Southwestern United States, and throughout North and Central America via Free To Air Satellite on Galaxy 19 at 97w and on channel 1005 on Glorystar Christian Satellite.

== Programming ==
The station primarily carries talk and teaching shows. National Christian leaders heard on KNLB include David Jeremiah, Joyce Meyer, J. Vernon McGee, Charles Stanley, James Dobson, Jim Daly, Joni Eareckson Tada and Chuck Swindoll. When teaching programs are not scheduled, KNLB plays Christian music.

KNLB is supported by its listeners, it asks for donations during on-air fundraisers and on its website.

== Signal ==
KNLB has been granted a U.S. Federal Communications Commission construction permit to move to a new transmitter site, change to Class C1, begin using a directional antenna, decrease its effective radiated power (ERP) to 1,700 watts and raise its height above average terrain (HAAT) to 817 meters (2,680 ft).

FM translators simulcast the signal throughout the Mojave Desert in Arizona, Nevada, New Mexico and California:

Broadcast translators for KNLB
Call sign	Frequency	City of license	FID	FCC info
K201ER	88.1 FM	Holbrook, Arizona	89665	LMS
K201IB	88.1 FM	Heber-Overgaard, Arizona	146233	LMS
K202BU	88.3 FM	Quartzsite, etc., Arizona	16763	LMS
K205FQ	88.9 FM	Whiteriver, Arizona	151270	LMS
K206DK	89.1 FM	Bullhead City, Arizona	50785	LMS
K207AN	89.3 FM	Blythe, California	67809	LMS
K209FC	89.7 FM	Tucumcari, New Mexico	154461	LMS
K210EF	89.9 FM	Clifton, Arizona	151026	LMS
K211FC	90.1 FM	Eagar, Arizona	146851	LMS
K212FP	90.3 FM	Seligman, Arizona	145997	LMS
K213ER	90.5 FM	Winslow, Arizona	147095	LMS
K213FF	90.5 FM	Prescott, Arizona	144993	LMS
K215ET	90.9 FM	Barstow, California	150648	LMS
K217AW	91.3 FM	Yuma, Arizona	67807	LMS
K217BE	91.3 FM	Kingman, Arizona	67647	LMS
K218DS	91.5 FM	North Blythe, California	486	LMS
K218EF	91.5 FM	Truth or Consequences, New Mexico	149467	LMS
K219LB	91.7 FM	St. Johns, Arizona	147072	LMS
K225BX	92.9 FM	Quartzsite, Arizona	141118	LMS
K230AO	93.9 FM	Barstow, California	151246	LMS
K245BL	96.9 FM	Desert Center, California	143730	LMS
K246CL	97.1 FM	Apple Valley, California	156541	LMS
K249EU	97.7 FM	Blythe, California	157256	LMS
K268CH	101.5 FM	Barstow, California	157274	LMS
K276FG	103.1 FM	Yuma, Arizona	48508	LMS
K284BJ	104.7 FM	Williams, Arizona	156864	LMS
