= KNIX-FM =

Country music radio station in Phoenix

- Phoenix, Arizona; United States
- Broadcast area: Phoenix metropolitan area
- Frequency: 102.5 MHz (HD Radio)
- Branding: 102.5 KNIX

Programming
- Format: Country
- Subchannels: HD2: TikTok radio; HD3: Traffic
- Affiliations: Premiere Networks

Ownership
- Owner: iHeartMedia, Inc.; (iHM Licenses, LLC)
- Sister stations: KESZ, KFYI, KGME, KMXP, KOY, KYOT, KZZP

History
- First air date: December 25, 1961
- Former call signs: KNIX (1961–1976)
- Call sign meaning: Its city of license of Phoenix

Technical information
- Licensing authority: FCC
- Facility ID: 7698
- Class: C
- ERP: 100,000 watts
- HAAT: 494 meters (1,621 ft); 506 meters (1,660 ft) (CP)
- Transmitter coordinates: 33.333°N 112.065°W

Links
- Public license information: Public file; LMS
- Webcast: Listen live (via iHeartRadio)
- Website: knixcountry.iheart.com

KNIX-FM (102.5 FM) is a commercial radio station in Phoenix, Arizona, owned and operated by iHeartMedia, Inc. The station airs a country music radio format.

The studios and offices are located on East Van Buren Street in Phoenix near Sky Harbor Airport. The transmitter is in South Mountain Park, off Road B, amid other towers for Phoenix-area FM and TV stations.

== History ==
=== Early years ===
The station originally signed on the air on December 25, 1961. Because there was no associated AM station, the call sign was simply KNIX. It has kept the call letters KNIX or KNIX-FM throughout its history. KNIX previously transmitted with 3,100 watts, a fraction of its current output, only heard in Phoenix and its adjacent suburbs.

KNIX aired a beautiful music format. The license was held by Aztec Radio, Inc., with owners John and Donna Karshner also serving as on-air staff and programmers. Their son, John P. Karshner II, became one of the youngest DJs in America at age 16.

=== Buck Owens Ownership ===
In May 1968, country singer Buck Owens bought KNIX. The purchase documents used his formal name, Alvis Edgar Owens Jr. In addition to KNIX, Owens acquired KYND AM 1580 in Tempe from a different owner. The year before, Owens had purchased an AM and FM station in Bakersfield, California, KUZZ-AM-FM, which had been a profitable move.

Under Owens' ownership, the AM station in Phoenix became country music KTUF 1580, while 102.5 KNIX changed to progressive rock in August 1968. In early March 1969, KNIX-FM switched to country and the power was dramatically boosted to 100,000 watts. KTUF and KNIX-FM began simulcasting the country format, allowing listeners with FM radios to hear it in stereo, while the AM signal could be received on all other radios.

Station bumper stickers proclaimed "K-TUF/KNIX, We Stamped Out 3-Letter Radio." The bumper sticker referred to KOY AM 550, the leading radio station in Phoenix at the time, and the only one with a three-letter call sign. In 1976, the AM call letters switched to KNIX, while the FM station added the -FM suffix, creating KNIX-AM-FM. The AM station began programming classic country music, becoming the flagship station for a network called "Real Country." Meanwhile, KNIX-FM concentrated on contemporary and recent country hits. AM 1580 KNIX ended its association with the Real Country Network in 1985 and the AM-FM simulcast was restored.

KNIX-FM not only led the Phoenix radio market, but was considered one of the premier country radio stations in the United States. Under the leadership of Buck Owens' son, General Manager Michael Owens, and Programming/Operations Manager Larry Daniels, KNIX-FM was consistently number one in Phoenix. It topped the market in all but one ratings period between 1980 and 1990.

=== Clear Channel Acquisition ===
In 1998 Clear Channel Communications acquired the FM station from Owens, while the AM station was sold to The Walt Disney Company. KNIX-FM was sold for $84 million. The Disney Company used the AM station for its Radio Disney children's/contemporary hit radio format, while KNIX-FM kept its successful country format.

On September 16, 2014, Clear Channel renamed itself iHeartMedia, Inc., to bring its corporate name in line with its iHeartRadio internet platform.

Previous logo

== Awards ==
KNIX-FM has won many prestigious awards in the country music and radio industry. They include honors from the Country Music Association, the Academy of Country Music, Billboard magazine, and the Marconi Award for excellence in broadcasting. The CMA honored KNIX-FM as its "Major Market Station of the Year" in 2019, its sixth time receiving the award.

== HD Radio ==
KNIX-FM broadcasts in the HD Radio format. The main signal is a simulcast of KNIX's country programming. On April 25, 2006, Clear Channel announced that KNIX's HD2 subchannel would carry a format focusing on music from new and up-and-coming Country artists. Several years later, the HD2 subchannel began carrying the audio of co-owned talk radio station KFYI 550 AM.

The third channel carries iHeartMedia's Total Traffic Network (TTN), a data only service broadcasting real-time traffic streaming to GPS devices with HD Radio receivers, providing accident, traffic flow, and road construction information. Devices capable of receiving traffic data are available from manufactures such as Garmin and Cydle.

On March 12, 2026, 28 iHeartMedia-owned HD subchannels, including KNIX-HD2, began stunting with a ticking clock, and is expected to flip to contemporary hit radio as "TikTok Radio" the next day at 7:00 PM.

== Former staff ==
- Donna Karshner (Daytime and Program Producer Music Director)
- John Karshner II, (Youngest Licensed DJ at the time) Son of owners
- John P Karshner (Owner Operator) Nighttime Slot
- Charlie Ochs (mornings)
- W. Steven Martin (mornings)
- J.D. Freeman (afternoons)
- "Layback" Lenny Roberts (afternoons)
- John Buchannon (evenings, midday, music director)
- Brian McNeal (evenings)
- Buddy Alan (music director, midday, son of Buck Owens)
- George King
- Steve Harmon
- Jim West
- Steve Wood
- Bill Kramer
- Brian Kelly
- John Michaels
- Erik Potter
- RJ Curtis
- Susan Geary
- Bobby Lewis
- Steve Goddard
- Tim & Willy (mornings)
- Dick Leighton (traffic)
- Bill Denny (sports)
- Larry Clark (news)
- Mary Ganier (news)
- Stephan Kaufman (news)
- Marti McNeil (news)
- Gwen Foster
- Scott Fisher
- Russ Knight
- Larry Daniels (midday)
- Red Skyler
- Bobby Butler
- Mike Scott (afternoon drive & Music Director)
- Camille Wood (traffic & voice work)
- Robin Lee (overnights)
- Gary Gardner (weekends)
- Carolyn Coffey (mornings)
- Garry D (Creative Imaging/Voice)
- Marty McFly (Hunter) (Mornings)
- Hawk Harrison (Mornings)
