= KDYW =

Radio station in Phoenix, Arizona (1922–1924)

KDYW was a short-lived AM radio station, located in Phoenix, Arizona. First licensed on May 15, 1922, it was the first broadcasting station authorized in the state. It was deleted in April 1924.

== History ==
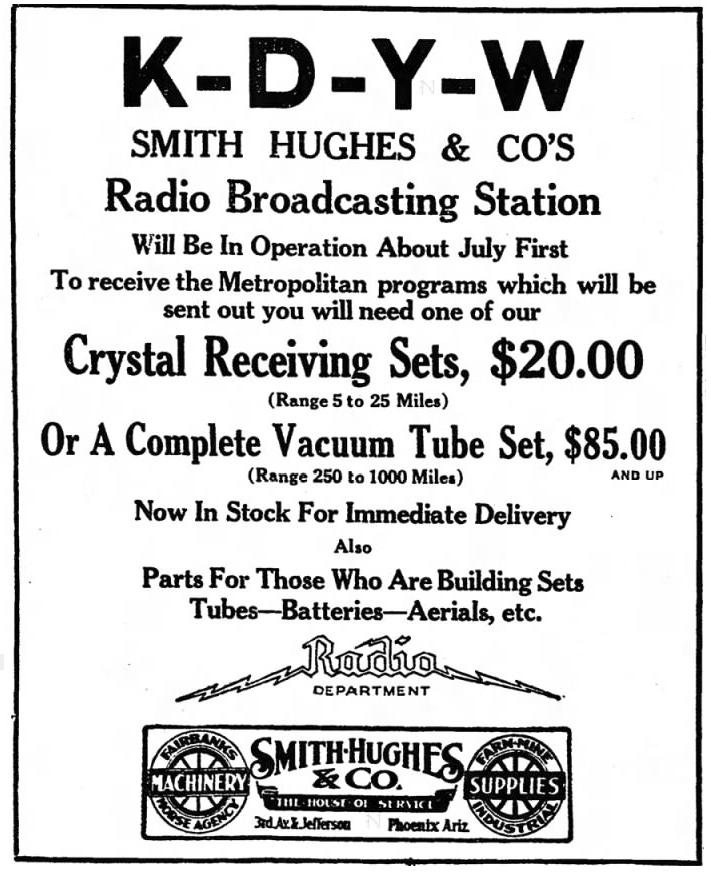
June 1922 station advertisement.

The Department of Commerce regulated radio stations in the United States from 1912 until the 1927 formation of the Federal Radio Commission. Originally there were no restrictions on which radio stations could make broadcasts intended for the general public. However, effective December 1, 1921, a regulation was adopted limiting broadcasting to stations operating under a Limited Commercial license that authorized operation on designated wavelengths of 360 meters (833 kHz) for "entertainment", and 485 meters (619 kHz) for "market and weather reports".

KDYW was first licensed on May 15, 1922, as the first broadcasting station in the state of Arizona, to Smith Hughes & Company in Phoenix, for operation on the 360 meter "entertainment" wavelength. The call sign was randomly issued from an alphabetical list of available call letters. Because there was only the single wavelength of 360 meters for entertainment broadcasts, KDYW had to establish a time-sharing arrangement with other local stations.

After a series of test transmissions, KDYW made its formal debut on the evening of August 1, 1922. The broadcast included a contest consisting of four "code words", to identify the most distant Arizona listeners using crystal and vacuum-tube receivers. The announced station schedule was musical programs on Tuesday, Thursday and Saturday evenings, and commercial and news items on Monday, Wednesday and Friday evenings.

W. Taylor Smith was the main force for establishing the station. He later reminisced: "I don't know why I was in such a hurry to get on the air. I suppose with all of us involved, it was the spirit of adventure in an industry which was still in its infancy."

KDYW was deleted on April 4, 1924.

== See also ==
- List of initial AM-band station grants in the United States
