= KMVP-FM =

Sports radio station in Phoenix

- Phoenix, Arizona; United States
- Broadcast area: Phoenix metropolitan area
- Frequency: 98.7 MHz (HD Radio)
- Branding: Arizona Sports 98.7 FM

Programming
- Language: English
- Format: Sports radio
- Subchannels: HD2: Sports (KTAR)
- Affiliations: ESPN Radio; Arizona Cardinals; Arizona Diamondbacks; Arizona State Sun Devils; Phoenix Suns

Ownership
- Owner: Bonneville International; (Bonneville International Corporation)
- Sister stations: KTAR; KTAR-FM

History
- First air date: July 1960
- Former call signs: KTAR-FM (1960–1973); KBBC (1973–1982); KKLT (1982–2005); KPKX (2005–2014)
- Call sign meaning: "Most Valuable Player"

Technical information
- Licensing authority: FCC
- Facility ID: 52514
- Class: C
- ERP: 100,000 watts
- HAAT: 545 meters (1,788 ft)
- Transmitter coordinates: 33°19′58.2″N 112°3′50.5″W

Links
- Public license information: Public file; LMS
- Webcast: Listen live
- Website: arizonasports.com

KMVP-FM (98.7 MHz) is a commercial radio station licensed to serve Phoenix, Arizona, featuring a sports format branded as "Arizona Sports 98.7 FM". Local programming airs on weekdays from 6 a.m. to 8 p.m. and Saturdays from 7 a.m. to 2 pm, with ESPN Sports Radio heard nights and weekends. Owned by Salt Lake City–based Bonneville International, KMVP-FM's radio studios are on North 16th Street in Phoenix near Piestewa Peak, while its transmitter is located in South Mountain Park.

Arizona Sports is the flagship station of the MLB's Arizona Diamondbacks, NBA's Phoenix Suns, the NFL's Arizona Cardinals and the Arizona State University Sun Devils football games. It was also the flagship station of the NHL's Arizona Coyotes until the franchise left the state of Arizona and technically became the Utah Hockey Club (now known as the Utah Mammoth) in 2024.

== History ==
=== KTAR-FM and KBBC ===
In July 1960, the station signed on as KTAR-FM, co-owned with KTAR (620 AM) and KTAR-TV (channel 12). KTAR-AM-FM mostly simulcast a middle of the road format of popular music, news and sports. In 1973, the FM station became KBBC, to distinguish it from sister station KTAR.

KBBC aired a music format of instrumental cover versions of adult songs, along with some Broadway and Hollywood show tunes. Over time, KBBC added more soft vocals and reduced the instrumentals.

=== KKLT (98.7 K-Lite) ===
The station became one of the nation's pioneers of the "Soft Rock" format under the programming direction of J.D. Freeman who moved over from KNIX-FM afternoon drive. In 1982, the format evolved into soft adult contemporary music branded as "K-Lite".

To go with the K-Lite branding, the call sign was changed to KKLT. The staff included program director Marc McCoy and sales manager Ken Hoag. KKLT had to compete with KESZ for the soft AC audience. As it lost ratings to its rival, KKLT gradually stepped up the tempo of its music to a more mainstream adult contemporary. Despite the changes, KESZ continued to dominate in audience share.

=== KPKX (98.7 The Peak) ===
On May 28, 2004, the format was changed to adult hits as "The Peak". The call letters were switched to KPKX on May 9, 2005. KPKX became one of the first stations in the U.S. to use the format, and the first not branded as "Jack FM" or "Bob FM". The first song on "The Peak" was "A Change Would Do You Good" by Sheryl Crow.

The Peak featured the voice of actor John O'Hurley as "Mr. Peakerman", a well meaning but bumbling station owner who more or less allows the staff to play "whatever they want". The station was the brainchild of programmer Joel Grey, with writing and creative imaging produced by John Hugill. Highly successful for Bonneville, it became the de facto flagship of other properties like 95.7 Max FM in San Francisco and 106.5 The Arch in St. Louis.

=== KMVP-FM (Arizona Sports 98.7) ===
Previous logo

At 10 a.m. on January 6, 2014, after playing All The Small Things by Blink-182, and a brief goodbye message from program manager Steve Douglas, KPKX flipped to a simulcast of sports radio-formatted KTAR. On January 9, 2014, KPKX changed its call sign to KMVP-FM. KTAR-FM was already on air, so 98.7 was unable to simply copy the AM callsign.

On July 10, 2014, Bonneville announced Arizona Sports would be exclusively heard on 98.7 FM, effective September 15. KTAR then began carrying ESPN Radio full time.

== Programming ==
Dan Bickley and Vince Marotta host the morning drive time. Luke Lapinski and Ron Wolfley are heard in middays. Dave Burns and John Gambadoro are on in the afternoon. ESPN Radio is carried late nights and weekends.
