= Arizona Public Media =

Public broadcasting service of the University of Arizona

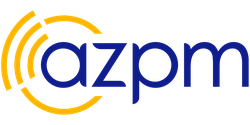
Arizona Public Media logo

Arizona Public Media (AZPM) is the public broadcasting service of the University of Arizona, providing radio and television service and regional news coverage in southern and southeastern Arizona from its studios in Tucson. AZPM encompasses two primary radio services aligned with NPR, with KUAZ and KUAZ-FM in Tucson airing news and talk programming and KUAT-FM airing classical music, and KUAT-TV "PBS 6", the PBS station for the region. (Note: All of AZPM's broadcast licenses are held by the Arizona Board of Regents (ABOR) for the benefit of the University of Arizona; ABOR also holds the licenses for the stations of Arizona State University and Northern Arizona University.) AZPM is housed in the Modern Languages Building on the UA campus on East University Boulevard.

== History ==
=== Early broadcasting activities and radio-television bureau ===
While the UA did not begin its current television and radio services until 1959 and 1968, respectively, the first broadcasting activities from the university predate both by several decades. In the fall of 1922, it began offering a radio course, with a university radio station on the way; previously, tests had been made from March to May of that year. A license was granted on December 9, 1922, for a 250-watt station on 360 meters (833 kHz) with the call sign KFDH; power was later reduced to 150 watts. By March 1923, KFDH was broadcasting on Tuesday and Thursday evenings. However, the equipment was quickly made outmoded by advances in radio technology, and in late 1925, it was reported that nearly $30,000 ($550,759 in 2025 dollars) would be needed to rebuild KFDH. The license was renewed but allowed to lapse in November 1925.

After it opted not to build its own station, the university got involved with radio program production for air on radio station KVOA. In 1939, a radio bureau was established. By 1951, UA radio offerings—each of them on a different Tucson station—included the Arizona Farm and Ranch Hour, a weekly agricultural news program; the discussion program University of Arizona Forum; University of Arizona Concert, broadcasts of the UA's choral groups; and University Sketchbook, a biography program. After beginning to produce spot news film for use by KPHO-TV in Phoenix that same year, the radio bureau became a radio-television bureau in 1953, and its output rapidly increased as more television stations started. Its expanding activities as well as an increasing offering of courses to students led to the renovation of the 1903 Herring Hall, once the UA gymnasium, into a facility with radio and television studios.

=== Becoming a station owner ===
As a result of these new facilities, when the UA applied to start a television station in 1958, most of the costs and construction related to erecting a tower and transmitter facility for the new KUAT. A 250-foot (76 m) mast was installed behind Herring Hall to hold the antenna for the channel 6 station, which began regular programming on March 8, 1959. Initially broadcasting to the immediate Tucson area, regional coverage became a reality on October 1, 1968, with the activation of a transmitter atop Mount Bigelow. The university was also expanding in radio with the launch of KUAT (1550 AM) in 1968 and KUAT-FM 90.5 in 1975. Concomitant with this expansion, the status of the radio-television bureau at the university was elevated to a department in 1971, and it began offering its own degree programs the next year.

By 1991, before the 1992 launch of a second FM service on KUAZ-FM 89.1, the broadcasting operation was known as the KUAT Communications Group. The umbrella name Arizona Public Media was adopted in 2008 to better reflect the services' connection to the university and changes in the media business.

In 2021, the UA announced it was exploring the construction of a new $45 million complex for AZPM south of the campus at The Bridges, home to Tech Parks Arizona, having already raised 75 percent of the projected cost without launching a public campaign. The university released renderings of the proposed facility, the Paul and Alice Baker Center for Public Media, in September 2023.

== Structure ==
As a division of the UA, Arizona Public Media has its own executive structure and CEO, Jack Gibson. For the fiscal year ending June 30, 2021, 14 percent of AZPM's operating and non-operating revenues came in the form of appropriations or donated support from the UA. Individual giving constituted the largest source of revenues at 26 percent, with major giving and capital gifts at 20 percent. 15 percent consisted of grants from the Corporation for Public Broadcasting.

== Radio ==
UA radio transmitters

The UA operates two primary radio services: a classical service based at KUAT-FM and a news/talk service based at KUAZ and KUAZ-FM. Both services have translators outside of the Tucson area, expanding coverage to such cities as Nogales, Sierra Vista, Bisbee, and Safford.

In 1966, John Walton donated the facility of daytime-only radio station KFIF (1550 kHz) to the university so he could purchase KTAN (580 AM), with its superior facility and signal. KFIF went off the air in May 1967 to move its programming to KTAN's frequency, and it reemerged as KUAT on September 30, 1968. KUAT radio was a charter member of NPR when it began broadcasting All Things Considered in 1971.

The UA applied at the start of 1974 to build an FM radio station that would primarily broadcast classical music; at the time, KUAT AM primarily broadcast classical and jazz music. Federal Communications Commission (FCC) approval came at year's end, delayed by issues with a treaty between the United States and Mexico, and when KUAT-FM began on May 19, 1975, the classical and news/jazz services split.

To augment and supplement the daytime-only AM station, the university successfully applied for a construction permit for 89.1 MHz in 1989. The station began broadcasting April 27, 1992, as KUAZ. The AM began simulcasting it while it was on the air, though its call sign was not changed to KUAZ until 2000. With increasing listenership to public radio's talk programming, speech programs came to supplant jazz music on KUAZ.

In addition to their analog services, the FM stations broadcast in HD Radio. KUAZ-FM carries subchannels of jazz music and the BBC World Service.

== Television ==
Map of southeastern Arizona with UA television transmitters

In 1959, the University of Arizona built KUAT-TV, the first public television station in Arizona. The original transmitter was behind Herring Hall; it remained on campus until relocating to Mount Bigelow in 1968. At that time, color programming began from the new Modern Languages Building studios. KUAT programming is today broadcast from two high-power transmitters for the Tucson area (one on Mount Bigelow with regional coverage and another on Tumamoc Hill serving parts of northwest Tucson shaded by terrain). The station produces several regular local series, including the newsmagazine Arizona Illustrated, which began production in 1980.
