= KUAT-TV =

Television station in Tucson, Arizona

KUAT-TV and KUAS-TV
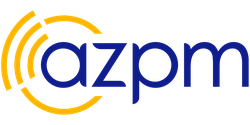

KUAT-TV: Tucson, Arizona (Mount Bigelow); KUAS-TV: Tucson, Arizona (Tumamoc Hill); United States
- Channels for KUAT-TV: Digital: 30 (UHF); Virtual: 6
- Channels for KUAS-TV: Digital: 28 (UHF); Virtual: 27
- Branding: PBS 6; AZPM

Programming
- Affiliations: 6.1/27.1: PBS; 6.2/27.2: PBS Kids; 6.3/27.3: World

Ownership
- Owner: University of Arizona; (Arizona Board of Regents for the benefit of the University of Arizona)
- Sister stations: KUAT-FM; KUAZ

History
- First air date: KUAT-TV: March 8, 1959; KUAS-TV: July 22, 1988
- Former call signs: KUAT-TV: KUAT (1959–1967)
- Former channel number: KUAT-TV: Analog: 6 (VHF, 1959–2009); KUAS-TV: Analog: 27 (UHF, 1988–2009)
- Former affiliations: KUAT-TV: NET (1959–1970); V-me (6.2, 2007–2011); Create (6.3, until 2011); KUAS-TV: V-me (27.2, 2007–2011); Create (27.3, until 2011)
- Call sign meaning: KUAT-TV: University of Arizona Television; KUAS-TV: KUAT Secondary

Technical information
- Licensing authority: FCC
- Facility ID: KUAT-TV: 2731; KUAS-TV: 2722
- ERP: KUAT-TV: 667.5 kW; KUAS-TV: 50 kW
- HAAT: KUAT-TV: 1,092.1 m (3,583 ft); KUAS-TV: 177.9 m (584 ft)
- Transmitter coordinates: KUAT-TV: 32°24′55.4″N 110°42′54.2″W; KUAS-TV: 32°12′53.2″N 111°0′23.3″W
- Translator: K20GG-D Duncan

Links
- Public license information: KUAT-TV: Public file; LMS; KUAS-TV: Public file; LMS
- Website: www.azpm.org

KUAT-TV (channel 6) is a PBS member television station in Tucson, Arizona, United States. It is owned by the University of Arizona (UA) and broadcasts from studios in the Modern Languages Building on the UA campus on East University Boulevard. Two high-power transmitters broadcast its programming: KUAT-TV itself on Mount Bigelow and KUAS-TV (channel 27) on Tumamoc Hill, west of downtown Tucson, which provides coverage to northwest Tucson and communities west of Mount Lemmon that are shielded from the Mount Bigelow transmitter. There is also a translator in Duncan. KUAT-TV and the UA's radio stations, KUAT-FM and KUAZ, are grouped under the unified brand of Arizona Public Media (AZPM).

KUAT-TV is the oldest public television station in the state, beginning broadcasts in 1959. In addition to airing national PBS and public television programming, it produces several local shows focusing on southern Arizona life and issues.

== History ==
Tucson had been allocated noncommercial educational channel 6 in 1952, but it was not until 1958 that the University of Arizona (UA) applied to build a television station to use it. They proposed to initially broadcast two hours a night, five nights a week. The university had already remodeled Herring Hall to house radio and television studios, with the latter occupying a space once used as part of a gymnasium and auditorium. Filed on April 3, the application and permit were granted by the Federal Communications Commission (FCC) on July 16, sending $40,000 ($446,367 in 2025) from the Ford Foundation to the university for equipment. After the university rejected the first two bids for the job as too high and re-bid the task out, the tower was erected in November to support the antenna for the new station; while that happened, the university made its first telecast—a closed-circuit event in which a pharmacology class watched a demonstration of techniques to measure blood pressure.

The first test pattern went out on February 6, and KUAT launched on March 8, 1959, as the first public television station in Arizona. It was an affiliate of National Educational Television (NET) from 1959 until 1970, when NET was replaced by PBS. In addition to university programs, the Tucson Unified School District was part of its operation, with a weekly show summarizing school activities. That fall, the first daytime educational broadcasts were made, consisting of university classes.

In 1964, the university prepared an expansion of the initial facility, which had an effective radiated power of 944 watts. The university applied to move its transmitter to Tumamoc Hill, which would increase coverage from a 21-mile (34 km) to a 65-mile (105 km) radius, and new studios were planned in the forthcoming Modern Languages Building. The Federal Aviation Administration approved the tower site, but the university decided to relocate its main transmitter to Mount Bigelow, already in use by the three commercial stations in town, after protests from the Air Line Pilots Association over the proximity of the mast to the Tucson International Airport. The new studios and transmitter would be capable of broadcasting in color. The Arizona Board of Regents approved the plans in April 1967, and color transmission from the new studios and transmitter began on October 1, 1968. In preparation, K71BQ, a channel 71 translator, was built at the Tumamoc Hill site to serve neighborhoods in northwest Tucson that are shaded from Mount Bigelow by terrain. A day before the color conversion, on September 30, 1968, the University of Arizona returned to radio for the first time since the 1920s after receiving the donation of KFIF (1550 AM), which became KUAT (and is now KUAZ), from John Walton. In 1977, construction work began on a satellite dish in a vacant swimming pool south of the Bear Down Gymnasium, allowing the station to receive PBS programming via satellite when it began use the next year.

KUAT-TV used a carved-block logo representing its call letters from 1981 to 2009.

In the 1980s, KUAT upgraded its service to the northwest side. As early as 1982, plans existed to replace K71BQ with a higher-power translator on channel 27. This became reality as K27AT in December 1985. As channel 27 had been designated for noncommercial full-power use, the university filed to build out a full-power facility on channel 27 in 1985; this was completed as KUAS-TV in July 1988. In 1994, KUAT-TV launched the UA Channel, a public access channel featuring university content and lectures.

After the university received a $671,000 grant ($1.2 million in 2025), the two transmitters were converted to digital in 2002 and 2003, with KUAS-TV on Tumamoc Hill being switched first and becoming the first digital television service in Tucson. The Arizona Public Media (AZPM) umbrella name for KUAT radio and television was adopted in 2009.

Steep budget cuts to higher education in Arizona strongly affected Arizona Public Media's budget during the Great Recession, as 26 percent of it came from the university. Arizona Illustrated, a formerly daily program, converted to being taped three times a week, alongside other cost-cutting measures. After providing $2.6 million in cash to AZPM in the 2013–2014 school year, the University of Arizona planned cuts for 2014–2015 of $400,000 and continued cuts until 2019.

In 2021, the UA announced it was exploring the possibility of constructing a $45 million complex for AZPM south of the campus at The Bridges, home to Tech Parks Arizona, having already raised 75 percent of the projected cost without launching a public campaign. The university released renderings of the proposed facility, the Paul and Alice Baker Center for Public Media, in September 2023. Ground was broken on the structure in January 2024, by which time the cost had increased to $65 million.

== Local programming ==
In 1980, KUAT began producing Arizona Illustrated, its flagship weekly newsmagazine on local public affairs issues, at a time when its local program production was seen as minimal outside of Tucson city council meetings. Initially aired daily, it evolved from a features show to a news and analysis program. University students handle most of the production of Arizona Illustrated.

No longer produced but still in reruns on some PBS stations is the nature documentary series The Desert Speaks, co-produced with the Arizona-Sonora Desert Museum from 1990 to 2018. It was the successor to a previous program that aired on KVOA and later KOLD-TV, which had been in production since 1953.

In 2007, KUAT produced the documentary Phoenix Mars Mission: Ashes to Ice, covering the mission of the Phoenix spacecraft, which the next year became the first of the station's productions to air nationally on PBS.

== Technical information ==
=== Subchannels ===
The stations' signals carry the same multiplex of subchannels:

Subchannels of KUAT-TV and KUAS-TV
Subchannel		Res.	Short name	Programming
KUAT-TV	KUAS-TV	Res.	Short name	Programming
6.1	27.1	720p	PBS HD	PBS
6.2	27.2	480i	KIDS	PBS Kids
6.3	27.3	480i	PBS 6+	PBS 6 Plus
40.1	40.11	1080i	KHRR-DT	Telemundo (KHRR)
40.2	40.22	480i	Exitos	TeleXitos (KHRR) (4:3)

Broadcast on behalf of another station

When KUAT and KUAS first began digital broadcasting, they did not carry all the same subchannels. Initially, four subchannels were broadcast during the day and then closed down at night to allow the transmission of one high-definition channel.

With the dropping of PBS Kids in 2005, KUAT programmed its own children's channel, KUAT Kids. On 6.3, V-me started broadcasting on November 30, 2007, while .1 and .2 were PBS in high and standard definition. On December 1, 2011, the station's affiliation with Create was dropped for an independent lifestyle channel branded Ready TV.

On October 11, 2016, AZPM began broadcasting the same subchannels from both transmitters. V-me moved to cable only from 6.2, making way for PBS Kids from the Mount Bigelow transmitter, while the UA Channel became an online-only service. ReadyTV and World programming would share the same channel .3, while PBS Kids would be on .2. In 2017, the third subchannel was changed again, this time to a new complementary service known as PBS 6 Plus, featuring re-airs of PBS and local programs and thematic program blocks.

=== Analog-to-digital transition ===
While Arizona Public Media had intended to shut off the analog signals of both KUAT-TV and KUAS-TV on June 12, 2009, the national digital transition date, KUAT-TV was removed from analog service 10 weeks earlier than expected on March 31 due to damage to the analog equipment on Mount Bigelow. The stations' digital signals remained on their pre-transition UHF channels 30 and 28, respectively, using virtual channels 6 and 27. The KUAS-TV transmitter was used as part of the SAFER Act to broadcast transition information announcements until July 12.
