= KUAT =

KUAT or Kuat may refer to:

- KUAT-TV, a television station (channel 6 digital) licensed to Tucson, Arizona, United States
- KUAT-FM, a radio station (90.5 FM) licensed to Tucson, Arizona, United States
- Kuat (Star Wars), a planet in the Star Wars universe
- Kuat or Kwat, the sun god in Kamaiuran mythology
- Kuat, a Brazilian Guarana-based soft drink, produced by The Coca-Cola Company
