= KTTU-TV =

Television station in Tucson, Arizona

- Tucson, Arizona; United States
- Channels: Digital: 19 (UHF); Virtual: 18
- Branding: CW18; My18 (18.2)

Programming
- Affiliations: 18.1: The CW; 18.2: True Crime Network/MNTV; for others, see § Subchannels

Ownership
- Owner: Tegna Inc., a subsidiary of Nexstar Media Group; (KTTU-TV, Inc.)
- Operator: Gray Media
- Sister stations: KOLD-TV, KMSB

History
- First air date: December 31, 1984
- Former call signs: KDTU (1984–1989); KTTU-TV (1989–2009); KTTU (2009–2024)
- Former channel numbers: Analog: 18 (UHF, 1984–2009)
- Former affiliations: Independent (1984–1995); UPN (1995–2006); FoxBox/4KidsTV (secondary, 2002–2008); MyNetworkTV (2006–2024, on 18.1)
- Call sign meaning: No meaning

Technical information
- Licensing authority: FCC
- Facility ID: 11908
- ERP: 480 kW
- HAAT: 1,123 m (3,684 ft)
- Transmitter coordinates: 32°24′56″N 110°42′52″W

Links
- Public license information: Public file; LMS

KTTU-TV (channel 18) is a television station in Tucson, Arizona, United States, serving as the market's outlet for The CW. It is owned by the Tegna subsidiary of Nexstar Media Group alongside Fox affiliate KMSB (channel 11) and operated by Gray Media, owner of CBS affiliate KOLD-TV (channel 13). The three stations share studios on North Business Park Drive on the northwest side of Tucson (near the Casas Adobes neighborhood); KTTU-TV's transmitter is located atop Mount Bigelow.

Channel 18 was built by the Roman Catholic Diocese of Tucson and began broadcasting at the end of 1984 as KDTU. The station, intended as a family-friendly outlet, proved to be a popular—but commercial—independent station, as well as a boondoggle for the diocese, which lost $15 million between 1984 and 1989 and unloaded it at a loss to Clear Channel Communications. The call sign was changed to KTTU-TV after the sale. Since 1991, KMSB and KTTU have been either commonly operated or owned. The station was affiliated with UPN from 1995 to 2006 and MyNetworkTV before becoming Tucson's CW affiliate in 2024.

== History ==
=== Construction and diocesan ownership ===
In 1980, the Federal Communications Commission (FCC) received four applications proposing new commercial television stations on channel 18 in Tucson. Tucson Telecasting, a subsidiary of McKinnon Broadcasting (one part-owner, Clinton D. McKinnon, had owned KVOA-TV from 1955 to 1962); National Group Telecommunications, whose owners were busy building KSTS in San Jose, California; and Alden Communications Group all made bids, as did the Roman Catholic Diocese of Tucson. While the three companies, all with out-of-state interests, eyed independent stations that would primarily compete with regional independent KZAZ, the diocese was motivated to file an application because its own studies found that a cable television channel would reach fewer homes. Its application proposed mostly religious programming, and the diocese boasted that it would be the first in the country to directly own a television station.

The diocese almost dropped out months later when it indicated interest in noncommercial reserved channel 27. However, it stayed with the channel 18 application and, after a settlement agreement with McKinnon, came out the winner in March 1983. The call sign KDTU was chosen, and studios were built on North 6th Avenue in Tucson. Original proposals called for a station heavy on community involvement and also catering to the majority-Hispanic diocese. Fred Allison, a market veteran from KVOA, was tapped to help program the new station; the chief engineer was a priest, the Rev. Michael Bucciarelli. As it turned out, KDTU would be more secular than it had ever planned.

Tucson's independent television market was in the middle of rapid change. Nearly immediately after KDTU went on the air on December 31, 1984, in a debut marred by transmitter problems, Tucson got its second new station in a week: KPOL (channel 40). (The two stations shared the same transmitter site in the Tucson Mountains, a 150-foot (46 m) mast painted sky blue to reduce its visual impact in an attempt to mollify property owners, and both faced unexpected setbacks getting electric service.) Despite this, the diocese projected its new station would break even within three or four years after an initial $3 million investment.

Tucson was not big enough for three independent stations—KDTU, KPOL, and KMSB, which was sold at the same time as the other two launched, rebranded, and given an infusion of cash—at a time when programming costs for this type of station were soaring nationally. Even though KDTU had more of a commercial flavor than had been intended in the pursuit of being financially sustainable, channel 18 was a drain on the diocese, frequently overbidding on syndicated shows, and its attempts to attract commercial production clients were largely ineffective, with most firms seeking out companies in Phoenix and Los Angeles. A third of the staff was cut in March 1987. Four months later, the diocese announced it would put channel 18 on the market, saying some of its programming was not a match for its mission and noting that, in trying to build the station they sought to create, the diocese was exposed to financial and philosophical pressures. (The only religious program the station aired was the Sunday Mass, which had been on KOLD-TV.) In a letter, Bishop Manuel Duran Moreno admitted to priests that the diocese had been trying to sell the station since January 1986, 18 months prior to publicly disclosing it was on the block. Trying to keep the station going was so financially taxing that the diocese neared its credit limit and had to halt building programs at its parishes. Further trouble was created when some programs the station aired, such as The Morton Downey Jr. Show, proved to not be family-friendly, generating criticism and ultimately leading to it being pulled from KDTU.

On October 21, 1988, the diocese terminated 14 employees and slashed the pay of its administrative staff by 10 percent, cutting clergy and religious support services in the process, as a result of KDTU's financial losses. While none of the station's 42 employees were affected in that set of cuts, less than two weeks later, the diocese had worse news for them: it was giving KDTU its last rites and taking it off the air on November 1. In the meantime, however, a prospective buyer emerged, and the diocese agreed to keep KDTU going while it was in negotiations. McKinnon retained a right of first refusal to match any buyer's offer from its settlement agreement years prior.

We had the best intentions. It was a good idea of bringing family entertainment to television, giving good programs that teach about the church, that teach about morality, about what's right, what's wrong. We were not in it for the money. We were in it for the service.

— Bishop Manuel Duran Moreno

On November 3, the diocese signed a letter of intent with Clear Channel Television of Houston to purchase KDTU for $8.5 million: $2.5 million in cash and $6 million in liabilities. It was Clear Channel's second television property, having recently bought WPMI-TV in Mobile, Alabama. McKinnon did not exercise its right of first refusal, citing the "horrendous" sum that would have been needed to make KDTU competitive, and FCC approval was granted in January 1989. Clear Channel's final agreement called for a $2.25 million cash payment, and the company was able to whittle down its liabilities to $4 million by renegotiating programming contracts. Meanwhile, the diocese was left with a loss of more than $15 million from its venture into television. It took a decade to reduce a deficit that had been $33 million in 1987 to $5.2 million by 1998.

=== KTTU ===
On April 10, 1989, KDTU became KTTU-TV in an effort to separate the station from its diocesan past. A new promotional campaign and marketing blitz were rolled out, and the station's programming was changed to focus on movies. KDTU was no longer part of a money-losing diocese, but it was still in an oversaturated television marketplace that was generally agreed to have one station too many. KPOL exited when it closed in October: the fact that its owners had not anticipated KDTU being a competitor was cited as one reason for its failure. KTTU-TV was something of an odd station out in Clear Channel's Fox affiliate-heavy TV portfolio. In a 1990 feature story for Channels magazine, Clear Channel Television president Dan Sullivan said, "Most would say its performance is great. For us, though, it's average. If I had it to do over again, would I buy it? No comment."

In September 1991, Mountain States Broadcasting, a subsidiary of the Providence Journal Corporation and owner of KMSB, signed a time brokerage agreement with Clear Channel. KMSB-TV moved into KTTU-TV's studios on 6th Avenue, and Mountain States began programming and selling all advertising time across both stations and providing other services to Clear Channel. The station signed up for UPN before its 1995 launch. Beyond UPN, KTTU continued with a mix of syndicated programs, sports, and two public affairs programs on Tucson issues.

In 1997, the Belo Corporation purchased the Providence Journal Corporation; Belo then purchased KTTU-TV outright from Clear Channel in 2002. Many operations for the Tucson pair under Belo, outside of advertising, were run from KTVK in Phoenix.

KTTU's logo as a MyNetworkTV affiliate

UPN and The WB merged into The CW in 2006. KTTU-TV management analyzed joining the new network but found that, compared to its existing arrangements, it would have had to give up control of valuable advertising time in the afternoon, which it found to not fit their business needs; KWBA-TV joined The CW, while KTTU picked up MyNetworkTV.

In November 2011, Belo announced that it would enter into a shared services agreement with Raycom Media beginning in February 2012. This outsourcing arrangement resulted in CBS affiliate KOLD-TV taking over daily non-sales operations of KMSB and KTTU and moving their advertising sales department into KOLD's studios. Those same service agreements were carried over to Gray Television when it bought out and absorbed Raycom at the start of 2019. All remaining positions at the two stations were eliminated and master control moved from KTVK in Phoenix to KOLD.

On June 13, 2013, the Gannett Company announced that it would acquire Belo. However, since Gannett held a partial ownership stake in the publisher of the Arizona Daily Star, the KMSB license was instead acquired by Sander Media, LLC, owned by former Belo executive Jack Sander. The KTTU license was acquired by Tucker Operating Co., LLC, owned by former president and CEO of Fisher Communications Ben Tucker, as there were too few unique owners of commercial TV stations in the market to permit the duopoly to continue under FCC regulations. Tucker had previously owned WGTU in Traverse City, Michigan, in a similar capacity. The sale was completed on December 23.

In 2015, Gannett split into print and broadcast companies—the latter known as Tegna—and repurchased the Sander stations. Tegna acquired the station outright in 2019 for a net payment to Tucker of $171,000.

KTTU became the market's CW affiliate on September 1, 2024; the change occurred after Nexstar Media Group, which took over as majority owner of the network, declined to renew existing affiliations groupwide with KWBA owner E. W. Scripps Company.

Nexstar acquired Tegna in a deal announced in August 2025 and completed in March 2026.

== Technical information ==
=== Subchannels ===
KTTU-TV's transmitter is located atop Mount Bigelow. The station's signal is multiplexed:

Subchannels of KTTU-TV
Subchannel	Res.	Short name	Programming
18.1	1080i	KTTU-HD	The CW
18.2	480i	Nest	True Crime Network (primary); MyNetworkTV (secondary)
18.3	480i	H&I	The Nest
18.4	480i	StartTV	Start TV
18.5	480i	OPEN	Heroes & Icons
18.6	480i	HSN	HSN
18.7	480i	Quest	Antenna TV (soon)

=== Analog-to-digital conversion ===
The digital transmission facility, shared with other Tucson stations, was built on Mount Bigelow in 2003. The analog transmitter was shut down early on January 18, 2009, owing to equipment failure; KTTU continued broadcasting digitally on UHF channel 19, using virtual channel 18.
