= Bally Sports Arizona =

American regional sports network (1996–2023)

- Type: Regional sports network
- Country: United States
- Broadcast area: Arizona; New Mexico; Utah; Southern Nevada; Nationwide (via satellite)
- Network: Bally Sports
- Headquarters: Phoenix, Arizona

Programming
- Language: English
- Picture format: 720p (HDTV); 480i (SDTV)

Ownership
- Owner: Sinclair Broadcast Group and Entertainment Studios
- Parent: Diamond Sports Group

History
- Launched: September 7, 1996
- Closed: October 21, 2023
- Former names: Fox Sports Arizona (1996–1999, 2008–2021); Fox Sports Net Arizona (1999–2004); FSN Arizona (2004–2008)

Bally Sports Arizona (BSAZ) was an American regional sports network (RSN). The channel broadcast professional, collegiate and high school sports events, with a primary focus on Phoenix-area teams. It was available on most cable providers throughout Arizona and available nationwide on satellite provider DirecTV.

The network was launched as Fox Sports Arizona on September 7, 1996, through a partnership between News Corporation and Liberty Media. It was the first regional sports network branded as Fox Sports after the creation of Fox Sports Net from what had been the Prime Network group of RSNs. Fox Sports Arizona was the cable television home of the Phoenix Coyotes of the National Hockey League when they began play that October and of the Arizona Diamondbacks of Major League Baseball when that team began play in 1998. In addition, Fox Sports Arizona carried college sports as well as Arizona high school sports. The Phoenix Suns of the National Basketball Association moved their cable games to the network in 2003 after 22 years of association with Cox Communications and its predecessors and their RSN, the Arizona Sports and Programming Network (later renamed Cox Sports, Cox 9, Cox 7, and YurView Arizona).

On March 31, 2021, the network was rebranded Bally Sports Arizona after the network was purchased by Diamond Sports Group, a joint venture between the Sinclair Broadcast Group and Entertainment Studios. Diamond filed for bankruptcy protection in February 2023. The Arizona RSN lost money for Bally, which opted to drop all three professional teams. Under new Suns and Phoenix Mercury team owner Mat Ishbia, both the Suns and Mercury signed a deal to move their games to broadcast stations owned by Gray Television on April 20, 2023. While this deal was stayed by a bankruptcy judge for the Suns (the Mercury were unaffected by the judge's ruling), Bally ultimately cut ties with the Suns after failing to match Gray's offer on July 14. On July 18, Major League Baseball took over production and distribution of telecasts for the Diamondbacks after Diamond missed a second payment for the Diamondbacks during the 2023 season. On October 4, Bally Sports cut ties with the Coyotes; the team signed a deal with Scripps Sports a day later, ahead of the start of the 2023–24 season.

Bally Sports Arizona signed off for the final time on October 21, 2023.

== History ==
On March 21, 1996, two teams new to the market, the expansion Arizona Diamondbacks of Major League Baseball and the relocating original Winnipeg Jets of the National Hockey League (which became the Phoenix, later Arizona Coyotes), announced ten-year deals with Fox/Liberty Sports to telecast 60 baseball games and 40 hockey games a season. The partnership between News Corporation and Liberty Media had been formed several months earlier. Liberty owned the Prime Sports group of regional sports networks, whose programming was seen in Arizona on the Cox Communications–owned Arizona Sports Programming Network (ASPN). The name for the new network was to have been Prime Sports Arizona, but following the announcement to rebrand Liberty's Prime Sports Networks and form Fox Sports Net, the name was changed to Fox Sports Arizona (FSAZ).

Fox Sports Arizona was launched on September 7, 1996, with the first game on the network being Arizona State University's 45–42 win over its Pac-10 rival, Washington. The first Coyotes game was broadcast on October 18; the Diamondbacks would join the network a year and a half later for their inaugural 1998 season. The network also televised high school football and basketball state championships. The other major team in the market, the Phoenix Suns of the National Basketball Association, had been telecast by ASPN since 1981; the team remained with ASPN and its successors, Cox Sports and Cox 9, until 2003, when Fox Sports Arizona acquired rights.

A secondary feed, branded as FSN Arizona Plus, was first used in 2007 to manage conflicts between a Suns playoff game and a Diamondbacks game. It returned in 2008 for the same purpose. By 2011, it was a full-time channel on most cable providers. In 2021 and 2022, a third feed, known as Bally Sports Arizona Extra, was necessary due to overlapping NBA, NHL, and MLB games.

Fox Sports Arizona logo, used from 2008 to 2012

Former Fox Sports Arizona logo, used from 2012 to 2021

On December 14, 2017, as part of a merger between both companies, The Walt Disney Company announced plans to acquire all 22 regional Fox Sports networks from 21st Century Fox, including Fox Sports Arizona. However, on June 27, 2018, the Justice Department ordered their divestment under antitrust grounds, citing Disney's ownership of ESPN. On May 3, 2019, Sinclair Broadcast Group and Entertainment Studios (through their joint venture, Diamond Sports Group) bought the Fox Sports Networks from The Walt Disney Company for $10.6 billion. The deal closed on August 22, 2019. On March 31, 2021, coinciding with the start of the 2021 Major League Baseball season, Fox Sports Arizona was rebranded as Bally Sports Arizona, as part of a branding agreement with commercial casino operator Bally's Corporation.

=== Bankruptcy and shutdown ===
On February 15, 2023, Diamond Sports Group, the owner of Bally Sports Arizona, failed to make a $140 million interest payment, instead opting for a 30-day grace period to make the payment. On March 14, 2023, Diamond Sports Group filed for Chapter 11 bankruptcy protection.

In the months that followed, Diamond Sports lost all of its Arizona-market professional sports rights. During its bankruptcy, Diamond missed a payment to the Diamondbacks. On April 5, 2023, the Diamondbacks filed an emergency motion asking the bankruptcy judge to order Diamond to pay the Diamondbacks fully or give its media rights back to Major League Baseball. Diamond argued that, because of cord-cutting, the contract rate for the media rights of the teams was too high. A hearing on the matter was set for May 31, 2023. As an interim, on April 19, the bankruptcy judge ordered Diamond Sports to pay 50% of what the Diamondbacks were owed. On June 1, after a two-day long hearing, the bankruptcy judge ordered Diamond to pay the Diamondbacks fully within five days. On June 22, 2023, Diamond Sports announced its intention to reject Bally Sports Arizona's contract with the Diamondbacks on June 30, 2023. On July 18, Diamond was granted a motion to decline its contract with the team. Major League Baseball subsequently took over production and distribution of Diamondbacks telecasts (not unlike its takeover of a fellow Bally Sports property, the San Diego Padres, in May). For the rest of the Diamondbacks season, MLB-produced telecasts were offered by local cable providers, including by Cox on its YurView Arizona channels in the Phoenix and Tucson regions.

Under new owner Mat Ishbia, the Phoenix Suns and Phoenix Mercury of the WNBA had telegraphed an interest in moving on from Bally Sports Arizona. In an April 2023 interview with the Phoenix Business Journal, team CEO Josh Bartelstein cited a "goal of wide distribution" for the teams in the face of cord cutting affecting the availability of RSNs. On April 28, the Suns and Mercury announced a deal with Gray Television to put its regional games on broadcast television, under a five-year agreement for the Suns and a two-year agreement for the Phoenix Mercury, replacing Bally Sports Arizona for their upcoming seasons. Diamond subsequently accused the team of breaching its contract and bankruptcy law. On May 10, 2023, the bankruptcy judge voided the Suns contract with Gray, ruling that the Suns violated Bally Sports Arizona's contractual right of first refusal. He ordered the parties into arbitration. The Phoenix Mercury portion of the deal was not affected by the ruling, allowing the team to move its games to Gray-owned KTVK and Arizona's Family Sports for the 2023 season. On July 14, the Suns announced that the Gray deal would go ahead, as Diamond Sports Group declined to match the contract.

Without the Diamondbacks and Suns, Bally Sports only had rights to the Coyotes. On October 4, Diamond Sports announced its intention to reject Bally Sports Arizona's contract with the hockey team, with the Coyotes signing a new contract with Scripps Sports the next day. Under the Scripps Sports umbrella, the Coyotes would air regular season games throughout both the states of Arizona and Utah during the 2023–24 season. This move meant that Bally Sports Arizona no longer held the broadcast rights to any professional sports teams in the state of Arizona.

On October 13, after losing the rights to Suns, Diamondbacks and Coyotes, Bally Sports Arizona posted on social media that it no longer held the rights to any local professional teams and would begin to wind down with the natural expiration of its carriage agreements. Its closure left the Phoenix metropolitan area, the 11th-largest media market in the country, without a traditional regional sports network.

== Sports rights ==
In addition to the Coyotes (1996–2023), Diamondbacks (1998–2023), and Suns (2003–2023), Fox Sports/Bally Sports Arizona held other local sports rights in its history:

- Beginning in 1997, Fox Sports Arizona aired Arizona Interscholastic Association high school sporting events including state championships in football and basketball. The deal ended after 2001, when Cox 9 became the sole rightsholder by pledging to cover more state championship events. Fox Sports resumed airing the state championships in 2011. In later years, live telecasts were replaced by tape-delayed re-airs of games originally streamed on a subscription service. Arizona's Family replaced Bally Sports as the AIA's broadcast partner for the 2022-23 school year.
- Fox Sports Arizona became the home of selected Arizona Wildcats sporting events in 1999, with the University of Arizona being the last Pac-10 school to move from a broadcast carrier (KTTU-TV in Tucson) to cable. This lasted until 2009, when the university launched the Arizona Wildcats Sports Network with games airing on KGUN-TV and KWBA in the Tucson market and KAZT-TV in the Phoenix market.
- Beginning in 2007, Fox Sports Arizona aired New Mexico State Aggies athletic events, mostly produced by the school, as one of several distributors eventually alongside Altitude Sports and Entertainment, cable provider Comcast, and KVIA-TV in El Paso, Texas.
- Northern Arizona University aired football and basketball games on Fox Sports Arizona, primarily university-produced telecasts.
- In the 2022 season, it was the local broadcaster of Phoenix Rising FC soccer games.

In Southern Arizona, including Tucson, Bally Sports Arizona Extra aired San Diego Padres games and related programming produced by its Bally Sports San Diego to select cable providers in that region until MLB took over that team's broadcast rights.

== Former on-air staff ==
- Steve Berthiaume – Diamondbacks play-by-play announcer
- Greg Schulte – Diamondbacks fill-in play-by-play announcer
- Bob Brenly – Diamondbacks color commentator
- Luis Gonzalez – Diamondbacks backup color commentator
- Tom Candiotti – Diamondbacks backup color commentator
- Jody Jackson – Diamondbacks and Coyotes studio host and Diamondbacks field reporter
- Kate Longworth – Diamondbacks field reporter
- Todd Walsh – Diamondbacks and Coyotes studio host
- Joe Borowski – Diamondbacks studio analyst
- Brandon Webb – Diamondbacks studio analyst
- Kevin Ray – Suns play-by-play announcer
- Eddie Johnson – Suns color commentator
- Ann Meyers – Suns color commentator
- Tom Leander – Suns backup play-by-play and studio host
- Tom Chambers – Suns studio analyst
- Matt McConnell – Coyotes play-by-play announcer
- Tyson Nash – Coyotes color analyst
- Paul Bissonnette – Coyotes studio analyst
