= Channel 77 =

Channel 77 may refer to:

- An Australian digital television channel used by Seven Network to broadcast TV listings, news and weather
- A former NTSC-M channel, removed from television use in 1983 and originally used by stations in North America which broadcast on 848-854 MHz. In the United States, channels 70-83 were rarely used and served primarily as a "translator band" of small repeater transmitters rebroadcasting existing stations:
  - KTVX-TV (ABC Salt Lake City), a rebroadcaster K77AJ Delta, Utah was moved to K35GC channel 35
  - KGUN (ABC Tucson), a rebroadcaster K77BX Casas Adobes, Arizona is now K02BW channel 2
  - KOAT-TV (ABC Albuquerque), a rebroadcaster K77AA Bayfield, Colorado moved to K36FA channel 36
  - KOIN-TV (CBS Portland), a rebroadcasters K77AH Cottage Grove, Oregon and K77BG Rockaway, Oregon were moved to K47AV channel 47 and K41GG channel 41 respectively
  - KSTP-TV (ABC Saint Paul), a rebroadcaster K77AI Redwood Falls, Minnesota moved to K60AO channel 60
  - KUTV-TV (NBC Salt Lake City), a rebroadcaster K77CA Santa Clara, Utah moved to K49AS channel 49
  - KXLY-TV (ABC Spokane), a rebroadcaster K77AO Quincy, Washington was moved to K24AI channel 24
  - KTVR-TV (PBS La Grande), a rebroadcaster K77AP Pendleton, Oregon moved to K59BO channel 59 (now K25OO-D, channel 25)
  - WOAI-TV (NBC San Antonio), a rebroadcaster K77CN Camp Wood, Texas is now K55CZ channel 55
