= Stella Inger =

American journalist

Stella Inger Escobedo
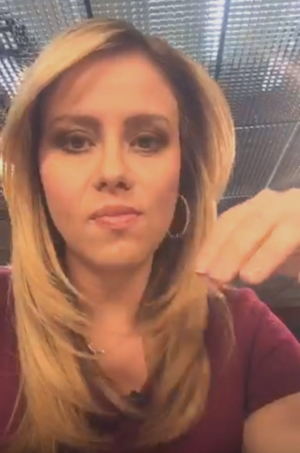
- Stella Inger from the newsroom at KGUN
- Born: 1983 (age 42–43); Tashkent, Uzbek SSR
- Spouse: Gilbert Escobedo
- Children: 2

Stella Inger Escobedo is an American television news anchor and reporter who worked at One America News Network from 2022 to 2025. She was also formerly at KFMB, the CBS affiliate in San Diego where she was the morning and afternoon anchor.

== Early life ==
Inger-Escobedo was born to an Ashkenazi Jewish family in Tashkent, Uzbek SSR (today in Uzbekistan). Her parents immigrated when she was six in 1989, first to Sioux City, Iowa, and then Southern California. She grew up in Sherman Oaks, California. In 2004, she graduated from the University of Southern California where she was a broadcast journalism major.

== Career ==
Inger-Escobedo joined CBS 8 after a short stint at CBS Newspath in Los Angeles as a network correspondent. Previously she was the 5, 6, and 10 p.m anchor at the ABC television affiliate, KGUN, channel 9, in Tucson, Arizona. Inger-Escobedo was employed by the station in 2013, and retired from her position there on November 30, 2018. Previously, she was the morning anchor/reporter of "Good Morning Arizona" on KTVK in Phoenix. Inger was the leading morning anchor for KPSP-TV in Palm Springs, California, from 2008 to 2013.

Before reporting for KPSP-LP, Inger was a reporter for KXLF-TV in Bozeman, Montana and KESQ-TV in Palm Desert, California.

In 2008, Inger was named by The Desert Sun as "The Best TV Personality in the Desert." In 2009 she won the same award for the second time. In December 2008, Inger was featured alongside Kobe Bryant and Shaquille O'Neal in an AOL Sports report.

Inger-Escobedo was the leading morning anchor for KPSP-LP (CBS-TV) in Palm Springs, California. In September 2012 and September 2011, Inger co-hosted the Chabad Telethon along with CNN's Larry King and KTLA's Sam Rubin. She also co-hosted the Chabad Telethon in 2009 alongside celebrities including Oscar award winner Jon Voight, actor Tom Arnold and NBA star Jordan Farmar.
