= KVOA =

Television station in Tucson, Arizona

- Tucson, Arizona; United States
- Channels: Digital: 23 (UHF); Virtual: 4
- Branding: KVOA 4 Tucson; News 4 Tucson

Programming
- Affiliations: 4.1: NBC; for others, see § Subchannels

Ownership
- Owner: Allen Media Group; (Tucson TV License Company, LLC)

History
- First air date: September 27, 1953
- Former call signs: KVOA-TV (1953–1996)
- Former channel numbers: Analog: 4 (VHF, 1953–2009)
- Former affiliations: Both secondary: ABC (1953–1957); NTA (1956–1961)
- Call sign meaning: "Voice of Arizona", from the former radio station

Technical information
- Licensing authority: FCC
- Facility ID: 25735
- ERP: 405 kW
- HAAT: 1,123 m (3,684 ft)
- Transmitter coordinates: 32°24′56″N 110°42′52″W
- Translator(s): K17PF-D Casas Adobes; K28OY-D Sierra Vista

Links
- Public license information: Public file; LMS
- Website: kvoa.com

KVOA (channel 4) is a television station in Tucson, Arizona, United States, affiliated with NBC and owned by Allen Media Group. The station's studios are located on West Elm Street north of downtown Tucson, and its primary transmitter is located atop Mount Bigelow, northeast of the city, supplemented by translators in the Tucson Mountains and in Sierra Vista.

KVOA-TV, originally associated with KVOA radio, went on the air in September 1953 as Tucson's second television station. The station was an NBC affiliate from the start; early owners included KTAR in Phoenix, Clinton D. McKinnon, and the Pulitzer Publishing Company. Pulitzer had to divest the television station to purchase the Arizona Daily Star newspaper; this transaction was prolonged by issues with the potential buyer at the Federal Communications Commission. In 1973, KVOA was purchased by a local ownership group that led the station to ratings leadership in local news for nearly 30 years, from the mid-1970s to the early 2000s. Allen acquired KVOA in 2021, the second sale of the station in four years owing to ownership conflicts from a merger. The station produces more than 39 hours a week of local news programming.

== History ==
=== Early years ===
From October 1948 to April 1952, the Federal Communications Commission (FCC) imposed a freeze on the award of new television stations to revise technical standards. With the end of the freeze imminent, activity began around television in Tucson, and three Tucson radio stations applied for three television channels. The Arizona Broadcasting Company, owner of KVOA (1290 AM), filed for channel 4 without opposition on February 7, 1952, and was granted a construction permit to build on November 12. KVOA, Tucson's NBC-affiliated radio station, selected channel 4 because it was preferred by RCA and because NBC-owned stations in major cities, including New York, Los Angeles, and Washington, D.C., were on channel 4.

By the start of 1953, KVOA had announced its television plans. At the station's radio transmitter site at Lee Street and 10th Avenue, work would begin on studios, and the AM radio tower would be rebuilt to accommodate a television antenna. KVOA-TV had set a September 15 start date for launch, and construction proceeded uneventfully, but it opted to wait because it would be nearly two weeks after that when network coaxial cable service would be available in Tucson for the first time. The station began broadcasting September 27, 1953, and its initial offering was the first TV program piped in to Tucson by coaxial cable. In addition to NBC programs, it carried a secondary affiliation with ABC; ABC's radio affiliate in Tucson, KCNA, had planned a station but bowed out.

Arizona Broadcasting Company, a subsidiary of KTAR radio and KVAR television in Phoenix, opted to exit Tucson broadcasting in 1955 and sold KVOA radio and television to Clinton D. McKinnon of San Diego for $515,000. Under McKinnon, KVOA-TV was the first to broadcast in color in Tucson, in November 1956. ABC programs moved off of channel 4 in March 1957, when a third station, KDWI-TV, was sold and became KGUN-TV, acquiring the ABC affiliation. Some of this program void was filled by the NTA Film Network, for which KVOA-TV had signed up at its launch the year before. McKinnon sold the radio station to Sherwood Gordon in 1958, keeping KVOA-TV and merging it with Alvarado Television, owner of KOAT-TV in Albuquerque, New Mexico, the next year. The transmitter was moved to Mount Bigelow in 1961, concurrently with KOLD-TV (channel 13); the change put all three commercial stations on the mountaintop site.

Several of the partners in Alvarado, in ill health and wishing to liquidate their holdings, pushed McKinnon to sell Alvarado Television in 1962. KVOA-TV and KOAT-TV were sold to Steinman Stations of Lancaster, Pennsylvania, headed by Clair McCollough, for $3.5 million, with FCC approval coming in January 1963. Steinman owned the Tucson station for five years before selling it in 1968 to the Pulitzer Publishing Company, publishers of the St. Louis Post-Dispatch and owners of KSD radio and television in that city, for $3 million.

=== Channel 4-TV ownership ===
An antitrust lawsuit involving the two daily newspapers in Tucson would have an impact on KVOA-TV. In 1971, a six-year antitrust lawsuit brought by the United States Department of Justice concluded in the sale of the morning Arizona Daily Star—which had been owned by the publisher of Tucson's afternoon daily, the Tucson Daily Citizen—to Pulitzer; negotiations for Pulitzer to purchase the newspaper had been ongoing for months, but while an agreement had been reached, final details relating to KVOA-TV's fate remained uncertain. To acquire the Daily Star, the Department of Justice required Pulitzer to sell KVOA-TV within a year.

In mid-May, the sale of the television station to Donrey Media Group of Arkansas, whose holdings included television stations in Arkansas and Las Vegas and Reno, Nevada, was announced. However, Donrey would be embroiled in a series of issues at the FCC that held up consideration of the KVOA-TV transfer. By January 1972, the Donrey TV stations were being investigated for a practice called "clipping", in which network credits or commercials would be clipped out of broadcast and replaced with local commercials. KORK-TV, the Donrey station in Las Vegas, was facing a license renewal challenge. By May, per a report in Broadcasting magazine, FCC staff were recommending hearings be convened to analyze revocation of Donrey's television station licenses and would likely require a hearing to approve the Tucson TV station purchase. This threatened to prolong any sale attempt to Donrey at a time when Pulitzer was under a court order to find a buyer. In April, Pulitzer asked the Department of Justice for more time to sell KVOA-TV, after which it was granted another extension in June; however, if it could not sell the station by April 1973, Pulitzer would have to sell the Star, and the television station would be placed in trusteeship. Meanwhile, the commission's actions were putting the nails in the coffin of a Donrey sale, as the Las Vegas station's license renewal was designated for hearing later in June, and Pulitzer called off the Donrey deal on June 8, 1972.

In late June, a consortium of two Tucsonans—Don Diamond and Don Pitt—and California investor Richard L. Bloch filed to buy KVOA-TV. The FCC approved in November 1972, and the new owners, incorporated as Channel 4-TV, took over in January 1973, making KVOA-TV the only locally owned television station in Tucson. A year and a half later, Jon Ruby left the general sales manager post at WLS-TV in Chicago to take the job of general manager at KVOA-TV. He would remain in the position for 28 years and lead the station's transformation in the area of news, driving it from the lowest-rated news outlet in town to a period of ratings leadership that would last from November 1976, when KVOA passed KOLD-TV in news ratings, until 2004. In doing so, KVOA was able to buck the NBC network's declining fortunes as that network slumped into third place under the leadership of Fred Silverman. Despite its network being in third place, from 1976 to 1977, KVOA-TV increased its prime time audience by 32 percent.

=== Post/Cordillera ownership ===
The KVOA logo used from 1979 to 2000, covering much of the station's period as Tucson's market leader

The station was acquired by H&C Communications—owned by the Hobby family of Houston, publishers of the Houston Post—in 1982, after the Diamond consortium opted to sell. The Hobby family was the only prospective buyer contacted, spending $30 million to purchase KVOA-TV. Ruby remained as general manager, and the station continued its leadership, being first to introduce stereo broadcasting and closed captioning in Tucson. H&C began to liquidate its television stations in 1992. A deal was reached to sell KVOA and four of its sister stations (KPRC-TV in Houston, KSAT-TV in San Antonio, WESH in Orlando, and KCCI-TV in Des Moines) to Young Broadcasting that year, but it was canceled due to lack of financing for Young to proceed with the purchase. The following year, KVOA was sold to the Evening Post Publishing Company (through its Cordillera Communications subsidiary). It became the largest television property owned by Cordillera.

==== Super Bowl XLIII porn incident ====
During Super Bowl XLIII on February 1, 2009, Comcast's standard-definition transmission of the station was interrupted for approximately 37 seconds replacing KVOA's broadcast of the game with hardcore pornography, affecting Comcast's analog subscribers in portions of the Tucson area. The substitution appeared to have been made at Comcast, not at KVOA, and only affected the standard-definition signal; KVOA's feed in high definition, as well as the station's digital and analog over-the-air signals and feeds to other cable and satellite providers, were unaffected. On February 4, 2011, Frank Tanori Gonzalez was arrested by the Tucson Police and the FBI after suspicion of computer tampering connected with the sudden incident. Gonzalez then pleaded guilty and was sentenced to three years probation.

=== Two spinoffs in three years ===
On October 29, 2018, Cordillera announced the sale of its entire station group to the E. W. Scripps Company. Scripps could not acquire KVOA, since it already owned KGUN-TV and KWBA-TV; as a result, KVOA was sold to Quincy Media in a secondary deal for $70 million. The transaction was approved by the FCC on April 5, 2019, and was completed on May 1 of that year.

On February 1, 2021, less than two years after KVOA was acquired by Quincy, Gray Television announced it had purchased Quincy Media for $925 million. As Gray already owned KOLD-TV and both stations rank among the top four in ratings in the Tucson market, KVOA was put up for sale; on April 29, 2021, it was announced that Los Angeles–based Allen Media Group would acquire KVOA and the remaining Quincy stations not being acquired by Gray Television for $380 million. The sale was completed on August 2.

On June 1, 2025, amid financial woes and rising debt, Allen Media Group announced that it would explore "strategic options" for the company, such as a sale of its television stations (including KVOA).

== News operation ==
As part of the revamp of KVOA's news service in the mid-1970s, Ruby introduced many trappings associated with the ABC-owned stations' newscasts, including the Eyewitness News moniker and use of Lalo Schifrin's Tar Sequence as the theme music; the main evening newscast was expanded to a full hour. In addition, KVOA was the first local station to use electronic news gathering and the first to own a satellite truck. Often, KVOA's ratings equaled or surpassed those of KGUN and KOLD combined. It was not until the mid-2000s, after Ruby's retirement in 2002, when KVOA's ratings fell off as KOLD's surged. Patty Weiss, who had been part of the anchor team that helped KVOA surge to first place 30 years prior, retired in 2005.

The logo of Southern Arizona News Network

Under Cordillera ownership, KVOA experimented with two extensions to its news service. The first was providing support to KMSB's 9 p.m. newscast, which used resources from KVOA and KTVK in Phoenix and launched in 2003. The station also operated the "Southern Arizona News Network", a local 24-hour cable channel on the Cox Communications system, featuring live and repeat KVOA newscasts; this operated from 2007 to 2010.

A round of job cuts by Allen Media Group in 2024 led to the dismissals of nine employees, including the sports director and a 58-year station veteran who had been its first news photographer.

On January 17, 2025, Allen Media Group announced plans to cut local meteorologist/weather forecaster positions from its stations, including KVOA, and replacing them with a "weather hub" produced by The Weather Channel, which AMG also owns. The decision was reversed within a week by management in response to "viewer and advertiser reaction".

=== Notable current on-air staff ===
- Sean Mooney – anchor

=== Notable former on-air staff ===
- Christine Devine – morning news anchor (1988–1990); now at KTTV in Los Angeles
- Savannah Guthrie – current co-anchor of The Today Show
- Dan Hicks – NBC sportscaster
- Mary Kim Titla – ran for Congress in 2008; publishes Native Youth Magazine
- Lou Waters – joined CNN when launched in 1980

== Technical information ==
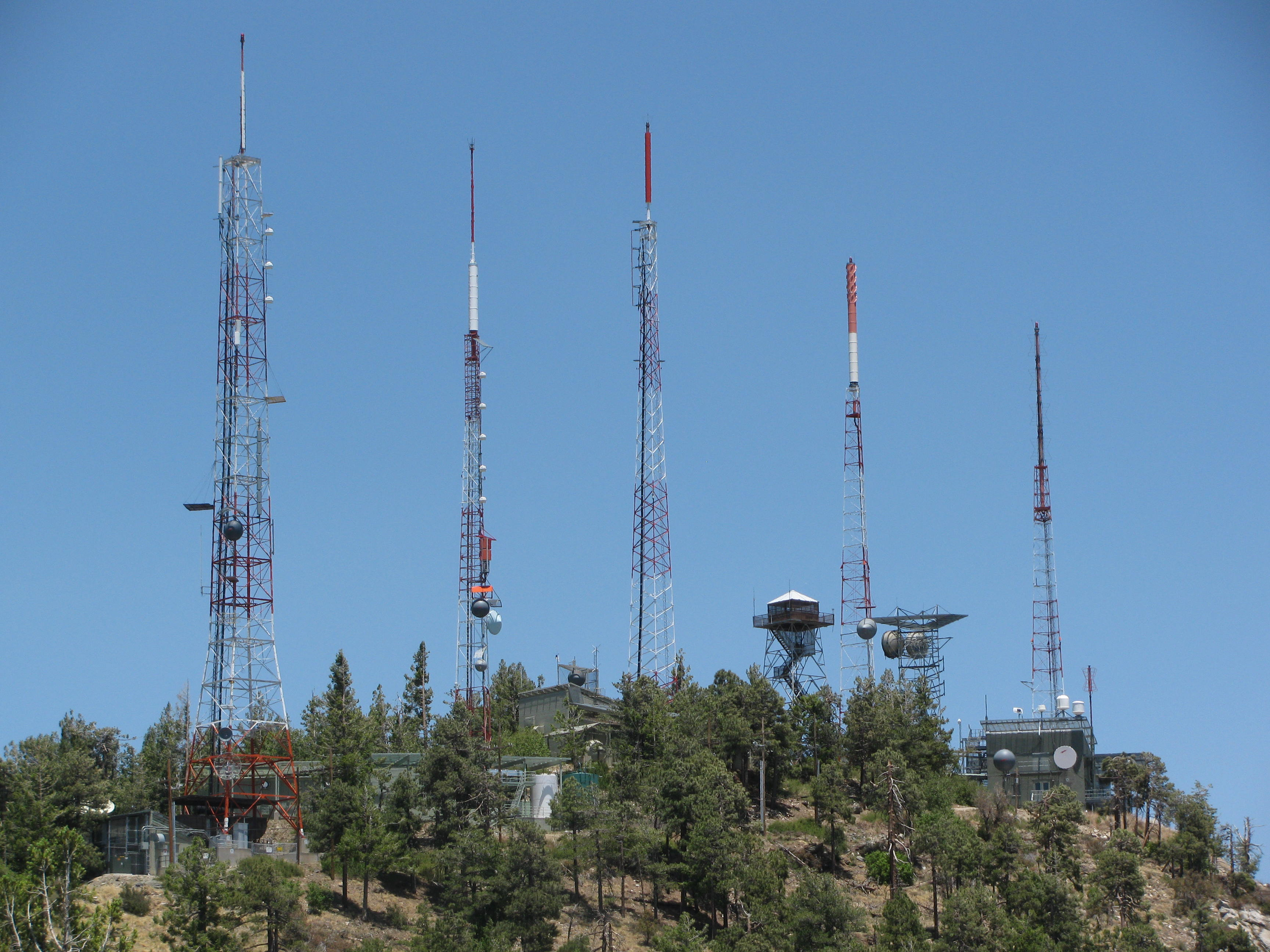
KVOA's main transmitter is on Mount Bigelow.

=== Subchannels ===
KVOA's main transmitter is on Mount Bigelow. Its signal is multiplexed:

Subchannels of KVOA
Subchannel	Res.	Short name	Programming
4.1	1080i	KVOANBC	NBC
4.2	480i	COZI	Cozi TV
4.3	480i	MYSTERY	Ion Mystery
4.4	480i	TOONS	MeTV Toons
40.3	480i	NBC LX	NBC True CRMZ (KHRR)

Broadcast on behalf of another station

=== Analog-to-digital conversion ===
In September 2003, KVOA began broadcasting a digital signal from a common facility shared with KOLD, KMSB, and KTTU-TV on Mount Bigelow. KVOA discontinued regular programming on its analog signal, over VHF channel 4, on June 12, 2009, as part of the federally mandated transition from analog to digital television, continuing to broadcast in digital on its pre-transition UHF channel 23. Simultaneously, the Casas Adobes translator converted from analog to digital on channel 4 as K04QP-D; it could not begin digital service prior to then because it reused VHF channel 4.

=== Translators ===
The Casas Adobes translator atop Tumamoc Hill in the Tucson Mountains, K04QP-D, was established as a result of the move to Mount Bigelow in 1961. As areas of the Catalina Foothills are shaded from Mount Bigelow transmitters by terrain, some 12,000 people were left unserved by the relocation of the KVOA-TV and KOLD-TV transmitters. A one-watt VHF installation on channel 11 was initially used. However, when KZAZ-TV signed on in 1967, the translator was converted to the UHF band on channel 74, later moving to channel 64 in 1985. The Casas Adobes translator converted to digital on VHF channel 4 in 2009 and moved to the UHF band on January 31, 2026.

In addition, KVOA owns a second translator in Sierra Vista, K28OY-D.
