= KUAT-FM =

Coordinates: 32.415°N 110.715°W

- Tucson, Arizona; United States
- Broadcast area: Tucson metropolitan area, Southern Arizona
- Frequency: 90.5 MHz (HD Radio)
- Branding: Classical 90.5

Programming
- Format: Classical music
- Subchannels: HD2: KUAZ simulcast

Ownership
- Owner: University of Arizona (Arizona Public Media); (Arizona Board of Regents for benefit of the University of Arizona)
- Sister stations: KUAZ (AM); KUAZ-FM; KUAT-TV

History
- First air date: May 19, 1975
- Call sign meaning: From KUAT-TV, "University of Arizona Television"

Technical information
- Licensing authority: FCC
- Facility ID: 2732
- Class: C
- ERP: 12,000 watts
- HAAT: 1,113 meters (3,652 ft)

Links
- Public license information: Public file; LMS
- Webcast: Listen live
- Website: radio.azpm.org/classical/

KUAT-FM (90.5 MHz) is a radio station in Tucson, Arizona, United States. One of two radio services operated by the University of Arizona (UA) through its Arizona Public Media arm, it broadcasts a classical format throughout Southern Arizona. Studios are in the Modern Languages Building on the UA campus on East University Boulevard.

== History ==
The UA applied at the start of 1974 to build an FM radio station that would primarily broadcast classical music; at the time, KUAT (1550 AM) primarily broadcast classical and jazz music. Federal Communications Commission (FCC) approval came at year's end, delayed by issues with a treaty between the United States and Mexico, and when KUAT-FM began on May 19, 1975, the classical and news/jazz services split.

Logo before the move of one of its 89.7 signals to 90.9

== Programming ==
The broadcast schedule consists of playlists announced by local hosts, as well as nationally syndicated broadcasts, including those from the San Francisco Symphony, the Cleveland Orchestra, the Milwaukee Symphony Orchestra, the New York Philharmonic, the Metropolitan Opera and San Francisco Opera during their seasons, the Exploring Music program with host Bill McGlaughlin, and the Radio Netherlands Live! at the Concertgebouw series. On Sundays, the NPR program From the Top, showcasing young classical musicians, is heard on KUAT, as well as Community Concerts, a program of classical music from the University of Arizona School of Music (as well as other groups performing at local venues throughout southern Arizona). KUAT is also the broadcast home of the Tucson Symphony Orchestra.

During the overnight hours, the Classical 24 service is heard.

== Translators ==
KUAT-FM has translators throughout southeastern Arizona, as well as one on Tumamoc Hill in Tucson which serves areas shaded from the main Mount Bigelow transmitter by terrain.

Broadcast translators for KUAT-FM
Call sign	Frequency	City of license	FID	ERP (W)	Class	FCC info
K208BT	89.5 FM	Safford, Arizona	3384	51	D	LMS
K215FW	90.9 FM	Sierra Vista, Arizona	2726	38	D	LMS
K209AF	89.7 FM	Tucson, Arizona	2730	250	D	LMS
K216GI	91.1 FM	Nogales, Arizona	3392	50	D	LMS
