= KMSB =

Television station in Tucson, Arizona

- Tucson, Arizona; United States
- Channels: Digital: 25 (UHF); Virtual: 11
- Branding: Fox 11

Programming
- Affiliations: 11.1: Fox; for others, see § Subchannels

Ownership
- Owner: Tegna Inc., a subsidiary of Nexstar Media Group; (Sander Operating Co. V LLC d/b/a KMSB Television)
- Operator: Gray Media
- Sister stations: KTTU-TV; KOLD-TV

History
- First air date: February 1, 1967
- Former call signs: KZAZ (1967–1985)
- Former channel numbers: Analog: 11 (VHF, 1967–2009)
- Former affiliations: Independent (1967–1986)
- Call sign meaning: former owner Mountain States Broadcasting

Technical information
- Licensing authority: FCC
- Facility ID: 44052
- ERP: 480 kW
- HAAT: 1,123 m (3,684 ft)
- Transmitter coordinates: 32°24′56″N 110°42′52″W

Links
- Public license information: Public file; LMS
- Website: kold.com

KMSB (channel 11) is a television station in Tucson, Arizona, United States, affiliated with the Fox network. It is owned by the Tegna subsidiary of Nexstar Media Group alongside CW outlet KTTU-TV (channel 18) and operated by Gray Media, owner of CBS affiliate KOLD-TV (channel 13). The three stations share studios on North Business Park Drive on the northwest side of Tucson (near the Casas Adobes neighborhood). KMSB's lone transmitter is located atop Mount Bigelow; as a result of the transmitter's location, residents in the northern part of Tucson, Oro Valley, and Marana do not receive adequate reception of the station.

The station went on the air in 1967 as KZAZ, an independent station licensed to serve Nogales, Arizona, with a coverage area including Nogales and Tucson. Under the ownership of Roadrunner Television from 1976 to 1984, it developed into a homespun station with increased popularity and programming. Roadrunner sold the station to a company controlled by The Providence Journal Company in 1985; it affiliated with Fox in 1986. After producing local news programming in its first 14 years on air, local news was revived under Belo Corporation ownership in the 2000s. The station's separate local news department was dissolved when Belo entered into a shared services agreement (SSA) with KOLD-TV in 2011, with KOLD-TV producing several dedicated newscasts. When Belo merged with the Gannett Company in 2013, the license was spun off because Gannett also owned a stake in the Arizona Daily Star newspaper. When Gannett reorganized into separate print and broadcast companies—the latter as Tegna Inc.—in 2015, it acquired the license of KMSB outright. Nexstar purchased Tegna in 2026.

== History ==
=== KZAZ ===
In 1962, channel 11 was added to the table of allocations for Nogales, Arizona. Two years later, in September 1964, the International Broadcasting Company—led by construction company official Ronald Waranch—applied to build a television station on the channel. The application brought protests from Tucson's three commercial television stations, who argued that the proposal constituted "just another Tucson TV channel, but originating in Nogales"—with negative consequences for their businesses. KVOA-TV also fretted about the loss of its translator, on channel 11, used to fill in coverage gaps on Tucson's northwest side. The transmitter would be located on Mount Hopkins, specifically at a distance from a new astronomical observatory to be built by the Smithsonian Institution, under plans approved by the United States Forest Service.

International Broadcasting Company was approved for a construction permit by the Federal Communications Commission (FCC) on April 13, 1966. In Tucson, the firm purchased a former Safeway supermarket on Tucson Blvd. to serve as its studios and offices; meanwhile, Leo and Lester Ziffren, prominent Los Angeles attorneys, and entertainer Danny Thomas joined as limited partners, as would Monty Hall and Stefan Hatos. KZAZ began broadcasting on February 1, 1967. The station aired movies in both English and Spanish, dramas, sitcoms, bull fights, cartoons, and other general entertainment fare. It had a local news department and newscast. A Nogales studio in the ballroom of the former Montezuma Hotel opened on March 19, a month and a half after starting broadcasting. The station also had an extensive amount of Spanish-language programming, which was pared back because ratings agencies were not adequately measuring Hispanic audiences—some of them in Mexico. Spanish-language programming appeared on channel 11 as late as the early 1980s with the program Telefiesta Mexicana, hosted by Óscar Stevens, who would become a minority investor in the station.

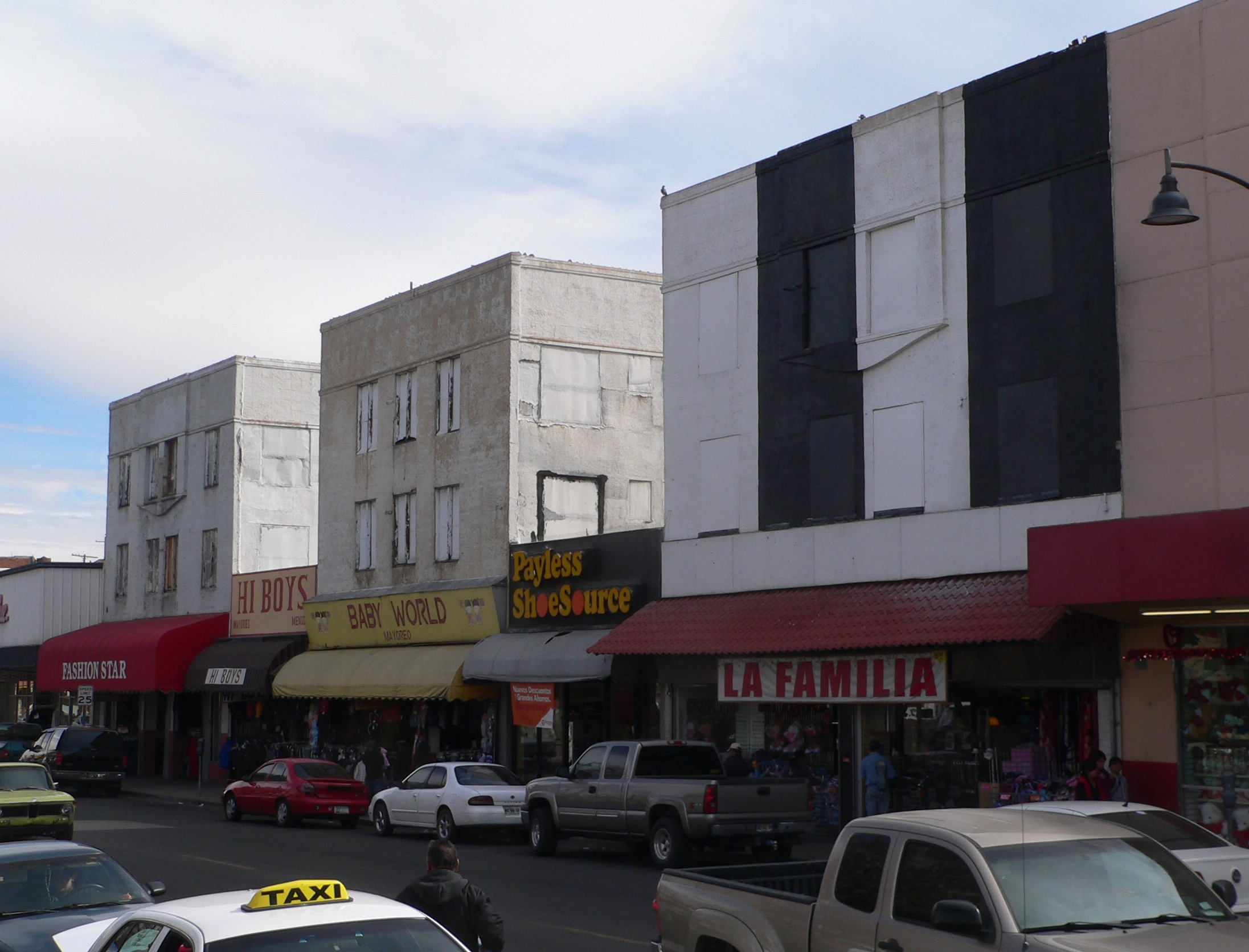
The old Montezuma Hotel served as KZAZ's first Nogales studio, though officially it also had offices in the city's Herald Building

In 1970, KZAZ filed for the station to be dual-city designated as a Tucson-Nogales station, and the FCC gave it temporary authority to operate from the Tucson studio only. This was continually extended until 1973, when permanent approval was granted. The move was also hoped to bring more advertising to the station by designating it as a Tucson outlet in advertising publications. The Nogales facility was then used as offices, though insufficient coverage of Nogales events led to the FCC issuing a short-term renewal in 1975 and ordering it to send its mobile studio to Nogales on at least a monthly basis; by 1984, the station had segments on Nogales in its midday newscasts and a weekly Sunday night program on Nogales issues. Meanwhile, the station had found its first true program success: telecasts of Arizona Wildcats men's basketball, which attracted public interest and also raised the profile of the team.

In 1970, Gene Adelstein, a former Tucson public information officer, became KZAZ's general manager. Adelstein and attorney Edward Berger put together a group of investors as Roadrunner Television and bought KZAZ in 1976. Under Adelstein, KZAZ—one of the smallest independents by market size in the country—continued to have a homespun feel. As Bonnie Henry wrote in the Arizona Daily Star: "They held live wrestling matches in the studio, organized a paint-the-station day, and ran a 24-hour Star Trek marathon that sparked a run on blank videotape." At the same time, the addition of a satellite dish, which the Christian Broadcasting Network paid for, greatly expanded its ability to air live sports and news programming, such as the Independent Network News.

The Adelstein–Berger team also expanded to a second station, owning half of KGSW-TV in Albuquerque, New Mexico, when it launched in 1981; the duo also made an unsuccessful bid for KCPQ in Tacoma, Washington, in 1978. Meanwhile, the pair began to look at possibly moving KZAZ off of Mount Hopkins. The transmitter location, south of Tucson, often meant subpar reception for Tucson viewers. KZAZ proposed relocating to Mount Bigelow, continuing to broadcast by a channel 11 translator into Nogales (with the capability to opt out of the main Tucson signal) and a new channel 24 translator into Tubac.

=== KMSB ===
Adelstein and Berger opted to put the station on the market in 1984 to allow the various investors—ranging from senator Dennis DeConcini and former Arizona Wildcats basketball coach Fred Snowden to teachers, Alaskan pipeline workers, and employees—to profit from the station. A deal was first reached in March with the Ackerley Group of Seattle for a $13.2 million purchase; Ackerley, however, found KZAZ to have overstated its advertising revenues, withdrawing from consideration by the start of June.

That September, KZAZ and KGSW-TV in Albuquerque were sold to Mountain States Broadcasting, a joint venture of the Providence Journal Company (ProJo) and Southland Corporation. KZAZ accounted for $6 million of the $13.2 million joint purchase price. Mountain States closed on the purchase in 1985 and set out to change a station that had a "home-cooked" image, with Gene Adelstein and his wife Ellen having had on-air presences. An infusion of $250,000 in new equipment and a new Nogales studio as well as new syndicated programming purchases were made, and the call sign was changed from KZAZ to KMSB-TV that September to reflect the new ownership.

In addition to becoming a charter affiliate of Fox in 1986, Mountain States followed in Adelstein's footsteps and investigated the relocation of KMSB-TV's transmitter, proposing this time a site in the Tucson Mountains and a relocated Nogales facility. After the FCC staff dismissed this proposal in 1986, the station solicited congressional support, which prompted the Roman Catholic Diocese of Tucson—builder of competing independent KDTU on channel 18—to allege undue influence because of DeConcini's involvement with the previous ownership. The FCC granted an application to make Tucson the city of license in 1990.

In September 1991, Mountain States signed a time brokerage agreement with Clear Channel Communications (now iHeartMedia), owner of KTTU-TV (the former KDTU). After 24 years, KMSB-TV moved into KTTU-TV's studios on 6th Avenue, and Mountain States began programming and selling all advertising time across both stations and providing other services to Clear Channel.

The Belo Corporation purchased the Providence Journal Corporation in 1997. Belo then purchased KTTU-TV outright from Clear Channel in 2002. The stations' operations were becoming more technically entangled with Belo's KTVK in Phoenix: by 2004, almost all of the 30 employees working at the KMSB-KTTU studio were in advertising sales, with programming functions and master control having been moved to Phoenix. In many ways, KMSB emerged an outlier in Belo's portfolio. It was the company's only Fox affiliate, and it never developed an intensive news presence. It took seven years from the time KMSB started a local newscast in 2003, in an arrangement using KVOA reporters and KTVK news anchors, to 2010 for the newsroom to stand alone. Peter Diaz, the president of media operations at Belo, admitted that when the shooting of Gabrielle Giffords occurred in January 2011, "there was no way we could compete with the resources we had in Tucson".

=== Shared services era ===
In November 2011, Belo announced that it would enter into a shared services agreement with Raycom Media beginning in February 2012, citing a lack of advertising revenue and the weakly recovering Arizona economy. This outsourcing arrangement resulted in CBS affiliate KOLD-TV taking over daily operations of KMSB and KTTU and moving their advertising sales department into the KOLD studios (however, they remained employees of Belo). All remaining positions at the two stations were eliminated and master control moved from KTVK to KOLD. The transfer of KMSB's operations occurred in several stages, with newscasts moving to KOLD's studios on February 1 and other operations being taken over by KOLD in the following weeks.

Logo from 2015 to 2024

On June 13, 2013, the Gannett Company announced that it would acquire Belo. However, as Gannett held a partial ownership stake in the publisher of the Arizona Daily Star, the KMSB license was instead sold to Sander Media, LLC, operated by a former Belo executive, Jack Sander. While the other Belo stations acquired by Sander in the deal had various shared services agreements with Gannett, Raycom Media continued to operate the two stations, and the Belo employees handling advertising sales became Gannett employees. The sale was completed on December 23. On June 29, 2015, Gannett's publishing operations were spun off, with the remainder renamed Tegna; after the spin-out, Sander filed to transfer the licenses of its stations back to Tegna in a deal completed on December 3. KTTU was sold to Ben Tucker, former president and CEO of Fisher Communications. Tegna continued to sell its advertising time via a joint sales agreement. Tegna acquired the station in 2019 for a net payment to Tucker of $171,000.

Nexstar Media Group acquired Tegna in a deal announced in August 2025 and completed in March 2026.

== Newscasts ==
Unusually for a station of its size, KZAZ started with local news and continued producing full-length local newscasts for nearly 15 years with anchors such as George Borozan and John Scott Ulm, who later served as a state senator while still working for the station. The midday and 9:30 p.m. editions of Newsroom, however, attracted few viewers near the end of its run; despite local news coverage described as "thorough", KZAZ's local news was prone to gaffes that dented its credibility. At a Tucson Press Club roast one year, it was quipped, "They named it Channel 11 after the number of viewers who watch their news." The newscasts were dropped in 1981 and replaced with short updates throughout the day with a reduced staff. News updates were dropped with the changeover to KMSB in 1985.

It would be another 18 years before local news returned. On June 16, 2003, the hour-long Fox 11 News at Nine began to air as part of a three-way partnership. The newsgathering operation was supplied by Tucson NBC affiliate KVOA, while the news itself was presented by anchors at KTVK. The program was cut to 30 minutes in 2004.

Over the next several years, more and more of KMSB's news output was presented from Tucson. In 2005, a local sports department began to anchor Friday and Saturday night sports segments in the newscasts and a Sunday night sports show, Fox 11 Sports Force. In August 2008, KMSB began originating its own newscasts, which in turn expanded back to an hour in January 2009. In April 2010, the entire newsroom became a standalone operation when the news staff migrated; KVOA opted to discontinue the arrangement.

In 2010, KMSB began to plan for the introduction of a four-hour morning newscast that fall, to be called Daybreak. However, Belo corporate held the project back due to budgetary concerns, and the station continued to air Good Morning Arizona from KTVK.

On February 1, 2012, KOLD-TV took over the operations of KMSB—taking over production responsibilities of KMSB's nightly prime time newscast at 9, as well as launching a two-hour weekday morning show (from 7 until 9), Fox 11 Daybreak, on the station. In addition, KMSB dropped its simulcast of KTVK's Good Morning Arizona, and Fox 11 Sports Force was canceled (with the Sunday 9 p.m. newscast now airing for an hour). The same day, KMSB and KOLD introduced a shared website under the Tucson News Now banner. By 2020, when a new version of the shared services agreement came into effect, a third local newscast from the KOLD-TV newsroom at 5:30 p.m. on weekdays had been added.

In 2020, KMSB began simulcasting several daily newscasts from Tegna's KPNX in Phoenix in addition to the Tucson newscasts from KOLD-TV, later paring back to air just the Phoenix station's 10 p.m. newscast.

== Technical information ==
=== Subchannels ===
KMSB's transmitter is located atop Mount Bigelow. The station's signal is multiplexed:

Subchannels of KMSB-TV
Subchannel	Res.	Short name	Programming
11.1	720p	KMSB-HD	Fox
11.2	480i	Quest	Quest
11.3	480i	Crime	True Crime Network
11.4	480i	NOSEY	Nosey
11.5	480i	ShopLC	Shop LC
11.7	480i	Comet	Comet
11.8	480i	QVC	QVC

=== Analog-to-digital conversion ===
The digital transmission facility, shared with other Tucson stations, was built on Mount Bigelow in 2003. KMSB ended regular programming on its analog signal, over VHF channel 11, on June 12, 2009, as part of the federally mandated transition from analog to digital television. The station's digital signal remained on its pre-transition UHF channel 25, using virtual channel 11.

As part of the SAFER Act, KMSB kept its analog signal on the air for two weeks to inform viewers of the digital television transition through a loop of public service announcements from the National Association of Broadcasters.
