= KOLD-TV =

Television station in Tucson, Arizona

- Tucson, Arizona; United States
- Channels: Digital: 32 (UHF); Virtual: 13
- Branding: 13 News

Programming
- Affiliations: 13.1: CBS; for others, see § Subchannels

Ownership
- Owner: Gray Media; (Gray Television Licensee, LLC)
- Sister stations: KMSB; KTTU-TV

History
- First air date: February 1, 1953
- Former call signs: KOPO-TV (1953–1957)
- Former channel numbers: Analog: 13 (VHF, 1953–2009)
- Former affiliations: DuMont (secondary, 1953–1956)
- Call sign meaning: "Cold", derived from then-co-owned KOOL-TV in Phoenix

Technical information
- Licensing authority: FCC
- Facility ID: 48663
- ERP: 108 kW
- HAAT: 1,123 m (3,684 ft)
- Transmitter coordinates: 32°24′56″N 110°42′52″W
- Translator(s): 13 (VHF) Tucson

Links
- Public license information: Public file; LMS
- Website: www.kold.com

KOLD-TV (channel 13) is a television station in Tucson, Arizona, United States, affiliated with CBS. It is owned by Gray Media and operated alongside Fox affiliate KMSB (channel 11) and CW outlet KTTU-TV (channel 18), which are owned by the Tegna subsidiary of Nexstar Media Group. The three stations share studios on North Business Park Drive on the northwest side of Tucson (near Casas Adobes). KOLD-TV's primary transmitter is atop Mount Bigelow, with a secondary transmitter atop the Tucson Mountains west of the city to fill in gaps in coverage.

Established in February 1953, KOLD-TV is the second-oldest television station in the state and was the first on air in Tucson. It has been affiliated with CBS for its entire history. After initially being the market leader in local news, it was surpassed by KVOA in the 1970s and suffered particularly in the late 1980s and 1990s from corporate neglect and cost-cutting. The station produces local newscasts that, since the 2000s, have been competitive in the local ratings.

== History ==
=== Construction and Autry-Chauncey ownership ===
In the wake of the Federal Communications Commission (FCC) lifting its freeze on the award of new television stations, three Tucson radio stations applied for three channels. The Old Pueblo Broadcasting Company, held by Gene Autry and Tom Chauncey and owner of Tucson's KOPO (1450 AM), filed for channel 13 without opposition on June 21, 1952, and was granted a construction permit to build on November 12. Construction got under way in early December on an interim transmitter facility mounted on the AM radio tower, as 500-foot (150 m) towers were not yet available, and on a television addition to the KOPO radio facility on West Drachman Street.

On January 13, 1953, at 1:13:13 p.m. (13:13:13 in 24-hour time), the KOPO-TV transmitter was turned on. As construction in the television studio was still in progress, no programming was aired until February 1, when the station began to carry programs from CBS and the DuMont Television Network. The day before, a dedicatory program was broadcast from the studios. Network presentations had to be aired from kinescopes until a coaxial cable hookup was completed in September to be shared by KOPO-TV and new station KVOA-TV, allowing Tucsonans to see live network shows.

KOPO radio and television became KOLD radio and television on April 30, 1957. The KOLD call letters had been used by the Autry-owned station in Yuma until it was sold; that outlet became KOFA and closed in 1963. Autry and Chauncey owned KOOL radio and television in Phoenix; as was done there, the phones were answered "It's KOLD in Tucson". The main transmitter was moved to Mount Bigelow in 1961, simultaneously with KVOA-TV; KGUN-TV had been built on the mountain five years prior.

=== Evening News, Knight-Ridder, and News-Press and Gazette ownership ===
In December 1968, Autry and Chauncey announced the sale of KOLD-TV, separate from the radio station, for $3.8 million to the Universal Communications Corporation, the broadcasting arm of the Detroit-based Evening News Association. The FCC approved the deal in 1969, though it required the E. W. Scripps Trust to divest itself of its holding in the Evening News Association, as Scripps-Howard Broadcasting owned four VHF stations (of a limit of five), and Evening News now would own two (KOLD-TV and WWJ-TV in Detroit). The commission tweaked the ruling to allow Scripps to retain an interest of one percent. The radio station, split from channel 13, reverted to its former KOPO designation.

The Gannett Company purchased the Evening News Association on September 5, 1985, for $717 million, thwarting a $566 million hostile takeover bid by L.P. Media Inc., owned by television producer Norman Lear and media executive A. Jerrold Perenchio. The merged company could not retain channel 13. Gannett already owned the Tucson Citizen newspaper, and channel 13's signal slightly overlapped with Gannett-owned KPNX in Phoenix. Gannett subsequently divested KOLD-TV—along with KTVY in Oklahoma City and WALA-TV in Mobile, Alabama—to Knight-Ridder Broadcasting for $160 million.

In October 1988, Knight-Ridder announced its intent to sell the company's station group to help reduce a $929 million debt load and finance a $353 million acquisition of online information provider Dialog Information Services. The News-Press & Gazette Company (NPG) acquired KOLD on June 26, 1989, spending $18 million. It implemented budget cuts in the newsroom, which was wracked by employee turnover as a result. NPG also moved KOLD from Mount Bigelow to the Tucson Mountains west of the city; this improved reception in some parts of the city that had terrain blockages, but it created signal ingress issues for cable subscribers. More critically, it impaired the signal for many over-the-air viewers, notably in outlying areas such as Benson, Arizona. A 1985 study done for KVOA, KGUN, and KOLD estimated a Tucson Mountains move would affect 15 percent of the station's viewers.

=== Turnaround ===
In 1993, New Vision Television, a new broadcast station group based in Lansing, Michigan, bought NPG's entire television station group of the time, which included KOLD and stations in five other markets. New Vision took over before the end of the year and immediately made moves to shore up flagging employee morale at KOLD. In addition to a new general manager, New Vision began planning for a new facility on Tucson's northwest side with nearly twice as much space as the Drachman facility, which the station had outgrown. The new facility, outfitted with a news studio called the "Newsplex", debuted in late 1994, before New Vision sold its stations to Ellis Communications in 1995; Ellis was in turn folded into Raycom Media in 1997. Raycom would house its centralized design operation, Raycom Design Group, in Tucson.

=== Shared services agreement with KMSB and KTTU ===
On November 15, 2011, the Belo Corporation, then-owner of local Fox affiliate KMSB and MyNetworkTV affiliate KTTU, announced that it would enter into a shared services agreement (SSA) with Raycom Media beginning in February 2012, resulting in KOLD taking over the two stations' operations and moving their advertising sales department to the KOLD studios. All remaining positions at KMSB and KTTU, including news, engineering and production, were eliminated, and master control operations moved from Belo's KTVK in Phoenix to KOLD. Though FCC rules disallowed common ownership of more than two stations in the same market, combined SSA/duopoly operations were permissible.

=== Sale to Gray Television ===
In 2018, Raycom Media was acquired by Gray Television. The $3.6 billion transaction gave Gray its first station in Arizona. The arrangements with KMSB and KTTU remained unchanged. The sale was approved on December 20 of that year and was completed on January 2, 2019.

== News operation ==
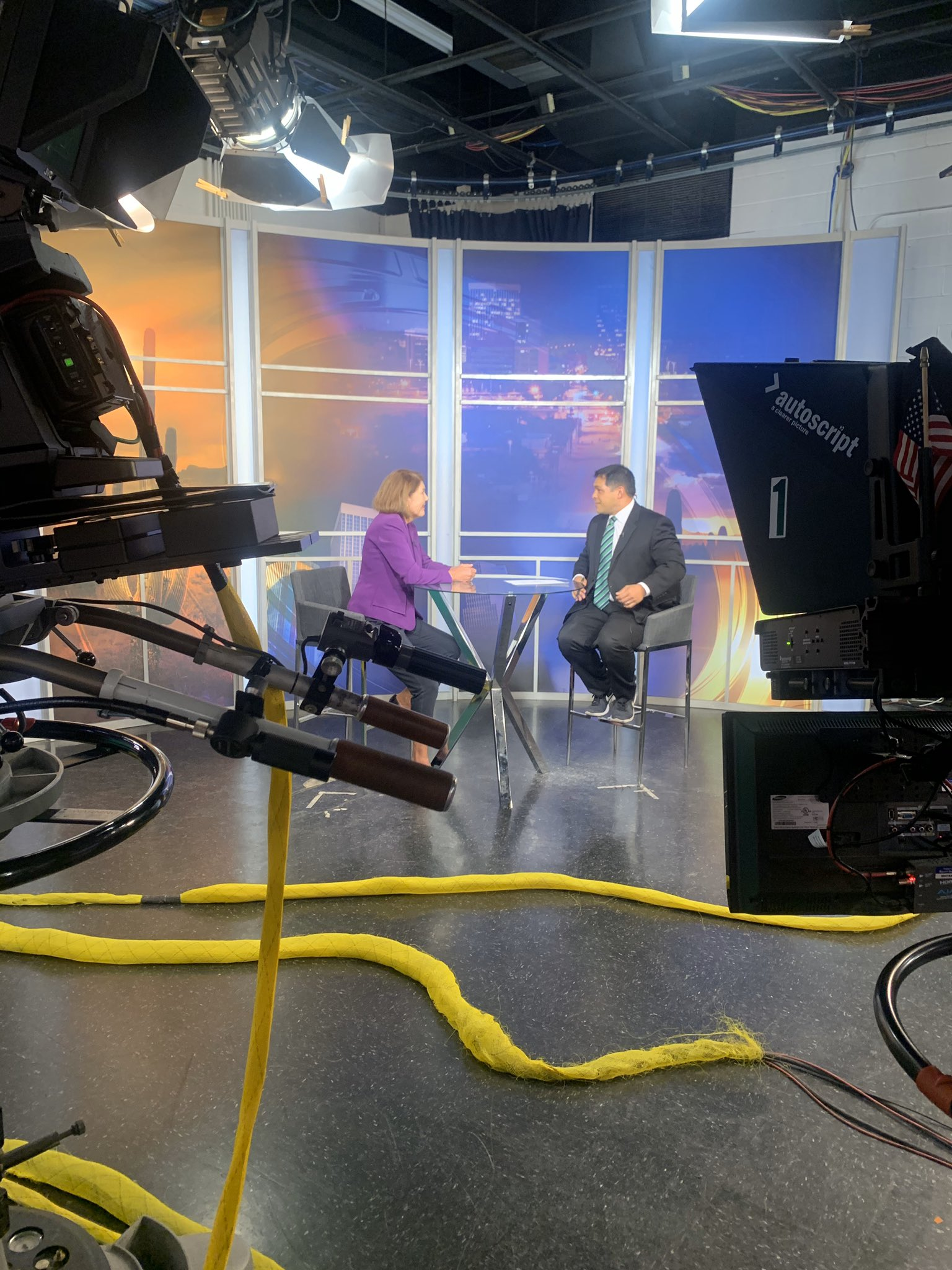
Behind-the-scenes at KOLD-TV with Ann Kirkpatrick as a guest.

Originally, local news programming for KOPO-TV/KOLD-TV was provided by KOOL-TV in Phoenix. However, by the 1960s, the station was leading the news ratings in the Tucson market, a status it would hold until the late 1970s, when KVOA took the lead. The station continued in second or third place for the next quarter-century, with the station reaching a nadir after being acquired by News-Press & Gazette. Budget cuts meant outdated equipment that broke down, while a series of anchors were fired and replaced with cheaper, entry-level talent. Vic Caputo, who had spent seven years at channel 13, was released by his contract in a decision he attributed to the owners' "money crunch". NPG fired sports anchor Kevin McCabe days before Christmas in a dispute that led to a lawsuit over severance pay. Weatherman Pat Evans was told that there was a "big plan" for him, but when he asked, they would not reveal it; he declined to sign a new contract and took a new job in Sacramento, California.

In the late 1990s, KOLD-TV became Tucson's first station to operate a news helicopter. Despite these improvements, newscast ratings continued to languish far behind the other two major stations, with channel 13 drawing half as many news viewers, into the 2000s. In 2001, the station won a Alfred I. duPont–Columbia University Award, given to Chip Yost for a story about exploding fuel tanks in police cars. By 2004, KOLD had pulled ahead of KVOA in all evening timeslots in the 25–54 demo, a feat which had not occurred in Tucson in 25 years. During this time, KOLD-TV also produced a 9 p.m. local newscast for KWBA-TV. Not all were happy: anchor Randy Garsee was fired in 2006 after sending an email to all employees criticizing the news director for "micromanaging".

As part of taking over KMSB's operations, KOLD-TV took over production of its local 9 p.m. newscast and added a weekday morning newscast, with the existing KMSB news team laid off. KMSB and KOLD also introduced a shared website, originally branded Tucson News Now.

In 2022, Gray introduced new 9 a.m. and 3 p.m. newscasts for KOLD.

== Technical information ==
=== Subchannels ===
The station's signal is multiplexed:

Subchannels of KOLD-TV
Subchannel	Res.	Short name	Programming
13.1	1080i	KOLD DT	CBS
13.2	480i	Me TV	MeTV
13.3	720p	AZSPORT	Arizona's Family Sports (KPHE-LD)
13.4	480i	IONPlus	Ion Plus
13.5	480i	Outlaw	Outlaw
13.6	480i	Charge	Charge!
40.4	480i	Oxygen	Oxygen (KHRR)

Simulcast of subchannels of another station
Broadcast on behalf of another station

=== Analog-to-digital transition ===
KOLD-TV ended regular programming on its analog signal, over VHF channel 13, on June 12, 2009, as part of the federally mandated transition from analog to digital television. The station's digital signal remained on its pre-transition UHF channel 32, using virtual channel 13.

While KOLD's analog signal originated from a transmitter site in the Tucson Mountains west of downtown, KOLD's primary digital transmitter is at the Mount Bigelow transmitter site to the northeast of the city, where the major Tucson stations built a common digital transmission facility in 2003. The Tucson Mountains site was then converted to a digital replacement translator on channel 13 to provide service to the Catalina Foothills.
