= KSAZ (AM) =

Spanish-language religious radio station in Marana, Arizona

Coordinates: 32°27′11″N 111°17′4″W

- Marana, Arizona; United States
- Broadcast area: Tucson metropolitan area
- Frequency: 580 kHz
- Branding: La Estación de la Familia

Programming
- Language: Spanish
- Format: Christian talk and music

Ownership
- Owner: KASA Radio Hogar, Inc.

History
- First air date: 1987
- Former call signs: KJMM (1987–1990)

Technical information
- Licensing authority: FCC
- Facility ID: 51079
- Class: B
- Power: 5,000 watts (day); 390 watts (night)

Links
- Public license information: Public file; LMS
- Website: laestaciondelafamilia.org

KSAZ (580 kHz) is a commercial AM radio station licensed to Marana, Arizona, and broadcasting to the Tucson metropolitan area. It is owned by KASA Radio Hogar, Inc. KSAZ airs a Spanish-language Christian talk and music format. Most of the day, it carries brokered programming, where hosts buy time on the air and may use their programs to seek donations to their ministries.

By day, KSAZ is powered at 5,000 watts non-directional. At night, to protect other stations on 580 AM, it reduces power to 390 watts and switches to a directional antenna with a three-tower array.

== History ==
KJMM signed on in 1987. It was owned by Elliott-Phelps Broadcasting Corporation and used the facilities of the former KIKX, a noted Top 40 station on 580 AM in Tucson, Arizona. KIKX signed off the air five years earlier after its license was revoked. In 1990, KJMM became KSAZ and relocated to Marana.

Prior to March 1, 2009, it was airing a country music format courtesy of ABC Radio's Real Country satellite feed. Prior to September 1, 2008, it was airing an adult standards format.
