= KWBA-TV =

Television station in Sierra Vista, Arizona

- Sierra Vista–Tucson, Arizona; United States
- City: Sierra Vista, Arizona
- Channels: Digital: 21 (UHF); Virtual: 58
- Branding: The Spot – Arizona 58

Programming
- Affiliations: 58.1: Independent; 9.1: ABC; for others, see § Subchannels

Ownership
- Owner: E. W. Scripps Company; (Scripps Broadcasting Holdings LLC)
- Sister stations: KGUN-TV

History
- First air date: December 31, 1998
- Former channel numbers: Analog: 58 (UHF, 1998–2009); Digital: 44 (UHF, until 2018)
- Former affiliations: The WB (1998–2006); The CW (2006–2024)
- Call sign meaning: "The WB Arizona", after prior affiliation

Technical information
- Licensing authority: FCC
- Facility ID: 35095
- ERP: 525 kW
- HAAT: 332.3 m (1,090 ft)
- Transmitter coordinates: 31°45′31.8″N 110°48′5.5″W

Links
- Public license information: Public file; LMS
- Website: www.thespottv.com/arizona-58

KWBA-TV (channel 58), branded as The Spot – Arizona 58, is an independent television station licensed to Sierra Vista, Arizona, United States, serving the Tucson area. It is owned by the E. W. Scripps Company alongside ABC affiliate KGUN-TV (channel 9). The two stations share studios on East Rosewood Street in East Tucson; KWBA-TV's transmitter is located atop the Santa Rita Mountains southeast of the city.

== History ==
The first attempt at putting a station on channel 58 in Sierra Vista was KCCA-TV (call sign standing for Cochise County, Arizona). KCCA was owned by Sierra Vista Television, owned by Thomas Gramatikas. The proposed station would have broadcast from a tower in the Sierra Vista area with a power of 2.38 million watts; however, the Tucson area would have been blocked by terrain from seeing it. It may have desired to operate as a subscription television station, indicated by a 1982 filing where the FCC granted KCCA permission to install subscription television equipment. By 1985, the permittee was Manning Telecasting, who also held the construction permit for channel 11 in Yuma, but the permit vanished the next year, and KCCA never made it to air.

The history of the current channel 58 began November 22, 1996, with a construction permit granted to KM Communications to serve Sierra Vista and Tucson on analog channel 58. The call letters were originally KAUC, but in August 1997, the station changed their call letters to KWBA to reflect their affiliation deal with The WB; the former superstation feed of Chicago's WGN-TV served as Tucson's de facto affiliate of The WB until KWBA signed on. In 1997, the station announced its existence and that it was close to securing Tucson office space. The station had now changed ownership, being held by a partnership of two companies: Sierra Television (a KM subsidiary) and Tucson Communications. Its general manager was Ron Bergamo, an alumnus of the University of Arizona returning to Tucson after a six-year stint as general manager of KTSP-TV/KSAZ-TV in Phoenix.

Delays in permitting for the tower site on U.S. Forest Service land held up construction more than anticipated, but KWBA-TV began broadcasting on December 31, 1998. WB programming was supplemented by short local features, syndicated programs, and Arizona Diamondbacks baseball. It proved a success: in 2001, it tied for the highest rating among all WB affiliates in non-metered television markets (those still measured by diaries). That year, Tucson Communications changed its name to Cascade Broadcasting Group, having become the sole owner. In 2006, KWBA-TV affiliated with The CW upon the merger of The WB with UPN.

On March 18, 2008, Journal Broadcast Group announced it would purchase KWBA-TV, creating a duopoly with KGUN-TV. To make the $11.9 million purchase, Journal had to apply for a failing station waiver; even though Tucson had too few commercial station owners to normally permit another duopoly, it presented financial statements showing it had lost money for three years straight (with operating losses nearing $900,000 a year in 2006 and 2007), a situation exacerbated by the loss of Diamondbacks baseball rights (the team moved all games to Fox Sports Arizona after the 2007 season), and pledged to start a local newscast from KGUN-TV for air on KWBA-TV. The FCC permitted the acquisition in June. Work was carried out that fall to move KWBA-TV into KGUN-TV's studios.

On July 30, 2014, it was announced that the E. W. Scripps Company would acquire Journal Communications in an all-stock transaction. The combined firm would retain its broadcast properties, including KGUN, and spin off the print assets as Journal Media Group. The FCC approved the deal on December 12, 2014, and shareholders followed suit on March 11, 2015; the merger was completed on April 1.

On April 19, 2024, CW majority owner Nexstar Media Group announced that the network would not renew its affiliations with Scripps-owned stations, including KWBA-TV. On July 31, Tegna announced that it had reached a deal with the network in which it will affiliate with MyNetworkTV station KTTU-TV (channel 18).

KWBA-TV rebranded to Arizona 58 on September 1, 2024. As part of the rebrand, the station would air select Vegas Golden Knights and Utah Mammoth games through Scripps Sports and acquire the syndication rights to GMFB: Overtime.

== Programming ==
=== Newscasts ===
In 2003, KWBA entered into an agreement with local CBS affiliate KOLD-TV (channel 13) and launched a 9 p.m. newscast in April of that year; Fox affiliate KMSB-TV soon followed with their own 9 p.m. newscast. Within a year, KMSB's offering edged out KWBA's in the ratings. The KOLD-produced newscast was short-lived, as it went off the air on December 15, 2005, after the contract with KOLD-TV expired and the two parties could not agree on a new direction for the newscast.

In September 2008, KGUN began rebroadcasting its 6 p.m. newscast on KWBA at 9 p.m. KGUN began producing a live weeknight-only 9 p.m. newscast for KWBA-TV on March 9, 2009.

In April 2014, KGUN began airing a one-hour extension of its weekday morning newscast on KWBA from 7 to 8 a.m., titled Good Morning Tucson Extra.

== Technical information ==
=== Subchannels ===
The station's digital signal is multiplexed:

Subchannels of KWBA-TV
Subchannel	Res.	Short name	Programming
58.1	1080i	KWBA-HD	Main KWBA-TV programming
58.2	480i	CourtTV	Court TV
58.4	480i	Grit	Grit
58.5	480i	DEFY	Ion Plus
58.6	480i	Get TV	Game Show Central
9.1	720p	KGUN-HD	ABC (KGUN-TV)

Simulcast of subchannels of another station

=== Analog-to-digital conversion ===
KWBA-TV ended regular programming on its analog signal, over UHF channel 58, on June 12, 2009, as part of the federally mandated transition from analog to digital television; the digital signal continued on UHF channel 44, using virtual channel 58. The station was then moved to channel 21 in the repack.
