= KGUN-TV =

Television station in Tucson, Arizona

- Tucson, Arizona; United States
- Channels: Digital: 9 (VHF); Virtual: 9
- Branding: KGUN 9

Programming
- Affiliations: 9.1: ABC; for others, see § Subchannels

Ownership
- Owner: E. W. Scripps Company; (Scripps Broadcasting Holdings LLC)
- Sister stations: KWBA-TV

History
- First air date: June 3, 1956
- Former call signs: KDWI-TV (1956–1957); KGUN-TV (1957–1987); KGUN (1987–2009)
- Former channel numbers: Analog: 9 (VHF, 1956–2009); Digital: 35 (UHF, 2005–2009)
- Former affiliations: Independent (1956–1957)
- Call sign meaning: Former owner's interest in gun collecting and the Westerns that were filmed in Tucson

Technical information
- Licensing authority: FCC
- Facility ID: 36918
- ERP: 36.5 kW
- HAAT: 1,140 m (3,740 ft)
- Transmitter coordinates: 32°24′55.6″N 110°42′53.1″W
- Translator(s): K27OP-D Oro Valley–Tucson; KWBA-TV 9.1 (21 UHF) Sierra Vista

Links
- Public license information: Public file; LMS
- Website: www.kgun9.com

KGUN-TV (channel 9) is a television station in Tucson, Arizona, United States, affiliated with ABC. It is owned by the E. W. Scripps Company alongside Sierra Vista–licensed independent station KWBA-TV (channel 58). The two stations share studios on East Rosewood Street in east Tucson; KGUN-TV's transmitter is located atop Mount Bigelow, northeast of the city.

KGUN-TV went on the air as KDWI-TV, Tucson's third commercial station, in 1956. Within a year, it was sold by its founding owner and took its present call sign and ABC affiliation. The station has generally run second or third in local news throughout its history.

== History ==
=== Channel 9 prior to KGUN ===
The construction permit that was built as KDWI-TV was not the first the Federal Communications Commission (FCC) had awarded for channel 9 in Tucson. Radio station KCNA (580 AM) received a construction permit in December 1952 to set up a station; when it relocated its transmitter facility in 1951, it installed a television "saddle" to support a future antenna on one of its towers. As late as April 1953, KCNA reported it was buying television equipment with an aim to sign on in December. However, the proposed station was scuttled by ownership turnover within KCNA. When the firm abandoned its plans to build the station in late August, it cited concerns that Tucson would not be a viable market for three commercial TV stations—KOPO-TV and KVOA having been constructed in the intervening months—and that it could not offer "minimum worthwhile public service to the viewers".

=== Construction and early years ===
D. W. "Doc" Ingram, a Tucson lumber dealer, and his wife Kathleen, trading as the Tucson Television Company, applied for channel 9 on March 31, 1955, and received a permit just 20 days later on April 19. By February 1956, construction had been finished on an antenna atop Mount Bigelow, which made it the first Tucson station sited on a mountaintop; the other two commercial stations would relocate to Mount Bigelow in 1961. KDWI-TV began telecasting June 3, 1956, from studios on North 6th Avenue; it originally lacked network affiliation, subsisting entirely on movies. The studios were outfitted with a car lift, which Ingram had installed to allow the building to be used as a garage should the television venture fail.

In November, Ingram sold KDWI-TV to the Tucson Television Company, an unrelated concern led by Hugh U. Garrett, an oilman from Longview, Texas, and two other East Texas men; the $533,000 sale was accompanied by a 15-year lease of the studios. The call letters were changed to KGUN-TV on March 14, when the station joined ABC, bringing the full network lineup to southern Arizona for the first time. (Note: Varying reasons have been cited for the change in call sign: A history page on KGUN's website in 2001 quotes then-general manager Tolbert Foster as having said, "Where I come from, DWI don't mean nothin' good" (referring to driving while intoxicated).; A 2006 article published for the station's 50th anniversary notes the appropriateness of the name for the new Texan owners. A 2013 story mentions that Garrett was a gun collector.; A 1986 article notes "Tucson viewers' love of western movies".) With the change from an all-film lineup, local programming was added; the children's show "Marshal KGUN" debuted at that time and ran until 1968. Other remembered programs from this period in station history include the local Romper Room franchise as well as Mexican Theater, which aired Mexican television fare, and the Chiller Saturday night horror movie (hosted by KGUN program director Jack Jacobson). For more than 30 years, KGUN covered the Fiesta de los Vaqueros rodeo parade, the world's longest non-mechanized parade; it dropped coverage after the 2004 edition because it lost money despite good ratings.

Garrett sold the station in 1961 to a group headed by Cincinnati meatpacker Henry S. Hilberg and Edwin G. Richter of Evansville, Indiana, who owned WEHT in that city. Hilberg and Richter sold both stations to Gilmore Broadcasting in 1964; Richter stayed on as manager of KGUN-TV. Gilmore then sold KGUN-TV to May Broadcasting for $2.9 million in 1968.

=== Lee, Emmis, Journal, and Scripps ownership ===
May would sell KGUN and KMTV in Omaha, Nebraska, along with two Omaha radio properties, to Lee Enterprises in December 1986. Two years later, Lee began construction of a $4 million studio complex in the Gateway Center complex on Tucson's east side. Lee in turn sold all of its stations to Emmis Communications in 2000. Emmis was credited with a focus on capital expenditures, which had been less of a priority for Lee Enterprises in its later years.

In 2005, Emmis began the liquidation of its television properties, selling KGUN to the Milwaukee-based Journal Broadcast Group, which already owned four radio stations in Tucson; the transfer was part of a $235 million transaction which included KMTV and WFTX-TV in Fort Myers, Florida.

On March 18, 2008, Journal announced plans to buy CW affiliate KWBA-TV from Cascade Broadcasting Group on undisclosed terms, creating a duopoly with KGUN-TV. To make the purchase, Journal had to apply for a failing station waiver; even though Tucson had too few commercial station owners to normally permit another duopoly, it presented financial statements showing it had lost money for three years straight, a situation exacerbated by the loss of Arizona Diamondbacks baseball rights, and pledged to start a local newscast from KGUN-TV for air on KWBA-TV. The FCC permitted the acquisition in June.

On July 30, 2014, it was announced that the E. W. Scripps Company would acquire Journal Communications in an all-stock transaction. The combined firm would retain its broadcast properties, including KGUN, and spin off the print assets as Journal Media Group. The deal made KGUN a sister station to Phoenix's ABC affiliate, KNXV-TV. The FCC approved the deal on December 12, 2014, and shareholders followed suit on March 11, 2015; the merger was completed on April 1. Scripps then sold off its radio properties in 2018, including the Tucson stations, which were purchased by Lotus Communications.

On October 5, 2023, the Arizona Coyotes announced their departure from the troubled regional sports network Bally Sports Arizona as during its parent company's bankruptcy, the network rejected the Coyotes' contract. That same day, the team and Scripps Sports announced a new contract. As part of the deal, games would be broadcast by KGUN-TV in Tucson. Because of network programming commitments, most games would air on KGUN's second subchannel, which usually carries Laff, though the station would carry surrounding Coyotes team content on its main channel. The games would also air on a subchannel of KNXV in the Phoenix market and outside of Arizona via the league's out-of-market sports package deal with ESPN+.

== Local programming ==
=== News operation ===
While the station had aired some form of local news even as KDWI-TV, it was not until the 1960s that the newsroom began to grow in importance and then in size. Mac Marshall served as the driving force for the news department for most of the decade, leaving in December 1968. The decade also brought KGUN's first full-time news reporter, Pat Stevens, who rose from presenting the weather to becoming one of just a handful of female news directors in the United States after being promoted in 1972. The station's reporting on an investigation into a sheriff's deputy resulted in threats being made to KGUN and Stevens; after five years, she was hired as a producer at KABC-TV in Los Angeles. However, the station languished in third place, often remaining a "giant step" behind KOLD and KVOA. Historically, KVOA (from 1980 to the mid-2000s) and KOLD (prior to then and since) have led the news ratings in Tucson. However, KGUN became more competitive in the 1990s and 2000s, most notably under Forrest Carr, a news director who instituted a "Viewer's Bill of Rights" and also established an ombudsman position, making KGUN one of just two U.S. TV stations to have one.

KGUN was the first local station to air a morning newscast, doing so in 1987. On April 21, 2014, KGUN began airing a one-hour extension of its weekday morning newscast on KWBA from 7 to 8 a.m. titled Good Morning Tucson Extra.

=== Non-news programming ===
On April 26, 2010, KGUN began producing a lifestyle and entertainment magazine program, The Morning Blend, airing at 11:30 a.m. on weekdays. Journal was already producing similar programs with the same name at its Milwaukee and Fort Myers stations.

==== Notable former on-air staff ====
- Ashley Brewer – weekend sports anchor
- Daniel Corbett – weather forecaster
- David Gregory – intern and reporter
- Stella Inger – news anchor
- Maggie Vespa – general assignment reporter

== Technical information ==
=== Subchannels ===
KGUN-TV's transmitter is located atop Mount Bigelow, northeast of Tucson. The station's signal is multiplexed:

Subchannels of KGUN-TV
Subchannel	Res.	Short name	Programming
9.1	720p	KGUN HD	ABC
9.2	720p	Laff	Laff
9.3	480i	Antenna	Antenna TV → TBA (soon)/Scripps Sports
9.4	480i	Bounce	Bounce TV
9.5	720p	ION	Ion
9.6	480i	BUSTED	Busted

The main channel is also simulcast from the KWBA-TV transmitter as an aid to reception in parts of the market, particularly to the south of Tucson.

Beginning with the 2024–25 NHL season, select Utah Mammoth and Vegas Golden Knights games air on KGUN's Antenna TV subchannel—as with KNXV-TV in Phoenix—during conflicts with sister station KWBA-TV.

=== Analog-to-digital transition ===
KGUN-TV ended regular programming on its analog signal, over VHF channel 9, on June 12, 2009, as part of the federally mandated transition from analog to digital television; KGUN moved its digital signal from its pre-transition UHF channel 35 to VHF channel 9.

=== Translator ===
Since 1967, KGUN-TV has operated a translator on Tumamoc Hill, now K27OP-D on channel 27. This facility, which originally operated on channel 77, was established for the benefit of viewers in the Catalina Foothills, who are shaded from the Mount Bigelow transmitter by terrain.
