= KUAZ =

Public radio station in Tucson, Arizona

KUAZ and KUAZ-FM
Tucson, Arizona; United States
- Broadcast area: Tucson metropolitan area
- Frequencies: KUAZ: 1550 kHz; KUAZ-FM: 89.1 MHz (HD Radio)

Programming
- Format: Public radio
- Subchannels: KUAZ-FM: HD2: Jazz; HD3: BBC World Service
- Affiliations: National Public Radio; Public Radio Exchange

Ownership
- Owner: University of Arizona; (Arizona Board of Regents)
- Sister stations: KUAT-FM; KUAT-TV

History
- First air date: KUAZ: June 26, 1961; KUAZ-FM: April 27, 1992
- Former call signs: KUAZ: KFIF (1961–1968); KUAT (1968–2000)
- Call sign meaning: University of Arizona

Technical information
- Licensing authority: FCC
- Facility ID: KUAZ: 2723; KUAZ-FM: 3383
- Class: KUAZ: D; KUAZ-FM: A
- Power: KUAZ: 50,000 watts (day)
- ERP: KUAZ-FM: 1,600 watts
- HAAT: KUAZ-FM: 187.0 meters (613.5 ft)
- Transmitter coordinates: KUAZ: 32°22′21″N 111°5′52″W; KUAZ-FM: 32°12′53″N 111°0′21″W
- Translator(s): See below
- Repeater(s): see below

Links
- Public license information: KUAZ: Public file; LMS; KUAZ-FM: Public file; LMS
- Webcast: Listen live} Listen live (KUAZ-FM HD2)
- Website: radio.azpm.org/kuaz/ radio.azpm.org/jazz/ (KUAZ-FM HD2)

KUAZ and KUAZ-FM are public radio stations in Tucson, Arizona, owned by the University of Arizona. KUAZ transmits on 1550 kHz on the AM dial, and KUAZ-FM is at 89.1 MHz on the FM dial. The stations simulcast a radio format of news and information, as a member of National Public Radio. KUAZ-AM-FM carry such popular NPR shows as All Things Considered, Morning Edition, 1A and Fresh Air with Terry Gross.

KUAZ's transmitter is located in Marana, while KUAZ-FM's transmitter is located in Tucson. Programming is also heard on KUAS-FM at 88.9 MHz in Sierra Vista, KUAE-FM at 91.7 MHz in Safford, as well as three low-power FM translators that fill in service gaps around Tucson and Southeastern Arizona.

== History ==
As a construction permit, 1550 AM began as KSWC, but changed its call sign to KFIF before signing on the air on June 25, 1961. It was owned by the Southwest Broadcasting Corporation.

In 1967, John B. Walton, who had bought KFIF in 1965, also bought a station at 580 AM, which he would christen KIKX. The station on 580 could operate 24 hours a day. Walton then donated 1550 AM to the University of Arizona. The station became KUAT on October 7, 1968. KUAT initially had a format of classical music and jazz. When KUAT-FM went on the air in 1975, the FM played all classical music and the AM went all jazz.

The U of A put 89.1 FM on the air in Sierra Vista on April 27, 1992. It took the call sign KUAZ-FM, so as to distinguish itself from KUAT-FM. The AM station adopted the KUAZ calls on August 11, 2000.

== Repeaters ==
On October 11, 2018, after an 11-year process, KUAS-FM 88.9 came to air for the first time, broadcasting to Sierra Vista, Bisbee, Benson, Huachuca City, and Douglas. Previously, Sierra Vista received KUAZ via translator K217GI (91.3 MHz).

A second translator, K283DC at 104.5 MHz, fills service gaps in the Catalina and Saddlebrooke areas to the north of Tucson and began operating in 2019.

A second repeater, KUAE-FM 91.7, signed on the air on December 18th, 2025, covering southeastern Arizona to fill significant gaps in public radio coverage in Graham and Greenlee counties.

Call sign	Frequency	City of license	FID	ERP (W)	HAAT	Class	Transmitter coordinates	FCC info
KUAS-FM (HD)	88.9 FM	Sierra Vista, Arizona	173449	1,700	675.1 m (2,215 ft)	C2	31°28′51.7″N 109°57′31.3″W	LMS
KUAE-FM	91.7 FM	Safford, Arizona	768297	250	3,048 m (10,000 ft)	C2	32°38′59.8″N 109°50′54.7″W	LMS

Broadcast translators for KUAZ-FM
Call sign	Frequency	City of license	FID	ERP (W)	Class	FCC info
K217GI	91.3 FM	Sierra Vista, Arizona	2720	82	D	LMS
K283DC	104.5 FM	Catalina, Arizona	201630	250	D	LMS

Broadcast translator for KUAS-FM
Call sign	Frequency	City of license	FID	ERP (W)	Class	FCC info
K202EM	88.3 FM	Bisbee–Douglas, Arizona	3391	70	D	LMS
