= KTVK =

Television station in Phoenix, Arizona

- Phoenix, Arizona; United States
- Channels: Digital: 24 (UHF); Virtual: 3
- Branding: 3TV; Arizona's Family

Programming
- Affiliations: 3.1: Independent; for others, see § Subchannels

Ownership
- Owner: Gray Media; (Gray Television Licensee, LLC)
- Sister stations: KPHO-TV, KPHE-LD

History
- First air date: February 28, 1955
- Former channel number: Analog: 3 (VHF, 1955–2009)
- Former affiliations: ABC (1955–1995); Fox Kids (secondary, 1994–1995); The WB (January–September 1995)
- Call sign meaning: "Because TV will be our middle name" —Ernest McFarland

Technical information
- Licensing authority: FCC
- Facility ID: 40993
- ERP: 1,000 kW
- HAAT: 501 m (1,644 ft)
- Transmitter coordinates: 33°20′1″N 112°3′48″W
- Translator(s): see § Translators

Links
- Public license information: Public file; LMS
- Website: www.azfamily.com

KTVK (channel 3) is an independent television station in Phoenix, Arizona, United States. It is owned by Gray Media alongside CBS affiliate KPHO-TV (channel 5) and low-power station KPHE-LD (channel 44), a grouping known as "Arizona's Family". The three stations share studios on North Seventh Avenue in Uptown Phoenix; KTVK's transmitter is located on South Mountain on the city's south side. The station's signal is relayed across northern Arizona on a network of translator stations.

KTVK signed on in 1955 as the fourth and last commercial VHF station in Phoenix. Owned by a syndicate fronted by former U.S. senator and newly elected governor Ernest McFarland, it took over as Phoenix's ABC affiliate. After spending its first three decades as an also-ran, it poached several employees from then-dominant KTSP-TV in 1985, beginning a surge that made it the market leader by 1990. It lost its ABC affiliation as part of a shuffle of networks in 1994 and 1995 but has since prospered as an independent. It was one of the last family-owned major-market TV stations, being owned in part or whole by the McFarland-Lewis family from its inception until 1999.

The Belo Corporation acquired KTVK in 1999 and also took over KASW (channel 61), which KTVK had been programming since it began broadcasting four years prior. After Belo merged with Gannett, owner of KPNX and The Arizona Republic, the station was briefly owned by former general manager Jack Sander but was sold to the Meredith Corporation, separating it from KASW and merging it with KPHO-TV. KPHO-TV moved into the newer, larger KTVK studios; the "Arizona's Family" brand associated with channel 3 was extended to cover both stations, which began sharing news resources. In 2023, Gray Television's Phoenix stations became the new television home of the Phoenix Suns of the NBA.

== History ==
=== Early years ===
Channel 3 was the last commercial VHF allocation in Phoenix, Arizona, to be awarded. Prior to the 1948 freeze on new TV applications, there had been one application made, from radio station KTAR, one of the state's largest. In February 1953, however, after the freeze was lifted, a second applicant filed for the channel: the Arizona Television Company. That put the plans of KTAR—which already had television equipment on order—on hold. Originally owned by Buckeye rancher and car dealer Ralph Watkins as well as two other principals, a new stockholder was added to the company in May: former senator Ernest McFarland, who bought a 40 percent interest. Also seeking channel 3 was Herb Askins, a local businessman, but his Desert Advertising Co. dropped out late in the year, setting up a high-stakes showdown between Phoenix's NBC radio affiliate and the McFarland group in hearings in February 1954.

The staring contest, however, ended two months later. KTAR owner John J. Louis was unwilling to go through a hearing process to get a television sister for his radio station. Instead, in late April, he announced that KTAR would purchase Mesa-based NBC affiliate KTYL-TV (channel 12), for $250,000, effectively awarding the channel 3 allocation to the Arizona Television Company. With no other applications to consider, a Federal Communications Commission (FCC) hearing examiner recommended the company be granted a construction permit weeks later. The permit was duly granted on June 11.

The transmitter was built atop South Mountain, and a $500,000 studio building was constructed at 16th Street and Osborn Road. The station affiliated with ABC, filling a void that would have been created when existing ABC outlet KOOL-TV announced plans to change to CBS. By the time KTVK began broadcasting on February 28, 1955, McFarland had been elected Governor of Arizona. Channel 3 boasted the first color-equipped studios in Phoenix and the largest in the state.

I've been an officer since the outset and the first ten years we saw nothing but red ink.

— Delbert Lewis, on the station's early years

Channel 3 lost money in its early years. Unlike its three competitors, it did not have a long-established radio sister on which to draw revenue. According to a 1990 interview, in the early 1960s, Walter Cronkite sought to buy a stake in the Arizona Television Company. He would have become KTVK's main anchor, with a salary of $25,000 a year. However, Arizona Television Company could not afford to meet Cronkite's salary demands.

McFarland bought out the remaining partners in the Arizona Television Company in 1977. Long before then, McFarland had intended for KTVK to be a locally focused station. As Delbert Lewis, husband of McFarland's adopted daughter, Jewell, put it in a 1978 interview with The Arizona Republic, his father-in-law wanted channel 3 to be "a family corporation. All Arizonans. To keep it local." In an era when the television industry was already dominated by large station groups, Lewis said that his family took pride in the fact that major decisions were made in Phoenix, not in New York.

The socially laudatory aims of the McFarland-Lewis family initially did not translate into ratings success. Channel 3 spent most of its first 30 years stubbornly in third place. In January 1985, Arizona Republic television columnist Bud Wilkinson referred to the station as a "blot on [ABC]'s affiliate ledger" and claimed, citing a conversation with a top network executive, that the network had occasionally tried to move to another station and still was interested in the idea.

=== The rise ===
In March 1984, Delbert Lewis and Jewell McFarland Lewis were named the conservators of McFarland's estate, just three months before the former governor and senator died. In the preceding decade, Delbert Lewis had taken the reins of the station; he was named president of the Arizona Television Company in 1975 and assumed the role of general manager in 1980. McFarland ceded day-to-day control of the station to his relatives after undergoing brain surgery in 1977, shortly after buying out his partners. Upon McFarland's death, the Lewises inherited full control of KTVK. Eventually, Jewell and Delbert held a 60 percent controlling interest in the Arizona Television Company, with the remaining 40 percent divided between their four children. In 1986, Lewis made the most consequential hires in channel 3's history when he poached a dozen employees from long-dominant KTSP-TV. Included in the raid were KTSP's news director, Bill Miller, and his assistant news director, Phil Alvidrez. Miller became KTVK's station manager, while Alvidrez became KTVK's news director.

Under Miller and Alvidrez, the station relaunched its news department as NewsChannel 3 and began a climb to the top of the ratings. The station dismissed its existing weeknight news anchor team and rolled out a new lineup, led by new hire Cameron Harper and former weekend anchor Heidi Foglesong. Lewis bankrolled major investments in people, syndicated programming and equipment and dramatically boosted KTVK's promotional budget. He had no qualms about spending what he believed it would take to increase KTVK's profile; in 1990, he told The Republic that if Miller and others showed that they needed something, he would ensure that they would get it. As a "one-man board of directors", he was able to make decisions in mere minutes that took years at KTVK's corporate-owned competitors. For example, when Miller sought a new $500,000 satellite truck, Lewis greenlighted it in only 15 minutes. Improvement started slowly but was noticeable by 1988. Even those changes almost came too slowly for ABC; as late as 1989, ABC executives were in negotiations to move from KTVK to KTSP-TV.

The changes finally began to pay off by the November 1990 sweeps period. KTVK's 10 p.m. newscast surged to first place, and its early evening newscasts were posting the strongest numbers in their history. Channel 3 also was the most-watched station in the Valley in prime time, even as NBC won its 11th consecutive sweeps period nationally. A year later, it tied KTSP-TV in the early evening timeslot and took the lead in the morning. By February 1992, channel 3 had pulled ahead of channel 10 at 6 p.m.; it was the first time on record that channel 10 had lost that timeslot.

The growth of the company fueled additional media acquisitions. In the span of a year, the Arizona Television Company bought Phoenix Magazine and radio station KESZ (99.9 FM), as well as a production studio. Reorganizing as Media America Corp. (and later MAC America Communications), the group also handled programming responsibilities for the new KTWC (103.5 FM) when it signed on in 1994.

=== Going independent ===
On May 23, 1994, New World Communications and Fox announced a pact that would see KSAZ-TV leave its longtime affiliation with CBS to join Fox. The landmark deal also left CBS looking for new affiliates in several other markets, including Detroit, Cleveland, and Tampa, and set off a mad dash to secure network affiliations. KTVK was at a distinct disadvantage in the ensuing affiliate shuffle even though it was now one of the strongest ABC affiliates in the country. By this time, it had firmly established itself as the Valley's news leader, and its overall ratings were 20 points ahead of the runner-up. However, even though channel 3 had left its ratings-challenged past far behind, its gains over the previous decade meant little in the affiliate shuffle. It took place in an environment which favored station groups with presences in multiple cities, not KTVK—by this time, one of the last family-owned major-market stations in the country.

I hope they [ABC] don't have to pull [the affiliation] on you guys but Scripps has a gun to their head. It would cost us half a rating point on Jennings if we lose Cleveland and Detroit.

— ABC vice president Bryce Rathbone to KTVK general manager Bill Miller, June 7, 1994

In this environment, Scripps-Howard Broadcasting, owner of displaced Fox affiliate KNXV-TV, found itself in a strong position. Scripps owned two powerful bargaining chips in its successful and longstanding ABC affiliates in Detroit and in Cleveland. Both stations were being heavily pursued by CBS, which was about to lose its longstanding New World-owned affiliates to Fox. KTVK was already in talks for a new affiliation agreement with ABC that would have more than doubled its hourly compensation rate, but it would still have been less than the network was offering to stations in markets much smaller than Phoenix. However, ABC pulled the offer off the table on the advice of its lawyers; a call with ABC network president Bob Iger revealed that Scripps-Howard—a longtime partner of the network—had threatened to flip its Detroit and Cleveland ABC affiliates to CBS unless ABC moved its Phoenix affiliation to KNXV-TV. Iger wanted to keep KTVK, but Tom Murphy, the CEO of Capital Cities/ABC, felt that he had to be able to offer the ABC affiliation in Phoenix to Scripps if necessary to avoid potential long-term damage to the ABC television network. Specifically, ABC officials feared losing as much as half a ratings point on ABC World News Tonight if Scripps made good on its threat to flip its Detroit and Cleveland stations to CBS.

I asked [Murphy] if there was anything we could do. He suggested that "you should light some candles".

— Bill Miller

Scripps-Howard would not relent from demanding the ABC affiliation for Phoenix and even refused $25 million from the network to "take Phoenix off the table". Ultimately, ABC gave in and awarded its affiliations in Phoenix, Tampa, and Baltimore to Scripps; in informing KTVK, Iger explained that they "had to" do so. The Lewises then sought to affiliate with CBS, which was about to be displaced from KSAZ. However, despite Tom Murphy's support and channel 3's stronger ratings, CBS ultimately chose a deal with group owner Meredith Corporation and its KPHO-TV. Meredith also provided CBS security in Kansas City, where the New World switches had dislodged the NBC affiliation, and an upgrade in the Flint, Michigan, market. Miller told The Republic that CBS gave its Phoenix affiliation to KPHO rather than face having to search for a new affiliate in Kansas City, though CBS officials denied this. According to Miller, KTVK would have been the obvious choice to take the CBS affiliation if CBS only had to consider "which two stations it wanted in Phoenix".

Over the second half of 1994, KTVK relinquished ABC programming to KNXV in stages. Good Morning America was the first ABC program to move to KNXV after KTVK displaced it with a new local morning newscast, Good Morning Arizona. KNXV then picked up World News Tonight and Nightline on December 12, the day after Fox programming moved to KSAZ. KTVK's nearly 40-year affiliation with ABC officially ended on January 9, 1995, when ABC's remaining non-news programming moved to KNXV.

Despite the loss of ABC programming, the Lewises and station management committed to build KTVK into one of the nation's top independents. The station spent some $100 million on new syndicated programming, including Mad About You and Frasier, as well as poaching the most popular shows in syndication at the time from KSAZ-TV—game shows Wheel of Fortune and Jeopardy!—and programming them in the prime time hour between 7 and 8 p.m. KTVK also broke ground on a new studio center to house its growing operations. The news department was expanded with 20 new staffers. Media America struck a local marketing agreement to operate the new KASW (channel 61) with The WB—which would air on KTVK until KASW launched in September 1995—and children's programming, and it launched the AZ News Channel, a cable offering on Cox Communications systems featuring breaking news and replays of KTVK newscasts that had been in the planning stages since 1993. Another large acquisition came in the form of sports rights to the expansion Arizona Diamondbacks baseball team, with channel 3 airing half of the team's games beginning in the 1998 season. The station remained Phoenix's news leader in most time slots, with the exception of 10 p.m., when strong NBC programming gave KPNX the lead.

In the fall of 1998, KTVK briefly aired The Howard Stern Radio Show; both KTVK (which aired the program after its 10 p.m. news) and Lubbock, Texas, Fox affiliate KJTV-TV pulled the program from their schedules after two episodes.

=== Belo ownership ===
We picked Belo because they were the most likely to leave the station alone.

— Bill Miller

In what Del Lewis described as "the most difficult decision our family has ever made", MAC America sold KTVK and its other remaining assets to the Belo Corporation of Dallas, Texas, for $315 million in July 1999–a handsome return on McFarland's investment 44 years earlier. The Lewises cited the costs of conversion to digital television, economies of scale that station groups had in purchasing syndicated programming, and competition from cable and satellite TV in their decision to sell; the transaction capped two years of selling the rest of the company, including Phoenix Magazine, the production facility, and the radio stations, which had suffered from the needed investments in programming and news expansion at KTVK. Later that year, Belo announced that it would purchase KASW from Gregory Brooks, forming the first television duopoly in the Phoenix market just as they were being legalized. Bill Miller retired a year later.

In 2000, Belo and Cox expanded their existing partnership with a new Spanish-language channel, ¡Más! Arizona, that launched on October 16 of that year. KTVK lost the Diamondbacks after the 2007 season, when the team opted to move all of its regional telecasts to cable on regional sports network Fox Sports Arizona (later Bally Sports Arizona).

=== Helicopter crash ===
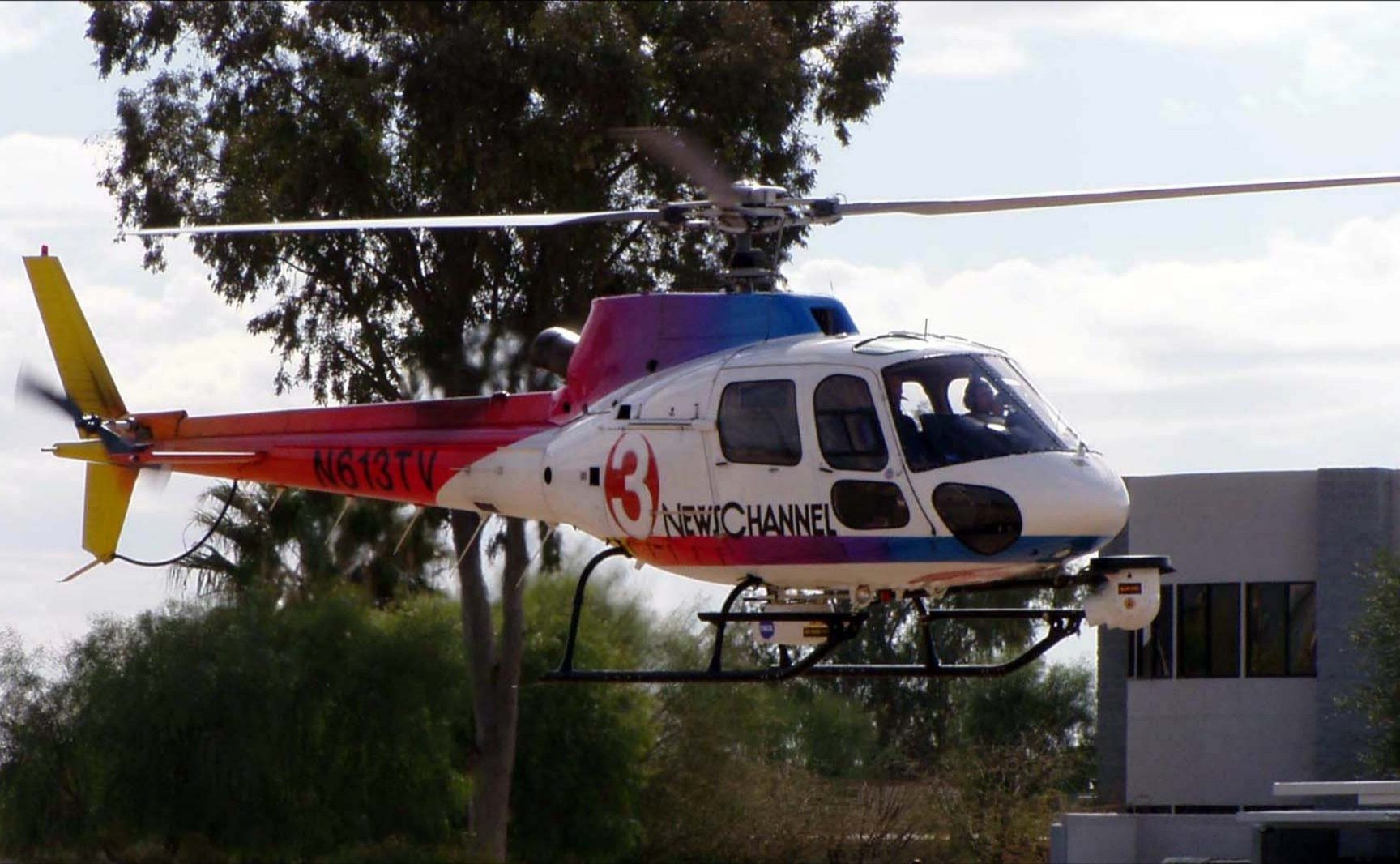
The KTVK helicopter, "Newschopper 3", destroyed in the 2007 collision

On July 27, 2007, KTVK's news helicopter "Newschopper 3" was involved in a mid-air collision when another news helicopter, belonging to KNXV-TV, struck it from behind. The collision occurred above Steele Indian School Park (near Third Street and Indian School Road), while both aircraft were covering a police pursuit in downtown Phoenix. All four people aboard both helicopters were killed, including KTVK pilot Scott Bowerbank and photographer Jim Cox. An investigation conducted by the Federal Aviation Administration (FAA) and National Transportation Safety Board (NTSB) determined that the accident was caused by both pilots' inability to see one another and avoid a collision with the other helicopter.

The helicopter collision resulted in the establishment of shared news helicopters in the Phoenix market; while KTVK initially shared a helicopter with KPHO-TV and KPNX, all four Phoenix news operations now share a single helicopter.

=== Sale to Meredith ===
On June 13, 2013, the Gannett Company, the owner of KPNX and the Arizona Republic, acquired Belo. As FCC rules restricted one company from owning more than two television stations in the same market, Gannett announced that it would spin off KTVK and KASW to Sander Media, LLC, a company operated by former Belo executive Jack Sander. While Gannett intended to provide services to the stations through a shared services agreement, KTVK and KASW's operations would have remained largely separate from KPNX and the Republic. Despite objections to the Gannett-Belo merger by anti-consolidation groups (such as Free Press) and pay television providers (due to ownership conflicts involving television stations and newspapers both companies owned in other markets, the use of Sander as a third-party licensee to buy stations that would be operated by the owner of a same-market competitor, concerns over any future operational consolidation of the stations involved in the deal, and the Gannett and Sander stations colluding in retransmission consent negotiations), the FCC granted approval of the deal on December 20.

As the sale was completed on December 23, 2013, Sander/Gannett then sold KTVK to the Meredith Corporation, owner of CBS affiliate KPHO-TV. The license assets of KASW were sold to SagamoreHill Broadcasting, with Meredith to operate that station through a shared services agreement. However, as a voluntary condition of the transaction's approval, that station was instead sold off to the Nexstar Broadcasting Group. The sale was approved on June 16, 2014, and completed on June 19. On August 7, 2014, Meredith bought the KTVK studios, with the intent of housing the combined operation at KTVK's larger and newer facility.

The union of KTVK and KPHO-TV's news operations, marketed under the "Arizona's Family" banner long associated with KTVK, came with the loss of 14 jobs across both stations. KPHO general manager Ed Munson headed the combined operation until his 2018 retirement.

=== Sale to Gray Television ===
On May 3, 2021, Gray Television announced its intent to purchase the Meredith Local Media division, including KTVK and KPHO, for $2.7 billion. These would be Gray's second and third stations in Arizona, having already bought KOLD-TV in Tucson. The sale was completed on December 1.

== Local programming ==
=== Newscasts ===
We were regularly fourth in a three-station market.

— Phil Alvidrez

From the beginning, KTVK placed a high premium on news. The McFarlands and Lewises saw themselves mostly as "newspeople, not TV people". Despite this, for most of its history, KTVK had been the third-rated local station for news and had "long been viewed as a loser" and "a joke" in the industry; the news programs had stints as Total News and later Eyewitness News. While the station briefly had momentum under news director Cecil Tuck in the early 1980s, it was unable to escape the ratings basement. The station frequently attempted to lure personalities from competing stations, with mixed results: Mary Jo West, the first female anchor in Phoenix at KOOL/KTSP, returned from a job at CBS News in 1983, but channel 3 was unsuccessful in hiring anchors from KPNX. West left in the summer of 1986.

The station managed to shed its third-place positioning and become the market leader after the hiring of Miller and Alvidrez in 1986. However, the loss of ABC affiliation led to major changes for KTVK's news department. Chief among them was the launch of a three-hour morning newscast, Good Morning Arizona; the program was initially hosted by Jodi Applegate, who would leave KTVK to host the weekend editions of The Today Show in 1996. By that time, Good Morning Arizona had beaten out all of its local and national competitors in the ratings. The station also transformed its 5 and 6 p.m. newscasts into the 90-minute Good Evening Arizona, and when KASW launched in 1995, KTVK produced a 9 p.m. newscast for the new station.

KTVK itself, however, was later to debut prime time news than many independent stations. In 1996, it instead relaunched its 10 p.m. newscast as Tonight Arizona, which later became NewShow and The News Show. This changed in 2008, when the station replaced 8 p.m. and 10 p.m. broadcasts with a 9 p.m. newscast and expanded Good Morning Arizona, bringing it to 52 hours a week of newscasts; a 10 p.m. broadcast was later reinstated in 2011.

KTVK was also involved with news production and simulcasts for the Tucson market when Belo owned and operated KMSB, Tucson's Fox affiliate. In 2003, KMSB began a 9 p.m. newscast, which originally was produced in Phoenix and used news reporting from KMSB-employed reporters and from Tucson NBC affiliate KVOA. Additionally, from 2003 to 2012, KMSB simulcast Good Morning Arizona.

=== Sports ===
Gray announced in January 2023 that it would launch the Arizona's Family Sports and Entertainment Network (AZFSEN) over KPHE-LD on March 1, 2023, and that it had acquired the rights to Phoenix Rising FC soccer; KPHE would air all 34 matches, with five simulcasts on KTVK and one on KPHO-TV.

On April 28, 2023, Gray announced that the rights to the Phoenix Suns and Phoenix Mercury would move from Bally Sports Arizona to KTVK and KPHE-LD beginning with the 2023 Phoenix Mercury season and 2023–24 Phoenix Suns season. The two stations together would carry all non-nationally televised games, with KTVK to carry at least 40 Suns games per season and 13 Mercury games per season; the contract also included provision for a streaming platform known as Kiswe to carry Suns and Mercury games. The parent company of Bally Sports Arizona, Diamond Sports Group, responded by claiming that the Suns/Mercury deal represented a breach of contract by not allowing Diamond to exercise its contractual rights in violation of bankruptcy law. The CEO of the Phoenix Suns and Mercury, Josh Bartelstein, had previously cited a "goal of wide distribution" for the teams in the face of cord cutting affecting the availability of RSNs. While a bankruptcy judge blocked the Suns portion of the deal, the Mercury portion was allowed to proceed. On July 14, the Suns announced that the Gray deal would go ahead, as Diamond Sports Group declined to match the contract.

=== Non-news programming ===
KTVK also airs a limited amount of non-news local programming. One of the station's offerings, the local pet adoption encouragement program Pets on Parade with the Arizona Humane Society, is the longest-running local TV show in Arizona, having first been broadcast in December 1958. In 2010, the station launched the weekly political program Politics Unplugged.

=== Notable former on-air staff ===
- Wally Bruner – newscaster (1960s)
- Jineane Ford – reporter
- Daryn Kagan – anchor
- Tony Kovaleski – reporter
- Samantha Mohr – meteorologist
- Christi Paul – anchor/consumer reporter
- Brandon Lee Rudat – anchor
- Lauren Sánchez – anchor/reporter
- Ray Scott – sportscaster and television play-by-play voice of ASU football in the 1980s

== Technical information ==
=== Subchannels ===
KTVK broadcasts from a transmitter facility on South Mountain. The station's signal is multiplexed:

Subchannels of KTVK
Subchannel	Res.	Short name	Programming
3.1	1080i	KTVK-HD	Main KTVK programming
3.2	480i	Comet	Comet
3.3	480i	Outlaw	Outlaw
3.4	480i	Paid Ad	Infomercials
3.5	1080i	Weather	Arizona's Family First Alert Weather NOW ● Arizona's Family Sports simulcast (live sporting events only)
61.3	480i	mystery	Ion Mystery (KASW)

Broadcast on behalf of another station

On October 20, 2009, KTVK added This TV to its 3.2 digital subchannel. This TV was dropped on April 13, 2015, and replaced with a 24/7 loop of local news—the former Arizona NewsChannel. On the same day, sister station KPHO's former 24/7 weather service, moved to KTVK's 3.3 digital subchannel. It was dropped from KPHO in favor of Cozi TV. On August 1, 2017, the local news loop on 3.2 was replaced by the sci-fi network Comet.

KTVK joined the Phoenix ATSC 3.0 lineup on July 8, 2021, on the KFPH-CD multiplex. On that date, as part of rebalancing of its subchannels, the KASW subchannel of Ion Mystery was moved to the KTVK multiplex.

=== Analog-to-digital conversion ===
KTVK ended regular programming on its analog signal, over VHF channel 3, on June 12, 2009, the official date on which full-power television stations in the United States transitioned from analog to digital broadcasts under federal mandate. The station's digital signal continued to broadcast on its pre-transition UHF channel 24, using virtual channel 3.

As part of the SAFER Act, KTVK kept its analog signal on the air to inform viewers of the digital television transition through a loop of public service announcements from the National Association of Broadcasters. KTVK's "nightlight" service was originally intended to last 30 days but was instead discontinued two weeks after the analog-to-digital transition, on June 26.

=== Translators ===
KTVK is rebroadcast on the following translator stations:

- Bullhead City (Katherine Landing): K12OF-D
- Bullhead City (Oatman–Goldroad Crest): K16EV-D
- Camp Verde, etc.: K32ME-D
- Cottonwood: K28OA-D
- Flagstaff: K25MG-D
- Globe–Miami: K14NA-D
- Kingman: K23FV-D
- Lake Havasu City: K29FD-D
- Meadview (Patterson Slope): K25DH-D
- Prescott: K11LC-D
- Williams–Ash Fork: K15HY-D

== See also ==
- List of news aircraft crashes
