= KIKX (Arizona) =

AM radio station in Tucson, Arizona (1947–1982)

- Tucson, Arizona; United States
- Frequency: 580 kHz

Ownership
- Owner: John B. Walton; (Walton Broadcasting, Inc.)

History
- First air date: April 10, 1947
- Last air date: July 18, 1982
- Former call signs: KCNA (1947–1959); KTAN (1959–1967)
- Former frequencies: 1340 kHz (1947–1951)
- Call sign meaning: Sounds like "kicks"

Technical information
- Facility ID: 191203
- Power: 5,000 watts day; 500 watts night
- Transmitter coordinates: 32°17′36″N 110°53′40″W

KIKX was a radio station on 580 kHz in Tucson, Arizona, which operated from April 10, 1947, until closing on July 18, 1982. The station lost its Federal Communications Commission license due to a 1974 kidnapping hoax involving one of the station's disc jockeys.

== History ==
=== As KCNA and KTAN ===
The Catalina Broadcasting Corporation signed on KCNA at 1340 kHz on April 10, 1947. It broadcast with 250 watts from a transmitter located at Cherry Avenue and 16th Street, using an RCA transmitter that was boasted to be the largest ever shipment in that company's history, and at the time, it was Tucson's only locally owned radio station. KCNA initially presented popular and classical music, along with hourly news reports. On November 8, 1951, KCNA relocated to 580 kHz, where it was able to raise daytime power to 5,000 watts and operate at night with 500 watts; its transmitter moved to a three-tower site along Swan Road, and that same year, the station became the broadcaster of the University of Arizona Wildcats football team. The relocated, higher-power KCNA, an ABC affiliate, advertised its coverage as including areas as distant as Phoenix, Lordsburg, New Mexico, and Caborca, Sonora.

The new KCNA transmitter site was built with a television saddle on the middle tower to accommodate a future TV station. In 1952, KCNA applied for a television license and received a construction permit to build KCNA-TV, which would have broadcast on VHF channel 9 and expected to start operations in the fall of 1953. As late as April 1953, KCNA reported it was buying television equipment with an aim to sign on in December. On August 31, 1953, the directors of the Catalina Broadcasting Corporation unanimously agreed to surrender their construction permit, believing market conditions made it "impossible at this time to operate a third television station in the Tucson area"; though they said they expected to reapply for a television station when Tucson could support it, this never came to be. That same year, control of the station was transferred to fiction writer Erskine Caldwell. (Channel 9 would eventually be occupied by KGUN-TV beginning in 1956.)

In 1956, the station was sold to Harry B. and George B. Chambers, who changed the call sign to KTAN in 1959. Ownership quipped of the new designation, "We've just changed our call letters to go with Tucson's climate".

=== Sale to Walton and early KIKX years ===
John B. Walton, Jr. bought KTAN in April 1967, promptly donating his former daytimer KFIF (1550 AM) to the University of Arizona . On May 1, 1967, KTAN signed off, being replaced on May 18 with a relocated KFIF under a new call sign, KIKX (meaning "Kicks Radio"); the new station did not retain KTAN's NBC affiliation, which transferred to KCEE, but it did move into KTAN's studios at the Sands Hotel. During this time, Shadoe Stevens was one of the radio station's DJs and for a time was its program director. By 1971, KIKX maintained an affiliation with the Mutual Broadcasting System, but by 1974, it was affiliated with the ABC Contemporary network and carried a Top 40/rock format.

=== 1974 kidnapping promotion ===
A 1974 promotion gone wrong would ultimately be the catalyst for the station's demise. The promotion announced the kidnapping of one of the station's DJs, Gary Craig (real name Arthur Gopen), who at that time had taken over KIKX's morning show; the intention was that Craig would "disappear", call into the station from Miami, and then call in from various cities on his way back to Tucson, with lucky listeners who were able to identify the cities winning prizes. Regular newscasts beginning on Saturday, January 19, 1974, reported his kidnapping. Concerned listeners contacted the Tucson Police Department, which was initially told by station staff that the DJ had indeed been kidnapped; their phone lines were tied up with calls about the alleged crime. Station staff became concerned, but the program director allowed the promotion to continue; the general manager did not know about the complaints until he returned to work after the weekend. After the Federal Communications Commission (FCC) announced an investigation on January 22, the station canceled the promotion, broadcasting apologies from the general manager and from station owner Walton; the station also fired all of the staff responsible for the incident. A 2011 book described the plot as "one of the dumbest ideas in the history of radio".

That year, the station had filed for its license renewal; in December, the FCC designated the renewal for hearing. Various allegations came up against the station, with technical violations, failure to mention sponsorships, and poor logging of commercials arising as concerns. The FCC additionally charged that Gopen had signed program logs using a false name and that the station had broadcast a telephone call without informing the other party that the call would be broadcast. That summer, the scope of the license hearing widened when the Black Media Coalition of Tucson filed a petition to deny, saying KIKX did not have an affirmative action program. The kidnapping hoax, however, dominated the hearing. In October 1976, administrative law judge Thomas B. Kirkpatrick ruled that the renewal of KIKX's license would not serve the public interest, stating that KIKX's "arrogant disregard for the public cannot be too strongly condemned". The station remained on air as Walton appealed to the FCC; it also transitioned to a country format on September 17, 1977 and switched its ABC network from Contemporary to Entertainment.

=== Denial of final appeals, closure, and Emergency Broadcast System incident ===
This is a country music station without an identity and hardly any rating. Too bad.

— David Hatfield, The Arizona Daily Star, in a summary of Tucson radio ratings published six days before KIKX's final signoff

In 1980, the FCC by a majority vote denied Walton's appeal, stating that Walton had demonstrated a lack of control over his station; two commissioners, Anne P. Jones and James H. Quello, dissented. KIKX was now one of a handful of stations whose licenses had been revoked for a hoax. The case continued in the courts, where a divided federal appeals court upheld the revocation of the station's license. Despite initially stating his intentions to take the case to the Supreme Court, Walton had enough. He telephoned general manager Jim Scopac, expressing that he had decided to "just take it off" the air. On Friday, the station's employees were informed of the station's closure and opted to keep it a secret. Walton's fight to retain the station had cost more than $250,000 ($976,878 in 2025 dollars). Another contributing factor to the station's closure was its low ratings; in the station's last appearance in a ratings book—the Spring 1982 Arbitron survey—KIKX, with a 0.7 rating, ranked dead last among Tucson's radio stations. In the same survey, its country competitor KCUB garnered a 9.0 rating.

At midnight on Sunday, July 18, 1982, KIKX went off the air. "The Last Cowboy Song" by Ed Bruce was the final song played over KIKX.

KIKX's shutdown left a gap in Emergency Broadcast System (EBS) coverage for Pima and Santa Cruz counties, as KIKX was the originating station for EBS alerts to those two counties. When emergency officials surveyed 10 local media outlets on Monday, July 19, they found five were still monitoring the silent frequency for EBS alerts, while the other five were monitoring KTKT, the designated backup station; the station's studios also had equipment and bombproofing supplied as part of its EBS role.

== Reuse of the frequency 580 kHz ==
The 580 kHz frequency occupied by KIKX remained vacant for five years, but it was still sought due to the station's low frequency and good coverage of southern Arizona.

In 1986, a proposal to revive the frequency on a new license, made by Elliott-Phelps Broadcasting Corporation, was granted over an objection, claiming the applicant had incorrectly stated the defunct radio station's transmitter facilities were available when they had been sold to a real estate developer. This station was built in 1987 with callsign KJMM; it is now KSAZ, which in 1991 was approved to move from the KIKX site to Marana.

== See also ==
- KSAZ, KIKX's eventual replacement at 580 kHz, which signed on in 1987 as KJMM, using the old KIKX facilities
