= Mount Bigelow (Arizona) =

Landform in Pima County, Arizona

- Location within Arizona

Highest point
- Elevation: 8,552 ft (2,607 m) NAVD 88
- Prominence: 760 ft (232 m)
- Coordinates: 32°24′56″N 110°42′52″W

Geography
- Location: Pima County, Arizona, U.S.
- Parent range: Santa Catalina Mountains
- Topo map: USGS Mount Bigelow

Mount Bigelow is a mountain in the Santa Catalina Mountains of Arizona, United States. It is home to the astronomical observing facility Catalina Station which operates the 61" Kuiper Telescope owned by the Steward Observatory of the University of Arizona. It is one of the telescopes used by students at Astronomy Camp.
