= 92.9 FM =

FM radio frequency

The following radio stations broadcast on FM frequency 92.9 MHz:

== Argentina ==
- Activa in Rosario, Santa Fe
- Carrodilla in Carrodilla, Mendoza
- La Red in Presidencia Roque Sáenz Peña, Chaco
- Pacífico in Salta
- Peregrina in Buenos Aires
- Radio María in Lincoln, Buenos Aires
- Radio María in Comodoro Rivadavia, Chubut
- Radio María in Bella Vista, Corrientes
- Radio María in Chilecito, La Rioja
- Radio María in Monteros, Tucumán
- Radio María in Sierra Grande, Río Negro
- Red de la costa in Santa Clara del Mar, Buenos Aires
- Soft in Catamarca
- Universidad in Santiago del Estero
- UNJu in San Salvador de Jujuy, Jujuy

== Australia ==
- 92.9 FM Tamworth in Tamworth
- ABC Classic in Sydney
- 92.9 Voice of the Family in Toowoomba
- Triple J in Hobart
- Triple M Perth
- Triple J in Albany

== Canada (Channel 225) ==
- CBBK-FM in Kingston, Ontario
- CBFA-FM-2 in Obedjiwan, Quebec
- CBTR-FM in Roddickton, Newfoundland and Labrador
- CBX-1-FM in Bonnyville, Alberta
- CBYE-FM in Logan Lake, British Columbia
- CFEX-FM in Calgary, Alberta
- CFLT-FM in Dartmouth, Nova Scotia
- CFSH-FM in Apsley, Ontario
- CFWJ-FM in Sault Ste. Marie, Ontario
- CHTG-FM in Haldimand, Ontario
- CHYK-FM-3 in Hearst, Ontario
- CIBW-FM in Drayton Valley, Alberta
- CINR-FM in Norway House, Manitoba
- CJFW-FM-1 in Kitimat, British Columbia
- CJFW-FM-3 in Sandspit, British Columbia
- CJFW-FM-4 in Masset, British Columbia
- CJFW-FM-5 in Burns Lake, British Columbia
- CJFW-FM-6 in Smithers, British Columbia
- CJLR-FM-5 in Yorkton, Saskatchewan
- CKBL-FM in Saskatoon, Saskatchewan
- CKIC-FM in Winnipeg, Manitoba
- CKLE-FM in Bathurst, New Brunswick
- CKSB-1-FM in Ste-Rose-du-Lac, Manitoba
- VF2001 in La Ronge, Saskatchewan
- VF2006 in Boston Bar, British Columbia
- VF2282 in Kitwanga, British Columbia
- VF2496 in Stewart, British Columbia
- VF2507 in Creston, British Columbia
- VF2515 in Nakusp, British Columbia

== China ==
- CNR The Voice of China in Liaoyang
- Zhaoqing News & General Radio in Zhaoqing

== Honduras ==
- Estereo Clase 92.9 FM San Pedro Sula, Cortés, Honduras
- Estereo Clase 92.9 FM Puerto Cortés, Cortés, Honduras

== Japan ==
- JOSF in Nagoya, Aichi

== Malaysia ==
- Hitz in Klang Valley and Eastern Pahang
- Radio Klasik in Kuching, Sarawak
- Sabah FM in Sandakan, Sabah
- TraXX FM in Eastern Johor

== Mexico ==
- XEQ-FM in Mexico City
- XHBTA-FM in Bahía de Tortugas, Baja California Sur
- XHCDU-FM in Ciudad Acuña, Coahuila
- XHCRR-FM in Santiago Zoquiapan (Cerro Corral de Piedras), Oaxaca
- XHCSGK-FM in Ures, Sonora
- XHECD-FM in Puebla, Puebla
- XHER-FM in Ciudad Cuauhtémoc, Chihuahua
- XHERG-FM in Ojo de Agua-Guadalupe, Nuevo León
- XHFAC-FM in Salvatierra, Guanajuato
- XHFZO-FM in Ensenada, Baja California
- XHGON-FM in Ciudad Obregón, Sonora
- XHJH-FM in Xalapa, Veracruz
- XHJZ-FM in Ciudad Jiménez, Chihuahua
- XHMZO-FM in Manzanillo, Colima
- XHSLC-FM in Salina Cruz, Oaxaca
- XHTXO-FM in Taxco, Guerrero
- XHUNES-FM in Durango, Durango
- XHYUC-FM in Mérida, Yucatán
- XHZE-FM in Santiago Ixcuintla, Nayarit

== Philippines ==
- DWVA in Cauayan, Isabela
- DYRU in Kalibo, Aklan
- DYCI in Guihulngan
- DYAU in Jagna, Bohol
- DXDZ in Iligan
- DXWB in Valencia, Bukidnon

== United States (Channel 225) ==
- KAFF in Flagstaff, Arizona
- KAMP-LP in St. Michael, Alaska
- KATF in Dubuque, Iowa
- KAYN-LP in Bay City, Oregon
- KBLQ in Logan, Utah
- KDBL in Toppenish, Washington
- KDCD in San Angelo, Texas
- KDCQ in Coos Bay, Oregon
- KDWR-LP in Desert Ridge, Arizona
- KEZQ in West Yellowstone, Montana
- KFAT (FM) in Anchorage, Alaska
- KFGY in Healdsburg, California
- KFSI in Rochester, Minnesota
- KFSO in Visalia, California
- KGPJ-LP in Grand Prairie, Texas
- KGRC in Hannibal, Missouri
- KHKF in Island City, Oregon
- KHLA in Jennings, Louisiana
- KHUD in Tucson, Arizona
- KISM in Bellingham, Washington
- KJCD-LP in Pine Ridge, South Dakota
- KJEE in Montecito, California
- KKBQ in Pasadena, Texas
- KKIA (FM) in Ida Grove, Iowa
- KKID in Salem, Missouri
- KKJM in Saint Joseph, Minnesota
- KKPK in Colorado Springs, Colorado
- KKXL in Grand Forks, North Dakota
- KLFM in Great Falls, Montana
- KLGT in Buffalo, Wyoming
- KLRH in Reno, Nevada
- KLSC in Malden, Missouri
- KMML in Cimarron, Kansas
- KMXN in Osage City, Kansas
- KMXQ in Socorro, New Mexico
- KNIN in Wichita Falls, Texas
- KOMG in Willard, Missouri
- KOUO-LP in Orderville, Utah
- KPAW in Warren AFB, Wyoming
- KPTE in Bayfield, Colorado
- KPUT in Mona, Utah
- KQRP-LP in Malakoff, Texas
- KROM in San Antonio, Texas
- KRQV in Tulsa, Oklahoma
- KRWH-LP in Sioux Falls, South Dakota
- KSCG-LP in Campbell, Texas
- KSCQ in Silver City, New Mexico
- KSDR in Watertown, South Dakota
- KSNZ in Shamrock, Texas
- KSPH in Springhill, Louisiana
- KTGL in Beatrice, Nebraska
- KTZA in Artesia, New Mexico
- KUZU-LP in Denton, Texas
- KVRE in Hot Springs Village, Arkansas
- KWRH-LP in Webster Groves, Missouri
- KXES-LP in Galena, Alaska
- KXFG in Sun City, California
- KYBR in Espanola, New Mexico
- KYFE-LP in Bentonville, Arkansas
- KYWS-LP in West Sacramento, California
- KYYE-LP in Garland, Texas
- KYYY in Bismarck, North Dakota
- KZBI in Marlin, Texas
- KZZU in Spokane, Washington
- WAAC (FM) in Valdosta, Georgia
- WBLX in Mobile, Alabama
- WBOS in Brookline, Massachusetts
- WBOX-FM in Varnado, Louisiana
- WBPM in Saugerties, New York
- WBUF in Buffalo, New York
- WCWV in Summersville, West Virginia
- WDCM-LP in Defiance, Ohio
- WDUP-LP in New London, Connecticut
- WDXO in Hazlehurst, Mississippi
- WECL in Lake Hallie, Wisconsin
- WEGX in Dillon, South Carolina
- WEHM in Manorville, New York
- WEMK-LP in Upper Gwynedd, Pennsylvania
- WEZF in Burlington, Vermont
- WEZQ in Bangor, Maine
- WGGT-LP in Philadelphia, Pennsylvania
- WGPG-LP in Battle Creek, Michigan
- WGTZ in Eaton, Ohio
- WIKX in Charlotte Harbor, Florida
- WJXA in Nashville, Tennessee
- WJZQ in Cadillac, Michigan
- WKZY in Chilton, Wisconsin
- WLMI in Grand Ledge, Michigan
- WLTJ in Pittsburgh, Pennsylvania
- WMFQ in Ocala, Florida
- WMFS-FM in Bartlett, Tennessee
- WMGS in Wilkes-Barre, Pennsylvania
- WNDV in South Bend, Indiana
- WNUZ-LP in Gap, Pennsylvania
- WOOM-LP in Philadelphia, Pennsylvania
- WPPS-LP in Oconto Falls, Wisconsin
- WQKA-LP in Pulteney, New York
- WRDX in Smyrna, Delaware
- WRGU-LP in Philadelphia, Pennsylvania
- WRLG-LP in Philadelphia, Pennsylvania
- WRPW in Colfax, Illinois
- WSCD in Duluth, Minnesota
- WSEI in Olney, Illinois
- WSKL in Veedersburg, Indiana
- WTPM in Aguadilla, Puerto Rico
- WTUG in Northport, Alabama
- WTWV-FM in Suffolk, Virginia
- WVHL in Farmville, Virginia
- WVLK-FM in Lexington, Kentucky
- WXCS-LP in Cambridge Springs, Pennsylvania
- WXDC in Berkeley Springs, West Virginia
- WYBO in Waynesboro, Georgia
- WYNW in Birnamwood, Wisconsin
- WYQE in Naguabo, Puerto Rico
- WZAY-LP in Rockledge, Florida
- WZGC in Atlanta, Georgia
- WZLA in Abbeville, South Carolina
- WZML-LP in Bryn Mawr, Pennsylvania
