= Radio Tokai =

Japanese radio station

JOOF
- Gifu, Japan; Japan
- Broadcast area: Gifu Prefecture
- Frequency: 1460kc
- Branding: Radio Tokai

Programming
- Language: Japanese
- Format: Commercial

Ownership
- Owner: Radio Tokai Co., Ltd.

History
- First air date: March 10, 1955
- Last air date: March 31, 1960

Technical information
- Licensing authority: MPT
- ERP: 1 kW

Radio Tokai (Japanese: ラジオ東海) was an AM radio station that operated in Gifu from 1955 to 1959. Originally it was known as Gifu Broadcasting Co., Ltd. (岐阜放送株式会社) (abbreviated GHK, no relation to the current Gifu Broadcasting System), then renamed in 1956 to Radio Tokai. It merged with Kinki Tokai Broadcasting in 1959 to form Tokai Radio Broadcasting and was replaced by the new station from Nagoya in 1960.

== History ==
GHK was established on 18 November 1954 and started broadcasting at 6am on 10 March 1955 using the callsign JOOF on 1460kc. Frequently, to avoid confusion with the NHK Gifu Broadcasting Station, it was often known as Gifu Private Broadcasting (ぎふみんかんほうそう). News were received from both the Gifu Times and the Chubu Nippon Shimbun.

On 1 October 1956, the station was renamed Radio Tokai (RTC). Simultaneously, its output increased from 100 watts to 1 kilowatt. At this stage, it also applied for a relay station in Hashima and a television station, but these plans were never achieved alone.

Both RTC and KTR jointly established Tōkai Television Broadcasting in February 1958, which included all three prefectures in the Tōkai television region (Aichi, Gifu and Mie) in its coverage. Moreover, the two stations broadcast with one kilowatt each, and they could not compete with CBC from Nagoya. The stations merged on 20 November 1959 and continued operating under the existing callsign until 31 March 1960. The following day, JOSF from Nagoya took over. The former GHK/RTC building remained in use for a long time as JOSF's Gifu offices.

Local commercial broadcasting from Gifu did not return until 24 December 1962, when GBS (Radio Gifu, later Gifu Broadcasting System, callsign JOZF), opened.
