= KWYS =

KWYS may refer to:

- KWYS (AM), a radio station (920 AM) licensed to serve West Yellowstone, Montana, United States
- KOUW, a radio station (102.9 FM) licensed to serve Island Park, Idaho, United States, which held the call sign KWYS-FM from 1998 to 2012
- the ICAO code for Yellowstone Airport
