= Kinki Tokai Broadcasting =

Japanese radio station

Kinki Tokai Broadcasting (JOXR)
- Tsu, Japan; Japan
- Broadcast area: Mie Prefecture
- Frequency: 860kc
- Branding: Kinki Tokai Broadcasting

Programming
- Language: Japanese
- Format: Commercial

History
- First air date: December 10, 1953
- Last air date: March 31, 1960

Technical information
- ERP: 1 kW

Kinki Tokai Broadcasting (Japanese: 近畿東海放送) was an AM radio station that operated in Tsu, Mie Prefecture, from 1953 to 1960. It merged with Radio Tokai (RTC) in 1959 and ceased separate broadcasting on 31 March 1960, forming Tokai Radio Broadcasting.

== History ==
The station was licensed in 1953 as Radio Mie Corporation (RMC) and began operating on 860kc on 10 December of that year. The station also had a relay in Ueno, JOXO.

On 7 July 1956, the station upgraded to 1 kilowatt during the day, later on 1 October to the same output all day. On 10 December 1956, the station was renamed Kinki Tokai Broadcasting.

Takahiro Ueno, a native of Hisai (which later merged with Tsu) worked as an announcer at the station in its phase as KTR. He was later known for his career at Chugoku Broadcasting starting in 1965.

In 1959, it and Radio Tokai agreed to merge to form the current Tokai Radio. Both stations broadcast with the same output (one kilowatt), but could not compete with CBC (JOAR) from Nagoya. The ultimate goal was to enable Nagoya to have two commercial radio stations. The two parties had previously agreed to set up Tōkai Television Broadcasting in 1958. The merger was on equal footing and took place on 20 November 1959, however, the two stations continued broadcasting separately until the end of the fiscal year, as temporary "affiliates" of the future JOSF (Tokai Radio) in Nagoya. The new station began broadcasting in earnest on 1 April 1960, retiring the callsigns JOXR from KTR and JOOF from GHK/RTC; the JOXR callsign now resides with Radio Okinawa upon Okinawa's reversion to Japanese rule in 1972.
