= XHFZO-FM =

Radio station in Ensenada, Baja California, Mexico

- Ensenada, Baja California; Mexico
- Frequency: 92.9 MHz
- Branding: Amor Mío 92.9 FM

Programming
- Format: Spanish & English Adult Contemporary / Spanish News / Talk
- Affiliations: Pacific Spanish Network

Ownership
- Owner: Grupo Uzivra; (Grupo Uzivra, S.A. de C.V.)

History
- First air date: 1994
- Call sign meaning: Francisco Zarco, Baja California, original locality of allocation

Technical information
- Licensing authority: CRT
- Class: B
- ERP: 15,000 watts
- HAAT: 335.75 m (1,101.5 ft)

Links
- Webcast: Listen live
- Website: amormio929fm.com.mx

XHFZO-FM is a Spanish & English Adult Contemporary language radio station in Ensenada, Baja California, Mexico, broadcasting on 92.9 FM. The station broadcasts from Cerro La Bufadora, located northwest of Ensenada.

== History ==
In March 1994, the Secretariat of Communications and Transportation awarded the rights to 92.9 MHz in Francisco Zarco, Baja California, to Rommel Arvizu Rashid. The station then signed on from Ensenada later that year, originally as Fiesta Mexicana with a Regional Mexican format. The station was briefly known as Radio Bosston from 2000 to 2001 and then as XS92.9 from 2001 to 2017.
