= Yellowstone Regional Airport =

Airport in Wyoming, United States

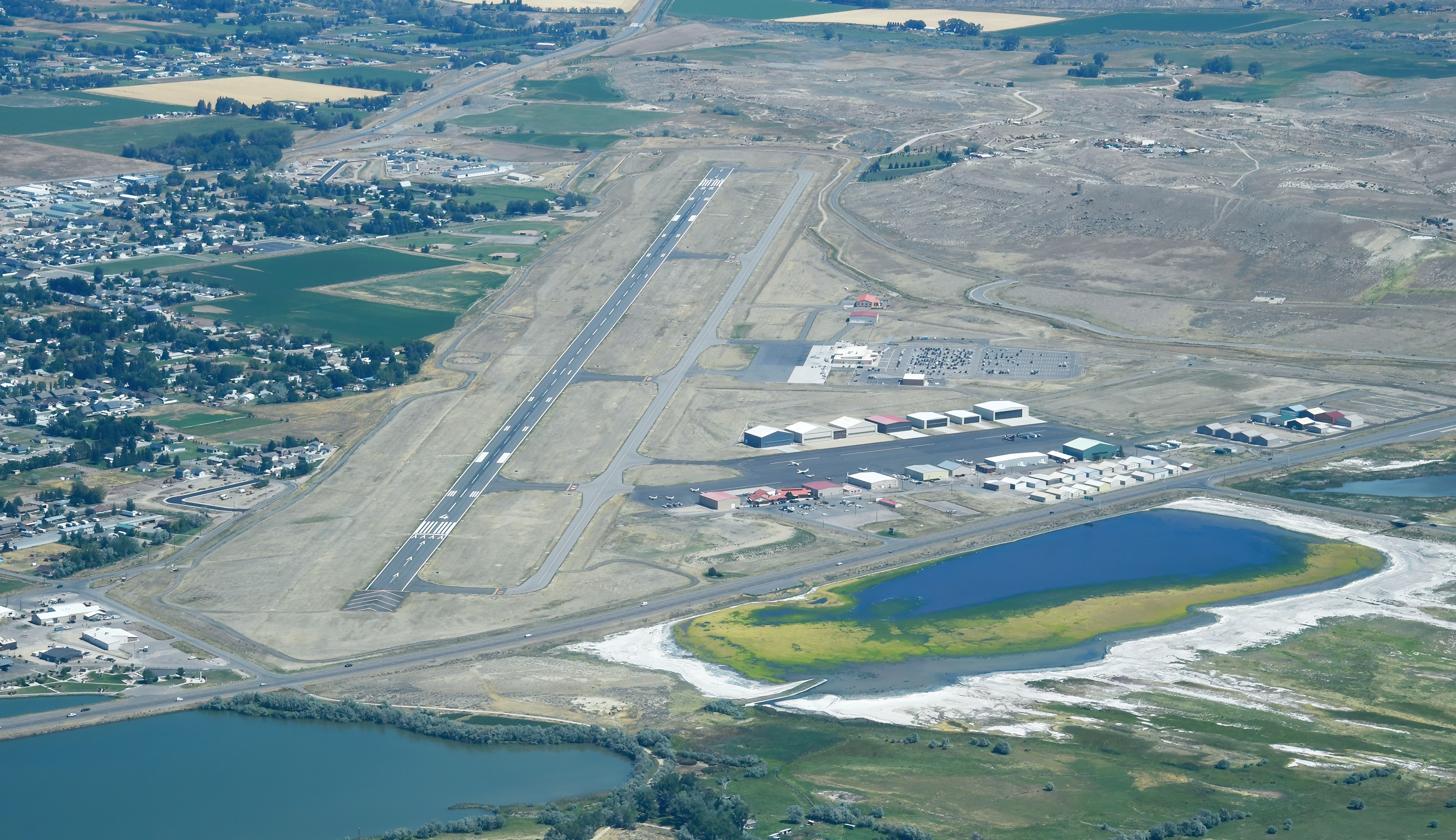
- IATA: COD; ICAO: KCOD; FAA LID: COD

Summary
- Airport type: Public
- Owner: City of Cody
- Serves: Cody, Wyoming
- Elevation AMSL: 5,102 ft (1,555 m)
- Coordinates: 44°31′13″N 109°01′26″W
- Website: www.FlyYRA.com

Map
- Location of airport in Wyoming COD (the United States)

Runways
Direction	Length		Surface
Direction	ft	m	Surface
4/22	8,268	2,520	Asphalt

Statistics (2021)
- Aircraft operations: 25,238
- Based aircraft: 75
- Source: Federal Aviation Administration

Yellowstone Regional Airport (IATA: COD, ICAO: KCOD, FAA LID: COD) is a public-use airport located in Cody, a city in Park County, Wyoming, United States, 2 nautical miles (3.7 km) southeast of the central business district of that city. It is the only commercial airport in Park County Wyoming. It is in northwestern Wyoming, about 53 miles from the east entrance of Yellowstone National Park.

The airport is owned by the city of Cody and is operated by the Yellowstone Regional Airport Joint Powers Board. This board was established in 1981 and is made up of seven members appointed by the Cody City Council and the Park County Commission. The daily operations of the airport are overseen by an Airport Manager, who is appointed by the board.

It should not be confused with Yellowstone Airport, located 104 miles (167 km) west near West Yellowstone, Montana, near the west entrance to Yellowstone National Park, or Bozeman Yellowstone International Airport, located 136 miles (219 km) northwest near Belgrade, Montana, on the outskirts of Bozeman.

== Facilities and aircraft ==
Yellowstone Regional Airport covers an area of 694 acres (281 ha) at an elevation of 5,102 feet (1,555 m) above mean sea level. It has one runway designated 4/22 with an asphalt surface measuring 8,268 by 100 feet (2,520 x 30 m).

For the 12-month period ending December 31, 2021, the airport had 25,238 aircraft operations, an average of 69 per day: 92% general aviation, 8% air taxi, <1% airline, and <1% military. At that time there were 75 aircraft based at this airport: 51 single-engine, 8 multi-engine, 11 jet, and 3 helicopter, plus 1 glider and 1 ultralight.

A new $12.5 million airport terminal opened in December 2010. 95% of the cost for the new terminal was paid with an FAA grant, 3% from the Wyoming State Aeronautics Division and the remaining 2% from the airport itself.

== Airline and destination ==
=== Passenger ===
Airlines	Destinations
United Express	Denver; Seasonal: Chicago

Destinations map
Destinations from Yellowstone Regional Airport
Red = Year-round destination
Green = Seasonal destination

== Statistics ==
=== Top destinations ===
Busiest domestic routes from COD (January 2025 – December 2025)
Rank	Airport	Passengers	Carrier
1	Denver, Colorado	35,350	United

== Accidents at or near COD ==
- On October 29, 2003, a Corporate Air Cessna 208 Caravan on an attempted approach crashed-landed on a highway just south of the airport in snowy and icy conditions and wound up inverted in Alkali Lake. The sole occupant, the pilot, was killed.

== See also ==
- List of airports in Wyoming
