= KDWR-LP =

Low-power radio station in Phoenix, Arizona

- Desert Ridge, Arizona; United States
- Frequency: 92.9 MHz
- Branding: Desert Word Radio

Programming
- Format: Bible readings

Ownership
- Owner: Walk and Talk, Inc.

History
- First air date: 2017
- Call sign meaning: Desert Word Radio

Technical information
- Licensing authority: FCC
- Facility ID: 195193
- Class: L1
- ERP: 100 watts
- HAAT: 22.59 meters
- Transmitter coordinates: 33°39′47″N 112°2′42.44″W

Links
- Public license information: LMS

KDWR-LP is a low-power FM radio station on 92.9 FM licensed to serve Desert Ridge, Arizona. The station is owned and operated by Walk and Talk, Inc., with transmitter on Cave Creek Road in Phoenix. It carries Bible readings as "Desert Word Radio".
