= Butte Special =

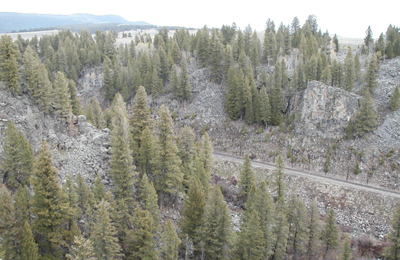
- Beaver Canyon on Monida Pass, part of the Butte Special's route

Overview
- Service type: Inter-city rail
- Status: Discontinued
- Locale: Western United States
- First service: 1921
- Last service: 1971
- Former operator(s): Union Pacific Railroad

Route
- Termini: Salt Lake City, Utah; Butte, Montana; branch to West Yellowstone, Montana
- Distance travelled: 397 miles (639 km)
- Service frequency: Daily
- Train number(s): 29 (northbound), 30 (southbound)

On-board services
- Seating arrangements: Reclining seat coaches
- Sleeping arrangements: Sections, double bedrooms, drawing rooms, compartments
- Catering facilities: Club-lounge car; Cafe-lounge car

Technical
- Track gauge: 4 ft 8 1/2 in (1,435 mm)

The Butte Special was a named passenger train on the Union Pacific Railroad running between Salt Lake City, Utah and Butte, Montana by way of Pocatello, Idaho on the UP's Montana Division. The train had a popular connection with the UP's Yellowstone Special at Idaho Falls, Idaho, where the Yellowstone bound train went east towards West Yellowstone, Montana and Yellowstone National Park. The Butte Special was the Union Pacific's only north-south passenger service.

== History ==
=== Typical Consist ===
The train's consist was formalized sometime in the 1920s, with the typical setup containing several mail cars, a Railway Post Office car, two or three reclining seat coaches, a cafe/lounge car, and up to three sleeper cars. Although the train served a relatively small population—with Butte having a population that peaked near 40,000 and Idaho Falls peaking over 60,000—it was as fully featured of a train as any that Union Pacific offered. Having Club-lounge cars, Cafe-lounge cars, sleeping arrangements, and more.

=== End of service ===
Union Pacific had tried cancelling the train as early as the 1960s, but they encountered little success in their efforts, and it eventually ran until Amtrak took over most of the United States' passenger rail service in 1971. As the service was beginning to wind down, the route lost its lucrative US Mail contract in 1967 and the train was no longer run daily, but three times per week. In its final days UP split the service with Northbound trains running on Thursday, Saturday, and Monday, and Southbound trains running Friday, Sunday, and Tuesday.

== Route ==
From Salt Lake City, the Butte Special ran north to Ogden, then crossed into Idaho to make stops in Pocatello, Blackfoot, Idaho Falls, Dubois, and Spencer before crossing Monida Pass into Montana. In Montana the train made stops in Lima, Armstead, Dillon, Melrose, and Silver Bow before finally ending in Butte. The Great Northern, Northern Pacific and the Milwaukee Road also served Butte, with each of them having passenger service. By 1970 the route had been condensed to only stop in Ogden, Pocatello, and Idaho Falls en route to Butte.

== Yellowstone Special ==
Though listed in timetables as a separate train, the Yellowstone Special was merely an extra set of coaches that split from the Butte Special, Portland Rose, or City of Portland in Pocatello and departed eastbound to West Yellowstone, Montana.
