= CFSH-FM =

Christian radio station in Apsley, Ontario

Coordinates: 44°45′54″N 78°05′27″W

- Apsley, Ontario; Canada
- Broadcast area: East Central Ontario
- Frequency: 92.9 MHz
- Branding: The Fish

Programming
- Format: Christian Contemporary

Ownership
- Owner: Apsley Community Chapel

History
- First air date: 2008 (license received)
- Call sign meaning: "Fish"

Technical information
- Class: LP
- ERP: 50 watts
- HAAT: 30 metres (98 ft)

CFSH-FM is a Christian radio station format that operates at 92.9 FM in Apsley, Ontario, Canada.

Known locally as 'CFSH Apsley 92.9 FM - The Fish' or 'CFSH FM Apsley - The Rock', this radio station serves an area of approximately 145 km^{2}. in East Central Ontario which physiographically is best characterised as a predominantly Pre-Cambrian Granitic Canadian Shield region in the Kawartha Lakes district of the province.

Owned by the Apsley Community Chapel, the station was given approval by the Canadian Radio-television and Telecommunications Commission (CRTC) on January 17, 2008.

Undated, the station signed on the air.
