= XHJZ-FM =

Radio station in Ciudad Jiménez, Chihuahua, Mexico

- Ciudad Jiménez, Chihuahua; Mexico
- Frequency: 92.9 FM
- Branding: La Campera

Programming
- Format: Regional Mexican

Ownership
- Owner: VMedia Comunicaciones; (Berenice Beltrán Berlanga)

History
- First air date: November 11, 1952 (concession)
- Call sign meaning: JZ from "Jiménez"

Technical information
- Licensing authority: CRT
- Class: B1
- ERP: 25 kW
- HAAT: 54.6 m (179 ft)
- Transmitter coordinates: 27°08′11″N 104°53′44″W

Links
- Webcast: Listen live
- Website: vmediacomunicaciones.com

XHJZ-FM is a radio station on 92.9 FM in Ciudad Jiménez, Chihuahua, Mexico. The station is owned by VMedia Comunicaciones and carries a regional Mexican format known as La Campera.

== History ==
XHJZ began as XEJZ-AM 1320, receiving its concession on November 11, 1952. It was owned by Elia Barraza de Rivas until 1966, when the concession transferred to María Elena Torres de Orpinel. The station would be owned by Torres (later known as Torres García) or her estate until 2012.

It migrated to FM in 2011 on 92.9 MHz. From 2012 to 2015, the station was owned by Jorge Cruz Ramos López.
