= XHJH-FM =

Radio station in Xalapa, Veracruz, Mexico

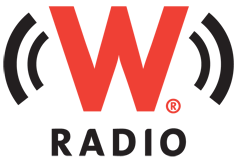
- Xalapa, Veracruz; Mexico
- Frequency: 92.9 FM
- RDS: XHJH W RADIO
- Branding: W Radio

Programming
- Format: News/talk
- Affiliations: Radiópolis

Ownership
- Owner: Grupo Radio Cañón; (Radio Cañón, S.A. de C.V.)

History
- First air date: March 26, 1980 (concession)
- Former call signs: XEJH-AM
- Former frequencies: 1460 kHz

Technical information
- Licensing authority: CRT
- Class: B1
- ERP: 25,000 watts
- HAAT: 11.25 meters
- Transmitter coordinates: 19°35′40.45″N 96°58′28.46″W

Links
- Webcast: Listen live
- Website: radiocanon.com.mx

XHJH-FM is a radio station on 92.9 FM in Xalapa, Veracruz, Mexico. It is owned by Radio Cañón and carries the W Radio news/talk format from Radiópolis.

== History ==
XEJH-AM received its concession in 1980. It was owned by Luis Ignacio Santibañez Flores and broadcast on 1460 kHz. It migrated to FM in 2012.

Previous logo

In August 2021, the ABC Radio name was dropped after Organización Editorial Mexicana sold the group to NTR Medios de Comunicación. The station eventually became known as Radio Cañón, in line with other NTR stations.

On April 24, 2023, as part of a national alliance between the company and Radiópolis, 22 NTR-owned stations adopted franchise formats from Radiópolis, with XHJH-FM flipping to news/talk as part of the W Radio network.
