= XHMZO-FM =

Radio station in Manzanillo, Colima

- Manzanillo, Colima, Mexico; Mexico
- Broadcast area: Manzanillo, Colima
- Frequency: 92.9 FM
- Branding: Radio Turquesa

Programming
- Format: Pop

Ownership
- Owner: La Onda del Mar, S.A. de C.V.

History
- First air date: November 12, 1990
- Call sign meaning: ManZanillO

Technical information
- Class: C
- ERP: 50 kW

Links
- Website: turquesa.fm

XHMZO-FM is a radio station on 92.9 FM in Manzanillo, Colima, broadcasting from Cerro del Toro. The station is known as Radio Turquesa and carries a pop format.

== History ==
XHMZO received its concession on June 28, 1989, and has maintained the same concessionaire throughout. The station signed on November 12, 1990.
