= 1994 in radio =

List of years in radio	(table)
- … 1984; 1985; 1986; 1987; 1988; 1989; 1990; 1991; 1992; 1993; 1994; 1995; 1996; 1997; 1998; 1999; 2000; 2001; 2002; 2003; 2004 …
- In television 1991 1992 1993 1994 1995 1996 1997 In music 1991 1992 1993 1994 1995 1996 1997 In film 1991 1992 1993 1994 1995 1996 1997
- Art; Archaeology; Architecture; Literature; Music; Philosophy; Science; +...

The year 1994 in radio involved some significant events.

== Events ==
- January – WHTZ Z 100 Newark, NJ/New York City modifies their CHR format by mixing large amounts of Modern Rock into the format. They would continue this for over two years.
- January 11 – The Irish government announces the end of a 15-year broadcasting ban on the Provisional Irish Republican Army and its political arm Sinn Féin.
- February – In the United States:
  - WHYT Detroit evolves from Rhythmic CHR to CHR.
  - Radio station KVRE—Hot Springs Village, Arkansas, begins broadcasting.
- February 1 – Radio station at HM Prison Feltham in London begins broadcasting, origin of National Prison Radio in the United Kingdom.
- March – KFMH (99.7 FM) of Muscatine, Iowa, ceases its longtime progressive and alternative rock format on March 1. Two weeks later, the station's sale to New York-based Connoisseur Communications is completed; days later, the station's new country format debuts with call letters KBOB (to compete with the Quad City market's WLLR-FM).
- March 17 – KRJY/St. Louis flips from 1950s/1960s oldies to classic hits, branded as "K-HITS 96". They will later adopt the KIHT call letters.
- March 28 – After about a year of moving most of the station's personalities to then-sister KUDL and evolving their music, Kansas City's KMXV "Mix 93.3" officially drops its AC format to go CHR/Top-40, returning the format to a full-market signal. After KBEQ dropped the format a year earlier, the only option for CHR/Top-40 was 107.3 KXXR/KISF with a transmitter about 40 miles (64 km) from downtown KC. KISF would evolve to modern rock later in the year, with the shift completed in January 1995.
- April 15 – Roy Disney's Shamrock Broadcasting, which merged with Cleveland-based Malrite Communications Group's radio group in the previous year, spins off Cleveland stations WHK and WMMS to OmniAmerica, headed by former Malrite executives Carl Hirsch and Dean Thacker. WHK switches format to all-sports. WMMS' format moved to alternative rock, and the majority of the station's airstaff is replaced.
- April 26 – Antena 3, the third national channel of the Portuguese public radio begins its FM broadcast.
- June 25 – KXRX/Seattle drops its album rock format and begins stunting with comedy routines and an electronic countdown. On July 1, KXRX officially flips to Country as "Young Country 96.5".
- July 4 – WHYT/Detroit shifts to "Planet Jams", a hybrid Rhythmic CHR/modern rock format. The Rhythmic product will be phased out during the year, resulting in the complete shift to modern rock as "The Planet."
- July 9 – The final original American Top 40 airs in the U.S. The show continues internationally only for six months.
- September – In the United States:
  - WLUM/Milwaukee, Wisconsin drops its Rhythmic Contemporary format for Modern Rock as "New Rock 102ONE." The move left Milwaukee without a Top 40-based station until WXSS debuted in 1998.
  - Christian radio personality Harold Camping predicts three successive dates for the second coming of Jesus Christ.
- October 1 – WPAT-FM relaunches its Adult Contemporary format as more uptempo and now called Today's 93.1. WPAT 930 also simulcasts during the day during the week but runs leftover sports many evenings. WPAT FM drops all weekend specialty programs except for Sid Mark's Frank Sinatra show. The AM retains the other specialty programming and Sunday morning public affairs material.
- November – After eight-and-a-half years on the air, 105.5 KNAC in Long Beach, California, announces that they will be changing formats. The radio station eventually goes off the air three months later (on February 15, 1995), and is replaced by the Mexican music radio station KBUE (Que Buena).
- November 14 – During an interview with ABC Radio, ABC News anchor Peter Jennings causes an outcry from conservative commentators and viewers when he makes a statement comparing "angry voters" to two-year-olds with "uncontrollable rage" when asked about his views on the 1994 midterm elections. After petitions calling on ABC News to fire Jennings over these comments, and some asking that he be deported to Canada, Jennings apologizes for the statement.
- December 24 – First broadcast of Willem Lange's Favor Johnson: A Christmas Story on Vermont Public radio stations, repeated in subsequent years.

== Closings ==
- July 15 – AFN Berlin says farewell to the public with a 3-hour special broadcast, transmitted live into 54 countries.

== Deaths ==
- January 5 – Brian Johnston, 81, British cricket commentator and radio presenter
- January 23 – Brian Redhead, 64, British journalist and broadcaster
- February 1 – Olan Soule, 83, American radio and television actor
- April 22 – Richard Nixon, 81, American President who participated in the first presidential debate broadcast on the radio

== See also ==
- Radio broadcasting
