= XHYUC-FM =

IMER radio station in Mérida, Yucatán, Mexico

- Mérida, Yucatán; Mexico
- Frequency: 92.9 FM (HD Radio)
- Branding: Yucatán FM

Programming
- Format: Oldies music

Ownership
- Owner: Instituto Mexicano de la Radio

History
- First air date: 1990
- Former call signs: XHCPEM-FM (2023)
- Call sign meaning: "Yucatán"

Technical information
- Class: C1
- ERP: 100 kW
- HAAT: 74.3 m
- Transmitter coordinates: 20°58′23.6″N 89°38′32″W

Links
- Webcast: Listen live
- Website: imer.mx

XHYUC-FM is a radio station in Mérida, Yucatán, Mexico. Broadcasting on 92.9 FM, XHYUC-FM is owned by the Instituto Mexicano de la Radio and broadcasts an oldies music format under the name "Yucatán FM".

XHYUC-FM broadcasts in HD.

== History ==
XHYUC signed on in 1990 as "Radio Solidaridad", with a varied format emphasizing tropical music and appealing to different age groups. It signed on under an accord between IMER and the state government of Yucatán. This format was in use from 1990 to 2002 and again from 2004 to 2005. From 2002 to 2004, XHYUC was aimed at a younger demographic as "Estéreo 92.9", and since 2005, the station has broadcast older musical styles.

The concession for XHYUC-FM lapsed effective April 13, 2023, due to failure to file a timely renewal. The Federal Telecommunications Institute granted a new concession, which initially bore the template call sign XHCPEM-FM, which was changed back to XHYUC-FM along with those for five other stations whose concessions were lapsed and reawarded.
