= KYBR =

Coordinates: 36.098°N 106.122°W

- Espanola, New Mexico; United States
- Broadcast area: Santa Fe, New Mexico
- Frequency: 92.9 MHz
- Branding: Real Country 92.9

Programming
- Format: Classic Country

Ownership
- Owner: Rio Chama Broadcasting

History
- First air date: 1975
- Former call signs: KBSO (1975–1978); KBSQ (1978–1981); KEVR (1981–1990); KIOT (1990–1994)
- Former frequencies: 102.3 (1975–1994)
- Call sign meaning: Station branded as "The Bear"

Technical information
- Licensing authority: FCC
- Facility ID: 73118
- Class: C3
- ERP: 15,500 watts
- HAAT: 127 meters

Links
- Public license information: Public file; LMS
- Website: radiooso.com

KYBR (92.9 FM, "Real Country 92.9") is an American radio station licensed to Espanola, New Mexico, covering northern New Mexico including Santa Fe and Taos. It broadcasts a classic country music format and is owned by Rio Chama Broadcasting.

After experimenting with a Regional Mexican format, the station returned to a country format that combines older country hits with newer songs by traditional-sounding artists in July 2015.
