= KXES-LP =

- Galena, Alaska; United States
- Broadcast area: Metro Galena
- Frequency: 92.9 MHz

Programming
- Format: Variety

Ownership
- Owner: Yukon Wireless, Inc.

History
- First air date: 2003

Technical information
- Licensing authority: FCC
- Facility ID: 123974
- Class: LP1
- ERP: 100 watts
- HAAT: 8 meters (26 ft)
- Transmitter coordinates: 64°44′29.0″N 156°52′25.0″W

Links
- Public license information: LMS

KXES-LP is a Variety formatted broadcast radio station licensed to Galena, Alaska, serving Metro Galena. KXES is owned and operated by Yukon Wireless, Inc.
