= KKID =

- Salem, Missouri; United States
- Broadcast area: Salem, Missouri; Rolla, Missouri; Cuba, Missouri
- Frequency: 92.9 MHz

Programming
- Format: Classic rock

Ownership
- Owner: Brett Gromowski

History
- First air date: 1971
- Former call signs: KMMC, KSMO

Technical information
- Licensing authority: FCC
- Facility ID: 68742
- Class: C3
- ERP: 21,000 watts
- HAAT: 110 meters (360 ft)
- Transmitter coordinates: 37°43′46″N 91°28′25″W

Links
- Public license information: Public file; LMS

FCC license change

KKID is a radio station airing a classic rock format licensed to Salem, Missouri, broadcasting on 92.9 FM. The station is owned by Brett Gromowski.
