= KWYS (AM) =

- West Yellowstone, Montana; United States
- Frequency: 920 kHz
- Branding: 920 KWYS

Programming
- Format: Oldies/Classic hits

Ownership
- Owner: Radio West, LLC

History
- First air date: December 20, 1967

Technical information
- Licensing authority: FCC
- Facility ID: 24434
- Class: D
- Power: 1,000 watts (day); 38 watts (night)
- Transmitter coordinates: 44°38′56″N 111°05′50″W

Links
- Public license information: Public file; LMS

KWYS (920 AM) is a radio station licensed to serve West Yellowstone, Montana. The station is owned by Radio West, LLC. It airs an oldies/classic hits music format.

The stations studios are located at 303 Canyon Street, in West Yellowstone. The transmitter site is south of town, on Broadcast Trail Road, near the west gate to Yellowstone National Park.

The station was assigned the KWYS call letters by the Federal Communications Commission.

== Ownership ==
In March 2007, Denver-based Blue Point Media announced that it was set to merge with KWYS owner Chaparral Broadcasting Inc. Chaparral Broadcasting also owns four other radio stations in Wyoming as well as three stations in Idaho.

On March 25, 2009, an application was filed with the FCC to transfer control of KWYS (AM) from Chaparral to Radio West, LLC, which is controlled by Richard and Joyce Howe. This application was granted by the FCC, and the Howes now operate the station.

The current ownership report is located here.
