= Chubu-Nippon Broadcasting =

Radio and television station in Nagoya, Japan

Chubu-Nippon Broadcasting Co., Ltd.
- Logo used since 1982

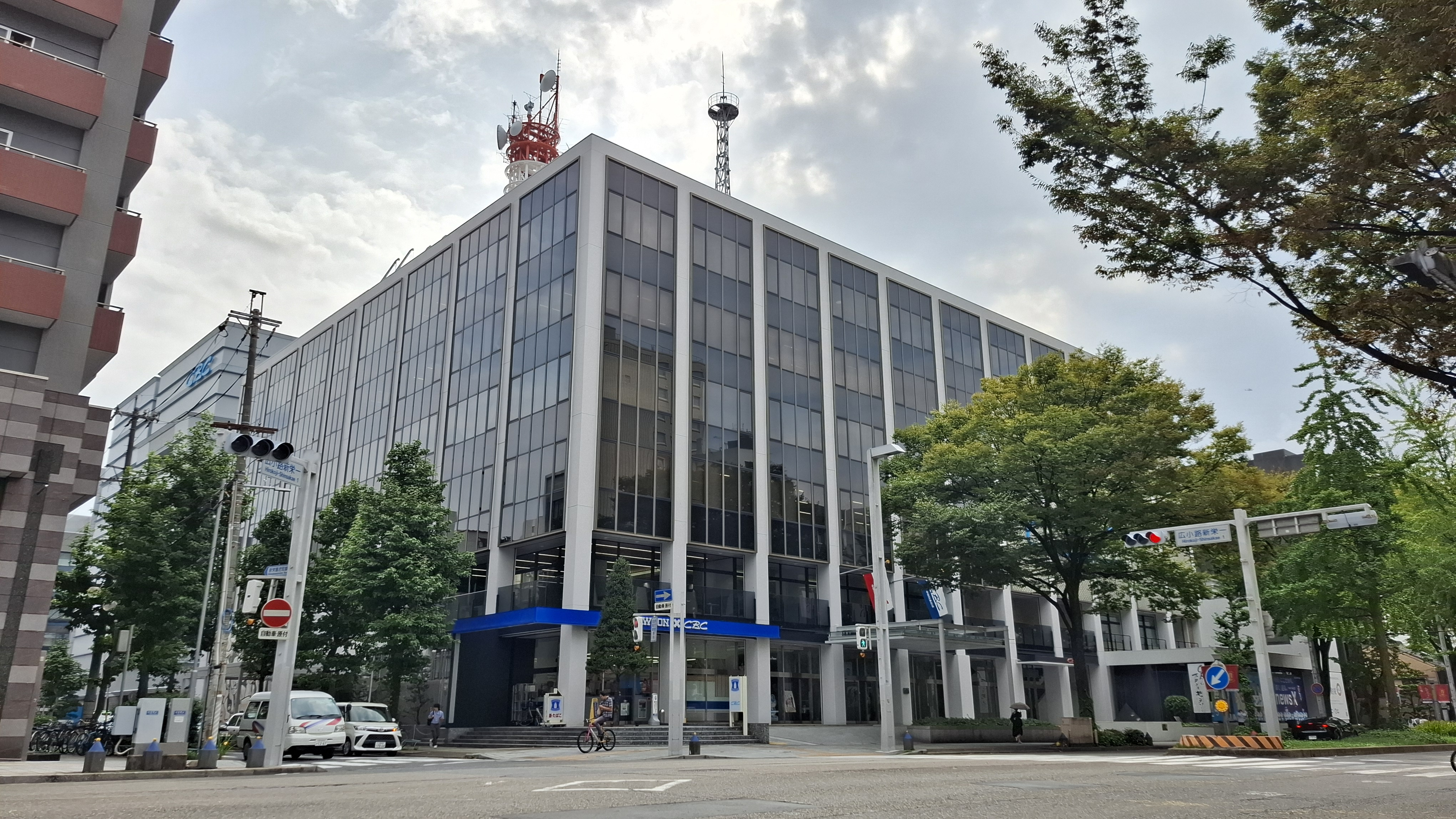
- Headquarters in Naka-ku, Nagoya
- Trade name: CBC
- Native name: 中部日本放送株式会社
- Type: Public company
- Traded as: NAG: 9402
- Industry: Media
- Founded: 15 December 1950; 75 years ago
- Headquarters: Naka-ku, Nagoya, Aichi Prefecture, Japan
- Key people: Masaki Sugiura (president and co-CEO); Seiji Misura (president and co-CEO)
- Subsidiaries: CBC Television; CBC Radio; CBC Creation; CBC Communications; CBC D Tech; CBC VIPS; Nanzan Country Club
- Website: hicbc.com/corporation/

JOAR
- Nagoya; Japan
- Broadcast area: Chūbu region
- Frequencies: 1053 kHz (AM); 93.7 MHz (FM)
- Branding: CBC Radio

Programming
- Language: Japanese
- Format: Talk/Sports
- Affiliations: JRN

Ownership
- Owner: CBC Radio Co., Ltd.

History
- First air date: 1 September 1951

Technical information
- Power: 50,000 watts

Links
- Website: hicbc.com/radio/

JOGX-DTV
- Chubu region; Japan
- City: Nagoya, Aichi Prefecture
- Channels: Digital: 18 (UHF); Virtual: 5
- Branding: CBC Television; CBC TV

Programming
- Language: Japanese
- Affiliations: Japan News Network

Ownership
- Owner: CBC Television Co., Ltd.

History
- First air date: 1 December 1956
- Former call signs: JOAR-TV (1956–2011); JOAR-DTV (2003–2013)
- Former channel numbers: Analog: 5 (VHF, 1956–2011)

Technical information
- Licensing authority: MIC
- Transmitter coordinates: 35°10′20.7″N 136°54′30″E

Links
- Website: hicbc.com/tv/

Chubu-Nippon Broadcasting Co., Ltd. (中部日本放送株式会社, Chūbu Nippon Hōsō kabushiki gaisha; CBC) is a regional radio and television group serving Nagoya, Aichi Prefecture, Japan. The Chunichi Shimbun is a major shareholder. Its radio service is affiliated with the Japan Radio Network (JRN) and its television service affiliated with TBS and the Japan News Network (JNN).

Founded in 1950, CBC is headquartered in the city of Nagoya.

== History ==
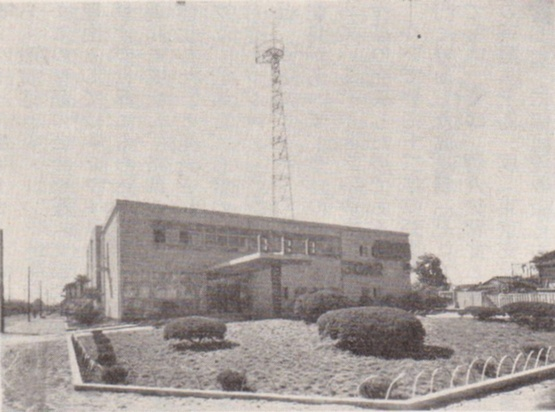
CBC's first headquarters, used from 1951 to 1956

Following the end of the Second World War, under active persuasion from Gensaku Kojima, then head of the newsroom liaisons office of the Chubu-Nippon Shimbun (now Chunichi Shimbun), Tsunejiro Tomiwa, interim president of the Aichi Chamber of Commerce and Industry, solicited a commercial radio license in 1946, but it was rejected by the General Headquarters. Plans were not resumed until 1950, with the promulgation of the Three Radio Laws, which enabled private stations to appear. Chubu-Nippon Broadcasting was established on 15 December 1950., with an initial capital of 80 million yen, headquarters in Shin-ei, Nagoya, and a 10-kilowatt transmitter. The first logo was selected through an open call, and the selected design was the work of Shojiro Shimazaki. On 21 April 1951, it obtained a license, and by virtue of being the first, it received the callsign JOAR.

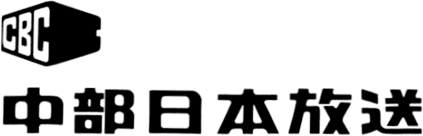
CBC's previous logo (used until 1973), designed by Shojiro Shimazaki

At 6:30am on September 1, 1951, Chubu-Nippon Broadcasting announcer Noboru Ui delivered the following announcement:

Chubu-Nippon Broadcasting, JOAR, broadcasting at 1090 kHz. Good morning everyone. This is CBC in Nagoya, Chubu-Nippon Broadcasting.

announcing both the official launch of CBC, and the beginning of private broadcasting in Japan. CBC achieved profitability in the first year of broadcasting, and implemented stock dividends and a capital increase of 40 million yen in the second year of broadcasting. Still in 1952, it became the first private broadcaster in Japan to establish its own labor union.

In July 1952, CBC decided to apply for a TV broadcast license, but it was denied because the application was submitted too late. In June 1954, the Nagoya TV Tower, jointly funded by CBC and NHK, was completed. In December of the same year, CBC obtained a TV broadcasting license. At 10am on December 1, 1956, CBC officially started broadcasting TV programs, becoming the third private TV station in Japan (the first two were Nippon Television and Radio Tokyo TV). In order to make more viewers interested in TV, CBC set up 30 street television sets within the broadcast range. According to a survey in 1958, the broadcasting unit of CBC accounted for 72.7% of the listening share in the Tokai area, and the TV unit accounted for 62% of the viewing share, which was far ahead of NHK. In 1959, the TV division of Chubu-Nippon Broadcasting joined the newly-launnched Japan News Network. Central Nippon Broadcasting Corporation used a helicopter to broadcast Ise Shrine Hatsune on New Year's Day of this year, the first of its kind in Japan. In the same year, CBC also participated in the broadcast of the wedding of Crown Prince Akihito (now the emperor emeritus) and Michiko Shoda. In September 1959, the Isewan typhoon caused serious disasters in the Tokai region. Chubu-Nippon Broadcasting Corporation used its own generator to continue broadcasting programs despite a power outage, and broadcast a large number of typhoon news, which was affirmed by the chairman of the Democratic Federation of Freedom.

In 1960, for its tenth anniversary (of founding), CBC donated a large fountain to Nagoya, installed at the Shirakawa Park; such fountain was complete in November 1962. CBC was listed at the Nagoya Stock Exchange on October 10, 1960. In 1962, CBC established its first overseas office in New York City. The first color transmission took place on September 1, 1964. In 1965, it joined the Japan Radio Network. That same year, it joined Video Research, and achieved the Triple Crown (prime time, whole evening, whole day) in ratings in 1965, 1966, 1970 and 1971.

A fire broke out at its facilities in 1969 and it took them eight months to repair the affected areas Its transmitter increased to 50 kilowatts in 1970, expanding its reach to a potential 14,68 million people. That same year, it applied a two-day weekend format for its schedule, Saturdays and Sundays. In 1973, CBC implemented its current logo concept, which became thicker in 1982. It also expanded its overseas businesses: in 1974, it became responsible for the newly-launched JNN bureau in Rome, and in 1975, it signed a sister station agreement with KTLA. From 1975 to 1980, it won the Triple Crown in ratings year after year. CBC was in charge of a Van Gogh exhibit at a local museum in 1977, held for its 25th anniversary; the exhibit alone attracted over 230,000 visitors, a record for a visit to an arts museum in Aichi Prefecture at the time. In 1978, it installed an ENG unit; stereo broadcasts began in 1979.

On November 20, 1987, it became the first TV station in Nagoya to begin 24-hour broadcasting. In 1989, an SNG unit was installed, as well as taking part in high definition television experiments using the Japanese Hi-Vision system. In 1990, it held numerous cultural events in observance of its fortieth anniversary, including a Mark Chakahl exhibit and a production of The Phantom of the Opera. That same year, CBC moved its European bureau from Rome to Vienna due to the situation in Eastern Europe; said bureau closed in 2010. In March 1997, it launched its official website.。

On June 20, 1999, CBC conducted its first digital terrestrial test transmission; this caused the company to set up a digital center in order to prepare for full broadcasts which began on December 1, 2003. During the 2005 Aichi Expo, it and the Chunichi Shimbun had a joint pavilion, Yumemiriyama, while CBC alone was responsible for the temporary FM station of the event. In April 2011, it opened a new JNN office in Los Angeles; the TV station ceased analog signals on July 24 of that year.

In 2013, the radio and television companies spun off into two separate wholly owned subsidiaries which were subsequently renamed as CBC Radio Co., Ltd. and CBC Television Co., Ltd. The TV subsidiary spun off in earnest in fiscal 2014 and changed its callsign from JOAR-DTV to JOGX-DTV. The radio station became available on Radiko in the early 2010s as the service gradually expanded to cover more stations. In 2020, it launched a local VOD service, Locipo, with Tokai Television, Chukyo Television and TV Aichi.
