= CBC Radio (Japan) =

Japanese radio station

JOAR

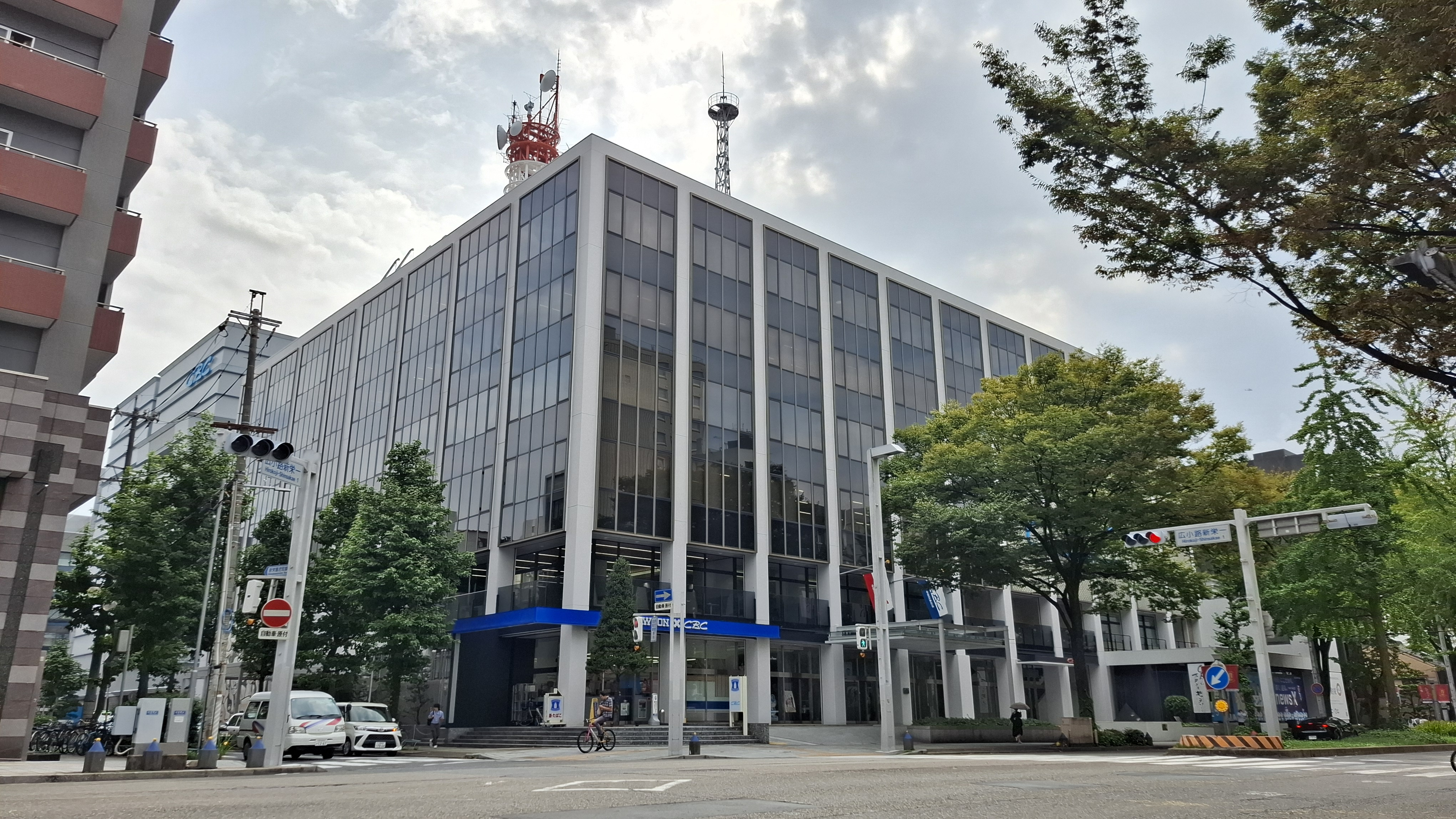
- Headquarters in Naka-ku, Nagoya
- Nagoya; Japan
- Broadcast area: Chubu region
- Frequencies: 1053 kHz (AM); 93.7 MHz (FM)
- Branding: CBC Radio

Programming
- Language: Japanese
- Format: Talk, Sports, News
- Affiliations: Japan Radio Network

Ownership
- Owner: CBC Radio Co., Ltd.

History
- First air date: September 1, 1951; 74 years ago

Technical information
- Licensing authority: MIC
- Power: 50kW

Links
- Website: https://hicbc.com/radio/

CBC Radio (CBCラジオ, CBC Rajio) is the radio subsidiary of Chubu-Nippon Broadcasting, operating as a radio broadcasting station for the Tōkai region (operating only on the Aichi-Mie-Gifu market). Established in 1950, and airing in 1951 as Japan's very-first commercial broadcasting company, it is located inside the CBC Broadcasting Hall in Nagoya, Japan. It is one of the core affiliates of the TBS Radio-led Japan Radio Network.

Since 2013, after 60 years of operating as a combined broadcasting company, the television and radio entities of Chubu-Nippon Broadcasting were spun-off. CBC Television relinquishes the call sign "JOAR-DTV" in a separation agreement with the Ministry of Communications, and currently uses the "JOGX-DTV" call sign. In 2011, CBC Radio, which was then called as "Technovision Co., Ltd.", then a subsidiary of CBC, changed its name to "CBC Radio Co., Ltd.", with its radio license transferred from CBC two years after. As of today, the "JOAR" call signs remain with CBC Radio.

In terms of affiliation, it is a core JRN full-network station,and also one of the 4 stations in the country to only be affiliated with the network. Other JRN-only affiliates are key-stations TBS Radio (Flagship) & RKB Radio, and non-core JRN station RBC iRadio.

== History ==
Chubu-Nippon Broadcasting started its radio service on September 1, 1951, after the company's establishment on December 15, 1950, as Japan's first-ever private broadcasting company. The program started with an announcement from CBC announcer, Noboru Ui: "This is Chubu Nippon Broadcasting, JOAR, broadcasting on a 1090 kilocycle channel. Good morning, everyone. This is Chubu Nippon Broadcasting, CBC, in Nagoya. On September 1, 1951, Chubu Nippon Broadcasting, Japan's first privately-owned broadcasting station, began broadcasting today." It aired different programs on its first broadcast, ranging from comedy, current affairs, performance arts, and more. When the Japan Radio Network was formed on May 2, 1965, CBC's radio service became an affiliate, owing to the company's membership to the "Five Company Alliance" with JRN/JNN flagship TBS, and key stations ABC (JNN affiliation is acquired by MBS when the 2 swapped affiliations in 1975, but the radio division of ABC remains a JRN affiliate.), RKB, and HBC.

In 1992, CBC Radio was put under CBC's subsidiary, "CBC Vision Co., Ltd.", which later became "Technovision Co., Ltd." in 2003. In 2011, the company now operates under its current name, which follows with the passing of the radio license from CBC in 2013, effectively splitting the television and radio businesses, and thus converting CBC into a broadcasting holdings company the following year.

In 2015, Complementary FM station operations started alongside rival Tokai Radio, where CBC Radio can be listened on its Wide FM frequency of 93.7MHz.

In 2018, due to interference from foreign signals, the Gifu relay (AM 639 kHz) was shut down. CBC advised its listeners in Gifu City, and surrounding areas to tune their dials to the Wide FM frequency, as the Mikuniyama Complementary FM also serves the wide Gifu area.

On January 9, 2024, CBC Radio filed for a preliminary license to establish its Toyohashi Complementary FM relay service with Tokai Radio, with a full license already in full swing in March 22nd. On March 25, 2024, afternoon programs of both stations were simultaneously aired live, signaling the start of the Toyohashi FM relay service. CBC Radio broadcasts in the area at 91.8MHz

== AM to FM transition ==
In 2021, in order to reduce costs in operating AM and FM stations (citing signal problems, aging AM transmitting equipment, and other factors), and also to improve or increase business efficiency and performance in terms of sales and advertisement, the Ministry of Communications announced that the transition from AM to FM will take place on 44 out of 47 prefectures, with a slow phasing out of AM master stations and relays starting in 2023, until the final phase of the transition to take place in fall 2028. This includes JRN's CBC Radio, and NRN affiliate Tokai Radio, as both stations serve the Aichi-Mie-Gifu market.

On the anniversary of the creation of Chubu-Nippon Broadcasting, which will fall on December 15, 2025, CBC Radio will implement an AM radio suspension in several areas in the Aichi-Mie-Gifu market, which includes Toyohashi (1485kHz), Nakatsugawa (1557kHz), and Owase (801kHz). At the time of this writing, it is still being planned, and after the AM suspension takes place on those areas, the main Nagoya AM frequency - 1053kHz, and the AM relays in Takayama (1557kHz), Kamioka (Hida) (1062kHz), and Kumano (720kHz) will be the only AM frequencies not included in the suspension announcement, and will continue to broadcast until further notice. CBC Radio listeners were encouraged by the station to listen to the main Mikuniyama FM frequency at 93.7MHz, & the Toyohashi FM relay at 91.8MHz. It also currently airs programs & podcasts on the Japanese online radio streaming platform, Radiko.

== Offices ==
Currently, CBC Radio operates on the following offices:

- Nagoya Head Office:1-2-8 Shinsakae, Naka-ku, Nagoya City, Aichi Prefecture
- Mikawa Branch: Okazaki Center Building 8F, 1-34 Myodaijihonmachi, Okazaki City, Aichi Prefecture
- Tokyo Branch: Chiyoda Kaikan 7F, 1-6-17 Kudan Minami, Chiyoda -ku, Tokyo
- Osaka Branch: Osaka Station Building 1, 7th floor, 1-3-1 Umeda, Kita-ku, Osaka City, Osaka Prefecture

== About the Tokyo Branch of CBC Radio ==
The Tokyo Branch of CBC Radio, which is housed at the Chiyoda Kaikan building, and managed by parent company, Chubu-Nippon Broadcasting, has facilities being used for program recordings, and in some cases, it can be used for live broadcasts through a direct line that is connected straight to the station's main headquarters in Nagoya. Also, it has dedicated lines to different radio stations across Tokyo, including JRN flagship TBS Radio, which can directly feed programs from CBC's Tokyo Offices over to CBC's Nagoya main broadcasting hub.

== Programming on CBC Radio ==
CBC Radio airs programming mainly from the Japan Radio Network as a full-network station, and one of JRN's key stations. They also produce their own local programming, and also airs other programming from other radio stations and production companies. Programs aired on the station include:

- BRAND NEW MORNING (TBS Radio)
- Ishizuka Motoaki Newsman!!!
- CBC Dragons Nighter - Live Baseball Coverage of the Chunichi Dragons. Currently airs during the baseball season, and is currently made in-house as JRN no longer airs NPB games since 2018. Most games of the league are currently aired by the NRN and its affiliates.
- Chiki Oginoue Session (TBS Radio)
- Chunichi Shimbun News - In cooperation with CBC's owners and majority shareholders, Chunichi Shimbun
- CBC Radio presents "RADIO MIKU"
- Sky presents Tatsuya Fujiwara's Radio (ABC Radio)
- CBC Radio #Plus! - Weekday morning program

== NRN Programming on CBC Radio ==
In some cases, CBC Radio, despite being a JRN-only affiliate, and one of the network's key stations, also airs some programming from rival network NRN, which cannot be aired by its Nagoya key station, Tokai Radio (SF). The main reason for this, in case of All Night Nippon, NRN's flagship late-night program series, is because of Tokai Radio airing its own blend of local late night programs, such as "Midnight Tokai", which started in 2000. Despite requests from its mother network to air it, Tokai Radio refused, as "Midnight Tokai" and its past and present local late night programming became popular to its listeners. Currently, Tokai Radio airs some of ANN's program series including "All Night Nippon MUSIC10", and "All Night Nippon Zero", which are airing before and after Tokai Radio's local late night offerings.

The flagship All Night Nippon program is currently aired on its regular timeslot by CBC Radio, as well as Audrey's All Night Nippon, which airs every Saturday night/Sunday early morning. Fellow JRN key station, RKB Radio also shares the same case, but unlike CBC Radio, which airs the flagship program, they only air the "SixTONES' All Night Nippon Saturday Special" every early Sunday morning at 12:00mn/24:00 JST, instead of key Fukuoka NRN station KBC Radio. KBC only airs the Saturday editions of All Night Nippon & All Night Nippon Zero at 1:00am/25:00JST & 3:00am/27:00 JST every Sunday morning respectively.

Other programs aired on CBC Radio that are from NRN include:

- Telephone Life Consultation (Jinsei Soudan) (JOLF/Nippon Broadcasting)
- Minna no Ongakushitsu (Everyone's Music Room) (JOQR/Nippon Cultural Broadcasting)

== Current Broadcasting Frequencies ==
CBC Radio (AM)
Master Station	Call sign	Frequency	Output	Remarks
Nagoya (Nagashima)	JOAR	1053 kHz	50kW	Transmitting station is located in Nagashima-cho, Kuwana City, Mie Prefecture. The current "JOAR" call sign has been with the radio station since its creation in 1951, and remained that way when the radio license was kept by the succeeding company, "CBC Radio Co., Ltd.". CBC Television relinquished the use of the "JOAR-DTV" callsign in 2013 in favor of "JOGX-DTV" as a part of a separation agreement between the company and the MIC as CBC becomes a holdings company a year later.
Relay Station	Call sign	Frequency	Output	Remarks
Toyohashi	JOAE (Discontinued)	1485 kHz	100W	These mentioned relays are currently inactive as part of CBC Radio's announcement to suspend AM relay operations in these areas since December 15, 2025, as a demonstration experiment to utilize the Wide FM capabilities of the station.
Ueno (Iga)		1485 kHz	100W	These mentioned relays are currently inactive as part of CBC Radio's announcement to suspend AM relay operations in these areas since December 15, 2025, as a demonstration experiment to utilize the Wide FM capabilities of the station.
Owase	JOAW (Abolished. Currently used by MegaNet affiliate, FM COCOLO.)	801 kHz	100W	These mentioned relays are currently inactive as part of CBC Radio's announcement to suspend AM relay operations in these areas since December 15, 2025, as a demonstration experiment to utilize the Wide FM capabilities of the station.
Takayama	JOAO (Discontinued)	1557 kHz	100W	
Nakatsugawa	JORO (Discontinued)	1557 kHz	100W	The call sign "JORO" was used by CBC's Nakatsugawa AM radio relay in 1964, but later abolished the use, which in turn, became the new call sign for Ryukyu Broadcasting's English radio service (then KSBK) after Okinawa was returned to Japan by the US, but didn't stayed that long as the English-only broadcast lasted for a year, eventually signing off in 1973 after the MIC refused or declined RBC to have the station's licensed renewed. RBC used the call sign again that same year, but this time, its for the station's Miyakojima relay. This lasted until 2005 when its AM relay is abolished, and replaced with an FM relay for the mentioned area.; Nakatsugawa's relay is one of 6 CBC AM Radio relays that are currently inactive as part of CBC Radio's announcement to suspend AM relay operations since December 15, 2025, as a demonstration experiment to utilize the Wide FM capabilities of the station.
Shinshiro		1557 kHz	100W	These mentioned relays are currently inactive as part of CBC Radio's announcement to suspend AM relay operations on these areas since December 15, 2025, as a demonstration experiment to utilize the Wide FM capabilities of the station.
Gero		1062 kHz	100W	These mentioned relays are currently inactive as part of CBC Radio's announcement to suspend AM relay operations on these areas since December 15, 2025, as a demonstration experiment to utilize the Wide FM capabilities of the station.
Kamioka (Hida)		1062 kHz	100W	
Kumano		720 kHz	100W	

Abolished Relays - Gifu (639 kHz, 500W) - Abolished in October 2018 due to nighttime interference, and the establishment of the Mount Mikuni (Mikuniyama) Wide FM station, making it possible to receive FM waves across the city of Gifu and surrounding areas.

CBC Radio (Wide FM/Complementary FM)
Station	Frequency	Output	Remarks
Nagoya (Broadcasting as Mikuniyama/Mount Mikuni FM Station)	93.7 MHz	7kW	Preliminary license for this station was issued on May 13, 2015, with regular broadcasting activities started on October 1st of the same year.
Toyohashi FM Station	91.8 MHz	50W	Preliminary license for this relay was issued on January 9, 2024, with regular broadcasting commencing on March 25 of the same year.
