= WZML-LP =

- Bryn Mawr, Pennsylvania; United States
- Broadcast area: Chester and Delaware County area
- Frequency: 92.9 MHz
- Branding: Where The Zenith of Music Lives

Programming
- Language: English
- Format: Alternative Freeform Vaporwave

Ownership
- Owner: The Inge Davidson Foundation

History
- First air date: August 29, 2016

Technical information
- Licensing authority: FCC
- Facility ID: 193177
- Class: L1
- ERP: 5 watts
- HAAT: 132 meters (433 ft)
- Transmitter coordinates: 40°05′17.00″N 75°28′49.20″W

Links
- Public license information: LMS
- Webcast: Listen live (via TuneIn)
- Website: www.instagram.com/wzml929

WZML-LP (92.9 FM) is a community radio station licensed to Bryn Mawr, Pennsylvania, and serves the Chester and Delaware County area. Its broadcast license is held by the Inge Davidson Foundation. It broadcasts a freeform radio format.

== History ==
This station received its original construction permit from the Federal Communications Commission on December 1, 2014. The new station was assigned the WZML-LP call sign by the FCC on December 10, 2014. The station received its license to cover from the FCC on August 29, 2016. The station also streams at tunein.com and on iTunes.

On November 23, 2021, WZML flipped to a classic alternative format with a new station manager taking over.

WZML's lineup features The Nighthawk, The Record Hop with Korey Oates, and Burial Ground. WZML's station manager hosts a show as well, though without an official show name.

WZML airs a vaporwave format overnight called "Vaporwave Overnight".
