= KEZQ =

- West Yellowstone, Montana; United States
- Broadcast area: Jackson Hole, Wyoming
- Frequency: 92.9 MHz
- Branding: The Big EZ

Programming
- Format: Soft adult contemporary

Ownership
- Owner: Scott Anderson; (Jackson Hole Radio, LLC)

History
- First air date: June 1, 1996
- Former call signs: KWWF (1995–1998)

Technical information
- Licensing authority: FCC
- Facility ID: 23306
- Class: C
- ERP: 46,000 watts
- HAAT: 833 meters (2733 feet)
- Transmitter coordinates: 44°33′41″N 111°26′32″W

Links
- Public license information: Public file; LMS

KEZQ (92.9 FM, "The Big EZ") is a radio station licensed to serve West Yellowstone, Montana. The station is owned by Scott Anderson, through licensee Jackson Hole Radio, LLC. It airs a soft adult contemporary music format.

The station was assigned the KEZQ call sign by the U.S. Federal Communications Commission (FCC) on November 30, 1998.

== Ownership ==
In March 2007, Denver-based Blue Point Media announced that it was set to merge with KEZQ owner Chaparral Broadcasting Inc. Chaparral Broadcasting also owns four radio stations in Wyoming as well as three stations in Idaho.

Effective May 3, 2022, Chaparral Broadcasting sold KEZQ to Scott Anderson's Jackson Hole Radio, LLC for $150,000.

== Station silent ==
In January 2008, the station temporarily went off the air. In their filing with the FCC, station management stated, "Station KEZQ'S antenna was damaged by an ice storm. Due to the remote location of the station's transmitter site, the antenna cannot be repaired/replaced until Spring."

On July 18, 2008, the station owner filed the first of a series of requests to extend the existing STA order. The station's current stay-silent authorization is scheduled to expire on April 22, 2011.

== Construction permit ==
KEZQ was granted an FCC construction permit on March 12, 2009, to change the city of license to Iona, Idaho, west of Idaho Falls. The frequency is changed to 93.1, ERP is decreased to 37,000 watts and HAAT is decreased to 440 meters. The construction permit expired on March 12, 2012.
