= WVHL =

- Farmville, Virginia; United States
- Broadcast area: Southside
- Frequency: 92.9 MHz
- Branding: Kickin' Country 92.9

Programming
- Format: Country
- Affiliations: ABC News Radio; Premiere Networks; Westwood One; Longwood Lancers

Ownership
- Owner: North Street Enterprise, Inc.

History
- First air date: September 23, 1996
- Call sign meaning: W Virginia's Heart Land

Technical information
- Licensing authority: FCC
- Facility ID: 76337
- Class: A
- Power: 6,000 watts
- HAAT: 100 meters (330 ft)
- Transmitter coordinates: 37°17′6.0″N 78°29′39.0″W

Links
- Public license information: Public file; LMS
- Webcast: Listen Live
- Website: wvhl.net

WVHL (92.9 MHz) is a country formatted broadcast radio station licensed to Farmville, Virginia, serving the Southside. WVHL is owned and operated by North Street Enterprise, Inc.

Additionally, WVHL is the primary radio broadcaster for College Football, Basketball, Baseball for Hampden Sydney College.
