= WDUP-LP =

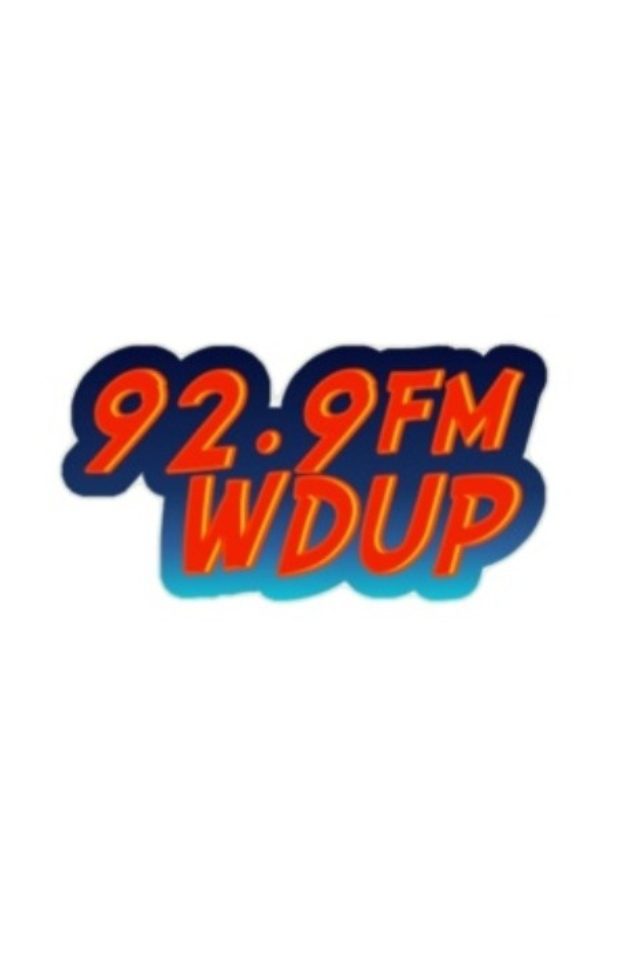
- New London, Connecticut; United States
- Frequency: 92.9 MHz
- Branding: 92.9 WDUP

Programming
- Format: hip-hop; R&B

Ownership
- Owner: HP-NL Communications, Inc.

History
- First air date: August 2014

Technical information
- Licensing authority: FCC
- Facility ID: 194354
- Class: L1
- ERP: 100 watts
- HAAT: −4.8 meters (−16 ft)
- Transmitter coordinates: 41°21′2.73″N 72°5′56.72″W

Links
- Public license information: LMS
- Website: 929wdup.com

WDUP-LP (92.9 FM) is a hip-hop and R&B formatted radio station that plays a variety of hip hop and R&B music from different eras. The station is licensed to serve the New London, Connecticut area, and is owned by HP-NL Communications, Inc.
