= KMXQ =

- Socorro, New Mexico; United States
- Frequency: 92.9 MHz

Programming
- Format: Classic rock

Ownership
- Owner: Cochise Media Licenses LLC

History
- First air date: January 22, 1995

Technical information
- Licensing authority: FCC
- Facility ID: 72615
- Class: A
- ERP: 137 watts
- HAAT: −54 meters (−177 ft)
- Transmitter coordinates: 34°2′43″N 106°54′21″W

Links
- Public license information: Public file; LMS

KMXQ (92.9 FM) is a radio station broadcasting a classic rock music format. Licensed to Socorro, New Mexico, United States, the station is currently owned by Cochise Media Licenses LLC.
