= WSKL =

Coordinates: 40°08′46″N 87°27′15″W

- Veedersburg, Indiana; United States
- Broadcast area: Danville, Illinois
- Frequency: 92.9 MHz
- Branding: Kool 92.9

Programming
- Format: Oldies

Ownership
- Owner: Zona Communications, Inc.

History
- First air date: 1999
- Former call signs: WKLO (1996–1999); WARL (2/1999-6/1999)

Technical information
- Licensing authority: FCC
- Facility ID: 69850
- Class: A
- ERP: 4,500 watts
- HAAT: 82 meters (269 ft)

Links
- Public license information: Public file; LMS
- Webcast: Listen Live
- Website: koololdies.net

WSKL 92.9 FM is a radio station broadcasting an oldies format. Licensed to Veedersburg, Indiana, the station serves the areas of Danville, Illinois and Attica, Indiana, and is owned by Zona Communications, Inc.
