= West Yellowstone, Montana =

West Yellowstone
- Town
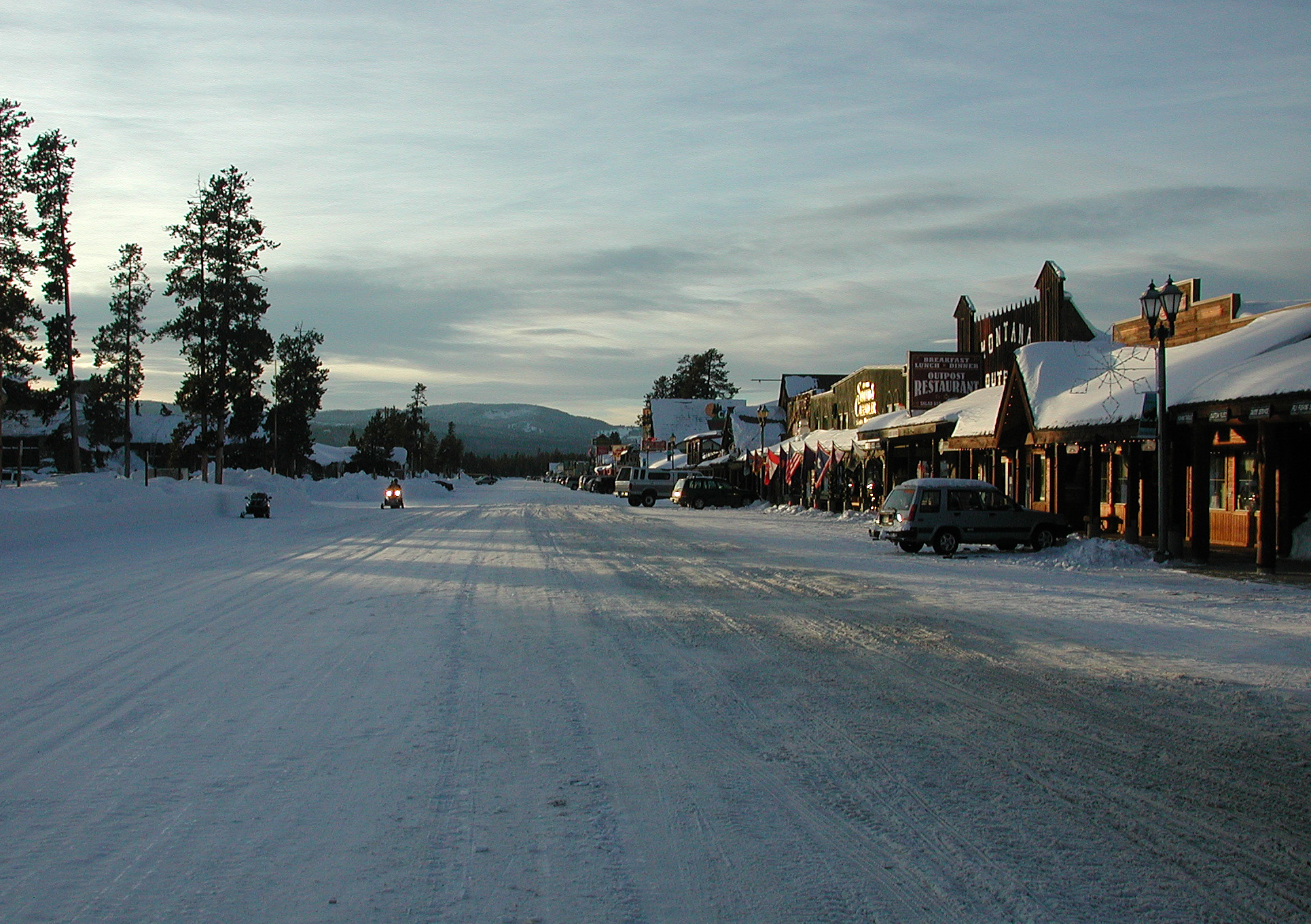
- Yellowstone Avenue in winter

- Seal

- Location of West Yellowstone within Gallatin County
- Coordinates: 44°39′44″N 111°06′25″W
- Country: United States
- State: Montana
- County: Gallatin
- First Settled: November 12, 1907
- Incorporated: June 6, 1966
- Founder: E.H. Harriman
- Named for: Yellowstone National Park

Area
  - Total: 0.91 sq mi (2.35 km^{2})
  - Land: 0.91 sq mi (2.35 km^{2})
  - Water: 0 sq mi (0.00 km^{2})
- Elevation: 6,667 ft (2,032 m)

Population (2020)
  - Total: 1,272
  - Density: 1,401/sq mi (541.1/km^{2})
- Time zone: UTC-7 (Mountain)
  - Summer (DST): UTC-6 (Mountain)
- ZIP Code: 59758
- Area code: 406
- FIPS code: 30-79525
- GNIS ID: 2413469
- Website: www.westyellowstone.gov

West Yellowstone is a town in Gallatin County, Montana, United States, adjacent to Yellowstone National Park. The population was 1,272 at the 2020 census. West Yellowstone is served by Yellowstone Airport. It is part of the Bozeman, MT Micropolitan Statistical Area.

West Yellowstone offers lodging, gift shops, and other services to travelers visiting nearby Yellowstone National Park.

== History ==
Founded in June 1908 when the Oregon Short Line Railroad was completed, the town's name changed several times until West Yellowstone was settled upon in 1920. Train service to West Yellowstone ended in 1960. The town was incorporated in 1966.

== Geography ==
According to the United States Census Bureau, the town has a total area of 0.80 square miles (2.07 km^{2}), all land. West Yellowstone is 5 miles west from Yellowstone National Park

=== Climate ===
At 6,660 feet (2,030 m) above sea level and nearly halfway between the equator and the North Pole, West Yellowstone experiences a subalpine climate (Köppen Dfc), with cold — sometimes bitterly cold — winters and brief but generally warm summers. West Yellowstone is snow-covered from the beginning of November until the beginning of May. At the peak of the snowpack, which typically occurs in early March, there is 3.5 to 4 feet or 1.1 to 1.2 meters of snow on the ground. In 2007–2008, West Yellowstone had snow on the ground from late October until mid May, with 4.5 feet or 1.4 meters of snow by late March. During the summer, the average low is 41 °F (5 °C), and the average high is 78 °F (25.6 °C). During the coldest month, January, the average low is 0 °F (−17.8 °C), and the average high is 24 °F or −4.4 °C.

West Yellowstone holds the all-time lowest recorded temperature for any residential community in the contiguous United States at −66 °F or −54.4 °C, although a lower temperature was once recorded at Rogers Pass, Montana, at −70 °F or −56.7 °C.

Climate data for West Yellowstone, Montana 1991–2020 normals, extremes 1924–present: 6,679 feet or 2,036 meters
Month	Jan	Feb	Mar	Apr	May	Jun	Jul	Aug	Sep	Oct	Nov	Dec	Year
Record high °F (°C)	49 (9)	56 (13)	62 (17)	76 (24)	88 (31)	93 (34)	99 (37)	96 (36)	91 (33)	83 (28)	64 (18)	54 (12)	99 (37)
Mean maximum °F (°C)	37.6 (3.1)	42.6 (5.9)	54.3 (12.4)	65.3 (18.5)	75.6 (24.2)	83.8 (28.8)	87.9 (31.1)	88.4 (31.3)	82.8 (28.2)	69.1 (20.6)	49.3 (9.6)	37.3 (2.9)	90.0 (32.2)
Mean daily maximum °F (°C)	26.8 (−2.9)	31.2 (−0.4)	39.7 (4.3)	47.7 (8.7)	59.2 (15.1)	68.4 (20.2)	79.7 (26.5)	77.9 (25.5)	67.6 (19.8)	50.8 (10.4)	35.9 (2.2)	25.8 (−3.4)	50.9 (10.5)
Daily mean °F (°C)	13.5 (−10.3)	16.4 (−8.7)	24.4 (−4.2)	34.2 (1.2)	43.9 (6.6)	51.2 (10.7)	59.4 (15.2)	57.0 (13.9)	48.6 (9.2)	36.1 (2.3)	23.6 (−4.7)	14.2 (−9.9)	35.2 (1.8)
Mean daily minimum °F (°C)	0.2 (−17.7)	1.5 (−16.9)	9.1 (−12.7)	20.7 (−6.3)	28.5 (−1.9)	33.9 (1.1)	39.2 (4.0)	36.2 (2.3)	29.6 (−1.3)	21.4 (−5.9)	11.4 (−11.4)	2.7 (−16.3)	19.5 (−6.9)
Mean minimum °F (°C)	−29.4 (−34.1)	−29.6 (−34.2)	−13.4 (−25.2)	4.7 (−15.2)	17.1 (−8.3)	24.9 (−3.9)	28.1 (−2.2)	26.3 (−3.2)	18.8 (−7.3)	5.2 (−14.9)	−16.8 (−27.1)	−27.5 (−33.1)	−36.6 (−38.1)
Record low °F (°C)	−60 (−51)	−66 (−54)	−43 (−42)	−26 (−32)	0 (−18)	16 (−9)	20 (−7)	15 (−9)	−9 (−23)	−22 (−30)	−38 (−39)	−59 (−51)	−66 (−54)
Average precipitation inches (mm)	2.28 (58)	2.06 (52)	2.17 (55)	2.31 (59)	2.70 (69)	2.49 (63)	1.30 (33)	1.39 (35)	1.69 (43)	1.92 (49)	2.61 (66)	3.05 (77)	25.97 (659)
Source 1: NOAA
Source 2: XMACIS2

== Demographics ==
Historical population
Census	Pop.	Note	%±
1930	200		—
1940	300		50.0%
1950	400		33.3%
1960	500		25.0%
1970	756		51.2%
1980	735		−2.8%
1990	913		24.2%
2000	1,177		28.9%
2010	1,271		8.0%
2020	1,272		0.1%
source: U.S. Decennial Census

West Yellowstone town, Montana – Racial composition Note: the US Census treats Hispanic/Latino as an ethnic category. This table excludes Latinos from the racial categories and assigns them to a separate category. Hispanics/Latinos may be of any race.
Race (NH = Non-Hispanic)	% 2020	% 2010	% 2000	Pop 2020	Pop 2010	Pop 2000
White alone (NH)	71.1%	77.4%	89%	904	984	1,048
Black alone (NH)	1.1%	0.4%	0.3%	14	5	4
American Indian alone (NH)	0.1%	0.6%	0.8%	1	7	9
Asian alone (NH)	1.6%	0.9%	0.7%	20	11	8
Pacific Islander alone (NH)	0.1%	0%	0%	1	0	0
Other race alone (NH)	0.6%	0.1%	0.3%	7	1	4
Multiracial (NH)	4.5%	2.8%	1.1%	57	35	13
Hispanic/Latino (any race)	21.1%	17.9%	7.7%	268	228	91

The most reported ancestries in 2020 were:

- Mexican (20.4%)
- German (17.1%)
- English (15.3%)
- Irish (12.6%)
- French (3.8%)
- Italian (3.5%)
- Scottish (2.8%)
- Polish (2.6%)
- Welsh (2.3%)
- Swedish (2%)
- Nansemond Indian Nation (1.7%)

=== 2010 census ===
As of the census of 2010, there were 1,271 people, 617 households, and 298 families residing in the town. The population density was 1,588.8 inhabitants per square mile (613.4/km^{2}). There were 969 housing units at an average density of 1,211.3 per square mile (467.7/km^{2}). The racial makeup of the town was 86.6% White, 0.4% African American, 1.1% Native American, 0.9% Asian, 7.5% from other races, and 3.5% from two or more races. Hispanic or Latino people of any race were 17.9% of the population.

There were 617 households, of which 23.7% had children under the age of 18 living with them, 34.7% were married couples living together, 8.4% had a female householder with no husband present, 5.2% had a male householder with no wife present, and 51.7% were non-families. 42.1% of all households were made up of individuals, and 5.8% had someone living alone who was 65 years of age or older. The average household size was 2.06, and the average family size was 2.86.

The median age in the town was 39.4 years. 20.9% of residents were under the age of 18; 6.5% were between the ages of 18 and 24; 30.1% were from 25 to 44; 34.2% were from 45 to 64; and 8.4% were 65 years of age or older. The gender makeup of the town was 53.1% male and 46.9% female.

=== 2000 census ===
As of the census of 2000, there were 1,177 people, 518 households, and 289 families residing in the town. The population density was 1,458.9 inhabitants per square mile (563.3/km^{2}). There were 806 housing units at an average density of 999.0 per square mile (385.7/km^{2}). The racial makeup of the town was 91.93% White, 0.34% African American, 0.85% Native American, 0.76% Asian, 4.84% from other races, and 1.27% from two or more races. Hispanic or Latino people of any race were 7.73% of the population.

There were 518 households, out of which 26.8% had children under the age of 18 living with them, 42.9% were married couples living together, 8.9% had a female householder with no husband present, and 44.2% were non-families. 34.4% of all households were made up of individuals, and 2.5% had someone living alone who was 65 years of age or older. The average household size was 2.15 and the average family size was 2.76.

In the town, the population was spread out, with 22.4% under the age of 18, 7.9% from 18 to 24, 35.9% from 25 to 44, 28.5% from 45 to 64, and 5.3% who were 65 years of age or older. The median age was 37 years. For every 100 females there were 123.3 males. For every 100 females age 18 and over, there were 121.1 males.

The median income for a household in the town was $30,703, and the median income for a family was $37,250. Males had a median income of $24,297 versus $20,909 for females. The per capita income for the town was $19,136. About 9.1% of families and 12.9% of the population were below the poverty line, including 18.2% of those under age 18 and 5.1% of those age 65 or over.

== Economy ==
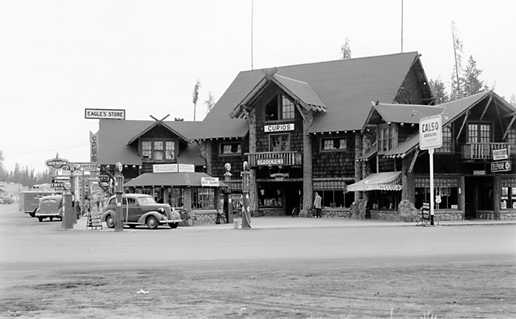
Eagle's store in West Yellowstone, 1939

=== Tourism ===
Because of its proximity to Yellowstone National Park, the town receives a large amount of tourism, especially from China. To cater to these tourists, the town has commercial signage in Mandarin as well as six Chinese restaurants. It is estimated to receive more than half its annual business from Chinese tourists.

== Education ==
The town is in the West Yellowstone K-12 school district.

The town has one school, the West Yellowstone School, serving kindergarten through 12th grade. West Yellowstone High School is a class C school (fewer than 108 students) which helps determine athletic competitions. They are known as the Wolverines.

West Yellowstone Public Library serves the area.

== Media ==
Three radio stations are licensed in West Yellowstone. KWYS (AM), broadcasting at 920 kHz and locally owned by Radio West, LLC, plays an oldies format. The FM station KEZQ plays soft adult contemporary music. KPWY is a religious radio station.

== Infrastructure ==
=== Layout ===
The D Parkway road roughly separates the town into residential and commercial areas. South of D Parkway is mainly a business/commercial area, while northward is a residential area of homes and apartments. The area north of D Parkway is known to locals as the "Madison Addition".

=== Transportation ===
The West Yellowstone Airport, a mainly summer-operating airport, is to the north of town.

U.S. Route 20 and U.S. Route 191 pass through the town.

The Union Pacific Railroad historically operated the Butte Special (29/30), which linked with a coordinated train, the Yellowstone Special (35/36), which ran from Pocatello, Idaho to West Yellowstone. The two trains ran linked from Pocatello to Idaho Falls, where the latter train split off for West Yellowstone. Service ended in 1971.

=== Medical services ===
As of 1972 the community has its own ambulance, and the nearest medical centers were in Ashton, Idaho and Bozeman, Montana, 60 miles (97 km) and 90 miles (140 km) away, respectively.

== See also ==
- Angling in Yellowstone National Park
