= KQRP-LP =

- Malakoff, Texas; United States
- Broadcast area: Western Henderson County/Cedar Creek Lake
- Frequency: 92.9 MHz

Programming
- Format: Spanish Christian

Ownership
- Owner: Cedar Creek Educational Broadcasting Corporation

History
- Call sign meaning: KQRP (QRP operation refers to transmitting at reduced power while attempting to maximize one's effective range)

Technical information
- Licensing authority: FCC
- Facility ID: 192154
- Class: L1
- ERP: 100 watts
- HAAT: 29 meters (95 ft)
- Transmitter coordinates: 32°13′31″N 96°0′59″W

Links
- Public license information: LMS

KQRP-LP (92.9 FM) is a radio station broadcasting a 24-hour Spanish Christian format, licensed to Malakoff, Texas, United States. The station serves Cedar Creek Lake and the western side of Henderson County.
