= Yellowstone Airport =

Airport in Montana, United States

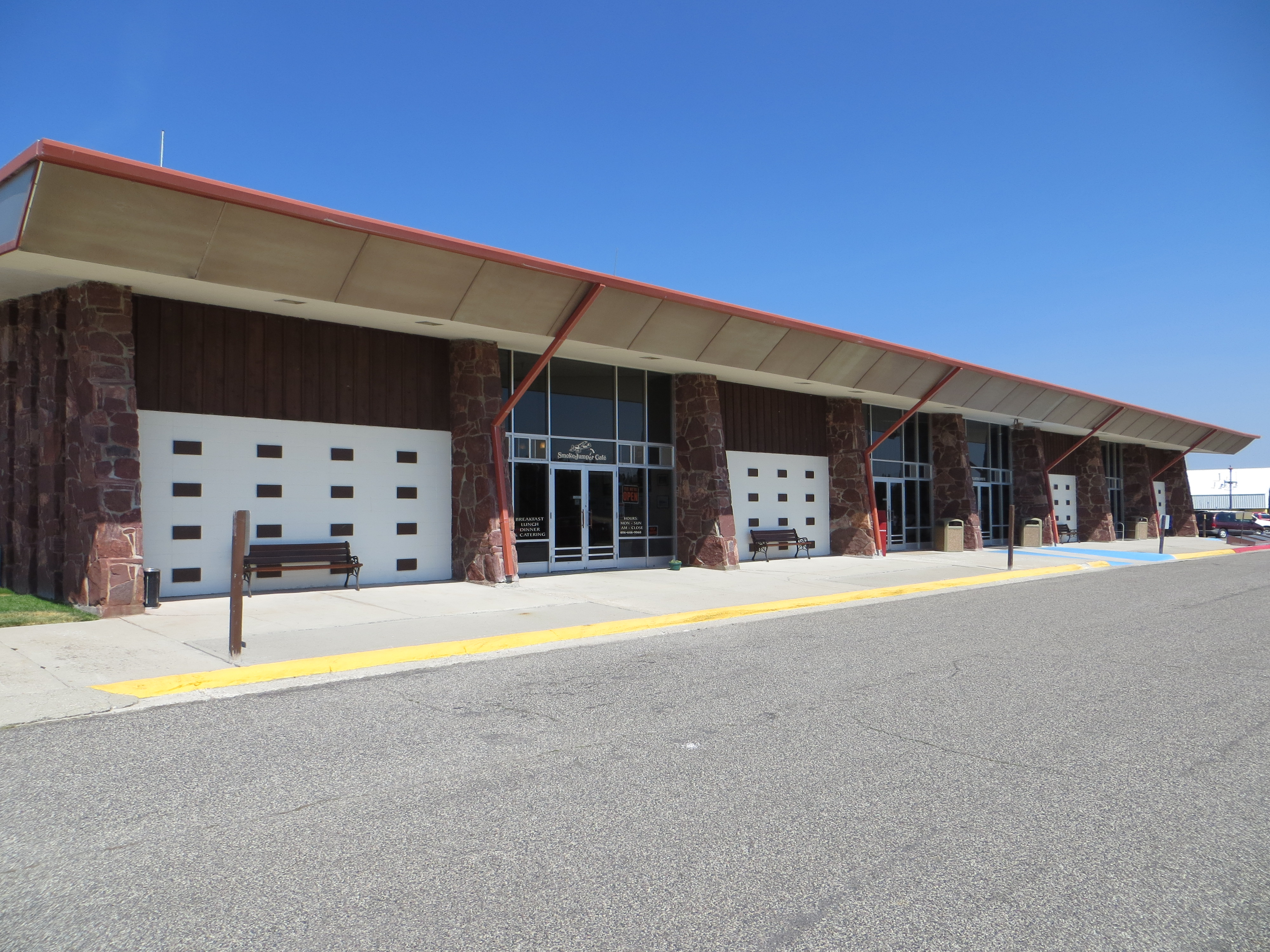
- IATA: WYS; ICAO: KWYS; FAA LID: WYS

Summary
- Airport type: Public
- Owner: State of Montana
- Serves: West Yellowstone, Montana
- Elevation AMSL: 6,649 ft (2,027 m)
- Coordinates: 44°41′18″N 111°07′04″W
- Website: yellowstoneairport.mdt.mt.gov

Map
- Location of airport in Montana WYS (the United States)

Runways
Direction	Length		Surface
Direction	ft	m	Surface
1/19	8,400	2,560	Asphalt

Statistics (2018)
- Aircraft operations: 11,105
- Source: Federal Aviation Administration

Yellowstone Airport (IATA: WYS, ICAO: KWYS, FAA LID: WYS) is a state-owned public-use airport in unincorporated Gallatin County, Montana, United States, located adjacent to U.S. 191/U.S. 287 1 nautical mile (1.9 km) north of the central business district of West Yellowstone. Although only open from June through September, commercial passenger service is available during those months. Scheduled airline service is subsidized by the federal Essential Air Service (EAS) program.

As per Federal Aviation Administration records, the airport had 4,186 passenger boardings (enplanements) in calendar year 2008, 4,331 enplanements in 2009, and 4,451 in 2010. It is included in the National Plan of Integrated Airport Systems for 2011–2015, which categorized it as a non-primary commercial service airport (between 2,500 and 10,000 enplanements per year).

The town of West Yellowstone is located near the west entrance to Yellowstone National Park. The airport should not be confused with Yellowstone Regional Airport in Cody, Wyoming or Yellowstone International Airport between Belgrade and Bozeman, Montana, which are 104 miles (167 km) and 88 miles (144 km), respectively, from this airport and about 53 miles (85 km) from the east entrance of Yellowstone National Park (Yellowstone Regional) and about 88 miles (142 km) from the north entrance or west entrance (Yellowstone International). In the past, the Official Airline Guide (OAG) referred to the Yellowstone Airport in its scheduled airline flight listings as West Yellowstone Airport (WYS).

== Historical airline service ==
Western Airlines began the first service to West Yellowstone in the late 1930's. Service was seasonal in nature and was not operated during the winter months. West Yellowstone was served with Douglas DC-3's and was one of many stops on a route between Los Angeles, California and Great Falls, Montana. Western's service was suspended through the 1950's and returned in the mid-1960s, again on a seasonal basis but now using Lockheed L-188 Electra propjets. In 1965, Western claimed in a print advertisement that it was the only air carrier serving the airport which had been rebuilt and expanded into "a brand new, jet-age airport - right at Yellowstone Park". The airline then replaced this turboprop service with Boeing 737-200 jet flights by 1970. During the summer of 1973, Western was operating four 737 flights a day into the airport with nonstop jet service to Butte, MT; Great Falls; MT, Idaho Falls, ID; and Salt Lake City; as well as flying direct, no change of plane jet service to Las Vegas; Ontario, CA; San Diego; and San Francisco. Western's service ended after the summer of 1980 but the airline returned for one more season in the summer of 1983 flying a Boeing 727-200 on a nonstop flight to Salt Lake City.

The original Frontier Airlines (1950-1986) began serving the airport in 1967 with summer seasonal service operating direct flights to Denver using Convair 580 turboprop aircraft. In 1981 Frontier upgraded its service to Boeing 737-200 jetliners to Denver which were also flown from June through September of each year until service ended after the summer 1985 season.

According to the Official Airline Guide (OAG), Aspen Airways began serving the airport on a seasonal basis in June 1982 with daily nonstop service from Salt Lake City operated with Convair 580 turboprops.

SkyWest Airlines took over the service to West Yellowstone beginning with the summer 1986 travel season operating flights to Salt Lake City. The first summer was operated as Western Express, using a code-share affiliation with Western Airlines. Western was subsequently acquired by Delta Air Lines, which then turned the former Western service at the airport over to regional airline affiliate Delta Connection operated by SkyWest Airlines. This Delta Connection service to Salt Lake City began with the summer 1987 season and continues today. Service was initially flown with Embraer EMB 120 Brasilia turboprop aircraft and was upgraded with Bombardier CRJ-200 regional jets in 2015 and to CRJ-900's in 2024. New nonstop service to Denver was added back, beginning with the summer 2021 season, operating as United Express in affiliation with United Airlines. This service is operated with one flight per day except on Saturday, with two flights. This flight is operated by SkyWest with CRJ-200 regional jets.

== Facilities and aircraft ==
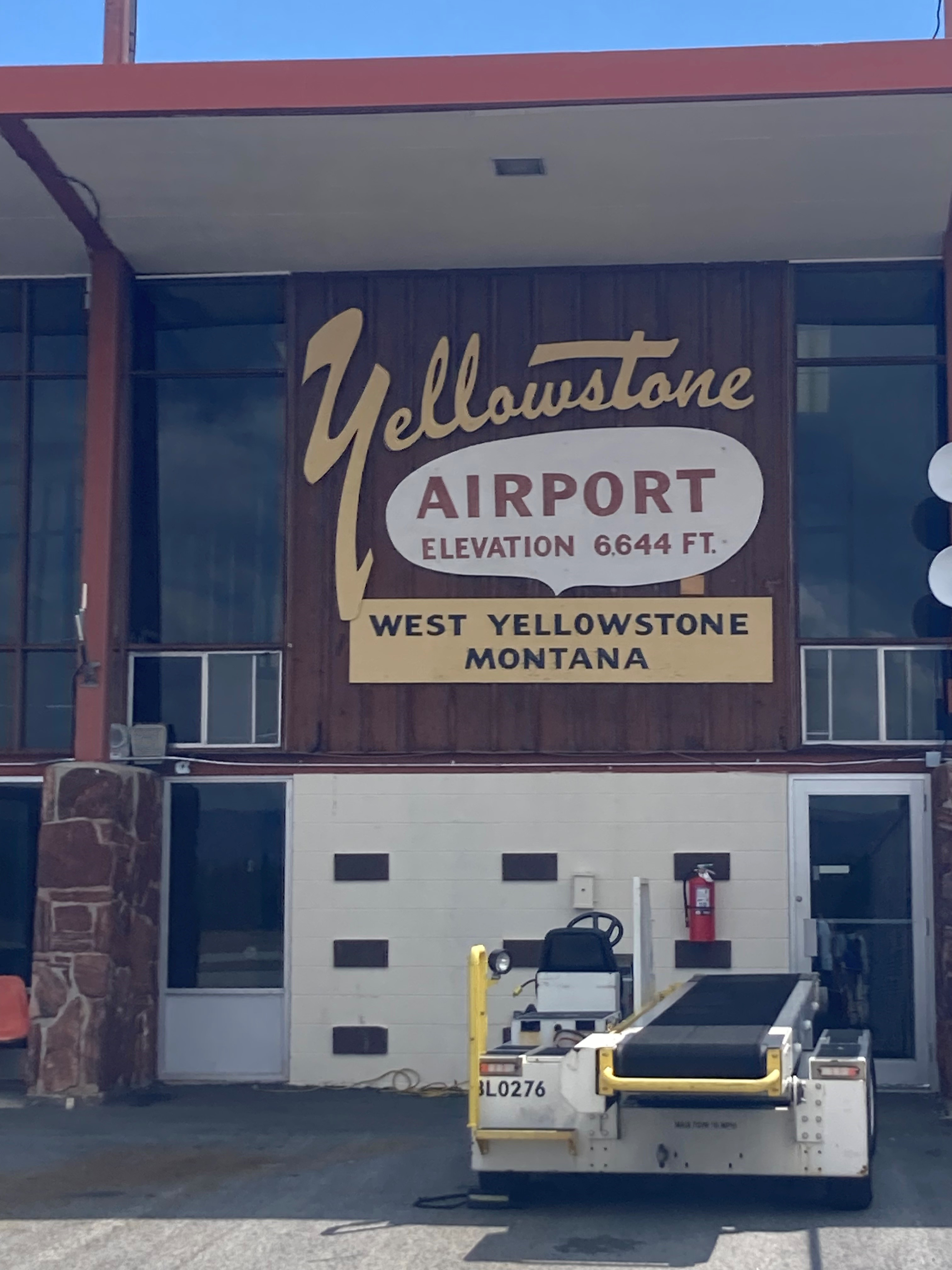
WYS airport taken from the tarmac and plane loading/unloading area

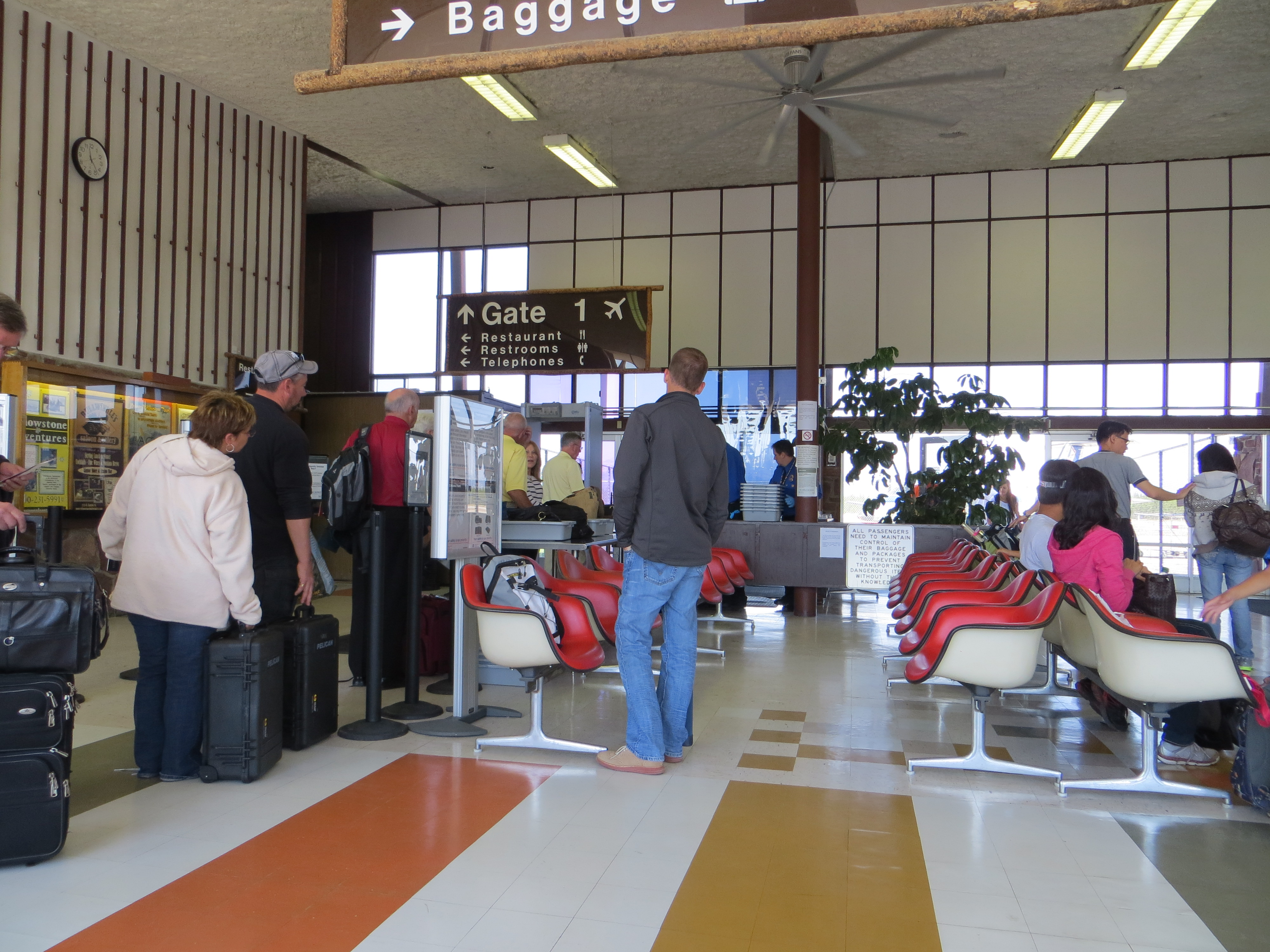
Waiting area

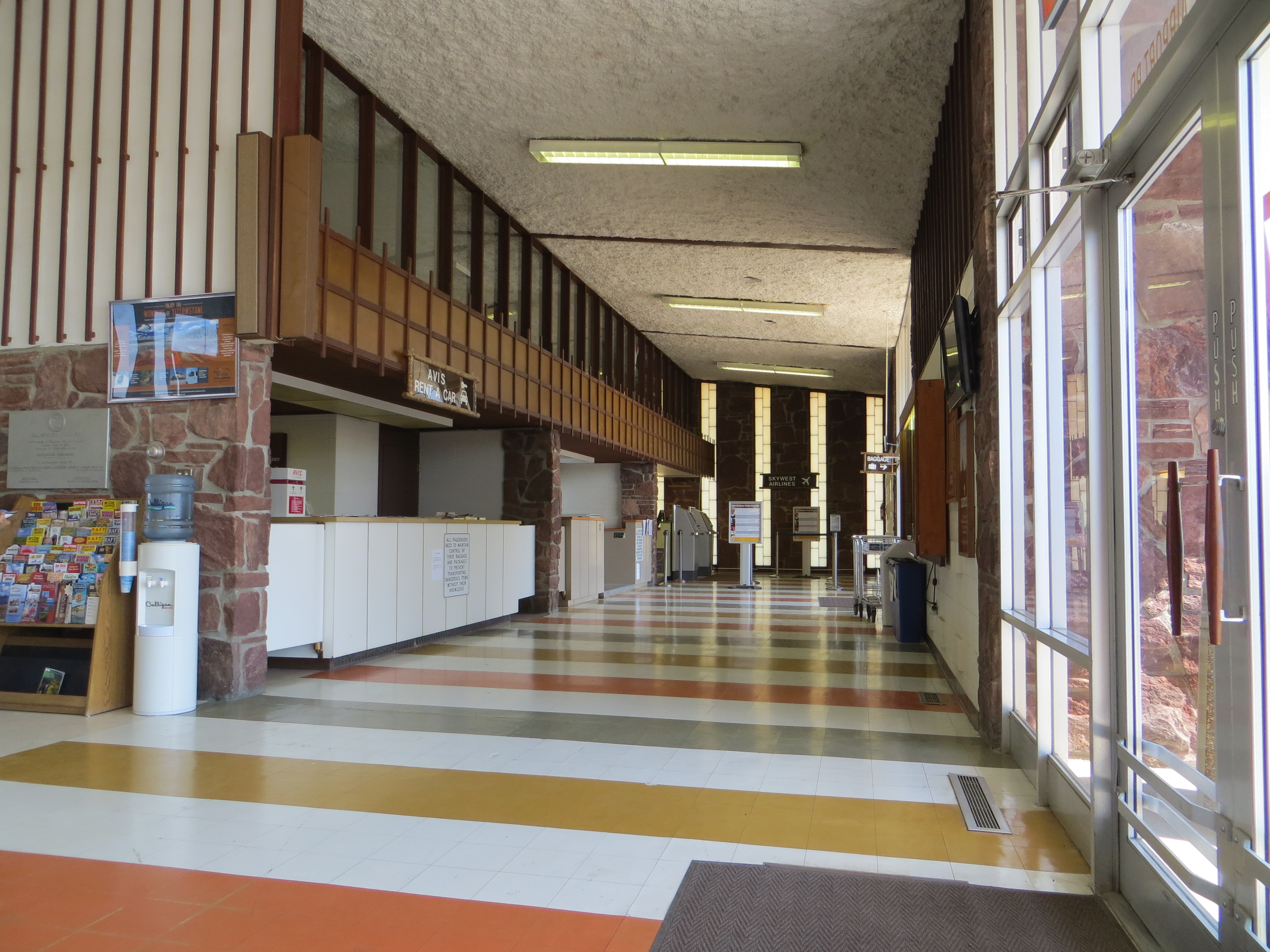
Rental car booths and check-in counters

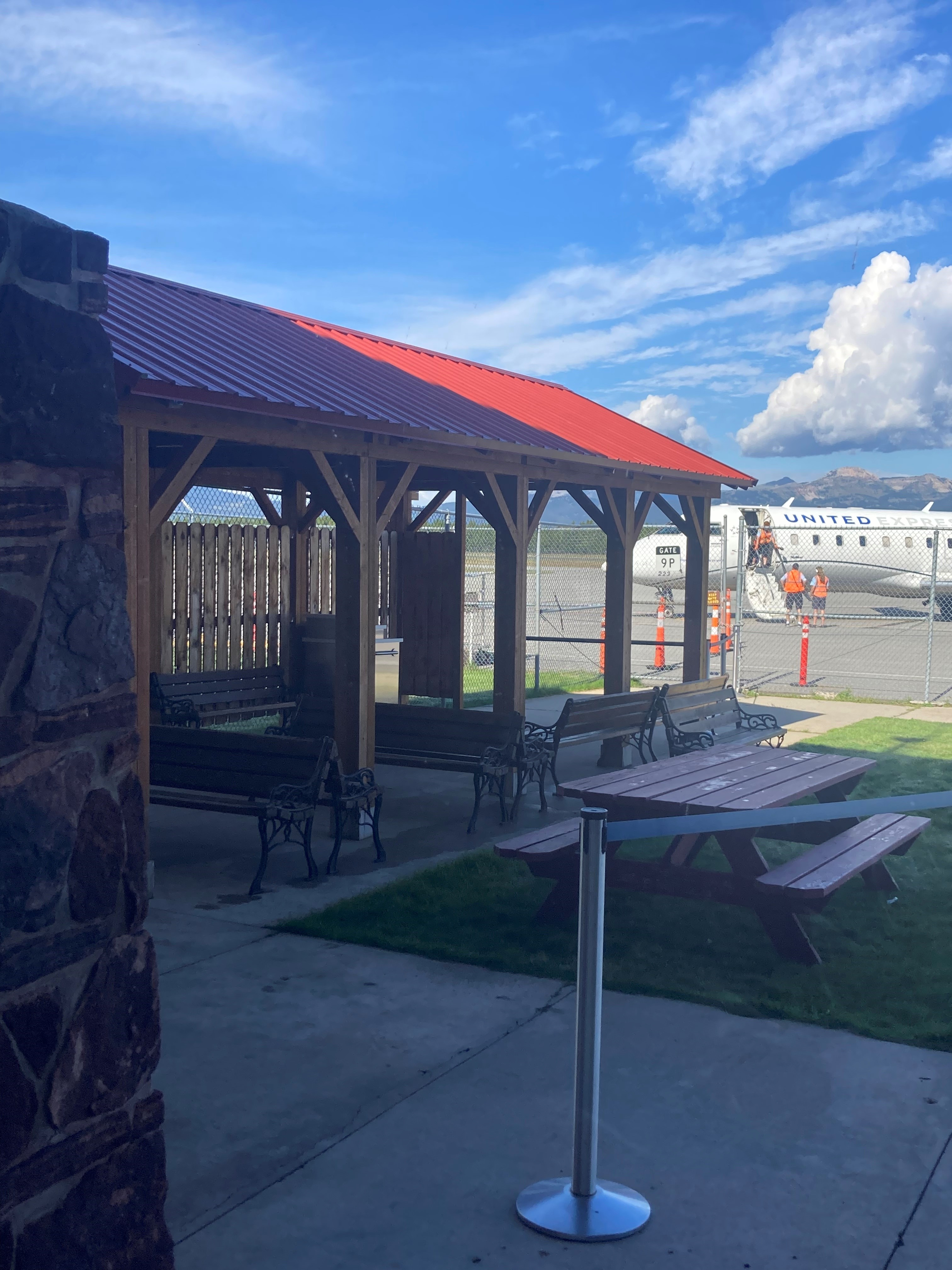
WYS airport outside waiting area overflow

Yellowstone Airport covers an area of 735 acres (297 ha) at an elevation of 6,649 feet (2,027 m) above mean sea level. It has one runway designated 01/19 with an asphalt surface measuring 8,400 by 150 feet (2,560 x 46 m).

Ascension FBO Network, the airport's fixed-base operator (FBO), offers fuel, aircraft/hangar rental, and other services.

One of the largest aircraft ever to use the airport was a USAF KC-135 Stratotanker operated by the Air National Guard with this aerial refueling tanker jet performing several "touch and go" landings and takeoffs on June 8, 2022.

=== West Yellowstone Interagency Fire Center ===
The federal West Yellowstone Interagency Fire Center oversees aerial fire fighting operations and is located two miles north of the Yellowstone National Park Gateway community of West Yellowstone, MT, 90 miles south of Bozeman, Montana, and 100 miles northeast of Idaho Falls, Idaho. The base was established in 1951 at the old airport just west of town and then moved to its present location in 1965. It is jointly operated by the U.S. Forest Service (USFS) and the National Park Service (NPS). USFS is an agency of the U.S. Department of Agriculture while NPS is an agency of the U.S. Department of the Interior.

During the summer the base is home to 21 smokejumpers, pilots for the jump plane and fire fighting air tanker, an office manager, and an air tanker base manager. The base also supports visiting jumpers, tankers and other aerial firefighting resources during times of high fire activity. The "jump ship" aircraft is a Dornier 228 twin turboprop aircraft configured for smokejumper operations while the air tanker aircraft varies between converted British Aerospace BAe 146 and McDonnell Douglas MD-87 jet aircraft (both formerly operated in passenger airline service) as well as Lockheed C-130 and Canadair CL-415 turboprop aircraft. These Next-Gen firefighting aircraft can carry up to 3,000 gallons of firefighting retardant and support the greater Yellowstone area. The West Yellowstone jumpers and the air tanker are considered national resources. While attached to the Gallatin National Forest with a primary response area of the Gallatin, Shoshone, Beaverhead/Deerlodge, Targhee, Bridger/Teton, and Custer National Forests as well as Yellowstone National Park and Teton National Park, they can be dispatched anywhere in the country to respond to wildfires on federal lands.

== Airlines and destinations ==
The airport is served on a seasonal basis by SkyWest Airlines operating as Delta Connection, with Bombardier CRJ-900 regional jet aircraft flying nonstop to and from the Delta hub located at Salt Lake City Airport (SLC). After serving the airport for many years with Embraer EMB-120 Brasilia turboprops, SkyWest upgraded its seasonal Delta Connection service into West Yellowstone with Canadair regional jets on June 1, 2015, thus marking the first time WYS has had jet service in nearly 30 years, according to the airline. SkyWest also currently operates seasonal service flying as United Express on behalf of United Airlines with nonstop flights between Denver (DEN) and the airport operated with Canadair CRJ-200 regional jets. These are the only commercial airlines operating out of the airport as of August 2024.

Airlines	Destinations
Delta Connection	Seasonal: Salt Lake City
United Express	Seasonal: Denver

Destinations map
Destinations from Yellowstone Airport
Green = Seasonal destination

== Statistics ==
=== Top destinations ===
Busiest domestic destinations from WYS (August 2024 – July 2025)
Rank	Airport	Passengers	Airline
1	Salt Lake City, Utah	6,830	Delta Connection
2	Denver, Colorado	3,920	United Express

== Construction of new terminal ==
A new terminal opened in June 2025, replacing an outdated 1960s building and adding modern features such as air conditioning, restrooms beyond the security checkpoint and an indoor baggage claim.

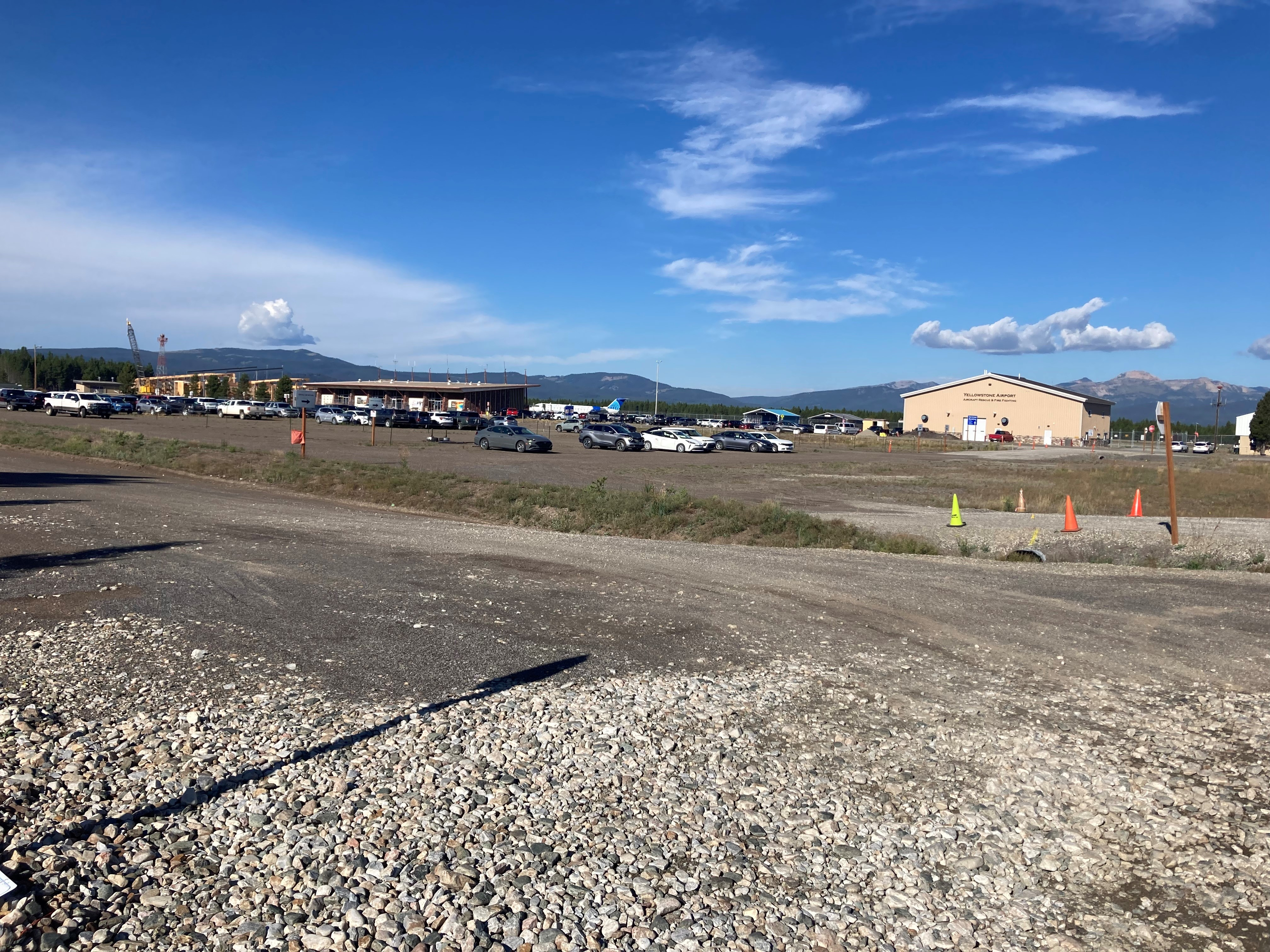
WYS airport construction of new terminal from the approach road

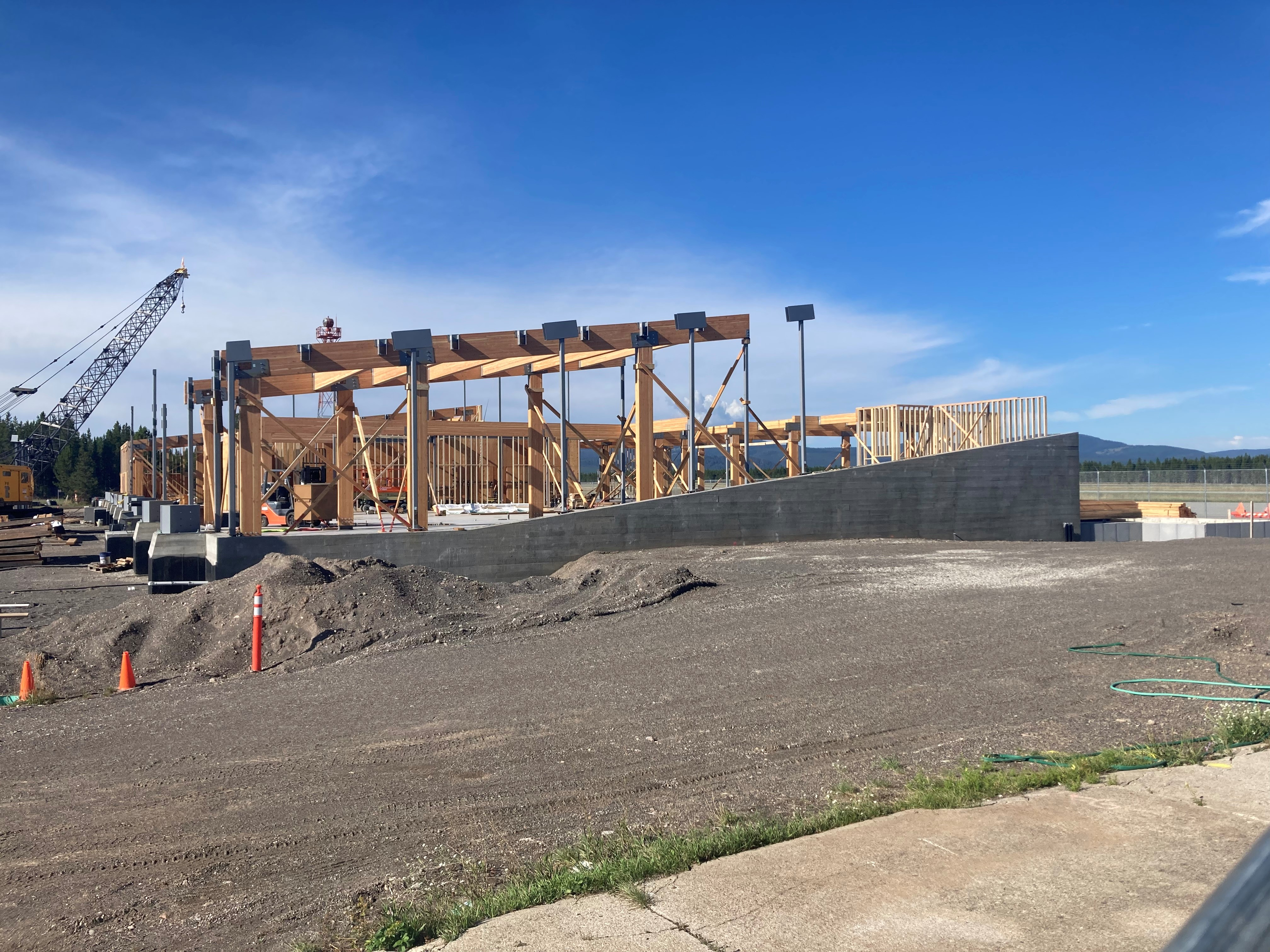
WYS airport new terminal construction, August 2023

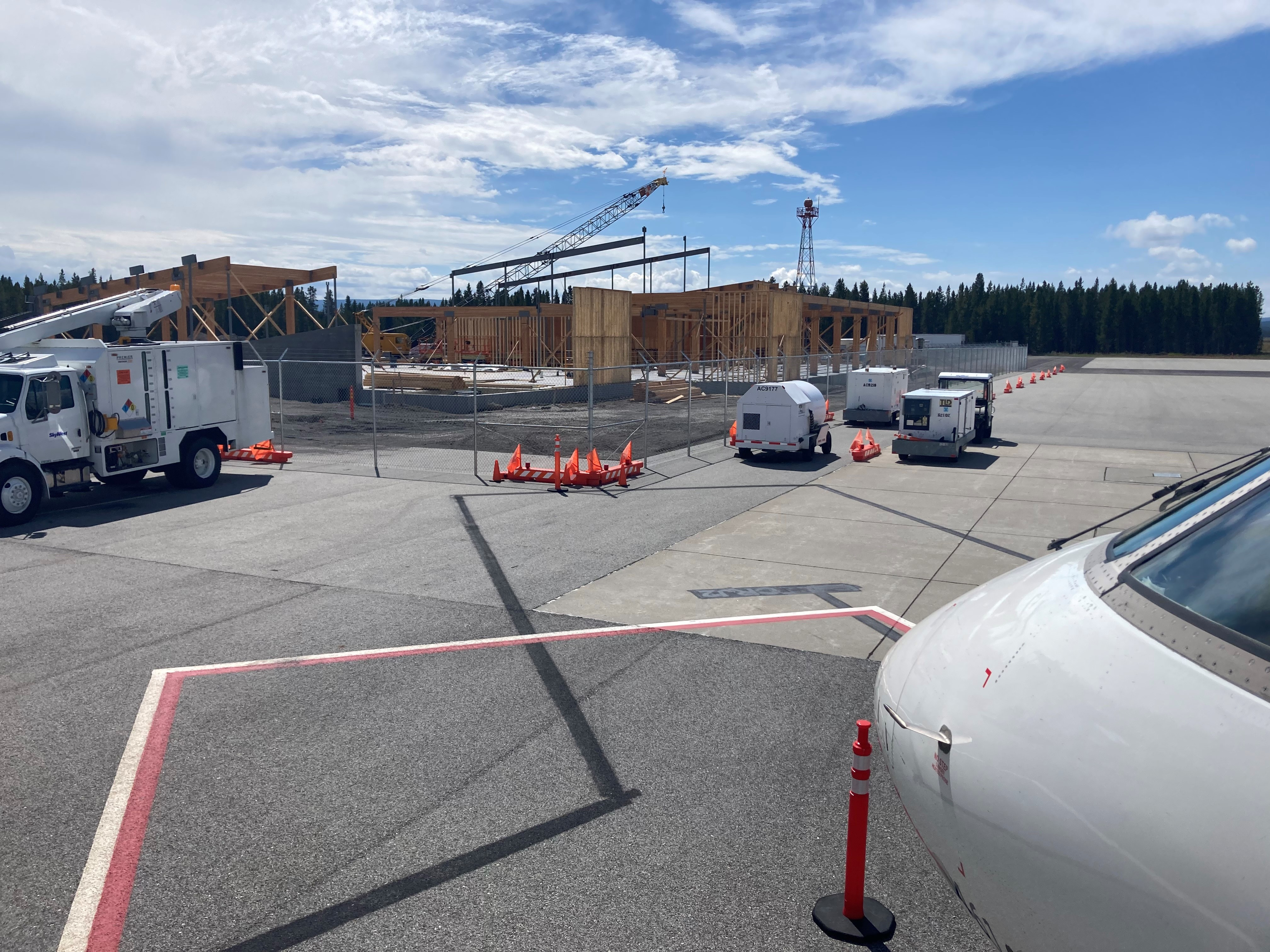
WYS airport new terminal construction taken from the tarmac on deplaning

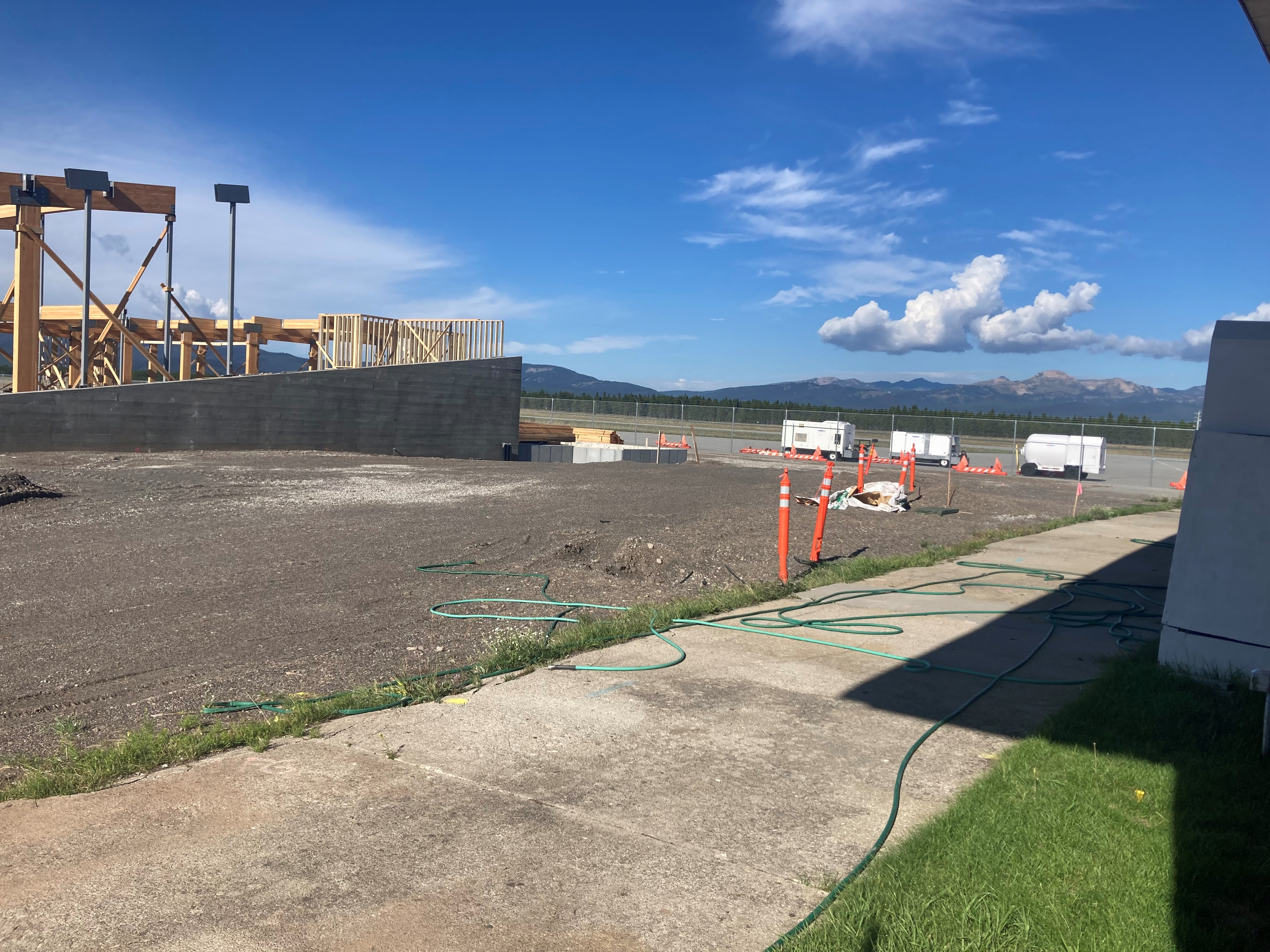
WYS airport new terminal construction, August 2023

== See also ==
- List of airports in Montana

== Other sources ==
- Essential Air Service documents (Docket DOT-OST-2003-14626 Archived 2012-09-25 at the Wayback Machine) from the U.S. Department of Transportation:
  - Order 2006-3-29 Archived 2012-09-25 at the Wayback Machine: selecting SkyWest Airlines d/b/a Delta Connection to provide essential air service (EAS) with 30-passenger Embraer Brasília aircraft at West Yellowstone, Montana, for the 2006 and 2007 summer seasons. The subsidy rate will be set at $247,122 per season.
  - Order 2008-1-4 Archived 2012-09-25 at the Wayback Machine: selecting SkyWest Airlines d/b/a Delta Connection to provide essential air service (EAS) with 30-passenger Embraer Brasília aircraft at West Yellowstone, Montana, for the 2008 and 2009 summer seasons. The subsidy rate will be set at $431,996 per season.
  - Order 2010-3-30 Archived 2012-09-25 at the Wayback Machine: selecting SkyWest Airlines d/b/a Delta Connection to continue to provide essential air service (EAS) at West Yellowstone, Montana, at an annual subsidy rate of $427,757, for the next two summer seasons from June 1 through September 30, 2010 and 2011.
  - Order 2012-4-9 Archived 2012-09-25 at the Wayback Machine: selecting SkyWest Airlines to continue to provide Essential Air Service (EAS) at West Yellowstone, Montana, at an annual subsidy rate of $389,412, for the next summer season from June 1 through September 30, 2012.
