= WYBO =

- Waynesboro, Georgia; United States
- Broadcast area: Augusta, Georgia
- Frequency: 92.9 MHz

Programming
- Format: Classic Soul and Beach oldies

Ownership
- Owner: Big Show Holdings

History
- First air date: March 2016
- Call sign meaning: WaYnesBOro

Technical information
- Licensing authority: FCC
- Facility ID: 166071
- Class: A
- ERP: 4,300 watts
- HAAT: 99 meters (325 ft)
- Transmitter coordinates: 33°13′06.00″N 82°02′31.00″W

Links
- Public license information: Public file; LMS

WYBO (92.9 FM) is a radio station broadcasting a rhythmic oldies format licensed to Waynesboro, Georgia, and serving the Augusta metropolitan area. The station is currently owned by John Smith, and signed on in March 2016.

== Programming ==
The station currently programs a format consisting of classic soul and beach music.
