= Willem Lange =

American author and TV host (born 1935)

Willem Lange (born 1935) is an American author, newspaper columnist, and television presenter.

== Early life and education ==
Willem Lange was born in Albany, New York, in 1935. He became fluent in sign language at an early age; his parents were deaf. In 1950, he began to attend a prep school in New England in lieu of attending a reformatory in his home state of New York.

In 1962, Lange earned a BA after nine years from the College of Wooster. During the nine years it took for him to graduate, Lange worked a number of jobs, including as a construction worker, announcer for bobsled races, factory worker, taxi driver, bartender, and cowboy, among other jobs.

== Career ==
Following his graduation, Lange settled in northern New York State and became a high school English teacher. During his summers upstate, he served as an Outward Bound USA instructor.

From 1968 to 1972, Lange was the director of the Dartmouth Outward Bound Center. Thereafter, he spent thirty-five years working as a general contractor in Hanover, New Hampshire.

In 1981, Lange created A Yankee Notebook, a syndicated newspaper column that he writes that is published across New England. He has also worked as a commentator for Vermont Public Radio and has served 18 seasons as host of Windows to the Wild, an outdoor recreation television program aired on New Hampshire Public Television.

=== A Christmas Carol ===
Since 1975, Lange has read A Christmas Carol to a television audience during Christmastime. He uses the original prompter script used by Charles Dickens for a 1867–68 tour of the United States.

Lange had first heard the version in 1953 while at college, where the version was traditionally performed in the college's chapel prior to students going home for Christmas break. Lange began performing it in his home, eventually moving to St. Thomas Church in Hanover, New Hampshire, when audiences outgrew the space.

=== Favor Johnson: A Christmas Story ===
Every Christmas Eve since 1994, public radio stations in Vermont air Lange's Favor Johnson: A Christmas Story.

Favor Johnson is a Vermont farmer who lives by himself with his dog Hercules and farm animals. One Christmas Eve, his dog's life is saved by his physician new neighbor, who brings Johnson a fruitcake the next morning when he comes to check on his patient. This inspires Johnson to start a tradition of delivering homemade fruitcakes house-to-house to his neighbors each Christmas Eve. Lange told Vermont Public Radio that Favor Johnson was based on a true series of events when a neighbor's dog was accidentally shot by rabbit hunters on Christmas Eve and another neighbor, a physician, saved the dog's life, and the dog's owner, who had been an army cook, started baking fruitcakes for his neighbors.

The story was published as a picture book in 2009 by Bunker Hill Publishing with illustrations by Bert Dodson.

== Awards and honors ==
For Lange's work on Windows to the Wild, he won a Boston/New England Emmy award for "Outstanding Program Host".

In 2021, Franklin Pierce University awarded Lange with the Fitzwater Medallion for Leadership in Public Communication.

== Personal life ==
In 1959, Lange married his wife Ida. Together they had three children. Ida died in 2018. He lives in East Montpelier, Vermont.

== Books ==
- Words from the Wild (Bauhan Publishing, 2015)
- The White-Footed Mouse (Bunker Hill Publishing, 2012)
- A Dream of Dragons (Bunker Hill Publishing, 2011)
- Favor Johnson: A Christmas Story (Bunker Hill Publishing, 2009)
- Intermittent Bliss: Reflections on a Long Love Affair (University Press of New England, 2003)
- John and Tom (Vermont Folklife Center, 2001)
- Okay, Let's Try It Again (University Press of New England, 1999)
- Tales from the Edge of the Woods (University Press of New England, 1998)
