= KSCQ =

- Silver City, New Mexico; United States
- Frequency: 92.9 MHz
- Branding: The Q 92.9

Programming
- Format: Hot adult contemporary

Ownership
- Owner: Skywest Media LLC

History
- First air date: November 28, 1989

Technical information
- Licensing authority: FCC
- Facility ID: 3367
- Class: C2
- ERP: 11,500 watts
- HAAT: 312 meters (1,024 ft)
- Transmitter coordinates: 32°50′40″N 108°14′18″W

Links
- Public license information: Public file; LMS
- Website: silvercityradio.com/our-stations

KSCQ is a radio station airing a hot adult contemporary format licensed to Silver City, New Mexico, broadcasting on 92.9 FM. The station is owned by Skywest Media LLC.
