= KVRE =

American radio station

- Hot Springs Village, Arkansas; United States
- Broadcast area: Central Arkansas
- Frequency: 92.9 MHz

Programming
- Format: Soft Oldies - Standards

Ownership
- Owner: Caddo Broadcasting

History
- First air date: February 1994
- Call sign meaning: Village Radio Entertainment

Technical information
- Licensing authority: FCC
- Facility ID: 8150
- Class: C3
- ERP: 25,000 watts
- HAAT: 100 meters (330 ft)
- Transmitter coordinates: 34°38′32″N 93°04′18″W

Links
- Public license information: Public file; LMS
- Webcast: Listen live (via iHeartRadio)
- Website: kvre.com

KVRE (92.9 FM) is a commercial radio station in Hot Springs Village, Arkansas. It is owned by Caddo Broadcasting with studios on DeSoto Center Drive. The station plays soft oldies with an occasional standard and some newer titles. The morning show includes news and weather updates and late mornings feature a call-in show on local issues. It uses the slogan "Your neighborhood station."

KVRE's transmitter is sited off Gary Crane Trail in Hot Springs Village.

== See also ==
- 1994 in radio
