= WQKA-LP =

- Pulteney, New York; United States
- Frequency: 92.9 MHz
- Branding: Keuka 92.9

Programming
- Format: Variety

Ownership
- Owner: Keuka Broadcasters, Inc.

Technical information
- Licensing authority: FCC
- Facility ID: 194152
- Class: L1
- ERP: 50 watts
- HAAT: 62 metres (203 ft)
- Transmitter coordinates: 42°31′11.6″N 77°07′54.5″W

Links
- Public license information: LMS
- Website: Official Website

WQKA-LP (92.9 FM) is a radio station licensed to serve the community of Pulteney, New York. The station is owned by Keuka Broadcasters, Inc. It airs a variety radio format.

The station was assigned the WQKA-LP call letters by the Federal Communications Commission on February 11, 2014.
