= Tokai Radio Broadcasting =

Radio station in Nagoya, Aichi Prefecture, Japan

Tokai Radio Broadcasting Company, Limited
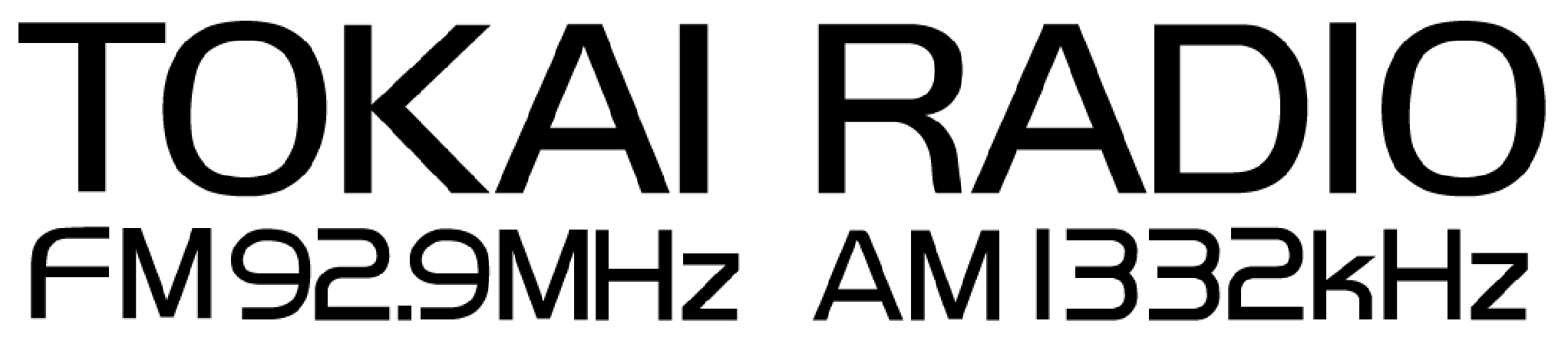

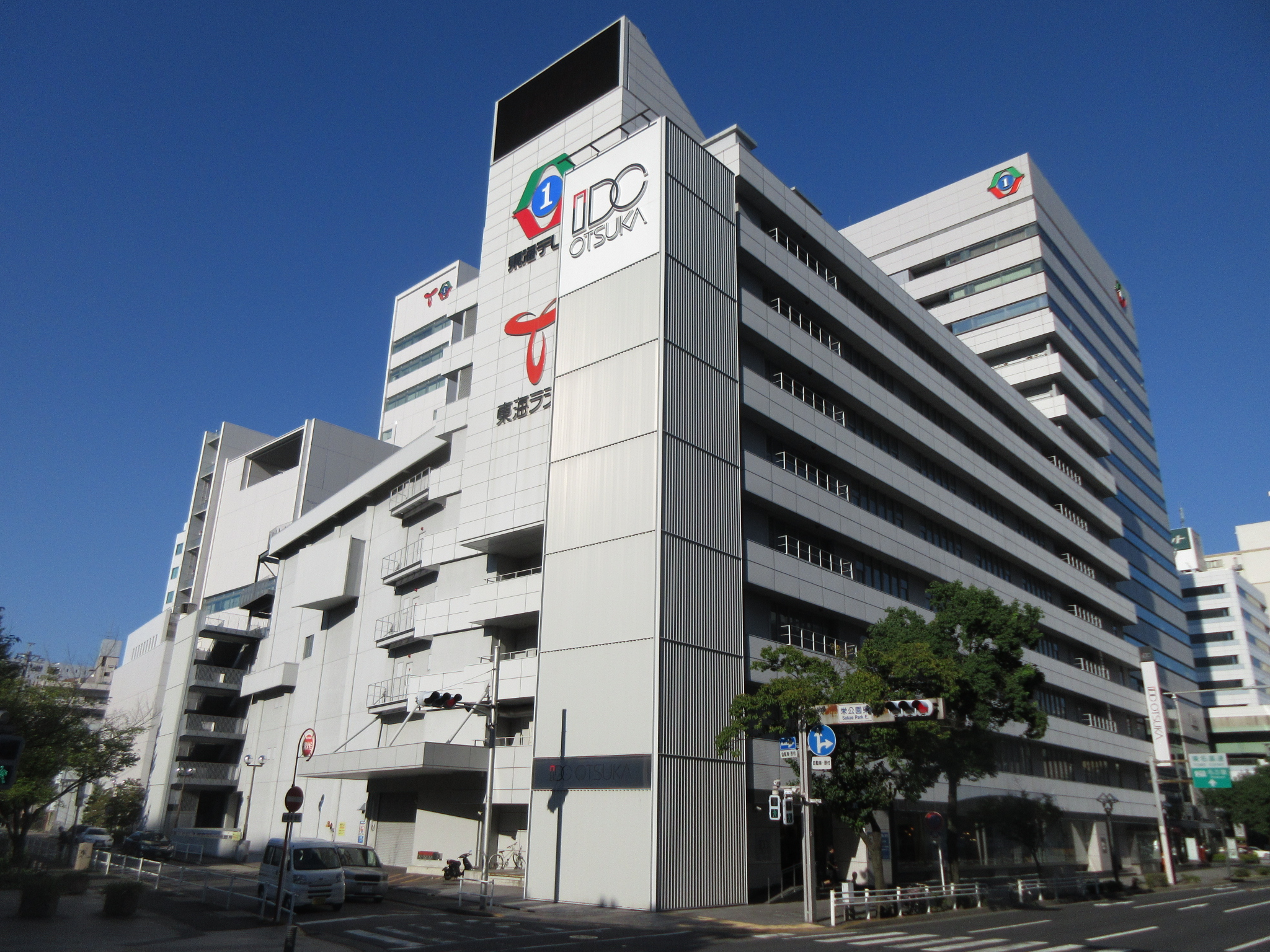
- Headquarters in Higashi-ku, Nagoya
- Native name: 東海ラジオ放送株式会社
- Romanized name: Tōkai Rajio Hōsō Kabushiki-gaisha
- Type: Private KK
- Industry: Media
- Founded: November 20, 1959; 66 years ago
- Headquarters: Higashisakura, Higashi-ku, Nagoya, Aichi Prefecture, Japan
- Services: Radio network
- Owner: Chunichi Shimbun (37.13%)
- Website: www.tokairadio.co.jp

JOSF
- Nagoya; Japan
- Broadcast area: Chubu region
- Frequencies: 1332 kHz (AM); 92.9 MHz (FM)
- Branding: Tokai Radio

Programming
- Language: Japanese
- Affiliations: National Radio Network

Ownership
- Owner: Tokai Radio Broadcasting Company, Limited

History
- First air date: April 1, 1960; 66 years ago

Technical information
- Licensing authority: MIC

'Tokai Radio Broadcasting Co., Ltd. (東海ラジオ放送株式会社, Tōkai Rajio Hōsō Kabushiki-gaisha) is a Japanese radio station based in Higashi-ku, Nagoya,serving the areas of Aichi, Gifu, and Mie Prefecture. The station is an affiliate with the National Radio Network, with its headquarters and studios being located in the Higashi-ku ward of Nagoya alongside Tokai Television.

Despite being a full-NRN core affiliate, the station opts-out airing the flagship All Night Nippon program in favor of its own late night programming, which is an instant hit among fans of the station. Currently, SF airs 2 editions of All Night Nippon - All Night Nippon MUSIC 10, and All Night Nippon Zero. The flagship show currently airs on rival station CBC Radio, which is a core affiliate of JRN.
