= List of radio stations in Arizona =

The following is a list of FCC-licensed radio stations in the U.S. state of Arizona, which can be sorted by their call signs, frequencies, cities of license, licensees, and programming formats.

== List of radio stations ==
Call sign	Frequency	City of license	Licensee	Format
KAAA	1230 AM	Kingman	Cameron Broadcasting, Inc.	News/Talk/Information
KAFF	930 AM	Flagstaff	Flagstaff Radio, Inc.	News/Talk
KAFF-FM	92.9 FM	Flagstaff	Flagstaff Radio, Inc.	Country
KAFZ	99.7 FM	Ash Fork	Alex Media, Inc.	1980s rock
KAHM	102.1 FM	Prescott	Phoenix Radio Broadcasting, LLC	Easy Listening
KAIC	88.9 FM	Tucson	Calvary Chapel of Tucson, Inc.	Contemporary Christian
KAIH	89.3 FM	Lake Havasu City	Advance Ministries, Inc. d/b/a New Life Christian School	Contemporary Christian
KAIZ	105.5 FM	Avondale	Educational Media Foundation	Worship music (Air1)
KAJM	1580 AM	Tempe	Sierra H Broadcasting	Rhythmic oldies
KALV-FM	101.5 FM	Phoenix	Audacy License, LLC	Pop contemporary hit radio
KAPR	930 AM	Douglas	Sonora Broadcasting, LLC	Talk
KATO	1230 AM	Safford	Double-R-Communications LLC	News/Talk/Sports
KAWC-FM	88.9 FM	Yuma	Arizona Western College	Public radio
KAWN	91.3 FM	Winslow	American Family Association	Religious Talk (AFR)
KAWP	88.9 FM	Parker	Arizona Western College	Public radio
KAZG	1440 AM	Scottsdale	Phoenix FCC License Sub, LLC	Oldies
KAZK	89.7 FM	Willcox	Educational Media Foundation	Religious (Radio Nueva Vida)
KAZM	780 AM	Sedona	Tabback Broadcasting Co.	News/Talk/Sports
KBAQ	89.5 FM	Phoenix	Maricopa County Community College District	Classical/Public radio
KBLU	560 AM	Yuma	EDB VV License LLC	News/Talk/Sports
KBMB	710 AM	Black Canyon City	Entravision Holdings, LLC	Silent
KBMH	90.3 FM	Holbrook	American Family Association	Religious Talk (AFR)
KBRP-LP	96.1 FM	Bisbee	Bisbee Radio Project, Inc	Variety
KBSZ	1260 AM	Apache Junction	1TV.com	Urban adult contemporary
KBTK	97.1 FM	Kachina Village	Stone Canyon of Flagstaff, LLC	Talk
KBUX	96.5 FM	Quartzsite	Dennis Vosper, Personal Representative for the Marvin Vosper Estate	Classic hits
KCAZ	99.5 FM	Rough Rock	The Navajo Nation	Country
KCDQ	95.3 FM	Douglas	Cochise Broadcasting, LLC	Adult contemporary
KCDS-LP	90.1 FM	Tucson	Iglesia Centro de Sanidad	Spanish Religious
KCDX	103.1 FM	Florence	Desert West Air Ranchers Corporation	Classic rock
KCEC-FM	104.5 FM	Wellton	Farmworker Educational Radio Network, Inc.	Regional Spanish
KCEE	690 AM	Tucson	Calvary Chapel of Tucson, Inc.	Christian
KCFY	88.1 FM	Yuma	Relevant Media, Inc.	Christian hot adult contemporary/Religious
KCKO	107.9 FM	Rio Rico	De La Fuente Media, LLC	Spanish romantic
KCMT	92.1 FM	Green Valley	Arizona Lotus Corp.	Regional Spanish
KCNL	105.9 FM	Quartzsite	Dennis Vosper, Personal Representative for the Marvin Vosper Estate	Silent
KCNN	97.7 FM	Benson	Redrock Media Group LLC	Country
KCUB	1290 AM	Tucson	Radio License Holding CBC, LLC	Sports (ISN)
KCUZ	1490 AM	Clifton	Cochise Broadcasting LLC	Rock
KCWG-LP	100.3 FM	Crown King	Bradshaw Mountain Broadcasting, Inc.	Classic country
KCYK	1400 AM	Yuma	Monstermedia, LLC	Classic country
KDAP-FM	96.5 FM	Douglas	Donna Henderson, personal representative	Country
KDDL	94.3 FM	Chino Valley	Prescott Valley Broadcasting Co., Inc.	Country
KDIF-LP	102.9 FM	Phoenix	Arizona Interfaith Alliance for Worker Justice	Variety
KDJI	1270 AM	Holbrook	Petracom of Holbrook, LLC	News/Talk/Sports
KDKB	93.3 FM	Mesa	Phoenix FCC License Sub, LLC	Alternative rock
KDMM	103.1 FM	Parker Strip	River Rat Radio, LLC	Top 40 (CHR)
KDRI	830 AM	Tucson	Bustos Media Holdings, LLC	Oldies
KDUS	1060 AM	Tempe	Phoenix FCC License Sub, LLC	Sports
KDWR-LP	92.9 FM	Desert Ridge	Walk and Talk Inc	Religious Teaching
KDXU-FM	106.1 FM	Colorado City	Townsquare License, LLC	Sports (FSR)
KEMP	99.3 FM	Payson	Kemp Communications, Inc.	Classic hits
KESZ	99.9 FM	Phoenix	iHM Licenses, LLC	Adult contemporary
KFFN	1490 AM	Tucson	Arizona Lotus Corp.	Sports (ESPN)
KFLG	1000 AM	Bullhead City	Cameron Broadcasting, Inc.	Adult standards
KFLR-FM	90.3 FM	Phoenix	Family Life Broadcasting, Inc.	Religious (Family Life Radio)
KFLT-FM	104.1 FM	Tucson	Family Life Broadcasting, Inc.	Religious (Family Life Radio)
KFLX	92.5 FM	Chino Valley	Stone Canyon of Flagstaff, LLC	1980s hits
KFMA	102.1 FM	Oro Valley	Arizona Lotus Corp.	Active rock
KFMR	97.3 FM	Central Heights–Midland City	Cochise Media Licenses LLC	Adult hits/Adult top 40
KFNN	1510 AM	Mesa	CRC Broadcasting Company	Business News
KFNX	1100 AM	Cave Creek	Futures and Options, Inc., an Arizona Corporation	Talk
KFSZ	106.1 FM	Munds Park	Southwest Media, Inc.	Pop contemporary hit radio
KFUE	106.7 FM	Buckeye	Entravision Holdings, LLC	Bilingual rhythmic
KFXR-FM	107.3 FM	Chinle	iHM Licenses, LLC	Country
KFYI	550 AM	Phoenix	iHM Licenses, LLC	Talk
KGHR	91.3 FM	Tuba City	Tuba City High School Board, Inc.	Variety
KGME	910 AM	Phoenix	iHM Licenses, LLC	Sports (FSR)
KGMN	100.1 FM	Kingman	New West Broadcasting System, Inc.	Country
KGMS	940 AM	Tucson	Tucson Christian Radio, Inc.	Religious
KGNN	97.5 FM	Dewey-Humboldt	Riviera Broadcasting, LLC	Adult contemporary
KGPS-LP	98.7 FM	Kingman	Calvary Chapel of Kingman	Religious Teaching
KGVY	1080 AM	Green Valley	KGVY, LLC	Oldies
KGXL	103.5 FM	Taylor	New Star Broadcasting LLC	Country/Modern AC
KHCK	91.3 FM	Houck	Advance Ministries, Inc.	Religious
KHIL	1250 AM	Willcox	Willcox Radio, LLC	Classic country
KHOT-FM	105.9 FM	Paradise Valley	Univision Radio Illinois, Inc.	Regional Mexican
KHUD	92.9 FM	Tucson	iHM Licenses, LLC	Country
KHYT	107.5 FM	Tucson	Radio License Holding CBC, LLC	Classic hits
KIDD	103.9 FM	Fort Mohave	ITM, LLC	Adult hits
KIDR	740 AM	Phoenix	En Familia, Inc.	Spanish News/Talk/Sports
KIHP	1310 AM	Mesa	Relevant Radio, Inc.	Catholic
KIIM-FM	99.5 FM	Tucson	Radio License Holding CBC, LLC	Country
KIKO	1340 AM	Apache Junction	1TV.Com, Inc.	Classic country
KISJ-LP	91.3 FM	Bisbee	Borderlands Community Media Foundation, Inc.	Variety
KJAA	1240 AM	Globe	Globecasting, Inc.	Oldies
KJDB-LP	94.1 FM	Sierra Vista	Parakletos Church, Inc.	Religious Teaching
KJIK	100.7 FM	Duncan	WSK Family Credit Shelter Trust UTA	Adult contemporary
KJNN-LP	94.3 FM	Holbrook	Holbrook Adventist Educational Radio Corporation	Christian (Radio 74 Internationale)
KJPN	89.3 FM	Payson	Payson Seventh-Day Adventist Church	Religious (Radio 74 Internationale)
KJTA	89.9 FM	Flagstaff	Family Life Broadcasting, Inc.	Contemporary Christian
KJZA	89.5 FM	Drake	En Familia, Inc.	Jazz/Classical
KJZK	90.7 FM	Kingman	En Familia, Inc.	Jazz/Classical
KJZP	90.1 FM	Prescott	En Familia, Inc.	Jazz/Classical
KJZZ	91.5 FM	Phoenix	Maricopa County Community College District	Public radio
KKFR	98.3 FM	Mayer	Riviera Broadcasting, LLC	Rhythmic Hot AC
KKLD	95.9 FM	Cottonwood	Yavapai Broadcasting Corporation	Classic hits
KKMR	106.5 FM	Arizona City	Educational Media Foundation	Worship music (Air1)
KKNT	960 AM	Phoenix	Caron Broadcasting, Inc.	News/Talk
KKYZ	101.7 FM	Sierra Vista	Cochise Broadcasting, LLC	Oldies
KLJX-LP	107.1 FM	Flagstaff	Northern Arizona University	Adult Alternative
KLJZ	93.1 FM	Yuma	Monstermedia, LLC	Hot adult contemporary
KLKA	88.5 FM	Globe	Educational Media Foundation	Contemporary Christian (K-Love)
KLKI	89.9 FM	Bullhead City	Educational Media Foundation	Contemporary Christian (K-Love)
KLNZ	103.5 FM	Glendale	Entravision Holdings, LLC	Regional Spanish
KLPT	90.9 FM	Prescott	Educational Media Foundation	Contemporary Christian (K-Love)
KLPX	96.1 FM	Tucson	Arizona Lotus Corp.	Classic rock
KLPZ	1380 AM	Parker	Learn Broadcasting Corporation	Full service
KLTQ	90.9 FM	Thatcher	Educational Media Foundation	Christian Contemporary (K-Love)
KLTU	88.1 FM	Mammoth	Educational Media Foundation	Contemporary Christian (K-Love)
KLVA	89.9 FM	Superior	Educational Media Foundation	Contemporary Christian (K-Love)
KLVK	89.1 FM	Fountain Hills	Educational Media Foundation	Contemporary Christian (K-Love)
KMGN	93.9 FM	Flagstaff	Flagstaff Radio, Inc.	Mainstream rock
KMKR-LP	99.9 FM	Tucson	Xerocraft, Inc.	Variety
KMLE	107.9 FM	Chandler	Audacy License, LLC	Country
KMMA	97.1 FM	Green Valley	iHM Licenses, LLC	Spanish CHR
KMOG	1420 AM	Payson	Farrell Enterprises, L.L.C.	Country
KMUR	88.3 FM	Bullhead City	Advance Ministries, Inc.	Variety
KMVA	103.9 FM	Gilbert	Riviera Broadcasting, LLC	Adult contemporary
KMVP-FM	98.7 FM	Phoenix	Bonneville International Corporation	Sports (ESPN)
KMXP	96.9 FM	Phoenix	iHM Licenses, LLC	Adult album alternative
KMXZ-FM	94.9 FM	Tucson	Arizona Lotus Corp.	Adult contemporary
KNAA	90.7 FM	Show Low	Arizona Board of Regents/Northern Arizona University	Public radio, Classical
KNAD	91.7 FM	Page	AZ Board of Regents for N. AZ Univ.	Public radio
KNAG	90.3 FM	Grand Canyon Village	Arizona Board of Regents/Northern Arizona University	Public radio
KNAI	860 AM	Phoenix	Farmworker Educational Radio Network, Inc.	Regional Spanish
KNAQ	89.3 FM	Prescott	Northern Arizona University	Public radio
KNAU	88.7 FM	Flagstaff	Northern Arizona University	Public radio, Classical
KNIX-FM	102.5 FM	Phoenix	iHM Licenses, LLC	Country
KNKI	106.7 FM	Pinetop	WSK Family Credit Shelter Trust UTA	Talk/Sports
KNLB	91.1 FM	Lake Havasu City	Advance Ministries, Inc.	Religious
KNNB	88.1 FM	Whiteriver	Apache Radio Broadcasting Corporation	Variety
KNOG	91.1 FM	Nogales	World Radio Network, Inc.	Spanish Contemporary Christian
KNOT	1450 AM	Prescott	Flagstaff Radio, Inc.	Contemporary Christian
KNST	790 AM	Tucson	iHM Licenses, LLC	News/Talk
KNTR	980 AM	Lake Havasu City	Steven M. Greeley	Sports
KNUV	1190 AM	Tolleson	La Promize Company LLC	Spanish News/Talk
KNXN	1470 AM	Sierra Vista	Cochise Broadcasting LLC	Religious
KOAS	105.7 FM	Dolan Springs	Beasley Media Group, LLC	Urban AC
KOFA	1320 AM	Yuma	Arizona Western College	Public radio
KOFH	99.1 FM	Nogales	Felix Corporation	Spanish contemporary hit radio
KOHF-LP	101.1 FM	Florence Community	Tohono O'Odham Nation	Ethnic/Native American
KOHH	90.7 FM	San Lucy	Tohono O'Odham Nation	Ethnic/Native American
KOHN	91.9 FM	Sells	Tohono O'Odham Nation	Ethnic/Native American
KOHT	98.3 FM	Marana	iHM Licenses, LLC	Urban contemporary
KOMR	106.3 FM	Sun City	Univision Radio Illinois, Inc.	Spanish adult hits
KOOL-FM	94.5 FM	Phoenix	Audacy License, LLC	Classic hits
KOWI	101.3 FM	Oatman	Educational Media Foundation	Worship music (Air1)
KOY	1230 AM	Phoenix	iHM Licenses, LLC	Regional Mexican
KPGE	1340 AM	Page	Lake Powell Communications, Inc.	Silent
KPHX	1480 AM	Phoenix	La Hermosa Radio LLC	Talk
KPIH-LP	98.9 FM	Payson	Rim Catholic Evangelization Assoc.	Catholic
KPJM	88.1 FM	Payson	KPJM-LP, Inc.	
KPKR	95.7 FM	Parker	River Rat Radio, LLC	Adult hits
KPKX-LP	92.7 FM	Globe	Globe Miami Community Radio	Rock
KPPV	106.9 FM	Prescott Valley	Prescott Valley Broadcasting Co., Inc.	Adult contemporary
KPUB	91.7 FM	Flagstaff	Northern Arizona University	Public radio
KPUP-LP	91.9 FM	Patagonia	Patagonia Community Radio, Inc.	Variety
KPXQ	1360 AM	Glendale	Caron Broadcasting, Inc.	Religious
KPYT-LP	100.3 FM	Tucson	Pascua Yaqui Tribe, A Federally Recognized Indian Tribe	Ethnic/Native American
KPYU-LP	100.7 FM	Old Pascua Village	Pascua Yaqui Tribe, A Federally Recognized Indian Tribe	Ethnic/Native American
KQAZ	101.7 FM	Springerville	WSK Family Credit Shelter Trust UTA	Adult contemporary
KQBU-FM	105.1 FM	Wickenburg	Univision Radio Illinois, Inc.	Spanish sports
KQMR	100.3 FM	Globe	Univision Radio Illinois, Inc.	Spanish Latin Pop
KQNA	1130 AM	Prescott Valley	Prescott Valley Broadcasting Co., Inc.	News/Talk/Sports
KQSR	100.9 FM	Yuma	EDB VV License LLC	Classic hits
KQSS	101.9 FM	Miami	Globecasting, Inc.	Country
KQST	102.9 FM	Sedona	Yavapai Broadcasting Corporation	Pop contemporary hit radio
KRCI	89.5 FM	Pinetop-Lakeside	Truth and Life Ministries	Religious
KRCY-FM	96.7 FM	Lake Havasu City	Rick L. Murphy	Classic hits
KRDE	94.1 FM	San Carlos	Linda C. Corso	Country
KRDP	90.7 FM	Apache Junction	Desert Soul Media, Inc.	Jazz/Community radio
KRDX	103.7 FM	Corona de Tucson	Desert West Air Ranchers Corporation (A Wyoming Corporation)	Oldies
KREE	88.1 FM	Pirtleville	Radio Bilingue, Inc.	Spanish
KRFM	98.5 FM	Show Low	Petracom of Holbrook, LLC	Adult contemporary
KRIM-LP	96.3 FM	Payson	Payson Council For The Musical Arts, Inc.	Classic hits
KRIT	93.9 FM	Parker	Farmworker Educational Radio Network, Inc.	Regional Mexican
KRJY-LP	101.5 FM	Yuma	Radio Revista Nuevo Amanacer Ministries, Inc.	Spanish religious
KRMB	90.1 FM	Bisbee	World Radio Network, Inc.	Spanish Contemporary Christian
KRMC	91.7 FM	Douglas	World Radio Network, Inc.	Spanish Contemporary Christian
KRMH	89.7 FM	Red Mesa	Red Mesa Unified School Dist No. 27	Native American Variety
KRPH	99.5 FM	Morristown	La Promize Company, LLC	Spanish Talk
KRQQ	93.7 FM	Tucson	iHM Licenses, LLC	Pop contemporary hit radio
KRRK	100.7 FM	Desert Hills	Smoke and Mirrors, LLC	Classic rock
KRSN-LP	99.7 FM	Show Low	Show Low Radio	Country
KRVZ	1400 AM	Springerville	WSK Family Credit Shelter Trust UTA	Talk
KRWV-LP	99.3 FM	Gold Canyon	Gold Canyon Public Radio Inc	Smooth Jazz/Variety
KRXD	97.7 FM	McNary	New Star Broadcasting LLC	Adult hits
KSAZ	580 AM	Marana	Kasa Radio Hogar, Inc.	Spanish
KSCW-LP	103.1 FM	Sun City	Recreation Centers of Sun City West, Inc.	Variety
KSED	107.5 FM	Sedona	Stone Canyon of Flagstaff, LLC	Country
KSHM	91.3 FM	Show Low	Radio 74 Internationale	Religious (Radio 74 Internationale)
KSLX-FM	100.7 FM	Scottsdale	Phoenix FCC License Sub, LLC	Classic rock
KSNH	88.5 FM	Snowflake	Advance Ministries, Inc. d/b/a New Life Christian School	Religious
KSNX	105.5 FM	Heber	Petracom of Holbrook, LLC	Classic hits
KSUN	1400 AM	Phoenix	Fiesta Radio, Inc.	Spanish
KSWG	96.3 FM	Wickenburg	Barna Broadcasting, LLC	Classic country
KSZN-LP	101.5 FM	Flagstaff	Sunnyside Neighborhood Association of Flagstaff, Inc.	Variety
KSZR	97.5 FM	Oro Valley	Radio License Holding CBC, LLC	Classic hip-hop
KTAN	1420 AM	Sierra Vista	Townsquare License, LLC	Classic rock
KTAR	620 AM	Phoenix	Bonneville International Corporation	Sports (ESPN)
KTAR-FM	92.3 FM	Glendale	Bonneville International Corporation	News/Talk
KTBA	760 AM	Tuba City	Western Indian Ministries, Inc.	Religious
KTBX	98.1 FM	Tubac	Cochise Broadcasting, LLC	Classic rock
KTDT-LP	99.1 FM	Tucson	LPFM Downtown Tucson	Variety
KTGV	106.3 FM	Oracle	Bustos Media Holdings, LLC	Rhythmic adult contemporary
KTHQ	92.5 FM	Eagar	WSK Family Credit Shelter Trust UTA	Country
KTKT	990 AM	Tucson	Arizona Lotus Corp.	Spanish Sports
KTMG	99.1 FM	Prescott	Flagstaff Radio, Inc.	Light Adult contemporary
KTNN	660 AM	Window Rock	The Navajo Nation	Country/Native American Music
KTTI	95.1 FM	Yuma	EDB VV License LLC	Country
KTUC	1400 AM	Tucson	Radio License Holding CBC, LLC	Conservative talk
KTZR	1450 AM	Tucson	iHM Licenses, LLC	Sports (FSR)
KUAS-FM	88.9 FM	Sierra Vista	Arizona Board of Regents for Benefit of University of Ariz.	Public radio
KUAT-FM	90.5 FM	Tucson	Arizona Board of Regents for Benefit of University of Ariz.	Classical
KUAZ	1550 AM	Tucson	Arizona Board of Regents for Benefit of University of Ariz.	Public radio
KUAZ-FM	89.1 FM	Tucson	Arizona Board of Regents for Benefit of University of Ariz.	Public radio
KUGO	102.5 FM	Grand Canyon Village	ITM, LLC	Travel information
KUKY	95.9 FM	Wellton	Hispanic Target Media, Inc.	Regional Spanish
KUOS-LP	92.1 FM	Sedona	International Metaphysical Ministry dba University of Sedona	Variety
KUPD	97.9 FM	Tempe	Phoenix FCC License Sub, LLC	Active rock
KURE-LP	106.1 FM	Eloy	Desert Rose Baha'i Institute, Inc.	Variety
KUYI	88.1 FM	Hotevilla	The Hopi Foundation	Variety
KUYI-LP	89.1 FM	Upper Moenkopi	The Hopi Foundation	Ethnic/Native American
KVAN-LP	91.7 FM	Tucson	Global Change Multi-Media	Variety
KVCC	88.5 FM	Tucson	VCY America, Inc.	Conservative religious
KVCP	88.3 FM	Phoenix	VCY America, Inc.	Conservative Christian
KVGS	107.9 FM	Meadview	Beasley Media Group, LLC	Hot adult contemporary
KVIR	91.9 FM	Dolan Springs	CSN International, Inc.	Religious (CSN International)
KVIT	88.7 FM	Chandler	East Valley Institute of Technology District #401	Adult top 40
KVJC	91.9 FM	Globe	CSN International	Religious (CSN International)
KVNA	600 AM	Flagstaff	Yavapai Broadcasting Corporation	Sports (ESPN)
KVNA-FM	100.1 FM	Flagstaff	Yavapai Broadcasting Corporation	Adult album alternative
KVNG	91.1 FM	Eloy	Calvary Chapel of Casa Grande	Christian contemporary
KVOI	1030 AM	Cortaro	Bustos Media Holdings, LLC	Talk
KVRD-FM	105.7 FM	Cottonwood	Yavapai Broadcasting Corporation	Country
KVSU	106.3 FM	Desert Hills	ITM, LLC	Classic rock
KVVA-FM	107.1 FM	Apache Junction	Entravision Holdings, LLC	Spanish adult hits
KVWM	970 AM	Show Low	Petracom of Holbrook, LLC	News/Talk/Sports
KWAK-LP	102.5 FM	San Xavier	Tohono O'Odham Nation	Ethnic/Native American
KWCD	92.3 FM	Bisbee	Townsquare License, LLC	Country
KWCX-FM	104.9 FM	Tanque Verde	Relevant Radio, Inc.	Catholic radio
KWFH	90.3 FM	Parker	Advance Ministries, Inc. D/B/A	Contemporary Christian
KWIM	104.9 FM	Window Rock	Western Indian Ministries, Inc.	Religious Talk (AFR)
KWKM	95.7 FM	St. Johns	KM Radio of St. Johns, L.L.C.	Hot adult contemporary
KWLP	100.9 FM	Peach Springs	The Hualapai Tribe	Ethnic/Native American
KWMX	96.7 FM	Williams	Stone Canyon of Flagstaff, LLC	Classic rock
KWQR	92.5 FM	Willcox	Versailles Community Broadcasting, Inc.	Classic hits
KWRB	90.9 FM	Bisbee	World Radio Network, Inc.	Contemporary Christian
KWRK	96.1 FM	Window Rock	The Navajo Nation	Country
KWRQ	102.3 FM	Clifton	Double-R-Communications LLC	Hot adult contemporary
KWSQ-LP	99.5 FM	Mesa	KWSF Radio	Independent music/Community radio
KWSS-LP	93.9 FM	Scottsdale	KWSS Radio	Rock
KWXL-LP	98.7 FM	Tucson	Tucson Unified School District	Variety
KXAZ	93.3 FM	Page	Lake Powell Communications, Inc.	Silent
KXBB	101.7 FM	Cienega Springs	River Rat Radio, LLC	Blues
KXCI	91.3 FM	Tucson	Foundation for Creative Broadcasting, Inc.	Variety
KXEG	1280 AM	Phoenix	KXEG AM, LLC	Spanish AC
KXEW	1600 AM	South Tucson	iHM Licenses, LLC	Tejano
KXGC-LP	98.5 FM	Flagstaff	San Francisco de Asis Roman Catholic Parish Flagstaff	Catholic
KXKQ	94.3 FM	Safford	Double-R-Communications LLC	Country
KXKR	101.1 FM	South Tucson	Cochise Broadcasting, LLC	Classic rock
KXQX	92.3 FM	Tusayan	Estrella Broadcasting, LLC	
KXSL	1470 AM	Show Low	New Star Broadcasting LLC	Country
KXWR-LP	92.1 FM	Tsaile	Dine College	Variety
KXWX	93.7 FM	Mohave Valley	Big River Broadcasting LLC	Alternative rock
KXXT	1010 AM	Tolleson	Caron Broadcasting, Inc.	Religious/Spanish religious
KXZK	104.5 FM	Vail	Cochise Broadcasting, LLC	Top 40 (CHR)/Hot AC/Adult album alternative
KYAY	91.1 FM	San Carlos	San Carlos Apache Tribe	Ethnic/Native American
KYBC	1600 AM	Cottonwood	Yavapai Broadcasting Corporation	Adult standards
KYCA	1490 AM	Prescott	Prescott Broadcasting, LLC	Talk
KYET	1170 AM	Golden Valley	Grand Canyon Gateway Broadcasting, LLC	News/Talk/Information
KYMZ	99.9 FM	Somerton	Campesinos Sin Fronteras	Spanish Community
KYOT	95.5 FM	Phoenix	iHM Licenses, LLC	Adult hits
KYRM	91.9 FM	Yuma	World Radio Network, Inc.	Spanish Contemporary Christian
KYVD-LP	92.5 FM	Yuma	Yuma Catholic High School	Catholic
KZAO	89.3 FM	Ajo	Apache Leap Media	
KZBX-LP	92.1 FM	Williams	First Baptist Church of Williams, Arizona	Oldies/Classic Hits
KZCE	101.1 FM	Cordes Lakes	Sierra H. Broadcasting, Inc.	Old School Hip Hop
KZGL	103.7 FM	Flagstaff	Murphy Air, LLC	Alternative rock
KZKE	103.3 FM	Seligman	Route 66 Broadcasting, L.L.C.	Oldies/Classic rock
KZLZ	105.3 FM	Casas Adobes	Bustos Media Holdings, LLC	Regional Spanish
KZMK	100.9 FM	Sierra Vista	Townsquare License, LLC	Pop contemporary hit radio
KZNY	104.3 FM	Camp Verde	Sierra H Broadcasting, Inc.	Soft adult contemporary
KZOM	96.5 FM	Claypool	Orozco Broadcasting	Silent
KZON	95.1 FM	Sun City West	Riviera Broadcasting, LLC	Variety hits
KZRJ-LP	100.5 FM	Jerome	Gulch Radio Broadcasters, Inc.	Variety
KZUA	92.1 FM	Holbrook	Petracom of Holbrook, LLC	Country
KZUL-FM	104.5 FM	Lake Havasu City	Mad Dog Wireless, Inc.	Adult contemporary
KZUZ	93.5 FM	Show Low	Petracom of Holbrook, LLC	Country
KZXK	98.9 FM	Doney Park	Cochise Broadcasting LLC	Classic rock B-sides and rarities
KZZP	104.7 FM	Mesa	iHM Licenses, LLC	Pop contemporary hit radio
KZZZ	1490 AM	Bullhead City	Cameron Broadcasting, Inc.	News/Talk/Sports

== Defunct ==
- KAKA
- KASA
- KCKY (1948–1960)
- KCKY
- KCLF
- KCLS
- KCMA-LP
- KDAP
- KDYW
- KEVT
- KFAS
- KFBR
- KFTT
- KGLU
- KIKX
- KINO
- KJKJ
- KNOG
- KPHF
- KSGC
- KSOM
- KSUN
- KTPM
- KUMA
- KVNC
- KWFM
- KWJB
- KZOW
