= The Director's Cut (radio show) =

Radio show

The Directors Cut Radio Program
- Genre: comedy, talk
- Running time: Sundays 9 AM - 11:00 AM EST (Live)
- Country of origin: United States
- Home station: KWSS Phoenix, Arizona
- Starring: StephSugar Suicide; Daniel Gutierrez; Chris Molony
- Original release: May 21, 2005
- Website: www.directorscutradio.com
- Podcast: www.directorscutradio.com/podcast/

The Director's Cut is a weekly 2 hour movie radio show and podcast, found on several online and terrestrial radio stations.

== History ==
The Director's Cut was created as a weekend "movie talk" program in 2005 on KAGM. Soon it was picked up by KQCX, and KWSS-LP in early 2006. Maintaining thousands of loyal weekly listeners, The Directors Cut, has been nominated 3 years in a row, for The Peoples Choice Podcast Awards. 2006 Best Mobile Podcast, 2007 Movies/Films, 2008 Movies/Films.

The Directors Cut Became a content provider for Archoslink, and Archos Media Players, until Archos stopped production and support for Archoslink software.

The full length radio program can be heard on KWSS-LP KQCX KEIF WETX-LP and many other internet and terrestrial stations.

The Directors Cut "Movie in a Minute" can be heard on KLOO (AM), WCVR, WCFR, WINT, CVUE-FM, KCTT-FM, KTLO-FM, KTLO (AM), WTBC, KCON, WLEM, KBPY

== Cast and notable guests ==
Show Producer Theresa Quinn 2010–Present

Host - Daniel Gutierrez is a member of the Broadcast Film Critics Association and former writer, producer, editor at ReelzChannel

Host - StephSugar Suicide 2018–Present is a model, cosplayer, magician and burlesque entertainer from Las Vegas, NV.

Host - Chris Molony 2013–Present is a comic book and pop culture aficionado. Likes hockey and dislikes a neighbor.

Former Co-Host - Kristin Elliott 2011-2016

Former Technical Producer - Brian Gutierrez

Notable Frequent Guests:

Elitist Corner - Sean Gandert writer for Paste (magazine), ReelzChannel.com, 1UP.com

Russell Pinkston - Middle American Movie Reviewer

Jon Mikl Thor - Rock God and Movie Legend

Zon Son of Thor - Son of Rock God and Movie Legend

Former Co-Host - Oliver Riggle 2006-2011

Former Co-Host - Philip H.R. Gunn 2005-2006

Former Co-Host - Billy Garberina 2005

Former Show Producer - Debra West 2005-2010
