= KISK =

Radio station in Cal-Nev-Ari, Nevada

- Cal-Nev-Ari, Nevada; United States
- Broadcast area: Laughlin, Nevada
- Frequency: 104.9 MHz (HD Radio)
- Branding: Kiss FM

Programming
- Format: Hot adult contemporary

Ownership
- Owner: Murphy Broadcasting; (Smoke and Mirrors, LLC)
- Sister stations: KRRK, KZUL-FM, KRCY

History
- First air date: 2008 (as KVYL)
- Former call signs: KVYL (2007–2008); KVAL (2008–2015)
- Call sign meaning: KISs K

Technical information
- Licensing authority: FCC
- Facility ID: 164263
- Class: C2
- ERP: 1,500 watts
- HAAT: 703 meters (2,306 ft)
- Transmitter coordinates: 35°15′7.99″N 114°45′0.89″W
- Translator: see below

Links
- Public license information: Public file; LMS

KISK is an FM radio station broadcasting a hot adult contemporary format. KISK broadcasts on a frequency of 104.9 Megahertz and is located in Cal-Nev-Ari, Nevada. The broadcasting tower is located on Spirit Mountain.

== Translators ==
FM translators are located in Bullhead City, Arizona, Riviera, Arizona, Kingman, Arizona, Calnevair, Nevada and Peach Springs, Arizona.

Broadcast translators for KISK
Call sign	Frequency	City of license	FID	ERP (W)	HAAT	Class	Transmitter coordinates	FCC info
K242AS	96.3 FM	Bullhead City, Arizona	30447	45	0 m (0 ft)	D	35°14′48″N 114°44′35″W	LMS
K245AW	96.9 FM	Riviera, Arizona	54323	157	682.9 m (2,240 ft)	D	35°14′48″N 114°44′35″W	LMS
K256AA	99.1 FM	Kingman, Arizona	9038	10	1,083 m (3,553 ft)	D	35°4′51.62″N 113°54′13.62″W	LMS
K270CX	101.9 FM	Calnevair, Nevada	156670	250	552.7 m (1,813 ft)	D	35°01′58″N 114°21′57″W	LMS
K298BU	107.5 FM	Peach Springs, Arizona	156403	50	0 m (0 ft)	D	35°15′08″N 114°44′58″W	LMS

== History ==
The station was issued the call sign KVYL on August 13, 2007; on February 15, 2008, it changed to KVAL. The station signed on in 2008 with a hot adult contemporary format. It became KISK on May 29, 2015.
