= KZGL =

- Flagstaff, Arizona; United States
- Broadcast area: Flagstaff, Arizona; Sedona, Arizona
- Frequency: 103.7 MHz (HD Radio)
- Branding: Kazual FM 103.7

Programming
- Format: Top 40
- Subchannels: HD2: Oldies "The True Oldies Channel"; HD3: Classic country "97.9 The Bandit"

Ownership
- Owner: Murphy Air, LLC; (Murphy Air, LLC)
- Sister stations: KFTT, KISK, KRCY-FM, KRRK, KZUL-FM

History
- First air date: 2007; 19 years ago
- Former call signs: KFZA (2006–2007)
- Call sign meaning: Former "Eagle" brand

Technical information
- Licensing authority: FCC
- Facility ID: 165966
- Class: C3
- ERP: 560 watts
- HAAT: 597 meters (1,959 ft)
- Transmitter coordinates: 35°14′25.0″N 111°35′53.0″W
- Translators: HD3: 97.9 K250BI (Flagstaff); 99.3 K257FI (Flagstaff)

Links
- Public license information: Public file; LMS
- Website: murphybroadcasting.com

KZGL (103.7 FM) is an Adult hits formatted broadcast radio station licensed to Flagstaff, Arizona, serving Flagstaff and Sedona in Arizona. KZGL is managed by Murphy Broadcasting.

== Station sold ==
On Early June 2015, Towers Investment Trust began the process to sell KZGL to Murphy Air, LLC, under the licensee of Murphy Air, LLC, for $850,000. The sale was closed on September 3, 2015.
