= Flagstaff station (disambiguation) =

Flagstaff Station is an Amtrak station in Arizona.

Flagstaff station may also refer to:

- United States Naval Observatory Flagstaff Station
- Flagstaff railway station, Melbourne, Australia

Flagstaff station can also be Television and Radio stations in and around Flagstaff, Arizona USA:

- KCFG, full-service television station in Flagstaff, Arizona
- KTFL was a religious television station in Flagstaff, Arizona, broadcasting locally on channel 4 as an affiliate of FamilyNet . …
- KNAZ-TV is a full-power television station serving Flagstaff, Arizona and surrounding areas.
- KFPH-DT is a full-service television station in Flagstaff, Arizona.
- KZGL "Eagle 103.7" is an adult album alternative radio station in Flagstaff, Arizona.
- KSED is a commercial country music radio station in Flagstaff, Arizona
- KAFF-FM is a commercial country music radio station in Flagstaff, Arizona
