= KAFF =

KAFF or Kaff may refer to:

- KAFF (AM), a radio station (930 AM) licensed to Flagstaff, Arizona, United States
- KAFF Appliances, an Indian multi-national appliances firm based in Gurugram, India
- KAFF-FM, a radio station (92.9 FM) licensed to Flagstaff, Arizona, United States
- Kecskemét Animation Film Festival, an biennial animation film festival in Kecsemét, Hungary
- The IATA airport code for the airfield at the United States Air Force Academy
- Kaff Tagon, a fictional character in the webcomic Schlock Mercenary

== See also ==
- Kaffe (disambiguation)
