= KTLO =

KTLO may refer to:

- KTLO (AM), a radio station (1240 AM) licensed to serve Mountain Home, Arkansas, United States
- KTLO-FM, a radio station (97.9 FM) licensed to serve Mountain Home, Arkansas
- KTLO-LD, a low-power television station (channel 29, virtual 46) licensed to serve Colorado Springs, Colorado, United States
- Keep The Lights On, a phrase that refers to the baseline level of effort required to maintain existing functionality or status.
