= KCAZ =

KCAZ may refer to:

- 99.5 KCAZ (FM) Rough Rock, Arizona
- 1480 KCZZ Mission, Kansas — used the callsign KCAZ from 1995 to 1998
- 101.7 KIYS Walnut Ridge, Arkansas — used the callsign KCAZ from 1980 to 1989
- 57 KCAZ-LP Columbus, Nebraska — a defunct low-power TV station
- 29 KHJP-LP Valentine, Nebraska — a defunct low-power TV station that used the callsign KCAZ-LP
