= KOWO =

KOWO may refer to:

- KOWO-LP, a low-power radio station (104.1 FM) licensed to serve Wimberley, Texas, United States
- KWSQ-LP, a low-power radio station (99.5 FM) licensed to serve Mesa, Arizona, United States, which held the call sign KOWO-LP from 2014 to 2015
