= KWRK =

KWRK may refer to:

- KWRK (FM), a radio station (96.1 FM) licensed to serve Window Rock, Arizona, United States
- KWRK-LP, a low-power radio station (90.9 FM) licensed to serve Fairbanks, Alaska, United States
