= KMAC =

KMAC may refer to:

- KECCAK Message Authentication Code, a keyed hash function based on Keccak.
- KMAC-LP, a low-power radio station (92.5 FM) licensed to serve Muscatine, Iowa, United States
- KBOD, a radio station (99.7 FM) licensed to serve Gainesville, Missouri, United States, which held the call sign KMAC from 1988 to 2012
- KSLR, a radio station (630 AM) licensed to serve San Antonio, Texas, United States, which held the call sign KMAC from 1926 to 1983
- Macon Downtown Airport (ICAO code KMAC)
