= KKZN =

KKZN may refer to:

- KRSN-LP, a radio station (99.7 FM) licensed to serve Show Low, Arizona, United States, which held the call sign KKZN-LP from 2020 to 2024; see List of radio stations in Arizona
- KDFD, a radio station (760 AM) licensed to serve Thornton, Colorado, United States, which held the call sign KKZN from 2002 to 2015
- WBAP-FM, a radio station (93.3 FM) licensed to serve Haltom City, Texas, United States, which held the call sign KKZN from 1996 to 1999
