= KMEO =

KMEO may refer to:

- KMEO (FM), a radio station (91.9 MHz) in Mertzon, Texas
- KRXA, a radio station (540 AM) in Burbank, California, which held the call sign KMEO from 2004 to 2005
- KTCK-FM, a radio station (96.7 FM) in Flower Mound, Texas, which held the call sign KMEO from 1998 to 2003
- KSWG, a radio station (96.3 FM) in Wickenburg, Arizona, which held the call sign KMEO from 1993 to 1995
- KIDR, a radio station (740 AM) in Phoenix, Arizona, which held the call sign KMEO from 1967 to 1992
- KMXP, a radio station (96.9 FM) in Phoenix, Arizona, which held the call sign KMEO from 1964 to 1967 and KMEO-FM from 1967 to 1991
