= KPKX =

KPKX may refer to:

- KPKX-LP, a low-power radio station (92.7 FM) licensed to serve Globe, Arizona, United States
- KRSN-LP, a low-power radio station (99.7 FM) licensed to serve Show Low, Arizona, which held the call sign KPKX-LP from 2015 to 2020
- KMVP-FM, a radio station (98.7 FM) licensed to serve Phoenix, Arizona, which held the call sign KPKX from 2005 to 2014
