= KAIZ =

KAIZ may refer to:

- KAIZ (FM), a radio station (105.5 FM) licensed to Avondale, Arizona, United States
- Lee C. Fine Memorial Airport (ICAO code KAIZ)
