= KSGC =

KSGC may refer to:

- KSGC-LP, a low-power radio station (100.5 FM) licensed to serve Garden City, Kansas, United States
- KSGC (defunct), a defunct radio station (92.1 FM) formerly licensed to serve Tusayan, Arizona, United States
