= KWSS =

KWSS may refer to:

- KWSS-LP, a low-power radio station (93.9 FM) licensed to Scottsdale, Arizona, United States
- KFAT (defunct), a defunct radio station (94.5 FM) later known as KWSS
