= KMGN =

Coordinates: 34.969°N 111.508°W

- Flagstaff, Arizona; United States
- Broadcast area: Flagstaff-Prescott, Arizona
- Frequency: 93.9 MHz
- Branding: 93.9 The Mountain

Programming
- Format: Mainstream rock
- Affiliations: United Stations Radio Networks

Ownership
- Owner: Roger and Nancy Anderson; (Flagstaff Radio, Inc.)
- Sister stations: KAFF, KAFF-FM, KFSZ, KNOT, KTMG

History
- First air date: 1975 (as KCTB-FM)
- Former call signs: KCTB-FM (1975–1982); KSOJ (1982–1986)
- Call sign meaning: MaGic of the Northland (former name)

Technical information
- Licensing authority: FCC
- Facility ID: 49688
- Class: C
- ERP: 100,000 watts
- HAAT: 460 meters (1,510 ft)

Links
- Public license information: Public file; LMS
- Webcast: Listen Live
- Website: 939themountain.gcmaz.com

KMGN (93.9 FM) is an American commercial mainstream rock music radio station in Flagstaff, Arizona, United States, broadcasting to the Flagstaff–Prescott, Arizona area.

== History ==
KCTB-FM signed on in 1975. It was owned by and named for Christian Towers Broadcasting. In 1982, it became KSOJ, the "Sound of Joy", when Tucson-based Harvest Ministries acquired it.

93.9 FM relaunched as KMGN in 1986, originally airing an adult contemporary music format, punctuated by the "Ott & Scott in the Morning" radio show, a morning drive radio show hosted by radio personality Don Scott and news director Kimberly Ott. The station also served as the flagship for Northern Arizona University athletics for a number of years after the closure of KCLS in 1988.

Upon being purchased by Guyann Corporation in 1994, the station flipped to the classic rock format that still airs today. In March 2013 KMGN shifted to a mainstream rock format. The station, along with four sister stations, was sold to Roger and Nancy Anderson's Flagstaff Radio, Inc. The transaction, at a purchase price of $5 million, was consummated on July 2, 2014.
