= KTNN =

Navajo and country music radio station in Window Rock, Arizona

KTNN and KTNN-FM

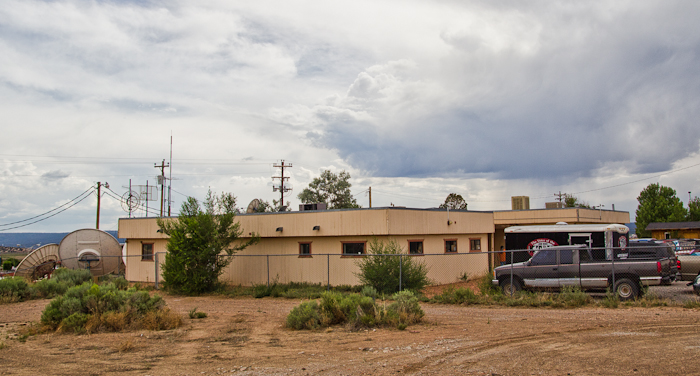
- KTNN's headquarters in Window Rock, Arizona

KTNN: Window Rock, Arizona; KTNN-FM: Tohatchi, New Mexico; United States
- Frequencies: KTNN: 660 kHz; KTNN-FM: 101.5 MHz
- Branding: The Voice of the Navajo Nation

Programming
- Language(s): Navajo and English
- Format: Country music; Classic hits; Navajo cultural programming

Ownership
- Owner: The Navajo Nation
- Sister stations: KWRK/KCAZ, NNTV5

History
- First air date: KTNN: February 26, 1986; KTNN-FM: 2015
- Call sign meaning: The Navajo Nation

Technical information
- Licensing authority: FCC
- Facility ID: KTNN: 66146; KTNN-FM: 191366
- Class: KTNN: B; KTNN-FM: C2
- Power: KTNN: 50,000 watts
- ERP: KTNN-FM: 2,250 watts
- HAAT: KTNN-FM: 595 meters (1,952 ft)
- Transmitter coordinates: KTNN: 35°53′42.04″N 109°8′31.35″W; KTNN-FM: 35°54′37.1″N 108°46′28.3″W

Links
- Public license information: KTNN: Public file; LMS; KTNN-FM: Public file; LMS
- Webcast: Listen live
- Website: ktnnonline.com

KTNN (660 AM) is a Navajo language radio station licensed to Window Rock, Arizona, United States, the seat of the government of the Navajo Nation. It broadcasts Navajo tribal music and audio from Navajo ceremonial (powwow) dances and Native American music, as well as country music and bluegrass in English. It also broadcasts high school basketball games from the local high schools on the Navajo Reservation. Most of its announcers are bilingual and broadcast in Navajo and English.

At the time the station came on the air in 1986, it claimed to be the last station allowed to go on the air with a full 50,000 watts on another station's clear channel frequency; however, other stations have been allowed since.

At night the station uses a directional antenna to protect, as required by Federal Communications Commission (FCC) rules, the signal of WFAN at New York City, since WFAN is a Class A (formerly Class I-A) station broadcasting on 660 kHz and KTNN is Class B (formerly Class II-A). Its programming is also heard on KTNN-FM (101.5 FM) in Tohatchi, New Mexico.

== See also ==
- List of radio stations in Arizona
