= KFSZ =

Radio station in Munds Park, Arizona

- Munds Park, Arizona; United States
- Broadcast area: Flagstaff, Arizona
- Frequency: 106.1 MHz
- Branding: Hits 106

Programming
- Language: English
- Format: Top 40 (CHR)
- Affiliations: Compass Media Networks; Premiere Networks

Ownership
- Owner: Roger and Nancy Anderson; (Southwest Media, Inc.)
- Sister stations: KAFF, KAFF-FM, KMGN, KNOT, KTMG

History
- First air date: 2008

Technical information
- Licensing authority: FCC
- Facility ID: 164209
- Class: C2
- ERP: 4,300 watts
- HAAT: 468 meters (1,535 ft)
- Transmitter coordinates: 34°58′06″N 111°30′29″W

Links
- Public license information: Public file; LMS
- Webcast: Listen Live
- Website: website

KFSZ (106.1 FM, "Hits 106") is an American radio station licensed to serve the community of Munds Park, Arizona. The station, established in 2008, is owned by Roger and Nancy Anderson, through licensee Southwest Media, Inc.

== Programming ==
Former branding (2008–2011)

As of November 12, 2011, KFSZ broadcasts a contemporary hit radio music format branded as "Hits 106" to the greater Flagstaff, Arizona, area. Before that date, it aired a hot adult contemporary music format branded as "My 106.1" and "Magic 106.1".

== History ==
This station received its original construction permit for a new FM station broadcasting at 106.1 MHz from the Federal Communications Commission (FCC) on February 23, 2005. The new station was assigned the "KFSZ" call sign by the FCC on March 17, 2006.

Nearly four years after the original construction permit was granted, KFSZ received its license to cover from the FCC on February 13, 2009.

== Ownership ==
In February 2008, LKCM Radio Group, LP (Kevin Prigel, VP/secretary) announced an agreement to sell KFSZ, then still under construction, to OD Broadcasting, LLC (Michael O'Donnell, president) for a reported $2.35 million in cash. The FCC approved the deal on April 18, 2008, but as of November 12, 2011 the transaction was not consummated. Effective July 31, 2015, KFSZ was sold by LKCM Radio Group to Roger and Nancy Anderson's Southwest Media, Inc., at a purchase price of $491,400.
