= KSCW-LP =

Coordinates: 36.208°N 105.901°W

- Sun City West, Arizona; United States
- Broadcast area: Sun City West, Arizona, Sun City, Arizona
- Frequency: 103.1 MHz
- Branding: 103.1 KSCW

Programming
- Format: Community radio

Ownership
- Owner: Recreation Centers of Sun City West, Inc.

History
- Call sign meaning: Sun City West

Technical information
- Licensing authority: FCC
- Class: L1
- ERP: 100 watts
- HAAT: -21.7 meters

Links
- Public license information: LMS
- Website: suncitywestradio.com

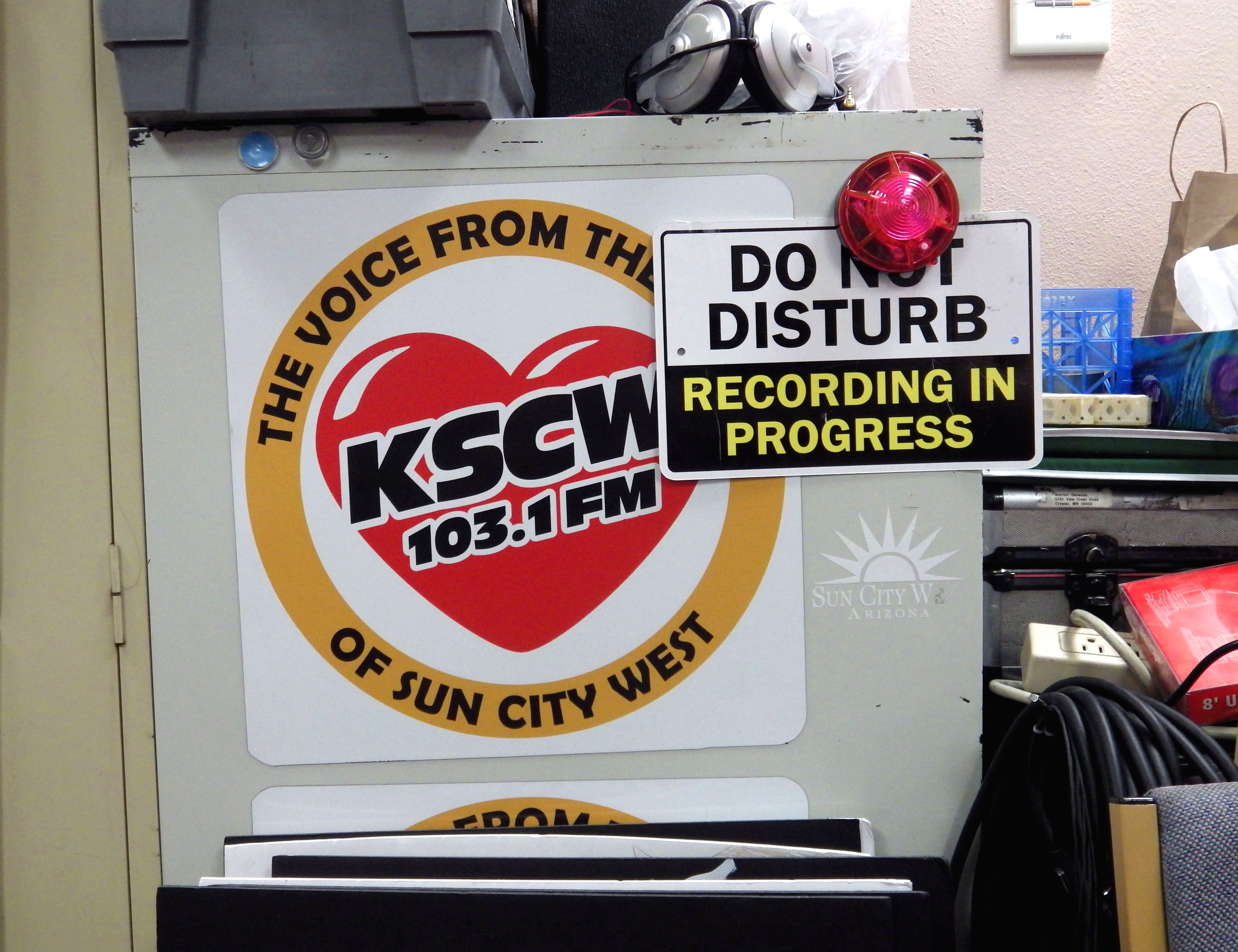

KSCW-LP is a low-power radio station ("103.1 on your FM dial") located in Sun City West, Arizona. KSCW's license is owned by Recreation Centers of Sun City West, Inc., and the station is run entirely by a volunteer staff (through the Sun City West Broadcast Club) and is funded primarily through fundraisers. KSCW features a wide variety of programming.

== History ==
In 2013, the Sun City West Broadcast Club was chartered by the Recreation Centers of Sun City West. In 2014, the club obtained an LPFM license. A 52-foot (16 m) antenna was erected outside the station on June 18, 2015, while the station began broadcasting online that fall.

== See also ==
- List of radio stations in Arizona
