= KOHN =

Radio station of the Tohono O'odham Nation in Sells, Arizona

- Sells, Arizona; United States
- Frequency: 91.9 MHz
- Branding: Hewel Ñi'ok

Programming
- Format: Community
- Affiliations: Native Voice One

Ownership
- Owner: Tohono O'odham Nation

History
- First air date: 2000
- Call sign meaning: O’odham Hewel Ñi’ok

Technical information
- Licensing authority: FCC
- Facility ID: 122603
- Class: C1
- ERP: 10,000 watts
- HAAT: 505 meters (1657 feet)
- Transmitter coordinates: 32°07′59″N 112°09′31″W

Links
- Public license information: Public file; LMS
- Webcast: tunein.com/radio/KOHN-FM-919-s139631/
- Website: www.tonation-nsn.gov/administrative-offices/hewel_niok/

KOHN (91.9 FM) is a radio station licensed to serve Sells, Arizona, United States. The station is owned by the Tohono O'odham Nation. It airs a Community radio format.

The station was assigned the KOHN call letters by the Federal Communications Commission on December 14, 2000. KOHN began Internet streaming on June 1, 2011.

KOHN is relayed on KOHH 90.7 in San Lucy, Arizona. The Tohono O'odham Nation also operates low-power stations in Florence Community (KOHF-LP 101.1) and San Xavier (KWAK-LP 102.5).

== See also ==
- List of community radio stations in the United States
