= KTMG =

- Prescott, Arizona; United States
- Broadcast area: Prescott, Arizona
- Frequency: 99.1 MHz (HD Radio)
- Branding: Magic 99.1

Programming
- Language: English
- Format: Adult contemporary
- Subchannels: HD2: Oldies (KNOT simulcast)
- Affiliations: Premiere Networks

Ownership
- Owner: Roger and Nancy Anderson; (Flagstaff Radio, Inc.)
- Sister stations: KAFF, KAFF-FM, KFSZ, KMGN, KNOT

History
- First air date: 1978 (as KNOT-FM at 98.3)
- Former call signs: KNOT-FM (1978–2005)
- Former frequencies: 98.3 MHz (1978–1993)

Technical information
- Licensing authority: FCC
- Facility ID: 52001
- Class: A
- ERP: 6,000 watts
- HAAT: 61 meters (200 ft)
- Transmitter coordinates: 34°34′29″N 112°28′45″W

Links
- Public license information: Public file; LMS
- Webcast: Listen Live
- Website: KTMG Online

KTMG (99.1 FM, "Magic 99.1") is an American commercial adult contemporary music radio station in Prescott, Arizona, broadcasting to the Prescott, Arizona, area. It Flips to Christmas Music on November & December

== History ==
KNOT-FM signed on 98.3 MHz in 1978 after a multi-year fight between Parkell Broadcasting, which built the station, and Southwest Broadcasting Company, which sought to have it denied. Payne-Prescott Broadcasting Company bought KNOT-FM in 1981 and moved it to 99.1 in 1993.
