= KTLO (AM) =

- Mountain Home, Arkansas; United States
- Frequency: 1240 kHz
- Branding: Real Talk KTLO

Programming
- Format: Conservative talk
- Affiliations: Fox News Radio; Westwood One

Ownership
- Owner: Mountain Lakes Broadcasting Corp.
- Sister stations: KBOD, KCTT-FM, KTLO-FM

History
- First air date: 1953
- Call sign meaning: "Twin Lakes of the Ozarks"

Technical information
- Licensing authority: FCC
- Facility ID: 35672
- Class: C
- Power: 830 watts
- Transmitter coordinates: 36°21′23″N 92°21′34″W

Links
- Public license information: Public file; LMS
- Website: www.ktlo.com/ktloam/

KTLO (1240 kHz) is an AM radio station licensed to Mountain Home, Arkansas. The station broadcasts a conservative talk format and is owned by Mountain Lakes Broadcasting Corp.

Previois logo
