= KJKJ (Arizona) =

Radio station in Flagstaff, Arizona (1962–1964)

KJKJ was a radio station on 1400 AM in Flagstaff, Arizona, that operated between 1962 and 1964.

== History ==
KJKJ was started by Joseph E. Patrick and Joseph A. Brandt of Dateline Broadcasters. The two men worked at KRUX in Phoenix. The station signed on November 2, 1962, broadcasting with 250 watts.

During its short life on air, KJKJ made national news on one occasion. In May 1963, Jack Hughes and Robert Polk began a marathon broadcast that would turn out to be 93 hours and 35 minutes long, setting a then-National Association of Broadcasters record.

KJKJ's signing on gave Flagstaff an unprecedented five operating radio stations. In mid-1963, KFGT at 930 AM, which had come to air on October 15, 1962, was sold; it would be silent for months until returning as KAFF (AM) that fall. In August 1963, the original KVNA at 690 kHz folded, which with KAFF returning to the air brought the count down to four. However, the station would soon fall into a mire of ownership and financial troubles. In late March 1964, KJKJ was sold to Charles and Rosemary Foster for $44,500 in a transaction that would never be consummated. The next month, Coconino County filed a federal tax lien of $2,150 against Dateline for withholding tax and other taxes. The station went off the air late in 1964; on January 4, 1965—with Dateline having fallen behind on rent to The Arizona Bank, from which it leased studio space—the bank proceeded to hold a public auction for studio and office equipment.

In September 1965, the Coconino County Superior Court appointed a receiver, Lloyd Young, in order to resolve an ownership dispute between Dateline and the Fosters; Young quickly filed the station's license renewal. On August 9, 1966, Young filed to sell KJKJ out of bankruptcy to Radio Albuquerque, Inc. for $24,000, but the sale never materialized, and the station would not return to air.

Its license was deleted on August 16, 1967.
