= KTLO-FM =

Radio station in Mountain Home, Arkansas

- Mountain Home, Arkansas; United States
- Frequency: 97.9 MHz
- Branding: KTLO 97.9 FM

Programming
- Format: Adult standards
- Affiliations: ABC News Radio; America's Best Music (Westwood One)

Ownership
- Owner: Mountain Lakes Broadcasting Corp.
- Sister stations: KTLO, KBOD, KCTT-FM

History
- First air date: January 11, 1971
- Former frequencies: 98.3 MHz (1971–1996)
- Call sign meaning: Twin Lakes of the Ozarks (from AM)

Technical information
- Licensing authority: FCC
- Facility ID: 35672
- Class: C2
- ERP: 30,000 watts
- HAAT: 194 meters (636 ft)
- Transmitter coordinates: 36°20′55″N 92°24′00″W

Links
- Public license information: Public file; LMS
- Webcast: Listen live
- Website: www.ktlo.com/ktlofm/

KTLO-FM (97.9 MHz) is a radio station licensed to Mountain Home, Arkansas. The station broadcasts an adult standards format and is owned by Mountain Lakes Broadcasting Corp.

== History ==
On January 7, 1969, Mountain Home Broadcasting Corporation, the owner of KTLO (1240 AM), filed with the Federal Communications Commission to build a new FM radio station in Mountain Home. The construction permit was granted on July 1, 1970, and KTLO-FM began broadcasting at 98.3 MHz on January 11, 1971. $30,000 in new equipment was installed at the KTLO studios on Highway 5 to prepare for the launch of the stereo outlet. KTLO-FM broadcast from a hilltop tower located west of the studios and AM transmitter site. Early FM programming was in a block format, with contemporary and country music interspersed with news features. KTLO-AM-FM was sold in 1975 to four new investors for $400,000.

By the mid-1980s, KTLO had settled into a middle-of-the-road music format known as "Stardust 98". The 1990s saw ownership and technical changes for KTLO-FM. The former began with a $775,000 sale of KTLO-AM-FM to Charles and Scottie Earls in late 1994. The Earls oversaw a major technical overhaul for the FM outlet: in 1996, it increased its power to 50,000 watts and relocated to 97.9 MHz from a transmitter on Crystal Mountain, with the programming remaining the same. The Earls divested their remaining shares in KTLO-AM-FM and KCTT-FM 101.7 to the Ward and Knight families in 2010 in a transaction that gave the Earls full control of KOMC-FM and KRZK in Branson, Missouri; the two families had previously been minority owners in Mountain Lakes.

Among KTLO-FM's regular programs is Talk of the Town, an interview show. Talk of the Town had previously been hosted by Brenda Nelson, who retired after 34 years on air in 2009 after airing some 8,000 interviews.
