= KHAC =

- Tse Bonito, New Mexico; United States
- Frequency: 880 kHz

Programming
- Format: Native American religion

Ownership
- Owner: Across Nations
- Sister stations: KWIM, KTBA

Technical information
- Licensing authority: FCC
- Facility ID: 71796
- Class: B
- Power: 10,000 watts day 430 watts night
- Transmitter coordinates: 35°38′41″N 109°1′13″W
- Translator: (96.7 MHz) K244FY (Window Rock, AZ)

Links
- Public license information: Public file; LMS
- Website: KHAC website

KHAC (880 AM) is a radio station broadcasting a Native American religious format that is licensed to Tse Bonito, New Mexico, United States. The station is currently owned by Across Nations.

When it first came on the air in 1967 KHAC was on 1300 kHz as a daytimer. It moved to 1110 kHz in 1979 and moved to 880 kHz in 1989.
