= Kaffe (disambiguation) =

Kaffe is a clean room design of a Java Virtual Machine.

Kaffe may also refer to:

- Kaffe (band), Bulgarian jazz band
- Kaffe Fassett, American-born artist known for colourful designs
- Kaffe (band), Bulgarian jazz band
- Kaffe Matthews, British electronic composer and sound artist
- A political ward of Gada, Nigeria

== See also ==
- KAFF (disambiguation)
