= KATO (AM) =

Radio station in Safford, Arizona

- Safford, Arizona; United States
- Broadcast area: Safford, Arizona
- Frequency: 1230 kHz
- Branding: Newstalk 1230

Programming
- Format: News Talk Information
- Affiliations: Westwood One, ESPN Radio

Ownership
- Owner: Reed Richins; (Double-R-Communications LLC)
- Sister stations: KWRQ, KXKQ

History
- First air date: May 5, 1961

Technical information
- Licensing authority: FCC
- Facility ID: 40914
- Class: C
- Power: 1,000 watts unlimited
- Transmitter coordinates: 32°49′46″N 109°45′16″W

Links
- Public license information: Public file; LMS
- Website: gilavalleycentral.net

KATO (1230 AM) is a radio station broadcasting a News Talk Information format. Licensed to Safford, Arizona, United States, the station is currently owned by Reed Richins, through licensee Double-R-Communications LLC, and features programming from Westwood One and ESPN Radio.

KATO carries local high school sports and Eastern Arizona College football and basketball. The "voice" of Gila Valley sports is Lee Patterson, who has been on the mic at KATO since 2000.

== History ==
KATO was built and signed on by veteran eastern Arizona radio station owner Willard Shoecraft. When it came on air on May 5, 1961, it restored radio service to Safford, which had been lost on October 29, 1960, when the Safford-based Gila Broadcasting chain—and its local station KGLU—shuttered operations in the face of a pending FCC license revocation hearing. Shoecraft had started his radio career in 1939 at KGLU, working 70 hours a week for $10 pay. KATO's initial studios and offices were in the Town House Motor Hotel. Shoecraft sold KATO in 1968 to Al G. Stanley, who was able to raise its power to 1,000 watts in 1971. KSIL, Inc., bought KATO in 1973.

In the late 1980s and early 1990s, KATO went through a revolving door of owners. The McQuade family bought KATO in 1988 and sold it to Harry McMurray, who in turn sold it on to a group headed by Rex Jensen in 1990. When that group filed for bankruptcy, McMurray bought back the station. Double-R Communications acquired KATO and its sister stations in 2018.
