= KJIK =

- Duncan, Arizona; United States
- Broadcast area: Safford, Arizona
- Frequency: 100.7 MHz
- Branding: Majik 100.7

Programming
- Format: Variety

Ownership
- Owner: WSK Family Credit Shelter Trust UTA
- Sister stations: KQAZ, KRVZ, KTHQ

History
- Former call signs: KSAF
- Call sign meaning: MAJIK

Technical information
- Licensing authority: FCC
- Facility ID: 78307
- Class: C1
- ERP: 10,000 watts
- HAAT: 716 meters (2349 feet) .
- Transmitter coordinates: 32°53′21″N 109°19′20″W

Links
- Public license information: Public file; LMS
- Website: kjik.fm

KJIK (100.7 FM, "Majik 100.7") is a radio station licensed to serve Duncan/Safford and Eastern Arizona, United States. The station is owned by WSK Family Credit Shelter Trust UTA. It airs a variety music format.

The station was assigned the KJIK call letters by the Federal Communications Commission on February 6, 2003.
