= KBSZ =

Radio station in Apache Junction, Arizona, United States

- Apache Junction, Arizona; United States
- Broadcast area: East Valley (Phoenix metropolitan area)
- Frequency: 1260 kHz
- Branding: 97.3/1260 The Buzz

Programming
- Format: Urban adult contemporary

Ownership
- Owner: WOOK Radio DC, Inc.

History
- First air date: January 27, 1968
- Former call signs: KSWW (1968–1981); KUUK (1981–1987); KCIW (1987–1989); KTIM (1989–1996)
- Former frequencies: 1250 kHz (1968–2007)

Technical information
- Licensing authority: FCC
- Facility ID: 11217
- Class: D
- Power: 4,500 watts (day); 50 watts (night)
- Transmitter coordinates: 33°22′56″N 111°32′9″W
- Translator: 97.3 K247CF (Payson)

Links
- Public license information: Public file; LMS

KBSZ (1260 AM; "The Buzz") is a commercial radio station licensed to Apache Junction, Arizona, United States, and broadcasting an urban adult contemporary format. Owned by WOOK Radio DC, Inc., the station's studios and offices are located in Miami, Arizona, while the transmitter is sited in Apache Junction. Programming is also heard on 250-watt FM translator K247CF at 97.3 MHz in Payson.

== History ==
=== In Wickenburg ===
The Wickenburg Radio Company received a construction permit for a new radio station in Wickenburg, Arizona, on October 25, 1967, and which took to the air on January 27, 1968. KSWW broadcast as a 500-watt station during the daytime at 1250 kHz. The majority stockholder was W. Schuyler Thurber, a former department store owner.

KSWW was the second attempt to build a radio station on the frequency in Wickenburg. The first was KAKA, which had signed on August 28, 1960. It was owned by Mamie Gander and Paul Mullenix; Lowell F. Beer bought out Gander in 1962. However, KAKA and short-lived sister station KTPM in Sun City went into receivership and were shuttered in 1963; its license was deleted on November 8, 1965.

Thurber's share in KSWW was bought in 1972 by Joyce Stirling, but it went bankrupt in December 1979 and was silent for 16 months. Lee Shoblom bought the silent KSWW for $80,000 and returned it to air on March 11, 1981, as country music station KUUK. Shoblom lost out on its first attempt to acquire an FM counterpart to KUUK in 1982 when Hassayampa Broadcasting was awarded the permit. However, the two stations would eventually be united. In 1983, Shoblom sold KUUK to the Wickenburg Broadcasting Company, and two years later, the same principals acquired the FM permit. On January 1, 1987, the FM station launched, and the two stations became KCIW-AM-FM with a country music format. Kenyon Communications bought the stations in 1988; upon the occasion of an FM power increase to 50,000 watts, on August 2, 1989, the two stations changed to a big-band format as KTIM-AM-FM.

Interstate Broadcasting Systems of Arizona acquired both stations in the fall of 1990, but the acquisition was primarily for KTIM-FM, which Interstate planned to use as an FM counterpart to its KRDS (1190 AM). On November 27, 1990, KTIM-FM became KRDS-FM (today's KQBU-FM). With no plans to keep the AM station, Interstate sold it to Circle S Broadcasting, owned by Harold Shumway. Shumway renovated a former Big W restaurant to serve as station offices. Shumway then obtained an FM construction permit for Wickenburg on 93.7 MHz and signed it on as KFMA in 1992.

On March 1, 1996, KTIM became KBSZ, call letters then in use by the sister FM station; soon after, however, the FM flipped to country music as KSWG. The next year, Circle S sold KBSZ to SBD Broadcasting; four years later, SBD sold the station to Richard (Pete) and Joann Peterson. The Petersons relaunched the station with entirely local programming, including Wickenburg High School football games.

=== In Apache Junction ===
On November 7, 2007, the Petersons filed to move KBSZ's transmitter and city of license from Wickenburg (about 60 miles (97 km) northwest of downtown Phoenix) to Apache Junction (35 miles (56 km) east of downtown Phoenix), accompanied by a frequency change to 1260 kHz on the AM dial. A month later, the station was sold to 1TV.com, Inc., owned by John Low.

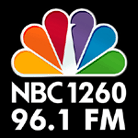
KBSZ logo as "NBC 1260"

In 2010, KBSZ signed on from its new Apache Junction location with a classic hits and oldies format targeting the residents of Apache Junction and adjacent communities. It was the first radio station on the frequency in Pinal County since KFAS in Casa Grande signed off in the mid-1990s. After only four months, the station adopted a talk format as "NBC 1260" on September 7; by 2013, the branding had shifted to "NewsTalk 1260 & 96.1", reflecting translator station K241BQ (96.1 FM) in Fort McDowell.

KBSZ switched to an all-comedy format, initially as a simulcast of KIKO-FM, on April 1, 2013. The station used a syndicated comedy programming service known as "24/7 Comedy". When it ceased operations in 2014, KBSZ–by then no longer simulcasting with KIKO-FM–wanted to keep its comedy format, so it switched programming to "Today's Comedy".

Around July 1, 2019, KBSZ fell silent without any explanation. On July 8, 2019, they posted a message on their website that they had ceased broadcasting the comedy format "due to circumstances beyond our control", and that they would be simulcasting sister station KIKO-FM's oldies format. After nearly two weeks of broadcasting with dead air, KBSZ returned to the air with a classic rock format named "The Rattler".

KBSZ, along with translator K247CF (97.3 FM), were sold in July 2023 to WOOK Radio DC, headed by William Tucker Jr., for $850,000. By 2025, KBSZ switched to an urban adult contemporary format.

== Translator ==
KBSZ's reach is extended by the following low-power FM translator:

Broadcast translator for KBSZ
Call sign	Frequency	City of license	FID	ERP (W)	HAAT	Class	Transmitter coordinates	FCC info
K247CF	97.3 FM	Payson, Arizona	144136	99	491 m (1,611 ft)	D	33°19′57.2″N 112°3′51″W	LMS
