= KZUL-FM =

- Lake Havasu City, Arizona; United States
- Frequency: 104.5 MHz
- Branding: Casual FM

Programming
- Format: Adult contemporary

Ownership
- Owner: Murphy Broadcasting; (Mad Dog Wireless, Inc.)
- Sister stations: KADD, KFTT, KRCY-FM, KRRK, KGZL-FM,

History
- First air date: 1989
- Former call signs: KNDD (1984–1986)
- Call sign meaning: "Casual"

Technical information
- Licensing authority: FCC
- Facility ID: 39562
- Class: C3
- ERP: 230 watts
- HAAT: 814 meters (2671 feet)
- Transmitter coordinates: 34°33′06″N 114°11′37″W
- Translators: 95.3 K237CK (Riviera); 95.9 K240BO (Kingman); 98.7 K254CE (Lake Havasu City)

Links
- Public license information: Public file; LMS
- Website: KZUL Online

KZUL-FM (104.5 FM, "Kazual FM") is a radio station licensed to serve Lake Havasu City, Arizona, United States. The station is owned by Murphy Broadcasting and licensed to Mad Dog Wireless, Inc. It airs an Adult Contemporary music format.

The station was assigned the KZUL-FM call letters by the Federal Communications Commission on May 23, 1986.

== Translators ==
Broadcast translators for KZUL-FM
Call sign	Frequency	City of license	FID	ERP (W)	HAAT	Class	FCC info
K237CK	95.3 FM	Riviera, Arizona	965	155	679 m (2,228 ft)	D	LMS
K240BO	95.9 FM	Kingman, Arizona	54319	82	876 m (2,874 ft)	D	LMS
K254CE	98.7 FM	Lake Havasu City, Arizona	156420	100	0 m (0 ft)	D	LMS
