= KPUB =

Public radio station in Flagstaff, Arizona, United States

- Flagstaff, Arizona; United States
- Broadcast area: Flagstaff, Arizona
- Frequency: 91.7 MHz
- Branding: Arizona Public Radio

Programming
- Format: News Talk Information
- Affiliations: National Public Radio, Public Radio International

Ownership
- Owner: Northern Arizona University
- Sister stations: KNAU

History
- First air date: 2001

Technical information
- Licensing authority: FCC
- Facility ID: 49510
- Class: C3
- ERP: 500 watts
- HAAT: 560 meters (1,840 ft)
- Transmitter coordinates: 35°14′34″N 111°36′40″W
- Translators: 102.7 K274AY (Page); 103.3 K277AR (Cottonwood)
- Repeaters: 89.3 KNAQ (Prescott); 90.3 KNAG (Grand Canyon); 91.7 KNAD (Page)

Links
- Public license information: Public file; LMS
- Webcast: Listen Live
- Website: knau.org

KPUB (91.7 FM) is a radio station broadcasting a News Talk Information format. Licensed to Flagstaff, Arizona, United States, it serves the Flagstaff area. The station is owned by Northern Arizona University and features programming from National Public Radio and Public Radio International.

The station signed on in 2001. It airs an extended schedule of NPR news and talk, including programs that had not previously aired in northern Arizona. KPUB acts as a complement to the area's flagship NPR station, KNAU, which airs a mix of NPR news and classical music.
