= KCMA-LP =

Low-power radio station in Payson, Arizona

- Payson, Arizona; United States
- Frequency: 92.1 MHz

Programming
- Format: Defunct (formerly Classic Hits)
- Affiliations: USA Radio Network

Ownership
- Owner: Payson Classical Music Association, Inc.

History
- First air date: November 20, 2003
- Last air date: June 29, 2021
- Former frequencies: 98.5 MHz (2004–2016)
- Call sign meaning: K Classical Music Association

Technical information
- Licensing authority: FCC
- Facility ID: 134141
- Class: L1
- ERP: 8 watts
- HAAT: 85 meters
- Transmitter coordinates: 34°13′47″N 111°20′47″W

Links
- Public license information: LMS

KCMA-LP (92.1 FM) was a nonprofit, listener-supported radio station licensed to serve Payson, Arizona. The station was owned by Payson Classical Music Appreciation Inc. It aired a Classic Hits format that the station described as "musical favorites from the '50s, '60s and '70s". In addition to its usual music programming, KCMA-LP aired news programming from the USA Radio Network.

The station was assigned the KCMA-LP call letters by the Federal Communications Commission on June 24, 2002.

Payson Classic Music Appreciation surrendered KCMA-LP's license to the FCC on June 29, 2021, who cancelled it the same day.

== See also ==
- List of community radio stations in the United States
