= KSOM (Arizona) =

Radio station in Tucson, Arizona (1962–1966)

- Tucson, Arizona; United States
- Frequency: 92.1 MHz

Ownership
- Owner: Stanley Prell; (Prell Enterprises)

History
- First air date: March 12, 1962
- Last air date: February 15, 1966 (license renewal dismissed)
- Call sign meaning: "Sound of Music"

Technical information
- ERP: 3,000 watts

KSOM was an FM radio station at 92.1 MHz in Tucson, Arizona, operating between 1962 and 1965. The station was known as the "Sound of Music" with a classical music format.

== History ==
After filing for its construction permit on July 17, 1961, KSOM went on the air March 12, 1962, from studios and transmitter at 2126 S. Alvernon Way in Tucson, broadcasting 12 hours a day. It broadcast classical music; the licensee was Prell Enterprises, owned by Stan Prell and his father, Isador. KSOM claimed the distinction of being the first stereo FM station in southern Arizona. The station also formed a pact with KEPI in Phoenix to form the "Arizona FM Stereo Network", with combined news programming.

On the night of May 4, 1963, David Paladin, the station's program director, was anchoring a late newscast at about 11:45 p.m. when he noticed a "big blanket of smoke" drift into the studio. After asking listeners to call the fire department, he signed the station off and fled the building; he was later treated for smoke inhalation. While the fire did not damage the studios, the transmitter exhaust system took in smoke and damaged the equipment, causing an estimated $35,000 in damage and taking KSOM off the air. After the fire, KSOM rebuilt its studios in the Mayer-Alameda building at 110 E. Alameda. The new studio was furnished with Schafer automation equipment, the second such installation in Arizona, which was put into service on July 22, 1963.

While the transmitter remained at the former Alvernon studio site, KSOM sought to improve its coverage. In November 1964, the FCC granted a construction permit to move to 92.9 FM and change station classes from A to C, with 38,000 watts of effective radiated power; these facilities were never built. KSOM operated through most of 1965, though it suffered two thefts at its Alvernon Way transmitter facility, with tape recorders stolen in May and September. In a separate May incident, a fire destroyed $3,500 of equipment in KSOM's transmitter room.

On February 15, 1966, the Federal Communications Commission dismissed KSOM's license renewal application for failure to prosecute.
