= KRVZ =

- Springerville, Arizona; United States
- Broadcast area: White Mountains
- Frequency: 1400 kHz
- Branding: Round Valley's Own "Cowboy Country Radio"

Programming
- Format: Classic Country
- Affiliations: Talk Radio Network

Ownership
- Owner: William and Mary Ann Konopnicki; (WSK Family Credit Shelter Trust UTA)
- Sister stations: KJIK, KQAZ, KTHQ

Technical information
- Licensing authority: FCC
- Facility ID: 17390
- Class: C
- Power: 1,000 watts
- Transmitter coordinates: 34°8′17″N 109°16′15″W

Links
- Public license information: Public file; LMS

KRVZ (1400 AM) is a radio station broadcasting a News Talk Information format. Licensed to Springerville, Arizona, United States, the station is currently owned by William and Mary Ann Konopnicki through licensee WSK Family Credit Shelter Trust UTA, and features programming from Talk Radio Network.
