= KAHM =

Music radio station in Prescott, Arizona

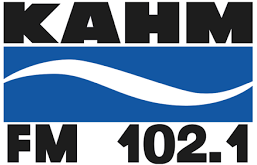
- Spring Valley, Arizona; United States
- Broadcast area: Prescott–Flagstaff–Phoenix
- Frequency: 102.1 MHz
- Branding: FM 102.1

Programming
- Format: Beautiful music - easy listening
- Affiliations: SRN News

Ownership
- Owner: Farmworker Educational Radio Network (Cesar Chavez Foundation); (Phoenix Radio Broadcasting, LLC)
- Operator: Prescott Broadcasting, LLC
- Sister stations: KYCA

History
- First air date: September 9, 1981
- Former frequencies: 103.9 MHz (1980s)
- Call sign meaning: Phonetically pronounced as "calm"

Technical information
- Licensing authority: FCC
- Facility ID: 61510
- Class: C
- ERP: 58,000 watts
- HAAT: 770 meters (2,530 ft)
- Transmitter coordinates: 34°41′14″N 112°07′1″W
- Translators: 93.5 K228DF (Prescott); 101.7 K269EE (Prescott)

Links
- Public license information: Public file; LMS
- Website: kahm.info

KAHM (102.1 FM) is a commercial radio station licensed to Spring Valley, Arizona, and serving the Prescott, Flagstaff and Phoenix region with a beautiful music and easy listening format. KAHM's studios are on Henry Street in Prescott, while the transmitter is located on Mingus Mountain near Cottonwood.

== History ==
KAHM signed on the air on September 9, 1981. It provides the Prescott, Flagstaff and Phoenix areas with a format of Beautiful Music, which remains virtually unchanged. The station originally aired quarter hour sweeps of easy listening music, mostly instrumental cover versions of popular adult songs, with some Broadway and Hollywood show tunes. In the 2000s, it moved to a 50% vocal playlist.

First broadcasting under 1,000 watts, KAHM's signal expanded in the early 1990s to 58,000 watts, serving the people of northern and central Arizona, along with the metropolitan Phoenix market. With the improved signal, KAHM could be heard in southern Arizona as far south as Peoria, Scottsdale and Anthem. In 2005, the station began broadcasting 24 hours a day, using broadcast automation overnight.

From the early 2000s until September 14, 2015, KAHM also had an Internet stream on its website. The stream was ended due to high demand on the server and due to licensing fees. As of 2023, the internet stream has returned.

Effective January 12, 2018, Southwest Broadcasting sold KAHM (as well as translator K269EE and sister talk KYCA and its translator K278CN) to Phoenix Radio Broadcasting, a holding company for the Cesar Chavez Foundation's Farmworker Educational Radio Network. Southwest Broadcasting management, reorganized as Prescott Broadcasting, LLC, still operates the station under a local marketing agreement and has continued its easy listening format, which is one of only a handful of broadcast stations still airing the format in the United States since its decline in the 1980s (the station claims "We've always been Calm, and we always will be"). The KYCA license was sold back to Prescott Broadcasting in 2021.

KAHM has a construction permit to move to a new tower location in Crown King. With the taller tower, the power will drop from 54,000 watts to 26,000 watts. In preparation for this move, the station has changed its city of license from Prescott to Spring Valley.

== Translators ==
Broadcast translators for KAHM
Call sign	Frequency	City of license	FID	ERP (W)	Class	FCC info
K228DF	93.5 FM	Prescott, Arizona	20633	250	D	LMS
K269EE	101.7 FM	Prescott, Arizona	61511	84	D	LMS

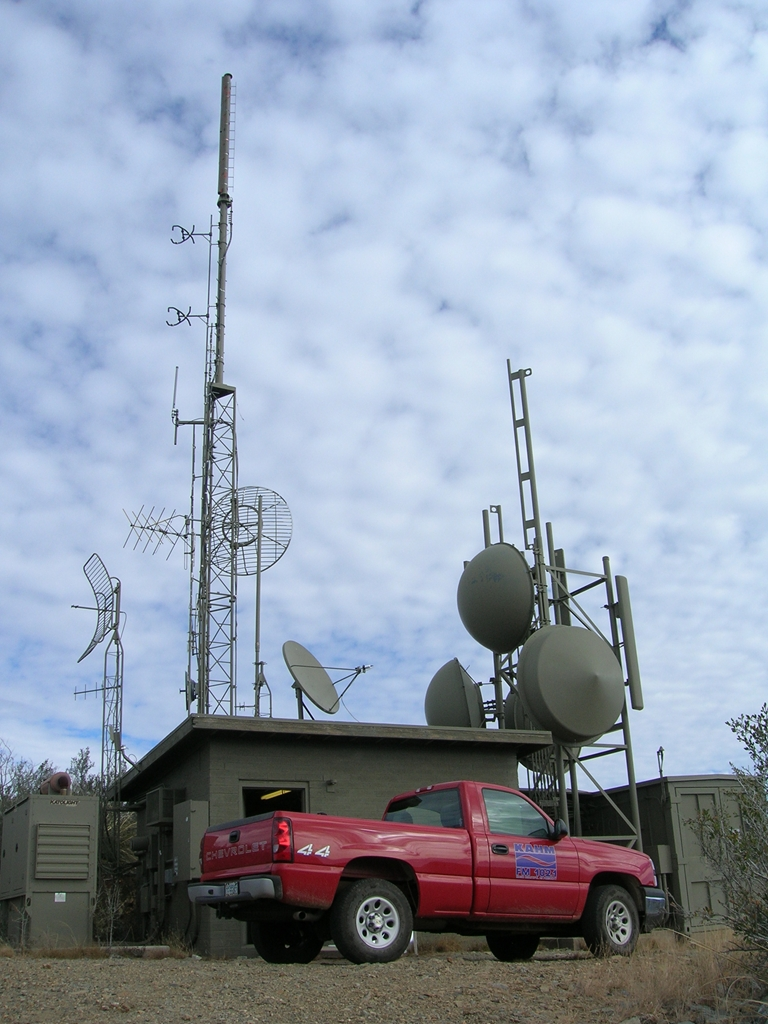
2007 Photo of translator K269EE 101.7FM

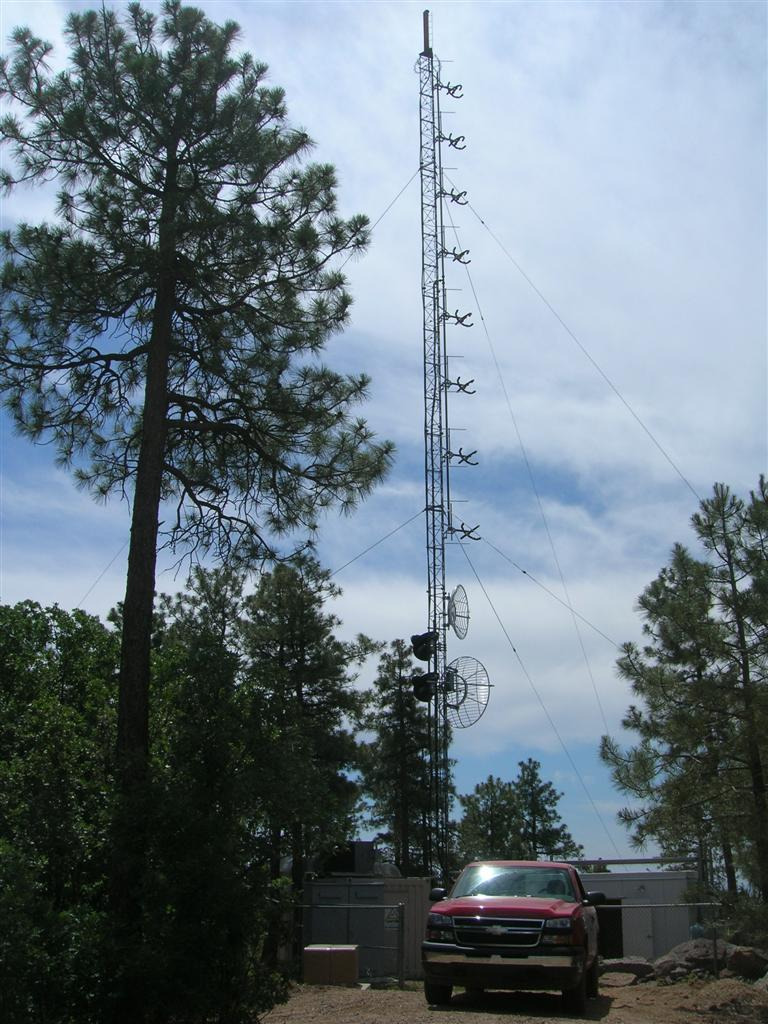
2008 Photo of Transmitter site 102.1FM
