= KWRQ =

- Clifton, Arizona; United States
- Broadcast area: Safford, Arizona
- Frequency: 102.3 MHz
- Branding: Sunny 102.3

Programming
- Format: Hot adult contemporary

Ownership
- Owner: Reed Richins; (Double-R-Communications LLC)
- Sister stations: KATO, KXKQ

History
- First air date: October 1, 1986
- Former call signs: KXJJ (1984–1985, CP); KJJJ (1985–1995)

Technical information
- Licensing authority: FCC
- Facility ID: 56341
- Class: C1
- ERP: 4,300 watts
- HAAT: 690 meters (2264 feet)
- Transmitter coordinates: 32°53′23″N 109°19′26″W

Links
- Public license information: Public file; LMS
- Website: gilavalleycentral.net

KWRQ (102.3 FM, "Sunny 102.3") is a radio station licensed to serve Clifton, Arizona, United States. The station is owned by Double-R-Communications LLC. It airs a Hot Adult Contemporary music format.

The station was assigned the KWRQ call letters by the Federal Communications Commission on November 1, 1995.
