= KTAN =

Radio station in Sierra Vista, Arizona

- Sierra Vista, Arizona; United States
- Broadcast area: Southwest Cochise County, Arizona
- Frequency: 1420 kHz
- Branding: Thunder 98.1

Programming
- Format: Classic rock
- Affiliations: Premiere Networks

Ownership
- Owner: Townsquare Media; (Townsquare License, LLC)
- Sister stations: KWCD, KZMK

History
- First air date: July 30, 1957
- Former call signs: KHFH (1957–1973); KTAN (1973–1996); KLTW (1996–1997)

Technical information
- Licensing authority: FCC
- Facility ID: 23446
- Class: B
- Power: 1,500 watts (day); 500 watts (night)
- Transmitter coordinates: 31°32′47″N 110°16′29″W
- Translator: 98.1 K251CQ (Sierra Vista)

Links
- Public license information: Public file; LMS
- Webcast: Listen live
- Website: thunder981.com

KTAN (1420 AM) is a commercial radio station licensed to Sierra Vista, Arizona, United States, and serves the Southwestern Cochise County area with a classic rock format. The station is owned by Townsquare Media and features programing from Premiere Networks. Programming is also heard on 50-watt FM translator K251CQ at 98.1 MHz.

== History ==
=== KHFH ===
This station signed on the air on July 30, 1957. It was a daytimer station, powered at 1,000 watts and required to go off the air at night. Its call sign was KHFH (Historic Fort Huachuca). KHFH was the first radio station in Sierra Vista and the third radio station in Cochise County. The first, KSUN in Bisbee (now defunct), went on the air in 1933, and the second, KAWT (later KDAP, now defunct) in Douglas, came to air in 1947. All three stations were owned by Carleton Morris and KHFH was the most powerful of the three.

The studio was located at the intersection of Carmichael Avenue and DePalma Street (now 700 Carmichael Ave.) and the transmitter was located in an undeveloped area in the southeast part of town, now 2300 Busby Drive. In 1958, the license holder requested permission from the FCC to operate at night for one night only in order to broadcast election result; the FCC denied the request. The station was finally granted nighttime operations on September 5, 1962, with a power of 500 watts using a directional pattern. At the same time that nighttime operations began, the studios were relocated to the transmitter site.

KHFH was the only radio station in a small town adjacent to military base Ft. Huachuca. For that reason, KHFH broadcast a variety of programming to suit everyone's preferences. The station aired a middle of the road (MOR) format in the morning, country music in the afternoon, Top 40 and rock music at night and even classical music on Sunday evenings. Due to a significant number of German speaking people in the area, the station also broadcast one hour a week of programming in German, both music and talk. Even the commercials were in the German language. In addition to the variety of musical formats, KHFH also broadcast the local high school football, basketball and baseball games, both home and away, along with local news several times a day. Huachuca Broadcasting Company became the licensee in 1966 in the wake of Carleton Morris's 1962 death.

=== KTAN ===
The call sign was changed to KTAN in September 1973 when a sister station was added, KTAN-FM 100.9 (now co-owned KZMK). The KTAN call sign had previously been used at 580 AM in Tucson between 1959 and 1967, so listeners in the Sierra Vista area were familiar with it. The FM station carried a Top 40 format while the AM station broadcast a middle of the road (MOR) music.

The country and classical formats were dropped, but the local news and local high school sports broadcasts remained. KTAN changed back to country music from 1979 to 1998, which continued under four different owners. From 1998 to 1999, it broadcast a Contemporary Christian music sound. In 1999, KTAN switched to a talk radio format, that became popular with AM stations in the 1990s. KTAN aired popular nationally syndicated conservative talk shows plus some local talk programs. Cherry Creek Radio acquired the station from Commonwealth Broadcasting in 2003. In July 2015, KTAN switched to classic country music. This was done because of declining advertising revenues for the talk format. Some local advertisers were becoming leery of having their business names associated with controversial topics and programs.

On June 6, 2019, KTAN flipped from classic country to classic rock, branded as "Thunder 98.1." Programming began to simulcast on FM translator K251CQ at 98.1 MHz.

Effective June 17, 2022, Cherry Creek Radio sold KTAN as part of a 42 station and 21 translator package to Townsquare Media for $18.75 million.
