= KTBA =

- Tuba City, Arizona; United States
- Frequency: 730 kHz

Programming
- Format: Native American religion

Ownership
- Owner: Across Nations
- Sister stations: KHAC, KWIM

History
- Call sign meaning: TuBA City

Technical information
- Licensing authority: FCC
- Facility ID: 71794
- Class: D
- Power: 1,000 watts (day); 16 watts (night)
- Transmitter coordinates: 36°07′54″N 111°15′1.5″W
- Translator: (95.3 MHz) K237GV (Tuba City)

Links
- Public license information: Public file; LMS
- Website: KTBA website

KTBA (AM) is a radio station licensed to serve Tuba City, Arizona, United States. The station is owned by Across Nations. It airs a Native American religious format.

When it first came on the air in 1981 KTBA was on 1050 kHz. It moved to 760 kHz in 2007, then to 730 kHz in 2026.

The station was assigned the KTBA call letters by the Federal Communications Commission.

== Translator ==
In addition to the main station, KTBA is relayed by an additional translator to widen its broadcast area.

Call sign	Frequency	City of license	FID	ERP (W)	Class	FCC info
W237GV	95.3 FM	Tuba City, Arizona	201311	250	D	LMS
