= KTHQ =

Radio station in Eagar, Arizona

- Eagar, Arizona; United States
- Broadcast area: Show Low, Arizona
- Frequency: 92.5 MHz
- Branding: Q Country 92.5

Programming
- Format: Country

Ownership
- Owner: William and Mary Ann Konopnicki; (WSK Family Credit Shelter Trust UTA)
- Sister stations: KJIK, KQAZ, KRVZ

History
- Former call signs: KVAO

Technical information
- Licensing authority: FCC
- Facility ID: 72730
- Class: C1
- ERP: 65,000 watts
- HAAT: 359.0 meters (1,177.8 ft)
- Transmitter coordinates: 34°15′06″N 109°35′06″W

Links
- Public license information: Public file; LMS
- Webcast: Listen Live
- Website: Official Website

KTHQ (92.5 FM "Q Country 92.5") is a radio station licensed to serve Eagar, Arizona, United States. The station is owned by William and Mary Ann Konopnicki through licensee WSK Family Credit Shelter Trust UTA. It airs a country music format.

The station was assigned the KTHQ call letters by the Federal Communications Commission on December 13, 1989.

== Translators ==
Call sign	Frequency	City of license	FID	ERP (W)	FCC info
K265DZ	(100.9 FM) FM	Indian Pine, Arizona	155998	250	LMS
