= KQAZ =

- Springerville, Arizona; United States
- Broadcast area: Show Low, Arizona
- Frequency: 101.7 MHz
- Branding: Majik 101.7

Programming
- Format: Adult contemporary
- Affiliations: Jones Radio

Ownership
- Owner: William and Mary Ann Konopnicki; (WSK Family Credit Shelter Trust UTA)
- Sister stations: KJIK, KRVZ, KTHQ

History
- First air date: July 15, 1984

Technical information
- Licensing authority: FCC
- Facility ID: 17391
- Class: C1
- ERP: 55,000 watts
- HAAT: 379 meters (1243 feet)
- Transmitter coordinates: 34°15′06″N 109°35′06″W

Links
- Public license information: Public file; LMS
- Website: majik101.com

KQAZ (101.7 FM, "Majik 101.7") is a radio station licensed to serve Springerville, Arizona, United States. The station is owned by William and Mary Ann Konopnicki through licensee WSK Family Credit Shelter Trust UTA. It airs an adult contemporary format.

The station was assigned the KQAZ call letters by the Federal Communications Commission on February 6, 1984.
