= KWSQ-LP =

Simulcast of KWSS-LP Scottsdale
- Mesa, Arizona; United States
- Frequency: 99.5 MHz

Programming
- Format: Indie music; community radio

Ownership
- Owner: Randi Scott and Danielle Cutler; (KWSF Radio)

History
- First air date: 2014
- Former call signs: KUKQ-LP (2014); KOWO-LP (2014–2015); KQCX-LP (2015–2016); KFXY-LP (2016–2022); KBYE-LP (2022); KWSF-LP (2022–2024)
- Former frequencies: 99.1 MHz (2015–2020)

Technical information
- Licensing authority: FCC
- Facility ID: 192016
- ERP: 2 watts
- HAAT: 260 meters (850 ft)
- Transmitter coordinates: 33°29′33″N 111°38′24″W

Links
- Public license information: LMS
- Website: kwss.org

KWSQ-LP (99.5 FM) is a low-power FM radio station in Mesa, Arizona. Broadcasting on 99.5 FM, KWSQ-LP is owned by KWSF Radio and simulcasts KWSS-LP 93.9 in Scottsdale.

The original construction permit specified operation on 106.7 MHz, but this was soon changed to 99.1 because of severe interference from KKMR on 106.5. The station signed on in early 2014 as KUKQ-LP with an alternative music format known as "KQ99.1". The KUKQ call sign was formerly used in the Valley at 1060 AM (now KDUS). After a stint as KOWO-LP "Wow 99.1" from 2014 to 2015, the station relaunched as KQCX-LP in September 2015, then flipped again to alternative rock as "FX 99.1" on January 1, 2016. The call sign was changed once more on January 22, 2016, to KFXY-LP.

As KFXY-LP, the station initially broadcast a classic country format with Americana and Roots programming known as Coyote Country 99.1. After some time off air, KFXY-LP came back on air in 2020 with a variety format with the name "Fuzzy 99.5". About a month after that, KFXY-LP re-branded as "99.5 The Ranch" and began playing a classic country format mixed with some classic rock and Texas country.

The station changed its call sign to KBYE-LP on June 28, 2022; the KFXY call sign was transferred to a new noncommercial FM construction permit owned by San Tan in Alma, Colorado. The low-power license had to be divested, as owners of a low-power FM station cannot own any other stations. Effective July 27, 2022, KBYE-LP was sold by original licensee San Tan Educational Media to KWSF Radio for $775.43, representing the value of the station's equipment. On August 5, 2022, the station's call sign was changed again, this time to KWSF-LP; it returned to service as a simulcast of KWSS-LP on September 1. The station changed its call sign once more on February 16, 2024, to KWSQ-LP.
