= KCYK =

Radio station in Yuma, Arizona, United States

- Yuma, Arizona; United States
- Broadcast area: Yuma, Arizona; San Luis Río Colorado, Sonora
- Frequency: 1400 kHz
- Branding: Outlaw Country 1400

Programming
- Language: English
- Format: Country
- Affiliations: Westwood One; AP Radio

Ownership
- Owner: Monstermedia, LLC
- Sister stations: KLJZ

History
- First air date: December 14, 1950
- Former call signs: KYMA (1950–1957); KVOY (1957–1984); KEZC (1984–1997); KJOK (1997–2009)

Technical information
- Licensing authority: FCC
- Facility ID: 39616
- Class: C
- Power: 1,000 watts day
- Transmitter coordinates: 32°39′6.2″N 114°39′3.8″W

Links
- Public license information: Public file; LMS
- Website: monstermediayuma.com

KCYK (1400 AM, "Outlaw Country 1400") is a radio station broadcasting a Country music format. Licensed to serve the community of Yuma, Arizona, United States and San Luis Río Colorado, Sonora, Mexico, the station is currently owned by MonsterMedia, LLC.

== Programming ==
KCYK's programming includes local news and weather with Jennifer Blackwell, classic country programming, and live games of the Arizona Diamondbacks. AP News coverage is provided at the top of each hour.

== History ==
On December 14, 1950, radio station KYMA began broadcasting at 1400 kHz with 250 watts of power as a Mutual/Don Lee network affiliate. It was later an NBC Radio affiliate for the Imperial Valley until the early 1970s. The station changed its call sign to KVOY in January 1957, then to KIVY in 1972, then to KEZC in May 1984, to KJOK in January 1997, and to KCYK in November 2009.

Current owner Keith Lewis acquired KEZC and KJOK (93.1 FM) in 1997. KJOK FM became KLJZ in 1997.

The KYMA call letters were revived in Yuma as a television station in 1987.
