= KXKQ =

- Safford, Arizona; United States
- Broadcast area: Safford, Arizona
- Frequency: 94.5 MHz
- Branding: Kat Kountry 94.5

Programming
- Format: Country

Ownership
- Owner: Reed Richins; (Double-R-Communications LLC)
- Sister stations: KATO, KWRQ

Technical information
- Licensing authority: FCC
- Facility ID: 40916
- Class: C2
- ERP: 1,700 watts
- HAAT: 671.0 meters (2,201.4 ft)
- Transmitter coordinates: 32°53′23″N 109°19′26″W

Links
- Public license information: Public file; LMS
- Website: https://gilavalleycentral.net

KXKQ (94.5 FM, "Kat Kountry 94") is a radio station licensed to serve Safford, Arizona, United States. The station is owned by Reed Richins, through licensee Double-R-Communications LLC. It airs a country music format. Home of "Reed in the Morning", hosted by Reed Richins. The top morning show in the Gila Valley for 25 years.

The station was assigned the KXKQ call letters by the Federal Communications Commission on March 13, 1979.

In 2000, KXKQ was named "Best Country Music Station" by the editors of the Phoenix New Times. In 2001, the same newspaper named KXKQ "Best Country Radio Station".
