= KWFH =

- Parker, Arizona; United States
- Broadcast area: Lake Havasu City, Arizona; Needles, California; Parker, Arizona
- Frequency: 90.3 MHz
- Branding: Alive FM

Programming
- Format: Christian contemporary music

Ownership
- Owner: Advance Ministries, Inc.

History
- First air date: |November 1984

Technical information
- Licensing authority: FCC
- Facility ID: 16762
- Class: C2
- ERP: 800 watts
- HAAT: 760 meters (2,490 ft)
- Transmitter coordinates: 34°33′05″N 114°11′40″W
- Translator: 99.3 K257DV (Twenty-Nine Palms)
- Repeater: KAIH

Links
- Public license information: Public file; LMS
- Website: alivefm.org

KWFH is a radio station licensed to Parker, Arizona, that broadcasts Christian Contemporary music on 90.3 MHz. The station serves the areas of Lake Havasu City, Arizona; Needles, California; and Parker, Arizona. KWFH is owned by Advance Ministries, Inc.
