= KFAS =

Radio station in Casa Grande, Arizona (1956–1997)

- Casa Grande, Arizona; United States
- Frequency: 1260 kHz

History
- First air date: December 6, 1956
- Last air date: At least November 1995 (license cancelled February 9, 1997)
- Former call signs: KPIN (1956–1989)
- Call sign meaning: Francis Albert Sinatra

Technical information
- Facility ID: 2752
- Power: 1,000 watts day; 93 watts night

KFAS was a radio station on 1260 kHz in Casa Grande, Arizona, United States, which operated from December 6, 1956, to at least November 1995. Its FCC license was canceled on February 9, 1997.

== History ==
KPIN (call letters standing for Pinal County) signed on December 6, 1956, as the first radio station in Casa Grande. It broadcast with 1,000 watts during the day on 1260 kHz and was owned by the ABC Service Company, named for its three proprietors: E. Glenn Abercrombie, Milton F. Brown, Jr., and N. L. Caperton. Within six months of signing on, ABC Service Company sold the station to John W. Parham and David A. Garee, who promptly exited the partnership. In 1966, Casa Grande Broadcasting bought the station; by the time of its sale to KPIN, Inc. at the end of 1970, it held an affiliation with the Mutual Broadcasting System. In 1973, an application was made by new owner Santa Cruz Valley Communication Systems for an FM partner on 105.5 MHz; Brett F. Eisele filed a mutually exclusive application and won the frequency, which signed on as KBFE in 1976.

In 1989, a consortium of owners including Frank Sinatra bought the station, continuing a revolving door of owners. The call sign was changed to KFAS, and it was paired with KFAS-FM (the former KBFE) at 105.5 MHz, giving it the FM counterpart it had not been able to obtain 15 years prior. The call sign was derived from Sinatra's initials. KFAS broadcast country music, while KFAS-FM held an adult contemporary format. By 1990, KFAS had flipped to Spanish to fill a void created when station KXMK changed formats to classical music in a simulcast with Phoenix-area station KONC. Ultimately, the two stations began simulcasting again. However, the combo soon became embroiled in a buyout, lawsuits, and in 1992, a suit filed by the Associated Press which sought $28,158 in unpaid wire service bills.

In 1995, KFAS's FM counterpart (by now known as KKER), which had upgraded its facilities in order to become a rimshot into Phoenix, was bought by McDaniel and Callaham and began broadcasting the K-LOVE network, changing its calls to KLVA and later being sold directly to the Educational Media Foundation. One last go was made of 1260 AM late in 1995, when it returned to the air after an absence of more than two years and bearing a country format. It also sought to use the KKER call sign that had been used by 105.5 FM. This final incarnation of the station was short-lived, disappearing quickly, and the license was canceled in February 1997 for failure to transmit in a 12-month period under Section 312(g) of the Communications Act.

In May 2010, 1260 AM returned to Pinal County when KBSZ relocated from Wickenburg to Apache Junction, moving from 1250 kHz.
