= KWCD =

Radio station in Bisbee, Arizona

- Bisbee, Arizona; United States
- Broadcast area: Sierra Vista, Arizona
- Frequency: 92.3 MHz
- Branding: KWCD Country 92.3 FM

Programming
- Format: Country music
- Affiliations: Compass Media Networks; Premiere Networks

Ownership
- Owner: Townsquare Media; (Townsquare License, LLC)
- Sister stations: KTAN, KZMK

History
- First air date: October 12, 1979
- Former call signs: KBAZ (1979–1980); KZMK (1980–1993)

Technical information
- Licensing authority: FCC
- Facility ID: 22972
- Class: A
- ERP: 90 watts
- HAAT: 649.0 meters (2,129.3 ft)
- Transmitter coordinates: 31°28′52″N 109°57′30″W

Links
- Public license information: Public file; LMS
- Webcast: Listen Live
- Website: kwcdcountry.com

KWCD (92.3 FM) is a radio station broadcasting a country music format. It is licensed to Bisbee, Arizona, United States. This station serves southern Cochise County, Arizona and a small piece of northern Sonora, Mexico. The station is currently owned by Townsquare Media.

== History ==
This station went on the air using the call sign KBAZ (meaning: Bisbee AriZona) on October 12, 1979. This station was the second FM radio station in southern Cochise County. In 1982, under new ownership, this station rebranded itself, changed its call sign to KZMK (meaning: cosmic) and was called "The Starship". For several months prior to the change, billboards appeared around Cochise County featuring a flying saucer with the words "the starship is coming", leaving people to wonder what they meant. Just prior to the change, the call sign and the frequency were added to the billboards as well as the wording was changed to "the starship is here".

KZMK entered into direct competition with KTAZ-FM, which was at the time the number 1 rock and roll station in the area. KZMK was broadcasting with considerably less power than its rival KTAZ, (55 watts vs. 3,000 watts) and was called by broadcasters "the 50 watt blowtorch", however KZMK's signal covers a greater area, to include all of the populated areas in southern Cochise County as well as parts of northern Cochise County and parts of northern Sonora, Mexico because its transmitter is located on a mountain peak, at an approximate elevation of 7,000 feet above sea level. Ironically both stations are now owned by the same company

On September 1, 1993, the station changed its call sign to the current KWCD, and changed its format to Country Western. The call sign KZMK was assumed by its old rival KTAZ-FM. The station's power was later increased to 90 watts.

== History of ownership ==
1979–1982 Wrye and Associates

1982–1996 Copper Valley Broadcasting

1996–2000 DB Broadcasting

2000–2003 Commonwealth Broadcasting

2003–2022 Cherry Creek Media

2022–present Townsquare Media
