= KNAU =

Public radio station at Northern Arizona University in Flagstaff, Arizona

- Flagstaff, Arizona; United States
- Frequency: 88.7 MHz (HD Radio)
- Branding: KNAU, Arizona Public Radio

Programming
- Format: News/talk and information; classical music
- Affiliations: NPR, American Public Media, Public Radio International

Ownership
- Owner: Northern Arizona University
- Sister stations: KPUB

History
- First air date: December 16, 1970 (as KAXR at 88.5)
- Former call signs: KAXR (1970–1980)
- Former frequencies: 88.5 MHz (1970–1983)
- Call sign meaning: "Northern Arizona University"

Technical information
- Licensing authority: FCC
- Facility ID: 49490
- Class: C
- ERP: 100,000 watts
- HAAT: 445 meters (1,460 ft)
- Transmitter coordinates: 34°58′7″N 111°30′24″W
- Translator: see below
- Repeater: 90.7 KNAA (Show Low)

Links
- Public license information: Public file; LMS
- Webcast: Listen Live
- Website: www.knau.org

KNAU (88.7 FM) is a radio station broadcasting a classical music and news/talk and information format. Licensed to Flagstaff, Arizona, United States, KNAU and its sister stations serve Northern Arizona. The station is currently owned by Northern Arizona University (NAU) and features programming from National Public Radio, Public Radio International, and American Public Media, among other content providers. NAU also owns KPUB (91.7 FM), a station devoted to talk programming, and student-run low-power station KLJX-LP (107.1 FM). KNAU's programming is heard on KNAA (90.7 FM) in Show Low and on five translators in northern Arizona, as well as online.

Broadcasting activity at NAU began in 1962 as a 10-watt AM station, run by students, with student-built transmitter and antenna atop Sechrist Hall. The format was Top 40, playing popular music of the day. It was switched to a carrier current service in 1968, making it available only in campus buildings rather than over the air. The FM station was approved in 1968 and began broadcasting in December 1970 as KAXR. It was a 10-watt station that aired some arts programming as well as student DJ-selected music. In the early 1980s, the station transformed from a local outlet into a regional public radio station, which included a frequency change and power increase to 100,000 watts in 1983, expanded facilities and staff, affiliation with NPR, and the construction of new transmitters.

== History ==
=== Foundation ===
NAU's broadcasting legacy began with station KASC, built in 1962 at what was then Arizona State College at Flagstaff. Soon after the Arizona Board of Regents gave approval to raise the school to university status as Northern Arizona University effective May 1, 1966, KASC began considering changing its call letters to KNAU in late 1964. The change did not take place until 1967, a year in which the student station was pranked by someone claiming to be an administrator dismissing campus early for Christmas due to a particularly bad snowstorm; half of the students left campus before the situation was rectified.

As early as 1966, the idea of an FM station that might provide wider service to the city of Flagstaff outside of campus was considered. On June 19, 1968, NAU filed with the Federal Communications Commission (FCC) to build a new 10-watt station at 88.5 MHz in Flagstaff. Approval was granted on September 11 of that year, but the station did not begin regular programming until December 16, 1970.

KAXR ("K-Axer", referring to the university's Lumberjacks mascot) was the second FM station in Flagstaff and had a fine arts and classical music orientation, though it also played rock music. It complemented carrier current KNAU, which remained in service as a student station. The transmitter was donated by Phoenix College, whose KFCA had already upgraded to higher power. NAU had also been donated equipment to possibly operate an AM station at 1230 kHz, which was being vacated by KEOS in its move to 690 kHz; however, an FCC freeze on new AM station applications forestalled any use of the frequency.

=== Going regional ===
The small FM station began its effort to transform into a regional outlet at the end of the 1970s. In 1979, it filed to increase power to 100,000 watts to comply with FCC rules restricting 10-watt Class D stations like KAXR; the Board of Regents included funds in its 1980–81 budget to carry out the upgrade. The university had opted to go all the way because it said such a major upgrade could attract grant support.

On August 18, 1980, KAXR became KNAU, a set of call letters that previously belonged to the scrapped freighter Kenneth McKay; the designation had been denied originally to the station because of its use by the ship. The first full-time station manager was also hired as part of the move away from a small student station to a regional NPR station, which would fill one of the public network's coverage gaps. Even though some grant money had already been allocated, budget cuts at NAU almost ended the project before it began and threatened the station's future. However, station officials were able to allay the university's concerns by using university personnel for construction and cutting the budget for studio equipment, and in May 1982, the project got the green light, only to be held up again when an architect's bid for new studios came in much higher than budgeted.

In March 1983, after NAU's College of Creative Arts reorganized some offices and relocated speech pathology to another building, space in the Creative Arts Building was identified to house KNAU studios, and the project was approved for good. A transmitter was built on Mormon Mountain, while a satellite uplink was added for the reception of public radio programming. On November 28, 1983, KNAU switched from 10 watts at 88.5 MHz to 100,000 watts at 88.7 MHz. In its metamorphosis, KNAU not only had expanded its coverage area, but it had also hired its first news director, expanded its record library from 300 to 1,500 classical selections, and added more full-time staff. Full public radio status from the Corporation for Public Broadcasting allowed the station to begin airing NPR and American Public Radio programs in 1984. It marked a return to NPR for KNAU, which as KAXR had been briefly aligned with the network in 1974.

The first two translators were approved in 1985, one on Mount Francis to serve Prescott and one on Mount Elden to serve areas of Flagstaff that experience heavy multipath distortion with signals transmitted from Mormon Mountain. The next year, KNAU was approved to expand its service north and west to Page and Kingman. Also in 1986, KNAU was first to report the crash of an airplane and a helicopter over the Grand Canyon, earning it a Governors' Award from the Associated Press.

=== Growth to two services ===
In 1995, KNAU replaced the 90.7 transmitter on Mount Elden with a new 500-watt full-service station, KNAQ. This station became a separate program service, talk-oriented KPUB, in 2001; the switch was in response to KJZZ in Phoenix losing its Flagstaff translator the year prior, taking with it many longform talk programs that KNAU did not carry. The station moved to new studios on NAU's South Campus in 1998, leaving the Creative Arts Building behind after starting there in 1970.

KNAU was honored with three national Edward R. Murrow Awards for small-market radio stations in 2014.

== Funding ==
In fiscal year 2021, KNAU had total revenue of $3.14 million, of which $477,000 came from the Corporation for Public Broadcasting. NAU provided $376,000 in appropriations. Memberships made up nearly $566,000, and the station had 4,238 members.

== Programming ==
KNAU broadcasts classical music from the Classical 24 service and key public radio news programs, including Morning Edition, All Things Considered, Marketplace, and Fresh Air. KNAU has more talk programs on the weekend, which are simulcast with KPUB.

== Transmitters and translators ==
Since the activation of its two translators in 1985, KNAU has steadily increased its regional coverage footprint through the construction of translators and high-power stations, as well as content partnerships, including in northern Arizona's Native American communities. In 2002, KNAU assisted in the launch of KUYI on the Hopi reservation by providing access to NPR programming as well as its own local and regional news; this was the second station it had provided NPR programming to, after KGHR in Tuba City. At one time in the mid-2000s, KNAU supported KAWC-FM in Yuma, with KNAU's network operations manager serving as the general manager of KAWC-FM.

In 2008, Cellular One of Show Low donated $67,000 to support a satellite interconnection system to improve the signal delivery from Flagstaff, which had been intermittent.

Broadcast translators for KNAU
| Call sign | Frequency | City of license | FID | ERP (W) | Class | FCC info |
|---|---|---|---|---|---|---|
| K207DX | 89.3 FM | Kingman, Arizona | 3379 | 90 | D | LMS |
| K228EA | 93.5 FM | Payson, Arizona | 138788 | 10 | D | LMS |
| K273AN | 102.5 FM | Cottonwood, Arizona | 138603 | 10 | D | LMS |
| K287AI | 105.3 FM | Vernon, Arizona | 155929 | 10 | D | LMS |
| K291AL | 106.1 FM | Prescott, Arizona | 138786 | 10 | D | LMS |
