= KWIM =

- Window Rock, Arizona; United States
- Frequency: 104.9 MHz

Programming
- Format: Native American religion

Ownership
- Owner: Across Nations
- Sister stations: KHAC, KTBA

History
- Former call signs: KHAC-FM (1992–1994)

Technical information
- Licensing authority: FCC
- Facility ID: 71795
- Class: C2
- ERP: 30,000 watts
- HAAT: 91.0 meters (298.6 ft)
- Transmitter coordinates: 35°39′19″N 109°1′59″W

Links
- Public license information: Public file; LMS
- Website: KWIM website

KWIM (104.9 FM) is a radio station broadcasting a Native American religious format. It is licensed to Window Rock, Arizona, United States. The station is currently owned by Across Nations.
