= KZMK =

Radio station in Sierra Vista, Arizona

- Sierra Vista, Arizona; United States
- Broadcast area: Southwest Cochise County Arizona
- Frequency: 100.9 MHz
- Branding: K101

Programming
- Format: Top 40 (CHR)
- Affiliations: Compass Media Networks; Premiere Networks

Ownership
- Owner: Townsquare Media; (Townsquare License, LLC)
- Sister stations: KTAN, KWCD

History
- First air date: September 9, 1973
- Former call signs: KSVA (never used on air); KTAN-FM (1973–1977); KTAZ (1977–1989); KFFN (1989–1993)

Technical information
- Licensing authority: FCC
- Facility ID: 23445
- Class: A
- ERP: 3,000 watts
- HAAT: −14.0 meters (−45.9 ft)
- Transmitter coordinates: 31°32′47.00″N 110°16′29.00″W

Links
- Public license information: Public file; LMS
- Webcast: Listen Live
- Website: allhitskzmk.com

KZMK (100.9 FM) is a radio station broadcasting a contemporary hit radio format. Licensed to Sierra Vista, Arizona, United States, it serves southwestern Cochise County, Arizona. The station is currently owned by Townsquare Media, through licensee Townsquare License, LLC.

== History ==
This station first went on the air on September 9, 1973 using the call sign KTAN-FM, and it broadcast a top 40 rock and roll format. It was the sister station of KTAN AM and the first FM station in southern Cochise County. KTAN-AM-FM was owned by Ken Ferguson (Huachuca Broadcasting). Ken Ferguson died in a plane crash in 1977 and the station was sold, changing its call sign to KTAZ-FM to coincide with its use of Z-Rock as its music service. In 1989, under GCS Broadcasting, the call sign was changed to KFFN. The current call sign of KZMK were adopted in 1993 after the owners purchased a rival FM station that was using the call letters KZMK. That station is now KWCD.

KZMK was sold to DB Broadcasting in 1995, Commonwealth Broadcasting in 2000, and Cherry Creek Media in 2003.

Effective June 17, 2022, Cherry Creek Radio sold KZMK as part of a 42 station/21 translator package to Townsquare Media for $18.75 million.
