= KYCA =

- Prescott, Arizona; United States
- Frequency: 1490 kHz
- Branding: KYCA News Talk Radio

Programming
- Format: Talk radio
- Affiliations: CBS News Radio; Compass Media Networks; Premiere Networks; Townhall News; Westwood One

Ownership
- Owner: Jason Zinzilieta and Janice Derks; (Prescott Broadcasting, LLC)
- Sister stations: KAHM

History
- First air date: October 1, 1940
- Former frequencies: 1500 kHz (1940–1941)
- Call sign meaning: Yavapai County, Arizona

Technical information
- Licensing authority: FCC
- Facility ID: 61433
- Class: C
- Power: 1,000 watts (unlimited)
- Transmitter coordinates: 34°33′03″N 112°27′45″W
- Translator: 103.5 K278CN (Prescott)

Links
- Public license information: Public file; LMS
- Webcast: Listen live
- Website: www.kyca.info

KYCA (1490 AM, "The News 1490") is a commercial radio station licensed to Prescott, Arizona, United States. Owned by Jason Zinzilieta and Janice Derks, via Prescott Broadcasting, LLC., it features a talk radio format. Studios are located on Commercial Way in Prescott.

KYCA is also heard on FM translator K278CN at 103.5 MHz.

== History ==
On October 1, 1940, the station signed on the air. KYCA has been serving Prescott, providing news and other programming to the rapidly growing area. An early slogan of KYCA was, "At 1490 since 1940". The station was originally part of the Arizona Radio Network and was owned by KTAR radio in Phoenix beginning in 1944.

The station was acquired by the Silverstein family in 1970. It was sold in 2017, after the death of Lou Silverstein, to Phoenix Radio Broadcasting.

KYCA became a network affiliate of the Fox News Radio Network and Westwood One, also carrying local news, sports, and other information. The station first began its transition to full-time news-talk radio with the premiere of The Rush Limbaugh Show in 1988 and The Dr. Dean Edell Show a few years later. The station has carried syndicated programs from Limbaugh, Laura Ingraham, Michael Savage, and Lars Larson.

KYCA has an FM translator at 103.5 MHz, which formerly broadcast on 97.1 MHz in Winslow.

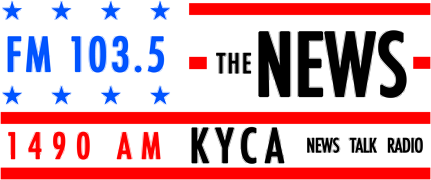
Previous logo

Effective January 12, 2018, Southwest Broadcasting sold KYCA (as well as translator K278CN and sister station 102.1 KAHM and its translator K269EE) to Phoenix Radio Broadcasting, a holding company for the Cesar Chavez Foundation's Farmworker Educational Radio Network.

Effective May 19, 2021, Phoenix Radio Broadcasting sold KYCA and translator K278CN to Jason Zinzilieta and Janice Derks' Prescott Broadcasting, LLC for $1.03 million.
