= KLJZ =

Radio station in Yuma, Arizona, United States

Coordinates: 32.652°N 114.652°W

- Yuma, Arizona; United States
- Broadcast area: Yuma, Arizona
- Frequency: 93.1 MHz
- Branding: Z93

Programming
- Format: Hot adult contemporary
- Affiliations: Westwood One

Ownership
- Owner: Monstermedia
- Sister stations: KCYK

History
- First air date: 1972 (as KVOY-FM)
- Former call signs: KVOY-FM (1972–1973); KJOK (1973–1997)

Technical information
- Licensing authority: FCC
- Facility ID: 39617
- Class: C1
- ERP: 100,000 watts
- HAAT: 25 meters (82 ft)

Links
- Public license information: Public file; LMS
- Website: www.monstermediayuma.com

KLJZ (93.1 FM, "Z93") is a commercial radio station in Yuma, Arizona, serving Yuma, Arizona. KLJZ airs a hot adult contemporary format.

== History ==
KVOY-FM was licensed in 1972 as a sister station of KVOY (1400 AM), changing its calls to KJOK the next year. Current owner Keith Lewis acquired KJOK and KEZC (the former KVOY AM) in 1997. KJOK became KLJZ in 1997.
