= KSWG =

Radio station in Wickenburg, Arizona

Coordinates: 33.926°N 112.795°W

- Wickenburg, Arizona; United States
- Broadcast area: Northwest Phoenix metropolitan area
- Frequency: 96.3 MHz
- Branding: Real Country 96.3

Programming
- Format: Classic country

Ownership
- Owner: Barna Broadcasting LLC

History
- First air date: September 1992
- Former call signs: KFMA (1992–1993); KMEO (1993–1995); KBSZ (1995–1996)

Technical information
- Licensing authority: FCC
- Facility ID: 11216
- Class: C3
- ERP: 6,400 watts
- HAAT: 197 meters (646 ft)

Links
- Public license information: Public file; LMS
- Webcast: Listen live
- Website: www.963realcountry.com

KSWG (96.3 MHz) is a commercial FM radio station licensed to Wickenburg, Arizona. It is owned by Barna Broadcasting Company and airs a classic country radio format, using the moniker "Real Country 96.3". The station is considered a rimshot broadcaster because its transmitter is more than 50 miles (80 km) from downtown Phoenix, Arizona. KSWG's signal is primarily heard in northwest suburbs of the Phoenix market.

The studios and offices are on West Wickenburg Way in Wickenburg. The transmitter is off South Vulture Mine Road, also in Wickenburg.

== History ==
=== KFMA, KMEO and KBSZ ===
Today's KSWG began life in September 1992 on 93.7 MHz as modern rock station KFMA. The station was owned by Harold Shumway alongside KTIM (1250 AM), and as KFMA, it was run by former KUPD/KUKQ general manager Lloyd Melton. However, when KEDJ-FM was born months later, it pushed KFMA, with its partial-market signal, out of the format. Early in 1993 KFMA became KMEO, an easy listening music station using call letters made famous in Phoenix by KMEO-AM-FM; Melton sued Shumway in Maricopa County Superior Court.

On March 24, 1995, KMEO flipped to new age music as KBSZ "The Breeze". Geoff Stirling, a new age enthusiast and Canadian-American media mogul, had an unspecified stake in the station. KBSZ also made moves to increase its coverage; it picked up use of a translator from KEDJ at 96.3 MHz, improving its signal in metro Phoenix. It also moved its main signal to 94.1 with increased power in March 1996; the KBSZ call letters also turned up on the AM station on March 1, 1996. However, low audience turnout for the last concert the station sponsored and low ad sales prompted Circle S to move in a new direction.

=== KSWG ===
In July 1996, KBSZ-FM became KSWG "94 Country" with a classic country format. It was one of two new country stations in the Phoenix market that month, alongside KXLL/KBUQ "Young Buck Country".

In 2006, KSWG relocated from 94.1 to 96.3. The station was sold to Barna Broadcasting in 2012.

In 2017, an interference dispute lodged by KSWG against KXEG translator K241CS (96.1 FM) prompted a counter-filing alleging that the facility on which KSWG was operating was not the one it was licensed for; it was directional toward Phoenix, and the tower was 57 feet (17 m) higher than authorized.
