= KAIZ (FM) =

Christian radio station in Arizona, United States

- Avondale, Arizona; United States
- Broadcast area: Phoenix metropolitan area
- Frequency: 105.5 MHz (HD Radio)
- Branding: Air1

Programming
- Format: Christian worship music
- Network: Air1

Ownership
- Owner: Educational Media Foundation

History
- First air date: August 26, 1976
- Former call signs: KBFE (1976–1979); KSAA (1979–1983); KBBT (1983–1989); KFAS-FM (1989–1992); KKER (1992–1995); KLVA (1995–2018)
- Call sign meaning: Air1 Arizona

Technical information
- Licensing authority: FCC
- Facility ID: 2749
- Class: C2
- ERP: 800 watts
- HAAT: 941 meters (3,087 ft)
- Transmitter coordinates: 33°16′24″N 112°16′48″W
- Translator: 90.7 K214DN (Cave Creek)

Links
- Public license information: Public file; LMS
- Webcast: Listen live
- Website: www.air1.com

KAIZ is a Christian radio station licensed to Avondale, Arizona, broadcasting on 105.5 FM. The station provides the Air1 network to the Phoenix metropolitan area and is owned by the Educational Media Foundation.

== History ==
KBFE came to air August 26, 1976. Owned by the Eisele Broadcasting Corporation and named for Brett F. Eisele, KBFE broadcast from Casa Grande and held that callsign for just three years before being sold to Grande Communications Corporation, which renamed the station Casa FM 105 with the callsign KSAA. KSAA broadcast a Top 40 format from studios in a reconverted house. In 1983, KSAA became KBBT with a country music format after it was sold at a loss by Grande. In 1989, KBBT was sold by Video Communication and Radio to Casa Grande Broadcasters and changed its format to adult contemporary with a new callsign, KFAS-FM. It also began simulcasting with KPIN AM 1260 (now defunct), which changed its calls to KFAS but by 1990 returned to a country format. The new callsign came from one of the station's part-owners, Frank Sinatra (Francis Albert Sinatra). Casa Grande Broadcasters racked up indebtedness, and the partnership sold the station in 1992 to Robert Finkelstein's Arizona Radio Players in a buyout of the other partners in the company. Finkelstein paid $10,000 in cash and assumed $240,000 of bank indebtedness to acquire KFAS-FM. Arizona Radio Players applied to move the transmitter toward Maricopa and increase power to 50,000 watts, enabling the station to enter into the Phoenix market. From 1992 to 1995, the station used the KKER callsign.

In 1995, a receiver was appointed for Arizona Radio Players, selling the stations to McDaniel and Callaham. The Educational Media Foundation (EMF) began operating the station noncommercially, with new calls KLVA and the K-Love network. After one last attempt at local radio, 1260 AM disappeared, leaving Casa Grande without a local radio station. Two years later, EMF bought KLVA outright. For a brief time in the mid-1990s, KLVA operated a booster on South Mountain as part of its strategy to reach metropolitan Phoenix. An attempted 1997 sale to Big City Radio Phoenix, which would have seen KLVA return to commercial operation, fell through when that company declared bankruptcy and sold its stations.

In January 2017, EMF filed with the FCC to relocate KLVA to a transmitter in the Estrella Mountains and change its community of license to Avondale, Arizona; the proposed mountaintop site is higher, requiring the proposed new KLVA to broadcast with just 800 watts. The move was completed in November 2018, moving the KLVA call letters and K-Love format to 89.9 FM in Superior and Air1 to 105.5, which now covers most of the Phoenix area.
