= KAFF (AM) =

- Flagstaff, Arizona; United States
- Frequency: 930 kHz
- Branding: The Legend 93.5 & AM 930

Programming
- Format: Classic country
- Affiliations: ABC News Radio

Ownership
- Owner: Roger and Nancy Anderson; (Flagstaff Radio, Inc.)
- Sister stations: KAFF-FM, KFSZ, KMGN, KNOT, KTMG

History
- First air date: October 1962
- Former call signs: KFGT (1962–1963); KAFF (1963–1982); KFLG (1982–1986)
- Call sign meaning: Sounds like "Calf" (refers to Country music format)

Technical information
- Licensing authority: FCC
- Facility ID: 25694
- Class: D
- Power: 5,000 watts (day); 31 watts (night)
- Transmitter coordinates: 35°11′26″N 111°40′37″W
- Translator: 93.5 K228XO (Flagstaff)

Links
- Public license information: Public file; LMS
- Webcast: Listen live
- Website: thelegendaz.com

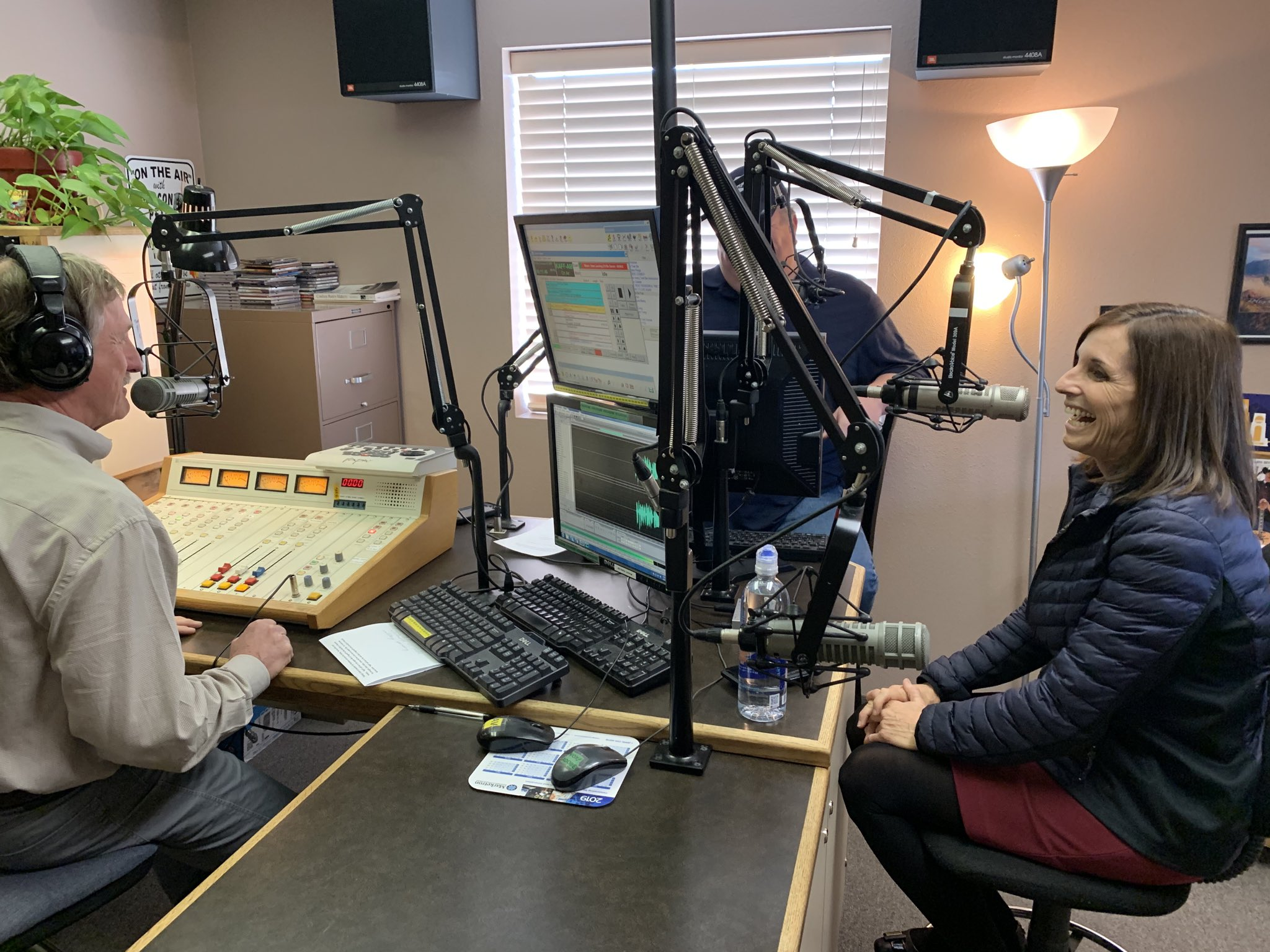
Martha McSally live on air in 2020 on KAFF.

KAFF (930 AM) is a commercial radio station licensed to Flagstaff, Arizona, United States. Owned by Roger and Nancy Anderson, through licensee Flagstaff Radio, Inc., it airs a classic country format, with studios on West Route 66 in Flagstaff. KAFF programming is also heard over low-power FM translator K228XO at 93.5 FM. The station is branded as "The Legend 93.5 & AM 930."

== History ==
The station signed on the air in October 1962 as KFGT. It was an automated station owned by Gene Philippi. Not long after signing on, the station went silent and was sold. The new owner was Guy Christian, who changed the call sign to KAFF and put the station back on air that fall.

Previous logo

An FM sister station, 92.9 KFLG, signed on in 1968. It originally played adult contemporary music during the day, country music at night and classical music for a few hours on Sunday. The two stations swapped call letters on March 1, 1982, with the FM station becoming KAFF and the AM station becoming KFLG. On December 16, 1986, KFLG changed its call sign back to KAFF. KAFF 930 began airing classic country music, while KAFF-FM 92.9 concentrates on current and recent country hits.

On August 1, 2024, KAFF changed their format from classic country to news/talk, branded as "KAFF News Radio".

On March 29, 2026, KAFF flipped back to classic country, branded as "The Legend 93.5 & AM 930".

== Programming ==
Jeff Kennedy hosts the station's local morning show; the rest of the weekday schedule is nationally syndicated conservative talk shows. The station also carries Fox Sports Radio on weekday evenings and weekends, and Northern Arizona University play-by-play sports.

== Translators ==
KAFF rebroadcasts on the following translator:

Broadcast translator for KAFF
Call sign	Frequency	City of license	FID	ERP (W)	Class	FCC info
K228XO	93.5 FM	Flagstaff, Arizona	30598	10	D	LMS
