= KSGC (Arizona) =

- Tusayan, Arizona; United States
- Frequency: 92.1 MHz
- Branding: Todays Best Hits

Programming
- Format: Defunct (was Hot Adult Contemporary)
- Affiliations: ABC Radio

Ownership
- Owner: Tusayan Broadcasting Company, Inc.

History
- Former call signs: KRBZ (1984–1991)

Technical information
- Licensing authority: FCC
- Facility ID: 68417
- Class: A
- ERP: 4,100 watts
- HAAT: 102.0 meters
- Transmitter coordinates: 35°58′14″N 112°7′53″W

Links
- Public license information: Public file; LMS

KSGC (92.1 FM) was a radio station broadcasting a Hot Adult Contemporary format. It is licensed to Tusayan, Arizona, United States. The station was owned by Tusayan Broadcasting Company, Inc. and featured programming from ABC Radio.

== History ==
The station went on the air as KRBZ in November 1984. In June 1991 the station changed its call sign to the current KSGC. The station went dark in April 2009 after the loss of its broadcast tower. Call letters KSGC now refer to a station in Garden City, Kansas.
