= KRCY-FM =

Radio station in Lake Havasu City, Arizona

- Lake Havasu City, Arizona; United States
- Broadcast area: Lake Havasu City, Arizona
- Frequency: 96.7 MHz
- Branding: Krazy FM

Programming
- Format: Classic hits
- Affiliations: Classic Hits (Westwood One)

Ownership
- Owner: Murphy Broadcasting; (Rick L. Murphy)
- Sister stations: KADD, KFTT, KRRK, KZUL-FM

History
- First air date: 1999 (as KBBC-FM)
- Former call signs: KANG (1998–1999); KBBC-FM (1999–2003)

Technical information
- Licensing authority: FCC
- Facility ID: 77754
- Class: C3
- ERP: 260 watts
- HAAT: 825 meters (2,707 ft)
- Transmitter coordinates: 34°33′6″N 114°11′37″W
- Translators: 96.3 K242AR (Lake Havasu City); 102.7 K274DH (Lake Havasu City); 103.9 K280EH (Kingman); 105.9 K290CG (Lake Havasu City)

Links
- Public license information: Public file; LMS
- Website: KRCY Krazy FM Online

KRCY-FM (96.7 FM, "Krazy FM") is a radio station broadcasting a classic hits format. Licensed to Lake Havasu City, Arizona, United States, the station serves the Laughlin, Nevada, area. The station is currently owned by Murphy Broadcasting and licensed to Rick L. Murphy. Much of the playlist is derived from Westwood One's "Classic Hits" satellite feed.

== History ==
The station was assigned the call letters KANG on 1998-07-17. On 1999-01-15, the station changed its call sign to KBBC-FM, and on 2003-01-30 to the current KRCY-FM.

== Translators ==
Broadcast translators for KRCY-FM
Call sign	Frequency	City of license	FID	ERP (W)	Class	FCC info
K242AR	96.3 FM	Lake Havasu City, Arizona	38307	10	D	LMS
K274DH	102.7 FM	Lake Havasu City, Arizona	30450	250	D	LMS
K280EH	103.9 FM	Kingman, Arizona	30448	10	D	LMS
K290CG	105.9 FM	Lake Havasu City, Arizona	156808	250	D	LMS
