= Riviera, Arizona =

Community in Mohave County, Arizona, US

Riviera
- Neighborhood
- Interactive map of Riviera
- Coordinates: 35°06′03″N 114°37′17″W
- Country: United States
- State: Arizona
- County: Mohave
- City: Bullhead City
- GNIS feature ID: 25309

Riviera is a community and neighborhood within the city limits of Bullhead City, Arizona, in Mohave County, Arizona, United States.

== History ==
Riviera was one of the three founding communities of the City of Bullhead City in 1984, along with the original Bullhead City and Holiday Shores. At the time of the incorporation of Bullhead City in 1984, the population of Riviera was estimated at 3,000 – larger than the community of Bullhead City itself, the population of which was estimated at only 1,000. Prior to incorporation, Bullhead City and Riviera were a part of the Bullhead City-Riviera CDP.

== Geography ==
Riviera is centered on a peninsula formed by a big bend of the Colorado River directly across the river from Nevada's Big Bend of the Colorado State Recreation Area.

== Parks ==
Rotary Park is located at the south end of the community.

== External references ==
- http://arizona.hometownlocator.com/az/mohave/riviera.cfm
