= KAFF-FM =

Coordinates: 34°58′07″N 111°30′24″W

- Flagstaff, Arizona; United States
- Broadcast area: Flagstaff-Prescott, Arizona
- Frequency: 92.9 (MHz)
- Branding: 92.9 KAFF Country

Programming
- Format: Country

Ownership
- Owner: Roger and Nancy Anderson; (Flagstaff Radio, Inc.)
- Sister stations: KAFF, KFSZ, KMGN, KNOT, KTMG

History
- First air date: 1968

Technical information
- Licensing authority: FCC
- Facility ID: 25693
- Class: C
- ERP: 98,000 watts
- HAAT: 461 meters
- Translator: 103.3 K277AR (Cottonwood)

Links
- Public license information: Public file; LMS
- Webcast: Listen Live
- Website: kaff.com

KAFF-FM is a commercial country music radio station in Flagstaff, Arizona, broadcasting to the Flagstaff-Prescott, Arizona, area on 92.9 FM.

== Translators ==
Broadcast translator for KAFF-FM
Call sign	Frequency	City of license	FID	ERP (W)	Class	FCC info
K277AR	103.3 FM	Cottonwood, Arizona	138607	10	D	LMS
