= San Lucy Village, Arizona =

San Lucy Village, Arizona Si:l Mek
- Populated place
- Location within the state of Arizona San Lucy Village (the United States)
- Coordinates: 32°57′50″N 112°43′05″W
- Country: United States
- State: Arizona
- County: Maricopa
- Tribe: Tohono O'odham Nation
- Elevation: 702 ft (214 m)
- Time zone: UTC-7 (Mountain (MST))
  - Summer (DST): UTC-7 (MST)
- Area code: 623
- FIPS code: 04-63330
- GNIS feature ID: 10841

San Lucy Village (O'odham: Si:l Mek) is a populated place situated in Maricopa County, Arizona, United States. It has an estimated elevation of 702 feet (214 m) above sea level. It is located one mile north of Gila Bend and has approximately 300 residents, almost all Tohono O'odham. San Lucy Village was previously located elsewhere but was moved due to the construction of the Painted Rock Dam.
