= KRRK =

- Desert Hills, Arizona; United States
- Broadcast area: Lake Havasu City, Arizona
- Frequency: 100.7 MHz
- Branding: K-Rock

Programming
- Format: Classic rock
- Affiliations: Westwood One; Floydian Slip

Ownership
- Owner: Murphy Broadcasting; (Smoke and Mirrors, LLC)
- Sister stations: KRCY, KZUL-FM, KMUR-FM

History
- First air date: 1974 (as KRFM at 101.1)
- Former call signs: KRFM (1974–1982); KBBC (1982–1997); KBBC-FM (10/1997–11/1997)
- Former frequencies: 101.1 MHz (1974–2011)
- Call sign meaning: K-RocK

Technical information
- Licensing authority: FCC
- Facility ID: 38314
- Class: C3
- ERP: 275 watts
- HAAT: 822 meters (2,697 ft)
- Transmitter coordinates: 34°33′6″N 114°11′37″W
- Translators: 96.3 K242AQ (Kingman); 98.3 K252FF (Lake Havasu City) (100.7 K264AB) Kingman ({{{3}}}); 107.5 K298BS (Lake Havasu City)

Links
- Public license information: Public file; LMS

KRRK (100.7 FM, "The Classic Rock Station") is a radio station broadcasting a classic rock music format. Licensed to Lake Havasu City, Arizona, United States, it serves the Mohave County, Arizona, area. The station is currently owned by Murphy Broadcasting, licensed to Smoke and Mirrors LLC, and features programming from Westwood One.

== History ==
On June 15, 2011, KRRK moved from 101.1 FM to 100.7 FM.

== Translators ==
Broadcast translators for KRRK
Call sign	Frequency	City of license	FID	ERP (W)	Class	FCC info
K242AQ	96.3 FM	Kingman, Arizona	30449	38	D	LMS
K252FF	98.3 FM	Lake Havasu City, Arizona	156326	50	D	LMS
K264AB	100.7 FM	Kingman, Arizona	9035	10	D	LMS
K298BS	107.5 FM	Lake Havasu City, Arizona	157424	50	D	LMS
