= KBOD =

Radio station in Gainesville, Missouri

- Gainesville, Missouri; United States
- Broadcast area: Mountain Home, Arkansas
- Frequency: 99.7 MHz
- Branding: The Boot

Programming
- Format: Country
- Affiliations: ABC News Radio; Premiere Networks; Westwood One

Ownership
- Owner: Mountain Lakes Broadcasting Corp.

History
- First air date: 1994 (as KMAC)
- Former call signs: KMAC (1988–2012)

Technical information
- Licensing authority: FCC
- Facility ID: 14066
- Class: C2
- ERP: 50,000 watts
- HAAT: 150 meters (490 ft)
- Transmitter coordinates: 36°35′34″N 92°28′21″W

Links
- Public license information: Public file; LMS
- Webcast: Listen Live
- Website: KBOD Online

KBOD (99.7 FM, The Boot) is a radio station broadcasting a country music format. Licensed to Gainesville, Missouri, United States, the station is currently owned by Mountain Lakes Broadcasting, Corp.

== History ==
On March 1, 2012, KMAC changed their format from active rock to sports, branded as "ESPN Arkansas", with programming from ESPN Radio. On October 5, 2012, KMAC changed their call letters to KBOD. In December, 2012 the station changed its format to country music as "99.7 The Boot".
