= KWRK (FM) =

Country music radio station in Window Rock, Arizona, United States

- Window Rock, Arizona; United States
- Frequency: 96.1 MHz
- Branding: Capital Country 96.1 & 99.5

Programming
- Format: Country music
- Affiliations: Compass Media Networks

Ownership
- Owner: The Navajo Nation
- Sister stations: KTNN, KTNN-FM, NNTV5

History
- Call sign meaning: Window Rock

Technical information
- Licensing authority: FCC
- Facility ID: 66147
- Class: C1
- ERP: 100,000 watts
- HAAT: 178 meters (584 ft)
- Transmitter coordinates: 35°33′36.1″N 109°06′32.3″W
- Repeater: 99.5 KCAZ (Rough Rock)

Links
- Public license information: Public file; LMS
- Webcast: Listen live
- Website: capitalcountryfm.com

KWRK (96.1 FM) is a radio station licensed to Window Rock, Arizona, United States. The station is owned by The Navajo Nation. It airs a country music format.

The station was assigned the KWRK call letters by the Federal Communications Commission on February 1, 1991.
