= KCTT-FM =

Radio station in Yellville, Arkansas

- Yellville, Arkansas; United States
- Broadcast area: Mountain Home, Arkansas
- Frequency: 101.7 MHz
- Branding: Classic Hits 101.7

Programming
- Format: Classic hits
- Affiliations: ABC News Radio

Ownership
- Owner: Mountain Lakes Broadcasting Corp.

History
- First air date: 1980

Technical information
- Licensing authority: FCC
- Facility ID: 178
- Class: A
- ERP: 6,000 watts
- HAAT: 87 meters (285 ft)
- Transmitter coordinates: 36°17′18″N 92°30′37″W

Links
- Public license information: Public file; LMS
- Webcast: Listen Live
- Website: ktlo.com

KCTT-FM (101.7 MHz) is a radio station licensed to Yellville, Arkansas, United States. The station airs a Classic hits format and is currently owned by Mountain Lakes Broadcasting Corp.
