= KWSS-LP =

Coordinates: 33.5964°N 112.0224°W

- Scottsdale, Arizona; United States
- Broadcast area: Phoenix–Scottsdale, Arizona
- Frequency: 93.9 MHz

Programming
- Format: Community radio

Ownership
- Owner: KWSS Radio

History
- Former frequencies: 106.7 FM (2005–2013)

Technical information
- Licensing authority: FCC
- Facility ID: 134485
- Class: L1
- ERP: 3 watts
- HAAT: 251.0 meters (823.5 ft)
- Repeater: 94.5 KOOL-HD2 (Phoenix)

Links
- Public license information: LMS
- Webcast: Listen Live TuneIn Link Listen Live Links on Home Page
- Website: kwss.org

KWSS-LP is a non-commercial low-power FM radio station licensed to Scottsdale, Arizona, United States, and serving the Phoenix–Scottsdale area. Originally broadcasting on 106.7 FM, the station now broadcasts at 93.9 FM. KWSS went on the air January 2005 and is an alternative/indie pop format radio station with an emphasis on local and indie music. With studios located in Scottsdale, and transmitter in central Phoenix, KWSS broadcasts 24 hours a day. Aside from the alternative music format, KWSS carries news and information programs such as Democracy Now! from the Pacifica Foundation, The Lopsided World of L with Jonathan L, Radio Italia, and The Director's Cut. KWSS was awarded The Phoenix New Times Best Alt station for 2011, 2012, 2013, 2014, and 2016. In July 2020 The Phoenix New Times also named KWSS one of the 11 best radio stations in Phoenix. It airs a community radio format.

== See also ==
- List of community radio stations in the United States
