= KFTT =

- Bagdad, Arizona; United States
- Frequency: 107.7 MHz

Programming
- Format: Defunct (formerly Oldies)

Ownership
- Owner: Murphy Broadcasting; (Smoke and Mirrors, LLC)

History
- First air date: 2001 (as KBJU at 103.1)
- Last air date: January 30, 2019
- Former call signs: KBJU (1998–2002); KRCI (2002–2005)
- Former frequencies: 103.1 MHz (2001–2011)
- Call sign meaning: K-FaT T

Technical information
- Licensing authority: FCC
- Facility ID: 77750
- Class: C3
- ERP: 1,000 watts
- HAAT: 381 meters (1250 feet)
- Transmitter coordinates: 34°33′25″N 113°16′00″W

Links
- Public license information: Public file; LMS

KFTT (107.7 FM, "K-Fat 107.7") was a radio station licensed to serve Bagdad, Arizona. The station was owned by Murphy Broadcasting and licensed to Smoke and Mirrors, LLC. It aired an oldies music format.

The station was assigned the KFTT call letters by the Federal Communications Commission (FCC) on August 26, 2005.

On July 7, 2011, KFTT moved from 103.1 FM to 107.7 FM.

On February 1, 2013, KFTT changed their format from adult hits to oldies. (info taken from stationintel.com)

On February 13, 2017, KFTT went silent. (info taken from stationintel.com)

On April 1, 2017, KFTT returned to the air with oldies, branded as "K-Fat 107.7". (info taken from stationintel.com)

The station's owners surrendered KFTT's license to the FCC on January 30, 2019. The FCC cancelled the license on February 1, 2019.
