= KNOT =

Radio station in Prescott, Arizona

Coordinates: 34°32′42″N 112°26′46″W

- Prescott, Arizona; United States
- Broadcast area: Flagstaff-Prescott, Arizona
- Frequency: 1450 kHz
- Branding: Arizona Shine

Programming
- Format: Contemporary Christian

Ownership
- Owner: Roger and Nancy Anderson; (The Sanctuary International, Inc.)

History
- First air date: 1957

Technical information
- Licensing authority: FCC
- Facility ID: 52000
- Class: C
- Power: 1,000 watts
- Translators: 103.9 K280GH (Prescott), 107.9 K300CI (Flagstaff)

Links
- Public license information: Public file; LMS
- Webcast: Listen Live
- Website: arizonashine.org

KNOT (1450 AM) is a radio station licensed to Prescott, Arizona. Its signal is relayed on FM translators K280GH (103.9) Prescott, Arizona and K300CI (107.9) Flagstaff, Arizona. In October 2015 KNOT changed their format from oldies to Contemporary Christian music, branded as "Arizona Shine".
