= 940 AM =

AM radio frequency

The following radio stations broadcast on AM frequency 940 kHz: 940 AM is a Mexican and Canadian clear-channel frequency. XEQ Mexico City is the dominant Class B clear channel station on 940 kHz. See also List of broadcast station classes. CFNV in Montreal, Quebec, is a Class A station.

== In Argentina ==
- Excelsior in Monte Grande, Buenos Aires.
- LRH200 in Chajarí, Entre Ríos.
- LRJ241 Dimensión in San Luis.

== In Canada ==
Bold print of Call Letters indicates Class A

Call sign	City of license	Daytime power (kW)	Nighttime power (kW)	Transmitter coordinates
CBDK	Teslin, Yukon	0.04	0.04	60.1669°N 132.728°W
CFNV	Montreal, Quebec	50	50	45.3928°N 73.6992°W
CJGX	Yorkton, Saskatchewan	50	10	51.206389°N 102.336111°W

== In Mexico ==
Stations in bold are clear-channel stations.

- **XEQ-AM** in Iztapalapa, Mexico City - 30 kW, transmitter located at 19.360217°N 98.992194°W
- XEMMM-AM in Mexicali, Baja California

== In the United States ==
Call sign	City of license	Facility ID	Class	Daytime power (kW)	Nighttime power (kW)	Unlimited power (kW)	Transmitter coordinates
KDIL	Jerome, Idaho	161412	B	0.41	0.142		42.727222°N 114.626944°W
KGMS	Tucson, Arizona	53592	B	1	0.25		32.200833°N 111.018056°W
KIXZ	Amarillo, Texas	9308	B	5	1		35.154722°N 101.757778°W
KKNE	Waipahu, Hawaii	14937	B			10	21.445278°N 158.063611°W
KMER	Kemmerer, Wyoming	10335	D	0.24	0.15		41.799444°N 110.545556°W
KPSZ	Des Moines, Iowa	58533	B	10	5		41.476389°N 93.373889°W
KSWM	Aurora, Missouri	167	D	1	0.025		36.994167°N 93.716111°W
KTFS	Texarkana, Texas	33542	D	2.5	0.011		33.407778°N 94.045833°W
KVSH	Valentine, Nebraska	26612	D	5	0.019		42.865°N 100.518611°W
KWBY	Woodburn, Oregon	165	B	10	0.2		45.176944°N 122.849444°W
KYNO	Fresno, California	18407	B	50	50		36.488889°N 119.325833°W
WADV	Lebanon, Pennsylvania	20401	D	1	0.005		40.372778°N 76.364722°W
WCIT	Lima, Ohio	1062	D	0.25	0.006		40.7225°N 84.084444°W
WCPC	Houston, Mississippi	71291	D	31	0.007		33.928611°N 89.009722°W
WECO	Wartburg, Tennessee	43778	D	5	0.016		36.096667°N 84.591944°W
WFAW	Fort Atkinson, Wisconsin	24446	B	0.5	0.55		42.906667°N 88.751667°W
WGRP	Greenville, Pennsylvania	25227	D	1	0.002		41.385278°N 80.409167°W (daytime); 41.386111°N 80.409722°W (nighttime)
WIDG	St. Ignace, Michigan	42146	D	5	0.004		45.862222°N 84.781944°W
WINE	Brookfield, Connecticut	15389	D	0.68	0.004		41.493056°N 73.429167°W
WINZ	Miami, Florida	51977	B	50	10		25.96°N 80.270278°W
WIPR	San Juan, Puerto Rico	53861	B	10	10		18.426667°N 66.141389°W
WKGM	Smithfield, Virginia	73160	B	10	3.1		36.954444°N 76.63°W (daytime); 37.0975°N 76.671111°W (nighttime)
WKYK	Burnsville, North Carolina	40247	B	4.6	0.25		35.925556°N 82.272222°W
WLQH	Chiefland, Florida	72200	D	0.78	0.015		29.515278°N 82.884722°W (daytime); 29.515°N 82.884722°W (nighttime)
WMAC	Macon, Georgia	46998	B	50	10		32.885°N 83.730556°W
WMIX	Mount Vernon, Illinois	73096	B	5	1.5		38.370556°N 88.923333°W (daytime); 38.354167°N 89.008056°W (nighttime)
WNRG	Grundy, Virginia	70347	D	5	0.014		37.302222°N 82.117778°W
WXNK	Shell Lake, Wisconsin	10532	D	1			45.693333°N 91.965833°W
WQVR	Webster, Massachusetts	50232	D	1	0.004		42.054722°N 71.833056°W (daytime); 42.054722°N 71.833333°W (nighttime)
WYLD	New Orleans, Louisiana	60707	B	10	0.5		29.899167°N 90.004722°W
