= 1971 in radio =

The year 1971 in radio involved some significant events.

== Events ==
- 2 January: A ban on radio and television cigarette advertisements goes into effect in the United States.
- 3 January: Open University begins broadcasts on the BBC in the United Kingdom.
- 5 January: FIP (France Inter Paris) begins broadcasting from Paris on 514 m (585 kHz).
- 19 January: Moscow Radio broadcasts criticism of the Sultan of Oman in Arabic. One of the accusations against him is that he allowed the setting up of a radio station called "Voice of the Free South" in opposition to the People's Democratic Republic of Yemen.
- 14 February: All of ABC Radio's FM stations change call letters, all on the same day:
  - WABC-FM in New York becomes WPLJ, for White Port & Lemon Juice.
  - KABC-FM in Los Angeles becomes KLOS, for Los Angeles.
  - KGO-FM in San Francisco becomes KSFX, for San Francisco (now KOSF).
  - KQV-FM in Pittsburgh becomes WDVE, for a D o V E, the symbol of peace.
  - WXYZ-FM in Detroit becomes WRIF, for a guitar "R I F F" (legend goes that the calls were meant for WLS-FM to symbolize the cities' jazz scene).
  - WLS-FM in Chicago becomes WDAI (supposedly meant for WXYZ-FM to celebrate the Detroit Auto Industry; it had no meaning in Chicago).
  - KXYZ-FM in Houston becomes KAUM (today KHMX), meaning "Aumm", in Meditation terms; corresponding to Hippie meditative actions.
- 20 February: The U.S. Emergency Broadcast System sends an erroneous warning; many radio stations just ignore it, while WOWO in Fort Wayne takes it seriously and interrupts programming for 20 minutes.
- 2 March: 8HA is launched in Alice Springs, Northern Territory, Australia.
- 18 March: Prambors FM is launched in Jakarta, Indonesia.
- 26 March: Sheikh Mujibur Rahman declares Bangladesh's independence in a radio message.
- 1 April: Bayern 3, a public radio station owned and operated by Bayerischer Rundfunk, is launched in West Germany.
- 10 May: Members of the Front homosexuel d'action révolutionnaire (FHAR) interrupt a live radio broadcast on France's RTL, in which controversial presenter Menie Grégoire is introducing a phone-in on the subject of homosexuality.
- 24 May: U.S. Senator Clifford Case introduces Senate Bill 18, to remove funding for Radio Free Europe and Radio Liberty from the CIA's budget.
- 15 July: DXDB Radyo Bandilyo, an AM radio station owned by the Roman Catholic Diocese of Malaybalay, is launched in the Philippines.
- 19 September: MBC FM4U, South Korea's second FM station, is launched.
- 2 November: Radio Waikato begins broadcasting in Hamilton, New Zealand, on 954 kHz AM.
- 19 November: Triple M Central Coast begins broadcasting from Gosford, New South Wales, Australia, under the name 2GO.
- December: WNBC in New York lures Don Imus and his Imus in the Morning program away from WGAR (AM) in Cleveland (now WHKW); WGAR replaces him with fellow shock jock John Lanigan.
- date unknown
  - Radio Malaysia becomes the first radio station in Malaysia to broadcast 24 hours a day, nationwide.
  - The FM- and TV-mast Helsinki-Espoo, the third highest structure in Finland, begins transmission.
  - WLOL-FM and KSJN, both in Minneapolis, Minnesota, participate in "quadcast" (quadraphonic) experiments.
  - Sergiu Celibidache becomes conductor of the Stuttgart Radio Orchestra.
  - David McCallum Sr. ends his tenure as leader of Mantovani's orchestra.

== Debuts ==
- January 18 – La Case Trésor, presented by Guy Lux, is broadcast for the first time in France (runs until 1976).
- May 3 - All Things Considered, NPR's flagship news program, broadcasts for the first time.
- October – Odd Grythe begins hosting Husker du..., an entertainment show for the elderly, for the Norwegian Broadcasting Corporation.
- November 7 – WCCI-FM in Savanna, Illinois signs on at 100.1 FM. The station will later move to 100.3 FM.
- December – KOEL-FM, licensed to Oelwein, Iowa, signs on the air at 92.3 FM. Its initial format is country music.
- date unknown
  - Bill Ballance begins hosting the Feminine Forum radio show on KGBS in Los Angeles
  - The Music of the NOW Man is launched on the American Forces Network in the Far East.
  - KRWC 1360 AM in Buffalo, MN signs on for the first time.

== Births ==
- January 9 – Angie Martinez, American radio personality
- January 20 – Pixie McKenna, Irish doctor, radio and TV presenter
- April 16
  - High Pitch Eric, member of the Wack Pack from radio's The Howard Stern Show
  - Selena, US Latin singer and radio personality (died 1995)
- May 20 – Chris Booker, American radio and television personality.
- May – Frank Brinsley, host of The Frank Show
- June 10 – Kyle Sandilands, Australian radio presenter
- June 23 – Alan Cox, American comedian and radio personality, currently on WMMS in Cleveland, Ohio
- July 21 – Nuno Markl, Portuguese comedian and radio host
- July 30 – Tom Green, Canadian comedian and talk show host
- August 23 – Hugh Douglas, former NFL player, regular personality on Philadelphia sports radio station WIP
- August 26 – Thalía, Mexican singer, actress and radio presenter
- October 13 – Billy Bush, radio personality, co-host of TV show Access Hollywood, first cousin of George W. Bush
- October 20 – Dannii Minogue, Australian singer and radio presenter
- December 17 – Alan Khan, South African radio DJ

== Deaths ==
- January 7 – Richard Kollmar, 60, actor and Broadway producer.
- January 13 – Henri Tomasi, 69, French composer and conductor, one of the first radio conductors and a pioneer of "radiophonic" music
- March 16 – Bebe Daniels, 70, US actress, writer, producer and radio personality (Life with the Lyons)
- July 6 – Louis Armstrong, 69, African-American jazz musician, actor, singer, radio and TV personality
- July 11 – Carleton G. Young, 64, American radio and television actor
- October 3 – Seán Ó Riada, 40, Irish composer, former music director at Radio Éireann and presenter of Our Musical Heritage
