= KNST =

News/talk radio station in Tucson, Arizona

- Tucson, Arizona; United States
- Broadcast area: Tucson metropolitan area
- Frequency: 790 kHz (HD Radio)
- Branding: NewsTalk AM 790

Programming
- Format: Conservative talk
- Affiliations: Fox News Radio; Premiere Networks

Ownership
- Owner: iHeartMedia; (iHM Licenses, LLC)
- Sister stations: KHUD; KMMA; KOHT; KRQQ; KTZR; KXEW

History
- First air date: October 1, 1958
- Former call signs: KCTU (1957, CP); KRTU (1957–1958); KCEE (1958–1992); KWFM (1992–1993)
- Call sign meaning: "News, Sports, Talk"

Technical information
- Licensing authority: FCC
- Facility ID: 53589
- Class: B
- Power: 5,000 watts (day); 500 watts (night)
- Transmitter coordinates: 32°14′54″N 111°00′30″W

Links
- Public license information: Public file; LMS
- Webcast: Listen live (via iHeartRadio)
- Website: knst.iheart.com

KNST (790 AM) is a commercial radio station licensed to Tucson, Arizona, United States, and serves the Greater Tucson region. Owned by iHeartMedia, it features a conservative talk format, with studios and offices located on Oracle Road, north of Downtown Tucson.

KNST's transmitter is sited in West Tucson, off North Silverbell Road near North Grant Road.

== History ==
=== KCEE history ===
The first station on 790 AM in Tucson, Arizona, was KCEE, which signed on the air on October 1, 1958. It was owned by the Associated Broadcasters of Arizona and first began as a daytimer. It was powered at only 250 watts and had to leave the airwaves at sunset. By the early 1960s, the station got a boost to 5,000 watts by day and 500 watts at night.

In 1966, Strauss Broadcasting purchased KCEE. In 1967, Strauss added an FM station, KCEE-FM 96.1. At first the FM station simulcast AM 790, but later switched to beautiful music. In the 1970s, KCEE was a full service station, playing middle of the road music and airing NBC Radio News. In 1980, KCEE was sold to a company calling itself "790, Incorporated". The FM station was sold to Lotus Communications, becoming KTKT-FM, a companion to KTKT.

=== KNST history ===
former logo

The 940 frequency in Tucson first went on the air on August 10, 1963, as KHOS. From its sign on until the late 1970s, it was a country music station. From 1978 to 1981, it was soft rock KMGX "Magic 94". With music listening moving to FM radio, the station's owner, Grabet Radio Enterprises, wanted to make a change. In July 1981, AM 940 switched to a news/talk format, taking the KNST call letters. A few years later, 940 AM was sold to Nationwide Communications, a subsidiary of Nationwide Insurance. KNST carried talk shows from ABC Talkradio, broadcasting on 940 AM until it was moved to 790 AM on April 4, 1993. The 790 frequency has more power and a larger coverage area. Today, 940 AM is the home of KGMS, a Christian radio station.

On March 17, 1997, the Federal Communications Commission announced that eighty-eight stations had been given permission to move to newly available "Expanded Band" transmitting frequencies, ranging from 1610 to 1700 kHz, with KNST authorized to move from 790 to 1700 kHz. However, the station never procured the Construction Permit needed to implement the authorization, so the expanded band station was never built.

Nationwide later sold its Tucson stations, including KNST, to Tucson Radio Partners, which in turn was absorbed by Prism Radio and then Clear Channel Communications in the 1990s. KNST was the radio flagship station for University of Arizona men's basketball and football play-by-play from about 1984 until 2004, when the broadcasts moved to all-sports KCUB, branded as "1290 The Source".

On November 28, 2011, co-owned KTZR-FM 97.1 flipped to a simulcast of KNST, giving its talk audience the opportunity to hear the station on the FM dial. It changed its call letters to KNST-FM. Two years later, the simulcast ended. KNST-FM switched to a country music format, while conservative talk continued on KNST AM.

== Programming ==
KNST simulcasts both the morning and afternoon programs of KFYI in Phoenix, hosted by James T. Harris and Garret Lewis, respectively. The remainder of the schedule consists of nationally syndicated conservative talk shows, largely sourced from Premiere Networks. Because Arizona does not observe daylight saving time, syndicated programs air on a one-hour recorded delay from mid-March to early November.
