= KSZR =

Radio station in Oro Valley, Arizona

- Oro Valley, Arizona; United States
- Broadcast area: Tucson, Arizona
- Frequency: 97.5 MHz
- Branding: 97-5 The Vibe

Programming
- Format: Classic hip hop
- Affiliations: Compass Media Networks

Ownership
- Owner: Cumulus Media; (Radio License Holding CBC, LLC)
- Sister stations: KCUB, KHYT, KIIM-FM, KTUC

History
- First air date: 1992 (as KRKN)
- Former call signs: KVNM (1991–1992); KRKN (1992–1994); KCDI (1994–1996); KTSS (1996–1996); KSJM (1996–1998); KOAZ (1998–2003)

Technical information
- Licensing authority: FCC
- Facility ID: 39734
- Class: A
- ERP: 6,000 watts
- HAAT: 93 meters (305 ft)
- Transmitter coordinates: 32°19′45″N 111°3′40″W

Links
- Public license information: Public file; LMS
- Webcast: Listen Live
- Website: 975thevibe.com

KSZR (97.5 FM) is a radio station serving Tucson, Arizona, United States. It is licensed to broadcast from Oro Valley, Arizona, (a northern suburb of Tucson), but its reception is generally above average in most areas of Tucson. It is owned by Cumulus Media. Its studios are located north of downtown Tucson, and the transmitter is in Marana, Arizona.

== History ==
=== Rock (1991–1994) ===
Its first days on the air as KRKN were as a satellite based rock station.

=== Country (1994–1996) ===
In 1994, KRKN's call letters were changed to KCDI. As KCDI, the station was known as "CD Country" and played satellite delivered country music.

=== Rhythmic Top 40 (1996–1998) ===
In 1996, KCDI became KSJM, and was known as "Power 97.5". Power played a mix of hip hop, Spanish, and Top 40 music, (today's Rhythmic Top 40) and received high ratings, which competed with KOHT. Power was the first station in Tucson to play Rhythmic Top 40 over the FM airwaves.

Former logo under The Oasis branding

After about two years, Citadel Broadcasting purchased the station from locally owned Slone Broadcasting.

=== Smooth jazz (1998–2001) ===
In 1998, Citadel turned Power 97.5 to a smooth jazz station. It was known as 97-5 The Oasis. The call letters became KOAZ.

=== Country (2001–2002) ===
Due to low ratings and a lack of interest, the smooth jazz format was scrapped for a Country format known as "Cat Country" in 2001. This seemed to be a response to Clear Channel Communications' addition of a country station to Tucson, 92.9 Coyote Country (KOYT)(Today's KHUD). Clear Channel's plans in creating Coyote Country were to take away enough listeners from long-dominant KIIM-FM 99.5 (who coincidentally enough is also owned by Citadel), who has consistently been number one in the Tucson Arbitron ratings. Both Cat Country and Coyote Country failed.

=== Hot adult contemporary (2002–2004) ===
The station then changed to "Star 97.5" in 2002, a mix of pop, modern rock, and adult contemporary. The call letters became KSZR, and this format went on the longest. Ratings still failed to make a considerable difference, and Star 97.5 failed.

=== Adult hits (2004–2012) ===
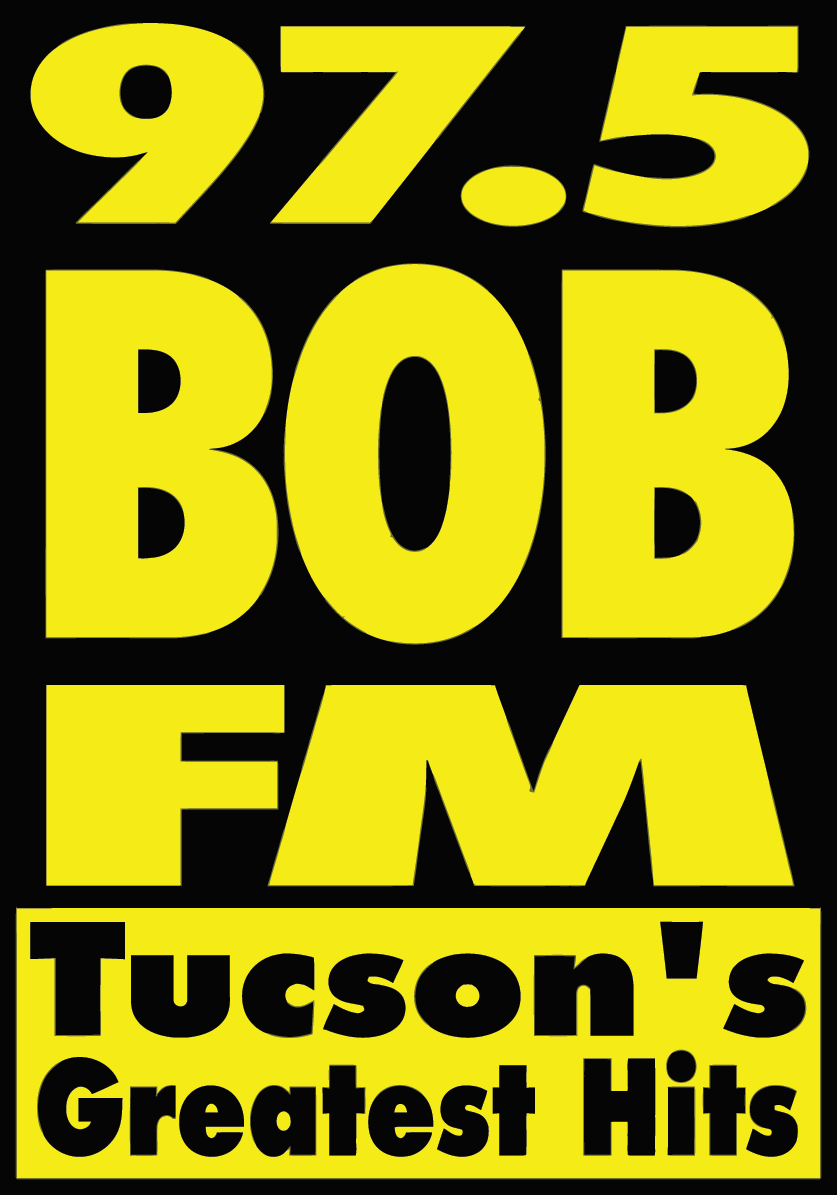
Former logo under the Bob FM branding

In November 2004, Citadel Broadcasting Corporation changed Star to Bob FM, an adult contemporary / variety hits format. Citadel merged with Cumulus Media on September 16, 2011.

=== Top 40 (2012–2015) ===
On February 3, 2012, at Noon, KSZR flipped to CHR as "i97.5". The final song on Bob FM was Bye Bye Bye by NSYNC, while the first song on "i97-5" was Party Rock Anthem by LMFAO.

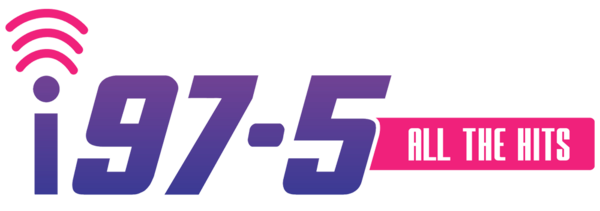
former logo as "i97-5"

=== Classic hip hop (2015–present) ===
On May 22, 2015, at Noon, KSZR flipped to classic hip hop as "97.5 The Vibe". The final song on "i97-5" was "Worth It" by Fifth Harmony, while the first song on "97.5 The Vibe" was "Hip Hop Hooray" by Naughty By Nature.
