= KCEE =

Radio station in Tucson, Arizona

- Tucson, Arizona; United States
- Broadcast area: Tucson metropolitan area
- Frequency: 690 kHz
- Branding: Reach Radio

Programming
- Format: Christian radio

Ownership
- Owner: Calvary Chapel of Tucson, Inc.

History
- First air date: September 23, 1953
- Former call signs: KEVT (1953–1981); KVOI (1981–2009)

Technical information
- Licensing authority: FCC
- Facility ID: 24590
- Class: D
- Power: 250 watts (day); 3.5 watts (night)
- Transmitter coordinates: 32°15′11″N 110°57′46″W
- Translator: 106.7 K294CR (Tucson)
- Repeaters: 88.9 KAIC (Tucson; tower in San Manuel, Arizona) (96.1-4) KLPX-HD4 (Tucson)

Links
- Public license information: Public file; LMS
- Webcast: Listen live
- Website: reachradiotucson.com

KCEE is a commercial radio station located in Tucson, Arizona, broadcasting on 690 AM. KCEE airs a Christian format and is owned by Calvary Chapel of Tucson, Inc.

By day, KCEE is powered at 250 watts; as 690 AM is a clear channel frequency assigned to Mexico and Canada, the station reduces power at night to 3 watts. It uses a non-directional antenna, with the transmitter located on North Los Altos Avenue near East Jacinto Street in Tucson. KCEE's programming is also heard on KAIC (88.9 FM), a station nominally licensed to Tucson but serving San Manuel, and on a translator (K294CR) at 106.7 FM in Tucson itself, relaying an HD Radio subchannel of KLPX (96.1 FM).

== History ==
=== KEVT ===
When we came here, there were five other stations. Most had an hour or two of Spanish-language programs and music a day. We decided to start a radio station that was all-Spanish.

— Linn Trowbridge, husband of KEVT founder Peter Trowbridge, in 2009

On April 15, 1953, the Federal Communications Commission (FCC) granted a construction permit to Tucson Radio, Incorporated, for a new daytime-only radio station to broadcast on 690 kHz in Tucson. The company consisted of two former employees of KOPO and an Ohio transplant. The station announced plans for studios and a transmitter site on Shawnee Avenue east of St. Mary's Hospital, but it soon found itself needing to buy additional land to ensure a buffer to surrounding properties.

The new station took the call letters KEVT and began broadcasting September 23, 1953, as Tucson's sixth radio station and its first all-Spanish-language outlet, serving an estimated audience of 40,000 Spanish speakers in the area. KEVT broadcast from a 280 ft (85 m) tower—Tucson's second-tallest at the time. Future governor Raúl Héctor Castro served as the station's attorney; daily broadcasts included English lessons from a University of Arizona professor, radio dramas and newscasts.

In 1956, the station attempted to gain full-time broadcasting capabilities by moving to 1600 kHz; the move was dismissed a year later. For a time, KEVT operated from a streetside studio at the corner of Congress Street and Church Avenue, which opened in 1957; a year later, after a burglary, a fire caused extensive damage and destroyed the station's phonograph collection and many business records.

KEVT was affected when a full-time competitor, KXEW, started on 1600 kHz in 1963. In January 1966, Peter Trowbridge, one of the founding members of Tucson Radio, resigned, and the company publicly announced its interest in a Spanish-language TV station and an English-language FM outlet. A bigger change was on the horizon when Alvin Korngold acquired the station, a transaction filed in February and approved in May. During the transaction, four announcers charged that Korngold had dismissed them and discriminated against them as Mexican Americans; three of the four were promptly rehired. Korngold had abandoned his antitrust law practice on Long Island to move to Tucson and run KEVT, which became one of the first U.S. stations to carry Spanish-language news direct from the Associated Press instead of having to translate English-language stories, using the shortwave transmissions from the AP. Korngold made a second attempt to take the station full-time, which the FCC denied in 1970.

Where Tucson Radio had failed in expanding to FM, Korngold would be successful. From the KEVT studios, relocated to Broadway Boulevard in 1967, KWFM (92.9 FM), a rock music station, started in March 1970. The next year, he started a Spanish-language station, KAMX, in Albuquerque, New Mexico; in 1972, he attempted to purchase interest and take operational control of KPHX in Phoenix, and he later bought KLAV in Las Vegas.

In 1980, Korngold announced the $3 million sale of KEVT and KWFM to Jay and Louise Heifetz, the son and daughter-in-law of violinist Jascha Heifetz; the sale attempt was dropped that June, as high interest rates dissuaded the potential buyers, who would have had to pay more in interest than they wanted for the purchase.

=== KVOI ===
In late 1980 and early 1981, KWFM and KEVT would be sold by Korngold to separate buyers. The FM was the first to find a purchaser: Sandusky Newspapers, which already owned Phoenix rock outlet KDKB. A more dramatic transformation, however, awaited KEVT. Abundant Life Ministries, owned by Grace Chapel, acquired the station for more than $1 million in 1981, proposing a format of "inspirational" Christian talk and teaching programming. To the dismay of many loyal listeners, KEVT broadcast for the final time on July 28, 1981. The next day, Abundant Life began its programming, with the station taking on new KVOI call letters, signifying "Voice of Inspiration".

New ownership brought yet another attempt to turn KVOI into a full-time operation, broadcasting day and night. Seeking to take advantage of a ruling that incentivized stations licensed to suburban localities, Abundant Life filed in 1982 to move KVOI to 700 kHz in Oro Valley, where it could broadcast with 10,000 watts during the day and 1,000 at night. Though granted, the move would never come to fruition. Meanwhile, KVOI began to focus itself more on contemporary Christian music as it increased in popularity during the decade. In 1989, the station was off the air for some time after a hit-and-run driver, who was said to be street racing and doing doughnuts, plowed into a guy wire, bringing down its 300 ft (91 m) tower.

In the 1990s, KVOI spawned an FM station, KGMS (97.1 FM), which soon assumed all of KVOI's music programming, while the AM station concentrated on mostly national Christian talk and teaching programs. During the 2000s, with KGMS having moved to its present dial position of 940 kHz, KVOI changed formats again, this time to news/talk.

=== KCEE ===
Good News Radio Broadcasting, owner of KVOI and KGMS, purchased KCEE (1030 AM) from Jim Slone, who had programmed an adult standards "pop classics" format on the station, in 2009. Martin immediately announced his plans to put the KVOI programming and call letters onto the 1030 frequency, which had a stronger signal at night.

KCEE retained the standards programming until Good News sold it to Calvary Chapel of Tucson in 2018 for $150,000. It was the fourth sale by Good News announced in one week: the company had divested KVOI to Bustos Media, KGMS to Tucson Christian Radio, and a K-Love-airing FM station to the Educational Media Foundation.

Calvary, which returned the station to religious programming, already owned a radio station licensed to Tucson, though not one that actually covered it. In December 2013, the church had purchased KAIC, a then-Air1 transmitter owned by the Educational Media Foundation, for $75,000.
