= XEQ =

XEQ may refer to various things:

== Radio call signs ==
The following broadcast stations in Mexico:

- XEQ-TV, channel 9
- XEQ-AM, 940 kHz
- XEQ-FM, 92.9 MHz

== Computing ==
- XEQ, a keyword in IBM's Job Control Language (JCL) for remote execution
- XEQ, a mnemonic for the execute instruction on the HP 3000 computer

== Other ==
- XEQ, the IATA code of Tasiusaq Heliport (Kujalleq).
