= KTZR =

KTZR may refer to:

- KTZR (AM), a radio station (1450 AM) licensed to serve Tucson, Arizona, United States
- KMMA (FM), a radio station (97.1 FM) licensed to serve Green Valley, Arizona, which held the call sign KTZR-FM from 2003 to 2011
- Bolton Field (ICAO code KTZR)
