= XEX =

XEX may refer to

== Radio stations ==
- XEAW-AM Station in Monterrey, Nuevo Leon that used the call sign from 1934 until the 1950s
- XEX-TDT (channel 14, virtual 5) in Altzomoni, Méx.
- XEX-AM, 730 kHz in Mexico City
- XEX-FM, 101.7 MHz in Mexico Cityll

== Other uses ==
- Xor–encrypt–xor (XEX), a (tweakable) mode of operation of a block cipher.
- Morimoto XEX, the Michelin Star-winning Tokyo restaurant of Masaharu Morimoto.
- .XEX, a type of file used for video games or other applications developed for the Microsoft Xbox 360 game console. It is designed to run on an Xbox 360 and is not meant to be opened on a PC.
