= KRQQ =

Coordinates: 32.249°N 111.117°W

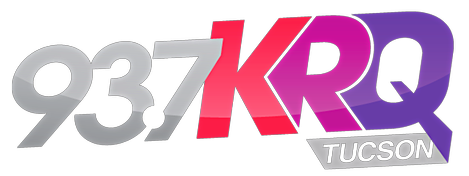
- Tucson, Arizona; United States
- Broadcast area: Tucson metropolitan area
- Frequency: 93.7 MHz (HD Radio)
- Branding: 93.7 KRQ

Programming
- Format: Contemporary hits
- Affiliations: Premiere Networks

Ownership
- Owner: iHeartMedia, Inc.; (iHM Licenses, LLC)
- Sister stations: KHUD, KMMA, KNST, KOHT, KTZR, KXEW

History
- First air date: February 1, 1971
- Former call signs: KXEW-FM (1971–1977)
- Call sign meaning: Rock music

Technical information
- Licensing authority: FCC
- Facility ID: 53591
- Class: C
- ERP: 93,000 watts
- HAAT: 613 meters (2,011 ft)

Links
- Public license information: Public file; LMS
- Webcast: Listen live (via iHeartRadio)
- Website: krq.iheart.com

KRQQ (93.7 FM) is a commercial radio station licensed to Tucson, Arizona, United States, known as "93.7 KRQ". It airs a contemporary hits format and is owned by iHeartMedia, Inc. Its studios are located north of downtown Tucson along Oracle Road.

KRQQ's transmitter is atop Tucson Mountain on West Hidden Canyon Drive in Tucson Estates. KRQQ broadcasts in HD Radio and is available online via iHeartRadio.

== History ==
The station signed on the air on February 1, 1971. Its original call sign was KXEW-FM, the sister station to KXEW 1600 AM, owned by Radio Fiesta, Inc. The two stations served Tucson's Latino community, airing a mix of Regional Mexican music and bilingual programming, especially in the evenings.

In 1977, the FM station was acquired by Grabet, Inc. Grabet also owned KMGX 940 AM (now KGMS). The new owners flipped the FM station to a Top 40 format, under the name of The New 94 KRQ. The call letters were changed to KRQQ. Until then, all contemporary hits stations in Tucson had been on the AM dial. Western Cities switched the radio station to top 40 in 1978. Dan McCoy was the first morning personality on 93.7 KRQ (KRQQ-FM) in Tucson, Arizona during the station’s early Top-40 / CHR era in 1978

McCoy joined KRQ in 1978, moving from WNDE in Indianapolis. As the original morning host, he helped establish the station’s high-energy personality format and local audience connection during the formative years of KRQ’s rise as one of Tucson’s leading hit-music stations.

In October 1980, McCoy transitioned into consulting, joining Blair Radio, where he worked with radio stations across the United States on programming, promotion, and market positioning. Dan Mc Coy's Real Name was Chet Tart. With the success of the Top 40 format, the station was sold to Nationwide Communications in the 1980s. According to radio industry trade publication Radio & Records, during the late 1980s, KRQQ was among the highest rated Top 40 stations in the U.S. The program director was Clarke Ingram, who came to KRQQ from nearby Top 40 station KZZP Phoenix. At one point, KRQQ had a 23 percent share of the total audience. The station's slogan in the 1990s was "Tucson's Only Hit Music Station!"

Nationwide later sold its Tucson stations to Tucson Radio Partners, which in turn was absorbed by Prism Radio. Clear Channel Communications acquired KRQQ in the 1990s. (Clear Channel changed its name to iHeartMedia in 2014.)

In 2001, following the September 11 attacks, the station made headlines when 25,000 listeners gathered in Tucson Electric Park to form a human flag.

KRQQ's former logo, used until 2012

== Programming ==
Weekdays begin with the syndicated Johnjay & Rich show. In middays, the station carries On Air with Ryan Seacrest and in evenings, the Tino Cochino Radio Show is heard. A variety of iHeartRadio personalities are voicetracked late nights and weekends. Syndicated weekend programs include American Top 40 with Ryan Seacrest, Most Requested Live, the iHeartRadio Countdown and On The Move with Enrique Santos.

Music on the station stays within the CHR genre. However, the playlist moves with the audience as the day progresses. During the daytime, the playlist consists of mostly mainstream CHR songs, Hot AC, and strong golds, being light on urban and rhythmic. During the late afternoon, evening, and overnight hours, the playlist is heavier on urban crossovers and rhythmic tracks, with mainstream songs mixed in.

== See also ==
- List of radio stations in Arizona
