= CFQR =

CFQR may refer to either of the following Canadian radio stations:

- CKBE-FM, which had the call sign CFQR-FM between 1966 and 2011
- CFQR (AM), a new radio station launched in 2017
