= The Frank Show =

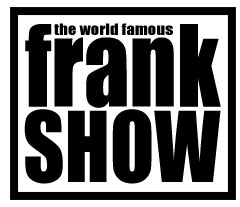
- Frank Show Logo
- Genre: Comedy, Talk
- Running time: 4 hours
- Country of origin: United States
- Home station: 96.1 KLPX
- Starring: Frank Brinsley; Kristine Levine; Brad
- Created by: Frank Brinsley
- Original release: 2002 – Present
- Website: The Frank Show

The Frank Show is a morning talk radio show that originates from KLPX in Tucson, Arizona. The show broadcasts mornings from 6 am to 10 am Mountain Standard Time on Classic rock station 96.1 KLPX in the Tucson area, which is owned by Lotus Communications. The show is available on demand as a daily podcast. Prior to its move to KLPX on June 28, 2010, The Frank Show was previously broadcast on a sister station of KLPX, Alternative rock station 102.1 KFMA.

Members of the Show:

Frank Brinsley – hosts the radio show.

Kristine Levine - co-host of the show

Rob H. - producer and co-host of the show

== Guest Listeners ==
At times, listeners from the Tucson area are known to frequently call in, or even come into the studio as guests. These are some of the people that have come into the studio, or called in from time to time.

Crazy Diane – A local from Tucson, she is the most well known of all the callers for her "crazy" life and her pride as a Native American. She claims to always have a ladder outside her window for Frank to climb in and have his way with her, but that is not as touched on anymore since Frank's marriage. One of her catchphrases include "In the spirit of Crazy Horse!"

Smiley – "The Stuttering Mexican", he came on the show for a skit called Handicapped Boxing, in which he beat Tic Tac in a boxing match. Due to a disability, he usually wears a glove on his bad hand to keep from digging his own nails into his palm. One thing he is known for is his collection of shot glasses.

Bingo – Another local from Tucson, Bingo is known for his drinking, which has caused him to look much older than he really is. He claims to be a songwriter, and have sold many of his songs to famous artists like Trace Atkins, and also claimed to have written "And The Thunder Rolls" by Garth Brooks, but has no legitimate proof of any of these claims. He is also known for his past with women and fathering different children, most of which he never sees.

Koji – He has called in a number of times and is known for the first "official Frank Show t-shirt", which depicted Gregg and Crazy Diane with Gregg's most memorable phrase "How did I fail when I got serviced?" Another shirt was made for Frank as a present, and only two other shirts have been made by Koji: one of Frank's "Shock Jock Illustrated" cover (which was given to Crazy Diane) and one of the quote "Tic Tac is an M-F-er." said by Buddy, which was also given to him as a gift as well. Koji's most recent appearance was during the show's Rock Band Contest under the alias of "Lewis Bawls" with his band Nocturne's Cry.

Leland – A caller with autism and a love for zombie movies, Leland first started appearing on the show when the members raised money for Leland and his friend to go to the studio's yearly concert event, KFMA Day. For a short while, a skit called "Leland's Movie Reviews" started where Leland would call in with his review of a movie he watched recently. Because of his inconsistency to keep up with the bit, the skit was canceled. After a falling out with Frank and the others, Leland hasn't called in much or appeared on the show.

== Guest Speakers of the Show ==
Herb Stratford- A movie expert Herb Stratford is a member of the Broadcast Film Critics Association and the Phoenix Film Critics Society He also was responsible for the restoration of the Fox Theatre.

MikeJ Tech Nerd- Comes in to the studio and gives the latest news in technology. Mike has been working with Scissors since 2001 developing the POSTAL video game series.

David Leighton - An award-winning journalist and historian for the Arizona Daily Star newspaper. He has also named several Tucson streets and the Nick C. Hall Ramada at Old Tucson Studios. His segment covers Tucson history and includes Tucson place names history

== Previous Members Of The Show ==
- Dave "Crazy Breath" Ashley – a comedian who was at one point a member of the show. He is currently a stand-up comic, who travels most of the U.S. Ashley quit the show to go back on the road and tour as a comic. He still has appearances on the show, usually by phone, but sometimes as an in-studio guest.
- Gregg (Elliot Gerringer) – an audio and voice producer who used to read the news; did promos, rejoiners and bumpers for the show; and offer some comments on the show. Left the show to start his own production company in late 2005. Gregg was often called "Big Jew Lips" because of his lips. Frank and Gregg would often have on-air disputes about little things, such as Gregg's inability to play along in situations. Speculation of Gregg leaving because of this teasing occurred after Gregg left, but was put to rest when Gregg revealed he left to start his own production company in Phoenix. Gregg continues to do voice work for the show.
- Sherm The Producer (Rick Berg) - A show producer and co-host of the Frank Show, who had been a morning show producer for 14 years. Sherm left KLPX in 2017.
- Stagz McNasty (Matthew Stagi) – co-host, self-proclaimed “Queen of Entertainment News” Was laid off in 2010 by the higher-ups.

== History Of The Show ==
The John and Frank Show replaced the John and John Show, which replaced the Ted Stryker show on KFMA.

In early to mid-2005, Tic-Tac returned to the show from being fired. He had previously been fired, allegedly when Gregg became a member of the show, due to money issues. When Gregg agreed to start voicing station promos for KFMA’s sister station KLPX, Tic-Tac then returned to the show.

Speculation began in 2005 when rumors started going around that the Frank Show would be going to Phoenix, on former alternative rock station 101.5 KZON, as a Howard Stern replacement. However, Frank announced on the show in early 2006 that the general manager of KZON wanted too much control over the show for Frank to move to Phoenix. He stated that the lack of content control by station management was a reason for staying in Tucson. The station later flipped formats to become Phoenix's Free FM affiliate. On June 10, 2010 the announcement was made that "The Frank Show" will be moving to the KFMA sister station, 96.1 KLPX in July 2010. The show now streams online at KLPX's website .

== Criticisms Of Other Radio Shows ==
Frank has said that Mancow uses a “fake radio voice” and is a phony.
