= KTKT =

Radio station in Tucson, Arizona

- Tucson, Arizona; United States
- Broadcast area: Tucson metropolitan area
- Frequency: 990 kHz
- Branding: La Buena 94.3FM & 990AM

Programming
- Language: Spanish
- Format: Adult hits

Ownership
- Owner: Lotus Communications; (Arizona Lotus Corp.)
- Sister stations: KCMT; KFFN; KFMA; KLPX; KMXZ-FM

History
- First air date: December 1949
- Former frequencies: 1490 kHz (1948–1956)
- Call sign meaning: original owners Thomas J. Wallace, Art Linkletter and Tom Breneman

Technical information
- Licensing authority: FCC
- Facility ID: 2744
- Class: B
- Power: 10,000 watts (day); 490 watts (night)
- Transmitter coordinates: 32°15′19.3″N 111°0′34.3″W
- Translator: 94.3 K232FD (Tortolita)

Links
- Public license information: Public file; LMS
- Webcast: Listen live
- Website: labuena943.com

KTKT (990 AM, "La Buena 94.3FM & 990AM") is a commercial radio station licensed to Tucson, Arizona, United States, serving the Tucson metropolitan area and much of Southern Arizona. Owned by Lotus Communications, it carries a Spanish language adult hits format. The KTKT studios and transmitter are both located in northwest Tucson; in addition to a standard analog transmission, KTKT is simulcast over low-power translator K232FD (94.3 FM) in Tortolita, and is available online.

== History ==
=== Early years ===
In December 1949, KTKT first signed on at 1490 AM. The station's construction permit was originally granted by the Federal Communications Commission (FCC) to Thomas J. Wallace Sr., Tom Breneman Sr., and Art Linkletter in 1948; the two "T's" in KTKT were for the two Toms, and the K was part of Linkletter's last name. Linkletter himself would go on to become a popular network television personality in the 1950s and 1960s. The station has kept the same call sign for its seven decades on the air.

After Breneman's untimely death, Wallace came to Tucson from Los Angeles to run the station. Wallace had started his radio career in Chicago where he was the host of a popular children's radio show, Uncle Walter's Dog House. He went on to produce other classic radio shows, including Blind Date with Arlene Francis, Kukla, Fran, and Ollie with Fran Allison, and The Red Skelton Show.

Because all the existing national radio networks already had affiliates in Tucson, KTKT became an independent station, and its programming was mostly music. For a time, KTKT was an affiliate of the short-lived Liberty Broadcasting System, formed around the play-by-play sportscasts of "The Old Scotsman", Gordon McLendon.

Wallace built his station on Elm Street, just west of Miracle Mile, in two war surplus military buildings which were moved onto the site. In the early 1950s, Chuck Blore became one of Tucson's most popular personalities on KTKT with his six-hour afternoon program, Let's Play Records. Blore was a creative radio personality, and went on to become one of radio's top programmers, starting Los Angeles' first Top 40 station, KFWB, in 1958, and later owned one of the top commercial production companies in Hollywood.

=== Adding an FM station ===
In March 1954, the Wallaces put Tucson's first FM station on the air, KTKT-FM 99.5.

Disappointed that classical music was not being heard in Tucson, Tom Wallace hired Jack Frakes, a drama teacher at Rincon High School, as KTKT-FM's first announcer and classical music programmer. KTKT-FM later changed its call sign to KFMM, standing for "FM on the Mountain" in anticipation of a move to Mount Bigelow that was never made. On Sundays, the two stations would simulcast to demonstrate something new: stereophonic sound on FM. The first stereo program in Tucson was on KTKT and KTKT-FM from 2 to 3 p.m. Sundays, played from the FM studio; the AM and FM stations broadcast separate audio channels.

=== Frequency move ===
Wallace made plans to move KTKT to a lower frequency which would give it a wider coverage area. He wanted to reach more Southern Arizona listeners who were moving to the suburbs. In 1958, KTKT moved to 990 kHz, with 10,000 watts of power and a directional antenna system, but because 990 AM is a clear channel frequency, it had to be a daytimer, only operating from sunrise to sunset. Engineer Nat Talpis supervised construction of two towers, located off West Grant Road near Silverbell, where the KTKT studios were located for many years.

Within minutes after KTKT signed off 1490 AM, a new station, KAIR signed on and continued playing the music which the audience was used to hearing on 1490. (KAIR had alleged that KTKT took too long to change frequencies.) Harold Peary, known to network radio audiences as The Great Gildersleeve, was one of the KAIR owners; while in Hollywood, he taped voice tracks for his new station which were mailed to Tucson for broadcast. On its new home at 990, KTKT was nicknamed "Color Channel 99". Wallace formally transferred KTKT ownership to the new Copper State Broadcasting Corporation, though it remained in the hands of the Wallace family. Tom Sr. was the boss, Tom Jr. handled engineering, and George Wallace also was an executive.

=== Top 40 music ===
When the AM station's ratings declined, Wallace hired a young Frank Kalil to do the programming, moving KTKT to a Top 40 sound. Kalil programmed the new rock and roll "Color Radio" style music and news format which quickly moved daytimer KTKT into Tucson's number one spot, where it remained into the early 1980s. From 1956 to 1966, Frankie Kalil was considered the "voice" of Tucson radio.

KTKT once broadcast minor league baseball games of the Tucson Sidewinders and Tucson Toros. In 1960, the Wallaces applied to begin operation at night with 1,000 watts.

=== Changes in ownership ===
Late in 1960, the family sold KTKT to the Leland Bisbee group. A new manager, Phil Richardson, took over, and financially the station began to prosper. The FM station was split off and purchased by Lee Little, owner of KTUC, and later became top-rated country music station KIIM-FM. The Leland Bisbee group sold KTKT to Lotus Communications in 1972.

In late 1985, as contemporary music listening moved to FM, Lotus dropped KTKT's live Top 40 format, to carry the Transtar Radio Networks' adult contemporary satellite feed from Los Angeles.

=== All-news, sports talk and Spanish ===
In the spring of 1989, KTKT dropped music altogether to become an all-news radio station, airing the audio feed of CNN Headline News.

In the early 1990s, KTKT was an affiliate of Sports Entertainment Network, a sports-oriented talk radio network, but due to low ratings switched back to CNN Headline News by early 1994. The station was also, for a time, the Tucson radio affiliate of the Los Angeles Dodgers. In 2001, the station became the Tucson radio affiliate of the Phoenix Suns.

In November 2004, KTKT dropped almost all sports and news programming to air a Spanish-language Norteño oldies format (that style being popular among many Latinos in Tucson). In 2005, KTKT dropped music and adopted the ESPN Deportes Radio Spanish-language sports format not long after it launched nationally. but would later drop it to air Spanish-language adult hits.
