= KNXN =

Religious radio station in Sierra Vista, Arizona

- Sierra Vista, Arizona; United States
- Frequency: 1470 kHz

Programming
- Format: Christian radio
- Affiliations: Wilkins Radio Network

Ownership
- Owner: Cochise Broadcasting LLC

History
- First air date: June 20, 1980
- Former call signs: KSVA (1980–1987); KMFI (1987–1993)

Technical information
- Licensing authority: FCC
- Facility ID: 57528
- Class: D
- Power: 2,500 watts (daytime); 40 watts (nighttime)
- Transmitter coordinates: type:city 31°32′55″N 110°14′40″W
- Translator: 96.9 K245DF (Sierra Vista)

Links
- Public license information: Public file; LMS
- Website: WilkinsRadio.com

KNXN (1470 AM) is a radio station licensed to Sierra Vista, Arizona. The station simulcasts KGMS 940 AM's Christian talk and teaching radio format, to expand that station's coverage to the southeast of Tucson. It airs programming from the Wilkins Radio Network.

By day, KNXN is powered at 2,500 watts non-directional. But at night, to protect other stations on 1470 AM from interference, it reduces power to only 40 watts. Programming is also heard on 50-watt FM translator K245DF at 96.9 MHz.

== History ==
KNXN originated with a 1978 application to build a new station on 1470 kHz in Sierra Vista. It was granted a construction permit the next year.

The station was assigned the call letters KSVA on March 31, 1980. It officially signed on the air on June 20, 1980.

The call sign changed to KMFI on August 1, 1987, and to KNXN on November 8, 1993.
