= Brinsley (name) =

Brinsley is both a given name and a surname. Notable people with the name include:

Given name:

- Brinsley Butler, 2nd Earl of Lanesborough (18th century), Grand Master of the Freemasons in Ireland
- Brinsley Forde (born 1952), Guyanese musician
- Brinsley Trench, 8th Earl of Clancarty (1911–1995), prominent ufologist
- Brinsley MacNamara (1890–1963), Irish novelist
- Brinsley Schwarz (musician) (born 1947), English guitarist and rock musician
- Edmund Brinsley Teesdale (1915–1997), Colonial Secretary of Hong Kong
- Richard Brinsley Knowles (1820–1882), British journalist
- Richard Brinsley Sheridan (1751–1816), Irish playwright and Whig statesman

Surname:

- Frank Brinsley (born 1971), American radio personality
- Ismaaiyl Brinsley, suspect in the 2014 killings of NYPD officers
