= Tortolita =

Tortolita may refer to:

- Tortolita Mountains, Arizona
- Tortolita, Arizona, a census-designated place
