= KAIC =

KAIC can refer to:

- KAIC (FM), a radio station (88.9 FM) licensed to serve Tucson, Arizona, United States
- One thousand Ampere Interrupting Capacity
- KaiC, a gene
- KAI Commuter, a railway operator in Indonesia
