= KHYT =

Classic hits radio station in Tucson, Arizona

- Tucson, Arizona; United States
- Broadcast area: Tucson metropolitan area
- Frequency: 107.5 MHz
- Branding: K-Hit 107.5

Programming
- Format: Classic hits

Ownership
- Owner: Cumulus Media; (Radio License Holding CBC, LLC)
- Sister stations: KCUB, KIIM-FM, KSZR, KTUC

History
- First air date: August 1993
- Former call signs: KYUD (1991–1996)
- Call sign meaning: "K-Hit"

Technical information
- Licensing authority: FCC
- Facility ID: 56053
- Class: C
- ERP: 82,000 watts
- HAAT: 620 meters (2,030 ft)
- Transmitter coordinates: 32°14′56″N 111°6′59″W

Links
- Public license information: Public file; LMS
- Webcast: Listen live; Listen live; Listen live (via iHeartRadio)
- Website: khit1075.com

KHYT (107.5 FM) is a commercial radio station licensed to Tucson, Arizona, United States, and serving the Tucson metropolitan area. Owned by Cumulus Media, with the license held by Radio License Holding CBC, LLC., it airs a classic hits format branded as "K-Hit 107.5". Studios are on West Roger Road, north of downtown Tucson.

KHYT's transmitter is sited at Tower Peak in the Tucson Mountains.

== History ==
KHYT was first assigned the AM frequency of 1330 kHz in the late 1960s as a daytime-only station serving Tucson. In 1980, owner Robert H. Scholz moved the city of license to South Tucson. That move, coupled with a new directional antenna, allowed the station nighttime authorization. After the sale of the station in the mid-1980s, the call sign was changed, allowing another station to pick up the KHYT call letters in 1995.

The new FM station on 107.5 MHz signed on the air in August 1993. At first, it had the call letters KCUB and was called K-Cub. It played a mix of current and recent country music as well as classic country. K-Cub was eventually moved to 1290 AM. FM 107.5 continued with its country format as KCRZ. It was bought by Rex Broadcasting in 1994 for $3.5 million.

In 1995, 107.5 changed its call letters to KHYT and flipped formats to classic rock hits. It used the name K-Hit 107.5. It played the top selling titles of the 1960s and 70s, with a rock music orientation. By 2000, the 60s music was reduced, focusing more on 1970s and 80s hits. In 2004, the name was changed to Rock 107.5, but the playlist and format stayed the same.

After a few years, the slogan changed back to "K-Hit 107.5." The playlist began adding a few pop and dance titles from such artists as Michael Jackson, Prince and Madonna to the classic rock hits. However, KHYT uses the same logo scheme in its advertising.

=== Sports ===
KHYT is the only FM radio station in Tucson that airs sports coverage. The station carries play-by-play of University of Arizona Wildcats football and basketball games live in FM stereo during their seasons.

== See also ==
- List of radio stations in Arizona
