= KMXZ-FM =

Adult contemporary radio station in Tucson, Arizona, United States

Coordinates: 32°14′56″N 111°6′59″W

- Tucson, Arizona; United States
- Broadcast area: Tucson metropolitan area
- Frequency: 94.9 MHz (HD Radio)
- Branding: 94.9 MIXfm

Programming
- Format: Adult contemporary
- Subchannels: HD2: Spanish hot AC "Exito"; HD3: Regional Mexican (KCMT simulcast); HD4: Sports (KFFN simulcast)
- Affiliations: Compass Media Networks; Premiere Networks

Ownership
- Owner: Lotus Communications; (Arizona Lotus Corp.)
- Sister stations: KCMT, KFFN, KFMA, KLPX, KTKT

History
- First air date: February 1972; 54 years ago (as KAYN)
- Former call signs: KAYN (1972–1973); KAIR-FM (1973–1978); KJYK (1978–1988)

Technical information
- Licensing authority: FCC
- Facility ID: 2434
- Class: C
- ERP: 96,500 watts
- HAAT: 572.4 meters (1,878 ft)

Links
- Public license information: Public file; LMS
- Webcast: Listen live
- Website: mixfm.com

KMXZ-FM (94.9 MHz, "94.9 MIXfm") is a commercial FM radio station in Tucson, Arizona. It is owned by Lotus Communications and broadcasts an adult contemporary format, switching to Christmas music for much of November and December. The studios and offices are on East Rosewood Drive.

KMXZ has an effective radiated power (ERP) of 96,500 watts. The transmitter site is on West Hidden Canyon Drive in Tucson Estates, atop Tower Peak in the Tucson Mountains. KMXZ broadcasts using HD Radio technology. Its digital subchannels carry several formats: HD2 is Spanish Hot Adult Contemporary, HD3 is Regional Mexican and HD4 is Sports as a simulcast of co-owned KFFN.

== History ==
=== Stereo 95 (1972) ===
The station signed on the air on in February 1972. It was licensed to the Graham Broadcasting Company, owned by Norman and Eva Graham. The original call sign was KAYN. "Stereo 95", however, only lasted three months.

=== KAIR-FM (1972–1978) ===
It went silent in May, and that fall, it was sold to Number One Radio, the Frank Kalil-owned company that also operated KAIR 1490 AM The new station signed back on the air on April 1, 1973 and became KAIR-FM. The two stations aired an easy listening format, featuring mostly instrumental cover versions of popular adult songs, Broadway and Hollywood show tunes.

=== K-Joy 95 (1978–1988) ===
The Surrey Broadcasting Company bought KAIR-AM-FM in 1978 and changed the FM callsign to KJYK as "K-Joy FM 95", continuing with an easy listening format. It was one of the stations that carried Chuck Cecil's "Swinging Years" for many years in Tucson. In 1984, KJYK was acquired by Citadel Broadcasting, which later sold it to Duchossois Communications.

=== Cloud 95 (1988–1995) ===
In 1988, KJYK became "Cloud 95" and then years later as "Cloud 94.9". It changed its call sign to KKLD in 1989 to match the branding. During this period, the station cycled through several owners. Behan Broadcasting bought it in 1992, only for it to be sold to Apogee Radio in 1994 and then to Journal Communications a year later. In the 1990s, the instrumental music was gradually scaled back and replaced by soft vocals.

=== 94.9 Mix FM (1995–present) ===
In May 1995, the call sign changed to KMXZ-FM and the format was flipped to Hot Adult Contemporary as "Mix FM". Over the years, the Hot AC sound was scaled back toward mainstream adult contemporary music.

In December 2007, KMXZ and Brad Behan of the Bobby and Brad Morning Show parted ways , with former KZPT afternoon drive personality Greg Curtis joining the morning show.

In July 2014, Journal announced that it had agreed to sell its broadcasting assets to the E. W. Scripps Company, and that both companies would spin off their publishing assets into a new company known as Journal Media Group. The transaction was completed in April 2015.

In January 2018, Scripps announced that it would sell all of its radio stations. In August 2018, Lotus Communications announced that it would acquire Scripps' Tucson and Boise clusters for $8 million. The deal closed on December 12 of that year.

== See also ==
- List of radio stations in Arizona
