= KOHT =

- Marana, Arizona; United States
- Broadcast area: Tucson metropolitan area
- Frequency: 98.3 MHz (HD Radio)
- Branding: Hot 98.3

Programming
- Format: Urban contemporary
- Affiliations: Premiere Networks

Ownership
- Owner: iHeartMedia, Inc.; (iHM Licenses, LLC)
- Sister stations: KHUD, KMMA, KNST, KRQQ, KTZR, KXEW

History
- First air date: 1981
- Former call signs: KOPO (1981–1985); KXMG (1985–1992)
- Call sign meaning: "Hot"

Technical information
- Licensing authority: FCC
- Facility ID: 8143
- Class: A
- ERP: 6,000 watts
- HAAT: 56 meters (184 ft)
- Transmitter coordinates: 32°27′9″N 111°5′11″W

Links
- Public license information: Public file; LMS
- Webcast: Listen live (via iHeartRadio)
- Website: hot983.iheart.com

KOHT (98.3 FM, "Hot 98.3") is a radio station licensed to Marana, Arizona, United States, serving the Tucson metropolitan area. Owned by iHeartMedia, it carries an urban-leaning rhythmic contemporary format with studios north of downtown Tucson along Oracle Road and transmitter near the Tortolita Mountains in unincorporated Pima County.

== History ==
KOHT has been a Rhythmic Top 40 station since the 1980s. It was first sold to Art Laboe in the 1990s and functioned in a rhythmic/urban format along with an occasional mix of Mexican hits. Laboe owned KOHT until 2001 when Clear Channel Communications purchased the station. It maintains an exclusive rhythmic/urban format today although no longer includes Mexican hits as it previously did.

Longtime program director and air talent R Dub! announced he was leaving the station in February 2007 to move to Recife, Brazil. However, in early March 2007, he was offered the Program Director position at KHHT Hot 92 in Los Angeles and opted for California instead. He continues his Slow Jams show, albeit now based in Los Angeles.

Fred Rico joined KOHT in March 2007 as Program Director, coming from Honolulu, Hawaii. Melissa Santa Cruz joined KOHT, holding the midday slot as of November 2007. She had previously hosted middays at 93.7 KRQ, and had once hosted at KOHT in the mid-1990s. Pablo Sato joined KOHT in January 2008 as the new morning and afternoon host.

Former logo; newer logo is similar, but is more clean-cut, removing the slogan.

As of January 18, 2010, Mojo In The Morning began syndication on 98.3 from Detroit as the new morning show. Mojo Morales had previously hosted mornings in Tucson with Besty Bruce on KRQ up until 2000, when Morales moved to Detroit. His morning show has been very successful in the Detroit area. In August 2013, Mojo was dropped, and KOHT became a charter affiliate of The Breakfast Club, based from New York on sister station WWPR-FM (Power 105.1). The Breakfast Club is mainly geared toward urban contemporary audiences, so KOHT was the only iHeartMedia-owned Rhythmic CHR to carry the show until May 12, 2016, when The Breakfast Club was added at Boston sister station WJMN.

Former talent that worked at KOHT have gone on to work at other media sources: Kid Corona (On-Air Personality), now works for CBS Radio's KALV-FM and KMLE in Phoenix, Ariz., David "Easy D" Leighton (Intern Producer), now works as a columnist for the Arizona Daily Star newspaper, in Tucson, Ariz., and Rolando Nichols (On-Air Personality), now works as a Network News Anchor at MundoFox.
