= KFFN =

Coordinates: 32°14′56″N 110°55′29″W

- Tucson, Arizona; United States
- Broadcast area: Tucson metropolitan area
- Frequency: 1490 kHz
- Branding: ESPN Tucson 1490 AM & 94.9 HD4

Programming
- Format: Sports
- Affiliations: ESPN Radio; Arizona Diamondbacks; Phoenix Suns

Ownership
- Owner: Lotus Communications; (Arizona Lotus Corp.)
- Sister stations: KCMT, KFMA, KLPX, KMXZ-FM, KTKT

History
- First air date: 1957 (as KAIR)
- Former call signs: KAIR (1957–1989); KJYK (1989–1995); KMXZ (4/1995-8/1995); KKND (1995–1996)

Technical information
- Licensing authority: FCC
- Facility ID: 2433
- Class: C
- Power: 1,000 watts unlimited
- Repeater: 94.9 KMXZ-HD4 (Tucson)

Links
- Public license information: Public file; LMS
- Webcast: Listen live
- Website: espntucson.com

KFFN (1490 AM) is a commercial radio station in Tucson, Arizona. It is owned by Lotus Communications and it broadcasts a sports radio format. KFFN airs syndicated programming from ESPN Radio.

KFFN is powered at 1,000 watts non-directional. Its transmitter is on East Bray Road in Tucson.

== History ==
Starting in 1949, the 1490 frequency in Tucson was the home of KTKT. To increase its listening area, KTKT received permission in 1956 from the Federal Communications Commission (FCC) to move to 990 kHz. When that was granted, it left 1490 open for a new station. .

In March 1956, under the ownership of William John Hyland III and Dawkins Espy, doing business as the Pima Broadcasting Company, KAIR received its construction permit but could not begin testing until KTKT moved to 990. The station signed on within minutes of KTKT's move to 990 and continued playing the music/news programming which the audience was used to hearing.

The station was characterized by a revolving door of owners at the start. James H. Duncan joined the Pima Broadcasting Co. in November 1956. Josh Higgins Radio Enterprises, soon renamed to Joe DuMond Radio Enterprises, bought the station a year later, and in the spring of 1959, the station was sold yet again, to Andrew J. Griffith, Jr., and Jerome K. McCauley, who formed KAIR Broadcasting; the station was operated by Freddie and Josephine Mays and struggled with a contemporary format and many business issues.

With the air time sales staff spending the majority of their time in a local bar, it was difficult at best to pay the bills and keep the station on the air. Midway through 1961, the crew and management walked out in what they perceived as a labor dispute. Thomas J. Wallace Jr., whose father Tom Sr. had helped start KTKT, returned to Tucson to manage KAIR, serving as a station manager, salesman, engineer and on-air talent. Wallace's management saved the station, which implemented a Christian format and used the slogan "I pledge prayer for KAIR, daily"; it broadcast from studios located on the second floor above the business offices at the Ramada Inn.

By the end of 1965, with no lasting appreciable growth in listenership or programming development over the four years the new format had been in effect, the station began to struggle. The owners, Freddie and Josephine Mays, were forced to cut their losses and sell the station.

By August 1966, KAIR was sold to Frankie Kalil at Kalil & Co., doing business as Number One Radio. Kalil, who had turned KTKT around and made it Tucson's ratings leader, worked his radio magic again and rolled out an easy listening winner, with a new slogan, "Drive with KAIR, Everywhere". The station remained competitive in the Tucson market until FM listening became more common. It raised its power from 250 to 1,000 watts in 1975.

In early 1978, the Surrey Broadcasting Company acquired KAIR, which also owned KJYK at 94.9 FM. In 1985, KAIR also adopted the KJYK calls and flipped to a contemporary hit radio format under the name Joy 1490.

In 1991, KJYK flipped to a rhythmic contemporary format—a first for the Tucson market—under the name Power 1490, and the station began broadcasting in AM stereo using the C-QUAM system. Despite being on AM, the station was highly ranked amongst both kids and teens; despite this, the station had poor advertising revenue.

On June 12, 1995, at 5 pm, after playing "It's So Hard to Say Goodbye to Yesterday" by Boyz II Men, the station stopped broadcasting in AM stereo system, and began stunting with a loop of "Push th' Little Daisies" by Ween. 24 hours later, the station flipped to an alternative rock format using the calls KNND and the new name 1490 The End. One year later, the station flipped to the current format, adopted the KFFN call letters, the "Fan" moniker, and became an ESPN Radio affiliate.

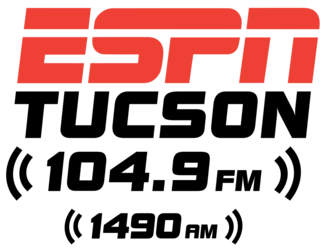
Logo when simulcasting on 104.9 FM

On March 17, 2011, KFFN began simulcasting on FM translator K285DL (104.9 FM).

KFFN is also an affiliate of the Arizona Diamondbacks.

Journal Communications and the E. W. Scripps Company announced on July 30, 2014 that the two companies would merge to create a new broadcast company under the E.W. Scripps Company name that will own the two companies' broadcast properties, including KFFN. The transaction was completed in 2015.

In January 2018, Scripps announced that it would sell all of its radio stations. In August 2018, Lotus Communications announced that it would acquire Scripps' Tucson and Boise clusters for $8 million. The deal closed on December 12 of that year.
