= CFQR (AM) =

Radio station in Montreal, Quebec, Canada

- Montreal, Quebec; Canada
- Broadcast area: Greater Montreal
- Frequency: 600 kHz
- Branding: CFQR 600

Programming
- Language: English
- Format: Classic hits; news/talk

Ownership
- Owner: RRR Media D-B-A 7954689 CANADA; (7954689 Canada Inc. (Operated by RRR Media))
- Sister stations: CFNV

History
- First air date: June 28, 2017; 9 years ago
- Call sign meaning: "Quebec Radio"

Technical information
- Class: B
- Power: 10,000 watts (daytime); 5,000 watts (nighttime)
- Transmitter coordinates: 45°23′34.08″N 73°41′53.16″W

Links
- Webcast: Listen live
- Website: cfqr600.com

CFQR (600 AM) is an English-language radio station in Montreal, Quebec.

== History ==
On November 9, 2012, the CRTC approved an application by 7954689 Canada Inc. to operate an English language commercial AM radio station in Montréal at 600 kHz (class B) with a transmitter power of 10,000 watts daytime and 5,000 watts nighttime.

On June 28, 2017, a test broadcast began on AM 600 by TTP Media, the same owners as CFNV. The call sign was announced as CFQR (no relation to the former CFQR-FM, now CKBE-FM).

On June 13, 2022, CFQR launched its morning drive program, Mornings Matter. The program was hosted by Jim Connell, a former host at CINW and CKMI-DT. In connection with the launch, CFQR stated that its programming would feature news, information, and talk, along with music from the 1970s, 1980s, and 1990s.

As of 2023, the station is 100% automated with no live programming.

In 2024, the Trent Out Loud podcast was added. The show features hip-hop and rnb from the 90s and 2000s. It mixes in entertainment news. It can be heard on weekdays 11 am to 12 midday.

The station is currently operated by RRR Media, which Phil Richards owns.

In January 2025, the Trent Out Loud show is no longer airing. It continues as a podcast. It has been replaced by a third hour of Kris Leblanc.

== Ownership ==
The radio station was owned by a numbered company, 7954689 Canada Inc. operating in Montreal, Quebec, Canada. It was equally controlled by:

- 4158695 Canada Inc. (Paul Tietolman)
- 9225-8318 Québec Inc. (Nicolas Tétrault)
- 6556027 Canada Inc. (Rajiv Pancholy)

The group is collectively known as TTP Media, which reflects the surnames of the three owners, Tietolman, Tétrault, and Pancholy.
