= XEW-AM =

Radio station in Mexico City

XEW-AM and XEW-FM
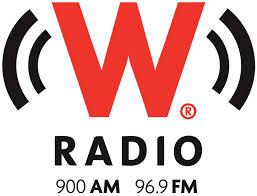

Mexico City; Mexico
- Broadcast area: Greater Mexico City
- Frequencies: XEW-AM: 900 kHz; XEW-FM: 96.9 MHz
- RDS: XEW-AM: WRADIO
- Branding: W Radio

Programming
- Format: Talk radio

Ownership
- Owner: Radiópolis; (Cadena Radiodifusora Mexicana, S.A. de C.V.)
- Sister stations: XEX-AM, XEQ-AM, XEQ-FM, XEX-FM

History
- First air date: XEW-AM: September 18, 1930; XEW-FM: October 1, 1975

Technical information
- Licensing authority: CRT
- Class: XEW-AM: A; XEW-FM: C1
- Power: XEW-AM: 100,000 watts
- ERP: XEW-FM: 51,190 watts
- HAAT: XEW-FM: 127.07 metres (416.9 ft)
- Transmitter coordinates: XEW-AM: 19°21′54.18″N 98°57′27.73″W; XEW-FM: 19.3945°N 99.1744°W

Links
- Webcast: Listen live
- Website: wradio.com.mx

XEW-AM (900 AM) and XEW-FM (96.9 FM) are commercial radio stations in Mexico City, Mexico, simulcasting a news/talk radio format branded as W Radio. XEW serves as the flagship for other "W Radio" stations around Mexico that carry some or all of its programs. The stations feature frequent news segments, talk and sports shows, and musical programming during overnights and weekends.

XEW-AM is a Class A clear channel station broadcasting at 100,000 watts, one of the highest powered AM stations in North America. The non-directional antenna is off Avenida Independencia in the La Magdalena Atlicpac neighborhood in La Paz. XEW-FM is a Class C1 station with an effective radiated power (ERP) of 51,190 watts.

== History ==
=== XEW-AM ===
XEW began regular broadcasts at 20:00 CST on September 18, 1930. Broadcasting from a room (later to become a proper studio) at the Olympia Cinema on 16 September Street in Mexico City, it initially was powered at only 5,000 watts. This was increased to 50,000 watts by 1934. With the installation of a new transmitter, the power became 250 kW by 1935 and remained there for more than 80 years. For much of its history, XEW-AM was the most powerful AM radio station in North America. On February 10, 2016, XEW-AM was approved to relocate its transmitter to a site in La Magdalena Atlicpac in La Paz. With the move, the power was reduced to 100,000 watts, still among North America's most powerful AM stations.

XEW was the first Mexico City station in Emilio Azcarraga Vidaurreta's Chain of the Americas. It was the forerunner to today's Televisa network, which still owned XEW-AM until the sale of their radio unit in 2020. XEW-AM originally was affiliated with the NBC Red Network and the NBC Blue Network. Its future sister stations would take affiliation with rival networks, XEQ-AM with CBS and XEX-AM with the Mutual Broadcasting System. As radio in Mexico evolved with the country's growth and more radio stations signed on, XEW-AM became flagship to the country's largest radio network. Several radio and television stations have derived their call signs from XEW radio and XEW television, all of them affiliated at one time or another with Televisa.

In the United States, the call letters for KXEW, a commercial AM radio station in Tucson, Arizona, were a tribute to 900 XEW. That station was owned by Pan American Radio Corporation and went on the air May 10, 1963. The call sign was chosen by its president and CEO, J. Carlos McCormick, because of his admiration of Azcarraga, whom he had met as a teenager during a 1950 visit to Mexico City.

=== XEW-FM ===
The FM frequency, 96.9, received its concession on April 28, 1962; it was not launched until the 1970s, and by the end of that decade, it carried a disco format. By 1981, it had changed to "Rock Stereo". On September 9, 1985, it was renamed "WFM" with an English rock and pop format, being the direct competition of XHSON-FM (then known as "Rock 101"). Among the DJs that conformed the station were Alejandro González Iñárritu, Martha Debayle and Charo Fernández.

After 14 years, in 1999, the station changed its name and format to "W Radical." It was directed by the former head of "Rock 101", Luis Gerardo Salas, airing electronic music and eurodance. By 2001, it returned to its former WFM format with the slogan "Frecuencia Adictiva." In late 2002, after the association of Televisa Radio and PRISA, management decided to simulcast the same programming on AM and FM. Thus XEW-FM became a news and talk outlet, albeit musical programming can still be heard on overnights and weekends when live sports broadcasts are not scheduled.

== Personalities ==
- Manuel "Maber" Bernal
- Emilio Tuero
- Juan Arvizu
- Luis Arcaráz
- Nicolás Urcelay
- Alfonso Ortiz Tirado
- Los Panchos
- Juan García Esquivel
- Mario Ruiz Armengol
- Maria Luisa Landín
- María Victoria
- Mario Moreno Cantinflas
- Germán Valdés "Tin-Tan"
- José Sabre Marroquín
- Agustín Lara
- Toña la Negra
- Angelines Fernández
- Carmen Rey
- Pedro Infante
- Jorge Negrete
- Pedro Vargas
- Gustavo Adolfo Palma
- Fernando Fernández
- Eulalio González "Piporro"
- Francisco Gabilondo Soler ("Cri-Cri")
- Hugo Avendaño, Amparo Montes
- Héctor Martínez Serrano
- Antonio Aguilar
- Paco Stanley
