= KCUB (AM) =

Coordinates: 32°16′37.3″N 110°58′52.3″W

- Tucson, Arizona; United States
- Frequency: 1290 kHz
- Branding: Wildcats Sports Radio 1290

Programming
- Format: Sports
- Affiliations: Westwood One Sports; Arizona Wildcats

Ownership
- Owner: Cumulus Media; (Radio License Holding CBC, LLC)
- Sister stations: KHYT; KIIM-FM; KSZR; KTUC

History
- First air date: August 1929 (as KVOA)
- Former call signs: KVOA (1929–1958); KCUB (1958–1989); KIIM (1989–1990)

Technical information
- Licensing authority: FCC
- Facility ID: 56051
- Class: B
- Power: 1,000 watts

Links
- Public license information: Public file; LMS
- Webcast: Listen live; Listen live; Listen live (via iHeartRadio)
- Website: www.wildcatsradio1290.com

KCUB (1290 kHz) is a commercial AM radio station located in Tucson, Arizona. KCUB is owned by Cumulus Media and airs a sports radio format. Its studios, offices and transmitter are co-located on Oracle Road in Tucson, north of downtown.

KCUB serves as the flagship radio station for the Arizona Wildcats via IMG Sports, airing their football and basketball games. KCUB was the former Tucson-area affiliate of the NFL's Arizona Cardinals (Cardinals games are now heard on KTZR). Its studios and transmitter are co-located on Oracle Road in Tucson, north of downtown.

The format includes programming from Westwood One Sports (including The Jim Rome Show), as well as local host Rich Herrera, who, in October 2020, began hosting the station's weekday afternoon show.

== History ==
In August 1929, KCUB was founded as KVOA. It was originally on 1260 kHz, with 500 watts, and owned by the Arizona Broadcasting Company. KVOA was Tucson's second radio station, going on the air three years after KTUC. KVOA was an affiliate of the NBC Red Network and carried its schedule of dramas, comedies, news, sports, soap operas, game shows and big band broadcasts during the Golden Age of Radio. By the 1940s, power was boosted to 1,000 watts and the station moved to 1290 kHz.

In September 1953, the owners put KVOA-TV on the air, also an NBC affiliate. Believing that TV would replace radio, the owners kept the TV station and sold off the radio station in 1958. The new owner, Sherwood R. Gordon, renamed it KCUB but kept the affiliation with NBC. In 1968, the station was sold to Rex Broadcasting, airing a country music format. In December 1989, the station became KIIM, sharing a call sign with KIIM-FM; the KCUB call sign returned in July 1990.

In 2001, KCUB was bought by Citadel Broadcasting, a forerunner of Cumulus Media, which switched it to a sports radio format.
