= KCMT =

Radio station in Tucson, Arizona

- Green Valley, Arizona; United States
- Broadcast area: Tucson metropolitan area
- Frequency: 92.1 MHz (HD Radio)
- Branding: La Caliente 92.1 & 95.7

Programming
- Format: Regional Mexican
- Subchannels: HD2: Spanish hot AC

Ownership
- Owner: Lotus Communications; (Arizona Lotus Corp.)
- Sister stations: KTKT, KFMA, KLPX, KMXZ-FM, KFFN

History
- First air date: February 20, 1983
- Former call signs: KFXX (1983–1991); KQSN (1991); KTZN (1991–1993); KEKO (1993–1995); KFMA (1995–2014)

Technical information
- Licensing authority: FCC
- Facility ID: 2746
- Class: C2
- ERP: 50,000 watts
- HAAT: 150 meters (490 ft)
- Transmitter coordinates: 32.290°N 111.019°W
- Translator: 95.7 K239CF (Tucson)

Links
- Public license information: Public file; LMS
- Webcast: Listen live
- Website: kcmt.com

KCMT (92.1 FM, "La Caliente 92.1 & 95.7") is a commercial radio station licensed to Green Valley, Arizona, United States, and serving the Tucson metropolitan area. It airs a regional Mexican format and is owned by Lotus Communications, with studios are on North Commerce Drive in Tucson. KCMT is often the highest-rated Spanish-language radio station in the Nielsen ratings for Tucson.

KCMT's transmitter is sited off Pima Mine Ranch Road in Tucson. KCMT broadcasts in HD Radio: the HD2 digital subchannel carries a Spanish hot AC format as "Exito 93.3". It feeds a 200-watt FM translator at 93.3 MHz. The main signal is also heard on a 240-watt FM translator at 95.7 MHz.

== History ==
The station signed on the air on February 20, 1983. Its original call sign was KFXX. It was a Class A FM station, limited to 3,000 watts of power, on a short tower in Green Valley. It was barely audible in the city of Tucson. The station's class was later boosted to C2, allowing it to increase power to 50,000 watts. Its tower was relocated into the more lucrative Tucson radio market.

In 1993, the station was acquired by Lotus Communications for $1.26 million. It played alternative rock as KFMA.

Lotus already owned a Regional Mexican station on 102.1 MHz, KCMT. On March 21, 2014, Lotus switched the two stations. KCMT and its Regional Mexican format moved to 92.1 FM, while KFMA and its alternative rock sound moved to the 102.1 FM frequency.

== See also ==
- List of radio stations in Arizona
