= KHUD =

Radio station in Tucson, Arizona

Coordinates: 32°14′56.2″N 111°7′1.3″W

- Tucson, Arizona; United States
- Broadcast area: Tucson metropolitan area
- Frequency: 92.9 MHz (HD Radio)
- Branding: 92.9 The Bull

Programming
- Format: Country
- Subchannels: HD2: Latin pop/AC "Magic 107.1"
- Affiliations: Premiere Networks

Ownership
- Owner: iHeartMedia, Inc.; (iHM Licenses, LLC)
- Sister stations: KMMA; KNST; KOHT; KRQQ; KTZR; KXEW

History
- First air date: March 1970
- Former call signs: KWFM (1969–1980, 1980–1992); KWFM-FM (1980, 1992–2001); KOYT (2001–2003); KWMT-FM (2003–2011); KMIY (2011–2021)

Technical information
- Licensing authority: FCC
- Facility ID: 53594
- Class: C
- ERP: 93,000 watts
- HAAT: 621 meters (2,037 ft)
- Translator: HD2: 107.1 K296GT (Tucson)

Links
- Public license information: Public file; LMS
- Webcast: Listen live (via iHeartRadio); HD2: Listen live (via iHeartRadio)
- Website: thebulltucson.iheart.com; HD2: magictucson.iheart.com

KHUD (92.9 FM) is a commercial radio station licensed to Tucson, Arizona, United States. It is owned by iHeartMedia, Inc. and features a country music format. The studios and offices are located north of downtown Tucson along Oracle Road.

KHUD's transmitter site is in the Tucson Mountains, west of the city; the tower is on West Hidden Canyon Drive in Tucson Estates. KHUD broadcasts in HD Radio.

== History ==
=== Rock (1970–1983) ===
Alvin Korngold, owner of KEVT (690 AM), was granted the construction permit for a new FM station in Tucson on August 6, 1969. The station would broadcast on 92.9 MHz and was assigned the KWFM call sign in October. After it was built, it signed on the air in March 1970. It began broadcasting 24 hours a day on April 1.

KWFM had a progressive rock format in its early years, which over time shifted to a more mass-appeal album rock sound. It was an affiliate of the ABC FM Network.

=== Adult Contemporary (1983–1989) ===
In 1983, KWFM flipped to adult contemporary under the "Lite Rock" branding.

=== Oldies (1989–2001) ===
In 1989, KWFM began broadcasting an oldies format known as "Cool FM". The station played hits from the 1950s, 1960s and early 1970s. However during the 1990s, all of its 1950s titles were removed and the station began adding more 1970s songs.

=== Country (2001–2003) ===
In 2001, KWFM was acquired by Clear Channel Communications, the forerunner to today's iHeartMedia. On April 2, 2001, KWFM and its oldies music moved to the 97.1 frequency.

KIIM-FM was consistently Tucson's top rated station, airing a country music format. Clear Channel wanted a full-power FM station to compete with KIIM. A new country station, KOYT "92.9 Coyote Country", was launched on 92.9.

=== Adult alternative (2003–2011) ===
KOYT flipped to adult album alternative (AAA) on December 5, 2003. Its call letters were switched to KWMT-FM on January 22, 2004. "The Mountain", as the station was known, focused on music from the AAA charts. Several rock artists recorded live performances to play on the station.

The Mountain had a segment known as The Chill Side of The Mountain every night from 11pm-1am. It included ambient and underground music such as AIR, Hooverphonic, Lamb, The Polyphonic Spree, Radiohead, Massive Attack, Morcheeba and Zero7. Acoustic Sunrise and Acoustic Sunset, from 7am-noon and 8-11pm respectively, offered a "unique blend of acoustic sounds", with a wide range of artists. A few times a month, the station held a small listener attended artist session and meet-and-greet called Studio C.

=== Hot adult contemporary (2011–2021) ===
In the late 2000s, KOYT began adding non-AAA artists, but it kept "The Mountain" branding. It was also added to the Mediabase and BDS "Hot AC" panels.

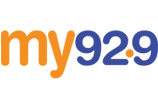
KMIY logo as "My 92.9"

On November 18, 2011, at 5pm, after playing "It's the End of the World as We Know It (And I Feel Fine)" by R.E.M., the station was relaunched. The format was hot adult contemporary, calling itself "My 92.9". The first song heard on My 92.9 was "Moves like Jagger" by Maroon 5 featuring Christina Aguilera. On November 28, 2011, KWMT-FM changed its call letters to KMIY, to match the "My 92.9" moniker.

In July 2013, the wake-up show from KBIG in Los Angeles, Valentine in the Morning, was replaced with a syndicated show from Detroit, Mojo In The Morning, which formerly aired on sister station KOHT. Mojo was later replaced by a local morning show, Cyndi & Chris, on November 2, 2015. KMIY modified its music mix in December 2017 to incorporate more 1980s and 1990s hits into its playlist, repositioning as "Variety from the 80s, 90s, and Today."

=== Country (2021–present) ===
Several weeks before Christmas Day 2020, KMIY switched to an all-Christmas music format. On January 4, 2021, at 9:29 a.m., after playing holiday songs until January 4, the station began stunting. It began airing songs containing the word "America" in the title until January 5, TV theme songs until January 6, and then a loop of "Baby Shark".

On the afternoon of January 6, KMIY flipped back to country music as "92.9 The Bull", launching with 10,000 songs in a row. The first song on "The Bull" was "My Kinda Party" by Jason Aldean.

The change was part of a format swap with sister station KYWD (97.1 FM). The call letters were changed to KHUD on March 29, 2021, with the KMIY call sign moving to the 97.1 frequency.

== KHUD-HD2 ==
=== iHeart80s ===
KHUD's HD2 digital subchannel originally served as the originating station of the iHeart80s channel on iHeartRadio. As of August 13, 2021, the iHeart80s music service has moved to Syracuse, New York, on co-owned WYYY's HD2 slot.

=== Magic 107.1 ===
On June 21, 2024, KHUD launched a bilingual adult contemporary format on its HD2 subchannel, branded as "Magic 107.1" (simulcast on translator K296GT 107.1 FM Tucson).

== See also ==
- List of radio stations in Arizona
