= Rich Herrera =

American sports announcer

- Born: Rich Herrera
- Education: California State University, Bakersfield
- Occupations: Sports radio personality, sports announcer
- Years active: 1990s–present
- Known for: First nationally syndicated Hispanic sports radio host in U.S.; host for MLB and NFL broadcasts
- Notable work: Host for Tampa Bay Rays, Fox Sports Radio, Sports USA Radio

Rich Herrera is an American sports announcer. Herrera is the only radio announcer in MLB or the NFL of Mexican–American Heritage without a playing background. He was the first nationally syndicated Hispanic sports radio personality in the United States working first at Sports Fan Radio, and later at Fox Sports Radio.

== Early life ==
Herrera attended California State University-Bakersfield where he was a member of Sigma Pi fraternity.

== Career ==
Rich previously worked with the Oakland As as their post-game show host from 1998 to 2000 and spent two years (1996–97) hosting the post-game talk shows for the San Francisco Giants and the NBA's Golden State Warriors on KNBR.

He was one of the original hosts of Fox Sports Radio when the network launched in 2000.

Herrera served as the host during pre- and post-game shows for the Tampa Bay Rays Baseball Radio Network from 2005 to 2011. Herrera was the featured play-by-play announcer on raysbaseball.com for the team's spring training games and filled in during the regular season. He served as the Rays Director of Radio Operations, running the team's statewide radio network. He joined Tampa Bay after working at Fox Sports, where he was a national talk show host for Fox Sports Arizona.

His national radio experience included radio shows for SportsFan Radio (LA/Las Vegas/NY) Prime Sports Radio (Dallas) and Fox Sports Radio. Herrera partnered with former NFL All Pro and Notre Dame All American Bob Golic for national radio shows.

As of 2011 Herrera was a member of the Sports USA Radio Football crew. He began working as a sideline reporter for their nationally syndicated NFL and NCAA broadcasts in 2003.

His baseball play-by-play experience included The Tucson Sidewinders of the PCL, The Durham Bulls of the International League, the Arizona Fall League games as well as the Rays. Herrera also hosted the weekly radio show "This Week in Rays Baseball", heard each Saturday during the season on the teams flagship station 620 WDAE in Tampa.

Herrera was a columnist for the San Francisco Examiner.

Since August 2012, Rich has worked as a sports talk show host with "98.7 The Fan", WHFS-FM. He hosts the evening program, "Out of Bounds" from 7PM-10PM Eastern.

In October 2020, Rich returned to KCUB (AM) in Tucson, Arizona to serve as programming director and local afternoon-drive host. He generated controversy in May 2026, during a radio discussion about the involvement of Democratic Congressman Hakeem Jeffries of New York in Virginia politics. He said that Jeffries, who is Black, should "keep his cotton picking hands off of (sic) Virginia politics".

== Volunteer ==
Herrera's charity work includes The Children's Dream Fund and Make a Wish Foundation. He serves on the board of directors of the Heart Gallery.
