= KXEW =

Spanish-language radio station in South Tucson, Arizona

- South Tucson, Arizona; United States
- Broadcast area: Tucson metropolitan area
- Frequency: 1600 kHz
- Branding: Radio Tejano

Programming
- Format: Tejano music

Ownership
- Owner: iHeartMedia, Inc.; (iHM Licenses, LLC)
- Sister stations: KHUD, KMMA, KNST, KOHT, KRQQ, KTZR

History
- First air date: May 10, 1963
- Call sign meaning: Tribute to Mexico City's XEW

Technical information
- Licensing authority: FCC
- Facility ID: 8144
- Class: B
- Power: 1,000 watts
- Transmitter coordinates: 32°11′46″N 110°59′2″W

Links
- Public license information: Public file; LMS
- Webcast: Listen live (via iHeartRadio)
- Website: tejano1600.iheart.com

KXEW (1600 AM) is a commercial radio station licensed to South Tucson, Arizona, United States, and broadcasting to the Tucson metropolitan area. KXEW airs a Tejano music format known as "Radio Tejano 1600" and is owned by iHeartMedia, Inc. Its studios are located north of downtown Tucson along North Oracle Road.

KXEW's transmitter is on West El Puente Lane near South Santa Cruz Lane in Tucson.

== History ==
KXEW signed on the air on May 10, 1963. It was a daytimer station, required to go off the air at night. The call sign was inspired by Mexico City's most powerful radio station, XEW. KXEW was owned and operated by Pan American Radio Corporation; J. Carlos McCormick was its president, CEO and majority shareholder.

The Spanish-language format featured traditional Mexican and Latin American music, with hourly newscasts as well as sports and social commentary segments throughout the day. The style of programming was an adaptation of "Color Radio" that had been borrowed from its innovator, former Tucson disc jockey, Chuck Blore. Oscar Humberto Stevens, Sr. was the first station manager, and Lorenzo Palma Cárdenas was the first program director. The directional antenna array was designed by and the station's studio, transmitter and phaser equipment installed by Oscar Leon Cuellar, who later became Arizona's first registered professional engineer with a broadcasting and communication specialization.

The station was nicknamed "Radio Fiesta." During its first years of operation, some of the radio personalities who served on its staff were Alfonso Gárfias, Chato López Quintana, Tony Castro Miranda, Arnulfo "Fito" Palma Cárdenas, Ernesto Portillo Villalobos, Enrique Villegas Grácia and Manuel Palma Parra. Oscar Stevens, Carlos McCormick, Ernesto Portillo, Lorenzo Palma, Tony Castro and Enrique Villegas had formerly worked at KEVT, Tucson's first all Spanish-language station. KXEW was the first Arizona commercial radio station license granted to a corporation/person controlled and managed by an applicant of Mexican ancestry. KXEW was sold in 1968 to a group headed by the entertainer Harry Belafonte, making it a rare Arizona station that was owned by a company headed by an African-American. It continued under the management of Ernesto Portillo.

In September 2000, KXEW was acquired by Clear Channel Communications. In 2014, the company changed its name to iHeartMedia, Inc.
