= KLPX =

Classic rock radio station in Tucson, Arizona

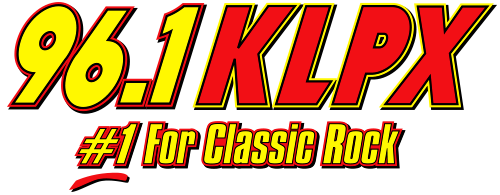
- Tucson, Arizona; United States
- Broadcast area: Tucson, Arizona
- Frequency: 96.1 MHz (HD Radio)
- Branding: 96.1 KLPX

Programming
- Format: Classic rock
- Subchannels: HD3: 93.3 Hank FM (Classic country); HD4: KCEE simulcast (Christian radio)
- Affiliations: United Stations Radio Networks

Ownership
- Owner: Lotus Communications; (Arizona Lotus Corp.)
- Sister stations: KTKT, KFMA, KCMT, KMXZ-FM, KFFN

History
- First air date: August 16, 1967 (as KCEE-FM)
- Former call signs: KCEE-FM (1967–1979); KTKT-FM (1979–1981)

Technical information
- Licensing authority: FCC
- Facility ID: 2745
- Class: C
- ERP: 82,000 watts
- HAAT: 595 meters (1,952 ft)
- Transmitter coordinates: 32°14′56″N 111°6′59″W
- Translators: HD3: 93.3 K227DX (Tucson); HD4: 106.7 K294CR (Tucson)

Links
- Public license information: Public file; LMS
- Webcast: Listen live HD3: Listen live
- Website: klpx.com crankthehanktucson.com (HD3)

KLPX (96.1 FM) is a commercial radio station in Tucson, Arizona. It is owned by Lotus Communications and airs a classic rock radio format. Local DJs are heard during the day and the syndicated "Nights with Alice Cooper" show is heard evenings. The station uses the slogan "#1 for Classic Rock". KLPX's studios and offices are on North Commerce Drive. Its transmitter is located on Tower Peak in the Tucson Mountains near Saguaro National Park.

== History ==
KCEE-FM first signed on the air on August 16, 1967. It was owned by Strauss Broadcasting Company, which had acquired the construction permit from Associated Broadcasters of Tucson, Inc., before it went on the air, and was a sister station to KCEE (790 AM, now KNST). At first, it simulcast its AM counterpart, but later programmed a beautiful music format.

On July 4, 1979, Lotus bought KCEE-FM and changed its call sign to KTKT-FM, as a companion to KTKT (990 AM). On February 26, 1981, KTKT-FM became KLPX. That was coupled with a change to album-oriented rock. KWFM (92.9 FM, now KHUD) had been Tucson's only rock outlet but with KLPX's switch, there were now two rock stations in the market. By the late 1980s, KWFM gave up rock for adult contemporary music; this made KLPX the only rocker in the Tucson radio market for some time.

In the early 2000s, KLPX had begun scaling back on newer rock songs, and made the complete transition to classic rock a few years later.

== HD Radio ==
On April 28, 2025, KLPX's HD3 subchannel changed their format to classic country, branded as "93.3 Hank FM" (simulcast on translator K227DX 93.3 FM Tucson).

On December 15, 2025 KLPX announced over the air that their HD2 subchannel "Deep Cuts" was being discontinued, effective that same day. No replacement programming was announced.
