= CFNV =

Radio station in Montreal, Quebec, Canada

- Montreal, Quebec; Canada
- Broadcast area: Greater Montreal
- Frequency: 940 kHz
- Branding: AM 940 La Superstation

Programming
- Language: French
- Format: Expected to be French health and wellness format; currently (broadcasting) classic French music, talk, news/weather, and sports)

Ownership
- Owner: RRR Media; (7954689 Canada Inc.)
- Sister stations: CFQR

History
- First air date: 2017

Technical information
- Class: A
- Power: 50,000 watts
- Transmitter coordinates: 45°23′34.08″N 73°41′53.16″W

Links
- Website: am940.ca

CFNV (940 kHz) is a French language AM radio station in Montreal, Quebec, Canada. It is owned by RRR Media 7954689 CANADA and was licensed in 2011. CRTC records indicated that the station was not operating for most of the license term. CFNV began test broadcasting in 2016, with a full-time power of 50,000 watts as a clear channel (class A) station, and a Francophone talk radio format. Broadcasts started in 2017 with mainly music, rather than talk, using the branding AM 940 La Superstation.

In July 2018, it was announced that CFNV would offer a French health and wellness program format once the extended testing of the technical facilities was completed. The CRTC gave CFNV a short-term license renewal on August 21, 2018, to August 31, 2023.

== History ==
CINW, owned and operated by Corus Quebec as a clear channel Class A station, ceased operations at 7:00 p.m. ET on January 29, 2010. At that time, CINW and its French-language sister station, CINF 690 AM, abruptly left the air and subsequently went dark.

For most of its history, CINW had broadcast an English-language all-news format, while CINF had aired all news in French. But in their later years, due to the expense of staffing and running all news around the clock, both stations had adjusted their formats. CINW began airing talk shows along with news, then switched to an oldies music format in its final months.

== Reactivation ==
Six years later, in 2016, the 940 AM frequency resurfaced when a new station, under the call sign CFNV, launched with plans for a Francophone news/talk format.

== Licensing ==
With the closure of Montreal station CINW, on July 29, 2011, the CRTC began taking other applications for the vacant 940 frequency. On September 7, 2011, the CRTC announced the applicants for the 940 frequency; competing against earlier owner Cogeco was Paul Tietolman, the son of broadcaster Jack Tietolman, who planned to use 940 for an anglophone news-talk formatted station.

On November 21, 2011, Tietolman was awarded the frequency, but this was Francophone news-talk instead, a format that he had originally applied for on 690. A year later, he and his two partners were granted a licence for English talk to be broadcast on 600 kHz in the spring of 2013. However, by that point, none of the stations that the TTP group applied for had signed on.

On September 19, 2014, the CRTC gave the TTP group another year to commence broadcasting on 940 in French and 600 in English. This extension was the second and, originally, final one allowed for 940, giving the station until November 21, 2015 to commence broadcasting or face cancellation of its licence, however, it was renewed for an additional year on October 30, 2015, with November 21, 2016 now set as the cut-off date.

On October 26, 2016, a test tone began on AM 940. The callsign was also announced on that date as CFNV. The station officially began on-air testing on November 16, 2016 with music and a recorded announcement promoting the launch of the new station with a phone number to report signal interference.

== Ownership ==
The radio station is owned by a numbered company, 7954689 Canada Inc. operating in Montreal, Quebec, Canada. It is equally controlled by:

- 7954689 CANADA INC (RRR MEDIA) PHIL RICHARDS

The group is collectively known as TTP Media now (RRR MEDIA ), which reflects the names of the previous three owners, Tietolman, Tétrault and Pancholy.
