= Frank Brinsley =

Radio "shock jock" (born 1971)

Frank Brinsley (b. May 1971 in Washington, DC) is a self-proclaimed small market “shock jock”.

As the son of a preacher, his family moved a lot for his father’s work. Brinsley spent time in places like Colorado Springs, Cincinnati, and the small town of Ashland, Kentucky in northeastern Kentucky. The latter is where he spent most of his time growing up. Brinsley graduated from Boyd County high school in 1989.

Brinsley entered radio at age 15, on Christian AM station 1040 WOKT in Ashland. From there, he moved on to WWKU in Glasgow, Kentucky. The first top-50 station he worked for outside of Kentucky was in Memphis, for FM 100 Memphis. From there, he moved on to market number 19-Tampa. Shortly after, he went to New York City to work as a music director for Hot AC radio station Big 105, which is now Power 105.

After two years in New York, he got the offer to join up with former Memphis co-worker John Michael. In this new position, he travelled to Tucson to do mornings at alternative rock station KFMA. After two years of problems, Michael left in summer 2002, leaving Brinsley to do mornings with the other co-hosts. It became The Frank Show. Syndication later followed, to rock station KDOT, in Reno, Nevada. Ratings were good, and the show became popular among the target audience for alternative radio.

In 2003, he met his wife Allison, who worked for Clear Channel Communications. In November 2005, they married. They currently live in Marana.

== Awards ==
Brinsley has won awards in the Tucson Weekly's annual Best of Tucson awards for the best radio personality.
