= WCPC =

- Houston, Mississippi; United States
- Broadcast area: Tupelo area
- Frequency: 940 kHz
- Branding: Truth Radio 940; Truth Radio 105.7

Programming
- Format: Christian radio

Ownership
- Owner: Cajun Radio Corporation

Technical information
- Licensing authority: FCC
- Facility ID: 71291
- Class: B
- ERP: 31,000 watts day 7 watts night
- Transmitter coordinates: 33°55′43″N 89°0′36″W
- Translator: 105.7 W289CJ (Tupelo)

Links
- Public license information: Public file; LMS
- Webcast: WCPC 940 Listen Live; WCPC 105.7 Listen Live
- Website: WCPC 940 Online; WCPC 105.7 Online

WCPC (940 AM) is a radio station broadcasting a Christian radio format. Licensed to Houston, Mississippi, United States, the station serves the Tupelo area. The station is currently owned by Cajun Radio Corporation.

Among the locally produced programs on WCPC is "The Sacred Harp Hour", a half-hour Sunday morning broadcast of Sacred Harp singing. Since 1959, this program has featured recorded (occasionally live) singing, along with announcements of current and upcoming singings. A CD of some of these performances was issued in 2006.
