= XEX-AM =

Radio station in Mexico City

- Mexico City; Mexico
- Frequency: 730 kHz
- Branding: W Deportes

Programming
- Format: Sports

Ownership
- Owner: PRISA/Radiópolis; (Cadena Radiodifusora Mexicana, S.A. de C.V.)
- Sister stations: XEQ-AM, XEQ-FM, XEW-FM/AM, XEX-FM

History
- First air date: 1947

Technical information
- Licensing authority: CRT
- Class: A
- Power: 60 kW
- Transmitter coordinates: 19°21′54.18″N 98°57′27.73″W

Links
- Webcast: Listen live
- Website: wdeportes.com

XEX-AM (730 AM) is a commercial AM radio station based in Mexico City, Mexico. It carries a sports radio format known as "W Deportes." The station is owned by Radiópolis.

XEX is a Class A clear-channel station, powered at 60 kilowatts and using a non-directional antenna. The transmitter is on Avenida Rio Bravo, in Los Reyes Acaquilpan, just east of Mexico City.

== History ==
XEX-AM "TDW Radio" logo, used from 2012 to January 2017

XEX-AM came to air in 1947 as a 500,000 watt national radio station. The Mexican government built XEX with the transmitter equipment of the former XERA at Villa Acuña, Coahuila, whose 500 kW transmitter was seized, dismantled and shipped to Mexico City. It obtained its call sign from a Monterrey station, which was reassigned the XEAW-AM call letters.

During the 1940s, XEX was a network affiliate of the Mutual Broadcasting System as its Latin American flagship station. In 1951, it was sold to Rómulo O'Farrill after four years of losses. Its sister stations were also flagships of Latin American branches of competing radio networks, XEW-AM with NBC and XEQ-AM with CBS. XEX was also affiliated with ABC.

By 1970, XEX had reduced its half-million watt output to 150,000 watts.

After airing a multitude of formats throughout its existence, in 2003 it became a sports radio outlet. The sports format it inherited started in 1999 as "Super Deportiva" on 1180 AM. Later, it moved to 830 AM ("Estadio 830") and 590 AM ("Estadio 590"). In 2003, the format settled at XEX and was known as Estadio W until 2012 when it adopted the branding "TDW," in reference to Televisa's sports cable channel "TDN."

XEX moved its transmitter in 2016 to a new site in Los Reyes Acaquilpan, La Paz Municipality, State of Mexico. After broadcasting at 150,000 watts in the 1970s and 80s, and more recently at 100,000 watts, this transmitter relocation was coupled in a further reduction in power to 60,000 watts. The sports format continued through January 5, 2017, when the TDW Radio network bid farewell to its listeners. The station was relaunched the following Monday as "W Deportes."
