= Radio Waikato =

Coordinates: 37.7227°S 175.4607°E

Radio Waikato was a radio station in Hamilton on 954 kHz AM. The station was first started in 1971 as New Zealand's third privately owned station, the station originally broadcast on 930AM but moved to 954AM in 1978 after New Zealand's AM band frequency spacing was adjusted from 10 kHz to 9 kHz.

In 1986 Radio Waikato changed to a country music format and was renamed Country Gold - Waikato 954. In 1988 the station's frequency was sold to Radio Pacific and was then used to broadcast Radio Pacific into the Waikato region with originally local programming but later networked programming from Radio Pacific in Auckland.

== Other Radio Waikato ==
In 1993 a new station of the same name was started in Hamilton. This station had no connection to the original Radio Waikato and was broadcast on 576AM and 100.0FM. This station closed down in 1994 and the AM frequency was later used by Radio Liberty in the mid-1990s and the FM frequency was later used to broadcast Radio Hauraki between 1995 and 1997.
