= WKGM =

- Smithfield, Virginia; United States
- Broadcast area: Hampton Roads
- Frequency: 940 kHz
- Branding: Joy FM

Programming
- Format: Southern gospel

Ownership
- Owner: Baker Family Stations; (WKGM, Inc.)

History
- First air date: December 18, 1974
- Former call signs: WEOO (1974–1980)

Technical information
- Licensing authority: FCC
- Facility ID: 73160
- Class: B
- Power: 10,000 watts (day); 3,100 watts (night)
- Transmitter coordinates: 36°57′16″N 76°37′48″W (day); 37°5′51″N 76°40′16″W (night)
- Translator: See § Translator

Links
- Public license information: Public file; LMS
- Website: https://joyfm.org/listen-live

WKGM (940 AM) is a southern gospel formatted broadcast radio station licensed to Smithfield, Virginia, serving Hampton Roads. WKGM is owned and operated by Baker Family Stations.

== Translator ==
In addition to the main station, WKGM is relayed by an FM translator to widen its broadcast area.

Call sign	Frequency	City of license	FID	ERP (W)	HAAT	Class	FCC info
W289CI	105.7 FM	Smithfield, Virginia	81226	250 watts	121 m (397 ft)	D	LMS
