= KIIM-FM =

Radio station in Tucson, Arizona

Coordinates: 32.249°N 111.117°W

- Tucson, Arizona; United States
- Broadcast area: Tucson metropolitan area
- Frequency: 99.5 MHz
- Branding: KIIM 99.5

Programming
- Format: Country
- Affiliations: Westwood One

Ownership
- Owner: Cumulus Media; (Radio License Holding CBC, LLC)
- Sister stations: KCUB; KHYT; KSZR; KTUC

History
- First air date: March 1954
- Former call signs: KTKT-FM (1954-58); KFMM (1958-79); KNDE (1979-83)

Technical information
- Licensing authority: FCC
- Facility ID: 56052
- Class: C
- ERP: 90,000 watts
- HAAT: 621 m (2,037 ft)

Links
- Public license information: Public file; LMS
- Webcast: Listen live; Listen live; Listen live (via iHeartRadio)
- Website: www.kiimfm.com

KIIM-FM (99.5 MHz) is a commercial radio station in Tucson, Arizona. It is owned by Cumulus Media and airs a country music radio format. Studios and offices are located on Oracle Road in North Tucson.

KIIM-FM's effective radiated power (ERP) is 90,000 watts (93,000 with beam tilt). The transmitter is off West Hidden Canyon Drive in Tucson. The signal extends from Florence and Casa Grande to the Mexico-U.S. border.

== History ==
=== KTKT-FM and KFMM ===
The first FM station to sign on in Tucson was KTKT-FM 99.5, in March 1954. Thomas J. Wallace, owned the station, along with KTKT. KTKT-FM mostly simulcast the AM station's programming.

In 1958, KTKT-FM was slated to move to Mount Bigelow, the tallest peak near Tucson. That move did not materialize, but it did result in a call sign change to KFMM (FM on the Mountain). Those call letters were used for 21 years.

KTKT-FM/KFMM was sold several times in its early years: to Copper State Broadcasting Corporation in 1957 and to Lee Little in 1960. During this time, the station was powered at 30,000 watts, a third of its current power. The tower was only 73 feet (22 m) tall, keeping the station's signal only within Tucson and its close-in suburbs.

=== Religious KFMM and KNDE country ===
In 1965, KFMM was bought by the Tucson Broadcasting Company, which also owned KTUC. KFMM aired a Christian radio format.

In 1979, a new company calling itself KTUC, Incorporated, acquired KTUC and KFMM. It switched the FM station's call letters to KNDE, and became an automated country music station calling itself Candy Country.

=== Country KIIM ===
In 1983, after a sale, KNDE changed its call letters again, this time to KIIM, switching to a live country music format, and becoming the only country outlet on FM. There was one other country station, co-owned KCUB, which specialized in a more personality and information country format.

Rex Broadcasting received a construction permit from the Federal Communications Commission to boost power to 100,000 watts, coupled with a sizable increase in antenna height. KIIM proved so successful, Rex Broadcasting decided to switch its AM station to the same call letters. AM 1290 became KIIM, while FM 99.5 became KIIM-FM. Several years later, KIIM switched back to the KCUB call sign, as a classic country outlet.

In 2001, Citadel Broadcasting purchased both KIIM-FM and KCUB, switching the AM station to a sports radio format, but keeping the highly rated KIIM-FM as a country outlet. Citadel was acquired by current owner, Cumulus Media, in 2011.

== Awards ==
KIIM-FM DJ Buzz Jackson was a 2006 Academy of Country Music nominee for "Personality Of The Year." In 2007, KIIM-FM was nominated for "Radio Station Of The Year" by the Academy Of Country Music. In 2007, Jackson was nominated for "medium market personality of the year" by the Country Music Association. In 2010, Buzz Jackson won the "medium market personality of the year" award from the Academy Of Country Music.
