= XEQ-AM =

Radio station in Mexico City

Simulcast of XEQ-FM 92.9
- Mexico City; Mexico
- Frequency: 940 kHz
- Branding: La Ke Buena

Programming
- Language: Spanish
- Format: Grupera

Ownership
- Owner: Radiópolis; (Cadena Radiodifusora Mexicana, S.A. de C.V.)
- Sister stations: XEW-AM, XEW-FM, XEX-AM, XEX-FM, XEQ-FM

History
- First air date: 1938

Technical information
- Licensing authority: CRT
- Facility ID: 101828
- Class: B
- Power: 30,000 watts
- Transmitter coordinates: 19°21′38.4″N 98°59′33.7″W

Links
- Webcast: Listen live
- Website: kebuena.com.mx/

XEQ-AM (940 AM) is a commercial AM radio station in Mexico City. The concession is held by Cadena Radiodifusora Mexicana, S.A. de C.V. and is operated by Radiópolis. It airs a Spanish-language Grupera radio format known as "La Ke Buena."

XEQ is a Class B, clear-channel station, powered at 30,000 watts. The other Class A station on 940 AM is in Montreal, far enough away that XEQ does not need to use a directional antenna to avoid interference. XEQ's transmitter is at Los Reyes Acaquilpan, on Boulevard Generalísimo Morelos, east of Mexico City.

== History ==
XEQ began operations in 1938. It was owned by Emilio Azcárraga Vidaurreta doing business as Radio Panamericana, S.A., and was a network affiliate of CBS Radio as part of the "Chain of the Americas." It was Azcárraga's second station after XEW-AM. By the 1960s, XEQ was operating with 150,000 watts during the day and 50,000 at night. In the 1970s, it switched to 100,000 watts day and night. It later reduced its power to 50,000 watts.

The XEQ call sign later appeared on other stations: XEQ-FM was licensed in the 1950s, and the original XEQ-TV, broadcasting to Puebla, signed on in 1952 to relay XEW-TV. (In 1985, a call sign swap led to a different XEQ-TV in Mexico City.)

In 2014 and 2015, XEQ was approved to lower its power from 50,000 to 30,000 watts.

Until 2019, the station was known as Ke Buena but carried a tropical version of the format, instead of the typical grupera version. On October 31, 2019, this ended and XEQ-AM began simulcasting XEQ-FM. On August 18, 2023, the simulcast ended and XEQ-AM was relaunched as "La Q" with a Spanish-language adult hits format, mostly consisting of tropical, regional Mexican, grupera and romantic music from the 1970s to the 2000s.

On October 12, 2026, the station jettisoned the "La Q" format and became a near-total simulcast of XEQ-FM again, breaking away to air independent programming on weekdays between 9:00 and 14:00.
