= XEQ-FM =

Radio station in Mexico City

Simulcast of XEQ-AM 940
- Mexico City; Mexico
- Broadcast area: Greater Mexico City
- Frequency: 92.9 MHz
- Branding: La Ke Buena

Programming
- Format: Grupera

Ownership
- Owner: Radiópolis; (Cadena Radiodifusora Mexicana, S.A. de C.V.)
- Sister stations: XEX-AM, XEQ-AM, XEW-FM/AM, XEX-FM

History
- First air date: April 16, 1957

Technical information
- Licensing authority: CRT
- Class: C1
- ERP: 79.07 kW
- HAAT: 127.07 meters (416.9 ft)
- Transmitter coordinates: 19.3945°N 99.1744°W

Links
- Webcast: Listen live
- Website: kebuena.com.mx

XEQ-FM is a radio station in Mexico City. Broadcasting on 92.9 FM, XEQ-FM broadcasts grupera music under the name "La Ke Buena" and is the flagship of a network of stations with the same branding and format. The original concession was awarded on April 16, 1957 to Radio Mexicana del Centro, S.A. de C.V. The transmitter is located atop World Trade Center Mexico City building.

In 1978, XEQ-FM became the first tropical music station in Mexico City under the name "Tropi Q"; others later followed. The format moved to AM in 1993, when XEQ-FM picked up its current name and format of grupera music. The grupera format had previously been on XEX-AM, where it was known as "La Super X".

From October 31, 2019 to August 18, 2023, the station was simulcasted on XEQ-AM.
