= KTUC =

Radio station in Tucson, Arizona

- Tucson, Arizona; United States
- Broadcast area: Tucson metropolitan area
- Frequency: 1400 kHz
- Branding: Freedom 1400

Programming
- Format: Conservative talk radio
- Affiliations: ABC News Radio; Fox News Talk; Westwood One

Ownership
- Owner: Cumulus Media; (Radio License Holding CBC, LLC)
- Sister stations: KCUB; KHYT; KIIM-FM; KSZR

History
- First air date: July 10, 1926
- Former call signs: KGAR (1926–1941)
- Call sign meaning: Tucson

Technical information
- Licensing authority: FCC
- Facility ID: 35684
- Class: C
- Power: 1,000 watts
- Transmitter coordinates: 32°16′37″N 110°58′53″W

Links
- Public license information: Public file; LMS
- Webcast: Listen live; Listen live; Listen live (via iHeartRadio)
- Website: www.freedom1400.com

KTUC (1400 AM) is a commercial radio station licensed to Tucson, Arizona, United States. It is owned by Cumulus Media and airs a conservative talk radio format, known as "Freedom 1400". KTUC's studios and transmitter are on Nixon Low Way, off Roger Road.

== History ==
=== Early years ===
KTUC is the oldest station in Tucson, signing on the air on July 10, 1926. Originally it broadcast on 1370 kHz, using the call sign KGAR. It was owned by Tucson Motor Services, with studios on South 6th Avenue. KGAR was an affiliate of the CBS Radio Network, carrying its schedule of dramas, comedies, news, sports, soap operas, game shows and big band broadcasts during the "Golden Age of Radio".

In 1941, the North American Regional Broadcasting Agreement (NARBA) switched the station's frequency to AM 1400, broadcasting at 250 watts. The call letters were changed to the current KTUC. It continued as a CBS news affiliate for more than half a century, even after network programming moved from radio to TV in the 1950s. At that time, KTUC switched to a full service, middle of the road format of popular music, news and sports.

=== News and talk ===
In the early 1970s KTUC used the slogan "Formula 1400", which referred to its practice of airing 35 minutes of news programming and 25 minutes of music programming to round out the hour. The hour started with the news programming then went to the music programming.

In the late 1970s, the station segued to a news/talk format, airing news all day and syndicated talk shows at night. It was an affiliate of the Arizona Broadcasting System and picked up newscasts from KTAR in Phoenix on a phone line. By 1977, it was airing a 20-minute newsreel format, with CBS, ABC and Mutual radio newscasts all heard each hour on 20 minute intervals. ABC and Mutual were both tape-delayed. Larry King's Mutual talk show aired overnight, although those broadcasts were replaced by the short-lived Enterprise Radio Network in 1981.

Tucson Toros baseball games were carried live, although the studio recreated road games in 1980.

KTUC was named the AP Broadcast News Station of The Year in 1980. That year, its news staff broke the story about chemical contamination in the underground aquifers of southern Tucson, news items that prompted a major political controversy and subsequent cleanup. It also won investigative awards for breaking and following up on the story of a factory that painted glow-in-the-dark watch dials and instrument panels using tritium, a radioactive isotope that was found in school lunches prepared in a commissary across the street.

Throughout the entire period from the 1970s until the Arizona Diamondbacks came into existence, KTUC was the Tucson affiliate of the Los Angeles Dodgers radio network syndicated from KABC radio in Los Angeles. The station also carried California Angels broadcasts picked up from KMPC in Los Angeles, and would tape delay the Angels games, or air them on sister station KFMM, when the Dodgers were on the air. In the days before cable television, when baseball games could be only be seen once a week on Major League Baseball on NBC, the Dodgers and Angels radio broadcasts developed a popular following in Tucson. 1970s sports director Rory Markas went to the 2002 World Series to cover the Angels for KTUC. General manager Tom Maples vowed he could sell ads for a play-by-play of two kids playing basketball with peach basket hoops. KTUC, while under Maples's leadership, aired live play-by-play of high school football and basketball games for many years sponsored by the KTUC Sports Boosters, mostly made up of small businesses throughout Tucson.

In the late 1980s, the station was the Tucson affiliate of the Arizona Sun Devils radio network. In the 1990s, the station reversed affiliations and became the flagship of the Arizona Wildcats. KTUC also was the Tucson affiliate of the Phoenix Suns radio network.

=== Switch from talk to standards ===
On January 21, 1998, Sloane Broadcasting bought KTUC and sister station KOAZ for $6.5 million. Sloane switched KTUC's format from talk to adult standards.

In 2001, KTUC was acquired by Citadel Broadcasting, a forerunner to today's Cumulus Media. Citadel and Cumulus continued the adult standards format, aimed at older listeners and retirees who have settled in the Tucson metropolitan area.

=== Switch from standards to conservative talk ===
On August 21, 2023, KTUC changed its format from adult standards to conservative talk, branded as "Freedom 1400". Vice President Ken Kowalcek said in a statement, "Freedom 1400 will be the ultimate destination for engaging discussions, insightful analysis, and a platform for diverse perspectives."

== Programming ==
KTUC airs nationally syndicated conservative talk shows, many from co-owned Westwood One and from Fox News Talk. KTUC also carries play-by-play of University of Arizona women's basketball games.
