= XEX-FM =

Los 40 station in Mexico City

- Mexico City; Mexico
- Broadcast area: Greater Mexico City
- Frequency: 101.7 MHz
- Branding: Los 40

Programming
- Format: Contemporary hit radio

Ownership
- Owner: Radiópolis; (Cadena Radiodifusora Mexicana, S.A. de C.V.)
- Sister stations: XEX; XEQ; XEQ-FM; XEW; XEW-FM

History
- First air date: October 1, 1975

Technical information
- Licensing authority: CRT
- Class: C1
- ERP: 51,190 watts
- HAAT: 127.07 m (416.9 ft)
- Transmitter coordinates: 19°23′40″N 99°10′26″W

Links
- Webcast: Listen live
- Website: los40.com.mx

XEX-FM (101.7 FM) is a commercial radio station in Mexico City, Mexico. Broadcasting from a tower atop the World Trade Center Mexico City, XEX-FM airs a Contemporary hit radio format and is the flagship station of the Mexican Los 40 network. Most songs in the playlist are hits in Spanish and English.

XEX-FM is a Class C1 station. It has an effective radiated power (ERP) of 51,190 watts.

== History ==
XEX-FM signed on the air on October 1, 1975. It became the third FM station in the Radiópolis/Televisa Radio system. It carried an adult contemporary music sound as "Stereo 102", but most of its history has been marked by frequent format changes. In the early 1980s, it was "Radio Romántica", then "Estelar FM" (both with romantic music). That was followed in 1988, by a return to pop music in English and Spanish as "Estéreo 102".

It later was "Yo 102", a contemporary hit radio format giving the station some ratings success. In 1994, it experimented with the name "Kiss FM", which failed to catch on. In 1996, after the brief return of Stereo 102, XEX-FM became "Vox FM".

In 2002, Televisa Radio and Spain's PRISA began a partnership. The two companies launched the "Los 40 Principales" brand in Mexico, which was popular in Spain and other Latin American countries. Televisa Radio and Grupo Radiorama signed an agreement, allowing the much larger Radiorama to syndicate the Los 40 Principales format to its stations for wider coverage across Mexico.
