= WADV =

- Lebanon, Pennsylvania; United States
- Broadcast area: Lebanon
- Frequency: 940 kHz

Programming
- Format: Christian, Southern gospel

Ownership
- Owner: Estate of Earl Kochel, Jr.; (Wadv Radio, Inc)

History
- First air date: July 4, 1976

Technical information
- Licensing authority: FCC
- Facility ID: 20401
- Class: D
- Power: 1,000 watts day 5 watts night
- Transmitter coordinates: 40°22′22.00″N 76°21′53.00″W

Links
- Public license information: Public file; LMS

WADV (940 AM) is a radio station licensed to Lebanon, Pennsylvania, United States. The station is currently owned by the Kochel family under holding company Wadv Radio, Inc. It went silent on December 5, 2019 due to problems with the transmitter. After notifying the FCC in February 2020 of the shutdown (citing a transmitter failure), the Kochels ceased responding to inquiries about the station. As of January 2021, WADV resumed broadcasting after replacing their transmitter.
