= Numbered company =

Company with a numeric placeholder name

A numbered company is a corporation given a generic name based on its sequentially assigned registration number. For instance, an entity incorporated under the Canada Business Corporations Act and assigned the corporation number 1234567 would be entitled to register "1234567 Canada Inc." as its legal name. Similarly, in Australia, a company assigned the Australian Company Number 123 456 789 upon registration can have its legal name as "123 456 789 Pty Ltd".

Numbered companies may include, but are by no means limited to, new companies that have not yet determined a permanent brand identity, or shell companies used by much larger enterprises for various purposes.

In some cases, a legitimately-active enterprise may be structured as a numbered company with a doing business as registration to provide the numbered entity with a name. A common reason for this is a franchise, where the franchisee is a numbered company, doing business under the franchised identity. This may also be done for the convenience of lawyers, who create a shelf corporation or advent corporation and then assign the recognisable identity later.

Although there is no similar tradition of numbered companies in the United States, there is also nothing preventing a company there from adopting a number – even one different from its registration number – as the main part of its name. When two Canadian broadcasters jointly acquired U.S. radio station WLYK in 2023, they did so using a company named "1234567 Corporation", which was established under Delaware law with file number 7202907.
