= Tortolita, Arizona =

- former CDP
- Location in Pima County and the state of Arizona
- Coordinates: 32°24′16″N 111°2′56″W
- Country: United States
- State: Arizona
- County: Pima

Area
  - Total: 11.9 sq mi (30.8 km^{2})
  - Land: 11.9 sq mi (30.7 km^{2})
  - Water: 0.039 sq mi (0.1 km^{2})
- Elevation: 2,690 ft (820 m)

Population (2000)
  - Total: 3,740
  - Density: 314/sq mi (121.4/km^{2})
- Time zone: UTC-7 (MST (no DST))
- FIPS code: 04-74975
- GNIS feature ID: 1777314

Tortolita was a census-designated place (CDP) in Pima County, Arizona, United States. The population was 3,740 at the 2000 census. Tortolita was situated between the growing incorporated towns of Oro Valley and Marana with most of the area previously part of the CDP having been annexed by the two towns during the 2000s. The remaining parts of the CDP that have not been annexed continue to be unincorporated portions of Pima County.

In 1997, the residents of Tortolita voted to incorporate as the Town of Tortolita. However, the 1997 law passed by the Arizona legislature that allowed cities and towns within six miles of other incorporated areas to incorporate without those neighboring cities' consent was overturned on constitutional grounds, and the incorporation was deemed invalid.

== Geography ==
Tortolita was located at 32°24′16″N 111°2′56″W (32.404322, -111.049006). According to the 2000 census taken by the United States Census Bureau, the CDP had a total area of 11.9 square miles (31 km^{2}), of which 11.9 square miles (31 km^{2}) was land and 0.04 square miles (0.10 km^{2}) (0.34%) was water.

== Census tracts ==
Tortolita was divided by Census tract. There were four census tracts which were designated as 46.31, 46.32, 46.33 and 46.34. The census-designated place for these tracts has changed and as of the 2010 Census, they are now part of the CDP known as Casas Adobes

== Demographics ==
As of the census of 2000, there were 3,740 people, 1,332 households, and 1,057 families residing in the CDP. The population density was 314.9 inhabitants per square mile (121.6/km^{2}). There were 1,408 housing units at an average density of 118.6 per square mile (45.8/km^{2}). The racial makeup of the CDP was 92.5% White, 0.8% Black or African American, 0.8% Native American, 0.8% Asian, 2.7% from other races, and 2.5% from two or more races. 12.3% of the population were Hispanic or Latino of any race.

There were 1,332 households, out of which 38.4% had children under the age of 18 living with them, 68.2% were married couples living together, 8.0% had a female householder with no husband present, and 20.6% were non-families. 15.4% of all households were made up of individuals, and 4.0% had someone living alone who was 65 years of age or older. The average household size was 2.81 and the average family size was 3.15.

In the CDP, the population was spread out, with 27.6% under the age of 18, 6.9% from 18 to 24, 27.6% from 25 to 44, 29.7% from 45 to 64, and 8.3% who were 65 years of age or older. The median age was 39 years. For every 100 females, there were 99.7 males. For every 100 females age 18 and over, there were 95.9 males.

The median income for a household in the CDP was $57,136, and the median income for a family was $64,573. Males had a median income of $44,886 versus $24,271 for females. The per capita income for the CDP was $25,550. About 5.7% of families and 5.2% of the population were below the poverty line, including 5.0% of those under age 18 and 7.8% of those age 65 or over.
