= KFMA =

Radio station in Oro Valley–Tucson, Arizona

Coordinates: 32.003°N 110.798°W

- Oro Valley, Arizona; United States
- Broadcast area: Tucson metropolitan area
- Frequency: 102.1 MHz
- Branding: Rock 102.1 KFMA

Programming
- Format: Active rock
- Affiliations: Compass Media Networks; United Stations Radio Networks

Ownership
- Owner: Lotus Communications; (Arizona Lotus Corp.)
- Sister stations: KCMT, KFFN, KLPX, KMXZ-FM, KTKT

History
- First air date: 1982; 44 years ago
- Former call signs: KCMT (2000–2014)
- Former frequencies: 101.9 MHz (2001–2002)
- Call sign meaning: FM (Frequency Modulation) Arizona (or Alternative Rock)

Technical information
- Licensing authority: FCC
- Facility ID: 87841
- Class: C1
- ERP: 100,000 watts
- HAAT: 81 meters (266 ft)

Links
- Public license information: Public file; LMS
- Webcast: Listen live
- Website: kfma.com

KFMA (102.1 MHz) is a commercial FM radio station licensed to Oro Valley, Arizona, and broadcasting to the Tucson metropolitan area. KFMA airs an active rock format and is owned by Lotus Communications. The studios and offices on North Commerce Drive.

KFMA has an effective radiated power (ERP) of 100,000 watts, the maximum for most FM stations. The transmitter is on West Zinnia Road in Tucson, near North Kalin Avenue.

== History ==
=== Easy listening (1982-198?) ===
In 1982 the station began using the call sign KEZG. It aired an easy listening and beautiful music format with quarter hour sweeps of instrumental cover versions of popular songs and soft vocals.

=== Top 40 (198?-1991) ===
After changing hands in the mid-1980s it became KFXX, a Top 40 station. In the early 1990s, the station was sold to Bill Yde, who eventually sold it Lotus Radio, its current owner.

=== Rock (1991–1993) ===
Between October 15, 1991 and September 21, 1993, it was KTZN, which played a Rock and Adult Contemporary mix.

=== Adult alternative (1993–1995) ===
KTZN then became 92.1 and 101.3 The Echo with the callsign KEKO. As the Echo, it was an adult album alternative station. The station broadcast on 92.1 MHz with a repeater on 101.3. The signal was sometimes hard to pick in all areas of the Tucson Metro Area due to distance, and the fact that the 92.1 frequency had an ERP of 50,000 watts. To overcome this, it had FM translator K267AF 101.3, located in Tucson. In many parts of Tucson, the translator was much easier to hear. Nevertheless, Lotus Communications coordinated a frequency swap with KCMT because the 92.1 frequency better served their target audience while the 102.1 frequency better served the target audience of KFMA.

=== Alternative (1995–2014) ===
In November 1995, the flip to KFMA and alternative rock was made. KFMA began streaming audio on the internet in 2003. Effective March 21, 2014, KFMA moved to 102.1 MHz.

=== Active rock (2014–present) ===
In 2014, the station shifted to an active rock playlist, using the name "Rock 102.1".

From 2017-19, the station aired the syndicated "Billy Madison Show" in morning drive time. Currently, Beef Vegan Presents is the morning show.

== Awards ==
- Tucson Weekly Best of Tucson: public-vote winner for its radio station category (usually Best Rock Station) every year since 1996 except once.

== Logos ==
KFMA Logo, circa 1998

Logo from circa 2002 until April 2004

Logo from April 2004 to March 2014
