= KMMA (FM) =

Spanish-language contemporary hit radio station in Tucson

- Green Valley, Arizona; United States
- Broadcast area: Tucson metropolitan area
- Frequency: 97.1 MHz (HD Radio)
- Branding: Mega 97.1

Programming
- Language: Spanish
- Format: Contemporary hit radio

Ownership
- Owner: iHeartMedia; (iHM Licenses, LLC)
- Sister stations: KHUD; KNST; KOHT; KRQQ; KTZR; KXEW

History
- First air date: October 21, 1990
- Former call signs: KGMS (1990–2001); KCEE (2001); KWFM-FM (2001–2003); KTZR-FM (2003–2011); KNST-FM (2011–2013); KYWD (2013–2021); KMIY (2021–2022)

Technical information
- Licensing authority: FCC
- Facility ID: 24583
- Class: C3
- ERP: 25,000 watts
- HAAT: 100 meters (330 ft)
- Transmitter coordinates: 32°00′11.8″N 110°47′51.1″W

Links
- Public license information: Public file; LMS
- Webcast: Listen live (via iHeartRadio)
- Website: megatucson.iheart.com

KMMA (97.1 MHz) is a commercial FM radio station licensed to Green Valley, Arizona and serving the Tucson metropolitan area. It carries a Spanish contemporary hit radio format and is owned by iHeartMedia. The studios are on North Oracle Road.

KMMA has an effective radiated power (ERP) of 25,000 watts. The transmitter is on Pima Mine Ranch Road, southeast of Tucson, near the Pima County Fairgrounds. Because of the transmitter location, the station is hard to pick up in most northern suburbs of Tucson, but is easy to receive in central and southern communities. KMMA broadcasts using HD Radio technology. Its HD2 digital subchannel formerly carries the iHeartRadio Love Songs format. The HD2 subchannel has since been turned off.

== History ==
=== Christian music (1990–2001) ===
The station signed on the air on October 21, 1990. The call sign was KGMS, which represented letters in the name of the owner, Good Music, Inc. KGMS was a Christian contemporary station that played Christian pop, rock, and even dance songs in the mix. Even though the station's transmitter was about 30 miles from Tucson, it was marketed to Tucson radio listeners.

=== Oldies (2001–2003) ===
In 2001, it became "Cool FM", an oldies station using the call sign KWFM-FM. KWFM originally was on 92.9, but when its owner, Clear Channel Communications switched it to country music as "Coyote Country", those call letters and format became available to 97.1. Problems with signal reception across the city were evident. Plans to move the station's license to Tucson and increase its power were never approved by the Federal Communications Commission, leaving poor ratings for Cool FM.

=== Spanish-language music (2003–2011) ===
In 2003, KWFM's call sign and oldies format were moved to 1450 AM, while 97.1 flipped to KTZR-FM, with a Spanish-language oldies format, "La Preciosa 97.1". It switched again, this time to Spanish AC as "Mia 97.1". Programming 97.1 to Tucson's Latino community did not improve the ratings. KTZR-FM was ranked anywhere from 15th to 20th place in Arbitron numbers.

=== KNST simulcast (2011–2013) ===
On November 28, 2011, KTZR-FM flipped to a simulcast of talk radio station KNST 790 AM. It changed its call letters to KNST-FM.

=== Country (2013–2021) ===
On February 14, 2013, KNST-FM flipped to country music as "Wild Country 97.1". A week later, the call sign changed to KYWD. On December 18, 2015, KYWD rebranded as "97.1 The Bull".

=== Hot adult contemporary (2021–2022) ===
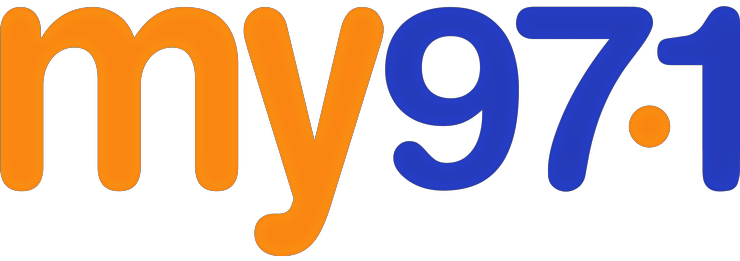
Logo as "My 97.1"

On January 6, 2021, at 9:29 am, KYWD's country format moved to KMIY (92.9 FM) as part of a format swap. KMIY's former hot adult contemporary format moved to 97.1, now branded as "My 97.1". The KMIY call sign moved to the 97.1 frequency on March 29.

=== Spanish contemporary (2022–present) ===
The station's call sign was changed to KMMA on September 16, 2022. On September 23, at 4:58 pm, after playing "Bad Habits" by Ed Sheeran, KMMA began stunting with a jockless Spanish CHR music playlist, with liners in both English and Spanish advising listeners to get ready for a new radio station and to be "a part of history". The first song under the stunt was "Soy Peor" by Bad Bunny.

While at the time of the shift the station had not disclosed any further information as to when the change would take place, radio news website RadioInsight had revealed iHeart's potential plans over two months earlier on July 13. iHeart management had registered several domains for the station, which suggested possibilities for the station such as a flip to sports talk as "Wildcat 97.1" or a resurrection of the "My" format's predecessor on 92.9 FM, adult album alternative as "The Mountain". The change came after the format proved unable to recover from the move to 97.1 in local Nielsen ratings, bottoming out with a 0.6 share in the August 2022 books.

On September 26, at 7:03 a.m., the station flipped to a bilingual-presented Spanish CHR format as "Mega 97.1, #1 Para Latino Hits". The first song played on Mega was "Provenza" by Karol G. With the move, the station added former KZZP Phoenix afternoon host Suzette Rodriguez in mornings from 6am-12pm and Ivan Gonzalez from 12-6pm. Rodriguez, a Tucson native, was previously heard on KRQQ and the syndicated JohnJay & Rich morning show, and had most recently tracked afternoons in the market on KOHT.

== See also ==
- List of radio stations in Arizona
