= Mojo in the Morning =

US radio program

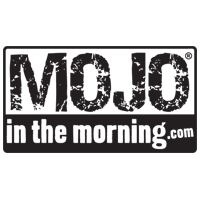
- Running time: 5:00 am–10:30 am
- Country of origin: United States
- Home station: WKQI
- Syndicates: iHeartMedia, Inc.
- Hosted by: Mojo
- Original release: February 21, 2000

Mojo in the Morning is a long-running American morning radio talk show that runs weekdays from 6am–11am, with a warm-up show running from 5am-6am Eastern Time. The show first launched on February 21, 2000, on Channel 955 in Detroit. It can also be heard on 104.5 WSNX-FM in Grand Rapids, Michigan and WVKS 92.5 KISS FM in Toledo, Ohio. It is also streamed on the iHeartRadio app via the streams of all three stations.

Mojo in the Morning is currently hosted by Mojo, Shannon, Kev and Anna. It is under contract to iHeartMedia through 2025. In 2020, the radio show earned the distinction of being the longest-running FM morning program in Michigan history. The show actively supports various charities and has launched two local charities: the "Breaking & Entering Christmas Wish" (where they show up on the recipient's doorstep with clothing, food, toys and Christmas trees) and "Time Team" (where they encourage listeners to donate their time for various community service projects). The show also donated proceeds from sales made for CDs of their "Phone Scam" segments. Since 2018, Mojo in the Morning has also published an on-demand daily podcast which has consistently ranked among the Top 100 most popular podcasts on the iHeartRadio network.

In 2023 and 2024 Mojo was the Most listened-to morning show podcast network in Michigan. 20 Million Mojo Network downloads in 2024 375K downloads per WEEK to the Mojo Podcast Network. 8 million total hours listened to the Mojo In The Morning's podcast in 2024. In 2025 Mojo was awarded with the honor of being inducted into the National Radio Hall Of Fame. https://www.radiohalloffame.com/2025-inductees

== Staff ==
=== Current ===
- Mojo (Host/Creator/Namesake, 2000–present)
- Shannon Murphy (co-host, 2009–present)
- "Kev" Kevin Irwin II (co-host, 2023–present)
- Lydia Jarjosa (Executive Producer, 2023–present)
- Mike Aguilar (Grand Rapids affiliate host, 2017–present)
- Bianca Kajy (Director of Social Impact, 2025–present)
- Zack Martin (Audio Producer, 2021–present)

=== Previous ===
- Sara Fouracre (co-host, 2000–2007)
- Chad Mitchell (executive producer, 2000–2007)
- Eric Harthen (audio producer/celebrity impersonator, 2000–2004)
- Chuck Gaidica (weatherman/frequent guest co-host, 2000–2002)
- Kyra Dillard (co-host, 2006–2009)
- Rob Graham (social media/web-content director, 2008–2011)
- Fletch (audio producer, 2010–2013)
- Randi (associate producer, 2011–2015)
- Calvin (social media/web-content director, 2013–2015)
- Slim (audio producer, 2013–2018)
- Ashley Nics (audio producer, 2019–2020)
- Kirby Gwen (audio producer, 2020-2020)
- Joey (social media/web-content director, 2016–2020)
- Rachel Giordano (executive producer, 2007–2020)
- Producer Ellen (executive producer, 2020–2022)
- Rhys (social media/web-content director, 2021–2023)
- Spike (co-host, 2000–2023)
- "KP" Kristin Penrose (Director of Social Impact, executive producer 2022–2025)
- Meaghan Mick (Toledo affiliate host, 2017–2025)

== Benchmark segments and events ==
The show features multiple segments that focus on elements such as the lives of the hosts, their guests, celebrities, and pop culture.

War of the Roses
Held every Thursday, the segment consists of Shannon calling a listener's significant other that is believed to be cheating. She pretends to be a florist offering a dozen free roses to be sent to the person of their choosing, with the possibility for the potentially unfaithful partner to send the flowers to the wrong person.

Phone Scams
This segment had the host Spike prank calling a victim selected via requests on the show's official website. It is held each morning and notable victims of the segment have included Donald Trump, Ludacris, Charlie Sheen and The Chainsmokers. On a November 2013 broadcast, the hosts noted that Spike had completed his 1,000th phone scam on the program. On the May 3, 2023 broadcast, the hosts noted that the daily Phone Scams feature would no longer air out of respect to former co-host Spike who was inexplicably removed from the show: “Without Spike, we’re not going to do it.”

Senseless Survey
This segment used to air each Tuesday and is similar to the Phone Scams, and was initially created in 2009 by Spike in response to news that the U.S. Census Bureau was having difficulty with the official 2010 United States census.

Street Scams
The show pranked people in person rather than on the phone and the results of the practical joke are shared live on the air and later when social media was invented, in online videos.

Dirty on the Thirty
An hourly celebrity gossip segment hosted by Shannon.

Throwback Throwdown
Every Friday show members compete in a contest similar to Name That Tune where they must identify songs from the 1980s, '90s and 2000s. If songs are identified correctly, listeners have the ability to win prizes.

Second Date Update
Each week, the show attempts to find out why a listener isn't getting a call back after a first date. This usually results in the show calling the "date" on the air to ask direct, revealing questions.

Break Up or Make Up
Romantic couples share details of their relationship struggles to determine if listeners believe the couple should remain together.

Six on Sex
In this segment Mojo encourages a listener to call his or her parents and listen to Mojo ask the caller six personal questions about their sex life while the call is played on air. If the parent does not hang up before the questions are answered, the caller wins a prize.

5 @ 655
Two listeners battle each morning in a quiz of recent pop culture headlines. The winner continues to play again the next morning while the loser gets a prize. After fifteen wins, the caller then challenges Shannon in a game called 'Smarter than Shannon'

Five Lies to Tell Your Mom
Each week, the show airs a phone call between a listener and his or her mother. The listener volunteers to convincingly tell his or her mom all five lies created by the show to encourage a dramatic response from the shocked mom. The goal is for the listener to keep his or her mom on the phone throughout the entire call.

Am I The A-Hole
Every Tuesday morning at 9am the show talks to a listener who asks if they are considered "an a-hole" for something they are doing their life. The feature allows listeners to also weigh in with advice.

Singles Mingle
The show hosts several parties throughout the year for single listeners to meet a mate. The parties are usually themed and are by invitation only. Entertainment for the party can include a live performance from a national recording artist and the parties have been attended by people such as Mike Posner, Flo Rida, Kesha, Paris Hilton, Ne-Yo and Jessica Simpson.

Town Tour
Every summer the show's staff broadcasts live from various cities within their listening area, where they encourage listeners to attend the broadcast, which is usually outdoors.

== Ratings, reception, and audience ==
Mojo in the Morning has been broadcast in locations such as Arizona, Ohio, Florida, Virginia, Mississippi and Michigan, and the show has been frequently ranked as a "Top Five morning show" in Detroit's Arbitron/Nielsen PPM Radio Ratings. The show has also been voted as "Best Radio Morning Show" in many Detroit publications such as The Detroit News, Metro Times, and Real Detroit Weekly. In 2013, Mojo was named along with Howard Stern, Rush Limbaugh and Ryan Seacrest as one of the "Top 25 Radio Personalities of the Last 25 Years" according to Talentmaster, a talk radio industry publication. In 2022, Mojo In The Morning was nominated to the Radio Hall of Fame along with 23 other nominees for induction from a list of more than 2,500 suggestions to the Nominating Committee. In 2025 Mojo was award the honor of induction into the National Radio Hall Of Fame. https://www.radiohalloffame.com/2025-inductees

== Notable broadcasts and controversies ==
Several of the segments and broadcasts run by Mojo in the Morning have received attention from the national media, such as a 2013 segment where they had someone impersonate actor Ryan Gosling. In 2012 singer Justin Bieber left an interview early because he disliked comparisons to Justin Timberlake and jokes about Harry Styles being attracted to older women, including Bieber's mom. As a result, Mojo (who had been hosting the interview) was briefly suspended from the show. The show also received notice for a series of phone calls between Eminem and his ex-wife Kimberly Mathers, where each would reveal personal information about the other person on the radio broadcast for all to hear.

Other show segments seen as controversial include the show hiring an airplane to fly a banner over downtown Detroit referencing the conviction of former Detroit mayor Kwame Kilpatrick; Spike trespassing on the set of Glee; a faux funeral for the Detroit Lions NFL football team due to its poor playing;, an April Fool's Day joke in which Mojo shared that the Detroit Red Wings hockey team would be relocated across the Detroit River to Canada as a cost-cutting move. and photos of Miss USA winner Rima Fakih participating in a "Stripper 101" contest sponsored by the show. In 2012 the show was threatened with legal action by former staff member Rob Graham, who claimed that the show violated HIPAA laws by discussing his personal medical history on air and that he had been encouraged to post copyrighted information on the show's official website. A lawsuit was never filed. When Detroit's NHL team built a new arena in 2017, Spike "stole" the zamboni and drove it—without team permission—through rush hour traffic to the new arena.

On July 28, 2026, former Mojo In The Morning cohost Spike returned to the public eye in the form of a podcast. In the first three episodes of 'Spike & Hank', Spike detailed his firing from the Mojo In The Morning show and his loss of friendship with Mojo who quickly replaced him with a new cohost Mojo described as a friend. Spike revealed that he was not fired or laid off. Instead he was removed from the show but kept as an employee. He was paid for three years to stay off the radio and not compete with Mojo's show.
