= KGMS =

Religious radio station in Tucson, Arizona

- Tucson, Arizona; United States
- Broadcast area: Tucson metropolitan area
- Frequency: 940 kHz
- Branding: 940 AM KGMS

Programming
- Format: Christian radio
- Affiliations: Wilkins Radio Network

Ownership
- Owner: Robert and Luann Wilkins; (Tucson Christian Radio, Inc.)

History
- First air date: August 10, 1963
- Former call signs: KMBO (1960–1961); KOBY (1961–1963); KHOS (1963–1977); KMGX (1977–1981); KNST (1981–1993); KWFM (1993–1994); KCEE (1994–2001)
- Call sign meaning: Good Message

Technical information
- Licensing authority: FCC
- Facility ID: 53592
- Class: B
- Power: 1,000 watts (day); 250 watts (night)
- Transmitter coordinates: 32°12′4″N 111°1′2″W

Links
- Public license information: Public file; LMS
- Webcast: Listen live
- Website: wilkinsradio.com/our-stations/kgms-940am-tucson-az/

KGMS (940 AM) is a commercial radio station licensed to Tucson, Arizona, United States, and serving the Tucson metropolitan area. Owned by Robert and Luann Wilkins, through licensee Tucson Christian Radio, Inc., it carries a Christian format as part of the Wilkins Radio Network. KGMS is also simulcast on KNXN in Sierra Vista, Arizona, to provide coverage southeast of Tucson.

== History ==
=== Early years ===
KGMS began as a request for a construction permit, filed in 1958 for a new station on 940 kHz in Tucson, Arizona. Prior to beginning operations, it was assigned the call letters KMBO in 1960 and KOBY in 1961. The station signed on the air on August 10, 1963, as KHOS and it aired a full service, country music format. KHOS was an affiliate of the ABC Information Radio Network.

On September 1, 1977, it switched to adult contemporary music and changed its call letters to KMGX. In July 1981, it flipped to a talk radio format as KNST. The KNST call letters and format were moved to 790 AM in April 1993. Meanwhile, 940 AM changed its call letters to KWFM. The next year the call sign was changed to KCEE, and the station became KGMS in 2001.

=== Expanded Band assignment ===
On March 17, 1997, the Federal Communications Commission (FCC) announced that 88 stations had been given permission to move to newly available "Expanded Band" transmitting frequencies, ranging from 1610 to 1700 kHz. KCEE was authorized to move from 940 kHz to 1630 kHz.

However, KCEE never procured the construction permit needed to implement the authorization, so the expanded band station was never built, and KCEE remained on 940 kHz.
