= KTZR (AM) =

Radio station in Tucson, Arizona

Coordinates: 32°12′4″N 110°56′48″W

- Tucson, Arizona; United States
- Frequency: 1450 kHz
- Branding: Fox Sports 1450

Programming
- Format: Sports radio
- Affiliations: Fox Sports Radio; Tucson Roadrunners; Tucson Sugar Skulls

Ownership
- Owner: iHeartMedia; (iHM Licenses, LLC)
- Sister stations: KHUD; KMMA; KNST; KOHT; KRQQ; KXEW

History
- First air date: 1947
- Former call signs: KCLB (CP, 1946); KOPO (1946–1957); KOLD (1957–1969); KOPO (1969–1977); KFLT (1977–1986); KKPW (1986–1988); KFXX (1988); KTZR (1988–2003); KWFM (2003–2011)
- Call sign meaning: "Tucson Z Rock" former affiliation

Technical information
- Licensing authority: FCC
- Facility ID: 68316
- Class: C
- Power: 1,000 watts unlimited

Links
- Public license information: Public file; LMS
- Webcast: Listen live (via iHeartRadio)
- Website: foxsports1450.iheart.com

KTZR (1450 kHz) is a commercial AM radio station located in Tucson, Arizona. KTZR airs a sports radio format. Its studios are located north of downtown Tucson along Oracle Road, while the transmitter site is southeast of downtown.

== History ==
As KWFM, the station played an oldies format that played rock and roll hits of the 1950s and 1960s as "Cool 1450". KWFM became "Funny 1450", a comedy station, at 10 a.m. on January 26, 2011. The last song on "Cool" was "Hello, Goodbye" by The Beatles. On November 28, 2011, the station changed its format to Spanish adult hits, branded as "La Preciosa 1450" under new calls, KTZR.

On September 25, 2016, iHeartMedia announced that KTZR would flip to news/talk the following day. The new "Talk Of Tucson" duplicated some of the programming of sister station KNST in different timeslots. The Glenn Beck Radio Program added a live clearance on KTZR while continuing on KNST on a delay. Other shows that aired on KTZR included Trending Today with Rusty Humphries, The Savage Nation, Michael Berry, Rob Hunter, America Now with Meghan McCain, Ground Zero with Clyde Lewis, and Alex Jones. KTZR also became the flagship for the new Tucson Roadrunners of the American Hockey League, as well as the Tucson radio affiliate of the NFL’s Arizona Cardinals.

On July 24, 2017, KTZR changed formats from news/talk to sports, branded as "Fox Sports 1450" in reflection of its Fox Sports Radio affiliation.
