= Vance International Airways =

Small US charter carrier that became McCulloch (1960–1970)

Vance International Airways Charter International Airlines
- Founded: 1965 (incorporated in Washington State)
- Commenced operations: 17 December 1960
- Ceased operations: 3 November 1970 (renamed McCulloch International Airlines)
- Operating bases: Seattle, Washington
- Fleet size: 2
- Headquarters: Seattle, Washington; United States
- Key people: Stanley G. Silver; Robert P. McCulloch
- Founder: Vance B. Roberts

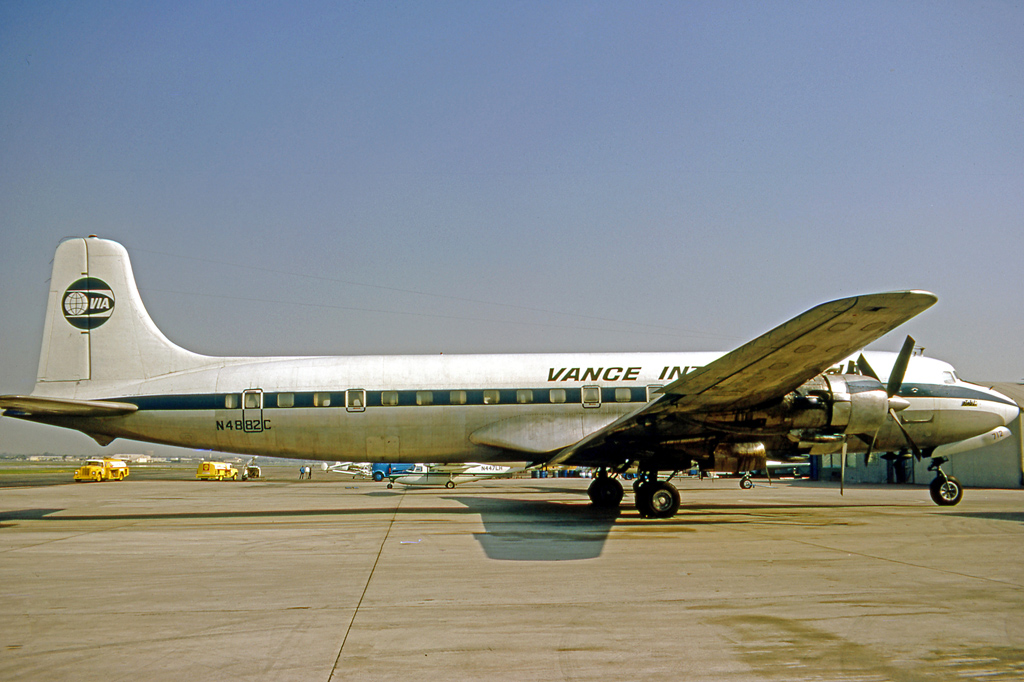
DC-7B at Long Beach in February 1971, after the sale to McCulloch

Vance International Airlines (VIA) was a small US air taxi and supplemental air carrier, a type of airline defined and regulated by the Civil Aeronautics Board (CAB), a now defunct Federal agency that from 1938 to 1978, tightly regulated almost all commercial air transportation in the United States. VIA was named after Vance B. Roberts, an example of a company named for the first name rather than last name of its founder.

By the time VIA was sold in 1970 to McCulloch Properties, Inc. (a property development company controlled by Robert P. McCulloch) Vance Roberts had already been forced out, albeit at the behest of McCulloch. McCulloch was an entrepreneur known for, among other things, the eponymous chainsaw brand and as founder and promoter of Lake Havasu City, Arizona. McCulloch wanted the airline, which he renamed McCulloch International Airlines, to certificate the air operation he was already running to take potential inhabitants to visit the new lakeside city (and other real estate developments).

VIA was renamed Charter International Airlines briefly before it was sold to McCulloch.

== History ==
Vance B. Roberts was a barnstomer and instructor pilot prior to World War II, and an instructor for B-17 and B-29 bombers during the war. After the war he operated a number of profitable aircraft and airline related businesses at Boeing Field in Seattle, Washington, including contract work flying C-46 aircraft and Northwest Air Service, an air taxi operator. It was in that name, as a sole proprietorship, that he applied to the CAB in 1959 for authority to fly charters with a DC-3 and a C-46. The CAB approved his application as of 15 July 1960, not in the name of Northwest Air Service (which it saw it saw as conflicting with Northwest Airlines) but Vance Roberts himself. Roberts retained the right to continue to operate the air taxi. The certificate was effective 17 December 1960. In February/May 1961, the CAB approved and then denied Roberts's request to use the trade name Olympic Airways, after the Greek carrier of that name objected.

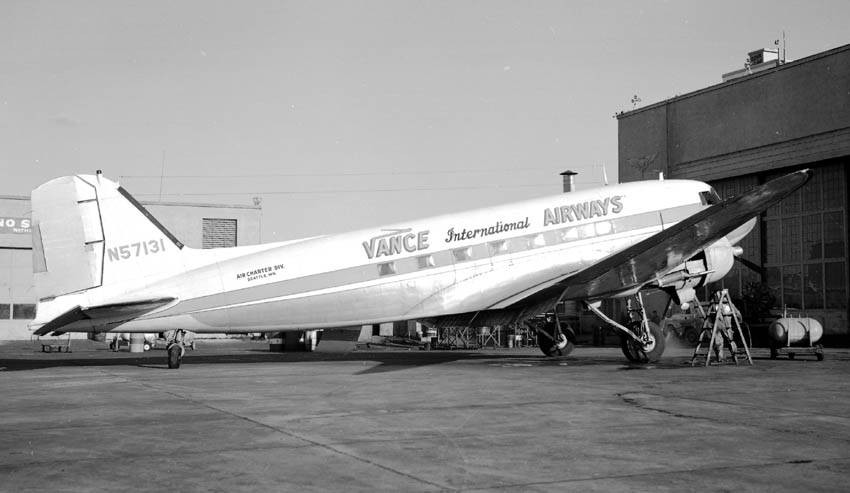
DC-3 at Oakland 1965

Progress was slow. Charter revenue (not including air taxi) was $8,000, $23,000 and $17,000 in 1961, 1962 and 1963 respectively, but increased that 10 times in 1964 after adding a DC-7. In February 1965, Vance was approved to run a series of weekend scheduled flights between Twin Falls, Idaho and San Francisco and Los Angeles on behalf of Sun Valley ski resort using a DC-7. It was marketed as Vance International Airways (VIA) and on 16 April 1965, the CAB approved the transfer of Vance Roberts's supplemental certificate to the Washington State corporate entity Vance International Airways, Inc. However, in September 1965 it failed an inspection by the military, followed by the Federal Aviation Agency suspending its operating license. When the CAB came to award permanent supplemental certificates in September 1966, VIA's case was deferred, leaving it with a temporary certificate.

In May 1966 VIA took money from outside investors, led by Stanley G. Silver, allowing a resumption of operations with a single DC-7 in August 1966. The carrier's FAA operating certificate was suspended from 18 October 1965 to 12 August 1966. The CAB awarded VIA a permanent supplemental certificate on 16 August 1967. The Silver agreement allowed his group to take its stake up to 50% and to force Roberts or the Silver group to buy each other out in certain circumstances. Robert P. McCulloch, already flying potential customers to Lake Havasu City with a uncertificated fleet of Lockheed Electras and Constellations, wanted the VIA certificate to turn his air operation into an airline. He funded the Silver group who by 7 January 1970 forced out Roberts. Roberts received $1 million, worth over $7.5 million in 2024 terms. In 1969 and 1970 the airline generated about $500,000 in annual revenue with two DC-7s. Piston equipment left the airline cut off from many potential customers, such as the US military, and the CAB viewed the airline as "deteriorating".

On 7 July, the CAB approved a name change from Vance International Airways to Charter International Airlines. The CAB approved the sale to McCulloch from the Silver group on 18 September 1970. On 3 November 1970, the CAB re-issued the supplemental certificate in the name of McCulloch International Airlines.

== Fleet ==
The July 1970 US Civil Aircraft Register shows Vance International owning two Douglas DC-7s, N6318C and N4882C. The Douglas DC-3 in the picture above, N57131, was registered in the name of Vance Roberts.

== Legacy ==
The legacy of Vance International Airways was McCulloch International Airlines.

== See also ==
- McCulloch International Airlines
- Supplemental air carrier
- List of defunct airlines of the United States
