= McCulloch International Airlines =

US charter airline (1970–1977)

- Commenced operations: 3 November 1970 re-named from Vance International Airways
- Ceased operations: 1 August 1977 files for bankruptcy
- Operating bases: Long Beach, California
- Fleet size: see Fleet below
- Parent company: McCulloch Properties (until October 1975); FGH Financial (from October 1975)
- Headquarters: Long Beach, California, United States
- Key people: John E. Gallagher, President; Francis T. Fox; Richard F.B. Goates; John L. Holleran
- Founder: Robert P. McCulloch

McCulloch International Airlines (MIA) was a supplemental air carrier, a charter carrier regulated by the Civil Aeronautics Board (CAB), the now-defunct Federal agency that from 1938 to 1978 tightly controlled almost all commercial air transportation in the United States. The airline was created from Vance International Airways (VIA), an earlier supplemental air carrier, and from the aviation activities of Robert P. McCulloch, an entrepreneur (still known for the eponymous chainsaw brand he developed) and industrialist who flew potential customers to see new communities he was developing, most notably Lake Havasu City.

The airline was sold to a management/investor group in 1975. Unfortunately, its fortunes took a quick turn for the worse and the airline was bankrupt by 1977.

MIA operated the Starship for Peter Frampton for his 1976 European tour at the height of his fame. This Boeing 720 jet aircraft (flown by other operators) had previously been used for other famous rock tours during the 1970s such as Led Zeppelin, the Rolling Stones, Bob Dylan and The Band, Elton John and the Allman Brothers as well as other musical artists.

== History ==
=== Context ===
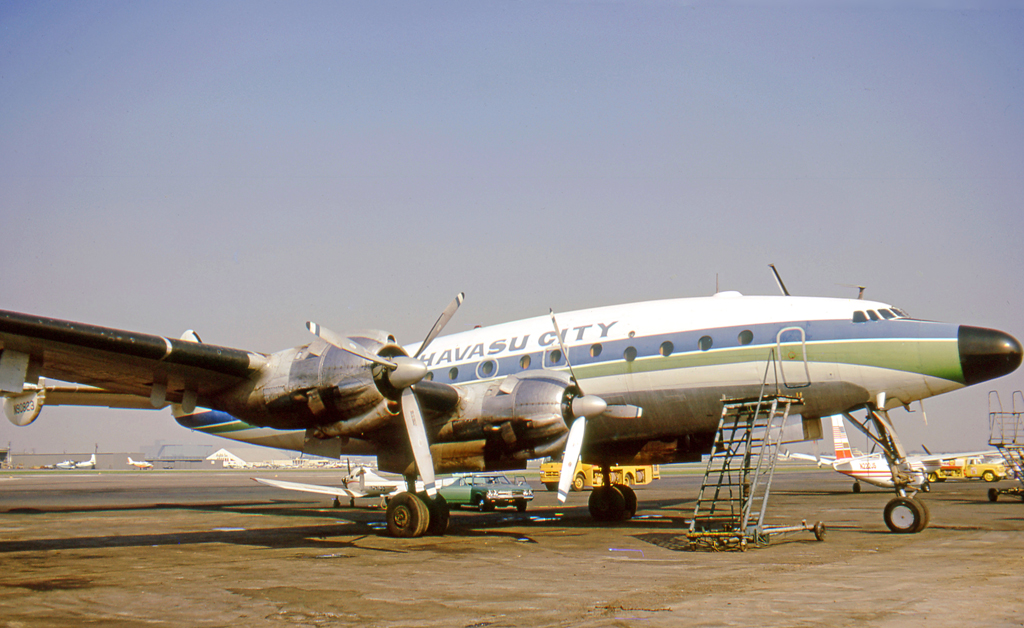
McCulloch Properties (MPI) Constellation at Long Beach 1971. Not a McCulloch International Airlines aircraft, this is from MPI's pre-airline activity, thus Lake Havasu City titles. See External links for McCulloch Electra photo

Robert P. McCulloch controlled a property development company, McCulloch Properties, Inc., (MPI) that developed land in the American west, the most famous site being Lake Havasu City. Starting in January 1964, McCulloch flew prospective buyers to Lake Havasu for free using a fleet of Lockheed Constellations and then Electras as an uncertificated carrier. To qualify for a trip, a potential buyer put down a deposit, which was fully refundable. At the time MPI sought to purchase VIA, it was flying potential customers from Detroit, Cleveland, Chicago, Milwaukee, Minneapolis, Denver, Phoenix, Dallas, Long Beach, Oakland, Houston, Portland, Spokane, and Seattle. The July 1970 US civil aircraft register shows MPI as the registered owner of three Constellations and five Electras (details in Fleet below). MPI wanted to certificate its air operation so it could sell charters when the fleet was not transporting prospective property customers; MPI projected post-acquisition Vance making almost as much revenue in 1971 from third parties as from captive MPI business.

Vance International Airways was a small, unsuccessful Seattle-based supplemental air carrier, doing about $500,000 per year in revenue in 1968 and 1969; the CAB viewed the carrier as "deteriorating". In 1966 VIA accepted financing that in certain circumstances allowed the new investor to acquire 50% of the carrier, and in some circumstances required the existing owner, Vance Roberts, to buy out the investor or vice versa. McCulloch worked with this investor to exercise those options, forcing out Roberts with the investor turning over the carrier to McCulloch after the CAB approved the transaction on 18 September 1970. On 3 November 1970 the CAB approved a name change to McCulloch International Airlines (MIA).

MPI's total acquisition cost for MIA was about $1.4 million, equivalent to over $10 million in 2024 dollars.

=== Wholly-owned subsidiary until October 1975 ===
MPI moved the headquarters of the airline to Long Beach, California from Seattle. New ownership made an immediate difference, as 1971 MIA revenues were over 20 times the level of Vance International in the late 1960s. However, MPI accounted for 85% of 1971 revenues and 80% of 1972 revenues. This was far greater than what projections called for (54% in 1971), indicating less diversified revenues than desired. And even with the captive income, MIA was small relative other supplemental carriers. In 1971, the biggest supplemental carriers had revenues over five times that of MIA, and did that without captive income. MIA also did not participate much in the biggest charter market, international. In 1973, for instance, international passenger miles were over four times those of domestic for supplemental carriers, but for MIA it was the other way around. Further, MIA did no military business at all, nor did it attempt air freight, though the Electra was a popular freighter.

McCulloch International Airlines Financial Results, 1971 thru 1977
| USD 000 | 1971 | 1972 | 1973 | 1974 | 1975 | 1976 | 1977 |
|---|---|---|---|---|---|---|---|
| Operating revenue | 11,537 | 15,384 | 11,813 | 8,616 | 7,785 | 8,239 | 4,494 |
| Operating profit (loss) | 903 | (781) | 927 | (48) | (600) | (1,875) | (914) |
| Operating margin (%) | 7.8 | -5.1 | 7.8 | -0.6 | -7.7 | -22.8 | -20.3 |

=== FGH Financial ownership until August 1977 bankruptcy ===
In October 1975, FGH Financial acquired 81% of the airline. FGH comprised four equal partners, Francis T. Fox, John E. Gallagher, Richard F.B. Goates and John L. Holleran. Gallagher was the president of MIA, the other three were California-based transportation consultants or executives. The MPI land business was slowing and MIA was operating only three Electras, a fourth was on short-term lease to Pacific Southwest Airlines and MIA had leased in a Douglas DC-8 which was flying mostly third-party charter business. McCulloch Properties wanted to step back and allow MIA to develop a third party business by re-equipping with jets. FGH paid $1.5 million (over $8.5 million in 2024 dollars) for 81% of the company, with MPI financing about $400,000 of that. For the price, FGH also received the four Electras, plus spare engines and parts. FGH financed the sale price with a bank loan and planned to sell the Electras over time.

Unfortunately, FGH found the environment, coming out of the 1973–1975 recession, hostile relative to the aim of reequipping with new/newer aircraft, and was forced to rely on the Electras. MIA also flew a series of smaller first-generation (turbojet vs turbofan) jet aircraft such as the Boeing 720 during this time. One such jet was the Starship aircraft MIA flew when it sold, for $146,000, a charter to Peter Frampton to support his European tour (this required CAB approval since MIA did not have Europe charter authority). The company filed for bankruptcy 1 August 1977. A year later, the CAB approved the takeover of the remains of MIA by a company called Inomotivator (comprising three lawyers), but nothing came of that.

== Fleet ==
The US Civil Aircraft Register for July 1970 shows McCulloch Properties owning three Lockheed L-049 Constellations (N6000C, N90823, N90931) and five Lockheed L-188 Electras (N6106A, N6118A, N6130A, N6131A, N6132A).

The US Civil Aircraft Register for July 1972 shows McCulloch International Airlines owning nine Lockheed L-188 Electras (N6106A, N6112A, N6118A, N6124A, N6126A, N6129A, N6130A, N6131A, N6132A)

== Legacy ==
The most obvious legacy of McCulloch International Airlines is Lake Havasu City in Arizona. From 1964 to 1978, MPI promotional flights (including those, from November 1970, flown by MIA) to Lake Havasu City totalled 2,702. in 1970, when the CAB was deciding whether to approve MPI's purchase of Vance International, MPI had already sold over $118 million of land in Lake Havasu City, equivalent to over $900 million in 2024 dollars.

== See also ==
- Supplemental air carrier
- List of defunct airlines of the United States
