= McCulloch TSIR-5190 =

- Type: Air-cooled five-cylinder radial piston aircraft engine
- National origin: United States
- Manufacturer: McCulloch Motors Corporation

The TSIR-5190 is a five cylinder two-stroke radial piston aircraft engine developed for aircraft applications by McCulloch Motors Corporation.

Joe Crover and his father patented new technologies to complete development of the engine for production use. A pair of TRAD-4180s four cylinder diesels and a single TSIR-5190 from the Western Museum of Flight are in use for development.

== Specifications (TSIR-5190) ==
=== General characteristics ===
- Type: Five-cylinder liquid cooled radial engine
- Displacement: 190 cu in (3,114 cc)

=== Components ===
- Oil system: dry sump
- Cooling system: liquid cooled

=== Performance ===
- Power output: 270 hp (201 kW) @ 3600 rpm
