= Crystal Beach, Arizona =

- Unincorporated community Census-designated place
- Location within Arizona Location within the United States
- Coordinates: 34°34′17″N 114°23′33″W
- Country: United States
- State: Arizona
- County: Mohave

Area
  - Total: 0.34 sq mi (0.88 km^{2})
  - Land: 0.34 sq mi (0.88 km^{2})
  - Water: 0 sq mi (0.00 km^{2})
- Elevation: 522 ft (159 m)

Population (2020)
  - Total: 250
  - Density: 738.9/sq mi (285.28/km^{2})
- Time zone: UTC-7 (MST)
- ZIP code: 86404
- Area code: 928
- FIPS code: 04-17500
- GNIS feature ID: 2582767

Crystal Beach is an unincorporated community in Mohave County, Arizona, United States. The population was 250 at the 2020 census. For statistical purposes, the United States Census Bureau has defined Crystal Beach as a census-designated place (CDP).

== Geography ==
Crystal Beach is located in western Mohave County and is bordered to the south by Desert Hills. Lake Havasu City is 7 miles (11 km) to the south. According to the United States Census Bureau, the Crystal Beach CDP has a total area of .34 square miles (0.88 km^{2}), all land.

== Demographics ==
Historical population
Census	Pop.	Note	%±
2010	279		—
2020	250		−10.4%
U.S. Decennial Census

As of the 2010 census, there were 279 people living in the CDP: 143 male and 136 female. 31 were 19 years old or younger, 10 were ages 20–34, 32 were between the ages of 35 and 49, 39 were between 50 and 64, and the remaining 31 were aged 65 and above. The median age was 50.4 years.

The racial makeup of the CDP was 92.5% White, 1.8% Native American, 1.1% Other, and 4.7% Two or more races. 7.5% of the population were Hispanic or Latino of any race.

There were 131 households in the CDP, 72 family households (55%) and 59 non-family households (45%), with an average household size of 2.11. Of the family households, 48 were married couples living together, 9 were single fathers, and 15 were single mothers, while the non-family households consisted of 48 adults living alone: 29 male and 19 female.

The CDP contained 171 housing units, of which 131 were occupied and 40 were vacant.

== Education ==
It is in the Lake Havasu Unified School District, which operates Lake Havasu High School.
