= Desert Hills, Arizona =

CDP in Mohave County, Arizona

- Census-designated place
- Location in Mohave County and the state of Arizona

- Location within Arizona Location within the United States
- Coordinates: 34°32′51″N 114°22′0″W
- Country: United States
- State: Arizona
- County: Mohave

Area
  - Total: 4.90 sq mi (12.68 km^{2})
  - Land: 4.31 sq mi (11.15 km^{2})
  - Water: 0.59 sq mi (1.53 km^{2})
- Elevation: 525 ft (160 m)

Population (2020)
  - Total: 2,764
  - Density: 641.9/sq mi (247.84/km^{2})
- Time zone: UTC-7 (MST)
- ZIP code: 86404
- Area code: 928
- FIPS code: 04-18740
- GNIS feature ID: 2408664

Desert Hills is an unincorporated community and census-designated place (CDP) in Mohave County, Arizona, United States. The population was 2,764 at the 2020 census, up from 2,245 at the 2010 census.

== Geography ==
Desert Hills is located in western Mohave County on the east side of the Colorado River, impounded as Lake Havasu. The CDP is bordered to the south and east by Lake Havasu City, to the north by Crystal Beach, and to the west, across the Colorado, by San Bernardino County, California. Arizona State Route 95 runs along the eastern edge of the CDP, leading south 4 miles (6 km) to the center of Lake Havasu City and north 18 miles (29 km) to Interstate 40.

According to the United States Census Bureau, the Desert Hills CDP has a total area of 4.9 square miles (13 km^{2}), of which 4.3 square miles (11 km^{2}) are land and 0.6 square miles (1.6 km^{2}), or 12.07%, are on the waters of Lake Havasu.

== Demographics ==
Historical population
Census	Pop.	Note	%±
2000	2,183		—
2010	2,245		2.8%
2020	2,764		23.1%
U.S. Decennial Census

=== 2020 census ===
As of the 2020 census, Desert Hills had a population of 2,764. The median age was 61.8 years. 10.2% of residents were under the age of 18 and 42.2% of residents were 65 years of age or older. For every 100 females there were 108.0 males, and for every 100 females age 18 and over there were 107.6 males age 18 and over.

95.4% of residents lived in urban areas, while 4.6% lived in rural areas.

There were 1,373 households in Desert Hills, of which 11.4% had children under the age of 18 living in them. Of all households, 49.1% were married-couple households, 22.1% were households with a male householder and no spouse or partner present, and 20.2% were households with a female householder and no spouse or partner present. About 31.9% of all households were made up of individuals and 19.9% had someone living alone who was 65 years of age or older.

There were 2,063 housing units, of which 33.4% were vacant. The homeowner vacancy rate was 1.2% and the rental vacancy rate was 7.7%.

Racial composition as of the 2020 census
Race	Number	Percent
White	2,326	84.2%
Black or African American	12	0.4%
American Indian and Alaska Native	27	1.0%
Asian	31	1.1%
Native Hawaiian and Other Pacific Islander	3	0.1%
Some other race	143	5.2%
Two or more races	222	8.0%
Hispanic or Latino (of any race)	352	12.7%

=== 2000 census ===
As of the census of 2000, there were 2,183 people, 997 households, and 677 families living in the CDP. The population density was 463.8 inhabitants per square mile (179.1/km^{2}). There were 1,463 housing units at an average density of 310.8 per square mile (120.0/km^{2}). The racial makeup of the CDP was 93.1% White, 0.1% Black or African American, 0.6% Native American, 0.4% Asian, 4.4% from other races, and 1.4% from two or more races. 9.3% of the population were Hispanic or Latino of any race.

There were 997 households, out of which 17.8% had children under the age of 18 living with them, 55.7% were married couples living together, 7.5% had a female householder with no husband present, and 32.0% were non-families. 25.2% of all households were made up of individuals, and 12.8% had someone living alone who was 65 years of age or older. The average household size was 2.19 and the average family size was 2.54.

In the CDP, the population was spread out, with 16.6% under the age of 18, 5.0% from 18 to 24, 19.9% from 25 to 44, 31.1% from 45 to 64, and 27.4% who were 65 years of age or older. The median age was 52 years. For every 100 females, there were 99.7 males. For every 100 females age 18 and over, there were 99.5 males.

The median income for a household in the CDP was $26,678, and the median income for a family was $32,685. Males had a median income of $21,690 versus $20,433 for females. The per capita income for the CDP was $14,322. About 10.5% of families and 14.1% of the population were below the poverty line, including 14.4% of those under age 18 and 11.0% of those age 65 or over.

== Education ==
It is in the Lake Havasu Unified School District, which operates Lake Havasu High School.
