= Jack Frazier =

American man taken hostage in Iraq

Jack Frazier (1937–2003) was an American man who was taken hostage in 1990 by Saddam Hussein's forces in Baghdad. Frazier was working on an oil project for Bechtel Corporation at the time he was taken captive.

Frazier was a diabetic and was denied his medication during his time as a hostage, which was close to one month. This affected him seriously, as he ended up losing his eyesight from one of his eyes as a consequence. Frazier sued the republic of Iraq in 1991, and in April 2003, Frazier was given the sum of 1,750,000 dollars as compensation. He was one of 180 people to successfully sue the Republic of Iraq.

Frazier moved to Nevada after his ordeal. On June 2 of 2003, he died in Lake Havasu City, Arizona, of complications related to his illness.
