= Lake Havasu Unified School District =

School district in Mohave County, Arizona

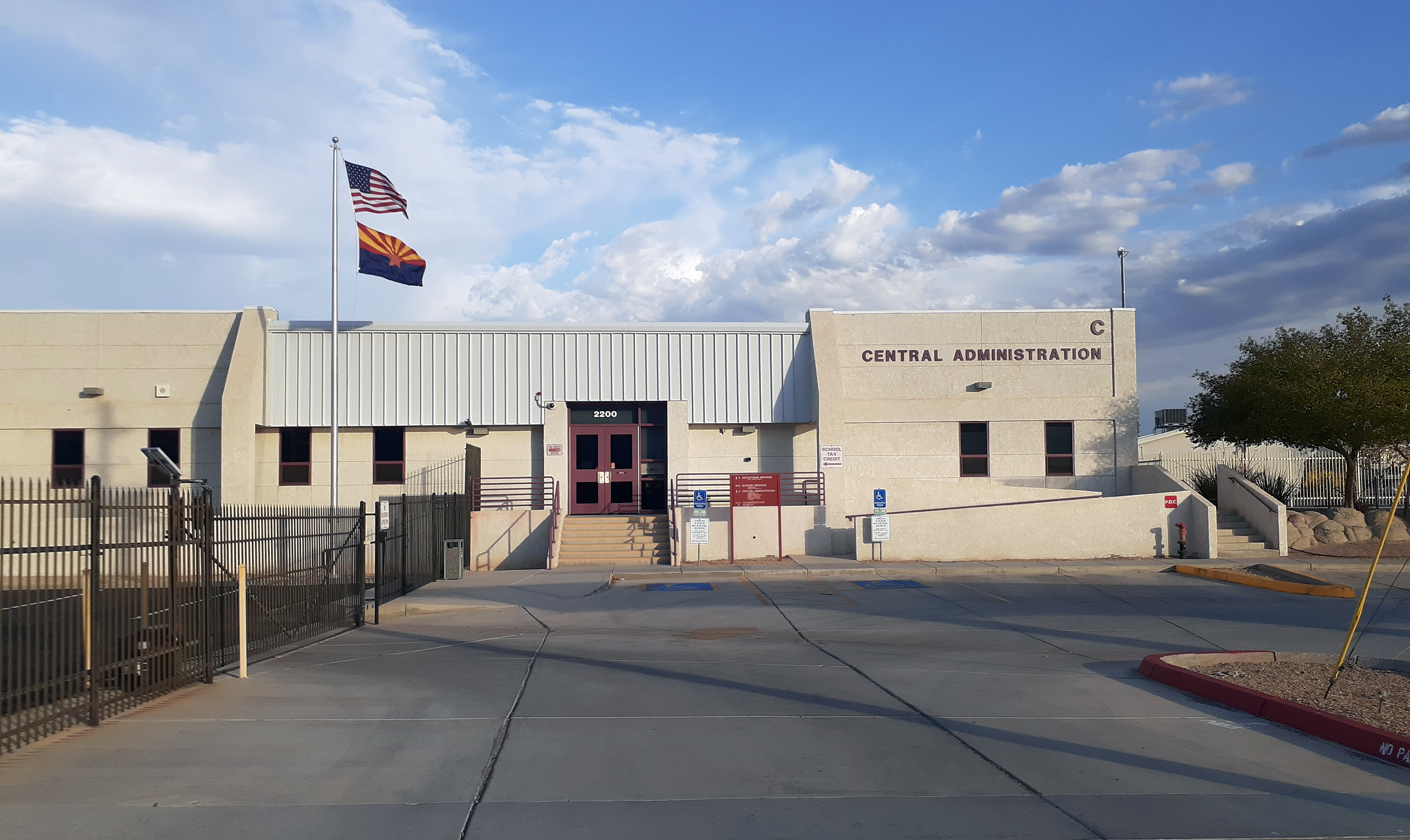

Address
- 2200 Havasupai Boulevard Lake Havasu City, Arizona, 86403; United States

District information
- Type: Public
- Grades: PreK–12
- NCES District ID: 0404280

Students and staff
- Students: 5,160
- Teachers: 258.0
- Staff: 289.52
- Student–teacher ratio: 20.0

Other information
- Website: www.lhusd.org

The Lake Havasu Unified School District is the school district headquartered in Lake Havasu City, Arizona. The superintendent is Rebecca Stone, PhD.

The district includes Lake Havasu, Crystal Beach, and Desert Hills.

== Schools ==
Secondary

- Lake Havasu High School
- Thunderbolt Middle School (7–8)

Elementary schools (K–6)

- Havasupai
- Jamaica
- Nautilus
- Oro Grande
- Smoketree
- Starline

Preschools

- Little Knights Preschool
- Nautilus Preschool
- Oro Grande Preschool
- Smoketree Developmental Preschool
