= Robert P. McCulloch =

American industrial entrepreneur (1911–1977)

Robert Paxton McCulloch
- Born: May 11, 1911; St. Louis, Missouri, U.S.
- Died: February 25, 1977 (aged 65); Los Angeles, California, U.S.
- Occupations: Entrepreneur, industrialist, city founder
- Spouse: Barbra Ann Briggs

Robert Paxton McCulloch (May 11, 1911 – February 25, 1977) was an American entrepreneur from Missouri, best known for McCulloch chainsaws and purchasing the "New" London Bridge, which he moved to Lake Havasu City, Arizona—one of the cities he founded.

== Biography ==
Robert Paxton McCulloch was born May 11, 1911, in Missouri to Richard McCulloch and Mary Grace Beggs. His grandfather, John I. Beggs, made his fortune by implementing Thomas Edison's electrical powerplants in cities around the world, manufacturing and selling electric trolley cars, and founding Milwaukee's public utility system. McCulloch, along with his two siblings, inherited his grandfather's fortune in 1925.

Two years after he graduated from Stanford University, he married Barbra Ann Briggs, whose father was Stephen Foster Briggs of Briggs & Stratton. His first manufacturing endeavor was McCulloch Engineering Company, located in Milwaukee, Wisconsin. There he built racing engines and superchargers. In his early 30s, he sold the company to Borg-Warner Corporation for US$1 million.

McCulloch then started McCulloch Aviation; and, in 1946, he changed his company's name to McCulloch Motors Corporation. Building small gasoline engines, his competitors included his in-laws and Ralph Evinrude. Evinrude led the market for boat motors, while Briggs & Stratton pulled ahead in the lawn mower and garden tractor market.

== Chainsaws ==
It was the chainsaw niche that McCulloch dominated, beginning with the first chainsaw with his name on it, manufactured in 1948. McCulloch's chainsaw was used to cut lake ice and trees. By the next year, McCulloch's model 3-25 further revolutionized the market with the one-man light weight chainsaw.

== Oil and development ==
In the 1950s, McCulloch started McCulloch Oil Corporation, which pursued oil and gas exploration, land development, and geothermal energy.

In spite of Evinrude's market lead, McCulloch continued to pursue the outboard market during the next decade. This led him to Lake Havasu, in Mohave County, Arizona, in search of a test site. McCulloch purchased 3,500 acres (1,400 ha) of lakeside property along Pittsburgh Point. In 1963, on the courthouse steps of Kingman, McCulloch purchased a 26-square-mile (67 km^{2}) parcel of barren desert that would become the site for Lake Havasu City. At the time it was the largest single tract of state land ever sold in Arizona, and the cost per acre was under US$75.

To spur the growth of the city, in 1964 McCulloch opened a chainsaw manufacturing plant there. Within two years there were three manufacturing plants, with some 400 employees. Other communities developed by McCulloch Oil include Fountain Hills, Arizona, Pueblo West, Colorado, and Spring Creek, Nevada.

== McCulloch International Airlines ==
Starting January 1964, McCulloch Properties flew prospective buyers into Lake Havasu City for free, a trip requiring a prospective buyer to make a fully-refundable deposit. This became a significant enterprise, with the property company acquiring over a half-dozen commercial aircraft and flying in prospective buyers from all over the United States. In 1970, McCulloch bought a small charter airline, Vance International Airways, to allow the air operation to become a certificated charter airline, McCulloch International Airlines. McCulloch Properties sold an 81% stake in the airline to a management/investor group in 1975, but the airline collapsed in 1977 shortly after McCulloch's death. 2,702 flights were made to Lake Havasu City for prospective buyers over the course of the program, from 1964 to 1978.

== Purchase of London Bridge ==
In 1968, McCulloch was searching for a unique attraction for his city, which eventually took him to London. By the early 1960s it was apparent that John Rennie's 1831 "New" London Bridge was gradually sinking into the River Thames and the City of London Corporation decided that a new bridge was needed. Rather than demolish the existing bridge, they decided to auction the historic landmark.

When casting his bid for the bridge, McCulloch doubled the estimated cost of dismantling the structure, which was US$1.2 million, bringing the price to US$2.4 million. He then added on US$60,000, a thousand dollars for each year of his age at the time he estimated the bridge would be raised in Arizona. His gesture earned him the winning bid, although there was very little competition.

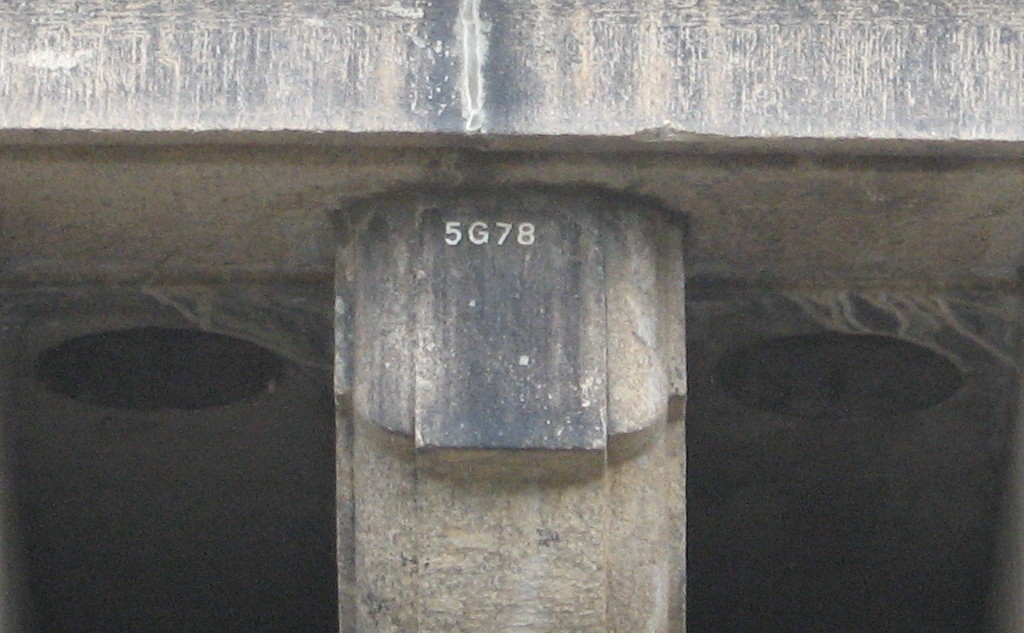
Numbered stones can still be seen at London Bridge in Lake Havasu City, Arizona

It took three years to complete the project. The structure was dismantled block by block, with each block marked with a number and its position catalogued. The granite pieces were stacked at the Surrey Commercial Docks, and then were shipped through the Panama Canal to Long Beach, California. From Long Beach, the granite blocks were trucked inland 300 miles (500 km). The bridge was reassembled by matching the numbered stones, and filling beneath the bridge with native soil for support during reconstruction. The work was done by Sundt Construction.

The attraction was opened on October 10, 1971, with elaborate fanfare: Fireworks, a parade, entertainment, and celebrities, such as Bonanza actor Lorne Greene and dignitaries such as the Lord Mayor of London.

With the purchase of the bridge, McCulloch accelerated his development campaign, increasing the number of flights into the city. At the time, the airport was located on the island. The free flights to Lake Havasu lasted until 1978 and reportedly they totalled 2,702 flights, bringing in 37,000 prospective buyers.

A popular urban legend is that McCulloch mistakenly believed that he was buying the more impressive Tower Bridge. Ivan Luckin, the council member who sold the bridge, replied "Of course not" when asked if McCulloch had believed that he was buying Tower Bridge.

== Death ==
McCulloch died February 25, 1977, in Los Angeles, of an accidental overdose of alcohol and barbiturates.

== World records ==
- World's largest antique – The London Bridge, Lake Havasu City, Arizona
- World's tallest fountain – Fountain Hills, Arizona

== Other inventions ==
McCulloch also developed a centrifugal supercharger for automotive use. At first, these were produced and sold under the McCulloch name. In 1956, the supercharger division was renamed Paxton Superchargers. Notable cars such as the 1954–1955 Kaiser Manhattan and the 1957 Studebaker Golden Hawk and Ford Thunderbird F-Type had a McCulloch/Paxton Supercharger. The supercharger was also used in CO_{2} scrubbers on Navy submarines.

The company produced one prototype automobile, the Paxton Phoenix, with a hard top that retracted over the trunk. The 1953 vehicle promoted alternative fuels and had a proposed steam engine. The division was sold in 1958, becoming Paxton Automotive, which remains in business.

McCulloch's diverse interests continued into the last years of his life. McCulloch built his first aircraft in 1971 (the same year the London Bridge officially opened), in Lake Havasu City. It was the McCulloch J-2 Gyroplane, a hybrid helicopter and airplane combination, and was tested in the summer of 1973 by James Patton, a NASA pilot. McCulloch's dream was to offer "an airplane in every garage", promoting a seemingly simple aircraft that was easy to fly and could take off from a driveway. He manufactured and sold about 100 of the aircraft, but the market never developed.

== Films ==
- Monumental Mysteries episode "Arizona's London Bridge" features an actor portraying McCulloch.

== Companies founded ==
- McCulloch Motors Corporation
- McCulloch Aircraft Corporation
- McCulloch Oil
- McCulloch International Airlines
- McCulloch Properties
- Paxton Automotive

== Cities founded ==
- Lake Havasu City, Arizona
- Fountain Hills, Arizona
- Pueblo West, Colorado
- Spring Creek, Nevada
