= Paxton Automotive =

American supercharger manufacturer

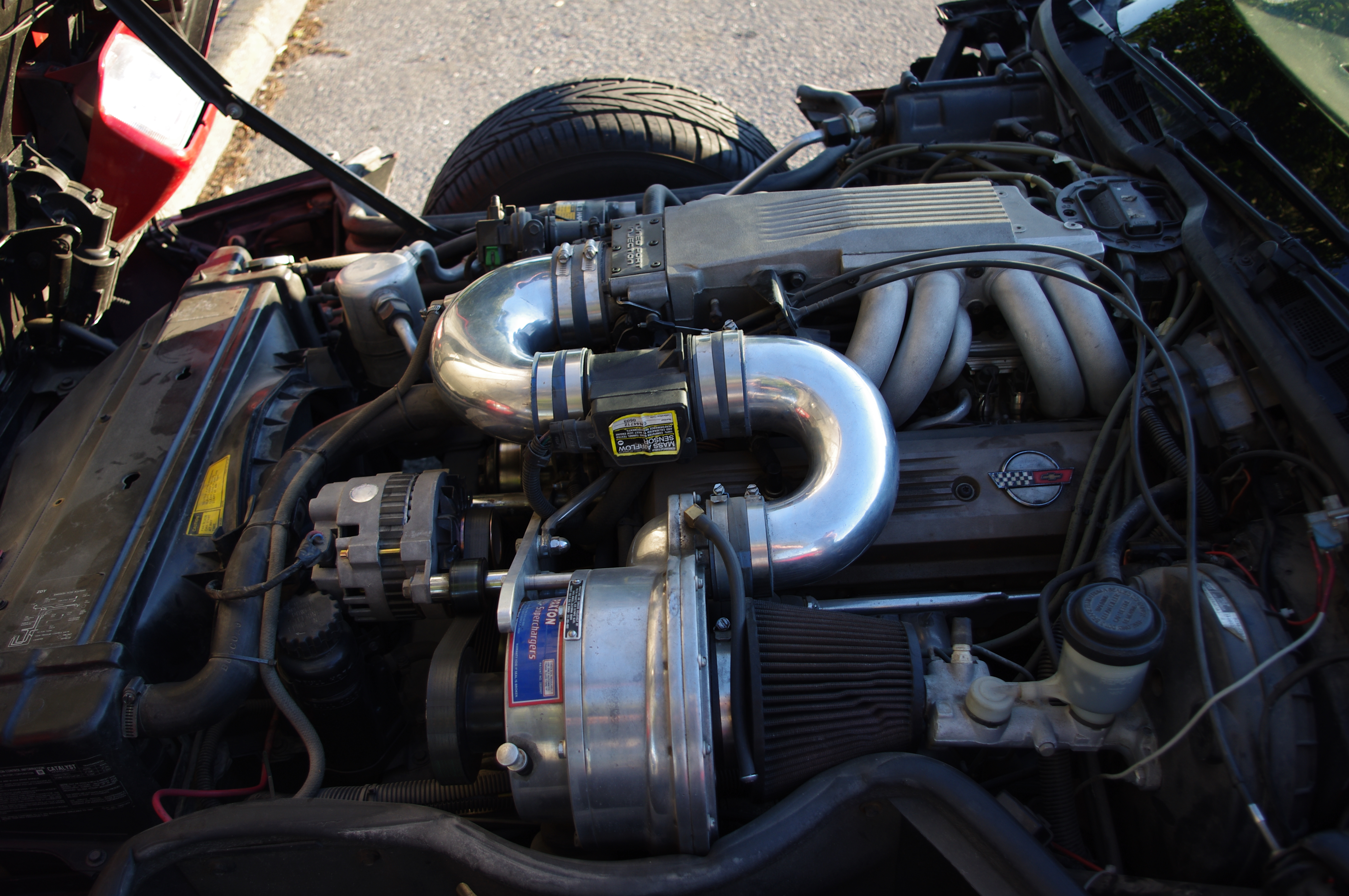
C4 Corvette fitted with Paxton SN-86 supercharger.

Paxton Automotive is a United States–based manufacturer of superchargers for automotive use. The company is the major proponent of the centrifugal type supercharger. Early products were offered under the McCulloch name. Some Paxton superchargers have been factory fitted, but most units sold have been aftermarket installed. Paxton products are possibly best known for their frequent use in performance-modified Ford Mustangs.

Inventor Robert Paxton McCulloch began producing superchargers to his design in 1937 for the Ford Flathead V8, a popular engine for performance modification at the time. The company estimates that around 5,000 were built before World War II stopped production.

Postwar, McCulloch developed a more sophisticated supercharger and began selling it in 1953. This was factory fitted to a number of vehicles at the time, including the Kaiser Manhattan, Packard Panther, Studebaker Golden Hawk, 1957 Packard Clipper and 1958 Packard Hawk.

In 1956, McCulloch set up a separate Paxton Superchargers division, selling it off in 1958. Supercharged engines were used for one successful year in NASCAR racing, after which forced induction was banned from the sport. For this purpose, Paxton superchargers were fitted as the rare (211 produced) F-option for the 1957 Ford Thunderbird.

In 1958 Andy Granatelli purchased Paxton Products, subsequently selling it to Studebaker Corporation in 1961.

For the 1962 and 1963 model years Studebaker used Paxton supercharges on its "R2" and "R3" high performance engines used in the Avanti and offered in the Hawk and Larks.

A short run of Shelby Mustangs were fitted with Paxton superchargers, and Ford dealers offered Paxton superchargers as a dealer-fitted Ford Mustang option from 1965 to 1972. Paxton still provides supercharger kits for older Mustangs as well as more recent models.

Still in business as a subsidiary of Vortech, Paxton now supplies complete supercharging kits for popular performance-modified cars, as well as bare superchargers for more customised installations.

One of the more unusual applications for the Paxton brand superchargers was as an air pump in the air purifying CO_{2} scrubbers of U.S. Navy submarines.

== See also ==
- Paxton Phoenix, a rear-engine coupé prototype developed in 1953
