= Paxton Phoenix =

Rear-engined prototype car developed in 1953

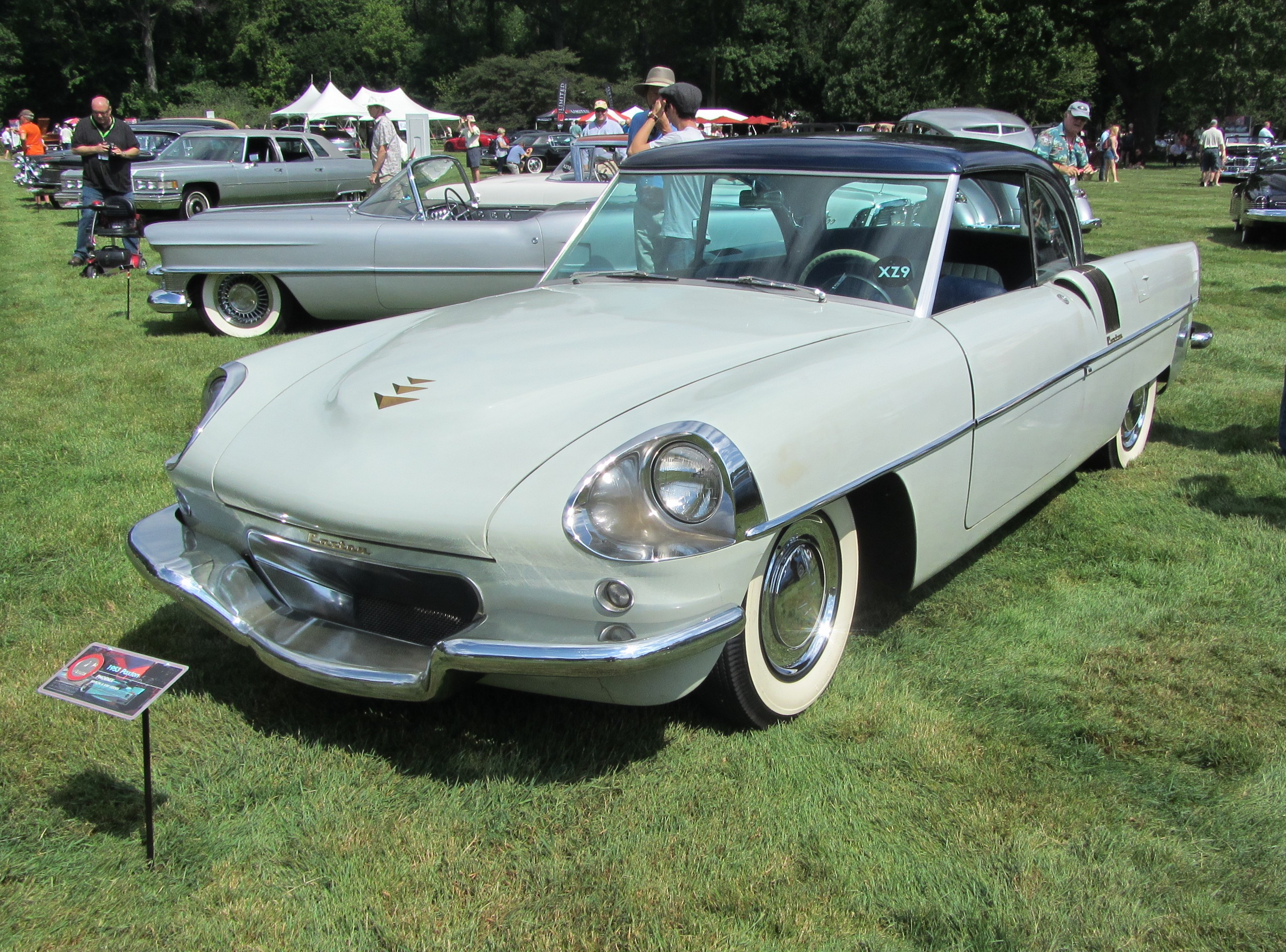
1953 Paxton Phoenix prototype

The Paxton Phoenix was a rear-engine coupé prototype developed in 1953 by Robert P. McCulloch's Paxton Automotive of Los Angeles, California, a division of his chainsaw business.

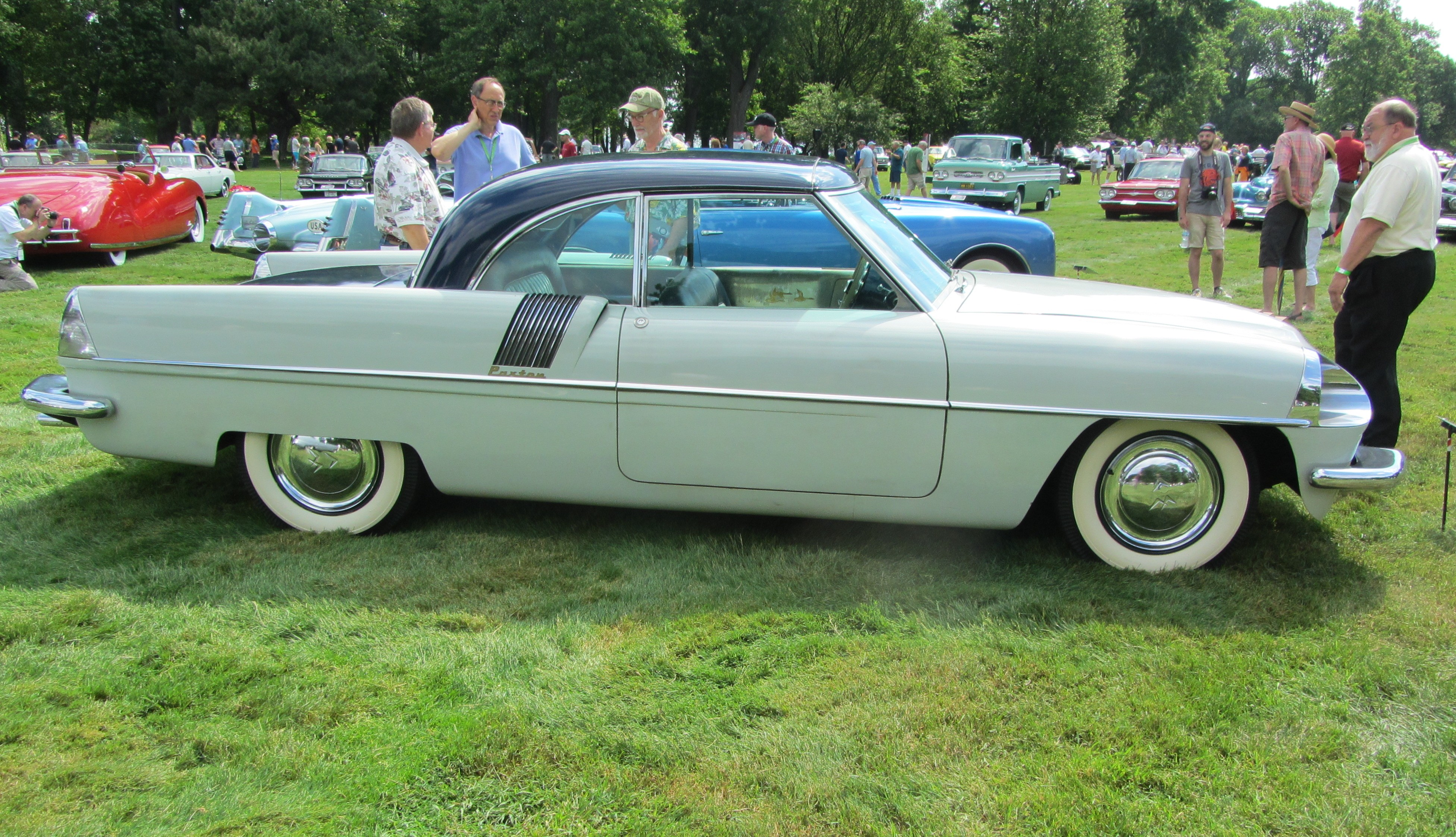
Paxton Phoenix side view

The car was styled by Brooks Stevens and featured a cable driven mechanical hardtop that retracted and covered the trunk. Engine options that were considered included an alternative fuel steam engine, based on earlier designs by Abner Doble, or a two-stroke gasoline engine with a McCulloch/Paxton supercharger. The prototype was powered by a Porsche 356 engine for demonstration purposes.

The Phoenix never went into production. The prototype was sold at the Paxton liquidation auction in Santa Monica, California in 1977. It remained in a private collection until mechanically restored in the early 1990s, retaining the factory paint, trim, and interior. It was then sold to the Brooks Stevens (museum) shortly before Stevens died. The Stevens family sold the car to a private collector in Ohio who regularly exhibits it as part of his collection of unusual and unique cars.
