= Lake Havasu High School =

Public high school in Mohave County, Arizona

Location
- 2675 Palo Verde Boulevard South; Lake Havasu City, Arizona 86403; United States; 34°29′40″N 114°18′55″W

Information
- School type: Public high school
- School district: Lake Havasu Unified School District
- CEEB code: 030183
- Principal: Amy Barney
- Teaching staff: 73.87 (FTE)
- Grades: 9–12
- Enrollment: 1,618 (2023–2024)
- Student to teacher ratio: 21.90
- Colors: Purple and gold
- Mascot: Knights
- Accreditation: Cognia
- Website: lhhs.lhusd.org

Lake Havasu High School is a high school in Lake Havasu City, Arizona under the jurisdiction of the Lake Havasu Unified School District. Its graduation rate is 86%.

The district, and therefore the high school's attendance boundary, includes Lake Havasu, Crystal Beach, and Desert Hills.

== Notable alumni ==
- Michael Biehn (1974), actor, known for playing Kyle Reese in The Terminator
- Bob Milacki, Major League Baseball player (Baltimore Orioles, Cleveland Indians, Kansas City Royals, Seattle Mariners)
