= Arizona State University Colleges at Lake Havasu City =

Extension campus

Coordinates: 34.473°N 114.321°W

Arizona State University at Lake Havasu City
- Type: Satellite campus
- Active: August 1, 2012–June 1, 2025
- Parent institution: Arizona State University
- President: Michael M. Crow
- Academic staff: 20
- Students: 285
- Location: Lake Havasu City, Arizona, United States
- Campus: Suburban
- Website: Official website

Arizona State University at Lake Havasu City (ASU at Lake Havasu) was a satellite campus of the Arizona State University in Lake Havasu City, Arizona. It opened in fall 2012 and focused on an experiential, student-centered approach to learning. The university closed the campus in June 2025 due to state budget cuts.

== History ==
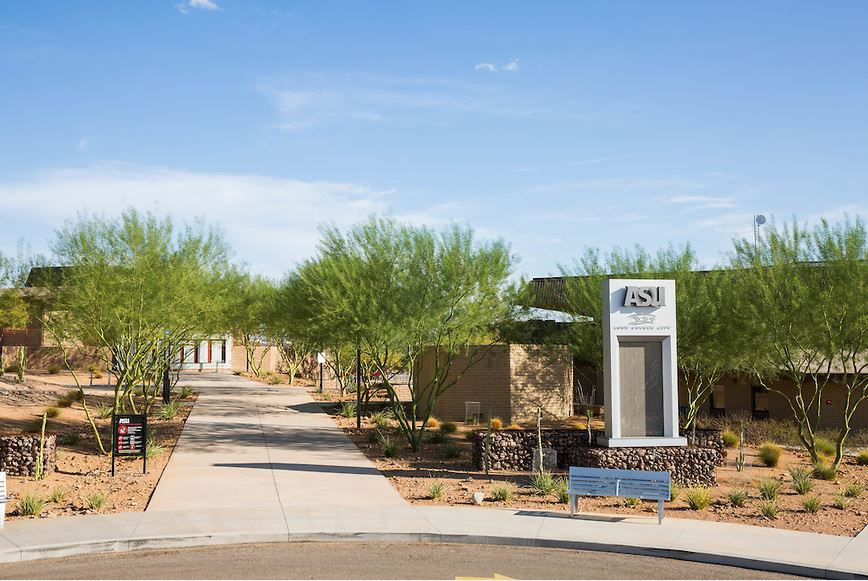
Entrance of ASU Havasu from University Way.

The "ASU Colleges" model was formulated in 2009 as an initiative to offer high quality, undergraduate degrees at lower costs. The Arizona Board of Regents, along with the presidents of each public Arizona university, were tasked with coming up with models of offering baccalaureate degrees to help prepare students for real world careers. In order for the idea to work, the city in which the college would be located would have to raise the funds for a physical location of the campus. Several locations throughout Arizona were highlighted, but the one city that pushed for the campus was Lake Havasu City. With support from local citizens, business owners, city officials, and non-profit organizations, $2 million was raised in an effort to renovate a previous middle school site for the ASU Havasu campus. The fundraising efforts were coordinated by the Havasu Foundation for Higher Education (HFHE), a 501(c)3 non-profit organization, that was started in 2004 by Dr. Bill Ullery. The HFHE was started as an initiative to highlight the importance of higher education in the Mohave County area. The HFHE continues to offer fundraising opportunities for campus projects and scholarships for new and current students.

In September 2024, ASU announced that the campus would close in June 2025 in response to state budget cuts.

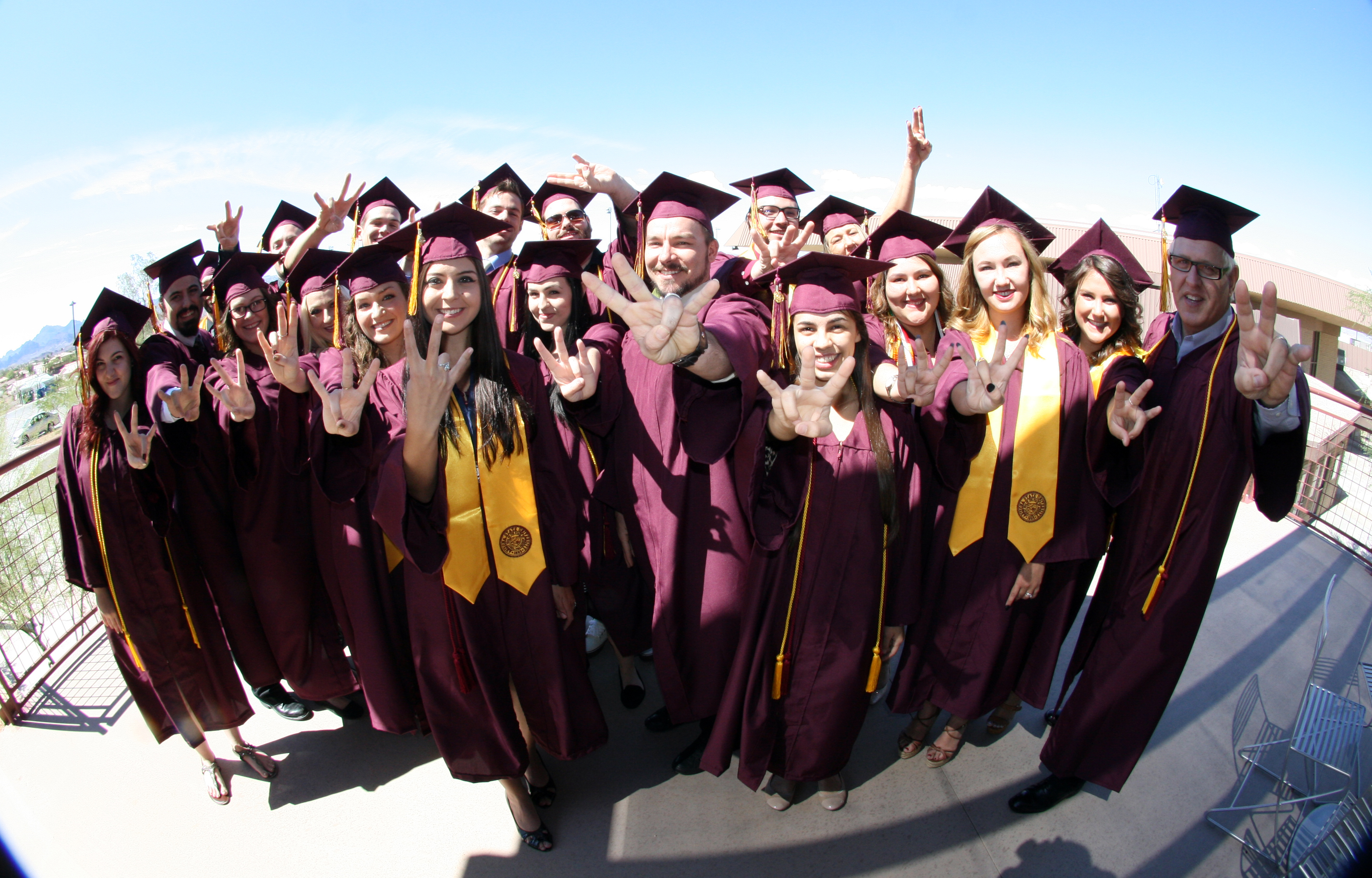
ASU Havasu Graduates from the Spring 2016 Convocation.

== Facilities ==
=== Residence Hall ===
In March 2015, ASU purchased the motel that sat on the Northwest corner of the lot where ASU at Lake Havasu is situated. As phase 1 of the project, the 20 outer rooms were gutted and renovated. For the first time since opening in fall of 2012, ASU Havasu had on-campus housing for the fall of 2015. Phase 2 of the residence hall project took place in the summer of 2016. 11 rooms in the middle building were renovated to accommodate for increasing enrollment in the fall of 2016. In 2020, ASU announced a $400,000 remodeling effort to increase the type and quality of housing.

=== Dedication Wall and Student Center Patio ===
A dedication wall sits in the center of the former campus. The wall commemorates the efforts of the Lake Havasu City community in raising $2 million to start the campus. Behind the wall rests the student center.

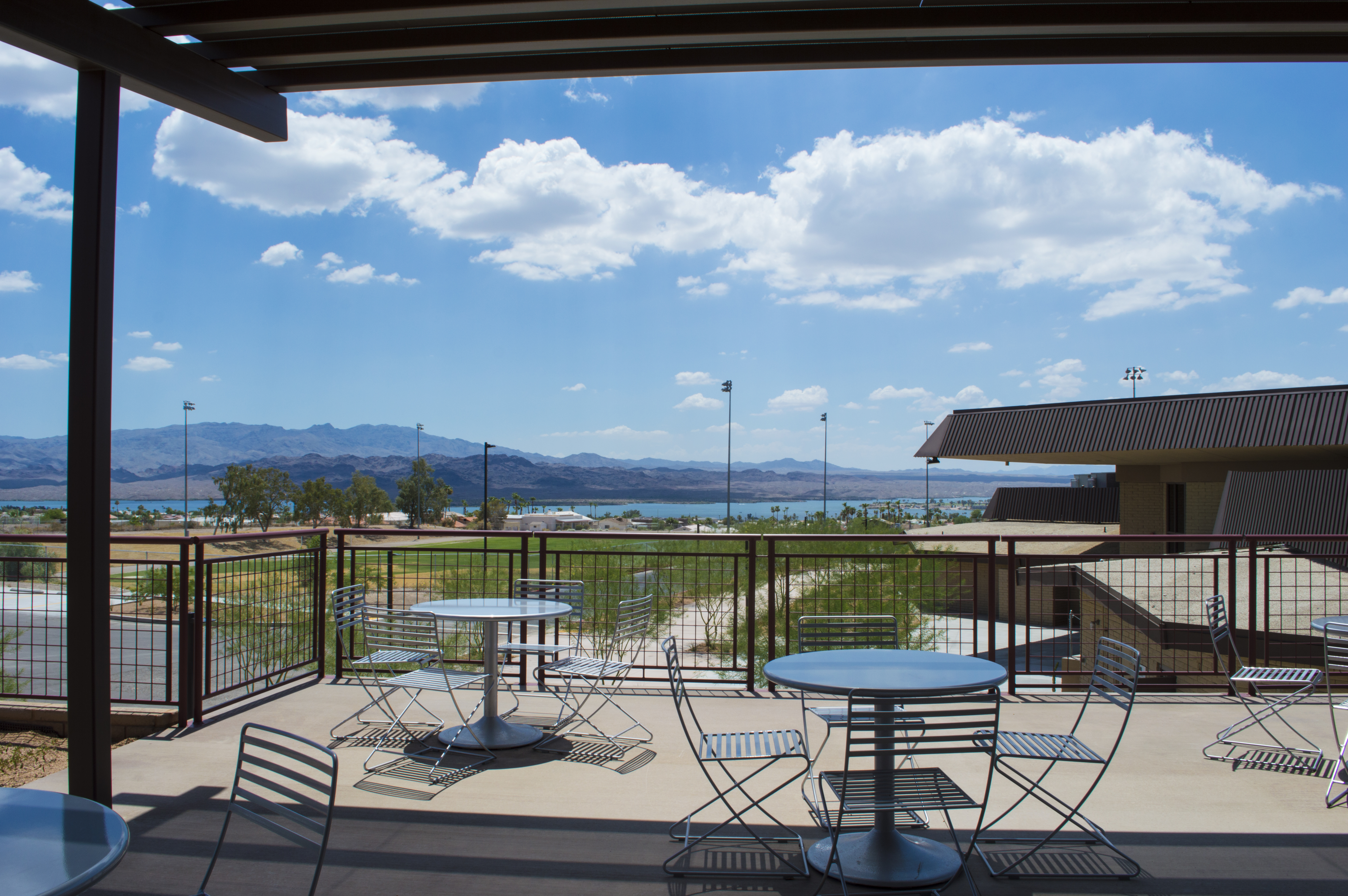
The view of Lake Havasu from the ASU Havasu Student Center Patio

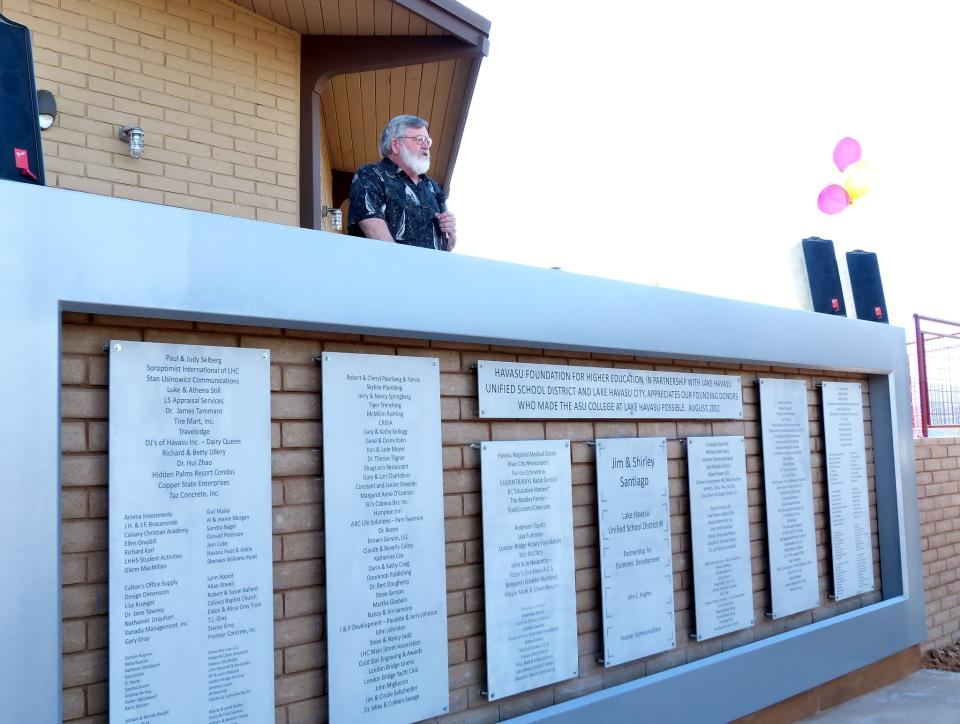
David Young, Campus Director, presenting the Dedication Wall in 2012
