= Lake Havasu City Airport =

Airport in Mohave County, Arizona

Coordinates: 34°34′16″N 114°21′30″W

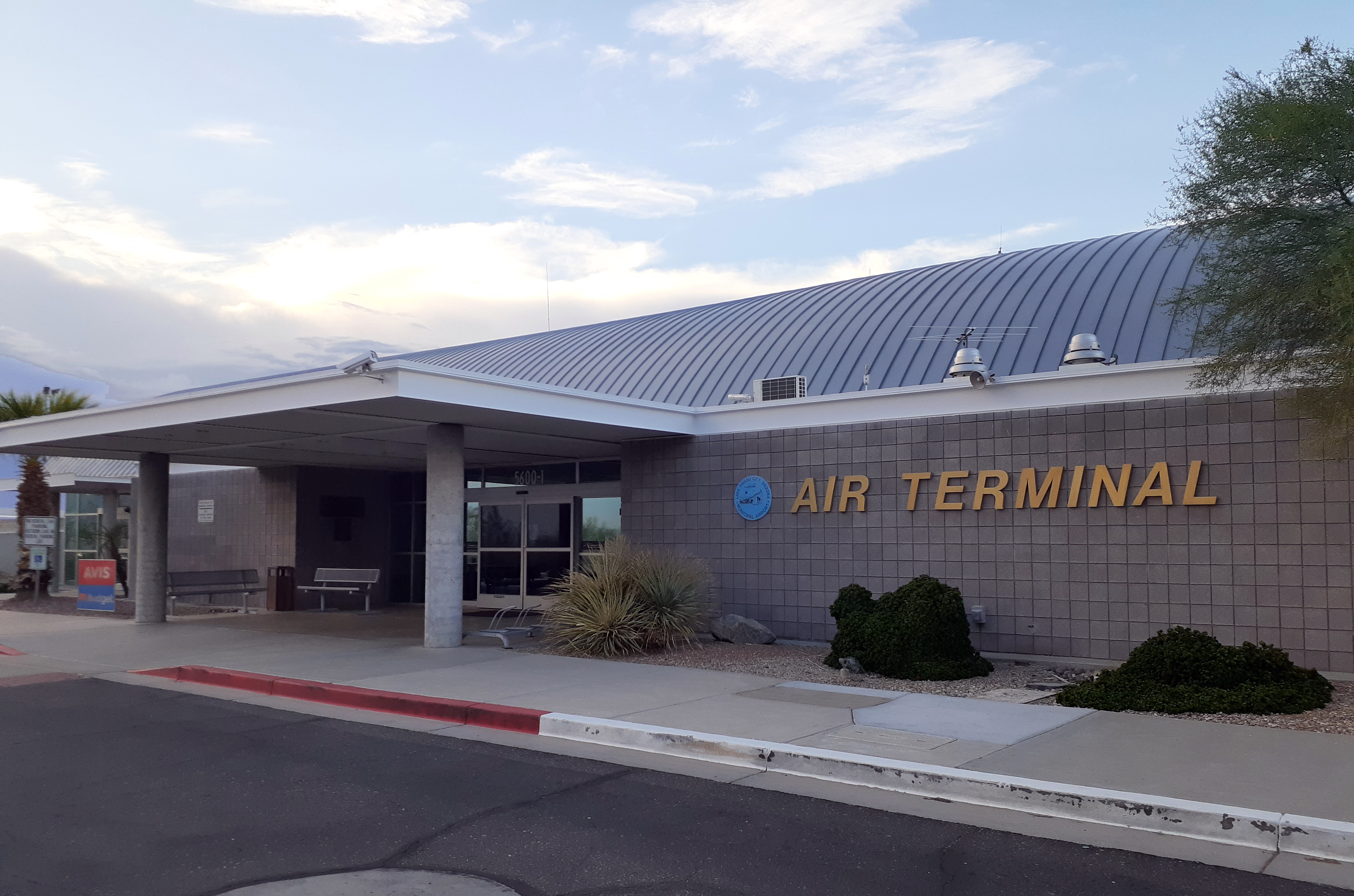
- IATA: HII; ICAO: KHII; FAA LID: HII

Summary
- Airport type: Public
- Owner: Lake Havasu City
- Serves: Lake Havasu City, Arizona
- Elevation AMSL: 783 ft / 239 m

Map

Runways
Direction	Length		Surface
Direction	ft	m	Surface
14/32	8,000	2,438	Asphalt

Statistics (2022)
- Aircraft operations (year ending May 16, 2022): 52,900
- Based aircraft: 157
- Source: Federal Aviation Administration

Lake Havasu City Airport (IATA: HII, ICAO: KHII, FAA LID: HII), also known as Lake Havasu City Municipal Airport, is a city-owned, public-use airport located 6 miles (5.2 nmi; 9.7 km) north of the central business district of Lake Havasu City, in Mohave County, Arizona, United States.

The airport is mostly used for general aviation. Until May 5, 2007, scheduled service to Phoenix and Las Vegas was provided by Mesa Airlines, operating as US Airways Express (previously America West Express).

As per Federal Aviation Administration records, the airport had 8,174 commercial passenger boardings (enplanements) in calendar year 2005 and 6,082 enplanements in 2006. According to the FAA's National Plan of Integrated Airport Systems for 2007–2011, Lake Havasu City Airport is classified as commercial service - non-primary because it has between 2,500 and 10,000 passenger boardings per year.

== Facilities and aircraft ==
Lake Havasu City Airport covers an area of 646 acres (261 ha) which contains one asphalt paved runway:

- 14/32 measuring 8,000 x 100 ft (2,438 x 30 m)

For the 12-month period ending May 16, 2022, the airport had 52,900 aircraft operations, an average of 145 per day: 92% general aviation, 4% air taxi and 4% military. There was 157 aircraft based at this airport: 121 single engine, 13 multi-engine, 7 jet aircraft, 7 helicopter and 9 ultralight.

=== Incidents and accidents ===
On April 23, 2018, an Air Force F-16 fighter jet crash landed while attempting an emergency landing during a routine training flight. The pilot ejected safely as the plane went off the end of the runway.

== Airline and destination ==
=== Cargo ===
Airlines	Destinations
Ameriflight	Phoenix

== See also ==
- List of airports in Arizona
