= McCulloch Motors Corporation =

American subsidiary manufacturer of chainsaws

- Industry: Power tools
- Founded: 1943; 83 years ago in Milwaukee, Wisconsin, United States
- Founder: Robert P. McCulloch
- Headquarters: Tucson, Arizona, U.S.
- Products: Chainsaws, String trimmers
- Parent: Husqvarna Group
- Website: mcculloch.com

McCulloch Motors Corporation is an American manufacturer of chainsaws and other outdoor power tools. The company was founded in Milwaukee, Wisconsin, in 1943 by Robert Paxton McCulloch as a manufacturer of small two-stroke gasoline engines and introduced its first chainsaw in 1948, the Model 5-49. McCulloch and its brand are owned by Husqvarna.

== History ==
Previous logo

McCulloch moved its operation to California in 1946. In the 1950s, McCulloch manufactured target drone engines, which were sold to RadioPlane in the 1970s. These McCulloch 4318 small four cylinder horizontally opposed two-stroke engines were also popular for use in various small autogyros, such as the Bensen B-8M and Wallis WA-116.

McCulloch also started Paxton Automotive, manufacturing McCulloch-labeled superchargers like the one fitted to the Kaiser Manhattan, the 1957 Studebaker Golden Hawk, and Ford Thunderbird.

In 1959, they produced their first kart engine, the McCulloch MC-10, an adapted chainsaw two-stroke engine. Bill Van Tichelt of VanTech Engineering designed and produced one of the first specialized and most successful intake manifolds for the McCulloch kart engine, along with mufflers, conversion kits, throttle linkages, air stacks and bottom slopers.

=== Lake Havasu City ===
In 1964, McCulloch founded Lake Havasu City, Arizona, with a factory and housing for its workers. Company founder Robert McCulloch was involved in buying the London Bridge at auction in the 1960s. It was then reassembled in Lake Havasu City and opened in 1971.

=== Product lines ===
In 1967, McCulloch discontinued its line of outboard boat engines which it began after the 1956 purchase of outboard maker Scott-Atwater Manufacturing Company of Minneapolis, Minnesota.

In the 1970s their range was expanded to add generators, hedge trimmers, string trimmers, and leaf blowers, but started a narrow focus on lawn and garden equipment.

=== Corporate changes ===
In July 1973 Black and Decker announced it was negotiating the purchase of McCulloch. The U.S. Department of Justice filed an antitrust suit on September 28 of that year, seeking to block the acquisition. Notwithstanding the outstanding action, Black and Decker acquired McCulloch for 550,000 shares of the former's stock on October 1. While the suit was ongoing, Black and Decker agreed to maintain McCulloch as a separate, identifiable business entity. The case was ultimately decided in favor of Black and Decker in August 1976.

While initially profitable for Black and Decker because of the 1970s energy crisis that caused a significant increase in the use of wood-burning stoves, the end of the crisis, coupled with increasing competition from Japanese and European manufacturers, precipitated a sharp reversal. With McCulloch becoming a severe financial drain to its parent company, Black and Decker began exploring a sale in October 1982. In March 1983, Black and Decker agreed to sell McCulloch to a group of investors led by McCulloch president Donald V. Marchese.

In January 1999, the company filed for Chapter 11 bankruptcy and sold its European division to Husqvarna AB. In October 1999, its North American operation was acquired by the Taiwanese company Jenn Feng Industrial Co. Jenn Feng added electric power tools and pressure washers to the product line.

In March 2003, MTD Products signed a distribution and licensing agreement with Jenn Feng in which MTD would exclusively produce McCulloch products in North America.

In March 2008, Husqvarna acquired the outdoor products division of Jenn Feng, gaining access to the McCulloch brand in the North American market. McCulloch is since a brand within the Husqvarna Group.

== Related companies ==
- McCulloch Aircraft Corporation
- McCulloch Oil Corporation
- Paxton Automotive
- Scott-Atwater Manufacturing Company
