= London Bridge (Lake Havasu City) =

Bridge in Lake Havasu City, Arizona

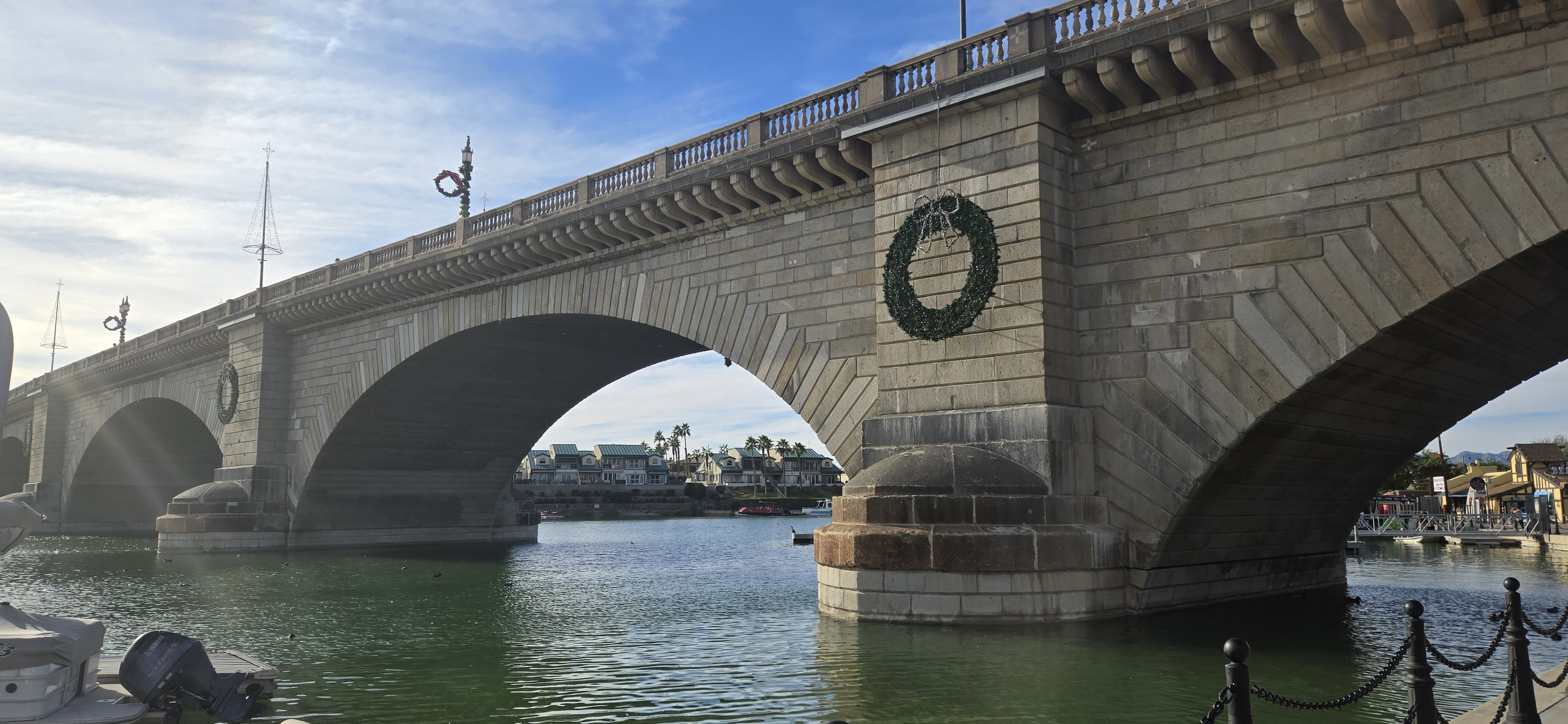
- London Bridge in Lake Havasu City (November 2025)
- Coordinates: 34°28′18″N 114°20′50″W
- Carries: McCulloch Boulevard North
- Crosses: Bridgewater Channel Canal
- Locale: Lake Havasu City, Arizona, United States

Characteristics
- Design: Arch bridge
- Material: Clynelish (Brora) sandstone and various granite mixes
- Total length: 930 feet (280 m; 167 sm)
- Longest span: 45.6 metres (150 ft)
- No. of spans: 5

History
- Designer: John Rennie
- Construction start: 1825
- Construction end: 1831
- Opened: August 1, 1831 (London); October 10, 1971 (Lake Havasu)
- Rebuilt: 1967–1971

Location
- Interactive map of London Bridge

London Bridge is a bridge in Lake Havasu City, Arizona, United States. When it was built in the 1830s, it spanned the River Thames in London, England. In 1968, the bridge was purchased from the City of London by Robert P. McCulloch. However, McCulloch only had the exterior granite blocks from the original bridge cut and transported to the United States for use in the construction of a new bridge in Lake Havasu City, a planned community he established in 1964 on the shore of Lake Havasu. The only parts of the “New London Bridge” that made it to Arizona were the exterior masonry. The Arizona bridge is a reinforced concrete structure clad in the original masonry of the 1830s bridge. The bridge was completed in 1971 (along with the Bridgewater Channel Canal, separating the peninsula from the mainland), and links mainland Lake Havasu City with Pittsburgh Point. The "rededication" of London Bridge took place on October 10, 1971.

== History ==
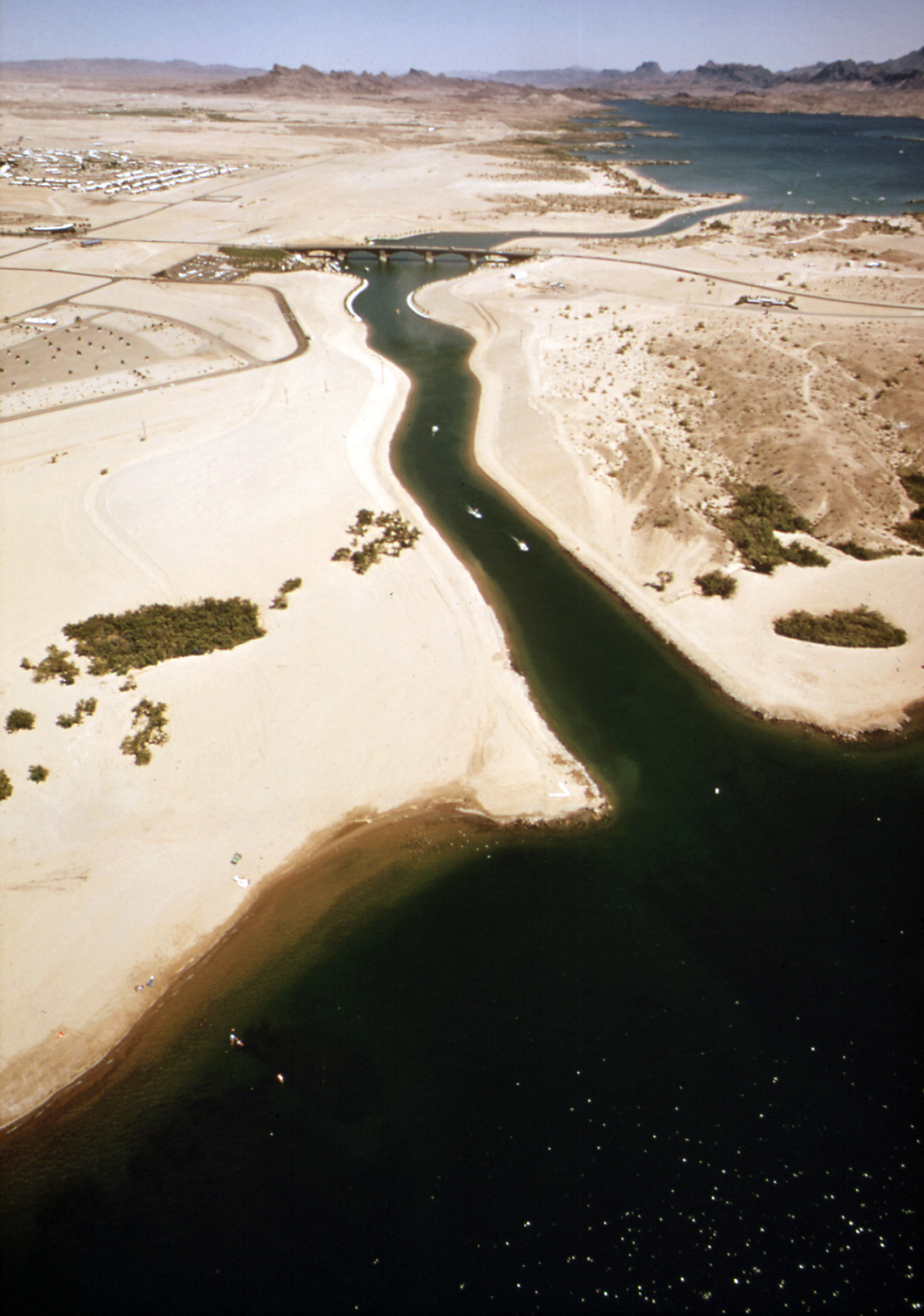
After the London Bridge in Arizona was completed in 1971, a new navigable canal turned the Pittsburgh Point peninsula into an island as seen in this 1972 photo.

The 1831 London Bridge was the last project of engineer John Rennie, and was completed by his son, John Rennie. By 1962, it was not sturdy enough to carry the increased load of traffic; the bridge was sold by the City of London in April 1968 to make way for its replacement.

The purchaser, Robert P. McCulloch, was an entrepreneur and real estate developer who founded Lake Havasu City. He installed the bridge to attract tourists and retirement home buyers to his properties there.

=== Purchase and transfer to Arizona ===
The community first started as an Army Air Corps rest camp, called "Site Six" during World War II on the shores of Lake Havasu. In 1958 McCulloch purchased 3,353 acres (13.57 km^{2}) of property on the east side of the lake along Pittsburgh Point, the peninsula, intending to develop the land. But the real estate agents could not bring in prospective buyers, because the land was far from centers of population and had a very hot, arid climate. McCulloch's real estate agent, Robert Plumer, learned that London Bridge was for sale and convinced McCulloch to buy it and bring it to the area to attract potential land buyers. The initial response from McCulloch was, "That's the craziest idea I have ever heard," but after consideration, he decided to go ahead and purchased it for £1.02 million ($2.46 million at that time).

There is a popular rumor that the bridge was bought in the mistaken belief that it was London's more recognizable Tower Bridge, but the allegation was vehemently denied by both McCulloch and Ivan Luckin, who arranged the bridge's sale.

The bridge's facing stones were removed, with each numbered and its position catalogued. After the bridge was dismantled, the stones were transported to a quarry in Merrivale, Devon, where 15 to 20 cm (6 to 8 inches) were sliced off many of the original stones.

Plumer arranged with a cargo shipping company that was going to sail a newly built ship, without any cargo, from the UK to the US. Plumer negotiated to pay for all the voyage's operating costs, in return for carrying the bridge stones as cargo to the US, which was far less than the going rate shipping costs.

The new ship transported the bridge in pieces through the Panama Canal and unloaded it at the Port of Long Beach, California. From there, the bridge was transported overland to Lake Havasu City, where re-assembly began in 1968.

=== Reconstruction in Lake Havasu ===
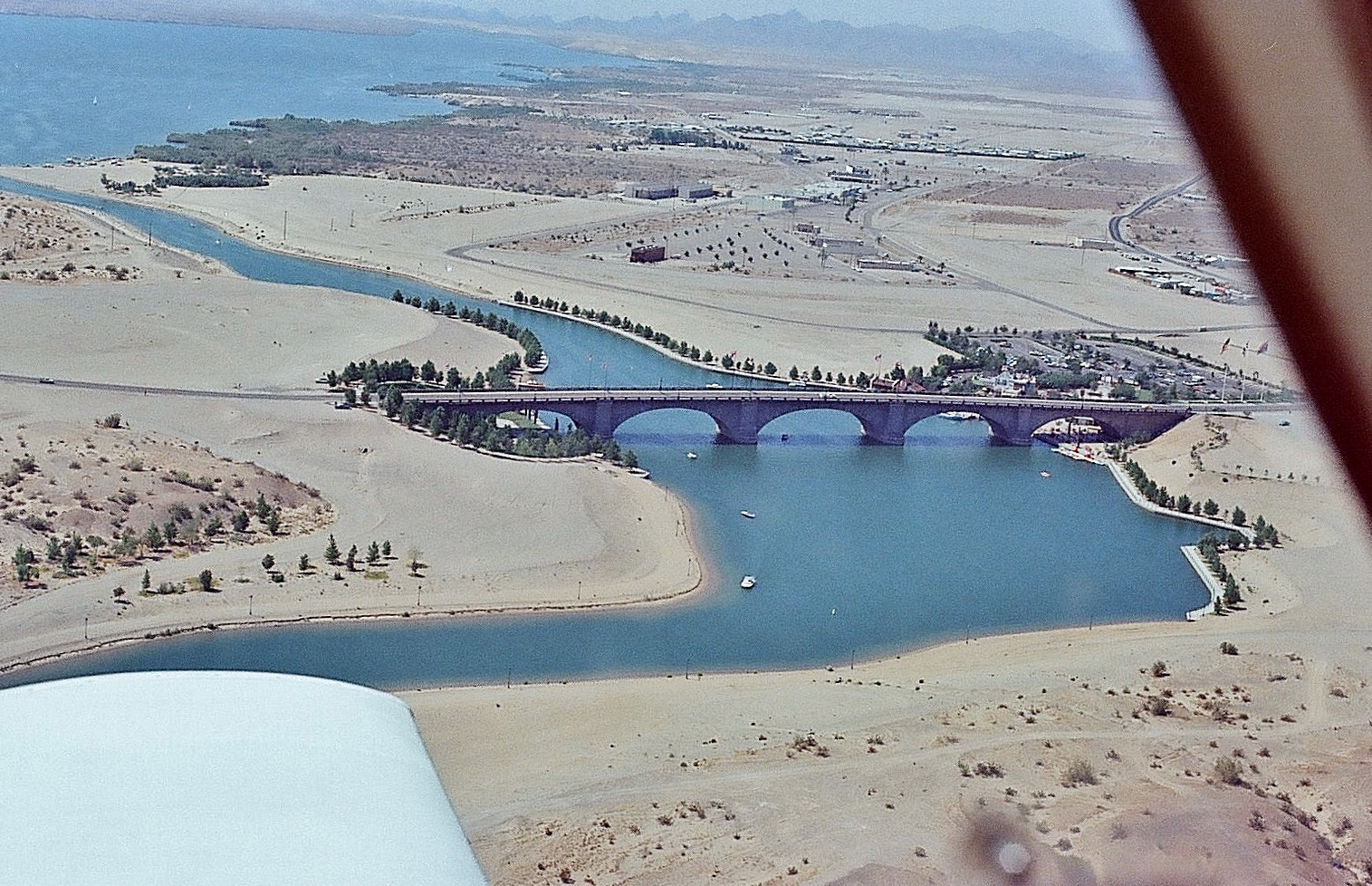
London Bridge in Arizona, 1973

On September 23, 1968, the bridge's foundation stone was re-laid at the reconstruction site in Arizona by Sir Gilbert Inglefield, Lord Mayor of London. A new concrete interior structure was clad in the original stonework. The reconstruction took slightly over three years and was completed in late 1971 by Sundt Construction.

The bridge was not rebuilt over a river, but was put up on land between the main part of the city and Pittsburgh Point, which at that time was a peninsula jutting into Lake Havasu. Once completed, a construction company dredged the Bridgewater Channel Canal under the bridge, across the neck of the Pittsburgh Point peninsula. The canal separating it from the city made Pittsburgh Point an island. As a result, the bridge now traverses a navigable shortcut between the Thompson Bay in Lake Havasu, south of Pittsburgh Point, and the northern part of Lake Havasu.

=== Use as a tourist attraction ===
After the bridge was reconstructed, prospective buyers of land were attracted to visit the bridge and take a tour of properties for sale. Land sales improved, and McCulloch recouped all his expenses on the purchase and shipping of the bridge. Since he had obtained the land at no cost, the sale of the properties paid for the bridge and more. Recent years have seen much development in the area of the bridge to increase tourist interest.

The original "English Village" was an open-air mall with a hedge maze and historical museum built in faux-English style. It deteriorated over time and sections of the mall were leveled. The Lake Havasu City Convention & Visitors Bureau has undertaken a revitalization of the English Village, with conversion of the mall to condos proposed in 2011 by Virtual Realty Enterprises, its current owner.

On June 16, 2014, The Sun published a false story claiming the bridge was being torn down to build an attraction for selling marijuana and drug paraphernalia to tourists. Doug Traub, President & CEO of the Lake Havasu City Convention & Visitors Bureau (now Go Lake Havasu) responded by demanding a retraction. The conflict was picked up by publications around the globe. After two weeks, the British tabloid removed the story from circulation and printed a correction.

== In popular culture ==
- The 1972 musical variety television special The Special London Bridge Special with Tom Jones and Jennifer O'Neill was shot in Lake Havasu City to celebrate the London Bridge.
- The 1983 American psychological thriller Olivia used the relocation of the bridge as a central plot device.
- The 1985 made-for-TV movie Bridge Across Time, a supernatural crime drama, used the relocation of the bridge as a plot device. In the film, the spirit of Jack the Ripper was somehow transported to 1980s Arizona along with a stone from London Bridge, resulting in a murder spree.
- The 1987 made-for-TV movie The Return of Sherlock Holmes has Holmes, lost in the Arizona desert, come upon London Bridge, believing he has stumbled into a heavenly facsimile of London.
- The bridge is featured in Guns, a 1990 film written and directed by Andy Sidaris.
- The London Bridge is featured in the 1987 film Million Dollar Mystery.
- The 1993 movie Falling Down has Robert Duvall's character, a detective tracking Michael Douglas through Los Angeles, planning to move to Lake Havasu City with his wife when he retires.
- The paranormal television series Ghost Adventures covered the story of the London Bridge, in the episode "London Bridge".
- In the song "London Homesick Blues" by Gary P. Nunn, a reference is made with the line "Even London Bridge has fallen down and moved to Arizona". This song was the theme song for Austin City Limits television show from 1977 to 2004.
- On May 8, 2010, Lake Havasu City’s Doug Traub arranged for magician and escape artist Criss Angel to film an episode from the London Bridge for his A & E Network TV series Mindfreak while bound in chains, locked in a cage with his feet encased in cement, and lowered underwater into the Channel from a construction crane.
- The song "London Bridge" by Bread in 1969 makes specific reference to the bridge's removal ("London bridge is finally fallin' down, They packed it up and shipped it outta town . . . ").
- The bridge is featured in American Truck Simulator game as a part of newly added Lake Havasu City since ver. 1.58 (released in Feb. 2026)

== Image gallery ==
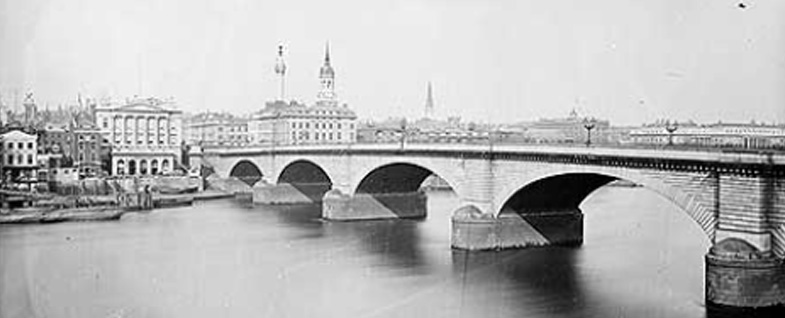
London Bridge in about 1870 when it crossed the River Thames in London

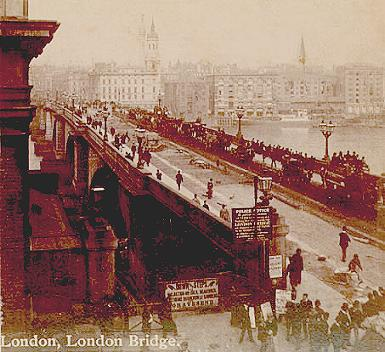
London Bridge in the early 1890s

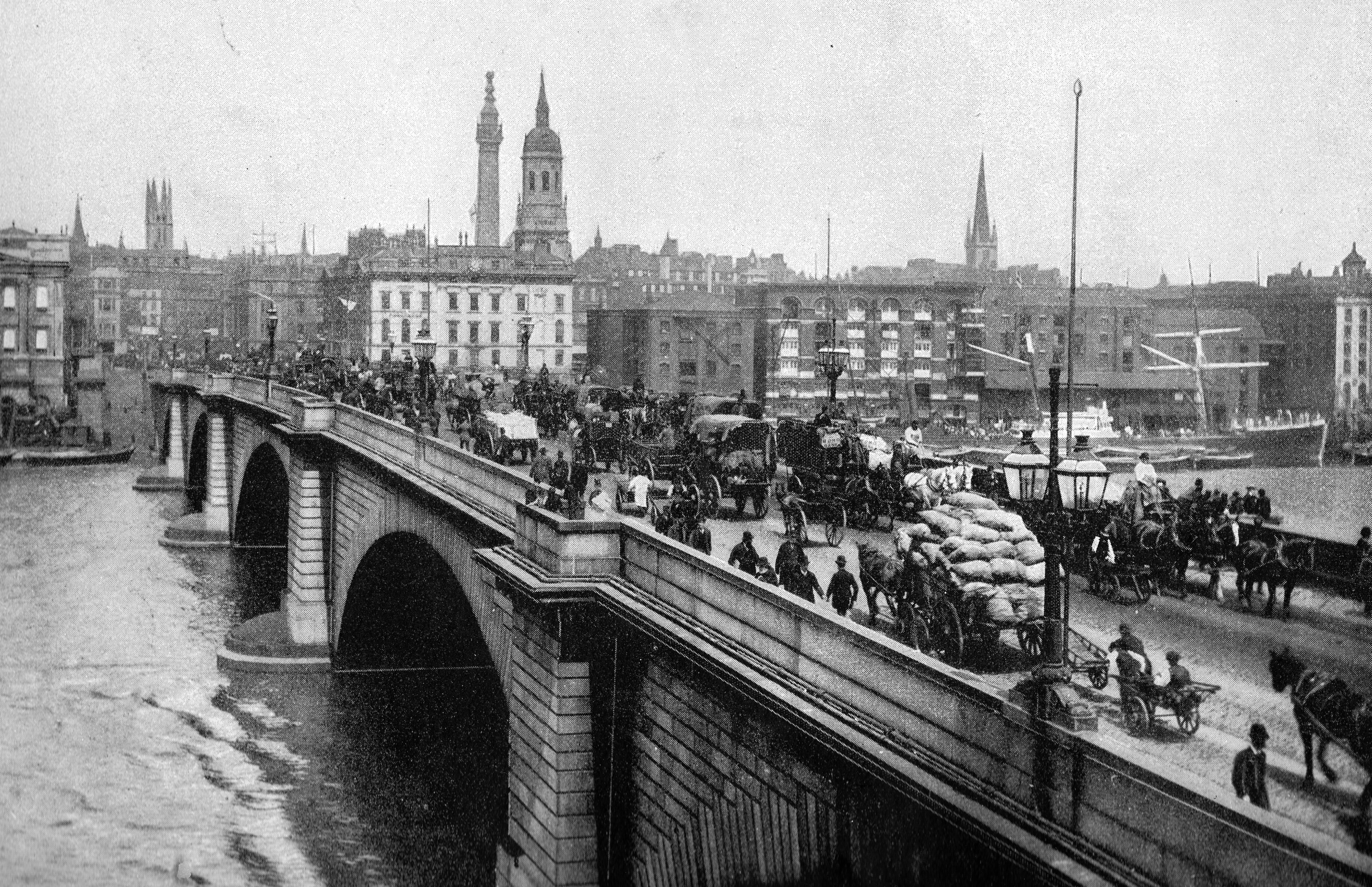
London Bridge around 1900 with traffic

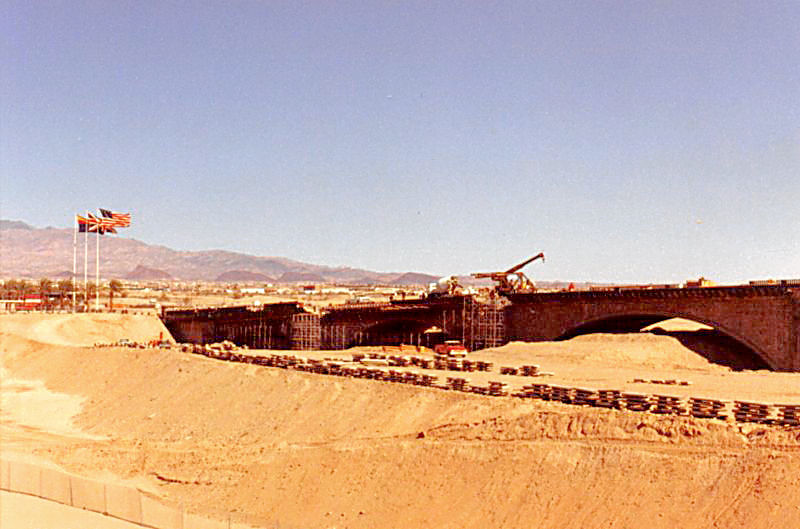
Bridge reconstruction at Lake Havasu in March 1971

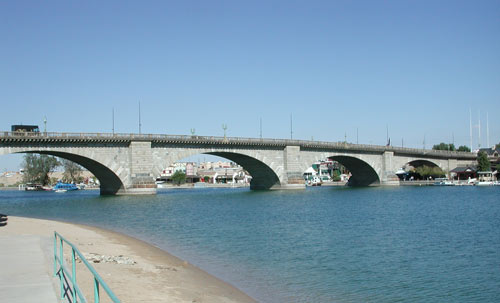
The rebuilt London Bridge in 2003

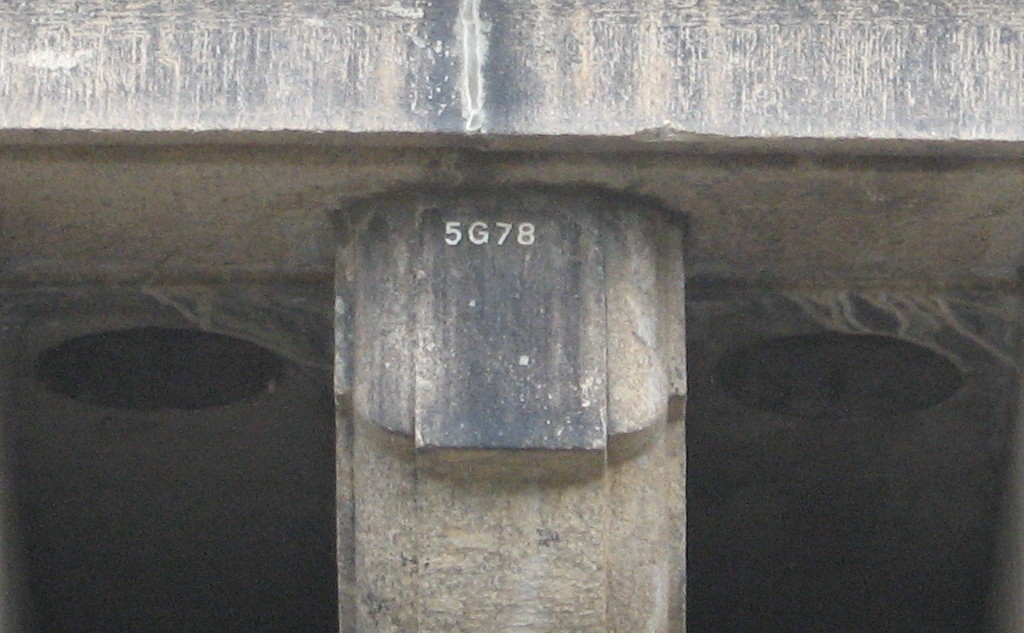
Labelled stone still visible (2007)

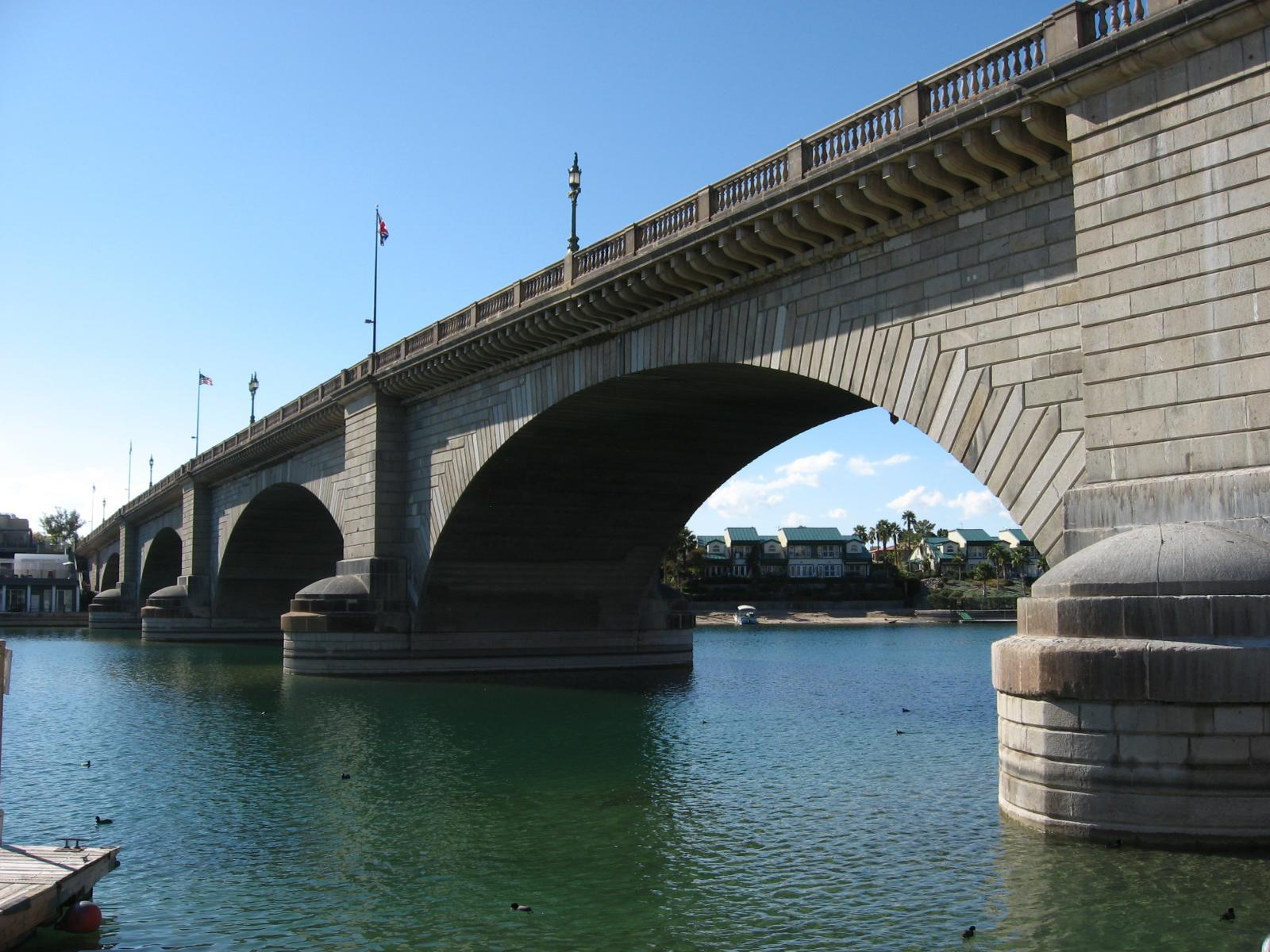
London Bridge in 2009

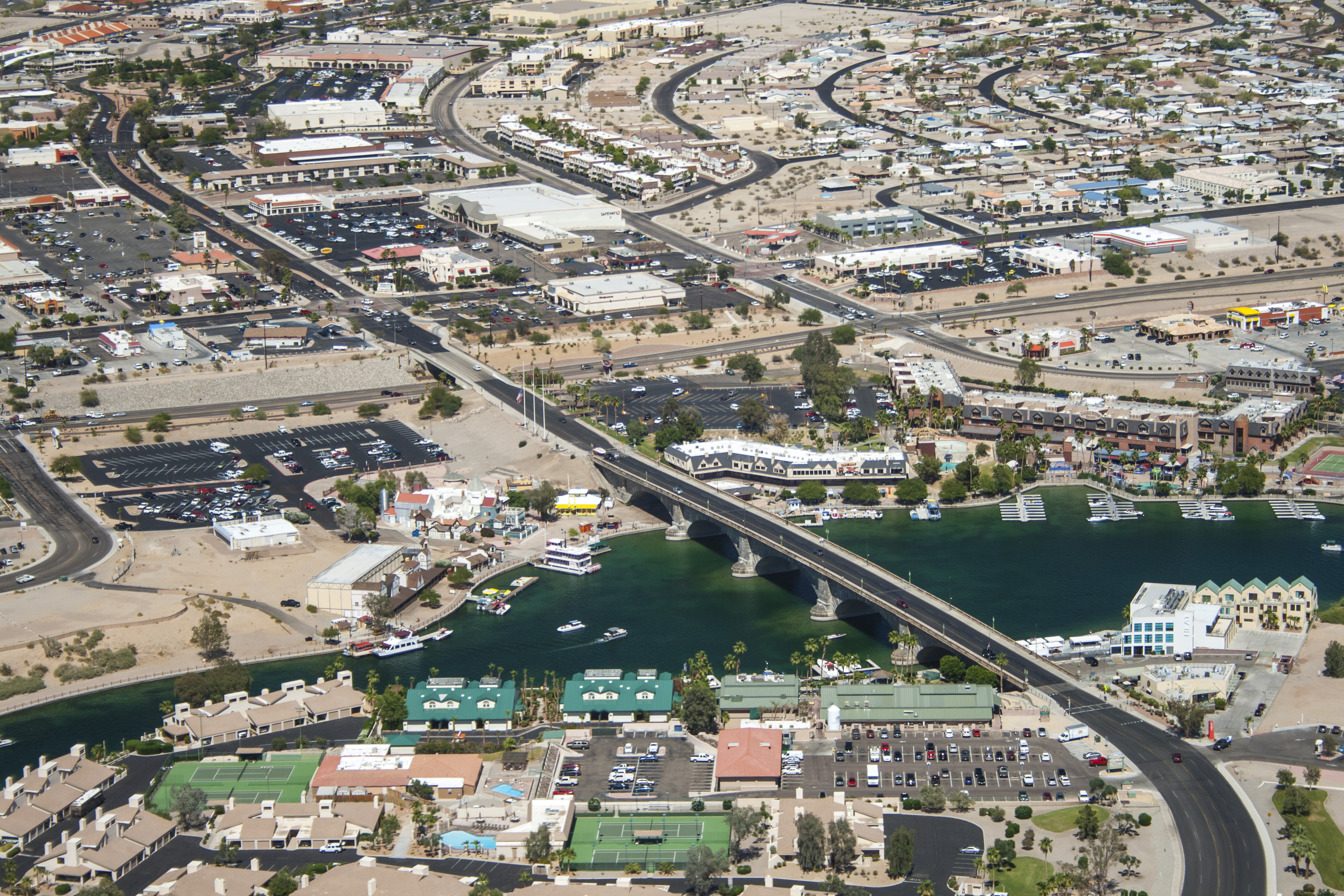
Aerial photo of the bridge in 2011

== See also ==
- List of bridges documented by the Historic American Engineering Record in Arizona
