= Lake Havasu City, Arizona =

City in Mohave County, Arizona

- City
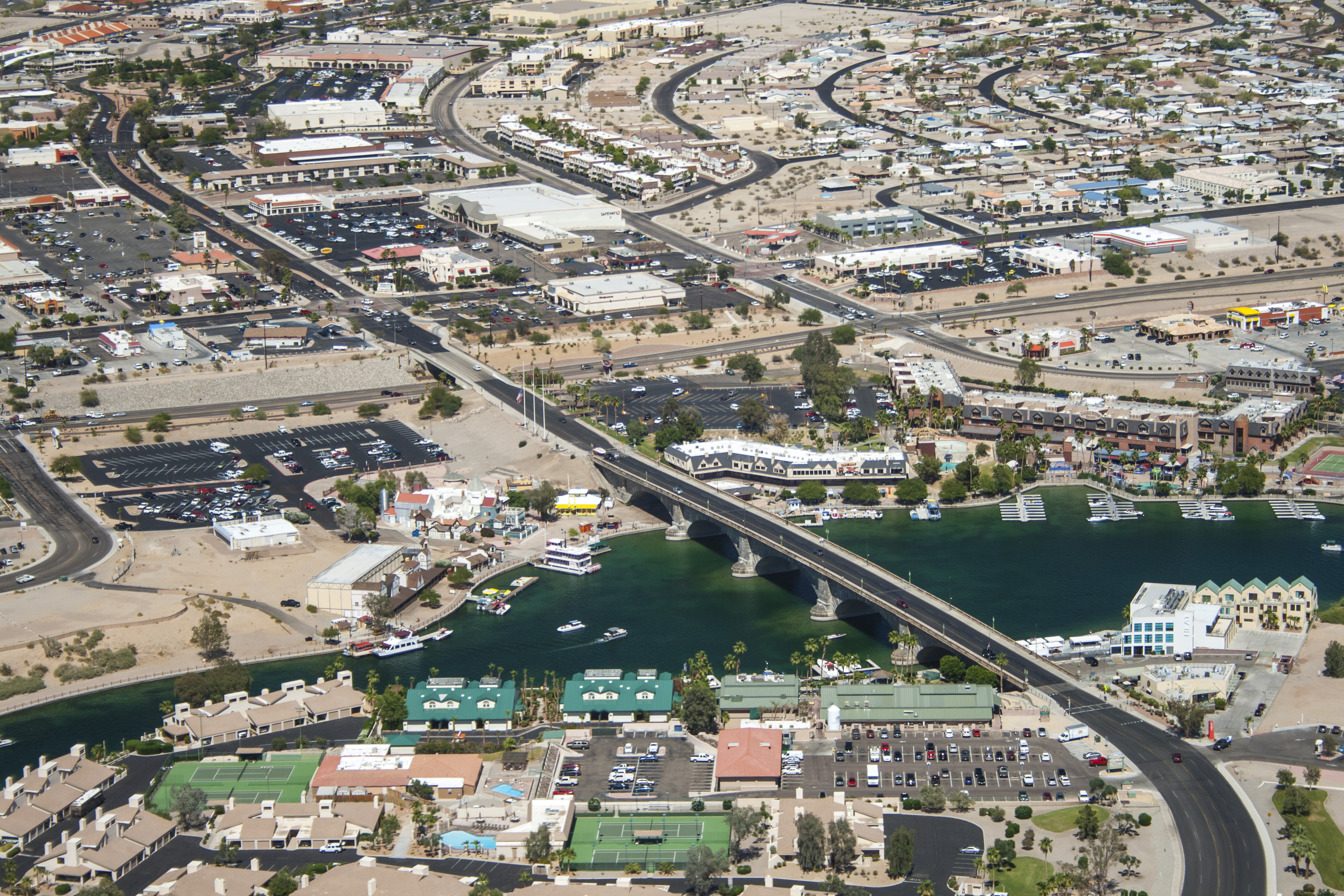
- London Bridge, Lake Havasu City

- Flag
- Nickname: "LHC"
- Interactive map of Lake Havasu City, Arizona
- Location within Arizona
- Coordinates: 34.4998°N 114.3109°W
- Country: United States
- State: Arizona
- County: Mohave
- Established: September 30, 1963
- Incorporated: 1978
- Named for: Lake Havasu

Government
  - Type: Mayor–council
  - Mayor: Cal Sheehy
  - Vice mayor: David Diaz
  - Councilmembers: Cameron Moses; Jeni Coke; Jim Dolan; Michele Lin; Nancy Campbell

Area
  - City: 46.385 sq mi (120.137 km^{2})
  - Land: 46.339 sq mi (120.017 km^{2})
  - Water: 0.046 sq mi (0.119 km^{2}) 0.10%
- Elevation: 938 ft (286 m)

Population (2020)
  - City: 57,144
  - Estimate (2025): 59,358
  - Rank: US: 687th AZ: 20th
  - Density: 1,233.2/sq mi (476.13/km^{2})
  - Urban: 59,017 (US: 458th)
  - Metro: 228,102 (US: 212nd)
- Time zone: UTC–7 (Mountain (MST))
- ZIP Codes: 86403, 86404, 86405, 86406
- Area code: 928
- FIPS code: 04-39370
- GNIS feature ID: 2411604
- Highway: SR 95
- Website: lhcaz.gov

Lake Havasu City (/ˈhɑːvəsuː/, HAH-və-soo) is a city in Mohave County, Arizona, United States. The population was 57,144 as of the 2020 census, and was estimated at 59,358 in 2025. It is served by Lake Havasu City Airport.

== History ==
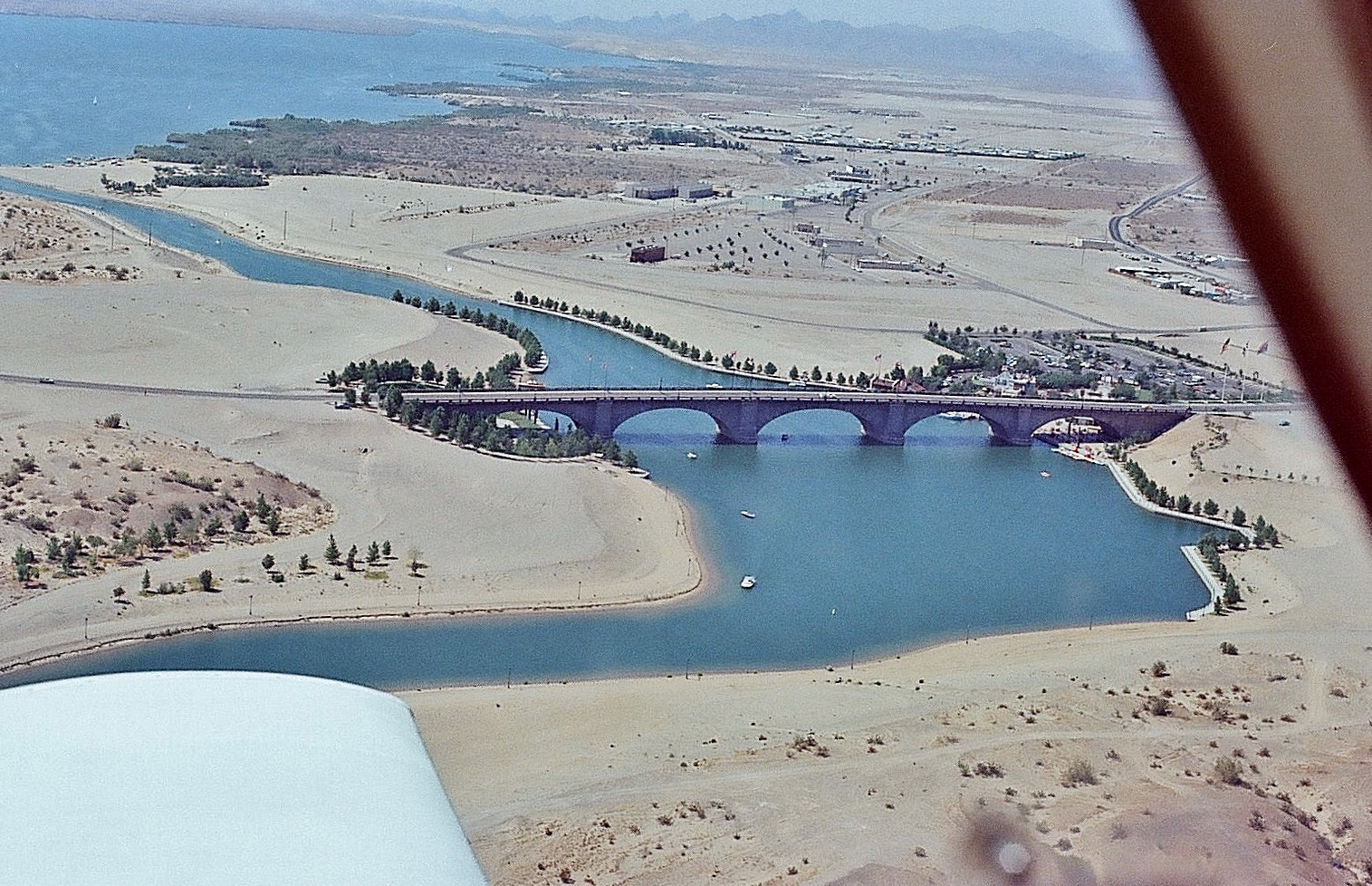
Lake Havasu City in 1973

Lake Havasu City was established on September 30, 1963 and was incorporated in 1978.

The community first started during World War II as Site Six, an Army Air Corps rest camp on the shores of Lake Havasu. In 1958, American businessman Robert P. McCulloch purchased 3,353 acres (13.57 km^{2}) of property on the east side of the lake along Pittsburgh Point, a peninsula that would eventually be transformed into an island.

After four years of planning, McCulloch Properties acquired another 13,000 acres (53 km^{2}) of federal land in the surrounding area. Lake Havasu City was established on September 30, 1963, by a resolution of the Mohave County Board of Supervisors, as the Lake Havasu Irrigation and Drainage District, making it a legal entity (the act is referenced in resolution #63-12-1).

McCulloch Properties flew in prospective residents from around the United States for free in what became a substantial air operation. To qualify, prospective customers were required to put down a fully refundable deposit. McCulloch Properties acquired over a half-dozen commercial aircraft and in 1970, bought a small charter carrier, converting the operation into its own certificated airline, McCulloch International Airlines. From 1964 through 1978, 2,702 flights were made to Lake Havasu City bringing in prospective buyers.

=== London Bridge ===
London Bridge crosses the narrow Bridgewater Channel that leads from Lake Havasu (a segment of the Colorado River) to Thompson Bay (also on the river). Hoping to attract tourists and prospective buyers of residential lots, McCulloch bought it for US$2.5 million from the City of London, England, when the bridge was replaced in 1968. The bridge was disassembled on contract with Sundt Construction of Tucson, and the marked stones were shipped to Lake Havasu City and reassembled by Sundt for another US$7 million. The construction took three years to complete.

McCulloch gave an acre of land in Lake Havasu City to London. When Lake Havasu City wanted to use this land for a visitors' center, London leased it back for a quit rent of a Hopi Kachina figure.

Since its inauguration on October 5, 1971, London Bridge has become the second-largest tourist attraction in Arizona, after the Grand Canyon.

=== Events ===
Lake Havasu City is an active event destination for a wide range of people. During spring months, the community is joined by university students for spring break. In 1995, Lake Havasu City was featured during MTV's Spring Break coverage. Attendance during Spring Break has taken a downturn in recent years, as the city has declined to issue permits to the large party organizers.

For boaters, March to September are the prime months on Lake Havasu. The city is also home to the International World Jet Ski Final Races, multiple professional fishing tournaments, custom boat regattas, the Western Winter Blast pyrotechnics convention, Havasu 95 Speedway, the Chilln-n-Swilln Beer Festival annual charity event, the Havasu Triathlon, and the Havasu Balloon Festival & Fair.

During the winter months, the community is joined by retirees from colder regions of the country and Canada. During this period, multiple events are held on McCulloch Boulevard. Typically during the second weekend of February, McCulloch Boulevard is home to Winterfest, an annual event which draws thousands of visitors and residents for two days of food, activities, entertainment, and products from over 200 vendors from across the United States.

== Geography ==
Lake Havasu City is located in southwestern Mohave County on the east side of Lake Havasu, a reservoir on the Colorado River. It is 60 miles (97 km) south of Kingman, the Mohave county seat, and 193 miles (311 km) northwest of Phoenix.

According to the United States Census Bureau, the city has an area of 46.385 square miles (120.14 km^{2}), of which 46.339 square miles (120.02 km^{2}) is land and 0.046 square miles (0.12 km^{2}) (0.10%) is water.

== Transportation ==
The only surface access to Lake Havasu City is by road via Arizona State Route 95, which meets Interstate 40 19 miles (31 km) to the north of the city and Interstate 10 74 miles (119 km) to the south. C. V. Wood, who designed Disneyland, was hired by Robert McCulloch to lay out Lake Havasu's unique road system.

In the early stages of development of the city, McCulloch Properties operated a fleet of secondhand airliners such as the Lockheed Constellation and the Lockheed L-188 Electra to fly prospective property purchasers to the area from California and elsewhere in the United States.

The city operates Lake Havasu City Transit. Vegas Airporter provides service from Lake Havasu City to Harry Reid International Airport in Las Vegas. Havasu Landing Resort and Casino provides a ferry to Havasu Lake, California.

Lake Havasu City Airport, also known as Lake Havasu City Municipal Airport, is a general aviation airport owned by the city and located 6 miles north of the central business district of Lake Havasu City.

== Climate ==
Lake Havasu City has a hot arid climate (Köppen BWh), with sweltering summers, mild to warm winters, and very little rainfall. Lake Havasu City is a very hot city, even by Arizona standards; the hottest temperature ever recorded in the state, 128 °F or 53.3 °C, was recorded in Havasu City on June 29, 1994. Temperatures may exceed 100 °F or 37.8 °C as early as April or as late as October, while it routinely reaches 110 °F or 43.3 °C in the summer months and can even get up to 120 °F (48.9 °C) or higher during the worst heat waves. Overnight low temperatures generally stay between 80 and 90 °F (26.7 and 32.2 °C) for July and August, but the highest overnight low temperature (record high minimum) ever recorded was 98 °F or 36.7 °C on July 22, 2003.

The winters, on the other hand, are very pleasant, with typical daily highs in the 60s and 70s Fahrenheit (16–26 °C), and infrequent night frosts. Mean annual rainfall is only 4.16 inches (106 millimeters); winter is the wettest season, but even then, rain occurs on an average of only 2–3 days per month. The wettest "rain year" on record was from July 1977 to June 1978 with 8.46 inches or 214.9 millimeters and the driest from July 1995 to June 1996 with a mere 0.39 inches or 9.9 millimeters. The wettest month since records began in 1967 has been March 2020 with 2.99 inches or 75.9 millimeters, and the wettest day was October 21, 1978, when 1.87 inches or 47.5 millimeters fell over the 24 hours.

Climate data for Lake Havasu City, Arizona (1991–2020 normals, extremes 1967–present)
Month	Jan	Feb	Mar	Apr	May	Jun	Jul	Aug	Sep	Oct	Nov	Dec	Year
Record high °F (°C)	86 (30)	92 (33)	103 (39)	107 (42)	117 (47)	128 (53)	126 (52)	123 (51)	118 (48)	113 (45)	95 (35)	84 (29)	128 (53)
Mean maximum °F (°C)	75.0 (23.9)	81.4 (27.4)	91.8 (33.2)	101.4 (38.6)	108.1 (42.3)	116.2 (46.8)	119.0 (48.3)	117.4 (47.4)	112.2 (44.6)	103.2 (39.6)	88.4 (31.3)	75.5 (24.2)	120.5 (49.2)
Mean daily maximum °F (°C)	65.2 (18.4)	70.4 (21.3)	78.1 (25.6)	85.8 (29.9)	95.2 (35.1)	105.1 (40.6)	109.3 (42.9)	108.1 (42.3)	101.9 (38.8)	89.1 (31.7)	74.9 (23.8)	63.8 (17.7)	87.2 (30.7)
Daily mean °F (°C)	53.9 (12.2)	58.1 (14.5)	64.8 (18.2)	71.7 (22.1)	81.1 (27.3)	90.3 (32.4)	96.0 (35.6)	95.2 (35.1)	88.2 (31.2)	75.3 (24.1)	62.4 (16.9)	52.8 (11.6)	74.2 (23.4)
Mean daily minimum °F (°C)	42.7 (5.9)	45.8 (7.7)	51.4 (10.8)	57.7 (14.3)	66.9 (19.4)	75.5 (24.2)	82.7 (28.2)	82.3 (27.9)	74.5 (23.6)	61.6 (16.4)	50.0 (10.0)	41.8 (5.4)	61.1 (16.2)
Mean minimum °F (°C)	35.6 (2.0)	38.4 (3.6)	43.7 (6.5)	49.4 (9.7)	57.5 (14.2)	66.1 (18.9)	74.8 (23.8)	74.1 (23.4)	65.3 (18.5)	53.0 (11.7)	42.0 (5.6)	35.6 (2.0)	33.7 (0.9)
Record low °F (°C)	24 (−4)	28 (−2)	37 (3)	36 (2)	49 (9)	52 (11)	68 (20)	68 (20)	56 (13)	43 (6)	30 (−1)	25 (−4)	24 (−4)
Average rainfall inches (mm)	0.75 (19)	0.61 (15)	0.48 (12)	0.16 (4.1)	0.03 (0.76)	0.01 (0.25)	0.26 (6.6)	0.38 (9.7)	0.36 (9.1)	0.28 (7.1)	0.30 (7.6)	0.54 (14)	4.16 (106)
Average rainy days (≥ 0.01 in)	2.9	2.8	2.2	0.9	0.3	0.2	1.5	2.1	1.5	1.1	1.1	2.3	18.9
Mean monthly sunshine hours	248.0	254.3	310.0	360.0	403.0	390.0	372.0	372.0	330.0	310.0	240.0	248.0	3,837.3
Mean daily sunshine hours	8.0	9.0	10.0	12.0	13.0	13.0	12.0	12.0	11.0	10.0	8.0	8.0	10.5
Percentage possible sunshine	80	82	83	92	93	93	86	92	92	91	80	80	87
Average ultraviolet index	3	4	6	8	9	10	11	10	8	5	4	2	7
Source 1: National Weather Service / Western Regional Climate Center
Source 2: Weather Atlas

== Demographics ==
Historical population
Census	Pop.	Note	%±
1970	4,111		—
1980	15,909		287.0%
1990	24,363		53.1%
2000	41,938		72.1%
2010	52,527		25.2%
2020	57,144		8.8%
2025 (est.)	59,358		3.9%
U.S. Decennial Census; 2020 Census

According to realtor website Zillow, the average price of a home as of July 31, 2026, in Lake Havasu City was $464,325.

As of the 2024 American Community Survey, there were 28,463 estimated households in Lake Havasu City with an average of 2.04 persons per household. The city has a median household income of $70,148. Approximately 14.1% of the city's population lives at or below the poverty line. Lake Havasu City has an estimated 44.9% employment rate, with 18.5% of the population holding a bachelor's degree or higher and 92.8% holding a high school diploma. There were 35,394 housing units at an average density of 763.81 per square mile (294.91/km^{2}).

The top five reported languages (people were allowed to report up to two languages, thus the figures will generally add to more than 100%) were English (92.1%), Spanish (6.0%), Indo-European (1.2%), Asian and Pacific Islander (0.5%), and Other (0.2%).

The median age in the city was 56.1 years.

Lake Havasu City, Arizona – racial and ethnic composition Note: the US Census treats Hispanic/Latino as an ethnic category. This table excludes Latinos from the racial categories and assigns them to a separate category. Hispanics/Latinos may be of any race.
Race / ethnicity (NH = non-Hispanic)	Pop. 1980	Pop. 1990	Pop. 2000	Pop. 2010	Pop. 2020
White alone (NH)	15,325 (96.33%)	23,189 (95.18%)	37,550 (89.54%)	44,119 (83.99%)	45,521 (79.66%)
Black or African American alone (NH)	17 (0.11%)	55 (0.23%)	127 (0.30%)	329 (0.63%)	309 (0.54%)
Native American or Alaska Native alone (NH)	116 (0.73%)	116 (0.48%)	233 (0.56%)	419 (0.80%)	371 (0.65%)
Asian alone (NH)	35 (0.22%)	101 (0.41%)	233 (0.56%)	486 (0.93%)	609 (1.07%)
Pacific Islander alone (NH)	—	—	38 (0.09%)	54 (0.10%)	69 (0.12%)
Other race alone (NH)	8 (0.05%)	10 (0.04%)	19 (0.05%)	29 (0.06%)	164 (0.29%)
Mixed race or multiracial (NH)	—	—	440 (1.05%)	735 (1.40%)	2,233 (3.91%)
Hispanic or Latino (any race)	408 (2.56%)	892 (3.66%)	3,298 (7.86%)	6,356 (12.10%)	7,868 (13.77%)
Total	15,909 (100.00%)	24,363 (100.00%)	41,938 (100.00%)	52,527 (100.00%)	57,144 (100.00%)

=== 2020 census ===
As of the 2020 census, there were 57,144 people, 26,018 households, and 16,446 families residing in the city. The population density was 1,233.17 inhabitants per square mile (476.13/km^{2}). There were 35,410 housing units at an average density of 764.15 per square mile (295.04/km^{2}). The racial makeup of the city was 83.57% White, 0.62% African American, 1.01% Native American, 1.14% Asian, 0.13% Pacific Islander, 4.55% from some other races and 8.97% from two or more races. Hispanic or Latino people of any race were 13.77% of the population.

=== 2010 census ===
As of the 2010 census, there were 52,527 people, 23,168 households, and 15,304 families residing in the city. The population density was 1,182.11 inhabitants per square mile (456.42/km^{2}). There were 32,327 housing units at an average density of 727.51 per square mile (280.89/km^{2}). The racial makeup of the city was 90.12% White, 0.69% African American, 1.04% Native American, 0.96% Asian, 0.13% Pacific Islander, 4.73% from some other races and 2.34% from two or more races. Hispanic or Latino people of any race were 12.10% of the population.

=== 2000 census ===
As of the 2000 census, there were 41,938 people, 17,911 households, and 12,716 families residing in the city. The population density was 974.40 inhabitants per square mile (376.22/km^{2}). There were 23,018 housing units at an average density of 534.81 per square mile (206.49/km^{2}). The racial makeup of the city was 94.35% White, 0.31% African American, 0.69% Native American, 0.58% Asian, 0.10% Pacific Islander, 2.51% from some other races and 1.46% from two or more races. Hispanic or Latino people of any race were 7.86% of the population.

There were 17,911 households out of which 22.5% have children under the age of 18 living with them, 59.4% were married couples living together, 7.7% have a female householder with no husband present, and 29.0% were non-families. 22.8% of all households were made up of individuals and 11.8% have someone living alone who was 65 years of age or older. The average household size was 2.32 and the average family size was 2.69.

In the city the population was spread out with 19.4% under the age of 18, 5.7% from 18 to 24, 21.6% from 25 to 44, 27.7% from 45 to 64, and 25.5% who were 65 years of age or older. The median age was 48 years. For every 100 females there were 96.8 males. For every 100 females age 18 and over, there were 94.3 males.

The median income for a household in the city was $36,499, and the median income for a family was $41,393. Males have a median income of $31,594 versus $21,576 for females. The per capita income for the city was $20,403. 9.5% of the population and 6.6% of families were below the poverty line. Out of the total people living in poverty, 15.8% were under the age of 18 and 5.2% were 65 or older.

== Education ==
Lake Havasu City is served by the Lake Havasu Unified School District. There are currently six elementary schools: Jamaica Elementary, Oro Grande Classical Academy, Starline Elementary, Smoketree Elementary, Nautilus Elementary, and Havasupai Elementary), one middle school (Thunderbolt Middle School), one high school (Lake Havasu High School), and several alternative schools in the city including Telesis Preparatory Academy and Havasu Preparatory Academy. Lake Havasu Unified went through some strict budget cuts, closing one of its two middle schools (Daytona Middle School), and distributing 6th graders throughout the elementaries and 7th and 8th grades to Thunderbolt Middle School. Local voters passed a bond and a budget override for the district in 2016, helping to alleviate some school district budget problems.

A campus of Mohave Community College is located in Lake Havasu City. MCC is also home to one of the Northern Arizona University extended campuses. Arizona State University opened a new lower-tuition 4-year college campus, the ASU Colleges at Lake Havasu City, in August 2012. In September 2024, ASU announced that the campus would close in June 2025 in response to state budget cuts.

== Government ==
The city operates under a council-manager form of government. The mayor and six councilmembers are elected to staggered four-year terms. The City Council sets the city's policy and direction, and appoints the City Manager, who is tasked with the responsibility for carrying out council policies and administering the day-to-day operations. Per the City Code, the Department Directors are appointed by the City Manager.

As of November, 2008, 64 percent of registered voters in Lake Havasu City are Republican, 35 percent Democrat, and the remaining 1 percent Independent.

Lake Havasu City hosted the final appreciation dinner for retiring United States Senator Barry Goldwater, the 1964 Republican Party presidential nominee, at the Nautical Inn Convention Center on October 21, 1986.

== Notable people ==
- Roy Thomas Baker, English record producer, songwriter and arranger.
- David Bazan, indie rock singer-songwriter, most notably of Pedro the Lion
- Michael Biehn, actor
- Chuck Crim, former Major League baseball pitcher
- Crystal Hefner, Playboy Miss December 2009, widow of the late Hugh Hefner
- Robert P. McCulloch, CEO of McCulloch chainsaws and purchaser of the London Bridge tourist attraction
- Bob Milacki, former Major League baseball pitcher
- Gary Simmons, former National Hockey League player

== In popular culture ==
The Day of the Wolves is a 1971 heist film starring Richard Egan. It was directed, written, and produced by Ferde Grofe Jr. It was the first film to be made on location in the new town of Lake Havasu City.

The London Bridge's relocation to Arizona was the basis of the 1985 television film Bridge Across Time (also known as Arizona Ripper or Terror at London Bridge), directed by E.W. Swackhamer and starring David Hasselhoff and Stepfanie Kramer. In the film, a series of murders in Lake Havasu is attributed to the spirit of Jack the Ripper, whose soul is transported to America in one of the bricks of the London Bridge.

In the 1993 film Falling Down, Lake Havasu City is mentioned several times as the location to which Robert Duvall's character is supposed to be moving, due to the wife's obsession with London Bridge.

The director Andy Sidaris directed three soft-core adult films in Lake Havasu: 1989's Savage Beach, 1990's Guns, and 1992's Hard Hunted.

MTV featured Lake Havasu during its Spring Break coverage in 1995.

The comedy-adventure Border to Border was filmed in Lake Havasu in 1998. Actor Curtis Armstrong and Lisa Arturo were the leads, with a cameo by porn star Ron Jeremy.

Piranha 3D was filmed in Lake Havasu in 2009. The city was called Lake Victoria in the film. It was directed by Alexandre Aja and starred Adam Scott, Elisabeth Shue, Kelly Brook, Richard Dreyfuss, Jerry O'Connell, Ving Rhames, and Christopher Lloyd. The film is a remake of the 1978 film Piranha. It debuted in Lake Havasu on August 19, 2010, and was released nationally on August 20, 2010.

The Concepts x New Balance Made in U.K. 991.5 "Lake Havasu" athletic shoe was inspired by the story of the London Bridge's relocation to Arizona, and the transatlantic partnership between U.K. shoe manufacturer New Balance and American shoe retailer Concepts. Lake Havasu City Mayor Mark Nexsen officially declared February 27, 2018 as "Concepts/New Balance 991.5 'Made in U.K.' Lake Havasu Shoe Day."

Indie rock band Pedro the Lion's sixth studio album Havasu was written about the one year of childhood the singer spent living in the city.

== Attractions ==
- London Bridge
- Lake Havasu and Colorado River
- Wheeler Park
- Lake Havasu Historical Society
- The Aquatic Center
- Patrick Tinell Memorial Skatepark
- Rotary Community Park
- Lake Havasu City Airport (KHII)
- Minor league baseball: the Blythe Heat of the Arizona Winter League and the Lake Havasu Heat of the Pacific Southwest Baseball League play regular season games.
- Havasu 95 Speedway
- Lighthouses on the Colorado River

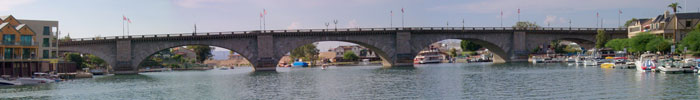
London Bridge

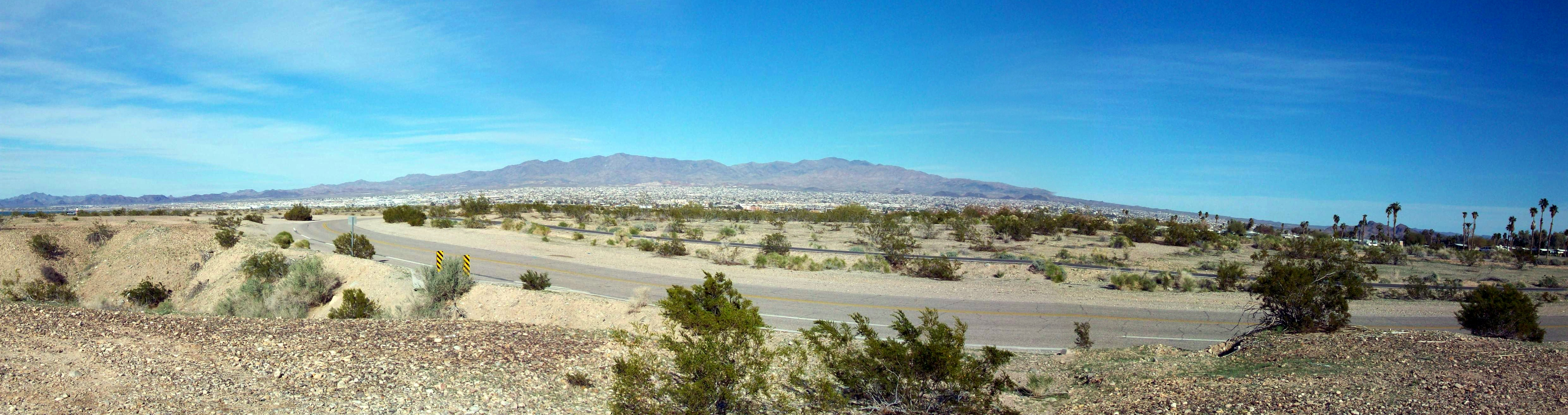
Lake Havasu City from the west
