= KFPH-CD =

Television station in Phoenix, Arizona

ATSC 3.0 station Translator of KFPH-DT, Flagstaff, Arizona
- Phoenix, Arizona; United States
- City: Phoenix, Arizona
- Channels: Digital: 35 (UHF); Virtual: 35
- Branding: UniMás Arizona

Programming
- Affiliations: 35.1: UniMás; 35.3: Great

Ownership
- Owner: TelevisaUnivision; (UniMas Partnership of Phoenix)
- Sister stations: KTVW-DT, KHOT-FM, KOMR

History
- First air date: June 7, 1987
- Former call signs: K39BI (1987–1998); KDTP-LP (1998–2001); KOND-LP (2001–2002); KFPH-CA (2002–2011)
- Former channel numbers: Analog: 39 (UHF, 1987–1999); 35 (UHF, 1999–2011)
- Former affiliations: ACTS, FamilyNet (until 2017), Daystar, America's Collectibles Network
- Call sign meaning: Telefutura/Phoenix

Technical information
- Licensing authority: FCC
- Facility ID: 2739
- Class: CD
- ERP: 15 kW
- HAAT: 510 m (1,673 ft)
- Transmitter coordinates: 33°20′0″N 112°3′49″W

Links
- Public license information: Public file; LMS
- Website: UniMás

KFPH-CD (channel 35) is a low-power, Class A television station in Phoenix, Arizona, United States, airing programming from the Spanish-language UniMás network. It is a translator of Flagstaff-licensed KFPH-DT (channel 13) which is owned and operated by TelevisaUnivision; it is also sister to Univision outlet KTVW-DT (channel 33). KFPH-CD's transmitter is located on South Mountain; its parent station shares studios with KTVW-DT on 30th Street in southern Phoenix.

Originally established as a translator for the American Christian Television System (ACTS) on channel 39, the station moved to channel 35 when a full-power television station was established on channel 39 in 2000. It has been owned by Univision since 2002 and has served primarily as a translator of KFPH-DT. KFPH-CD was converted in April 2018 to be one of the first regular ATSC 3.0 television stations in the United States as part of the Phoenix Model Market initiative and since has been regularly used for testing; its programming is available in ATSC 1.0 format on subchannels of other Phoenix television stations.

== History ==
North Phoenix Baptist Church received a construction permit for low-power television station K39BI in December 1986; the station was on the air less than six months later and began broadcasting programs on June 7, 1987. Alongside programming from ACTS—owned by the Southern Baptist Convention—K39BI produced some of its own programming, including the Baptist church's services. In the 1990s, ACTS was replaced with FamilyNet.

Underneath K39BI was a full-power allocation for channel 39, the second non-commercial reserved channel in Phoenix. In 1996, the Daystar Television Network, by way of Community Television, Inc., filed for the channel. Two years later, Daystar bought K39BI from the church; Daystar programming replaced FamilyNet, though North Phoenix Baptist Church services were still broadcast. The call letters were changed to KDTP-LP on December 16, 1998.

The impending launch of KDTP as a full-power station displaced the low-power station to channel 35. Daystar also sold the low-power station to Equity Broadcasting Corporation, which owned KDUO channel 13 in Flagstaff, and changed KDTP-LP's call letters to KOND-LP. The stations aired programming from America's Collectibles Network before being sold for $19.1 million to Univision in late 2001 alongside KBGF in Douglas. KDUO and KOND-LP became KFPH and KFPH-CA on January 4, 2002, in advance of the launch of Telefutura ten days later.

=== ATSC 3.0 ===
In December 2017, the Phoenix Model Market partnership, comprising Pearl TV and the television station groups that owned most of Phoenix's commercial stations at the time, including Univision Communications, was formed in order to provide guidance and testing for how the ATSC 3.0 standard could be deployed without reducing ATSC 1.0 service to existing viewers, using the "lighthouse" concept, in which one station becomes an ATSC 3.0 multiplex and its subchannels are distributed on the signals of other stations serving the same area. In service of this goal, KFPH-CD was selected to become the first lighthouse station and the first authorized ATSC 3.0 station, going live on April 6, 2018; KFPH-CD's subchannels were placed with three other Phoenix stations for ATSC 1.0 continuity. Soon after launching, Arizona PBS joined the Model Market consortium, becoming the first public broadcaster to use ATSC 3.0.

== Subchannels ==
=== ATSC 1.0 subchannels ===
Subchannels provided by KFPH-CD (ATSC 1.0)
Subchannel	Res.	Short name	Programming	ATSC 1.0 host
35.1	1080i	KFPH-CD	UniMás	KTVW-DT
35.3	480i	GetTV	Great	KTAZ

The KFPH-CD ATSC 3.0 multiplex carries an assortment of Phoenix television stations. On July 8, 2021, the two remaining major network affiliates on KFPH-CD were relocated to the higher-power KASW multiplex on RF channel 27, and the channel capacity on KFPH-CD was used to add KTVK and KTAZ to the lineup.

=== ATSC 3.0 subchannels ===
Subchannels of KFPH-CD (ATSC 3.0)
Subchannel	Res.	Short name	Programming
3.1	1080p	KTVK*3	Independent (KTVK)
8.1	720p	KAET*8	PBS (KAET)
33.1	1080p	KTVW*33	Univision (KTVW-DT)
35.1	1080p	KFPH*35	UniMás
39.1	1080p	KTAZ*39	Telemundo (KTAZ)

KFPH-CD offers two ATSC 1.0 subchannels, hosted by KTVW-DT and KTAZ.
