= KDTP =

Television station in Holbrook, Arizona

- Holbrook, Arizona (Note: Originally licensed to Phoenix, Arizona; moved to Holbrook in 2006.); United States
- Channels: Digital: 11 (VHF); Virtual: 11

Programming
- Affiliations: 11.1: Daystar; for others, see § Subchannels

Ownership
- Owner: Word of God Fellowship; (Community Television Educators, Inc.)

History
- First air date: January 2, 2001
- Former channel numbers: Analog: 39 (UHF, 2001–2006), 11 (VHF, 2006–2009)
- Call sign meaning: Daystar Television Phoenix

Technical information
- Licensing authority: FCC
- Facility ID: 83491
- ERP: 3.2 kW
- HAAT: 54 m (177 ft)
- Transmitter coordinates: 34°55′13.4″N 110°7′55.2″W
- Translator(s): KDPH-LD 48 Phoenix

Links
- Public license information: Public file; LMS
- Website: www.daystar.com

KDTP (channel 11) is a religious television station in Holbrook, Arizona, United States, owned by the Daystar Television Network. The station's offices are located in downtown Holbrook, and its transmitter is located northeast of the city.

Although KDTP is licensed as a full-power station, its broadcasting radius only covers the immediate Holbrook area. Therefore, it operates a low-power translator station, KDPH-LD (channel 48) in Phoenix, which relays KDTP's programming to the Phoenix metropolitan area, as KDTP's signal is blocked by mountains and operates on only 3.2 kW.

== History ==
An original construction permit for KDTP was issued on January 10, 2000, to Community Television Educators for a station to broadcast on channel 39, a non-commercial allocation in Phoenix. It replaced low-power K39BI (now KFPH-CD), which had been the local Daystar station, but had been moved to channel 35 and sold. The station was licensed on November 14, 2001, airing Daystar programming. In June 2006, the station was part of a facilities swap with KPHZ (now KTAZ), which moved the station from Phoenix channel 39 to Holbrook channel 11.

=== License swap ===
In 2004, NBC Universal, owner of a Class A LPTV station in Phoenix, KDRX-CA (now KDPH-LD), reached an agreement with KDTP that would allow the Telemundo network to secure a full-service station in order to compete on even terms with the leading Spanish-language station in town, Univision-owned KTVW-TV. NBCU would move its full-service station KPHZ channel 11 from Holbrook to Phoenix, taking the channel 39 allocation held by KDTP. In return, Daystar would move its full-service station KDTP channel 39 from Phoenix to Holbrook, taking the channel 11 allocation held by KPHZ. As compensation, NBC Telemundo would transfer KDRX-CA to Daystar, plus additional consideration, which turned out to be LPTV station KPHZ-LP (now KDTP-LP).

Complicating the issue was that KDTP was on a non-commercial reserved channel in Phoenix, and for the plan to go forward, the FCC would need to remove the non-commercial reservation from channel 39, something that it is extremely reluctant to do. Nevertheless, and in spite of Univision's objection, the FCC concluded that the addition of a competitive Spanish-language service outweighs the loss of a second non-commercial allocation, and approved of the plan. By July 2006, the transfer was completed.

== Subchannels ==
The station's signal is multiplexed:

Subchannels of KDTP
Subchannel	Res.	Short name	Programming
11.1	1080i	KDTP-DT	Daystar
11.2	720p	KDTP-ES	Daystar Español
11.3	480i	KDTP-SD	Daystar Reflections
