= KUVE-DT =

Television station in Green Valley, Arizona

KUVE-DT and KUVE-CD
Semi-satellites of KTVW-DT, Phoenix, Arizona

KUVE-DT: Green Valley, Arizona; KUVE-CD: Tucson, Arizona; United States
- Channels for KUVE-DT: Digital: 34 (UHF); Virtual: 46
- Channels for KUVE-CD: Digital: 36 (UHF); Virtual: 42
- Branding: Univision Arizona; UniMás Arizona (46.2/42.2); Noticias N+ Univision Arizona (newscasts)

Programming
- Affiliations: 46.1/42.1: Univision; 46.2/42.2: UniMás; for others, see § Subchannels

Ownership
- Owner: TelevisaUnivision; (Univision Tucson LLC)
- Sister stations: KFTU-DT

History
- Founded: KUVE-DT: 2000
- First air date: KUVE-DT: January 5, 2001; KUVE-CD: November 1, 1980
- Former call signs: KUVE-DT: KXGR (2001–2003); KUVE-CD: K40AC (1980–1985); K52AO (1985–1998); KUVE-LP (1998–2002); KUVE-CA (2002–2015)
- Former channel number: KUVE-DT: Analog: 46 (UHF, 2001–2008); Digital: 47 (UHF, until 2009), 46 (UHF, 2009–2018); KUVE-CD: Analog: 40 (UHF, 1980–1985), 52 (UHF, 1985–2001), 38 (UHF, 2001–2015); Digital: 42 (UHF, 2015–2018)
- Former affiliations: KUVE-DT: Pax TV (2001–2003)

Technical information
- Licensing authority: FCC
- Facility ID: KUVE-DT: 63927; KUVE-CD: 78036
- Class: KUVE-CD: CD
- ERP: KUVE-DT: 185 kW; KUVE-CD: 15 kW
- HAAT: KUVE-DT: 1,124 m (3,688 ft); KUVE-CD: 577.8 m (1,896 ft)
- Transmitter coordinates: KUVE-DT: 32°24′54″N 110°42′57.9″W; KUVE-CD: 32°14′55.8″N 111°6′59.9″W
- Translator: KFTU-DT 3.2 Douglas

Links
- Public license information: KUVE-DT: Public file; LMS; KUVE-CD: Public file; LMS
- Website: UnivisionArizona.com

KUVE-DT (channel 46) is a television station licensed to Green Valley, Arizona, United States, serving as the Tucson market's outlet for the Spanish-language network Univision. It is owned and operated by TelevisaUnivision alongside Douglas-licensed UniMás outlet KFTU-DT (channel 3). The two stations share studios on Forbes Boulevard in Tucson; KUVE-DT's transmitter is located atop Mount Bigelow.

KUVE operates a low-power Class A translator station: KUVE-CD (channel 42), licensed to Tucson. This station's transmitter is located atop the Tucson Mountains, serving the northwest parts of the metropolitan area shielded from the primary station by Mount Lemmon. KUVE-DT is also rebroadcast on the second digital subchannel of KFTU-DT, whose transmitter is located on Juniper Flats Road northwest of Bisbee. Likewise, KFTU is rebroadcast on KUVE's second digital subchannel.

Although identifying as a separate station in its own right, KUVE is considered a semi-satellite of KTVW-DT (channel 33) in Phoenix. It airs separate commercials and legal identifications but otherwise simulcasts all of KTVW's Univision programming and statewide newscasts produced in Phoenix. There is also a three-hour overnight segment of locally produced English-language programming on KUVE on Monday mornings from 2 to 5 a.m., to comply with KUVE-CD's Class A license.

== History ==
KTVW began broadcasting to the Tucson area on November 1, 1980, when it built a translator on channel 40. K40AC was displaced from the channel by the launch of KPOL-TV in 1985, moving to channel 52. The call letters were changed to KUVE-LP in 1998.

Meanwhile, in 1983, four groups applied for Green Valley's channel 46, with their applications being designated for comparative hearing. Sungilt Corporation got the nod and the construction permit on October 31, 1988, and the permit took the call letters KXGR in 1990. After Paxson Communications Corporation announced plans to operate and acquire KXGR alongside stations in Fayetteville, North Carolina, and Charleston, West Virginia, it was identified as an intended affiliate of Paxnet, but the station failed to materialize; by the time of the network's August 1998 launch, it was tabbed to start in the second quarter of 1999.

After twelve years, five expired construction permits and two transmitter location changes, KXGR applied for its license to cover on December 21, 2000, and signed on as a Pax affiliate on January 5, 2001, under program test authority. However, at the completion of the first day of program testing, the station's transmitter failed, and it was unable to return to the airwaves until June 1, and then, only at low power for a minimum of two hours a day. After ten days, the station was again forced to go dark, and after being threatened with license cancellation, KXGR advised the FCC on November 28, 2001, that they had resumed program testing. The station was finally licensed on June 2, 2003.

Sungilt made two attempts to sell the station. Donald E. Ledwig agreed to buy KXGR for $15 million in early 2001, with $1 million of that going to Paxson. The deal never received approval and fell apart after one year. In January 2002, shortly after resuming program testing, Sungilt agreed to sell the station to Univision. The sale was approved by the FCC in September 2003 and completed in November. The new owners changed the station's call sign to KUVE-TV, to match the low-power station's call sign.

Former logo, used until December 31, 2012.

== Technical information ==
=== Subchannels ===
The station's signal is multiplexed:

Subchannels of KUVE-DT and KUVE-CD
Subchannel		Res.	Short name	Programming
KUVE-DT	KUVE-CD	Res.	Short name	Programming
46.1	42.1	720p	KUVE-DT	Univision
46.2	42.2	720p	KFTU-HD	UniMás (KFTU-DT)
46.3	42.3	480i	getTV	Great (4:3)
46.4	42.4	480i	MVSGLD	MovieSphere Gold
46.5	42.5	480i	ShopLC	Shop LC
46.6	42.6	480i	DABL	Dabl
46.7	42.7	480i	BT2	Infomercials

Simulcast of subchannels of another station
Subchannel broadcast with MPEG-4 video

=== Analog-to-digital conversion ===
KUVE ended regular programming on its analog signal, over UHF channel 46, on September 18, 2008. The station cited a lack of space at its transmitter site to accommodate both the analog and digital transmitters, an issue that could not be rectified as the transmitter building lies on United States Forest Service land; additionally, winter weather conditions rendered it impossible to perform work after October. The station's digital signal relocated from its pre-transition UHF channel 47 to channel 46.
