= KUDF-LP =

Television station in Tucson, Arizona

- Tucson, Arizona; United States
- Channels: Digital: 14 (UHF); Virtual: 14
- Branding: Estrella Tucson

Programming
- Affiliations: 14.1: Estrella TV; for others, see § Subchannels

Ownership
- Owner: LM Media Group, Inc.

History
- Founded: February 28, 1989
- First air date: April 1, 1989
- Former call signs: K14HR (1989–1996); KQBN-LP (1996–2004)
- Former affiliations: Telemundo (1989–1992); FamilyNet (1993−1996); Telenoticias (1996−1999); Telemax (1999–2004); Dark (2004–2005); Azteca America (2005–2022)
- Call sign meaning: Tucson XHDF (TV Azteca flagship)

Technical information
- Licensing authority: FCC
- Facility ID: 27278
- Class: LP
- ERP: 3.02 kW
- HAAT: 1,080 m (3,543 ft)

Links
- Public license information: LMS
- Website: aztecaamericatucson.com

KUDF-LP (channel 14) is a low-power television station in Tucson, Arizona, United States, broadcasting the Spanish-language network Estrella TV. The station is owned by LM Media Group, Inc. It is carried on the major cable television systems in Tucson.

== History ==
An original construction permit for a low-power television station on channel 14 was granted to K. Sandoval Burke, one of the two co-owners of Hispanic Broadcasters of Tucson, on February 28, 1989. The station, K14HR "KHR-TV", signed on April 1 as Tucson's first Telemundo affiliate and first locally programmed Spanish-language station. The station was profitable within eight months, ahead of projections. Hispanic Broadcasters, owned by Burke and Jay S. Zucker, also owned the low-power Telemundo station in Phoenix, K64DR.

In 1991, Jay Zucker purchased the license of silent KPOL (channel 40) out of bankruptcy for $45,000. On July 1, 1992, channel 40 returned to the air as KHRR, K14HR's full-power replacement. On January 1, 1993, with Telemundo now on channel 40, channel 14 relaunched as an English-language station carrying FamilyNet programming and branded as "KFAM". KFAM aired such shows as The 700 Club, kids shows, other religious shows, sports specials, and pet shows. The station had no cable carriage, and shows soon moved to stations that were on cable: "Shepherd's Chapel", for instance, moved to KTTU (channel 18, now a MyNetworkTV affiliate).

In April 1996, Zucker relaunched "KFAM" as KQBN-LP "Qué Bien", aiming to target upper-income Hispanic households. The station was described as "like CNN in the daytime and HBO in primetime", showing news from Telenoticias (now Telemundo Internacional) in the day, uncut Spanish-language movies in the evening, and novelas at other times. Among launch programs included the soap opera Las aguas mansas between the newscasts from 8 to 9pm.

Final logo as an Azteca America affiliate, from 2020 until the network's 2022 shutdown.

In 1999, Hispanic Broadcasters sold itself to the Apogee Companies; by this time, KQBN-LP was entirely rebroadcasting programming from Telemax, the state network of the neighboring Mexican state of Sonora. In January 2004, Una Vez Más Holdings bought the station from Apogee and changed the call letters to KUDF-LP, intending to switch to Azteca America. However, the station went silent and was not seen on air until November 2005, when it began broadcasting Azteca America programming.

LM Media Group bought KUDF-LP in 2012 for $810,000. The LM represents Mexican businessman Roberto Lemmen Meyer.

=== KQBN call letters on other stations ===
Although Una Vez Más replaced the call letters when they took control of operations in January 2004, KQBN-LP has since been assigned to two other Una Vez Más stations – channel 43 in Phoenix took the call letters in March 2005, then when they sold the station the following November, Una Vez Mas transferred the KQBN-LP call letters to channel 28 in Prescott.

== Subchannels ==
The station's signal is multiplexed:

Subchannels of KUDF-LP
Subchannel	Res.	Short name	Programming
14.1	720p	Estrell	Estrella TV
14.2	480i	KUDF14.	[Blank]
14.3	480i	LATV	LATV
14.4	480i	GoodNws	"Good News TV" (3ABN)
14.5	480i	Telemax	Telemax (4:3)
14.6	480i	GNTV Es	"Good News TV Latino" (3ABN Latino)
14.7	480i	KUDF 14	[Blank]
