= KKMR =

Radio station in Arizona City, Arizona

- Arizona City, Arizona; United States
- Broadcast area: Casa Grande
- Frequency: 106.5 MHz

Programming
- Format: Contemporary Christian
- Network: K-Love

Ownership
- Owner: Educational Media Foundation
- Sister stations: KLVA, KLVK

History
- First air date: April 13, 1985
- Former call signs: KKAF (1981–1986, CP); KXMK (1986–1990); KONZ (1990–1997); KBZR (1997–2001); KOMR (11/8–27/2001); KKRM (2001–2002)
- Former frequencies: 106.3 MHz (1986–1997)
- Call sign meaning: Derived from former Amor format

Technical information
- Licensing authority: FCC
- Facility ID: 2740
- Class: A
- ERP: 860 watts
- HAAT: 266 meters (873 ft)
- Transmitter coordinates: 32°50′04″N 111°38′15″W

Links
- Public license information: Public file; LMS
- Website: klove.com

KKMR (106.5 MHz) is a non-commercial FM radio station licensed to Arizona City, Arizona, and serving the Phoenix metropolitan area. It is owned by the Educational Media Foundation and it airs a Christian Contemporary radio format, as part of the K-Love network. Its transmitter is located south of Casa Grande in the Casa Grande Mountains.

== History ==
The station signed on the air on April 13, 1985. Its original call sign was KXMK, and it broadcast at 106.3 MHz. The original owner was the Sonoro Broadcasting Company. FM 106.3 spent most of its early time on the air simulcasting other stations, especially former co-channel station KOMR, which acquired it in 1990 (when KOMR was KONC) to reduce interference and created a regional simulcast of its classical music format. This station bore the call sign KONZ. It later shared KEDJ's modern rock format. In 1997, it moved one spot up the Phoenix radio dial and began stints as an adult album alternative (AAA) station and an oldies outlet before returning to simulcasting KEDJ in 1999.

In 2001, Hispanic Broadcasting Corporation acquired the station and changed it to a Spanish-language adult contemporary format called "Amor". It was a simulcast with 106.5 KOMR and 100.3 KQMR. The station was assigned the KKMR call letters by the U.S. Federal Communications Commission (FCC) on February 13, 2002. In October 2005, Univision adjusted the "Amor" format, making it more oldies-driven, and changed the name to "Recuerdo".

The station applied for an FCC construction permit in 2000 for a power increase to class C3. It was granted in 2010 after much modification and application tweaking. This was overseen by the Hispanic Broadcasting Corporation's engineering department, which also secured other upgrades such as KESS-FM in Dallas, KAMA-FM in Houston, and WADO in New York City. The permit expired on January 15, 2013.

In June 2017, Univision agreed to sell KKMR for $500,000 to the Educational Media Foundation (EMF), which converted it to noncommercial operation. It originally was part of EMF's Air1 network. The sale was completed on November 16, 2017. In 2019, EMF changed KKMR from Air1 to its K-Love network as part of a major switch of EMF stations and translators in Central Arizona.
