= KTAZ =

Television station in Phoenix, Arizona

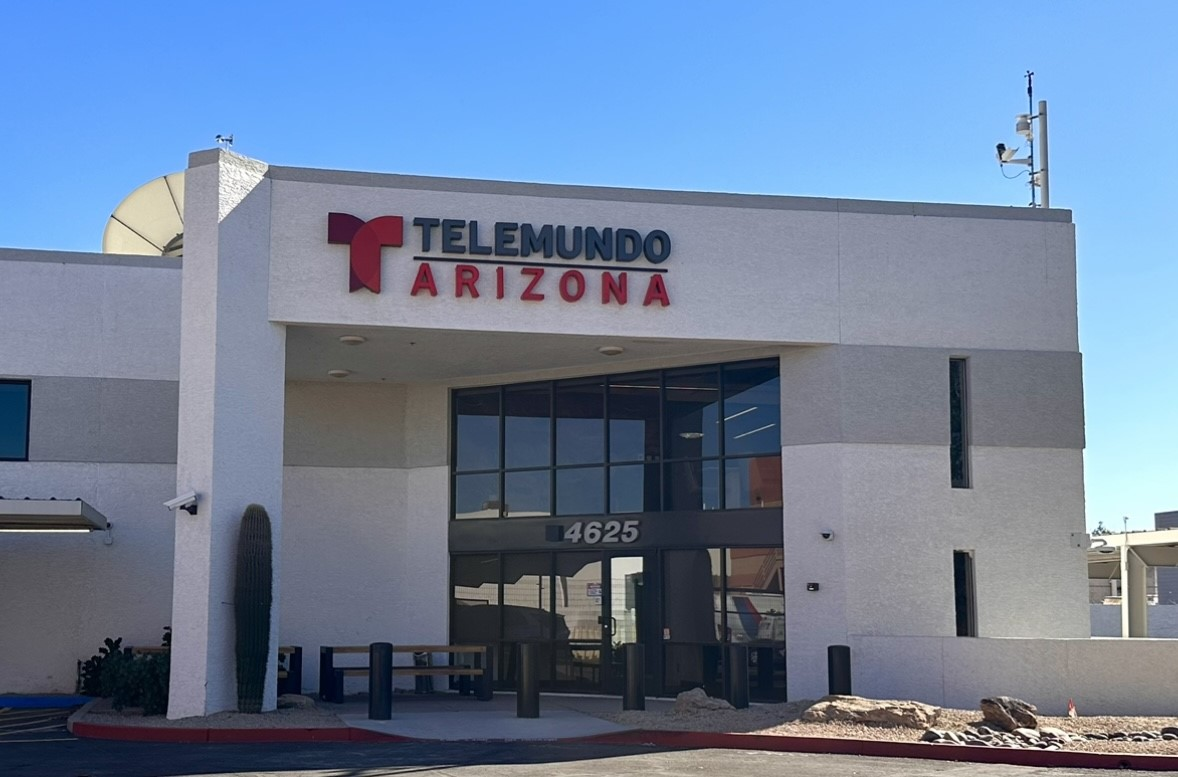
- Telemundo Arizona's South Phoenix studios
- Phoenix, Arizona; United States
- Channels: Digital: 29 (UHF); Virtual: 39
- Branding: Telemundo Phoenix (general); Noticiero Telemundo Arizona (newscasts)

Programming
- Affiliations: 39.1: Telemundo; for others, see § Subchannels

Ownership
- Owner: Telemundo Station Group; (NBC Telemundo License LLC)

History
- First air date: January 12, 2001 (in Holbrook, Arizona; license moved to Phoenix in 2006)
- Former call signs: KPHZ (2001–2006)
- Former channel numbers: Analog: 11 (VHF, 2001–2006), 39 (UHF, 2006–2009); Digital: 39 (UHF, 2009–2018)
- Former affiliations: ACN (2001–2003; secondary after 2002)
- Call sign meaning: Telemundo Arizona

Technical information
- Licensing authority: FCC
- Facility ID: 81458
- ERP: 595 kW
- HAAT: 544.7 m (1,787 ft)
- Transmitter coordinates: 33°20′3″N 112°3′41″W

Links
- Public license information: Public file; LMS
- Website: www.telemundoarizona.com

KTAZ (channel 39) is a television station in Phoenix, Arizona, United States, serving as the local outlet for the Spanish-language network Telemundo. Owned and operated by NBCUniversal's Telemundo Station Group, KTAZ maintains studios on South 33rd Place in Phoenix, and its transmitter is located atop South Mountain on the city's south side. In Tucson, KHRR (channel 40) operates as a semi-satellite of KTAZ with local advertising. Statewide newscasts for both stations, Noticiero Telemundo Arizona, are produced from Phoenix.

Telemundo's broadcast history in Phoenix and northern Arizona is unusually convoluted. The network first appeared in 1989 on low-power station K64DR, later KDRX-LP and KDRX-CA. Despite being a low-power station, KDRX began airing local newscasts in 1997 and was sold to the Telemundo network in 2002. However, the signal left the station at a disadvantage to Telemundo's competitor, Univision. As a result, in 2005, Telemundo and the Daystar Television Network agreed in 2005 to an unusual license and facility swap; Telemundo traded a full-power station in Holbrook, Arizona—KPHZ, which had mostly aired home shopping programming—and KDRX-CA for its full-power KDTP (channel 39), which was accompanied by the redesignation of channel 39 for commercial use. (Note: As a result of the way this was structured, the commercial license for Holbrook channel 11 became the current license for Phoenix channel 39.)

== History ==
In 1986, the Federal Communications Commission (FCC) designated VHF channel 11 as a commercial allotment for Holbrook. The allotment lay vacant until April 1996, when Channel 11 LLC applied for a permit to build a TV station. The application was granted on January 23, 1998, and in March, Channel 11 requested KBCZ for its call sign. In August 2000, Channel 11 struck an agreement to sell the station to Venture Technologies Group, LLC, which was approved in November and consummated in December. Venture immediately changed the call letters to KPHZ and requested a waiver of the Main Studio Rule so that they could operate their new station out of existing facilities in Phoenix, used for stations KPHZ-LP (channel 58, now KDTP-LP channel 48) and KPSW-LP (channel 41, now KPDF-CD), instead of having the added expense of studio facilities in Holbrook. Venture signed the station on air in January 2001 as an affiliate of the home shopping channel America's Collectibles Network (ACN)—now Jewelry Television (JTV). The FCC granted a license to KPHZ on December 5, 2001. The station was never profitable, and in April 2002, shortly after its acquisition by NBC, Telemundo reached an agreement with Venture to acquire KPHZ, along with Venture's two Phoenix low power stations. The FCC granted the request on August 23, and the purchase was consummated on September 26. KPHZ was Telemundo's second full-power station in Arizona, after KHRR in Tucson, but it continued to air ACN programming until July 2003, when it switched to Telemundo programming.

=== License swap ===
By 2004, NBCUniversal concluded that in a small town like Holbrook (which had a population of 4,917, according to the 2000 U.S. census), KPHZ was losing money and would likely have to be shut down. At the same time, the company had determined that its Phoenix-based Class A LPTV station, KDRX-CA (channel 48, later KDPH-LP), could not adequately compete with Univision's full-power station KTVW-TV.

NBCUniversal reached an agreement with the Daystar Television Network, and the two broadcasters together filed an application with the FCC to move the KPHZ license from Holbrook to Phoenix, where it would broadcast on channel 39. Daystar's KDTP license would move from Phoenix to Holbrook, broadcasting on channel 11. It was an unusual and complicated request that involved not only a swap of cities of license and frequencies, but would also require removing the non-commercial reservation from channel 39 in Phoenix and creating a non-commercial reservation on channel 11 in Holbrook. Holbrook already had a non-commercial allocation on channel 18 which had never been built and most likely never would be. In addition, NBCUniversal would transfer KDRX-CA and KPHZ-LP to Daystar, preserving a Daystar outlet in Phoenix, and it would pay Daystar $49 million.

The FCC is extremely reluctant to remove a non-commercial reservation from a market, and naturally, Univision objected to the proposal, but in October 2005, the FCC agreed to allow the switch, saying that the benefit of having competing full-power Spanish-language television stations in the Phoenix market outweighed the loss of the non-commercial reservation. In April 2006, the FCC granted construction permits to move the licenses.

On May 27, 2006, the KTAZ call letters were moved to the channel 39 license. There were a few complications with the move, requiring newly named KTAZ to move to a different broadcast tower. KTAZ temporarily kept the Daystar programming, and the Telemundo programming remained on channel 11, which became KDTP-CA (later KDPH-LP), while KTAZ's permanent transmitter facilities were being constructed; the move was completed on July 23, 2006.

== Newscasts ==
The first newscast on Telemundo Phoenix debuted in October 1997, produced by local ABC affiliate KNXV. Several years later, after then-KDRX had moved into KNXV's former studio facilities, the station began to produce its own news programming. Under cost-cutting measures in 2007, KTAZ's news began to be produced from a news hub in Fort Worth, Texas; the production of the shows was restored to Phoenix several years later, and until 2014, KTAZ additionally produced the local newscasts seen on KBLR in Las Vegas. That later ended in July 2014 when KBLR debuted its own local newscast.

Beginning in 2014, a series of local news expansions at Telemundo have added hours of news to KTAZ's output. On July 26, 2014, KTAZ began producing weekend newscasts to air at 5 and 10 p.m., and the station initiated local weather forecasting, a function previously outsourced to KDEN-TV in Denver. A 4:30 p.m. newscast debuted at KTAZ and 13 other Telemundo stations that September. A 4 p.m. half-hour was added in 2016, again as part of a national expansion in the group. In 2018, a midday newscast was introduced at KTAZ and nine other Telemundo stations. Two years later, KTAZ began producing a local version of Enfoque, Telemundo's local public affairs program, airing twice a month.

KTAZ's newscasts are also aired on KHRR in Tucson. Tucson news and weather is incorporated into the broadcasts.

== Technical information ==
=== Subchannels ===
The station's signal is multiplexed. The 39.1 subchannel is also broadcast in ATSC 3.0 (NextGen TV) format on KFPH-CD.

Subchannels of KTAZ
Subchannel	Res.	Short name	Programming
39.1	1080i	KTAZ-DT	Telemundo
39.2	480i	TeleX	TeleXitos
39.3	480i	COZI	Cozi TV
39.4	480i	NBC LX	NBC True CRMZ
39.5	480i	Oxygen	Oxygen
39.6	480i	Nosey	Nosey
35.3	480i	GetTV	Great (KFPH-CD) (4:3)

Broadcast on behalf of another station

=== Analog-to-digital transition ===
Because it was granted an original construction permit after the FCC finalized the DTV allotment plan on April 21, 1997, the station did not receive a companion channel for its digital signal. Instead, at the end of the digital conversion period for full-power television stations, KTAZ was required to turn off its analog signal and turn on its digital signal (called a "flash-cut"). The station's digital signal went into operation on its former analog-era UHF channel 39 on June 12, 2009, the official date on which full-power television stations in the United States transitioned from analog to digital broadcasts under federal mandate.
