= KPOL =

KPOL may refer to:

- KPOL (AM), a defunct radio station (1540 AM) in Los Angeles, California, United States from 1952 to 1981
- KPOL (TV), a defunct television station (channel 40) in Tucson, Arizona, United States from 1985 to 1989
- KSCN-TV, a television station (virtual channel 22 / VHF digital 4) licensed to Los Angeles, California, United States, which formerly used the call sign KPOL-TV
- Kwajalein Polarimetric S-band Weather Radar
