= KHRR =

Television station in Tucson, Arizona

ATSC 3.0 station Semi-satellite of KTAZ, Phoenix, Arizona
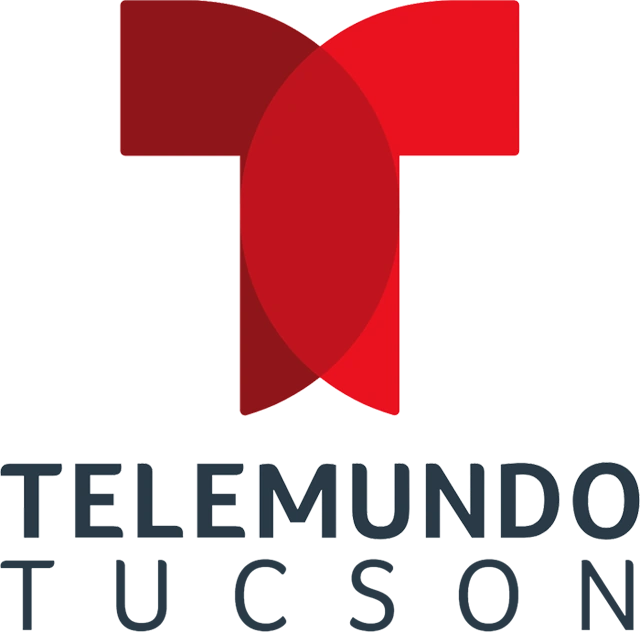
- Tucson, Arizona; United States
- Channels: Digital: 16 (UHF); Virtual: 40
- Branding: Telemundo Tucson

Programming
- Affiliations: 40.1: Telemundo; for others, see § Subchannels

Ownership
- Owner: Telemundo Station Group; (NBC Telemundo License LLC)

History
- First air date: January 5, 1985
- Former call signs: KPOL (1985–1992)
- Former channel numbers: Analog: 40 (UHF, 1985–2009); Digital: 42 (UHF, 2003–2009), 40 (UHF, 2009–2018)
- Former affiliations: Independent (1985–1989); Dark (1989−1992)
- Call sign meaning: Successor full-power station, including affiliation, to K14HR, (now KUDF-LP)

Technical information
- Licensing authority: FCC
- Facility ID: 30601
- ERP: 396 kW
- HAAT: 622 m (2,041 ft)
- Transmitter coordinates: 32°14′55.8″N 111°6′59.1″W

Links
- Public license information: Public file; LMS
- Website: www.telemundotucson.com

KHRR (channel 40) is a television station in Tucson, Arizona, United States, serving as the market's outlet for the Spanish-language network Telemundo. Owned and operated by NBCUniversal's Telemundo Station Group, the station maintains studios on North Stone Avenue in downtown Tucson, and its transmitter is located atop the Tucson Mountains.

Although identifying as a separate station in its own right, KHRR is considered a semi-satellite of KTAZ (channel 39) in Phoenix. As such, it simulcasts all Telemundo programming as provided through its parent, but airs separate commercial inserts and legal identifications, and has its own website. Local newscasts, produced by KTAZ and branded as Noticiero Telemundo Arizona, are simulcast on both stations. Although KHRR maintains its own facilities, master control and most internal operations are based at KTAZ's studios on South 33rd Place in Phoenix.

== History ==
=== KPOL ===
On November 28, 1983, a construction permit was granted to JP Communications, owned by Julius Polan of Chicago, for a new commercial television station on channel 40 in Tucson. Channel 40 had been occupied since November 1980 by a translator of Phoenix Spanish-language station KTVW. JP beat out Valle Verde Broadcasting Corporation, which proposed a full-service Spanish-language outlet, and five other applicants, including Focus Broadcasting and National Group Telecommunications. The permit was approved after JP paid out a cash settlement to rival Sunwest Communications.

Taking the call letters KPOL, construction began in 1984, forcing the KTVW translator to move to channel 52. The station also secured a package of Phoenix Suns road games. However, channel 40 missed its planned November start because its studios had not been completed. Meanwhile, minority investor David Jácome sued, saying that Polan had brought him in to add a minority owner to the ownership group but that he had been squeezed out.

KPOL signed on January 5, 1985. It was the second new independent station for Tucson in the same week. Just days prior, the Roman Catholic Diocese of Tucson had put KDTU channel 18 on the air; the two new outlets brought Tucson from one independent station to three, which sent costs for syndicated programming soaring. It turned out that Polan thought KDTU would not be as commercial a station as it was, and the diocese had not planned for another competitor. Initially, channel 40 broadcast in the evening hours only.

After its first year, KPOL had mostly shown up as Tucson's third-rated independent and was losing money. By 1988, both of the UHF startups were in poor financial condition: at KDTU, the Diocese of Tucson had instituted three waves of job cuts in two years. The market had more stations than it could bear. The diocese had announced it would shut down KDTU before Clear Channel Communications stepped in to buy channel 18 in February 1989.

KPOL finally succumbed to its financial woes on October 17, 1989, when the station announced it would go off air at midnight. In its final days, the station was selling ads for $10 and $15, and it had stopped subscribing to ratings services.

The license remained active, and Polan engaged a broker to market channel 40 to potential bidders. JP Communications filed for bankruptcy in February 1990, with $35,000 in assets and $2.65 million in liabilities.

=== KHRR ===
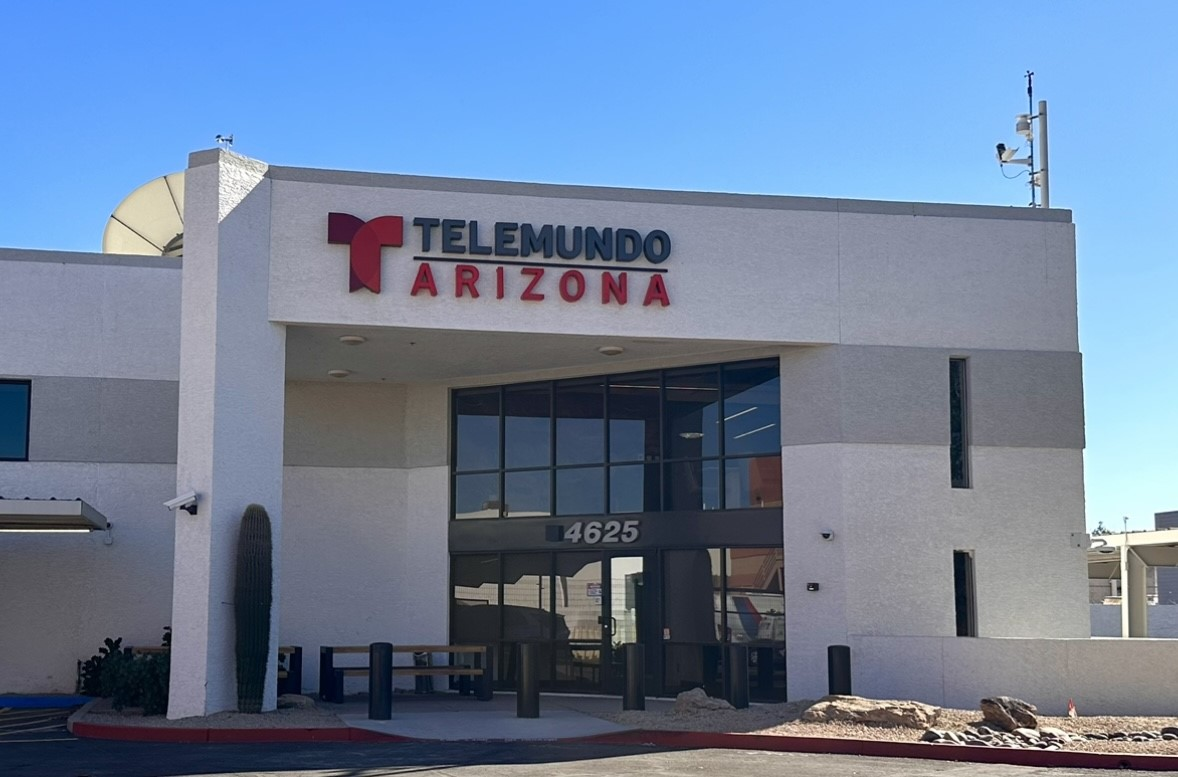
KHRR and Phoenix sister station KTAZ Channel 39 share studio space at the Telemundo Arizona facilities in South Phoenix

In 1991, local Tucson businessman Jay S. Zucker purchased the dormant KPOL license out of bankruptcy for $45,000. Zucker already owned K14HR "KHR-TV", the low-power Telemundo affiliate. On July 1, 1992, channel 40 signed on as KHRR, K14HR's full-power replacement. In addition to Telemundo programming, the station also broadcast some programs from Telemax, the state network of the Mexican state of Sonora. Zucker sold his broadcasting holdings in 1999 to The Apogee Companies, who maintained the Telemundo affiliation.

KHRR became a Telemundo O&O in 2002, along with KDRX-CA (later KDPH-LD). The two stations maintained a sister relationship, sharing their newscasts and programming stations, yet with each station based out of its own city of license. The arrangement continued until a 2006 station swap relocated Telemundo O&O KPHZ to Phoenix, Arizona, where it became KTAZ, and Daystar O&O KDTP to Holbrook, Arizona. The deal also transferred KDRX-CA to Daystar, where it became KDTP-CA.

In 2007, a restructuring plan by parent company NBC Universal, called "NBCU 2.0", moved the KHRR and KTAZ newscasts to the Telemundo News Hub in Dallas, along with news operations of other Telemundo stations in the West.

== Technical information ==
=== Subchannels ===
The station's ATSC 1.0 channels are carried on the multiplexed signals of other Tucson television stations:

Subchannels provided by KHRR (ATSC 1.0)
Subchannel	Res.	Short name	Programming	ATSC 1.0 host
40.1	1080i	KHRR-DT	Telemundo	KUAT-TV/KUAS-TV
40.2	480i	Exitos	TeleXitos (4:3)	KUAT-TV/KUAS-TV
40.3	480i	NBC LX	NBC True CRMZ	KVOA
40.4	480i	Oxygen	Oxygen (4:3)	KOLD-TV

In their Sixth Report and Order, dated April 3, 1997, proposing a digital television table of allotments, the FCC allocated UHF channel 41 for the KHRR-DT operations. However, by February 1998, the DTV Table of Allotments had been changed to specify channel 42 for KHRR-DT. KHRR applied for DTV facilities to broadcast at 303 kW in October 1999, and eventually amended the ERP to 411.5 kW in February 2002. In May 2003, in order to meet an FCC deadline for having a digital television station operational, KHRR requested special temporary authority (STA) to operate at 12.7 kW, which the FCC granted the following month. After delays due to coordination with the Mexican government, interference issues, and the sale of the station from the Apogee Companies to NBC Telemundo, by June 2006, the station was still operating under their STA facilities, the STA having been extended several times. Having to meet another FCC deadline to have fully operational facilities by June 30, 2006, KHRR requested to make their STA facilities permanent. The FCC granted the request on July 10, 2006, and the next day, KHRR applied for a license to cover their facilities, from which they were already broadcasting. The FCC granted the license on January 31, 2007.

=== Analog-to-digital conversion ===
KHRR discontinued regular programming on its analog signal, over UHF channel 40, on June 12, 2009, as part of the federally mandated from analog to digital television. The station's digital signal relocated from its pre-transition UHF channel 42 to channel 40.

=== ATSC 3.0 ===
Subchannels of KHRR (ATSC 3.0)
Subchannel	Res.	Short name	Programming
4.1	1080p	KVOA-NG	NBC (KVOA)
6.1	1080p	KUAT-NG	PBS (KUAT-TV)
9.1	1080p	KGUN-NG	ABC (KGUN-TV)
11.1	1080p	KMSB-NG	Fox (KMSB)
13.1	1080p	KOLD-NG	CBS (KOLD-TV)
40.1	1080p	KHRR-NG	Telemundo

Subchannel broadcast with digital rights management
