= KMEE-TV =

Television station in Kingman, Arizona

KMEE-TV and K32PG-D
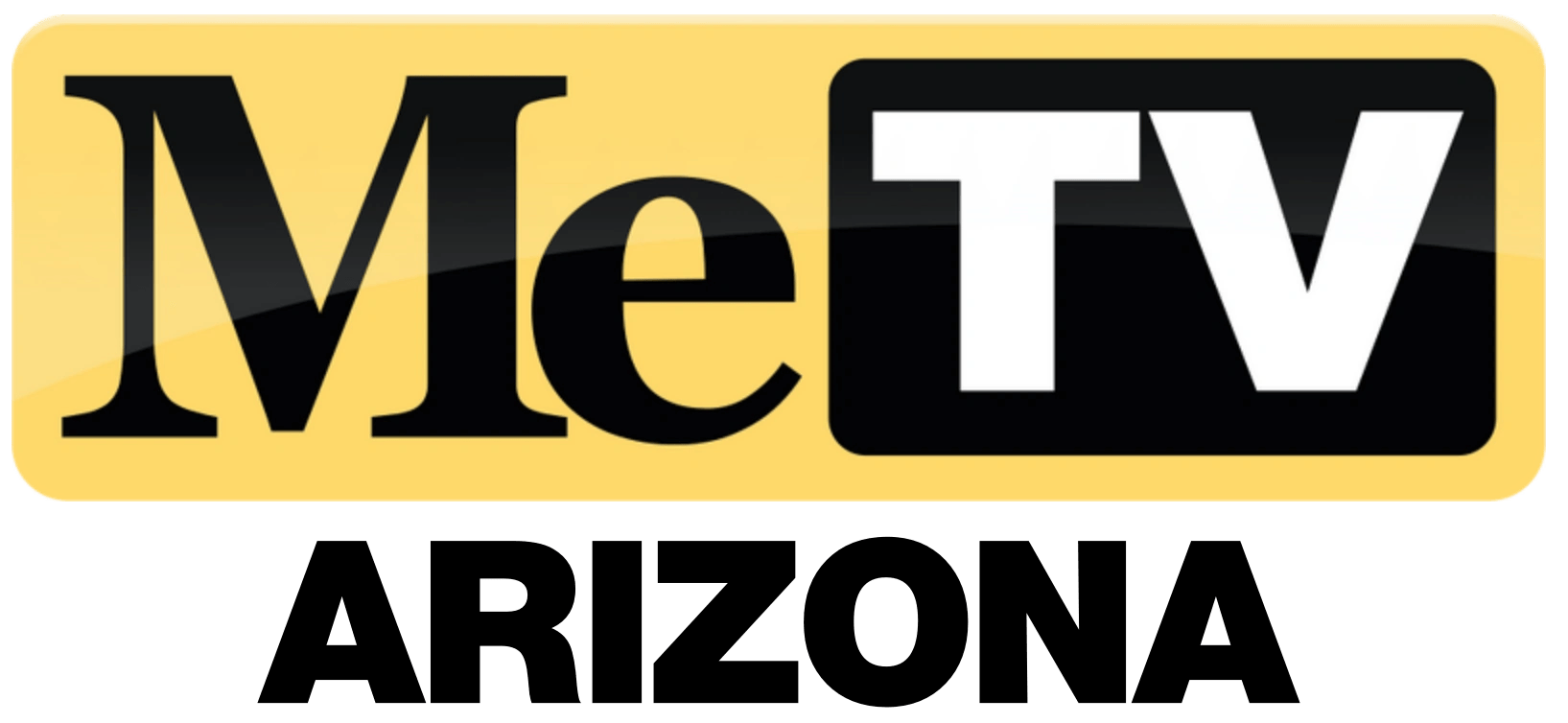

KMEE-TV: Kingman, Arizona; K32PG-D: Phoenix, Arizona; United States
- Channels for KMEE-TV: Digital: 19 (UHF); Virtual: 6
- Channels for K32PG-D: Digital: 32 (UHF); Virtual: 40
- Branding: MeTV Arizona

Programming
- Affiliations: 6.1/40.1: MeTV; 6.2/40.2: MeTV+; for others, see § Technical information and subchannels

Ownership
- Owner: Weigel Broadcasting; (KMOH-TV LLC/KEJR-LD LLC)

History
- Founded: K32PG-D: June 5, 1992
- First air date: KMEE-TV: February 22, 1988 (Note: The Broadcasting and Cable Yearbook says February 22, while the Television and Cable Factbook says February 26.); K32PG-D: August 22, 1995
- Former call signs: KMEE-TV: KMOH-TV (1988–2025); K32PG-D: K31DI (1992–2001); K43GV (2001–March 2005); KQBN-LP (March–November 2005); KEJR-LP (November 2005–2010); KEJR-LD (2010–2025); KMEE-LD (2025–2026)
- Former channel number: KMEE-TV: Analog: 6 (VHF, 1988–2009); K32PG-D: Analog: 31 (UHF, 1992–2000), 43 (UHF, 2000–2010); Digital: 40 (UHF, 2010–2019)
- Former affiliations: KMEE-TV: NBC (as satellite of KNAZ-TV, 1988–1989); Independent (1989–1995); The WB (1995–1999); NBC (as satellite of KPNX, 1999–2004); Spanish independent (2004–2006); Tr3́s (2006–2012); MundoFox/MundoMax (2012–2016); América TeVé (2016–2018); Azteca América (2018−2021); K32PG-D: Telemundo (via KDRX-CA, 2001–March 2005); Almavision (March–November 2005); Spanish independent (November 2005–2006); Tr3́s (2006–2012); MundoFox/MundoMax (2012–2016); América TeVé (2016–2018); Azteca América (2018–2022); MeTV+ (2023–2025, now on 40.2)
- Call sign meaning: MeTV (primary affiliation)

Technical information
- Licensing authority: FCC
- Facility ID: KMEE-TV: 24753; K32PG-D: 168349
- Class: K32PG-D: LD
- ERP: KMEE-TV: 25.2 kW; K32PG-D: 15 kW
- HAAT: KMEE-TV: 578.2 m (1,897 ft); K32PG-D: 468.5 m (1,537 ft)
- Transmitter coordinates: KMEE-TV: 35°1′56.7″N 114°21′58.9″W; K32PG-D: 33°19′57″N 112°3′59″W

Links
- Public license information: KMEE-TV: Public file; LMS; K32PG-D: Public file; LMS

KMEE-TV (channel 6) is a television station in Kingman, Arizona, United States, airing programming from MeTV. Owned by Weigel Broadcasting, the station has studios on Kingman Avenue in Kingman, and its transmitter is located atop Oatman Mountain, near Oatman, Arizona. It is rebroadcast into the Phoenix metropolitan area by translator K32PG-D (channel 40), with transmitter atop South Mountain.

== History ==
An original construction permit to build a television station on VHF channel 6 in Kingman granted to Grand Canyon Television Company on April 8, 1985. Grand Canyon was one of four firms to apply and the only one from Arizona; Its transmitter facilities were to be located at Hualapai Peak, operating at an effective radiated power (ERP) of 10 kW. The permit was modified in August 1986 to specify Black Mountain as the transmitter location with an ERP of 100 kW, which was the maximum allowed for a low-band VHF station. The tower was erected in January 1988, after winter weather forced delays, The station first signed on the air on February 22, 1988, as KMOH-TV (for Mohave County), and was licensed on June 1.

During the late 1980s and early 1990s, KMOH varied in programming. It initially consisted of a near-complete simulcast of Grand Canyon Television Company's other station, KNAZ-TV in Flagstaff, an NBC affiliate; the station had an office in Kingman, and Mohave County news was inserted into the KNAZ-TV local newscasts. The inserts were four minutes in length, though Grand Canyon planned to originate a full half-hour of news for KMOH. By April 1989, KMOH had become an independent station with sports, movies, and syndicated programming. In November 1990, the station shuttered the Kingman office and began originating its news from Flagstaff, just four months after going to 30-minute local newscasts at 6 and 10 p.m.

The station moved its headquarters from Kingman to Bullhead City in March 1991 and lost its spot on Kingman's cable system for months; it planned to begin rebroadcasting NBC programs from KVBC in Las Vegas but remained with much the same programming. The Bullhead City studios had belonged to a former low-power operation, "KBUL".

In September 1995, KMOH became an affiliate of The WB. It was listed as an American Independent Network (AIN) affiliate in July 1996, and was also listed as a Network One (N1) affiliate in 1997. KMOH was still primarily a WB affiliate in May 1997, when the broadcasting arm of the Gannett Company (now Tegna Inc.) bought the station, along with KNAZ-TV in Flagstaff, from Grand Canyon Television Company. In November 1999, Gannett converted KMOH into a satellite station of Phoenix-based NBC affiliate KPNX (channel 12). It was perceived as a redundant move, as KPNX was already available on cable in the Kingman area.

In August 2004, Bela Broadcasting, looking to expand the reach of its family-oriented Spanish-language format, acquired KMOH from Gannett, making the station a Spanish-language independent station, airing mostly the same content as sister station KBEH in Oxnard, California, but on a different schedule. From Kingman, Bela hoped to put signals into the Phoenix and Las Vegas markets, both of which have large Hispanic populations. While it cannot be verified as a reason for buying KMOH, a full-power station in the Phoenix media market, it is clear that Bela Broadcasting desired must-carry cable coverage in Phoenix as well. With KMOH no longer a rebroadcaster of KPNX, Cox Communications petitioned the Federal Communications Commission (FCC) to allow it to exclude the station from must-carry provisions in its 16 Phoenix-area communities, since, while it is part of the Phoenix market, it operates 165 miles (266 km) away from the city itself and the station's signal did not reach into Phoenix. KMOH fought the exclusion, but lost, in large part due to the station's lack of local programming directed at Phoenix viewers, and also in part due to not being receivable in Phoenix. In November 2005, Bela Broadcasting acquired KQBN-LP (channel 43, now KEJR-LP) from Una Vez Más Holdings, and made it a translator station of KMOH-TV, giving the station a translator in Phoenix. As Phoenix is the much larger market, both stations were branded as "KEJR 43 Phoenix" instead of as "KMOH 6".

logo as MundoFox, 2012–2015

On November 27, 2006, Bela dropped the Spanish independent format from all of its stations and made them affiliates of MTV Tr3́s. Bela Broadcasting sold KMOH and KEJR to Hero Broadcasting in January 2008. KMOH and KEJR became charter affiliates of the MundoFox Spanish-language network when it launched on August 1, 2012, replacing Tr3́s. MundoFox changed its name to MundoMax in 2015, and shut down on December 1, 2016; KMOH-TV and KEJR-LD then switched affiliations to América TeVé. HC2 Holdings agreed to acquire KMOH-TV and KEJR-LD from Hero Broadcasting on December 29, 2017; the sale was completed on June 18, 2018. HC2 replaced América TeVé programming with Azteca América, which was also owned by HC2.

In December 2020, HC2 sold KMOH-TV and KEJR-LD, along with two other stations, to Weigel Broadcasting, owner of (or managing partner in) five diginets. MeTV was placed on KMOH 6.1 on February 13, 2021.

KMOH-TV changed its call letters to KMEE-TV on September 29, 2025, with KEJR-LD changing to KMEE-LD on the same day. At the same time, KMEE-LD took over the MeTV affiliation for the Phoenix area. Prior to then, the affiliation was held by KAZT-TV with KMOH-LD broadcasting MeTV on an unlisted subchannel, as its status as a translator meant it was required to broadcast the channel.

=== K32PG-D history pre-2005 ===
Raul Infante Jr. was granted an original construction permit for a television station on UHF channel 31, which was assigned the callsign K31DI, on June 5, 1992, and licensed on August 22, 1995. The original transmitter site was in Sun City. Early programming is unknown.

In June 1998, Infante sold the station to Hispanic Television of Phoenix, who in turn sold it to Television Apogeo de Phoenix in October. In 1999, the FCC granted Fox owned-and-operated station KSAZ-TV (channel 10) permission to build its digital signal on channel 31; as a result, K31DI was forced to move to another channel. Television Apogeo took the station silent in March 2000, but returned it to the air in October, when the company was granted special temporary authority to operate on channel 43. Television Apogeo licensed the station on channel 43 with new call letters, K43GV, in December 2001. By this time, it was simulcasting Telemundo programming from KDRX-CA (now KDPH-LP).

Una Vez Más Holdings acquired the station in January 2004 and applied to move the transmitter location from Sun City to South Mountain in Phoenix. The permit was granted and the new facilities were licensed in October 2005. Meanwhile, Una Vez Más resurrected a set of call letters the company had used for its station in Tucson, and renamed the station KQBN-LP in March 2005. Telemundo programming was also replaced by the Spanish-language Christian network Almavision.

Even before the station was licensed at its new South Mountain transmitter site, Una Vez Mas sold the station to Bela Broadcasting, with the transaction finalized in November 2005. Upon taking ownership, Bela again changed the call letters, this time to KEJR-LP, and made the station a translator for KMOH-TV.

== Technical information and subchannels ==
KMEE-TV is broadcast from a main transmitter atop Oatman Mountain, near Oatman, Arizona. The K32PG-D transmitter is located atop South Mountain on the south side of Phoenix. The stations' signals are multiplexed:

Subchannels of KMEE-TV and K32PG-D
Subchannel		Res.	Short name	Programming
KMEE-TV	K32PG-D	Res.	Short name	Programming
6.1	40.1	720p	MeTV	MeTV
6.2	40.2	480i	MeTV+	MeTV+
6.3	40.3	480i	STORY	Story Television
6.4	40.4	480i	TOONS	MeTV Toons
6.5	40.5	480i	WEST	WEST

=== Analog-to-digital conversion ===
KMEE-TV (as KMOH-TV) shut down its analog signal, over VHF channel 6, on June 12, 2009, the official date on which full-power television stations in the United States transitioned from analog to digital broadcasts under federal mandate. The station's digital signal remained on its pre-transition UHF channel 19, using virtual channel 6.
