= KFTU-DT =

Television station in Douglas, Arizona

- Douglas–Tucson, Arizona; United States
- City: Douglas, Arizona
- Channels: Digital: 36 (UHF); Virtual: 3
- Branding: UniMás Arizona

Programming
- Affiliations: 3.1: UniMás; 3.2: Univision

Ownership
- Owner: TelevisaUnivision; (UniMas Partnership of Douglas)
- Sister stations: KUVE-DT

History
- First air date: June 20, 2001
- Former call signs: KBGF (2001–2002); KFTU (2002–2003); KFTU-TV (2004–2009)
- Former channel numbers: Analog: 3 (VHF, (2001–2009)
- Former affiliations: Independent (2001–2002)
- Call sign meaning: TeleFutura (former name of UniMás); TeleFutura Tucson

Technical information
- Licensing authority: FCC
- Facility ID: 81441
- ERP: 5 kW
- HAAT: 685 m (2,247 ft)
- Transmitter coordinates: 31°28′55.3″N 109°57′34.2″W
- Translator(s): KFTU-CD 34 (18 UHF) Tucson; KUVE-DT 46.2 (34.2 UHF) Green Valley; KUVE-CD 42.2 (36.2 UHF) Tucson

Links
- Public license information: Public file; LMS

KFTU-DT (channel 3) is a television station licensed to Douglas, Arizona, United States, serving as the Tucson market's outlet for the Spanish-language network UniMás. It is owned and operated by TelevisaUnivision alongside Green Valley–licensed Univision outlet KUVE-DT (channel 46). The two stations share studios on Forbes Boulevard in Tucson; KFTU's transmitter is located on Juniper Flats Road northwest of Bisbee.

KFTU-CD (channel 34) is a low-power, Class A television station licensed to Tucson that rebroadcasts KFTU-DT's signal to the city, as KFTU's coverage area falls well short of Tucson proper. KFTU-DT is also rebroadcast on KUVE-DT's second digital subchannel in order to reach the entire market; this signal can be seen on channel 46.2 from a transmitter atop Mount Bigelow. Likewise, KUVE is rebroadcast on KFTU's second digital subchannel. Master control and most internal operations for KFTU-DT and KUVE are based at the facilities of sister station KTVW-DT on 30th Street in southern Phoenix.

Like its sister station KFPH-DT (channel 13) in Flagstaff, KFTU brands itself as UniMás Arizona.

== History ==
=== KFTU-DT ===
The station was granted its original construction permit on April 8, 1998, and took the call letters KBGF in June 1998. Initially owned by Winstar Broadcasting Corp. of New York City, it was sold in December 1999 to Douglas Broadcasting, a subsidiary of Equity Broadcasting of Little Rock, Arkansas. Douglas Broadcasting completed building the station and filed for a license to cover the construction permit in April 2001. At the same time, they took KBGF on the air under Program Test Authority as an independent station. In October 2001, Douglas Broadcasting sold the station to Univision, who changed its call letters to KFTU in January 2002 to coincide with the launch of its new network, Telefutura (now UniMás), and added the "-TV" suffix two years later (after the end of analog broadcasting in June 2009, KFTU and all other Univision-owned stations switched to the "-DT" suffix). The station obtained its license to cover construction on February 4, 2004, after nearly three years operating under Program Test Authority.

=== KFTU-CD ===
City of license	Callsign	Channel	ERP	HAAT	Facility ID	Transmitter coordinates
Tucson	KFTU-CD	34	15 kW	1,075.1 m (3,527 ft)	53004	32°24′54″N 110°42′57.9″W

KFTU-CD began with an original construction permit granted on August 26, 1991, to Ponyland Broadcasting (later Venture Technologies Group) for a low-power television station to serve Tucson on UHF channel 25 with the callsign K25EA. Delays building the station caused the permit to lapse and the FCC to delete the callsign in 1993, but the station was restored and came on the air in August 1994, with the initial license granted August 29, 1994. The station changed its callsign to KTAZ-LP (for Tucson, Arizona) on December 18, 1996. In April 2001, Venture Technologies sold the station to Douglas Broadcasting, who, in turn, sold the station to Univision in September 2001. After the Telefutura network launched in January 2002, Univision dropped the station's Home Shopping Network affiliation in favor of its new network. About the same time, KTAZ was granted Class A status, and changed its call letters to KTAZ-CA on March 1, 2002. KTAZ found itself displaced when Fox affiliate KMSB (channel 11) neared launch of its digital television station on UHF channel 25, and in May 2002, applied to move to UHF channel 34. The application was granted in June, and by December 2002, the station was at its new broadcast channel. Univision changed the station's call letters to KFTU-CA on November 6, 2004, establishing brand identity with its principal station in Douglas. The station's call sign was changed again on March 19, 2012, concurrent with its transition to digital broadcasting.

The KTAZ call letters would resurface in Phoenix in 2006, when the Telemundo station there began branding itself as Telemundo Arizona.

== Technical information ==
=== Subchannels ===
The station's signal is multiplexed:

Subchannels of KFTU-DT
Subchannel	Res.	Short name	Programming
3.1	1080i	KFTU-DT	UniMás
3.2	1080i	KUVE-HD	Univision (KUVE-DT)

Simulcast of subchannels of another station

=== Analog-to-digital conversion ===
Because it was granted an original construction permit after the Federal Communications Commission (FCC) finalized the DTV allotment plan on April 21, 1997, the station did not receive a companion channel for a digital television station. Instead, on June 12, 2009, which was the end of the digital TV conversion period for full-service stations, KFTU-TV was required to turn off its analog signal and turn on its digital signal (called a "flash-cut").

However, since its analog channel position was in the low-VHF range (channels 2–6), KFTU-DT was allowed to select a different channel to use after the conversion. KFTU-DT selected UHF channel 36 and began operations on that channel once the digital transition was complete.

KFTU-CD did not apply for a companion channel for the digital conversion; as a low-power television station, it was exempt from the 2009 analog shutdown. The station was issued a digital license to cover on March 19, 2012.

=== Former translator ===
KFTU-DT previously had another repeater station in Tucson, K48GX (analog channel 48), that provided over-the-air coverage to areas to the northwest of Tucson that are shielded by terrain from the KFTU-CD signal. Univision surrendered the license for K48GX to the FCC on June 5, 2015, and it was cancelled on June 8.
