= KDPH-LD =

Television station in Phoenix, Arizona

- Phoenix, Arizona; United States
- Channels: Digital: 13 (VHF); Virtual: 48

Programming
- Affiliations: 48.1: Daystar; 48.2: Daystar Español; 48.3: Daystar Reflections

Ownership
- Owner: Daystar Television Network; (Word of God Fellowship, Inc.)

History
- Founded: August 23, 1989
- Former call signs: K64DR (1989–1996); KDRX-LP (1996–2003); KDRX-CA (2003–2006); KDTP-CA (2006–2008); K48LK (2008)
- Former affiliations: Telemundo (1989–2006)
- Call sign meaning: Daystar Phoenix

Technical information
- Licensing authority: FCC
- Facility ID: 168565
- Class: LD
- ERP: 3 kW
- HAAT: 470.9 m (1,545 ft)
- Transmitter coordinates: 33°20′4″N 112°3′44″W

Links
- Public license information: LMS
- Website: daystar.com

KDPH-LD (channel 48) is a low-power television station in Phoenix, Arizona, United States, owned by the Daystar Television Network. The station's transmitter is located atop South Mountain on the city's south side.

Daystar's presence in Phoenix dates to 2000, but the low-power license began in 1989 as the first Telemundo affiliate for Phoenix, originally on channel 64. Despite being a low-power station, the station, later known as KDRX-LP and KDRX-CA, produced local news programming. In 2002, Telemundo itself acquired KDRX and the co-owned Telemundo station in Tucson, KHRR. Telemundo and Daystar agreed in 2005 to an unusual license and facility swap; Telemundo traded a full-power station in Holbrook, Arizona, KPHZ, and the low-power channel 48 for its full-power KDTP (channel 39), which was accompanied by the redesignation of channel 39 for commercial use. This allowed Telemundo to compete more effectively with Univision in Phoenix when Telemundo moved to channel 39 as KTAZ in July 2006.

== History ==
An original construction permit for low-power television station K64DR (channel 64) was granted to Broadcasting Systems, Inc. on August 23, 1989. It was the second channel 64 construction permit in Phoenix; the first was owned by KNIX-FM (102.5) and dropped when the FCC decided to add a full-power channel 61 allocation to Phoenix, posing potential interference problems were it and channel 64 to both be built. The station was quickly built and was licensed on October 31, just two months later. It was affiliated with Telemundo and aired very little local programming. In December 1990, the station was sold to Hispanic Broadcasters of Arizona, Inc., which owned Tucson Telemundo affiliate "KHR" (later KHRR). Channel 64 grew quickly: it had 19 local staff by 1995, even though Cox Cable carried the national feed instead. After low-power TV stations were allowed to adopt four-letter call signs, K64DR (frequently known as "KDR") became KDRX-LP.

In October 1997, KDRX-LP added a Spanish-language newscast produced locally by ABC affiliate KNXV-TV (channel 15). The station began producing its own newscast a few years later after moving into KNXV's former Phoenix studio facility.

The station was sold to Apogeo Television Phoenix LLC in 1999 and moved to channel 48 in 2000, improving over-the-air reception. KDRX became a Class A television station a year later when that class of station was approved by the FCC. The locally produced newscast and the move to in-core channel 48 helped it to qualify for the new status, giving KDRX primary station protection during the digital conversion of full-service stations and guaranteeing it an opportunity to upgrade to digital TV. In December 2002, NBC acquired KDRX-LP and KHRR for $19 million apiece, making them part of the Telemundo-owned stations division.

Telemundo in Phoenix was up against one of the country's most dominant Univision outlets, full-powered KTVW. In 2005, Univision cornered 89% of the Spanish-language ratings in Phoenix, which was the last major market where it enjoyed such an advantage. In order to compete, Telemundo owner NBC Universal reasoned, the station needed to upgrade to a full-power signal. Thus, NBC filed an application with the FCC to move the license of full-power NBC/Telemundo–owned KPHZ (now KTAZ) from Holbrook channel 11 to Phoenix channel 39. In exchange, Daystar-owned station KDTP would move from Phoenix channel 39 to Holbrook channel 11, and KDRX-CA would be transferred to Daystar in order to keep a Daystar Television Network outlet in Phoenix. The request involved not only a swap of licenses but also non-commercial reservations in Phoenix and Holbrook, plus the two low-powered stations (KPHZ-LP on channel 58—later KDTP-LP—would be added to the deal later); in October 2005, the FCC agreed to the proposal, over the objection of Univision, citing the compelling public interest benefit of equal competition in Spanish-language television in Phoenix. The switch of programming occurred on July 23, 2006. Ahead of the switch, KDRX-CA became KDTP-CA before downgrading to a low-power non-Class A station, initially K48LK and later KDPH-LP, in early 2008. KDTP-LP ceased broadcasting on December 31, 2011; as a digital station, KDPH-LD continued to broadcast a 58.1 subchannel of Jewelry Television, the former programming of KDTP-LP, until late 2022.

== Subchannels ==
The station's signal is multiplexed:

Subchannels of KDPH-LD
| Subchannel | Res. | Short name | Programming |
|---|---|---|---|
| 48.1 | 1080i | KDPH-LD | Daystar |
| 48.2 | 720p | ESPANOL | Daystar Español |
| 48.3 | 480i | REFLECT | Daystar Reflections |
