= KWJB (Arizona) =

Radio station in Globe, Arizona (1938–1960, 1969–1975)

KWJB was the call sign for several radio stations in Globe, Arizona. Two separate licenses on 1240 kHz, and an FM station on 100.3 MHz, used the call letters. The first KWJB signed on in 1938, being joined by the FM station in 1958. After going silent October 29, 1960, the licenses of both stations were ordered revoked by the Federal Communications Commission (FCC) in 1961 along with all other stations owned by Gila Broadcasting. A second AM station in Globe on the same frequency, but a different license, operated as KWJB between 1969 and 1975.

== History ==
=== Original KWJB ===
The Sims Broadcasting Company put KWJB on the air in the summer of 1938, broadcasting on 1210 kHz. In 1939, KWJB joined KTAR's Arizona Broadcasting Company (ABC) network as part of the latter's expansion from two stations to five. Broadcasting initially as a daytime-only station, it was approved for unlimited operation in October 1939 with 250 watts. In March 1940, the station relocated to new studios in downtown Globe. The station moved to 1240 with NARBA reallocation in 1941, and Sims sold the station in 1943 to the Gila Broadcasting Company, owned by Safford theater owner Louis F. Long.

Even though KWJB was an affiliate of KTAR's ABC chain, and KTAR and three other stations in the seven-station network were NBC affiliates, it would not be until March 1, 1944, that KWJB would join NBC. Eight months later, the station suffered a tower collapse when a gust of wind brought the structure down during the replacement of its guy wires. The studios and transmitter were relocated again in 1949 to a new building on U.S. 60-70. In December 1951, disc jockey Robert Hawkins resigned to take a post with musicians Les Paul and Mary Ford.

KWJB was approved in 1953 to build a cable television system to provide reception of Phoenix stations received at Pinal Peak in the Globe-Miami area. Four years later, Gila filed with the FCC to build a TV station on channel 34 at Globe. The application was withdrawn in a contentious battle with the Community TV Project, which sought to build television translators for Globe and complained that the channel 34 application was made "as a subterfuge" to keep the translators away; Gila said that its proposed station could not coexist with translators of Phoenix stations. By the time the TV station was filed, Gila also held the construction permit for the first FM station in Gila County, KWJB-FM 100.3, which signed on in 1958. The callsign had been assigned in November 1956.

=== Change to KZOW and Gila closure ===
However, the two stations would not last long into the 1960s. In March, the Federal Communications Commission ordered Gila to state why their license renewal applications, covering KZOW/KWJB-FM and its four sister stations, should not be designated for hearing. The commission charged that a management contract between Gila and Radio Associates, Inc., had allowed the latter company to assume complete control of the stations; that the company had misstated the ownership of its president, Louis F. Long, in the broadcaster; and a breach of contract in which Globe station manager Willard Shoecraft and his wife had paid in an option agreement to buy three stations, which was then broken when Gila sought to sell all of them to the Earl Perrin Co. of Chicago. The FCC also alleged that some Gila stations had refused to join the CONELRAD civil defense system, an accusation denied by Gila, which stated that it had installed the system at great difficulty due to the remote location of the stations. In April 1960, KWJB became KZOW, call letters that would be used for the final six months of its existence.

On October 15, 1960, at a hearing in Phoenix, Gila asked the FCC to approve the renewal of the Gila stations' license and their sale to Perrin. The stations went dark on October 29 despite the FCC denying Gila's request to take them silent, with Gila citing the fact that nervous employees fearing for their futures were already leaving their jobs and the company's financial state for the closures. In denying the request, the FCC warned that the affected communities had no other radio stations.

In August 1962, Arizona radio station owner Carleton W. Morris asked for FCC permission to set up new stations using the Gila facilities, having paid $100,000 for their equipment. The call letters were canceled on January 17, 1963, and 1240 AM remained silent for most of the rest of the decade. (100.3 remained silent for almost 20 years until a new KIKO-FM signed on in October 1980.)

=== Second KWJB/KPPR ===
James Mace applied in 1969 to build a radio station on the 1240 allocation in Globe left vacant by KWJB. This new station took the callsign KWJB on March 22, 1969, and went on the air later in the year. The station went silent in June 1975 after being sold to James H. Adams-owned Broadcasters Inc. for $52,500. The station returned to the air on August 6 with a country format. After the sale, however, KWJB was beset by technical problems that prompted the station to place newspaper advertising apologizing to listeners. The new station applied for the call letters KPPR, a nod to Globe's copper mining heritage, and received them in November 1975.

KPPR folded sometime between 1975 and 1978. Mace then made an application in December 1977, mutually exclusive with the renewal of the KPPR license, for 1240 kHz. That application was granted in 1980 and went on the air as KGJM, becoming today's KJAA.
