= Anne Ryman =

American journalist

Anne Ryman is an American journalist. In 2018, she won a George Polk Award, and was part of a team that won a Pulitzer Prize. She won a Rocky Mountain Emmy Award in 2023 for a story about Willem de Kooning's stolen Woman-Ochre.

== Life ==
Ryman was a senior reporter at The Arizona Reporter. She is currently a reporter with ABC 15 Arizona.
