= KQMR =

Radio station in Globe, Arizona

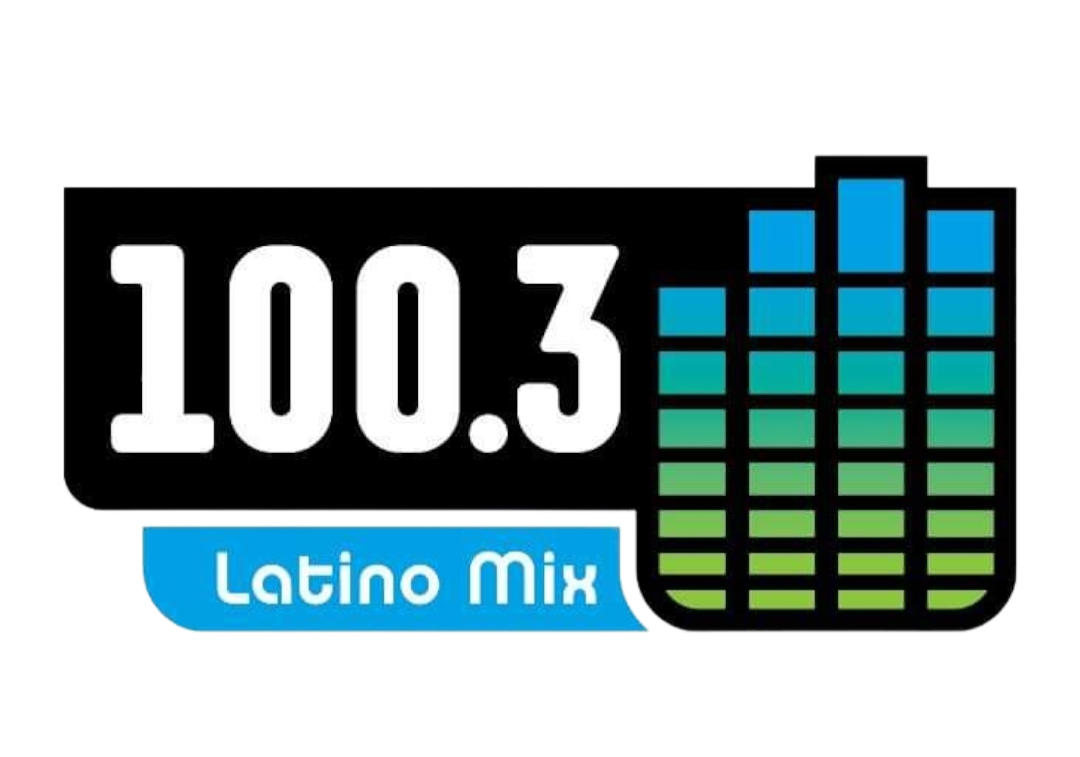
- Globe, Arizona; United States
- Broadcast area: Phoenix, Arizona
- Frequency: 100.3 MHz (HD Radio)
- Branding: Latino Mix 100.3

Programming
- Language: Spanish
- Format: Contemporary hit radio

Ownership
- Owner: Uforia Audio Network; (Univision Radio Illinois, Inc.)
- Sister stations: KOMR, KQBU-FM, KHOT-FM; Television stations KTVW-DT & KFPH-DT

History
- First air date: October 1980 (as KIKO-FM)
- Former call signs: KIKO-FM (1980–1986); KEYX (1986–1988); KGRX (1988–1992); KZRX (1992–1995); KHOT-FM (1995–1998); KDDJ (1998–2001); KMRR (2001–2005)
- Call sign meaning: Derived from Amor format

Technical information
- Licensing authority: FCC
- Facility ID: 22977
- Class: C
- ERP: 90,000 watts
- HAAT: 624 meters (2,047 ft)
- Transmitter coordinates: 33°17′23″N 110°51′53″W

Links
- Public license information: Public file; LMS
- Webcast: Listen live
- Website: KQMR Online

KQMR (100.3 FM) is a radio station in Globe, Arizona, United States, owned by TelevisaUnivision and licensed to Univision Radio Illinois, Inc. The station was assigned the KQMR call sign by the U.S. Federal Communications Commission (FCC) on September 16, 2005. It airs a Spanish language Latin pop music format.

== History ==
100.3 signed on the weekend of October 18–19, 1980, as KIKO-FM, owned by Willard "Willy" Shoecraft alongside KIKO, who began operating his FM station from a ridge above Globe (the east end used by the local two-way users). KIKO-FM reactivated the 100.3 frequency, which had been dormant since Gila Broadcasting and its KWJB-FM ceased operations on October 29, 1960.

100.3 ran 30,000 watts from a transmitter site 3,700 feet (1,100 m) above average terrain. In the late 1980s, it was decided that the station would be able to reduce height and increase power toward the 100,000 limit allowed for the class of the station. A site on the west side of the ridge required new roads and special construction. The site was miles from commercial power, and no power lines were available. The transmitter went on air with locally generated power.

The power increase also made it possible for the frequency to target the Phoenix market. In 1986, Shoecraft sold KIKO-AM-FM to KeyCom Inc., which relaunched the FM station as KEYX "Key 103", an "uptempo rock and soul" station emphasizing new songs, in July of that year. Key 103 lasted 18 months, being blown up and replaced with KGRX in 1988. KGRX's format consisted of heavily instrumental acoustic, light jazz and new age music.

The format changed again when KGRX became active rock station KZRX in 1991, under veteran programmer Guy Giuliano. KZRX was a hard rock format, which was at the height of its success in 1992–1993. The station went head to head with KUPD, with high-profile jocks like Madd Maxx Hammer, The G-Ster, Jan Williams, Dangerous Dave Olson, KC Kennedy, Larry Mac, Rob Trygg, Tracy Lea and many other veteran KUPD jocks. On-air slogans included "Get Hard", "Arizona's Rockradio Superstation", "Arizona's Hardest", and "Z-Rock" in its first year.

KZRX dropped hard rock for hot talk in early 1995, and applied for the letters KHOT-FM, adding Howard Stern, who was also on KGME. The hot talk format failed to gain either an audience or advertising revenue, and by July, KHOT-FM was simulcasting sister alternative rock station KEDJ, with Stern taking over morning drive at the combined station. The station its call sign to KDDJ in 1998, while the KHOT-FM call sign moved to co-owned 105.9 FM.

Logo as Recuerdo

In 2001, Hispanic Broadcasting Corporation acquired KDDJ-KEDJ and changed it to a Spanish-language adult contemporary station called "Amor" with new call signs, KQMR and KOMR. In October 2005, Univision made adjustments to the "Amor" format, making it more oldies-driven, and changed the name to "Recuerdo".

On September 3, 2010, at 4:30 pm, KQMR 100.3 broke from 106.3's Recuerdo format and flipped to Latin pop as "La Kalle".

On January 2, 2013, KQMR began simulcasting on KHOV-FM 105.1 FM in Wickenburg, Arizona, which covers the West Valley. This simulcast ended in December 2016, when KHOV-FM moved to 105.1 and began carrying Univision Deportes Radio.

On September 28, 2014, KQMR rebranded as "100.3 Latino Mix".

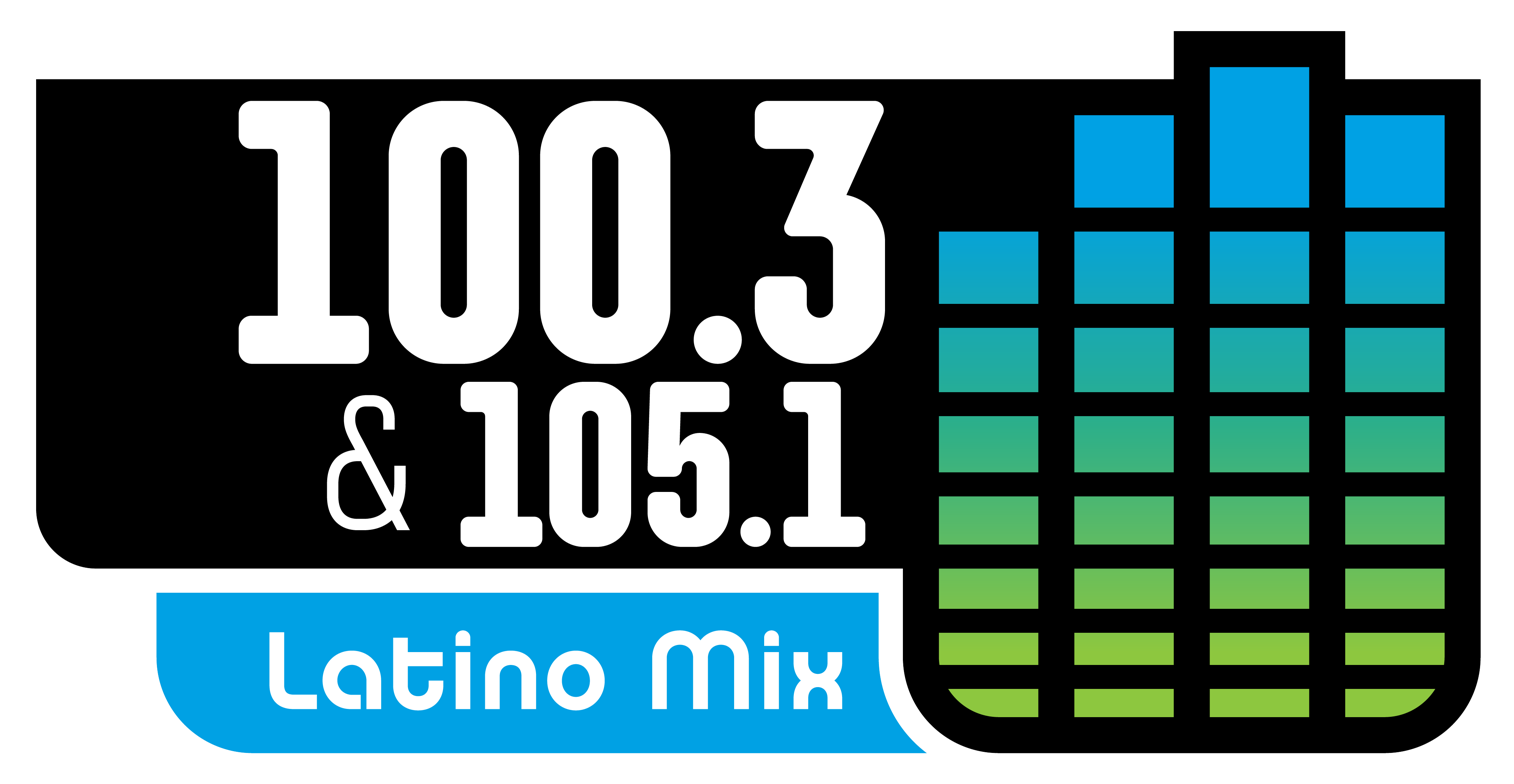
Logo while simulcasting KHOV-FM

On January 15, 2021, KHOV 105.1 was switched back to simulcast KQMR 100.3 covering the west valley once again in the phoenix area.

On May 24, 2023, KQMR ended its simulcast with KHOV-FM for the second time when KHOV-FM simulcasted with former partner KHOT-FM to carry the "Que Buena" format with its simulcast partner. After the simulcast switch, KQMR rebranded as Latino Mix 100.3.
