= KFPH-DT =

Television station in Flagstaff, Arizona

- Flagstaff, Arizona; United States
- Channels: Digital: 13 (VHF); Virtual: 13
- Branding: UniMás Arizona

Programming
- Affiliations: 13.1: UniMás; 13.2: Univision; for others, see § Subchannels

Ownership
- Owner: TelevisaUnivision; (UniMas Partnership of Flagstaff)
- Sister stations: KTVW-DT, KHOT-FM, KOMR

History
- First air date: December 31, 1991
- Former call signs: KKTM (1992–1995); KWBF (1995–1998); KBPX (1998–2001); KDUO (2001–2002); KFPH (2002–2003); KFPH-TV (2004–2009)
- Former channel numbers: Analog: 13 (VHF, 1992–2008); Digital: 27 (UHF, 2002–2009)
- Former affiliations: Independent (1992–1995); The WB (1995–1996); inTV (1996–1998); Pax TV (1998–2001); ACN (2001–2002)
- Call sign meaning: "Telefutura Phoenix"

Technical information
- Licensing authority: FCC
- Facility ID: 41517
- ERP: 33 kW
- HAAT: 475.5 m (1,560 ft)
- Transmitter coordinates: 34°58′5.8″N 111°30′36.1″W
- Translator(s): KTVW-DT 33.2 Phoenix; KFPH-CD 35.1 (UHF) Phoenix

Links
- Public license information: Public file; LMS
- Website: UniMás

KFPH-DT (channel 13), branded UniMás Arizona, is a television station licensed to Flagstaff, Arizona, United States, broadcasting the Spanish-language UniMás network to northern and central Arizona. It is owned and operated by TelevisaUnivision alongside Phoenix-based Univision outlet KTVW-DT (channel 33). Most operations are run from KTVW-DT's studios on 30th Street in Phoenix, though Univision operates a news bureau and sales office on North Fourth Street in Flagstaff. The KFPH-DT transmitter is located atop Mormon Mountain, about 20 miles (32 km) south of Flagstaff in the Coconino National Forest.

Since the main KFPH signal falls well short of reaching Phoenix proper, it operates KFPH-CD (channel 35) as a full-time satellite in Phoenix. That station converted to an ATSC 3.0 station in 2018, though its subchannels were distributed onto other Phoenix stations for transmission. Additionally, KFPH's primary channel is carried on a KTVW subchannel.

Channel 13 in Flagstaff received a construction permit in October 1984, but seven years and a sale passed before the station began broadcasting as KKTM on December 31, 1991. KKTM operated as a local independent station for the Flagstaff area and became an affiliate of The WB in 1995 as KWBF. However, the sale of the station to an affiliate of Paxson Communications Corporation in 1996 heralded its conversion to infomercial programming and, beginning in 1998, the company's new Pax TV network as KBPX. KBPX was paired with a translator to provide the network in Phoenix until KPPX-TV (channel 51) was completed in 1999. Two years later, Pax sold KBPX to Equity Broadcasting Corporation, which briefly programmed home shopping programming until Univision purchased the station as part of its then-new Telefutura network, today's UniMás.

== History ==
In 1984, two groups—Minority Television of Flagstaff and Ware Communications—filed for construction permits to build a new television station on channel 13 in Flagstaff. Minority Television was granted the construction permit on October 27, and the station took the call sign KKTM. A year later, Michael Gelfand, a doctor from Bethesda, Maryland, acquired the construction permit from Minority Television principal Katherine T. Mansfield.

Construction work began in August 1991. Meanwhile, to make way for KKTM to begin testing, a translator for Phoenix station KTSP-TV moved to the UHF band. Studio space was also secured in the Greenlaw Village shopping center on Fourth Street.

KKTM began broadcasting at half power from Mormon Mountain on December 31, 1991. Most of its programming came from two services primarily used by low-power stations, Channel America and Main Street TV. The station also produced several local programs, including a newscast and a country music show taped at Flagstaff's Redwood Inn. The newscast ceased production in June 1994.

KKTM became a charter affiliate of The WB when it launched on January 11, 1995, and changed its call sign to KWBF. However, Gelfand decided he did not have sufficient resources to support the station economically; in September, he agreed to sell KWBF for $1.4 million to Christian Network, Inc., an affiliated company to Paxson Communications Corporation that had been co-founded by Bud Paxson. Christian Network then transferred its stations to Paxson Communications in May 1996.

Paxson Communications launched its Pax TV network on August 31, 1998. The station began airing the new service and was given the new call sign of KBPX; the network's intended Phoenix station, KPPX-TV, was not ready to launch. However, a translator on channel 67 rebroadcast the station in Phoenix. KPPX-TV ultimately debuted on February 15, 1999.

In March 2001, Paxson Communications sold two of its stations—KBPX and WPXS in Mount Vernon, Illinois—to Equity Broadcasting Corporation of Little Rock, Arkansas, for $17.75 million; Paxson retained the KBPX call letters. The call sign was changed to KDUO on June 21, 2001, and the station switched to broadcasting the home shopping service America's Collectibles Network (now Jewelry Television). Equity also owned KOND-LP (channel 35), a Phoenix low-power station that began broadcasting KDUO's programming. Nearly immediately, Equity sold KDUO along with KBGF in Douglas, Arizona, and three low-power TV stations to Univision for $19.1 million in August. The newly acquired stations became Telefutura's stations in Arizona, with KDUO changing call signs to KFPH.

== Technical information ==
=== Subchannels ===
The station's signal is multiplexed:

Subchannels of KFPH-DT
Subchannel	Res.	Short name	Programming
13.1	720p	KFPH-DT	UniMás
13.2	720p	KTVW-HD	Univision (KTVW-DT)
13.3	480i	getTV	Great (4:3)

Simulcast of subchannels of another station

=== Analog-to-digital conversion ===
KFPH-TV shut down its analog signal, over VHF channel 13, on September 18, 2008, citing a lack of space at its transmitter site to accommodate the analog transmitter, its digital channel 27 transmitter, and the new digital channel 13 transmitter; additionally, winter weather conditions rendered it impossible to perform work during the last 90 days before the conclusion of the digital transition. The station's digital signal relocated from its pre-transition UHF channel 27 to VHF channel 13.
