= KHOT-FM =

Radio station in Paradise Valley, Arizona

Coordinates: 33.588°N 111.761°W

- Paradise Valley, Arizona; United States
- Broadcast area: Phoenix, Arizona
- Frequency: 105.9 MHz
- Branding: Qué Buena 105.9

Programming
- Format: Regional Mexican

Ownership
- Owner: Uforia Audio Network; (Univision Radio Illinois, Inc.)
- Sister stations: KFPH-DT; KQBU-FM; KOMR; KQMR; KTVW-DT

History
- First air date: July 19, 1996
- Former call signs: KXLL (1992–1996); KBUQ (1996–1998)
- Call sign meaning: "Hot" (former brand and reference to Phoenix's extreme climate)

Technical information
- Licensing authority: FCC
- Facility ID: 59422
- Class: C2
- ERP: 36,000 watts
- HAAT: 176 meters (577 ft)
- Repeater: 105.1 KQBU-FM (Wickenburg) 105.9 KHOT-FM1 (Glendale)

Links
- Public license information: Public file; LMS
- Webcast: Listen live
- Website: univision.com/arizona/khot

KHOT-FM (105.9 MHz) is a commercial radio station licensed to Paradise Valley, Arizona, United States, and serving the Phoenix metropolitan area. Owned by TelevisaUnivision, it airs a regional Mexican format, calling itself "Que Buena 105.9."

KHOT-FM has an effective radiated power of 36,000 watts. It also transmits on a 7,000-watt booster station (KHOT-FM1) at 105.9 FM in Glendale. Programming is simulcast on KQBU-FM at 105.1 MHz in Wickenburg.

== History ==
=== KXLL/KBUQ ===
The station signed on the air on July 19, 1996. It carried a country music format known as "Young Buck Country". Before the station was on the air, the call sign was KXLL. The call sign was changed shortly after sign-on to KBUQ to complement the "Young Buck Country" branding.

Attempts to put this station on the air had been ongoing for years prior to the 1996 sign-on. It was originally owned by Scottsdale Talking Machine and Wireless Co., Inc., and its primary quandary was where to put a tower in one of the Valley's richest areas. The new station desired to place its tower on Mummy Mountain, which met with aesthetic challenges. At one point, it proposed covering its antenna and tower in a fiberglass housing designed to look like a cactus, which was rejected by residents. The station ultimately signed on from a tower in Fountain Hills.

=== KHOT-FM ===
On October 10, 1997, the format changed to urban adult contemporary, known as "Hot 105.9". The station then changed its call sign to KHOT-FM, which moved from 100.3 FM in 1997. At that time, the station was owned by New Century Arizona Broadcasting.

KHOT-FM dropped most of its current R&B hits to focus more on a rhythmic oldies direction, playing mostly 1970s and 1980s R&B and Disco, which most similarly-formatted stations at that time were doing. In 1999, KHOT-FM was sold to Hispanic Broadcasting Corporation and flipped to its current format on April 5 of that year. The 105.3 frequency was added in 2001, creating a simulcast.

KHOT-FM during this time carried Piolín Por La Mañana ("Tweety in the Morning"), hosted by Eddie "Piolín" Sotelo. The program originated from Los Angeles-based sister station KSCA and was popular among Spanish-speaking Hispanics in Phoenix. Univision Radio dismissed Piolín in 2013.

The PM drive show is known as El Show Del Gatillero Del La Tarde.

Logo before simulcasting on KHOV-FM

In March 2016, KHOT-FM rebranded as "Qué Buena 105.9".

On May 24, 2023, KHOT-FM simulcasted with former simulcast partner KHOV-FM, which beforehand simulcasted with Latin Pop sister station KQMR, and rebranded as "Qué Buena 105.9 y 105.1". Both of these stations have full coverage of the Phoenix area, with KHOV-FM covering the western parts or areas of Phoenix, while KHOT-FM covers most of the Greater Phoenix area and its eastern parts.

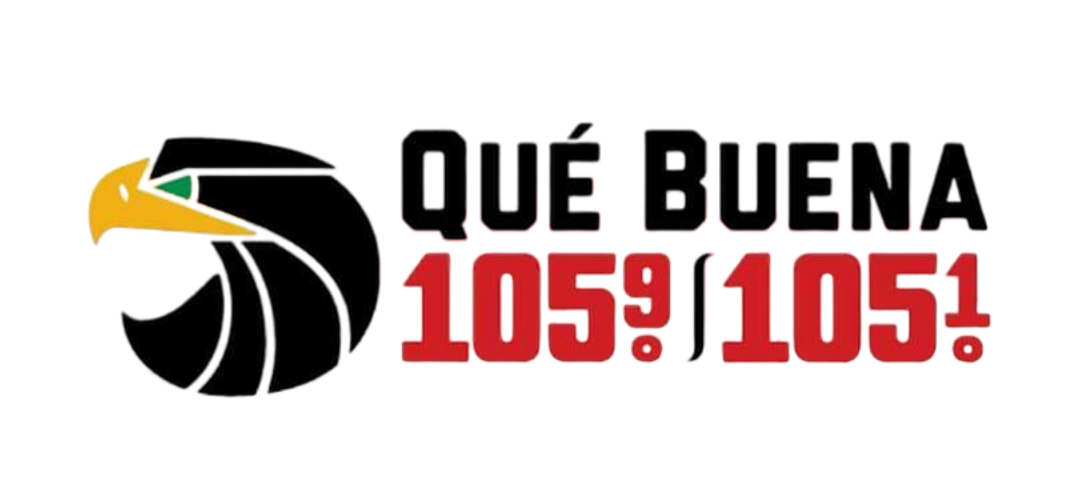
Logo while simulcasting on KQBU-FM from 2023 to 2026
