= KQBU-FM =

Radio station in Wickenburg, Arizona, United States

- Wickenburg, Arizona; United States
- Broadcast area: Phoenix metropolitan area
- Frequency: 105.1 MHz
- Branding: TUDN Phoenix 105.1

Programming
- Language: Spanish
- Format: Sports radio
- Affiliations: TUDN Radio

Ownership
- Owner: Uforia Audio Network; (Univision Radio Illinois, Inc.)
- Sister stations: KQMR; KOMR; KHOT-FM

History
- First air date: December 3, 1982
- Former call signs: KHBC (1982–1987); KCIW-FM (1987–1989); KTIM-FM (1989–1990); KRDS-FM (1990–1997); KMYL-FM (1997–2000); KSSL (2000–2001); KHOV-FM (2001-2026)
- Former frequencies: 105.5 MHz (1982–1989); 105.3 MHz (1989–2016)
- Call sign meaning: Qué Buena

Technical information
- Licensing authority: FCC
- Facility ID: 29021
- Class: C1
- ERP: 46,000 watts
- HAAT: 410 meters (1,350 ft)
- Transmitter coordinates: 34°11′32″N 112°45′13″W

Links
- Public license information: Public file; LMS
- Webcast: Listen live
- Website: TUDN Phoenix Online

KQBU-FM is a radio station on 105.1 MHz in Wickenburg, Arizona, serving the Phoenix metropolitan area. It is owned by TelevisaUnivision through its Uforia brand playing the TUDN Radio sports format.

== History ==
KQBU-FM began in 1983 with the callsign KHBC, broadcasting at 105.5 MHz and named for initial owners Hassayampa Broadcasting Corporation. On January 1, 1987, it became KCIW-FM, the FM counterpart to sister station KCIW (1250 AM). The country music format of the station continued in 1989 with a callsign change to KRDS-FM. In 1990, KRDS-FM changed formats to contemporary Christian. KRDS-FM moved from 105.5 to 105.3 MHz and increased its signal from a class A to class B. On March 21, 1997, the format was changed to adult standards with a change of call sign to KMYL-FM to complement their "Music of Your Life" slogan and simulcast of KMYL (1190 AM). In 2000, it switched to Spanish hits. In 2001, the station was acquired by Hispanic Broadcasting Corporation, and flipped to a simulcast of KHOT-FM, and swtiched its call sign to KHOV-FM to match its sister station. On January 2, 2013, KHOV-FM switched from a simulcast with KHOT-FM to a simulcast with KQMR, in order to provide coverage of its "La Kalle" Latin pop format in the West Valley. On September 28, 2014, KQMR/KHOV-FM rebranded as "100.3 Latino Mix".

In 2016, KHOV-FM applied for an FCC construction permit to move to 105.1 MHz, increase its effective radiated power to 46,000 watts and decrease its height above average terrain to 410 meters (1,350 ft). KHOV-FM began transmitting from these upgraded facilities on October 20, 2016.

On December 20, 2016, Univision announced that KHOV-FM would soon split from its simulcast and become one of the charter affiliates of Univision Deportes Radio, its new Spanish-language sports network launched in April 2017. The station began to air games of the Arizona Cardinals, Phoenix Suns and Arizona Diamondbacks professional teams. On July 20, 2019, Univision Deportes Radio rebranded as TUDN Radio.

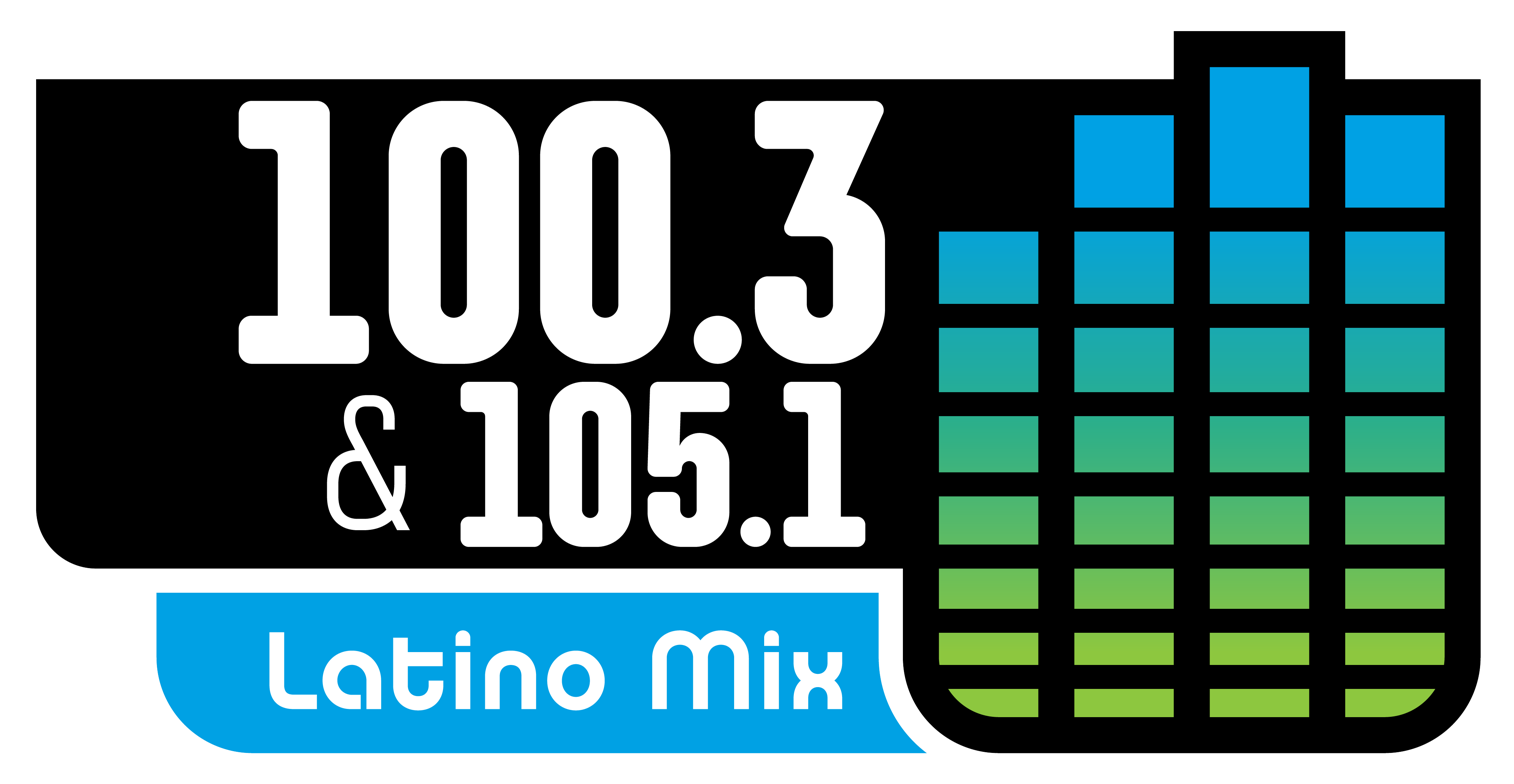
Logo simulcasting KQMR

In January 2021, KHOV-FM returned to simulcasting KQMR's Latin pop format. It split from the simulcast to air Arizona Diamondbacks games.

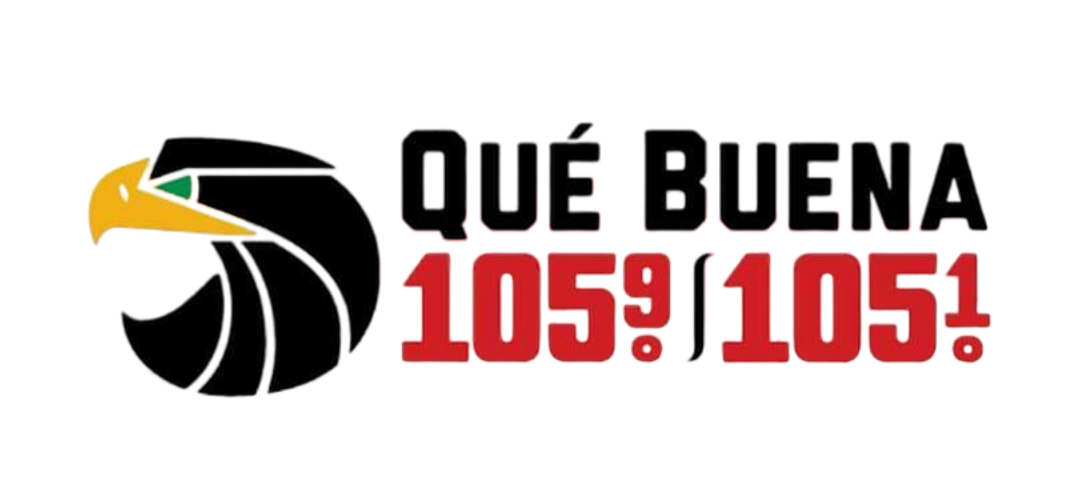
Logo simulcasting KHOT-FM

On May 24, 2023, KHOV-FM split its simulcast with KQMR, and resumed simulcasting KHOT-FM as "Qué Buena 105.9 y 105.1". The two stations provided full coverage of the Phoenix area, with this station covering the western parts of Phoenix. The KQBU-FM call sign was moved here from 107.1 MHz in Benbrook, Texas, on July 25, 2026. The KHOT-FM simulcast ended on August 2, 2026, with KQBU-FM returning to TUDN Radio.
