= KOMR =

Radio station in Sun City, Arizona, United States

- Sun City, Arizona; United States
- Broadcast area: Phoenix metropolitan area
- Frequency: 106.3 MHz
- Branding: Amor 106.3

Programming
- Language: Spanish
- Format: Spanish AC

Ownership
- Owner: Uforia Audio Network; (Univision Radio Illinois, Inc.)
- Sister stations: KFPH-DT; KHOT-FM; KQBU-FM; KQMR; KTVW-DT

History
- First air date: March 7, 1975
- Former call signs: KWAO (1975–1983); KMZK (1983–1986); KONC (1986–1993); KEDJ (1993–2001)
- Call sign meaning: From "Amor"

Technical information
- Licensing authority: FCC
- Facility ID: 55913
- Class: C2
- ERP: 23,000 watts
- HAAT: 221 meters (725 ft)
- Transmitter coordinates: 33.956°N 112.477°W

Links
- Public license information: Public file; LMS
- Webcast: Listen live
- Website: www.univision.com/radio/arizona-komr-fm

KOMR (106.3 FM) is a commercial radio station licensed to Sun City, Arizona, United States, and serving the Phoenix metropolitan area. It is owned by Univision, and it airs a Spanish adult contemporary format, calling itself "Amor 106.3". The studios are on South 30th Street in Phoenix.

KOMR is a Class C2 station with an effective radiated power (ERP) of 23,000 watts. The transmitter is off North Castle Hot Springs Road in Morristown near Peoria.

== History ==
The first attempt of a radio station on 106.3 FM in Sun City was KTPM, which was on the air for less than seven months after signing on June 13, 1962. It was co-owned with Wickenburg's KAKA by Lowell Beer and Paul Mullenix. However, the station was one of the quickest failures in Arizona radio history; it went temporarily silent on January 2, 1963, never to return; the Beer-Mullenix licenses were placed into receivership in June and never reemerged.

The current KOMR signed on in 1975 as KWAO (broadcasting with a new license from the tower of defunct KTPM), targeting listeners in Sun City with an easy listening format. The station was sold in 1983 to Larry Mazursky's Canyon Communications Corporation, relaunching as contemporary KMZK "Muzik 106". The station later flipped to classical.

In late 1985, Mazursky sold 1360 AM KLFF, a big band station, to Affiliated Broadcasting, the new owners of KONC, the classical station in Phoenix. A condition of the sale required low-rated KMZK to vacate the classical format, and KMZK became a country station. That would prove short-lived when, in March 1986, Affiliated flipped KONC and changed that station to adult contemporary KAMJ; while Affiliated's acquisition of KFLR AM 1230 for classical music languished, Mazursky announced plans to revert KMZK to classical music, prompting Affiliated to ditch its own classical plans. In addition, KMZK became KONC. Throughout the 1980s, KONC was used on an electronic program guide on United Cable.

KONC dropped classical music in January 1993, being replaced by modern rock/alternative KEDJ, known as "The Edge." That left Phoenix without a classical station for three months, when KBAQ 89.5 signed on the air as a public station. The station upgraded to a class C2 after another station was moved from 106.3 in Arizona City, AZ to 106.5 in the late 1990s.

In 2001, Hispanic Broadcasting Corporation (a predecessor to Univision Radio) acquired the station and flipped the station to a Spanish-language adult contemporary station called "Amor", simulcasting with KKMR and KQMR. Moments after the format change, the owners of 103.9 FM, which was then Rhythmic Contemporary Hit Radio KPTY, purchased the rights to the KEDJ format (minus the contract to air Howard Stern's syndicated program, which had been on 106.3 and 100.3) and call letters, as well as the Edge moniker. Three callsign changes in 15 days followed until 106.3 became KOMR, which was previously held by a defunct radio station in St. Louis, Missouri.

In October 2005, Univision made adjustments to the "Amor" format, making it more oldies-driven, and changed the name to "Recuerdo".

On February 6, 2018, Univision dropped the "Más Variedad" Spanish Adult Hits format and switched it to Spanish AC as Amor 106.3. Although the music and radio shows are syndicated and heard from KBRG in San Jose and KRDA in Fresno simultaneously, which also carries the Amor format. The “Amor” stations are similar to KLVE in Los Angeles which is one of the most listened Spanish language radio stations in the United States.
