= KNXV-TV =

Television station in Phoenix, Arizona

- Phoenix, Arizona; United States
- Channels: Digital: 15 (UHF); Virtual: 15
- Branding: ABC 15 Arizona; ABC 15 News

Programming
- Affiliations: 15.1: ABC; for others, see § Technical information and subchannels

Ownership
- Owner: E. W. Scripps Company; (Scripps Broadcasting Holdings LLC)
- Sister stations: KASW

History
- First air date: September 9, 1979
- Former channel numbers: Analog: 15 (UHF, 1979–2009); Digital: 56 (UHF, 2000–2009)
- Former affiliations: Independent (1979–1986, 1994–1995); ON TV (1979–1983); Fox (1986–1994); ABC (secondary, 1994–1995); The CW (15.2, 2023–2024)
- Call sign meaning: Intended original "Newswatch" format; XV is the Roman numeral for 15

Technical information
- Licensing authority: FCC
- Facility ID: 59440
- ERP: 550 kW
- HAAT: 544.2 m (1,785 ft)
- Transmitter coordinates: 33°20′3.2″N 112°3′40.5″W
- Translator(s): see § Translators

Links
- Public license information: Public file; LMS
- Website: abc15.com

KNXV-TV (channel 15) is a television station in Phoenix, Arizona, United States, affiliated with ABC. It was established in 1979 as the Phoenix area's second independent station with part-time subscription television programming from ON TV. It was originally owned by the New Television Corporation, which had attempted to set up the station for nearly five years prior to its launch. In 1985, Scripps-Howard Broadcasting, the broadcast division of the E. W. Scripps Company, acquired KNXV-TV. Channel 15 affiliated with Fox in 1986 and became the leading independent in the market, and one of Fox's strongest affiliates. In 1994, Fox announced a multi-city affiliation agreement with New World Communications which included Phoenix's then-CBS affiliate, KSAZ-TV, and mostly CBS affiliates in several other major markets. CBS expressed interest in affiliating with Scripps's ABC affiliates in other cities and Scripps used this as leverage to force ABC to move its Phoenix affiliation from market leader KTVK to KNXV-TV beginning in January 1995.

The station was in the process of organizing a local newsroom when the switch was announced and aired its first newscast on August 1, 1994; News 15 received critical acclaim in its early years but sank in ratings and quality in the late 1990s and early 2000s. The news department recovered, expanding the number of local newscasts it produced, and has since received three George Foster Peabody Awards. In 2019, Scripps acquired a second Phoenix station, KASW (channel 61), which was the CW affiliate for Phoenix. The CW affiliation briefly moved to a subchannel of KNXV-TV to allow channel 61 to air Arizona Coyotes hockey games. The two stations share studios on 44th Street on Phoenix's east side; KNXV-TV's transmitter is located atop South Mountain. Its signal is relayed across northern Arizona through a network of low-power translators.

== History ==
=== Independent station (1979–1986) ===
In February 1975, the Federal Communications Commission (FCC) granted a construction permit to New Television Corporation to build a new ultra high frequency (UHF) television station on channel 15 in Phoenix, Arizona. The company's president was Edwin Cooperstein, who had started New Jersey's WNJU-TV in the 1960s before moving to Phoenix. New Television Corporation expected to begin broadcasting within a year and intended to place a heavy emphasis on news programming, airing three 90-minute newscasts at different times between 4 p.m. and midnight. The lone legacy of this proposed format was the station's call sign, KNXV-TV, standing for "Newswatch 15" (the "XV" stood for 15 in Roman numerals). Plans were soon delayed due to the inability to secure financing in a difficult economy, and by the end of 1976, the station had not been built. In 1977, Cooperstein and his investors sold a majority of New Television Corporation to Byron Lasky's Arlington Corporation. Lasky eventually launched or purchased three other stations: WTTO in Birmingham, Alabama; WCGV-TV in Milwaukee; and WQTV in Boston.

In late 1978, plans were made to launch the station the next year. The catalyst and financial backer was Oak Industries, which would broadcast the ON TV subscription television service in evening hours while New Television would program the station during the day as a commercial independent station, airing first-run and off-network syndicated shows and children's programs. KNXV-TV began broadcasting on September 9, 1979, more than four and a half years after the construction permit was granted. One early station promotion featured the "Bluebird of Happinews", with the voice of Elroy "Buzz" Towers (who was voiced by an early station master control and videotape operator) in an invisible sky-blue helicopter taking jabs at local news on other stations.

In Phoenix, ON TV held telecast rights at various times to ASU sports, the Phoenix Suns, Phoenix Giants minor league baseball and Los Angeles Kings hockey. By July 1982, ON TV had 39,000 subscribers in Phoenix, but sporting events and subscribers were moving from subscription television to cable. In 1981, the Suns signed a 13-year agreement to telecast games through American Cable, resulting in the launch of the Arizona Sports Programming Network; American Cable sub-licensed games to ON TV, partly because they had not yet wired all of the metropolitan area. KNXV-TV was at times uncooperative with ON TV's programming plans; the station resisted a request to expand ON TV to start before 7 p.m. on weekdays and 5 p.m. on weekends, and it threatened to stop airing ON TV's "adults only" late-night fare. ON TV sued KNXV over its refusal to cede early evening hours, which generated 60 percent of the station's revenue.

Phoenix was one of the first ON TV markets to show serious subscriber erosion. By April 1983, its subscriber base had dipped below 25,000—a drop of more than 35 percent. Oak Communications ultimately shuttered ON TV in Phoenix on May 4, 1983, resulting in the loss of 140 jobs. KNXV then became a full-time general-entertainment independent station, relying on a movie library and syndicated shows not already owned by KPHO-TV (channel 5)—the established independent in Phoenix—or the network affiliates.

=== Scripps purchase and Fox affiliation ===
After going full-time with the end of ON TV, potential buyers expressed interest in acquiring channel 15. Cooperstein rebuffed a $22 million (equivalent to $57.6 million in 2025) bid from the Tribune Company but accepted a $30 million (equivalent to $78.6 million in 2025) offer from Scripps-Howard in 1984; the sale was finalized in 1985 after Scripps was required by the FCC to divest itself of radio stations KMEO-AM-FM.

The new owner's connections showed in a program KNXV debuted shortly after the sale. In mid-1985, KNXV began producing Friday Night at the Frights starring "Edmus Scarey" (portrayed by Ed Muscare), a series of hosted B-movies. Muscare had previously hosted shows for another Scripps station, KSHB-TV in Kansas City. Stu Powell, general manager of KNXV in the mid-1980s and former KSHB-TV general manager, coaxed Muscare out of retirement to work in Phoenix. Muscare resigned in September 1986, shortly before being arrested on charges of sexual battery with a minor stemming from an incident in Florida. The station also became the over-the-air broadcaster of the Suns again; it lost the rights to televise the team's games to KUTP (channel 45) in 1988 with the figure increasing to 30 beginning in the 1990–91 season. KNXV beat out KPHO-TV and KUTP to become Phoenix's Fox affiliate at the network's inception on October 9, 1986; as Fox's first and only program was The Late Show Starring Joan Rivers, KNXV remained essentially independent. The station had a unique view of the development of the network, as general manager Powell sat on Fox's first board of governors; he would remark of the early days, "The only definition of failure at Fox at that time was not trying things."

During this period, KNXV made steady gains. By 1990, channel 15 had surpassed KPHO in total-day ratings, even though the station still produced no local newscasts, and it was regularly appearing as one of the top five Fox affiliates by ratings in the country. While KPHO attempted to woo Fox away with its existing news operation, KNXV retained the affiliation, having become by 1992 the second most successful Fox affiliate in ratings after KTXL in Sacramento, California.

=== ABC affiliate (1995–present) ===
On May 22, 1994, New World Communications signed a long-term groupwide affiliation agreement with Fox that would result in longtime CBS affiliate KSAZ-TV (channel 10), which New World was in the process of acquiring, becoming the Phoenix area's new Fox affiliate. The deal also affected the two other Fox stations owned by Scripps-Howard, KSHB-TV and WFTS-TV in Tampa. New World also owned CBS affiliates switching to Fox in Detroit and Cleveland. CBS was highly interested in moving to the successful Scripps-owned ABC affiliates—WXYZ-TV and WEWS-TV—in these markets, which ABC estimated to generate half a rating point by themselves for World News Tonight, per a declaration made by KTVK general manager Bill Miller in an FCC filing. Miller described a pressure campaign led by Scripps to coerce a reluctant ABC to switch from longtime affiliate and market leader KTVK by threatening disaffiliation in Detroit and Cleveland, having been told by ABC executive Bryce Rathbone that "Scripps has a gun to their head". Meanwhile, KNXV general manager Raymond Hunt was receiving calls congratulating him on KNXV's new CBS affiliation, even though no such deal had been made.

On June 15, 1994, ABC officially gave KNXV-TV its affiliation for Phoenix, effective January 9, 1995, and agreed to affiliate with Scripps-owned stations in Tampa and Baltimore. KNXV was in the advanced stages of building a local news department when the affiliation switch was announced; in September 1993, the station had hired its first news director, and the station's newly hired staff of 30 had reported to Phoenix in the weeks before the New World deal was announced. As a result of the switch and the consequent demand for more newscasts, the news staff expanded to 85, and the station delayed the launch of its newscast a month to August 1. KTVK's loss of the ABC affiliation was attributed to it being a standalone, family-run operation, while Scripps held substantial clout as a major broadcast chain.

Over the second half of 1994, ABC programming migrated from KTVK to KNXV in stages as the outgoing affiliate shed a variety of its soon-to-be former network's offerings. When KTVK launched a local morning newscast at the end of August, Good Morning America was the first ABC program to move to KNXV. KNXV then picked up World News Tonight and Nightline on December 12, the day after the Fox affiliation ended. The rest of ABC's programming moved to KNXV on January 9, 1995. (Note: KNXV became the third station in Phoenix to affiliate with ABC. The network had previously affiliated with channel 10 (then known as KOOL-TV) from 1954 to 1955, when it moved to the newly launched KTVK.)

=== New studios and 2007 helicopter crash ===
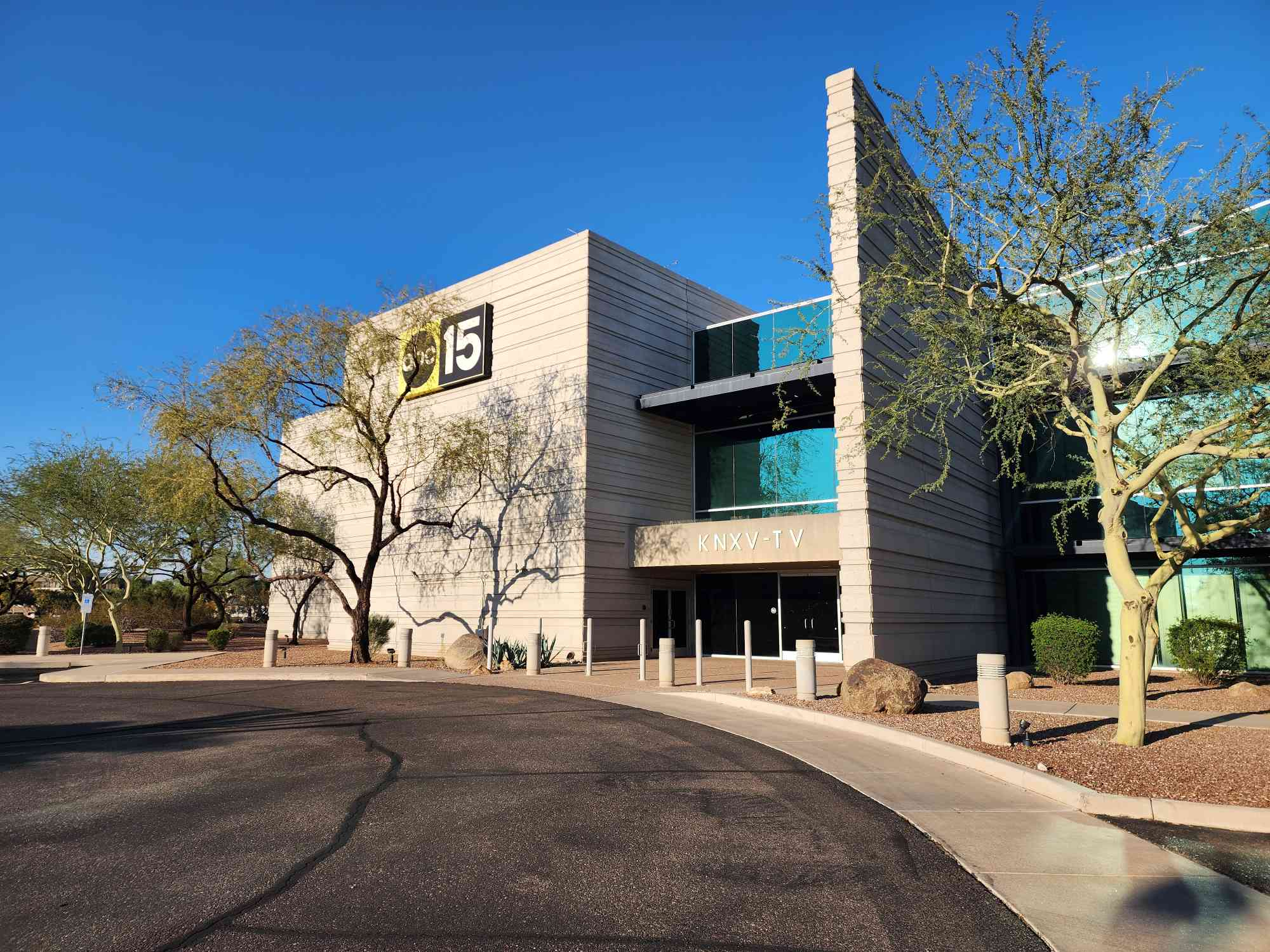
KNXV-TV's studio facility in Phoenix, opened 1999

In 1999, the station moved to a new $31 million studio facility that included two studios and a helipad; KDRX-LP, the low-power Telemundo affiliate, then acquired KNXV's former building in 2001, allowing it to start producing its own local newscasts; KNXV-TV had previously produced KDRX's first local news program in 1997. Scripps opted to centralize its advertising traffic operation at hubs in Phoenix and Tampa in 2009, choosing Phoenix as one of its westernmost properties at the time, allowing the traffic hub to stay open later.

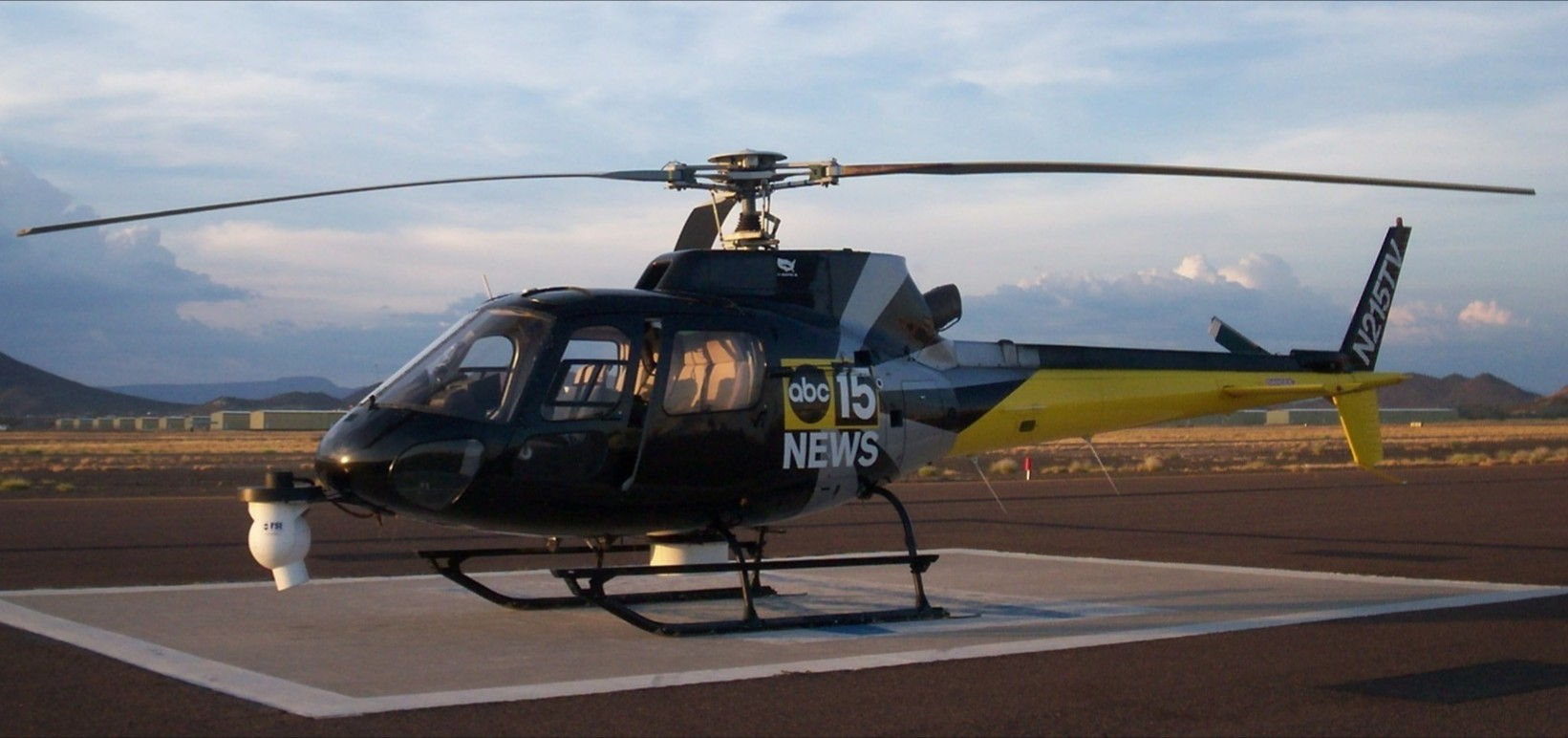
The KNXV-TV helicopter, "Air 15", destroyed in the 2007 collision

On July 27, 2007, two news helicopters leased to KNXV and KTVK collided while covering a police pursuit in downtown Phoenix. All four people on both helicopters were killed, including KNXV pilot Craig Smith and photographer Rick Krolak.

KNXV-TV shut down its analog signal, over UHF channel 15, at 12:01 a.m. on June 12, 2009, the official date on which full-power television stations in the United States transitioned from analog to digital broadcasts under federal mandate. At 2 a.m. on that date, the station's digital signal relocated from its pre-transition UHF channel 56, which was among the high-band UHF channels (52–69) that were removed from broadcasting use as a result of the transition, to its analog-era UHF channel 15.

=== Duopoly with KASW and CW affiliation shuffle ===
Scripps has since expanded its operations in Phoenix and the state. Its 2015 acquisition of Journal Communications included KGUN-TV and KWBA-TV, the ABC and CW affiliates in Tucson. On March 20, 2019, Scripps announced that it would acquire Phoenix's affiliate of The CW, KASW, and seven other stations from Nexstar Media Group as part of that company's proposed acquisition of Tribune Media. This would create a new duopoly between KNXV and KASW, the third in the Phoenix market after Fox Television Stations's KSAZ-TV/KUTP and Meredith Corporation's KPHO-TV/KTVK. The sale was approved by the FCC on September 16 and completed on September 19, 2019.

On October 5, 2023, the Arizona Coyotes announced their departure from the troubled regional sports network Bally Sports Arizona as, during its parent company's bankruptcy, the network rejected the Coyotes' contract. That same day, the team and Scripps Sports announced a new contract. As part of the deal, games would be broadcast by KNXV in Phoenix and Scripps stations in other markets. Because of network programming commitments between KNXV and KASW, most games would air on KNXV's second subchannel, which usually carries Antenna TV, though both stations would carry surrounding Coyotes team content on their main channels (such as the monthly magazine program Coyotes Insider).

Scripps announced on November 16 that The CW would move to KNXV's second subchannel as "CW 6 Arizona" beginning November 20, freeing up KASW to become an independent station and air subsequent Coyotes games. The subchannel continued to carry programming from Antenna TV in all other time periods and assumed KASW's former cable channel 6 allotment on Cox Communications in the Phoenix metro area. The affiliation lasted less than three months on KNXV 15.2; effective February 1, 2024, the network moved to KAZT-TV (channel 7) after CW owner Nexstar Media Group entered into a time brokerage agreement with KAZT-TV's owner, Londen Media Group, to program that station.

== Local programming ==
=== News operation ===
In 1993, Scripps announced that it would start a local newscast for KNXV in 1994. It had already started a 9 p.m. local newscast for one of its other Fox affiliates, KSHB-TV in Kansas City, and the proposed newscast was intended to be unconventional to match the target demographic of Fox network programming. A news director had been hired in September 1993; the set was already under construction; and anchors and staff had reported to Phoenix in the first weeks of May 1994. However, the New World deal and consequent affiliation switch to ABC occurred late in the development of the newscast. This forced Scripps to rethink both the product to go out on air and the long-term trajectory of KNXV's news department. As a result, the intended style was toned down slightly; a staff of 30 was expanded to 85; and what was once a 9 p.m. newscast slated to launch July 7 turned into a 10 p.m. newscast, News 15, that debuted on August 1, 1994. The new newscast was fast-paced with a high story count, and it was also the start of a rapid expansion to fit the needs of a Big Three affiliate. A 6 p.m. newscast soon followed, with a 5 p.m. show added in December and 6 and 11 a.m. programs in January 1995.

The founding news director, Mary Cox, soon exited; she was replaced by Susan Sullivan, who created an environment focused on enterprise and investigative reporting that employees described as "utopian". Bob Rowe, a station manager "excommunicated" by Scripps to Phoenix, was just as influential in the early years of KNXV's news operation, laying the groundwork for a "no chit-chat" approach. The resulting news product attracted increased viewership: News 15 rose as high as second place at one point. It also led to critical acclaim: in 1995, channel 15 won the most regional Emmy Award nominations for a Phoenix station. After Sullivan left the station in 1996, Michael Kronley was installed as station manager from Charlotte ABC affiliate WSOC-TV. Under Kronley, the investigative reports were discontinued and replaced by more live shots, and the station acquired a helicopter. KNXV and KPHO both adopted the slogan "Live, Local, Late Breaking", requiring KPHO to alter its version and ultimately leading KNXV to adopt a new slogan, "We won't waste your time". Under Jeff Klotzman, channel 15's fourth news director, ratings generally fell for the station's newscasts; he resigned in 1998 and was replaced by Bob Morford, whose format tended to deemphasize reporters. A 2000 Columbia Journalism Review study of local newscasts nationwide gave KNXV an "F" rating for its short stories lacking investigations and mentioned sources, though it praised the focus on local issues and geographic diversity in local news coverage. Morford defended KNXV's news format as an alternative to the longer-established newscasts that already drew frequent news watchers and noted that his station sought to attract "low-use TV news viewers".

On April 1, 2009, Scripps joined with Fox Television Stations, owner of KSAZ-TV, to form Local News Service, a model for pooling newsgathering efforts for local news events in which each station provided employees to the pool service in exchange for the sharing of video. KPHO-TV eventually joined the Phoenix LNS agreement shortly after the announcement. By 2020, all four English-language television newsrooms in Phoenix shared a helicopter.

In the 2010s, KNXV steadily expanded its news product to additional time slots. In 2012, KNXV relaunched an 11 a.m. newscast, and it added weekend morning news in 2013 and a 6:30 weeknight half-hour in 2014, among other new newscasts. After acquiring KASW, Scripps launched extended morning, midday, and 9 p.m. newscasts on that station over the course of 2020.

In the mid-2010s, KNXV also became a leader at digital news within the Scripps group, particularly under the leadership of Chris Kline, who was promoted to news director from digital director. It was the first station in the company to launch a channel on Roku, later expanded throughout the group, and the use of a "digital-first" newsroom methodology helped lead to ratings increases for channel 15's newscasts.

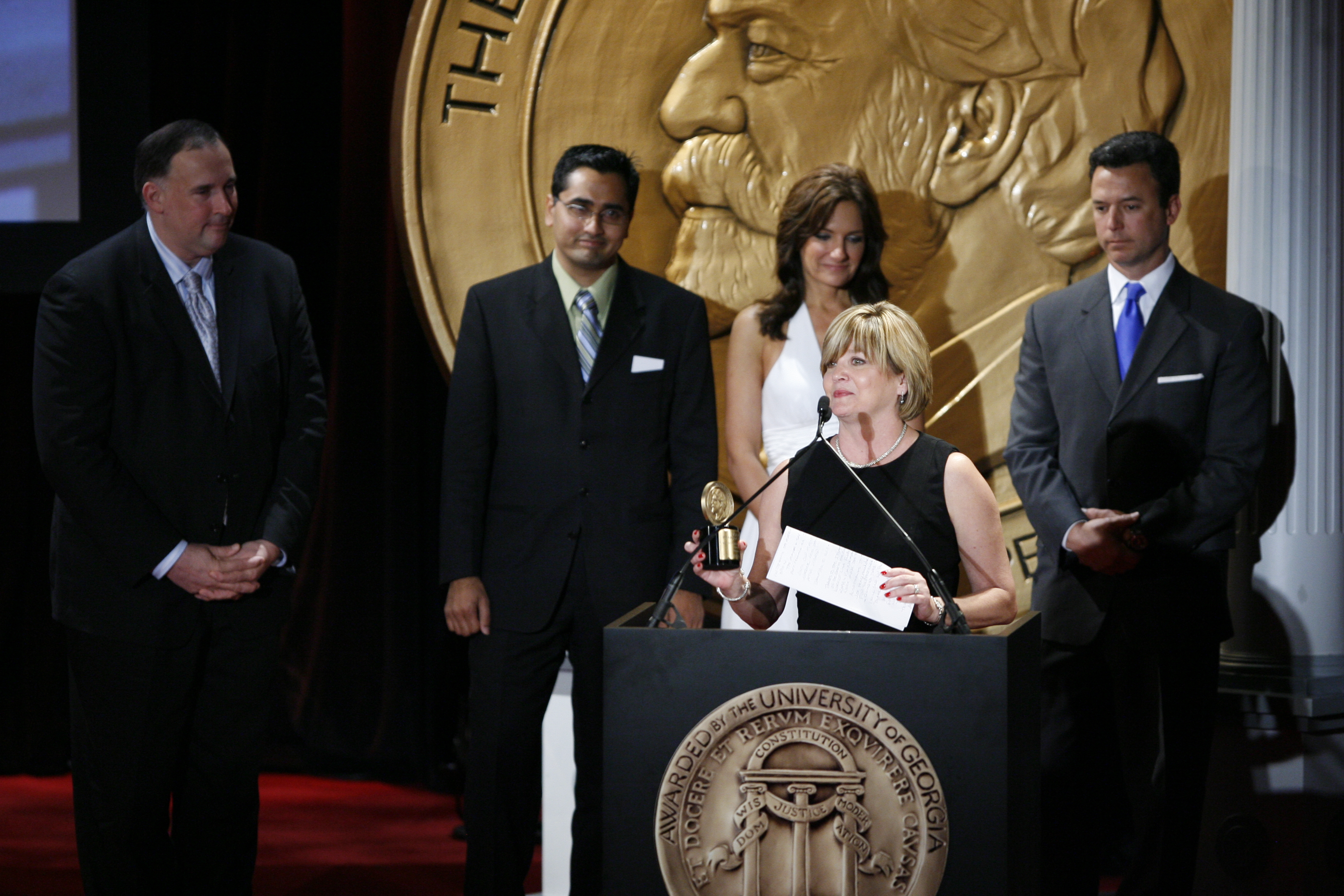
KNXV-TV reporters, including Lisa Fletcher (third from left), receive a 2007 George Foster Peabody Award for "Security Risks at Sky Harbor"

KNXV-TV has won five George Foster Peabody Awards. The first, in 2007, was for "Security Risks at Sky Harbor", which exposed lapses in security at the airport overnight. The station won a second in 2012 for "Ford Escape: Exposing a Deadly Defect", which led to a recall of SUVs. KNXV won three more Peabody Awards in the early 2020s for a series of investigations about the Phoenix Police Department. In 2020, Chief Investigative Reporter Dave Biscobing was awarded for "Full Disclosure", on the state of Brady lists in the state, which also received an Alfred I. duPont–Columbia University Award and The Hillman Prize. Another Biscobing report, "Politically Charged", won another Peabody in 2021 along with a George Polk Award. KNXV's investigative team, again led by Biscobing, won a Peabody Award for a 32-part series called "Policing Phoenix".

=== Non-news programming ===
KNXV-TV also airs one non-news local program: Sonoran Living, a long-running late morning lifestyle program which debuted in 2000. It is broadcast each weekday at 9 a.m. and hosted by Susan Casper and Terri Ouellette.

=== Notable on-air staff ===
- Lisa Fletcher – anchor (2002–2007)
- Craig Fouhy – sports director
- Lori Jane Gliha
- Tony Kovaleski – reporter (1994–1997)
- Anne Ryman – reporter (2023–present)
- Kinsey Schofield – anchor and reporter (2016–2017)
- Bob Woodruff – reporter

== Technical information and subchannels ==
KNXV-TV broadcasts from South Mountain. Its signal is multiplexed:

Subchannels of KNXV-TV
Subchannel	Res.	Short name	Programming
15.1	720p	ABC15	ABC
15.2	720p	Ant TV	Antenna TV/Scripps Sports
15.3	480i	LAFF TV	Laff
15.5	480i	QVC2	QVC2
61.1	1080i	AZ 61	KASW (Independent)

Broadcast on behalf of another station

KNXV's first subchannel offering was a traffic subchannel, launched in 2008. In 2011, subchannel 15.2 began carrying the Live Well Network; LWN was replaced with classic television network Antenna TV on January 1, 2014. The Antenna TV subchannel, beginning with the 2024–25 NHL season, airs select Utah Mammoth and Vegas Golden Knights games during conflicts with sister station KASW.

The main 61.1 subchannel of KASW is also broadcast on the KNXV-TV multiplex; KASW, Phoenix's high-power ATSC 3.0 (NextGen TV) station, carries KNXV-TV in that format.

=== Translators ===
KNXV-TV is broadcast on these translators in northern and northwestern Arizona:

- Big Sandy Valley: K27DA-D
- Bullhead City: K04GT-D
- Camp Verde: K23FZ-D
- Cottonwood: K33NZ-D, K34EE-D
- Dolan Springs: K31PA-D
- Flagstaff: K24KS-D
- Golden Valley: K27NT-D
- Kingman: K30LL-D
- Lake Havasu City: K24NG-D
- Meadview: K21NQ-D
- Moccasin: K35EE-D
- Prescott: K19KV-D
- Needles, etc., CA: K31HY-D

KNXV did not have any translator coverage until 1989, when it signed on a translator in Flagstaff. When it became an ABC affiliate in 1995, it replaced KTVK on some transmitters in Mohave County's translator network, the largest in the state. The second transmitter in Cottonwood rebroadcast KASW prior to its ATSC 3.0 conversion.
