= KTVW-DT =

Television station in Phoenix, Arizona

- Phoenix, Arizona; United States
- Channels: Digital: 33 (UHF); Virtual: 33
- Branding: Univision Arizona; UniMás Arizona (33.2); Noticias N+ Univision Arizona (newscasts)

Programming
- Affiliations: 33.1: Univision; 33.2: UniMás; for others, see § Subchannels

Ownership
- Owner: TelevisaUnivision; (KTVW License Partnership, G.P.)
- Sister stations: KFPH-DT, KHOT-FM, KOMR, KQMR, KQBU-FM

History
- First air date: September 2, 1979
- Former call signs: KTVW-TV (1979–2009)
- Former channel numbers: Analog: 33 (UHF, 1979–2009); Digital: 34 (UHF, until 2009)
- Former affiliations: SIN (1979–1987)

Technical information
- Licensing authority: FCC
- Facility ID: 35705
- ERP: 470 kW
- HAAT: 510 m (1,673 ft)
- Transmitter coordinates: 33°20′0″N 112°3′49″W
- Translator(s): KFPH-DT 13.2 Flagstaff; for others, see § Translators

Links
- Public license information: Public file; LMS
- Website: UnivisionArizona.com

KTVW-DT (channel 33) is a television station in Phoenix, Arizona, United States, serving as the local outlet for the Spanish-language network Univision. It is owned and operated by TelevisaUnivision alongside Flagstaff-licensed UniMás outlet KFPH-DT, channel 13 (which KTVW-DT simulcasts on its second digital subchannel). The two stations share studios on 30th Street in southern Phoenix; KTVW-DT's transmitter is located atop South Mountain on the city's south side.

The station's signal is relayed on two low-power translators: Class A station KTVW-CD (channel 27) in Flagstaff, and KDOS-LD (channel 19) in Globe. KTVW is also rebroadcast on the second digital subchannel of KFPH, whose transmitter is located atop Mormon Mountain, about 20 miles (32 km) south of Flagstaff in the Coconino National Forest.

In addition, KUVE-DT (channel 46) in Green Valley and KUVE-CD (channel 42) in Tucson operate as semi-satellites of KTVW-DT, expanding the Univision signal into Southern Arizona. As such, they simulcast all Univision programming as provided through their parent, and share a website with KTVW. However, the Tucson stations air separate commercial inserts and legal identifications. There is also a three-hour overnight block on Monday mornings from 2 to 5 a.m. in which the Tucson stations broadcast locally produced English-language programming in accordance with KUVE-CD's Class A license. Local newscasts, produced by KTVW and branded as Noticias 33, are simulcast on KUVE and KUVE-CD. Although KUVE maintains its own studios on Forbes Boulevard in Tucson, master control and most internal operations are based at KTVW's facilities.

== History ==
Former logo, used until December 31, 2012.

On March 12, 1976, the Legend of Cibola Television Company (reorganized before launch as the Seven Hills Television Company), owned by a series of principals of the Spanish International Network, filed for a construction permit for a new television station on channel 33 in Phoenix, which was granted on August 17, 1977. The original applicant had just one local stockholder, Julia Zozaya (who later built and owned KNNN-FM 99.9). Facilities were jointly constructed with another construction permit, KNXV-TV; the two stations won approval to construct a new tower on South Mountain in 1978.

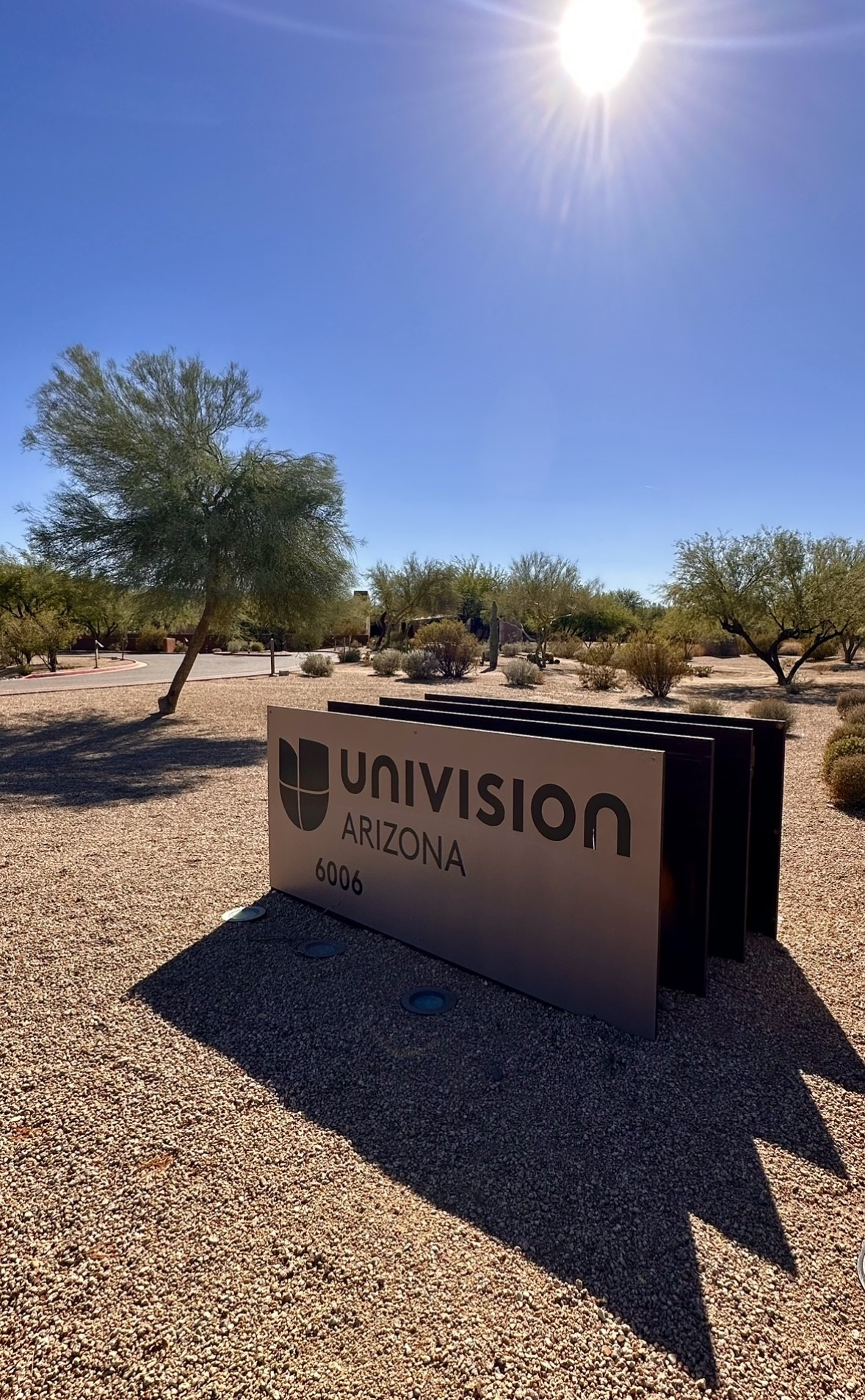
The entrance to Univision KTVW Channel 33's studios in South Phoenix

KTVW-TV signed on as Arizona's first full-time Spanish-language television station on September 2, 1979. Previously, KPAZ-TV channel 21 had aired some Spanish-language programming from 1967 to 1977, but this was curtailed by financial woes and its sale to the Trinity Broadcasting Network. From the beginning, the plan was to build a translator for KTVW in Tucson: this launched November 1, 1980. While owned by SIN-aligned interests, it was not owned by the network proper until then-owner Hallmark Cards acquired it from Seven Hills in 1989.

For 27 years, KTVW was the only full-power Spanish-language television station in Phoenix, which gave it considerable market dominance. In 2006, this came to an end when NBCUniversal and the Daystar Television Network agreed to a trade that converted Phoenix's noncommercial channel 39 into commercial Telemundo outlet KTAZ.

KTVW-DT also operates the UniMás station for the Phoenix market on low-powered KFPH-CD (channel 35), which broadcasts on full-power KFPH-DT (channel 13) in Flagstaff (also a part of the Phoenix market), giving it "must-carry" broadcast station status on satellite providers DirecTV and Dish Network.

== News operation ==
KTVW began producing local news in the early 1980s with a 10-minute local news update that aired at 10:30 p.m. before 24 Horas from Mexico City; this was replaced with a 6 p.m. newscast in 1984.

KTVW presently broadcasts ten hours of locally produced newscasts each week (with one hour each day, consisting of two half-hour newscasts at 5 and 10 p.m. seven nights a week). The station does not have any on-air weather staffers of its own, instead weather segments during KTVW's newscasts are produced by Houston sister station KXLN-DT. The station's local newscasts (currently known as Noticias Univision 33) rank among the top-rated local news programs in the market, either English or Spanish. The station had the highest-rated newscast in Phoenix among the demographics of adults between the ages of 18–34 and 18–49 in 2004.

== Technical information ==
=== Subchannels ===
The station's signal is multiplexed:

Subchannels of KTVW-DT
Subchannel	Res.	Short name	Programming
33.1	720p	KTVW-DT	Univision
33.2	720p	UniMas	UniMás (KFPH-DT)
33.3	480i	HSN	HSN
33.4	480i	Confess	Confess
33.5	480i	ShopLC	Shop LC
33.6	480i	BT2	Infomercials (4:3)
33.7	480i	MSGold	MovieSphere Gold
35.1	720p	KFPH-CD	UniMás (KFPH-CD)

Simulcast of subchannels of another station
Subchannel broadcast with MPEG-4 video
Broadcast on behalf of another station

=== Analog-to-digital conversion ===
KTVW shut down its analog signal, over UHF channel 33, at 10:59 p.m. on June 12, 2009, the official date on which full-power television stations in the United States transitioned from analog to digital broadcasts under federal mandate. The station's digital signal remained on its pre-transition UHF channel 34 to channel 33 for post-transition operations. Prior to the shutdown of its analog signal, the station's personnel gave information on how to connect and operate their digital converters, and then counting down the last 15 seconds.

=== Translators ===
- KTVW-CD 27 Flagstaff–Doney Park
- KDOS-LD 19 Globe

Formerly, KTVW was on channels 17 and 52 in Tucson before the launch of its locally operated Univision affiliate KUVE-DT 38/46.

== See also ==
- Telemundo/Daystar license swap
