= Morley Cowles Ballantine =

American editor (1925–2009)

- Born: Elizabeth Morley Cowles; May 21, 1925; Des Moines, Iowa, US
- Died: October 10, 2009 (aged 84); Durango, Colorado
- Education: BA, Southwest Studies, Fort Lewis College (1975)
- Occupations: Newspaper publisher, editor, philanthropist
- Years active: 1952–2009
- Spouses: Richard P. Gale Jr.; Arthur A. Ballantine
- Children: 4
- Parents: John Cowles Sr. (father); Elizabeth Bates Cowles (mother)
- Relatives: Gardner Cowles Sr., grandfather John Cowles Jr., brother
- Awards: Colorado Business Hall of Fame (2002); Colorado Women's Hall of Fame (2014)

Elizabeth Morley Cowles Gale Ballantine (May 21, 1925 – October 10, 2009), known as Morley Cowles Ballantine, was an American newspaper publisher, editor, philanthropist, and women's rights activist. Scion of an Iowan newspaper publishing family, she and her second husband, Arthur A. Ballantine, purchased two Durango, Colorado newspapers in 1952, which they merged into The Durango Herald by 1960. The couple also started the Ballantine Family Fund, which supported arts and education in Southwest Colorado. After her husband's death in 1975, Ballantine took over the chairmanship of the family-owned publishing company, continuing to produce a weekly column and editorials. She received many journalism awards and several honorary degrees. She was inducted into the Colorado Business Hall of Fame in 2002 and was posthumously inducted into the Colorado Women's Hall of Fame in 2014.

== Early life and family ==
Elizabeth Morley Cowles was born on May 21, 1925, in Des Moines, Iowa, the eldest of four children of John Cowles Sr. and his wife Elizabeth (née Bates). Her grandfather, Gardner Cowles Sr., had bought The Des Moines Register in 1903; her father became vice president, general manager and associate publisher of the Des Moines morning and evening newspapers in the 1920s. In 1935, when her grandfather, father, and uncle Gardner Cowles Jr. bought The Minneapolis Star, her father moved the family to Minneapolis. Her mother was active in women's rights and civil rights, being the founder of the Planned Parenthood branch in Iowa and a lifetime member of the National Association for the Advancement of Colored People.

== Education ==
Elizabeth attended the Greenwood Elementary School in Des Moines. She went on to study at Smith College, Stanford University, and the University of Minnesota. However, she did not earn an undergraduate degree until 1975, receiving her BA in Southwest Studies at Fort Lewis College in Durango, Colorado.

== Marriages ==
In July 1944 she married Richard P. Gale Jr., a private in the United States Army. They had one son, Richard. Gale committed suicide in March 1946. In July 1947 she remarried to Arthur A. Ballantine, a graduate of Harvard and Yale who was employed as a reporter for the Minneapolis Star and Tribune owned by her father. The couple had one son and two daughters.

== Newspaper editor and publisher ==
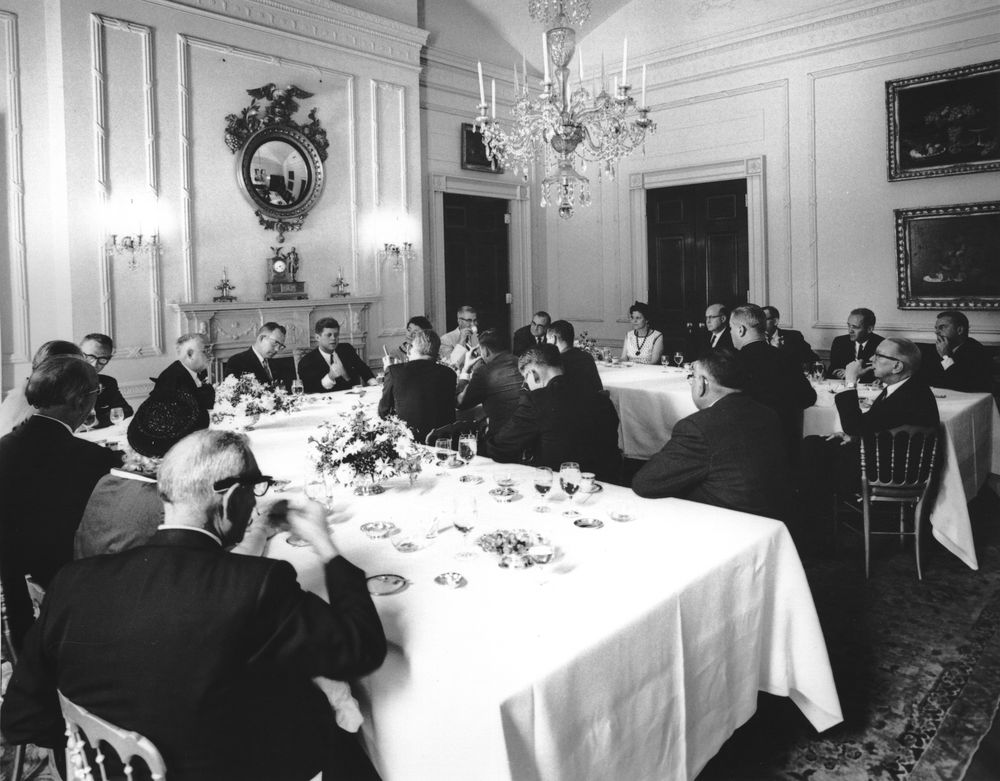
Morley Cowles Ballantine sits to the left of President John F. Kennedy at a 1962 White House luncheon for Colorado editors and publishers (White House photograph)

My mother has been called the 'Kay Graham of Colorado'. Both were born to powerful newspaper families, and both were pushed to leadership at the death of a spouse who was a newspaper publisher. (Morley, however, was experienced as a newspaper columnist.) Both women became charismatic and forceful business and cultural leaders in the aftermath of becoming widows. Neither remarried.

–Elizabeth Ballantine

In June 1952 the Ballantines purchased two Durango-area newspapers, the daily Durango Herald-Democrat and the weekly Durango News, and relocated their family to the city. By 1960 they had merged both publications into The Durango Herald. Morley served as editor while Arthur managed the financial side of the newspaper; they worked at adjoining desks. Under their stewardship, the newspaper "championed educational and cultural causes and promoted progressive government". Ballantine wrote a weekly column as well as editorials which addressed both local and international issues, signing her columns with the initials "MCB". In some instances, she and her husband wrote opposing editorials, as during the 1968 United States presidential election, when she endorsed Hubert Humphrey and he endorsed Richard Nixon. She also penned an advice column.

She was considered "progressive" for employing both men and women as advisors. Her connections as the scion of a prominent newspaper family afforded her broader contacts than would normally be available to a small-town publisher. She was photographed sitting beside President John F. Kennedy at a 1962 luncheon for Colorado publishers and editors at the White House.

Ballantine became chairman of the board of the newspaper after her husband's death in 1975. She continued to serve as editor, but passed on the duties of publisher to her son, Richard, in 1983. She expanded the holdings of the family-owned publishing company with the acquisition of the Cortez Journal and the Mancos Times in 1999 and the Dolores Star in 2000.

== Philanthropist ==
The couple founded the Ballantine Family Fund in 1957. The fund supported non-profit organizations for the arts and education in Southwest Colorado. Its early grants included the development of Fort Lewis College from a two-year agricultural and mechanical college to a four-year college, and the establishment of the campus' Center of Southwest Studies with an initial donation of $10,000 in 1964. The Ballantines gifted more than $1 million to the Center in its first 40 years of existence. Other fund beneficiaries were the University of Denver, the Fountain Valley School, the Durango Arts Center, and the San Juan County Historical Society. The fund has been operated by trustees since the Ballantines' deaths; in 2017 it awarded more than $300,000 in grants.

== Other activities ==
Ballantine actively supported women's rights both in her professional and philanthropic work. She wrote editorials promoting equal pay for equal work, workplace harassment, and pro-choice. Unlike other Colorado publishers, Ballantine gave money as well as endorsements to women's political campaigns. She was a strong supporter of EMILY's List, and also donated to the campaigns of women candidates in other states. She was a primary supporter of the Durango Clinic run by Rocky Mountain Planned Parenthood, which awarded her its Margaret Sanger Award in 2004.

== Affiliations and memberships ==
In 1968 Ballantine became the first woman chair for the Colorado Associated Press Association. She was a founding member of the Women's Resource Center in Durango and the Women's Foundation of Colorado. Active in the League of Women Voters for more than five decades, she served on the state board of that organization from 1960 to 1965. She was a trustee of Simpson College, Fort Lewis College, and the University of Denver.

Ballantine was a member of local arts and library boards, as well as state planning commissions, including the Anti-Discrimination Commission (1959–1961), the Colorado Land Use Commission, the state board for National Historic Preservation, and the state Commission on the Status of Women (1973–1975).

== Honors and awards ==
Ballantine received numerous journalism awards. Her first, in 1953, was a first-place prize from the Colorado Press Association (CPA) for an editorial supporting the right of the President of the United States "to negotiate state treaties". She won five of the seventeen CPA awards received by The Durango Herald in 1956. Among the shared awards won by Ballantine and her husband was a 1967 outstanding journalism award from the University of Colorado School of Journalism.

She received an honorary degree from Simpson College in 1980, an honorary doctorate from the University of Denver in 2002, and an honorary doctorate from Fort Lewis College in 2004, being the first woman to receive the latter degree.

Ballantine was honored as 1990 Citizen of the Year by the Durango Area Chamber of Commerce and 2000 Colorado Philanthropist of the Year by the Governor's Commission on National Community Service and the Association for Healthcare Philanthropy. She was the 2001 Arts and Humanities Honoree of the Bonfils–Stanton Foundation. She was inducted into the Colorado Business Hall of Fame in 2002.

In 2007, the Durango Area Chamber Resort Association renamed its annual Athena Award as the Morley Ballantine Award. In 2014 Ballantine was posthumously inducted into the Colorado Women's Hall of Fame.

== Death ==
Ballantine died of respiratory failure at her home in Durango on October 10, 2009, aged 84.
