= Russell Cowles =

American artist (1887–1979)

- Russell Cowles
- Born: October 7, 1887; Algona, Iowa
- Died: February 22, 1979 (aged 91); Manhattan
- Known for: Artist

Russell Cowles (1887–1979) was an American artist who painted landscapes, still lifes, and human forms in a style that combined both modernist and traditional elements. In 1947 The New York Times critic Howard Devree said "his work shows a remarkably dynamic understanding of both traditional occidental and oriental painting as well as of the abstract principles which activate and underlie the modern movement as such". Over a career that spanned some fifty years, he achieved an unusual degree of success as measured by gallery representation, commercial sales of his work, critical reception, and representation in museum collections. He traveled widely throughout his life, combining the study and practice of art with an interest in learning about distant places and cultures. These travels included a circumferential world tour of nearly two years as well as frequent trips to Europe and travel within the United States.

During the first two decades of his career, he experimented with a range of styles from neo-classical and academic to abstract and non-objective. As he moved from one to the next, he absorbed its value to him and eventually established a mature style that was seen as completely his own. In 1946, a critic of the New York Sun wrote of Cowles's mature style that, "by artful simplification and placement of form, he unfailingly achieves designs of perfect balance. Essentially a realist. he is discreet in his modifications; forms are divested of superficialities, but never subjected to extreme distortion". In 1952, a critic for the Los Angeles Times called him "a sensitive, well balanced, highly cultivated artist who loves his medium and demands of himself a craftsmanship to match his knowledge and sensibility".

== Early life and education ==
Russell Cowles was born on October 7, 1887, in Algona, Iowa, and was raised in Des Moines, Iowa. Before her marriage, his mother had attended classes at the School of the Art Institute of Chicago and, during his childhood, she encouraged his interest in art. After graduating from West High School in Des Moines, he enrolled and spent two years at Cornell College in Mount Vernon, Iowa. He subsequently transferred to Dartmouth, graduating in 1909.

By this time his rags-to-riches father had succeeded in banking and turned a failing newspaper, the Des Moines Register, into a widely-read and financially successful business. As an adult, Cowles participated in the family's prosperity thus ensuring that he could live well and travel widely while pursuing a career in art.

While studying at Dartmouth Cowles attended two sessions of the summer school of the Art Students League in Woodstock, New York. He later referred to his college education as poor preparation for an artist. He said its emphasis on an accurate depiction of the world with archaeological exactness was a "misfortune", implying that he achieved his own approach to art, which he said was neither academic nor conventional, only after he had overcome the influence of this "whole system of education".

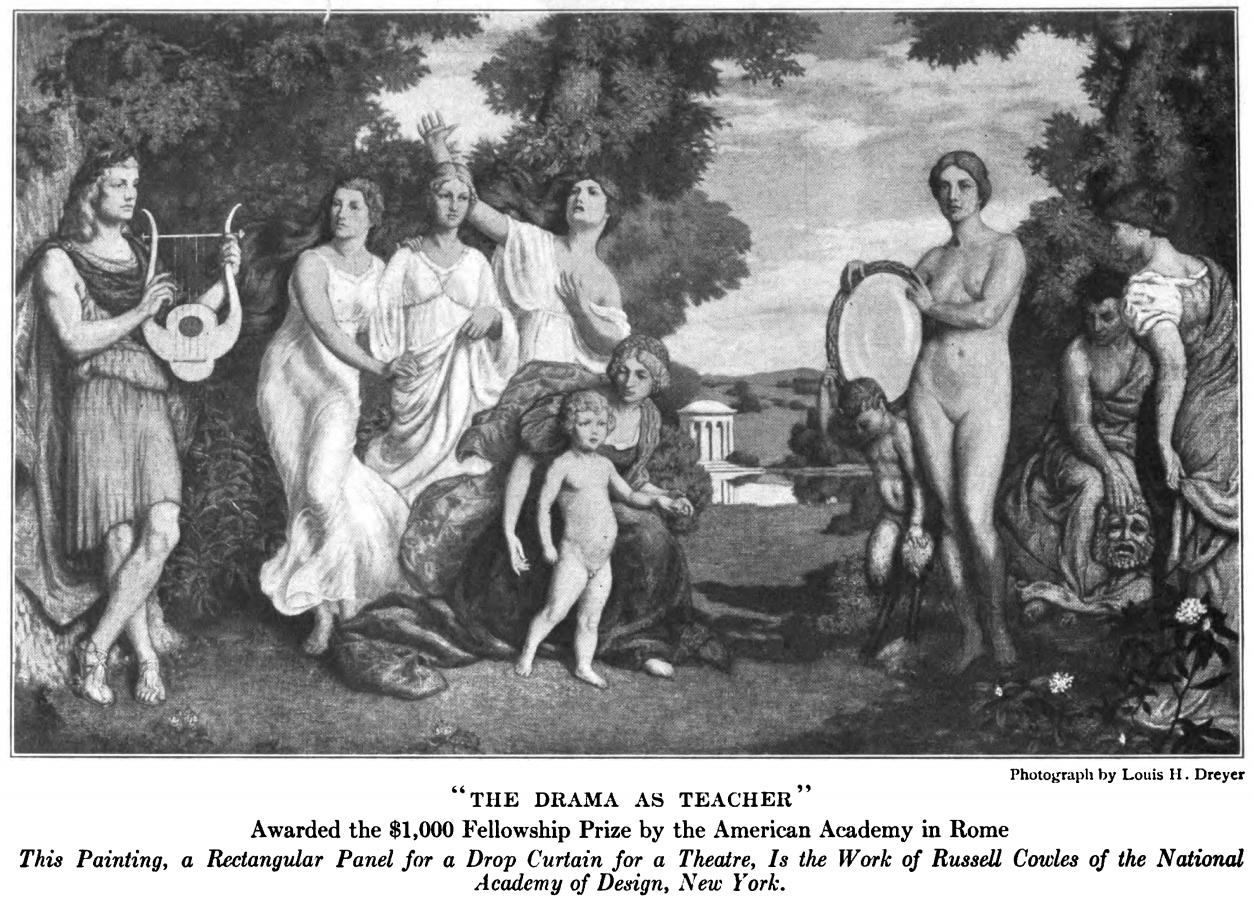
Russell Cowles, The Drama as Teacher, 1915, design for a theater drop curtain

After graduating from Dartmouth Cowles traveled in Europe for three months, took a job in the advertising department of one of his father's newspapers, and studied at the Cumming School of Art in Des Moines. (Note: The Cumming School of Art evolved from the Des Moines Academy of Arts at the end of the nineteenth century. Its director Charles Atherton Cumming had been a teacher at Cornell College. In 1909, while continuing to operate the Cumming School, he joined the faculty at Iowa State University.) He subsequently moved to Manhattan where, in 1911, he took classes first at the National Academy of Design and then at the Art Students League At this time, he also studied independently under Douglas Volk, Kenyon Cox, and Barry Faulkner, all well-known muralists with traditional artistic values. In 1915 he was awarded a fellowship in painting at the American Academy in Rome. His competition submission was a classically-inspired allegorical painting for a theater drop curtain entitled "The Drama as Teacher". (Note: News accounts said Cowles received the "Prix de Rome" for his submission, however, the Academy did not formally award a prize at that time and, when it began to do so in 1921, the name given was Rome Prize. The Prix de Rome that is most widely known is the one given by the French government.) The fellowship included residence, use of a studio at the academy, and funds for travel. In 1918, he exhibited another allegorical painting, the "Rape of Europa" at an Academy exhibition. His studies at the Academy being interrupted by World War I, Cowles spread his studies over four years rather than the usual three. "The Drama as Teacher" was reproduced as the frontispiece of a book called Masterpieces of Modern Drama (Doubleday, Page, & Co., 1916). An image taken from the book is shown at right.

== Career in art ==
The artist should strive for nothing except the truest, most complete, most perfect, expression of that thing within himself, which he wishes to put on the canvas. I think all great art must come from that inner single-mindedness and to achieve this, the artist must shut from his vision all mere outward currents and eddies, and fads and fashions.

— Russell Cowles, Santa Fe New Mexican, February 6, 1935, p 2.

During the early 1920s, Cowles lived and worked in Manhattan. In 1923, continuing his preference for large-scale, neo-classical, allegorical works, he made a mural in two panels for the lobby of one of his father's newspapers, the Des Moines Register. One of them symbolized the press and its functions and the other symbolized the contributions that newspapers make to social justice, freedom of speech, and open debate of issues. In 1925, while traveling abroad, he was awarded a $500 prize by the Art Institute of Chicago for another neo-classical painting, "The Consolation of Ariadne". Cowles's three allegorical paintings received an unusual amount of attention in the press. The New York Times printed a photographic reproduction of "The Drama as Teacher" in its issue for August 1, 1915, the Des Moines Register devoted a full page to the two press panels in its issue for June 3, 1923, and American Magazine of Art reproduced "Consolation of Ariadne" in its December 1925 issue.

Russell Cowles, Seated Nude, about 1932, oil on canvas, 36 x 28 inches

In 1927 and 1928 Cowles traveled extensively in Europe and North Africa as well as South, South-Eastern, and East Asia. By the time he returned to the United States in December 1928, he had made careful study of foreign art styles and cultures and produced a large portfolio of paintings and drawings. This world tour resulted in a transition in his work away from large-scale neo-classical subjects and treatment. Indicating the complexity of the sources on which Cowles drew, one critic saw in this new approach the influence of Rubens and Renoir, while another saw in it the influence of Cézanne and Gauguin. A third critic saw the influence of Cowles's study in Asia and said he seemed receptive to the modern art of Europe, but was hardly "a convert". In 1935, Cowles himself expressed a belief that "the artist must shut from his vision all mere outward currents and eddies, and fads and fashions." In 1933, he showed a painting, "Seated Nude", in a group show in New York sponsored by Salons of America. This painting is shown at left.

In the mid-1930s Cowles began experimenting with abstraction while continuing to produce realistic work. One critic saw his abstractions as a phase that "was entered into consciously with a view to the idea of getting a firmer grip on the fundamentals of pictorial composition". Critics now began to see in his work, as one said, an "authentic personal note" or, as another said, he was, in his work, "essentially Russell Cowles, versatile American painter". In 1935, the Feragil Galleries in New York gave Cowles his first solo exhibition and he participated in a group show at the Whitney Museum of American Art. At that time he also began splitting his year between New York and New Mexico In 1936 he was given a solo exhibition that appeared first at the Denver Art Museum and later in the Colorado Springs Fine Arts Center and the Wichita Art Museum. In 1937 he showed New Mexico paintings in a solo exhibition at the Chappell House gallery in the Denver Art Museum. The museum's director said this recent work showed "a richer and more fluent expression of his ideas". The next year Cowles began a long and fruitful relationship with the Kraushaar Galleries in a group exhibition and he participated in another group show at the Whitney.

Between 1935 and 1955, Cowles received encouragement from The New York Times critic, Howard Devree. Devree said Cowles used "consistent development" and "courageous experiment" to, eventually, achieve "front rank" among American artists. (Note: The quoted text comes from a review published in 1946. See Devree's reviews of 1935, 1938, 1940, 1941, 1944, 1946, 1947, 1950, 1954, and 1955.)

Russell Cowles, The Farmer and the Raincloud, about 1938, oil on canvas, 50 x 40 inches

In about 1938, Cowles made what would become one of his best known paintings, "The Farmer and the Raincloud". The painting (shown at right) was exhibited at the 1939 New York World's Fair and achieved widespread distribution when sold as a lithographic print in a portfolio called "American Art Today" (New York, National Art Society, 1939). In a caption to a photo of the painting in the Des Moines Tribune, Cowles said that it might appear to have been painted in Iowa, but was actually suggested by an event he witnessed in Nova Scotia.

Beginning in 1939, Kraushaar's gave him eleven solo exhibitions, nine during his life and two after death. (Note: Kraushaar's gave Cowles solo exhibitions in 1939, 1941, 1944, 1946, 1948, 1950, 1954, 1959, 1965, 1973, 1983, and 1987,)

In the 1940s, he began splitting his time between an apartment in Manhattan and a farm in New Milford, Connecticut. During this period, critics saw an evolution from content that lacked emotional content and a tendency to be "coldly intellectual" toward greater "warmth of color and emotional depth", as one said. He continued to show frequently with solo shows at Iowa State University (1939), the Corcoran Gallery (1939), the Minneapolis Institute of Art (1941), and (as mentioned) Kraushaar's. He also participated in group shows frequently at Kraushaar's and also in museum settings such as the Riverside Museum (1940), the Whitney (1940, 1943, 1945), and the Pennsylvania Academy of Fine Arts (1940 and 1943). In the Spring of 1946, a critic for the New York Sun said Cowles was able to achieve "stunning results" through "skillful line usage and suggestive color accompaniment" and a critic for The New York Times considered Cowles to have by then secured a position "in the front rank of American artists", saying that "The technical integrity that is characteristic of all Cowles' work helps to give it an immediate appeal for it is combined with a disciplined emotive use of color." "His rhythms", he wrote, "are of life as well as of color and form and they evoke a response from both the mind and the heart". Later that year Life magazine included a painting by Cowles in a review article called "Ten Years of American Art; Life Reviews the Record of a Lively, Important Decade".

During the 1950s and 1960s, despite the art world's enthusiasm for abstract expressionism and the New York School, Cowles continued to show in commercial galleries and to draw favorable critical reviews. In addition to solo exhibitions at Kraushaar's (1950, 1954, 1959, 1965), he was given solo shows at the Dalzell Hatfield Galleries (Los Angeles) in 1952 and the gallery at Dartmouth College in 1963 (a retrospective). In 1950, Howard Devree said he saw Cowles "at his best" in a Kraushaar exhibition. Two years later another critic called him a "master colorist and a faultless designer". In March 1954, the Evening Star of Washington D.C. reproduced one of his paintings in a review of an exhibition at the Art Center in Des Moines and, regarding a Kraushaar show a month before, he was said to possess "an almost mystical feeling for the essential character of his themes". In reviewing Kraushaar exhibitions of 1959 and 1965, Stuart Preston of The New York Times critic was less enthusiastic about Cowles's work than his fellow critic Howard Devree. Preston did not dismiss Cowles for being a representational artist, however, but being "methodical" and showing a "puritanical mistrust of natural beauty".

A 1973 solo exhibition at Kraushaar's was the last during his lifetime. Between the 1940s and 1970s, Cowles divided his work year between his home in New Milford and an apartment on the Upper East Side of Manhattan. He died at the Manhattan apartment on February 22, 1979.

With each succeeding show over a period of more than a decade, Russell Cowles has secured a surer position in the front rank of American artists.

— Howard Devree, The New York Times, April 28, 1946, page X6

=== Artistic style ===
Cowles achieved his mature style by abandoning his neo-classical mural training and adopting what he called a more "modern school of painting". Calling his early style a "misfortune", he sought a style that was both modern and American. He aimed to use an understanding of abstraction to achieve a satisfying sense of realism. He said he wished to establish "a heightened sense of reality through a rhythmic organization of space". A "clear expression of rhythmic space" was, he believed, "the basic source of all satisfaction in art". In 1939, a critic said Cowles expressed himself through abstraction but was not a "pure abstractionist". In 1946 another critic pointed out that Cowles was "discreet in his modifications; forms are divested of superficialities, but never subjected to extreme distortion."

Russell Cowles, Still Life With Melon, about 1946, oil on canvas, 28 1/2 x 36 inches

In an art exhibition catalog accompanying Cowles's 1936 solo exhibition at the Denver Art Museum, the museum's director, Donald J. Bear, discussed the problem Cowles faced in attempting to "maintain an equilibrium or play between the two dimensional plane of the canvas and three-dimensional space". This, he wrote, "is a complicated affair of balances, weights, patterns, textures, pigments and color—the sum total of which is almost a metaphysical realization of equilibrium". (Note: Quoted in Iowa Artists of the First Hundred Years, by Louise Orwig and Zenobia Brumbaugh Ness (Wallace-Homestead Company, 1939), p. 51.) Cowles himself addressed this subject. In 1947, Cowles showed a painting called "Still Life With Melon" in a solo exhibition at the Dalzell Hatfield Galleries in Los Angeles. This painting is shown at right. In its review of the show, a critic quoted Cowles's comments on the painting. Cowles said, "The dark shapes of the fruit against the very white tablecloth give the objects a sufficient feeling of mass and weight without much of any modeling in light and shade. [There is] no particular sense of light from an outside source falling on the objects, only objects dark in their own color against a light ground. The folds of the tablecloth reduce themselves practically to lines and are utilized for compositional reasons—straight horizontals playing against the large curves of table top, melon, and platter. These curves like the pattern in the cloth are no longer merely qualities of the objects, but are felt as qualities of the picture as a whole." A year later, Howard Devree addressed this topic. He wrote, "Cowles is one of the American artists who paint with a profound realization that the primary problem of the artist is the organization of space in depth—a philosophy of which Cézanne is perhaps the most notable exponent." In a review published in 1948, Devree explained further. He wrote, "Cowles began in youth with a thorough study of the old masters and their methods, evolving slowly into a sound abstractly based modernism... Lights and darks, cools and warms, tonalities, the diverse ways of achieving recession in space and the whole spatial problem are inherent in his work, which includes some of the subtlest and most beautiful painting being done by contemporary Americans." He concluded, "This is some of the most disciplined work being done today and it bears the promise of enduring, for it derives both from tradition and the basic abstract elementals of the modern movement." Two years later Devree succinctly summarized his appreciation for Cowles's work: He wrote, "Cowles is eminently a painter's painter who has contrived to blend in his work something of the essential abstraction of the Orient with something of the richness of color and deeply rooted organization of Renaissance masters, always from a highly modern view-point."

== Personal life and family ==
Cowles was born in Algona, Iowa, on October 7, 1887. His parents were Gardner Cowles, Sr. (1861–1946) and Florence Maude (Call) Cowles (1861–1950). Gardner Cowles, Sr. was a self-made businessman and lifetime Iowa resident. While Cowles was a child, his father was, first, an Algona school superintendent, and, later, a Des Moines banker. While Cowles was a student at Western High School in Des Moines, Gardner Cowles, Sr. put all his capital into saving a failing newspaper, the Des Moines Register and Leader. Over the next few decades, he transformed it into an award-winning, widely read, and financially successful paper, the Des Moines Register. Cowles's mother was an Algona native and daughter of Iowa pioneers. A school teacher before her marriage, she had attended classes at the Art Institute of Chicago and had graduated in 1884 from Northwestern University. She and Gardner Cowles, Sr. met at the school where he was superintendent and married in Algona in 1884.

Cowles's siblings were Helen (1892–1963), Bertha (1892–1980), Florence (1895–1985), John, Sr. (1898–1983), and Gardner, Jr. (1903–1985). John Cowles Sr. and Gardner Cowles Jr. joined with their father to create the Cowles Media Company, a publishing business based in Minneapolis, Minnesota. Established in 1935, when the family purchased the Minneapolis Star, the company grew to include the Minneapolis Evening Journal and the Minneapolis Tribune. It branched into magazine publishing with Harper's Magazine (1965–1980) and into television (1955–1980s) and was sold to the McClatchy Co in 1998. Gardner Cowles, Jr. was a co-founder of Look magazine in 1937.

After graduating from Des Moines public schools and Dartmouth College, Cowles made the first of many overseas trips. These travels often included both study and casual sightseeing. A honeymoon trip to Europe in 1923, for example, appears to have been entirely given over to the latter as was a summer auto tour in England & Scotland. In between these two trips, Cowles spent the autumn months of 1924 painting in Mallorca. While traveling around the world between October 1926 and December 1928, he made many paintings and sketches but also wrote many letters for publication on local cultures and politics in places he visited.

Cowles extended his stay in Rome from the usual three years to almost five when, in 1918, he took leave from the academy to work in the secret service branch of the office of the U.S. naval attache in Rome.

In an event that was called "a wedding of social prominence", he and Eleanor Lamont Sackett married in New York in 1923. The daughter of a New York banker, she had been born and raised in New York City. She was a graduate of Smith College and had taken art classes in New York. Two years later she obtained a divorce in Paris and resumed her maiden name. In 1928 Cowles married Eleanor Stanton in Cairo, Egypt, during his two-year round-the-world travels. She was the women's page editor of the New York Sun newspaper. They met while she was on assignment in Egypt to write a series of articles. Cowles and Stanton divorced in 1954 and later that year he married Nancy Cardozo who was herself recently divorced. Cordozo was the author of books and short stories, including stories in the New Yorker magazine and a biography of Maud Gonne, an English-born Irish republican revolutionary, suffragette, and actress. None of Cowles's marriages produced children. He was step-father to the two sons, Nick and Jan Eglson, by a former marriage of his third wife.

After their return from the world tour that they took following their marriage, Cowles and his wife returned to New York where he had kept a studio since 1920. In 1929 they began to spend the colder months of the year in Santa Fe, New Mexico. There, Cowles made acquaintance with other modern artists and gave his support to the newly formed Santa Fe Art School. Two years later, while continuing to maintain a residence in New York, the couple built themselves a home in Santa Fe. At the end of the decade, they moved to a farm in New Milford, Connecticut, again retaining a residence in New York.

As a major stockholder in his father's newspaper empire, he was not dependent on art sales for financial support.

Cowles died in New York City on February 22, 1979.
