= Senator Cowles =

Senator Cowles may refer to:

- Charles H. Cowles (1875–1957), North Carolina State Senate
- LaMonte Cowles (1859–1942), Iowa State Senate
- Robert Cowles (born 1950), Wisconsin State Senate
- Thomas Cowles (1809–1884), Connecticut State Senate
