= John Cowles =

John Cowles may refer to:

- John Cowles Sr. (1898–1983), American newspaper and magazine publisher
- John Cowles Jr. (1929–2012), American editor and publisher
- John Cowles (mineralogist), namesake of Cowlesite
- John Cowles (politician) (fl. 1881), member of the 104th New York State Legislature for Monroe County
