= Mike McLachlan =

American politician (1946–2021)

Member of the Colorado House of Representatives from the 59th district
- In office January 9, 2013 – January 7, 2015
- Preceded by: J. Paul Brown
- Succeeded by: J. Paul Brown

Solicitor General of Colorado
- In office 1999–2000

Personal details
- Born: Michael Edward McLachlan; April 18, 1946 Dover, Delaware, U.S.
- Died: June 23, 2021 (aged 75) Durango, Colorado, U.S.
- Party: Democratic
- Spouses: Dixie Self (m. 1968; div. 1971); Deborah Elaine Cowan (m. 1975; div. 1981); Barbara McLachlan (m. 1984; died 2021)
- Children: 2
- Education: Colorado State University Pueblo (BA); University of Arizona (JD)
- Awards: Vietnam Service Medal

Military service
- Branch/service: United States Marine Corps
- Years of service: 1965–1967
- Rank: Corporal
- Battles/wars: Vietnam War

Michael Edward McLachlan (April 18, 1946 – June 23, 2021) was an American attorney and politician who served in the Colorado House of Representatives from the 59th district as a member of the Democratic Party from 2013 to 2015.

McLachlan, the son of a United States Air Force colonel, lived in multiple states and countries during his early life. He graduated from high school in Nebraska and enrolled in the University of Nebraska, but withdrew to join the United States Marine Corps. He graduated from Southern Colorado State College and the University of Arizona, where he was an associate editor of the Arizona Law Review.

McLachlan worked as a clerk for a Colorado Supreme Court justice and as an assistant district attorney. He worked at a law firm until 1995, and then opened his own firm. He was appointed as solicitor general for Colorado in 1998, and defended Colorado's shield law before the Supreme Court of the United States in Hill v. Colorado. He served one term in the state house.

== Early life and education ==
Michael Edward McLachlan was born at the Dover Air Force Base in Dover, Delaware, on April 18, 1946, to Audrey and Joseph J. McLachlan. His father was a colonel in the United States Air Force. The McLachlan family moved to Munich, West Germany, when Mike was six months old. They lived in San Antonio, Dayton, and Pittsburgh during the first five years of his life. They also lived in Arlington and Tampa. In 1959, they moved to Zaragoza, Spain, where McLachlan attended 8th to 11th grade. They moved to Lincoln, Nebraska, in 1963, and he graduated from Pius X High School.

McLachlan attended the University of Nebraska in 1965, but joined the United States Marine Corps that year and arrived in Vietnam on April 14, 1966. He survived a plane crash and was sent back to the United States on April 10, 1967. He was honorably discharged later that year. He was awarded the Navy Commendation Medal and Vietnam Service Medal.

McLachlan moved to Colorado with a friend from Zaragoza to attend Southern Colorado State College. He graduated cum laude with a degree in history in 1970. He graduated with a Juris Doctor from the University of Arizona in 1973. He was an associate editor of the Arizona Law Review from 1972 to 1973.

== Career ==
=== Law ===
McLachlan was admitted to the bar in Colorado in 1973, and worked as a law clerk for Justice Edward C. Day of the Colorado Supreme Court from 1973 to 1974. He worked as an assistant district attorney in the 6th judicial district under Jim Childress from 1974 to May 1976. He joined the Hamilton & Shand law firm and worked there for nineteen years before leaving in 1995, when the firm was known as Hamilton Shand & McLachlan. McLachlan operated his own law firm in Durango, Colorado, for twenty years.

In 1987, McLachlan was one of 149 delegates who participated in a mock constitutional convention organized by the University of Colorado Denver and The Denver Post to examine and discuss changes to the Constitution of Colorado.

On November 13, 1998, Attorney General Ken Salazar appointed McLachlan to serve as Colorado's Solicitor General. In 1993, a shield law for abortion clinics was established and stated that protesters could not come within eight feet of patients within 100 feet of a healthcare facility. McLachlan defended the constitutionality of the law before the Supreme Court of the United States in Hill v. Colorado. The court ruled that the shield law did not violate the First Amendment.

=== Colorado House of Representatives ===
Dickey Lee Hullinghorst convinced McLachlan to run for the Democratic nomination in the Colorado House of Representatives' 59th district. He launched his campaign on February 9, 2012. He won the Democratic nomination without opposition after Patrick Swonger was disqualified. He defeated incumbent Republican J. Paul Brown. McLachlan raised over $133,000 compared to Brown's $113,000 and around $1.2 million was spent during the campaign. Brown stated that he lost due to the success of Amendment 64 and Barack Obama's victory in the state in the concurrent presidential election.

McLachlan voted in favor of legislation to limit magazines to 15 rounds, prohibit conceal-carry on campuses, and universal background checks. There was an unsuccessful attempt to issue a recall election against McLachlan in 2013, due to his support for gun control, but only around 8,500 signatures, less than the 10,587 needed, were gathered. During his tenure in the state house he served on the Judiciary and Agriculture, Livestock, & Natural Resources committees. The American Civil Liberties Union gave him a rating of 71% in 2013, and 100% in 2014.

Brown defeated McLachlan by 170 votes in the 2014 election. McLachlan conceded the election almost two weeks later on November 20. Around $1,180,000 was spent during the campaign, around $570,000 by Republicans and over $600,000 by the Democrats. McLachlan's wife Barbara McLachlan defeated Brown in 2016.

== Personal life ==
McLachlan married Dixie Self in 1968, and divorced her in 1971. He married Deborah Elaine Cowan on January 25, 1975, and divorced in 1981. He married Barbara Hall, with whom he had two children, in November 1984. McLachlan died on June 23, 2021, in Durango.

== Electoral history ==
2012 Colorado House of Representatives 59th district election
Primary election
Party	Candidate	Votes	%
Democratic	Mike McLachlan	3,106	100.00%
Total votes		3,106	100.00%
General election
Democratic	Mike McLachlan	21,632	51.08%
Republican	J. Paul Brown (incumbent)	20,715	48.92%
Total votes		42,347	100.00%

2014 Colorado House of Representatives 59th district election
Primary election
Party	Candidate	Votes	%
Democratic	Mike McLachlan (incumbent)	3,313	100.00%
Total votes		3,313	100.00%
General election
Republican	J. Paul Brown	17,280	50.25%
Democratic	Mike McLachlan (incumbent)	17,110	49.75%
Total votes		34,390	100.00%

== Works cited ==
=== Election data ===
- "2012 Abstract of Votes Cast" (PDF). Secretary of State of Colorado. Archived from the original (PDF) on February 9, 2022.
- "2014 Abstract of Votes Cast" (PDF). Secretary of State of Colorado. Archived from the original (PDF) on September 7, 2023.
- "2016 Abstract of Votes Cast" (PDF). Secretary of State of Colorado. Archived from the original (PDF) on September 7, 2023.

=== News ===
- "AG-elect picks new chief deputy". The Daily Sentinel. November 14, 1998. p. 3A – via Newspapers.com.
- "Catholic Men's Luncheon". The Jet Scoop. December 17, 1965. p. 7 – via Newspapers.com.
- "Deborah Cowan Is Wed; Bridal Held in Colorado". The Montclair Times. February 20, 1975. p. S1 – via Newspapers.com.
- "Deborah Cowan, Michael McLachlan Betrothal Announced". The Coast Star. October 3, 1974. p. 5 – via Newspapers.com.
- "Durango Lawyer Joins Democratic Field of Candidates for HD-59". Telluride Daily Planet. February 16, 2012. Archived from the original on January 30, 2025.
- "Law Review names board". The Arizona Republic. April 7, 1972. p. 31 – via Newspapers.com.
- "Michael McLachlan Obituary". The Durango Herald. June 24, 2021. Archived from the original on January 31, 2025.
- Armijo, Patrick (March 29, 2018). "Colorado recall laws liberal but challenging". The Durango Herald. Archived from the original on February 1, 2025.
- Ashby, Charles (November 7, 2012). "Dems take control of Colorado House". The Daily Sentinel. p. 5A – via Newspapers.com.
- Ashby, Charles (February 19, 2013). "Gun measures clear state House". The Daily Sentinel. p. 1A – via Newspapers.com.
- Gallegos, Bryan (September 1, 1987). "State constitution to be reviewed". The Daily Sentinel. p. 2B – via Newspapers.com.
- Goodland, Marianne (June 24, 2021). "Former state Rep. Mike McLachlan dies, age 75". Colorado Politics. Archived from the original on January 30, 2025.
- Hanel, Joe (March 11, 2014). "Eminent-domain fight creates an odd alliance". The Durango Herald. Archived from the original on February 2, 2025.
- Marcus, Peter (July 18, 2014). "McLachlan vs. Brown — A rematch in HD 59". Colorado Politics. Archived from the original on February 1, 2025.
- Olivarius-Mcallister, Chase (October 4, 2013). "$230,000 filing fine shocks Silverton candidate". The Durango Herald. Archived from the original on February 2, 2025.
- Olivarius-Mcallister, Chase (November 20, 2014). "McLachlan concedes state House race". The Durango Herald. Archived from the original on February 1, 2025.
- Olivarius-Mcallister, Chase (November 1, 2014). "Money drives 59th race to Election Day". The Durango Herald. Archived from the original on February 1, 2025.
- Olivarius-Mcallister, Chase (January 18, 2014). "Money tussle begins in District 59". The Durango Herald. Archived from the original on February 2, 2025.

=== Websites ===
- "ACLU 2013 Legislative Scorecard". American Civil Liberties Union. August 1, 2013. Archived from the original on January 18, 2022.
- "ACLU 2014 Legislative Scorecard". American Civil Liberties Union. August 1, 2014. Archived from the original on January 17, 2022.
- "House Memorial 23-1002" (PDF). Colorado House of Representatives. Archived from the original (PDF) on January 30, 2025.
- "Michael E McLachlan". Law Offices of Michael E. McLachland, P.C. Archived from the original on August 2, 2016.
- "Mike McLachlan". Colorado General Assembly. Archived from the original on February 2, 2025.
- McLachaln, Mike. "Military Service". McLachland for Colorado. Archived from the original (PDF) on July 19, 2014.
