= Cowles Media Company =

American media company

- Company type: Holding company
- Industry: Mass media
- Founded: 1935; 91 years ago
- Founder: John Cowles Sr. and Gardner "Mike" Cowles Jr.
- Defunct: 1998; 28 years ago
- Headquarters: Minneapolis, Minnesota, U.S.
- Area served: United States
- Key people: Gardner Cowles Sr., Gardner "Mike" Cowles Jr., John Cowles Jr., Kingsley H. Murphy Jr.
- Products: Newspaper, magazines, television stations
- Brands: Look, Inc. (1937–1945); Cowles Magazines (1946–1965); Cowles Communications, Inc. (1965–1971)
- Divisions: Cowles Business Media; Cowles Creative Publishing; Cowles Enthusiast Media

Cowles Media Company (/koʊlz/ KOHLZ) (1935–1998) was a newspaper, magazine and information publishing company based in Minneapolis, Minnesota in the United States. The company operated Cowles Business Media, Cowles Creative Publishing, and Cowles Enthusiast Media units. Its flagship publication was the Minneapolis Star-Tribune. Other papers owned by the company at one time were the Des Moines Register, the Buffalo Courier-Express, the Scottsdale Progress and the Rapid City Journal. The company also owned the Register and Tribune Syndicate.

The company traded as Cowles Magazines (1946–1965), and Cowles Communications, Inc. (1965–1971). From 1969 to 1971 Cowles Communications sold Family Circle and other publications, retaining five broadcasting stations, a travel magazine, and a marketing service. Look magazine (1937–1971) was published by an unrelated company known as Look, Inc. (1937–1945). In 1998, Cowles Media was acquired by The McClatchy Company and was absorbed into the larger company at that time and ceased.

== History ==
=== Origins ===
In 1903, banker Gardner Cowles Sr. acquired a 50% stake in the Des Moines Register and Leader, a newspaper in Iowa. This made him the largest shareholder. The paper was later renamed to The Des Moines Register. In 1908, he acquired the Des Moines Tribune. In 1922, Cowles established the Register and Tribune Syndicate with Henry P. Martin as its general manager. In 1931, the company entered the radio market when it acquired the KSO radio station in Clarinda and moved it to Des Moines, Iowa. In March 1935, KSO became KRNT, with the new call letters, "R 'n T" short for "Register and Tribune."

=== Growth ===
In June 1935, the Cowles family purchased the Minneapolis Star. At that point, the Cowles Media Company formed with Gardner Cowles Sr. handing control of his newspapers to his sons John Cowles Sr. and Gardner "Mike" Cowles Jr. In 1939, the company purchased the Minneapolis Evening Journal and merged it with the Star to form the Star-Journal. In 1941 the company bought the Minneapolis Morning Tribune. This gave Cowles ownership of the major newspapers on the western side of the Twin Cities. The Tribune became Minneapolis' morning newspaper, the Star-Journal (shortened to the Star in 1947) was the evening newspaper, and they published a joint Sunday edition. A separate evening newspaper called the Times was spun off and published until 1948. In 1949, Colwes sold WOL (AM) to The Capital Broadcasting Co.

In 1955, Cowles entered the television market as the 60% majority owner of KRNT-TV in Des Moines, Iowa. This marked the start of the company's expansion into television. Later that year Cowles acquired KTVH for $1.07 million. In 1964, Cowles Media acquired the Rapid City Journal. In April 1965, the company bought a 50% stake in Harper's Magazine, followed by the Great Falls Tribune. The company sold WREG-TV to The New York Times Company in 1971, KRNT to Stauffer Publications in 1973, and WREC in 1974. Cowles purchased the South Idaho Press in 1977, and the Buffalo Courier-Express in 1979.

=== Decline ===
In 1980, Harper's Magazine was sold to the MacArthur Foundation after Cowles had announced plans to close the publication. In April 1982, the afternoon Star was discontinued and the two papers merged into a single morning paper called the Minneapolis Star and Tribune. In June 1982, the Des Moines Tribune was absorbed into the Des Moines Register. In July 1982, KTVH was sold for $12 million.

In September 1982, the Buffalo Courier-Express ceased publication after losing $8.6 million annually. This came after the paper's union rejected a sale to News American Publishing, owned by Rupert Murdoch, as the deal called for a 40% cut in staff and other contract givebacks.

Cowles sold WDRB for $10 million in 1984, the Des Moines Register to Gannett Co. in 1985, and the Register and Tribune Syndicate to Hearst for $4.3 million in 1986. The company acquired the Scottsdale Progress in May 1987, and then sold the South Idaho Press to Park Communications in July 1987, the Rapid City Journal to Lee Enterprises for $45 million in February 1990, Great Falls Tribune to Gannett Co. in May 1990, and the Scottsdale Progress to Cox Newspapers in 1993.

The Cowles Media Company was purchased by The McClatchy Company for $1.4 billion in 1997. McClatchy kept the Star Tribune newspaper, which by then was the primary asset in the sale, and sold the other business units to PRIMEDIA and to a management team.

== Newspapers owned by the Cowles Media Company ==
Name	City	Years owned	Fate
Des Moines Register	Des Moines, Iowa	1903–1985	Sold to the Gannett Company
Des Moines Tribune	Des Moines, Iowa	1908–1982	Absorbed into the Des Moines Register
Star-Tribune	Minneapolis, Minnesota	1935–1998	Sold to The McClatchy Company
Buffalo Courier-Express	Buffalo, New York	1979–1982	Ceased publication after sale to Rupert Murdoch was rejected by union
Scottsdale Progress	Scottsdale, Arizona	1987–1993	Sold to Cox Newspapers
Rapid City Journal	Rapid City, South Dakota	1964–1990	Sold to Lee Enterprises
Great Falls Tribune	Great Falls, Montana	1965–1990	Sold to Gannett Company
South Idaho Press	Burley, Idaho	1977–1987	Sold to Park Communications

== List of specialty magazines ==
=== Healthy lifestyles ===
- Climbing magazine
- Country Journal
- Low-Fat & Fast
- Natural Remedies
- Vegetarian Times

=== Collectibles ===
- Doll Reader
- Figurines & Collectibles
- Nautical World (formerly Nautical Collector)
- Teddy Bear and Friends

=== History magazines ===
Eight of the history magazines subsequently published by Weider History Group starting around 2006.

- America's Civil War
- American History
- Aviation History
- British Heritage
- Civil War Times Illustrated
- Columbiad
- Early American Homes (formerly Early American Life)
- Historic Traveler
- MHQ: The Quarterly Journal of Military History
- Military History
- Vietnam Magazine
- Wild West
- Women's History (annual)
- World War II

=== Hunting ===
- Bowhunter
- Fly Fisherman

=== Recreation ===
- Dressage & CT
- Horse & Rider
- KITPLANES
- Practical Horseman
- Southwest Art

== Former television stations ==
City of License / Market	Station	Channel	Years owned	Current status
Daytona Beach–Orlando, FL	WESH-TV	2	1965–1985	NBC affiliate owned by Hearst Television
Honolulu, HI	KHON-TV ^{1}	2	1979–1985	Fox affiliate owned by Nexstar Media Group
Moline–Rock Island, IL–Davenport, IA	WQAD-TV	8	1978–1985	ABC affiliate owned by Tegna Inc.
Louisville, KY	WDRB	41	1977–1983	Fox affiliate owned by Block Communications
Des Moines, IA	KRNT-TV/KCCI	8	1955–1985 ^{2}	CBS affiliate owned by Hearst Television
Sioux City, IA	KVTV	9	1953–1957	ABC affiliate KCAU-TV, owned by Nexstar Media Group
Wichita–Hutchinson, KS	KTVH	12	1955–1983	CBS affiliate KWCH-DT, owned by Gray Media
Memphis, TN	WREC-TV	3	1962–1971	CBS affiliate WREG-TV, owned by Nexstar Media Group
Huntington–Charleston, WV	WHTN-TV	13	1956–1960	CBS affiliate WOWK-TV, owned by Nexstar Media Group

Notes:

- ^{1} Cowles also owned KHON-TV's satellite in Wailuku, KAII-TV. Another KHON-TV satellite, KHAW-TV in Hilo, was owned by a third party but leased to Cowles. The Hawaii stations were NBC affiliates under Cowles.
- ^{2} Cowles owned a majority share of this station when it first signed on and became its sole owner shortly thereafter.

=== Gallery ===
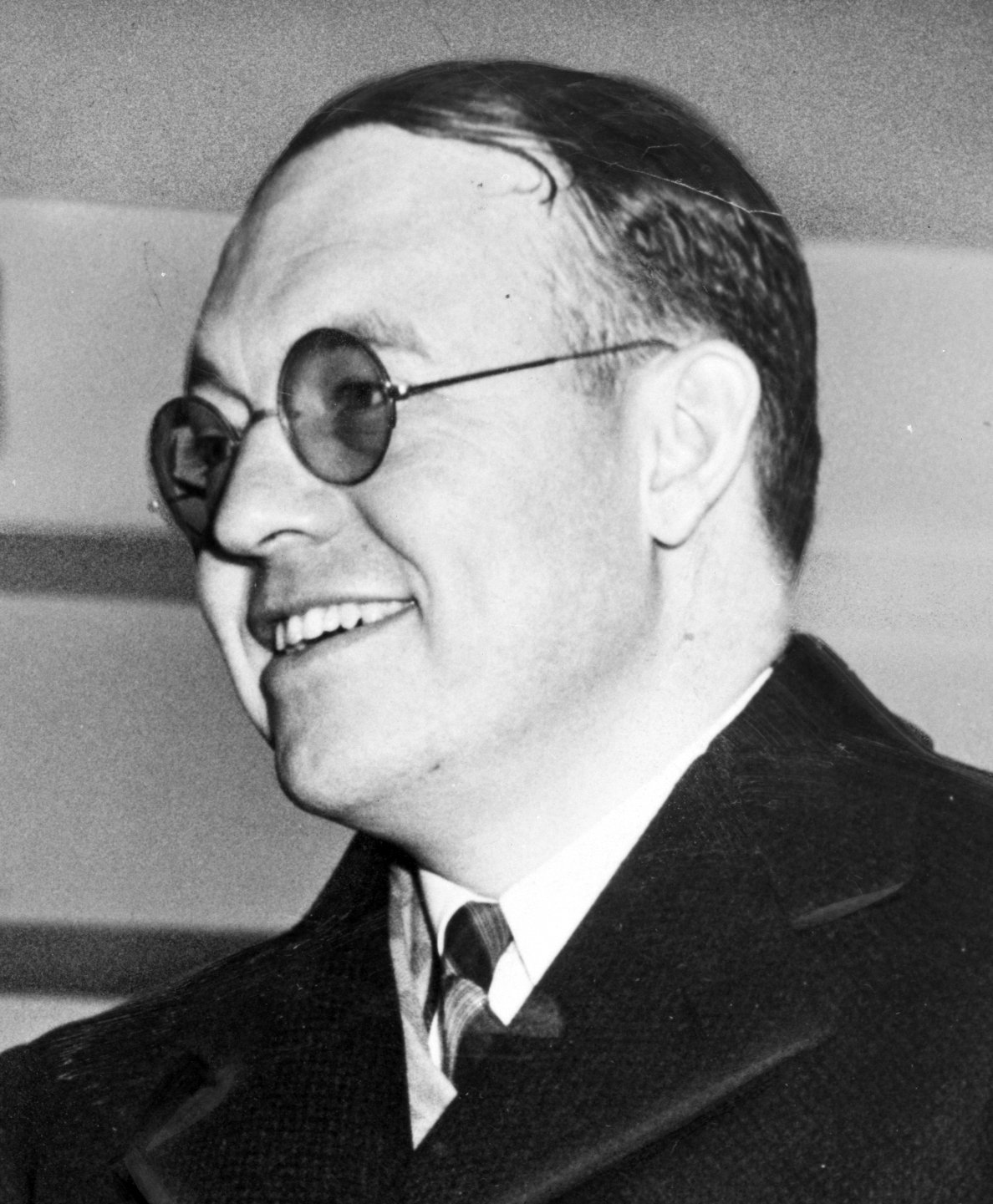
John Cowles Sr.

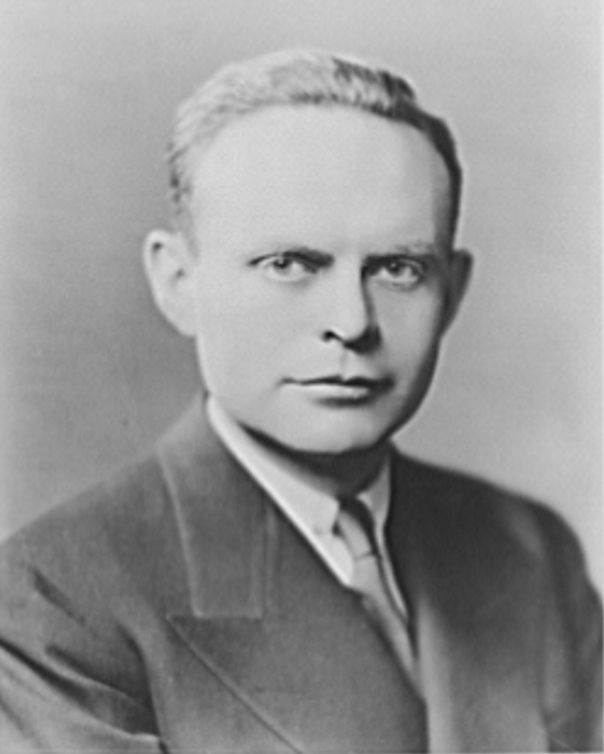
Mike Cowles

== See also ==
- Cowles Company
- King Features Syndicate
- Office of War Information
- Rent Group
- Simba Information
- The Des Moines Register
