= Sec Taylor =

American sportswriter (1887–1965)

Willis Garner "Sec" Taylor (January 20, 1887 – February 26, 1965) was a sports reporter in Des Moines, Iowa from 1914 until 1965.

== Early life ==
Willis Garner "Sec" Taylor was born in Wichita, Kansas on January 20, 1887. He originally signed his name W. Garner Taylor, but he feared that it sounded pretentious. Accordingly, he went by the name Garner W. Taylor throughout his career. His readers and friends called him "Sec" Taylor, which was the name most associated with him.

A lifelong sports fan, he played quarterback on his high school football team. He also played high school baseball and basketball, and later played semi-professional basketball.

== Sportswriting career ==
Taylor began his career as a sportswriter in his hometown of Wichita, Kansas. He got his start with the Wichita Beacon in 1905. He was paid $5 per week. Twice he gave up his job at the Beacon to attend college, but each time he returned to journalism after just a few weeks in school. He later worked for the Wichita Eagle, the St. Joseph Gazette, and the Chicago Blade.

While he lived in St. Joseph, Missouri, he worked as a secretary for a local baseball team, during which he acquired the nickname "Sec."

In 1914 he moved to Des Moines, Iowa to become the sports editor of the Des Moines Register. He would work for the Register for the next 51 years. John Cowles, Sr. persuaded Taylor to start a regular sports column for the Register. Taylor's column was titled "Sittin' In with the Athletes," and it eventually became one of the most popular sports columns in the country. When Taylor entered the newspaper business, most sports writers served as little more than public relations officials for local boxing promoters and sports team owners. Taylor saw his job differently. He brought to his column a focus on objectivity and a commitment to reporting facts. Along with the famous sports writer Grantland Rice of the New York Tribune, Sec Taylor helped usher in a new era of independent-minded, fact-based sports writing. Other writers that followed in the same tradition included Red Smith, Halsey Hall, W.C. Heinz, and Shirley Povich.

Taylor covered more than 40 World Series during his sports writing career. A highly talented reporter, he nevertheless missed one of the biggest baseball stories ever. Taylor got a tip that the Chicago White Sox planned to fix the 1919 World Series, but he failed to follow up on it, a decision that he always regretted. Baseball remained his favorite sport throughout his life. Although he was not based in a city with a Major League team, he covered Major League baseball games across the country on behalf of the Des Moines Register. Taylor routinely traveled by train with the teams, which enabled him to get to know executives, managers, and players throughout Major League baseball. He became so well known that E.R. "Salty" Saltwell, a Chicago Cubs executive, expressed amazement at how often he was asked by players and team officials, "Hey, do you know Sec Taylor? How's Sec?"

Taylor wrote about a wide range of sports besides baseball. In a national poll of sportswriters, he correctly predicted that Joe Louis would defeat James Braddock in their 1937 world heavyweight championship bout at Comiskey Park. Taylor co-founded the Football Writers Association of America in 1941. He also served as its president. In 1957 Taylor received the Grantland Rice Memorial Award for excellence in sports writing.

In addition to his sports writing duties, Sec Taylor served as a Director of the Des Moines Register and Tribune Company. As Kenneth MacDonald, the Register's long-time editor and publisher, observed: "Sec's reputation for integrity was unquestioned."

== Officiating career ==
Sports writing was Taylor's principal career, but he also worked as an official for college basketball and football games. Renowned for his objectivity and fairness, he officiated games in the Big Ten Conference, the Missouri Valley Conference, the Big Six Conference, and the Big Seven Conference. After officiating games, he often wrote the stories on them for the next day's edition of the Register. He also refereed boxing and wrestling matches in Iowa and Missouri.

Taylor served as the Field Judge for the 1940 Chicago Charities College All-Star Game at Soldier Field between the NFL champion Green Bay Packers and an all-star team of college football players. At a time of racial segregation, the 1940 All Star game was notable because it was racially integrated, and included UCLA star tailback Kenny Washington.

Besides officiating games, Taylor also served as a consultant to the Big Ten and the Pacific Coast conferences.

== Minor League Baseball in Des Moines ==
Taylor played a leading role in minor league baseball's long history in Des Moines. Professional baseball had deep roots in the city, dating back to teams like the Des Moines Prohibitionists, who played in the Western Association in the 1880s and 1890s.

When Sec Taylor arrived in 1914, the Des Moines Boosters were a fixture of the Western League. In 1925 the Des Moines Demons became the city's baseball club in the Western League. On May 2, 1930, the Demons made history when they hosted one of the first night games played under permanent lights in professional baseball history. General Electric provided the artificial lights on stanchions placed around Holcomb Park, the team's home field, which was located on the city's north side at the intersection of Holcomb Avenue and 6th Avenue. Over 12,000 people attended the first game played under the lights, and NBC Radio broadcast the game live from Holcomb Park. Sec Taylor covered the game. The next day in the Register, he wrote, "Baseball was played successfully after dark on an illuminated field and the Demons won 13-6 in a contest that was normal in every respect so far as the playing was concerned."

But in 1937 the city lost its minor league baseball club when the Des Moines Demons folded as a result of the Western League's collapse. To attract a new team, Taylor spent years campaigning on behalf of the construction of a new ballpark, which culminated in the opening of Pioneer Memorial Stadium in 1947. Crucially, he also helped persuade the Chicago Cubs to take on the Des Moines Bruins as their minor league affiliate in the newly re-established Western League.

The Bruins played at Pioneer Memorial Stadium from 1947 to 1958. In 1959 a revived version of the Des Moines Demons replaced the Bruins as the city's minor league franchise. The Demons served as the Philadelphia Phillies farm club in the Three-I League.

By order of the Des Moines City Council, Pioneer Memorial Stadium was renamed "Sec Taylor Stadium" on September 1, 1959. Representatives of many Major League Baseball teams attended the naming ceremony, as well as the boxing champion Jack Dempsey. A long-time friend of Taylor, Dempsey said, "I'd have gone anywhere in the world to pay tribute to Sec. He's one of the grandest men that ever lived. He always said the right thing -the truth."

When told that the stadium would be renamed in his honor, Taylor said, "It is the greatest thing that has come to me in my life. I don't feel I'm deserving but being human, I like it."

== Death ==
Sec Taylor died of a heart attack in his hotel room in Miami, Florida on February 26, 1965, while covering Major League Baseball's spring training. He was 78 years old. Maury White, Taylor's colleague at the Des Moines Register, observed after Taylor's death: "At 78, many men have outlived most of their friends. 'Sec' never stopped making new friends." Reverend James W. Lenhart of Plymouth Congregational Church presided at the funeral service.

== Family and legacy ==
Sec Taylor and his wife, Hazel, had two sons: Rex and Garner Jr.

The minor league stadium in Des Moines is now home to the Iowa Cubs, the AAA club of the Chicago Cubs. Although the stadium was renamed Principal Park in 2004, the playing field is still named Sec Taylor Field. Besides the Iowa Cubs, Sec Taylor Field also hosts the Iowa State High School Baseball Tournament.
