= Barbara McLachlan =

American politician

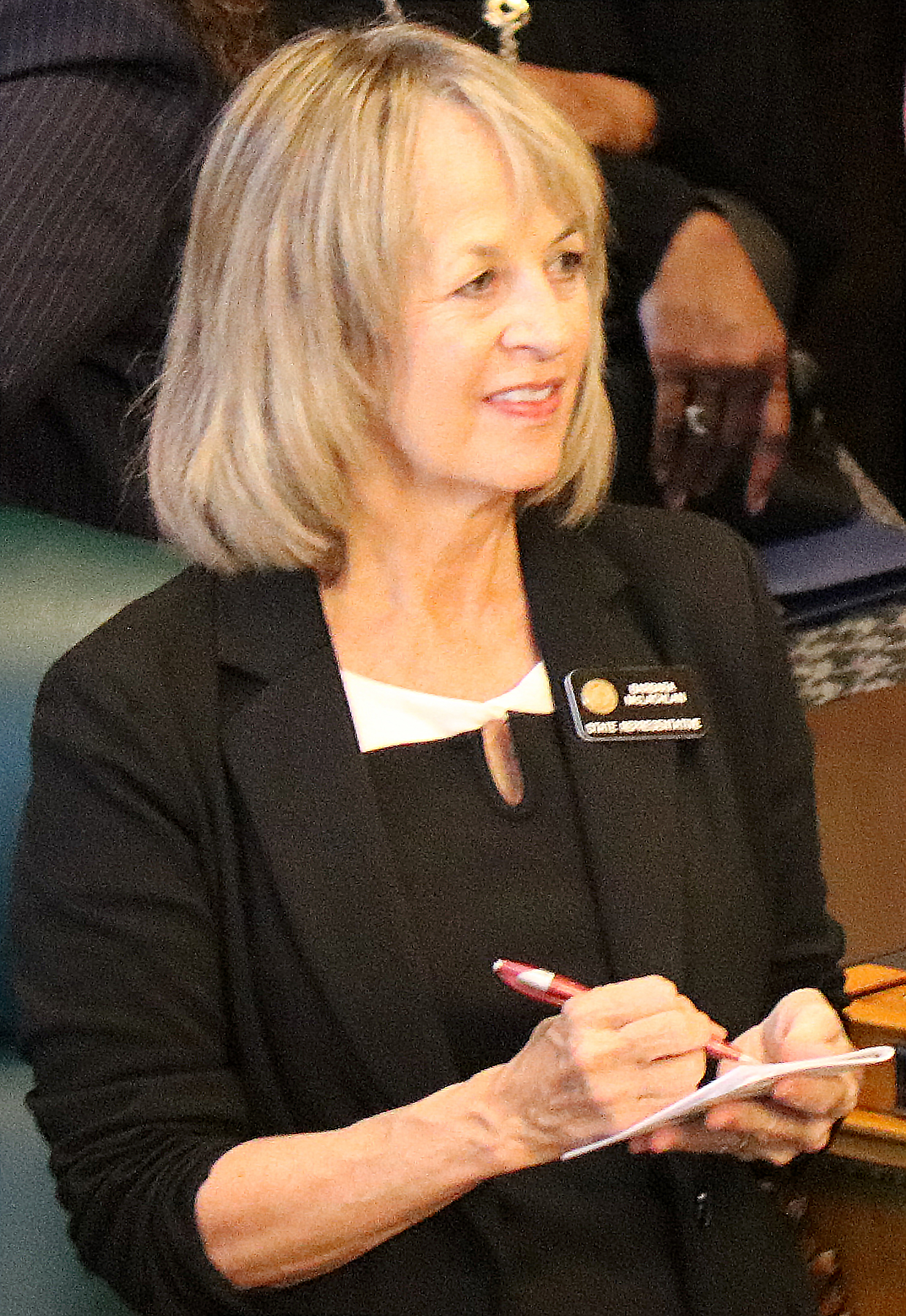

Member of the Colorado House of Representatives from the 59th district
- In office January 11, 2017 – January 8, 2025
- Preceded by: J. Paul Brown
- Succeeded by: Katie Stewart

Personal details
- Born: Lakewood, Colorado, U.S.
- Party: Democratic
- Spouse: Mike McLachlan
- Education: Colorado State University (BA); Fort Lewis College (BA); Regis University (MEd)

Barbara McLachlan is an American politician, educator, and former journalist serving as a member of the Colorado House of Representatives. She represents District 59, which covers Archuleta, La Plata, San Juan, and part of Montezuma counties.

== Early life and education ==
Hall McLachlan was born in Lakewood, Colorado. She received a bachelor's degree in journalism from Colorado State University, a bachelor's degree in English from Fort Lewis College, a master's degree in learning and teaching from Regis University, and a certificate in college counseling from the University of California, Los Angeles.

== Career ==
Prior to entering politics, McLachlan worked as a Durango High School and as an independent college consultant. She had previously worked as a journalist for the Durango Herald.

McLachlan was elected to the Colorado House of Representatives in 2016, winning with 50.73% of the vote over incumbent Republican J. Paul Brown. McLachlan serves on the House Education Committee and the House Transportation & Energy Committee. She is the chair of the House Education Committee.

== Personal life ==
Her husband, Mike McLachlan, had previously served in the Colorado House of Representatives. She lives in Durango, Colorado and has two children.
