= Times-News (Idaho) =

Newspaper in Twin Falls, Idaho, United States

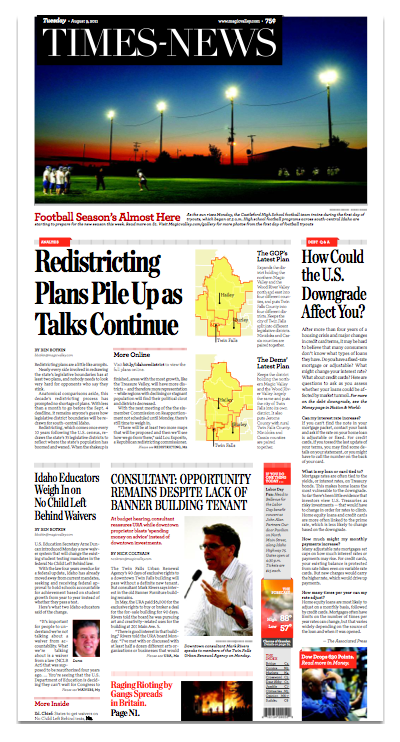
- Type: Daily newspaper
- Format: Broadsheet
- Owner: Lee Enterprises
- Founder(s): Charles Diehl; O. H. Barber
- Publisher: Matt Sandberg
- Managing editor: Mychel Matthews
- Founded: 1904
- Language: English
- Headquarters: 132 Fairfield Street West, Twin Falls, Idaho, 83303
- Circulation: 9,270 Daily (as of 2023)
- OCLC number: 12292697
- Website: magicvalley.com

The Times-News is a US daily newspaper serving the Twin Falls, Idaho area. The paper is owned by Lee Enterprises and is available throughout the Magic Valley region of south-central Idaho as well as in parts of Elko County, Nevada, as far south as Wells.

== History ==
The Twin Falls News was first published on Oct. 28, 1904 by Charles Diehl and O. H. Barber. Their partnership soon dissolved and Barber left on Feb. 3, 1905 and launched the Twin Falls Times on March 23, 1905.

George A. Fraser edited and managed the News until 1910. He was followed by several others. News editor Karl. H. Dixon sold his interests in 1912 to Carl. G. Anderson. In 1913, the News was purchased by J. F. Melvin and A. D. Milligan, who owned the Twin Falls Daily Press. The Press folded two months later and the News returned to its previous owner. Roy A. Read took the helm of the News and at some point got a controlling-interest in the business.

In March 1907, Wilbur S. Hill purchased the Times from Frank Eastman and Charles Collis. Hill sold it in January 1916 to C. O. Langley, Daniel Denton and Harold Sims. In 1921, the Times went bankrupt and was bought by J. A. Crumb, who resold it a year later to Ira H. Masters, who later became Secretary of State of Idaho. Masters published Times until 1927. It was then briefly owned by two men from Montana followed by a partnership formed by three Oregon men: Lee D. Drake, E. B. Aldrich and F. W. Lampkiin. They renamed the paper to the Idaho Evening Times.

On April 1, 1930, H. G. Kruse purchased the Times. Shortly after he died in a car crash and his son-in-law Emil Bordewick and R. S. Tofflemire became co-owners in 1932. On Jan. 1, 1937, Tofflemire and Bordewick purchased the Twin Falls Daily News from Read. On Feb. 16, 1942, the Times and the News merged to form the Times-News. The papers were combined to help conserve resources during World War II.

In 1961, Tofflemire and Bordewick sold the paper to Jared How. In 1968, Howard Publications acquired the Time-News from How, and in 2002 sold it to Lee Enterprises. In 2008, the South Idaho Press, of Burley, was absorbed into the Times-News. In 2023, the paper reduced it print days to three: Tuesday, Thursday and Saturday. Also, it switched from carrier to mail delivery.
