= J. Paul Brown =

American politician

Member of the Colorado House of Representatives from the 59th district
- In office 2015–2017
- Preceded by: Mike McLachlan
- Succeeded by: Barbara McLachlan
- In office 2010–2012
- Succeeded by: Mike McLachlan

Personal details
- Born: February 28, 1953 (age 73)
- Party: Republican
- Education: New Mexico State University (BS)

J. Paul Brown (born February 28, 1953) is an American businessman, rancher, and politician who served as a member of the Colorado House of Representatives for the 59th district from 2015 to 2017. A Republican, Brown was defeated for re-election in 2016 by Barbara McLachlan.

== Early life and education ==
Brown was born in the Four Corners region. He earned a Bachelor of Science degree in animal science from New Mexico State University in 1975.

== Career ==
Brown was elected to the Colorado House of Representatives in 2010. He was defeated for re-election in 2012, and succeeded by Mike McLachlan. He defeated McLachlan in 2014 and regained his seat, serving until 2017. He was defeated for re-election by McLauchlan's wife, Barbara McLachlan. Brown also served as a commissioner of La Plata County, and on the Ignacio, Colorado school board.

== Personal life ==
Brown and his wife, Debbie, have four children.

The Browns are sheep ranchers.
