= Lois Cowles Harrison =

American civic leader and woman's rights activist (1934 – 2013)

- Born: Lois Cowles; June 23, 1934; Des Moines, Iowa, U.S.
- Died: June 6, 2013 (aged 78); Lakeland, Florida, U.S.
- Education: Madeira School
- Alma mater: Wellesley College, 1956
- Occupations: civic leader, women's rights activist, and philanthropist
- Spouses: John R. Harrison; Homer Hooks (m. 1979)
- Children: 4
- Parent(s): Gardner Cowles Jr. and Lois Thornburgh

Lois Cowles Harrison (June 23, 1934 – June 6, 2013) was a civic leader, women's rights activist, and philanthropist.

== Early life and education ==
Lois Cowles was born in Des Moines, Iowa, daughter of Gardner Cowles Jr., co-founder and publisher of Look Magazine, and Lois Thornburg.

She graduated from Madeira School in Washington, D.C., and then from Wellesley College in Boston in 1956.

== Civic leadership ==
Harrison moved to Polk County, Florida, because her family owned a chain of newspapers in the state.

From 1974 to 1978, Harrison was a member of the Florida Ethics Commission, and in 1975, she was appointed to the Governor's Commission on the Status of Women. In the 1970s, Harrison chaired the National League of Women Voters' ERA Committee, and in 1977 she was appointed by Governor Reubin Askew to Florida's Status of Women Commission, Ethics Commission, and Florida Constitution Revision Commission. Harrison was president of the Polk County League of Women Voters, and was on the board of the National League of Women Voters. Harrison also served as president of Planned Parenthood of Florida.

The Lois Cowles Harrison Center for the Visual and Performing Arts in Lakeland was named for her in 1989.

In 2011, the Polk County League of Women Voters presented her with an "Influential Woman of the 20th Century" award.

== Death and legacy ==
Harrison died at Lakeland Regional Health Medical Center after suffering a heart attack. She was 78.

In February 2014, a sculpture was erected in her honor at the Lois Cowles Harrison Center for the Visual and Performing Arts.
