= Gardner Cowles Sr. =

American banker, publisher, and politician (1861–1946)

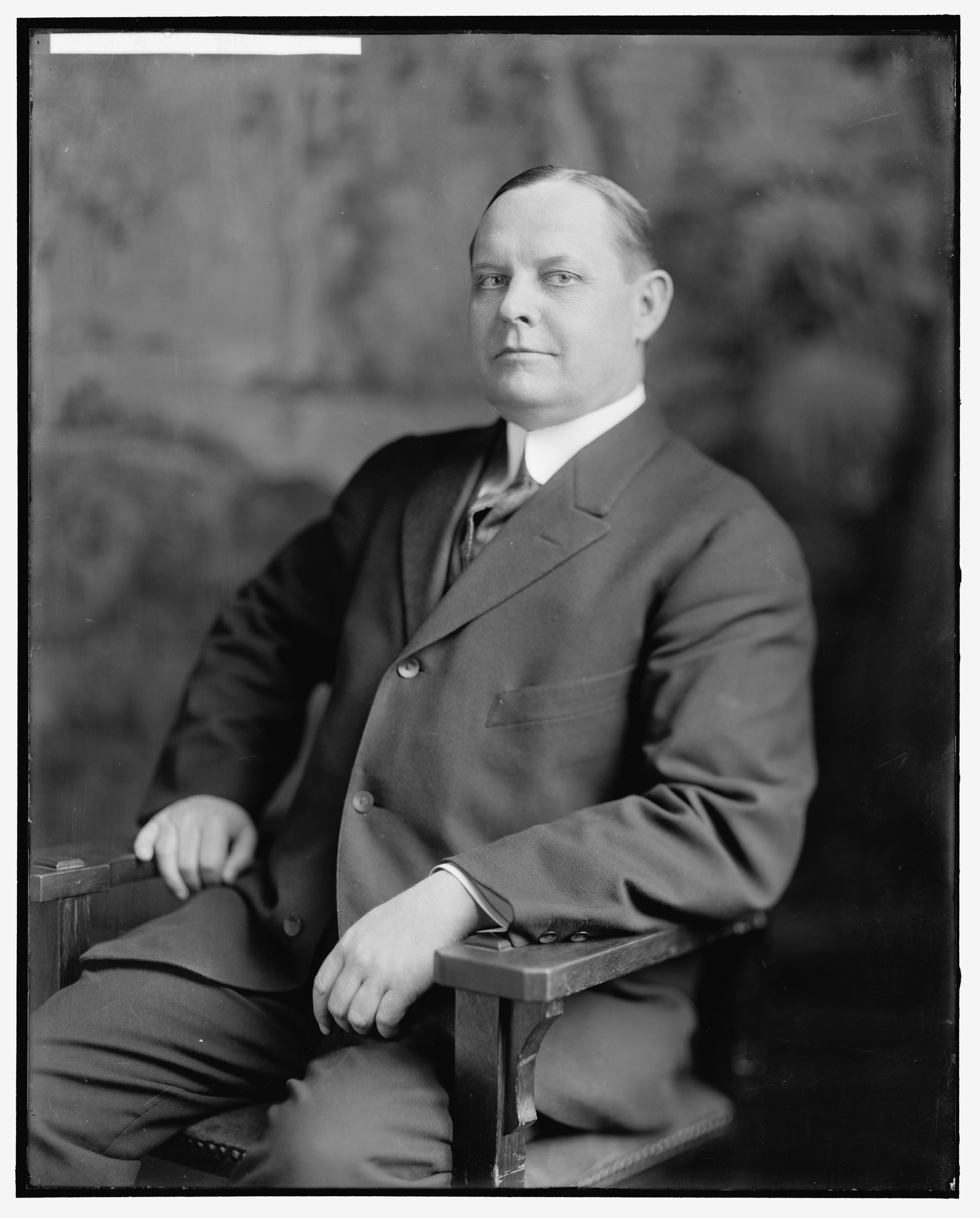
- Born: February 28, 1861; Oskaloosa, Iowa, U.S.
- Died: February 28, 1946 (aged 85); Des Moines, Iowa, U.S.
- Education: Penn College; Grinnell College; Wesleyan College
- Occupations: banker, publisher, and politician
- Known for: The Des Moines Register owner
- Political party: Republican
- Spouse: Florence Call (m. 1883)
- Children: Russell Cowles (1887–1979), John Cowles Sr. (1898–1983), Gardner "Mike" Cowles Jr. (1903–1982), Bertha, Florence, Helen
- Parent(s): William Fletcher Cowles and Maria Elizabeth LaMonte

Gardner Cowles Sr. (1861–1946) was an American banker, publisher, and politician. He was the owner of The Des Moines Register and the Des Moines Tribune.

== Biography ==
Cowles father was a descendant of Hannah Bushoup (c. 1613–1683) of Hartford, Connecticut, and John Cowles (1598–1675) of Gloucestershire, England. His father William Fletcher Cowles was a Methodist minister and widower who had three prior children; his mother was Maria Elizabeth LaMonte. Gardner had a full brother named LaMonte.

After graduating from college, Cowles settled in Algona, Iowa, becoming superintendent of schools there and acquiring partial ownership of the Algona Republican newspaper. Becoming a businessman, he was a stockholder and officer in ten area Iowa banks and also a large-scale farmer.

Cowles served as a Republican in the Iowa House of Representatives from 1899 to 1903 as representative from Kossuth County.

In 1903, he and Harvey Ingham purchased the Des Moines Register and Leader; the name became The Des Moines Register in 1915. Moving to Des Moines, Cowles also acquired the Des Moines Tribune in 1908. (The Tribune, which merged with the rival Des Moines News in 1924 and the Des Moines Capital [previously also acquired by Cowles] in 1927, served as the evening paper for the Des Moines area until it ended publication on September 25, 1982.) Under the ownership of the Cowles family, the Register became Iowa's largest and most influential newspaper, eventually adopting the slogan "The Newspaper Iowa Depends Upon." Newspapers were distributed to all four corners of the state by train and later by truck as Iowa's highway system was improving.

Cowles was a delegate to the 1916 Republican National Convention. In 1932 he served in the administration of President Herbert Hoover. He was an advocate of progressive Republicanism.

Before his death he established the Gardner Cowles Foundation to support Iowa colleges and charities; one of his gifts was a library building at Drake University.

Cowles' oldest son Russell was a well-known landscape painter; his sons John Cowles Sr. and Gardner "Mike" Cowles Jr. co-founded Look magazine and ran the Cowles Media Company (established in 1935).
