= South Idaho Press =

Newspaper published in Burley, Idaho

- Type: Daily newspaper
- Format: Broadsheet
- Owner: Lee Enterprises
- Founder: S. D. Parke
- Founded: 1905 (as Burley Bulletin)
- Ceased publication: August 2008
- Language: English
- Headquarters: 230 E. Main St. Burley, Idaho 83318; United States
- OCLC number: 12292672
- Website: www.magicvalley.com

The South Idaho Press was a U.S. daily newspaper serving Minidoka County and Cassia County in south-central Idaho. It changed names over the years after several mergers while it was published from 1905 to 2008.

== History ==
In 1905, S. D. Parke established the Burley Bulletin. In 1915, a rival paper in Burley called the Amusement Herald was founded by A. W. Brose and James T. Fray. Brose changed the name to the Burley Herald after a few issues.

Parke edited and published the weekly Burley Bulletin newspaper until 1923 when he sold it to W. C. Abbott. By 1924, the Bulletin was owned by Henry Dworshak and his son. The duo operated the paper for nearly two decades. In 1927, Brose sold the Burley Herald to Walter A. Shear and Riley Emmons. In 1931, Emmons sold his half-interest to Robert "Bob" H. Hinkley.

In 1944, Dworshak, along with Shear and Hinkley, sold their papers to The Mist Publishing Company, of St. Helens, Oregon. The business was owned by Jessica L. Longston and Mr. and Mrs. A. T. Brownlow, all publishers of the St Helens Sentenl-Mist. In 1950, the Bulletin and Herald merged to form the Herald-Bulletin. In 1959, the paper expanded into a daily. In 1961, Longston sold the paper to Dean S. Lesher. Six years later a court ordered the paper returned to Longston over a contract dispute. She then immediately re-sold the Herald-Bulletin to Sheldon F. Sackett who renamed it to The World.

In 1968, Sackett sold The World to Lloyd "Holly" Hollinger of Hollinger Newspaper Inc. (not to be confused with Hollinger Inc.). The paper was then merged with the Reminder Morning News to form the South Idaho Press. In 1977, Hollinger sold the Press to The Great Fall Tribune Company, which was owned by the Cowles family.

In 1987, Cowles Media Company sold the paper to Park Communications. In 1997, Media General acquired Park Communications and then sold the Press to Community Newspaper Holdings. The Press was resold again a year later to Liberty Group Publishing in 1998, who operated it for six years until sell the paper to Lee Enterprises in 2004. In 2008, Lee merged the Press into the Times-News.

== External links and references ==
- http://www.magicvalley.com
