= One World (Willkie book) =

Manifesto and travelogue by Wendell Willkie

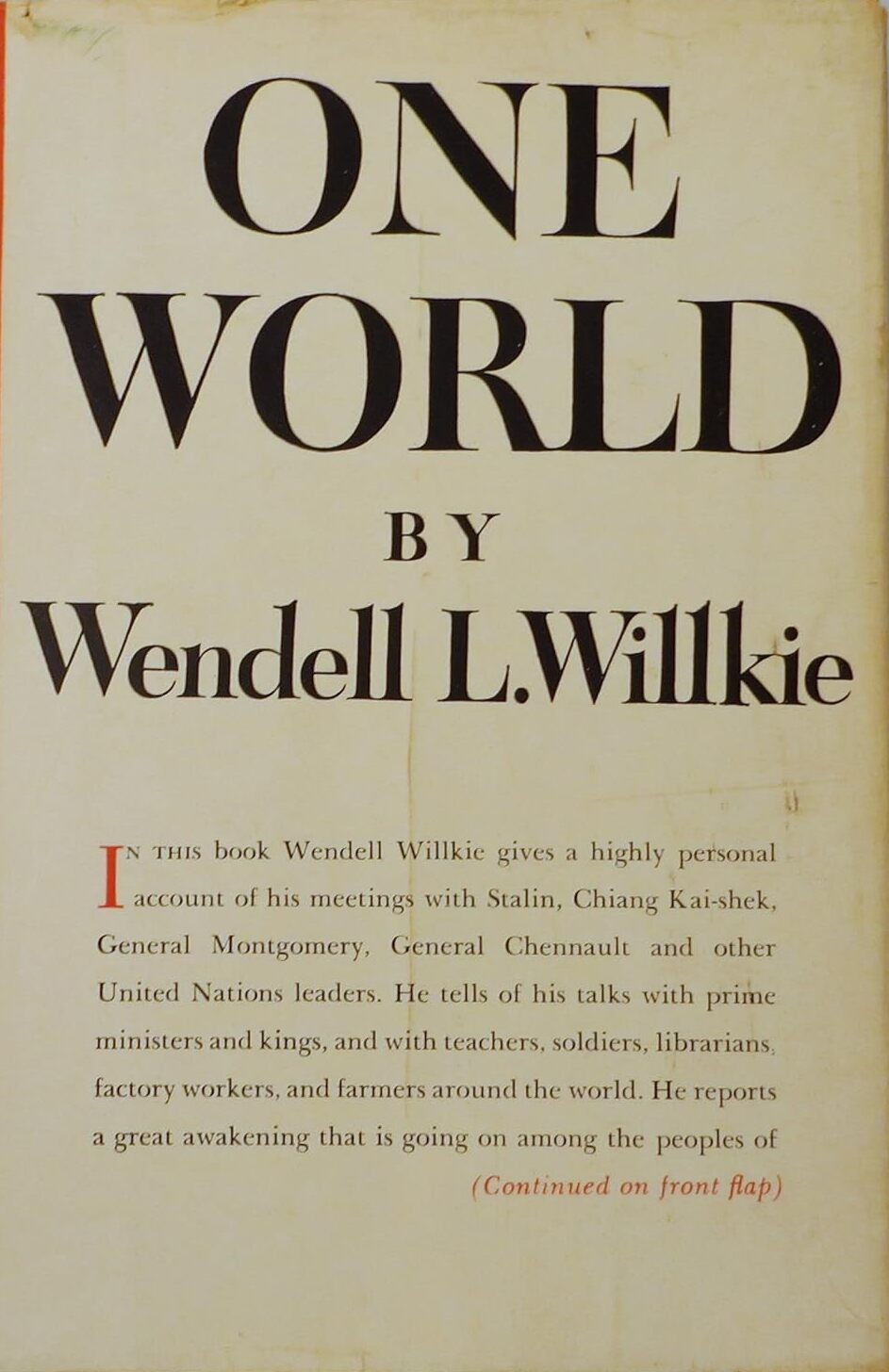
- First edition (publ. Simon & Schuster)
- Author: Wendell Willkie
- Language: English
- Genre: Nonfiction, travelogue
- Publisher: Simon & Schuster
- Publication date: 1943
- Publication place: United States
- Media type: Print (hardback)
- Pages: 206

One World is a manifesto and travelogue written by Wendell Willkie, a liberal Republican, about his seven-week, 31,000-mile tour. Originally published in April 1943, it advocates for an end to colonialism, and promotes both world federalism and equality for non-whites in the United States.

One World inspired the One World movement and the World Federalist Movement — which included among its supporters Albert Einstein, Mahatma Gandhi, Jawaharlal Nehru —and advocated strong and democratic super-national institutions. That wave of thinking foretold the postwar international order, including the United Nations System, but was also very critical of the postwar order and the UN, claiming it is insufficient to avoid another world war.

Willkie was accompanied on his tour by, among others, the publisher and editor Gardner Cowles, Jr., who ultimately assisted Willkie in the writing of One World (which was edited by Irita Van Doren).

== Content of the book ==
It is a document of his world travels and meetings with many of the Allies' heads of state as well as ordinary citizens and soldiers in locales such as El Alamein, Russia, and Iran. The main idea of the book is that the world became one small inter-connected unit and Isolationism is no longer possible:

When you fly around the world in 49 days, you learn that the world has become small not only on the map, but also in the minds of men. All around the world, there are some ideas which millions and millions of men hold in common, almost as much as if they lived in the same town.

"There are no distant points in the world any longer." What concerns "myriad millions of human beings" abroad, concerns the Americans. "Our thinking in the future must be world-wide."

If our withdrawal from world affairs after the last war was a contributing factor to the present war and to the economic instability of the past 20 years—and it seems plain that it was—a withdrawal from the problems and responsibilities of the world after this war would be a sheer disaster. Even our relative geographic isolation no longer exists... At the end of the last war, not a single plane had flown across the Atlantic. Today that ocean is a mere ribbon, with airplanes making regular scheduled flights. The Pacific is only a slightly wider ribbon in the ocean of the air, and Europe and Asia are at our very doorstep.

To win the peace, "we must now plan for peace on a world basis" and "play an active, constructive part in freeing and keeping" this peace. By "peace on world basis" he meant:

When I say that peace must be planned on a world basis, I mean quite literally that it must embrace the earth. Continents and oceans are plainly only parts of a whole, seen, as I have seen them, from the air ... And it is inescapable that there can be no peace for any part of the world unless the foundations of peace are made secure throughout all parts of the world.

Willkie emphasized that across the world the "reservoir of goodwill" towards the United States is much larger than towards other contemporary powers:

I found this dread of foreign control everywhere. The fact that we are not associated with it in men's minds has caused people to go much farther in their approval of us than I dared to imagine. I was amazed to discover how keenly the world is aware of the fact that we do not seek—anywhere, in any region—to impose our rule upon others or to exact special privileges ... No other Western nation has such a reservoir. Ours must be used to unify the peoples of the earth in the human quest for freedom and justice.

The world, he argued, is ready for this sort of world government.

Willkie anticipated military and economic integration of West Europe after the war: "The re-creation of the small countries of Europe as political units, yes; their re-creation as economic and military units, no, if we really hope to bring stabilization to Western Europe..."

He sought to extend the Atlantic Charter beyond West Europe to all world. "That was one of the reasons why I was so greatly distressed when Mr. Churchill subsequently made his world-disturbing remark, 'We mean to hold our own. I did not become His Majesty's first minister in order to preside over the liquidation of the British Empire.'"

Willkie opposed Colonialism in general, including the American: "The British are by no means the only colonial rulers." The French, Dutch, Portuguese and Belgians are in the list. "And we ourselves have not yet promised complete freedom to all the peoples in the West Indies for whom we have assumed responsibility."

He warned on the Soviet rule over East Europe: "The failure of Mr. Stalin to announce to a worried world Russia's specific aspirations with reference to Eastern Europe weighs the scales once more against the proclaimed purposes of leaders."

Willkie was also critical of the disparity between the Atlantic Charter and the domestic American racial and anti-Semitic policies—a phenomenon he labeled "domestic imperialism."

Especially emphasized is the position of China in the world after World War II; involved in a civil war between Nationalists and Communists, Willkie prophesies that whichever power achieves victory will make China a force to be reckoned with. It is the duty of the United Nations (Note: Before the United Nations Organization was founded in 1945, the term "United Nations" had been in use since 1942 as a synonym for the Allies.)) to make sure that the power is friendly to American and other Allied interests but also that it is powerful enough to help the Chinese, the world's most populated nation.

== Popularity ==
One World "became the greatest nonfiction bestseller to date in US publishing history." It spent four months atop the New York Times bestseller list beginning in May 1943 and selling over 1.5 million copies during those four months. Harold Urey wrote of it, "Wendell Willkie left a monument more enduring than granite in the words 'One World'..." The title One World could influence the title of the famous trilogy One World or None (1946), implying that this is the alternative in the atomic age. The editor of Publishers Weekly hailed One World as a 'record-breaking non-fiction best seller,' a phenomenon 'unequaled since the days of the old blue-backed 'speller'—Noah Webster's Revolutionary-era guide to the new American English. The success of the book caught Willkie by surprise and the proceeds from the book went to war relief agencies in Britain, Russia, and China. Matthew Rozsa of Salon wrote in 2022 that the book has "an unintentionally humorous subtext" because of Willkie's rumored affair with then-Chinese First Lady Soong Meiling, who was described in the book as having "a generous and understanding heart, a gracious and beautiful manner and appearance, and a burning conviction." Rozsa added that Willkie's book is still relevant because of global issues like "the climate crisis, massive inequality, the rising threat of fascism and the threat of nuclear war."
