= Gardner Cowles Jr. =

American newspaper and magazine publisher

Gardner "Mike" Cowles Jr.
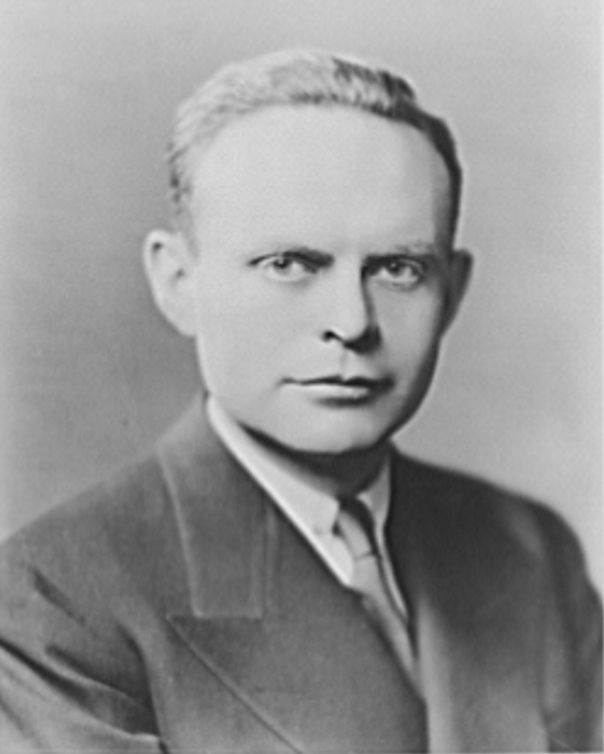
- Mike Cowles, photographed some time between 1940 and 1946
- Born: January 31, 1903; Algona, Iowa, U.S.
- Died: July 8, 1985 (aged 82); Southampton, New York, U.S.
- Education: Harvard University
- Occupation: Publisher
- Known for: Cowles Media Company
- Political party: Republican
- Spouse(s): Lois Thornburg (m. 1933; div. 1946) Fleur Cowles (m. 1946; div. 1955) Jan Hochstraser (also known as Jan Streate Cox) (m. 1956)
- Children: Lois Cowles Harrison, Kate Nichols, Gardner ("Pat") Cowles III, Jane, Virginia Kurtis, stepson Charles
- Parent(s): Gardner Cowles Sr. and Florence Call

Gardner "Mike" Cowles Jr. (1903–1985) was an American newspaper and magazine publisher. He was co-owner of the Cowles Media Company, whose assets included the Minneapolis Star, the Minneapolis Tribune, the Des Moines Register, Look magazine, and a half-interest in Harper's Magazine.

== Biography ==
Cowles was a descendant of Hannah Bushoup (c. 1613–1683) of Hartford, Connecticut, and John Cowles (1598–1675) of Gloucestershire, England. His father Gardner Cowles Sr. was a banker, publisher, and politician who purchased The Des Moines Register and the Des Moines Tribune.

Cowles Jr. was born in Algona, Iowa. He was educated at Phillips Exeter Academy and Harvard University.

He became co-owner with his brother John of the Cowles Media Company (established in 1935), and in 1937 became co-founder, co-publisher, and editor of Look magazine. He also served as executive editor of The Des Moines Register and The Des Moines Tribune.

In 1939, Mike and John, along with entrepreneur Everett M. "Busy" Arnold, became owners of the newly formed Comic Magazines, Inc., the corporate entity that would publish the Quality Comics comic book line. (Quality was an influential creative force in what historians and fans call the Golden Age of comic books).

In the 1940 Republican Party presidential primaries, Cowles and his brother supported Wendell Willkie in their newspapers and magazines. Cowles later accompanied Willkie on a world tour, and helped him write the bestseller One World.

In 1942 Cowles had been appointed to wartime duty as assistant director of the Office of War Information. His responsibilities in the OWI were to direct a domestic news bureau, coordinating information from non-military government agencies. Cowles served in the OWI under the leadership of Elmer Davis for about a year and then returned to Des Moines.

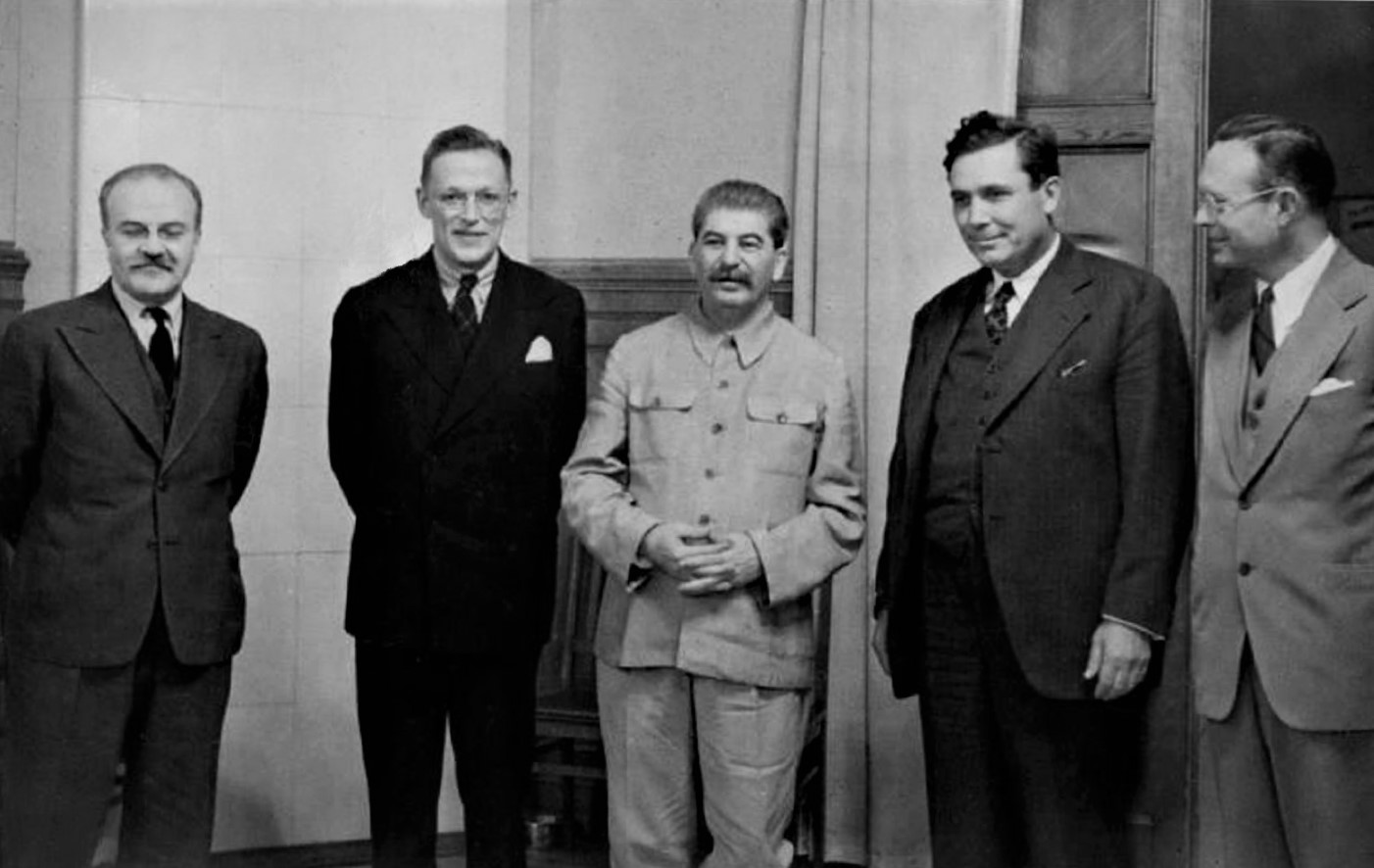
Molotov, Barnes, Stalin, Willkie and Cowles on the right

In the fall of 1942 Cowles and Barnes accompanied Willkie, who was serving as special representative of President Roosevelt, in his international tour (North Africa - Beirut - Jerusalem - Soviet Union - Siberia - China). They visited Stalin in Moscow on September 23, 1942 Returned to USA Cowles had 2-hours press conference in November 1942 and told how Stalin allegedly expressed anti-British sentiment. Stalin denied the accusation.

In his 1985 memoir Mike Looks Back Cowles claimed Willkie had asked him to cover for him during an assignation with Madame Chiang. The two had absented themselves from a banquet, Cowles said, leaving him to confront an angry generalissimo and three of his gun-wielding bodyguards—later inflated to 'sixty' in Washington gossip circles—who searched the guesthouse and found nothing.

In the 1950s, Cowles was involved with the propaganda campaign Crusade for Freedom. He was a delegate to the 1954 Bilderberg Conference, the first meeting of the conference.

In 1959 during state visit by Nikita Khrushchev to the United States Cowles asked Khrushchev about freedom of information and the jamming of radio broadcasts in the USSR.

In April 1962 Cowles had an exclusive, three-hour interview with Khrushchev in Moscow.

For a time, Cowles owned the infamous "petrified man" the Cardiff Giant, which he bought to adorn his basement rumpus room as a coffee table and conversation piece. During 1947, he sold it to the Farmers' Museum in Cooperstown, New York, where it is still displayed.

Cowles was a donor to the Gardner Cowles Foundation, an executive of the Farfield Foundation (supposedly a CIA front), and sponsor of the journal History.

== Personal life and death ==
Cowles was married to writer, editor, and artist Fleur Cowles from 1946 to 1955, ending in divorce. His daughter Lois Cowles Harrison (1934–2013) was a civic leader, women's rights activist, and philanthropist. He was married to Jan Hochstraser (also known as Jan Streate Cox) from May 1956 until his death and had a daughter Virginia and stepson Charles, an art dealer.

Cowles Jr. died at age 82 on July 8, 1985, from cardiac arrest in Southampton, New York.

His memoirs were published in 1985.
