= Principal Park =

Minor league baseball stadium in Des Moines, Iowa

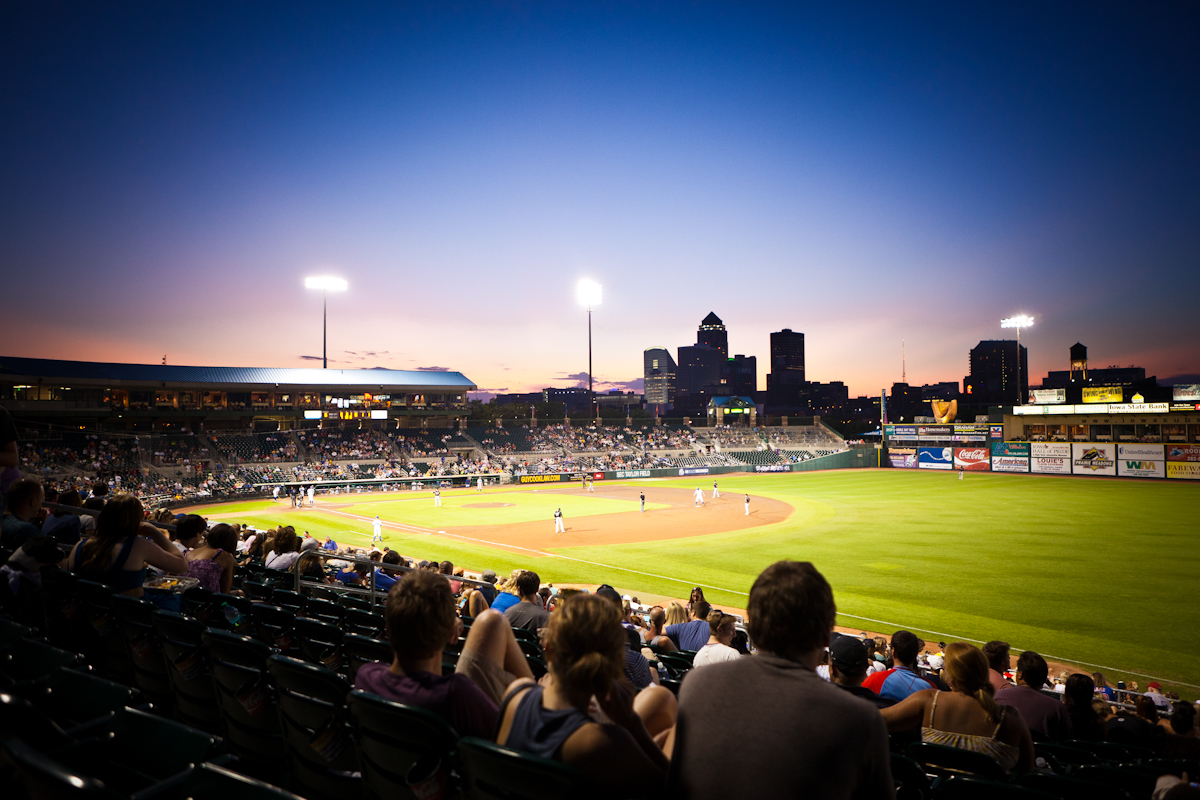

- Location within Iowa Location within the United States
- Former names: Sec Taylor Stadium (1992–2004)
- Location: 1 Line Drive; Des Moines, Iowa; United States
- Coordinates: 41°34′49″N 93°36′57″W
- Owner: City of Des Moines
- Operator: Raccoon Baseball, Inc.
- Capacity: 11,500 (2004–present); 10,800 (1992–2003)
- Surface: Grass
- Field size: Left field: 335 ft (102 m); Center field: 400 ft (120 m); Right field: 335 ft (102 m)

Construction
- Groundbreaking: September 10, 1991
- Opened: April 16, 1992
- Renovated: 2006
- Cost: US$12 million ($27.5 million in 2025 dollars)
- Architect: Populous
- Structural engineers: Shuck–Britson, Inc.
- Services engineers: Bredson & Associates, Inc.
- General contractor: Ringland Johnson Crowley Company

Tenant
- Iowa Cubs (AA/PCL/IL) 1992–present

Principal Park, formerly Sec Taylor Stadium, is a minor league baseball stadium in Des Moines, Iowa. It is the home field of the Iowa Cubs of the International League.

== Features ==
Principal Park is at the confluence of the Des Moines River and the Raccoon River in downtown Des Moines. The stadium seats 11,500 fans, with 4,088 club seats and has 45 luxury suites, 12 of which are in a building in left field that also houses the Cub Club restaurant. The Iowa State Capitol building is visible from beyond the center field fence, while some seats also provide views of the Des Moines skyline.

== History ==
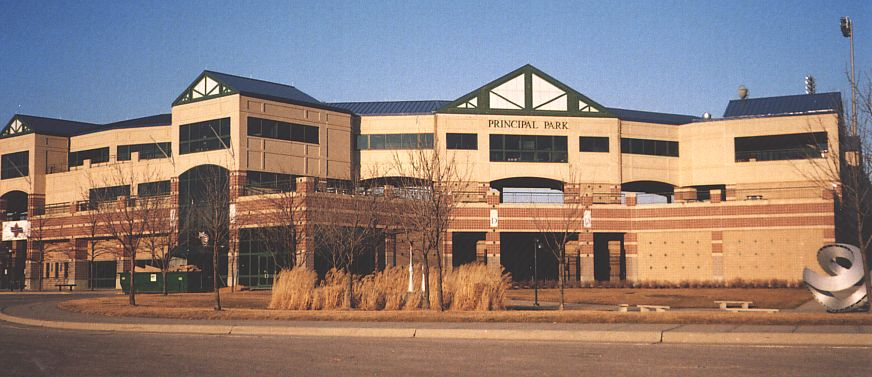
The ballpark's entrance

The first ballpark at this site was Pioneer Memorial Stadium in 1947. It was renamed Sec Taylor Stadium in honor of longtime Des Moines Register sports editor Garner "Sec" Taylor on September 2, 1959. The park served as home of the Des Moines Bruins of the Class A Western League (1947–1958) and the Des Moines Demons of the Class B Three–I League (1959–1961). It became the home of the Iowa Oaks of the American Association in 1969.

By the late 1980s, Sec Taylor Stadium was becoming run down, and was starting to develop a seedy reputation as the wooden seats and bleachers were splintering and unpainted. After Des Moines voters approved a bond issue to completely rebuild the stadium in August 1990, most of the original stadium was demolished after the 1991 season. The present facility, complete with new sky boxes, plastic seats, metal bleachers and a family picnic area, was dedicated on April 16, 1992. During part of the 1993 season, the stadium was submerged by the Great Flood of 1993, but the team still went on to win the American Association championship. The ballpark hosted the Triple-A All-Star Game in 1997. A team of American League-affiliated All-Stars defeated a team of National League-affiliated All-Stars, 5–3.

In 2004, Chicago Cubs pitchers Mark Prior and Kerry Wood—both former I-Cubs players—pitched rehabilitation starts in Des Moines and attracted sellout crowds in the process. Wood made two additional rehab starts at Principal Park on June 14, 2005 and one start on May 12, 2006.

On August 5, 2004, Sec Taylor Stadium was renamed Principal Park after the Principal Financial Group purchased the naming rights to the facility. The playing surface is still known as Sec Taylor Field. The $2.5 million deal covered part of a $6.8 million renovation project that took place during the 2005–2006 offseason. The project included the addition of over 1,000 new seats in the right field grandstand, replacement of all other seats, construction of new bleachers in right field, installation of a new scoreboard and video board, replacement of the stadium's field lighting system, and other structural changes.

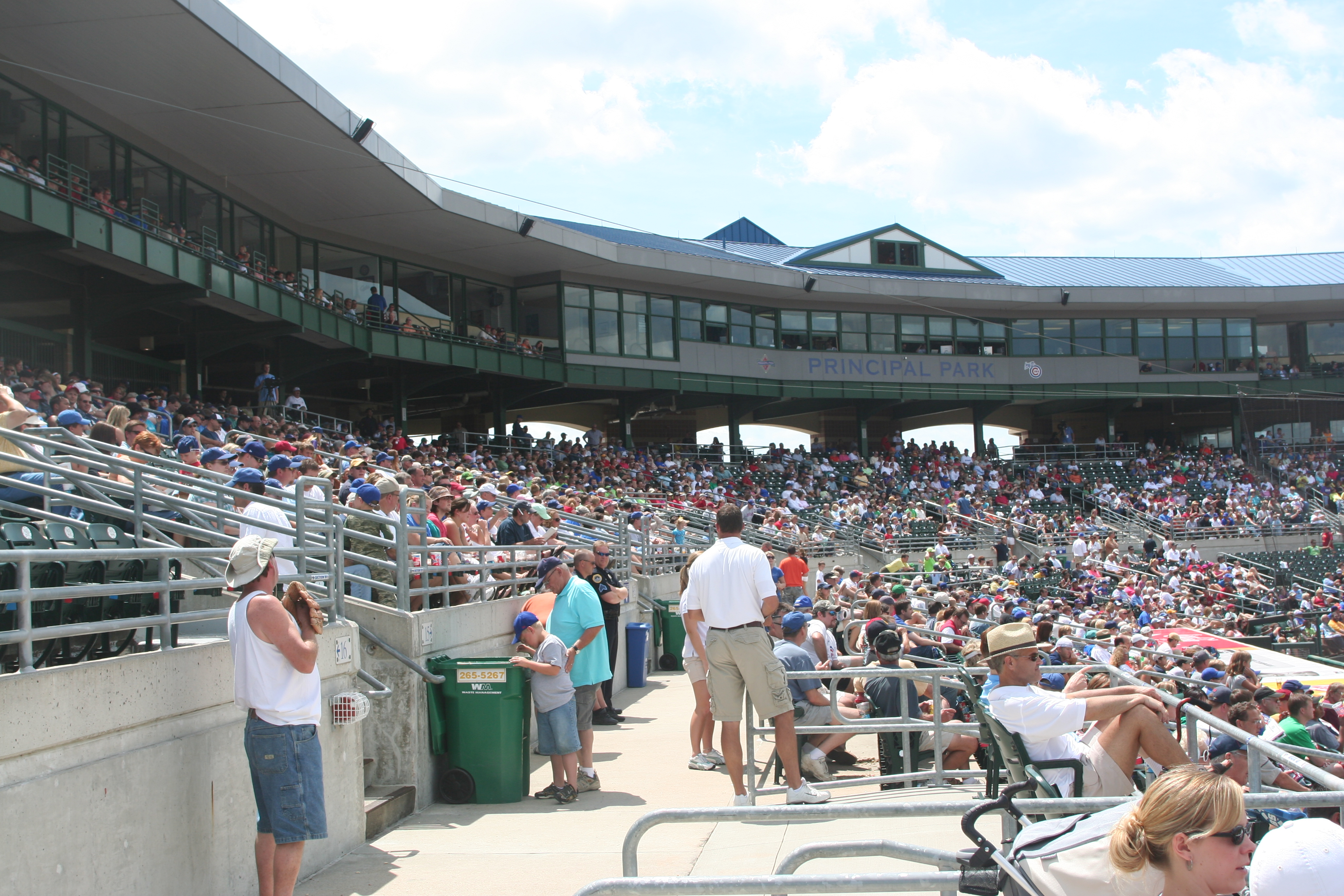
The seats behind home plate in 2009

On August 26, 2004, the ballpark hosted a concert featuring Bob Dylan and Willie Nelson.

Principal Park hosted its first Iowa High School Athletic Association state baseball tournament in 2005 and is scheduled to host the tournament through 2020.

Principal Park's single–game attendance record was set on June 8, 2007, when 15,188 fans watched an I–Cubs game against the New Orleans Zephyrs. The highest attendance for any event at the stadium was set on September 25, 2009, when a Dave Matthews Band concert brought in a sellout crowd of 18,158. On June 14, 2008, the Iowa Cubs beat the Nashville Sounds 5–4; the paid attendance was 0 due to flooding concerns in the downtown Des Moines area.

The stadium hosted live watch parties during the 2015 and 2016 playoff runs for the parent Chicago Cubs, the latter resulting in the franchise's first World Series championship in 108 years.

== Renovations ==
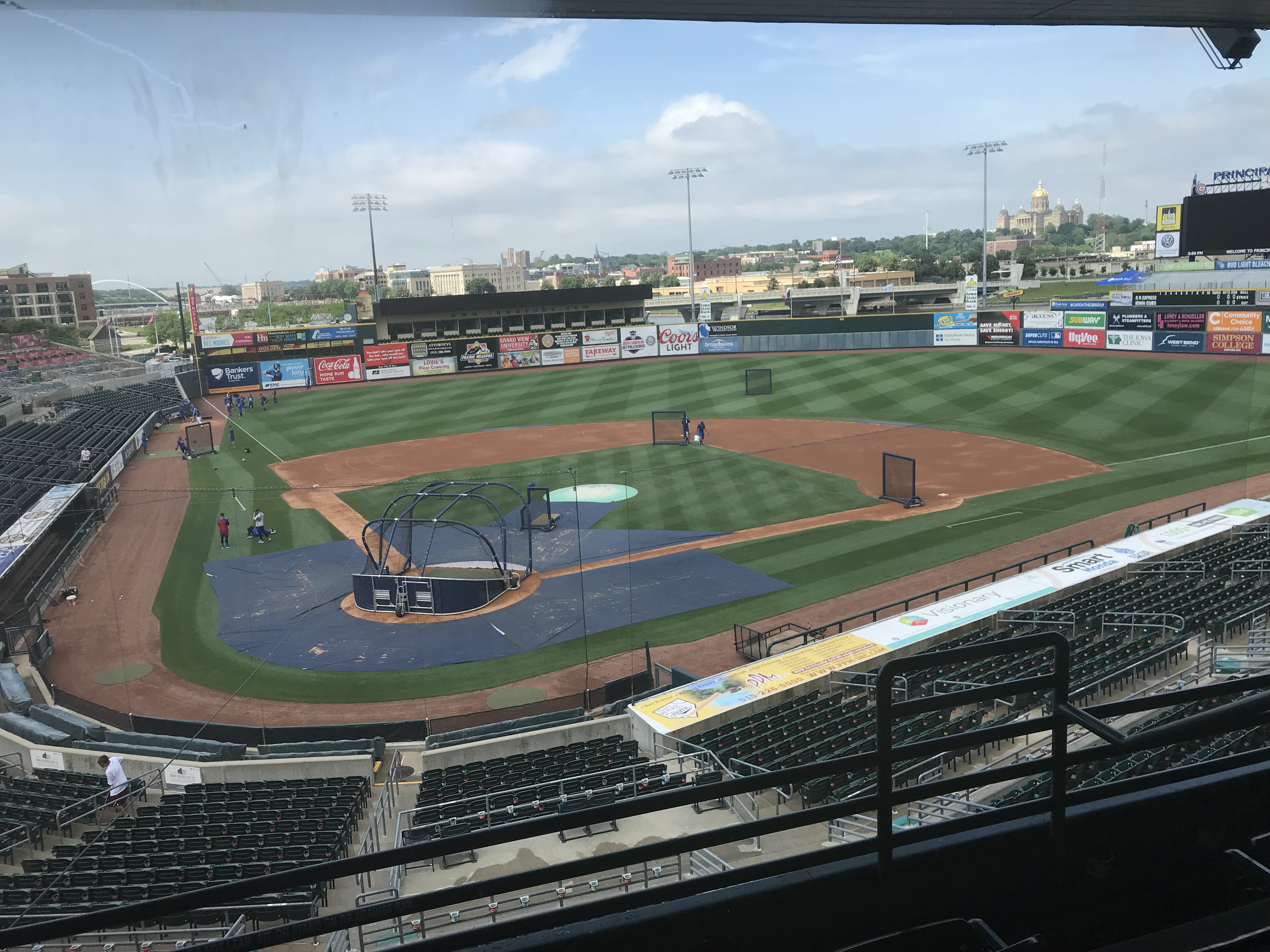
The field before a game in June 2019

In 1995, the ballpark added a new look with a remodeled clubhouse and 12 skyboxes in left field. The $2 million clubhouse expansion featured new locker room facilities for both the Cubs and visiting clubs. The locker room complex also included new offices for managers and coaches, laundry and storage facilities, an expanded training room, an indoor batting cage, a new weight room and a family lounge.

Many new features were added prior to the 2000 season. A skybox was added to the first base side, 88 new Home Plate Club seats were constructed behind home plate and a $100,000 sound system was installed. The Cub Club also was extensively remodeled and the park became a smoke-free facility.

After the completion of the 2002 season, a new playing surface was installed at Principal Park. The three-month-long project cost just under $1 million, and features the same grass as Wrigley Field. It is often cited as one of the best playing fields in the minor leagues.

Over the winter between the 2005 and 2006 seasons, Principal Park underwent another extensive renovation at a cost of $6.8 million. New seats were installed throughout the ballpark, a new scoreboard and video board were installed, and a fountain in right field was completed in time for the 2007 season. A bleacher seating area in front of the scoreboard and a large kids' play area was installed on the first base concourse.

A new video board was added to right field in 2015, while a ribbon board and LED lighting was added in 2017.

Prior to the 2026 season, the bullpens were moved out of foul territory so that players chasing foul balls would not accidentally trip over the mounds, benches, or other obstructions, which resulted in the removal of 734 seats from sections along each foul line. A new video board was also installed (replacing the old one which was damaged after a power surge in November 2025) and the stadium's audiovisual system was upgraded.
