= Southwest Colorado =

Region of Colorado, United States

Coordinates: 38°20′N 107°0′W

Southwestern Colorado is a region in the southwest portion of Colorado, which in turn is part of the larger Four Corners region. It is bordered by Western Colorado, Southern Colorado, the south portion of Central Colorado, Utah, and New Mexico.

== Counties ==
The definition of Southwest Colorado varies by source. The Colorado Office of Economic Development & International Trade includes the following counties in the Southwest Colorado Region:

- Archuleta County
- Dolores County
- La Plata County
- Montezuma County
- San Juan County

Paul M. O'Rourke, writing for the Colorado Bureau of Land Management, equates Southwest Colorado with the Montrose District of the Bureau of Land Management. In addition to the counties listed above, this district includes:

- Delta County
- Gunnison County
- Hinsdale County
- Mineral County
- Montrose County
- Ouray County
- San Miguel County

== Cities ==
- Alamosa, Colorado
- Cortez, Colorado
- Durango, Colorado
- Monte Vista, Colorado
- Montrose, Colorado
- Mancos, Colorado
- Dove Creek, Colorado
- Pagosa Springs, Colorado
- Dolores, Colorado
- Silverton, Colorado
- Ouray, Colorado
- Telluride, Colorado
