= Thomas Cowles =

American politician (1809–1884)

Thomas Cowles (January 12, 1809 – October 22, 1884) was an American politician from Connecticut.

Cowles, fourth son of Zenas and Mary (Lewis) Cowles, was born in Farmington, Connecticut, January 12, 1809.

He spent his life on a farm in his native town, being also engaged in the practice of law and in political affairs. He graduated from Yale College in 1829. He served as Representative in the Connecticut General Assembly in 1849, 1852, 1853, 1869, 1870, and 1872, and from 1849 to 1851 was the Judge of Probate in his district. In 1864 he was a member of the Connecticut State Senate, and from 1863 to 1869 he held the position of Bank Commissioner for Connecticut.

He married, October 9, 1833, Julia Ann, daughter of Gad Cowles, of Farmington. After her death he married October 15, 1845, Elizabeth E., daughter of William Sheffield, who died in Farmington, two days before his own death, which was on October 22, 1884. A son by this second marriage, Edward Sheffield Cowles (1851–1883), graduated Yale in 1873. Two elder sons survived their father.
