= LaMonte Cowles =

American engineer, lawyer and politician (1859–1942)

Member of the Iowa Senate from the 9th district
- In office January 9, 1911 – January 10, 1915
- Preceded by: Frederick Smith
- Succeeded by: Frank Thompson

Personal details
- Born: September 30, 1859 Oskaloosa, Iowa, U.S.
- Died: February 24, 1942 (aged 82) Burlington, Iowa, U.S.
- Party: Republican
- Occupation: engineer, lawyer

LaMonte Cowles (September 30, 1859 – February 24, 1942) was an American engineer, lawyer, and politician.

Cowles was a son of Methodist minister William Fletcher Cowles and Maria Elizabeth LaMonte, born in Oskaloosa on September 30, 1859. His father was a widower who had three prior children. Lamonte Cowles had a full brother, Gardner Cowles Sr. LaMonte graduated from Iowa Wesleyan College in 1879 and worked for the Union Pacific, the Chicago Burlington and the Pacific Railroad as an engineer. Cowles subsequently read law, was admitted to the bar in 1886, and relocated to Burlington, Iowa, to practice law. Cowles legal career included a stint as city attorney.

Cowles was active in Republican Party politics. He served ten years as a Republican congressional committee member for the first district, and four years on the Republican state committee, as well as other party committees at the city, county, and state levels. Between January 9, 1911, and January 10, 1915, Cowles held the District 9 seat in the Iowa Senate as a Republican.

Cowles was married to Hattie E. Kane from 1886 to her death in 1889. The couple had one daughter. In 1897, he married Ida S. Miller. He died on February 24, 1942, at Burlington's Mercy Hospital.
