= John Cowles Jr. =

American editor and publisher

- John Cowles Jr. in 1978
- Born: May 7, 1929; Des Moines, Iowa, US
- Died: March 17, 2012 (aged 82); Minneapolis, Minnesota, US
- Education: Harvard University
- Occupation: Publisher
- Spouse: Sage Cowles
- Children: 4

John Cowles Jr. (May 27, 1929 – March 17, 2012) was an American editor and publisher, son of John Cowles Sr. (1898–1983). Cowles sat on the boards of directors of the Associated Press and Columbia University's Pulitzer Prizes and had been CEO of Cowles Media Company, founded by his grandfather and until 1998 the parent of the Star Tribune.

== Biography ==
In 1960, he helped Minneapolis raise US$2.4 million to build the first Guthrie Theater and later helped the city build the Hubert H. Humphrey Metrodome. Cowles then supported the Guthrie's demolition in 2006 for the expansion of the Minneapolis Sculpture Garden next door to the Walker Art Center.

After serving as vice president and associate editor of the Minneapolis Tribune and the Minneapolis Star-Journal, in August 1960 Cowles Jr. assumed editorship of both papers. He became president in 1968 and editorial chairman the following year. Cowles had a progressive political viewpoint, publishing editorials supporting the civil rights movement and liberal causes.

In 1965, Cowles acquired half-interest in Harper's magazine which during his fifteen-year tenure lost readers and nearly US$2 million.

In 1982 the afternoon Star was discontinued due to low circulation, and the staffs of the Star and Tribune were transferred to the merged Minneapolis Star and Tribune. Cowles Jr., fired publisher Donald R. Dwight. His handling of Dwight's termination led to his removal as editor in 1983, although his family retained a controlling financial interest in the newspaper.

In a 2006 essay written at the University of Minnesota Hubert H. Humphrey Institute of Public Affairs, Cowles wrote, "The nonprofit sector must reform itself, most notably by initiating some minimum federal standards of behavior and by limiting the lifespan of private foundations to 25 or 30 years so that emphasis is on accomplishment, not process and perpetuation." He donated startup funds for MinnPost.com which was founded in 2007.

Cowles died at home of lung cancer on March 17, 2012. He was 82.
