= Horse & Rider =

US magazine

- Frequency: Monthly
- Founded: 1961
- Company: Equine Network
- Country: United States
- Based in: Boulder, Colorado
- Website: horseandrider.com
- ISSN: 0018-5159
- OCLC: 220551973

Horse & Rider is a monthly magazine featuring Western riding, training, horse care, equine tack and equipment, horse shows, and trainers, among other subjects.

== History and profile ==
Horse & Rider was established in 1961. The magazine was published by Active Interest Media and is based in Boulder, Colorado. In 2021, Active Interest Media sold its Equine Network properties to Growth Catalyst Partners. The magazine is designed to help all western enthusiasts of all ages and skill levels to improve riding skills and concepts. The magazine contains step-by-step instructions by leading horse professionals. Special sections highlight important horses and western horseback riders.
