= The Durango Herald =

Newspaper published in Durango, Colorado

- Type: Daily newspaper
- Owner: Ballantine Communications
- Founder(s): Jerome L. Marsh; George Marsh
- Founded: June 23, 1881; 145 years ago
- Language: English
- City: Durango, Colorado
- Country: United States
- Sister newspapers: Tri-City Record
- Website: durangoherald.com

The Durango Herald is a newspaper in Durango, Colorado.

== History ==
=== Pioneer days ===
In 1879, David F. Day, nicknamed "Daisy Dean," and Mr. Letcher founded The Solid Muldoon in Ouray, Colorado. In January 1881, Mrs. Caroline W. Romney (formerly Miss Lina Westcott) founded the Durango Record. The Memphis Daily Appeal described Romney as "a lady who is evidently not afraid to speak her mind when occasion demands."

On June 23, 1881, the first issue of the Durango Herald was published. It was founded by father-son team Jerome L. Marsh and George Marsh. In May 1882, the Marshes acquired the Record and absorbed it into the Herald. In May 1883, J.C. Sullivan bought out J.L. Marsh, while George Marsh remained on as editor.

In June 1884, the Herald's $3,000 mortgage was foreclosed after business suffered for the past six months due to a "snow blockade" and subsequent "washouts." J.L. Marsh then bought the Herald and retained his son as editor.

In January 1887, C. Num Nichols acquired a half-interest in the Herald. In May 1887, J. L. Marsh "fired himself" over disagreements with Nichols. In September 1887, George N. Raymond, owner of The San Juan, bought the Herald. He then sold a half-interest in the The San Juan to Muldoon owner Day. At the Herald, he was joined by his brother, Sol W. Raymond. In February 1888, Laura B. Marsh, daughter and sister to the former owners of the Herald, won a $500 prize for a story written for The Youth's Companion.

In 1890, a fire in Durango injured a woman and two children, killing one of them. S.W. Raymond and several other onlookers approached Isaac "Ike" Yoho, a cowboy from Silverton, and each asked to borrow his horse in order to travel and get a physician to treat them, but Yoho refused. S.W. Raymond then published an editorial criticizing Yoho. About six weeks later on July 4, Yoho ran into S.W. Raymond in Silverton and then punched him in the head. S.W. Raymond called out for help, grabbed a rock, and threated to throw it at Yoho if he did not desist his attack. But Yoho did not yield and was then hit in the head by the hurled stone, which fractured his skull. He died several hours later. The local grand jury refused to indict S.W. Raymond as the killing was committed in self defense.

In January 1892, Day relocated the Muldoon to Durango. The June, Day sold the Muldoon to the Raymond brothers, who consolidated it with the Herald. In July 1893, Day founded another paper called the Durango Democrat. In September 1892, J.L. Marsh died. In November 1893, Day was appointed Indian agent for the Southern Ute Indian Reservation. In 1900, George Marsh died.

=== 20th to early 21st century ===
In 1914, D.F. Day died. In 1916, J. Harry McDevitt purchased the Herald from the Raymond family. In 1922, Democrat editor Rod S. Day, who was the son of D.F. Day, fatally shot Herald editor William L. Wood after brawling in the street. The animosity arose after the Herald published an editorial charging the Democrat of not supporting the 18th Amendment of the U.S. Constitution. Two witnesses said Wood struck first. R.S. Day was charged with murder and a jury later acquitted him.

In 1924, the Day family sold the Democrat to George W. Lane, John B. O'Rourke and Reese McCloskey. In 1928, McDevitt acquired the Democrat and merged the two papers to form the Herald-Democrat. In 1930, R.S. Day and John C. Young founded the weekly Durango News. In 1934, the McDevitt's brother, William F. "Bill" McDevitt, who was associated in the Herald's management, died at age 47.

In 1940, R.S. Day died. In 1942, McDevitt died at age 68. His daughter Mrs. Doris D. Wilson then managed the business while her husband Wilson served as editor. In 1943, News co-publisher John C. Winner died at age 40. In 1945, Alton C. Dorsett and Harold L. "Prexy" Anderson acquired the Herald-Democrat, and a few months later began receiving wire services from the Associated Press. In 1946, Leo R. Brewington and Kenneth C. Gray bought the News from Young and O'Rourke. In 1948, Morris T. Higley purchased the Herald-Democrat. In 1949, the twice-weekly News moved into a new building.

In 1950, Timothy O'Connor and his brother-on-law Victor J. Morgan, who co-owned the Daily Inter Lake, bought the News. In 1952, husband-and-wife Arthur and Morley Cowles Ballantine purchased the Durango Herald-Democrat from O'Connor, and the Durango News from Brewington. The two papers were then consolidate and renamed to the Herald-News. In 1958, the couple acquired the Cortez Sentinel.

In 1960, the Herald-News was renamed to The Durango Herald. The Ballantines co-edited and co-published the paper together. In 1975, Arthur Ballantine at age 61 after running the paper for 23 years. Morley Cowles Ballantine operated the Herald until retiring and was eventually succeeded by her son Richard Ballantine. She died in 2009 at age 84.

=== Decline ===
In March 2013, Ballantine Communications, parent company of the The Durango Herald, The Cortez Journal, The Dolores Star and The Mancos Times, laid off three employees from the Herald and eight from the Journal. Richard Ballantine retired in October 2013, and Douglas Bennett was installed as CEO.

In February 2017, the company announced Herald print editions would be reduced from seven to four days a week. At that time, The Denver Post reported between a quarter and a third of Herald newsroom staff were laid off. In 2020, the Herald laid off five people from its news and advertising departments as a result of the COVID-19 recession in the United States. In 2026, the paper further decreased it print publication days to three editions a week.

== Awards ==
The Herald has won numerous awards, given by entities such as the Society of Professional Journalists, the Colorado Associated Press Reporters and Editors, and the Colorado Press Association.

== Pop culture ==
In 1965, Rosemary DeCamp starred as Durango Record editor Caroline Romney in an episode of Death Valley Days titled "Mrs. Romney and The Outlaws."
