= Des Moines Tribune =

Afternoon newspaper in Des Moines, Iowa, 1906–1982

- Type: Daily newspaper, evening edition
- Format: Broadsheet
- Owner: Cowles family
- Founded: 1906
- Ceased publication: September 25, 1982
- Language: English
- Headquarters: 717 Locust St., Des Moines, Iowa
- Circulation: 147,000 (1947)

The Des Moines Tribune was a daily afternoon newspaper published in Des Moines, Iowa. It was founded in 1906 and purchased in 1908 by the Cowles family, which owned the Des Moines Register. The newspapers shared production and business operations, but maintained separate editorial staffs which often behaved as rivals and competitors.

The Tribune had a peak circulation of 147,000 in 1947. In 1981, the paper's circulation area was cut from 22 counties to 8 and by 1982 its circulation had dwindled to 68,000. The newspaper ceased publication in September 1982 and merged with the Register.
