= John Cowles Sr. =

American newspaper and magazine publisher

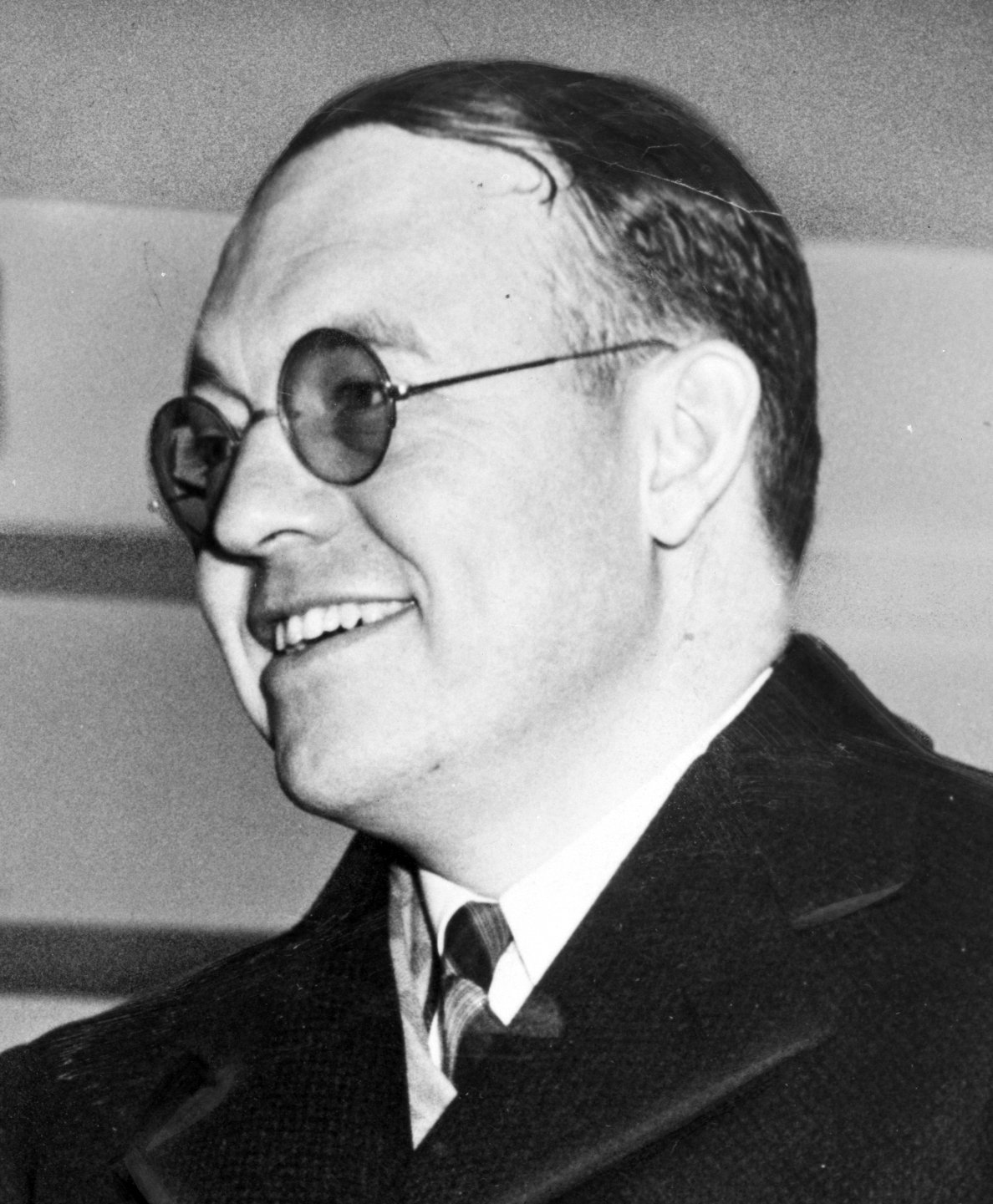
- John Cowles Sr.
- Born: December 14, 1898
- Died: February 25, 1983 (aged 84); Minneapolis, Minnesota
- Education: Phillips Exeter Academy; Harvard University
- Occupation: Publisher
- Children: Morley Cowles Ballantine, Sarah Cowles Doering, John Cowles Jr., Russell Cowles
- Parent(s): Gardner Cowles Sr. and Florence Call

John Cowles Sr. (December 14, 1898 – February 25, 1983) was an American newspaper and magazine publisher. He was co-owner of the Cowles Media Company, whose assets included the Minneapolis Star, the Minneapolis Tribune, the Des Moines Register, Look magazine, and a half-interest in Harper's Magazine.

== Biography ==
The son of banker, publisher, and politician Gardner Cowles Sr., John was a graduate of Phillips Exeter Academy and Harvard University.

In 1922, Cowles launched the Register and Tribune Syndicate.

In 1935, his family acquired the Minneapolis Star; John moved to Minneapolis to manage the paper. Under his leadership, it had the city's highest circulation, pressuring Minneapolis's other newspapers. With his brother Gardner "Mike" Cowles Jr., he was a co-founder of Look magazine, launched in 1937.

In 1939, the Cowles brothers, along with entrepreneur Everett M. "Busy" Arnold, became owners of the newly formed Comic Magazines, Inc., the corporate entity that would publish the Quality Comics comic book line. (Quality was an influential creative force in what historians and fans call the Golden Age of comic books).

That same year, the Cowles family purchased the Minneapolis Evening Journal, merging the Star and the Journal into the Star-Journal. The following year the Cowles family bought the Minneapolis Tribune and merged it with their company, giving it ownership of the city's major newspapers. The Tribune became the city's morning newspaper, the Star-Journal (renamed the Star in 1947) was the evening newspaper, and they published a joint Sunday edition. A separate evening newspaper (the Times) was spun off, which published until 1948.

To help counteract the agitation against the Vietnam War in the mid-1960s, Cowles served on a committee that included such notables as: Arthur H. Dean, Dean Acheson, Eugene R. Black, James B. Conant, Thomas S. Gates, Roswell Gilpatric, David Rockefeller, and John J. McCloy.

His service on boards included the boards of trustees of the Ford Foundation and the Carnegie Endowment for International Peace and the boards of directors of the First National Bank of Minneapolis and the Equitable Life Insurance Company of Iowa.

== Family ==
He had four children: newspaper publisher Morley Cowles Ballantine; Sarah Cowles Doering; John Cowles Jr., who married the stepdaughter of Cass Canfield, the chairman of Harper & Row; and Russell Cowles.
