= The Des Moines Register =

Daily newspaper in Des Moines, Iowa, US

- Front page of the May 3, 2011 edition
- Type: Daily newspaper
- Format: Broadsheet
- Owner: USA Today Co.
- Editor: Rachel E. Stassen-Berger (June 2025'-Present)
- Founded: 1849 (as The Iowa Star)
- Headquarters: 400 Locust Street, Suite 500; Des Moines, Iowa 50309; USA
- Circulation: 12,800 Average print circulation 6,256 Digital Subscribers
- ISSN: 3068-2363 (print); 3068-2991 (web)
- Website: desmoinesregister.com

The Des Moines Register is the daily morning newspaper of Des Moines, Iowa, United States. Formed through the development and merger of several 19th-century newspapers, it began publishing under its current name in 1915. The paper came under the ownership of the publisher and holding company Gannett in 1985. It won its first Pulitzer Prize in 1924, and has since won 16 more, with the most recent coming in 2018 for editorial writing.

== History ==
=== Early period ===
The first newspaper in Des Moines was the Iowa Star. In July 1849, Barlow Granger began the paper in an abandoned log cabin by the junction of the Des Moines and Raccoon rivers.

In 1854, The Star became the Iowa Statesman, which was also a Democratic paper. In 1857, The Statesman became the Iowa State Journal, which published three times per week.

In 1870, The Iowa State Journal became the Iowa State Leader as a Democratic newspaper, which competed with pro-Republican Iowa Daily State Register for the next 32 years.

In 1902, George Roberts bought the Register and Leader and merged them into a morning newspaper. In 1903, Des Moines banker Gardner Cowles, Sr. purchased the Register and Leader. The name finally became The Des Moines Register in 1915. (Cowles also acquired the Des Moines Tribune in 1908. The Tribune, which merged with the rival Des Moines News in 1924 and the Des Moines Capital in 1927, served as the evening paper for the Des Moines area until it ended publication on September 25, 1982).

Under the ownership of the Cowles family, the Register became Iowa's largest and most influential newspaper, eventually adopting the slogan "The Newspaper Iowa Depends Upon". Newspapers were distributed to all four corners of the state by train and later by truck as Iowa's highway system improved.

=== Nationwide development ===
In 1906, the newspaper's first front-page editorial cartoon, illustrated by Jay Norwood Darling, was published; the tradition of front-page editorial cartoons continued until December 4, 2008, when 25-year veteran cartoonist Brian Duffy was let go in a round of staff cuts.

The Register employed reporters in cities and towns throughout Iowa, and it covered national and international news stories from an Iowa perspective, even setting up its own news bureau in Washington, D.C. in 1933. During the 1960s, circulation of the Register peaked at nearly 250,000 for the daily edition and 500,000 for the Sunday edition–more than the population of Des Moines at the time. In 1935, the Register & Tribune Company founded radio station KRNT-AM, named after the newspapers' nickname, "the R 'n T". In 1955, the company, renamed Cowles Communications some years earlier, founded Des Moines' third television station, KRNT-TV, which was renamed KCCI after the radio station was sold in 1974. Cowles eventually acquired other newspapers, radio stations and television stations, but almost all of them were sold to other companies by 1985.

In 1943, the Register became the first newspaper to sponsor a statewide opinion poll when it introduced the Iowa Poll, modeled after Iowan George Gallup's national Gallup poll. Sports coverage was increased under sports editor Garner "Sec" Taylor – for whom Sec Taylor Field at Principal Park is named – in the 1920s. For many years the Register printed its sports sections on peach-colored paper, but that tradition ended for the daily paper in 1981 and for the Sunday Register's "Big Peach" in 1999. Another Register tradition – the sponsorship of RAGBRAI – began in 1973 when writer John Karras challenged columnist Donald Kaul to do a border-to-border bicycle ride across Iowa. The liberal-leaning editorial page has brought Donald Kaul back for Sunday opinion columns. Other local columns have faded and given way to Gannett-distributed material.

=== Under Gannett ownership ===
In 1985, faced with declining circulation and revenues, the Cowles family sold off its various properties to different owners, with the Register going to Gannett. At the time of sale, only The New York Times had won more Pulitzer Prizes for national reporting.

In 1990, the Register began to reduce its coverage of news outside of the Des Moines area by closing most of its Iowa news bureaus and ending carrier distribution to outlying counties, although an "Iowa Edition" of the Register was still being distributed throughout most of the state. Many of the Register's news stories and editorials focus on Des Moines and its suburbs.

The Register opened a new printing and distribution facility on the south side of Des Moines in 2000. The news and advertising offices remained in downtown Des Moines. After 95 years in the Des Moines Register Building at 715 Locust Street, the Register announced in 2012 that they would move to a new location in 2013, settling for Capital Square three blocks to the east. On June 15, 2013, the Register moved to its new location of 400 Locust Street. In 2014, the old building was sold for $1.6 million with plans for it to be redeveloped into a combination of apartments and retail space.

The Indianapolis Star became the sister publication of the paper after it also came under Gannett ownership.

In 2019, the Register switched from two print editions - a State and Metro edition - to one edition statewide.

The Register came under scrutiny in September 2019 after uncovering a pair of controversial tweets made by Carson King, a 24-year-old Iowa man whose beer sign on ESPN College GameDay resulted in over $3 million in contributions to a children's hospital. King was 16 at the time of the posts. According to Carol Hunter, the paper's executive editor, the Register elected to include the information toward the end of a story about King. "Reasonable people can look at the same set of facts and disagree on what merits publication. But rest assured such decisions are not made lightly and are rooted in what we perceive as the public good," she explained after receiving complaints from readers. Some readers later found social media comments previously made by the reporter, Aaron Calvin, which contained racial slurs and condemnation of law enforcement. The Register defended its decision and announced that they would launch an investigation into the "inappropriate social media posts" made by a staff member, though it did not name anyone involved. On September 27, the Register announced that Calvin was no longer employed by the newspaper. Calvin later wrote an op-ed in the Columbia Journalism Review blaming Gannett and the Register for what he considered to be an "unfair" firing.

Starting March 12, 2022, the Register moved to a six day printing schedule, eliminating its printed Saturday edition.

In October 2022, the Register was discovered to have provided commercial printing services to a "pink slime" media client, Local Government Information Services, which the Columbia Journalism Review described as publishing "multiple misleading, decontextualized, and often nonfactual stories on hot-button issues in Illinois".

On December 16, 2024 President-elect Donald Trump filed suit against the Register citing violation of the Iowa Consumer Fraud Act due to their publication of Ann Selzer's Iowa presidential election poll, which resulted in a 16 point error. The newspaper's vigorous fight against the suit won the admiration of other journalists: the Columbia Journalism Review said "the paper has remained resolute" in spite of the capitulation of larger media companies like Paramount during the 60 Minutes deceptive editing lawsuit.

== Editorial philosophy ==
In the three decades before the Cowles family acquired the Register in 1903, the newspaper was a "voice of pragmatic conservatism". However, Gardner Cowles Sr., who served as a Republican in the Iowa General Assembly, was a delegate to the 1916 Republican National Convention, and served in the administration of President Herbert Hoover, was an advocate of progressive Republicanism. The new owners presented a variety of viewpoints, including Darling cartoons that frequently made fun of progressive politicians.

During the Cowles family's ownership, the Register's editorial page philosophy was generally more liberal in its outlook than editorial pages of other Iowa newspapers, but there were notable exceptions. The publishers strongly supported Republican Wendell Willkie's 1940 presidential campaign against Democrat Franklin D. Roosevelt. The newspaper also supported Republican Dwight Eisenhower's campaigns for the Republican nomination and general election in 1952, and again in 1956. Although the Register endorsed presidential candidates Lyndon B. Johnson in 1964, Hubert Humphrey in 1968, and Jimmy Carter in 1976, it endorsed Richard Nixon in 1960 and 1972.

The paper was a severe critic of George W. Bush's warrantless wiretapping strategy and claimed that in doing so, "President Bush has declared war on the American people."

In December 2007, two weeks before the 2008 Iowa caucuses, the Register endorsed Hillary Clinton (in the Democratic caucuses) and John McCain (in the Republican caucuses). In October 2008, it endorsed Barack Obama for president in the general election.

In 2011, 24 days before the 2012 Iowa caucuses, the newspaper endorsed former Massachusetts Governor Mitt Romney in the Republican caucuses. The Register endorsed Romney over Obama ten days before the general election on October 27, 2012, the first time that it supported a Republican for president since 1972.

On July 24, 2015, the newspaper announced that it had been denied press credentials to cover a Donald Trump presidential campaign family picnic in Oskaloosa, Iowa, because of an editorial the previous week that had called on Trump to drop out of the race.

On January 23, 2016, it endorsed Republican Senator Marco Rubio for the GOP nomination and Hillary Clinton for the Democratic candidate.

On October 13, 2018, the Register endorsed all Democratic candidates standing for the House of Representatives in the 2018 elections and stated that Republicans have "failed to govern".

On January 25, 2020, the newspaper endorsed Democratic Senator Elizabeth Warren for her party's presidential nomination.

== Register and Tribune Syndicate ==
In 1922, Gardner Cowles' son John launched the Register and Tribune Syndicate. At its peak, the syndicate offered other newspapers some 60 to 75 features, including editorial cartoonist Herblock and commentaries by David Horowitz, Stanley Karnow, and others. The cartoons and comic strips included Spider-Man. Will Eisner's The Spirit was part of a 16-page Sunday supplement known colloquially as "The Spirit Section". This was a tabloid-sized newsprint comic book sold as part of eventually 20 Sunday newspapers with a combined circulation of as many as five million copies. The most successful comics feature was The Family Circus, eventually distributed to more than 1,000 newspapers. In 1986, the Register and Tribune Syndicate was sold to Hearst and the King Features Syndicate for $4.3 million.

== Columnists and notable journalists ==
Brianne Pfannenstiel was selected chief politics reporter for the 2020 United States presidential election and co-moderated the seventh Democratic debate with Wolf Blitzer and Abby Phillip on January 14, 2020.

Rekha Basu was a Register opinion columnist for over 30 years.

Iowa Columnist Courtney Crowder has been at the paper for over a decade. The senior writer was also a co-director of the RAGBRAI documentary.

Former columnist Rob Borsellino authored the book So I'm Talkin' to This Guy... (ISBN 1-888223-66-9).

Steve Deace started his career as a sports reporter at the Register.

Bloomberg's Senior White House Reporter Jennifer Jacobs was formerly Chief Political Reporter at the Register.

Former staffer and Storytellers coach, Lisa Rossi, who had two stints at the paper went on to have a career in stand-up comedy.

Sports editor and columnist Bryce Miller worked at the paper for a decade before spending the rest of his career at The San Diego Union-Tribune.

John Naughton covered high school sports for 31 years.

Iowa State columnist Randy Peterson worked at the paper for over 50 years. in 2023, he received the Lifetime Achievement Award from the Football Writers Association of America. The Iowa Cubs named their press box at Principal Park after him in August 2024.

== Awards ==
The Register has won 17 Pulitzer Prizes:

- 6 for National Reporting: 1954, 1958, 1968, 1976, 1979, and 1985
- 4 for Editorial Writing: 1938, 1943, 1956, and 2018
- 3 for Editorial Cartooning: 1924, 1943, and 1963
- 1 for Photography: 1952
- 1 for Feature Photography: 1987
- 1 for Breaking News Photography: 2010
- 1 for Public Service: 1991

Register photographer Robert Modersohn was one of four finalists for the 1976 Pulitzer Prize for Feature Photography for a selection of photographs the jury described as unusual.

Register writer Clark Kauffman was one of three finalists for the 2005 Pulitzer Prize for Investigative Reporting for his exposure of glaring injustice in the handling of traffic tickets by public officials in Iowa.

Editorial writer Andie Dominick was a finalist for the 2014 Pulitzer Prize for Editorial Writing for her series of editorials on Iowa's job licensing laws, and later won the 2018 Pulitzer Prize.

=== INA Awards ===
Additionally, the publication won the Newspaper of the Year Award, bestowed by the Iowa Newspaper Association, for seven consecutive years from 2012 to 2019. The paper has also won hundreds of individual INA awards throughout its storied history. In February 2024, Carol Hunter received the Master Editor award for her 20 years in Iowa journalism.

=== Gannett Greatest Awards ===
Yearly, Register staffers have the option of submitting their work to be reviewed for potential corporate awards. The paper has won dozens of Gannett Awards.

== Iowa Sports Hall of Fame, Register Sports Awards, People to Watch and Storytellers Project ==
The Register sponsors the Iowa Sports Hall of Fame.

The paper also held its own Sports Awards ceremony recognizing outstanding high school athletes from 2016 to 2021. The Awards were discontinued in 2022 due to lack of sponsorship but returned in 2024 with Scheels as the primary sponsor. The awards were also renamed the Iowa High School Sports Awards and currently take place at the Iowa Events Center downtown.

Beginning in 2011, the paper started the annual People to Watch series at the end of each year. 15 people are selected across the state and profiled throughout the month of December. Readers also have the option to submit potential nominees as well. Over 200 individuals have been featured thus far.

Also in 2016, the Register started the triannual Storytellers Project. The series was conceived in September 2015 and is modeled after a similar event held by The Arizona Republic. Anyone can be a potential speaker for the event as long as they have a compelling story. Over 250 individuals have spoken for the series held at Hoyt Sherman Place. The recurring event was put on hiatus from mid-2020 to mid-2022 due to the COVID-19 pandemic. Similar events are also held by the Austin American-Statesman and The Tennessean.
