= Cowles =

Cowles may refer to:

== Surname ==
- Alfred Cowles Sr. (1832–1889), publisher Chicago, spouse Sarah Hutchinson
- Alfred Cowles Jr. (1865–1929) publisher, businessman and lawyer
- Alfred Cowles (III) (1891–1984) businessman and economist
- Anna Roosevelt Cowles (Bamie) (1855–1931), sister of Theodore Roosevelt, aunt of Eleanor Roosevelt
- Betsy Mix Cowles (1810–1876), feminist and educator, Ohio
- Edwin Cowles (1825–1890), publisher Cleveland, spouse Elizabeth Hutchinson
- Eunice Caldwell Cowles (1811–1903), American educator
- Fleur Cowles (1908–2009), artist
- Gardner Cowles Sr. (1861–1946), banker, publisher and politician
- Gardner Cowles Jr. (Mike) (1903–1985), publisher
- George A. Cowles, an American ranching pioneer
- Henry Chandler Cowles (1869–1939), botanist and ecological pioneer
- Ione Virginia Hill Cowles (1858–1940), American clubwoman, social leader
- John Cowles Sr. (1898–1983), publisher
- John Cowles Jr. (1929–2012), publisher and philanthropist
- Julia Darrow Cowles – American children's book writer and storyteller
- Louisa F. Cowles (1842–1924), educator
- Osborne Cowles, college basketball coach at the University of Minnesota and University of Michigan
- Paul Cowles, a member of the Committee of Fifty (1906)
- Raymond B. Cowles (1896–1975), American herpetologist
- Robert Cowles, politician and member of the Wisconsin State Senate
- Shirley Cowles (1940–2020), New Zealand cricketer
- Trenton Cowles (born 2002), American archer
- Virginia Cowles (1910–1983), American journalist
- William H. H. Cowles (1840–1901), U.S. politician
- William S. Cowles (1846–1923), admiral

== Place names ==
- Cowles, Nebraska, a village located in Webster County, Nebraska
- Cowles Mountain, a hill within the city limits of San Diego, California

== Other ==
- Cowles Center for Dance and the Performing Arts
- Cowles Conservatory in the Minneapolis Sculpture Garden
- Cowles Foundation (Cowles Commission for Research in Economics)
- Cowles House (disambiguation), various places
- Cowles Electric Smelting and Aluminum Company, Lockport, New York USA and Cowles Syndicate Company, Staffordshire, England
- Cowles Syndicate, see King Features Syndicate
- Cowles Media Company, Minneapolis, Minnesota, and Des Moines, Iowa, USA
- Cowles Company, Spokane, Washington, USA
- Cowles Stadium, Christchurch, New Zealand
