= Cowles Company =

American media company

- Type: Private
- Industry: Publishing, manufacturing, media, real estate
- Founded: 1894; 132 years ago
- Founder: William H. Cowles
- Headquarters: Spokane, Washington, U.S.
- Area served: Spokane, Washington, Spokane Valley, Washington, Coeur d'Alene, Idaho, Inland Empire
- Key people: Elizabeth A. Cowles (Chair); W. Stacey Cowles (Publisher)
- Website: cowlescompany.com
- Footnotes; Real Cities, McClatchy Interactive

The Cowles Company is an American diversified media company based in Spokane, Washington. The company owns and operates The Spokesman-Review in Spokane, founded in 1894, and owned the Spokane Daily Chronicle until it was shut down in 1992. Built by William H. Cowles, the publishing business eventually constructed striking buildings in downtown Spokane for both papers. The Chronicle Building was eventually converted into offices and then residential. The company also owned several other papers and operates Inland Empire Paper Company, television stations, and interests in real estate, insurance, marketing and financial services.

William Stacey Cowles, the publisher of The Spokesman-Review, is the great-grandson of the company's founder, William H. Cowles, and the fourth generation of the Cowles family to run the paper. His sister, Elizabeth A. Cowles, is chairwoman of the parent company.

== History ==
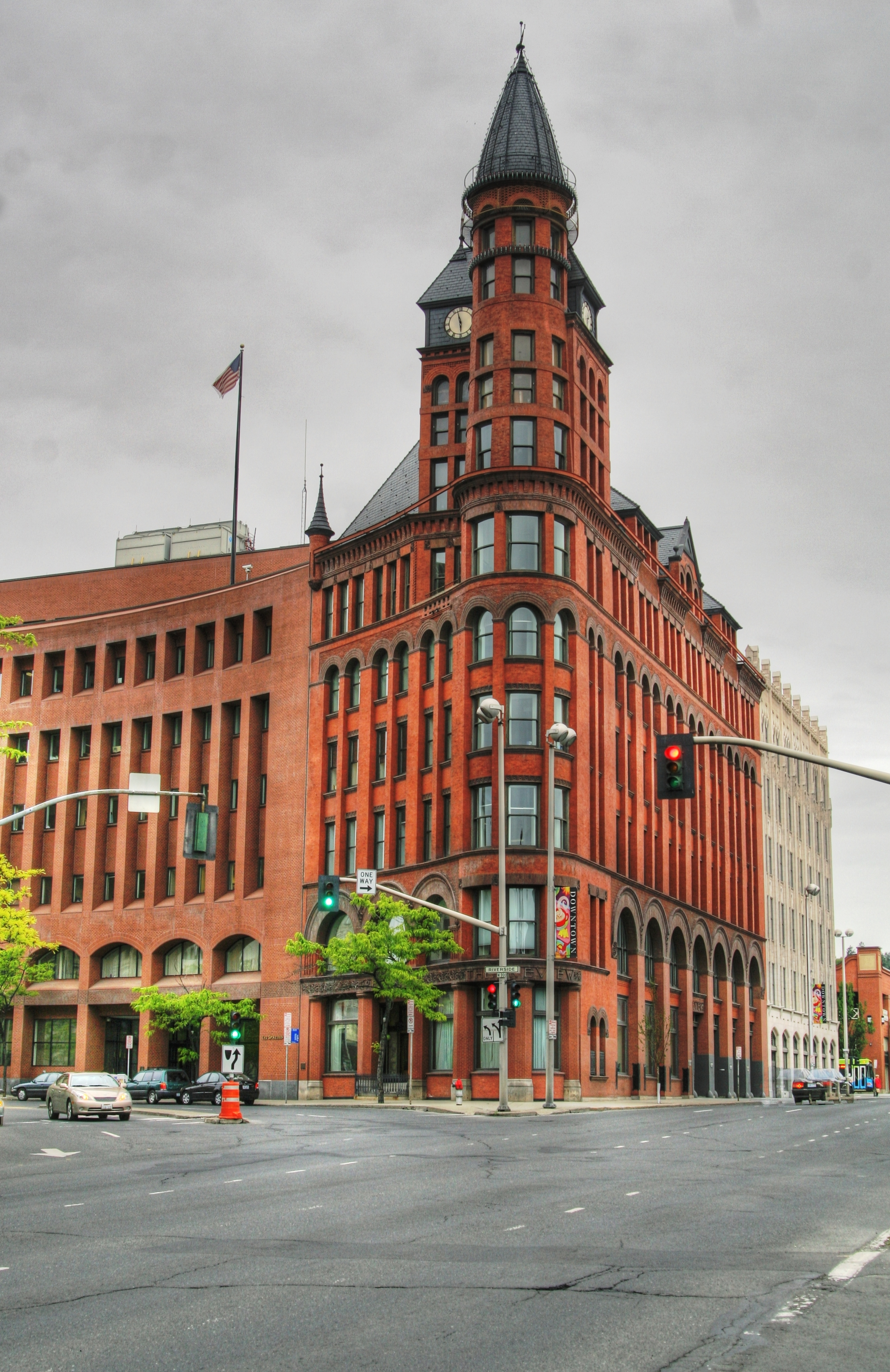
Spokesman-Review tower in Spokane

William H. Cowles came to Spokane at age 24 to be the business manager of the Spokesman, which was founded less than two years before, and excelled at local news coverage. He had experience as a police reporter for the Chicago Tribune and was the son of the Tribune's treasurer, Alfred Cowles Sr. He soon bought the Spokesman from his partners. In 1893, he bought a rival paper, the Review, and merged the two papers into The Spokesman-Review. He acquired the Spokane Chronicle in 1897.

According to Time in 1952, he was a "determined man" who had an artificial leg yet walked two miles to the office each day.

Cowles set the Chronicle on a course to be independent, and The Spokesman-Review to support Republican Party causes. Time magazine related the paper's success gaining lowered rates for freight carried to the Northwest United States and an improved park system and that helped the region. Increasing its reputation for comprehensive local news and by opposing "gambling, liquor and prostitution", The Spokesman-Review gained popularity. The paper's opposition to building the Grand Coulee Dam was not quite so universally applauded and when it opposed the New Deal and the Fair Deal, it so disturbed President of the United States Harry Truman that he declared the Spokesman-Review to be one of the "two worst" newspapers in the United States. The Scripps League's Press closed in 1939, making Cowles the only newspaper publisher in Spokane. Cowles created four weeklies, the Idaho Farmer, Washington Farmer, Oregon Farmer and Utah Farmer. Cowles died in 1946. When William H. Cowles Jr. succeeded his father as publisher, James Bracken received much more news and editorial control as managing editor. William H. Cowles III succeed his father as publisher.

The original Review Building, designed by Seaton & Ferris in 1891 in a style closest to Richardson Romanesque, is seven stories with a tower that reaches 146 feet (45 m). In 1975, it was listed in the National Register of Historic Places.

== Television ==
Cowles' television operations are centered around the two NBC affiliates in eastern Washington. The flagship is KHQ-TV in Spokane, which was founded by Cowles as Washington's second television station. Cowles also owns KNDO in Yakima and its Tri-Cities semi-satellite KNDU (licensed to Richland). As of September 2007, Cowles planned to acquire two CBS affiliate television stations for US$41 million from Newport Television, one of the holding companies formed by Providence Equity Partners when Providence planned to acquire the television stations owned by Clear Channel Communications. They are KCOY-TV in Santa Barbara-Santa Maria-San Luis Obispo, California and KION-TV in Monterey, California. KION carries The CW on a separate digital channel. Cowles would also have a management agreement with KCBA, the Fox affiliate serving Salinas, Monterey and Santa Cruz, California, and would acquire two low power stations, KKFX-CA, also Fox in San Luis Obispo, California and the Telemundo affiliate KMUV-LP in Monterey. The deal closed on May 7, 2008.

On September 20, 2013, News-Press & Gazette Company announced that it would purchase Monterey stations, KION-TV and KMUV-LP, as well as San Luis Obispo station KKFX-CA. NPG will also take over some of the operations of Santa Maria sister station KCOY-TV, which Cowles will retain, under a shared services agreement (as NPG's holdings in the area already include KEYT-TV in Santa Barbara). The existing LMA for KCBA was terminated on December 1, 2013, as that station's operations were assumed by Entravision Communications through a joint sales agreement (the license was retained by Seal Rock Broadcasters). On September 30, 2013, Cowles announced that it would acquire Max Media's Montana television station cluster for $18 million. The sale was finalized on November 29.

In October 2022, Cowles introduced the standardized branding NonStop Local for all of its stations' news programming, as part of an effort to promote them as multi-platform news sources.

=== Current ===
(**) - indicates a station built and signed on by Cowles.

==== Cowles Montana Media Company ====
City of license / Market	Station	Channel TV (RF)	Owned since	Affiliation
Billings, MT	KULR-TV	8 (11)	2013	NBC
Butte, MT	KWYB	18 (19)	2013	ABC; Fox (DT2)
Bozeman, MT	KWYB-LD (Note: Satellite of KYWB.)	18 (19)	2013	ABC; Fox (DT2)
Great Falls, MT	KFBB-TV	5 (8)	2013	ABC; Fox (DT2)
Helena, MT	KHBB-LD (Note: Satellite of KFBB-TV.)	21 (21)	2013	ABC; Fox (DT2)
Missoula, MT	KTMF	23 (23)	2013	ABC; Fox (DT2)
Kalispell, MT	KTMF-LD (Note: Satellite of KTMF.)	42 (42)	2013	ABC; Fox (DT2)

==== KHQ, Incorporated ====
City of license / Market	Station	Channel TV (RF)	Owned since	Affiliation
Spokane, WA	KHQ-TV**	6 (15)	1952	NBC; SWX (DT2)
Yakima, WA	KNDO	23 (16)	1999	NBC; SWX (DT2)
Richland, WA	KNDU (Note: Satellite of KNDO.)	25 (26)	1999	NBC; SWX (DT2)
Walla Walla, WA	KSWX	9 (9)	2025	SWX

=== Former ===
Market	Station	Channel	Years owned	Current status
Monterey - Salinas, CA	KMUV-LP	11	2008-2013	Telemundo affiliate KMUV-LD, owned by News-Press & Gazette Company
Monterey - Salinas, CA	KCBA	35	2008-2013 (Note: Cowles operated KCBA through a shared services agreement (SSA).)	The CW affiliate owned by VistaWest Media, LLC (Note: Operated under SSA by News-Press & Gazette Company.)
Monterey - Salinas, CA	KION-TV	46	2008-2013	CBS affiliate owned by News-Press & Gazette Company
Santa Barbara - Santa Maria - San Luis Obispo, CA	KCOY-TV	12	2008-2015 (Note: From 2014 to 2015, News-Press & Gazette Company operated KCOY under an SSA.)	Telemundo affiliate owned by VistaWest Media, LLC
Santa Barbara - Santa Maria - San Luis Obispo, CA	KKFX-CA	24	2008-2013	Fox affiliate KKFX-CD, owned by News-Press & Gazette Company

== Other affiliations ==
- Basic Financial Solutions
- Citizens Realty
- Inland Empire Paper Company
- Spokane Journal of Business
- River Park Square
- Nickels Worth Publications
- Northwest Farmer-Stockman
- Print Marketing Concepts
- The Spokesman-Review
  - Spokane Daily Chronicle
- SWX Right Now

== Cowles family ==
The Cowles family of Spokane is descended from Elizabeth (1827–1910) and Sarah Hutchinson (1837–1884) of Cayuga County, New York. The two sisters married two brothers, Alfred Cowles Sr. and Edwin Cowles of Cleveland, Ohio. Edwin published the Cleveland Leader and Alfred moved to Chicago, Illinois where he purchased one third of the Chicago Tribune.

Feminist and educator Betsy Mix Cowles was Alfred and Edwin's paternal aunt. Edwin's sons Alfred and Eugene were chemists and metallurgists who invented and operated electric arc smelters to extract aluminum. Alfred Cowles, 3rd—the grandson of Alfred Sr.—founded the Cowles Commission for Research in Economics following the Great Depression.

Distantly related, the Cowles family of Spokane are about sixth cousins of the family of Gardner Cowles Sr. of Des Moines, Iowa and Minneapolis, Minnesota who owned Cowles Media Company. Both Cowles publishing families are descendants of Hannah Bushoup (c.1613-1683) of Hartford, Connecticut and John Cowles (1598–1675) of Gloucestershire, England.

Alfred Cowles and Sarah Frances Hutchinson had four children: Edwin (1861–1861), Alfred Jr. (1865–1939), Sarah Frances (1862–1920), and William Hutchinson (1866–1947). William married Harriet Bowen Cheney, and became a newspaper publisher in Spokane, Washington. William is also the grandfather of William H. Cowles III.

=== Gallery ===
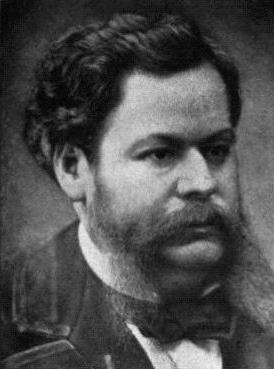
Alfred Cowles Sr. of the Chicago Tribune, father of William H. Cowles

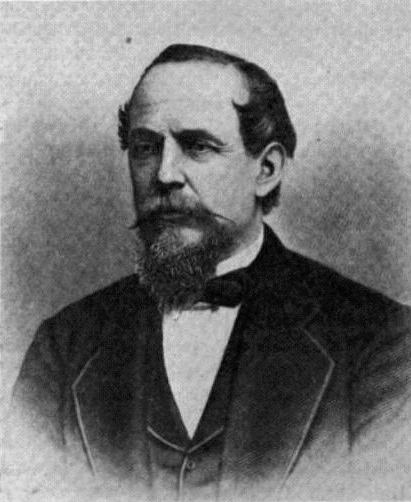
Edwin Cowles of the Cleveland Leader, brother of Alfred Cowles. Sr.
