= Grand River Academy =

Location
- 3042 College Street; Austinburg, Ashtabula County, Ohio 44010; United States
- 41°46′22″N 80°51′43″W

Information
- Former name: Ashtabula County Institute of Science and Industry; Grand River Institute
- Type: Independent, boarding and day, college-preparatory secondary school
- Religious affiliation: Nonsectarian
- Established: 1831; 195 years ago
- Status: Operational
- CEEB code: 360273
- NCES School ID: 01064085
- Head of school: Gina Borst
- Grades: 8–12, PG
- Gender: All-male
- Campus size: 200 acres (81 ha)
- Campus type: Rural
- Colors: Blue and White
- Slogan: "Don't Give Up, Don't Ever Give Up"
- Athletics conference: Lake Effect Conference
- Sports: Baseball, basketball, soccer
- Team name: Eagles
- Accreditations: ISACS; Ohio Department of Education and Workforce
- Annual tuition: $49,500, seven-day boarding; $45,800, five-day boarding; $10,000, day student; $57,650, international boarding
- Affiliations: NAIS; TABS
- Website: grandriver.org

Grand River Academy is an independent, nonsectarian, college-preparatory boarding and day school for boys in Austinburg, Ohio. It serves students in grades 8 through 12, with a postgraduate option. Founded in 1831, the school was formerly known as the Ashtabula County Institute of Science and Industry and later the Grand River Institute. The name "Grand River Academy" is a registered United States trademark.

== Accreditation and affiliations ==
Grand River Academy is listed by the Ohio Department of Education and Workforce as an ISACS-accredited chartered nonpublic school in Ohio.

Grand River Academy maintains an annual giving program, the Blue & White Fund, which the school states supports academics, arts, athletics, student life, programs, and staff beyond tuition and endowment revenue.

== Admissions ==
Grand River Academy uses rolling enrollment and states that students may join when the timing is appropriate for the student and family. The school's application process includes an online application, submission of required documents through a parent portal or by mail, and scheduling a campus visit. The application fee is $50.

The school lists tuition for the 2025–26 school year as $49,500 plus fees for seven-day boarding, $45,800 plus fees for five-day boarding, $57,650 plus fees for international boarding, and $10,000 plus fees for day students. Grand River Academy states that scholarship opportunities are available, including the Ohio EdChoice Scholarship Program for eligible students.

== History ==
Grand River Academy was founded in 1831 as the Ashtabula County Institute of Science and Industry by leaders of the Austinburg Congregational Church. The school was originally established to prepare young men for ministerial vocations, and began admitting female students in 1840.

The institution later became known as Grand River Institute. Its name and location changed in 1836 after Joab Austin pledged a sizable endowment to the school. Local historical accounts state that the school building was moved from the banks of the Grand River to Austinburg in the mid-1830s, reportedly by a team of oxen.

Betsy Mix Cowles was appointed the school's first female principal in charge of the Women's Department, a position she held from 1843 to 1848.

== School leadership ==
Randy Blum served as headmaster for 23 years and retired at the end of June 2012 after nearly four decades on the Grand River Academy campus.

Tim Oditt later served as Head of School before leaving Grand River Academy in 2020 to become Head of School at Ascension Academy in Amarillo, Texas.

Tony Tucker served as headmaster by 2020, when he was profiled by News 5 Cleveland as an African-American head of school at the academy.

The school's current Head of School is Gina Borst.

== Mission and approach ==
The school characterizes its educational approach as combining college-preparatory academics, residential structure, mentorship, and social-emotional support for young men in grades 8 through 12 and postgraduate study.

== Location and transportation ==
Grand River Academy is located on a rural campus in Austinburg, Ohio, near Interstate 90. As a boarding school, its published calendars include student arrival, return, departure, break, and travel-planning dates.

Nearby aviation facilities include Northeast Ohio Regional Airport, a jet-capable general aviation airport in Jefferson, Ohio, and commercial passenger airports in Cleveland and Erie, Pennsylvania.

== Boarding program ==
Grand River Academy operates as a residential boarding school in which students live, study, and participate in student-life activities on campus. The school states that its boarding program includes five dormitories, four dorm parents per dormitory, and a 4:1 student-to-dorm-parent ratio. It also states that all faculty live on campus and are available to students outside classroom hours.

The campus includes Armington Dining Hall, five dormitories, academic buildings, a library, the Bud Field Student Center, and athletic and recreation facilities. The school describes its academic program as including small classes, structured study halls, tutoring, college counseling, and individualized academic support.

As a boarding school, Grand River Academy's published calendars include student arrival, return, departure, break, and travel-planning dates.

The school also states that it schedules transportation for off-campus appointments through its health services program.

== Campus ==
The campus includes three academic buildings, a library, the Robert S. Morrison Lecture Hall, the Bob and Linnett Fritz Technology Center, the Bud Field Student Center, Armington Dining Hall, and a health center.

Athletic facilities include a full-size gymnasium with a wood basketball court, a weight and conditioning room, fitness facilities, and outdoor athletic fields for soccer, baseball, tennis, and pickleball.

== Curriculum ==
Grand River Academy describes its academic program as college preparatory, with small classes, daily academic coaching, structured study halls, tutoring, college counseling, and individualized academic support.

The school's Foundations of Learning Program provides additional academic support for students developing organization or study skills, or needing personalized instruction in subjects such as mathematics, science, social studies, and language arts. The program uses small-group instruction, with class sizes described by the school as ranging from one to three students per teacher, and emphasizes homework completion, note-taking, outlining, research-paper writing, test preparation, and organizational skills.

Grand River Academy also maintains an evening Student Tutoring Program and structured study hall for students requiring additional support. The school states that its academic support program combines Foundations of Learning classes and student tutoring, supervised by student-support staff and a licensed intervention specialist.

The school provides college counseling and social-emotional support through its Counseling Center, which it describes as staffed by licensed clinical counselors who work with students, families, and faculty.

== Student life ==
Student-life facilities include the Bud Field Student Center, Armington Dining Hall, and a health center. The Bud Field Student Center includes Andy's Café, a music room and recording studio, a television lounge, 3D printers, arcade-style games, and a game room with billiards, shuffleboard, and ping pong. The center bears the name of longtime teacher Edmund E. "Bud" Field IV, who taught at Grand River Academy from 1967 to 2001.

=== Athletics ===
Grand River Academy describes athletics as part of its social-emotional learning program. The school lists baseball, basketball, and soccer as varsity sports, and also offers recreational activities including weight training, skiing, tennis, open-gym basketball, and ping pong.

Athletic facilities include a full-size gymnasium with a wood basketball court, outdoor athletic fields for soccer and baseball, and a weight and conditioning room.

Grand River Academy's basketball team won the 2024 Lake Effect Conference title.

=== Clubs and activities ===
The school offers student clubs and organizations in areas including 3D modeling, animal rescue, art history, basketball, Bible study, ceramics, chess, creative writing, Dungeons & Dragons, hiking, international film, journalism, lacrosse, photography, pickleball, soccer, student government, and yearbook.

Grand River Academy also describes off-campus and weekend activities including trips to Lake Erie, Geneva-on-the-Lake, Cleveland professional sports events, museums, the Rock and Roll Hall of Fame, NASA Glenn, the Cleveland zoo, skiing, ice skating, and fishing near Austinburg.

== Notable alumni ==
=== Politics, government, and law ===
- Clarence E. Allen, U.S. Representative from Utah
- John Brown, Jr., eldest son of abolitionist John Brown, member of the Kansas Territory legislature.
- Julius C. Burrows, U.S. Representative and a U.S. Senator from Michigan
- Theodore Elijah Burton, U.S. Representative and U.S. Senator
- Edwin Cowles, publisher of The Cleveland Leader, Vice-President of the 1884 Republican National Convention, postmaster of Cleveland
- H. W. Curtiss, acting Lieutenant Governor of Ohio and former member of the Ohio General Assembly
- Albert Gallatin Egbert, Democratic U.S. Representative from Pennsylvania.
- Alphonso Hart, U.S. Representative from Ohio
- Ralph Hill, U.S. Representative from Indiana and lawyer.
- John Philo Hoyt, American politician and jurist
- Elbert L. Lampson, Lieutenant Governor of Ohio and former state Senator
- Judson B. Phelps, member of the Pennsylvania House of Representatives from Crawford County
- Alonzo A. Potter, member of the Pennsylvania House of Representatives from Crawford County

=== Business ===
- Alfred Cowles, American economist, businessman and founder of the Cowles Commission
- Benjamin Goodrich, American industrialist, founded BFGoodrich
- William Grey Rose, businessman, real estate developer, and co-founder of the Cleveland Provision Company

=== Education ===
- George Pliny Brown, educator and president of Indiana State Normal School

=== Sports ===
- Charlie Morton, Major League Baseball player, manager, and executive
- Robert Bobroczkyi, Romanian basketball player and actor

=== Literature ===
- Harriet Newell Kneeland Goff, temperance reformer and author

== Notable staff ==
- Betsy Mix Cowles, American abolitionist, suffragist, teacher, and principal of the Female Department
- Edmund E. "Bud" Field IV, longtime Grand River Academy teacher from 1967 to 2001 and namesake of the Bud Field Student Center
- Granville W. Mooney, former teacher and principal of Grand River Institute, Speaker of the Ohio House of Representatives, and co-founder of Bowling Green State University
