= William Cowles =

William Cowles may refer to:

- William H. H. Cowles (1840–1901), U.S. politician
- William S. Cowles (1846–1923), U.S. admiral
- William H. Cowles, (1866–1947) publisher
- William H. Cowles III, (1932 - 1992) publisher

== See also ==
- Billy Cowell, footballer
