= Robert Bobroczkyi =

Romanian basketball player and actor (born 2000)

Personal information
- Born: 17 July 2000 (age 26) Arad, Romania
- Listed height: 7 ft 7 in (2.31 m)
- Listed weight: 224 lb (102 kg)

Career information
- High school: SPIRE Institute (Geneva, Ohio); Grand River Academy (Ashtabula, Ohio)
- College: Rochester Christian (2021–2022)
- Playing career: 2014–2022
- Position: Center

Career history
- 2014–2015: Stella Azzurra

Robert Bobroczkyi (Hungarian: Bobróczky Róbert; born 17 July 2000) is a Romanian–Hungarian actor and former basketball player. Standing 2.31 m (7 ft 7 in), he has drawn attention for his exceptional height. After moving to the United States in 2016 and attending high school in Geneva, Ohio, he attended Rochester Christian University in Rochester Hills, Michigan.

He has appeared in the 2024 film Alien: Romulus and the 2026 film Backrooms.

== Early life and education ==
Bobroczkyi was born in Arad, Romania, the son of 2.17 m (7 ft 1 in) tall Hungarian-born Romanian international basketball player Zsigmond Zoltán Bobróczky (who competed alongside Gheorghe Mureșan) and Brunhilde, a 1.86 m (6 ft 1 in) former volleyball and handball player. At age eight he was taller than his mother, at 1.88 m (6 ft 2 in) tall. By the age of 12, he reached a height of 2.18 m (7 ft 2 in), surpassing his father. As such, he was taller than Robert Wadlow was from the ages 8 to 14 years. He has been the subject of medical studies nearly his entire life, leading to the prevailing opinion that his height is a result of healthy genetics (i.e. familial or constitutional tall stature), not a hormonal disease or overgrowth syndrome. Bobroczkyi weighed just 190 lb (86 kg) at the time of his high school basketball debut in January 2017, and with a height of 2.31 m (7 ft 7 in), he was considered underweight, with a body mass index (BMI) of 16.1. As a high school senior, Bobroczkyi wore US size 17 shoes and had a 140 cm (57 in) inseam.

Bobroczkyi speaks Romanian, Hungarian, English, Serbo-Croatian, and Italian. As of November 2024, he had graduated from Rochester Christian University with a degree in business administration but was continuing to pursue a degree at RCU in information systems and cybersecurity.

== Basketball career ==
=== Youth ===
In 2014, Bobroczkyi was recruited by A.S. Stella Azzurra, an amateur-level basketball club based in Italy that produced NBA power forward Andrea Bargnani. A scouting report on him noted that Bobroczkyi possessed an improved midrange jumper and passing ability, and his physical attributes made him an obvious mismatch against any of his opponents. Like most players of his stature however, Bobroczkyi was limited by his lack of muscle mass, endurance, and mobility on the court. His tremendously awkward gait and threat of exhaustion forced Bobroczkyi to play limited minutes after helping the team win its under-15 championship title. Despite his limitations, Bobroczkyi became an internet sensation in early 2016, as videos surfaced of him dominating much shorter competition during a game with Stella Azzurra.

=== High school ===
In 2016, Bobroczkyi moved to Geneva, Ohio, in the United States to play basketball at the college-preparatory school SPIRE Institute and Academy while attending the nearby Grand River Academy for academics. Entering his freshman season, Bobroczkyi was put on a minutes restriction as he attempted to bulk up his physique for a transition into faster, more physical American basketball. On 14 January 2017, Bobroczkyi made his debut for SPIRE Institute. He had back surgery in his senior year, preventing him from playing basketball for two years. In July 2020, Bobroczkyi committed to Rochester Christian University.

=== College ===
Bobroczkyi returned to Romania shortly after classes began in the fall of 2020 due to the COVID-19 pandemic but returned to Rochester Christian University in the fall of 2021. He stopped playing basketball after the 2021–22 season.

== Acting career ==
In 2024, Bobroczkyi made his acting debut as an "Offspring" alien in the sci-fi horror film Alien: Romulus, directed by Fede Álvarez. In the 2026 science fiction horror film Backrooms by Kane Parsons, he portrayed the character Pirate Clark.

=== Filmography ===
Year	Title	Role	Refs.
2024	Alien: Romulus	Offspring	
2026	Backrooms	Pirate Clark	

== See also ==
- List of tallest people
