= Inland Northwest =

Region of the United States

Coordinates: 47°00′N 118°00′W

- Region
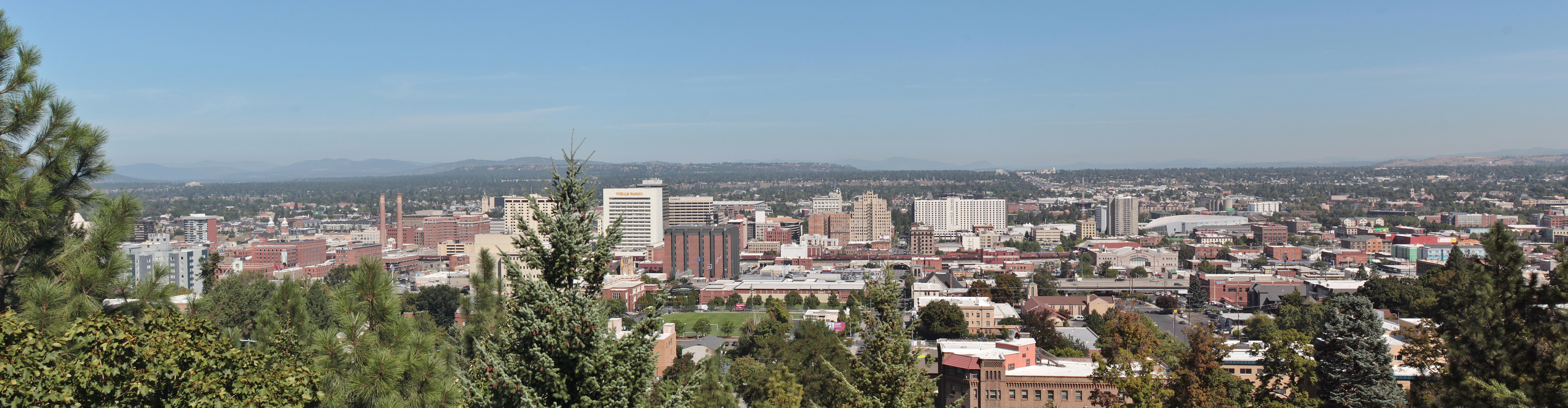
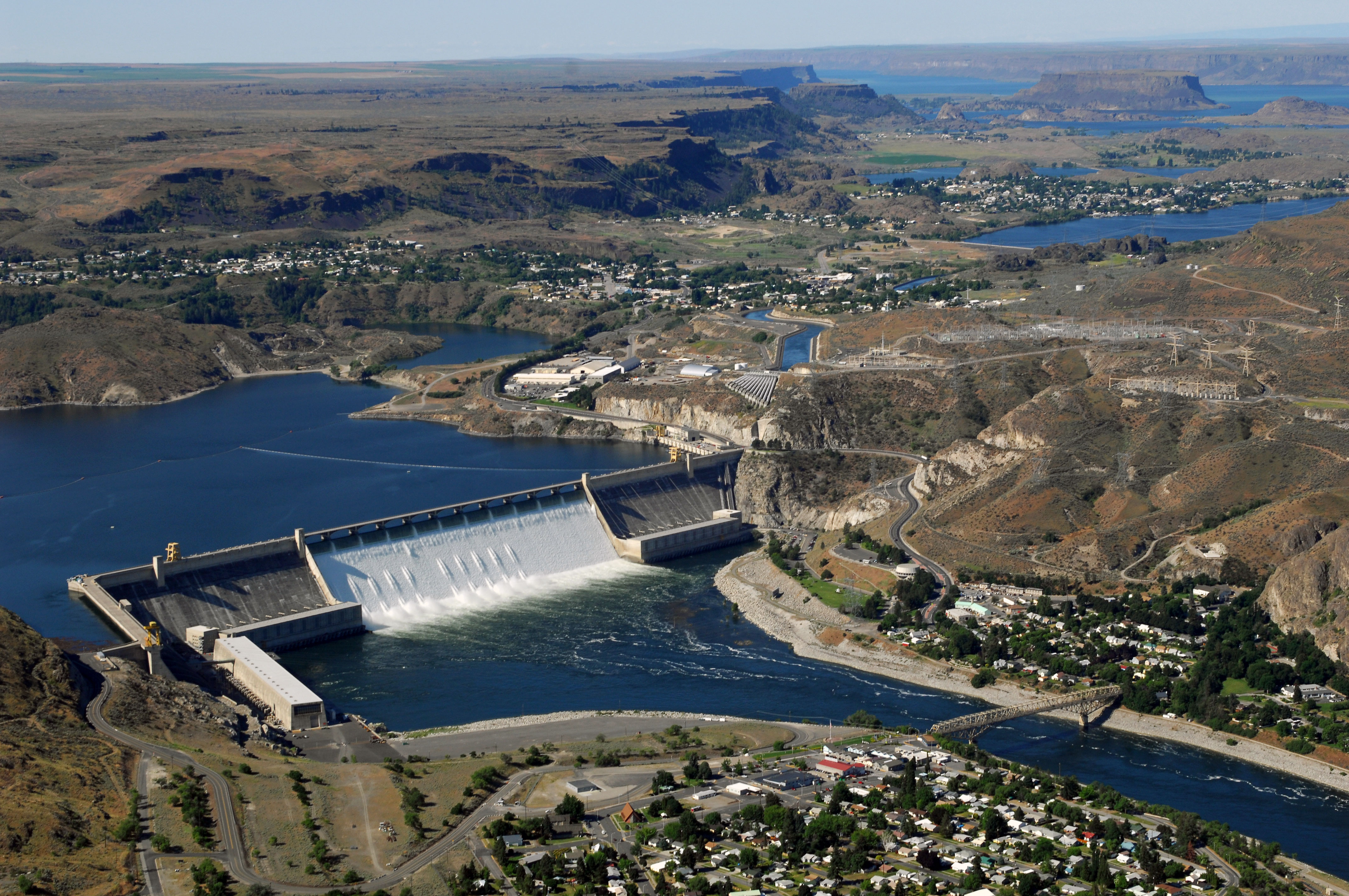
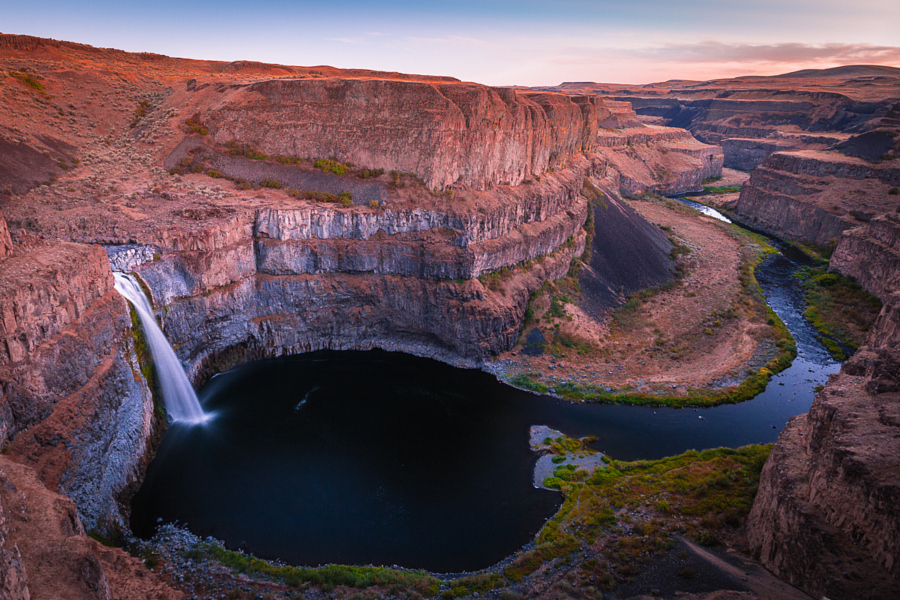
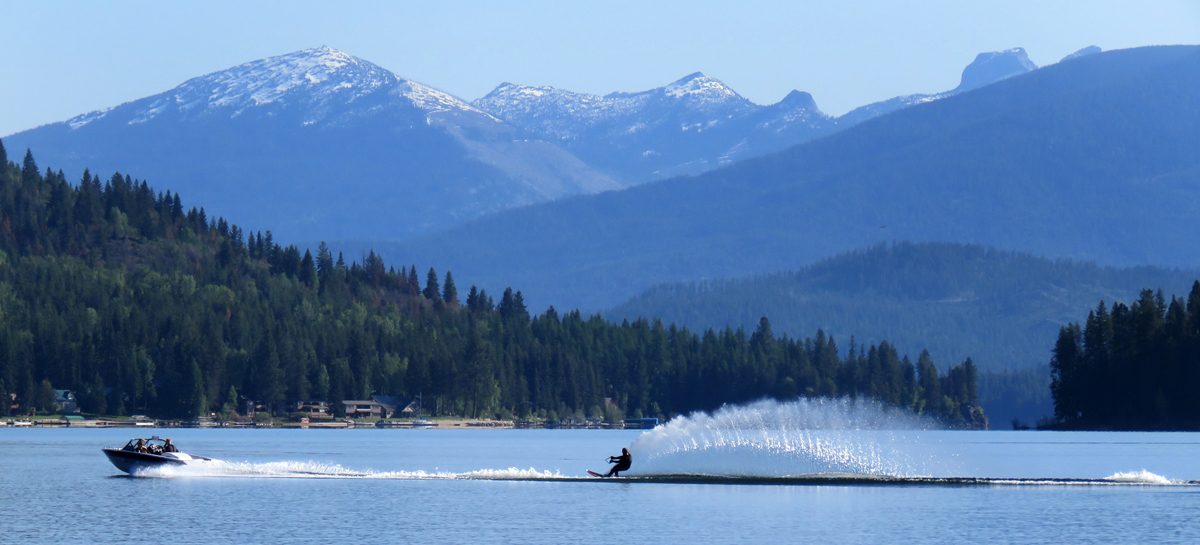
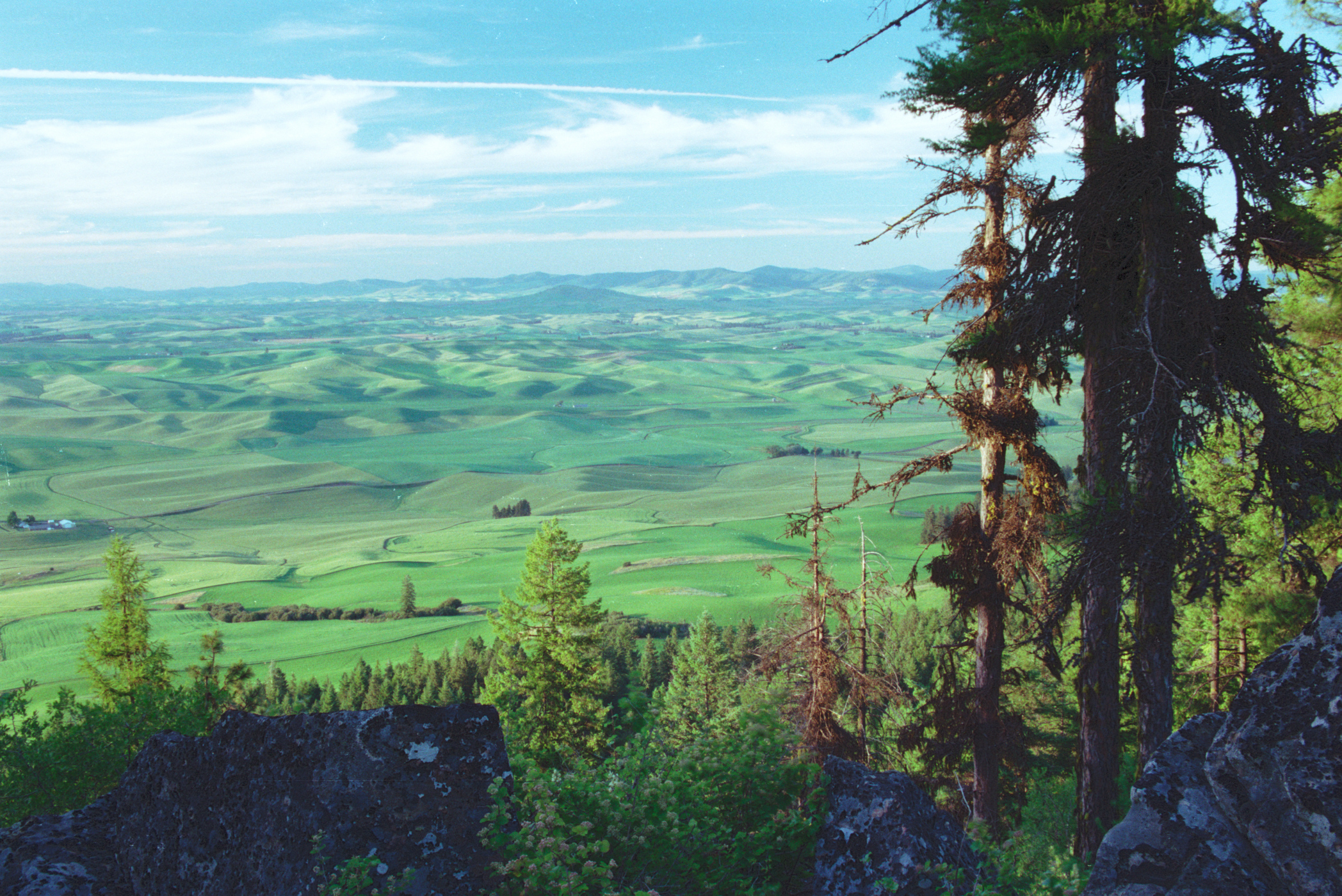
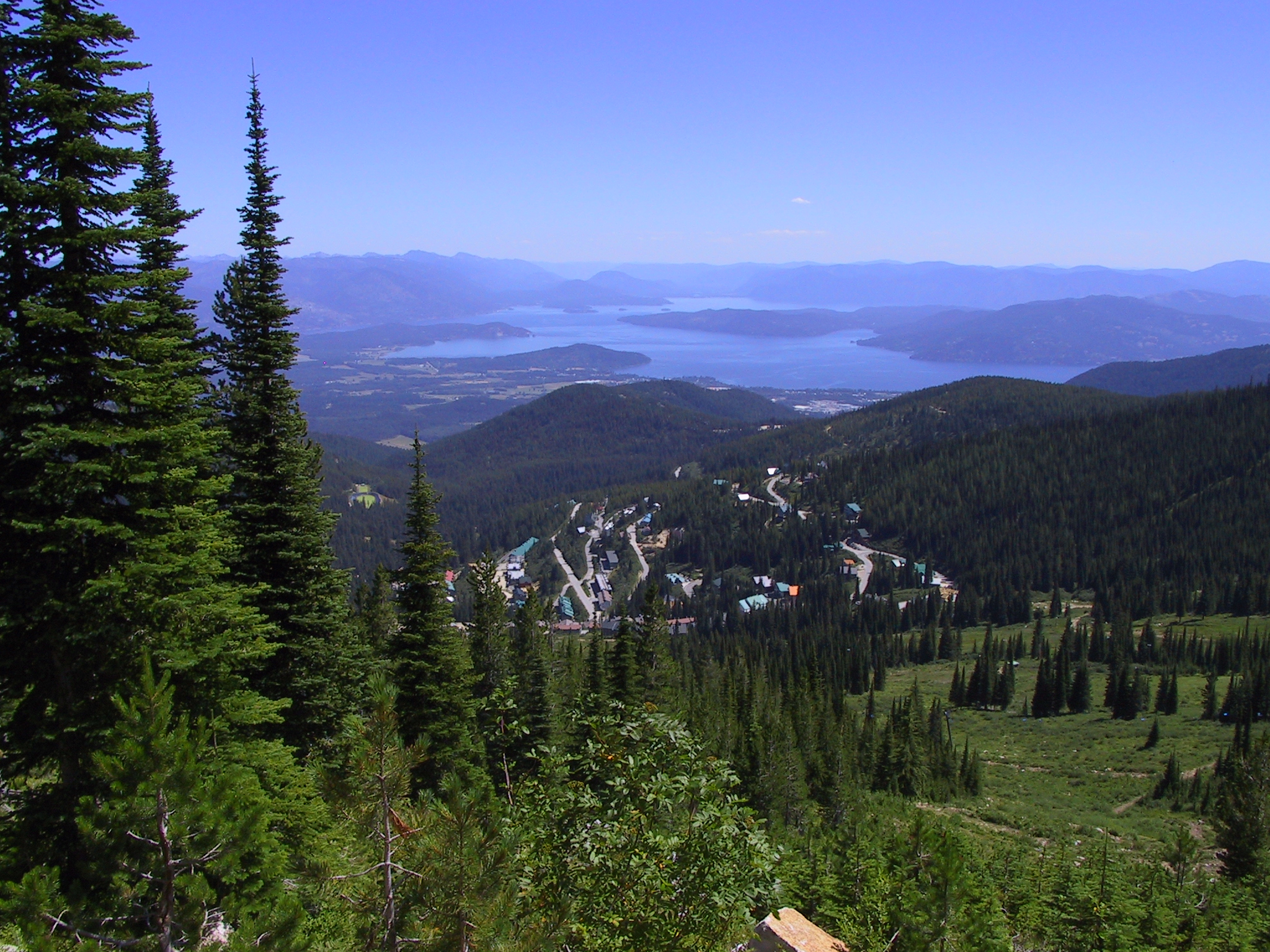
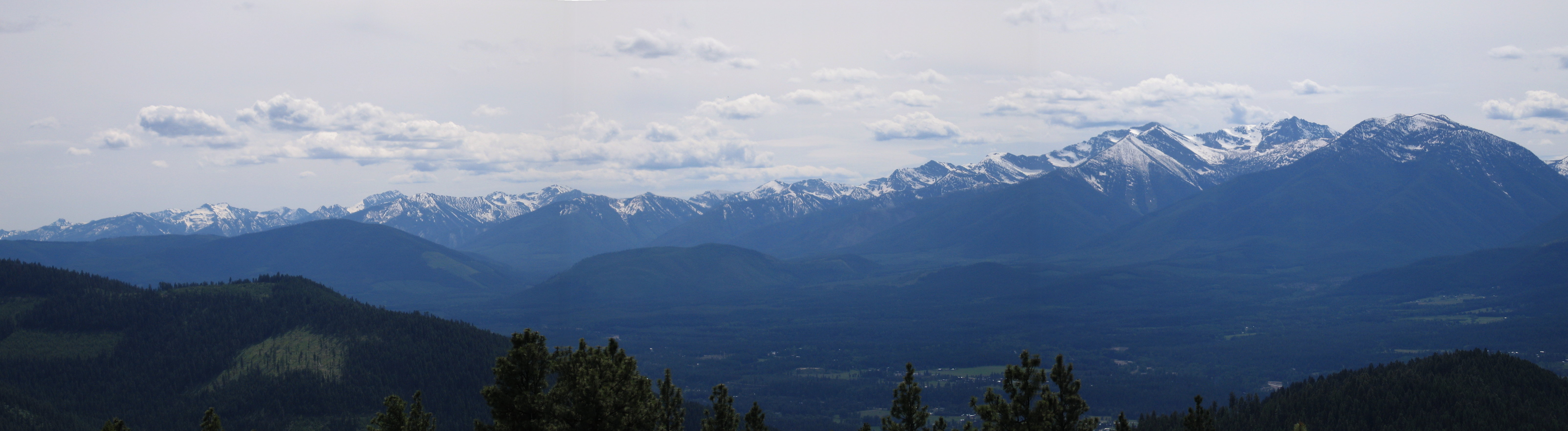
- Left-right from top: Spokane skyline, Grand Coulee Dam and the Columbia River, Palouse Falls, Priest Lake, Palouse farmland, Lake Pend Oreille from Schweitzer Mountain, Cabinet Mountains

- Map of the Inland Northwest. Counties highlighted in red are always included, while counties highlighted in pink are sometimes included.
- Composition: Eastern Washington and North Idaho; sometimes: parts of Eastern Oregon and Western Montana
- Largest metropolitan areas: Spokane-Coeur d'Alene; Tri-Cities; Yakima
- Dialect: Pacific Northwest English

The Inland Northwest, historically and alternatively known as the Inland Empire, is a region of the Northwestern United States centered on the Greater Spokane, Washington, Area, encompassing all of Eastern Washington and Northern Idaho. Under broader definitions, Northeastern Oregon and Western Montana may be included in the Inland Northwest. Alternatively, stricter definitions may exclude Central Washington and Idaho County, Idaho.

The phrase Inland Empire was first used by the Spokane Falls Review newspaper of Spokane Falls, Washington Territory (today's Spokane, Washington) in its first issue on May 19, 1883.

As of 2016, the U.S. Census Bureau estimated the combined population of eastern Washington and northern Idaho alone to be 2,240,645, comparable to that of New Mexico. Its Canadian counterpart, north of the border, is the British Columbia Interior, which together comprise the inland portion of the broader Pacific Northwest. Significant urban centers include the Spokane–Coeur d'Alene area and the Tri-Cities.

There have been several proposals to politically unite the Inland Northwest. In the mid and late 1860s, there was a proposal centered on Lewiston in northern Idaho for a Columbia Territory to be formed in the region from parts of what is now eastern Washington, northern Idaho and western Montana. In 1901, another proposal was made, this time to combine the Idaho Panhandle with Eastern Washington to create the State of Lincoln. A third proposal was popularized in the late 1920s to consist of eastern Washington, northern Idaho and western Montana to the Continental Divide.

== Counties ==
Washington
Adams, Asotin, Benton, Chelan, Columbia, Douglas, Ferry, Franklin, Garfield, Grant, Kittitas, Klickitat, Lincoln, Okanogan, Pend Oreille, Spokane, Stevens, Walla Walla, Whitman, and Yakima
Idaho
Benewah, Bonner, Boundary, Clearwater, Idaho, Kootenai, Latah, Lewis, Nez Perce, and Shoshone

Oregon (sometimes included)

Morrow, Umatilla, Union, and Wallowa

Montana (sometimes included)

Flathead, Lake, Lincoln, Mineral, Missoula, Ravalli, and Sanders

== Geography ==
The region is bounded by the Cascade Mountains on the west and the Rocky Mountains (following the spine of the remote and rugged Cabinet Mountains) on the east, the Blue Mountains of Oregon and foothills of the Wallowa Mountains to the south, southeast, and encompasses the Columbia river basin (or Columbia Plateau). Between the three mountain ranges are large, sweeping areas of semi-arid steppe, part of which has been irrigated due to the Columbia Basin Project, resulting in expansive farmland in central Washington. The Palouse, original home of the Appaloosa, is another major agricultural region located in the gently rolling hills of southeastern Washington and extending into Idaho. In northern Idaho, the precipitation from the Pacific Ocean over the North Central Rockies forests, create the North American inland temperate rainforest. The Coeur d'Alene Mountains of this range is noted for its natural resource wealth, particularly the Silver Valley with its mining heritage dating back to the 1880s.

Spokane, the region's largest city, is located near where the arid, and largely unforested Columbia plateau meets the lush forests of the Selkirk Mountains. The urban area stretches east into Idaho along the I-90 corridor through the Spokane River valley. Across the border in Idaho the suburbs stretch into the cities of Post Falls and Coeur d'Alene on the north shore of Lake Coeur d'Alene. The Northeastern Washington and North Idaho portion of the Inland Empire are mountainous and forested, and the crest of the Bitterroot Range of the Rocky Mountains forms part of the eastern boundary of the Inland Empire region, while the Columbia River forms a significant part of its southern boundary.

=== Climate ===
The Washington side is generally semi-arid, while the Idaho side experiences a mostly dry summer continental climate.

Climate data for Spokane (Spokane Int'l), 1991–2020 normals, (Note: Mean maxima and minima (i.e., the highest and lowest temperature readings during an entire month or year) calculated based on data at said location from 1991 to 2020.) extremes 1881–present (Note: Official records for Spokane kept at Spokane Weather Bureau Office from February 1881 to July 1889, and at Spokane International Airport since August 1889.)
Month	Jan	Feb	Mar	Apr	May	Jun	Jul	Aug	Sep	Oct	Nov	Dec	Year
Record high °F (°C)	62 (17)	63 (17)	74 (23)	90 (32)	97 (36)	109 (43)	108 (42)	108 (42)	98 (37)	87 (31)	70 (21)	60 (16)	109 (43)
Mean maximum °F (°C)	48.2 (9.0)	51.1 (10.6)	63.0 (17.2)	73.9 (23.3)	84.0 (28.9)	90.5 (32.5)	97.5 (36.4)	97.0 (36.1)	89.2 (31.8)	74.6 (23.7)	56.4 (13.6)	48.0 (8.9)	99.1 (37.3)
Mean daily maximum °F (°C)	34.5 (1.4)	39.5 (4.2)	48.6 (9.2)	56.9 (13.8)	67.1 (19.5)	73.7 (23.2)	84.4 (29.1)	83.8 (28.8)	73.6 (23.1)	57.7 (14.3)	42.3 (5.7)	33.8 (1.0)	58.0 (14.4)
Daily mean °F (°C)	29.6 (−1.3)	32.9 (0.5)	40.0 (4.4)	47.0 (8.3)	56.0 (13.3)	62.3 (16.8)	71.0 (21.7)	70.3 (21.3)	61.1 (16.2)	47.9 (8.8)	36.3 (2.4)	29.1 (−1.6)	48.6 (9.2)
Mean daily minimum °F (°C)	24.7 (−4.1)	26.3 (−3.2)	31.5 (−0.3)	37.0 (2.8)	44.9 (7.2)	50.8 (10.4)	57.6 (14.2)	56.7 (13.7)	48.6 (9.2)	38.0 (3.3)	30.3 (−0.9)	24.3 (−4.3)	39.2 (4.0)
Mean minimum °F (°C)	4.4 (−15.3)	9.8 (−12.3)	18.5 (−7.5)	26.4 (−3.1)	32.7 (0.4)	40.2 (4.6)	45.9 (7.7)	45.6 (7.6)	35.4 (1.9)	23.2 (−4.9)	14.1 (−9.9)	7.1 (−13.8)	−3.0 (−19.4)
Record low °F (°C)	−30 (−34)	−24 (−31)	−10 (−23)	14 (−10)	24 (−4)	33 (1)	37 (3)	35 (2)	22 (−6)	7 (−14)	−21 (−29)	−25 (−32)	−30 (−34)
Average precipitation inches (mm)	1.97 (50)	1.44 (37)	1.83 (46)	1.25 (32)	1.55 (39)	1.17 (30)	0.42 (11)	0.47 (12)	0.58 (15)	1.37 (35)	2.06 (52)	2.34 (59)	16.45 (418)
Average snowfall inches (cm)	12.3 (31)	7.8 (20)	3.9 (9.9)	0.7 (1.8)	0.1 (0.25)	0.0 (0.0)	0.0 (0.0)	0.0 (0.0)	0.1 (0.25)	0.5 (1.3)	6.2 (16)	13.8 (35)	45.4 (115)
Average precipitation days (≥ 0.01 in)	14.2	10.9	11.8	10.3	9.7	7.8	4.0	3.2	4.7	8.9	13.4	13.8	112.7
Average snowy days (≥ 0.1 in)	9.5	5.7	4.0	1.0	0.3	0.0	0.0	0.0	0.1	0.3	4.3	9.5	34.7
Average relative humidity (%)	82.5	79.1	70.3	61.0	58.2	53.9	44.0	45.0	53.9	66.6	82.7	85.5	65.2
Mean monthly sunshine hours	78.3	118.0	199.3	242.3	296.7	322.8	382.4	340.4	271.2	191.0	73.8	59.1	2,575.3
Percentage possible sunshine	28	41	54	59	63	68	79	77	72	57	26	22	54
Source: NOAA (relative humidity and sun 1961–1990)

Climate data for Kennewick, Washington, 1991–2020 normals, extremes 1894–present
Month	Jan	Feb	Mar	Apr	May	Jun	Jul	Aug	Sep	Oct	Nov	Dec	Year
Record high °F (°C)	74 (23)	74 (23)	87 (31)	95 (35)	104 (40)	114 (46)	115 (46)	115 (46)	100 (38)	89 (32)	79 (26)	72 (22)	115 (46)
Mean maximum °F (°C)	59.5 (15.3)	61.8 (16.6)	70.8 (21.6)	81.5 (27.5)	91.4 (33.0)	97.9 (36.6)	103.4 (39.7)	102.1 (38.9)	92.9 (33.8)	80.1 (26.7)	68.1 (20.1)	59.8 (15.4)	104.4 (40.2)
Mean daily maximum °F (°C)	41.7 (5.4)	48.1 (8.9)	58.1 (14.5)	66.3 (19.1)	75.3 (24.1)	82.0 (27.8)	91.3 (32.9)	90.3 (32.4)	80.5 (26.9)	65.9 (18.8)	50.9 (10.5)	41.5 (5.3)	66.0 (18.9)
Daily mean °F (°C)	35.5 (1.9)	39.5 (4.2)	47.0 (8.3)	54.3 (12.4)	62.7 (17.1)	69.2 (20.7)	76.8 (24.9)	75.8 (24.3)	66.8 (19.3)	54.5 (12.5)	42.9 (6.1)	35.6 (2.0)	55.1 (12.8)
Mean daily minimum °F (°C)	29.6 (−1.3)	31.0 (−0.6)	36.2 (2.3)	42.5 (5.8)	50.4 (10.2)	56.7 (13.7)	62.7 (17.1)	61.6 (16.4)	53.5 (11.9)	43.4 (6.3)	35.2 (1.8)	30.0 (−1.1)	44.4 (6.9)
Mean minimum °F (°C)	15.3 (−9.3)	18.8 (−7.3)	26.1 (−3.3)	33.5 (0.8)	40.1 (4.5)	48.4 (9.1)	54.5 (12.5)	53.3 (11.8)	43.8 (6.6)	30.7 (−0.7)	22.5 (−5.3)	16.8 (−8.4)	10.0 (−12.2)
Record low °F (°C)	−27 (−33)	−23 (−31)	8 (−13)	18 (−8)	26 (−3)	35 (2)	38 (3)	37 (3)	21 (−6)	14 (−10)	−8 (−22)	−29 (−34)	−29 (−34)
Average precipitation inches (mm)	1.13 (29)	0.79 (20)	0.66 (17)	0.61 (15)	0.81 (21)	0.59 (15)	0.20 (5.1)	0.17 (4.3)	0.26 (6.6)	0.66 (17)	0.86 (22)	1.13 (29)	7.87 (201)
Average snowfall inches (cm)	1.3 (3.3)	0.1 (0.25)	0.0 (0.0)	0.0 (0.0)	0.0 (0.0)	0.0 (0.0)	0.0 (0.0)	0.0 (0.0)	0.0 (0.0)	0.0 (0.0)	0.4 (1.0)	0.4 (1.0)	2.2 (5.55)
Average precipitation days (≥ 0.01 in)	11.1	8.1	7.8	6.9	6.3	4.7	2.1	1.9	2.6	6.3	8.9	10.5	77.2
Average snowy days (≥ 0.1 in)	0.8	0.1	0.0	0.0	0.0	0.0	0.0	0.0	0.0	0.0	0.3	0.6	1.8
Source 1: NOAA
Source 2: National Weather Service

Climate data for Yakima Airport, Washington (1991–2020 normals, (Note: Mean monthly maxima and minima (i.e. the expected highest and lowest temperature readings at any point during the year or given month) calculated based on data at said location from 1991 to 2020.) extremes 1946–present)
Month	Jan	Feb	Mar	Apr	May	Jun	Jul	Aug	Sep	Oct	Nov	Dec	Year
Record high °F (°C)	68 (20)	69 (21)	80 (27)	92 (33)	102 (39)	115 (46)	109 (43)	110 (43)	100 (38)	91 (33)	73 (23)	72 (22)	115 (46)
Mean maximum °F (°C)	54.6 (12.6)	59.2 (15.1)	68.9 (20.5)	79.6 (26.4)	89.9 (32.2)	95.0 (35.0)	100.2 (37.9)	99.1 (37.3)	91.2 (32.9)	78.0 (25.6)	64.0 (17.8)	52.3 (11.3)	101.8 (38.8)
Mean daily maximum °F (°C)	39.5 (4.2)	47.2 (8.4)	56.6 (13.7)	64.7 (18.2)	74.1 (23.4)	80.7 (27.1)	89.9 (32.2)	88.5 (31.4)	79.4 (26.3)	64.4 (18.0)	48.9 (9.4)	38.2 (3.4)	64.3 (17.9)
Mean daily minimum °F (°C)	24.0 (−4.4)	26.1 (−3.3)	30.2 (−1.0)	35.2 (1.8)	43.5 (6.4)	49.5 (9.7)	55.0 (12.8)	53.3 (11.8)	44.9 (7.2)	35.3 (1.8)	27.2 (−2.7)	23.1 (−4.9)	37.3 (2.9)
Mean minimum °F (°C)	7.5 (−13.6)	11.0 (−11.7)	20.2 (−6.6)	23.5 (−4.7)	29.3 (−1.5)	36.3 (2.4)	41.9 (5.5)	41.3 (5.2)	32.5 (0.3)	20.9 (−6.2)	12.9 (−10.6)	5.1 (−14.9)	−1.6 (−18.7)
Record low °F (°C)	−21 (−29)	−25 (−32)	−1 (−18)	18 (−8)	25 (−4)	30 (−1)	34 (1)	35 (2)	24 (−4)	4 (−16)	−13 (−25)	−17 (−27)	−25 (−32)
Average precipitation inches (mm)	1.19 (30)	0.81 (21)	0.64 (16)	0.55 (14)	0.74 (19)	0.50 (13)	0.20 (5.1)	0.21 (5.3)	0.23 (5.8)	0.64 (16)	0.86 (22)	1.44 (37)	8.01 (203)
Average snowfall inches (cm)	6.2 (16)	2.7 (6.9)	0.6 (1.5)	0 (0)	0 (0)	0 (0)	0 (0)	0 (0)	0 (0)	0.1 (0.25)	3.0 (7.6)	7.7 (20)	20.3 (52)
Average precipitation days	9.4	7.5	6.4	5.8	6.2	5.2	2.4	2.3	3.2	4.7	8.6	10.1	71.8
Average snowy days	4.3	2.2	0.7	0.1	0	0	0	0	0	0.1	1.8	6.2	15.4
Mean monthly sunshine hours	64	113	186	210	279	300	341	310	240	186	60	62	2,351
Mean daily sunshine hours	2	4	6	7	9	10	11	10	8	6	2	2	6
Percentage possible sunshine	22	38	50	51	60	63	71	71	64	55	21	23	49
Average ultraviolet index	1	2	3	5	6	7	8	7	5	3	1	1	4
Source 1: NOAA
Source 2: Weather Atlas (sun and uv)

Climate data for Wenatchee, (1971-2000 normals)
Month	Jan	Feb	Mar	Apr	May	Jun	Jul	Aug	Sep	Oct	Nov	Dec	Year
Record high °F (°C)	65 (18)	66 (19)	78 (26)	93 (34)	104 (40)	114 (46)	110 (43)	106 (41)	101 (38)	90 (32)	76 (24)	67 (19)	114 (46)
Mean daily maximum °F (°C)	35.1 (1.7)	42.8 (6.0)	54.9 (12.7)	64.6 (18.1)	73.1 (22.8)	80.1 (26.7)	88.0 (31.1)	88.0 (31.1)	77.7 (25.4)	63.7 (17.6)	46.0 (7.8)	35.7 (2.1)	62.5 (16.9)
Daily mean °F (°C)	29.2 (−1.6)	35.1 (1.7)	44.4 (6.9)	52.7 (11.5)	60.9 (16.1)	67.8 (19.9)	74.4 (23.6)	73.7 (23.2)	64.5 (18.1)	52.3 (11.3)	39.1 (3.9)	30.5 (−0.8)	52.1 (11.2)
Mean daily minimum °F (°C)	23.2 (−4.9)	27.4 (−2.6)	33.9 (1.1)	40.8 (4.9)	48.6 (9.2)	55.5 (13.1)	61.0 (16.1)	60.2 (15.7)	51.2 (10.7)	40.8 (4.9)	32.2 (0.1)	25.2 (−3.8)	41.7 (5.4)
Record low °F (°C)	−17 (−27)	−18 (−28)	5 (−15)	20 (−7)	27 (−3)	39 (4)	40 (4)	41 (5)	21 (−6)	19 (−7)	0 (−18)	−19 (−28)	−19 (−28)
Average precipitation inches (mm)	1.35 (34)	0.94 (24)	0.64 (16)	0.51 (13)	0.51 (13)	0.69 (18)	0.30 (7.6)	0.41 (10)	0.40 (10)	0.49 (12)	1.36 (35)	1.52 (39)	9.12 (231.6)
Source: NOAA (normals, 1971−2000)

Climate data for Missoula, Montana (Missoula Airport)
Month	Jan	Feb	Mar	Apr	May	Jun	Jul	Aug	Sep	Oct	Nov	Dec	Year
Record high °F (°C)	60 (16)	66 (19)	78 (26)	90 (32)	95 (35)	102 (39)	107 (42)	105 (41)	99 (37)	85 (29)	73 (23)	60 (16)	107 (42)
Mean daily maximum °F (°C)	33.2 (0.7)	38.8 (3.8)	49.8 (9.9)	58.5 (14.7)	67.3 (19.6)	75.2 (24.0)	85.9 (29.9)	84.9 (29.4)	73.1 (22.8)	57.8 (14.3)	41.5 (5.3)	31.0 (−0.6)	58.2 (14.6)
Mean daily minimum °F (°C)	18.3 (−7.6)	21.2 (−6.0)	27.7 (−2.4)	32.8 (0.4)	39.8 (4.3)	46.6 (8.1)	51.4 (10.8)	50.1 (10.1)	41.8 (5.4)	32.4 (0.2)	24.9 (−3.9)	16.7 (−8.5)	33.7 (0.9)
Record low °F (°C)	−33 (−36)	−28 (−33)	−13 (−25)	2 (−17)	21 (−6)	26 (−3)	31 (−1)	29 (−2)	15 (−9)	−4 (−20)	−23 (−31)	−30 (−34)	−33 (−36)
Average precipitation inches (mm)	0.85 (22)	0.70 (18)	1.00 (25)	1.22 (31)	2.01 (51)	2.07 (53)	0.99 (25)	1.19 (30)	1.17 (30)	0.88 (22)	1.01 (26)	1.04 (26)	14.13 (359)
Average snowfall inches (cm)	8.3 (21)	6.1 (15)	5.1 (13)	1.2 (3.0)	0.2 (0.51)	—	0.0 (0.0)	0.0 (0.0)	—	0.6 (1.5)	5.4 (14)	11.0 (28)	37.9 (96)
Average precipitation days (≥ 0.01 in)	11.8	9.4	11.4	11.1	12.3	12.1	7.1	7.5	8.2	8.4	11.1	12.3	122.7
Average snowy days (≥ 0.1 in)	9.4	6.8	5.1	1.6	0.3	0.1	0.0	0.0	0.0	0.9	5.4	9.8	39.4
Average relative humidity (%)	81.3	78.1	70.3	61.2	61.7	61.1	51.7	52.5	62.8	70.8	80.2	83.5	67.9
Mean monthly sunshine hours	95.8	133.0	209.3	245.0	280.5	311.1	389.3	334.8	264.7	194.3	99.5	82.9	2,640.2
Percentage possible sunshine	34	46	57	60	60	66	81	76	70	58	35	31	59
Source: NOAA (normals 1981−2010, relative humidity and sun 1961–1990)

== Demographics ==
=== Population centers ===
The Inland Northwest is home to seven Metropolitan Statistical Areas (MSA), eight if Western Montana is included, as defined by the U.S. Census Bureau. The two largest centers of population are formed out of multiple neighboring MSAs that are classified as Combined Statistical Areas. The largest in the region is the conurbation formed by the Spokane and Coeur d'Alene MSAs, the Spokane-Coeur d'Alene combined statistical area, which ranks 70th in the nation. The second largest center is the Kennewick-Richland-Walla Walla combined statistical area, which is made up of the Tri-Cities and Walla Walla and ranks as the 103rd largest in the nation.

=== Statistical areas ===
- Spokane-Spokane Valley-Coeur d'Alene CSA (pop. 793,285)
  - Spokane-Spokane Valley MSA (pop. 604,962)
  - Coeur d'Alene MSA (pop. 188,323)
- Kennewick-Richland-Walla Walla CSA (pop. 370,395)
  - Kennewick-Richland MSA (pop. 308,293)
  - Walla Walla MSA (pop. 62,682)
- Yakima MSA (pop. 256,035)
- Wenatchee-East Wenatchee MSA (pop. 123,342)
- * Missoula MSA (pop. 119,533)
- Lewiston MSA (pop. 64,851)

=== Largest cities by population ===
- Spokane, Washington (pop. 228,989)
- Spokane Valley, Washington (pop. 102,976)
- Yakima, Washington (pop. 96,968)
- Kennewick, Washington (pop. 83,921)
- Pasco, Washington (pop. 77,108)
- *Missoula, Montana (pop. 73,489)
- Richland, Washington (pop. 60,560)
- Coeur d'Alene, Idaho (pop. 54,628)
- Post Falls, Idaho (pop. 38,485)
- Wenatchee, Washington (pop. 35,508)
- Lewiston, Idaho (pop. 34,203)
- Walla Walla, Washington (pop. 34,060)
- Pullman, Washington (pop. 32,901)
- Moscow, Idaho (pop. 25,435)
- Moses Lake, Washington (pop. 25,146)
- *Kalispell, Montana (pop. 24,558)
- *Hermiston, Oregon (pop. 19,354)
- Ellensburg, Washington (pop. 18,666)
- *Pendleton, Oregon (pop. 17,107)
- Sunnyside, Washington (pop. 16,375)
- West Richland, Washington (pop. 16,295)
- Hayden, Idaho (pop. 15,570)
- East Wenatchee, Washington (pop. 14,158)
- Cheney, Washington (pop. 13,255)
- *La Grande, Oregon (pop. 13,026)
- Liberty Lake, Washington (pop. 12,003)
- Grandview, Washington (pop. 10,907)
- Airway Heights, Washington (pop. 10,757)

*Sometimes considered to be in the region

== Economy ==
Agriculture dominates the economy across large swaths of the region. The Palouse is a major producer of wheat and lentils. The Columbia Basin Project opened up 670,000 acres of the Columbia Plateau to irrigated farming. The Yakima Valley is the nation's leading grower of hops as well as a major wine producing region. Washington is second to only California nationally in terms of wine production, with Eastern Washington being home to 19 of the state's 20 recognized American Viticultural Areas.

== Culture ==
=== Arts and theater ===
In Spokane, the Davenport Arts District has the largest concentration of art galleries and is home to many of Spokane's main performing arts venues, including the Knitting Factory, Fox Theater, and Bing Crosby Theater. The Knitting Factory is a concert house that serves as a setting for many mainstream touring musicians and acts. The Martin Woldson Theater at the Fox, restored to its original 1931 Art Deco state after years of being derelict, is home to the Spokane Symphony Orchestra. The Metropolitan Performing Arts Center was restored in 1988 and renamed the Bing Crosby Theater in 2006 to honor the former Spokanite. Touring stand-up comedians are hosted by the Spokane Comedy Club. Theater is provided by Spokane's only resident professional company, The Modern Theater, though there are also the Spokane Civic Theatre and several other amateur community theaters and smaller groups. The First Interstate Center for the Arts often hosts large traveling exhibitions, shows, and tours.

In the Tri-Cities, the Richland Players Theater has offered live performances annually for over 70 years. Originally known as The Village Players, the theater group was created in 1944 to bring music, comedy, and cultural opportunities to the local community. Today, the theater has more than 7,500 attendees annually attracting audiences from across the region such as Spokane, Yakima, and Walla Walla. The theater also serves the local community by bringing local retirees to shows and accommodating the visually and hearing impaired (with the participation of non-profit United Blind).

=== Sports ===
The Inland Northwest is home to the Spokane Indians and Tri-City Dust Devils, professional teams in Minor League Baseball's Northwest League; the Western Hockey League's Spokane Chiefs and Tri-City Americans; and the Spokane Velocity and Spokane Zephyr teams in soccer.

== Media ==
The Spokane area is served by The Spokesman-Review, a daily newspaper, as well as the Inlander, an alternative weekly, and the bi-weekly Spokane Journal of Business. Spokane is the 73rd largest TV market in the nation according to Nielsen. KREM carries CBS on channel 2, KXLY carries ABC on channel 4, KHQ carries NBC on channel 6 and KAYU carries FOX on channel 28.

The Tri-Cities is served by the Tri-City Herald, a daily newspaper. Yakima is served by the Yakima Herald-Republic, a daily newspaper. The Tri-Cities and Yakima are considered one media market by Nielsen, the 122nd largest in the country. KNDU carries NBC, KVEW carries ABC, KEPR carries CBS and KFFX carries Fox.

== Gallery ==
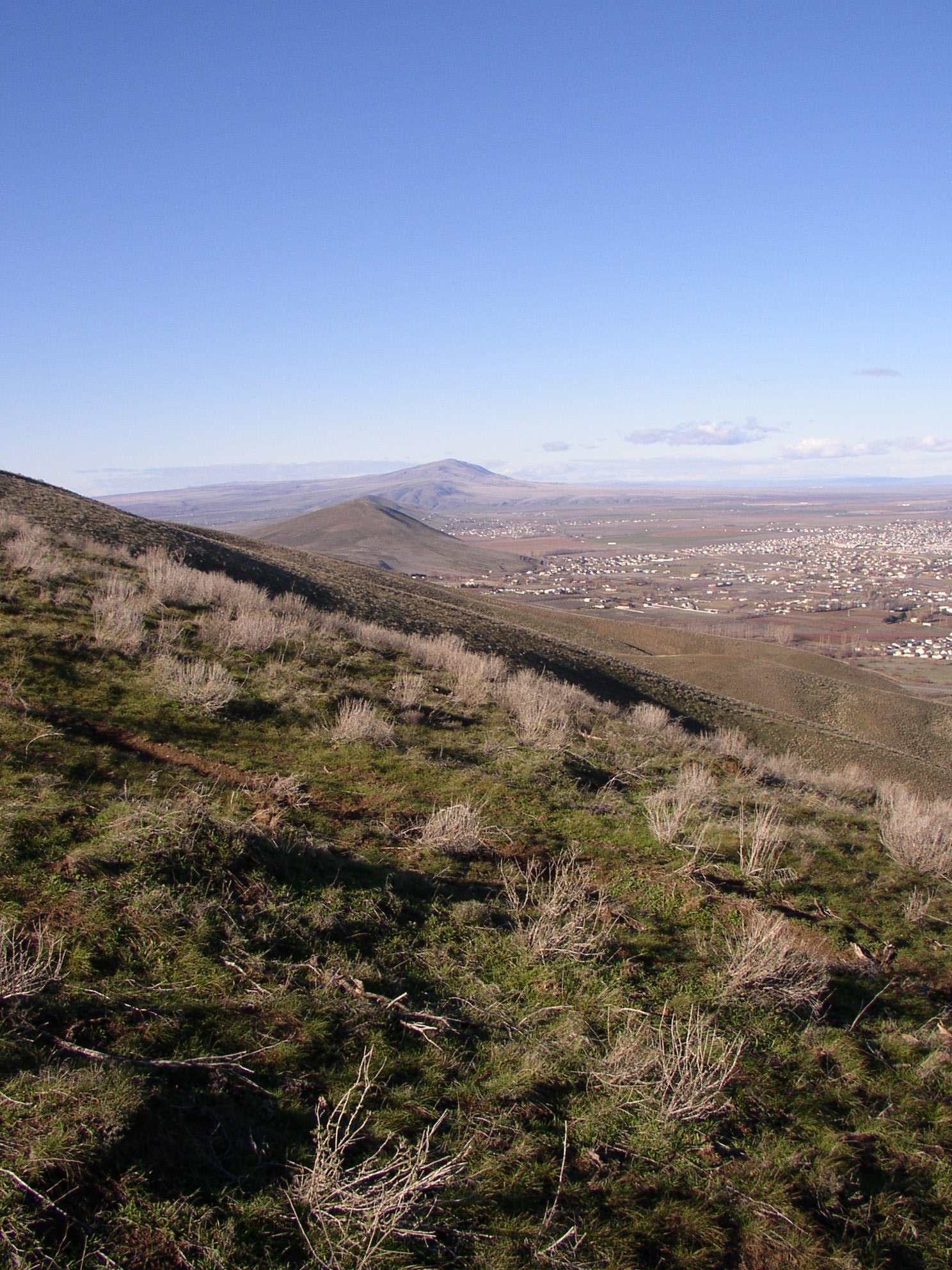
Hills near West Richland, Washington

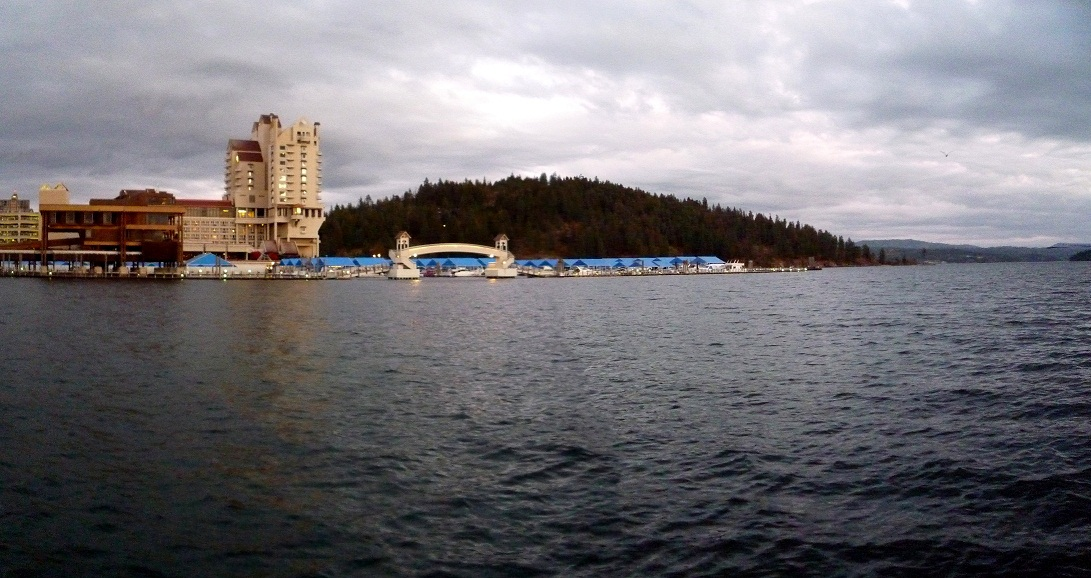
Coeur d'Alene

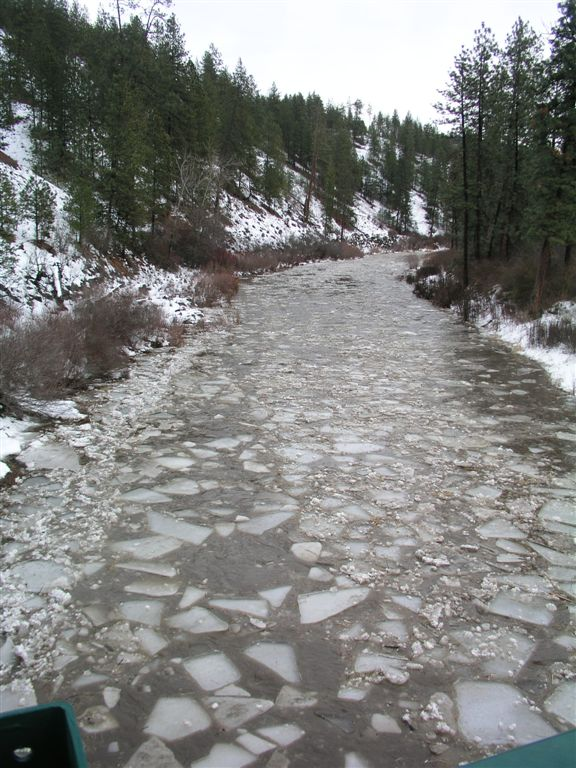
Latah Creek, a historical site

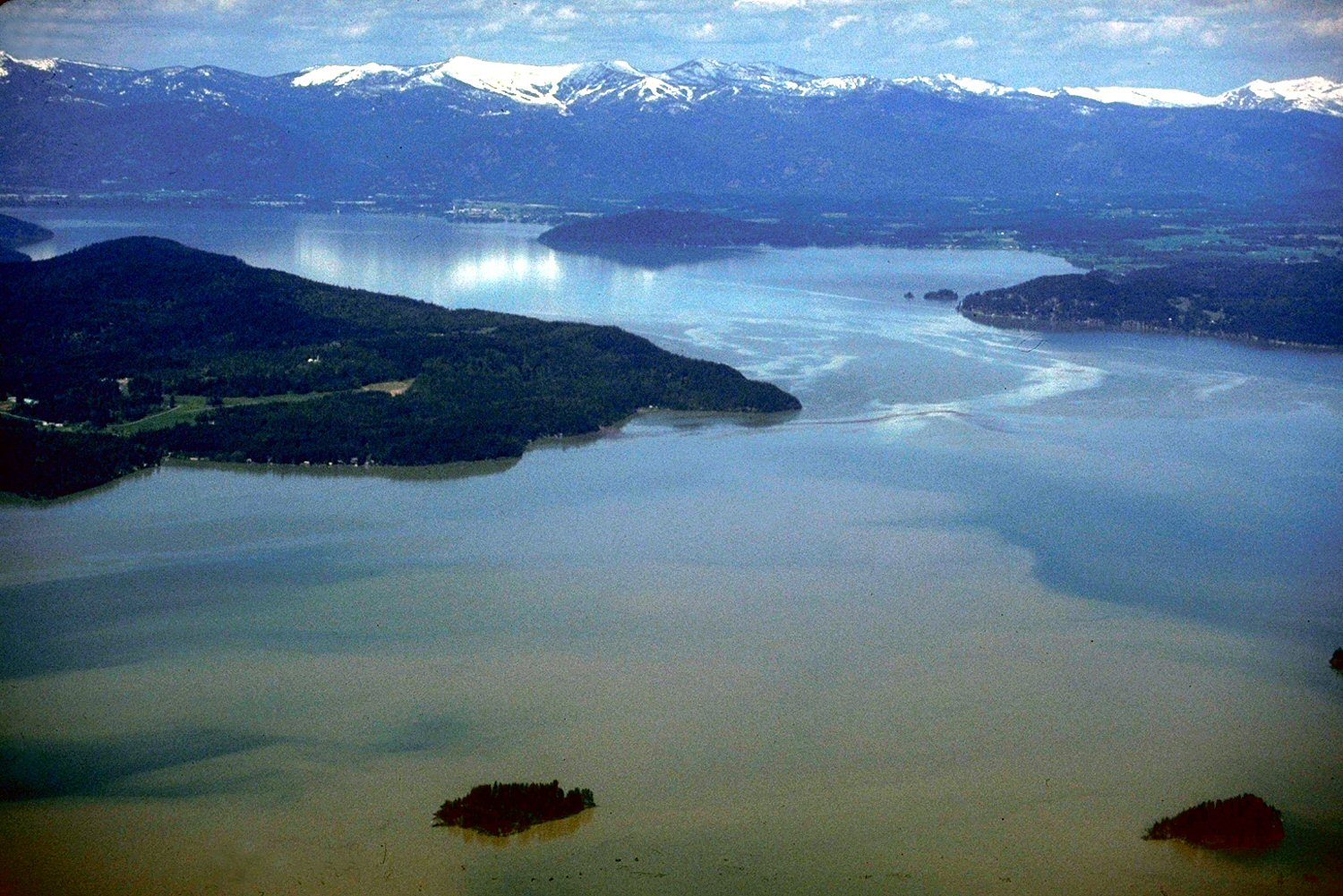
Lake Pend Oreille, 1,150 ft (350 m) deep

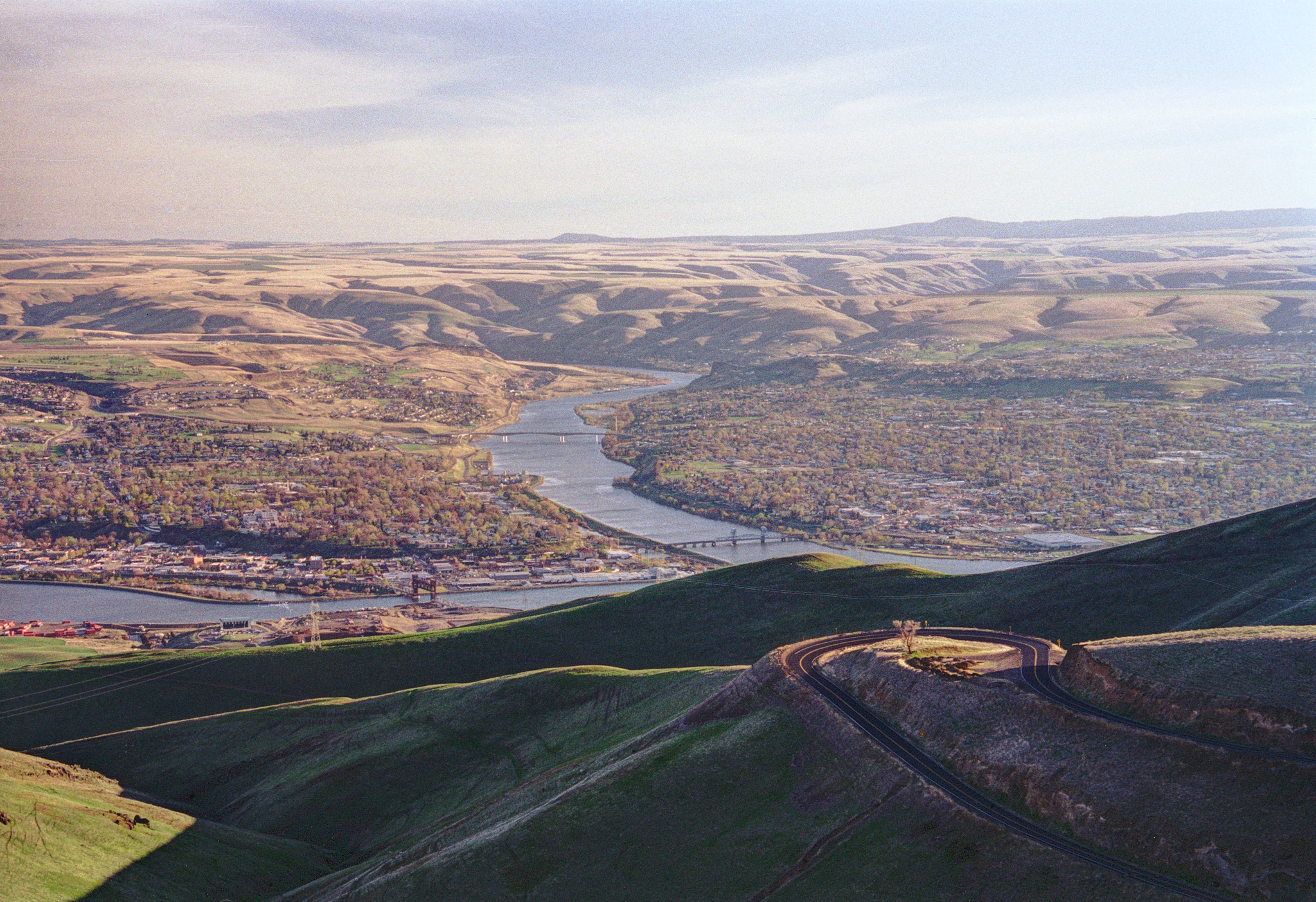
View from north of Lewiston, Idaho and Clarkston, Washington

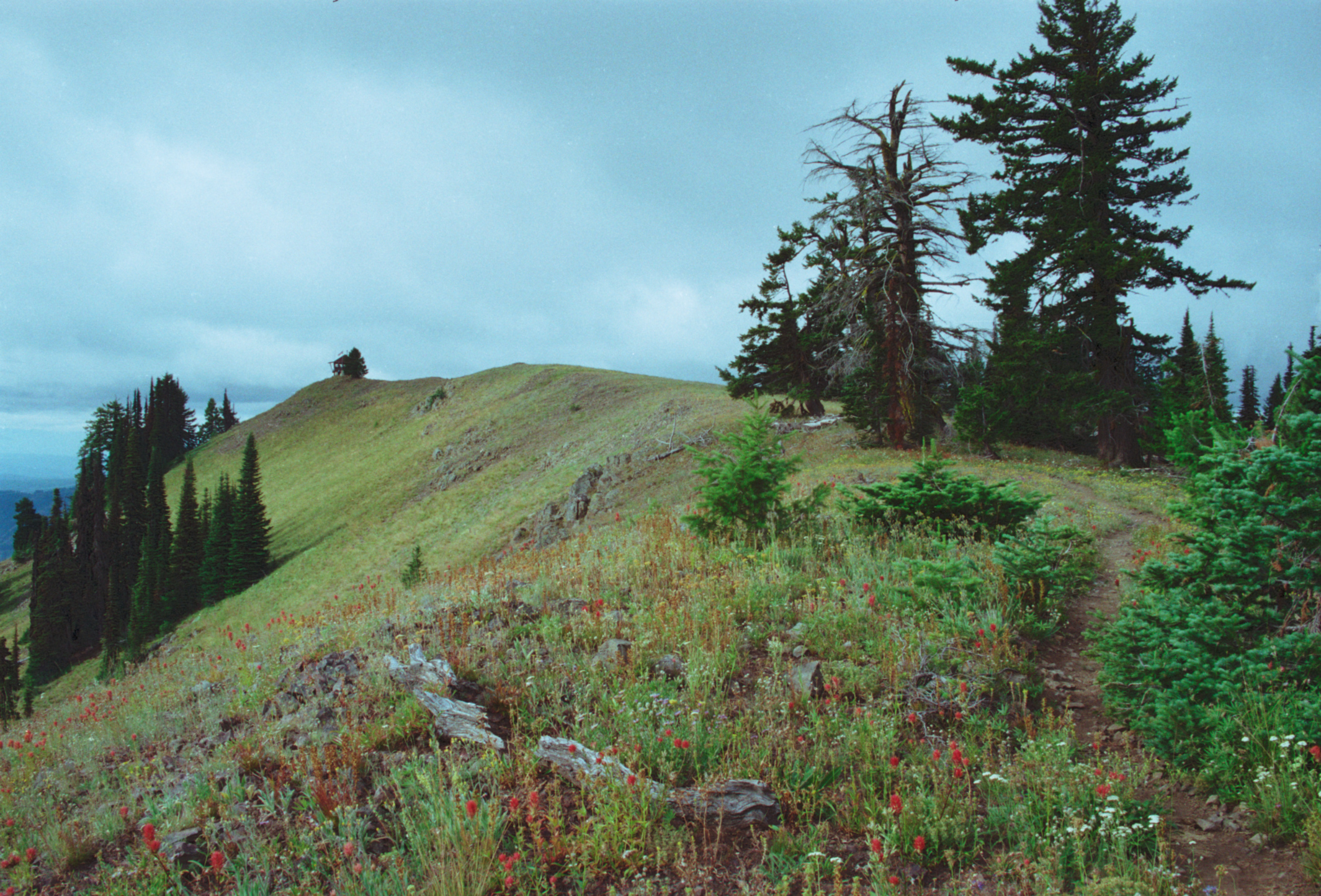
Oregon Butte in the Wenaha–Tucannon Wilderness

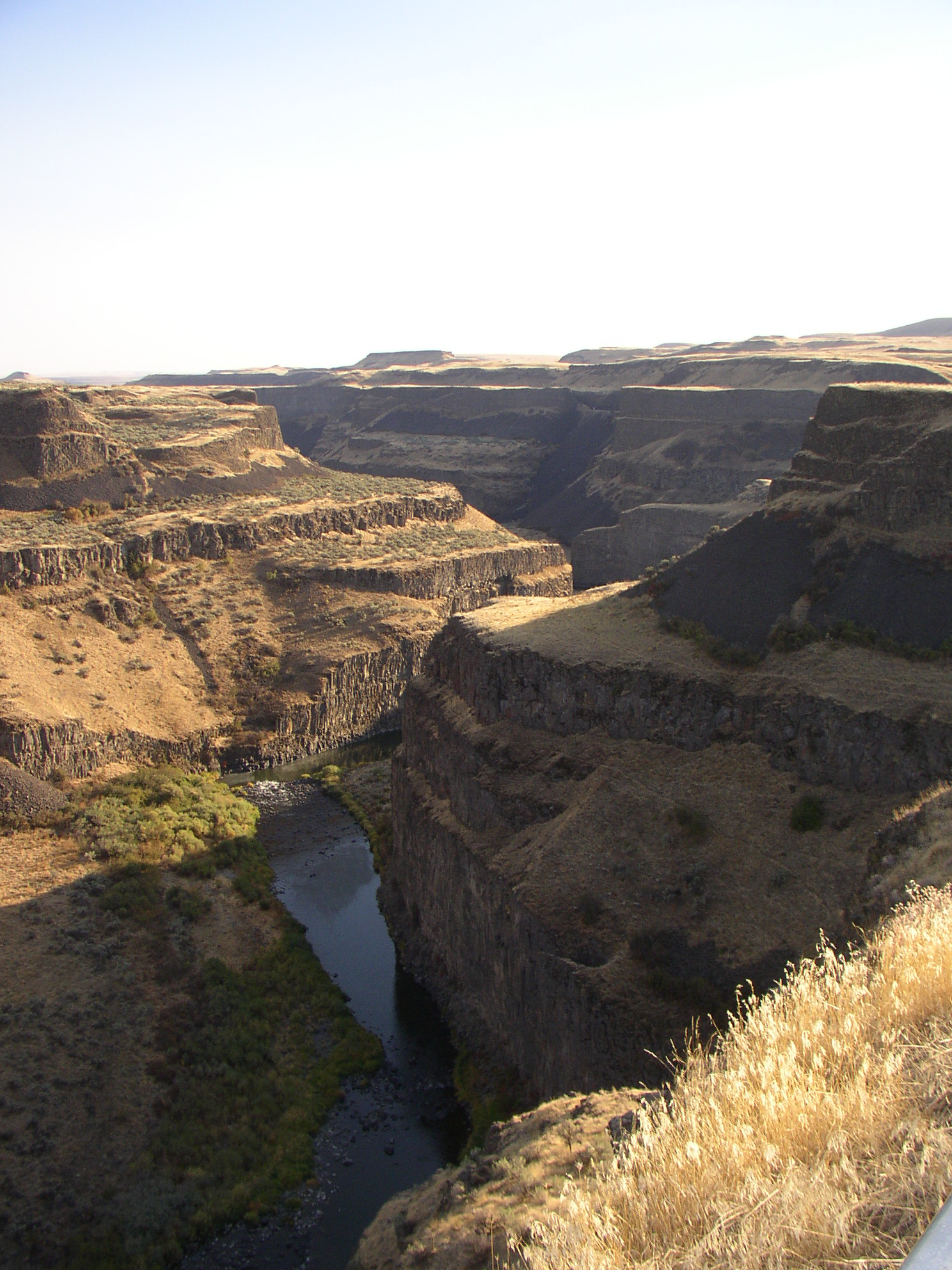
Palouse Canyon

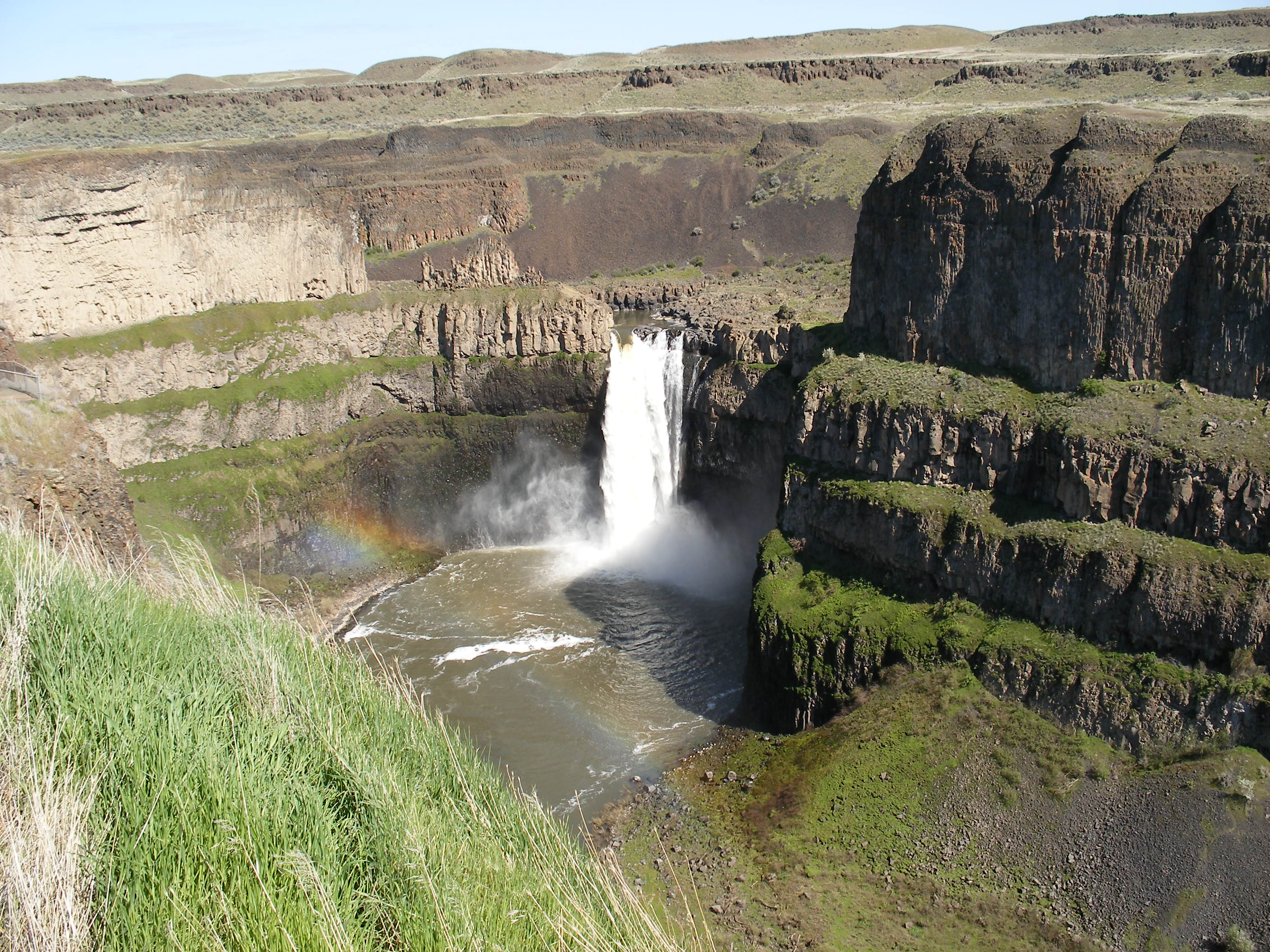
Palouse Falls

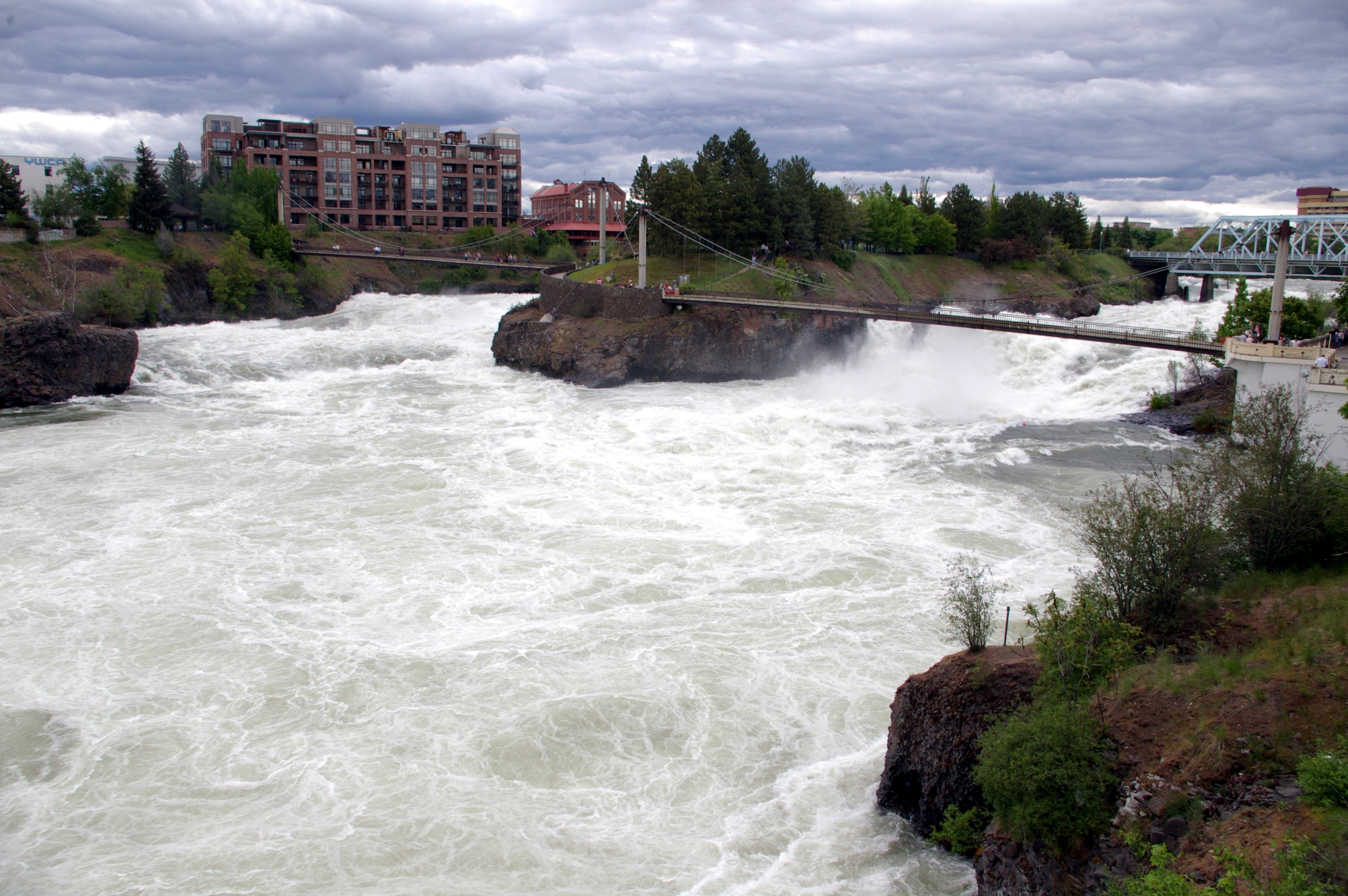
Spokane Falls

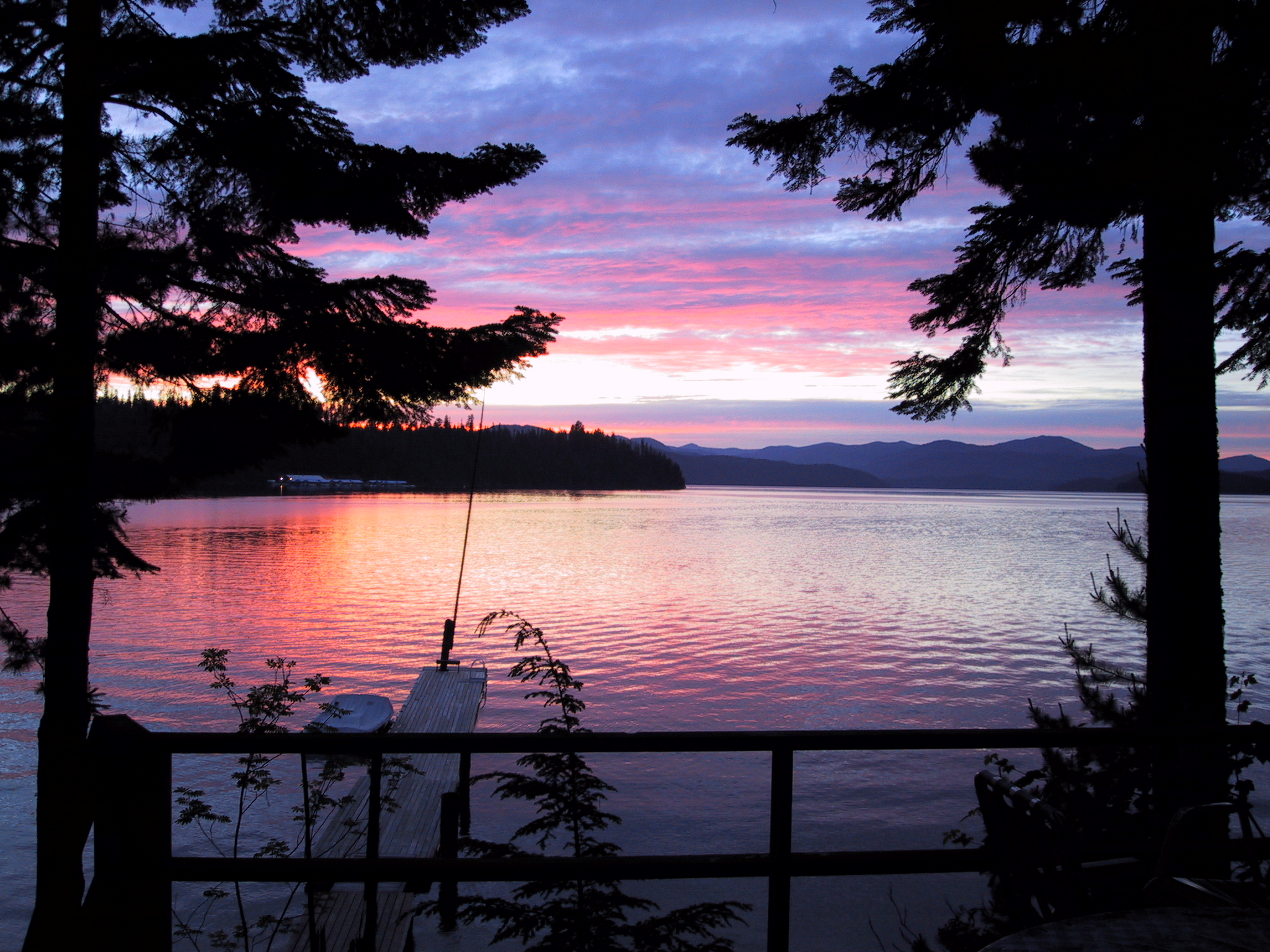
Priest Lake

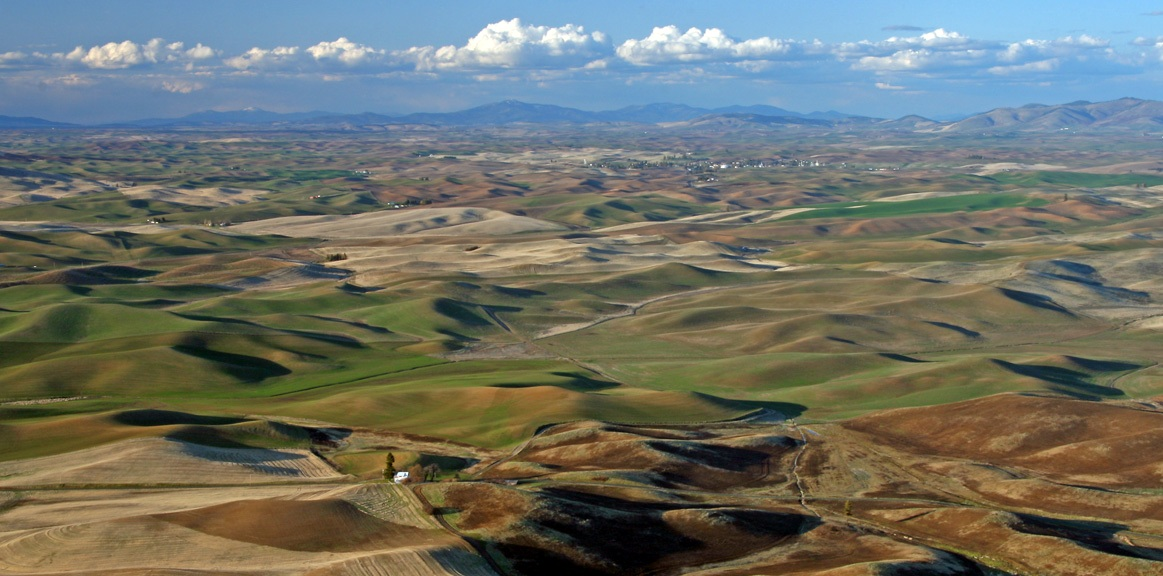
The Palouse from Steptoe Butte

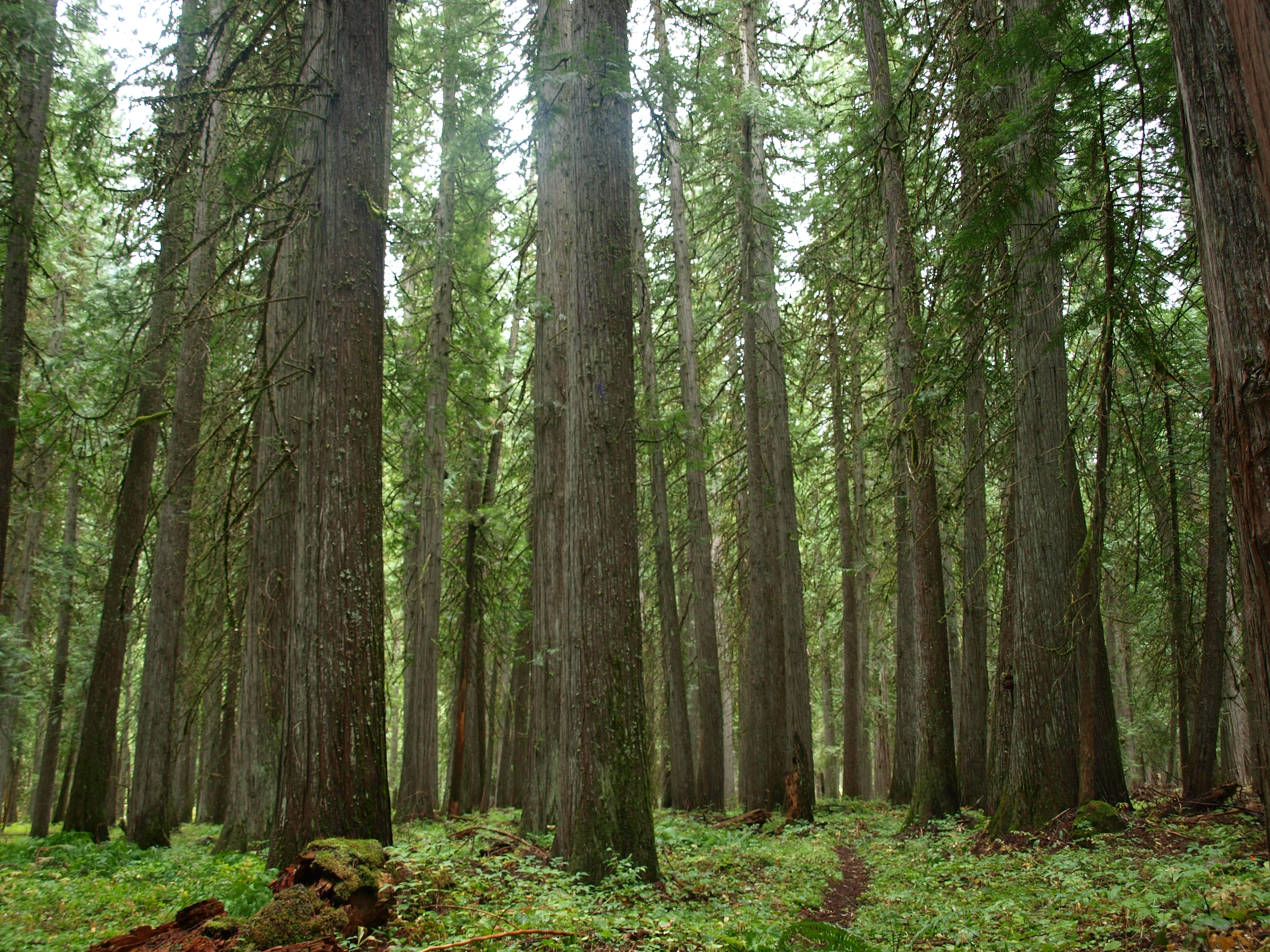
Selway–Bitterroot Wilderness, Idaho

== See also ==
- Palouse
- Columbia Plateau (ecoregion)
- Inland Empire Highway
- Silver Valley, Idaho
- Lincoln (proposed Northwestern state)
- Appaloosa
- Okanagan Country
