= Betsy Mix Cowles =

American abolitionist

Betsy Mix Cowles (February 9, 1810 – July 25, 1876) was an early leader in the United States abolitionist movement. She was an active and influential Ohio-based reformer, and was a noted feminist and an educator. She counted among her friends and acquaintances people such as Frederick Douglass, William Lloyd Garrison, Henry C. Wright, and Abby Kelley Foster.

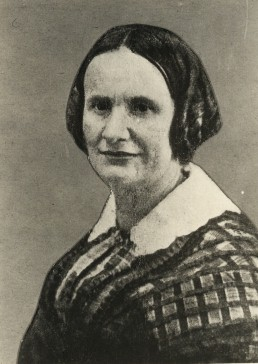

== Early life ==
She was born in Bristol, Connecticut, the eighth child of Giles Hooker Cowles and Sally White Cowles. Cowles did not marry and supported herself as a teacher and school system administrator in Ashtabula County, Ohio, where Cowles and her family settled.

Edwin Cowles, publisher of the Cleveland Leader in Cleveland, Ohio, and Alfred Cowles, Sr. who owned one third of the Chicago Tribune, were sons of her brother Edwin Weed Cowles and Almira Mills Foote.

== Accomplishments ==
Betsey Mix Cowles is known for her contributions to education, abolitionism, and women's rights in Ohio. As early as the late 1820s and early 1830s, she and her sister began opening infant schools in northeastern Ohio. Infant schools were a predecessor to kindergartens. After obtaining a degree from Oberlin College in 1840s, Cowles began a formal career as a teacher. She taught at a number of grammar schools, in addition to serving as a principal and evidentially as superintendent of the Painesville, Ohio, school system. It was very unusual to see women superintendents in the mid-19th century.

Even before she began teaching, Cowles was very interested in abolitionism. She became actively involved in a number of abolitionist organizations, often serving in leadership positions. Beginning in 1835, Cowles served as the secretary of the Ashtabula Female Anti-Slavery Society, one of the larger such organizations in the state with more than four hundred members. She began giving public speeches about abolitionism, gaining a reputation for her ability to articulate the importance of the anti-slavery cause. Even former slave and prominent abolitionist Frederick Douglass respected her abilities. In addition to her interests in the state of Ohio, Cowles was becoming prominent at the national level as well. Not everyone approved of her popularity, however. Many people believed that women should not speak in public, and Cowles's speeches left her open to criticism. In spite of this concern, she continued to actively participate in the anti-slavery movement.

In addition to working for the end of slavery in the United States, Cowles was very critical of what she viewed as the hypocrisy of many Ohioans. While they were willing to criticize slavery, many did not want to give free blacks rights in Ohio. Cowles spoke out against the Jim Crow Laws, which kept African Americans from voting in the state. At one point, she even quit a job when the school she was working at refused to admit black students.

Like many women who participated in the abolitionist cause, Cowles became interested in women's rights as well. In 1850, Ohio's first women's rights convention, the Ohio Women's Convention, met in Salem, Ohio. The attendees elected Cowles as president of the convention. Delegates knew that later in the year the state of Ohio was planning to convene a new constitutional convention, and the women wanted to have input into what rights women would be granted within the new Constitution of 1851. Cowles's election as convention president reflected her prominence and the amount of respect she had earned by this time.

In the late 1850s, Cowles's attention turned to higher education for women teachers. After briefly teaching at the McNeely Normal School in Hopedale, Ohio, she began teaching at the Illinois State Normal School in 1857.

On March 22, 2003, Cowles's former home in Austinburg, Ohio (currently owned by descendant Margaret Cowles Ticknor) was dedicated by the Ohio Historical Society as a known underground railroad station.

== Chronology of her life ==
- 1811 Cowles family settles in Austinburg, Ohio.
- 1827-32 (approximately) Betsy began teaching in area schools and in southeastern New York.
- 1830 Death of her mother, Sally White Cowles.
- 1832 Studied infant school in New York City.
- 1832-33 Conducted an infant school in Kinsman, Ohio.
- 1834 Secretary of the Young Ladies' Society for Intellectual Improvement in Austinburg.
- 1835 Death of her father, Giles Hooker Cowles.
- 1835 Principal leader of antislavery in Ashtabula County; organizer and secretary of the Ashtabula County Female Anti-Slavery Society.
- 1838-40 One of the first students of the Ladies' course at Oberlin College; member of third female graduating class.
- 1840-43 Taught in Portsmouth, Ohio.
- 1843-48 Preceptress of female department of Grand River Institute in Austinburg.
- 1845 Became a Garrisonian Abolitionist through influence of Abby Kelley Foster.
- 1846-47 Conducted antislavery fairs in Ohio; attended antislavery fairs and meetings in Boston.
- 1848 May have attended Woman's Rights Convention in Seneca Falls, New York.
- 1848 Teacher and principal of female department of grammar school in Massillon, Ohio.
- 1850-55 Superintendent of girls' grammar school and girls' high school in Canton, Ohio.
- 1850 Presiding officer of first Woman's Rights Convention in Ohio at Salem, Ohio.
- 1851 Attended Akron Woman's Rights Convention and gave report on "Labor and Wages."
- 1852 Member of executive committee of newly formed Ohio Woman's Rights Association.
- 1856-58 Supervisor of practice teachers and model school at the McNeely Normal School in Hopedale, Ohio.
- 1858 Instructor, Illinois State Normal University at Bloomington.
- 1858-60 Superintendent of schools in Painesville, Ohio.
- 1860-62 Taught in Delhi, New York.
- 1862 Retired to Austinburg, Ohio, because of eye trouble.
- 1865 Lost sight of one eye.
- 1869 Death of her sister Cornelia Cowles.
- 1876, July 25 Death of Betsy Mix Cowles.
