= William H. Cowles III =

United States journalist

- Born: March 4, 1932
- Died: April 18, 1992 (aged 60); Spokane, Washington
- Occupation: Journalist

William H. Cowles III (March 4, 1932 – April 18, 1992) was an American journalist. He was born in Spokane, Washington, to William Hutchinson Cowles and Margaret Paine Cowles, and was a descendant of Alfred Cowles Sr. of the Chicago Tribune. He was the publisher of The Spokesman-Review, the same job held by his father and grandfather.

== Biography ==
Cowles was born in Spokane, Washington, and completed his Bachelor of Arts degree from Yale University in 1953. During and after the Korean War, he served in the United States Naval Reserve on a destroyer. Upon the conclusion of the war, Cowles resumed his education and earned a Juris Doctor degree from Harvard University in 1959. Subsequently, he commenced his career at The Spokesman-Review and, after gaining experience, ascended to the position of publisher in 1970.

Throughout his career, Cowles held various notable positions as a journalist. He served as the third president of The Spokesman-Review, a daily broadsheet newspaper in Spokane, Washington. In addition to this role, Cowles held the position of head of the American Newspaper Publishers Association, an organization that represents the interests of newspaper publishers in the United States. He also acted as a director for both The Seattle Times, a daily newspaper based in Seattle, Washington, and Allied Daily Newspapers, a group of daily and non-daily newspapers in the Pacific Northwest. Cowles was also a former member of the board of directors for the Associated Press.

He died on April 18, 1992, of a heart attack.

== See also ==
- Cowles Company
