= James Waterman Glover =

American mathematician, statistician and actuary

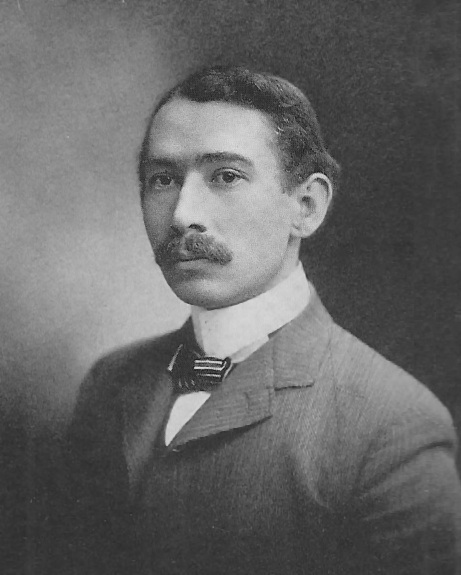
- Born: July 24, 1868; Clio, Michigan, US
- Died: July 15, 1941 (aged 72); Ann Arbor, Michigan, US
- Education: University of Michigan (BaSc); Harvard University (PhD)
- Occupations: Mathematician, statistician, and actuary
- Employer: University of Michigan
- Notable work: Properties of the Partial Differential Equation

James Waterman Glover (July 24, 1868 – July 15, 1941) was an American mathematician, statistician, and actuary.

== Biography ==
James Waterman Glover was born in Clio, Michigan on July 24, 1868. He received his bachelor's degree from the University of Michigan in 1892, and in 1895 his Ph.D. in mathematics under Maxime Bôcher from Harvard University with thesis Properties of the Partial Differential Equation Δy + ky = 0. He became in 1895 an instructor, in 1903 an assistant professor, in 1906 an associate professor, and in 1911 a full professor at the University of Michigan, retiring as professor emeritus in 1938.

His keen interest in the theory of probability led him in 1902 to introduce a course in actuarial theory—the first course ever offered in this subject by any University in this country. As a result of his pioneering in this new field, his services were demanded by various states, the United States government, and by Canada in connection with various insurance, pension and banking investigations. He has also served various insurance companies in the capacity of consulting actuary. From 1910 to 1929 he served the U. S. Census Bureau as Expert Special Agent and during this time the United States Life Tables were prepared under his supervision ... From 1930 to 1932, while on leave of absence ... Professor Glover served as President of the Teachers Insurance and Annuity Association of America.

From 1927 to 1934 he was the chair of the University of Michigan's department of mathematics. His graduate students include Cecil C. Craig.

In 1915 Glover was elected a Fellow of the Casualty Actuarial Society. In 1916 he was named a Fellow of the American Statistical Association. In 1924 he was an Invited Speaker of the ICM in Toronto.

He died at his home in Ann Arbor, Michigan on July 15, 1941.

== Selected publications ==
=== Articles ===
- Glover, James W. (March 1915). "A general formula for the valuation of securities". American Mathematical Monthly. 22 (3): 82–88. doi:10.2307/2971891. hdl:2027/mdp.39015040114004. JSTOR 2971891.
- Glover, James W. (January 5, 1917). "The New United States Life Tables. Their Purpose and What They Show". Public Health Reports. 32 (1): 1–39. doi:10.2307/4574389. JSTOR 4574389. PMC 1999673. PMID 19314545.
- "Requirements for Statisticians and Their Training: I. Statistical Teaching in American Colleges and Universities". Journal of the American Statistical Association. 21 (156): 419–424. 1926. doi:10.1080/01621459.1926.10502195.

=== Books ===
- Mathematics of annuities and insurance. Edwards bros. 1905.
- with Laurence Ilsley Hewes: Highway bonds : a compilation of data and an analysis of economic features affecting construction and maintenance of highways financed by bond issues, and the theory of highway bond calculations. Bulletin of the U.S. Department of Agriculture; no. 136. U.S. Dept. of Agriculture. 1915.
- Double, triple, and multiple indemnity. 1922.
- with Harry C. Carver: Introduction to mathematical statistics. Edwards Brothers. 1924.
- with Earl C. Wightman: Life insurance accounting. Edwards brothers. 1930.
