= Cowles House =

Cowles House may refer to:

in the United States

(by state)

- Gen. George Cowles House, Farmington, CT, listed on the NRHP in Connecticut
- Capt. Josiah Cowles House, Southington, CT, listed on the NRHP in Connecticut
- Cowles House (Macon, Georgia), listed on the NRHP in Georgia
- Jerry Cowles Cottage, Macon, GA, listed on the NRHP in Georgia
- Cowles, George H and Alice Spaulding, House, Osceola, IA, listed on the NRHP in Iowa
- Cowles House (East Lansing, Michigan), at Michigan State University
- W. T. Cowles House, Glens Falls, NY, listed on the NRHP in New York
- Brown-Cowles House and Cowles Law Office, Wilkesboro, NC, listed on the NRHP in North Carolina
