= Electric Smelting and Aluminum Company =

Industrial corporation

- Type: Private
- Industry: Aluminum, bronze, carborundum, copper, alloys
- Founded: c. 1886 to 1940s
- Founder: Alfred H. Cowles, Eugene H. Cowles
- Headquarters: 555 Jackson Street, Lockport, New York, United States—before 1895, the Cowles Electric Smelting and Aluminum Company Cowles Syndicate Company, Limited, Staffordshire, England

The Electric Smelting and Aluminum Company, founded as Cowles Electric Smelting and Aluminium Company (Note: Joseph W. Richards, founder and later president of the Electrochemical Society, reported in 1891 that Cowles had gone to court to change the company's name from its original Aluminium, in line with then U.S. scientific usage, to Aluminum, in line with Noah Webster's preferred and Humphry Davy's original spelling. See aluminium#Etymology.), and Cowles Syndicate Company, Limited, was formed in the United States and England during the mid-1880s to extract and supply valuable metals. Founded by two brothers from Ohio, the Cowles companies are remembered for producing alloys in quantity sufficient for commerce. Their furnaces were electric arc smelters, one of the first viable methods for extracting metals.

The businesses of the era dramatically increased the supply of aluminium, a valuable element not found in nature in pure form, and reduced its price. The Cowles process was the immediate predecessor to the Hall-Héroult process—today in nearly universal use more than a century after it was discovered by Charles Martin Hall and Paul Héroult and adapted by others including Carl Josef Bayer. Because of the patent landscape, the Cowles companies found themselves in court. Judges eventually acknowledged their innovations many years after the companies formed, and one brother received two separate settlements.

== Early years ==
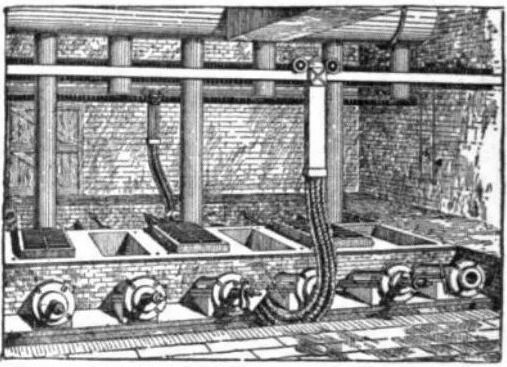
Cowles in Stoke-on-Trent

Eugene H. Cowles and Alfred H. Cowles, sons of newspaper publisher Edwin Cowles of Cleveland, Ohio, built high temperature furnaces during the late 1880s in Lockport, New York, and in Stoke-upon-Trent in England, based on the furnace of Carl Wilhelm Siemens. Charles F. Mabery, at the time of what is today the Case School of Engineering, contributed expertise in chemistry.

The family had purchased a copper zinc mine on the Pecos River in New Mexico in 1883. Eugene that year designed a furnace to extract zinc from the mine's ores. Two young employees were testing four furnaces in a Cleveland laboratory by 1885. Their first plant was built to extract aluminium, in 1886 using hydropower from a tailrace of Niagara Falls on the Niagara River.

Adolphe Minet wrote a sympathetic assessment twenty years later in 1905 from the perspective of Paris. The Cowles furnace was electrochemical, one of two kinds of processes applied to producing aluminum during the 19th century, and belonged to the electrothermic group that includes Héroult (alloys), Brin, Bessemer, Stephanite and Moissan (carbide). Minet thought Cowles was the first great advance in electrometallurgy at least for many years, calling it a "practical" furnace yielding alloy up to 20 percent aluminum. The first was begun in 1884 and the best was tested in Cleveland in 1886. Minet gave the real credit though to other chemists who saw how to produce "pure aluminum".

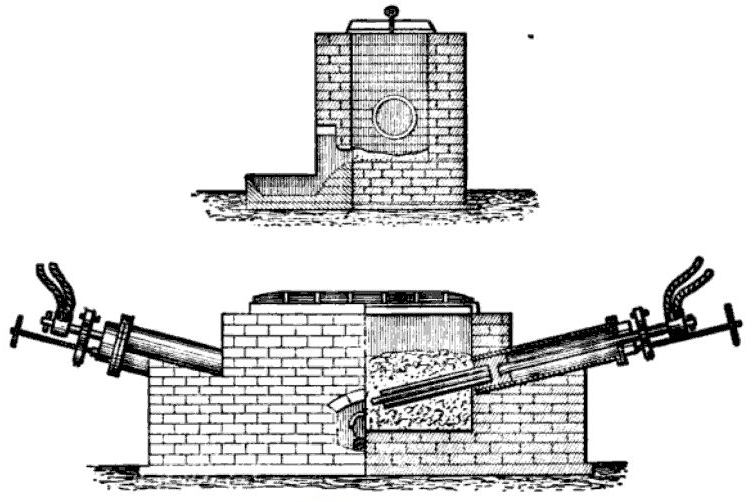
Design of a Cowles furnace

William Frishmuth, who as the sole aluminium supplier in the United States built the Washington Monument's aluminum cap in 1884, was one among those who worried that "foreign capitalists" were about to control the world aluminium market.

Charles Martin Hall was a graduate of Oberlin College in Ohio who had discovered in February 1886 an electrolytic process for aluminum extraction. His patent application in July collided with Paul Héroult's application for the same idea, "electrolysis of alumina in cryolite" and for which Héroult had received the patent in France in April. Hall proved his February date and was awarded the patent in the U.S. Hall made a licensing agreement and worked with the Cowles at the facility in Lockport with the hopes of moving his ideas from the laboratory into production.

Cowles did not choose to use the Hall patent. Their reason is unclear—some in Lockport remember it as disagreement about "external heat and copper electrodes" and "internally heated furnace and carbon electrodes", and Alcoa culture remembers it as an attempt to "suppress his new process by buying him out". Hall left after one year, in July 1888, to found the Pittsburgh Reduction Company which today is named Alcoa.

== Later years ==
In 1891 after Cowles began to advertise "pure aluminum" they were sued by the Pittsburgh Reduction Company. The judge announced his decision in January 1893, finding them to be infringing the patent of Hall and having gained knowledge of his process by hiring away a chemist named Hobbs who was the foreman in Pittsburgh. In 1903 the Cowles won a countersuit. The surviving brother Alfred chose to stop work on aluminum and Cowles received royalties and a US$1.35 million payment in settlement. The appeal said the patent application of Charles S. Bradley which Cowles had acquired in 1885 and Alcoa had acquired from Cowles in 1904 hinted at an internally rather than externally heated furnace.

The Cowles facility in England became part of British Aluminium in the late 1880s. In 1893, after Eugene's death, Maybery questioned a presentation that to him indicated the Cowles patents were infringed by the carborundum process of Edward Acheson (Acheson process). In 1900 Cowles received a $300,000 payment from the carborundum company. The judges' decision gave "priority broadly to the Messrs. Cowles for reducing ores and other substances by the incandescent method".

== Influence ==
The achievements of Hall in the U.S. and of Héroult in Europe, and their influence on aluminum companies, some through Héroult's Société Electrometallurgique Française, have been called one of the greatest events in metallurgy. Over ten years, aluminum output in the U.S. increased by 100,000 times and its price dropped to about 2% of its cost before their discovery. Cowles engineered a separate venture and did not share that glory, but sometimes the brothers are credited with envisioning and promoting what was the beginning of electrical smelting on a large scale.
