= Spokane Journal of Business =

Newspaper

- Type: Bi-weekly newspaper
- Owner: Cowles Company
- Editor: Linn Parish
- Founded: 1986
- Headquarters: Spokane, Washington; United States
- ISSN: 1075-6124
- OCLC number: 782074213
- Website: www.spokanejournal.com

The Spokane Journal of Business is an independent business newspaper founded in February 1986 which covers news primarily in Eastern Washington State and Northern Idaho including Spokane, Washington, and Coeur d’Alene, Idaho. The Journal is published bi-weekly, 26 times a year, and has an audited circulation of about 14,000.

Erica Bullock is currently the editor of the publication and Dylan Harris is the deputy editor.
