= Alfred Cowles Jr. =

American lawyer

Alfred Cowles Jr. (January 5, 1865 – January 15, 1939) was a director of the Chicago Tribune company for 48 years.

== Early life and education ==
Born in Chicago, he was the eldest son of Alfred Cowles Sr. and Sarah Frances Cowles (née Hutchinson). His father served as bookkeeper, then secretary-treasurer of the Chicago Tribune, and worked closely with owner Joseph Medill.

Alfred Junior graduated from Yale University in 1886. During his senior year, Cowles was captain of the Yale champion varsity crew which set an upstream record on the Thames River which remained unbroken until 1923. He was a member of Skull and Bones.

He engaged in post-graduate work, at Yale Law School from 1887 to 1888, and Northwestern University from 1888 to 1889. Over the years, Cowles continued to be involved with the Yale crew, serving as chief advisor to head coach Edson F. Gallaudet in 1899.

== Career ==
Following admission to the bar in 1889, Cowles practiced law in Chicago for only a few years. He became a director of the Chicago Tribune in 1891, two years after his father died. He served as secretary and treasurer of the Tribune from 1889 to 1901.

He was also a director of the Continental Illinois Bank and Trust, as well as the American Radiator Company. A campaigner against government waste, he served as president of the Civic Federation and the Bureau of Public Efficiency from 1932 to 1935.

== Personal life ==
After graduating from Yale, he married Elizabeth Cheney of Manchester, Connecticut, with whom he had four children: Alfred Cowles III (1891–1984), Knight Cheney Cowles (b. 1892), John Cheney Cowles (b. 1894) and Thomas Hooker Cowles (b. 1895). Alfred Jr. played golf and enjoyed shooting.

== Death and legacy ==
In 1928, Alfred Jr., his brother William H. Cowles, and their sister Sarah Frances Stewart donated $350,000 to Yale University to fund the Alfred Cowles Sf. Foundation for the study of government and public affairs.

He had heart disease and died from pneumonia at his home at 1130 Lake Shore Drive, Chicago, on January 15, 1939. He left an estate worth $985,000 when he died.
