= Alfred Cowles =

American economist (1891–1984)

- Born: Alfred Cowles III; September 15, 1891; Chicago, Illinois, US
- Died: December 28, 1984 (aged 93); Lake Forest, Illinois, US
- Other name: Bob Cowles
- Occupations: Economist, businessman
- Organization: Cowles Commission for Research in Economics
- Relatives: Alfred Cowles Sr., grandfather; Alfred Cowles Jr., father
- Website: cowles.yale.edu/people/alfred-cowles

Alfred Cowles III (September 15, 1891 – December 28, 1984) was an American economist, businessman, and founder of the Cowles Commission for Research in Economics, an influential research institute which advanced the field of econometrics in the 20th century. When he established the Cowles Commission in 1932, he was intent on making economics more of a "science" by collecting data and applying modern mathematical and statistical techniques. Although he shared the same name as his father and grandfather, both of whom had been involved with the Chicago Tribune Company, he preferred to be known simply as Alfred Cowles.

== Early life and education ==
Born on September 15, 1891, Alfred's family members called him "Bob". He was the grandson of Alfred Cowles Sr., who served as bookkeeper, then secretary-treasurer, of the Chicago Tribune. His father, Alfred Cowles Jr., was a director of the Chicago Tribune Company for 48 years. His mother, Elizabeth Cheney Cowles, died of lung disease in 1898, leaving Bob and his three younger brothers to be raised by their father.

Like his father and uncle, Alfred Cowles III attended Yale University, where he was a member of Skull and Bones. He graduated from Yale in 1913. He was self-taught in the emerging field of modern statistics in the 1920s.

== Career ==
After graduating, Cowles moved to Spokane, Washington, to work as a reporter for The Spokesman-Review and learn about the newspaper business from his uncle, William Hutchinson Cowles. In 1914, he contracted typhoid fever. Upon recovering, he moved to Chicago, and formed Alfred Cowles Railroad, an investment firm that bought and sold small railroad companies. Within two years of starting, however, he contracted tuberculosis and entered Cragmor Sanatorium in Colorado Springs, Colorado, for one year.

Cowles became the principal in his own investment company in Colorado Springs, but withdrew from the financial markets prior to the Wall Street Crash of 1929. In the wake of the stock market crash, he grew increasingly skeptical of recommendations made by investment advisors. In 1931, he closed his own market forecast newsletter, published by Cowles and Company, telling his subscribers that he realized he did not know enough to predict what would happen in the economy and in the stock market, and would conduct further research before resuming his forecasts.

By 1932, Cowles was convinced that the entire field was flawed and that there was very little understanding of how to make economic predictions. He began a project to analyze the effectiveness of investment advisory newsletters, to determine how they compared to actual stock market performance. Dutch biochemist Charles H. Boissevain, his friend and head of the Colorado Foundation for Research in Tuberculosis, advised him that multiple-correlation analysis could be applied to economic research, and recommended that he speak to Harold T. Davis, a mathematician at Indiana University who spent his summers in Colorado Springs and a member of the fledgling Econometric Society. Cowles called Davis to ask if it was possible to compute a correlation coefficient in a problem involving 24 variables. Davis suggested that the calculations could be performed by Hollerith punch card machines, developed by a company that would later become International Business Machines (IBM). Cowles acquired a Hollerith computer and worked with Davis on the problem. When it turned out that the machines were ill-suited to the task, Cowles decided to perform a series of linear regressions to test the hypothesis that market analysts using current estimation techniques could not outperform random guessing.

Cowles founded the Cowles Commission for Research in Economics in 1932. Its original offices were in the Mining Exchange Building in Colorado Springs. Encouraged by Davis, Cowles wrote to Yale economist Irving Fisher to offer funding for the Econometric Society and to underwrite a new academic journal, Econometrica, in return for Fisher's assistance in assembling a "brain trust" of leading scholars to work with the Cowles Commission. In addition to Harold T. Davis, methodological guidance in the early years was provided by actuarial mathematician James Glover of University of Michigan and Thornton Fry of Bell Laboratories. The journal Econometrica debuted in 1933, with Cowles as the circulation manager and treasurer of the Econometric Society. The Commission offered classes through Colorado College and held conferences attended by researchers from around the world.

In 1939, both Cowles and the Cowles Commission moved from Colorado Springs to Chicago, in part to bring the Commission closer to the University of Chicago economics department. The most famous monograph by the Cowles Commission was on the effects of atomic energy on the economy, which was published in 1950.

In 1955, the commission moved to Yale and became known as the Cowles Foundation.

== Board memberships ==
Cowles was a director of the Webb-Waring Institute for Medical Research, which was focused on tuberculosis research. His first academic journal article was published in the Journal of the American Statistical Association, in which he showed that climate was a significant determinant on death from tuberculosis in the United States.

He was a fellow and treasurer of the Econometric Society.

== Personal life and death ==
In 1916, Cowles moved in with his aunt Sarah Cowles Stewart and her husband Philip Stewart, at their house on Millionaire's Row at Colorado Springs. He was based in Colorado Springs for 20 years, although he also spent some years in Chicago.

Cowles married Betsy Strong, a student at Vassar College and friend of his cousin Laura Cheney, in 1924. In 1925, they adopted a son, and in 1928, they adopted a daughter. Eleven years apart in age, Bob and Betsy struggled to find common interests and eventually divorced in 1939. He remarried on October 24, 1949, to Louise Lamb Phelps.

Cowles died at the age of 93 on December 28, 1984, in Lake Forest, Illinois.

== Selected works ==
- ——— (1944). "Stock Market Forecasting". Econometrica. 12 (3–4): 206–214. doi:10.2307/1905433. JSTOR 1905433.
- ——— (1960). "A Revision of Previous Conclusions Regarding Stock Price Behavior". Econometrica. 28 (4): 909–915. doi:10.2307/1907573. JSTOR 1907573.
