= Edwin Cowles =

American journalist

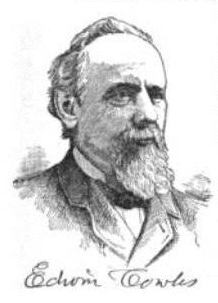
- Born: 1825; Austinburg, Ohio
- Died: 1890 (aged 64–65)
- Occupation: publisher
- Known for: Leader

Edwin Cowles (1825–1890) was the publisher of The Cleveland Leader. During the President Abraham Lincoln administration and Civil War, he was appointed as US postmaster of Cleveland, serving April 4, 1861 - July 11, 1865. He later served as Vice-President of the 1884 Republican National Convention. He was the elder brother of Alfred Cowles, Sr., also a newspaper publisher.

== See also ==
- Cowles Publishing Company
