= Cowles Foundation =

Economic research institute at Yale University

Coordinates: 41.313757°N 72.92352°W

- Formation: 1932
- Location: Yale University, New Haven, Connecticut, United States
- Director: Larry Samuelson
- Website: cowles.econ.yale.edu

The Cowles Foundation for Research in Economics is an economic research institute at Yale University.

== History ==
It was created as the Cowles Commission for Research in Economics at Colorado Springs in 1932 by businessman and economist Alfred Cowles. In 1939, the Cowles Commission moved to the University of Chicago under Theodore O. Yntema. Jacob Marschak directed it from 1943 until 1948, when Tjalling C. Koopmans assumed leadership. Increasing opposition to the Cowles Commission from the department of economics of the University of Chicago during the 1950s impelled Koopmans to persuade the Cowles family to move the commission to Yale University in 1955 where it became the Cowles Foundation.

As its motto Theory and Measurement implies, the Cowles Commission focuses on linking economic theory to mathematics and statistics. Its advances in economics involved the creation and integration of general equilibrium theory and econometrics.

The thrust of the Cowles approach was a specific, probabilistic framework in estimating simultaneous equations to model an economy. Its ultimate goal in doing so was to gain policy insight. The Cowles approach structured its models from a priori economic theory. One of its main contributions was in exposing the bias of ordinary least squares regression in identifying coefficient estimates. Consequently, Cowles researchers developed new methods such as the indirect least squares, instrumental variable methods, the full information maximum likelihood method, and the limited information maximum likelihood method. All of these methods used theoretical, a priori restrictions. According to an article by Carl F. Christ, the Cowles approach was grounded on certain assumptions:

1. Simultaneous economic behavior;
2. Linear or logarithmic equations and disturbances;
3. Systematic, observable variables without error;
4. Discrete variable changes as opposed to continuous;
5. A priori determination of exogeneity and endogeneity;
6. The existence of a reduced form;
7. Independence of the explanatory variables;
8. A priori identified structural equations;
9. Normally distributed disturbances with zero means, finite and constant covariances, a nonsingular covariance matrix, and serial independence;
10. A dynamically stable system of equations.

== Notable alumni ==
Several Cowles associates have won a Nobel Memorial Prize in Economic Sciences for research done while at the Cowles Commission. These include Tjalling Koopmans, Kenneth Arrow, Gérard Debreu, James Tobin, Franco Modigliani, Herbert A. Simon, Joseph E. Stiglitz, Lawrence Klein, Trygve Haavelmo, Leonid Hurwicz, Harry Markowitz and William Norhaus.

The Cowles Foundation is located at 30 Hillhouse Avenue, New Haven, Connecticut.
