= Alfred Cowles Sr. =

American newspaper publisher (1832–1889)

Alfred Cowles
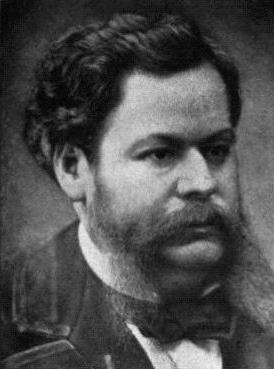
- Born: May 13, 1832; Mantua, Ohio
- Died: December 20, 1889 (aged 57); Chicago, Illinois
- Occupation: Businessperson
- Known for: Chicago Tribune
- Spouse: Sarah Frances Hutchinson
- Children: Four, including Alfred Jr.

Alfred Cowles Sr. (1832–1889) was an American businessperson and newspaper publisher. During the 1860s to 1880s he was a bookkeeper, treasurer, and business manager of the Chicago Tribune of which he was part owner.

== Biography ==
Alfred Cowles was born in Mantua, Ohio, on May 13, 1832. His parents were Edwin Weed and Almira Mills Cowles. Another son, Edwin Jr. (1825–1890), became publisher of The Cleveland Leader newspaper. Edwin married Elizabeth Hutchinson and had two sons: Alfred Hutchinson Cowles and Eugene Hutchinson Cowles (1855–1892).

Alfred Cowles married Sarah Frances Hutchinson, born in 1837 in Cayuga, New York. She was the daughter of Moseley and Elizabeth Hutchinson. They had four children: Edwin (1861–1861), Alfred Jr. (1865–1939), Sarah Frances (1862–1920), and William Hutchinson (1866–1947). William married Harriet Bowen Cheney, and became a newspaper publisher in Spokane, Washington. William is also the grandfather of William H. Cowles III.

Vassar College has a scholarship named for Sarah Frances Hutchinson Cowles, and the University of Chicago may still have a fellowship named for her.

Cowles died in Chicago on December 20, 1889. He is interred at Oak Woods Cemetery.

== See also ==
- Cowles Publishing Company
