= Channel 21 digital TV stations in the United States =

The following television stations broadcast on digital channel 21 in the United States:

- K21AC-D in Victorville, etc., California, on virtual channel 21
- K21AM-D in Ninilchick, etc., Alaska
- K21BG-D in Jacksonville, Oregon
- K21CA-D in Plains, Montana
- K21CC-D in Lewiston, Idaho
- K21DE-D in Seaside-Astoria, Oregon, on virtual channel 12, which rebroadcasts KPTV
- K21DG-D in St. James, Minnesota
- K21DO-D in Palm Springs, California
- K21EF-D in Pitkin, Colorado, on virtual channel 2
- K21EG-D in Golden Valley, Arizona
- K21EI-D in Beryl/Modena, etc., Utah
- K21EZ-D in Price, Utah
- K21FD-D in Taos, etc., New Mexico
- K21FF-D in Holyoke, Colorado, on virtual channel 7, which rebroadcasts KMGH-TV
- K21FO-D in Winnemucca, Nevada
- K21FS-D in Eugene, Oregon
- K21FT-D in Myton, Utah
- K21FU-D in Topock, Arizona
- K21GE-D in Camp Verde, Arizona
- K21GI-D in Morongo Valley, California, on virtual channel 21
- K21GJ-D in Eureka, Nevada
- K21GN-D in Alexandria, Minnesota, on virtual channel 21
- K21GQ-D in Minot, North Dakota
- K21GT-D in Dove Creek, etc., Colorado, on virtual channel 21
- K21GU-D in Midland, Texas
- K21HH-D in Preston, Idaho, on virtual channel 14, which rebroadcasts KJZZ-TV
- K21HQ-D in Glendo, Wyoming
- K21HV-D in Malad, Idaho
- K21HX-D in Walker, Minnesota, on virtual channel 21, which rebroadcasts WFTC
- K21IA-D in Waipake, Hawaii
- K21IB-D in Circleville, Utah
- K21IC-D in Mount Pleasant, Utah, on virtual channel 5, which rebroadcasts KSL-TV
- K21IL-D in Apple Valley, Utah
- K21IM-D in Fort Sumner, New Mexico
- K21IN-D in Ridgecrest, etc., California, on virtual channel 9, which rebroadcasts KCAL-TV
- K21IR-D in Childress, Texas
- K21IT-D in Weatherford, Oklahoma
- K21IU-D in Navajo Mtn. Sch., etc., Utah
- K21IV-D in Oljeto, Utah
- K21IW-D in Mexican Hat, Utah
- K21IX-D in Montezuma Creek/Aneth, Utah
- K21JC-D in Pocatello, Idaho
- K21JI-D in Cave Junction, etc., Oregon
- K21JK-D in Montrose, Colorado
- K21JN-D in Erick, Oklahoma
- K21JQ-D in Walla Walla, Washington
- K21JS-D in Harrison, Arkansas
- K21JU-D in Meeteetse, Wyoming
- K21JV-D in Green River, Utah
- K21JX-D in Huntington, Utah
- K21JZ-D in Nephi, Utah, on virtual channel 4, which rebroadcasts KTVX
- K21KA-D in Ferndale, Montana
- K21KB-D in Brookings, Oregon
- K21KC-D in Bluff, etc., Utah
- K21KE-D in Canyonville, Oregon
- K21KF-D in Frost, Minnesota
- K21KI-D in Hatch, Utah
- K21KL-D in Rural Beaver County, Utah
- K21KY-D in Bigfork/Marcell, Minnesota
- K21LB-D in Lincoln City, Oregon
- K21LC-D in Cortez, Colorado
- K21LD-D in Mazama, Washington
- K21LI-D in Idaho Falls, Idaho
- K21LR-D in Alamogordo, New Mexico
- K21LW-D in Gazelle, California
- K21LY-D in Mapleton, Oregon
- K21MA-D in Emigrant, Montana
- K21MB-D in Scottsburg, Oregon
- K21MH-D in Daggett, California, on virtual channel 21
- K21MO-D in Riverside, California
- K21MP-D in Lawton, Oklahoma
- K21MR-D in Soda Springs, Idaho
- K21MS-D in La Grande, Oregon
- K21MT-D in Seiling, Oklahoma
- K21MU-D in Summit County, Utah
- K21MV-D in Farmington, New Mexico
- K21MW-D in Thompson Falls, Montana
- K21MX-D in Garfield, etc., Utah
- K21MY-D in Richfield, etc., Utah, on virtual channel 14, which rebroadcasts KJZZ-TV
- K21MZ-D in Koosharem, Utah
- K21NA-D in Bicknell & Teasdale, Utah
- K21NB-D in Rural Sevier County, Utah
- K21NC-D in Henrieville, Utah
- K21ND-D in Mayfield, Utah
- K21NE-D in Panguitch, Utah
- K21NF-D in Roseau, Minnesota
- K21NG-D in Sandpoint, Idaho
- K21NH-D in Laketown, etc., Utah, on virtual channel 9, which rebroadcasts KUEN
- K21NI-D in Wendover, Utah
- K21NK-D in Cedar City, Utah, on virtual channel 30, which rebroadcasts KUCW
- K21NN-D in Scipio/Holden, Utah
- K21NO-D in Leamington, Utah
- K21NP-D in Orangeville, Utah, on virtual channel 13, which rebroadcasts KSTU
- K21NQ-D in Meadview, Arizona
- K21NS-D in Olivia, Minnesota
- K21NW-D in Tulia, Texas
- K21NZ-D in Anton, Colorado, on virtual channel 47
- K21OA-D in Holbrook, Idaho
- K21OB-D in Lake Charles, Louisiana
- K21OC-D in Corpus Christi, Texas
- K21OD-D in Many Farms, Arizona
- K21OF-D in Tucumcari, New Mexico
- K21OG-D in Bayfield, Colorado
- K21OH-D in Datil/Horse Springs, New Mexico
- K21OI-D in Mccook/Culbertson, Nebraska
- K21OJ-D in Ruth, Nevada
- K21OK-D in Lund & Preston, Nevada
- K21OM-D in Lafayette, Louisiana
- K21OO-D in South Eureka/Loleta, California
- K21OS-D in Beowawe, Nevada
- K21OT-D in Pasco-Kennewick, Washington
- K21OV-D in Redstone, Colorado
- K21OW-D in Lordsburg, New Mexico
- K21OY-D in Chico, California
- K21OZ-D in Shreveport, Louisiana
- K21PD-D in Columbia, Missouri
- K21PE-D in Tyler, Texas
- K21PI-D in Monterey, California
- K36KN-D in Eureka, Nevada
- KAID in Boise, Idaho
- KAJR-LD in Des Moines, Iowa
- KAKE in Wichita, Kansas
- KANG-LD in San Angelo, Texas, uses KEUS-LD's spectrum
- KCIB-LD in El Dorado, Arkansas
- KCNZ-CD in San Francisco, California, on virtual channel 28
- KDCK in Dodge City, Kansas
- KDEO-LD in Denver, Colorado, on virtual channel 23
- KDLT-TV in Sioux Falls, South Dakota
- KDTV-CD in Santa Rosa, California, on virtual channel 28
- KDTX-TV in Dallas, Texas, on virtual channel 58
- KEJT-CD in Salt Lake City, Utah, on virtual channel 50, which rebroadcasts KTMW
- KEUS-LD in San Angelo, Texas
- KFCT in Fort Collins, Colorado, on virtual channel 22
- KFTV-DT in Hanford, California
- KGCS-LD in Joplin, Missouri
- KGCW in Burlington, Iowa
- KGHB-CD in Pueblo, etc., Colorado
- KGRF-LD in Gila River Indian Community, Arizona, on virtual channel 29, which rebroadcasts KGRQ-LD
- KGRQ-LD in Gila River Indian Community, Arizona, on virtual channel 29
- KHBB-LD in Helena, Montana
- KHBS in Fort Smith, Arkansas
- KHTX-LD in Huntsville, Texas, to move to channel 29, on virtual channel 30
- KKRP-LD in St. George, Utah, on virtual channel 13, which rebroadcasts KSTU
- KKSU-LD in Manhattan, Kansas
- KKTM-LD in Altus, Oklahoma
- KKYK-CD in Little Rock, Arkansas
- KLEI in Wailuku, Hawaii
- KLSV-LD in Las Vegas, Nevada
- KLUJ-TV in Harlingen, Texas
- KMLF-LD in Grand Island, Nebraska
- KMTP-TV in San Francisco, California, uses KCNZ-CD's spectrum, to move to channel 32 and to use KCNS' spectrum, on virtual channel 32
- KNBN in Rapid City, South Dakota
- KOFY-TV in San Francisco, California, uses KCNZ-CD's spectrum, on virtual channel 20
- KPMR in Santa Barbara, California
- KPXG-LD in Portland, Oregon, on virtual channel 42
- KQMK-LD in Lincoln, Nebraska
- KQRM-LD in Petaluma, California, uses KCNZ-CD's spectrum, on virtual channel 18
- KRFT-LD in Springfield, Missouri
- KRVU-LD in Redding, California
- KRWB-TV in Roswell, New Mexico
- KRXI-TV in Reno, Nevada
- KSCE in El Paso, Texas
- KSPX-TV in Sacramento, California, on virtual channel 29
- KTAJ-TV in St. Joseph, Missouri, on virtual channel 16
- KTAV-LD in Los Angeles, California, on virtual channel 35
- KTBW-TV in Tacoma, Washington, on virtual channel 20
- KTVZ in Bend, Oregon
- KUGF-TV in Great Falls, Montana
- KUOT-CD in Oklahoma City, Oklahoma
- KWBA-TV in Sierra Vista, Arizona
- KXAB-LD in Abilene, Texas
- KXAN-TV in Austin, Texas
- KYNM-CD in Albuquerque, New Mexico
- KYVE in Yakima, Washington
- KZJL in Houston, Texas, on virtual channel 61
- W21AU-D in Orlando, Florida, on virtual channel 21
- W21CP-D in Gloversville, New York
- W21CX-D in Mayaguez, Puerto Rico, on virtual channel 12, which rebroadcasts WOLE-DT
- W21DS-D in Sayner/Vilas County, Wisconsin
- W21DV-D in Bryson City, North Carolina
- W21DZ-D in Romney, West Virginia
- W21EA-D in Parkersburg, West Virginia
- W21EF-D in Waupaca, Wisconsin, on virtual channel 8
- W21EK-D in Key West, Florida
- W21EL-D in Valdosta, Georgia
- W21EO-D in Orono, Maine
- WABE-TV in Atlanta, Georgia
- WAPT in Jackson, Mississippi
- WAUT-LD in Auburn, Alabama
- WBNS-TV in Columbus, Ohio, on virtual channel 10
- WBRL-CD in Baton Rouge, Louisiana
- WCLF in Clearwater, Florida, on virtual channel 22
- WDAY-TV in Fargo, North Dakota
- WDHN in Dothan, Alabama
- WDRF-LD in Augusta, Georgia
- WDYB-CD in Daytona Beach, Florida, on virtual channel 14
- WEAE-LD in Springfield, Illinois
- WEBA-TV in Allendale, South Carolina
- WEDW in Stamford, Connecticut, on virtual channel 49
- WEEV-LD in Evansville, Indiana
- WEFG-LD in Philadelphia, Pennsylvania, on virtual channel 7
- WETU-LD in Montgomery, Alabama
- WEUX in Chippewa Falls, Wisconsin
- WFUP in Vanderbilt, Michigan
- WFXQ-CD in Springfield, Massachusetts, an ATSC 3.0 station
- WFYI in Indianapolis, Indiana, on virtual channel 20
- WGPS-LD in Fort Myers, Florida
- WHLZ-LD in Harrisburg, Pennsylvania
- WHNO in New Orleans, Louisiana
- WHWV-LD in Huntington, West Virginia
- WJEB-TV in Jacksonville, Florida
- WJKT in Jackson, Tennessee
- WJPX in San Juan, Puerto Rico, on virtual channel 24
- WJYS in Hammond, Indiana, on virtual channel 62
- WKME-CD in Kissimmee, Florida, on virtual channel 31, which rebroadcasts WTMO-CD
- WKMG-LD in Ocala, Florida
- WKYT-TV in Lexington, Kentucky
- WMPT in Annapolis, Maryland, on virtual channel 22
- WNCR-LD in Tarboro, North Carolina, on virtual channel 41
- WNEP-TV in Scranton, Pennsylvania
- WPAN in Fort Walton Beach, Florida
- WPNT in Pittsburgh, Pennsylvania, an ATSC 3.0 station, on virtual channel 22
- WPXM-TV in Miami, Florida, on virtual channel 35
- WQDI-LD in Canton, Ohio, on virtual channel 20
- WRLW-CD in Salem, Indiana
- WROC-TV in Rochester, New York
- WSBK-TV in Boston, Massachusetts, on virtual channel 38
- WSEE-TV in Erie, Pennsylvania
- WSLF-LD in Port St. Lucie, Florida
- WTCV in San Juan, Puerto Rico, uses WJPX's spectrum, on virtual channel 18
- WTMH-LD in Macon, Georgia
- WTTO in Homewood, Alabama
- WUMN-LD in Minneapolis, Minnesota, on virtual channel 21
- WUNG-TV in Concord, North Carolina, on virtual channel 58
- WUXP-TV in Nashville, Tennessee, an ATSC 3.0 station, on virtual channel 30
- WVBT in Virginia Beach, Virginia
- WVDM-LD in Quincy, Illinois
- WVIA-TV in Scranton, Pennsylvania, uses WNEP-TV's spectrum
- WWCW in Lynchburg, Virginia
- WWIW-LD in Raleigh, North Carolina, on virtual channel 66
- WWJ-TV in Detroit, Michigan, on virtual channel 62
- WZME in Bridgeport, Connecticut, uses WEDW's spectrum, on virtual channel 43
- WZPX-TV in Battle Creek, Michigan
- WZVI in Charlotte Amalie, U.S. Virgin Islands

The following stations, which are no longer licensed, formerly broadcast on digital channel 21 in the United States:

- K21CD-D in Ukiah, California
- K21EA-D in Lake Havasu City, Arizona
- K21HF-D in Aspen, Colorado
- K21KD-D in Wyola, Montana
- K21LV-D in Perryton, Texas
- K21MC-D in Hobbs, New Mexico
- K21NJ-D in Three Forks, Montana
- K21NL-D in Howard, Montana
- K21NX-D in Hermiston, Washington
- K21PC-D in Geronimo, Oklahoma
- KDKW-LD in Lubbock, Texas
- KDUG-LD in Hemet, California
- KGRY-LD in Gila River Indian Community, Arizona
- KMIK-LD in Cedar Falls, Iowa
- KRPO-LD in Quartzsite, Arizona
- KWDA-LD in Dallas, Texas
- W21CL-D in Marathon, Florida
- W21DA-D in Dublin, Georgia
- W21DD-D in Naguabo, Puerto Rico
- W21EB-D in Clarksburg, West Virginia
- WDLP-CD in Pompano Beach, Florida
