= Channel 21 low-power TV stations in the United States =

The following low-power television stations broadcast on digital or analog channel 21 in the United States:

This table is sorted ascending by call sign; click on any of the arrows to change how the table is sorted.

Call sign	City	State
K21AC-D	Victorville, etc.	California
K21AM-D	Ninilchick, etc.	Alaska
K21BG-D	Jacksonville	Oregon
K21CA-D	Plains	Montana
K21CC-D	Lewiston	Idaho
K21DE-D	Seaside-Astoria	Oregon
K21DG-D	St. James	Minnesota
K21DO-D	Palm Springs	California
K21EF-D	Pitkin	Colorado
K21EG-D	Golden Valley	Arizona
K21EI-D	Beryl/Modena, etc.	Utah
K21EZ-D	Price	Utah
K21FD-D	Taos, etc.	New Mexico
K21FF-D	Holyoke	Colorado
K21FO-D	Winnemucca	Nevada
K21FS-D	Eugene	Oregon
K21FT-D	Myton	Utah
K21FU-D	Topock	Arizona
K21GE-D	Camp Verde	Arizona
K21GI-D	Morongo Valley	California
K21GJ-D	Eureka	Nevada
K21GN-D	Alexandria	Minnesota
K21GQ-D	Minot	North Dakota
K21GT-D	Dove Creek, etc.	Colorado
K21GU-D	Midland	Texas
K21HH-D	Preston	Idaho
K21HQ-D	Glendo	Wyoming
K21HV-D	Malad	Idaho
K21HX-D	Walker	Minnesota
K21IA-D	Waipake	Hawaii
K21IB-D	Circleville	Utah
K21IC-D	Mount Pleasant	Utah
K21IL-D	Apple Valley	Utah
K21IM-D	Fort Sumner	New Mexico
K21IN-D	Ridgecrest, etc.	California
K21IR-D	Childress	Texas
K21IT-D	Weatherford	Oklahoma
K21IU-D	Navajo Mtn. Sch., etc.	Utah
K21IV-D	Oljeto	Utah
K21IW-D	Mexican Hat	Utah
K21IX-D	Montezuma Creek/Aneth	Utah
K21JC-D	Pocatello	Idaho
K21JI-D	Cave Junction, etc.	Oregon
K21JK-D	Montrose	Colorado
K21JN-D	Erick	Oklahoma
K21JQ-D	Walla Walla	Washington
K21JS-D	Harrison	Arkansas
K21JU-D	Meeteetse	Wyoming
K21JV-D	Green River	Utah
K21JX-D	Huntington	Utah
K21JZ-D	Nephi	Utah
K21KA-D	Ferndale	Montana
K21KB-D	Brookings	Oregon
K21KC-D	Bluff, etc.	Utah
K21KE-D	Canyonville	Oregon
K21KF-D	Frost	Minnesota
K21KI-D	Hatch	Utah
K21KL-D	Rural Beaver County	Utah
K21KY-D	Bigfork/Marcell	Minnesota
K21LB-D	Lincoln City	Oregon
K21LC-D	Cortez	Colorado
K21LD-D	Mazama	Washington
K21LI-D	Idaho Falls	Idaho
K21LR-D	Alamogordo	New Mexico
K21LW-D	Gazelle	California
K21LY-D	Mapleton	Oregon
K21MA-D	Emigrant	Montana
K21MB-D	Scottsburg	Oregon
K21MH-D	Daggett	California
K21MO-D	Riverside	California
K21MP-D	Lawton	Oklahoma
K21MR-D	Soda Springs	Idaho
K21MS-D	La Grande	Oregon
K21MT-D	Seiling	Oklahoma
K21MU-D	Summit County	Utah
K21MV-D	Farmington	New Mexico
K21MW-D	Thompson Falls	Montana
K21MX-D	Garfield, etc.	Utah
K21MY-D	Richfield, etc.	Utah
K21MZ-D	Koosharem	Utah
K21NA-D	Bicknell & Teasdale	Utah
K21NB-D	Rural Sevier County	Utah
K21NC-D	Henrieville	Utah
K21ND-D	Mayfield	Utah
K21NE-D	Panguitch	Utah
K21NF-D	Roseau	Minnesota
K21NG-D	Sandpoint	Idaho
K21NH-D	Laketown, etc.	Utah
K21NI-D	Wendover	Utah
K21NK-D	Cedar City	Utah
K21NN-D	Scipio/Holden	Utah
K21NO-D	Leamington	Utah
K21NP-D	Orangeville	Utah
K21NQ-D	Meadview	Arizona
K21NS-D	Olivia	Minnesota
K21NW-D	Tulia	Texas
K21NZ-D	Anton	Colorado
K21OA-D	Holbrook	Idaho
K21OB-D	Lake Charles	Louisiana
K21OC-D	Corpus Christi	Texas
K21OD-D	Many Farms	Arizona
K21OF-D	Tucumcari	New Mexico
K21OG-D	Bayfield	Colorado
K21OH-D	Datil/Horse Springs	New Mexico
K21OI-D	Mccook/Culbertson	Nebraska
K21OJ-D	Ruth	Nevada
K21OK-D	Lund & Preston	Nevada
K21OM-D	Lafayette	Louisiana
K21OO-D	South Eureka/Loleta	California
K21OS-D	Beowawe	Nevada
K21OT-D	Pasco-Kennewick	Washington
K21OV-D	Redstone	Colorado
K21OW-D	Lordsburg	New Mexico
K21OY-D	Chico	California
K21OZ-D	Shreveport	Louisiana
K21PD-D	Columbia	Missouri
K21PE-D	Tyler	Texas
K21PI-D	Monterey	California
KAJR-LD	Des Moines	Iowa
KAKE	Wichita	Kansas
KANG-LD (uses KEUS-LD' spectrum	San Angelo	Texas
KCIB-LD	El Dorado	Arkansas
KCNZ-CD	San Francisco	California
KDEO-LD	Denver	Colorado
KDTV-CD	Santa Rosa	California
KEJT-CD	Salt Lake City	Utah
KEUS-LD	San Angelo	Texas
KGCS-LD	Joplin	Missouri
KGHB-CD	Pueblo, etc.	Colorado
KGRF-LD	Gila River Indian Community	Arizona
KGRQ-LD	Gila River Indian Community	Arizona
KHBB-LD	Helena	Montana
KHTX-LD (to move to channel 29)	Huntsville	Texas
KKRP-LD	St. George	Utah
KKSU-LD	Manhattan	Kansas
KKTM-LD	Altus	Oklahoma
KKYK-CD	Little Rock	Arkansas
KLSV-LD	Las Vegas	Nevada
KMLF-LD	Grand Island	Nebraska
KPXG-LD	Portland	Oregon
KQMK-LD	Lincoln	Nebraska
KQRM-LD (uses KCNZ-LD's spectrum)	Petaluma	California
KRFT-LD	Springfield	Missouri
KRVU-LD	Redding	California
KRXI-TV	Reno	Nevada
KTAV-LD	Los Angeles	California
KUOT-CD	Oklahoma City	Oklahoma
KXAB-LD	Abilene	Texas
KYNM-CD	Albuquerque	New Mexico
W21AU-D	Orlando	Florida
W21CP-D	Gloversville	New York
W21CX-D	Mayaguez	Puerto Rico
W21DS-D	Sayner/Vilas County	Wisconsin
W21DV-D	Bryson City	North Carolina
W21DZ-D	Romney	West Virginia
W21EA-D	Parkersburg	West Virginia
W21EF-D	Waupaca	Wisconsin
W21EK-D	Key West	Florida
W21EL-D	Valdosta	Georgia
W21EO-D	Orono	Maine
WAUT-LD	Auburn	Alabama
WBRL-CD	Baton Rouge	Louisiana
WDRF-LD	Augusta	Georgia
WDYB-CD	Daytona Beach	Florida
WEAE-LD	Springfield	Illinois
WEEV-LD	Evansville	Indiana
WEFG-LD	Philadelphia	Pennsylvania
WETU-LD	Montgomery	Alabama
WFXQ-CD (an ATSC 3.0 station)	Springfield	Massachusetts
WGPS-LD	Fort Myers	Florida
WHLZ-LD	Harrisburg	Pennsylvania
WHWV-LD	Huntington	West Virginia
WKME-CD	Kissimmee	Florida
WKMG-LD	Ocala	Florida
WNCR-LD	Tarboro	North Carolina
WQDI-LD	Canton	Ohio
WRLW-CD	Salem	Indiana
WSLF-LD	Port St. Lucie	Florida
WTMH-LD	Macon	Georgia
WUMN-LD	Minneapolis	Minnesota
WVDM-LD	Quincy	Illinois
WWIW-LD	Raleigh	North Carolina

The following low-power stations, which are no longer licensed, formerly broadcast on analog or digital channel 21:

- K21AF in Wrangell, Alaska
- K21AO in Bethel, Alaska
- K21AX in Farmington, New Mexico
- K21CD-D in Ukiah, California
- K21CK in Petersburg, Alaska
- K21DF in Stillwater, Oklahoma
- K21EA-D in Lake Havasu City, Arizona
- K21GC in Safford, Arizona
- K21GR in Joshua Tree, etc., California
- K21HF-D in Aspen, Colorado
- K21KD-D in Wyola, Montana
- K21KX-D in Hermiston, Washington
- K21LV-D in Perryton, Texas
- K21MC-D in Hobbs, New Mexico
- K21NJ-D in Three Forks, Montana
- K21NL-D in Howard, Montana
- K21PC-D in Geronimo, Oklahoma
- KDKW-LD in Lubbock, Texas
- KDUG-LD in Hemet, California
- KGRY-LD in Gila River Indian Community, Arizona
- KJWY-LD in Salem, Oregon
- KMIK-LD in Cedar Falls, Iowa
- KRPO-LD in Quartzsite, Arizona
- KTOV-LP in Corpus Christi, Texas
- KWDA-LD in Dallas, Texas
- KXTM-LP in San Antonio, Texas
- W21CL-D in Marathon, Florida
- W21DA-D in Dublin, Georgia
- W21DD-D in Naguabo, Puerto Rico
- W21EB-D in Clarksburg, West Virginia
- WDLP-CD in Pompano Beach, Florida
- WGBI-LP in Farmington, Maine
