= NonStop Local =

Regional television network

- Country: United States
- Motto: We're on it!
- TV stations: § Stations
- Headquarters: 1201 W. Sprague Ave. Spokane, WA 99201
- Broadcast area: Eastern Washington, Idaho Panhandle, & Montana
- Owner: Cowles Company
- Launch date: October 24, 2022; 3 years ago
- Sports Network: SWX Right Now
- Official website: www.nonstoplocal.com

NonStop Local is a regional network and branding of all Cowles Company-owned television stations throughout Eastern Washington state, the Idaho Panhandle, and Montana. The network includes four NBC stations and five ABC/Fox stations.

NonStop Local was created as part of a rebranding of all Cowles Company owned Television stations as a way to promote them as a multi-platform news source.

== Stations ==
=== Washington ===
Station	City	Main Affiliate	Branding
KHQ-TV	Spokane, Washington	NBC	NonStop Local KHQ
KNDU	Richland, Washington	NBC	NonStop Local Tri-Cities
KNDO	Yakima, Washington	NBC	NonStop Local Yakima

=== Montana ===
Station	City	Main affiliate	Branding
KULR-TV	Billings, Montana	NBC	NonStop Local Billings
KWYB	Butte, Montana–Bozeman, Montana	ABC/Fox	NonStop Local
KFBB-TV	Great Falls	ABC/Fox	NonStop Local Great Falls
KHBB-LD	Helena, Montana	ABC/Fox	NonStop Local Helena
KTMF	Missoula (MT)	ABC/Fox	NonStop Local Missoula
KTMF-LD	Kalispell	ABC/Fox	NonStop Local Kalispell

== See also ==
- The Spokesman-Review
