= KEUS =

KEUS may refer to:

- KEUS-LD, a low-power television station (channel 21, virtual 41) licensed to serve San Angelo, Texas, United States
- KANG-LD, a low-power television station (channel 21, virtual 31) licensed to serve San Angelo, Texas, which held the call sign KEUS-LP from 2001 to 2013
