= Channel 57 =

Channel 57 refers to several television stations:

== Canada ==
The following television stations operate on virtual channel 57 in Canada:

- CIMT-DT-7 in Les Escoumins, Quebec
- CITY-DT in Toronto, Ontario

== United States ==
The following television stations, which are no longer licensed, formerly broadcast on analog channel 57 in the United States:

- K57HX in Mesa, Arizona
- W57AN in Ocala, Florida

== See also ==
- Channel 57 virtual TV stations in the United States
