= 2006–07 Gonzaga Bulldogs men's basketball team =

American college basketball season

2006–07 Gonzaga Bulldogs men's basketball

WCC Regular Season Champions WCC tournament champions

NCAA tournament, Round of 64
- Conference: West Coast Conference
- Record: 23–11 (11–3 WCC)
- Head coach: Mark Few (8th season)
- Assistant coaches: Bill Grier (16th season); Leon Rice (8th season); Tommy Lloyd (6th season)
- Home arena: McCarthey Athletic Center

2006–07 West Coast Conference men's basketball standings
	Conf.				Overall
Team	W		L	PCT	W		L	PCT
Gonzaga †	11	–	3	.786	23	–	11	.676
Santa Clara	10	–	4	.714	21	–	10	.677
Saint Mary's	8	–	6	.571	17	–	15	.531
San Francisco	8	–	6	.571	13	–	18	.419
San Diego	6	–	8	.429	18	–	14	.563
Loyola Marymount	5	–	9	.357	13	–	18	.419
Portland	4	–	10	.286	9	–	23	.281
Pepperdine	4	–	10	.286	8	–	23	.258
† 2007 WCC tournament winner Rankings from AP Poll

The 2006–07 Gonzaga Bulldogs men's basketball team represented Gonzaga University in the NCAA men's Division I competition.

== Preseason ==
=== Departures ===
Name	Number	Pos.	Height	Weight	Year	Hometown	Reason for departure
J.P. Batista	13	F	6'9"	269	Senior (Redshirt)	Pernambuco, Brazil	Graduated
Erroll Knight	22	G	6'7"	211	Senior (Redshirt)	Seattle, WA	Graduated
Nathan Doudney	11	G	6'4"	208	Senior (Redshirt)	Rockwall, TX	Graduated
Colin Floyd	15	G	6'1"	201	Senior (Redshirt)	Harrington, WA	Graduated
Stephen Gentry	24	G	6'2"	175	Senior (Redshirt)	Fort Scott, KS	Graduated
Mamery Diallo	3	F	6'9"	235	Junior	Evreux, France	Signed a Pro Contract with Poitiers
Adam Morrison	3	F	6'8"	205	Junior	Spokane, WA	Entered the 2006 NBA draft
David Burgess	33	F	6'10"	270	Sophomore (Redshirt)	Irvine, CA	Transferred to Azusa Pacific

=== Incoming transfers ===
Name	Pos.	Height	Weight	Year	Hometown	Previous School	Years Remaining	Date Eligible
Abdullahi Kuso	F	6'9"	228	Junior (Redshirt)	Kaduna, Nigeria	Tallahassee CC	2	Oct. 1, 2006

=== 2007 Recruiting Class ===
College recruiting information
Name	Hometown	School	Height	Weight	Commit date
Will Foster; C	Bonney Lake, WA	White River	7 ft 4 in (2.24 m)	240 lb (110 kg)	Jul 2, 2005
Will Foster; C	Recruit ratings: Scout: Rivals:				
Matt Bouldin; G	Highlands Ranch, CO	ThunderRidge	6 ft 5 in (1.96 m)	214 lb (97 kg)	Sep 14, 2005
Matt Bouldin; G	Recruit ratings: Scout: Rivals:				
Theo Davis; F	Brampton, ON	Lutheran Christian Academy	6 ft 9 in (2.06 m)	198 lb (90 kg)	
Theo Davis; F	Recruit ratings: Scout: Rivals:				
Overall recruit ranking: Scout: NR Rivals: NR ESPN: NR
Note: In many cases, Scout, Rivals, 247Sports, On3, and ESPN may conflict in their listings of height and weight.; In these cases, the average was taken. ESPN grades are on a 100-point scale.; Sources: "2006 Gonzaga Rivals Commits". Rivals.; "2006 Gonzaga Scout Commits". Scout.; "2006 Gonzaga ESPN Commits". ESPN.; "Scout.com Team Recruiting Rankings". Scout.; "2006 Team Ranking". Rivals.; "2006–07 Gonzaga Bulldogs men's basketball team". 247Sports.

== Roster ==
2006–07 Gonzaga Bulldogs men's basketball team
Players
Coaches

Pos.	#	Name	Height	Weight	Year	Previous school	Hometown
F	32	Sean Mallon	6 ft 9 in (2.06 m)	223 lb (101 kg)	RS Sr	Ferris	Spokane, WA
G	5	Derek Raivio	6 ft 3 in (1.91 m)	177 lb (80 kg)	Sr	Mountain View	Vancouver, WA
F	31	Abdullahi Kuso	6 ft 9 in (2.06 m)	228 lb (103 kg)	RS Jr	Rimi; Rutgers; Tallahassee CC	Kaduna, Nigeria
G	22	David Pendergraft	6 ft 6 in (1.98 m)	223 lb (101 kg)	Jr	Brewster	Brewster, WA
G	22	Pierre Marie Altidor-Cespedes	6 ft 0 in (1.83 m)	182 lb (83 kg)	Jr	St. Champlain St.-Lambert	Montreal, QC
F	33	David Burgess	6 ft 10 in (2.08 m)	270 lb (122 kg)	RS So	Woodbridge; BYU	Irvine, CA
F	42	Josh Heytvelt	6 ft 11 in (2.11 m)	238 lb (108 kg)	RS So	Clarkston	Clarkston, WA
G	11	Andrew Sorenson (W)	6 ft 2 in (1.88 m)	172 lb (78 kg)	RS So	Olympia	Olympia, WA
G	22	Micah Downs	6 ft 8 in (2.03 m)	180 lb (82 kg)	So	Juanita; Kansas	Kirkland, WA
G	2	Jeremy Pargo	6 ft 2 in (1.88 m)	219 lb (99 kg)	So	Robeson	Chicago, IL
G	20	Larry Gurganious (injured) (redshirt)	6 ft 5 in (1.96 m)	199 lb (90 kg)	So	Saint Mary's	Berkeley, CA
G	13	Jordan Mast (W)	6 ft 2 in (1.88 m)	180 lb (82 kg)	RS Fr	Jesuit	Hillsboro, OR
C	45	Will Foster	7 ft 4 in (2.24 m)	240 lb (109 kg)	Fr	White River	Bonney Lake, WA
G	15	Matt Bouldin	6 ft 5 in (1.96 m)	214 lb (97 kg)	Fr	ThunderRidge	Highlands Ranch, CO
F	34	Theo Davis (injured) (redshirt)	6 ft 9 in (2.06 m)	198 lb (90 kg)	Fr	Lutheran Christian Academy	Brampton, ON

Head coach

- Mark Few

Assistant coach(es)

- Bill Grier
- Leon Rice
- Tommy Lloyd

Legend

- (C) Team captain
- (S) Suspended
- (I) Ineligible
- (W) Walk-on
- Injured
- Current redshirt

Roster

== Schedule ==
Date time, TV	Rank^{#}	Opponent^{#}	Result	Record	Site (attendance) city, state
Regular Season
11/10/2006*; 5:00 pm, KHQ-TV		Eastern Washington	W 90–75	1–0	McCarthey Athletic Center (6,000); Spokane, WA
11/14/2006*; 8:00 pm, ESPN		Rice; Preseason NIT West Region - 1st Round	W 88–50	2–0	Spokane Arena; Spokane, WA
11/15/2006*; 7:00 pm, ESPN		Baylor; Preseason NIT West Region - Title Game	W 78–69	3–0	Spokane Arena (8,303); Spokane, WA
11/19/2006*; 5:00 pm, KAYU		Texas-San Antonio	W 92–48	4–0	McCarthey Athletic Center (6,000); Spokane, WA
11/22/2006*; 6:00 pm, ESPN2		vs. No. 2 North Carolina; Preseason NIT - 1st Round	W 82–74	5–0	Madison Square Garden (9,123); New York, NY
11/24/2006*; 4:00 pm, ESPN2		vs. Butler; Preseason NIT- Championship Game	L 79–71	5–1	Madison Square Garden (9,498); New York, NY
11/26/2006*; 1:00 pm, KHQ-TV		Idaho	W 76–51	6–1	McCarthey Athletic Center (6,000); Spokane, WA
11/30/2006*; 5:00 pm, KHQ-TV	No. 22	Portland State	W 69–51	7–1	McCarthey Athletic Center (6,000); Spokane, WA
12/02/2006*; 12:00 pm, ESPN	No. 22	vs. Texas; Hall of Fame Challenge	W 87–77	8–1	U.S. Airways Center; Phoenix, AZ
12/05/2006*; 7:00 pm, KHQ-TV	No. 18	at Washington State	L 77–67	8–2	Beasley Coliseum; Pullman, WA
12/09/2006*; 8:00 pm, KHQ-TV	No. 18	No. 13 Washington	W 99–77	9–2	McCarthey Athletic Center (6,000); Spokane, WA
12/16/2006*; 2:00 pm, ESPN	No. 16	at Georgia	L 96–83	9–3	The Arena at Gwinnett Center (6,812); Duluth, GA
12/21/2006*; 6:00 pm, ESPN2	No. 22	vs. No. 6 Duke	L 61–54	9–4	Madison Square Garden (19,528); New York, NY
12/30/2006*; 3:00 pm, ESPN2		vs. No. 24 Nevada; Battle in Seattle	L 82–74	9–5	KeyArena (15,110); Seattle, WA
01/03/2007*; 6:00 pm, ESPN2		at Virginia	L 108–87	9–6	John Paul Jones Arena (13,827); Charlottesville, VA
01/06/2007; 1:00 pm, KAYU		Loyola Marymount	W 97–62	10–6 (1–0)	McCarthey Athletic Center (6,000); Spokane, WA
01/08/2007; 8:00 pm, ESPN2		Pepperdine	W 69–52	11–6 (2–0)	McCarthey Athletic Center (6,000); Spokane, WA
01/13/2007; 8:00 pm, KHQ-TV		at Santa Clara	W 77–69	12–6 (3–0)	Leavey Center (4,500); Santa Clara, CA
01/16/2007; 9:00 pm, ESPN		St. Mary's	L 80–75	12–7 (3–1)	McKeon Pavilion (3,500); Moraga, CA
01/22/2007; 8:00 pm, ESPN		at Portland	W 80–68	13–7 (4–1)	Chiles Center (4,712); Portland, OR
01/27/2007; 5:00 pm, KHQ-TV		San Francisco	W 72–56	14–7 (5–1)	McCarthey Athletic Center (6,000); Spokane, WA
01/29/2007; 4:00 pm, ESPN2		San Diego	W 91–82	15–7 (6–1)	McCarthey Athletic Center (6,000); Spokane, WA
01/31/2007*; 8:00 pm, FSN		at No. 23 Stanford	W 90–86 ^{2OT}	16–7	Maples Pavilion (7,178); Stanford, CA
02/03/2007; 12:00 pm, KHQ-TV		at Pepperdine	W 82–57	17–7 (7–1)	Firestone Fieldhouse; Malibu, CA
02/05/2007; 8:00 pm, ESPN2		at Loyola Marymount	L 67–61	17–8 (7–2)	Gersten Pavilion (3,816); Los Angeles, CA
02/10/2007; 5:00 pm, KHQ-TV		St. Mary's	W 60–49	18–8 (8–2)	McCarthey Athletic Center (6,000); Spokane, WA
02/12/2007; 8:00 pm, ESPN2		Santa Clara	L 84–73	18–9 (8–3)	McCarthey Athletic Center (6,000); Spokane, WA
02/17/2007*; 3:00 pm, ESPN		No. 8 Memphis	L 78–77	18–10	Spokane Arena (11,272); Spokane, WA
02/19/2007; 6:00 pm, KHQ-TV		Portland	W 87–67	19–10 (9–3)	McCarthey Athletic Center (6,000); Spokane, WA
02/24/2007; 12:00 pm, ABC		at San Francisco	W 86–79 ^{OT}	20–10 (10–3)	War Memorial Gymnasium (4,500); San Francisco, CA
02/26/2007; 7:00 pm, KHQ-TV		at San Diego	W 74–64	21–10 (11–3)	Jenny Craig Pavilion (5,054); San Diego, CA
2007 West Coast Conference tournament
03/04/2007; 6:00 pm, ESPN2		vs. San Diego; Semifinals	W 88–70	22–10	Chiles Center; Portland, OR
03/05/2007; 6:00 pm, ESPN		vs. Santa Clara; Championship	W 77–68	23–10	Chiles Center (4,621); Portland, OR
NCAA Division I men's basketball tournament
03/15/2007*; 6:00 pm, CBS	No. (10)	vs. (7) Indiana; NCAA Tournament Round of 64	L 70–57	23–11	Arco Arena (16,338); Sacramento, CA
*Non-conference game. ^{#}Rankings from AP Poll. (#) Tournament seedings in parentheses. All times are in Pacific Time.
