= KQBN =

KQBN may refer to:

- KQBN-LP, a defunct low-power television station (channel 41) formerly licensed to serve Midland, Texas, United States
- KQBN-LP (defunct), a defunct low-power television station (channel 28) formerly licensed to serve Prescott, Arizona, United States
