= KWYB =

Television station in Butte, Montana

KWYB and KWYB-LD

KWYB: Butte, Montana; KWYB-LD: Bozeman, Montana; United States
- Channels for KWYB: Digital: 19 (UHF); Virtual: 18
- Channels for KWYB-LD: Digital: 28 (UHF); Virtual: 28
- Branding: ABC Montana; NonStop Local (newscasts)

Programming
- Affiliations: 18.1/28.1: ABC; 18.2/28.2: Fox/MyNetworkTV; 18.3/28.3: SWX Right Now

Ownership
- Owner: Cowles Company; (Cowles Montana Media Company)
- Sister stations: KULR-TV, KFBB-TV, KTMF

History
- First air date: KWYB: September 27, 1996; KWYB-LD: October 1996
- Former call signs: KWYB-LD: K28FB (1996–1997)
- Former channel number: KWYB: Analog: 18 (UHF, 1996–2009); KWYB-LD: Analog: 28 (UHF, 1996–2009)

Technical information
- Licensing authority: FCC
- Facility ID: KWYB: 14674; KWYB-LD: 38576
- Class: KWYB-LD: LD
- ERP: KWYB: 110.7 kW; KWYB-LD: 6.5 kW
- HAAT: KWYB: 585.2 m (1,920 ft); KWYB-LD: 204.6 m (671 ft)
- Transmitter coordinates: KWYB: 46°0′23.7″N 112°26′33″W; KWYB-LD: 45°38′19.9″N 111°15′58.4″W
- Translators: K26ON-D 26 Deer Lodge, etc.

Links
- Public license information: KWYB: Public file; LMS; KWYB-LD: Public file; LMS
- Website: www.nonstoplocal.com/butte-bozeman/

KWYB (channel 18) in Butte, Montana, and KWYB-LD (channel 28) in Bozeman, Montana, are television stations serving as the ABC and Fox affiliates for Southwestern Montana. Owned by the Cowles Company, KWYB maintains studios on Dewey Boulevard in Butte, and its transmitter is located on XL Heights east of the city.

KWYB-LD operates as a low-power semi-satellite of KWYB. It simulcasts all network and syndicated programming provided by KWYB, but airs separate commercial inserts and legal identifications. KWYB-LD's transmitter is located southwest of Four Corners, Montana.

== History ==
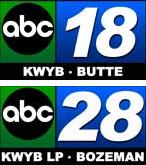
KWYB's "ABC 18" and "ABC 28" logos, used during the mid-2000s

Channel 18 was allotted to Butte in 1983. A construction permit for a station to be owned by Community Christian Television was issued in 1986, but failed to materialize.

In 1991, Continental Television Network applied for channel 18 in Butte and was granted a construction permit by the Federal Communications Commission on January 9, 1992. The launch of KWYB was delayed two years by transmitter site arrangements. To house its XL Heights transmitter, it reached a deal with local electric utility Montana Power Company to move into space formerly utilized by the company. However, Montana Power wound up moving out in 1996 instead of the previously planned 1994. This pushed back construction of the physical plant. Station studios offices were set up in a building on West Park Street.

KWYB went on the air September 27, 1996. It assumed the ABC affiliation from two low-power stations operated by KXLF-TV/KCTZ, known as "KBZ", in the Butte and Bozeman areas. When it launched, the station also assumed a secondary affiliation with Fox for NFL football. A month later, K28FB—today's KWYB-LD—began broadcasting to Bozeman.

In February 2001, CTN sold KWYB/KWYB-LP, along with KTMF in Missoula, KTMF-LP in Kalispell, and KTGF in Great Falls, to Max Media of Montana. They were the first television station acquisitions in Montana for Max Media.

Max Media provided operational support to the Equity Broadcasting-owned Fox affiliates in Butte/Bozeman, Missoula, and Great Falls from 2003 to 2008. This arrangement ended in 2008, when Equity assumed programming responsibilities directly. In 2009, after a bankrupt Equity was forced to shut down the stations (including KBTZ channel 24 in Butte and KBTZ-LP channel 32 in Bozeman) because it could not convert them to digital television, the Fox affiliation migrated to digital subchannels of KWYB/KWYB-LD, KTMF/KTMF-LD, and KFBB-TV.

On September 30, 2013, the Cowles Company acquired Max Media's Montana television stations for $18 million. The sale was completed on November 29.

== News operation ==
KWYB's first local news service came under Max Media ownership in September 2002, when Max contracted Independent News Network of Davenport, Iowa, to produce a regional newscast for KWYB, KTMF, and KTGF, all third-to-air stations in their markets with no local news at the time. Six reporters, one each in the five areas serviced by the Max Montana stations and another in Helena, contributed reports to Big Sky News at 5 and 10 p.m., which was presented from Iowa. The early newscast was dropped at the start of 2004.

In 2005, Max Media acquired KFBB-TV in Great Falls, selling KTGF. Unlike KTGF, KFBB-TV produced its own local news. At that time, Big Sky News was replaced with a 10 p.m. newscast branded Montana News Network, produced from Great Falls and servicing all of the company's Montana stations except KULR-TV in Billings. This newscast was subsequently discontinued, and for several years the only local newscast on the station was a ten-minute late newscast, 10@10.

As of September 2015, KWYB airs the state-wide morning newscast Wake Up Montana (produced by KHQ-TV in Spokane, Washington) and full early evening and late newscasts, as well as a prime time newscast on its Fox subchannel.

In October 2022, the station rebranded its news output as NonStop Local, as part of a rebranding by Cowles.

== Technical information ==
=== Subchannels ===
The stations' signals are multiplexed:

Subchannels of KWYB and KWYB-LD
Channel		Res.	Short name		Programming
KWYB	KWYB-LD	Res.	KWYB	KWYB-LD	Programming
18.1	28.1	720p	KWYBABC	KWYBLAB	ABC
18.2	28.2	720p	KWYBFOX	KWYBLFO	Fox
18.3	28.3	480i	SWX		SWX Right Now

On June 14, 2002, the FCC granted a construction permit to build KWYB-DT on UHF channel 19. The station received special temporary authority (STA) on April 22, 2003, to broadcast at reduced power. In Butte, KWYB's analog signal went off the air on the original shutoff date on February 17, 2009.

On August 11, 2006, the FCC granted "flash-cut" authorization to KWYB-LD, and on August 11, 2009, analog station KWYB-LP converted to digital station KWYB-LD on channel 28.
