= KNDO =

Television station in Yakima, Washington

KNDO and KNDU

KNDO: Yakima, Washington; KNDU: Richland–Pasco–Kennewick, Washington; United States
- Channels for KNDO: Digital: 16 (UHF); Virtual: 23
- Channels for KNDU: Digital: 26 (UHF); Virtual: 25
- Branding: KNDO: NonStop Local Yakima; KNDU: NonStop Local Tri-Cities

Programming
- Affiliations: 23.1/25.1: NBC; 23.3/25.3: SWX Right Now

Ownership
- Owner: Cowles Company; (KHQ, Incorporated)

History
- First air date: KNDO: October 15, 1959; KNDU: August 10, 1961
- Former channel number: KNDO: Analog: 23 (UHF, 1959–2009); KNDU: Analog: 25 (UHF, 1961–2009)
- Former affiliations: KNDO: ABC (primary 1959–1965, secondary 1965–1970); CBS (secondary, 1959–1965); KNDU: ABC (primary 1961–1965, secondary 1965–1970)
- Call sign meaning: KNDO: Sounds like "Can-Do"; KNDU: Disambiguation of KNDO

Technical information
- Licensing authority: FCC
- Facility ID: KNDO: 12395; KNDU: 12427
- ERP: KNDO: 150 kW; KNDU: 150 kW
- HAAT: KNDO: 266 m (873 ft); KNDU: 402 m (1,319 ft)
- Transmitter coordinates: KNDO: 46°31′58″N 120°30′30″W; KNDU: 46°6′11″N 119°7′53″W

Links
- Public license information: KNDO: Public file; LMS; KNDU: Public file; LMS
- Website: www.nonstoplocal.com/tri-cities-yakima/

KNDO (channel 23) in Yakima, Washington, and KNDU (channel 25) in Richland, Washington, are television stations serving as the NBC network affiliates for Central Washington and Northeastern Oregon. They are owned by the Spokane-based Cowles Company as part of the KHQ Television Group. KNDO's studios are located on West Yakima Avenue in downtown Yakima, and its transmitter is atop Ahtanum Ridge; KNDU maintains its own studios on West Kennewick Avenue in Kennewick, with transmitter on Jump Off Joe Butte.

KNDU operates as a semi-satellite of KNDO, serving the Tri-Cities area. It simulcasts all network and syndicated programming as provided through its parent, and the two stations share a website. However, KNDU airs separate commercial inserts and legal identifications. Local newscasts, produced by KNDU, are simulcast on both stations. KNDO serves the western half of the Yakima–Tri-Cities market while KNDU serves the eastern portion. The two stations are counted as a single unit for ratings purposes. Master control and some internal operations are based at the studios of sister station, fellow NBC affiliate and company flagship KHQ-TV on West Sprague Avenue in downtown Spokane.

On satellite, KNDO is carried on DirecTV, while KNDU is carried on Dish Network.

== History ==
KNDO debuted on the air on October 15, 1959. It was owned by Hugh Davis and his Columbia Empire Broadcasting Corporation. Previously, all three networks had been shoehorned on primary CBS affiliate KIMA-TV (channel 29). Although conventional wisdom suggested that KNDO should have signed on as an NBC affiliate, it instead took on the ABC affiliation. This was very unusual for a two-station market, especially one as small as Yakima. During this time, it carried a secondary affiliation with NBC, and also aired a few CBS programs turned down by KIMA-TV, including The Andy Griffith Show.

On August 16, 1960, CEBC filed to build a new TV station on channel 25 in Richland. The company was composed of employees of KNDO and KTNT-TV in Tacoma and had also filed to buy KNDO. The Federal Communications Commission (FCC) granted the permit on May 24, 1961, and the station was announced to be a satellite of KNDO. Programming began August 10, 1961. A major increase in power was made in 1966.

In 1965, KNDO and KNDU became primary NBC affiliates, but shared ABC with KIMA-TV until KAPP (channel 35) and KVEW (channel 42) debuted in 1970 to take the ABC affiliation; since then, KNDO and KNDU have been exclusive NBC affiliates.

Davis sold the two stations to Farragut Communications in 1988. Federal Enterprises acquired KNDO and KNDU in 1995. Federal was bought out by Raycom Media in 1997. Cowles Company purchased the two stations from Raycom in July 1999.

On October 15, 2009, KNDO celebrated 50 years of broadcasting to the Yakima Valley. Leading up to that date, KNDO aired stories of local businesses and organizations that have also been around for 50 years or longer.

== Programming ==
In the past, KNDO and KNDU preempted much of the NBC lineup post-Late Night, including Later and Friday Night Videos/Friday Night, along with the network's Nightside rolling news block, as the stations carried syndicated programming, then continued to sign off the air nightly. It began to air all three programs in 1996, shortly after Federal took control of the stations.

== Notable former on-air staff ==
- Jamie Kern
- Whit Johnson
- Anish Shroff
- Jim Snyder (1987–1989)

== Subchannels ==
The stations' signals are multiplexed:

Subchannels of KNDO and KNDU
Channel		Res.	Short name		Programming
KNDO	KNDU	Res.	KNDO	KNDU	Programming
23.1	25.1	1080i	KNDO-HD	KNDU-HD	NBC
23.3	25.3	1080i	SWxKNDO	SWxKNDU	SWX Right Now

KNDO and KNDU have been digital-only since February 17, 2009. NBC Weather Plus had been carried on digital subchannel 23.3 and 25.3; the originating national network ceased operation on December 1, 2008.

On September 1, 2010, KNDO and KNDU discontinued broadcasting Universal Sports on digital subchannels 23.2 and 25.2. Its bandwidth was reallocated to SWX Right Now (23.3/25.3) to improve the picture quality of SWX programming.

== Translator ==
- K32IG-D Ellensburg (translates KNDO)
