= Channel 57 virtual TV stations in the United States =

The following television stations operate on virtual channel 57 in the United States:

- K09DM-D in Cortez, Colorado
- K21KB-D in Brookings, Oregon
- KAZH-LD in McAllen, Texas
- KFUL-LD in San Luis Obispo, California
- KJLA in Ventura, California
- KUBE-TV in Baytown, Texas
- KWOG in Springdale, Arkansas
- KXTU-LD in Colorado Springs, Colorado
- W25AT-D in Tupper Lake, New York
- W25BT-D in Monkton, Vermont
- WACH in Columbia, South Carolina
- WATC-DT in Atlanta, Georgia
- WBND-LD in South Bend, Indiana
- WCFE-TV in Plattsburgh, New York
- WCVW in Richmond, Virginia
- WDCI-LD in Chicago, Illinois
- WFXU in Live Oak, Florida
- WGBY-TV in Springfield, Massachusetts
- WIFS in Janesville, Wisconsin
- WMLD-LD in Brownsville, Florida
- WPSG in Philadelphia, Pennsylvania
- WYMT-TV in Hazard, Kentucky

The following stations, which are no longer licensed, formerly operated on virtual channel 57:

- W46IT-D in Port Henry, New York
