= Whit Johnson =

American journalist (born 1982)

- Born: Stephen Whitney Johnson; June 25, 1982 (age 44); San Francisco, California, U.S.
- Education: San Francisco State University (B.A.)
- Occupation: Journalist
- Television: KSL-TV; KNDO; KNDU; CBS News (2009–2012); KNBC (2012–2017); ABC News (2018–present)
- Spouse: Andrea Fujii (m. 2007)
- Children: 2

Stephen Whitney "Whit" Johnson (born June 25, 1982) is an American journalist known as the co-anchor of the weekend editions of Good Morning America, the anchor of the Saturday edition of ABC World News Tonight, and the fill-in and substitute anchor of Good Morning America, and ABC World News Tonight.

== Early life ==
Johnson was born and raised in San Francisco. He graduated from San Francisco State University with a B.A. degree in Television and Radio Broadcasting. Johnson credits his stepfather, TV and radio host Dean Edell, with having introduced him to the world of broadcasting.

== Career ==
Johnson began his on-air career in 2005 with NBC affiliate KNDO/KNDU-TV in Yakima/Tri-Cities, Washington, as a reporter and evening weekend anchor. He next worked for Salt Lake City, Utah, NBC affiliate KSL-TV as a reporter and as an anchor on evening weekdays.

Johnson joined CBS News as a Washington, D.C.–based network correspondent and fill-in anchor in 2009. While there, much of his coverage focused on the White House, on Capitol Hill and foreign policy issues. He reported on the death of Osama bin Laden and interviewed then-Secretary of State Hillary Clinton over the course of her tour of the Middle East in 2011.

In 2012, Johnson joined KNBC in Los Angeles as an anchor and general-assignment reporter. In that role, he reported from Boston for Mitt Romney's 2012 presidential run, covered the Asiana flight 214 crash landing at San Francisco International Airport, and reported on the Washington D.C. Navy Yard mass shootings. In June 2014, he joined Today in L.A., as co-anchor alongside Daniella Guzman. He traveled to Sochi to cover the 2014 Winter Olympics and later to Rio de Janeiro for the 2016 Summer Olympics. In Rio, he co-hosted a special report on the Opening Ceremony that won a Los Angeles Emmy.

ABC News announced Johnson had joined as a correspondent in March 2018. In September of that same year, Johnson took over as a co-anchor of the weekend editions of Good Morning America.

Johnson served as a lead correspondent for ABC News throughout the COVID-19 pandemic. During the 2020 election cycle he covered election week from Arizona as well as the Democratic primaries. On February 1, 2021, ABC announced that Johnson would become Saturday anchor of ABC World News Tonight, replacing the departing Tom Llamas, but that he would also continue to co-anchor Good Morning America on the weekends.

== Personal life ==
Johnson lives in the New York area with his wife (married on August 11, 2007), Andrea Fujii, an ABC News reporter, and their two daughters.

In 2018, Johnson unwittingly found two of his father's brothers through a 23andMe DNA test.
