= 2007 West Coast Conference men's basketball tournament =

- Classification: Division I
- Season: 2006–07
- Teams: 8
- Site: Chiles Center; Portland, Oregon
- Champions: Gonzaga (9th title)
- Winning coach: Mark Few (7th title)
- MVP: Derek Raivio (Gonzaga)
- Television: ESPN2, ESPN

2006–07 West Coast Conference men's basketball standings
	Conf.				Overall
Team	W		L	PCT	W		L	PCT
Gonzaga †	11	–	3	.786	23	–	11	.676
Santa Clara	10	–	4	.714	21	–	10	.677
Saint Mary's	8	–	6	.571	17	–	15	.531
San Francisco	8	–	6	.571	13	–	18	.419
San Diego	6	–	8	.429	18	–	14	.563
Loyola Marymount	5	–	9	.357	13	–	18	.419
Portland	4	–	10	.286	9	–	23	.281
Pepperdine	4	–	10	.286	8	–	23	.258
† 2007 WCC tournament winner Rankings from AP Poll

The 2007 West Coast Conference men's basketball tournament took place March 2–5, 2007 at the Chiles Center on the campus of the University of Portland in Portland, Oregon. The semifinals were televised by ESPN2, and the championship game was televised by ESPN.

The top seed, Gonzaga, won the tournament for the fourth straight season, and advanced to the NCAA tournament for the 9th straight time.

== Bracket ==
First round Friday, March 2
5	San Diego	95
8	Pepperdine	82
6	Loyola Marymount	41
7	Portland	55

Quarter finals Saturday, March 3
4	San Francisco	75
5	San Diego	77
3	Saint Mary's	87
7	Portland	47

Semi-finals; Sunday, March 4
1	Gonzaga	88
5	San Diego	70
2	Santa Clara	63
3	St. Mary's	47

Finals; Monday, March 5
1	Gonzaga	77
2	Santa Clara	68

n:2007 WCC tournament
