= Christine Clayburg =

American television meteorologist

Christine Clayburg (born May 26, 1973, in Paso Robles, California) is an American television meteorologist who also has done some acting, directing and screenwriting.

Beginning as a Geology major at Sacramento State University, she became known as the morning meteorologist on the Minneapolis television station WCCO-TV. She has worked as a meteorologist and science reporter for KABC-TV in Los Angeles, WHDH-TV in Boston, KHQ-TV in Spokane, KPAX-TV in Missoula and KMSP-TV (also in Minneapolis). She has appeared nationally for Fox News and The Weather Channel. In 2003, she was nominated for an Emmy Award in the Best Weather Anchor category.

As an actor, she has appeared in top rated television shows and independent films. She played the lead role in the 2005 short film Minneapolis which she also co-wrote.

From 2006 to 2012, she had a recurring role as a news reporter on Desperate Housewives. She has appeared in other roles for The Mindy Project, 90210, The Closer, Hallmark and Lifetime, always as a newscaster.

Christine also flies with the Minnesota Air National Guard as a loadmaster on the C-130 Hercules and has deployed to Afghanistan and Kuwait in support of Operation Enduring Freedom.
