= West Shore State Park =

Park in Montana, US

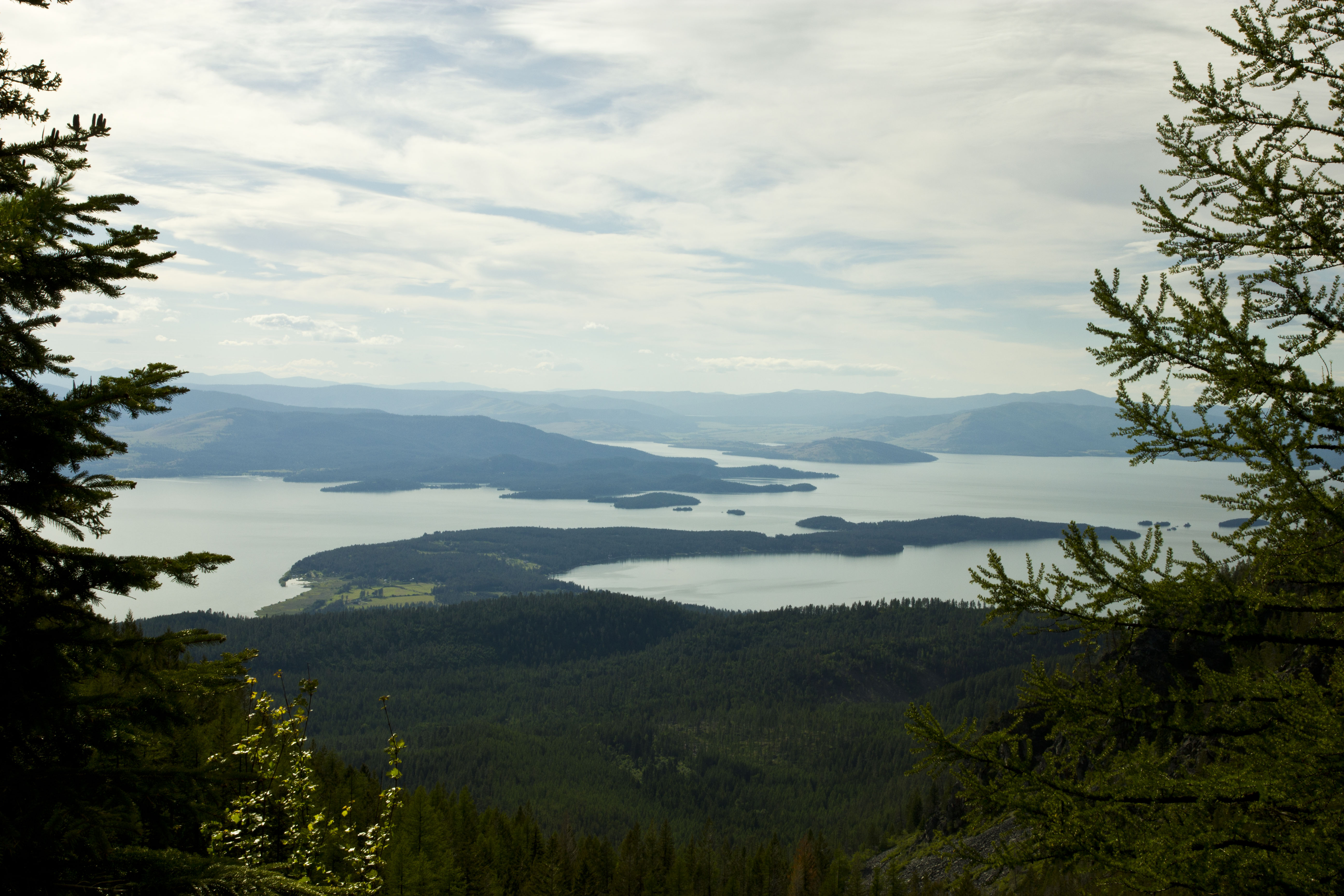
- View of Flathead Lake: West Shore State Park out of range at extreme distant right

- Location within Montana
- Location: Lake County, Montana, United States
- Nearest town: Lakeside, Montana
- Coordinates: 47°58′44″N 114°11′18″W
- Area: 129 acres (52 ha)
- Elevation: 3,022 ft (921 m)
- Designation: Montana state park
- Established: 1955
- Administrator: Montana Fish, Wildlife & Parks
- Website: West Shore State Park

West Shore State Park is a public recreation area occupying 129 acres on the western shore of Flathead Lake five miles south of Lakeside in Lake County, Montana. The state park offers boating, fishing, camping, swimming, hiking, and wildlife viewing.
