= Maricopa Village, Arizona =

- Populated place
- Location within the state of Arizona Maricopa Village (the United States)
- Coordinates: 33°22′17″N 112°14′16″W
- Country: United States
- State: Arizona
- County: Maricopa
- Elevation: 978 ft (298 m)
- Time zone: UTC-7 (Mountain (MST))
  - Summer (DST): UTC-7 (MST)
- Area code: 520
- FIPS code: 04-44550
- GNIS feature ID: 7702

Maricopa Village is a populated place situated in Maricopa County, Arizona, United States, in the federally recognized Gila River Indian Community. It has an estimated elevation of 978 feet (298 m) above sea level.
