= Lakeside, Montana =

Unincorporated community in Montana, United States

- Census-designated place
- Location of Lakeside, Montana
- Coordinates: 48°01′05″N 114°13′40″W
- Country: United States
- State: Montana
- County: Flathead

Area
  - Total: 17.96 sq mi (46.52 km^{2})
  - Land: 14.08 sq mi (36.47 km^{2})
  - Water: 3.88 sq mi (10.04 km^{2})
- Elevation: 2,923 ft (891 m)

Population (2020)
  - Total: 2,705
  - Density: 192.1/sq mi (74.17/km^{2})
- Time zone: UTC-7 (Mountain (MST))
  - Summer (DST): UTC-6 (MDT)
- ZIP code: 59922
- Area code: 406
- FIPS code: 30-41950
- GNIS feature ID: 2408563

Lakeside is an unincorporated area and census-designated place (CDP) in Flathead County, Montana, United States. The population was 2,705 at the 2020 census, up from 2,669 in 2010.

In 1892 the town was called Stoner, named after John J. Stoner, proprietor of a hotel near the shores of Flathead Lake. A community named Lakeside already existed in Roosevelt County. With its demise in 1920, this town changed its name.

West Shore State Park is 5 miles south of town.

== Geography ==
Lakeside is located in southern Flathead County. It is on the western shore of the north end of Flathead Lake. It is bordered to the north by Somers, and it extends south as far as the Lake County line.

U.S. Route 93 passes through Lakeside, leading north 14 miles (23 km) to Kalispell and south 37 miles (60 km) to Polson at the south end of Flathead Lake.

According to the United States Census Bureau, the Lakeside CDP has a total area of 18.0 square miles (46.5 km^{2}), of which 14.1 square miles (36.4 km^{2}) is land and 3.9 square miles (10.1 km^{2}), or 21.69%, is water.

== Demographics ==
Historical population
Census	Pop.	Note	%±
2000	1,679		—
2010	2,669		59.0%
2020	2,705		1.3%
U.S. Decennial Census

=== 2020 census ===
As of the 2020 census, Lakeside had a population of 2,705. The median age was 49.7 years. 20.0% of residents were under the age of 18 and 27.6% of residents were 65 years of age or older. For every 100 females there were 99.2 males, and for every 100 females age 18 and over there were 95.8 males age 18 and over.

0.0% of residents lived in urban areas, while 100.0% lived in rural areas.

There were 1,096 households in Lakeside, of which 22.5% had children under the age of 18 living in them. Of all households, 56.7% were married-couple households, 16.1% were households with a male householder and no spouse or partner present, and 21.4% were households with a female householder and no spouse or partner present. About 23.4% of all households were made up of individuals and 12.5% had someone living alone who was 65 years of age or older.

There were 1,431 housing units, of which 23.4% were vacant. The homeowner vacancy rate was 1.4% and the rental vacancy rate was 6.4%.

Racial composition as of the 2020 census
Race	Number	Percent
White	2,511	92.8%
Black or African American	0	0.0%
American Indian and Alaska Native	18	0.7%
Asian	17	0.6%
Native Hawaiian and Other Pacific Islander	1	0.0%
Some other race	26	1.0%
Two or more races	132	4.9%
Hispanic or Latino (of any race)	77	2.8%

=== 2000 census ===
As of the census of 2000, there were 1,679 people, 705 households, and 520 families residing in the CDP. The population density was 228.9 inhabitants per square mile (88.4/km^{2}). There were 956 housing units at an average density of 130.3 per square mile (50.3/km^{2}). The racial makeup of the CDP was 97.92% White, 0.06% African American, 0.71% Native American, 0.42% Asian, 0.30% from other races, and 0.60% from two or more races. Hispanic or Latino of any race were 1.07% of the population. 15.6% were of English, 15.3% German, 14.8% Norwegian, 8.2% United States or American, 7.3% Irish and 5.5% Italian ancestry according to Census 2000.

There were 705 households, out of which 26.0% had children under the age of 18 living with them, 67.7% were married couples living together, 3.8% had a female householder with no husband present, and 26.2% were non-families. 22.7% of all households were made up of individuals, and 9.6% had someone living alone who was 65 years of age or older. The average household size was 2.38 and the average family size was 2.78.

In the CDP, the population was spread out, with 23.0% under the age of 18, 3.8% from 18 to 24, 24.2% from 25 to 44, 30.3% from 45 to 64, and 18.7% who were 65 years of age or older. The median age was 44 years. For every 100 females, there were 96.6 males. For every 100 females age 18 and over, there were 91.7 males.

The median income for a household in the CDP was $36,048, and the median income for a family was $43,839. Males had a median income of $30,819 versus $21,591 for females. The per capita income for the CDP was $18,533. About 13.6% of families and 17.3% of the population were below the poverty line, including 27.5% of those under age 18 and 9.6% of those age 65 or over.

== Media ==
The FM radio station KOLK is licensed in Lakeside. It plays a country music format.

== Gallery ==
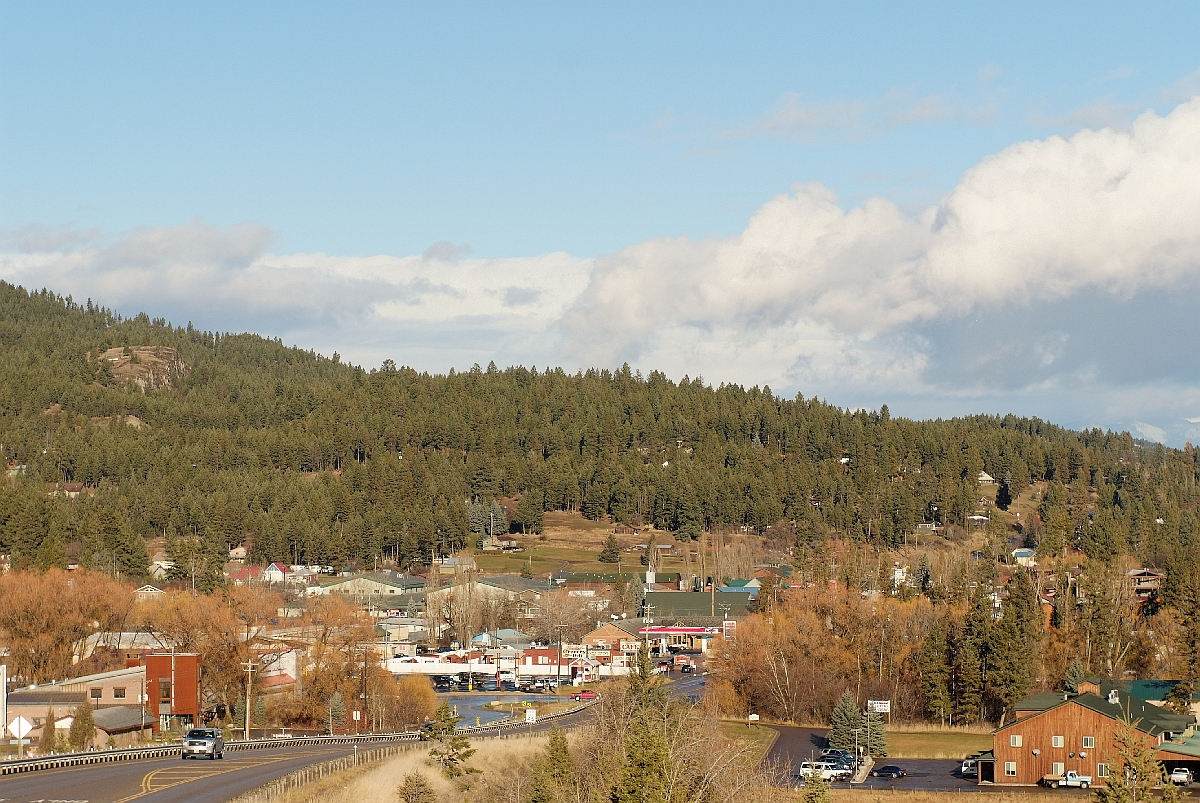
Lakeside seen from the south

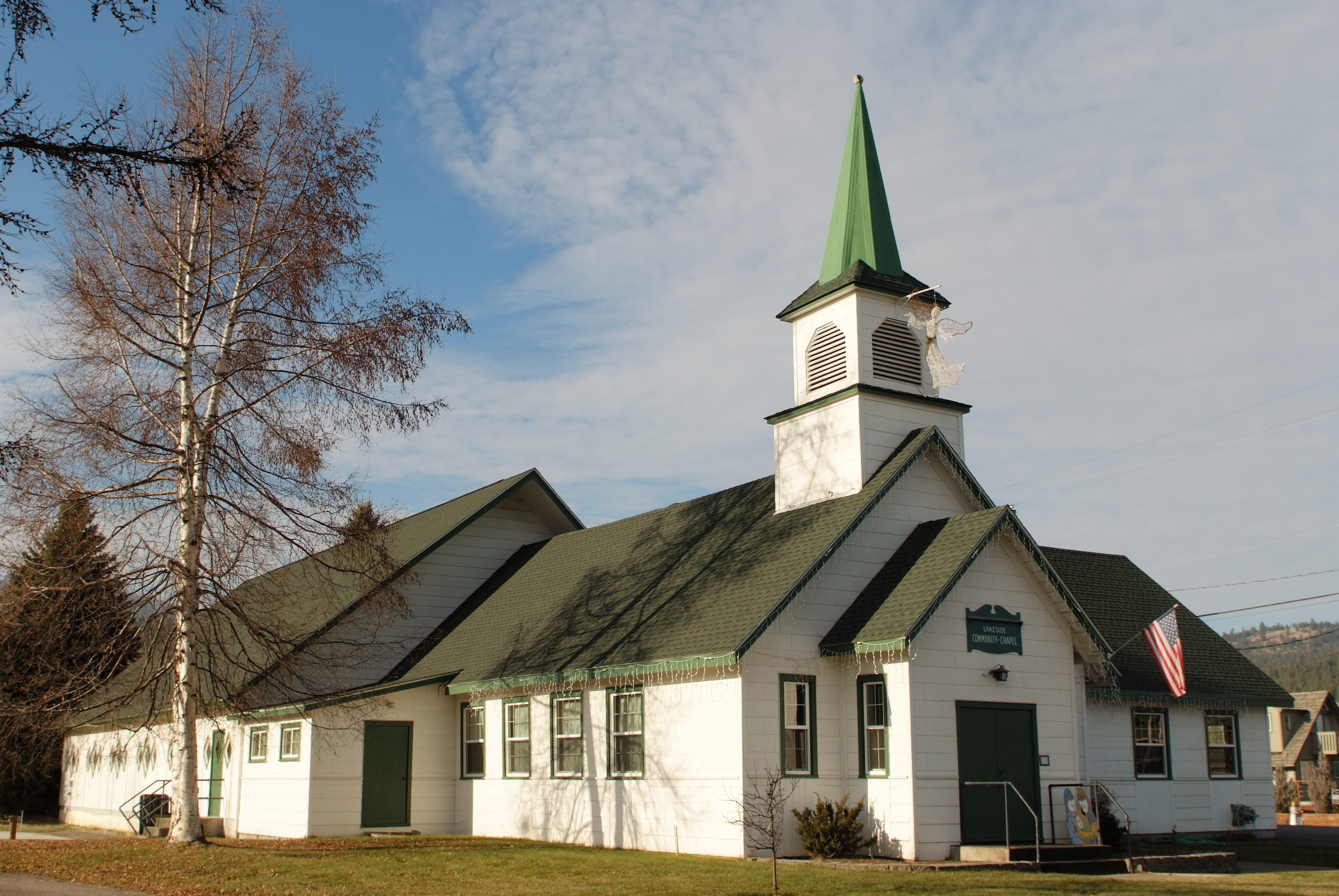
Lakeside Community Chapel

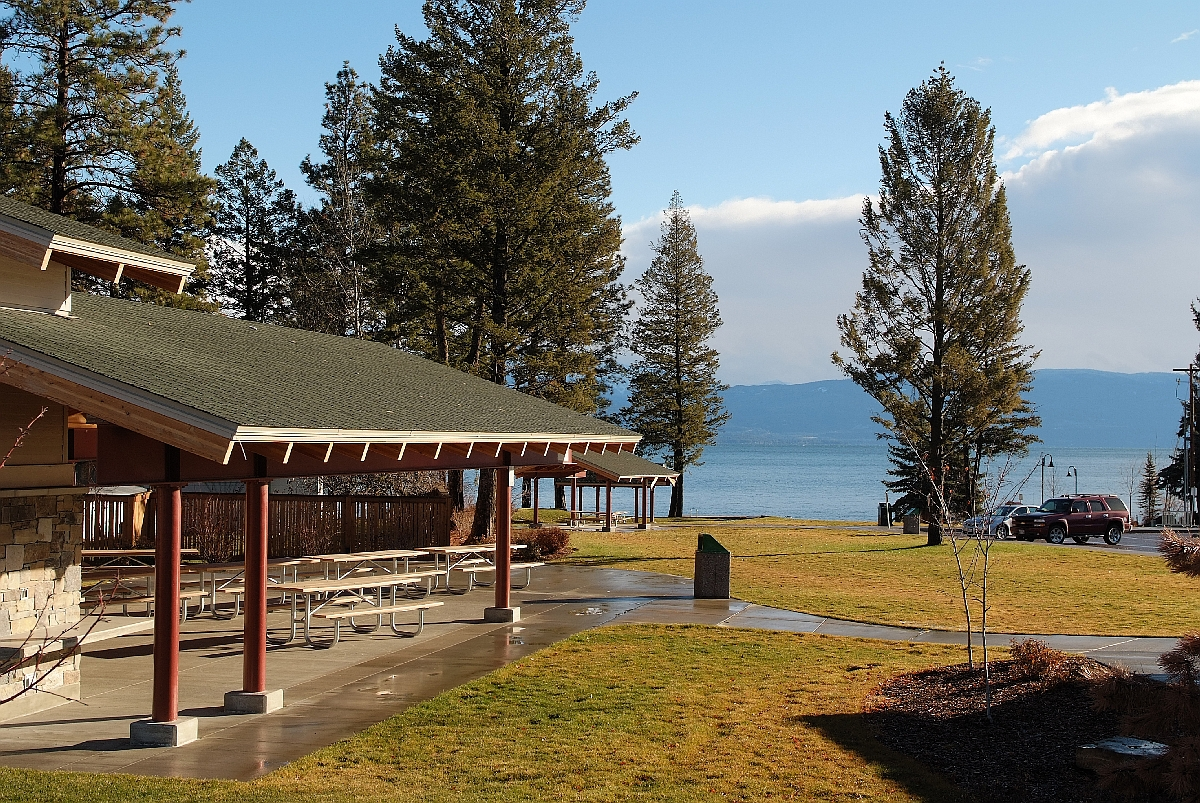
Volunteer Park

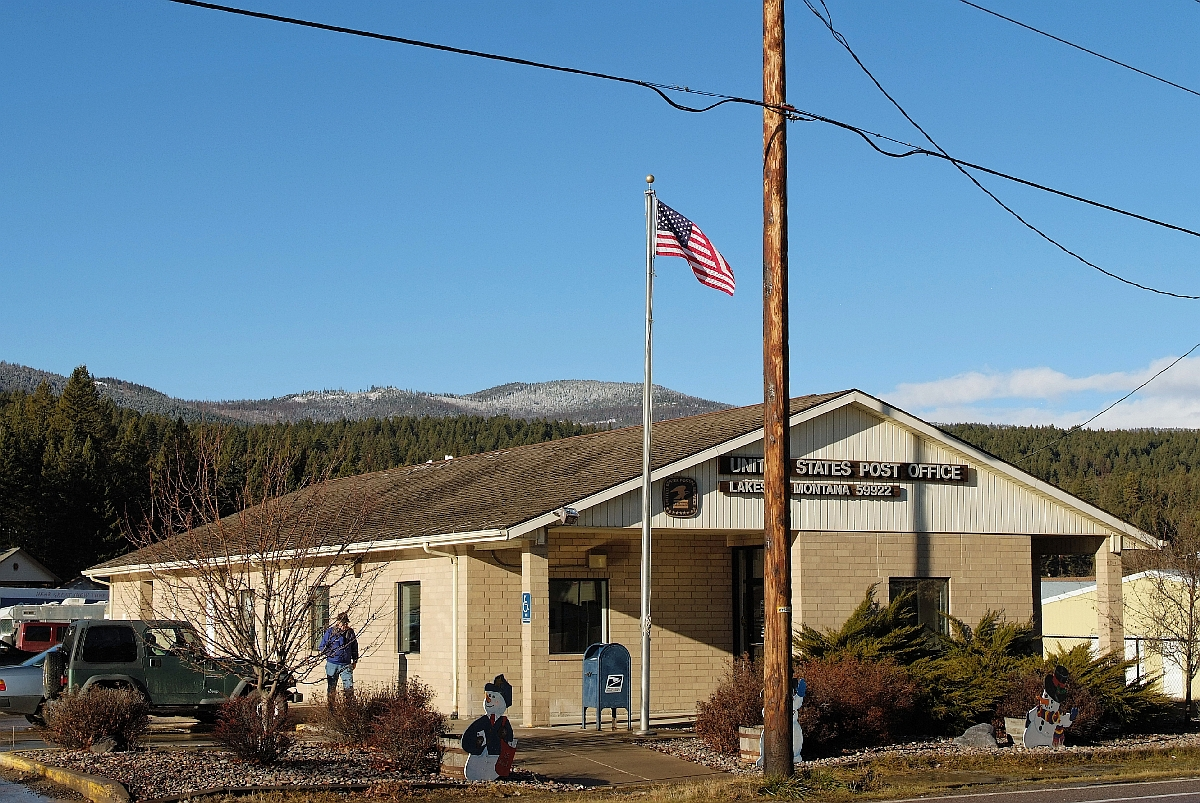
US Post Office

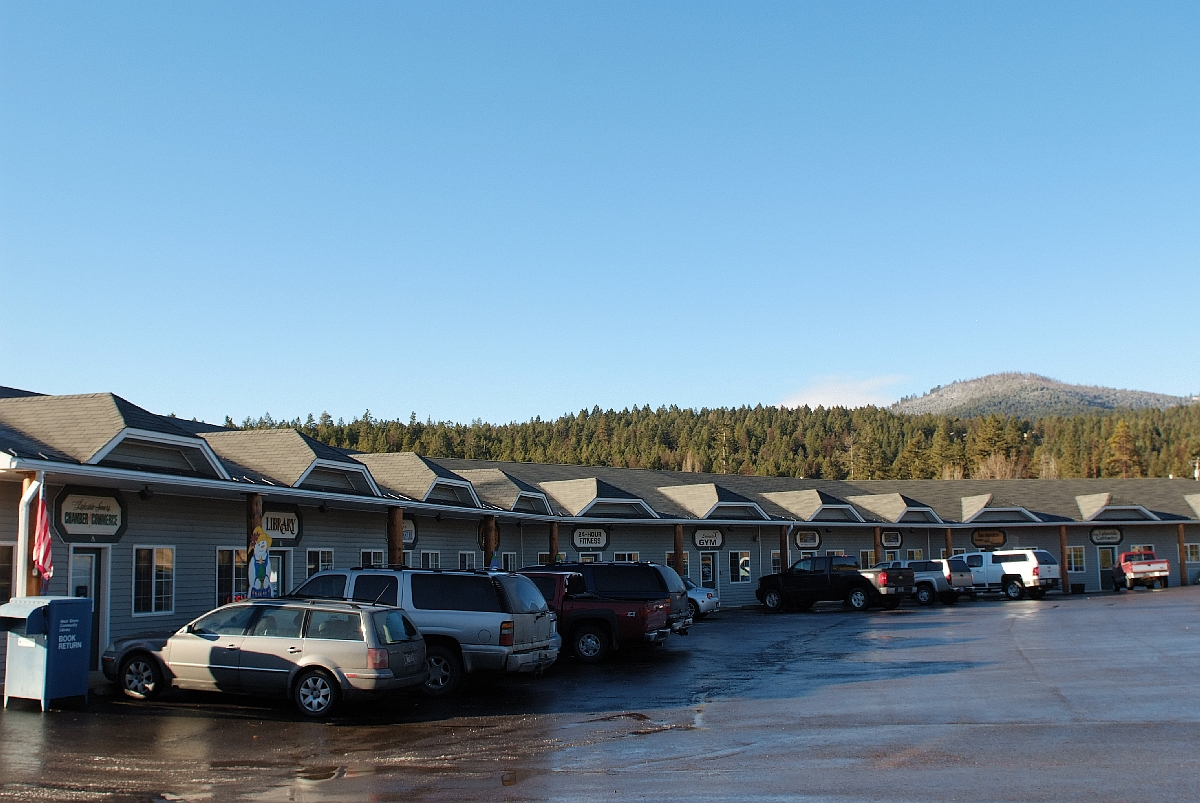
Strip mall

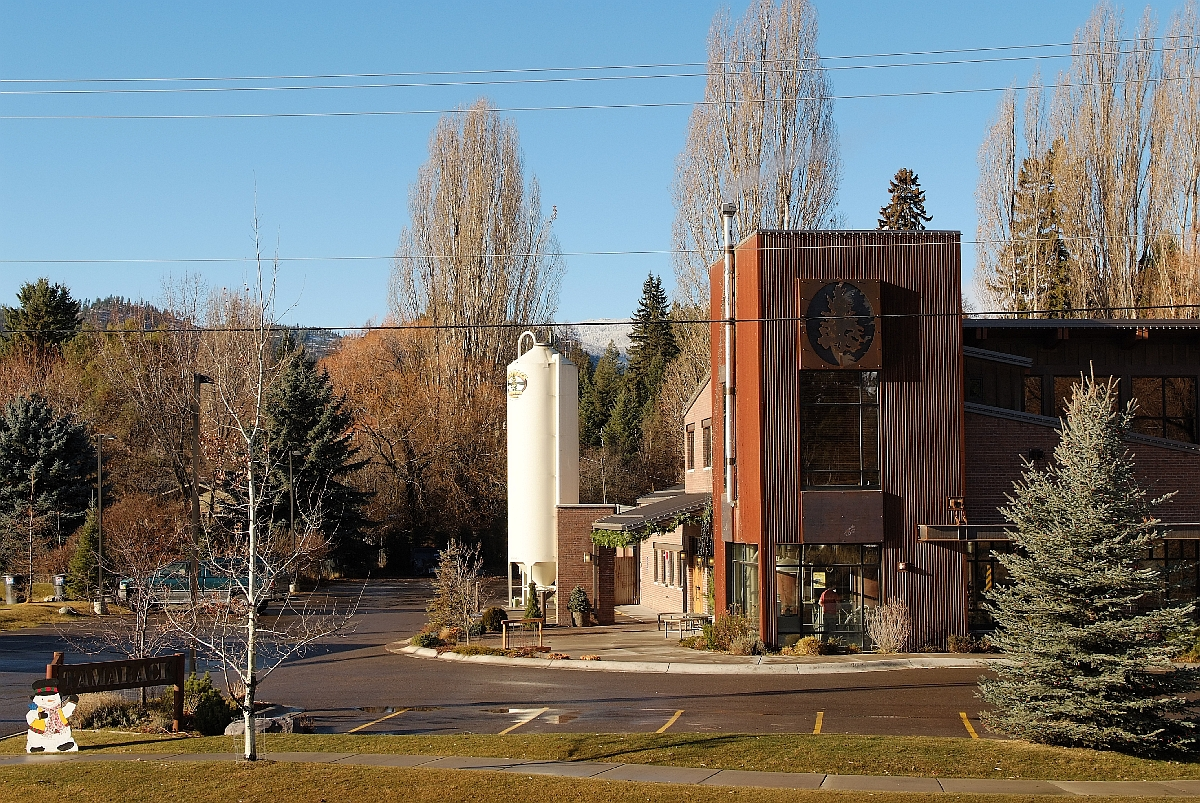
Tamarack brewery
