= List of television stations in Arizona =

This is a list of broadcast television stations that are licensed in the U.S. state of Arizona.

== Full-power ==
- Stations are arranged by media market served and channel position.

Full-power television stations in Arizona
Media market	Station	Channel	Primary affiliation(s)	Notes	Refs
Douglas	KFTU-DT	3	UniMás, Univision on 3.2		
Flagstaff	KNAZ-TV	2	NBC	(Note: Satellite of KPNX.)	
Flagstaff	KDTP	11	Daystar	(Note: Licensed to Holbrook, Arizona.)	
Flagstaff	KFPH-DT	13	UniMás, Univision on 13.2		
Kingman	KMEE-TV	6	MeTV		
Phoenix	KTVK	3	Independent		
Phoenix	KPHO-TV	5	CBS		
Phoenix	KAZT-TV	7	The CW, Independent on 7.2	(Note: Licensed to Prescott, Arizona.)	
Phoenix	KAET	8	PBS		
Phoenix	KSAZ-TV	10	Fox		
Phoenix	KPNX	12	NBC	(Note: Licensed to Mesa, Arizona.)	
Phoenix	KNXV-TV	15	ABC		
Phoenix	KPAZ-TV	21	TBN		
Phoenix	KTVW-DT	33	Univision, UniMás on 33.2		
Phoenix	KTAZ	39	Telemundo, TeleXitos on 39.2		
Phoenix	KUTP	45	MyNetworkTV		
Phoenix	KPPX-TV	51	Ion Television	(Note: Licensed to Tolleson, Arizona.)	
Phoenix	KASW	61	Independent		
Tucson	KVOA	4	NBC		
Tucson	KUAT-TV	6	PBS		
Tucson	KGUN-TV	9	ABC		
Tucson	KMSB	11	Fox		
Tucson	KOLD-TV	13	CBS, Independent on 13.5		
Tucson	KTTU	18	The CW, MyNetworkTV on 18.2		
Tucson	KUAS-TV	27	PBS	(Note: Satellite of KUAT-TV.)	
Tucson	KHRR	40	Telemundo, TeleXitos on 40.2		
Tucson	KUVE-DT	46	Univision, UniMás on 46.2	(Note: Licensed to Green Valley, Arizona.)	
Tucson	KWBA-TV	58	Independent	(Note: Licensed to Sierra Vista, Arizona.)	
Yuma	KYMA-DT	11.1; 13.1	NBC; CBS, Estrella TV on 13.3		

== Low-power ==
Low-power television stations in Arizona
Media market	Station	Channel	Network	Notes	Refs
Flagstaff	K19IP-D	19	Good News TV		
Flagstaff	K23PL-D	38	Silent	(Note: Licensed to Shonto, Arizona.)	
Flagstaff	K42IQ-D	42	IBN Television		
Kingman	K34QY-D	32	Various	(Note: Licensed to Golden Valley, Arizona.)	
Kingman	K08QN-D	33	Various		
Kingman	KKAX-LD	36	Independent	(Note: Licensed to Hilltop, Arizona.)	
Lake Havasu City	K25QW-D	5	[Blank]		
Phoenix	K14RK-D	14	Good News TV		
Phoenix	KGRF-LD	19	FNX	(Note: Licensed to the Gila River Indian Community.)	
Phoenix	K12XP-D	22	Various		
Phoenix	KTVP-LD	23	Various		
Phoenix	KFPB-LD	31	Various		
Phoenix	KPDF-CD	41	Various		
Phoenix	KVPA-LD	42	Various		
Phoenix	KPHE-LD	44	Independent		
Phoenix	KDVD-LD	50	Nuestra Visión	(Note: Licensed to Globe, Arizona.)	
Tucson	KUDF-LP	14	Estrella TV		
Tucson	K35OU-D	21	HSN		
Tucson	KPCE-LD	29	Daystar		
Yuma	KYUM-LD	15	Tele Vida Abundante		
Yuma	K17LM-D	17	3ABN Latino		
Yuma	K26PX-D	26	Spanish religious		
Yuma	KESE-LD	35	Telemundo		
Yuma	KBFY-LD	41	Various	(Note: Licensed to Fortuna, Arizona.)	

== Translators ==
Television station translators in Arizona
Media market	Station	Channel	Translating	Notes	Refs
Chloride	K30GG-D	5	KPHO-TV		
Chloride	K32DW-D	10	KLVX		
Chloride	K17NS-D	10	KSAZ-TV		
Chloride	K25PJ-D	12	KPNX		
Cottonwood	K19FD-D	3	KTVK	(Note: Licensed to Camp Verde, Arizona.)	
Cottonwood	K28OA-D	3	KTVK		
Cottonwood	K32ME-D	3	KTVK		
Cottonwood	K29LM-D	5	KPHO-TV		
Cottonwood	K35MU-D	8	KAET		
Cottonwood	K30OI-D	8	KAET		
Cottonwood	K36AE-D	10	KSAZ-TV	(Note: Licensed to Clarkdale, Arizona.)	
Cottonwood	K25MK-D	12	KPNX		
Cottonwood	K23FZ-D	15	KNXV-TV		
Cottonwood	K33NZ-D	15	KNXV-TV		
Cottonwood	K34EE-D	15; 61	KNXV-TV; KASW	(Note: Licensed to Cottonwood and Prescott, Arizona.)	
Cottonwood	K18DD-D	18	K19IP-D		
Cottonwood	WQUB500	18	K18DD-D		
Cottonwood	K21GE-D	19	K19IP-D		
Cottonwood	K31NF-D	31	K19IP-D	(Note: Licensed to Verde Valley, Arizona.)	
Cottonwood	K16BP-D	45	KUTP		
Dolan Springs	K34PE-D	5	KPHO-TV		
Dolan Springs	K35EI-D	12	KPNX		
Dolan Springs	K31PA-D	15	KNXV-TV		
Flagstaff	K25MG-D	3	KTVK		
Flagstaff	K15HY-D	3	KTVK	(Note: Licensed to Williams, Arizona.)	
Flagstaff	K17MO-D	5	KPHO-TV		
Flagstaff	KTVW-CD	6	KTVW-DT; KFPH-DT		
Flagstaff	K30DT-D	7	KAZT-TV		
Flagstaff	K14KK-D	8	KAET		
Flagstaff	K20ML-D	8	KAET	(Note: Licensed to Parks, Arizona.)	
Flagstaff	K26NG-D	10	KSAZ-TV		
Flagstaff	K31NE-D	10	KSAZ-TV		
Flagstaff	KPSN-LD	12	KPNX	(Note: Licensed to Payson, Arizona.)	
Flagstaff	K24KS-D	15	KNXV-TV		
Flagstaff	KAZF	33	KPHE-LD		
Flagstaff	K34PG-D	38	K19IP-D		
Flagstaff	K28CW-D	45	KUTP		
Globe	K14NA-D	3	KTVK		
Globe	K27KS-D	5	KPHO-TV		
Globe	K31NV-D	8	KAET		
Globe	K26OD-D	12	KPNX		
Globe	K18NN-D	16	KTVW-DT		
Globe	KDOS-LD	50	KTVW-DT		
Kingman	K23FV-D	3	KTVK		
Kingman	K18LZ-D	5	KPHO-TV		
Kingman	K20ID-D	7	KAZT-TV		
Kingman	K33OD-D	8	KAET		
Kingman	K31BI-D	8	KLAS-TV		
Kingman	K29LO-D	10	KSAZ-TV		
Kingman	K21EG-D	12	KPNX		
Kingman	K35MX-D	12	KPNX		
Kingman	K27DA-D	15	KNXV-TV	(Note: Licensed to Big Sandy Valley, Arizona.)	
Kingman	K27NT-D	15	KNXV-TV		
Kingman	K30LL-D	15	KNXV-TV		
Kingman	K14HG-D	45	KUTP		
Lake Havasu City	K29FD-D	3	KTVK		
Lake Havasu City	K26OK-D	5	KPHO-TV		
Lake Havasu City	K17DA-D	7	KAZT-TV		
Lake Havasu City	K31GZ-D	8	KAET		
Lake Havasu City	K22NK-D	10	KSAZ-TV		
Lake Havasu City	K28PO-D	12	KPNX		
Lake Havasu City	K24NG-D	15	KNXV-TV		
Lake Havasu City	K23BJ-D	36	KKAX-LD		
Lake Havasu City	K15CR-D	45	KUTP		
Meadview	K25DH-D	3	KTVK		
Meadview	K15LR-D	5	KPHO-TV		
Meadview	K36FZ-D	8	KAET		
Meadview	K23DK-D	12	KPNX		
Meadview	K21NQ-D	15	KNXV-TV		
Peach Springs	K36PE-D	10	KSAZ-TV		
Peach Springs	K26GF-D	12	KPNX		
Phoenix	K06QW-D	6	WBPI-CD	(Note: Licensed to Sentinel, Arizona.)	
Phoenix	KAZT-CD	7	KAZT-TV		
Phoenix	KGRX-LD	19	KGRF-LD		
Phoenix	KGRY-LD	28	KGRF-LD		
Phoenix	KGRQ-LD	29	KGRF-LD		
Phoenix	KFPH-CD	35	KFPH-DT		
Phoenix	KEJR-LD	40	KMOH-TV		
Phoenix	KDPH-LD	48	KDTP		
Prescott	K06AE-D	2	KNAZ-TV		
Prescott	K11LC-D	3	KTVK		
Prescott	K30JD-D	5	KPHO-TV		
Prescott	K23NJ-D	8	KAET		
Prescott	K25OM-D	10	KSAZ-TV		
Prescott	K19KV-D	15	KNXV-TV		
Prescott	K33NZ-D	15	KNXV-TV		
Prescott	K32LO-D	19	K19IP-D		
Prescott	K14HC-D	45	KUTP		
Show Low	K03FB-D	8	KAET	(Note: Licensed to Snowflake, Arizona.)	
Show Low	K07OJ-D	10	KSAZ-TV		
Tucson	K04QP-D	4	KVOA	(Note: Licensed to Casas Adobes, Arizona.)	
Tucson	K28OY-D	4	KVOA		
Tucson	K27OP-D	9	KGUN-TV	(Note: Licensed to Oro Valley, Arizona.)	
Tucson	KFTU-CD	34	KFTU-DT		
Tucson	KUVE-CD	42	KUVE-DT		
Yuma	K04SE-D	4	KTVK	(Note: Licensed to Parker, Arizona.)	
Yuma	K19CX-D	8	KAET		
Yuma	KAZS	27	KPHE-LD		
Yuma	K33MD-D	33	XHILA-TDT		
Yuma	K24NI-D	39	K19IP-D		
~Farmington, NM	K36JX-D	7	KOAT-TV	(Note: Licensed to Many Farms, Arizona.)	
~Farmington, NM	K21OD-D	12	KOBF		
~Farmington, NM	K30GL-D	13	KRQE		
~Gallup, NM	K27OR-D	12	KOBF	(Note: Licensed to Klagetoh, Arizona.)	

== Defunct ==
- KCDA Douglas (1961–1961)
- KTFL Flagstaff (2002–2006)
- KCFG Flagstaff (2000–2012)
- KOY-TV Phoenix (1953–1954, shared time with KOOL-TV)
- KIVA Yuma (1953–1970)
- KYMA-DT Yuma (1988–2020)

== See also ==
- Television stations in Sonora and Television stations in Baja California for stations across the Mexican border serving US cities
- List of Spanish-language television networks in the United States
