= KGRX-LD =

Television station in Gila River Indian Community

KGRX-LD and KGRY-LD
Gila River Indian Community, Arizona; United States
- Channels for KGRX-LD: Digital: 19 (UHF); Virtual: 19
- Channels for KGRY-LD: Digital: 28 (UHF); Virtual: 28

Programming
- Affiliations: 19.1/28.1: First Nations Experience

Ownership
- Owner: Gila River Indian Community; (Gila River Telecommunications, Inc.)
- Sister stations: GRBC (KGRQ-LD, KGRF-LD)

History
- Former affiliations: Evoca (2021–2022); Newsmax2 (April–December 2022); Real America's Voice (April–December 2022)

Technical information
- Licensing authority: FCC
- Facility ID: KGRX-LD: 187703; KGRY-LD: 187710
- Class: LD
- ERP: 15 kW
- HAAT: 470.2 m (1,543 ft)
- Transmitter coordinates: 33°19′57.3″N 112°3′57″W

Links
- Public license information: KGRX-LD: LMS
- Website: grbc.tv

KGRX-LD (channel 19) and KGRY-LD (channel 28) are low-power television stations serving the Phoenix, Arizona, United States, metropolitan area from transmitters on South Mountain. Licensed to serve the Gila River Indian Community and owned by Gila River Telecommunications, a tribal enterprise, KGRY-LD operates in the ATSC 3.0 (Next Gen TV) format and supports the forthcoming launch of Evoca, a subscription TV service, in the Phoenix area. KGRX-LD previously operated in ATSC 3.0.

These stations are separate from the Gila River Broadcasting Corporation, which primarily broadcasts First Nations Experience (FNX) from transmitters on the Community itself.

== History ==
In January 2012, the Federal Communications Commission (FCC) granted the Gila River Indian Community construction permits for a series of television stations to be located on and licensed to serve the tribe. These included K19JT-D and K28MO-D. However, it was more than seven years until activity resumed on the facility; in the case of K28MO-D, the filings by Gila River had to demonstrate that KCOS-LP, a long-defunct analog station on channel 28 whose license was still on the books, was out of service.

In August 2021, the transmitters came into service, operating for the first month with FNX programming in the ATSC 1.0 mode. On September 20, 2021, the stations converted to ATSC 3.0, though Evoca has still to launch in the Phoenix area. Subchannels are in place for the over-the-air distribution of three paid services. As in Boise, Idaho, customers will pay $9.50 a month for Evoca's Scout box, which is capable of receiving ATSC 1.0, ATSC 3.0, and broadband content.

While in its Boise and Colorado Springs markets, Evoca carried the relevant regional sports network, it has not been able to do so in Phoenix. According to Evoca CEO Todd Achilles, this is because Sinclair Broadcast Group insisted that, if Evoca wanted to carry Bally Sports Arizona, it would have to pay retransmission consent fees for Sinclair's broadcast stations in the Boise market (CBS affiliate KBOI-TV and CW affiliate KYUU-LD). In April 2022, KGRX-LD reverted to ATSC 1.0, citing lack of receivers in use. They returned to ATSC 1.0 with content from two different conservative-themed political networks, Newsmax2 and Real America's Voice. It was later discovered that the station was being programmed by a third party operator, and "the Community is currently considering all available options to remove this programming, which it does not endorse." As of January 2023, both networks have been removed from the channel and it carries a simulcast of sister stations KGRQ-LD and KGRF-LD, both affiliates of FNX. KGRY-LD continues to broadcast in ATSC 3.0.

== Subchannel ==
Subchannels of KGRX-LD
Subchannel	Res.	Short name	Programming
19.1	1080i	KGRQ-LD	FNX (simulcast of GRBC)

All ATSC 3.0 stations must provide at least one channel of free-to-air television programming. As with Boise's Evoca transmitters, this obligation is fulfilled by airing BYU TV on each transmitter. Evoca offers additional programming utilizing the hybrid functionality of ATSC 3.0, similar to Hybrid Broadcast Broadband TV (HbbTV) in Europe.

Subchannels of KGRY-LD (ATSC 3.0)
Subchannel	Short name	Programming
28.1	BYUKGRY	BYU TV
100.090	Criosty	CuriosityStream
100.100	Insight	Insight TV
100.133	Mav TV	MAVTV
100.141	NFL	NFL Network

Encrypted subscription service

== See also ==
- KBSE-LD and KEVA-LD, the Evoca transmitters in Boise, Idaho
- Gila River Broadcasting Corporation
