= SWX NonStop Local Sports =

Television station in Montana, United States

SWX
- Country: United States
- First air date: August 30, 2008
- TV stations: KHQ-TV 6.2; KNDO 23.3; KNDU 25.3; KSWX 9.1; KULR-TV 8.2; KWYB 18.3; KWYB-LD 28.3; KFBB-TV 5.3; KHBB-LD 21.3; KTMF 23.3; KTMF-LD 42.3
- Broadcast area: Eastern Washington; Idaho Panhandle; Montana
- Owner: Cowles Company (KHQ, Incorporated)
- Official website: www.swxrightnow.com

KSWX
- Walla Walla, Washington; United States
- Channels: Digital: 9 (VHF); Virtual: 9

Programming
- Affiliations: 9.1: SWX NonStop Local Sports

Ownership
- Owner: Cowles Company; (KHQ, Incorporated)

History
- Founded: September 13, 2022
- First air date: September 10, 2025
- Former call signs: KWAL (2022–2026)

Technical information
- Licensing authority: FCC
- Facility ID: 776246
- ERP: 160 kW
- HAAT: 110 m (361 ft)
- Transmitter coordinates: 46°31′51″N 117°56′42″W

Links
- Public license information: Public file; LMS

Older logo

SWX NonStop Local Sports (formerly SWX Right Now) is a regional digital multicast television network operated by Cowles Company. It carries a mix of automated blocks of local news programming, along with sports discussion programs, local sporting events (particularly high school and college sports, such as Gonzaga University basketball and the Big Sky Conference), and syndicated sports and outdoors programming. In Montana, SWX is an affiliate of the Kraken Hockey Network, carrying regional Seattle Kraken National Hockey League games.

SWX is broadcast on the digital subchannels of Cowles' stations across Eastern Washington State, the Idaho Panhandle, and Montana, on KSWX (channel 9) in Walla Walla, Washington, as well as local television providers.

== Stations ==
| Station | City | Over-the-Air | Cable |
|---|---|---|---|
| KHQ-TV | Spokane | 6-2 | Comcast 306 (SD) Comcast 112 (HD) |
| KHQ-TV | Coeur d'Alene | 6-2 | Spectrum 1245 |
| KHQ-TV | Pullman-Moscow (ID) | 6-2 | Spectrum 1245 |
| KHQ-TV | Lewiston (ID) | 6-2 | Cable One 36 |
| KHQ-TV | Sandpoint (ID) | 6-2 | Northland 115 |
| KNDU-TV | Kennewick–Pasco–Richland | 25-3 | Spectrum 183 |
| KNDO-TV | Yakima | 23-3 | Spectrum 183 |
| KSWX | Walla Walla | 9-1 | Spectrum 183 |
| KULR-TV | Billings (MT) | 8-2 | Spectrum 195 |
| KWYB | Butte (MT)–Bozeman (MT) | 18-3 | Spectrum 199 |
| KFBB-TV | Great Falls (MT) | 5-3 | Spectrum 199 |
| KHBB-LD | Helena (MT) | 18-3 | Spectrum 199 |
| KTMF | Missoula (MT)–Kalispell (MT) | 23-3 | Spectrum 199 |

== Programming ==
=== Sports coverage ===
==== College ====
- Eastern Washington University football
- University of Idaho football
- Gonzaga University men's and women's basketball
- Crimson & Gray football scrimmage

==== Local events ====
- Armed Forces Torchlight Parade
- Bloomsday Race

==== Greater Spokane League high school basketball ====
- Rubber Chicken Lewis and Clark High School vs Joel E. Ferris High School Rivalry Basketball games & Spirit contest
- Groovy Shoes Shadle Park High School vs North Central High School Rivalry Basketball games & Spirit contest
- Stinky Sneaker University High School vs Central Valley High School Rivalry Basketball games & Spirit contest

==== Local sports ====
- Seattle Kraken hockey (Montana only)
- Spokane Zephyr FC soccer (Washington and Idaho)
- Spokane Velocity soccer (Washington and Idaho)
- HAPO Columbia Cup (hydroplane racing)
- Spokane Chiefs hockey
- Tri-City Americans hockey
- Spokane Indians baseball

=== Original and syndicated programs ===
- The Brock & Salk Show, a television simulcast of Brock Huard and Mike Salk's radio show on KIRO
- Wyman & Bob, a television simulcast of Dave Wyman and Bob Stelton's radio show on KIRO
- The Mark Few Show, a weekly Gonzaga men's basketball show featuring head coach Mark Few.
- This Week in the Big Sky Conference
- Washington Sports Wrap, a sportscast produced by KCPQ.
- GMFB: Overtime
