= Gila River Broadcasting Corporation =

Television network of the Gila River Indian Community

KGRQ-LD and KGRF-LD

KGRQ-LD: Stotonic Village, Arizona; KGRF-LD: Maricopa Village, Arizona; United States
- Channels for KGRQ-LD: Digital: 21 (UHF); Virtual: 29
- Channels for KGRF-LD: Digital: 21 (UHF); Virtual: 29
- Branding: GRBC

Programming
- Affiliations: 29.1: First Nations Experience

Ownership
- Owner: Gila River Indian Community; (Gila River Telecommunications, Inc.)

History
- Founded: December 2014
- First air date: April 6, 2015
- Call sign meaning: Gila River

Technical information
- Licensing authority: FCC
- Facility ID: KGRQ-LD: 187708; KGRF-LD: 187709
- Class: LD
- ERP: 15 kW
- HAAT: KGRQ-LD: 397.5 m (1,304 ft); KGRF-LD: −15.8 m (−52 ft)
- Transmitter coordinates: KGRQ-LD: 33°0′6.9″N 111°40′28.7″W; KGRF-LD: 33°22′37.1″N 112°13′33.9″W

Links
- Public license information: KGRQ-LD: LMS
- Website: grbc.tv

The Gila River Broadcasting Corporation (GRBC) is a television network serving the Gila River Indian Community (GRIC) in south-central Arizona, United States. It is owned by the Community through tribal enterprise Gila River Telecommunications.

GRBC broadcasts on two low-power UHF stations near the Community's major population centers: KGRQ-LD (channel 21, previously channel 29) at Stotonic Village and KGRF-LD (channel 21, previously channel 19) at Maricopa Village. Both stations use virtual channel 29.

In addition, Gila River Telecommunications owns two additional stations licensed to the Community, KGRX-LD and KGRY-LD (channels 19 and 28). These stations, broadcasting from South Mountain and built in 2021, carry GRBC programming, with one in ATSC 1.0 format, and the other in ATSC 3.0 (Next Gen TV) format. These two stations were initially broadcasting in ATSC 3.0 format and formulated for Evoca subscription based content delivery platform until Evoca ceased operations in late 2022.

== History ==
GRBC launched in December 2014, 2 1/2 years after the GRIC (Gila River Indian Community) filed for the new television stations with the Federal Communications Commission (FCC). However, when Gila River Telecommunications was founded in 1989, a television station was planned but found to be cost-prohibitive. Its official launch occurred on April 6, 2015.

Programming includes public service announcements and tribal content and local and pre-produced live content related to the community.

Master control for GRBC is located at the Gila River Telecommunications facility, on the northern edge of the Community, near Chandler, Arizona.

On November 30, 2018, GRBC took a third transmitter, KGRY-LD at Blackwater, silent, as its channel was needed to repack KGRQ. Gila River Telecommunications requested cancellation of KGRY's license on June 5, 2019. It then assigned the call letters KGRY-LD to K28MO-D, a construction permit for a transmitter on South Mountain, and KGRF-LD to the former K19JV-D, a construction permit also at that site.

== Subchannel ==
Subchannels of KGRQ-LD and KGRF-LD
Subchannel	Res.	Short name	Programming
29.1	1080i	KGRQ-LD	First Nations Experience
