= WEFG-LD =

Television station in Philadelphia

- Philadelphia, Pennsylvania; United States
- Channels: Digital: 21 (UHF); Virtual: 7

Programming
- Affiliations: 7.1: [Blank]

Ownership
- Owner: Philadelphia Television Network, Inc.

History
- First air date: August 16, 1991
- Former call signs: W07CB (1991–2001); WPTV-LP (2001); WWJT-LP (2001–2010)
- Former channel numbers: Analog: 7 (VHF, 1991–2010)
- Former affiliations: Channel America/Family Net (1992–1995?); TV Scout (1995–1997, 2011–20??); The Box (1997–2001); MTV2 (2001–2007); MTV Tres (2007–2011)

Technical information
- Licensing authority: FCC
- Facility ID: 167606
- Class: LD
- ERP: 15 kW
- HAAT: 103.2 m (339 ft)
- Transmitter coordinates: 40°4′58.2″N 75°10′54.6″W

Links
- Public license information: LMS
- Website: www.channel7philly.com

WEFG-LD (channel 7) is a low-power television station in Philadelphia, Pennsylvania, United States. The station has been owned by the Philadelphia Television Network since November 10, 1999.

== History ==
=== Early years ===
Channel 7 first appeared in December 1991 as W07CB ("WOCB"), the first Philadelphia-licensed VHF television station since May 1948.

In 1992, W07CB, not affiliated with a major network, aired reruns and old B-movies. Affiliations included the Canadian music video channel MuchMusic, Channel America, and FamilyNet. General Manager and part-owner Ron Joseph telecast reruns of his 1970s-era disco dance shows. The station achieved some degree of success under Joseph's stewardship. However, a dispute between the four owners of the station resulted in the decreased influence of Joseph over station affairs.

=== Changes ===
Within a year, the station underwent a series of management changes. Dr. Walter Moxley IV, an infectious disease specialist with no previous broadcasting experience, was named the new general manager. His son Michael Moxley was brought in to host local programming and acquire new revenue streams. Viewership and revenue picked up, but the station's transmitter was vandalized causing the station to go off the air for several weeks. As a result of being off the air, advertisement revenue dried up, and Michael Moxley departed W07CB to attend Penn State.

By June 1994, the station's parent company Morton Broadcasting named George Brusstar, operator of small but profitable cable television operations in the Philadelphia suburbs, as its Director of Programming. All of the station's programming was abruptly scrapped along with the station's then-slogan ("T-V Heaven, Channel 7"). The station's new logo became "The Bell", modeled after Philadelphia's Liberty Bell according to Brusstar. Replacing the old disco shows, classic westerns, and vintage sitcoms was a new format of 24-hour "two-way talk" programming featuring live TV hosts sitting at a desk with telephones. Viewers could call in live and sound off on the issues of the day with the hosts. Brusstar hired former Philadelphia radio performer Dennis Marcucci and Modesto, California, television personality Al Mario to host shows on the new lineup. In addition, Brusstar himself was a featured host, and was joined by then-17-year-old Port Richmond resident Mike Phillips.

A contractual dispute in late 1994 resulted in Brusstar's sudden departure, and all local programming ceased. Brusstar was replaced by Mario who hired local college students, activists, and radio personalities in an attempt to cement a stable evening line-up. Programs included music (Dr. Soul's Radio on TV), comedy (A Sermon from the Reverend Spoonicci), and current events commentaries from Mario, homelessness activist Leona Smith, and libertarian Sean McBride. From 11 p.m. to 7 a.m., programming consisted of live TV psychics from a low-power New York City station brought in via satellite. By June 1995, infighting between owners forced W07CB off the air.

=== Later developments ===
When Channel 7 next appeared, it was clear Ron Joseph was back in control; for weeks on end, a two-hour VHS tape loop of his recent wedding played continuously. Joseph attempted to take the station back entirely via a loophole in the partnership agreement (partner Moxley was imprisoned for the assault of a family member). Joseph later operated a low-power TV channel in Wildwood–Cape May, New Jersey, W05AX.

In 1996, with few advertisers left, Morton Broadcasting was dissolved and the Federal Communications Commission (FCC) license for Channel 7 was sold to Shooting Star Productions. Executive Producer Jerry Leazer created a 24/7 music video programming format concentrating on the music roots of The Sounds Of Philadelphia. The format was an immediate success and Morton Broadcasting spent over a year trying to break the contract between Morton Broadcasting and Shooting Star Productions so they could sell the station for a higher price now that Leazer had dramatically increased the station's value. Shooting Star Productions, which had been represented by Reed Smith Shaw and McClay in Philadelphia and Richard Glanton, ultimately sold their interest to Glanton to avoid any further litigation. By the end of the 1990s, Channel 7 reduced its power, and programmed modern rap music videos. It could only be seen 1.5 miles (2 km) from its Philadelphia transmitter, as opposed to a 14-mile (23 km) radius just a few years before. The station currently transmits a strongly-directional pattern, aiming most of its signal to the south-southwest portions of Philadelphia with lower power in other directions. This is to protect WABC-TV in New York City, also on Channel 7, about 70 mi (113 km) away.

On July 31, 1998, the FCC granted W07CB voluntary transfer of control from Ronald Joseph Caponigro to Digital Media T.V.

On November 10, 1999, Morton Broadcasting Company sold W07CB to Philadelphia Television Network, Inc.

The W07CB call letters were changed to WPTV-LP in November 2001 (not related to full power NBC affiliate WPTV (channel 5) in West Palm Beach, Florida). A month later, the call letters were changed again to WWJT-LP. On January 27, 2010, WWJT received another call sign, WWJT-LD, for the digital facility while still retaining the call sign WWJT-LP for the analog facility. WWJT-LD changed its call sign to WEFG-LD on January 1, 2014.

WWJT was relaunched on October 15, 2006, as African Community Television. The station aired a mix of news, movies, infomercials and music videos, as well as various African shows.

== Technical information ==
=== Subchannels ===
The station's signal is multiplexed:

Subchannels of WEFG-LD
Subchannel	Res.	Short name	Programming
7.1	480i	WEFG	[Blank]

=== Analog-to-digital conversion ===
On June 16, 2010, WWJT-LP ceased analog transmission due to its analog transmitter and video server suffering catastrophic failures, keeping the station off the air until the launch of digital WWJT-LD.

Starting on or about November 17, 2011, WWJT-LD began broadcasting a digital signal on virtual channel 7 showing just the call letters and its three sub channels displaying a color test pattern. All four channels are currently in 480i SD digital format.
