= KTMF =

Television station in Missoula, Montana

KTMF and KTMF-LD

KTMF: Missoula, Montana; KTMF-LD: Kalispell, Montana; United States
- Channels for KTMF: Digital: 23 (UHF); Virtual: 23
- Channels for KTMF-LD: Digital: 36 (UHF); Virtual: 42
- Branding: KTMF: NonStop Local Missoula; KTMF-LD: NonStop Local Kalispell

Programming
- Affiliations: 23.1/42.1: ABC; 23.2/42.2: Fox/MyNetworkTV; 23.3/42.2: SWX Right Now

Ownership
- Owner: Cowles Company; (Cowles Montana Media Company)

History
- Founded: KTMF: April 12, 1989; KTMF-LD: January 6, 1992
- First air date: KTMF: November 16, 1990; KTMF-LD: July 11, 1995
- Former call signs: KTMF: KLFV (CP, 1989–1990); KTMF-LD: K59EQ (1992–1995); KTMF-LP (1995–2013)
- Former channel number: KTMF: Analog: 23 (UHF, 1990–2009); Digital: 36 (UHF, until 2009); KTMF-LD: Analog: 59 (UHF, 1995–2006), 42 (UHF, 2006–2013); Digital: 42 (UHF, 2013–2018)
- Call sign meaning: "Television Missoula Flathead"

Technical information
- Licensing authority: FCC
- Facility ID: KTMF: 14675; KTMF-LD: 14676
- Class: KTMF-LD: LD
- ERP: KTMF: 92.6 kW; KTMF-LD: 2.48 kW
- HAAT: KTMF: 642 m (2,106 ft); KTMF-LD: 120 m (394 ft)
- Transmitter coordinates: KTMF: 47°1′10″N 114°0′49″W; KTMF-LD: 48°10′33.9″N 114°21′0.2″W
- Translator: see § Subchannels

Links
- Public license information: KTMF: Public file; LMS; KTMF-LD: Public file; LMS
- Website: www.nonstoplocal.com/missoula/

KTMF (channel 23) is a television station in Missoula, Montana, United States, affiliated with ABC and Fox. Owned by the Cowles Company, the station has studios on Stephens Avenue in Missoula, and its transmitter is located on TV Mountain north of the city.

KTMF-LD (channel 42) in Kalispell, Montana, operates as a semi-satellite of KTMF. As such, it simulcasts all network and syndicated programming as provided through KTMF, but airs separate commercial inserts and legal identifications. KTMF-LD's transmitter is located on Kookoosint Trail in Lone Pine State Park southwest of Kalispell.

KTMF's signal is rebroadcast on several other low-power translator stations in the Flathead Lake area of northwestern Montana.

== History ==
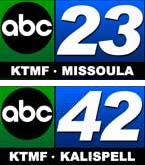
KTMF's "ABC 23" and "ABC 42" logos, used during the mid-2000s

On April 12, 1989, the Federal Communications Commission (FCC) granted an original construction permit to Continental Television Network (CTN) for a full-service station on channel 23 to serve Missoula. The station soon took the call letters KLFV, but before the station went on air, had changed call signs again, this time to KTMF. The station went on the air on November 16, 1990. This made Missoula one of the last cities in the nation to get full service from all three major networks. Previously, ABC had been relegated to limited clearances on NBC affiliate KECI-TV (channel 13) and CBS affiliate KPAX-TV (channel 8). The full ABC schedule could be seen via cable from KXLY-TV in Spokane. KECI had dropped ABC programming in 1989 to become a full-time NBC affiliate. The studios on Stephens Avenue once housed Carousel, a former bar. Fox programming was added to KTMF's lineup in 1994.

In February 2001, CTN sold KTMF, along with the then-KTMF-LP in Kalispell, KWYB in Butte, KWYB-LP in Bozeman and KTGF in Great Falls, to Max Media of Montana. They were the first television station acquisitions in Montana for Max Media.

On July 13, 2009, KTMF's second subchannel was launched to carry Fox, after Equity's KMMF (channel 17) and Kalispell repeater KMMF-LP (channel 34) were taken silent on the June 12, 2009, digital switchover date due to Equity's bankruptcy and KMMF having no digital facilities to transition to. Fox's secondary network MyNetworkTV is seen in a delayed manner on the subchannel from 10:05 p.m. to 12:05 a.m., and is carried unpromoted in any way outside of network promotions.

On September 30, 2013, the Cowles Company acquired Max Media's Montana television station cluster (which, in addition to KTMF and KWYB, also included KFBB-TV in Great Falls, KHBB-LD in Helena, and NBC affiliate KULR-TV in Billings) for $18 million. The sale was completed on November 29.

=== KTMF-LD history ===
On January 6, 1992, the FCC granted an original construction permit to CTN for a low-power station on channel 59 to serve Kalispell. The station was given call sign K59EQ, and after an expired construction permit and a couple of extensions of the new permit, K59EQ was licensed on July 11, 1995. The station changed its call sign to KTMF-LP later in the same year.

In February 2001, CTN sold the station to Max Media of Montana as part of the same transaction as KTMF. KTMF-LP was granted a permit to move to channel 42 in October 2003 and as of August 2006, the station had completed the move, but had not applied for a license to operate on the new channel.

On May 27, 2010, KTMF-LP was granted a construction permit to flash-cut from analog to digital on channel 42. On January 4, 2013, the station changed its call sign to KTMF-LD. KTMF-LD was included in Cowles' 2013 purchase of Max Media's Montana stations. The station was licensed to move its digital broadcast to channel 36 effective December 26, 2018.

== News operation ==
KTMF's first local news service came under Max Media ownership in September 2002, when Max contracted Independent News Network of Davenport, Iowa, to produce a regional newscast for KWYB, KTMF, and KTGF, all third-to-air stations in their markets with no local news at the time. Six reporters, one each in the five areas serviced by the Max Montana stations and another in Helena, contributed reports to Big Sky News at 5 and 10 p.m., which was presented from Iowa. The early newscast was dropped at the start of 2004.

In 2005, Max Media acquired KFBB-TV in Great Falls, selling KTGF. Unlike KTGF, KFBB-TV produced its own local news. At that time, Big Sky News was replaced with a 10 p.m. newscast branded Montana News Network, produced from Great Falls and servicing all of the company's Montana stations except KULR-TV in Billings. This newscast was subsequently discontinued, and for several years the only local newscast on the station was a ten-minute late newscast, 10@10.

KTMF started its own news operation in August 2012 in preparation for the launch of a 9 p.m. newscast on its Fox subchannel a month later.

== Technical information ==
=== Subchannels ===
The stations' signals are multiplexed:

Subchannels of KTMF and KTMF-LD
Channel		Res.	Short name	Programming
KTMF	KTMF-LD	Res.	Short name	Programming
23.1	42.1	720p	KTMFABC	ABC
23.2	42.2	720p	KTMFFOX	Fox & MyNetworkTV
23.3	42.3	720p	KTMFSWX	SWX Right Now

On September 26, 2001, the FCC granted a construction permit to build KTMF-DT on UHF channel 36. The station received special temporary authority (STA) on April 22, 2001, to broadcast at reduced power. KTMF elected to move its digital signal to channel 23 following the completion of the digital television transition, switching over on the original target date of February 17, 2009.

=== Translators ===
- K35JT-D Drummond
- K36KR-D Elmo, Big Arm
- K14NI-D Ferndale
- K15IY-D Heron
- K16NF-D Hot Springs
- K19GD-D Kalispell & Lakeside
- KTMF-LD 36 Kalispell
- K30KY-D Philipsburg
- K14LT-D Polson
- K16KZ-D Quartz Creek, etc.
- K36PM-D Salmon, ID
- K09YT-D Sula
- K21MW-D Thompson Falls
- K07IT-D West Glacier, etc.
- K31PD-D Whitefish, etc.
- K07EN-D Woodsbay, Lakeside
