= KGCS-LD =

Television station in Joplin, Missouri

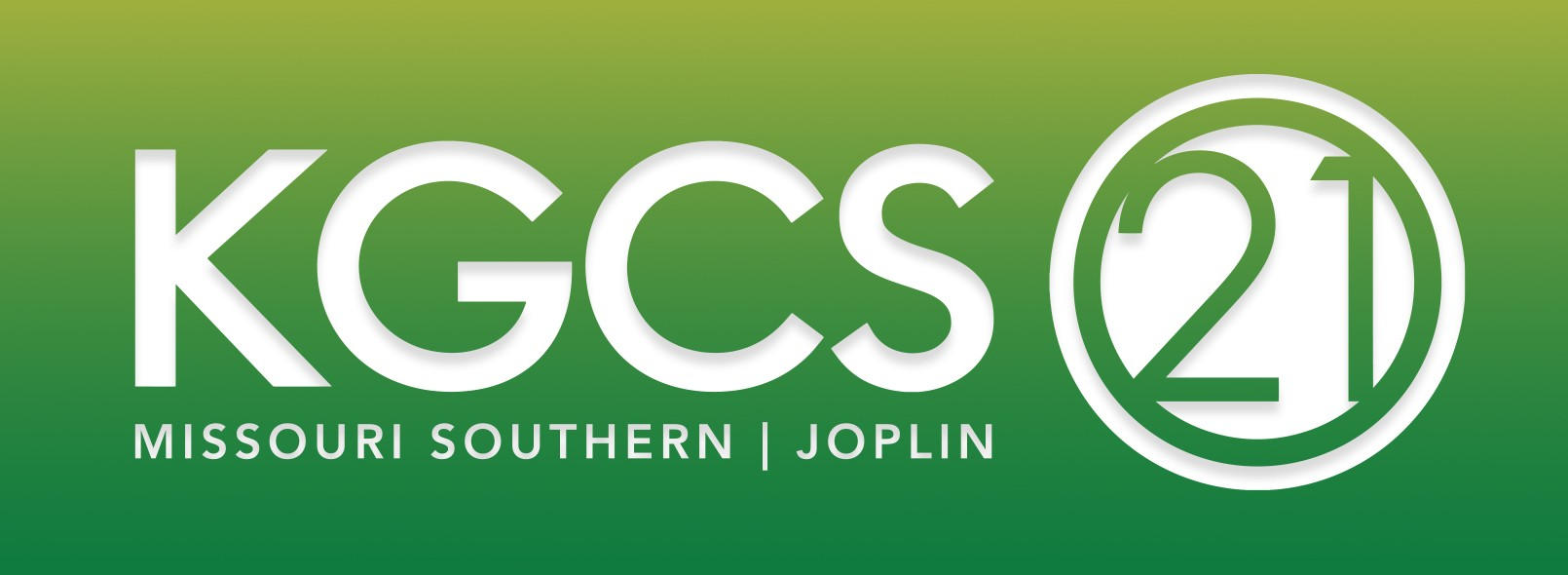
- Joplin, Missouri; United States
- Channels: Digital: 21 (UHF); Virtual: 21

Programming
- Affiliations: 21.1: YTA TV

Ownership
- Owner: Missouri Southern State University; (Board of Governors-Missouri Southern State University)

History
- Founded: January 24, 1986
- First air date: 1988
- Former call signs: K57DR (1988–1995); KGCS-LP (1995–2009)
- Former channel numbers: Analog: 57 (UHF, 1986–2009); Digital: 22 (UHF, 2009–2019)
- Former affiliations: America One

Technical information
- Licensing authority: FCC
- Facility ID: 4206
- Class: LD
- ERP: 15 kW
- HAAT: 213.7 m (701 ft); 46 m (151 ft) (CP)
- Transmitter coordinates: 37°5′49.2″N 94°34′25.8″W; 37°5′57″N 94°27′46″W (CP)

Links
- Public license information: LMS
- Website: Official website

KGCS-LD (channel 21) is a low-power television station in Joplin, Missouri, United States, affiliated with YTA TV. The station is owned by Missouri Southern State University.

== History ==
The station began in September 1984 as MSTV, a cable-exclusive student-access television station. Student-produced programming was the main staple for the channel. The channel began broadcasting city council meetings in Joplin, and those broadcasts still happen on the station in the present. Although the construction permit for the over-the-air signal was issued in January 1986, it was not on the air until sometime in 1988. In 1988, the station launched as K57DR operating on analog UHF channel 57. The transmitter was erected just before the signal went on the air. In 1995, the station's callsign was changed to KGCS-LP. The station's digital signal on UHF channel 22 has been on the air since 2008, and the station changed the call letters to the current KGCS-LD in July 2009 after voluntarily shutting down their analog signal.

== Subchannel ==
Subchannel of KGCS-LD
Subchannel	Res.	Short name	Programming
21.1	720p	KGCS-LD	YTA TV
