= KANG-LD =

Television station in San Angelo, Texas

- San Angelo, Texas; United States
- Channels: Digital: 21 (UHF), shared with KEUS-LD; Virtual: 31
- Branding: UniMás San Angelo

Programming
- Affiliations: 31.1: UniMás

Ownership
- Owner: Entravision Communications; (Entravision Holdings, LLC)
- Sister stations: KEUS-LD

History
- Founded: February 9, 1999
- First air date: January 11, 2000
- Former call signs: K31DM (1992–2001); KEUS-LP (2001–2013); KANG-LP (2013–2020)
- Former channel numbers: Analog: 31 (UHF, 2000–2020)
- Former affiliations: Univision (2000–2002); TeleFutura (2002–2013)

Technical information
- Licensing authority: FCC
- Facility ID: 48014
- Class: LD
- ERP: 5.9 kW
- HAAT: 122.7 m (403 ft)
- Transmitter coordinates: 31°29′47″N 100°28′40.4″W

Links
- Public license information: LMS

KANG-LD (channel 31) is a low-power television station in San Angelo, Texas, United States, affiliated with the Spanish-language network UniMás. It is owned by Entravision Communications alongside Univision affiliate KEUS-LD (channel 41). Through a channel sharing agreement, the two stations transmit using KEUS-LD's spectrum from an antenna on North Bryant Boulevard in San Angelo.

== Subchannel ==
Subchannels of KEUS-LD and KANG-LD
License	Channel	Res.	Short name	Programming
KEUS-LD	41.1	1080i	Univisn	Univision
KEUS-LD	41.2	480i	LATV	LATV
KEUS-LD	41.88	1080i	AltaVsn	AltaVision
KANG-LD	31.1	480i	KANG	UniMás

Subchannel broadcast with MPEG-4 video
