= KEUS-LD =

Television station in San Angelo, Texas

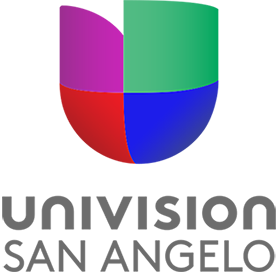
- San Angelo, Texas; United States
- Channels: Digital: 21 (UHF, shared with KANG-LD); Virtual: 41
- Branding: Univision San Angelo; Noticias Univision Oeste de Texas

Programming
- Affiliations: 41.1: Univision; 41.2: LATV; 41.88: AltaVision

Ownership
- Owner: Entravision Communications; (Entravision Holdings, LLC)
- Sister stations: KANG-LD

History
- Founded: February 8, 1999
- First air date: January 11, 2000
- Former call signs: K41DO (1992–2000); KANG-LP (2000–2002); KANG-CA (2002–2013); KEUS-CA (2013–2014); KEUS-CD (2014)
- Former channel numbers: Analog: 41 (UHF, 2000–2014); Digital: 41 (UHF, 2014–2018)
- Former affiliations: The Box (2000–2001); Classified Ads (2001–2002)

Technical information
- Licensing authority: FCC
- Facility ID: 48013
- Class: LD
- ERP: 5.9 kW
- HAAT: 122.7 m (403 ft)
- Transmitter coordinates: 31°29′47″N 100°28′40.4″W

Links
- Public license information: LMS
- Website: noticiassanangelo.com

KEUS-LD (channel 41) is a low-power television station in San Angelo, Texas, United States, affiliated with the Spanish-language network Univision. It is owned by Entravision Communications alongside UniMás affiliate KANG-LD (channel 31). Through a channel sharing agreement, the two stations transmit using KEUS-LD's spectrum from an antenna on North Bryant Boulevard in San Angelo.

== History ==
The station signed on the air in 2000 as K41DO.

== Subchannels ==
Subchannels of KEUS-LD and KANG-LD
License	Subchannel	Res.	Short name	Programming
KEUS-LD	41.1	1080i	Univisn	Univision
KEUS-LD	41.2	480i	LATV	LATV
KEUS-LD	41.88	1080i	AltaVsn	AltaVision
KANG-LD	31.1	480i	KANG	UniMás

Subchannel broadcast with MPEG-4 video
