= KHQ-TV =

Television station in Spokane, Washington

- Spokane, Washington; Coeur d'Alene, Idaho; United States
- City: Spokane, Washington
- Channels: Digital: 15 (UHF); Virtual: 6
- Branding: NonStop Local KHQ

Programming
- Affiliations: 6.1: NBC; 6.2: SWX

Ownership
- Owner: Cowles Company; (KHQ, Incorporated)
- Sister stations: KSWX

History
- First air date: December 20, 1952
- Former channel numbers: Analog: 6 (VHF, 1952–2009)
- Former affiliations: ABC (secondary, 1952–1954)
- Call sign meaning: Taken from KHQ radio, now KQNT

Technical information
- Licensing authority: FCC
- Facility ID: 34537
- ERP: 1,000 kW
- HAAT: 653 m (2,142 ft)
- Transmitter coordinates: 47°34′52″N 117°17′51″W
- Translator(s): see § Translators

Links
- Public license information: Public file; LMS
- Website: www.khq.com

KHQ-TV (channel 6) is a television station in Spokane, Washington, United States, affiliated with NBC. It is the flagship and namesake of the KHQ Television Group, a subsidiary of the locally based Cowles Company, which also owns The Spokesman-Review newspaper. KHQ-TV's studios are located on West Sprague Avenue in Downtown Spokane, and its transmitter is located on Krell Hill southeast of the city. The station also operates a 24-hour sports and weather channel called SWX Right Now on digital subchannel 6.2.

KHQ-TV is also carried on cable systems in the Canadian province of Alberta, including Calgary and Edmonton. KHQ-TV is one of five local Spokane area television stations seen in Canada on the Shaw Direct satellite service. It can also be seen on local cable systems in eastern British Columbia.

KHQ-TV also handles master control and some internal operations for sister stations and fellow NBC affiliates KNDO and KNDU in the Yakima–Tri-Cities market.

== History ==
While KHQ and KXLY were both granted authorization by the Federal Communications Commission (FCC) to build television stations on July 12, 1952, KHQ was first to go on the air on December 8, 1952, broadcasting a test pattern, and on December 15, for one day programming. The station officially went on the air live at 6 p.m. on Saturday, December 20, 1952, with the film Texas Trouble Shooters. The first NBC program KHQ broadcast was an episode of Your Hit Parade, which aired that evening at 7:30. In addition to being the oldest television station in the state east of the Cascades, KHQ is also the second-oldest station in Washington state. It was co-owned by Cowles Publishing along with KHQ radio (AM 590, now KQNT; and FM 98.1, now KISC). The radio stations were both sold off in 1985.

It was originally a dual NBC/ABC affiliate. KREM-TV took the ABC affiliation when it signed on the air in 1954, but KHQ kept the NBC affiliation, which it retains to this day. It is the only major station in Spokane, and one of a few in the country, that has retained the same primary affiliation, owner, and call letters throughout its history.

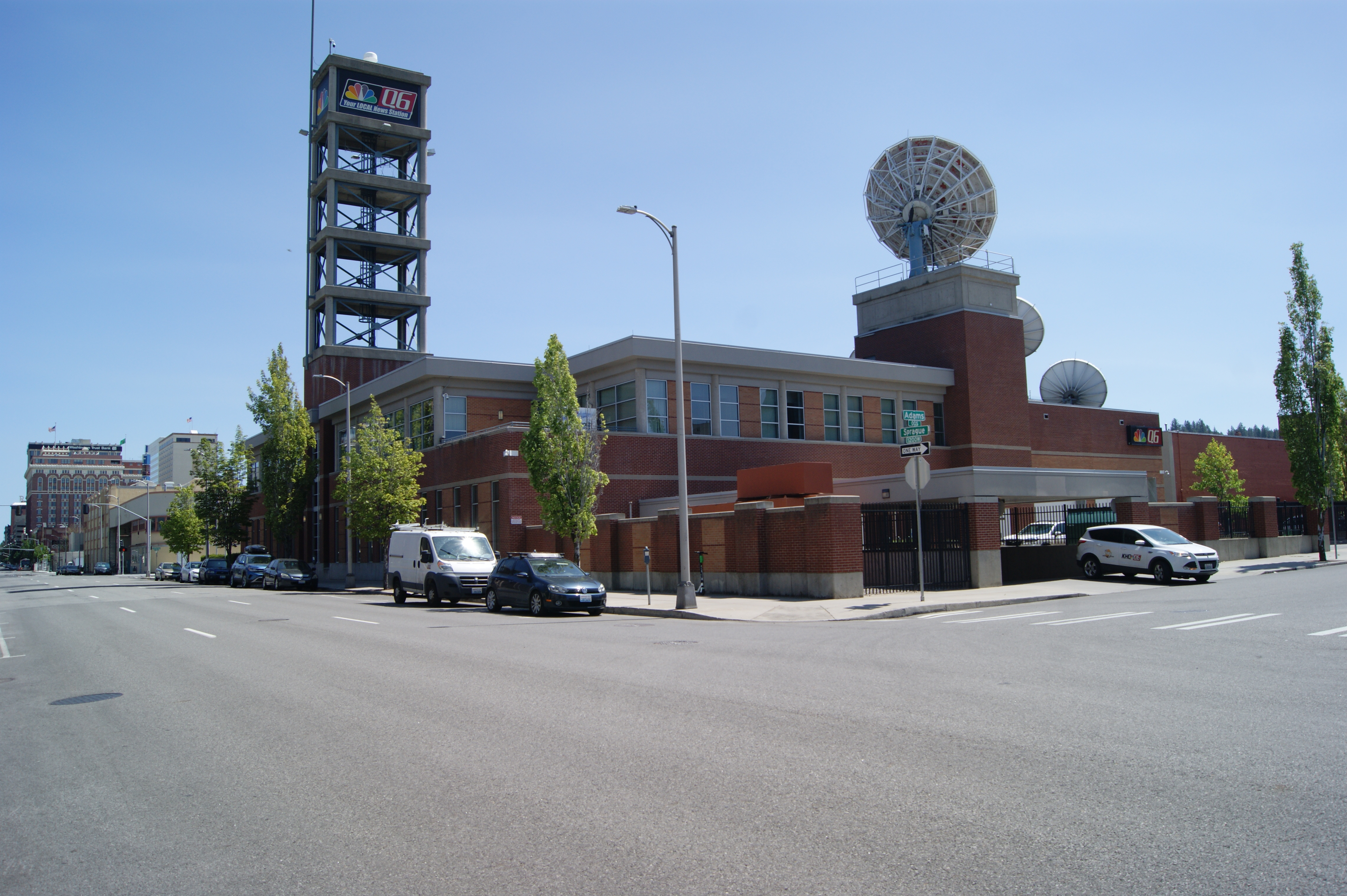
KHQ broadcast studio

After being in its original studio for over forty years, KHQ moved to a new all-digital facility at 1201 W. Sprague Avenue in Downtown Spokane in 2001.

Final "Q6" logo, used until October 2022

Traditionally, KHQ has been colloquially known on-air as "Q6" since the 1960s, but the station switched to call letter branding from around 2005 to 2018, albeit retaining the "Q6" within its logo. On September 24, 2018, coinciding with the introduction of new newscast graphics, the "Q6" branding was restored full-time to the station's newscasts, which were rebranded "Q6 Local News – Right Now." In October 2022, KHQ's news programming was rebranded as NonStop Local, as part of a group-wide rebranding.

== Programming ==
=== Sports programming ===
KHQ-TV has been the local home of Gonzaga Bulldogs men's basketball games since 2001. KHQ-TV and Root Sports Northwest simulcast all games not covered by either the West Coast Conference's television contract with ESPN or that of an inter-conference opponent.

=== News operation ===
In 2006, KXLY became the first Spokane station to produce a local segment of the news in HD. Each week, one news story was presented in high definition. Until 2008, KXLY was the only news station in Spokane to produce a segment of the news in HD.

On May 16, 2008, KHQ produced a live report in HD. It was officially announced on this date that KHQ planned to become the first station in Spokane to broadcast its entire newscasts in HD, starting on August 8, 2008, to coincide with the 2008 Summer Olympics on NBC. However, KXLY made a surprise announcement on August 1, that it would beat KHQ in becoming the first station in Spokane to produce HD newscasts. KXLY's HD newscasts started August 3, five days before KHQ's scheduled date. Despite marketing their newscasts as being in HD, KHQ did not yet present its newscasts in true high definition, but standard definition widescreen. However, with the implementation of a new master control hub (which handles the operations of KHQ, along with sister stations KNDU and KNDO and its SWX channels) using fiberoptic links, and the purchase of new studio equipment and cameras, KHQ migrated to full HD newscasts in late 2012.

In 2008, KHQ and Northern Quest Resort & Casino started a partnership and created SWX, a 24-hour sports and weather channel. SWX soft-launched in January 2009, and officially launched on August 30, 2009.

Unlike most NBC affiliates, the station does not air a noon newscast.

==== Notable former on-air staff ====
- Peter Alexander – anchor and reporter, 1998–2000
- Cindy Brunson – sportscaster, late 1990s
- Ana Cabrera (2005–2009)
- Christine Clayburg (1998–2000)
- Penny Daniels – anchor, 1998–2000
- Ira Joe Fisher (1970–1980)
- Phil Keating (1991–1993)
- Alex Rozier (2011–2014)

== Technical information ==
=== Subchannels ===
The station's signal is multiplexed:

Subchannels of KHQ-TV
| Subchannel | Res. | Short name | Programming |
|---|---|---|---|
| 6.1 | 1080i | KHQ-HD | NBC |
| 6.2 | 480i | KHQSWX | SWX Right Now |
| 6.3 | 480i | KHQNEWS | NonStop Local News |

=== Analog-to-digital conversion ===
KHQ-TV discontinued regular programming on its analog signal, over VHF channel 6, on February 17, 2009, the original target date on which full-power television stations in the United States were to transition from analog to digital broadcasts under federal mandate (which was later pushed back to June 12, 2009). The station's digital signal remained on its pre-transition UHF channel 15 due to adjacent channel interference with KSPS (now on channel 8). Digital television receivers display KHQ-TV's virtual channel as its former VHF analog channel 6.

=== Translators ===
- K03IN-D Leavenworth
- K08AY-D Winthrop–Twisp
- K09BI-D Methow
- K10AP-D Brewster & Pateros
- K11DL-D Juliaetta, ID
- K12LF-D Coolin, ID
- K12LV-D Dryden
- K13KV-D Troy, MT
- K16NR-D Coeur d'Alene, ID
- K21LD-D Mazama
- K21NG-D Sandpoint, ID
- K22JF-D Wenatchee
- K35BW-D Lewiston, ID

== See also ==
- List of three-letter broadcast call signs in the United States
