= U.S. Route 93 in Arizona =

Highway in Arizona

U.S. Route 93
- US 93 highlighted in red US 93 Spur in blue

Route information
- Maintained by ADOT
- Length: 199.38 mi (320.87 km) Includes I-40 overlap of 22.83 miles (36.74 km)
- Existed: June 17, 1935–present
- History: 1935: Extended to Kingman with US 466; 1965: Extended to US 89 at Congress Junction; 1992: Extended to Wickenburg
- Tourist routes: Joshua Forest Scenic Road

Major junctions
- South end: US 60 in Wickenburg
- I-40 in Kingman
- North end: I-11 / US 93 at the Nevada state line near Boulder City, NV

Location
- Country: United States
- State: Arizona
- Counties: Maricopa, Yavapai, Mohave

Highway system
- United States Numbered Highway System; List; Special; Divided; Arizona State Highway System; Interstate; US; State; Scenic Proposed; Former
← SR 92	US 93	→ SR 93
← SR 464	US 466	→ SR 473

U.S. Route 93 (US 93) is a United States Numbered Highway in the state of Arizona that begins in Wickenburg and heads north to the Nevada state line at the Mike O'Callaghan–Pat Tillman Memorial Bridge. The total length of US 93 in Arizona is 199.38 miles (320.87 kilometres). Between Wickenburg and Interstate 40 (I-40), part of US 93 is designated as the Joshua Forest Scenic Byway. While most of US 93 is a four-lane divided highway, sections of the highway between Wickenburg and I-40 are still narrow two-lane roads, gradually being upgraded to match the rest of the route. As part of a proposal by municipal leaders in Nevada and Arizona, the highway could be replaced by Interstate 11 (I-11).

Most of US 93 from Hoover Dam to Kingman was originally designated as State Route 69 (SR 69) and was later re-designated as the easternmost part of US 466 in 1935. US 93 was extended into Arizona along US 466 to Kingman the same year. Until 1965, the route from US 89 (now SR 89) in Wickenburg to Kingman was designated as SR 93. The remainder of the route to US 60 Wickenburg was part of US 89 until the designation was truncated to Flagstaff, Arizona 1992. US 93 was extended over the former route of US 89, to its current terminus at US 60.

== Route description ==
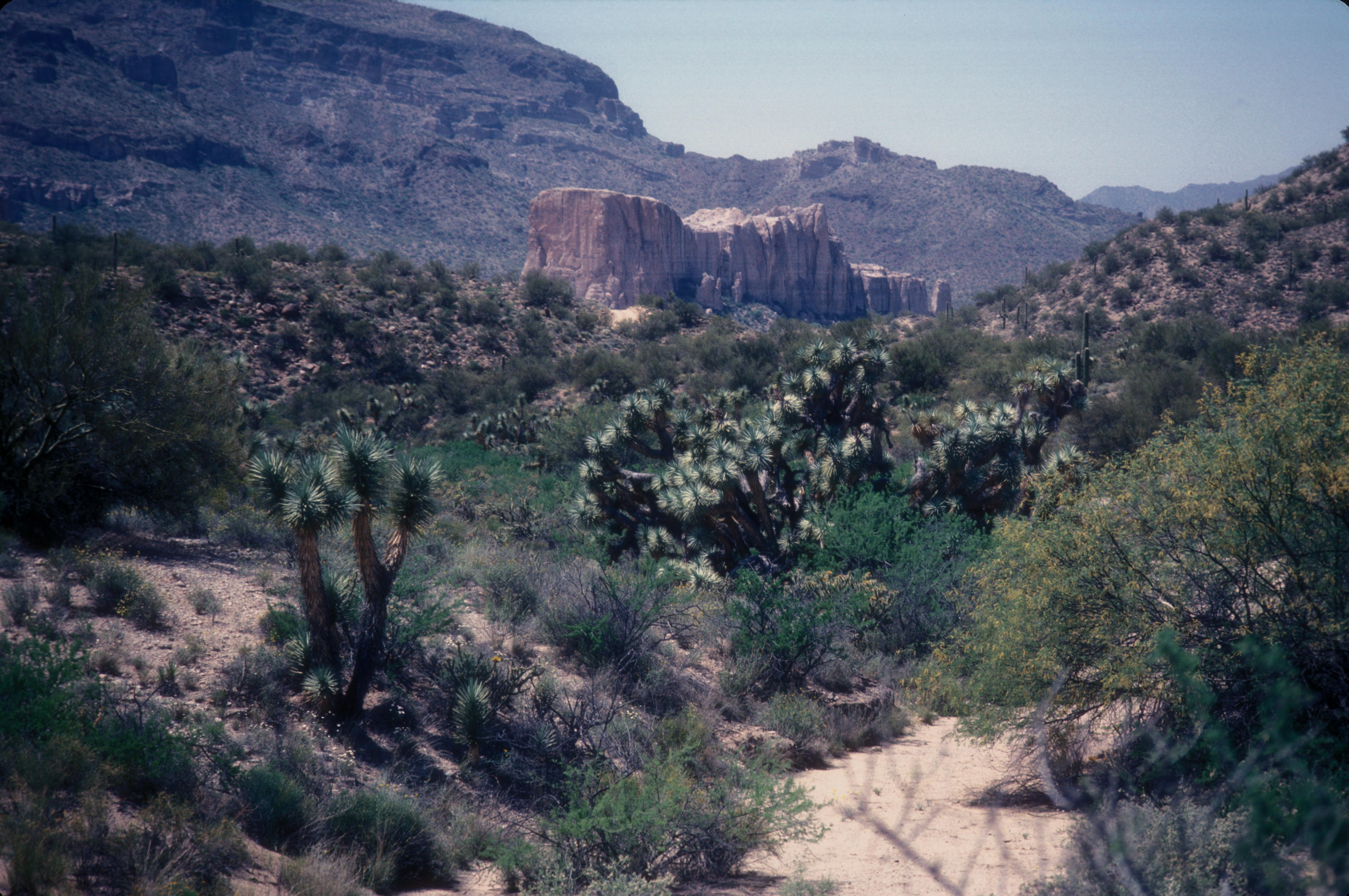
Joshua Forest Parkway in Yavapai County northwest of Wickenburg as seen in 2007

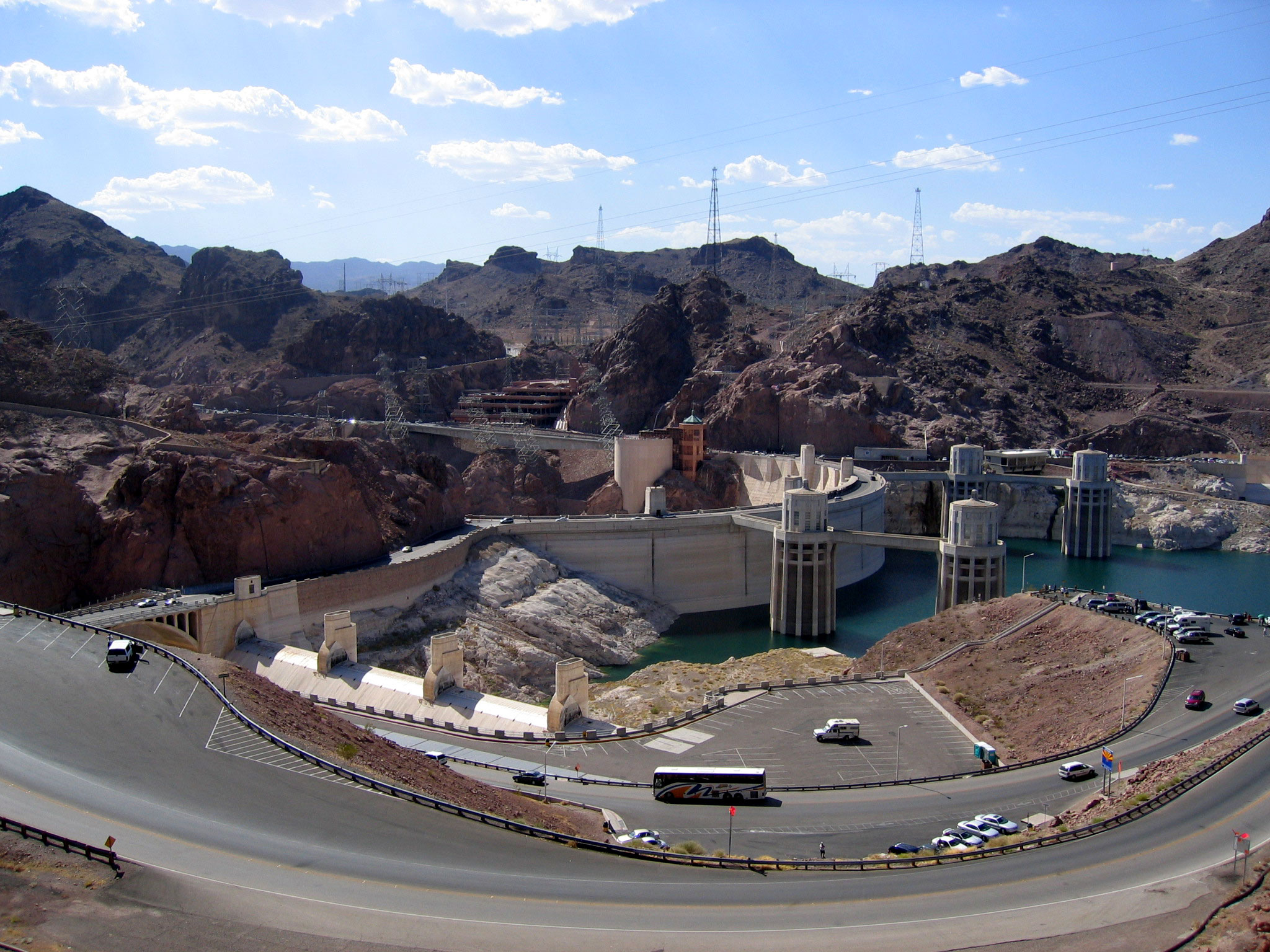
Looking north above old US 93 as it crosses over Hoover Dam into Nevada as seen in 2005

The southern terminus of US 93 is located at a junction (rebuilt and relocated between February 2008 and February 2010) with US 60 in Wickenburg, a small town about 50 miles (80 km) northwest of Phoenix. It heads northwest from this junction to an intersection with SR 89 (former US 89) across the Maricopa – Yavapai county line just northwest of town. SR 89 heads northeast to Prescott, while US 93 continues its northwesterly heading, as a mainly two-lane highway with passing lanes every few miles. US 93 continues to the northwest to a junction with SR 71 at a diamond interchange southwest of Congress. As it continues to the northwest through this scenic but remote rural area, the highway is signed as the Joshua Forest Parkway.

The highway widens to four lanes at the Santa Maria River and continues towards the northwest past a junction with SR 97 on its way to the town of Wikieup. Before reaching that town, it passes the tiny settlement of Nothing (just across the Yavapai – Mohave county line) and crosses Burro Creek over dual steel arch bridges, which are located about 400 feet (120 metres) above the intermittent waterway.

After passing through Wikieup, US 93 curves north to follow the western edge of the Big Sandy River and one of its tributaries, Knight Creek, on its way toward Interstate 40 (I-40).

At I-40's exit 71, US 93 merges with the Interstate freeway and shares the same alignment heading west until they reach Kingman. The two split in Kingman, with I-40 heading towards the south to skirt the southern end of the Black Mountains before curving west and into California and US 93 heading northwest towards Las Vegas. As of September 2026, a project is underway to design and build a free-flowing connection between I-40 and US 93 in the western section of Kingman, to avoid the current diamond interchange (exit 48) at Beale Street and the approximately one-mile section of congested, undivided roadway that US 93 motorists must navigate before the road widens back into a four-lane divided facility.

Northwest of Kingman and just over Coyote Pass, US 93 has an interchange with SR 68 (exit 67). This junction incorporates a large Commercial Vehicle Inspection Station (CVIS), which ADOT calls a "Port of Entry" (POE), for southbound and eastbound commercial traffic. SR 68 heads west over the Black Mountains to Davis Dam, Laughlin, and Bullhead City (the latter via SR 95), while US 93 continues as a four-lane divided route towards the northwest. Running through the long Detrital Valley, with the Black Mountains to the west and the Cerbat Mountains and then the White Hills to the east, US 93 passes several small settlements in this most remote area. As it nears the Nevada state line, it enters the Lake Mead National Recreation Area and climbs over Householder Pass, before crossing into Nevada via the Mike O'Callaghan–Pat Tillman Memorial Bridge over the Black Canyon just downstream of the Colorado River from Hoover Dam.

US 93 continues into Nevada to the cities of Boulder City, Henderson, and Las Vegas as part of Interstate 11 (I-11) and as US 93 north of them.

== History ==
=== Route's creation and failed quest for the border ===
State Route 69
- Location: Hoover Dam to Kingman
- Length: 72.59 mi (116.82 km)
- Existed: June 18, 1934–May 16, 1935

U.S. Route 466
- Location: Hoover Dam to Kingman
- Length: 72.59 mi (116.82 km)
- Existed: May 16, 1935–December 3, 1971

The route between Kingman and Hoover Dam first became part of the state highway system on June 18, 1934, when it was designated as SR 69. At the time, Hoover Dam was still under construction and the highway did not link to Nevada. The dam was completed the following year in 1935 enabling traffic to cross over the top of the dam. In that year, U.S. Route 466 (US 466) was designated over SR 69 from Kingman to Hoover Dam. US 93 was extended south from (then) US 91 at Glendale, Nevada later the same year. Although the US 466 designation had been approved by the American Association of State Highway Officials (AASHO) from Glendale to Kingman on October 9, 1933, the Arizona State Highway Department had waited until May 16, 1935, before retiring SR 69 and re-designating it as US 466. US 466 was joined by US 93 on June 17, 1935, after AASHO approved an extension of the latter route from US 91 north of Las Vegas, Nevada to Kingman.

Directional colored shields found on US 93 during the 1950s.

In 1935, Arizona proposed an extension of US 93 from Kingman to Ash Fork, overlapping US 66, and then south to Phoenix. This proposal was protested by the towns of Aguila and Wickenburg that argued that US 93 should pass through their towns rather than the proposed alignment to the east. The town of Wickenburg contested that a direct routing between Phoenix and Kingman would be 100 miles (161 km) shorter than the routing through Ash Fork and that it would provide a necessary connection between Phoenix, the state capital and the northwestern part of the state. Until 1937, the originally proposed extension overlapping US 66 stayed in planning as US 93T. Another route, US 193, was also planned, traveling from Phoenix through Sacaton and Casa Grande before terminating in Picacho. US 193 was briefly reworked under the designation US 93A before the proposal was abandoned in 1937.

On March 23, 1946, what would become the southern leg of US 93 past Kingman was added to the State Highway System as State Route 93. Between 1942 and 1958, the highway was rebuilt and reworked into a suitable highway for an eventual extension of US 93. Though the state wanted US 93 to be extended over all of SR 93 through Phoenix, Casa Grande and Tucson to the Mexico border in Nogales, a southern extension was only accepted by the AASHTO to US 89 north of Wickenburg in 1965. The rest of SR 93 kept its state route designation until 1984. On December 3, 1971, the entirety of US 466 was decommissioned, upon request by the states of Arizona and Nevada. This left US 93 as the sole designation between Kingman and Las Vegas.

Until 1992, US 93 ended a short distance north of Wickenburg, Arizona at a junction with U.S. Route 89. When US 89 was decommissioned in the area, the US 93 designation was carried on into Wickenburg.

=== Mike O'Callaghan–Pat Tillman Memorial Bridge ===
In 2005, construction started on a new route across the Colorado River called the Hoover Dam Bypass. The new crossing is the Mike O'Callaghan–Pat Tillman Memorial Bridge, the first so-called concrete-steel composite arch bridge built in the United States. The bridge is 1,900 feet (579 m) with a 1,080-foot (329 m) main span. The roadway is 840 feet (256 m) above the Colorado River. It opened to traffic in 2010.

The bypass replaced the old section of US 93 that approached and crossed directly over Hoover Dam, which was inadequate by modern standards because there was one narrow lane in each direction, including several hairpin turns, many dangerous curves, and poor sight distances. Also, in the wake of the September 11, 2001 attacks, truck traffic over the Hoover Dam had been diverted south to a river crossing near Laughlin, Nevada via State Route 68, State Route 163 in Nevada and US 95, to safeguard the dam from hazardous spills or explosions. The northernmost portions of it became part of the Hoover Dam National Landmark. The rest is still owned by ADOT but has been closed to vehicular traffic and redesignated as SR 93X.

=== 21st-century improvements ===
Starting in 2006, several widening projects were completed on the section between Wickenburg and Interstate 40, with the ultimate goal of improving the entire route to a four-lane divided highway.

In 2010, the "Interim Wickenburg Bypass" was completed, re-aligning US 93 to the east of the downtown, and constructing two roundabouts and a bridge to relieve congestion in the area. In 2024, an additional four roundabouts in the town were constructed, extending the so-called bypass north.

In 2024, construction started on a direct system interchange with I-40 in western Kingman to eliminate the current bottleneck at Beale Street. It is expected to be finished in 2027.

== Future ==
Future Interstate 11
- Location: Nogales – Nevada state line
- Length: 469 mi (755 km)

US 93 (with US 60 to the southeast of Wickenburg) is the shortest route between the fast-growing cities of Las Vegas and Phoenix, two of the largest cities in the Southwest, and is an officially designated portion of the CANAMEX Corridor. While the bulk of US 93 through Arizona has been widened to four lanes, some portions of the corridor are not built to Interstate Highway standards, as there are scattered at-grade intersections, substandard roadway and shoulder widths, median crossovers, and other deficiencies. Part of these dual roadways are repaved, restriped sections of very old parts of US 93. This routing is part of Interstate 11 (I-11), which includes the former Interstate 515 (I-515) and runs concurrent with U.S. Route 95 (US 95) throughout Las Vegas, Nevada. Future plans for the extension of I-11 call for the route to continue following US 93 all the way to its southern terminus in Wickenburg, Arizona. Phase 4 of the US 93 Corridor Improvement Project will finish what was started in 1998 and connect the four sections of the divided highway to Wickenburg, allowing more traffic on these congested roads. US 93 will be co-signed as I-11 once it is built to Interstate standards. US 93 from its southern terminus to north of Las Vegas will most likely be decommissioned afterwards.

Although seen as beneficial to some people, the controversial plan to build I-11 in Arizona as a whole is still receiving fierce pushback, and conservation groups are currently suing both ADOT and FHWA over the construction of that route. In 2025, planning for the freeway bypass from I-19 in Sahuarita to US 93 in Wickenburg was stopped per court order.

== Junction list ==
Mileposts start at the Nevada state line and are based on the mileposts of former SR 69 and US 466.

County	Location	mi	km	Exit	Destinations	Notes
Maricopa	Wickenburg	199.38	320.87		US 60 (Wickenburg Way) – Phoenix, Wickenburg, Los Angeles	Southern terminus; US 60 east was formerly part of US 89 south/SR 93 south; roundabout
Yavapai	Wickenburg	193.36	311.18		SR 89 north / Matthie Ranch Road – Congress, Prescott	Southern terminus of SR 89; former northern terminus of SR 93; former US 89 north
Yavapai	Congress	182.66	293.96		SR 71 – Prescott, Los Angeles	Interchange
Mohave	Nothing	155.01	249.46		SR 97 north – Bagdad, Hillside	Southern terminus of SR 97
Mohave	Kingman	92.72– 92.44	149.22– 148.77		I-40 east – Flagstaff	Southern end of I-40 concurrency; I-40 exit 71
Mohave	Kingman	66.02	106.25	66	Blake Ranch Road	Exit numbers and mile markers based on I-40 throughout concurrency
Mohave	Kingman	59.21	95.29	59	CR 259 (DW Ranch Road)	
Mohave	Kingman	56.00	90.12	56	Flying Fortress Parkway – Kingman Airport	Interchange opened on October 5, 2026
Mohave	Kingman	53.07	85.41	53	SR 66 / Historic US 66 (Andy Devine Avenue) – Kingman Airport	Former BL 40 west/US 66
Mohave	Kingman	51.69	83.19	51	Stockton Hill Road	
Mohave	Kingman	69.85– 69.77	112.41– 112.28		I-40 west to Historic US 66 / Beale Street – Los Angeles	Northern end of I-40 concurrency; Beale Street was formerly part of BL 40 east/US 466; I-40 exit 48; to be replaced by semi-directional T interchange 1/2 mile (800 m) north of current interchange (northbound left exit and southbound left entrance)
Mohave	Kingman	69.00	111.04	69	Beale Street to I-40 west – Los Angeles	Interchange under construction; southbound exit and northbound entrance; I-40 exit 49
Mohave	Golden Valley	65.79	105.88	67	SR 68 west – Bullhead City, Laughlin	Interchange; eastern terminus of SR 68
Mohave	Dolan Springs	41.8	67.3	41	Pierce Ferry Road – Meadview	Proposed interchange
Mohave	Lake Mead NRA	3.30	5.31		White Rock Canyon Trailhead Access	Southern end of freeway; at-grade intersection
Mohave	Lake Mead NRA	0.66	1.06	2	Kingman Wash Access Road (SR 93X)	No direct access to the Hoover Dam and Nevada
Colorado River		0.00	0.00	Mike O'Callaghan–Pat Tillman Memorial Bridge		
Colorado River		0.00	0.00		I-11 north / US 93 north – Las Vegas	Continuation into Nevada; southern terminus of I-11
1.000 mi = 1.609 km; 1.000 km = 0.621 mi: Concurrency terminus; Unopened

== Special routes ==
US 93 has an unsigned special route within the state of Arizona.

- U.S. Route 93 Spur (Kingman, Arizona)

U.S. Route 93
Previous state: Terminus	Arizona	Next state: Nevada

U.S. Route 466
Previous state: Nevada	Arizona	Next state: Terminus
