= Anything =

Anything may refer to:

== Albums ==
- Anything (The Cranberry Saw Us demo), by the band later named the Cranberries, 1990
- Anything (The Damned album) or the title song (see below), 1986
- Anything (Kinnie Starr album) or the title song, 2006
- Anything (Martina Topley-Bird album), the US version of Quixotic, or the title song, 2003

== Songs ==
- "Anything" (3T song), 1995
- "Anything" (The Calling song), 2004
- "Anything" (Culture Beat song), 1993
- "Anything" (Damage song), 1996
- "Anything" (The Damned song), 1986
- "Anything" (Edyta Górniak song), 1998
- "Anything" (Eric Burdon and the Animals song), 1967
- "Anything" (Hedley song), 2013
- "Anything" (Jay-Z song), 2000 (for the 2006 song, see below)
- "Anything" (JoJo song), 2007
- "Anything" (SWV song), 1994
- "Anything (To Find You)", by Monica, 2011
- "Anything, Anything (I'll Give You)", by Dramarama, 1985
- "Anything", by Adrianne Lenker from Songs, 2020
- "Anything", by An Endless Sporadic playable in Guitar Hero: World Tour and Guitar Hero 5, 2008
- "Anything", by Jaheim from Ghetto Love, 2001
- "Anything", by Jay-Z from Kingdom Come, 2006
- "Anything", by Keke Wyatt from Rated Love, 2016
- "Anything", by Man Overboard from Heavy Love, 2015
- "Anything", by the Mothers of Invention from Cruising with Ruben & the Jets, 1968
- "Anything", by Plain White T's from All That We Needed, 2005
- "Anything", by Savage from Moonshine, 2005
- "Anything", by SZA from Ctrl, 2017
- "Anything", by Third Eye Blind from Blue, 1999
- "Anything", by Tim Skold from Skold, 1996

== Other uses ==
- Anything (film), a 2017 American film directed by Timothy McNeil
- anything, an English indefinite pronoun

== See also ==
- N.E. Thing Co., a Canadian art collective 1967–1978
- Top type, in type theory and computer programming, the type of which every possible data object is an example
- Something (disambiguation)
- Nothing (disambiguation)
- Everything (disambiguation)
