= SAE J2807 =

Standard for the towing capacity of passenger vehicles

SAE J2807 is an SAE standard for determining the towing capacity of passenger cars, multipurpose passenger vehicles, and trucks. It was written to allow consumers to more accurately compare vehicles from different manufacturers. First released in 2008, it has been periodically updated, with the 2020 version being the most current.

== Forward ==
"Light truck, minivan, sport utility, and crossover vehicles represent a significant portion of the North American vehicle mix, and trailering usage of these vehicles has increased. Heavier-duty models, approaching medium-duty trucks and often intended for trailering, have become more popular as well. Some passenger cars are also rated to tow trailers. For many vehicles, trailer weight rating may be a major marketing point.

As trailer weight ratings have increased, engine characteristics like horsepower and torque, thermal performance and driveline durability are no longer the only significant factors in determining trailering capability. Combination vehicle dynamics and tow-vehicle hitch/attachment structure have gained in significance.

This document defines procedures and requirements to determine Gross Combination Weight Rating (GCWR) and calculate corresponding Trailer Weight Rating (TWR) for any tow vehicle. These procedures will establish consistent rating requirements and processes so end users (customers) can reasonably compare similar class models in terms of trailering ability."

== Tests ==
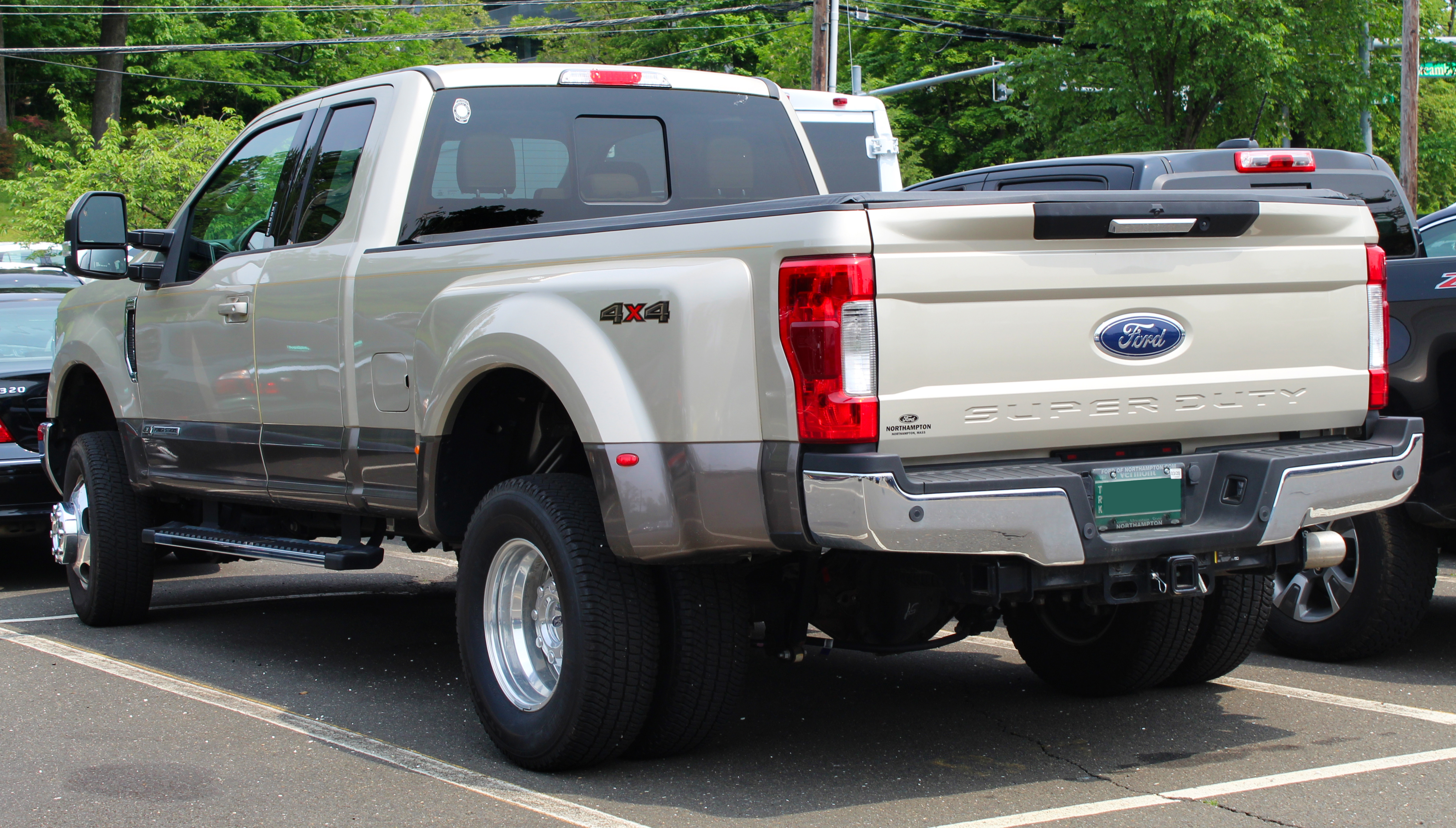
A Ford F-350 with dual rear wheels (a "dually")

The standard documents a set of tests a tow vehicle must pass with a specific weight to claim the capability to claim that trailer rating. Different criteria are specified for single rear wheel (SRW) and dual rear wheel (DRW) vehicles. The Davis Dam test requires the vehicle to climb the grade on Route 68 between Bullhead City and Golden Valley, Arizona, a climb of 3,500 ft (1,100 m) in 11 miles (18 km), starting at 100 °F (38 °C), with the air-conditioning on full.

SAE J2807 Tests
Test	SRW	DRW
Davis Dam	>=40 mph	>= 35 mph
Go 5 meters from stop on 12% grade, 5 times in a row	<= 5 minutes	<= 5 minutes
Hold full rig with just parking brake	12% grade	12% grade
0 - 30 mph(level ground)	<-= 12 sec	<= 14 sec
0 - 60 mph(level ground)	<= 30 sec	<= 35 sec
40 -60 mph (level ground): passing test	<= 18 sec	<= 21 sec
20 mph to stop with trailer brakes active, staying in 11.5 feet lane, trailer lighter than tow vehicle	<= 35 ft	<= 35 ft
20 mph to stop with trailer brakes active, staying in 11.5 feet lane, trailer heavier than tow vehicle	<= 45 ft	<= 45 ft
20 mph to stop without trailer brakes, staying in 11.5 feet lane, trailer lighter than tow vehicle	<= 80 ft	<= 80 ft
understeer test: increases from 0.1 g to 0.3 g n 300 ft circle	pass	pass
sway test, 62 mph	>= 1.0 damping ratio	>=1.0 damping ratio
