= Something Else =

Something Else or Somethin' Else may refer to:

== Music ==
=== Performers ===
- Something Else (Japanese band), a folk band
- Somethin' Else!, an American band featuring Bobby Cochran
- Something Else, a 1970s Scottish band featuring Sheena Easton

=== Albums ===
- Something Else!!!!, by Ornette Coleman, 1958
- Something Else (The Brian Jonestown Massacre album), 2018
- Somethin' Else (Cannonball Adderley album), or the title song, written by Miles Davis, 1958
- Something Else (The Cranberries album), 2017
- Somethin' Else (The Kingston Trio album), 1965
- Something Else (Robin Thicke album), 2008
- Something Else (Shirley Bassey album), 1971
- Something Else (Tech N9ne album), 2013
- Something Else by the Kinks, 1967
- Something Else from The Move, 1968
- Something Else, by EL, 2012

=== Songs ===
- "Somethin' Else" (song), by Eddie Cochran, 1959
- "Something Else", the first section of the Pink Floyd song "A Saucerful of Secrets (instrumental)", 1968
- "Something Else", by Brock Phillips, 2025
- "Something Else", by Diamond Rings from Special Affections, 2010
- "Something Else", by the Doubleclicks from Lasers and Feelings, 2013
- "Something Else", by Gary Jules from Trading Snakeoil for Wolftickets, 2001
- "Something Else", by Good Charlotte from Good Morning Revival, 2007

== Television ==
- Something Else (TV series), a 1978–1982 British youth-aimed programme
- Something Else, a 1970–1971 American musical variety show hosted by John Byner

== Other uses ==
- Something Else (book), a 1994 children's book by Kathryn Cave
- Somethin' Else (content agency), a British multi-platform content company
- Something Else Press, an American small-press publisher

== See also ==
- Something (disambiguation)
