= Special routes of U.S. Route 93 =

Highway system

Special routes of U.S. Route 93

Highway system
- United States Numbered Highway System; List; Special; Divided

Several special routes of U.S. Route 93 exist. In order from south to north they are as follows. US 93 has two special routes within the state of Arizona.

== Hoover Dam temporary route ==
State Route 93X
- Location: Lake Mead NRA
- Length: 2.13 mi (3.43 km)
- Existed: January 1, 2011–present

State Route 93 Temporary (SR 93T or SR 93X) is an unsigned 2.13-mile (3.43 km) long state highway near the Hoover Dam in Mohave County. The route was originally part of the US 93 segment that travelled over Hoover Dam. It was redesignated as SR 93X on January 1, 2011, following the completion of the Hoover Dam Bypass. Unlike most unrelinquished sections of U.S. Highways in Arizona, the old Hoover Dam route was given a state route designation instead of a U.S. Highway one. SR 93X is not related in any way to SR 93, which was the original designation of US 93 between Kingman and Wickenburg, as well as a failed extension of US 93 from Wickenburg to Nogales. The route begins at the Nevada state line on the Hoover Dam, heading southeast, before switch-backing up a hillside at the southeastern end of the dam. ADOT ownership of SR 93X begins exactly 1-mile (1.6 km) southeast of the Hoover Dam on Kingman Wash Access Road near the Arizona side Hoover Dam Lookout. The route proceeds southeasterly along Kingman Wash Access Road, crossing under US 93 less than a mile from the lookout. Approximately 2.13 miles (3.43 km) from its western terminus, SR 93X arrives at a freeway interchange with US 93, which also serves as its eastern terminus. Currently, the majority of SR 93X is gated off to public traffic. The western first 1.01 miles (1.63 km) of the route and Arizona side of the Hoover Dam are still accessible to public traffic, but can only be reached via US 93, I-11, SR 172 and Hoover Dam Access Road through Nevada. There is currently no open road for bicycles, pedestrians and vehicles to leave the Arizona side of the Dam, whilst remaining in the state.

Major intersections
The entire route is in Mohave County.

Location	mi	km	Destinations	Notes
Colorado River	0.00	0.00	Hoover Dam Access Road to SR 172 west	Continuation into Nevada; former US 93 north / US 466 west
Colorado River	0.00	0.00	Hoover Dam	
Lake Mead NRA	1.01	1.63	Beginning of ADOT ownership	
Lake Mead NRA	2.05– 2.13	3.30– 3.43	Future I-11 / US 93 – Hoover Dam, Las Vegas, Kingman	Eastern terminus; US 93 exit 2; former US 466 east
1.000 mi = 1.609 km; 1.000 km = 0.621 mi

== Kingman spur route ==
U.S. Route 93 Spur
- Location: Kingman
- Length: 0.38 mi (610 m)
- Existed: September 18, 2009–present

U.S. Route 93 Spur (US 93 Spur) is a 0.38-mile (0.61 km) long unsigned spur route of US 93 in Kingman. Originally a small section of US 66, it became part of the Kingman I-40 Business Loop (I-40 BL) on October 26, 1984, upon the decommissioning of the former highway in Arizona. The majority of I-40 BL was retired to the city of Kingman in 2002, with two sections, each less than a mile long, remaining under ADOT ownership at I-40 exits 48 and 53 respectively. On September 18, 2009, the I-40 BL designation was decommissioned. The two remaining segments owned by ADOT became a minor southwestern extension of SR 66 and a new route designated US 93 Spur. US 93 Spur begins at an intersection with I-40 and US 93, at Beale Street and I-40 exit 48. The unsigned spur route continues east on Beale Street, ending about three blocks east of I-40 and US 93, at an intersection with Ella's Place, Grandview Avenue, and Beale Street in front of Locomotive Park.

Major intersections
The entire route is in Kingman, Mohave County.

mi	km	Destinations	Notes
71.04– 71.13	114.33– 114.47	I-40 / US 93 (Beale Street) – Los Angeles, Flagstaff, Phoenix, Las Vegas	Western terminus; I-40 exit 48; former US 466 west
71.33	114.79	Grandview Avenue / Beale Street / Route 66 to Historic US 66	Eastern terminus; former BL 40 east / US 466 east
1.000 mi = 1.609 km; 1.000 km = 0.621 mi

== Boulder City business ==
U.S. Route 93 Business
- Location: Boulder City, Nevada
- Existed: 2019–present

U.S. Route 93 Business (US 93 Bus.) is a business route of US 93 in Clark County, Nevada. The route provides access to Lake Mead and downtown Boulder City from Interstate 11 (I-11). The route was originally part of mainline US 93 before it was realigned around Boulder City along I-11.

== Lages Junction–Wells alternate ==
U.S. Route 93 Alternate
- Location: Lages Station–Wells, Nevada

U.S. Route 93 Alternate (US 93 ALT) is an alternate route of US 93 in northeastern Nevada. The southern terminus is at Lages Station in northern White Pine County, where it separates from US 93. The route continues north to West Wendover where it joins Interstate 80 (I-80). US 93 ALT follows I-80 west to Wells, where it terminates at an interchange with US 93.

US 93 ALT provides a shortcut from central Nevada to Salt Lake City, Utah via eastbound I-80.

== Twin Falls business ==
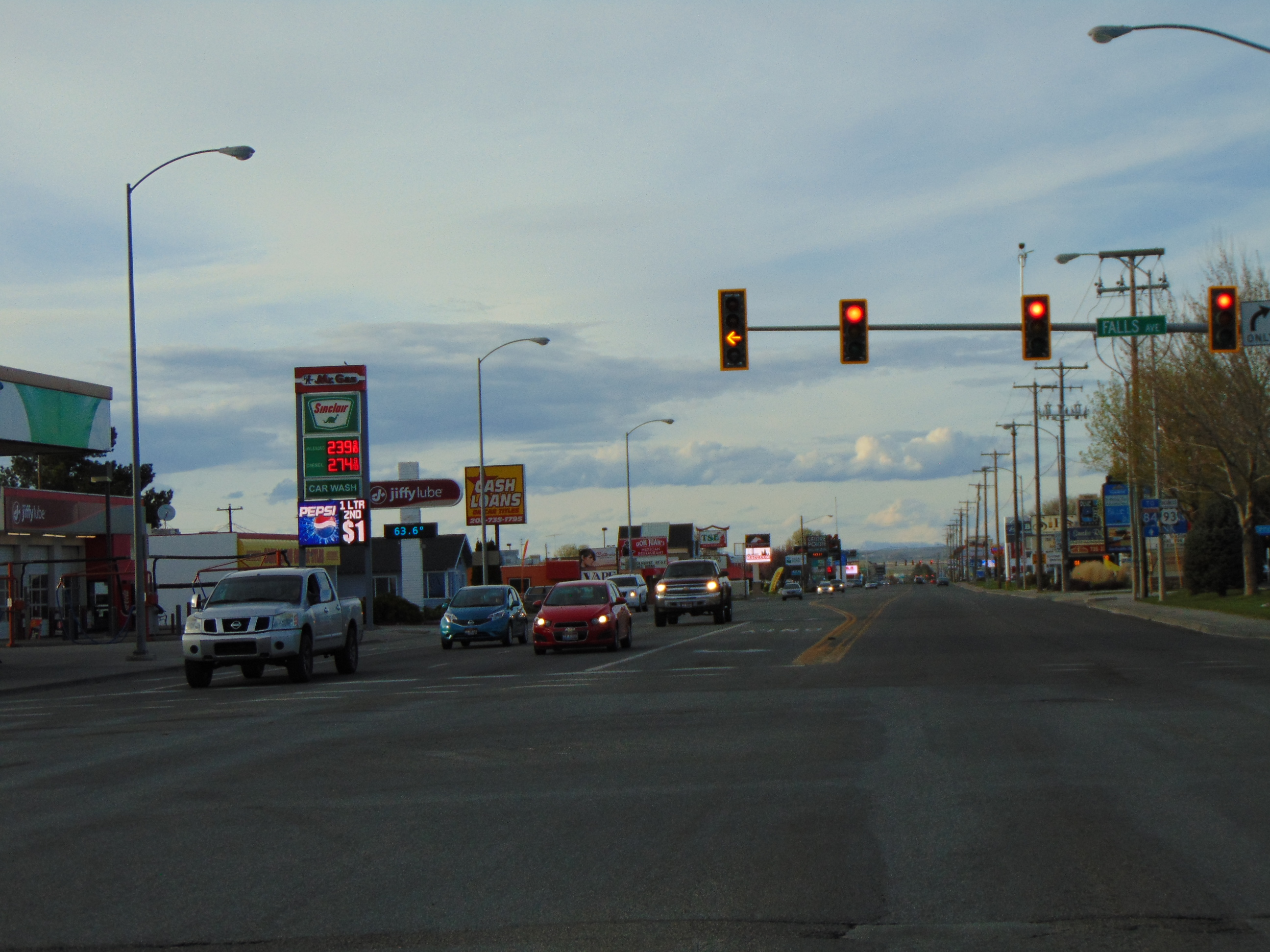
North on US 93 Bus (Blue Lakes Boulevard) in Twin Falls, April 2017

U.S. Highway 93 Business
- Location: Twin Falls, Idaho
- Length: 8.110 mi (13.052 km)

U.S. Route 93 Business (US 93 Bus.) is a 8.110-mile (13.052 km) business route of US 93 in Twin Falls County, Idaho. The route provides access to downtown Twin Falls. A majority of the route is concurrent with U.S. Route 30. The route was originally part of mainline US 93 before it was realigned around most of Twin Falls.

== Shoshone–Challis alternate ==
U.S. Highway 93 Alternate
- Location: Shoshone–Challis, Idaho
- Existed: 1926–1977

Between 1926 and 1977 a road between Shoshone, Idaho, and Challis, Idaho, was also labeled US 93 Alternate. This stretch of road is now designated as part of US 93. The pre-1977 routing of 93 between those points is now designated as Idaho State Highway 75.

== Missoula business ==
U.S. Highway 93 Business
- Location: Missoula, Montana
- Length: 3.9978 mi (6.4338 km)

U.S. Route 93 Business (US 93 Bus.) is a business route of US 93 in Missoula, Montana. It follows Brooks Street, Stephens Avenue, and Orange Street from US 93 to Interstate 90 Business (I-90 BL or Broadway Street). North of Broadway Street, US 93 Bus. is unsigned to Interstate 90.

Major intersection
The entire route is in Missoula, Missoula County.

mi	km	Destinations	Notes
0.0000	0.0000	US 12 west / US 93 to I-90 (Brooks Street / Reserve Street)	US 93 Bus. southern terminus; southern end of US 12 concurrency
1.6619	2.6746	US 12 east (Brooks Street) / Stephens Avenue	Northern end of US 12 concurrency
3.3000	5.3108	Orange Street Bridge crosses the Clark Fork	
3.4229	5.5086	I-90 BL (Broadway)	To US 93
3.9978	6.4338	I-90 / MT 200 – Coeur d'Alene, Butte	I-90 exit 104; US 93 Bus. northern terminus
1.000 mi = 1.609 km; 1.000 km = 0.621 mi: Concurrency terminus

== Kalispell alternate ==
U.S. Highway 93 Alternate
- Location: Kalispell, Montana
- Length: 7.6098 mi (12.2468 km)

U.S. Route 93 Alternate in Montana is an alternate route of US 93 that bypasses the central business district of the city of Kalispell.
