= Something =

Something may refer to:

== Philosophy and language ==
- Something (concept)
- "Something", an English indefinite pronoun

== Music ==
=== Albums ===
- Something (Chairlift album), 2012
- Something (Shirley Bassey album), 1970
- Something (Shirley Scott album), 1970

=== Songs ===
- "Something" (Beatles song), 1969
- "Something" (Lasgo song), 2001
- "Something" (TVXQ song), 2014
- "Something (To Make You Feel Alright)", by Alex Marsh as Silosonic, 2005
- "Something", by Aerosmith from Music from Another Dimension!, 2012
- "Something", by Andrius Pojavis, representing Lithuania in the Eurovision Song Contest 2013
- "Something", by Dark Lotus from Tales from the Lotus Pod, 2001
- "Something", by Escape the Fate from This War Is Ours, 2008
- "Something", by Girl's Day from Girl's Day Everyday #3, 2014
- "Something", by Gnash, 2016
- "Something", by Guy Sebastian from Conscious, 2017
- "(something)", by the Microphones from It Was Hot, We Stayed in the Water, 2000
- "(something)", by the Microphones from The Glow Pt. 2, 2001
- "(something)", by Mount Eerie from Wind's Poem, 2009
- "Something", by the Move, the B-side of the single "Blackberry Way", 1968
- "Something", by Nayeon from Na, 2024
- "Something", by Nelly Furtado featuring Nas from The Spirit Indestructible, 2012
- "Something", by Shakira from Oral Fixation, Vol. 2, 2005
- "Something", by White Noise Owl from Condition Critical, 2019

== Other uses ==
- Something (film), a 2018 horror film

== See also ==
- "Sumthin", a song by Devo from Something for Everybody
- Some Things, an album by Lasgo
- Anything (disambiguation)
- Everything (disambiguation)
- Nothing (disambiguation)
- Thing (disambiguation)
