= Palm Gardens, Nevada =

Unincorporated community in Clark County, Nevada, United States

Palm Gardens
- Unincorporated community
- Location within Nevada Location within the United States
- Coordinates: 35.198°N 114.858°W
- Country: United States
- State: Nevada
- County: Clark
- Time zone: UTC-8 (Pacific (PST))
  - Summer (DST): UTC-7 (PDT)
- ZIP code: 89039
- Area codes: 702/725

Palm Gardens is an unincorporated community in Clark County, Nevada, United States. It is a small planned community along U.S. Route 95, located roughly 70 miles from downtown Las Vegas and 0.6 miles from the California border.

== History ==
Palm Gardens began development in the 90s and a Chevron gas station with a Chevron Food Mart convenience store was built in 1999. The community was planned to have 90 constructed homes, but further development was delayed due to the Great Recession, the death of a contractor, and environmental concerns regarding desert tortoises in the area.

As of 2021, the community only has 33 built homes and 53 total residential plots. The Chevron convenience store in the community is notable for its pop culture memorabilia unusually sold in convenience stores.

== Transportation ==
Just to the south is the U.S. Route 95 and Nevada State Route 163 intersection. 1.7 miles to the north is the Southern Nevada Visitor Center.
