= Everything, Everything =

Everything, Everything may refer to:

- Everything, Everything (album), a 2000 album by Underworld
- Everything, Everything (novel), a 2015 young adult novel by Nicola Yoon
- Everything, Everything (film), a 2017 romantic drama film based on the novel of the same name

== See also ==
- Everything Everything, an English indie rock band
- Everything Is Everything (disambiguation)
