= Nothing (disambiguation) =

Nothing is the concept of the absence of anything.

Nothing or The Nothing may also refer to:

== Mathematics, science and technology ==
- Nothing (company), a British consumer electronics manufacturer that makes the NothingOS for smartphones

=== Computers ===
- /dev/zero a special file in Unix-like operating systems that outputs zeros
- IEFBR14, an IBM mainframe utility program that acts as a placeholder whose purpose is to do nothing
- Null device, a special computer file, named /dev/null on Unix systems, that discards all data written to it
- Null, a value that a variable of nullable type in a computer program can take

=== Mathematics ===
- 0 (number), the mathematical concept of the quantity of things in "nothing"
- Empty set, the mathematical concept of the collection of things represented by "nothing"

=== Physics and astronomy ===
- Vacuum
- Vacuum solution (general relativity)
- Quantum vacuum state
  - QED vacuum
  - QCD vacuum
- Quantum fluctuation
- Bubble of nothing, mathematical instability in certain theories
- Boötes Void, also called the Great Nothing.

== Books ==
- Nothing (novel), a 2000 novel by Janne Teller
- Nothing: Something to Believe In, a 2007 book by Nica Lalli
- Nothing, a 1950 novel by Henry Green
- Nothing: A Portrait of Insomnia, a 2011 memoir by Blake Butler
- Nothing, a fictional substance in the Keys to the Kingdom series by Garth Nix
- The Nothing, a destructive force in the novel The Neverending Story and some adaptations

== Music ==
- Nothing (opera), a 2016 opera by David Bruce

=== Bands, musicians, and labels ===
- Nothing (band), an American shoegaze band
- Crossfade (American band), a rock band once known as the Nothing
- Jeffrey Nothing (Jeffrey Hatrix, born 1960), American singer formerly of Mushroomhead
- Nothing Records, a defunct American record label

=== Albums ===
- Nothing (Darkside album), 2025
- Nothing (Meshuggah album), 2002
- Nothing (N.E.R.D. album), 2010
- Nothing (Diatribe EP) or the title song, 1992
- Nothing (Zomby EP), 2011
- The Nothing, by Korn, 2019
- Nothing, by Æon Spoke, 2012
- The Nothing, by Johnny Polygon, 2013

=== Songs ===
- "Nothing" (A song), 2002
- "Nothing" (Dwight Yoakam song), 1995
- "Nothing" (Janet Jackson song), 2010
- "Nothing" (The Script song), 2010
- "Nothing" (A Chorus Line song), from the musical A Chorus Line, 1975
- "Nothin'" (Guns N' Roses song), 2025
- "Nothin'" (N.O.R.E. song), 2002
- "Nothin' (That Compares 2 U)", by the Jacksons, 1989
- "Nothing", by Aimee Mann from Whatever, 1993
- "Nothing", by Anthrax from Stomp 442, 1995
- "Nothing", by Apink from Horn, 2022
- "Nothing", by Brandy from Full Moon, 2002
- "Nothing", by Bruno Major, 2019
- "Nothing", by the Cat Empire from The Cat Empire, 2003
- "Nothing", by the Clay People from Toy Box, 1991
- "Nothing", by Cooliecut, Craig Xen and Killstation from Members Only, Vol. 4, 2019
- "Nothing", by Depeche Mode from Music for the Masses, 1987
- "Nothing", by Edie Brickell from Shooting Rubberbands at the Stars, 1988
- "Nothing", by Flipper from Album – Generic Flipper, 1982
- "Nothing", by the Fugs from The Fugs First Album, 1965
- "Nothing", by Gen Hoshino from Pop Virus, 2018
- "Nothing", by God Forbid from Determination, 2001
- "Nothing", by Hi-Standard from Making the Road, 1989
- "Nothing", by Holden & Thompson, 2003
- "Nothing", by Into Eternity from The Scattering of Ashes, 2002
- "Nothing", by Jeremy Camp from Stay, 2008
- "Nothing/Sad N Stuff", by Lizzy McAlpine from Give Me a Minute, 2020
- "Nothing", by Misery Signals from Controller, 2008
- "Nothing", by Modestep and Virtual Riot, 2019
- "Nothing", by Negative Approach from Tied Down, 1983
- "Nothing", by Norther from Death Unlimited, 2004
- "Nothing", by Obscura from Retribution, 2006
- "Nothing", by Pain from Dancing with the Dead, 2005
- "Nothing", by Papa Roach from Crooked Teeth, 2017
- "Nothing", by Paul Weller from 66, 2024
- "Nothing", by Phish from Undermind, 2004
- "Nothing", by Poppy from Negative Spaces, 2024
- "Nothin'", by Toni Braxton from Spell My Name, 2020
- "Nothin'", by Townes Van Zandt from Delta Momma Blues, 1970
- "Nothing", by Saliva from Under Your Skin, 2011
- "Nothing", by Stabbing Westward from Ungod, 1994
- "Nothing", by Velocity Girl from Gilded Stars and Zealous Hearts, 1996
- "Nothing", by Zara Larsson from Venus, 2024
- "Nothing (The Rat)", by Code Orange from Love Is Love/Return to Dust, 2012
- "Nothing (Why)", by Dope from Life, 2001
- "Nothing, Parts 1-24", an early title for the Pink Floyd song "Echoes", 1971
- "Nothin' Song", by Alice in Chains from Alice in Chains, 1995
- "The Nothing", by Eighteen Visions from Until the Ink Runs Out, 2000
- "The Nothing", by Kid Cudi from Speedin' Bullet 2 Heaven, 2015
- "The Nothing", by Skycamefalling from 10.21, 2000
- "Nothingness", by Golgotha from Wet Dreams of the Insane, 1991

== Other ==
- Nothing (film), a 2003 Canadian film directed by Vincenzo Natali
- Nothing, Arizona, an unincorporated (now abandoned) settlement in Mohave County, Arizona, U.S.
- n0thing (born 1990), American professional Counter-Strike player
- The Nothing, a character from Fortnite Battle Royale
- Not-Things, characters from the Doctor Who special "Wild Blue Yonder"

== See also ==
- Nihilism, a philosophical concept
- None (disambiguation)
- Null (disambiguation)
- Void (disambiguation)
- Zero (disambiguation)
