= Everything Is Everything =

Everything Is Everything may refer to:

- Everything Is Everything (Diana Ross album), a 1970 album by Diana Ross
- Everything Is Everything (Donny Hathaway album), a 1970 album by Donny Hathaway
- Everything Is Everything (Brand Nubian album), a 1994 album by Brand Nubian
- "Everything Is Everything" (Lauryn Hill song), a 1998 single by Lauryn Hill from the album The Miseducation of Lauryn Hill
- "Everything Is Everything" (Phoenix song), a 2004 single by Phoenix from the album Alphabetical
- Everything Is Everything, an American band featuring Jim Pepper, best known for their 1969 song "Witchi Tai To"
- Everything Is Everything, a 2005 album by Beats and Styles
- "Everything Is Everything" (Ballers), a 2015 television episode
