= Arizona State Route 95 =

State highway in Arizona, United States

State Route 95
- SR 95 highlighted in red

Route information
- Maintained by ADOT
- Length: 116.46 mi (187.42 km)
- Existed: May 26, 1936–present

Major junctions
- South end: BL 10 / US 95 in Quartzsite
- SR 72 south of Parker; I-40 north of Lake Havasu City; SR 68 in Bullhead City
- North end: SR 163 in Laughlin

Location
- Country: United States
- State: Arizona
- Counties: La Paz, Mohave

Highway system
- Arizona State Highway System; Interstate; US; State; Scenic Proposed; Former
← US 95	→ SR 96

State Route 95 (SR 95) is a north–south state highway along the western edge of Arizona that is split into two sections.

== Route description ==
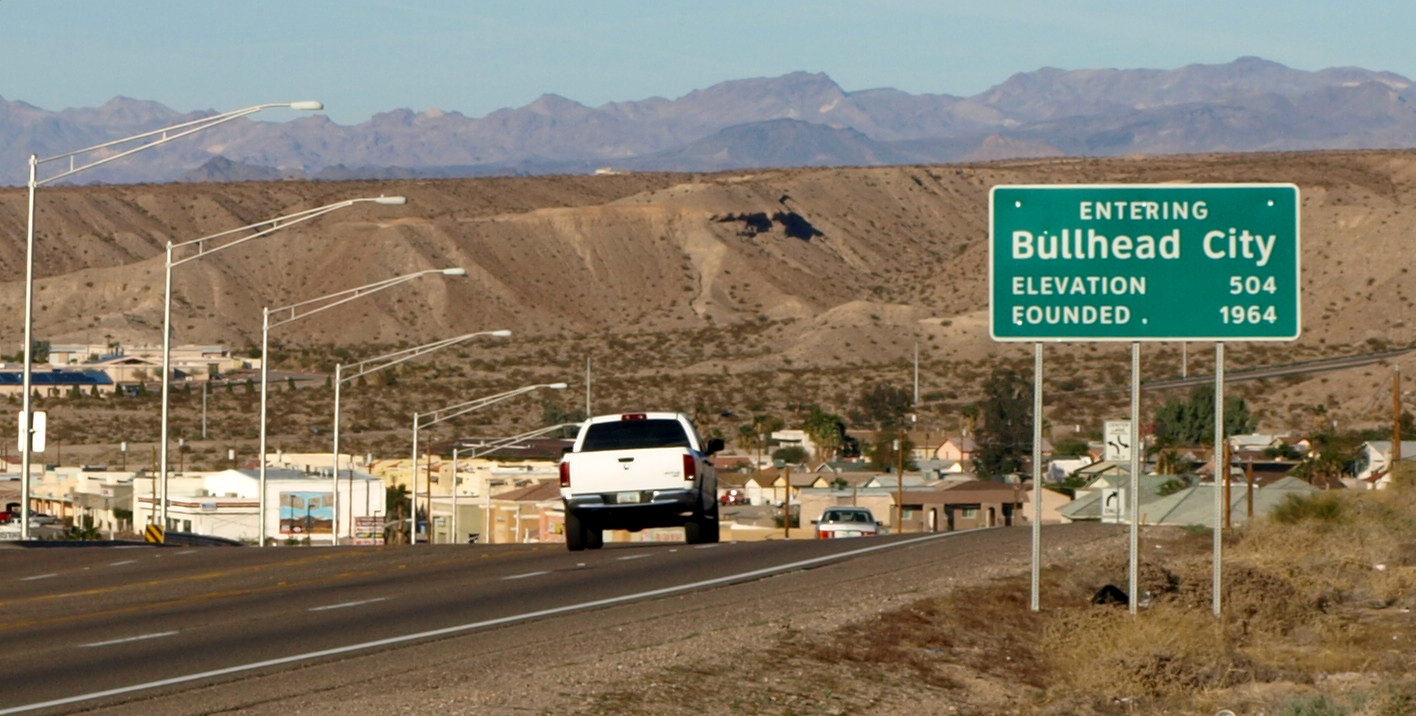
SR 95 approaching Bullhead City's southern city limits as seen in 2012.

The southern segment begins in Quartzsite at its junction with U.S. Route 95, traveling north to Parker then following the Colorado River until past Lake Havasu City, and finally intersecting Interstate 40. The northern segment (the Mohave Valley Highway) begins at the Colorado River bridge across from Needles, then goes directly northbound to Bullhead City, terminating at its junction with State Route 68 north of town.

There is a short SR 95 Truck at Parker, formerly a section of Arizona State Route 72, connecting to California State Route 62. Another spur, SR 95S, exists at Parker Dam, and is signed as a spur from the mainline but is unmarked along the spur itself. In Lake Havasu City, SR 95 also provides access to London Bridge.

As the primary north–south highway through much of the Arizona side of the Colorado River, SR 95 is an important thoroughfare for residents in the cities and towns of that area.

== History ==
State Route 95 (SR 95) was first designated on May 26, 1936, over a former county road between San Luis and Yuma. On June 20, 1938, SR 95 was extended north through Quartzsite to SR 72 in Bouse. The road south of Quartzsite to San Luis was renumbered as part of U.S. Route 95 on June 27, 1960. The road to Bouse was turned over to Yuma County to maintain in 1953–1955. Parts of SR 95 around the town of Parker were part of SR 72 until 1962. SR 95 also replaced SR 172 north of Parker. The part of SR 72 northwest of Parker became a spur of SR 95.

== Junction list ==
County	Location	mi	km	Destinations	Notes
La Paz	Quartzsite	0.00	0.00	BL 10 / US 95 – Phoenix, Blythe, Yuma	Southern terminus; I-10 BL is former US 60 / US 70; highway continues as US 95 south (Central Avenue south)
La Paz	Parker	22.63	36.42	SR 72 east – Phoenix	
La Paz	Parker	34.86	56.10	SR 95 Truck (California Avenue north) to SR 62 west – California	
La Paz		49.84	80.21	SR 95 Spur – Parker Dam	
Bill Williams River		52.81	84.99	Bill Williams Memorial Bridge	
Mohave		58.73	94.52	SR 95 Spur – Cattail Cove State Park	
Mohave	Lake Havasu City	73.52	118.32	Mesquite Avenue – London Bridge, Island District	Serves Havasu Regional Medical Center
Mohave		92.81	149.36	I-40 – Flagstaff, Bullhead City, Los Angeles	Northern end of southern segment; I-40 exit 9
Mohave	Gap in route				
Mohave		111.43	179.33	Colorado River bridge at California state line	Southern end of northern segment
Mohave	Arizona Village	117.23	188.66	Courtwright Road (CR 227 east) – Topock, Golden Shores	To SR 95 south via I-40 east
Mohave	Fort Mohave	124.80	200.85	Sterling Road	North end state maintenance
Mohave	Bullhead City	125.9	202.6	South end state maintenance	
Mohave	Bullhead City	126.89	204.21	Rainbow Drive	North end state maintenance
Mohave	Bullhead City	131.80	212.11	Merrill Avenue	South end state maintenance
Mohave	Bullhead City	132.86	213.82	First Street	North end state maintenance
Mohave	Bullhead City	133.61	215.02	7th Street	South end state maintenance
Mohave	Bullhead City	134.90	217.10	SR 68 east / Bullhead Parkway – Kingman	Bullhead Pkwy. serves Laughlin/Bullhead International Airport
Colorado River		135.10	217.42	Donald J. Laughlin Memorial Bridge; Arizona–Nevada line	
Colorado River		135.10	217.42	SR 163 west – Las Vegas	Continuation into Nevada
1.000 mi = 1.609 km; 1.000 km = 0.621 mi

== Truck route ==
=== Parker truck route ===
State Route 95 Truck
- Location: Parker
- Length: 0.85 mi (1,370 m)

State Route 95 Alternate (SA 95), also known as SR 95 Truck, is a short spur of SR 95 in Parker. Locally, it is also known as California Avenue. Commercial vehicles travelling from either end of the highway must stop at inspection stations situated at the Parker Port of Entry between 3rd Street and 4th Street, provided such facilities are open.

==== Major intersections ====
The entire route is in Parker, La Paz County.

mi	km	Destinations	Notes
0.00	0.00	SR 95 – Lake Havasu, Quartzsite	Southern terminus; SR 95 north (Riverside Avenue east) serves Avi Suquilla Airport; California Avenue continues as SR 95 south
0.85	1.37	Colorado River; Arizona–California state line	
0.85	1.37	SR 62 west	Continuation into California
1.000 mi = 1.609 km; 1.000 km = 0.621 mi

== Spur routes ==
=== Parker Dam spur ===
State Route 95S Spur
- Location: La Paz County
- Length: 0.78 mi (1,260 m)

State Route 95 Spur (SR 95S or SS 95(2)), is a short spur of SR 95 located in unincorporated La Paz County. Locally, it is also known as Parker Dam Road. Route ends at the Parker Dam which stretches into Parker Dam, California.

==== Major intersections ====
The entire route is in La Paz County.

Location	mi	km	Destinations	Notes
La Paz	0.00	0.00	SR 95	Southern terminus
La Paz	0.78	1.26	Parker Dam	Northern terminus at Parker Dam; continuation into California as Parker Dam Road
1.000 mi = 1.609 km; 1.000 km = 0.621 mi

=== Cattail Cove State Park spur ===
State Route 95S Spur
- Location: Mohave County
- Existed: 2015–present

State Route 95 Spur (SR 95S or SS 95(3)), is a short unsigned spur of SR 95 located in unincorporated Mohave County. Locally, it is also known as Cattail Cove Road. Route is the entry and exit road into Cattail Cove State Park, located a few miles southeast of Lake Havasu City, Arizona.

== See also ==
- California State Route 95
