= Nothing, Arizona =

- Ghost town
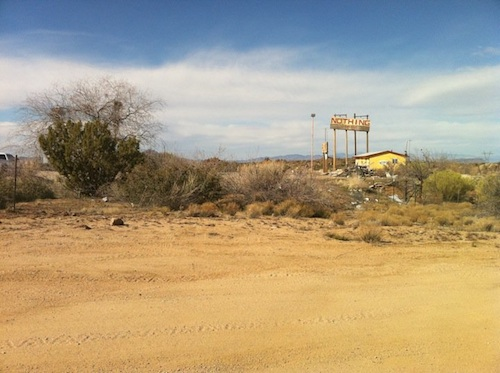
- Nothing in 2011

- Location within Arizona Location within the United States
- Coordinates: 34°28′47″N 113°20′7″W
- Country: United States
- State: Arizona
- County: Mohave
- Settled: 1977
- Elevation: 3,268 ft (996 m)

Population (2008)
  - Total: 0
- GNIS feature ID: 2675317

Nothing is a ghost town in eastern Mohave County, Arizona, United States.

== History ==
The locals told travelers it "got named by a bunch of drunks." Nothing has frequently been noted on lists of unusual place names.

The settlement was established in 1977 by Richard "Buddy" Kenworthy, located 118 miles (190 km) northwest of Phoenix, and 23 miles (37 km) south of Wikieup, the "rattlesnake capital of Arizona." It is west of Bagdad at milepost 148 1/2 on U.S. Route 93 (the Joshua Forest Scenic Parkway) between Wickenburg and Kingman, on the route from Las Vegas to Phoenix.

The Arizona Department of Transportation (ADOT) installed one of four motorist call boxes on U.S. 93 at Nothing.

At its height, Nothing had a population of four. The settlement contained a gas station and small convenience store.

== Abandonment ==
Nothing was abandoned by May 2005 when Kenworthy moved on from the settlement, and by August 2008, the disused gas station was beginning to collapse. An attempted revival of Nothing occurred at some time after August 2008 when Nothing was purchased by Mike Jensen. By April 2009, Jensen had opened his pizza business, run from a portable oven, with hopes of reopening the mini-mart and creating accommodations for RVs.

In April 2011, Nothing was marked as abandoned once again. The building has fresh boards in the windows, and no sign of inhabitance or any activity.

== 2016 promotion ==
In 2016, Century 21 Real Estate ran a "Give Dad Nothing" promotion where a free 24-hour lease to a piece of property at Nothing could be secured for June 19, 2016 (Father's Day) only. The promotion was done with the participation of the current property owner and included a downloadable "Certificate of Nothing" and gift card.

== See also ==
- Nada, Kentucky
