= Arizona State Route 68 =

State highway in Arizona, United States

State Route 68
- Colorado River Highway
- SR 68 highlighted in red

Route information
- Maintained by ADOT
- Length: 27.88 mi (44.87 km)
- Existed: 1941–present

Major junctions
- West end: SR 95 in Bullhead City
- East end: Future I-11 / US 93 in Golden Valley

Location
- Country: United States
- State: Arizona
- County: Mohave

Highway system
- Arizona State Highway System; Interstate; US; State; Scenic Proposed; Former
← SR 67	→ SR 69

State Route 68 (SR 68), officially referred to as the Colorado River Highway, is an east–west highway in northwestern Arizona running from its western terminus at its junction with State Route 95 in Bullhead City to a grade-separated interchange at U.S. Route 93 in Golden Valley. The western terminus formerly extended just to the west of its current point to Davis Dam; this became Mohave County Road 68 in 1998.

== Route description ==
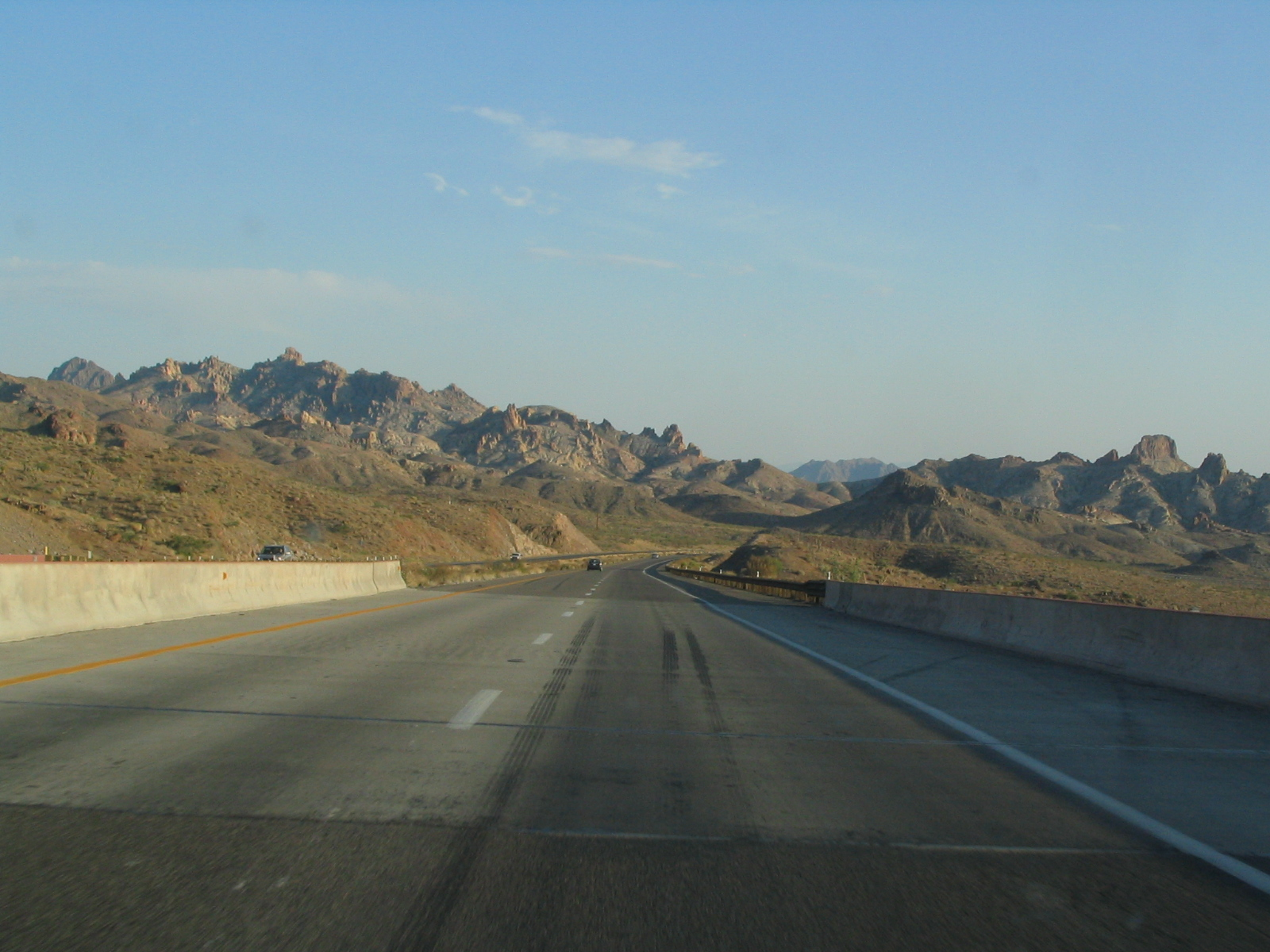
SR 68 westbound as seen in 2008

The primary purpose of this route is to carry traffic to Bullhead City and Laughlin, Nevada. Since September 11, 2001, the highway had also composed part of the mandatory detour for trucks and recreational vehicles traveling between Arizona and Las Vegas via US 93, due to the heavy vehicle restrictions over Hoover Dam. The detour was temporary and was removed on October 19, 2010, when the new bypass was completed south of the dam.

== History ==
SR 68 was a two-lane highway and had a high grade going through the Black Mountains. The highway was expanded to four lanes in the mid-1990s and now has a smoother ride through the mountains. There are two runaway truck ramps at six and ten miles westwards downhill from Union Pass.

Beginning with 2015 model year vehicles, SAE standard J2807 standardizes the setting of maximum trailer towing capacities. Among many other subtests, it requires an uphill (eastbound) pull on AZ-68 from near the Davis Dam at 550 ft (170 m) elevation at a minimum temperature of 100 °F (38 °C), driving the 11.4 mi (18.3 km) at a minimum of 40 mph (64 km/h) up the 7 percent grade (average 5%) to Union Pass at 3,570 ft (1,090 m) elevation.

== Junction list ==
The entire route is in Mohave County.

Location	mi	km	Destinations	Notes
Bullhead City	0.00	0.00	SR 95 to SR 163 west / Bullhead Parkway – Bullhead City, Needles, Laughlin, Las Vegas	Western terminus; Bullhead Parkway serves Laughlin/Bullhead International Airport; highway continues as SR 95 south
Golden Valley	27.88	44.87	Future I-11 / US 93 – Kingman, Las Vegas	Interchange; eastern terminus; former US 466; US 93 exit 67
1.000 mi = 1.609 km; 1.000 km = 0.621 mi
