= Nothing: Something to Believe In =

2007 book by Nica Lalli

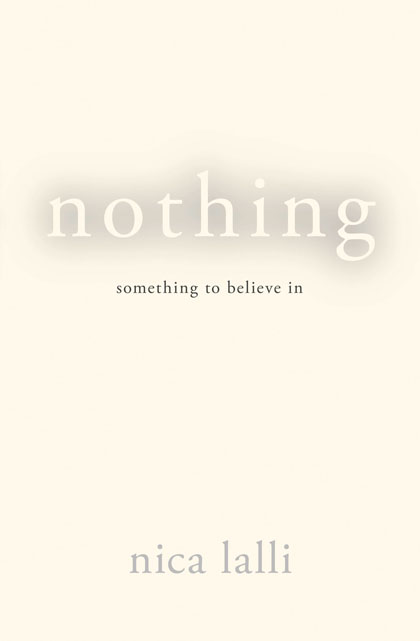
- Author: Nica Lalli
- Publisher: Prometheus Books
- Publication date: March 14, 2007
- Media type: Print (Hardcover)
- Pages: 224 pages
- ISBN: 1-59102-529-X
- OCLC: 77708486
- Dewey Decimal: 211/.8092 B 22
- LC Class: BL2790.L35 A3 2007

Nothing: Something to Believe in is a 2007 book by Nica Lalli that offers a personal account of atheism.
