= Golden Valley, Arizona =

CDP in Mohave County, Arizona

- CDP & Unincorporated community
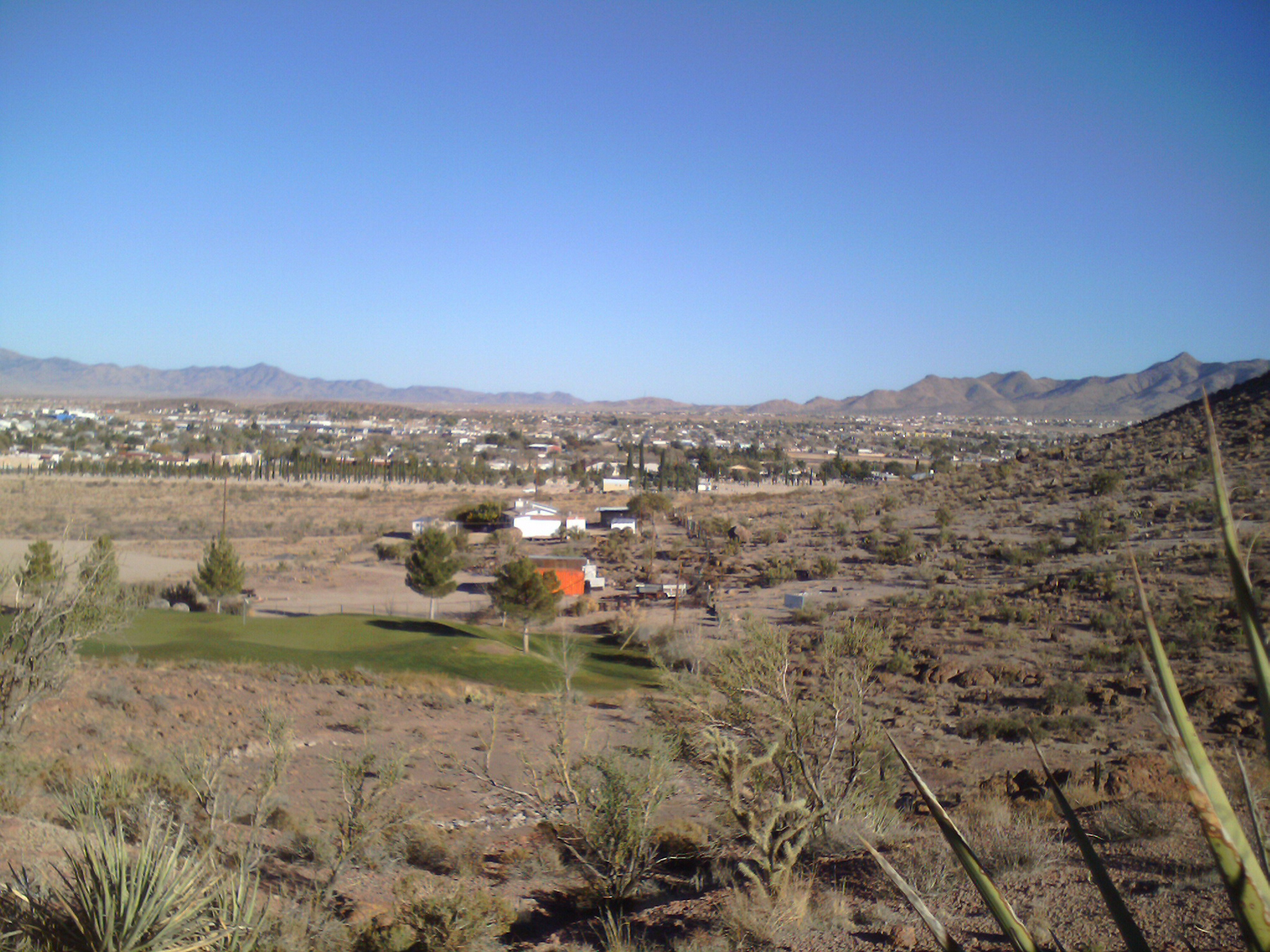
- The CDP of Golden Valley
- Interactive map of Golden Valley, Arizona
- Location within Arizona
- Coordinates: 35.2061°N 114.2328°W
- Country: United States
- State: Arizona
- County: Mohave
- Named after: G.V. Development Company

Area
  - Total: 78.745 sq mi (203.948 km^{2})
  - Land: 78.745 sq mi (203.948 km^{2})
  - Water: 0 sq mi (0.000 km^{2}) 0.00%
- Elevation: 2,717 ft (828 m)

Population (2020)
  - Total: 8,801
  - Estimate (2025): 7,942
  - Density: 111.8/sq mi (43.15/km^{2})
- Time zone: UTC–7 (Mountain (MST))
- ZIP Code: 86413
- Area code: 928
- FIPS code: 04-28195
- GNIS feature ID: 2408307
- Highways: SR 68, US 93

Golden Valley is a census-designated place (CDP) and Unincorporated community in Mohave County, Arizona, United States, located halfway between Kingman and Bullhead City. The population was 8,801 as of the 2020 census, and was estimated at 7,942 in 2025.

== History ==
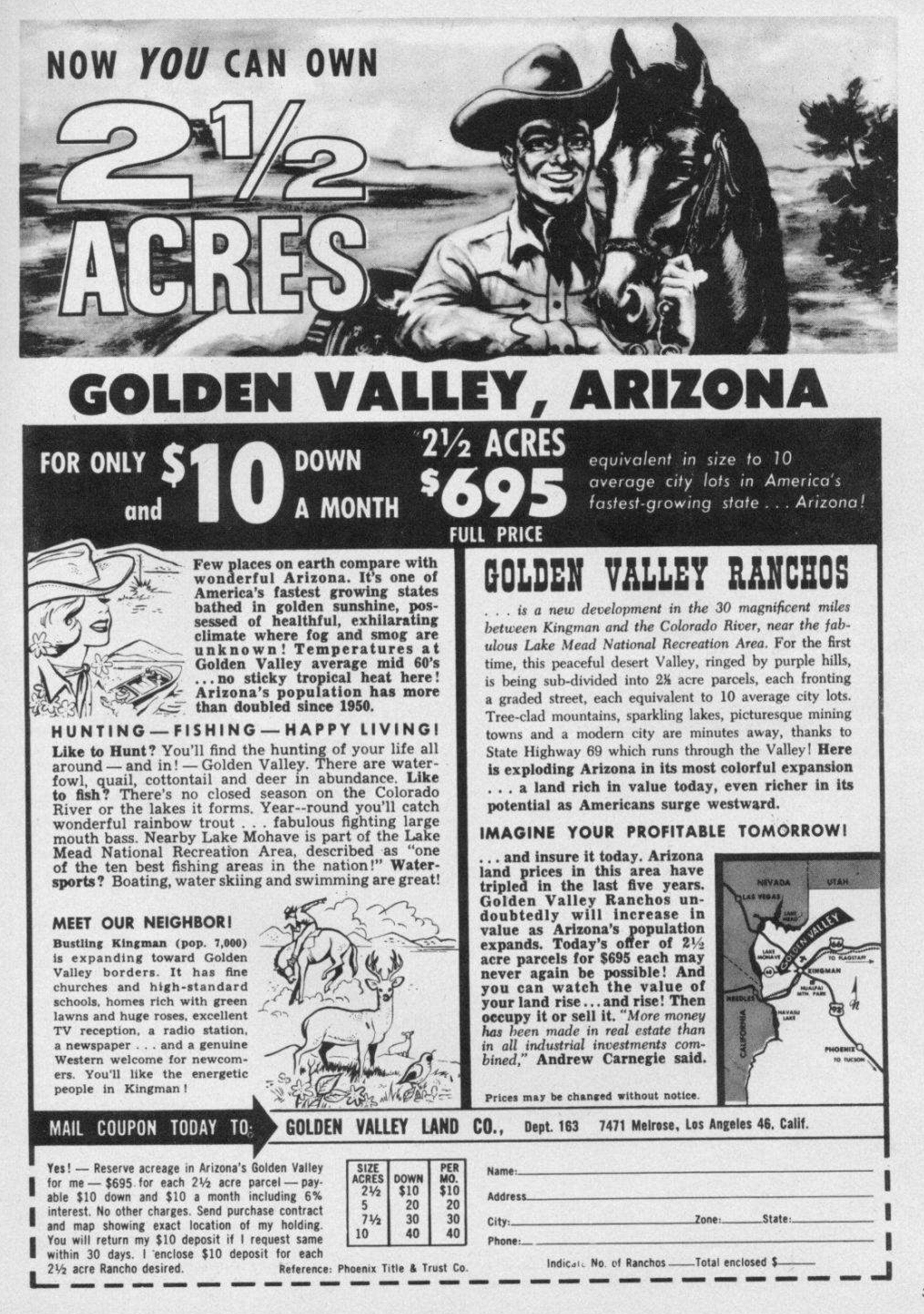
1960 magazine ad

Golden Valley was named after a company from Hollywood, California, that went into partnership with Crystal Collins to develop most of the land south of Arizona State Route 68 into 2.5-acre (1.0 ha) parcels. The company's name was Golden Valley Development Company. The land was split into 2.5 acre parcels and sold for $695 each: $10 down and $10 per month.

== Geography ==
The community of Golden Valley lies in the Sacramento Valley, separated from the larger neighboring cities of Kingman and Bullhead City by the surrounding mountain ranges. State Route 68 runs through the heart of Golden Valley, leading east 10 miles (16 km) to Kingman and west over the Black Mountains 23 miles (37 km) to Bullhead City. At the eastern end of Golden Valley, Arizona 68 terminates at U.S. Route 93, which leads to Kingman to the south, or Las Vegas, Nevada, to the north.

According to the United States Census Bureau, the CDP has a total area of 78.745 square miles (203.95 km^{2}), all land. The Golden Valley ZIP Code (86413) extends 10 miles (16 km) north and 15 miles (24 km) south of the CDP proper, but all population statistics refer to the CDP area only.

Residents work in Golden Valley, Kingman, Bullhead City, Lake Havasu City, Colorado City, and Laughlin, Nevada even as far as Las Vegas, Nevada.

== Demographics ==
Historical population
Census	Pop.	Note	%±
1990	2,619		—
2000	4,515		72.4%
2010	8,370		85.4%
2020	8,801		5.1%
2025 (est.)	7,942		−9.8%
U.S. Decennial Census; 2020 Census

According to realtor website Zillow, the average price of a home as of July 31, 2026, in Golden Valley was $244,889.

As of the 2024 American Community Survey, there were 4,123 estimated households in Golden Valley with an average of 2.08 persons per household. The CDP has a median household income of $42,585. Approximately 23.7% of the CDP's population lives at or below the poverty line. Golden Valley has an estimated 35.1% employment rate, with 4.9% of the population holding a bachelor's degree or higher and 74.3% holding a high school diploma. There were 4,694 housing units at an average density of 59.61 per square mile (23.02/km^{2}).

The top five reported languages (people were allowed to report up to two languages, thus the figures will generally add to more than 100%) were English (94.9%), Spanish (2.5%), Indo-European (0.2%), Asian and Pacific Islander (0.9%), and Other (1.5%).

The median age in the CDP was 59.2 years.

Golden Valley, Arizona – racial and ethnic composition Note: the US Census treats Hispanic/Latino as an ethnic category. This table excludes Latinos from the racial categories and assigns them to a separate category. Hispanics/Latinos may be of any race.
Race / ethnicity (NH = non-Hispanic)	Pop. 1990	Pop. 2000	Pop. 2010	Pop. 2020	% 1990	% 2000	% 2010	% 2020
White alone (NH)	2,456	3,988	7,093	6,957	93.78%	88.33%	84.74%	79.05%
Black or African American alone (NH)	5	19	36	66	0.19%	0.42%	0.43%	0.75%
Native American or Alaska Native alone (NH)	32	40	97	75	1.22%	0.89%	1.16%	0.85%
Asian alone (NH)	19	29	66	78	0.73%	0.64%	0.79%	0.89%
Pacific Islander alone (NH)	—	7	28	16	—	0.16%	0.33%	0.18%
Other race alone (NH)	0	0	2	38	0.00%	0.00%	0.02%	0.43%
Mixed race or multiracial (NH)	—	69	166	504	—	1.53%	1.98%	5.73%
Hispanic or Latino (any race)	107	363	882	1,067	4.09%	8.04%	10.54%	12.12%
Total	2,619	4,515	8,370	8,801	100.00%	100.00%	100.00%	100.00%

=== 2020 census ===
As of the 2020 census, there were 8,801 people, 3,943 households, and 2,407 families residing in the CDP. The population density was 111.77 inhabitants per square mile (43.15/km^{2}). There were 4,590 housing units at an average density of 58.29 per square mile (22.51/km^{2}). The racial makeup of the CDP was 82.99% White, 0.82% African American, 1.14% Native American, 0.95% Asian, 0.18% Pacific Islander, 4.15% from some other races and 9.77% from two or more races. Hispanic or Latino people of any race were 12.12% of the population.

=== 2010 census ===
As of the 2010 census, there were 8,370 people, 3,605 households, and 2,319 families residing in the CDP. The population density was 106.29 inhabitants per square mile (41.04/km^{2}). There were 4,342 housing units at an average density of 55.14 per square mile (21.29/km^{2}). The racial makeup of the CDP was 90.86% White, 0.47% African American, 1.53% Native American, 0.86% Asian, 0.33% Pacific Islander, 3.14% from some other races and 2.81% from two or more races. Hispanic or Latino people of any race were 10.54% of the population.

=== 2000 census ===
As of the 2000 census, there were 4,515 people, 1,822 households, and 1,288 families residing in the CDP. The population density was 160.99 inhabitants per square mile (62.16/km^{2}). There were 2,175 housing units at an average density of 77.55 per square mile (29.94/km^{2}). The racial makeup of the CDP was 94.00% White, 0.51% African American, 0.95% Native American, 0.73% Asian, 0.16% Pacific Islander, 1.82% from some other races and 1.84% from two or more races. Hispanic or Latino people of any race were 8.04% of the population.

There were 1,822 households, out of which 23.3% had children under the age of 18 living with them, 57.1% were married couples living together, 9.1% had a female householder with no husband present, and 29.3% were non-families. 22.6% of all households were made up of individuals, and 9.1% had someone living alone who was 65 years of age or older. The average household size was 2.48 and the average family size was 2.87.

In the CDP, the population was spread out, with 22.4% under the age of 18, 4.7% from 18 to 24, 21.7% from 25 to 44, 33.1% from 45 to 64, and 18.1% who were 65 years of age or older. The median age was 46 years. For every 100 females, there were 105.3 males. For every 100 females age 18 and over, there were 101.7 males.

The median income for a household in the CDP was $27,857, and the median income for a family was $30,662. Males had a median income of $26,319 versus $19,556 for females. The per capita income for the CDP was $13,948. 15.3% of the population and 10.6% of families were below the poverty line. Out of the total people living in poverty, 22.3% were under the age of 18 and 11.7% were 65 or older.

== Infrastructure ==
Golden Valley is an unincorporated area and is administered directly by Mohave County. Police protection is provided by the Mohave County Sheriff's Office; fire protection is provided by the Golden Valley Fire Department. K–12 education is provided by Kingman Unified School District. One elementary school, Black Mountain Elementary, is located in Golden Valley, but older students must be bused to Kingman for high school.

== Education ==
The CDP is in the Kingman Unified School District.

== State prison ==
The Arizona State Prison – Kingman has a Golden Valley address and is 10 miles (16 km) south of the community. When it was being sold to the residents of Golden Valley it was promised it would be a prison for DUI offenders only. Due to control of the inmate population problems the contract for the prison has changed hands since its opening. It is a for-profit prison operated by GEO Group under contract to hold inmates for the Arizona Department of Corrections.

=== 2010 escapes ===
On July 30, 2010, three inmates, two incarcerated for murders, one for attempted homicides, escaped from the facility. One was recaptured in western Colorado on August 1, after a shootout with a Garfield County deputy and city police in Rifle, Colorado. A second was recaptured by U.S. Marshals on August 9 in Meeteetse, Wyoming. The third escapee and his accomplice cousin were captured near Springerville on August 19, 2010, also by U.S. Marshals, in an east-central Arizona, White Mountains, U.S. Forest Service campground.

=== July 2015 riots ===
On July 1, 2 and 4, riots broke out once again at the Arizona State Prison – Kingman, at Golden Valley, which had "a long history of problems." Nine guards and seven inmates were injured, and the state brought in 96 members of its special tactical unit to quell the disturbances.

=== MTC contract termination ===
In August 2015, Arizona governor Doug Ducey terminated its contract with Utah-based Maintenance and Training Corporation (MTC) after an Arizona Department of Corrections investigative report revealed the company had "a culture of disorganization, disengagement, and disregard" of DOC policies.

== See also ==
- List of census-designated places in Arizona
