= Nevada State Route 163 =

Highway in Nevada

State Route 163
- Colorado River Highway (formerly Laughlin Highway)
- Nevada State Route 163, highlighted in red

Route information
- Maintained by NDOT
- Length: 19.246 mi (30.973 km)
- Existed: July 1, 1976–present
- History: SR 77 by 1942

Major junctions
- West end: US 95 in Palm Gardens
- East end: SR 95 in Bullhead City

Location
- Country: United States
- State: Nevada
- County: Clark

Highway system
- Nevada State Highway System; Interstate; US; State; Pre‑1976; Scenic
← SR 161	→ SR 164

State Route 163 (SR 163), officially referred to as the Colorado River Highway and formerly Laughlin Highway, is a state highway in southern Clark County, Nevada. The route connects the town of Laughlin to the rest of the state via U.S. 95.

NV 163 and Arizona State Route 95 provide the next closest public Colorado River crossing to Hoover Dam. Due to the restriction of commercial vehicles over the dam following the September 11 attacks, SR 163 comprised part of the required detour for truck traffic traveling between the Las Vegas and Phoenix metropolitan areas from September 11, 2001, to October 19, 2010, when the Mike O'Callaghan–Pat Tillman Memorial Bridge just downstream from the dam was opened to traffic.

Prior to the renumbering of Nevada state routes on July 1, 1976, SR 163 previously comprised the northern part of State Route 76 and all of State Route 77.

== Route description ==
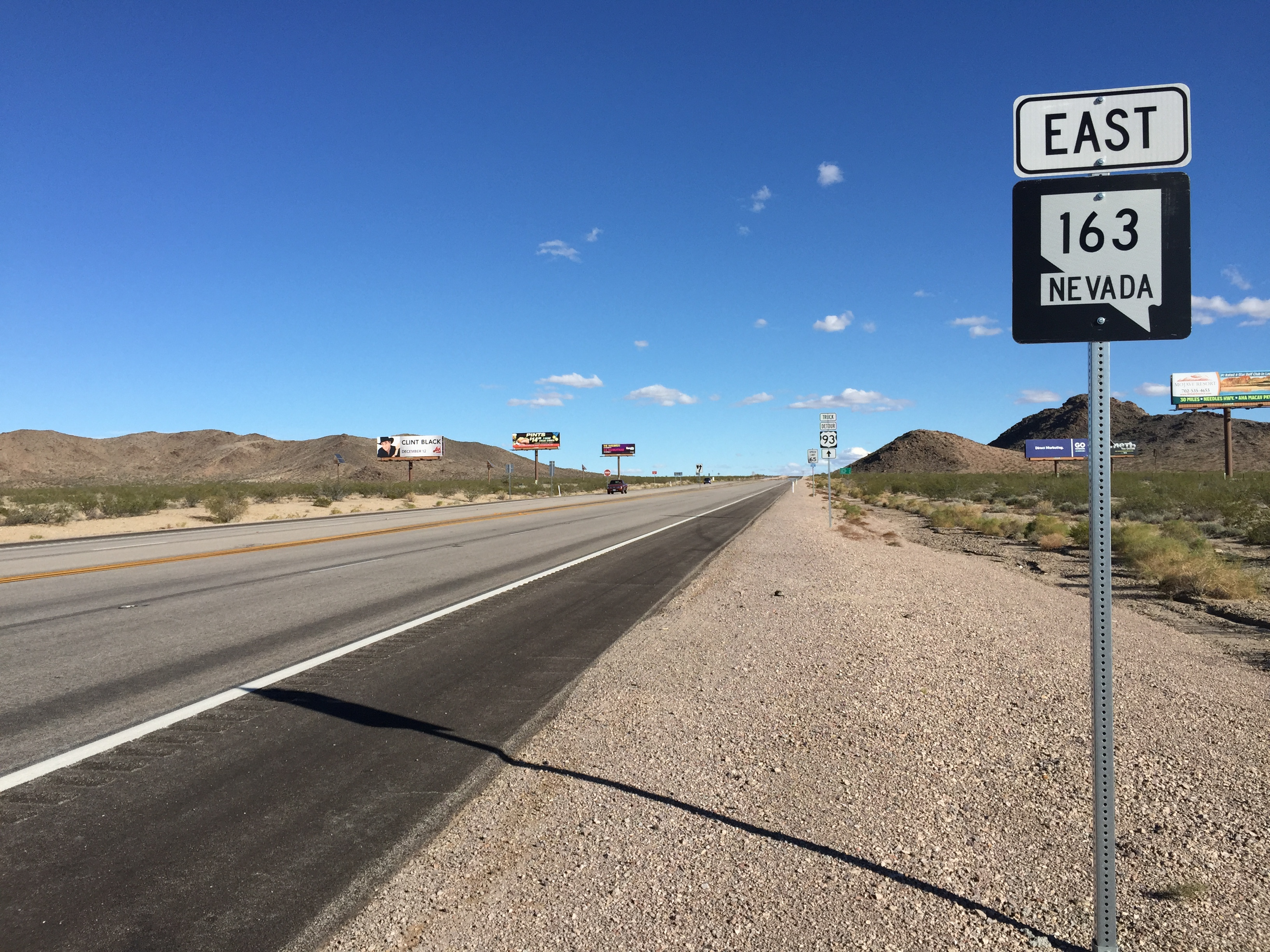
View from the west end of SR 163 looking eastbound as seen in 2015

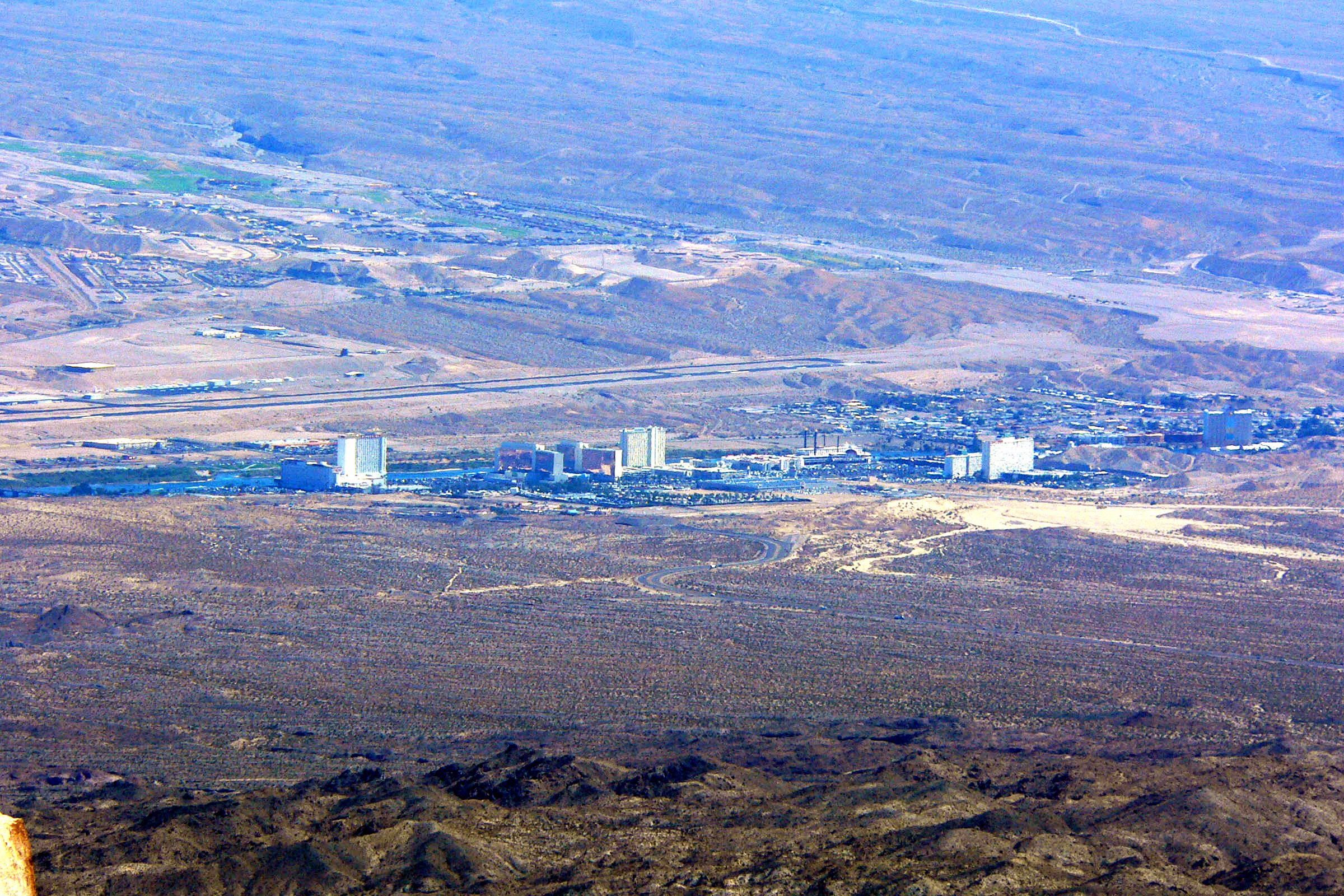
SR 163 (in the foreground) descending towards Laughlin and the Colorado River as seen in 2006

State Route 163 begins as a four-lane divided highway at its junction with US 95 in Palm Gardens just north of the California state line. From there, the highway negotiates some fairly steep mountain grades as it loses elevation heading east toward Laughlin. Just outside Laughlin, the divided highway comes together and intersects Casino Drive before crossing the Colorado River and entering Bullhead City, Arizona on Arizona State Route 95.

== History ==
State Route 77 first appeared on Nevada state maps in 1942 as an unimproved road. At that time, SR 77 had an eastern terminus near the Bulls Head Dam (later Davis Dam) site and a western terminus at former State Route 76 (now an unnumbered road), which connected to US 95 north of the current US 95/SR 163 junction. By 1947, the west end of SR 76 was realigned and paved; along with a paved SR 77, this new pavement would eventually form the majority of SR 163. As of 1973, the southern part of SR 76 was removed from the state highway system and SR 77 was extended to US 95 along the paved alignment of the former SR 76.

On July 1, 1976, Nevada's highway department began a project to renumber the state highway system. SR 77 was reassigned to State Route 163 during this process; this change was reflected on official state maps in 1978.

== Major intersections ==
The entire route is in Clark County.

Location	mi	km	Destinations	Notes
Palm Gardens	0.000	0.000	US 95 – Needles, Las Vegas	Wye intersection; western terminus
Colorado River	19.246	30.973	Donald J. Laughlin Memorial Bridge; Nevada–Arizona line	
Colorado River	19.246	30.973	SR 95 south to SR 68 east – Kingman, Bullhead City	Continuation into Arizona
1.000 mi = 1.609 km; 1.000 km = 0.621 mi
