= Everything (disambiguation) =

Everything is all that exists.

Everything may also refer to:

- Universe, everything humans perceive to exist
- Cosmos, the universe as an orderly system
- World, the planet Earth, or the sum of human civilization
- everything, an English indefinite pronoun

== Music ==
- Everything (band), an American rock band
- Everything Everything, an English band
- Everything (tour), a 2024 solo tour by Thom Yorke

=== Albums ===
- Everything (The Bangles album), 1988
- Everything (Climie Fisher album), 1987
- Everything (Faye Wong album) or the title song, 1990
- Everything (Henry Rollins album) or the title track, 1996
- Everything (Jason McCoy album), 2011
- Everything (Joe album) or the title song, 1993
- Everything (Mr. Children album), 1992
- Everything (P-Money album) or the title song (see below), 2010
- Everything (R. Stevie Moore album), 1984
- Everything (Teenage Jesus and the Jerks album), 1995
- Everything! (Tones on Tail album), 1998
- Everything (EP) or the title song, by Chely Wright, 2004
- Everything, by Lido, 2016
- Everything or the title song, a DVD by Lifehouse, 2005

=== Songs ===
- "Everything" (Alanis Morissette song), 2004
- "Everything" (Anna Vissi song), 2006
- "Everything" (Arashi song), 2009
- "Everything" (Buckcherry song), 2007
- "Everything" (Dum Dums song), 2000
- "Everything" (Fefe Dobson song), 2004
- "Everything" (INXS song), 1997
- "Everything" (Jody Watley song), 1989
- "Everything" (M2M song), 2001
- "Everything" (Madonna song), 2026
- "Everything" (Mary J. Blige song), 1997
- "Everything" (Michael Bublé song), 2007
- "Everything" (Misia song), 2000
- "Everything" (Nine Inch Nails song), 2013
- "Everything" (P-Money song), 2008
- "Everything" (Sebastian Walldén song), 2018
- "Everything" (TobyMac song), 2018
- "Everything (It's You)", by Mr. Children, 1997
- "Everything (Take Me Down)", by Dane Rumble, 2010
- "Everything", by Bitter:Sweet from Drama, 2008
- "Everything", by Canela Cox, 2001
- "Everything", by Collective Soul from Disciplined Breakdown, 1997
- "Everything", by A Cursive Memory, 2008
- "Everything", by Eleanor Friedberger from Rebound, 2018
- "Everything", by Ella Mai from Ella Mai, 2018
- "Everything", by G Herbo from Humble Beast, 2017
- "Everything", by Hardline from Double Eclipse, 1992
- "Everything", by Jackson Wang from Magic Man 2. 2025
- "Everything", by Jeremy Camp from Beyond Measure, 2006
- "Everything", by The Juliana Theory from Love, 2003
- "Everything", by Kehlani from Blue Water Road, 2022
- "Everything", by Lauren Daigle from Look Up Child
- "Everything", by Lil Baby from It's Only Me, 2022
- "Everything", by Lil Wayne from Lights Out, 2000
- "Everything", by Limp Bizkit from Three Dollar Bill, Y'all, 1997
- "Everything", by Michelle Williams from Heart to Yours, 2002
- "Everything", by Michelle Williams from Journey to Freedom, 2014
- "Everything", by Moka Only and Ayatollah from Bridges, 2012
- "Everything", by MUNA from About U, 2017
- "Everything", by Nas from Nasir, 2018
- "Everything", by Neverest, 2011
- "Everything", by Passenger from Young as the Morning, Old as the Sea, 2016
- "Everything", by Sam Sparro, 2019
- "Everything", by Shihad (as Pacifier) from Pacifier, 2002
- "Everything", by Snoop Dogg from 220, 2018
- "Everything", by SS501, 2005
- "Everything", by Stacie Orrico from Genuine, 2000
- "Everything", by Status Quo from Ma Kelly's Greasy Spoon, 1970
- "Everything", by Stereo Fuse from Stereo Fuse, 2002
- "Everything", by Superfruit from Future Friends, 2017
- "Everything", by Taproot from Welcome, 2002
- "Everything", by Tiësto from Elements of Life, 2007
- "Everything", by When in Rome from When in Rome, 1988
- "Everything (All at Once)", by Arcane Roots from Melancholia Hymns, 2017
- "Everything (Between Us)", by Liz Phair from Somebody's Miracle, 2005

== Other uses ==
- Everything (film), a 2004 British film directed by Richard Hawkins
- Everything (software), a desktop search engine for Windows NTFS drives
- Everything (video game), a 2017 video game
- Everything2, a web-based community
- The Everything Card, an early credit card
- Everything bagel, a type of bagel baked with a mix of toppings

== See also ==
- Cosmos (disambiguation)
- Everything, Everything (disambiguation)
- Universal quantification, in logic, denotes a statement that is true for everything
- Universe (disambiguation)
- World (disambiguation)
