= Mike O'Callaghan–Pat Tillman Memorial Bridge =

Arch bridge over the Colorado River near Hoover Dam

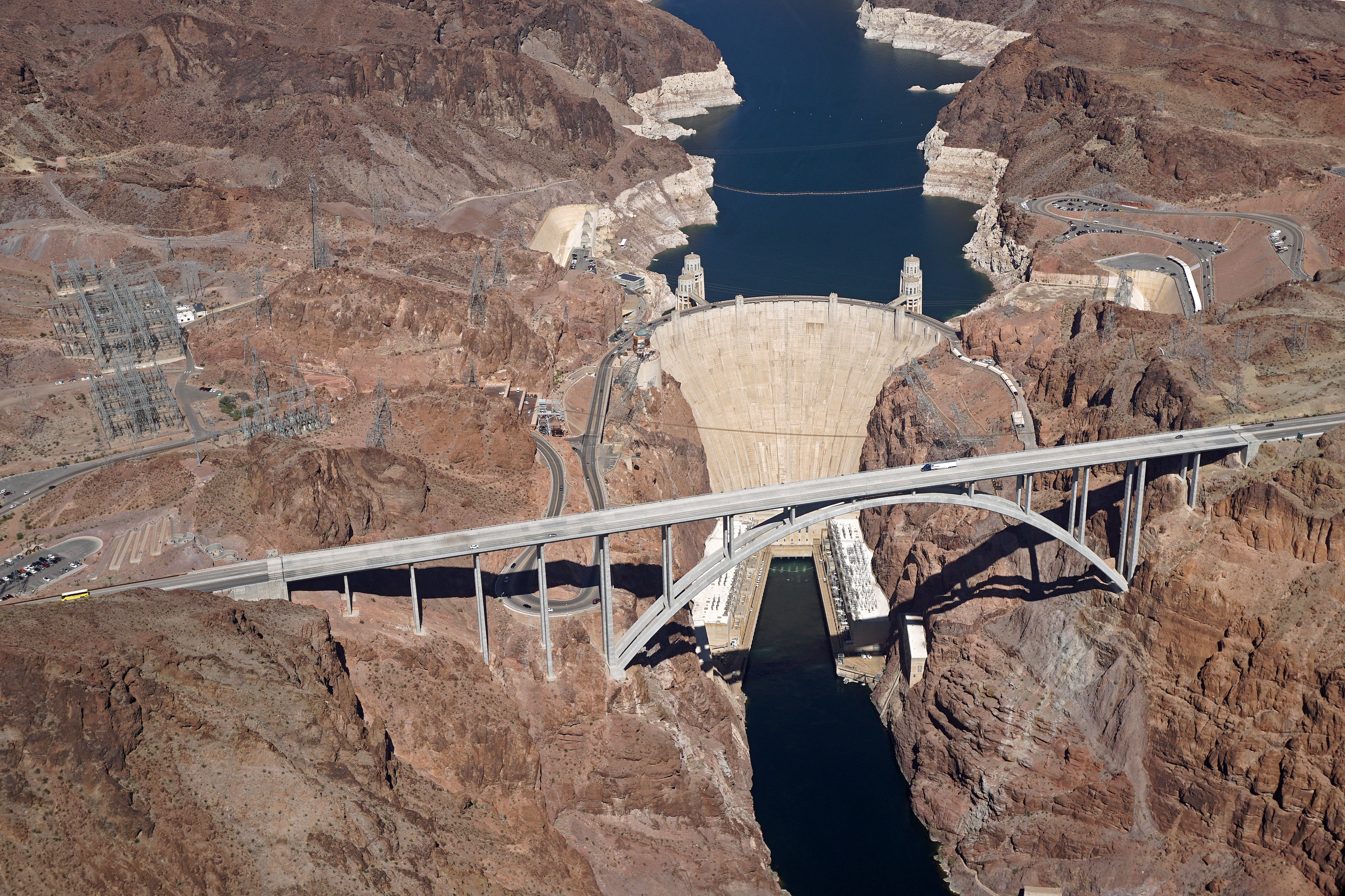
- The bridge in front of the Hoover Dam
- Coordinates: 36°0′45″N 114°44′29″W
- Carries: Four lanes of I-11 / US 93, pedestrians and bicycles
- Crosses: Colorado River
- Locale: Lake Mead National Recreation Area; Clark County, Nevada – Mohave County, Arizona
- Official name: Mike O'Callaghan–Pat Tillman Memorial Bridge
- Other name: Hoover Dam Bypass Bridge
- Maintained by: Arizona Department of Transportation (ADOT); Nevada Department of Transportation (NDOT)

Characteristics
- Design: Open-spandrel deck arch bridge
- Material: Concrete, steel composite
- Total length: 1,900 feet (579 m)
- Longest span: 1,060 ft (323 m)
- Clearance below: 890 ft (270 m) (Note: The arch rise is 277 ft (84 m).)

History
- Designer: T.Y. Lin International (designer); HDR, Inc. (design manager)
- Construction start: February 14, 2005
- Construction end: October 14, 2010
- Construction cost: $240 million
- Opened: October 16, 2010 (pedestrians); October 19, 2010 (traffic)

Statistics
- Daily traffic: 15,000

Location
- Interactive map of Mike O'Callaghan–Pat Tillman Memorial Bridge

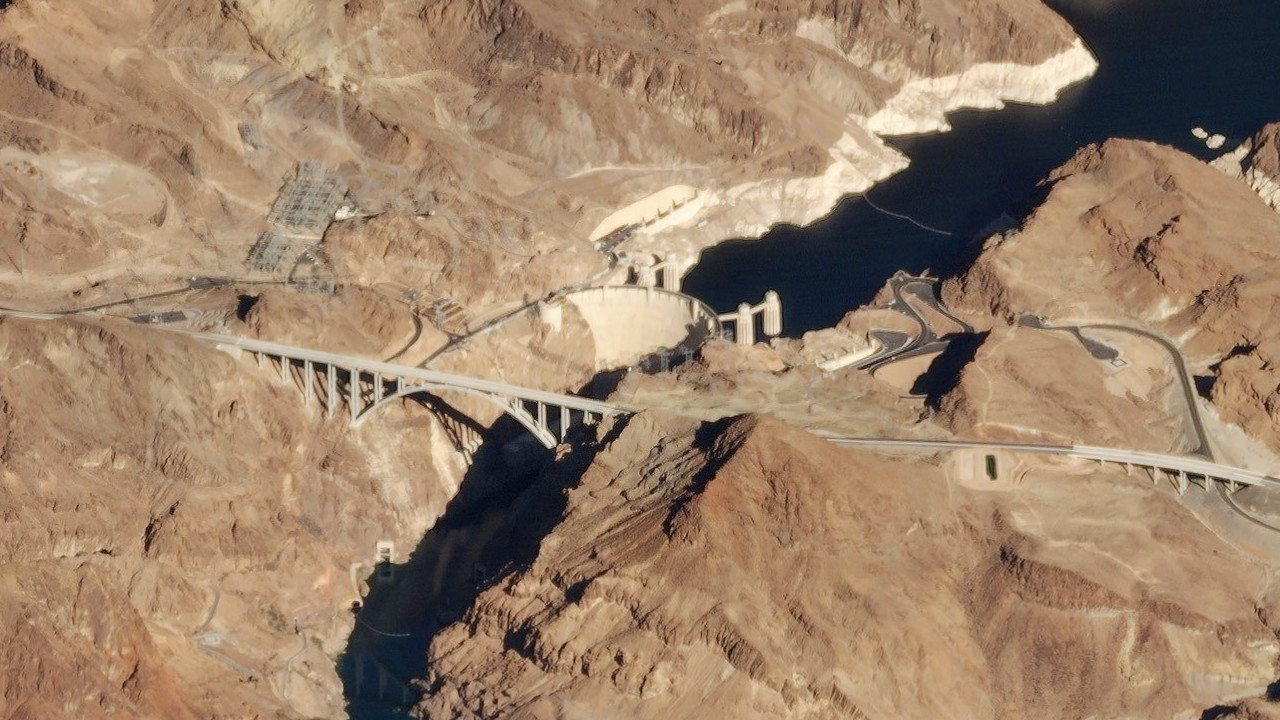
The Mike O'Callaghan–Pat Tillman Memorial Bridge in front of the Hoover Dam

The Mike O'Callaghan–Pat Tillman Memorial Bridge is an arch bridge that spans the Colorado River between the U.S. states of Arizona and Nevada. The bridge is located within the Lake Mead National Recreation Area approximately 30 miles (48 km) southeast of Las Vegas, and carries Interstate 11 and U.S. Route 93 over the Colorado River. Opened in 2010, it was the key component of the Hoover Dam Bypass project, which rerouted US 93 from its previous routing along the top of Hoover Dam and removed several hairpin turns and blind curves from the route. It is jointly named for Mike O'Callaghan, Governor of Nevada from 1971 to 1979, and Pat Tillman, an American football player who left his career with the Arizona Cardinals to enlist in the United States Army and was killed in Afghanistan by friendly fire in 2004.

As early as the 1960s, officials identified the US 93 route over Hoover Dam to be dangerous and inadequate for projected traffic volumes. From 1998 to 2001, officials from Arizona, Nevada, and several federal government agencies collaborated to determine the best routing for an alternative river crossing. In March 2001, the Federal Highway Administration selected the route, which crosses the Colorado River approximately 1,500 feet (460 m) downstream of Hoover Dam. Construction of the bridge approaches began in 2003, and construction of the bridge itself began in February 2005. The bridge was completed in 2010 and the entire bypass route opened to vehicle traffic on October 19, 2010. The Hoover Dam Bypass project was completed within budget at a cost of $240 million; the bridge portion cost $114 million.

The bridge was the first concrete-steel composite deck arch bridge built in the United States, and incorporates the widest concrete arch in the Western Hemisphere. At 890 feet (270 m) above the Colorado River, it is the second highest bridge in the United States after the Royal Gorge Bridge near Cañon City, Colorado; as that bridge is a tourist attraction that carries only pedestrians, the O'Callaghan-Tillman Bridge is the highest road bridge in the United States and the highest on the Interstate Highway System.

== History ==
In 1935, the American Association of State Highway Officials (AASHO, later AASHTO) authorized a southward extension of U.S. Route 93 from its previous southern terminus in Glendale, Nevada to Kingman, Arizona via Las Vegas, Boulder City, and a crossing of the Colorado River on the newly constructed Hoover Dam (then known as Boulder Dam). Clark County was sparsely populated at the time, with a population of less than 9,000 at the 1930 U.S. Census (compared to an estimated 2 million in 2013). Development in and around Las Vegas in the latter half of the 20th century made Las Vegas and its surrounding area a tourist attraction, and US 93 became an important transportation corridor for passenger and commercial traffic between Las Vegas and Phoenix. In 1995, the portion of US 93 over Hoover Dam was included as part of the CANAMEX Corridor, a high-priority transportation corridor established under the North American Free Trade Agreement (NAFTA). This bridge is a key component of the proposed Interstate 11 project.

Through traffic on US 93 combined with pedestrian and tourist traffic at Hoover Dam itself led to major traffic congestion on the dam and on the approaches to the dam. The approaches featured hairpin turns on both the Nevada and Arizona sides of the dam, and the terrain caused limited sight distances around curves. In addition to traffic safety considerations, officials were also concerned about the safety and security of Hoover Dam, specifically the impact a vehicle accident could have on the dam's operation and the waters of Lake Mead. Officials first discussed the need for a new Colorado River crossing that would bypass the dam in the 1960s. The U.S. Bureau of Reclamation, which operates the dam, began work on the "Colorado River Bridge Project" in 1989, but the project was put on hold in 1995. In 1997 the Federal Highway Administration took over the project and released a draft environmental impact statement in 1998. From 1998 to 2001 state officials from Arizona and Nevada as well as several federal government agencies studied the feasibility of several alternative routes and river crossings, as well as the feasibility of modifying the roadway over the dam, restricting traffic over the dam, or doing nothing.

In March 2001, the Federal Highway Administration issued a Record of Decision indicating its selection of the "Sugarloaf Mountain Alternative" routing. The project called for approximately 2.2 miles (3.5 km) of highway in Nevada, 1.1 miles (1.8 km) of highway in Arizona, and a bridge length of 1,900 feet (580 m) that would cross the river 1,500 feet (460 m) downstream (south) of Hoover Dam. Design work began in July 2001.

Security measures implemented following the September 11 attacks prohibited commercial truck traffic from driving across Hoover Dam. Prior to the completion of the bridge, commercial vehicles were required to follow a detour between Boulder City and Kingman via US 95, Nevada State Route 163, the Colorado River crossing between Laughlin, Nevada and Bullhead City, Arizona, and Arizona State Route 68. The detour was 104 miles (167 km) long, but only added 23 miles (37 km) to the normal journey on US 93.

== Design ==
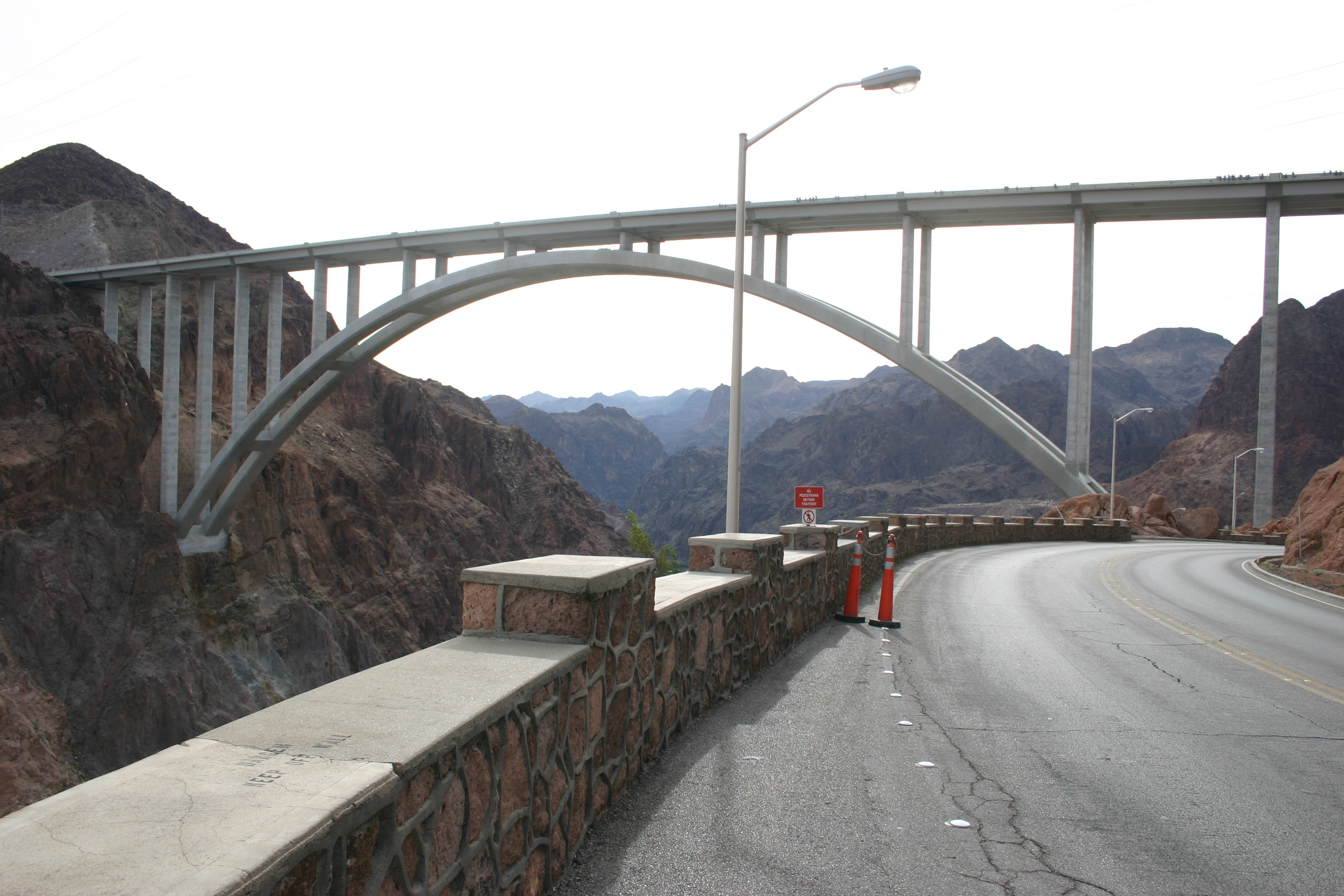
The completed bridge viewed from the Nevada side in December 2010

Project design was by the Hoover Support team, led by HDR, Inc. and including T.Y. Lin International, Sverdrup Civil, Inc., and other specialist contributors.

The bridge has a length of 1,900 feet (579 m) and a 1,060 ft (320 m) span. The roadway is 900 ft (270 m) above the Colorado River and four lanes wide. This is the first concrete-and-steel composite arch bridge built in the United States. It includes the widest concrete arch in the Western Hemisphere and is also the second highest bridge in the nation, with the arch 840 ft (260 m) above the river. The twin arch ribs are connected by steel struts.

The composite design, using concrete for the arch and columns with steel construction for the roadway deck, was selected for schedule and cost control while being aesthetically compatible with the Hoover Dam. Sean Holstege in The Arizona Republic has called the bridge "an American triumph". USA Today called it "America's Newest Wonder" on October 18, 2010.

Pedestrian access is provided over the bridge to tourists who wish to take in a different view of the nearby dam and river below, but the dam is not visible for those driving across it. A parking area is provided near the bridge on the Nevada side at what was a staging area during construction. A set of stairs and disabled access ramps lead to the sidewalk across the bridge.

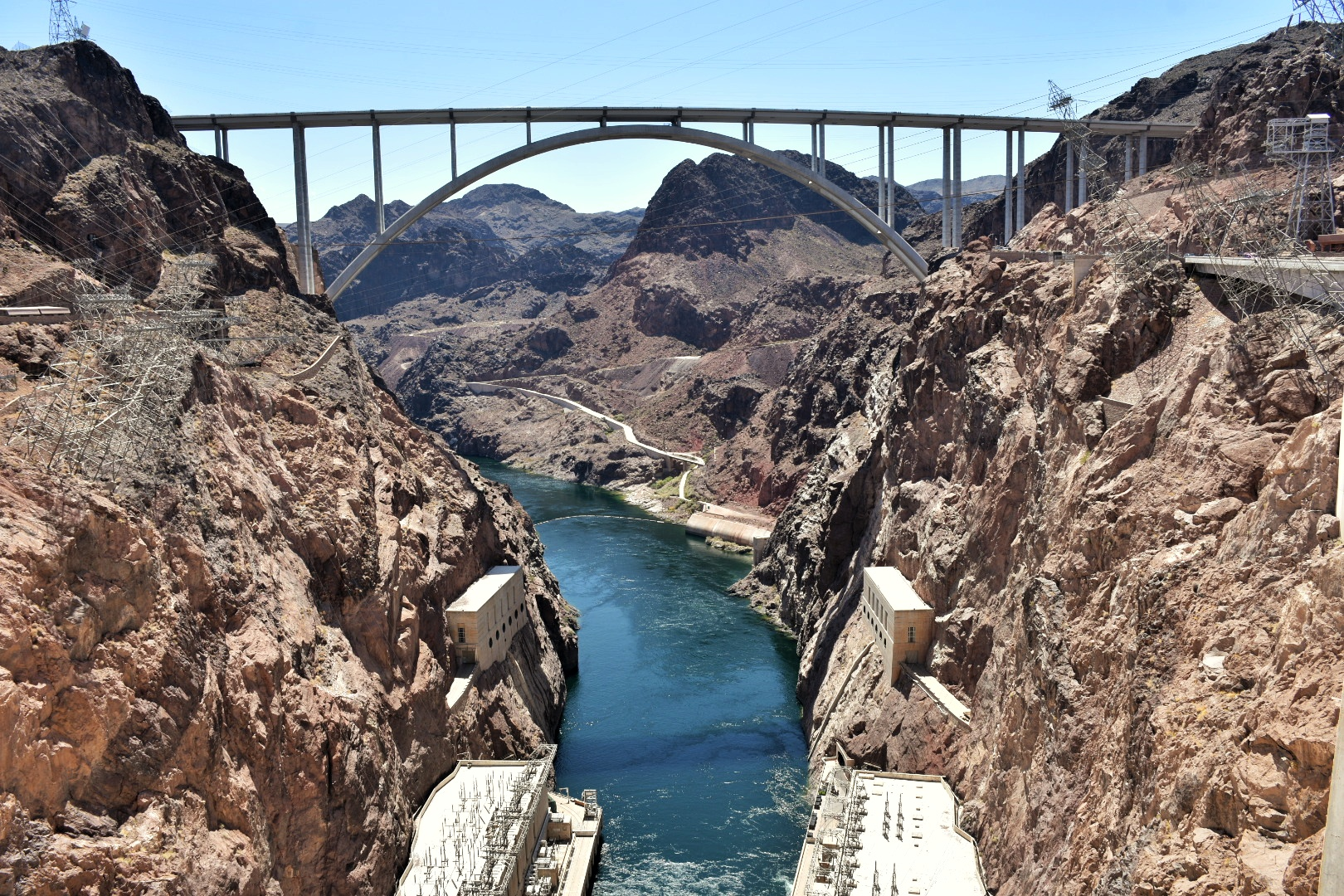
View from Hoover Dam

== Construction ==
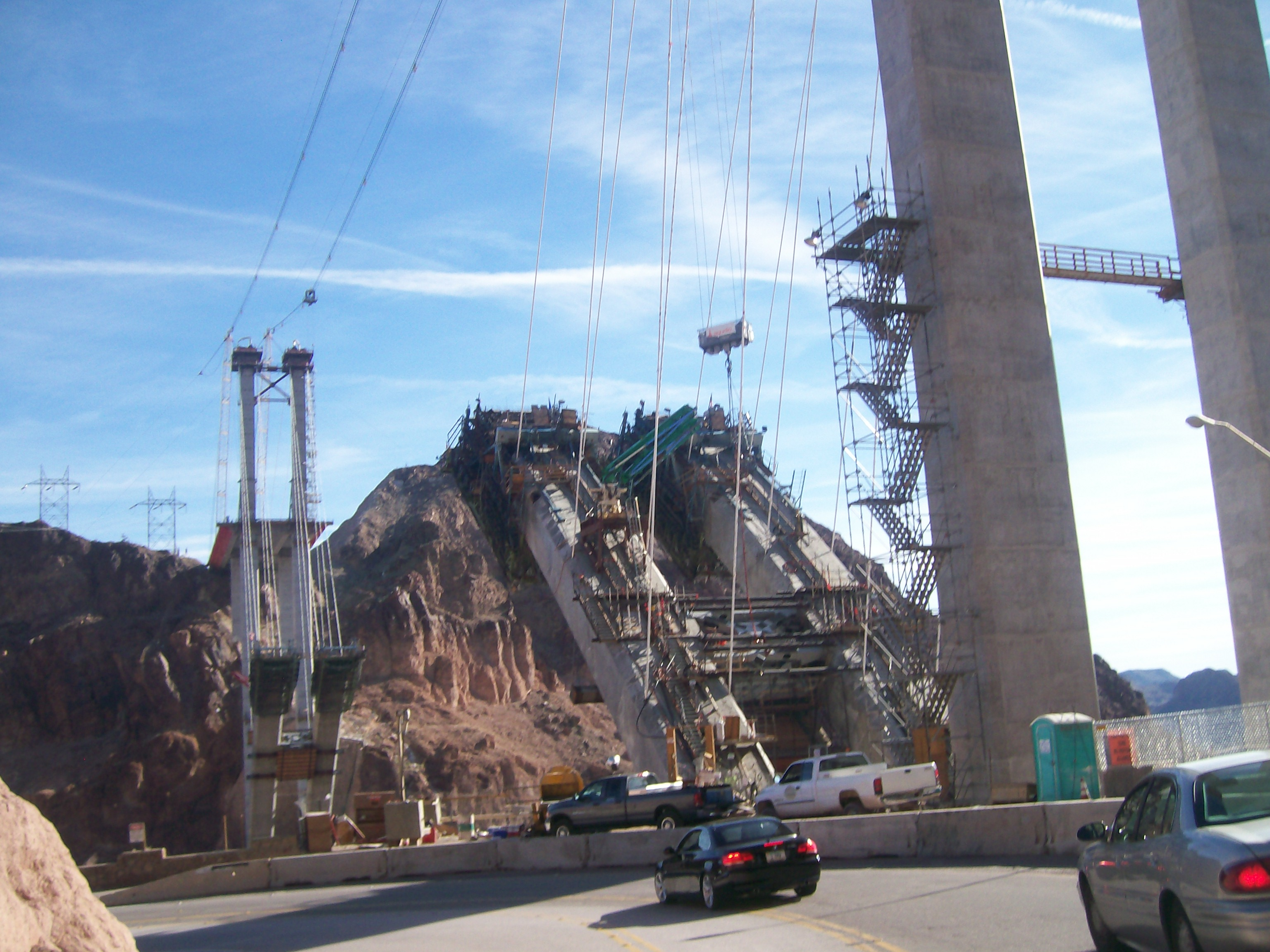
The bridge under construction, January 2009

Work began in 2003 on the approaches in both states and the construction contract for the arch bridge was awarded in October 2004. The largest obstacle to the project was the river crossing. The bridge and the bypass were constructed by a consortium of different government agencies and contractors, among them the Federal Highway Administration, the Arizona Department of Transportation, and Nevada Department of Transportation, with RE Monks Construction and Vastco, Inc, constructing the Arizona Approach, Edward Kraemer & Sons, Inc, the Nevada Approach and Las Vegas Paving Corporation undertaking the roadway surfacing on both approaches. The bridge itself was built by Obayashi Corporation and PSM Construction USA, Inc., while Frehner Construction Company, Inc. was responsible for completing the final roadway installations. A permit problem between Clark County and the subcontractor Casino Ready Mix arose in May 2006 over the operation of a concrete-batch plant for the project, and this caused a four-month delay.

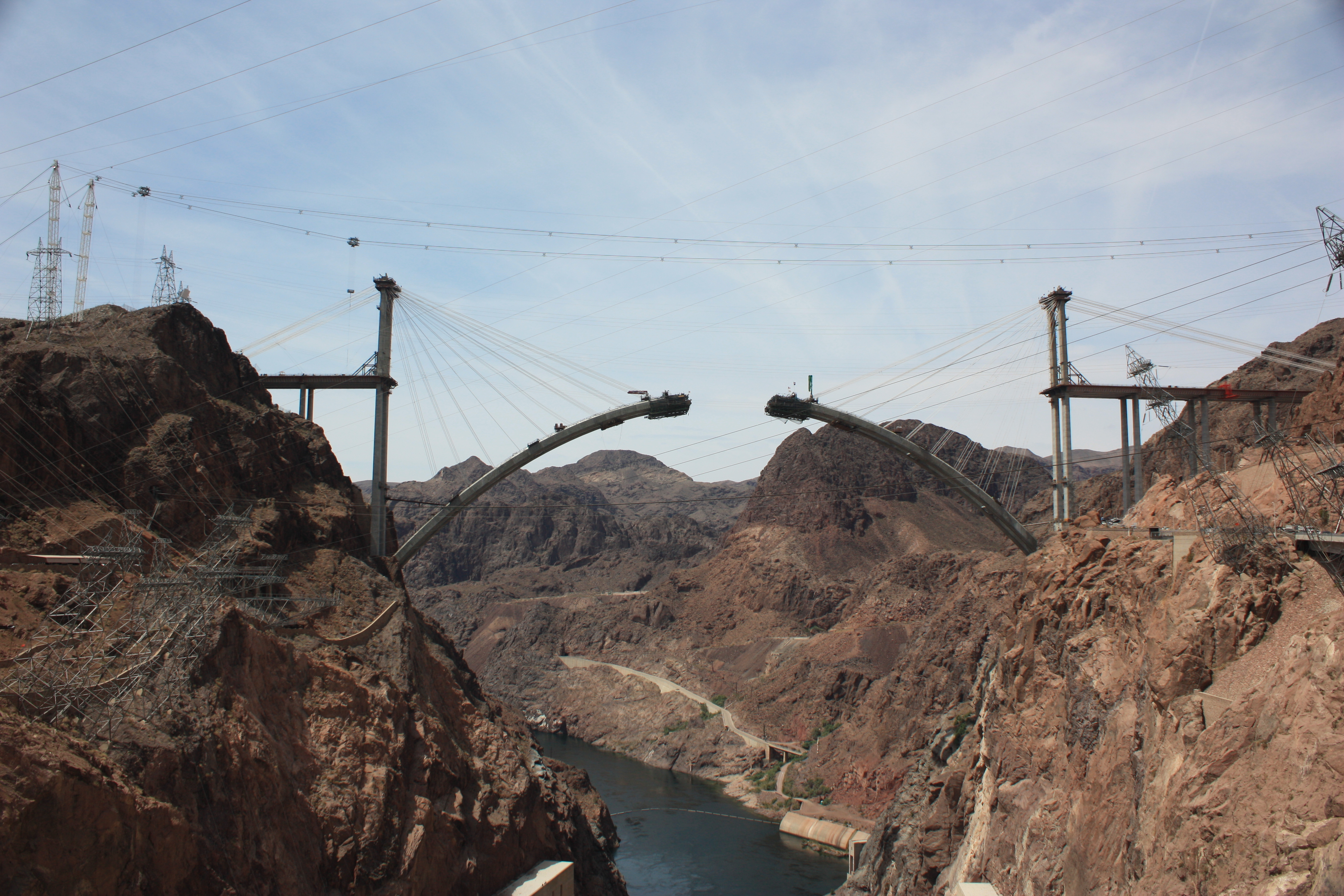
Construction of the arches, showing the diagonal cable stays and the high-line crane. June 2009

Construction required hoisting workers and up to 50 short tons (45 t) of materials 890 feet (270 m) above the Colorado River using 2,300 ft (700 m)-long steel cables held aloft by a "high-line" crane system. High winds caused a cableway failure in September 2006, resulting in a further two-year delay. The approach spans, consisting of seven pairs of concrete columns—five on the Nevada side and two on the Arizona side—were completed in March 2008. In November 2008, construction worker Sherman Jones died in an accident.

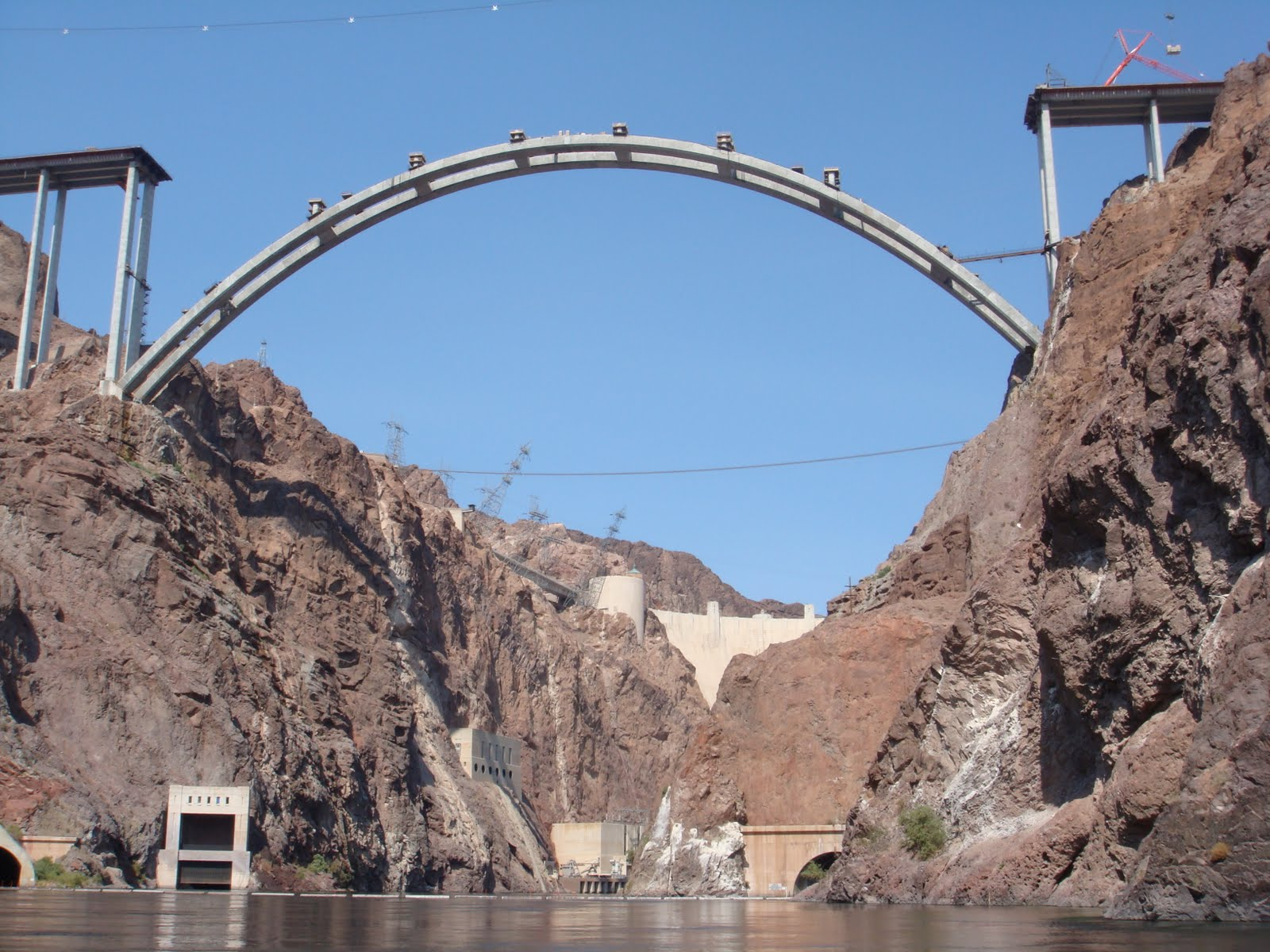
Completed arch in September 2009

The arches are made of 106 pieces—53 per arch—mostly 24 ft (7.3 m) cast in place sections. The arch was constructed from both sides of the bridge concurrently, supported by diagonal cable stays strung from temporary towers. The twin arch spans were completed with the casting of the center segments in August 2009. That same month, the two halves of the arch were completed, and were 3/8 inch (9.5 mm) apart; the gap was filled with a block of reinforced concrete. The temporary cable stays were removed, leaving the arch self-supporting. By December, all eight of the vertical piers on the arch had been set and capped, and at the end of the month the first two of thirty-six 50-short-ton (45 t) steel girders had been set into place.

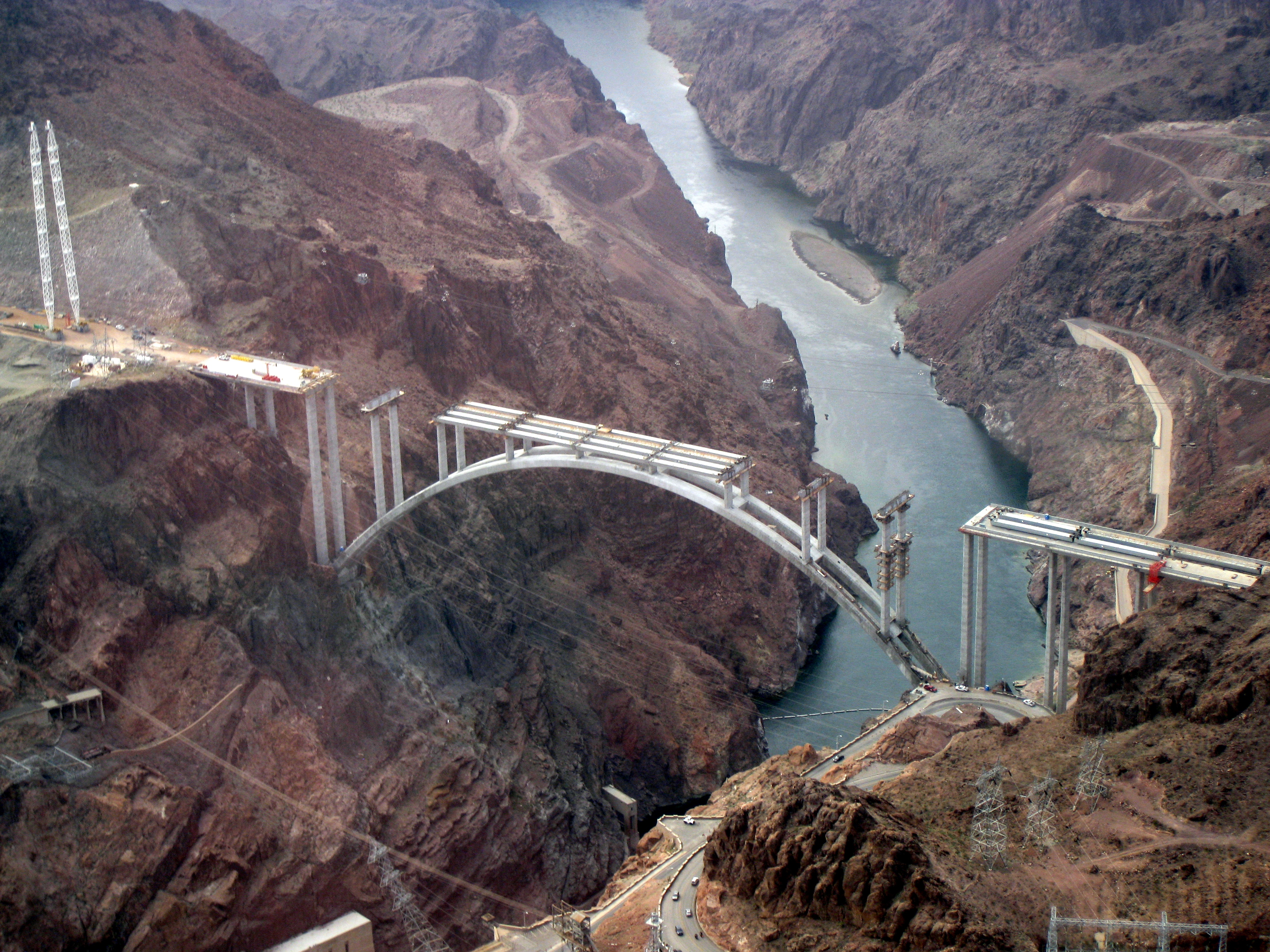
The nearly complete bridge seen from a helicopter in February 2010

By mid-April 2010, all of the girders were set in place, and for the first time construction crews could walk across the structure from Arizona to Nevada. Shortly thereafter, the pouring of the bridge deck began. The bridge deck was fully paved in July, and the high-line cranes were removed from the site as the overall project neared completion. The bridge was completed with a dedication ceremony on October 14, 2010. and a grand opening party on October 16. It was opened to bicycle and pedestrian traffic on October 18 and to vehicular traffic on October 19, a few weeks earlier than estimated. The building of the bridge was featured in episode 5x02 of the TV series Extreme Engineering. The filming of this episode took place before the start of work on the arch.

When the bridge opened to traffic, the roadway over Hoover Dam was closed to through traffic, and all visitor access to the dam was routed to the Nevada side; vehicles are still allowed to drive across the dam to the Arizona side following a security inspection, but must return to the Nevada side to return to US 93. The former US 93 route between the dam and its junction with the present US 93 route has been re-designated as Nevada State Route 172. The highway using the bridge was given the added designation of Interstate 11 in 2018, after the completion of the Boulder City freeway bypass.

== Naming ==
In late 2004, the proposed bridge name honoring Mike O'Callaghan and Pat Tillman was announced at a ceremony by the Governor of Nevada, Kenny Guinn, and the Governor of Arizona, Janet Napolitano. O’Callaghan, a decorated Korean War veteran, was the Governor of Nevada from 1971 through 1979, and he was the executive editor at the Las Vegas Sun newspaper for many years until his death on March 5, 2004. Tillman had been a football player for Arizona State University and for the Arizona Cardinals. He gave up his multimillion-dollar career in the National Football League to enlist as an infantryman in the U.S. Army, and was killed by friendly fire in Afghanistan on April 22, 2004.

== Incidents ==
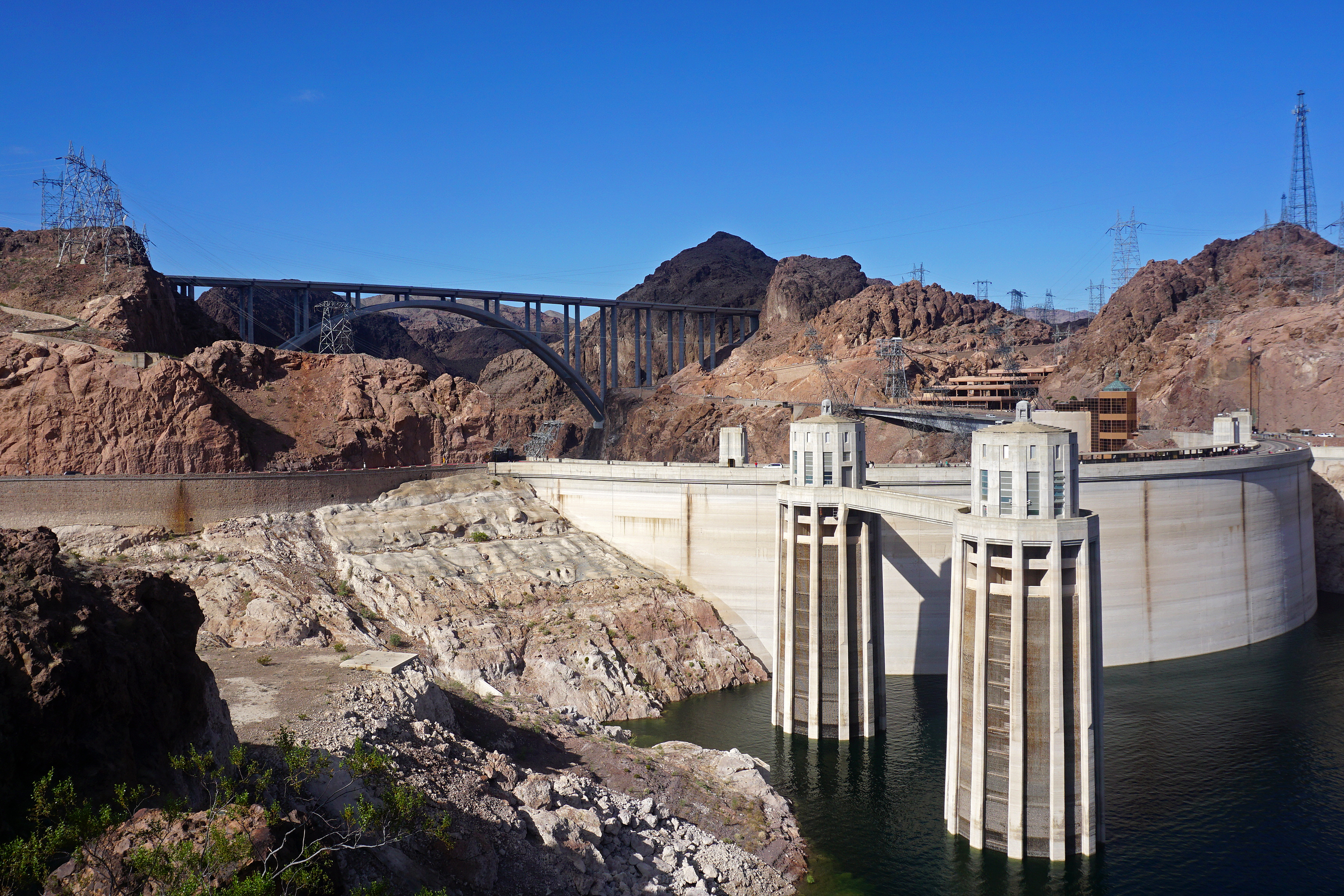
View from upstream of Hoover Dam with Mike O'Callaghan–Pat Tillman Memorial Bridge in background

=== Construction crane collapse ===
Strong winds gusting across the Black Canyon on September 15, 2006, appear to have been the cause for the collapse of the "high-line" crane system that was used to carry workmen and materials at the bridge site. No injuries or fatalities occurred because of this accident. Limited construction work resumed in October 2006, but this accident caused a two-year delay in construction.

The bridge-construction companies Obayashi Corp. and PSM Construction, USA, Inc. absorbed the cost of the debris removal and the rebuilding of the cranes. The reconstruction contract for the cranes was awarded to Cincinnati's F&M Mafco Inc.

=== Fatalities ===
Work was halted when a Las Vegas construction worker, 48-year-old Sherman Jones, was killed. A jack punctured his chest during construction while adjusting a cable used to align temporary concrete towers.

=== Suicides ===
The first known suicide at the bridge took place on April 7, 2012. Federal officials were unable to persuade the victim not to jump from the pedestrian walkway overlooking the dam. Others have happened since. Representatives of the Nevada Department of Transportation "are constantly monitoring the situation," and were "planning to discuss potential preventive measures on the bypass bridge" at their August or September 2012 meeting.

== In popular culture ==
- In the 2015 disaster movie San Andreas, the bridge is destroyed in a massive earthquake along with the Hoover Dam.

== See also ==
- List of bridges in the United States by height
- Robert Maillart, Swiss civil engineer and designer of the similar Salginatobel Bridge (1929–1930).

== Citations ==
- "Hoover Dam Bypass". Central Federal Lands Highway Division. Archived from the original on November 11, 1998. Official website.
- Goodyear, David; Klamerus, Bonnie; Turton, Rob (2005). "New Colorado River Arch Bridge at the Hoover Dam" (PDF). International Bridge Conference 2005. Pittsburgh: Engineers' Society of Western Pennsylvania: 16–18. Archived from the original (PDF) on November 11, 2006. "This will be the first arch structure of this scale to combine a composite steel deck with a segmental concrete arch and spandrels. The design is also unique in its use of steel Vierendeel struts between twin concrete arch ribs – a feature that both speeds construction and adds ductility to the lateral framing system for extreme seismic loads."
- Illia, Tony; Cho, Aileen (2009). "Buffeted by High Winds and Setbacks, a Bypass Is Making History Near Hoover Dam". Engineering News-Record. 263 (18): 18–24. ISSN 0891-9526. "for the article with the timeline."
- Illia, Tony; Cho, Aileen (January 5, 2010). "Buffeted by High Winds and Setbacks, a Bypass Is Making History Near Hoover Dam". pp. 1–3. "Same title but no timeline."
