= Gaming Hall of Fame =

Gambling hall of fame

- Description: Hall of fame recognizing individuals with significant contributions and leadership in the American gambling-entertainment industry
- Location: Las Vegas, Nevada
- Country: United States
- Presented by: American Gaming Association
- Website: http://gaming.unlv.edu/hof/

The Gaming Hall of Fame was established in 1989 to recognize individuals who have played a significant role in the American gambling-entertainment industry.

== Ceremony and administration ==
The Gaming Hall of Fame Ceremony takes place annually during G2E Las Vegas and is organized by the American Gaming Association (AGA) and its members to honor achievements in industry leadership and entertainment. Induction into the Gaming Hall of Fame is the highest honor accorded by the American gambling-entertainment industry. Each year, individuals who have distinguished themselves through significant contributions to the industry receive this distinction. More than 100 people have been inducted into the Gaming Hall of Fame since its inception.

== Inductees ==
People who have been inducted into the Hall of Fame are listed below, with their year of induction.

| Year | Inductees | Known For |
|---|---|---|
| 2026 | Holly Gagnon | Board member, Bragg Gaming Group; former CEO of Pearl River Resort, Chumash Enterprises, and Seneca Gaming Corporation |
| 2026 | Bill G. Lance, Jr. | Secretary of State, Chickasaw Nation; former Secretary of Commerce |
| 2026 | Scott Olive | Principal and founder, HRG Studios; slot-machine designer |
| 2026 | Timothy J. Wilmott | Retired CEO of Penn Entertainment |
| 2025 | David Berman | Co-Head of Macquarie Capital, Americas; Global Head of Consumer, Gaming & Leisure |
| 2025 | Ann Simmons Nicholson | Founder and CEO, Simmons Group |
| 2025 | Charles Lombardo | Former SVP of Gaming Operations, Seminole Hard Rock Gaming; former SVP of Slot Operations, Caesars Palace / Bally’s / Paris Las Vegas |
| 2024 | James F. Allen | Chairman, Hard Rock International; CEO, Seminole Gaming |
| 2024 | Alan Feldman | Responsible gaming expert; Distinguished Fellow, UNLV International Gaming Institute |
| 2024 | Debra Nutton | Former MGM Resorts International and Wynn Resorts executive; first female craps dealer |
| 2023 | Bill Anoatubby | Governor of the Chickasaw Nation |
| 2023 | Robert Miodunski | Executive at AGS and United Coin Machine |
| 2023 | Jim Murren | CEO of MGM Resorts International |
| 2023 | Ellen Whittemore | Executive at Wynn Resorts |
| 2022 | Gavin Isaacs | Gambling industry executive |
| 2022 | Virginia McDowell | Executive at Isle of Capri |
| 2022 | Michael D. Rumbolz | Executive at Everi and Chairman of the American Gaming Association |
| 2021 | Jeremy M. Jacobs | Chairman of Delaware North |
| 2021 | Jim Shore | General counsel of the Seminole Tribe |
| 2021 | Knute Knudson Jr. | Executive at IGT |
| 2020 | James R. Maida | Co-founder of Gaming Laboratories International |
| 2020 | Jeffrey A. Silver | Attorney |
| 2020 | Dr. Mark Yoseloff | Chairman and CEO of Shuffle Master |
| 2019 | Elaine Hodgson | Co-founder of Incredible Technologies |
| 2019 | Stanley Mallin | Co-founder of Caesars Palace and Circus Circus |
| 2019 | Ernie Moody | Slot machine pioneer |
| 2018 | Peter Carlino | CEO of Gaming and Leisure Properties |
| 2018 | Richard Haddrill | Chairman and CEO of Bally Technologies |
| 2018 | Philip Hannifin | Chairman of the Nevada Gaming Control Board |
| 2018 | Steven Perskie | New Jersey state legislator, led effort to legalize casinos in Atlantic City |
| 2017 | Diana Bennett | Co-founder and CEO of Paragon Gaming |
| 2017 | John Breeding | Founder and CEO of Shuffle Master |
| 2017 | Joe Kaminkow | Slot machine designer |
| 2017 | Mel Wolzinger | Casino investor |
| 2016 | John Acres | Founder of Acres Manufacturing |
| 2016 | Lyle Berman | Cofounder of Grand Casinos |
| 2016 | Don Brinkerhoff | Landscape architect |
| 2016 | Redenia Gilliam-Mosee | Atlantic City casino executive |
| 2016 | Richard A. "Skip" Hayward | Led effort to gain recognition for the Mashantucket Pequot Tribe, enabling the development of Foxwoods Resort Casino |
| 2015 | Victor Salerno | Co-founder, chairman and CEO of American Wagering Inc. |
| 2015 | Larry Woolf | Chairman, President and CEO of MGM Resorts International |
| 2015 | Lynn Valbuena | Chairwoman of Yuhaaviatam of San Manuel Nation |
| 2014 | Patricia Becker | Gaming attorney; former president of the International Association of Gaming Attorneys |
| 2014 | Jan Jones Blackhurst | Mayor of Las Vegas, executive at Caesars Entertainment |
| 2014 | Robert Faiss | Gambling attorney |
| 2014 | Ernest L. Stevens Jr. | Chairman of the Indian Gaming Association |
| 2013 | Gary Loveman | CEO of Caesars Entertainment |
| 2013 | Frank J. Fahrenkopf Jr. | Founder of the American Gaming Association |
| 2013 | Celine Dion | Singer |
| 2013 | Guy Savoy | Restaurateur at Caesars Palace |
| 2012 | Dennis Gomes | CEO and co-owner of Resorts Casino Hotel |
| 2012 | William Raggio | United States Senator from Nevada |
| 2012 | Guy Laliberte | Founder of Cirque du Soleil |
| 2012 | Julian Serrano | Restaurateur at Las Vegas casinos |
| 2011 | Sheldon G. Adelson | Chairman of Las Vegas Sands |
| 2011 | William Eadington | Academic who studied the gaming industry |
| 2011 | Blue Man Group | Performance artists at Las Vegas casinos |
| 2011 | Charlie Palmer | Restaurateur at Nevada casinos |
| 2010 | Tim Parrott | CEO of Shuffle Master |
| 2009 | Michael Gaughan | Founder of Coast Casinos |
| 2008 | Bernard Goldstein | Founder of Isle of Capri Casinos, "father of riverboat gaming" |
| 2008 | Robert Arum | Boxing promoter |
| 2008 | Don King | Boxing promoter |
| 2008 | Emeril Lagasse | Restaurateur at casinos |
| 2007 | John Wilhelm | President of Hotel Employees and Restaurant Employees International Union |
| 2007 | Clifford Perlman | CEO of Caesars World |
| 2007 | David Copperfield | Magician at casinos |
| 2007 | Michael Mina | Restaurateur at Las Vegas casinos |
| 2006 | Steve Wynn | Chairman of Mirage Resorts, founder of Wynn Resorts |
| 2006 | Alex Stratta | Restaurateur at Las Vegas casinos |
| 2006 | Franco Dragone | Director of Cirque du Soleil shows and Le Rêve |
| 2005 | Craig H. Neilsen | Founder of Ameristar Casinos |
| 2005 | Larry Ruvo | Liquor distributor in Las Vegas, philanthropist |
| 2005 | Debbie Reynolds | Singer at casinos |
| 2005 | Wolfgang Puck | Restaurateur at casinos |
| 2004 | Fred Benniger | Chairman of Metro-Goldwyn-Mayer and MGM Grand, Inc. |
| 2004 | Jack Binion | Founder of Horseshoe Gaming |
| 2004 | Don Rickles | Comedian at casinos |
| 2003 | Phil Satre | Chairman and CEO of Harrah's |
| 2003 | Tom Jones | Singer at casinos |
| 2002 | Merv Griffin | Owner of Resorts International, investor in Players International |
| 2001 | Harry Reid | United States Senator from Nevada, chairman of the Nevada Gaming Commission |
| 2001 | Paul Anka | Singer at casinos |
| 2001 | Rick Hill | Chairman of the Indian Gaming Association |
| 2000 | J. Terrence Lanni | Chairman of MGM Mirage, executive of Caesars World |
| 2000 | Wayne Newton | Singer at casinos |
| 1999 | Steve Lawrence & Eydie Gorme | Singers at casinos |
| 1999 | Elaine Wynn | Director of Mirage Resorts and Wynn Resorts, philanthropist |
| 1999 | Jack Entratter | Executive at the Sands Hotel |
| 1998 | Siegfried & Roy | Magicians at casinos |
| 1998 | Anthony Marnell, II | Architect; chairman and CEO of Rio Hotel & Casino |
| 1998 | Lud Corrao | Architect |
| 1998 | J.K. Houssels Jr. | Chairman of Showboat |
| 1998 | Thomas Young Sr. | Founder of Young Electric Sign Company |
| 1997 | Charles Mathewson | Chairman and CEO of IGT |
| 1997 | Frank Sinatra | Singer at casinos; part-owner of Sands Hotel and Casino and Cal Neva Lodge & Casino |
| 1996 | Donald Carano | Founder of Eldorado Resort Casino |
| 1996 | Paul Endy | Founder of Paul-Son Gaming Group |
| 1996 | Michael Rose | Attorney; Chairman of Holiday Corp. |
| 1995 | Len Ainsworth | Founder of Aristocrat Leisure |
| 1995 | Burton Cohen | Executive at the Desert Inn |
| 1995 | Donald Trump | Developer of casinos in Atlantic City and Indiana |
| 1994 | Frank Modica | Executive at Showboat |
| 1994 | Bud and Jean Jones | Founder and CEO of Bud Jones Co. |
| 1993 | Bill Boyd | Co-founder of Boyd Gaming |
| 1993 | Henry Gluck | Chairman of Caesars World |
| 1993 | Harvey and Llewellyn Gross | Founders of Harveys Resort & Casino |
| 1993 | Leonard Prescott | Chairman of Little Six |
| 1992 | John Ascuaga | Founder of Nugget Casino Resort |
| 1992 | Sol Kerzner | Developer of casinos in South Africa and at Paradise Island |
| 1992 | Claudine Williams | Chairwoman of Harrah's |
| 1991 | Sam Boyd | Cofounder of Boyd Gaming |
| 1991 | James Crosby | Chairman of Resorts International |
| 1991 | Kirk Kerkorian | Founder of MGM Resorts International, developer of the International Hotel and MGM Grand Hotel and Casino |
| 1991 | Don Laughlin | Namesake of Laughlin, Nevada, developer of the Riverside Resort Hotel & Casino |
| 1991 | Bill Pennington | Executive at Circus Circus |
| 1991 | William "Si" Redd | Founder of International Game Technology |
| 1990 | Bill Bennett | Cofounder of Circus Circus Enterprises, owner of the Sahara Hotel and Casino |
| 1990 | Benny Binion | Owner of Binion's Horseshoe, founder of the World Series of Poker |
| 1990 | Jackie Gaughan | Owner of several casinos in Downtown Las Vegas |
| 1990 | Barron Hilton | President of Hilton Hotels |
| 1990 | Raymond Smith | Co-founder of Harold's Club |
| 1989 | Warren Nelson | Owner of Club Cal-Neva |
| 1989 | Jay Sarno | Developer of Caesars Palace and Circus Circus Las Vegas |
| 1989 | William Harrah | Developer of Harrah's Reno and Harrah's Lake Tahoe |
| 1989 | Grant Sawyer | Governor of Nevada, influential in development of gaming regulations |
| 1989 | E. Parry Thomas | Banker who financed numerous casinos in Las Vegas |

== See also ==
- Blackjack Hall of Fame
- Poker Hall of Fame
