= Benninger =

Benninger is a surname. Notable people with the surname include:

- Christopher Charles Benninger (1942–2024), American-Indian architect and planner
- Fred Benninger (1917–2004), German-American businessman

== See also ==
- Henninger
