= LV Strip (Nevada gaming area) =

Nevada Gaming Control Board reporting area

The LV Strip is one of the designated Nevada Gaming Control Boards reporting areas. It consists of the Las Vegas Strip casinos and many of the surrounding casinos. The Strip earns roughly 50% of the gaming revenue from all sources for the state of Nevada.

For the previous 12 months ending 31 August 2009, the Las Vegas Strip earns 83.6% of the pit revenue in Clark County, and 50.6% of the gaming revenue from other sources (slot machines, sports bet, parimutuel, etc.).

Penny slot machines is the only categories of gaming devices where revenue is increasing. After decades of being the top earning game in the pit, blackjack was surpassed by baccarat for the previous 12 months ending 31 August 2009. In August 2009, the game of baccarat was responsible for over 50% of the pit gaming revenue for the Strip which surpassed the game's contribution in February during Chinese New Year.

Since 1999, non-gaming revenue at the Strip casinos exceeds gaming revenue. In more traditional gaming areas like Downtown Las Vegas or Laughlin gaming is still the primary revenue source.

== Gaming revenue of Strip casinos ==
Financial information is provided to show where the source of gaming revenue comes from (slots revenue, vs. pit revenue, etc.). Data is contrasted for the year ending October 2007 when revenue peaked. The other-pit category is all the other table games like Bingo, Keno, Let it Ride, Mini-Baccarat, Pai-Gow Poker, 3-Card Poker, Caribbean Stud, Sports Book, Racing Book, and so forth.

Gaming Revenue in USD Thousands For Year Ending:
Source	30 Nov 2009	31 Oct 2007
Twenty-One	$741,594	$1,078,626
Baccarat	$891,597	$970,726
Craps	$251,635	$318,855
Roulette	$260,515	$303,385
Other-PIT	$475,885	$663,137
Poker	$85,596	$97,114
Slots	$2,815,438	$3,513,608
Total	$5,522,260	$6,945,451

The year ending August 2009 is the first year that Baccarat has had higher revenue than Twenty One (or Blackjack). Although Baccarat is played in other areas of Nevada besides the Strip, 99.2% of the Baccarat revenue in the state is from the Strip.

Aria Casino had not yet opened in FY09.

Las Vegas Strip Casinos with Gaming Revenue over $72 million per year
Independent	MGM Mirage	Caesars Entertainment Corporation
Wynn Resorts	Bellagio	Caesars Palace
The Venetian	MGM Grand Las Vegas	Harrah's Las Vegas
Palace Station	Mandalay Bay Resort and Casino	Flamingo Las Vegas
Palms Casino Resort	Luxor Las Vegas	[[]]
Westgate Las Vegas	Excalibur Hotel and Casino	Imperial Palace Hotel and Casino
Treasure Island Hotel and Casino	New York-New York Hotel & Casino	Bally's Las Vegas
Gold Coast Hotel and Casino	Park MGM	Paris
	The Mirage	Planet Hollywood Resort and Casino

- Palazzo operated under the same license as the Venetian for this year.

Las Vegas Strip Casinos with Gaming Revenue under $72 million per year
$36–$72	$12–$36	$1–$12
Tropicana	Oyo Hotel & Casino	Ellis Island
Riviera	Airport Slot Concession	Wild Wild West
Sahara	Casino Royale	Casuarina
Virgin Hotels Las Vegas	Slots-A-Fun	
Tuscany		
Bill's Gamblin' Hall		
Terrible's		
Circus Circus Las Vegas		

- The Nevada Gaming Commission's definition of the LV Strip reporting area includes casinos surrounding the Strip.

Clark County Casinos with Rooms (over $1m) for fiscal year 2008
Category	Per Room	Revenue	Rooms	Rented	Occup
Strip > $72m	$156.41	$3,797,326,096	25,529,460	24,277,794	95.1%
Strip < $72m	$89.78	$272,680,274	3,493,628	3,037,058	86.9%
Rest of County	$61.47	$618,206,516	12,672,369	10,056,881	79.4%

- The gaming abstract as published only says there are 38 casinos that are in the Gaming Commission's definition of the Strip, the individual names of those casinos are not published since it is not permitted under state law.
- At least 9 of the 23 casinos currently on the over $72 million list existed before 1989. Some of the older casinos, like the Tropicana in previous years may have earned more than $72 million a year in gaming revenue, but have since dropped below that amount. The gaming commission does not adjust the $72 million from year to year.
- Outside of the Strip there are 22 licenses in the rest of the state of Nevada that earn more than $72 million per year apiece in gaming revenue. The casinos locations are: 1 in Lake Tahoe, 5 in Reno, 3 in Laughlin and 13 in other parts of the Las Vegas urban area such as downtown Las Vegas, Summerlin, North Las Vegas, Henderson and Paradise.

=== North Strip ===
The North Strip is the unofficial name of the first mile of Las Vegas Blvd. just outside the Las Vegas City Limits, corresponding to Winchester, Nevada. This section of the Strip currently includes five budget resorts, like the Sahara Hotel, Circus Circus Las Vegas, Slots-A-Fun Casino, the Riviera Hotel and Casino and the Greek Isles Hotel and Casino. Collectively they have less than 200 table games, 4200 slots, 31 poker tables and less than 8000 hotel rooms. Also numerous time shares have been built in this region.

The North Strip was planned to be rebuilt as an upscale gambling district comparable to center Strip. Billions of dollars were invested in land speculation. The former Stardust Resort & Casino and New Frontier Hotel and Casino were imploded in anticipation of new development.

Many new resorts Las Vegas Plaza, Crown Las Vegas, Echelon Place, an unnamed joint MGM & Kerzner project, and the Fontainebleau Resort Las Vegas planned for development, but all these projects are in various stages of bankruptcy or incomplete status. In addition a major redevelopment and expansion of the Sahara Hotel and Casino and the Stratosphere Las Vegas were put on hold.

The Triple Five Group was in the process of trying to assemble 27.3 acres (110,000 m^{2}) of North Strip land just south of the Riviera Casino. By April 2008, they had acquired 13.7 acres (55,000 m^{2}) at a cost of $380 million. They applied to the FAA for height clearance for eight 572' towers.

Another project announced was the construction of a Marriott Marquis on land currently occupied by a Residence Inn and a Courtyard Inn belonging to Marriott corporation.

The Fontainebleau Resort Las Vegas was the most visible failure as it topped out the tallest building in Las Vegas before going bankrupt. Initial offers for selling the uncompleted tower are far less than the raw land value from two years ago. The Echelon also got as far as erecting steel girders up as high as the eighth floor for several buildings. The owners, Boyd Gaming sold the property to the Malaysian company Genting. They plan on opening Resorts World Hotel and Casino in 2018. The style will be Chinese themed.

=== Casino revenue in fiction ===
In the movie Ocean's Thirteen, the lead character, Danny Ocean, is describing a new ultra-luxurious casino opening on the Strip. He states that the big casinos on the Strip take in $3 million a day just from the casino floor, and this new resort is aiming for $5 million. In reality, the two largest corporate operations in Las Vegas, MGM Mirage and Harrah's Entertainment, in the first quarter of 2009, brought in $5.9 million and $4.1 million per day, respectively, in gaming revenue alone, but this was from all their Las Vegas Strip resorts combined. MGM Mirage currently owns nine Strip resorts, and Harrah's owns eight with one being a minor property originally intended to be a tear-down. No single casino operation has ever brought in close to $3 million a day from the casino floor alone, and the NVGC uses the qualification of greater than $200,000 per day ($72 million per year) as a grouping for reporting purposes.

=== Distribution of total revenue of Strip casinos high to low ===
The Nevada Gaming Commission (NGC) publishes annual information about total revenue including gaming, hotel rooms, food & beverage, and attractions. If the casinos are numbered with #1 being the highest grossing casino then the following show the total revenue, for the period 1 July 2008 through 30 June 2009.

TOTAL REVENUE (GAMING + etc.)

- $759,063,730 is revenue for casino #6
- $571,415,161 is average of casino #10 and #11
- $390,381,914 is revenue for casino #12
- $266,022,372 is revenue for casino #18
- $246,291,317 is average of casinos #20 and #21

The NGC does not publish data for individual casinos. But based on the size, age, and relative luxury of the casinos an analyst can guess the top six.

- Venetian & Palazzo operated under one license
- Wynn Casino (Encore had not opened yet)
- Caesars Palace
- Bellagio
- MGM Grand Hotel
- Mandalay Bay & THE Hotel operated under one license

Harrah's Entertainment Corporation only reports aggregate numbers for regions, but their flagship property, Caesar's Palace, is clearly the biggest moneymaker in their portfolio. Harrah's earns 54% of their revenue from the casinos, unlike MGM-Mirage which earns 38% of their revenue (before promotional allowances) from the casino floor.

Harrah's & MGM Yearly Earnings from Las Vegas Properties
Company	2009	2008	2007	2006
Harrah's	$2,698.00	$3,254.30	$3,626.70	$3,267.20
MGM	$4,656.87	$5,889.08	$6,473.79	$6,227.77

Both companies are experiencing 20% drops for Calendar Year 2009 vs 2008. MGM-MIRAGE sold their Strip casino Treasure Island in 2009. The revenue from TI for a portion of 2009 is not included in the total. Revenue reported by MGM-Mirage for the year ending 31 December 2004 for top Las Vegas casinos owned at this time. Mandalay Bay, Luxor, Excalibur, Circus Circus, and Monte Carlo were acquired at a later date.

MGM Casino	#	Revenue from 2009	Revenue from 2004
Bellagio	1	$1,064,729	$1,068,517
MGM Grand LV	2	$976,261	$860,778
Mandalay Bay	3	$725,129	
The Mirage	4	$624,132	$566,276
Luxor	5	$344,722	
Excalibur	6	$265,076	
New York-New York	7	$250,055	$337,198
Monte Carlo	8	$206,377	
Circus Circus	9	$200,385	
Total		$4,656,866	

=== Change in revenue ===
The revenue for the Strip is contrasted with that of the state of Nevada. Gaming Revenue went flat for 3.5 years from July 2000 through January 2004, partly because of the downturn after 9/11. For the four years from January 2004 to January 2008 gaming revenue increased by a third. During this time, the only new casino to open on the Strip was Wynn Resort, and a new hotel tower opened on Mandalay Bay. Several dozen new casinos were planned. Finally, when the Palazzo casino opened in January 2008, gaming revenue was starting to fall. The Palazzo was followed by Palms Place, Trump Tower, Wynn Encore, The Cannery, The M Resort, and the yet to open MGM City Center and Fontainebleau. Also numerous new condominiums, and hotel towers were added to existing casinos.

Multi Year Stats for Total Revenue
Data through 30 July 2009

In fiscal year 1990 (1 July 1989- 30 June 1990), the Commission reported a total of 13 casinos on the Strip that earned more than $72 million per year in gaming revenue. The first modern mega-resort, The Mirage, opened about halfway through this fiscal year and the Rio All Suite Hotel and Casino opened 8 weeks later. Presumably some of the casinos in this category have since been imploded in favor of newer resorts. At that time the average gaming revenue was $129.2 million per year and non-gaming revenue was $97.8 million (for an average of $227 million total revenue). Non-Gaming revenue has since surpassed gaming revenue for the Las Vegas Strip.

In 2008 Cash sales of Food and Beverage come fairly close to covering the raw cost of sales, and the departmental expenses. In 1990 both food and beverage were sold at a loss. Complimentary food and beverage is shown as well (everything relative to the raw cost of sales).

In 1990 Room Sales only slightly exceeded departmental expenses and complimentary rooms. In 2008 room sales far exceed expenses and comps. Amounts are shown in millions of dollars. The statistics are contrasted with those of Downtown Las Vegas where cash sales are still not much higher than the departmental expenses plus the cost of the comped rooms.

== Hotel / casino development construction bulletin ==
The Las Vegas Convention Center website posts a monthly update to the planned construction for the Las Vegas metropolitan area for the future. In the four years between 2003 and 2007 there was a cumulative addition of 1,444 rooms to Las Vegas. The major openings were Wynn Las Vegas and THE Hotel at Mandalay Bay, which were offset by the implosion of several resorts like New Frontier, The Stardust, Bourbon Street, and Castaways. During the same four years visitor volume increased by 3.66 million or 10.3% and gaming revenue in Clark county increased by $3 billion or 38.8%. On many weekends there was insufficient room supply to meet demand. However, once the new rooms opened the recession hit.

Las Vegas Construction for 2008–2012
Name of Property	Location	Completion	Cost (Millions)	Convention (Sq Ft)	Timeshares	Rooms
TOTAL 2008:			$6,642	209,644	1,268	8,661
TOTAL 2009:			$11,606	557,622	1,121	8,627
TOTAL 2010:			$3,925	226,000	400	3,993
TOTAL 2011:						107
TOTAL 2012:						97

Las Vegas Construction for 2008 and 2009
Name of Property	Location	Completion	Cost (Millions)	Convention (Sq Ft)	Timeshares	Rooms
The Palazzo Resort; Hotel Casino	3339 Las Vegas Blvd S	17-Jan-08	$1,900			3,066
MGM Grand Hotel & Casino expansion	3799 Las Vegas Blvd South	25-Jan-08		92,000		
Marriott's Grand Chateau phase 2	75 E Harmon Ave	29-Feb-08			200	
Nevada Palace closure	5255 Boulder Highway	29-Feb-08				-104
Odgen House closed for redeveloping	651 Ogden Ave	29-Feb-08				-101
Trump International Hotel and Tower Las Vegas	2000 Fashion Show Dr	31-Mar-08	$600	2,460		1,282
Palms Place	4321 West Flamingo	31-Mar-08	$650	2,500		400
MonteLago Village; Resort expansion	30 Strada Di Villaggio	10-Apr-08		3,829		
Homewood Suites by Hilton	230 Hidden Well Rd	8-May-08		1,500		147
World Mark III, The Club	5275 W. Tropicana Ave.	15-May-08			208	
Microtel Inn & Suites phase 2	55 E. Robindale Rd.	13-Jun-08		1,000		35
South Point Hotel expansion	9777 S. Las Vegas Blvd	28-Jul-08	$95	10,000		807
Tahiti Village; Vacation Club phase 2	7200 Las Vegas Blvd South	15-Aug-08	$135		510	--
Staybridge Suites	5735 Dean Martin Drive	27-Aug-08				118
Eastside Cannery (Site of Nevada Palace)	5255 Boulder Hwy	28-Aug-08	$250	20,000		307
Bluegreen Club #36	372 E. Tropicana	28-Aug-08			350	120
Aliante Station Casino and Hotel	215 & Aliante Pkwy	11-Nov-08	$662	14,000		202
Hampton Inn Las Vegas North	Speedway 2852 E. Craig Rd.	15-Dec-08		650		96
element Las Vegas Summerlin	10555 Discovery Drive	18-Dec-08	$25	441		123
Hampton Inn & Suites; Las Vegas Airport	6575 S. Eastern Ave.	18-Dec-08	$25	1,264		129
Encore Las Vegas	3131 Las Vegas Blvd S	22-Dec-08	$2,300	60,000		2,034
TOTAL 2008:			$6,642	209,644	1,268	8,661
Comfort Inn & Suites	475 Marks St.	1-Jan-09				127
M Resort, Spa, and Casino	12300 Las Vegas Blvd South	1-Mar-09	$1,000	60,000		390
Cabana Suites (formerly Odgen House)	651 Ogden Ave	4-May-09	$6			64
The Grandview at Las Vegas tower 4	9940 Las Vegas Blvd S	17-May-09			400	
Marriott TownePlace Suites	1471 Paseo Verde	17-Jun-09				112
Caesars Palace expansion	3570 Las Vegas Blvd S	13-Jul-09		110,000		
Hard Rock Hotel expansion and redevelopment	4455 Paradise Road	31-Jul-09	$750	60,000		490
Marriott Spring Hill Suites; Henderson/Green Valley	1481 Paseo Verde	1-Sep-09				120
Marvin Garden closure	5125 S. Swenson Rd.	30-Sep-09				-250
Airport Inn & Suites closure	5100 Paradise Rd.	30-Sep-09				-100
Marriott Spring Hill Suites; Las Vegas Convention Center	2989 Paradise Rd	14-Oct-09		4,522		299
Golden Nugget expansion	129 E. Fremont St	20-Nov-09	$150			500
CityCenter (MGM Mirage)	67 acres (270,000 m^{2}) on west side of LVB		$8,500			
Vdara Hotel & Spa	2600 W. Harmon Ave	1-Dec-09		10,000		1,495
Mandarin Oriental	3752 Las Vegas Blvd	4-Dec-09		12,000		392
ARIA Resort & Casino	3730 Las Vegas Blvd	16-Dec-09		300,000		4,004
Planet Hollywood; Towers by Westgate	3667 Las Vegas Blvd South	28-Dec-09	$1,200		721	480
Holiday Inn Las Vegas	4055 Palos Verdes St.	28-Dec-09		1,100		129
Hard Rock Hotel expansion and redevelopment	4455 Paradise Road	28-Dec-09				375
TOTAL 2009:			$11,606	557,622	1,121	8,627

Since so much was constructed in 2008 and 2009 there is very little planned for the near future.

Las Vegas Planned Construction as of 4 November 2009
Name of Property	Location	Completion	Cost (Millions)	Convention (Sq Ft)	Timeshares	Rooms
Planet Hollywood Towers by Westgate	3667 Las Vegas Blvd South	Q1 2010		35,000		0
La Quinta Inn & Suites	Las Vegas Airport South 6560 Surrey	May-10		4,000		140
Marriott SpringHill Suites	Craig& Frehner	Jun-10				96
Wingate by Wyndham	315 W. Warm Springs	Mid 2010				209
The Grandview at Las Vegas tower 6	9940 Las Vegas Blvd S	Jul-10				400
Hampton Inn & Suites	SE corner of Sunset Rd. & Grier Dr.	Fall 2010	$25	2,500		150
The Cosmopolitan Resort & Casino	3708 Las Vegas Blvd S	Late 2010	$3,900	167,000		2,998
The Harmon Hotel & Spa (CityCenter)	Within CityCenter development	Late 2010		17,500	400	
TOTAL 2010:			$3,925	226,000	400	3,993
Marriott Courtyard	Tropicana & 215	Sep-11				107
TOTAL 2011:						107
Marriott SpringHill Suites	Tropicana & 215	Nov-12				97
TOTAL 2012:						97

Because the timeline is unknown the report omits the Fontainebleau Resort Las Vegas which is already topped out, but is currently in bankruptcy. Also the Echelon Place which is built as far as steel framing, but is on indefinite hold.
