= Emerald River Resort =

Unfinished Las Vegas resort project

Emerald River
- Interactive map of Emerald River
- Location: Casino Drive, Laughlin, Nevada, U.S.; 35.125531°N 114.599788°W
- No. of rooms: 6,100 (original plans)
- Signature attractions: Emerald River Golf Course
- Casino type: Land-based

Emerald River is an unfinished resort project in Laughlin, Nevada. It was proposed by developer John Midby in 1988, and would have included four hotel-casino properties, as well as other features such as a shopping mall. The total project would cost $800 million, and would cover 394 acres (159 ha).

Emerald River was to be built in phases over a 10-year period, but financial problems put a halt to construction in 1990, before completion of the first phase. Two towers, rising 7 and 14 stories, have been left unfinished since then. An 18-hole golf course was the only feature to reach completion, operating from 1990 to 2005.

Las Vegas developer Nick Azouz purchased the property during the 2000s, and planned to finish the project as a golf course community, accompanied by a hotel-casino. However, financial problems also prevented these plans from materializing.

== History ==
=== Original plans ===
Emerald River was proposed in July 1988, by developer John Midby. At the time, Laughlin had eight hotel-casino properties with a total of 4,344 rooms. Emerald River would consist of four new hotel-casino properties, adding 6,100 rooms to the city's inventory. The four resorts would be developed on 394 acres (159 ha), located along Casino Drive and overlooking the Colorado River. One of the four hotels, planned by Midby's Orion Land Development Company, would include 1,100 rooms in two towers. The four hotels would be linked by a 1,000,000 million sq ft (93,000 million m^{2}) shopping mall. Emerald River would also include an amphitheater, convention space, nightclubs, restaurants, and a golf course.

Emerald River had an estimated cost of $800 million, which would make it Nevada's most expensive hotel-casino project up to that point. It would be built in phases over a 10-year period, with the first originally expected to open in late 1989 or early 1990. The first phase would be built on 27 acres (11 ha), at a cost of $130 million. McCarthy Construction, based in Phoenix, Arizona, was the general contractor. Construction of the golf course was underway in November 1988. A year later, the Emerald River project received a $133 million construction loan from the Canadian Imperial Bank of Commerce. A subsidiary of the Japan-based JDC Corporation also joined McCarthy as a construction partner.

The 18-hole Emerald River Golf Course opened in February 1990, and was ranked by the United States Golf Association as the most difficult course in Nevada. It was the only component of the Emerald River project to reach completion. Construction on the remainder of the first phase – the 1,100-room hotel-casino – was halted in September 1990, due to financial problems. Poor economic conditions, including the collapse of the junk bond market, left Midby with no money to complete the project. Two towers, rising 7 and 14 stories, sat as unfinished concrete shells, after more than a year of construction. Although the 14-story tower had reached its top floor, the smaller structure was meant as a 23-story building.

The Emerald River site included 110 acres (45 ha) owned by the Colorado River Commission of Nevada. The project did not advance far enough for the developers to make a purchase on the commission's acreage. Paine Webber foreclosed on other land a few years after the project was halted, and the company held ownership into the next decade. Bank of America also owned a portion of the site.

=== Later plans ===
Nick Azouz, a Las Vegas developer, purchased the golf course, the unfinished towers, and undeveloped land in 2001. He established Riverside Developments LLC to take ownership of the land and to finish the project, serving as the company's president. Azouz's purchase included 275 acres (111 ha). In 2002, he offered $3.8 million to buy the remaining acreage owned by the Colorado River Commission, although the agency considered this offer too low, with its own appraisals coming in at around $4.5 million.

Laughlin's gaming industry had been hurt in recent years by the rise of Native American casinos in Arizona and California. Azouz hoped to reverse this by finishing the Emerald River project as a golf course community, accompanied by a hotel-casino. Although his proposal was supported by local residents, the commission in 2003 decided to reject his offer for the remaining acreage, instead choosing to study the land and determine the best use for it. Azouz said he would proceed with his project on the land he already owned, albeit with modifications. The town's namesake, Don Laughlin, was disappointed by the commission's decision: "That was unfortunate for Laughlin. The more productive he could make the property, the better it could be for the community. What's good for him is good for the community."

Laughlin's real estate market saw improvement over the next two years, prompting the commission to put its land up for sale at a price of $13 million. Riverside Developments purchased it in 2005, for a total of 385 acres (156 ha). The golf course closed later that year, when the operator's lease expired. The commission had determined that there was demand for more housing in Laughlin, as many workers commuted from nearby Bullhead City in Arizona. In addition to a hotel-casino, Riverside's plan for the property also featured a marina and more than 1,300 residential units, including houses, townhomes, and timeshares. The unfinished towers would be completed as condominium buildings.

In 2006, Azouz sold 7 acres of the site, and also agreed to sell another 17 which included the unfinished towers. However, the second sale was never finalized, leading to litigation between Azouz and the prospective buyer. Azouz never followed through on redevelopment, due to poor economic conditions caused by the Great Recession. County inspectors continued to carry out monthly exams of the towers, which were well preserved due to the area's dry desert climate.

The project was on indefinite hold as of 2011, and Azouz sold his interest to investors five years later. The two towers, still considered structurally sound at that time, remain unfinished.

== See also ==
- Echelon Place
