= Nevada Gaming Control Board =

State gambling regulator

Gaming Board overview
- Jurisdiction: State of Nevada
- Headquarters: 7 State of Nevada Way Las Vegas, NV 89119
- Gaming Board executive: Mike Dreitzer, Chairman
- Website: Nevada Gaming Control Board

Map

The Nevada Gaming Control Board (NGCB or SGCB), previously known as the State Gaming Control Board, is a Nevada state governmental agency that licenses and regulates gaming and enforcement of Nevada gaming laws throughout the state, along with the Nevada Gaming Commission. The Nevada Gaming Control Board's Enforcement Division is the law enforcement arm of the Nevada Gaming Commission. It was founded in 1955 by the Nevada Legislature.

== Board of directors ==
The NGCB board is composed of three members appointed by the governor. Board members serve four-year terms in a full-time capacity.

In May 2026, board member George Assad, who has called for reinstating parts of Regulation 6A (removed in 2007), proposed forming an NGCB whistleblower program, to help curtail extensive money laundering in casinos.

== Divisions ==
- Administration Division
- Audit Division
- Enforcement Division (staffed by sworn law enforcement officers)
- Investigations Division
- Tax and License Division
- Technology Division

== Gaming revenues and collections ==
The control board reports monthly gaming revenues and collections by established areas:

- Clark County
  - LV Strip
  - Downtown
  - North Las Vegas
  - Laughlin
  - Boulder Strip
  - Mesquite
  - Balance of County
- Washoe County
  - Reno
  - Sparks
  - North Lake Tahoe
  - Balance of County
- South Lake Tahoe
- Elko County
  - Wendover
  - Balance of County
- Carson Valley Area
- Other

According to data released by the State Committee for Game Control, casino revenue in Nevada showed monthly growth for the first time during 2019, with 1.04 in revenues. $1.4 billion was collected from players across the state in July 2023. In February 2025, the NGCB reported a significant 22.45 percent revenue increase in Las Vegas Strip casino revenues during the previous month, compared to January 2024.

== 2024 Virgin Hotels Las Vegas strike ==
On December 4, 2024, the Board met with 700 striking workers who were members of the Culinary Workers Union and employed at the Virgin Hotels Las Vegas. A new, five-year contract was reached the following month, ending the two-month strike.

== See also ==
- List of law enforcement agencies in Nevada
