= Eadington =

Eadington is a surname. Notable people with the surname include:

- Joan Eadington (born 1926), British author
- William R. Eadington (1946–2013), American economist
