= Henry Gluck =

- Born: 1929 (age 96–97); Europe
- Education: University of Pennsylvania
- Occupations: Business executive, philanthropist
- Spouse: Arline Gluck

Henry Gluck (born 1929) is an American business executive and philanthropist from Los Angeles, California. He was the president of Monogram Industries from 1969 to 1972. He served as the chairman and chief executive officer of Caesars World from 1983 to 1994. He also served as co-chairman of Transcontinental Properties from 1995 to 2003, and helped develop the new community of Lake Las Vegas in Nevada. He supports many philanthropic organizations in Los Angeles, and serves as chairman of the Ronald Reagan UCLA Medical Center.

== Life and career ==
=== Early life ===
Henry Gluck was born in 1929 in Europe. He grew up in Philadelphia, Pennsylvania. He graduated from the University of Pennsylvania, where he received a Bachelor of Science in economics, finance and international trade.

=== Career ===
He joined Monogram Industries in the 1950s. The company, which sold industrial products, was listed on the New York Stock Exchange. Gluck was president from 1969 to 1972. He then served on the boards of directors of the Cordura Corporation, Growth Realty, Daylin, the Gibraltar Savings and Loan Association, Metal Box America, and the Sheraton Hotel Corporation.

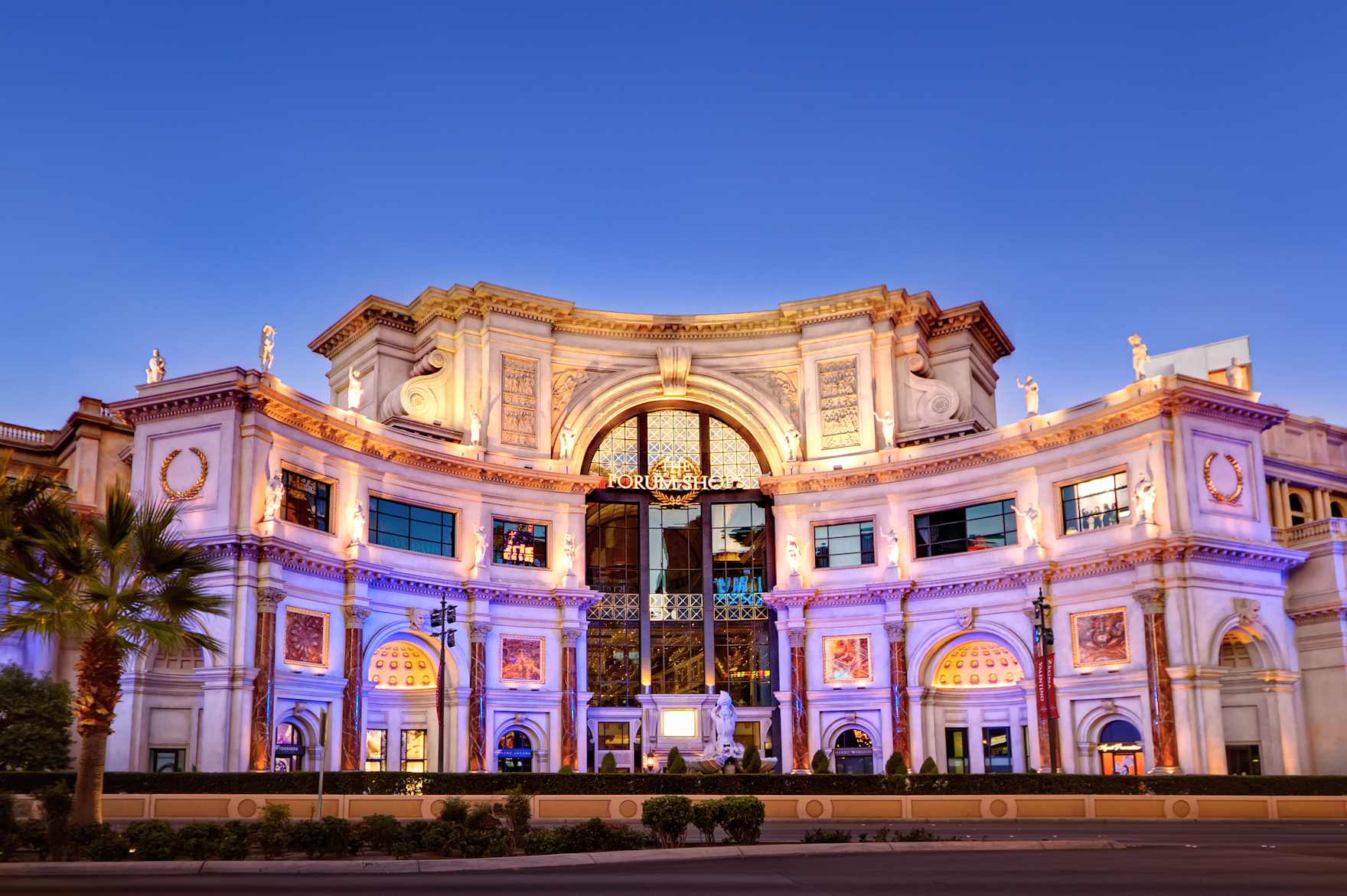
The Forum at Caesars

In 1982, he joined the board of directors of Caesars World, the operator of the Caesars Palace, a luxury hotel in Las Vegas, Nevada. A year later, in 1983, he became its chairman and chief executive officer. The casino was losing money at the time, and he was the one who suggested the idea of a mall with luxury boutiques and gourmet restaurants to boost growth. It was his wife, Arline, who gave him the idea, as she was bored when she visited him in Las Vegas. This idea led to The Forum Shops at Caesars, one of the highest-grossing malls in the United States. He also added a room for football and horseracing gamblers. Additionally, Gluck expanded Caesars World's presence in Lake Tahoe and in Windsor, Ontario, Canada. He also rejected a bid by Martin T. Sosnoff, an investor from New York City, to purchase the company. He was inducted into the Gaming Hall of Fame in 1993. Gluck eventually stepped down in 1994, when the company was acquired by the ITT Corporation, on whose board of directors he served. However, he retired from ITT's board in 1995.

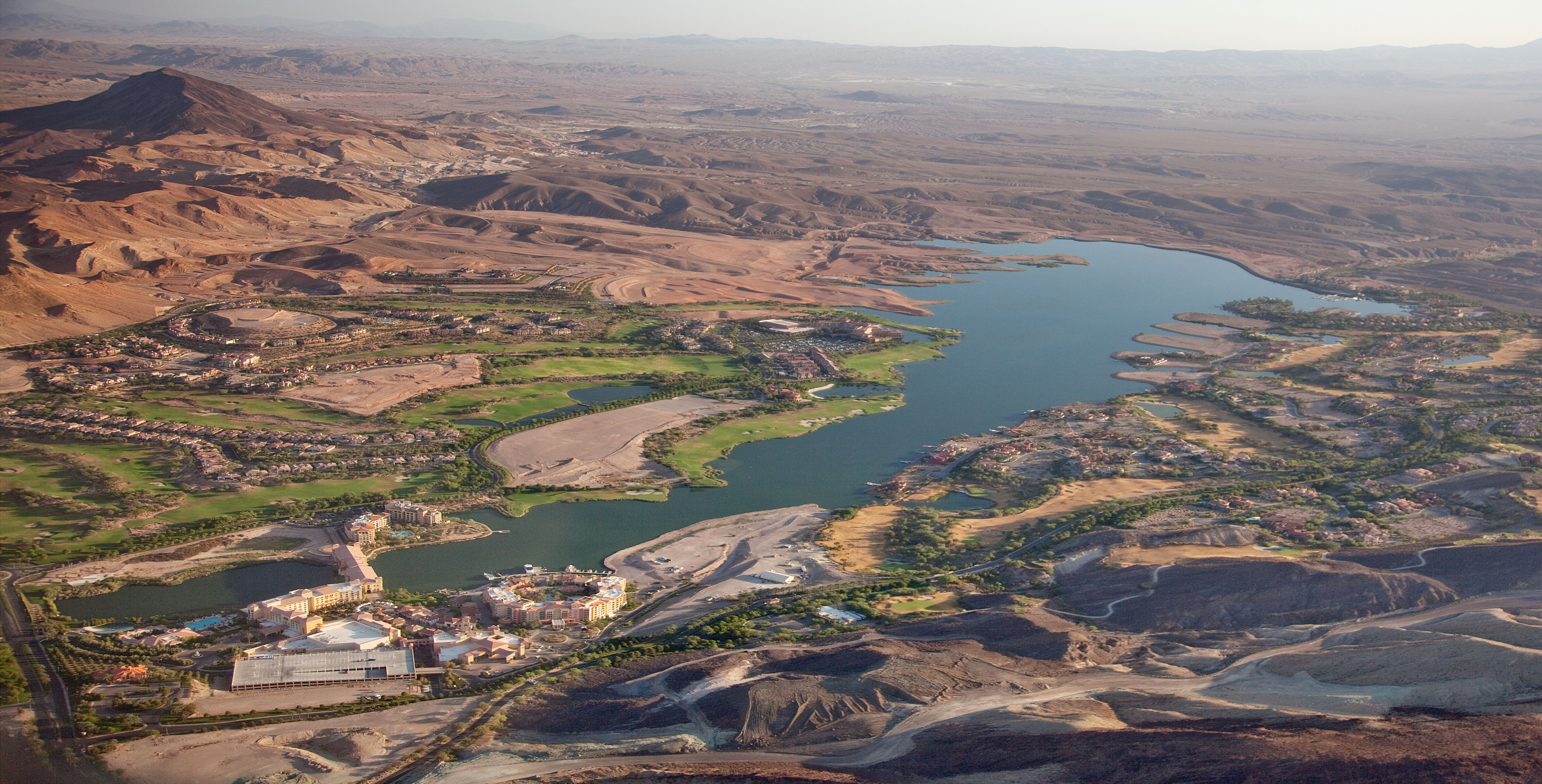
Lake Las Vegas

Later that year, in 1995, he became co-chairman of Transcontinental Properties, a real estate development company which developed Lake Las Vegas. The construction of the new community, located southeast of Las Vegas, cost US$5 billion. It was developed with Sid Bass and Lee Bass, two billionaires from Fort Worth, Texas. Gluck stepped down as co-chairman in 2003.

Gluck served on the board of directors of California Pizza Kitchen from 2003 to 2008.

=== Philanthropy ===
He has served on the National Council of the Salk Institute and on the board of trustees of the City of Hope. He is a major donor to the Los Angeles Philharmonic. Additionally, he has been a donor to the Los Angeles Jewish Home and to Veterans Park Conservancy.

He has served on the Board of Advisors of the Ronald Reagan UCLA Medical Center since 2001. Since 2009, he has served as its chairman. He also serves on the board of trustees of the Business Institute of Gerontology of the Ethel Percy Andrus Gerontology Center at University of Southern California.

=== Personal life ===
He is married to Arline Gluck. They reside in Bel Air. He is an avid tennis player
