= Silver Rider Transit =

Transit agency in southern Clark County, Nevada

- Parent: Southern Nevada Transit Coalition
- Founded: 2002
- Headquarters: Laughlin
- Service area: Rural Clark County
- Service type: Bus; Paratransit
- Routes: 8 Fixed Route
- Destinations: Laughlin, Mesquite, Sandy Valley, Las Vegas
- Website: https://sntc.net/

Silver Rider Transit is a public transportation operator in Clark County, Nevada, United States. Silver Rider Transit operates in the rural portion of Clark county, with focus cities of Laughlin and Mesquite.

== History ==
Silver Rider Transit was incorporated in 2002, as a part of Nevada's DOT public rural ride program under the name Southern Nevada Transit Coalition.

In 2008, Silver Rider Assumed transit operation for Boulder City.

In 2010, Silver Rider Transit opened Harry Reid Transportation Center in Laughlin, honoring Senator Harry Reid, since Reid helped secure 3.5 million in funding for the transportation center. The previous transportation center was located with the Las Vegas Metropolitan Police Department substation-jail.

In February 2022, Silver Rider Transit acquired hybrid electric buses for its Laughlin bus routes under a Federal grant facilitated by Nevada DOT.

== Services ==
=== Demand response ===
==== Boulder City Transit ====
Silver Rider offers a daily Dial a Ride Service in Boulder City, that is open to all. Reservation in Boulder City isn't required.

==== Indian Springs Express Route ====
In Indian Springs, Silver Rider operates a weekly Dial a Ride service, open to all, that takes residents from Indian Springs to user indicated drop off location in Las Vegas. Dial a Ride in Indian Springs requires 24 hour advance reservation

==== Laughlin Transit ====
In Laughlin, Silver rider offers Senior Dial a Ride services over the age of 60, to medical destinations in Bullhead City, AZ.

==== Social Security Express ====
Social Security Express is a Dial a Ride service that operates once a month. It is available to take Laughlin residents to the Needles Social Security office. Appointment to the Needles Social Security office is required.

== Routes ==
Route	Location	Service Area
Route 333	Mesquite	Travels counter clockwise from the Mesquite Walmart to Mesquite City Hall
Route 444	Mesquite	Travels counter clockwise from the Mesquite Walmart to Bunkerville
Route 777	Laughlin	Travels counter clockwise from SNTC Terminal to the Laughlin residential area, via South Casino Drive
Route 888	Laughlin	Travels clockwise from SNTC Terminal to the Laughlin residential area, via South Casino Drive
Las Vegas Express	Laughlin	Deviated fix bus route that travels from SNTC Terminal to RTC Bonneville transit center. Return trips from Las Vegas Start from RTC South Strip Transit Center. Operates on Weekdays only.
Searchlight Express	Searchlight	Deviated fix bus route that travels from Searchlight to Bullhead City, servicing Searchlight, Cal-Nev-Ari, and Palm Gardens. Allows Transfer with Bullhead Area Transit at Riverview Mall. Operates every other Tuesday
Sandy Valley & Goodsprings Express Route	Sandy Valley	Travels from Sandy Valley, to the Las Vegas Galleria Mall. With stops in Goodsprings and Jean. Allows Transfer to RTC transit system from the South Strip Transit center. Operated twice per week.
Mesquite Express Route	Mesquite	Operates once per week. From the Mesquite Walmart, to the Las Vegas Town Square. Allows transfer to RTC Transit in the Bonneville Transit Center. This route allows for deviated bus route service, upon request to the North Las Vegas VA hospital and transfer to the RTC South Strip Transfer terminal.
