= Lake Las Vegas =

Man-made lake in Nevada, United States

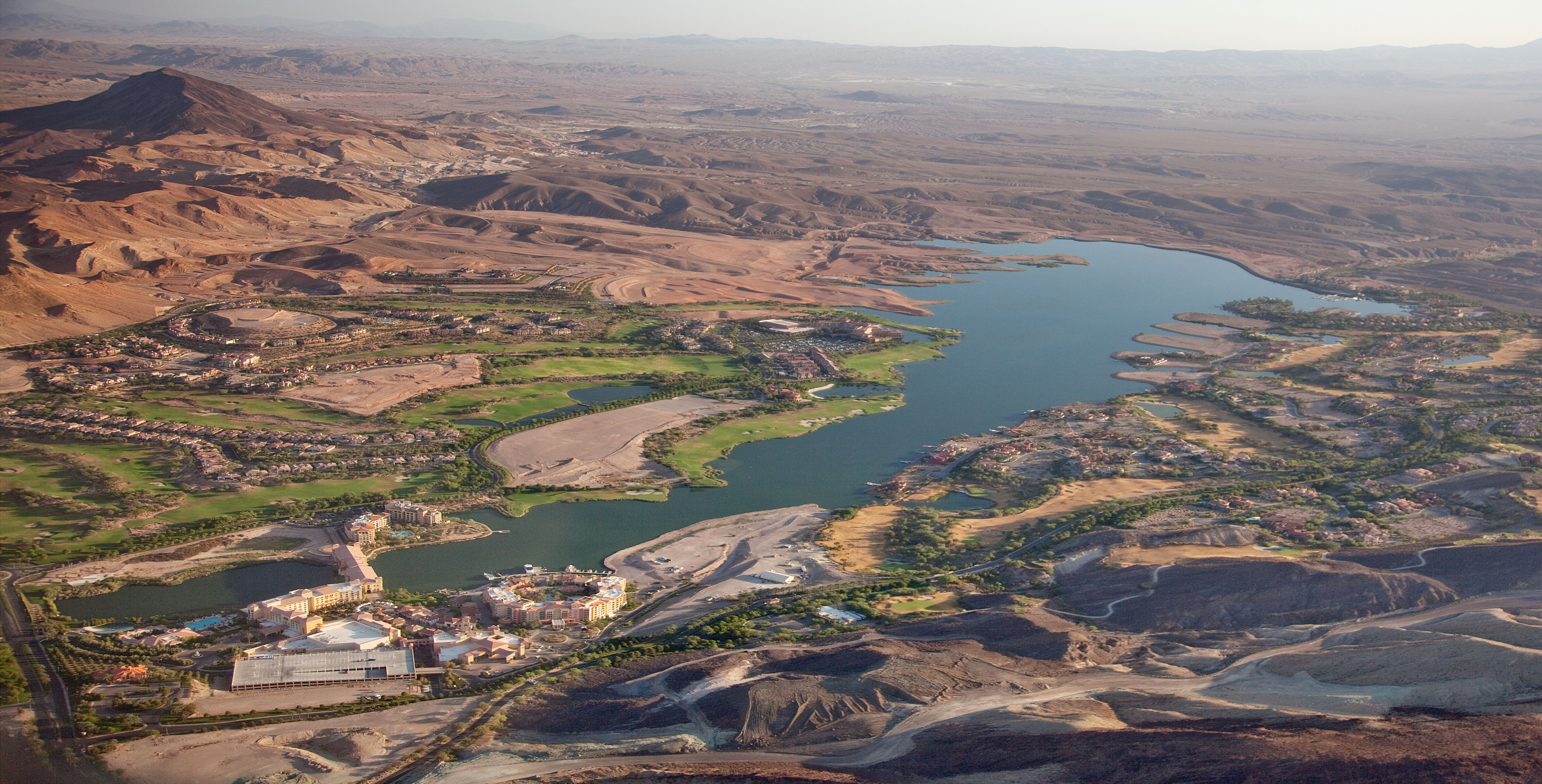

- Location in Nevada
- Location: Henderson, Nevada
- Coordinates: 36°06′07.2″N 114°55′46.2″W
- Type: Reservoir
- Primary inflows: Former: WWII BMI Pipeline, raw Lake Mead water (through 2022). Current: SNWS treated water from Lake Mead (after 2022 due to shutdown of BMI pipeline), Secondary: Up to 2000 AFY stormwater flow from Las Vegas Wash.
- Primary outflows: Las Vegas Wash, golf course irrigation, evaporation
- Catchment area: nil
- Basin countries: United States
- Surface area: 320 acres (130 ha)
- Shore length^{1}: 10 mi (16 km)
- Surface elevation: 1,400 ft (427 m)
- Islands: 0
- Settlements: Lake Las Vegas
- Website: https://lakelasvegas.com/
- ^{1} Shore length is not a well-defined measure.

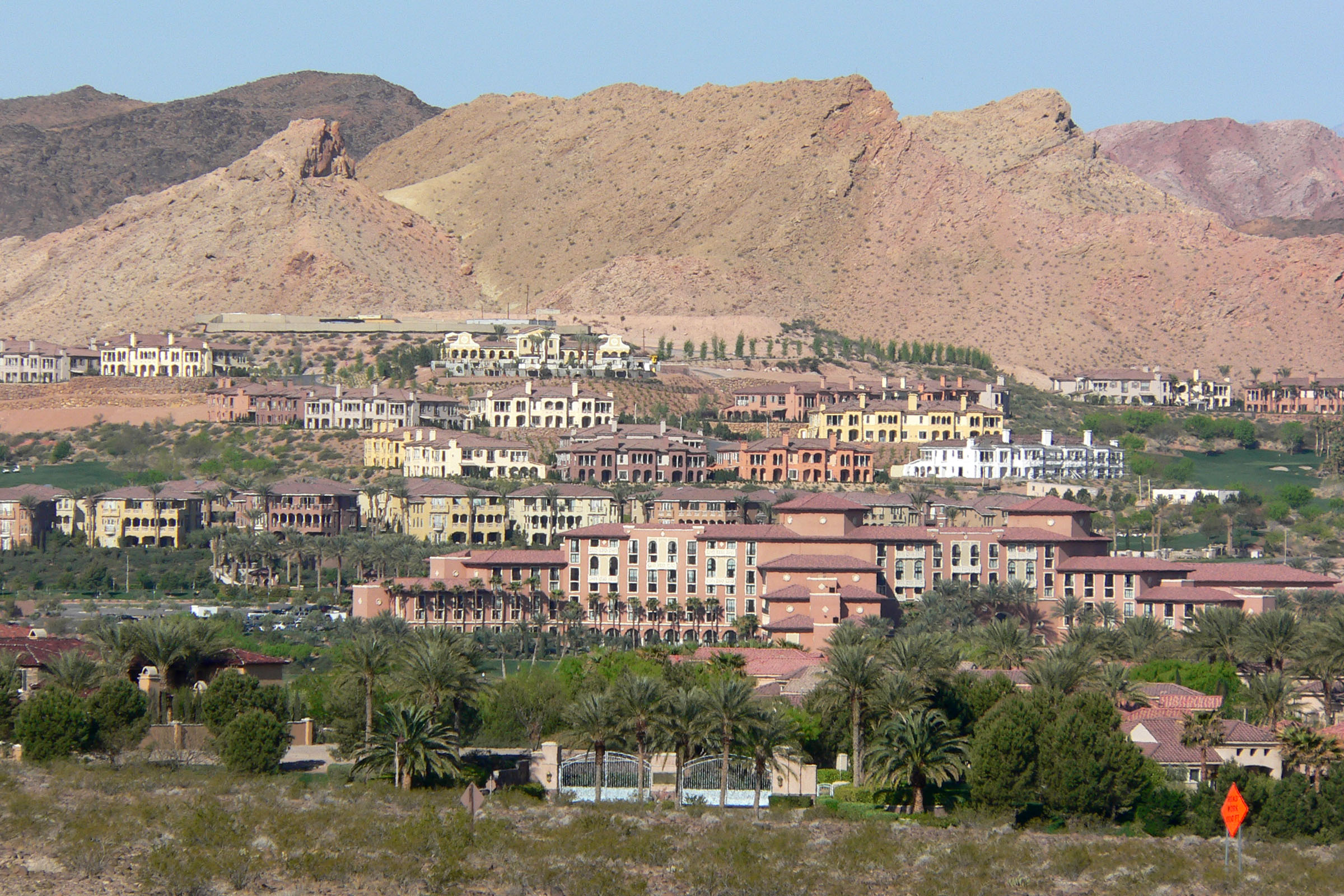
Lake Las Vegas in 2007

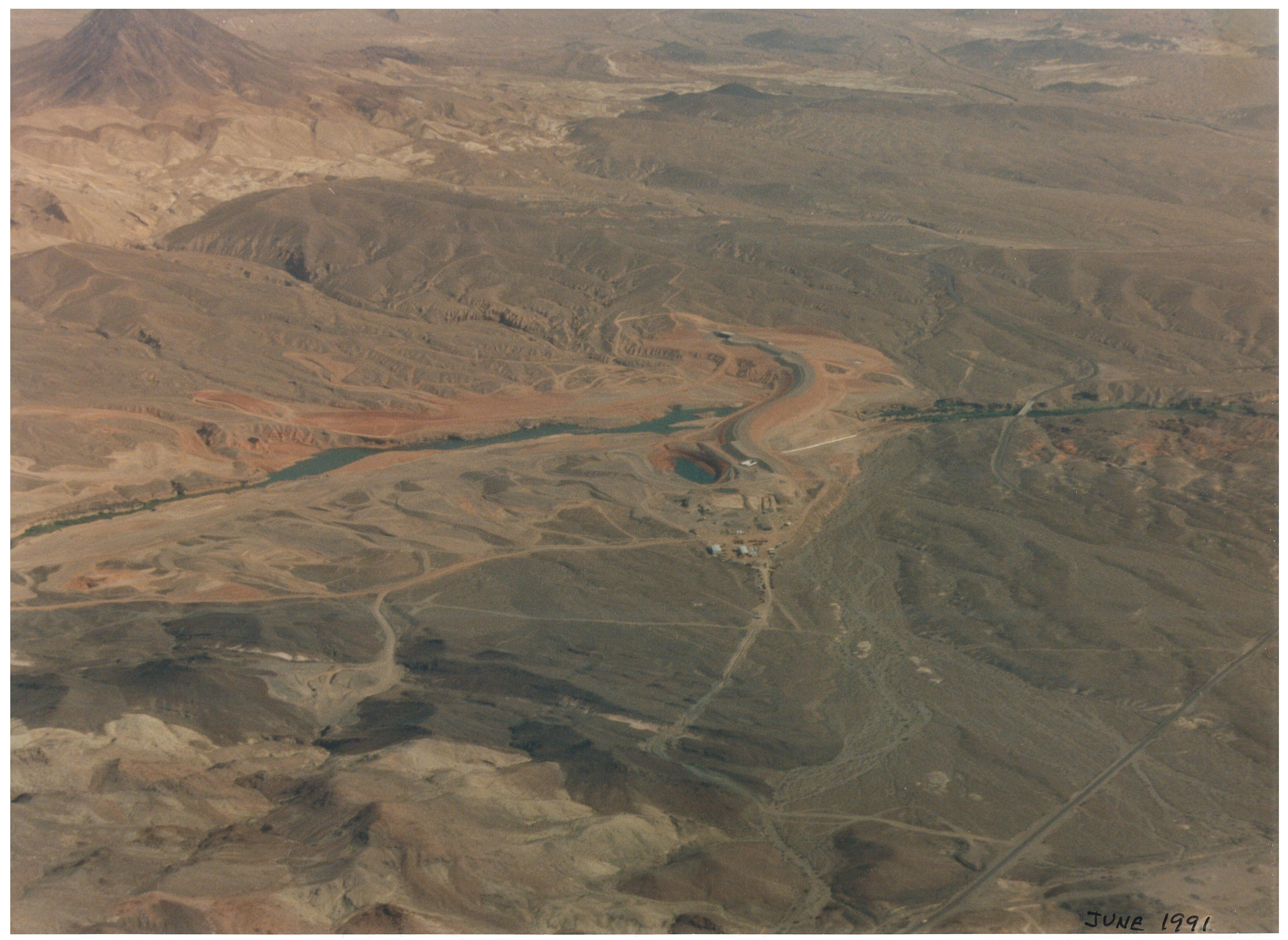
State Eng Final inspection completed in May 1991, fill commenced in June

Lake Las Vegas is a 320-acre (130 ha) reservoir in Henderson, Nevada, with a 3,592-acre (1,454 ha) developed area around it. The area is sometimes referred to as the Lake Las Vegas Resort. It is being developed by 5 companies, including Lake at Las Vegas Joint Venture LLC.

The area includes three resorts including the Aston MonteLago Village Resort, the Westin Lake Las Vegas Resort, and the Hilton Lake Las Vegas.

== Overview ==
The earthen impoundment that forms the reservoir is 192 ft (59 m) tall, 4,800 ft (1,500 m) in length, and 716 ft (218 m) wide at its base. It contains roughly the same amount of dirt as Hoover Dam does concrete, and impounds 10,000 acre-feet (12,000,000 m^{3}) of water. Since the reservoir was built in the channel of the Las Vegas Wash – the valley's only storm runoff outlet – a bypass was built for the wash beneath the reservoir and dam allowing it to remain connected to Lake Mead via two 84-inch (2.1 m) diameter pipes. After falling into substantial disrepair, the pipes – which are owned by the city of Henderson, but maintained by the resort – were repaired in 2009 at a cost of $3 million. Above the entrance to the bypass is a flood control structure, which permits excess flood waters of the Las Vegas Wash to be diverted into Lake Las Vegas.

== History ==
In 1965, J. Carlton Adair, acting for The Port Holiday Authority, acquired 160 acres on the shore of Lake Mead within the National Park Service (NPS) boundary. This was land that was overlooked and not acquired by the government for the Lake Mead impoundment. The NPS had serious objections to Adair's planned resort development and attempted to block his entry. Eventually legislation was passed in congress to facilitate a land exchange. Adair would exchange the Lake Mead shoreline acreage for 2243 acres of land in the Las Vegas Wash abutting the NPS. The exchange was for the express purpose of construction of a dam and lake with resorts. This project was to be called Lake Adair. The land was annexed into the city of Henderson, and legislation was passed by the Nevada legislature that would change the name of Henderson to the City of Lake Adair when the lake was filled.

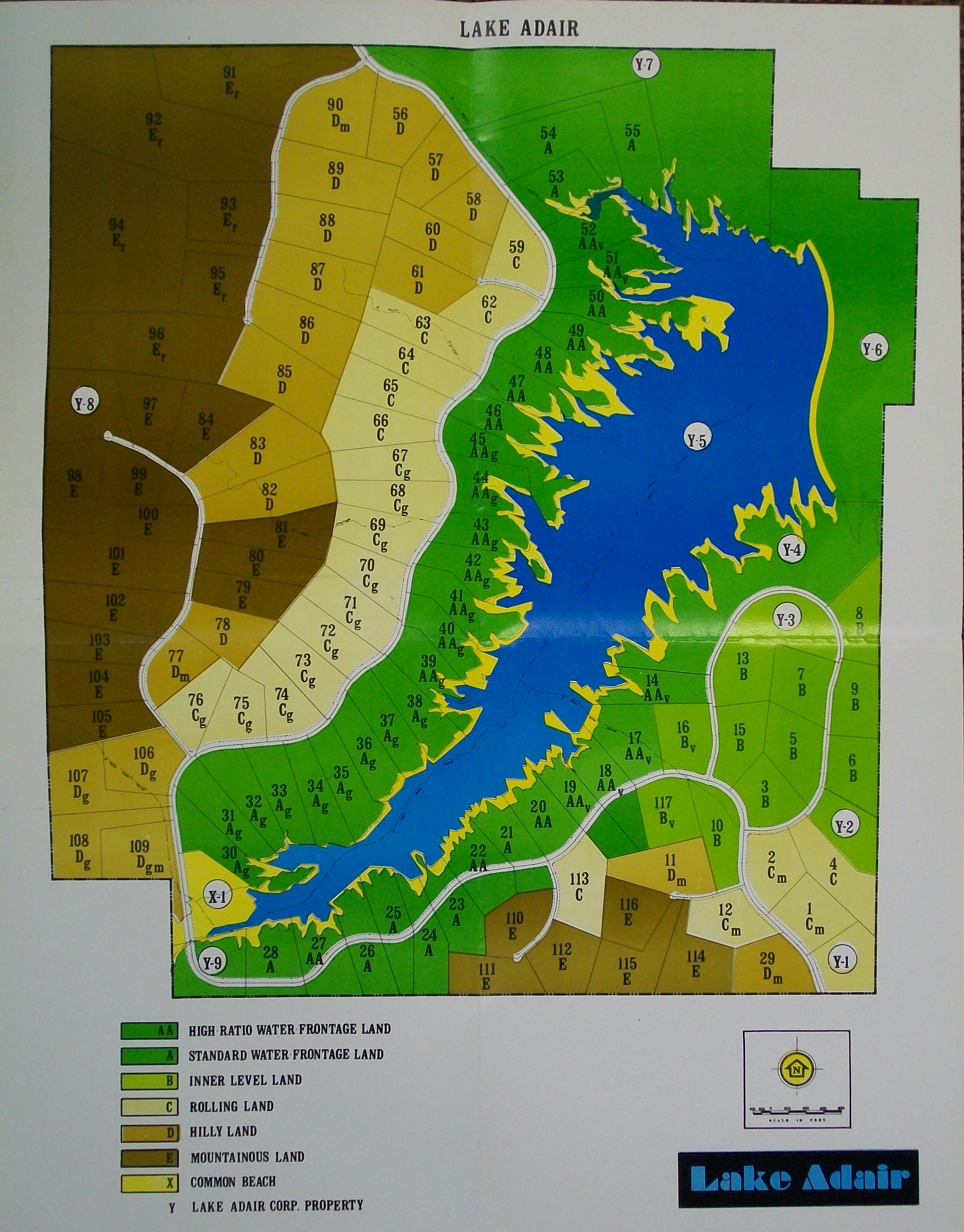
Lake Adair land Use Plan

In 1967 Adair hired Tipton and Kalmbach (T&K) to design the dam and bypass pipelines for Lake Adair but was unable to obtain sufficient financing. He split the property into small "shares" in exchange for deposits. Barry Silverton (Pacific Malibu Development Corporation) met with the now numerous land owners and reassembled the project as Lake At Las Vegas. Silverton began the planning, permitting and design process and retained T&K to update the design for the dam and bypass pipeline system. Unable to find financing for the project, in 1987 Silverton sold controlling shares of the project to Transcontinental Properties run by Ronald Boeddeker. Silverton was finally bought out by Transcontinental Properties. Transcontinental Properties continued the arduous approval process for construction of the dam and bypass system. The project had many political opponents with clout at high levels.

Washington Construction was hired as the prime contractor for the project which was to be a Union project. The twin 84" Dia Bypass pipes are reinforced concrete manufactured by hydroconduit in Henderson Nv. Finally, in 1991, following the State Engineers final inspection of the dam, diversion began through the WWII era BMI pipeline to provide raw Lake Mead water to fill the reservoir. The State Engineer, Mike Turnipseed, approved the application by Steve Ainsworth, LLV Chief Project Engineer, on behalf of LLV, for 2000 Acre-Feet per year of stormwater rights. This permitted LLV to replace evaporation losses with runoff during storms. All stormwater runnoff would otherwise be lost to the State of Nevada when it entered Lake Mead and the Colorado River, which are federal waters.

In 1995, Henry Gluck, the former chairman and chief executive officer of Caesars World, became the co-Chairman of Transcontinental Properties. With Sid Bass and Lee Bass, two billionaires from Fort Worth, Texas, he developed the new community. The project cost US $5 billion.

Lake at Las Vegas Joint Venture, LLC filed for Chapter 11 bankruptcy on July 17, 2008, with their debts estimated at between $500 million and $1 billion. Lake Las Vegas emerged from bankruptcy in July 2010 with a plan that took nearly two years to complete. All existing debt was wiped away and the development has $30 million in hand to complete several of the unfinished infrastructure projects. The Lake Las Vegas bankruptcy creditors, not Lake Las Vegas development themselves, have filed a lawsuit against the former insiders (Bass Brothers, TransContinental, etc.). The creditors' theory is that the $500 million equity loan the former insiders took against the property caused the demise of Lake Las Vegas. The creditors are hoping to recoup money from the former insiders.

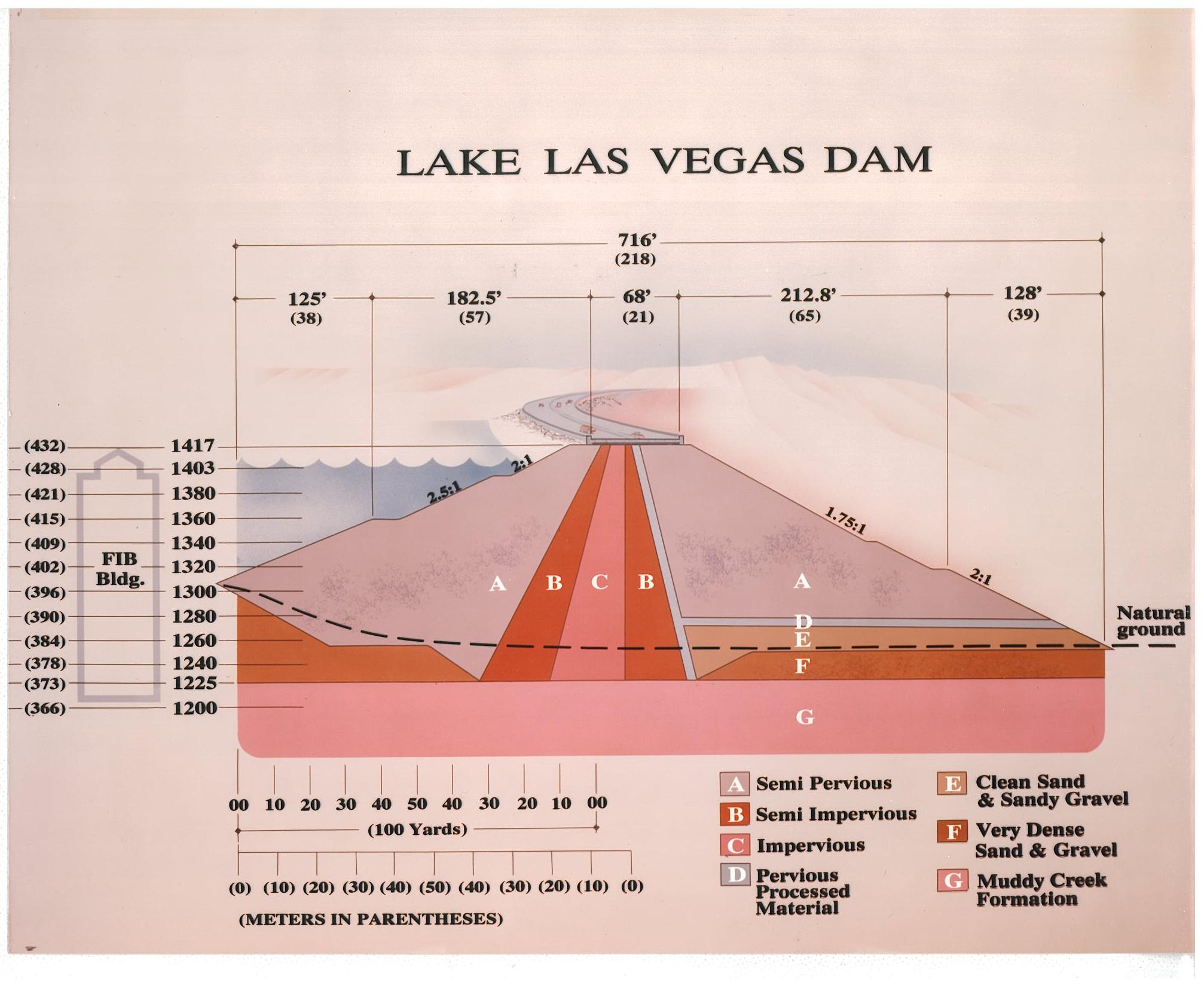
LLV Dam

In a related action, resort property owners are suing lender Credit Suisse as part of a multibillion-dollar lawsuit led by bankrupt Yellowstone Club founder Timothy Blixseth and his son Beau Blixseth who claim the Lake Las Vegas Joint Venture bankruptcy was caused by a "loan to own" scheme between the bank and resort developers. The golf course was purchased by Nevada South Shore LLC, a Hawaii-based corporation for $4.5 million on February 17, 2011. The Ritz Carlton, Lake Las Vegas, closed after 8 years of operation on May 2, 2010. The Ritz Carlton was then reopened by international boutique hotelier Dolce Hotels on February 11, 2011, as the Ravella at Lake Las Vegas. On April 30, 2013, Kam Sang Co. announced that the Ravella would be renamed the Hilton Lake Las Vegas, the name under which the hotel continues to operate. The Hilton opened June 6, 2013.

Lake Las Vegas was the subject of a lawsuit between investment fund Claymore Holdings and Credit Suisse, which was the agent for a syndicate of entities that loaned $540 million to develop the property. Claymore and others accused Credit Suisse of fraudulently inflating the value of the development in order to generate higher fees for itself. The core of the allegations centered on a new appraisal methodology conceived of by Credit Suisse executive David Miller, who in internal emails is referred to as Credit Suisse's Dr. Frankenstein. In 2015, a Texas judge ordered Credit Suisse to pay $288 million to Highland, Claymore and others. The verdict was partially offset by other payments to Highland, meaning that Claymore received most of the Credit Suisse judgment. That Judgment was reversed by the Texas Supreme Court in April 2020, and Claymore's Judgment was reduced to $26 million (plus interest).

In July 2022, decreasing water levels in Lake Mead caused the BMI water intake intake to become too shallow to operate and Lake Las Vegas began using potable water to maintain water levels.
