= Geoff Freeman =

American executive

- Born: 1974 (age 51–52)
- Education: University of California at Berkeley
- Occupations: President and CEO
- Employer: U.S. Travel Association
- Spouse: Patricia (Tita) Thompson Freeman
- Children: 3

Geoff Freeman (born 1974) is president and CEO of the U.S. Travel Association. He was previously the president and CEO of the Consumer Brands Association, and, prior to that, the president and CEO of the American Gaming Association (AGA).

== Career ==
Freeman's early jobs included working for The Heritage Foundation; Freddie Mac; and the American Association of Health Plans. From 2004 to 2006, he was a vice president at APCO Worldwide, a global public affairs firm.

In 2006, Freeman became the executive director of a new organization, Discover America Partnership, an advocacy group working to increase the number of foreign visitors to the U.S. In late 2007, that organization, the Travel Industry Association of America (TIA), and the Travel Business Roundtable announced their intent to merge. Discover America Partnership was absorbed by the TIA and became the U.S. Travel Association.

Freeman worked at the U.S. Travel Association until 2013 In October 2011 he was promoted from senior vice president of public affairs to executive vice-president and chief operating officer. During his time at the association, it nearly doubled its resources. He frequently appeared in the media and testified before Congress. Freeman also spearheaded a panel, led by former Homeland Security Secretary Tom Ridge that created the TSA PreCheck program, as a way to improve security and the travel experience.

In July 2013, Freeman became president and CEO of the AGA. His leadership resulted in the legalization of sports betting in May 2018, when the Supreme Court struck down the federal ban on sports wagering.

On August 1, 2018, Freeman left the AGA to become the president and CEO of the Grocery Manufacturers Association, now the Consumer Brands Association. Freeman launched a campaign to transform the Consumer Brands Association into an advocacy organization for the food, beverage and consumer products industry. In his last three years with the origination, revenues increased by nearly 50 percent.

In June 2022, Freeman resigned from the Consumer Brands Association to become president and CEO of the U.S. Travel Association.

== Personal ==
Freeman graduated from the University of California, Berkeley. His wife, Tita Thompson Freeman, was the senior vice president of communications and public affairs at the Business Roundtable. They reside in Arlington, Virginia, with their three children.
