= Showboat Hotel and Casino =

Hotel and casino in Nevada, United States

Coordinates: 36.153°N 115.112°W

- Interactive map of Showboat Hotel and Casino
- Location: Las Vegas, Nevada; 2800 Fremont Street
- Opened: September 3, 1954
- Closed: January 29, 2004; 22 years ago
- No. of rooms: 1,700
- Gaming space: 35,000 sq ft (3,300 m^{2})
- Casino type: Land
- Operating license holder: Station Casinos
- Renovated in: 1959, 1973, 1976, 2000

The Showboat Hotel and Casino, known as the Castaways Hotel and Casino from 2000-2004, was a hotel and casino located at the north end of the Boulder Strip in Las Vegas, Nevada. The hotel consisted of a 19 story tower containing 445 rooms, a casino and an adjacent RV park. The Castaways hotel was demolished on January 11, 2006 to make way for a new resort. However, construction never started on the project, and much of the property was redeveloped as the Showboat Park Apartments, opened in 2021.

== History ==
=== Showboat (1954–2000) ===
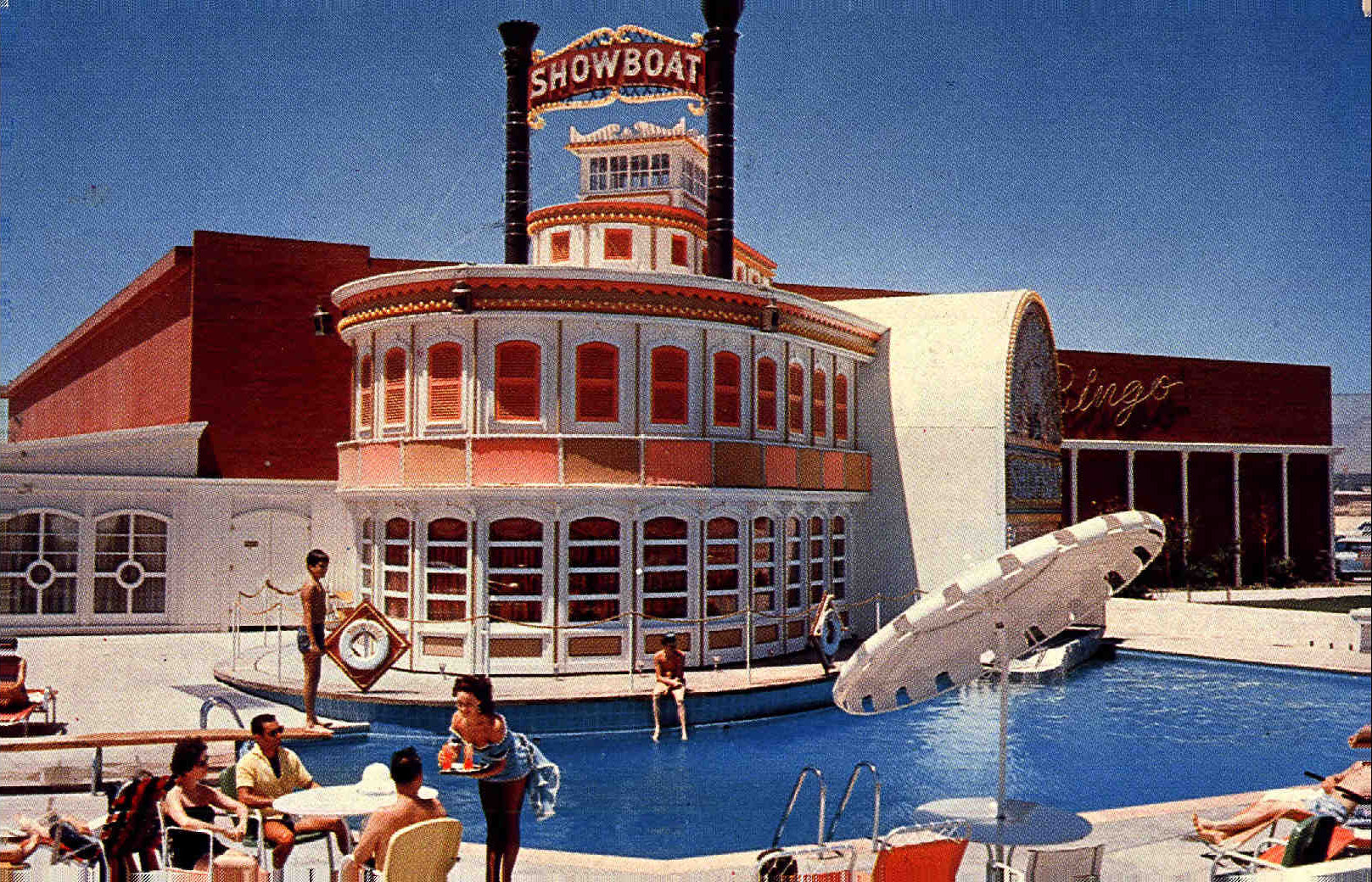
Showboat facade and swimming pool, seen in 1961

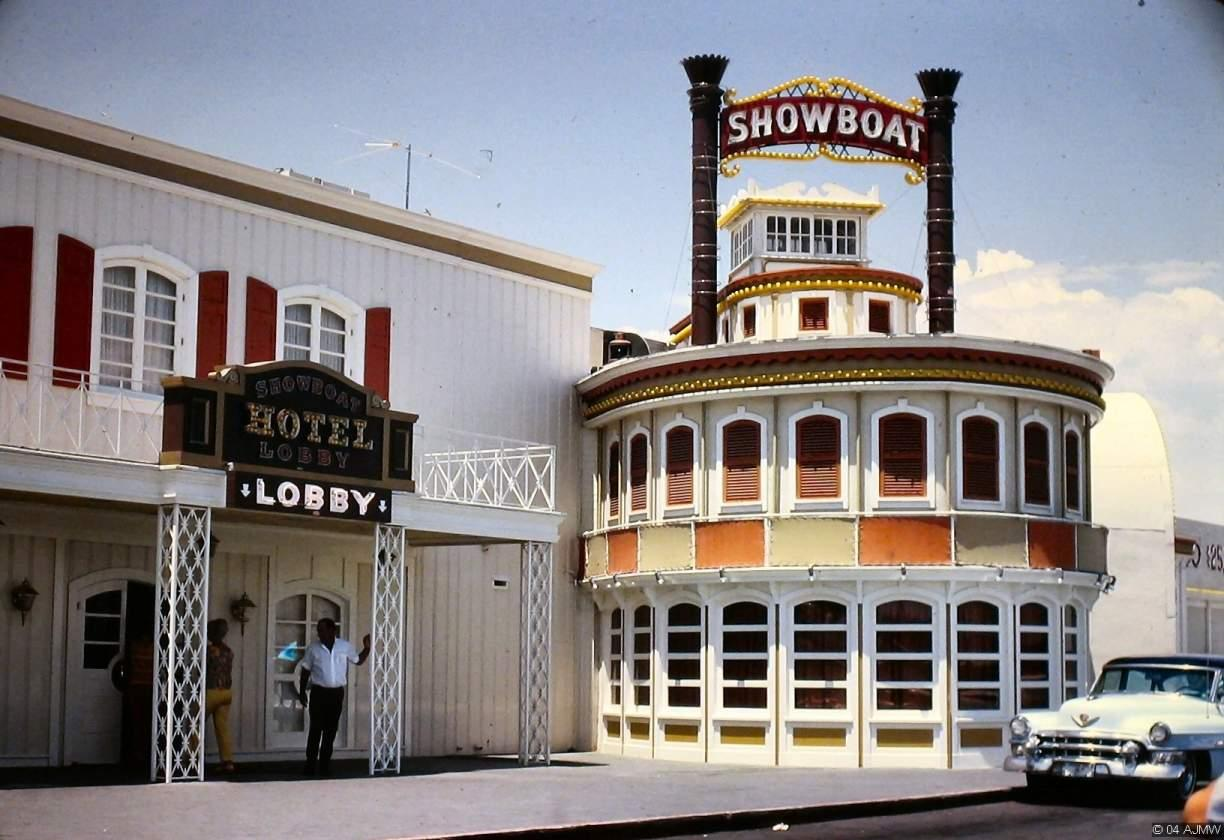
Showboat Hotel and Casino 1968

The Showboat was built by William J. Moore of the Last Frontier and J. Kell Houssels of the Las Vegas Club for $2 million. The first resort within Las Vegas city limits, it had 100 rooms on two floors. While Moore and Houssels ran the hotel, the casino was leased by a group of managers from the Desert Inn, including Moe Dalitz. The Showboat opened on September 3, 1954. After several unsuccessful years, Joe Kelley took over management, and began successfully targeting local customers with forty-nine cent breakfast specials and other promotions.

Kelley added a bowling alley in 1959, which soon became the Showboat's signature attraction, hosting nationally televised PBA tournaments. Showboat bowling leagues were organized in Los Angeles and Phoenix, offering winners free trips to Las Vegas for championship events. By 1979, the bowling alley grew to 106 lanes, making it the nation's third largest.

A 19-story hotel tower was built in two phases, with the first nine floors opening by 1973, and the remainder in 1976, bringing the property to a total of 500 rooms.

In the early 1980s, a large unused space on the second floor was converted into the Showboat Sports Pavilion, which hosted American Wrestling Association events and Los Angeles Thunderbirds roller derby matches, and competed with Caesars Palace to book high-profile boxing matches. The Pavilion was later converted into a bingo hall.

The hotel was successful until the 1990s when it suffered the same fate as the downtown casinos, which were losing business to the new megaresorts on the Las Vegas Strip. Many visitors also believed that this casino was located on the Strip since the exterior of Harrah's Las Vegas resembled a showboat.

In 1998, Harrah's Entertainment bought Showboat, Inc. and sold the Showboat in 2000 for $23.5 million to VSS Enterprises, a group owned by Dan Shaw, Mike Villamor, and Greg Schatzman.

=== Castaways (2000–2004) ===
Harrah's refused to sell the Showboat name, not wanting the Las Vegas property to be confused with Showboat Atlantic City, so VSS renamed it as the Castaways.

The new owners never did well and according to the Associated Press, the facility was crippled by a downturn in tourism that occurred in the wake of the September 11, 2001 attacks. Discussions were held in 2002 to rebrand the property as a Holiday Inn and start a $57 million renovation and expansion, but these plans did not come to fruition. After VSS missed a payment on the property's $20 million mortgage, Vestin Mortgage began foreclosure proceedings in June 2003, prompting the Castaways to file for Chapter 11 bankruptcy protection, listing $50 to $100 million in debt. The property was allowed to remain open, until January 29, 2004, when the Bankruptcy Court determined that VSS was improperly spending money, and allowed Vestin to take possession of the Castaways, shutting it down.

Vestin agreed to sell the property for $21.6 million to MGI Group, owners of the Bighorn and Longhorn casinos, who planned to rebrand it as La Joya del Sol and market it to Latino customers. Before MGI's license application could be approved; however, Station Casinos stepped in and paid MGI $12.1 million to take their place in the deal, paying Vestin the full $21.6 million.

Station Casinos was primarily interested in the site's grandfathered gaming license, soon determining that the existing structures were not usable and had construction quality problems. Demolition began in July 2005, and the hotel tower was imploded by Controlled Demolition, Inc. (CDI) on January 11, 2006.

=== Redevelopment ===
Station Casinos made plans for a $90 million casino and restaurant with a Spanish motif, named Castaways Station. By 2009, however, no progress had been made. Station, itself on the verge of bankruptcy, put the lot up for sale for $39.5 million, although it would remain unsold for years. To keep its development options open, the company allowed a portable casino to operate on the site. This is because of a loophole in the law that allows a gaming license to be renewed so long as a casino is on the property and open to the public for at least eight hours every two years.

In 2016, Station put the property up for sale again. Within a few years, the company sold 25 of the 30 acres to Amador Bengochea, a real estate developer. In 2021, Bengochea opened the Showboat Park Apartments on the property. He also developed a storage facility and a health district building on the site. Station, which operates a chain of Wildfire-branded casinos, opened a new location on its five remaining acres in 2023.
