= Showboat, Inc. =

- Industry: Casino; Entertainment
- Headquarters: United States
- Parent: Harrah's Entertainment

Showboat, Inc., a United States-based organization in the casino and entertainment industry, made its initial public offering in 1969. Later that year, Ramada Inns agreed to buy the company for $15 million in stock, but negotiations failed because of conditions set by Houssels, who wanted cash for his 24% stake.

Showboat, Inc. expanded over time, opening Showboat Atlantic City in 1987, Sydney Harbor Casino in 1995, and Showboat Mardi Gras in East Chicago in 1997.

In 1998, Harrah's Entertainment bought Showboat, Inc. for $1.15 billion. Harrah's interests were primarily in the Atlantic City and Chicago markets, however; the Showboat Hotel and Casino in Las Vegas did not fit with the company's strategy. The property was sold in 2000 for $23.5 million to VSS Enterprises, a group owned by Dan Shaw, Mike Villamor, and Greg Schatzman.
