= Laughlin, Nevada =

Unincorporated community in Nevada, US

- Unincorporated town
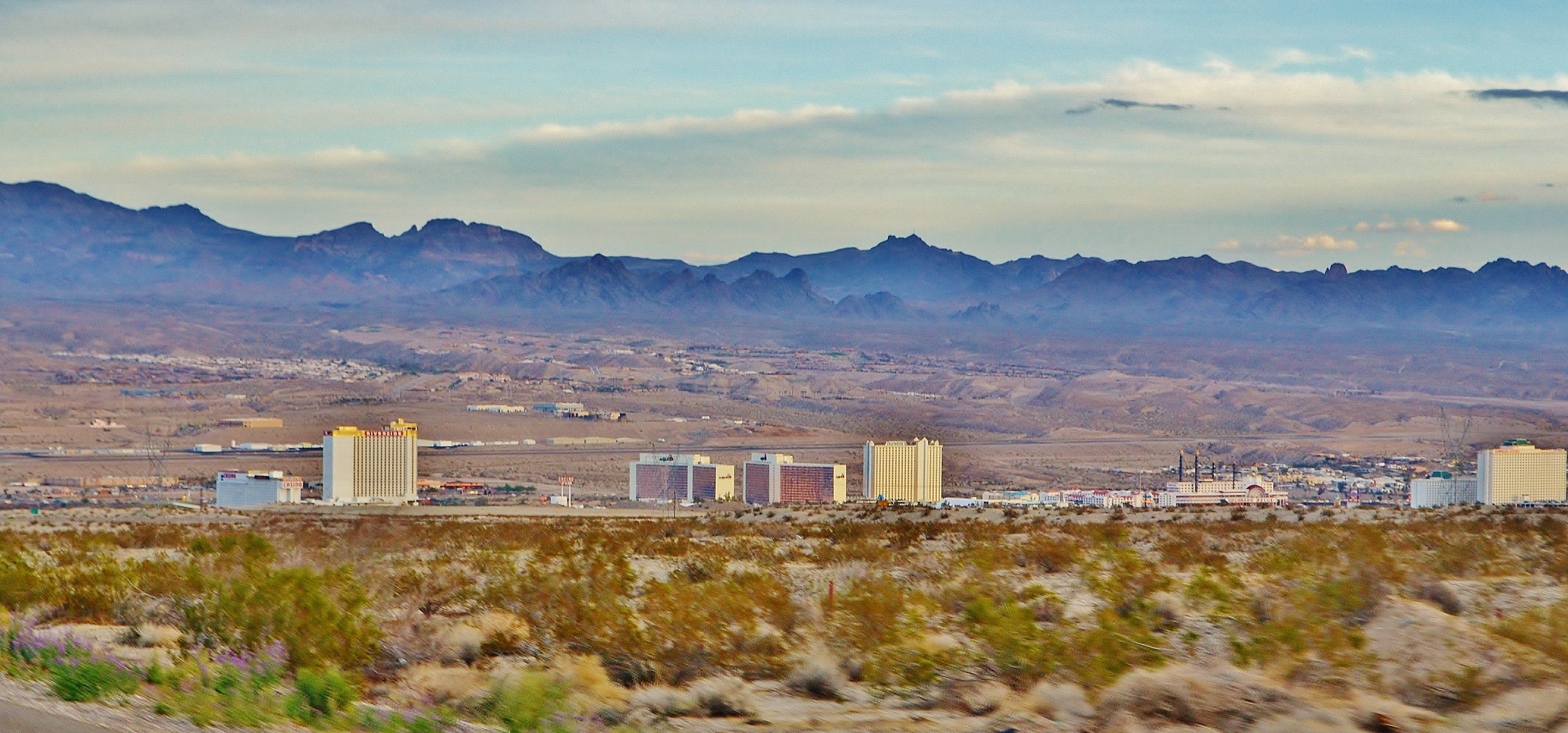
- View of Laughlin

- Location of Laughlin in Clark County, Nevada

- Location in the United States Location in Nevada
- Coordinates: 35°8′30″N 114°37′7″W
- Country: United States
- State: Nevada
- County: Clark
- Founded: 1964
- Named for: Don Laughlin

Area
  - Total: 17.33 sq mi (44.89 km^{2})
  - Land: 16.34 sq mi (42.33 km^{2})
  - Water: 0.99 sq mi (2.56 km^{2}) 1.55%
- Elevation: 560 ft (170 m)

Population (2020)
  - Total: 8,658
  - Density: 529.7/sq mi (204.52/km^{2})
- Time zone: UTC−08:00 (PST)
  - Summer (DST): UTC−07:00 (PDT)
- ZIP Codes: 89028–89029
- Area codes: 702 and 725
- FIPS code: 32-41000
- GNIS feature ID: 0856066

Laughlin (/ˈlɔːf.lɪn/) is an unincorporated community in Clark County, Nevada, United States. Laughlin lies 90 miles (140 km) south of Las Vegas, in the far southern tip of Nevada. As a resort town, it is known for its gaming and water recreation. As of the 2020 census, the population was 8,658. For statistical purposes, the United States Census Bureau has defined Laughlin as a census-designated place (CDP). It is located on the Colorado River, downstream from the Davis Dam and Lake Mohave, and directly across from the much larger Bullhead City, Arizona. The nearby communities of Bullhead City, Arizona; Needles, California; Fort Mohave, Arizona; and Mohave Valley, Arizona, bring the area's total population to about 100,000. Laughlin is also 286 miles (460 km) northeast of Los Angeles.

Laughlin was named for Don Laughlin, an Owatonna, Minnesota native, who purchased the southern tip of Nevada in 1964 (informally called South Pointe). At the time, Don Laughlin operated the 101 Club in Las Vegas. He opened what would become the Riverside Resort, and later wanted to call the community Riverside or Casino, but the post office opted for Laughlin instead.

== History ==
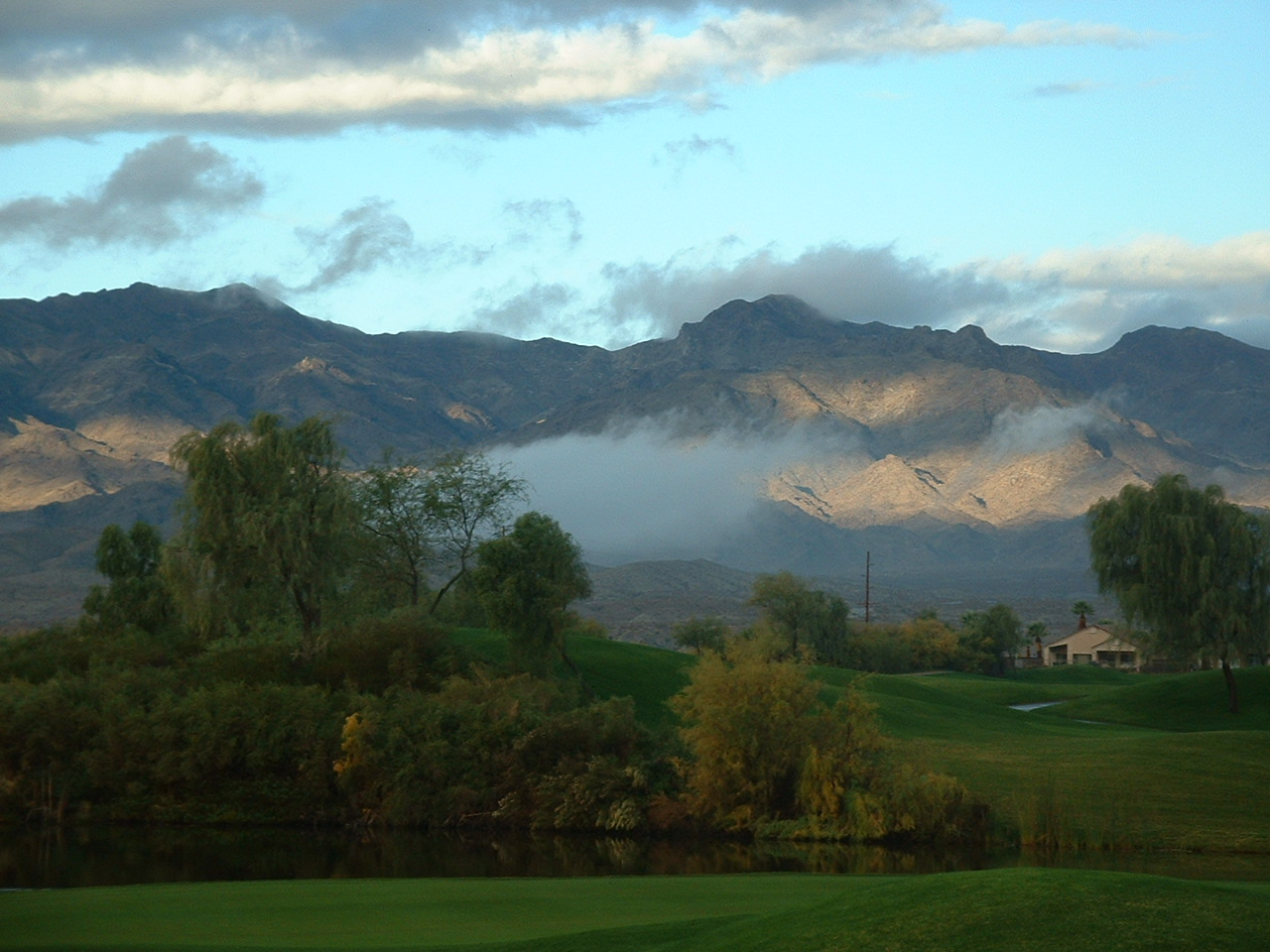
Avi Resort and Casino Golf Course in Laughlin in 2007

The townsite of Laughlin was established in the 1940s as South Pointe because of the proximity to the southern tip of the state of Nevada. The early town consisted of a motel and bar that catered to gold and silver miners, construction workers building Davis Dam, and fishing enthusiasts. In the 1950s, construction workers left, and the town functionally disappeared.

In 1964, Don Laughlin, owner of the 101 Club in Las Vegas, flew over the site and saw its tourism potential. He offered to buy the land, and within a few years, the Riverside Resort motel and casino, consisting of only 12 slots and two live tables, began operating. A second casino, the Bobcat Club, opened in 1967, where the Golden Nugget Laughlin currently operates. In 1968, a third casino, the Monte Carlo, opened its doors. The neighboring Bullhead City, Arizona was a key part in Laughlin's growth, with shuttle boats transporting customers from the Arizona side of the river to Laughlin's resorts and back. The southernmost tip of Nevada, along the Colorado River, where Nevada, California, and Arizona meet, was a major national tourist destination and gambling resort during the 70s, 80s & 90s.

In the 1980s, Laughlin was developed with the construction of several more hotels and casinos. The Colorado Hotel (now the Pioneer), The Regency, Sam's Town Gold River (now the Laughlin River Lodge), and The Edgewater opened in the early 1980s. Other investors saw the growth as an opportunity to get in on the action. A second boom resulted in the construction of The Colorado Belle, Harrah's Del Rio, and The Ramada Express (now The Tropicana Laughlin). In 1987, Don Laughlin funded and built the Laughlin Bridge at a cost of $3.5 million, which connected Laughlin to Bullhead City. He donated the bridge to the states of Nevada and Arizona. The bridge carries 30,000 vehicles daily. In 1988, a megaresort project called Emerald River was announced. The $800 million project would have included four hotel-casinos, but construction was halted in 1990 due to financing problems, leaving two unfinished towers. A golf course was the only aspect of Emerald River to be completed, operating from 1990 until 2005. The Flamingo Hilton, now known as The Aquarius, was built in 1990.

The Mohave Power Station opened in 1971, and closed down on December 31, 2005.

=== Incorporation attempts ===
In 2012, some residents disapproving of Clark County politics made a push to incorporate Laughlin as a city in order to stave off additional lost business opportunities, as well as gain local control. The proposal did not include Laughlin Casinos. When the proposal came to a vote in a referendum, the vote was 57 percent opposed to 43 percent in favor.

In 2019, Senate Bill 213 failed to pass the Nevada legislature’s Committee of Government Affairs, which would have made Laughlin a city without the consent of the voters. This would have given Laughlin representation on 9 of the 15 entities now providing services to the community

In 2021, Senate Bill 79 was introduced to allow for an election for incorporation in 2022. The Bill was sent to the Committee of Government Affairs where it failed to pass. Some local residents of the community also expressed concern that incorporation would make Laughlin unaffordable for senior citizens during the covid-19 pandemic. Others viewed it as an excuse to “raid” the Ft. Mohave Development Fund Senator Hardy, explained to community members in the March 9, 2021, meeting that the reason he introduced the bill was to provide better public safety services to a growing Laughlin. Currently, there are memorandums of understanding with Bullhead City for fire protection in Laughlin.

== Geography ==
According to the United States Census Bureau, the census-designated place (CDP) of Laughlin (which may not coincide exactly with the town boundaries) has a total area of 89.3 square miles (231 km^{2}), of which 88.0 square miles (228 km^{2}) is land and 1.4 square miles (3.6 km^{2}) is water.

Laughlin is one of the lowest-lying communities in Nevada, situated just 558 feet (170 m) above sea level.

=== Climate ===
Laughlin has a hot desert climate (Köppen climate classification BWh), with under six inches of precipitation per year. Summers are extremely hot with days frequently exceeding 110 °F (43 °C) in July and August while over-night lows tend to stay between 76–86 °F (24–30 °C). The winters are mild with days typically seeing temperatures between 65–75 °F (18–24 °C) and corresponding over-night lows between 43–52 °F (6–11 °C). It is one of the United States' hottest cities during the summer. Heat waves with high temperatures over 120 °F (49 °C) are unusual, but not unheard of. On June 29, 1994, Laughlin experienced the hottest temperature in Nevada state history at 125 °F (51.7 °C). At 10a the hardiness zone is the highest of any weather station in Nevada.

Climate data for Laughlin, Nevada, 1991–2020 Normals, extremes 1988–present
Month	Jan	Feb	Mar	Apr	May	Jun	Jul	Aug	Sep	Oct	Nov	Dec	Year
Record high °F (°C)	80 (27)	90 (32)	106 (41)	106 (41)	115 (46)	125 (52)	124 (51)	121 (49)	119 (48)	109 (43)	94 (34)	80 (27)	125 (52)
Mean maximum °F (°C)	74.2 (23.4)	79.7 (26.5)	90.2 (32.3)	100.1 (37.8)	107.8 (42.1)	115.5 (46.4)	118.6 (48.1)	116.3 (46.8)	111.3 (44.1)	102.1 (38.9)	85.7 (29.8)	73.3 (22.9)	119.5 (48.6)
Mean daily maximum °F (°C)	64.5 (18.1)	69.2 (20.7)	77.4 (25.2)	85.7 (29.8)	95.4 (35.2)	105.5 (40.8)	109.8 (43.2)	108.4 (42.4)	101.9 (38.8)	88.7 (31.5)	74.1 (23.4)	63.5 (17.5)	87.0 (30.6)
Daily mean °F (°C)	54.5 (12.5)	57.9 (14.4)	64.3 (17.9)	71.5 (21.9)	80.8 (27.1)	90.1 (32.3)	95.8 (35.4)	94.9 (34.9)	87.9 (31.1)	75.0 (23.9)	62.3 (16.8)	53.7 (12.1)	74.1 (23.4)
Mean daily minimum °F (°C)	44.6 (7.0)	46.6 (8.1)	51.2 (10.7)	57.4 (14.1)	66.3 (19.1)	74.7 (23.7)	81.9 (27.7)	81.3 (27.4)	73.8 (23.2)	61.3 (16.3)	50.6 (10.3)	43.8 (6.6)	61.1 (16.2)
Mean minimum °F (°C)	33.1 (0.6)	35.9 (2.2)	39.9 (4.4)	46.9 (8.3)	54.4 (12.4)	63.2 (17.3)	71.7 (22.1)	71.2 (21.8)	63.3 (17.4)	48.7 (9.3)	38.7 (3.7)	32.7 (0.4)	30.4 (−0.9)
Record low °F (°C)	23 (−5)	24 (−4)	34 (1)	37 (3)	44 (7)	54 (12)	58 (14)	60 (16)	55 (13)	35 (2)	25 (−4)	22 (−6)	22 (−6)
Average precipitation inches (mm)	1.02 (26)	1.16 (29)	0.75 (19)	0.17 (4.3)	0.04 (1.0)	0.04 (1.0)	0.18 (4.6)	0.43 (11)	0.32 (8.1)	0.34 (8.6)	0.32 (8.1)	0.58 (15)	5.35 (135.7)
Average precipitation days (≥ 0.01 in)	3.3	3.6	3.0	1.4	0.3	0.3	1.4	1.7	1.3	1.4	1.2	1.9	20.8
Source 1: NOAA
Source 2: National Weather Service

== Demographics ==
Historical population
Census	Pop.	Note	%±
2020	8,658		—
U.S. Decennial Census

As of the census of 2000, there were 7,076 people, 3,177 households, and 1,995 families residing in the CDP. The population density was 80.3 inhabitants per square mile (31.0/km^{2}). There were 4,127 housing units at an average density of 46.8 per square mile (18.1/km^{2}). The racial makeup of the CDP was 89.06% White, 2.81% African American, 0.62% Native American, 2.29% Asian, 0.18% Pacific Islander, 2.74% from other races, and 2.29% from two or more races. Hispanic or Latino of any race were 10.56% of the population.

There were 3,177 households, out of which 19.7% had children under the age of 18 living with them, 47.7% were married couples living together, 10.4% had a female householder with no husband present, and 37.2% were non-families. 26.0% of all households were made up of individuals, and 8.7% had someone living alone who was 65 years of age or older. The average household size was 2.22 and the average family size was 2.61.

The population was spread out, with 18.3% under the age of 18, 6.1% from 18 to 24, 23.3% from 25 to 44, 33.6% from 45 to 64, and 18.6% who were 65 years of age or older. The median age was 46 years. For every 100 females, there were 97.7 males. For every 100 females age 18 and over, there were 95.0 males.

The median income for a household in the CDP was $36,885, and the median income for a family was $40,104. Males had a median income of $27,854 versus $20,973 for females. The per capita income for the CDP was $21,097. About 7.5% of families and 9.6% of the population were below the poverty line, including 14.7% of those under age 18 and 1.9% of those age 65 or over.

== Tourism ==
Laughlin is the third most visited casino and resort destination in the state after Las Vegas and Reno and is one of the top five destinations for American RV enthusiasts. The casino corridor offers over two dozen food and beverage establishments.

A September 2013, article in the Las Vegas Review-Journal:

Once a boomtown, Laughlin has seen nothing but declines for a dozen years, almost exactly coinciding with the loss of regular airline flights after Sept. 11, 2001. The 2.1 million visitors recorded last year by the Las Vegas Convention and Visitors Authority is less than half the 1997 peak. Through July, the count has dropped another 2.2 percent compared to 2012.

In 2019, Laughlin recorded 1.8 million visitors.

== Government and politics ==
=== Government ===
Laughlin is an unincorporated town which has the same boundaries as the Township of Laughlin. The town is the subdivision by which it is governed by the Clark County Commission, which receives advice from the elected Laughlin Town Advisory Board (LTAB). Members of the LTAB are elected for terms of two years. Prior to November 2016, the members of the LTAB were appointed.

There is a Laughlin Town Manager who is appointed by and reports to the Clark County Department of Administrative Services which, in turn, reports to the County Manager. The current position (February 2021) of Town Manager is vacant and is not expected to be refilled until sometime later in 2021; the current (February 2021) Town Board Secretary is Tammy Harris, who also reports to Administrative Services. Laughlin falls under the jurisdiction of the Las Vegas Metropolitan Police Department (LVMPD), and fire protection is provided by the Clark County Fire Department. The current (May 2021) commander of the Laughlin police Sub-Station is Lt. Grant Rogers. Laughlin has one of the lowest crime rates in the country, with a crime rate index of 2 (100 being the national average).

The Township of Laughlin, which is a judicial district for the purposes of elections, consists of a Justice Court, presided over by a Justice of the Peace (elected for a six-year term as a non-partisan official) and a Constable (elected for a four-year term also as a non-partisan official). Currently (November 2026) the Justice of the Peace is the Honorable Gino Boero and the Constable is Jordan Ross. Prior to 2020, the office of constable was partisan but this was changed to non-partisan by SB 462 (80th Session).

== Annual events ==
Beginning in 2001, the Tropicana Express Hotel and Casino has hosted the Talent Quest National Finals. The contest is held in the third week of September, where qualifying singers compete for the top spot in Male and Female Pop/Rock/R&B and Country/Western.

The Laughlin River Run, held from 1983 to 2019, attracted thousands of avid motorcyclists each spring, usually in late April.

For New Year's celebrations, the neighboring town of Bullhead City, Arizona (in the Mountain Standard Time Zone), is one hour ahead of Laughlin (in the Pacific Standard Time Zone); tourists can celebrate New Years midnight in Bullhead City and then cross the bridge into Laughlin to celebrate it again during their midnight.

== Parks and recreation ==
Located in the North Reach of Laughlin is the Colorado River Greenway Heritage Trail park. It include nine miles (14 km) of trails for bicyclists, pedestrians, and equestrians; restrooms; picnic sites; shade shelters; fishing piers; an extensive playground with water sprays in the summer; and a pedestrian bridge over State Highway 163 which provides access to the Colorado River.

In the center of Upper Laughlin, next to the Spirit Mountain Activity Center, and one block from the town library, is Mountain View Park. It includes two softball fields, a playground, exercise trail, tennis courts, basketball courts, volleyball court, shaded picnic tables, a dog run, and a skateboard park.

At the south end of Upper Laughlin is the town pool. It is open during the summer months, and it includes full locker room facilities, shaded tables, and a large water park-style slide.

At the southernmost reaches of the township is Big Bend of the Colorado State Recreation Area. This 2,100-acre (850 ha) public recreation area on the west bank of the Colorado River offers boating, fishing, camping, picnicking, and hiking on four miles (6.4 km) of developed trails.

== Education ==
The Clark County School District serves Laughlin. Children are transported by bus to local schools all located within the town limits. They are William G. Bennett Elementary School (K-5), Laughlin Junior High School (6-8) and Laughlin High School (9-12). The Junior High School and the High School share the same campus.

== Infrastructure ==
=== Community Resources Center ===
The Community Resources Center is in the Clark County Regional Government Center complex in Laughlin. Several social services agencies provide assistance to the public from this building. The River Fund, Inc., is a local non-profit agency providing direct emergency and crisis services for individuals and families. East Valley Family Services is a non-profit organization supporting Laughlin through a variety of programs for families, children, and seniors, as well as providing advice regarding other public assistance programs. The State of Nevada Division of Welfare and Supportive Services offers timely and temporary services for families, the disabled, and the elderly. The local office of the Southern Nevada Health District and the constable's office are also in this building.

=== Water supply ===
The Big Bend Water District provides the water supply for Laughlin.

=== Water reclamation ===
The Clark County Water Reclamation District provides water treatment and recycling for Laughlin.

=== Flood control ===
The Clark County Regional Flood Control District plans and engineers flood control management for Laughlin.

=== Library ===
Laughlin has a public library, a branch of the Las Vegas–Clark County Library District. The Laughlin Library has full access to the district's extensive collection of books, periodicals, and videos. It includes computers with printers, and internet access for public use, wireless internet access, a fully stocked and staffed children's library, study rooms, a community room, a small conference room, and a small but excellent art gallery. It is the largest rural library in Clark County with 15,562 square feet (1,446 m^{2}) and over 70,000 volumes.

=== Transportation ===
There are no freeways that pass directly through Laughlin, though Nevada State Route 163 connects Laughlin with southern Nevada and with Arizona State Route 95 in Bullhead City via a bridge over the Colorado River.

A second bridge connecting Laughlin to Bullhead City opened on June 7, 2024 after three years of construction at a cost of $60.6 million. The Silver Copper Crossing carries one lane of traffic in each direction.

Silver Rider Transit provides bus service on two routes in Laughlin, one of which operates 24 hours a day, 365 days a year. It also operates express buses to Las Vegas. Laughlin/Bullhead International Airport (IFP) lies across the river in Bullhead City, Arizona. The airport provides casino-sponsored chartered flights, and is also utilized by some private aircraft. Private shuttle companies connect Laughlin with Harry Reid International Airport in Las Vegas. The Riverside casino also operates a ferry to Bullhead City which connects to Bullhead Area Transit System. A shuttle also connects Laughlin with the Amtrak station in Kingman, Arizona. Laughlin is served by the bus company TUFESA with service to Phoenix and Las Vegas.

== See also ==
- Laughlin (Nevada gaming area)
