= Fred Benninger =

German American businessperson (b. 1917, d. 2004)

Fred Benninger (1917–2004) was a German American businessperson who was a close advisor to billionaire Kirk Kerkorian. He served as a top executive at several companies controlled by Kerkorian, including Metro-Goldwyn-Mayer, Western Airlines, and MGM Grand, Inc.

== Biography ==
Benninger was born on March 20, 1917, in Günzburg, Germany. He moved with his family to New York City in 1928. He attended New York University and then the University of Southern California, where he graduated with a degree in accounting in 1941. During World War II, he served as a pilot in the Army Air Corps. He worked as an accountant at Arthur Andersen for some time.

In 1946, Benninger was hired by Flying Tiger Airlines as the company's comptroller. He went on to become general manager and then executive vice-president of the airline. While working there, he met Kirk Kerkorian, the chairman of another airline, Trans International Airlines.

Benninger left the Flying Tigers in 1967 to work for Kerkorian, beginning a close association that would last the rest of his life. He was responsible for overseeing the development of the International Hotel, and also was appointed as a director of Trans International. He soon became the president of International Leisure, a publicly traded company organized by Kerkorian to hold the International and Flamingo hotels.

In 1971, Benninger left International Leisure, which was in the process of being sold to Hilton Hotels, and was appointed chairman of two companies in which Kerkorian had acquired major stakes, Western Air Lines and Metro-Goldwyn-Mayer. His tenure at Western lasted until 1976, when Kerkorian sold his shares. Meanwhile, at MGM, Benninger oversaw the company's entry into the casino industry, with the opening of the MGM Grand Hotel and Casino in Las Vegas in 1973 and MGM Grand Reno in 1978. When MGM was split in 1980 into two companies, a movie studio and a casino hotel company, he remained with the latter, MGM Grand Hotels, Inc., as its chairman and chief executive officer. He retired from his posts in 1982.

In 1986, Kerkorian sold MGM Grand Hotels to Bally Manufacturing and formed a new company with the rights to the MGM Grand name. Benninger became the chairman and CEO of the new company, MGM Grand, Inc. As CEO, he oversaw the launch of the airline MGM Grand Air and planning for the new MGM Grand Las Vegas (after the first MGM Grand had been renamed as Bally's Las Vegas). Benninger stepped down as CEO in 1990, but continued as chairman until 1995, and as a director for the remainder of his life.

Benninger died on February 29, 2004, at the age of 86, at his home in Las Vegas. Months after his death, he was inducted into the Gaming Hall of Fame.
