= William R. Eadington =

American economist

William Richard Eadington
- Born: January 1, 1946; Fullerton, California, U.S.
- Died: February 11, 2013; Crystal Bay, Nevada, U.S.
- Education: Santa Clara University; Claremont Graduate School
- Occupation: Academic
- Spouse: Margaret Dean
- Children: 1 son, 1 daughter

William R. Eadington (1946–2013) was an American economist and the founder of Gambling Studies. He served as the Philip J. Satre chair in Gaming Studies in the Department of Economics and the director of the Institute for the Study of Gambling and Commercial Gaming at the University of Nevada, Reno.

== Early life ==
William R. Eadington was born on January 1, 1946, in Fullerton, California. He grew up in Brea, California.

Eadington graduated from Santa Clara University, where he received a bachelor's degree in mathematics. He earned an MA and a PhD in economics from the Claremont Graduate University.

== Career ==
Eadington was an economist. He joined the Department of Economics as a faculty member at the University of Nevada, Reno in 1969. He served as the director of its Institute for the Study of Gambling and Commercial Gaming. He was subsequently promoted to an endowed chair, serving as the Philip J. Satre chair in Gaming Studies. Meanwhile, he was a visiting professor at the Harvard Medical School as well as the University of Salford and the London School of Economics in England.

Eadington organized the inaugural National Conference on Gambling and Risk Taking in 1974. It later became known as the International Conference on Gambling and Risk Taking. He edited conference papers and published them as books. He was also the editor of the 1984 issue of the Annals of the American Academy of Political Science on gambling. Additionally, he published articles in academic journals like the Journal of Gambling Studies, International Gambling Studies, the Journal of Gambling Business and Economics, the UNLV Gaming Research & Review Journal, the Annals of Tourism Research, the Journal of Travel Research, and the Journal of Economic Perspectives.

Eadington served on the board of the National Council on Problem Gambling. He also advised the governments of South Africa and South Korea on the economic benefits of gambling.

Eadington received an honorary doctorate from the University of Macau in 2008. He was inducted into the Gaming Hall of Fame in 2011. He received the Goldman Lifetime Award for Advocacy from the National Council on Problem Gambling in 2012.

== Personal life and death ==
Eadington was married to Margaret Dean. They had a son, Michael Eadington, and a daughter, Diana Eadington-Reed.

Eadington died on February 11, 2013, in Crystal Bay, Nevada. He was 67 years old. Three days after his death, on February 14, 2013, Senator Dean Heller highlighted Eadington's "academic contributions and expertise in this field have been invaluable to the State of Nevada and to UNR" and called him "honorable Nevadan" before the Senate.

== Works ==
- Eadington, William R., ed. (1976). Gambling and Society: Interdisciplinary Studies on the Subject of Gambling. Springfield, Illinois: Thomas. ISBN 9780398034597. OCLC 1324494.
- Eadington, William R., ed. (1990). Indian Gaming and the Law. Reno, Nevada: Institute for the Study of Gambling and Commercial Gaming. ISBN 9780942828306. OCLC 22236908.
- Cornelius, Judy A.; Eadington, William R., eds. (1991). Gambling and Public Policy: International Perspectives. Reno, Nevada: Institute for the Study of Gambling and Commercial Gaming. ISBN 9780942828313. OCLC 24762163.
- Cornelius, Judy A.; Eadington, William R., eds. (1992). Gambling and Commercial Gaming: Essays in Business, Economics, Philosophy and Science. Reno, Nevada: Institute for the Study of Gambling and Commercial Gaming. ISBN 9780942828320. OCLC 26207962.
- Eadington, William R.; Smith, Valene L., eds. (1992). Tourism Alternatives: Potentials and Problems in the Development of Tourism. Philandelphia, Pennsylvania: University of Pennsylvania Press. ISBN 9780812231489. OCLC 25629190.
- Cornelius, Judy A.; Eadington, William R., eds. (1993). Gambling Behavior and Problem Gambling. Reno, Nevada: Institute for the Study of Gambling and Commercial Gaming. ISBN 9780942828337. OCLC 28829082.
- Cornelius, Judy A.; Eadington, William R., eds. (1997). Gambling: Public Policies and the Social Sciences. Reno, Nevada: Institute for the Study of Gambling and Commercial Gaming. ISBN 9780942828375. OCLC 37537652.
- Cornelius, Judy A.; Eadington, William R., eds. (1999). The Business of Gaming: Economic and Management Issues. Reno, Nevada: Institute for the Study of Gambling and Commercial Gaming. ISBN 9780942828382. OCLC 41535776.
- Cornelius, Judy A.; Eadington, William R.; Vancura, Olaf, eds. (2000). Finding the Edge: Mathematical Analysis of Casino Games. Reno, Nevada: Institute for the Study of Gambling and Commercial Gaming. ISBN 9780942828405. OCLC 44157285.
- Cornelius, Judy A.; Eadington, William R.; Marotta, Jeffrey J., eds. (2002). The Downside: Problem and Pathological Gambling. Reno, Nevada: Institute for the Study of Gambling and Commercial Gaming. ISBN 9780942828399. OCLC 50470964.
- Eadington, William R.; Ethier, Stewart N., eds. (2007). Optimal Play: Mathematical Studies of Games and Gambling. Reno, Nevada: Institute for the Study of Gambling and Commercial Gaming. ISBN 9780979687303. OCLC 206497190.
- Doyle, Meighan R.; Eadington, William R., eds. (2009). Integrated Resort Casinos: Implications for Economic Growth and Social Impacts. Reno, Nevada: Institute for the Study of Gambling and Commercial Gaming. ISBN 9780979687310. OCLC 449659156.
