= Reno (Nevada gaming area) =

Nevada Gaming Control Board reporting area

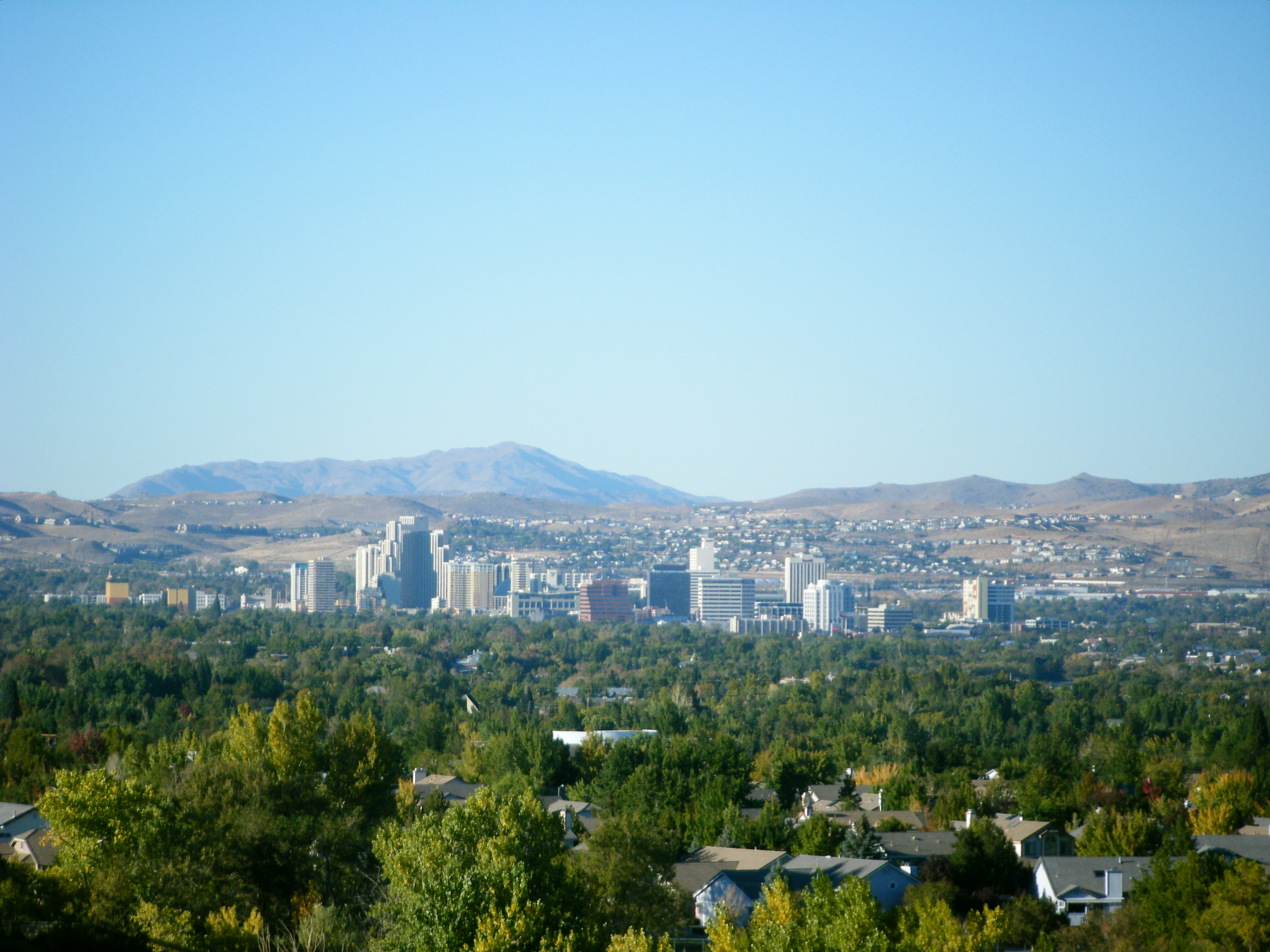
Skyline of Reno, Nevada. Looking North towards downtown from Audrey Harris Park on Lakeside Drive.

Reno is only 14 miles over the California border. The Nevada Gaming Commission groups it as one gaming region, with a total of five casinos earning more than $72 million in the last fiscal year. In other reports the Reno region is consolidated with the Sparks region which is only four miles farther east on Interstate 80.

== Indian casino competition ==
Unlike Las Vegas, the Reno/Sparks region built only one major new casino since the 1990s, the Silver Legacy Reno. The older casinos, particularly the Atlantis and the Peppermill, have been updated and new hotel towers have been added. Reno is competing with the United Auburn Indian Community which has built the large Thunder Valley Casino Resort in Lincoln, California. This casino is off Interstate 80 on the drive from San Francisco and Sacramento, California. In addition to being 80 miles closer, it is also at low altitude, so that it is not necessary to cross the Sierra Nevada mountain range which frequently becomes hazardous in winter. Further competition arrived on December 18, 2008 with the opening of the Red Hawk Casino run by the Shingle Springs Band of Miwok Indians. The Red Hawk Casino is also very close to Sacramento.

Ray Hagar from the Reno Gazette-Journal said, "The competition from tribal casinos was once a thorn in Reno's side. Now, it is poised to be the dagger in the heart of Reno-Sparks and Lake Tahoe properties that can't afford to join in the Cold War-style escalation of the Atlantis and Peppermill expansions."

== Largest casinos ==
Top 7 Casinos with unlimited licenses for FY09 in Reno/Sparks
Name	Rooms	Location	Gaming Revenue in FY08
Atlantis Casino Resort	1000	Airport/Convention Center	>$72 million
Peppermill Reno	1635	Airport/Convention Center	>$72 million
Harrah's Reno	974	Reno downtown	>$72 million
Silver Legacy Reno	1712	Reno downtown	>$72 million
Eldorado Reno	817	Reno downtown	>$72 million
Grand Sierra Resort	1995	Reno downtown south of river	>$36 million <$72 million
Nugget Casino Resort	1600	Sparks	>$36 million <$72 million

According to the abstract, there are thirteen thousand rooms in the Reno casinos. For FY08 gaming revenue was $872m and non-gaming revenue was $733m. Casinos with revenue over $36 million had 77% of the gaming revenue, and 82% of the non-gaming revenue.

There are ten casinos in Washoe County, many of which are nearby Reno, but are not classified as being in Reno/Sparks region by the Nevada Gaming Commission. Boomtown Reno and Gold Ranch Reno to the west of the city and Tamarack Junction to the south are examples of casinos in this group.

== Revenue History ==
Gaming Revenue in the Reno area peaked in June 2006 as competition from Sacramento Indian casinos intensified. Revenue began to rapidly decrease from that point as the recession took over.

All figures are in thousands of dollars and show the change over a 4-year period.

Trailing 12 month gaming revenue for Reno/Sparks
Device	Reno 30-Jun-10	Reno 30-Jun-06	Sparks 30-Jun-10	Sparks 30-Jun-06
Twenty One	$55,231	$82,012	$4,863	$9,458
Rest of Pit	$78,065	$105,529	$10,023	$13,465
Card	$7,775	$9,112	$1,227	$1,119
Slots	$430,636	$578,209	$112,056	$146,608
Total	$571,707	$774,862	$128,169	$170,650
