= American Gaming Association =

American gambling industry association

The American Gaming Association (AGA) is a United States gambling industry association. It was founded in 1994 with the goal of promoting, educating and lobbying on behalf of the gambling industry. The AGA's offices are located in Washington, D.C.

The AGA addresses federal, legislative, and regulatory issues affecting its members, their employees and customers, such as federal taxation, regulation, and travel and tourism matters. It also attempts to serve as the gambling industry's information clearinghouse, providing the public timely and accurate data. AGA members include major casino operators, financial and professional service companies, suppliers of gambling products, as well as representatives of state or regional gambling associations.

Each year the AGA sponsors a major gambling trade show, the Global Gaming Expo.

Frank Fahrenkopf, a former chairman of the Republican Party, was the AGA's president from its inception until his retirement in mid-2013. Geoff Freeman, head of the U.S. Travel Association, was selected by the AGA board in April 2013 to replace Fahrenkopf. Freeman left the AGA in late July 2018 to become the president and CEO of the Grocery Manufacturers Association. In December 2018, the AGA named Bill Miller, a senior vice-president of the Business Roundtable lobby group, as Freeman’s permanent replacement, effective January 14, 2019.

The AGA has coordinated action on advertising, creating the Responsible Marketing Code on Sports Wagering in 2019.

== See also ==
- International Center for Responsible Gaming
