= Don Laughlin =

American gambling entrepreneur (1931–2023)

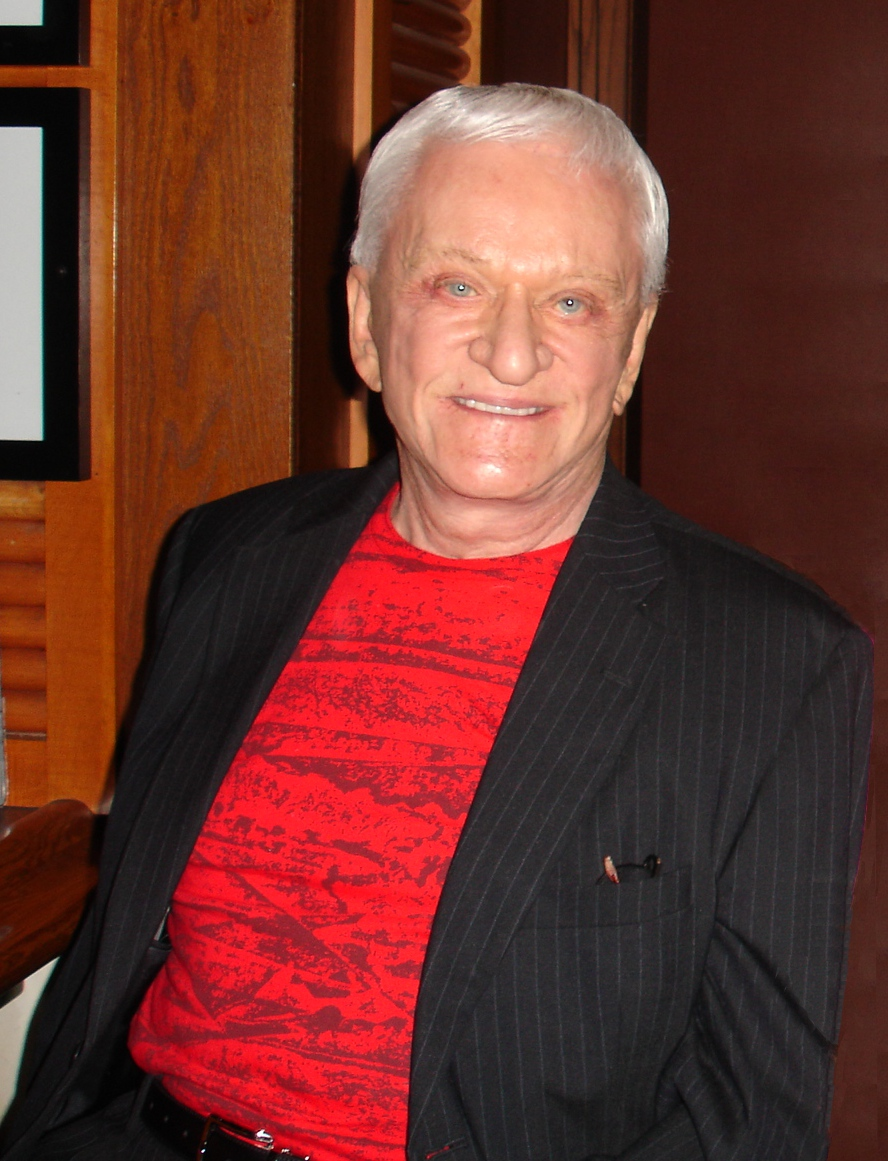
- Laughlin in 2009
- Born: Donald Joseph Laughlin; May 4, 1931; Owatonna, Minnesota, U.S.
- Died: October 22, 2023 (aged 92); Laughlin, Nevada, U.S.
- Occupation: Businessman
- Spouse: Betty Jones (m. 1953; died 2022)
- Children: 3

Donald Joseph Laughlin (May 4, 1931 – October 22, 2023) was an American gambling entrepreneur, hotelier, and rancher for whom the town of Laughlin, Nevada, is named.

== Early life ==
A native of Owatonna, Minnesota, Laughlin worked winters during his youth as a fur trapper. He took the profits and used them to purchase slot machines for installation in hunting lodges. He was making $500 a week when his school principal gave him an ultimatum: get out of slots or get out of school. He chose to drop out of school.

== Career ==
Laughlin moved to Las Vegas, Nevada, in the late 1950s and purchased his first casino, the "101 Club." By 1964, Laughlin had sold the 101 Club, which later became The Opera House. That same year, Laughlin was flying his private plane over the California/Arizona/Nevada tri-state area near the Colorado River. Growth in the area, specifically in Bullhead City and Kingman in Arizona, and Needles in California, was spurred by the construction of nearby Davis Dam, completed in 1951. The area was also a major stop along Route 66. It was during that flight that Laughlin envisioned the potential of the area as a resort destination. Soon after, he purchased a shuttered, eight-room riverfront motel on 6.5 acres (2.6 ha) for US$250,000. Though the landowner had several offers, he decided to sell the property to Laughlin because of his previous casino background.

In less than two years the Riverside Resort was entertaining guests not only with gambling but with all-you-can-eat chicken dinners for 98 cents. Play at the casino was on twelve slot machines and two live gaming tables. Accommodations at the Riverside were available in only four of the motel's eight rooms; Laughlin's family occupied the remaining four.

The Town of Laughlin is believed to have received its name when a U.S. Postal Service inspector asked Laughlin to give a name to the area post office in order to receive mail. Laughlin suggested the name "Riverside and Casino," but the postal inspector in turn suggested "Laughlin" because of their common Irish heritage.

In 1972, the property, now known as the Riverside Resort Hotel & Casino, underwent a major expansion with the addition of 48 new rooms. In 1975, 52 more rooms were added. Construction of a 14-story hotel/casino tower in 1983 added 253 rooms and in 1986, a second 14-floor tower added 307 more rooms and an automotive museum. With free admission to the public, the Riverside's extensive collection is an offshoot of the famous Harrah's collection. One longtime exhibit, a 1969 Chevrolet Camaro nicknamed "Big Red" and specially prepared for road racing, has been returned to service and was the cover story of the May 2005 edition of Hot Rod Magazine. The largest expansion came in 1994 with the addition of 800 more rooms for a current total of 1405 rooms. A bowling center, one of only two in Laughlin, was constructed in 1999. Mr. Laughlin also helped finance the construction of a bridge over the Colorado River between the northern tip of Laughlin and the Laughlin-Bullhead International Airport (on the Arizona side), connecting Nevada Highway 163 with Arizona Highways 95 & 68. He also helped to finance the expansion of the airport to enable it to accept full-sized commercial airliners.

Laughlin spent his time shuttling in his private helicopter between his penthouse suite atop the Riverside and his cattle ranch in nearby Kingman. He also used his helicopter in travels back to his hometown of Owatonna, Minnesota, for the Steele County Free Fair, parking it in a vacant lot behind the Owatonna Country Inn & Suites before it was replaced by a cinema's parking lot.

== Personal life and death ==
Laughlin married Betty L. Jones in 1953. They had three children - Dan, Ron, and Erin - and were married until her death in 2022.

Laughlin died in the town named after himself on October 22, 2023, at the age of 92. He was cryopreserved by the Alcor Life Extension Foundation.
