= Riverside Resort Hotel & Casino =

Casino hotel in Nevada, United States

Don Laughlin's Riverside Resort Hotel & Casino
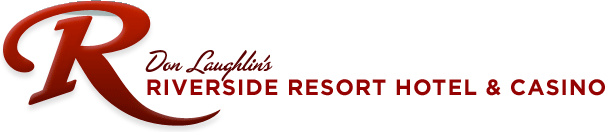

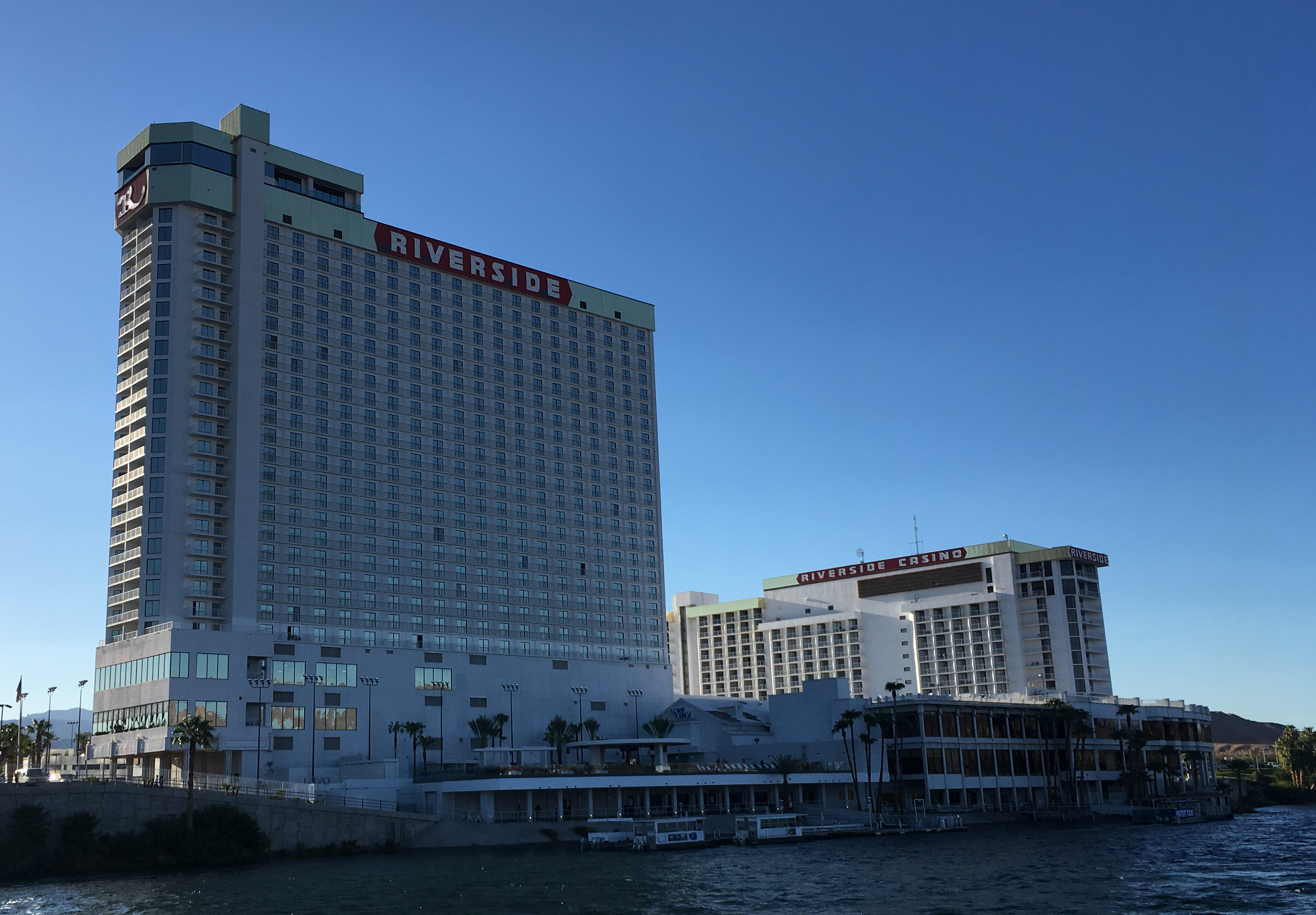
- The property as seen from the Colorado River in 2018
- Interactive map of Don Laughlin's Riverside Resort Hotel & Casino
- Location: Laughlin, Nevada, U.S.; 1650 South Casino Drive; 35.168°N 114.572°W
- Opened: August 2, 1966; 60 years ago
- No. of rooms: 1,405
- Gaming space: 89,106 sq ft (8,278.2 m^{2})
- Owner: Don Laughlin family
- Renovated in: 1972, 1975, 1983, 1986, 1994, 1999
- Website: Official website

Don Laughlin's Riverside Resort Hotel & Casino is a hotel and casino on the banks of the Colorado River in Laughlin, Nevada.

== History ==
Don Laughlin bought the southern tip of Nevada in 1954 (informally called South Pointe). Laughlin operated the 101 Club in Las Vegas. He opened the Riverside Resort on August 2, 1966. It offered all-you-can-eat chicken dinners for 98 cents, (Note: equivalent to $9.72 in 2025 adjusted for inflation) twelve slot machines and two live gambling tables, and eight motel rooms, four of which were occupied by Don Laughlin's family. Laughlin wanted to call the community "Riverside" or "Casino" but the Post Office opted for Laughlin.

In 1972, Don Laughlin expanded by building a west wing that added 48 rooms, and in 1975, a 52-room east wing was built. Construction of a 14-story hotel/casino tower in 1983 added 253 rooms and in 1986, a second fourteen-floor tower added 307 more rooms and an automotive museum. With free admission to the public, the Riverside's extensive collection is an offshoot of the famous Harrah's collection. The largest expansion came in 1994 with the addition of 792 more rooms in a 30-story hotel tower, which remains the tallest of the hotel towers in Laughlin. The expansion cost more than $70 million. (Note: equivalent to $152 million in 2025 adjusted for inflation) A 34-lane bowling center, only one of two in Laughlin since the addition of a bowling center at the Laughlin River Lodge, was constructed in 1999.

== Facilities ==
The resort has 1,405 rooms, and a six-screen movie theater.

The Riverside poker room is smoke-free and has a large rear window with a vista of the Colorado river and nearby mountains.

The resort has a full-service RV park with 740 spaces, as well as several restaurants. The hotel has a yacht, The U.S.S. Riverside, which is available for charter.

== Don Laughlin's Classic Car Museum ==
Don Laughlin's Classic Car Museum is a free exhibition of antique, classic, and special-interest automobiles, housed in two separate areas at the resort. There are also some trucks and motorcycles. The first hall, located next to the main valet entrance, displays a rotating selection that includes horseless carriages, cars used in motion pictures, and a motorcycle owned by actor Steve McQueen. The main Classic Auto Exhibition Hall is located on the third floor of the south tower, and also features privately owned vehicles that are for sale on consignment.

== Popular culture ==
Candid Camera filmed a segment at the Riverside, featuring guests' reactions to slot machines in the hotel rooms.

The fictional Frost Casino where Rian Johnson's Poker Face story begins uses Riverside as stand in.
