= Fort Mojave Indian Reservation =

Federally recognized tribe and reservation in Arizona

Fort Mojave Indian Reservation Pipa Aha Macav (Mohave)
- Indian reservation
- Seal

- Location of Fort Mojave Indian Reservation
- Tribe: Fort Mojave
- Country: United States
- States: Arizona; California; Nevada
- Counties: Clark; Mohave; San Bernardino
- Established: 1870
- Headquarters: Needles

Government
  - Body: Fort Mojave Tribal Council
  - Chairman: Tim Williams
  - Vice-Chairman: Shan Lewis

Area
  - Total: 65.44 sq mi (169.5 km^{2})

Population (2017)
  - Total: 1,707
  - Density: 26.08/sq mi (10.07/km^{2})
- Website: fortmojaveindiantribe.com

The Fort Mojave Indian Reservation is an Indian reservation along the Colorado River, currently encompassing 23,699 acres (95.91 km^{2}) in Arizona, 12,633 acres (51.12 km^{2}) in California, and 5,582 acres (22.59 km^{2}) in the southernmost point of Nevada. Located at the tri-point of the three states, the reservation is home to approximately 1,100 citizens of the federally recognized Fort Mojave Indian Tribe of Arizona, California, and Nevada, a federally recognized tribe of Mojave people. Their autonym in the Mojave language is Pipa Aha Macav, which means "the People by the River".

Native Americans occupy less than 50 percent of the Mojave reservation. The Mojave people have leased much of their land to cotton, maize, and soybean farming companies, which employ a large population of resident Anglo-Americans and Mexican Americans.

The site of the former Fort Mohave and the eastern terminus of the Mojave Road are situated within the Fort Mojave Indian Reservation.

== Government ==
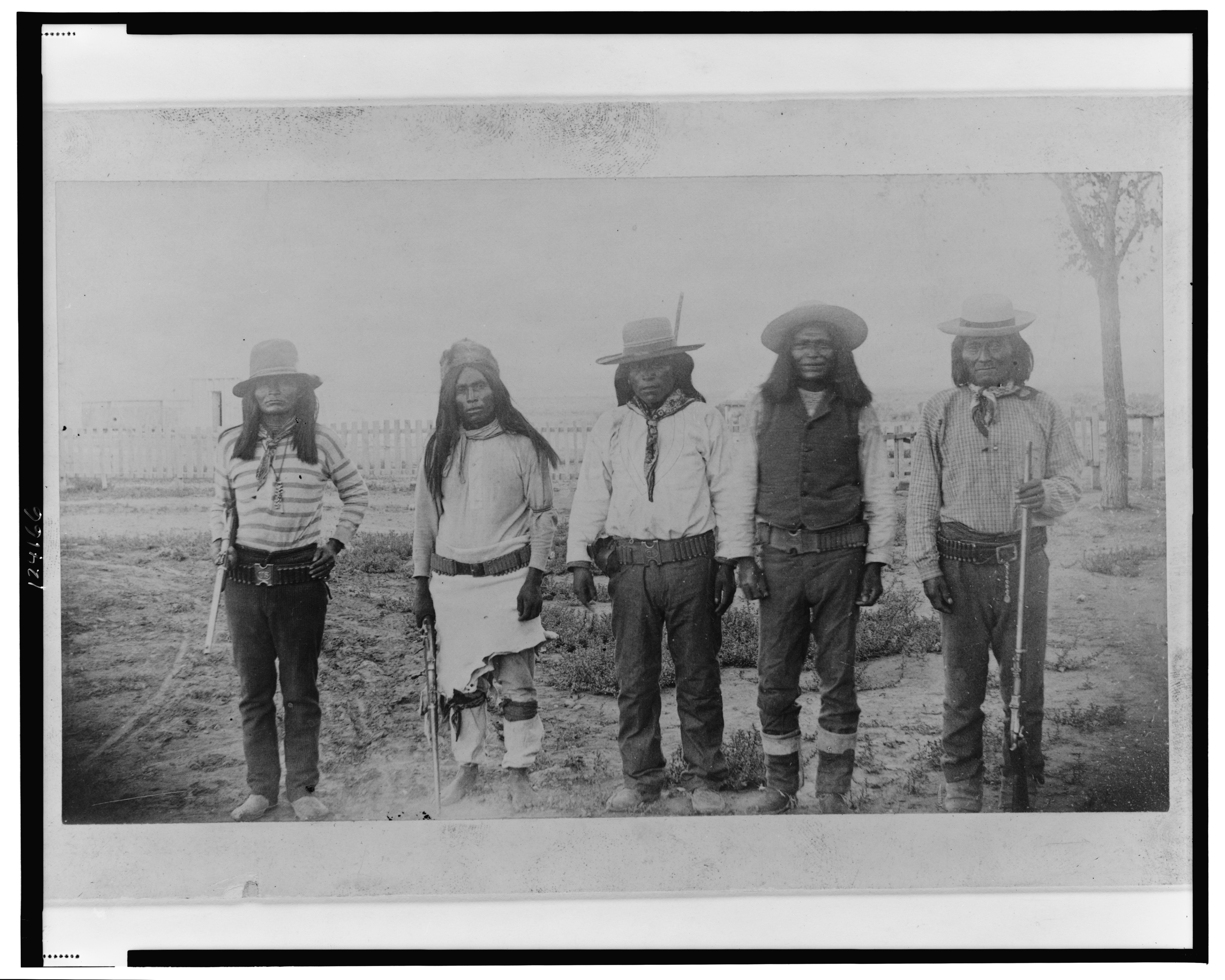
Fort Mojave chiefs, 1887, and their Quechan interpreter (second from the left)

The Fort Mojave Indian Tribe is governed by a democratically elected tribal council and is headquartered in Needles, California. Their administration in 2025 is:

- Chairman: Timothy Williams
- Vice Chairman: Shan Lewis
- Secretary: Colleen Garcia
- Council Member: Celina Reyes
- Council Member: Nichole Garcia
- Council Member: Johnny Hemers

== History ==
These lands were occupied for thousands of years by succeeding cultures of Indigenous peoples. The property covers areas along the Colorado River of the three adjacent states of Arizona, California, and Nevada. It is also sporadically traversed by the Mojave River in California.

The Fort Mojave Indian Reservation was established in 1890, and comprised the land of the former camp Mojave military reservation, thereby transferring it from the War Department to the Office of Indian Affairs. For decades until the early 1930s, it operated an Indian boarding school for Native American students from the Mojave and other tribes, as part of efforts to assimilate youth into the mainstream culture. They were forced to speak English and practice Christianity while at the school. The property was transferred to the reservation in 1935. It has allowed the buildings to deteriorate, as they were symbolic of a painful period in relations with the US.

== Economic development ==
The Mojave have leased considerable amounts of reservation land to agricultural companies for the cultivation of commodity crops: soybeans, corn, and alfalfa. Many white and Mexican American workers live here, with less than 50% of the reservation occupied by Mojave and other Native Americans.

The tribe owns and operates the Avi Resort & Casino in Nevada, founded in 1995. On October 20, 2003, the reservation government announced an agreement between the reservation and California Governor Gray Davis to allow the operation of a casino west of Needles, California (directly across the Colorado River from the Tribe's Arizona Reservation Lands).

The tribe also owns Avi Hotel, C-Plus Convenience Store, JB's Restaurant, and Mojave Resort Gold.

== Language revitalization ==
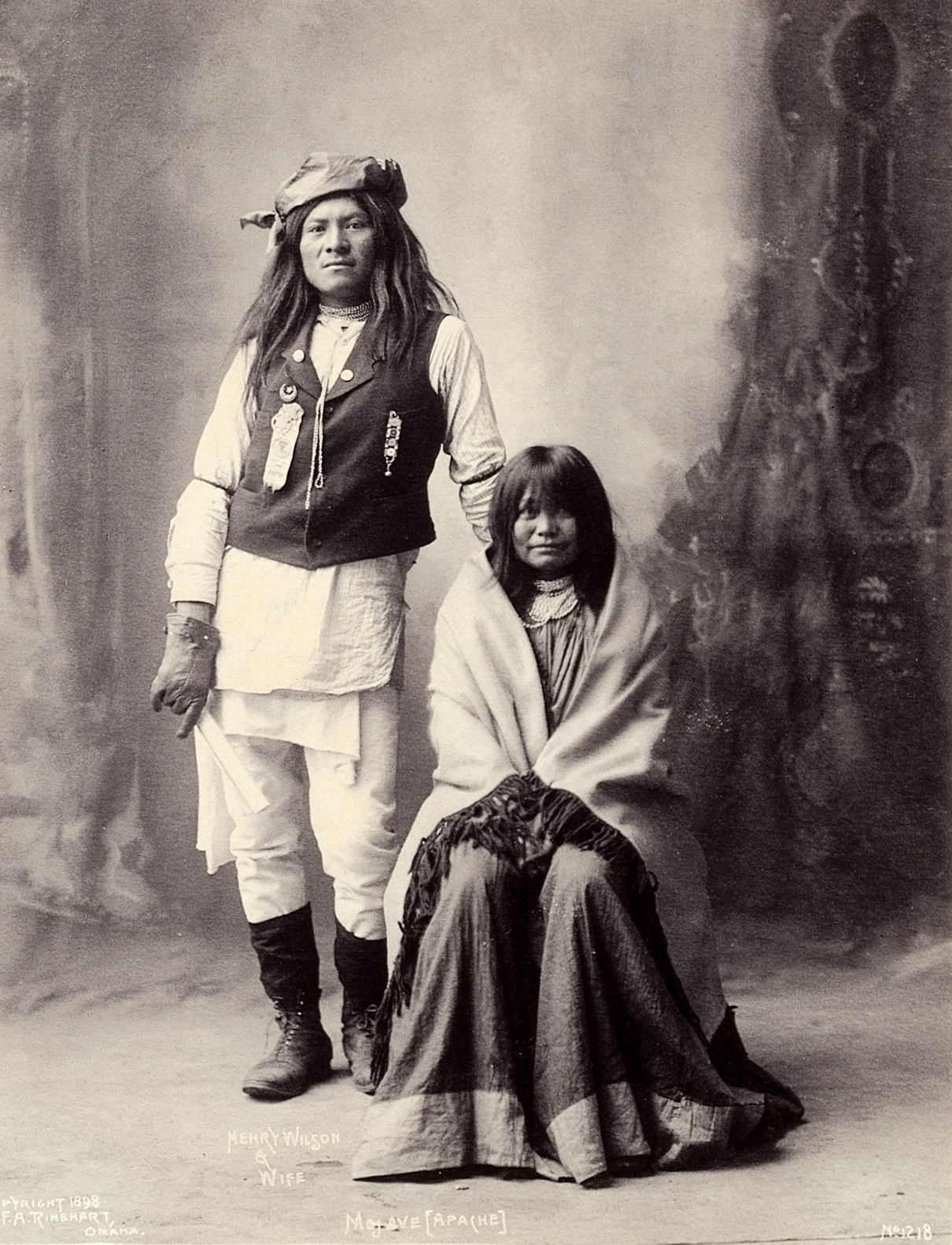
Henry Wilson and his wife, both Mojave

As of 2012, the Center for Indian Education at Arizona State University "has facilitated "workshops for both learners and speakers at the Fort Mojave Indian Reservation in northwest Arizona, California and Nevada. Fort Mojave has about 22 elders who speak some Mojave." The project is also bringing elders together with younger people to teach the traditional Mojave "bird songs."

The language preservation work of poet Natalie Diaz on the reservation was featured on the PBS NewsHour in March 2012.

== Location ==
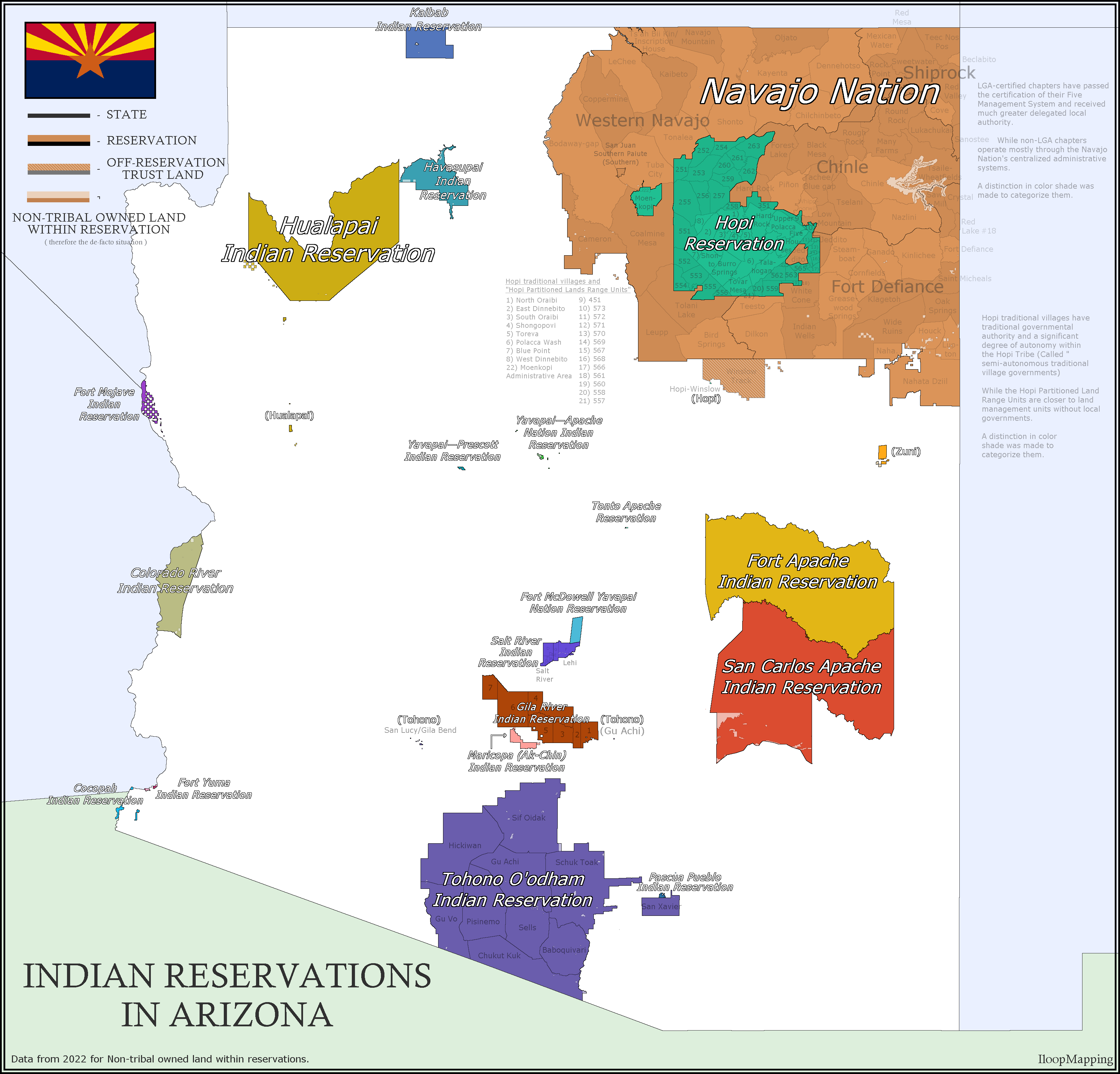
Map of Fort Mojave Indian Reservation and neighboring tribes

The Fort Mojave Indian Reservation is located at 34°56′34″N 114°36′33″W.

== Education ==
The portion of the reservation in California is served by the Needles Unified School District and the portion in Nevada by the Clark County School District. For elementary education in Arizona, one of the portions is served by the Bullhead City Elementary School District and the other by the Mohave Valley Elementary School District. Both portions in Arizona are served by the Colorado River Union High School District for secondary education.

== Communities ==
- Arizona Village, Arizona (part)
- Fort Mohave, Arizona (part)
- Golden Shores, Arizona (part)
- Mesquite Creek, Arizona
- Mohave Valley, Arizona (part, population 121)
- Mojave Ranch Estates, Arizona
- Needles, California (part, population 208; seat of tribal government)
- Willow Valley, Arizona (part)
