= Arizona Village, Arizona =

Census-designated place in Arizona, U.S.

- Census-designated place
- Location in Mohave County and the state of Arizona

- Location within Arizona Location within the United States
- Coordinates: 34°51′17″N 114°35′22″W
- Country: United States
- State: Arizona
- County: Mohave

Area
  - Total: 1.59 sq mi (4.12 km^{2})
  - Land: 1.59 sq mi (4.12 km^{2})
  - Water: 0 sq mi (0.00 km^{2})
- Elevation: 463 ft (141 m)

Population (2020)
  - Total: 1,057
  - Density: 664.7/sq mi (256.64/km^{2})
- Time zone: UTC-7 (MST)
- ZIP code: 86440
- Area code: 928
- FIPS code: 04-03915
- GNIS feature ID: 2407759

Arizona Village is a census-designated place (CDP) on the Fort Mojave Indian Reservation in Mohave County, Arizona, United States. The population was 1,057 at the 2020 census, up from 946 in 2010 and 351 in 2000.

== Geography ==
Arizona Village is located in western Mohave County. It is bordered to the southwest by the Colorado River, across which is the city of Needles, California. To the north the village is bordered by the Mohave Valley CDP. Arizona State Route 95 touches the northwest corner of Arizona Village, leading southwest across the Colorado into Needles and north 20 miles (32 km) to Bullhead City.

According to the United States Census Bureau, the Arizona Village CDP has a total area of 1.6 square miles (4.1 km^{2}), all land.

== Demographics ==
Historical population
Census	Pop.	Note	%±
2000	351		—
2010	946		169.5%
2020	1,057		11.7%
U.S. Decennial Census

Arizona Village first appeared on the 2000 U.S. Census as a census-designated place (CDP). Although the village is on the Fort Mojave Indian Reservation, a plurality of the residents (as of 2010) are non-Hispanic White.

=== 2020 census ===
As of the 2020 census, Arizona Village had a population of 1,057. The median age was 33.2 years. 30.7% of residents were under the age of 18 and 12.5% of residents were 65 years of age or older. For every 100 females there were 91.5 males, and for every 100 females age 18 and over there were 81.9 males age 18 and over.

86.6% of residents lived in urban areas, while 13.4% lived in rural areas.

There were 363 households in Arizona Village, of which 38.0% had children under the age of 18 living in them. Of all households, 34.4% were married-couple households, 18.7% were households with a male householder and no spouse or partner present, and 33.1% were households with a female householder and no spouse or partner present. About 23.7% of all households were made up of individuals and 11.8% had someone living alone who was 65 years of age or older.

There were 560 housing units, of which 35.2% were vacant. The homeowner vacancy rate was 4.0% and the rental vacancy rate was 0.5%.

Racial composition as of the 2020 census
Race	Number	Percent
White	385	36.4%
Black or African American	7	0.7%
American Indian and Alaska Native	505	47.8%
Asian	1	0.1%
Native Hawaiian and Other Pacific Islander	6	0.6%
Some other race	49	4.6%
Two or more races	104	9.8%
Hispanic or Latino (of any race)	197	18.6%

=== 2000 census ===
As of the census of 2000, there were 351 people, 83 households, and 77 families residing in the CDP. The population density was 337.1 inhabitants per square mile (130.2/km^{2}). There were 93 housing units at an average density of 89.3 per square mile (34.5/km^{2}). The racial makeup of the CDP was 89.5% Native American, 7.4% White, 0.3% Black or African American, 2.0% from other races, and 0.9% from two or more races. 24.2% of the population were Hispanic or Latino of any race.

There were 83 households, out of which 68.7% had children under the age of 18 living with them, 30.1% were married couples living together, 48.2% had a female householder with no husband present, and 7.2% were non-families. 7.2% of all households were made up of individuals, and none had someone living alone who was 65 years of age or older. The average household size was 4.23 and the average family size was 4.25.

In the CDP the population was spread out, with 48.7% under the age of 18, 12.8% from 18 to 24, 26.5% from 25 to 44, 10.3% from 45 to 64, and 1.7% who were 65 years of age or older. The median age was 19 years. For every 100 females there were 80.9 males. For every 100 females age 18 and over, there were 87.5 males.

The median income for a household in the CDP was $26,406, and the median income for a family was $23,571. Males had a median income of $26,875 versus $21,667 for females. The per capita income for the CDP was $9,591. About 23.0% of families and 22.4% of the population were below the poverty line, including 22.5% of those under age 18 and 50.0% of those age 65 or over.

== Education ==
The area is zoned to the Mohave Valley Elementary School District and the Colorado River Union High School District.

High school students attend River Valley High School in the Colorado River Union High School District.
