= Natalie Diaz =

American poet (born 1978)

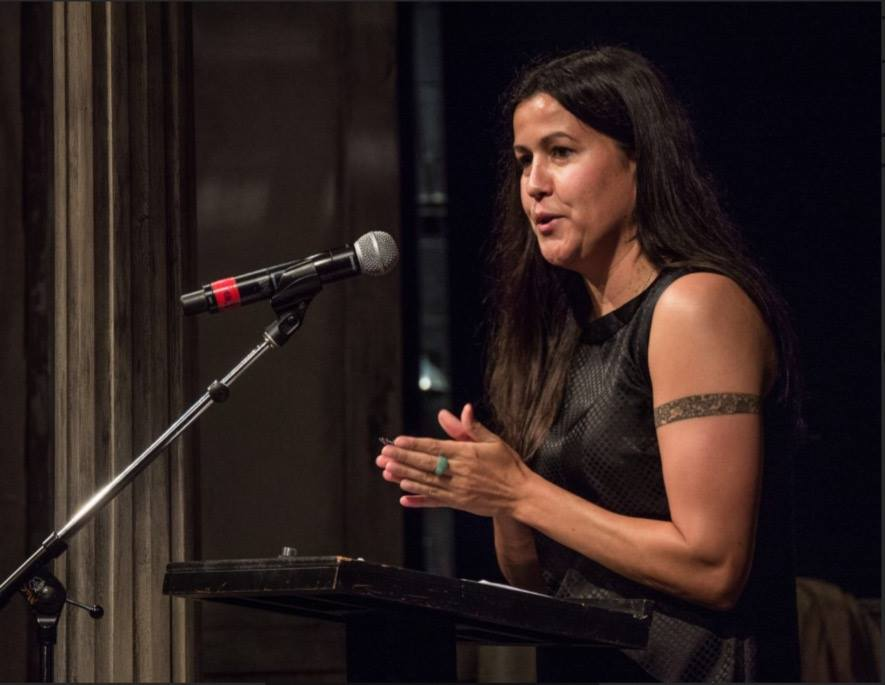
- Diaz in 2016
- Born: September 4, 1978 (age 48); Needles, California, U.S.
- Education: Old Dominion University (BA, MFA)
- Writing career
- Language: Mojave; English; Spanish
- Genre: Poetry
- Notable awards: Pulitzer Prize for Poetry 2021

Natalie Diaz (born September 4, 1978) is a Pulitzer Prize-winning Mojave American poet, language activist, former professional basketball player, and educator. She is enrolled in the Gila River Indian Community and identifies as Akimel O'odham. She is currently an associate professor at Arizona State University.

== Early life ==
Natalie Diaz was born in Needles, California, on September 4, 1978. She grew up in the Fort Mojave Indian Village in Needles, California, on the border of California, Arizona, and Nevada. She attended Old Dominion University, where she played point guard on the women's basketball team, reaching the NCAA Final Four as a freshman and the bracket of sixteen her other three years. She earned a bachelor's degree. After playing professional basketball in Europe and Asia, she returned to Old Dominion University, and completed an MFA in poetry and fiction, in 2006.

== Career ==
Her work appeared in Narrative, Poetry magazine, Drunken Boat, Prairie Schooner, Iowa Review, and Crab Orchard Review.

Diaz's debut book of poetry, When My Brother Was an Aztec, "portrays experiences rooted in Native American life with personal and mythic power." It was a 2012 Lannan Literary Selection, was shortlisted for the 2013 PEN/Open Book Award, and was a 2013 American Book Award winner. One important focus of the book is a sister struggling with her brother's addiction to crystal meth.

In 2012, she was interviewed about her poetry and language rehabilitation work on the PBS NewsHour.

In 2014, Diaz was the recipient of the Theodore H. Holmes ’51 and Bernice Holmes National Poetry Prize. The awarded poet is selected each year by the faculty of Princeton University’s Creative Writing Program. Joyce Carol-Oates was among the faculty that awarded Diaz.

A 2017 poem featured in the Academy of American Poets' Poem-A-Day, "From the desire field," invokes a line from Spanish poet Federico García Lorcas' poem, "Romance Sonámbulo."

In 2018, she was named as the Maxine and Jonathan Marshall Chair in Modern and Contemporary Poetry at Arizona State University.

In 2019, she was faculty at the CantoMundo Retreat.

In 2021, her book Postcolonial Love Poem won the Pulitzer Prize for Poetry. It was called "a collection of tender, heart-wrenching and defiant poems that explore what it means to love and be loved in an America beset by conflict." The book was also a finalist for the 2020 National Book Award, a finalist for the 2020 Los Angeles Times Book Prize, a finalist for the 2020 Forward Prize for Best Collection, and shortlisted for the 2020 T. S. Eliot Prize. Also in 2021, Diaz was elected as a chancellors for the Academy of American Poets, an organization founded in 1946 that aims to support American poets and encourage engagement with contemporary poetry. The Board of Chancellors oversee the Academy's work, are elected by current Board members, and serve six year terms.

Diaz's writing style has been described as "often consist[ing] of long lines tightly packed with precisely chosen images that mix metaphor with the fantastic."

== Personal life ==
Diaz currently lives in Mohave Valley, Arizona, where she used to work on language revitalization at Fort Mojave, her home reservation. She worked with the last Elder speakers of the Mojave language. She is enrolled as member of the Gila Indian Community.

== Bibliography ==
=== Poetry ===
- When My Brother Was an Aztec. Copper Canyon Press. October 10, 2013. ISBN 978-1-61932-033-8.
- Postcolonial Love Poem. Graywolf Press. March 3, 2020. ISBN 978-1-64445-014-7.

In anthology

- Kurt Schweigman and Lucille Lang Day, eds. (2016). Red Indian Road West: Native American Poetry from California. Scarlet Tanager Books. ISBN 978-0976867654
- Melissa Tuckey, ed. (2018). Ghost Fishing: An Eco-Justice Poetry Anthology. University of Georgia Press. ISBN 978-0820353159.

== Awards and honors ==
Year	Nominee / work	Award	Result
2007	No More Cake Here	Pablo Neruda Prize in Poetry	Won
2007	The Hooferman	Tobias Wolff Fiction Prize	Won
2012	Poetry Fellow	Lannan Literary Fellowship	Won
2012	Downhill Triolets	Narrative Prize	Won
2012	Poetry Scholar	Louis Untermeyer Scholarship in Poetry	Won
2015	Writing Fellow	PEN/Civitella Ranieri Foundation Fellowship	Won
2018	Poetry Fellow	MacArthur Fellowship	Won
2021	Postcolonial Love Poem	Pulitzer Prize for Poetry	Won
