= Earthly Gods =

2024 debut poetry collection by Jessica Nirvana Ram

- Author: Jessica Nirvana Ram
- Genre: Poetry
- Publisher: Game Over Books
- Publication date: September 2024
- ISBN: 978-1-955602-18-1

Earthly Gods is a 2024 debut poetry collection by Jessica Nirvana Ram, published by Game Over Books.

== Form ==
The book explores faith, matrilineage, and diaspora through Ram's experience as an Indo-Guyanese first-generation woman, specifically drawing upon her grandmother's influence and Hindu ritual practice. In an interview with Full Stop, she discussed the urgency she faced to speak about the nuances of her heritage in the landscape of contemporary poetry, stating:

"I think we don’t always fit neatly into preordained boxes like Asian American or even Caribbean–so to explore and write about the Indo-Guyanese experience, I felt certain levels of pressure as well. How do I do this right? How do I be true to my experiences while also being true to my family’s history? Can I include creole in my poetry even though it feels foreign on my tongue?"

== Critical reception ==
Poetry Northwest praised the book's interrogation of selfhood and devotion, finding that it had "a strong sense of adoration and gratitude for the women—mainly, her grandmother—who raised the speaker."

The Bear Review praised how it treated Indo-Caribbean and Guyanese identity and embraced "the marrow of the turmoil involved with these necessary transformations," writing that "Ram is not averse to plumbing the depths of that which is tender, inflamed, uncomfortable."

In a craft dissection of the poem "i am unfit to raise daughters" from the book, Joanna Acevedo called it not only "emotionally taut" but also lauded the way that punctuation served to create a disjointed experience for the reader, comparing Ram's usage of the slash to Natalie Diaz's: "In the way that Ram uses them, slashes can be a way to wrangle some of that complex language that feels too difficult to take on all at once. Emotions can be complicated, and giving them a repetitive structure might help access them more evenly on the page."
