= Topock Elementary School District =

School district in Arizona, United States

Topock School District 12

Location
- PO Box 370; Topock, Arizona 86436 United States

Other information
- Website: topockazschool.com

Topock School District 12 is a public school district based in Mohave County, Arizona.

The district includes the census-designated places of Topock and Golden Shores. It feeds the Colorado River Union High School District.
