= Mohave High School =

High school in Arizona, U.S.

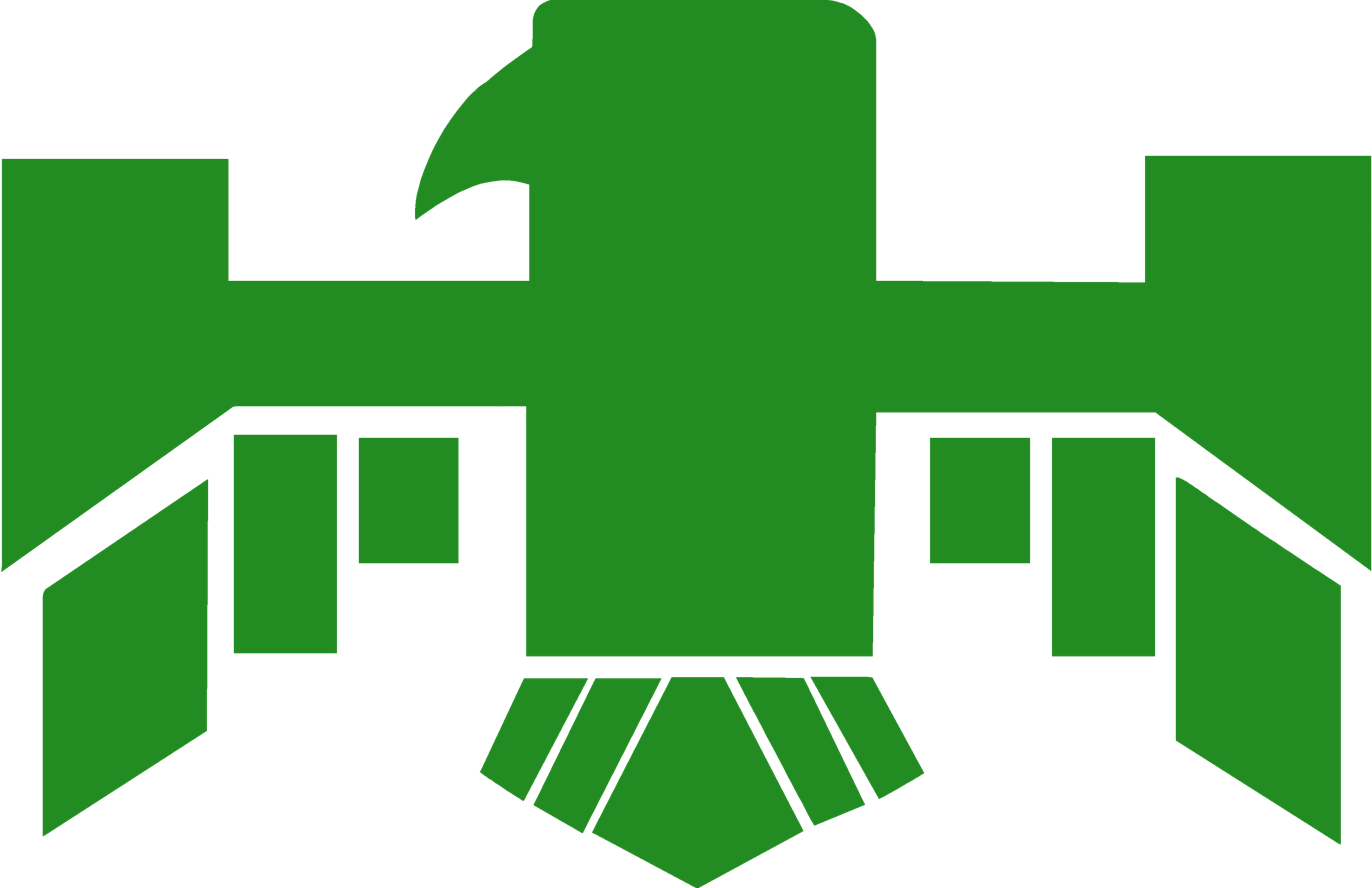
- Logo of Mohave High School, Bullhead City, Arizona, 86442

Location
- 2251 Highway 95; Bullhead City, Arizona 86442; United States; 35°06′21″N 114°36′00″W

Information
- Type: High School
- Established: 1969 (57 years ago)
- School district: Colorado River Union High School District
- Superintendent: Tim Richard
- CEEB code: 030032
- Principal: Kathleen Giannamore
- Staff: 55.00 (FTE)
- Grades: 9–12
- Enrollment: 1,067(2024–2025)
- Student to teacher ratio: 19.40
- Campus type: Urban
- Colors: Forest Green and Vegas Gold
- Mascot: Thunderbirds; T-Birds
- Website: mhs.cruhsd.org

Mohave High School is the high school for Bullhead City, Arizona. It is operated by the Colorado River Union High School District.

== Athletics ==
The Thunderbirds were the Class B state basketball runners-up in the 1972–73 season, won the Class B state football title in 1973, and were the Class B state football runners-up in the 1974 season. (Class B was the equivalent to the 2A Conference.)

The Thunderbirds were the 4A Division II state basketball champions in 2006.

The Thunderbirds placed 1st place in Division 2 of Cheerleading in the 2013–2014 Season at the AIA Spiritline State Qualifier on November 9, 2014, taking place at Estrella Foothills High School in Goodyear, Arizona.

Mohave High School has an award-winning marching band. In 2016, they won caption awards for Best Percussion, Best Auxiliary, and Best overall feel. The Mohave High Marching Band or "Thunder Band" placed 14th in State Finals in 2016.

In 2018, Mohave's softball team gained honors through winning the 4A Grand Canyon region championship, as well as placing fourth in the 4A State Tournament. Head coach, Shannon S Patterson, also gained honors. She received 4A Grand Canyon region coach of the year in 2018, and 4A conference coach of the year in 2018.

== Notable alumni ==
- J. J. Ambrose, professional mixed martial artist
- Joshua Bruns, professional wrestler and former college football player
- Seamus Dever, actor
