= Mohave traditional narratives =

Mohave traditional narratives include myths, legends, tales, and oral histories preserved by the Mohave people on the lower Colorado River in southeastern California, western Arizona, and southern Nevada.

Mohave oral literature has its closest links with the traditional narratives of the other Yuman-speaking groups of southern California, western Arizona, and northern Baja California. There are also close similarities with the oral literature of the Takic groups of southern California. See also Traditional narratives (Native California).

Two features are unusual in Mohave narratives. The Mohave believed that in dreaming, particular while still in their mothers' wombs, they traveled back to the time of creation and directly witnessed the events of their mythology. The Mohave also provided a rare example of a detailed semi-historical narrative of travels and wars with an extended internal chronology that was generally consistent.

== Online examples of Mohave narratives ==
- "Two Myths of the Mission Indians of California" by Alfred L. Kroeber (1906)
- The North American Indian by Edward S. Curtis (1908)

== See also ==
- Mojave language

== Sources for Mohave narratives ==
- Crawford, Judith. 1978. "Coyote and Crane (Mohave)". In Coyote Stories, edited by William Bright, pp. 121-123. International Journal of American Linguistics Native American Texts Series No. 1. University of Chicago Press. (Narrated by Robert S. Martin in 1968.)
- Curtis, Edward S. 1907-1930. The North American Indian. 20 vols. Plimpton Press, Norwood, Massachusetts. (Creation myth, vol. 2, pp. 56-57.)
- Devereux, George. 1948. "Mohave Coyote Tales". Journal of American Folklore 61:233-255. (With commentary from a psychoanalytic perspective.)
- Grey, Herman. 1970. Tales from the Mohave. University of Oklahoma Press, Norman. (Retellings of traditional narratives by a Mohave man, addressed primarily to children.)
- Hinton, Leanne, and Lucille J. Watahomigie. 1984. Spirit Mountain: An Anthology of Yuman Story and Song. University of Arizona Press, Tucson. (Includes Mohave narratives, pp. 285-290.)
- Kroeber, A. L. 1902. "A Preliminary Sketch of the Mohave Indians". American Anthropologist 4:276-285. (Brief notes on mythology.)
- Kroeber, A. L. 1906. "Two Myths of the Mission Indians of California". Journal of American Folklore 19:309-321. (Luiseño and Mohave myths, with comparative comments.)
- Kroeber, A. L. 1925. Handbook of the Indians of California. Bureau of American Ethnology Bulletin No. 78. Washington, D.C. (Detailed excerpts and discussion of narrative patterns, pp. 754-777.)
- Kroeber, A. L. 1948. "Seven Mohave Myths". Anthropological Records 11:1-70. University of California Press, Berkeley. (Narratives collected in 1903-1905, with analyses.)
- Kroeber, A. L. 1976. "A Mohave Historical Epic". Anthropological Records 11:71-176. University of California Press, Berkeley. (A unique clan migration legend told in 1902 by Inyo-kutavêre, with detailed analyses.)
- Kroeber, Theodora. 1959. The Inland Whale. University of California Press. (Retelling of one traditional narrative with commentary, pp. 121-138, 192-197.)
- Luthin, Herbert W. 2002. Surviving through the Days: A California Indian Reader. University of California Press, Berkeley. (A portion of the migration epic from Kroeber 1951, pp. 436-460.)
- Stewart, Kenneth M. 1983. "Mohave". In Southwest, edited by Alfonso Ortiz, pp. 55-70. Handbook of North American Indians, William C. Sturtevant, general editor, Vol. 10. Smithsonian Institution, Washington, D.C. (Brief summary of myths, pp. 65-66.)
