= Katherine, Arizona =

- Census-designated place
- Location within Arizona Location within the United States
- Coordinates: 35°13′14″N 114°33′42″W
- Country: United States
- State: Arizona
- County: Mohave

Area
  - Total: 4.62 sq mi (11.97 km^{2})
  - Land: 3.78 sq mi (9.79 km^{2})
  - Water: 0.84 sq mi (2.18 km^{2})
- Elevation: 689 ft (210 m)

Population (2020)
  - Total: 76
  - Density: 20.1/sq mi (7.76/km^{2})
- Time zone: UTC-7 (MST)
- Area code: 928
- FIPS code: 04-36920
- GNIS feature ID: 2582805

Katherine is an unincorporated community and census-designated place (CDP) in Mohave County, Arizona, United States. The population was 76 at the 2020 census, down from 103 at the 2010 census.

== Geography ==
Katherine is located on the western edge of Mohave County. It is bordered to the west by Lake Mohave on the Colorado River, which serves as the Nevada state line. It is bordered to the south by Bullhead City.

According to the United States Census Bureau, the CDP has a total area of 4.62 square miles (12.0 km^{2}), consisting of 3.78 square miles (9.8 km^{2}) of land and 0.84 square miles (2.2 km^{2}) of water.

== Demographics ==
Historical population
Census	Pop.	Note	%±
2010	103		—
2020	76		−26.2%
U.S. Decennial Census

As of the 2010 census, there were 103 people living in the CDP: 59 male and 44 female. 8 were 19 years old or younger, 12 were ages 20–34, 18 were between the ages of 35 and 49, 27 were between 50 and 64, and the remaining 38 were aged 65 and above. The median age was 57.1 years.

The racial makeup of the CDP was 98.1% White, 0.95% American Indian, and 0.95% Asian. 5.8% of the population were Hispanic or Latino of any race.

There were 57 households in the CDP, 29 family households (50.9%) and 28 non-family households (49.1%), with an average household size of 1.81. Of the family households, 25 were married couples living together, with 1 single-father and 3 single-mother households; the non-family households included 23 adults living alone: 15 male and 8 female.

The CDP contained 158 housing units, of which 57 were occupied and 101 were vacant.

== Education ==
It is in the Bullhead City School District and the Colorado River Union High School District.
