= Golden Shores, Arizona =

- Census-designated place
- Location within Arizona Location within the United States
- Coordinates: 34°46′32″N 114°29′20″W
- Country: United States
- State: Arizona
- County: Mohave

Area
  - Total: 8.14 sq mi (21.08 km^{2})
  - Land: 8.14 sq mi (21.08 km^{2})
  - Water: 0 sq mi (0.00 km^{2})
- Elevation: 679 ft (207 m)

Population (2020)
  - Total: 1,927
  - Density: 236.8/sq mi (91.43/km^{2})
- Time zone: UTC-7 (MST)
- ZIP Code: 86436 (Topock)
- Area code: 928
- FIPS code: 04-28190
- GNIS feature ID: 2582790

Golden Shores is a census-designated place (CDP) in Mohave County, Arizona, United States. The population was 1,927 at the 2020 census. Residents are part of the 86436 ZIP code area, with a mailing address of Topock.

== Geography ==
Golden Shores is located in western Mohave County. It is 4 miles (6 km) north of Interstate 40 where it crosses the Colorado River on Historic Route 66 and 15 miles (24 km) south of Mohave Valley. According to the United States Census Bureau, the CDP has a total area of 8.14 square miles (21.1 km^{2}), all land.

== Demographics ==
Historical population
Census	Pop.	Note	%±
2010	2,047		—
2020	1,927		−5.9%
U.S. Decennial Census

=== 2020 census ===
As of the 2020 census, Golden Shores had a population of 1,927. The median age was 61.7 years. 10.8% of residents were under the age of 18 and 40.0% of residents were 65 years of age or older. For every 100 females there were 107.4 males, and for every 100 females age 18 and over there were 106.6 males age 18 and over.

0.0% of residents lived in urban areas, while 100.0% lived in rural areas.

There were 966 households in Golden Shores, of which 12.4% had children under the age of 18 living in them. Of all households, 41.0% were married-couple households, 26.9% were households with a male householder and no spouse or partner present, and 23.4% were households with a female householder and no spouse or partner present. About 34.0% of all households were made up of individuals and 23.7% had someone living alone who was 65 years of age or older.

There were 1,624 housing units, of which 40.5% were vacant. The homeowner vacancy rate was 1.5% and the rental vacancy rate was 3.6%.

Racial composition as of the 2020 census
Race	Number	Percent
White	1,677	87.0%
Black or African American	9	0.5%
American Indian and Alaska Native	38	2.0%
Asian	14	0.7%
Native Hawaiian and Other Pacific Islander	2	0.1%
Some other race	36	1.9%
Two or more races	151	7.8%
Hispanic or Latino (of any race)	164	8.5%

=== 2010 census ===
As of the 2010 census, there were 2,047 people living in the CDP: 1,040 male and 1,007 female. 270 were 19 years old or younger, 139 were ages 20–34, 284 were between the ages of 35 and 49, 575 were between 50 and 64, and the remaining 779 were aged 65 and above. The median age was 59.3 years.

The racial makeup of the CDP was 94.2% White, 1.0% American Indian, 0.3% Black or African American, 0.3% Asian, 0.1% Native Hawaiian and Other Pacific Islander, 2.3% Other, and 1.7% Two or More Races. 7.7% of the population were Hispanic or Latino of any race.

There were 1,011 households in the CDP, 578 family households (57.2%) and 433 non-family households (42.8.2%), with an average household size of 3.68. Of the family households, 454 were married couples living together, with 48 single fathers and 76 single mothers, while the non-family households included 340 adults living alone: 193 male and 147 female.

The CDP contained 1,637 housing units, of which 1,011 were occupied and 626 were vacant.

== Transportation ==
VegasAirporter is an airport shuttle service connecting Lake Havasu City and Golden Shores to McCarran International Airport in Las Vegas.

== Education ==
It is in the Topock Elementary School District and the Colorado River Union High School District.
