= Colorado River Union High School District =

School district in Mohave County, Arizona

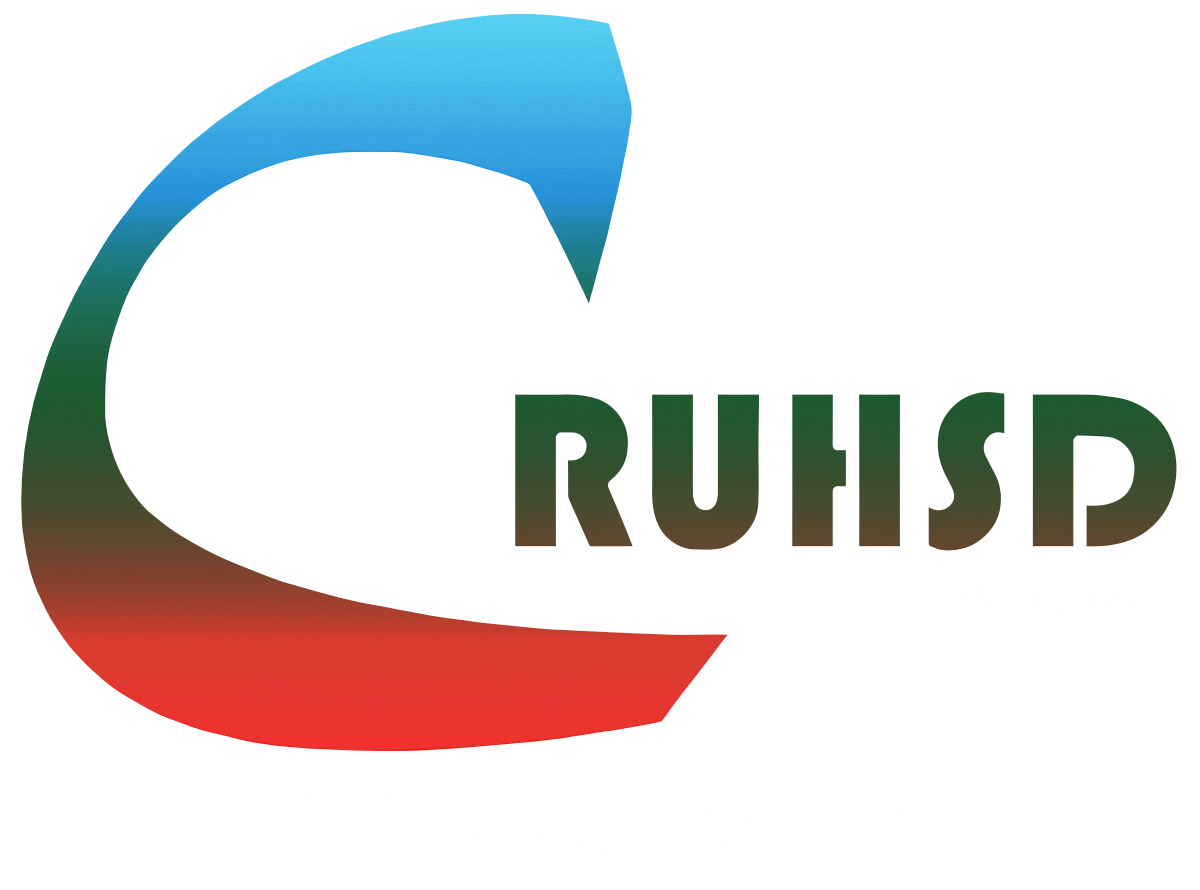

Address
- 2251 AZ-95 Bullhead City, Arizona, 86442; United States

District information
- Type: Public
- Grades: 9–12
- NCES District ID: 0400082

Students and staff
- Students: 1,809
- Teachers: 91.67
- Staff: 94.64
- Student–teacher ratio: 19.73

Other information
- Website: www.crsk12.org

The Colorado River Union High School District (also known as CRUHSD) is the high school district in Bullhead City, Arizona, USA, and surrounding areas. It operates three high schools, River Valley High School and Mohave High School, and CRUHSD Academy. As well as an event center: CRUHSD Anderson Auto Group Fieldhouse. The district's high schools have a combined enrollment of 1,755 students.

The Superintendent of the Colorado River Union High School District is Dr. Tim Richard

Its schools serve students from the Bullhead City Elementary School District, Mohave Valley Elementary School District, and Topock Elementary School District.

== Boundary ==
In addition to Bullhead City, the district includes the following census designated places: Arizona Village, Fort Mohave, Golden Shores, Katherine, Mesquite Creek, Mojave Ranch Estate, Mohave Valley, Topock, and Willow Valley.
