= Fort Mohave, Arizona =

- Census-designated place
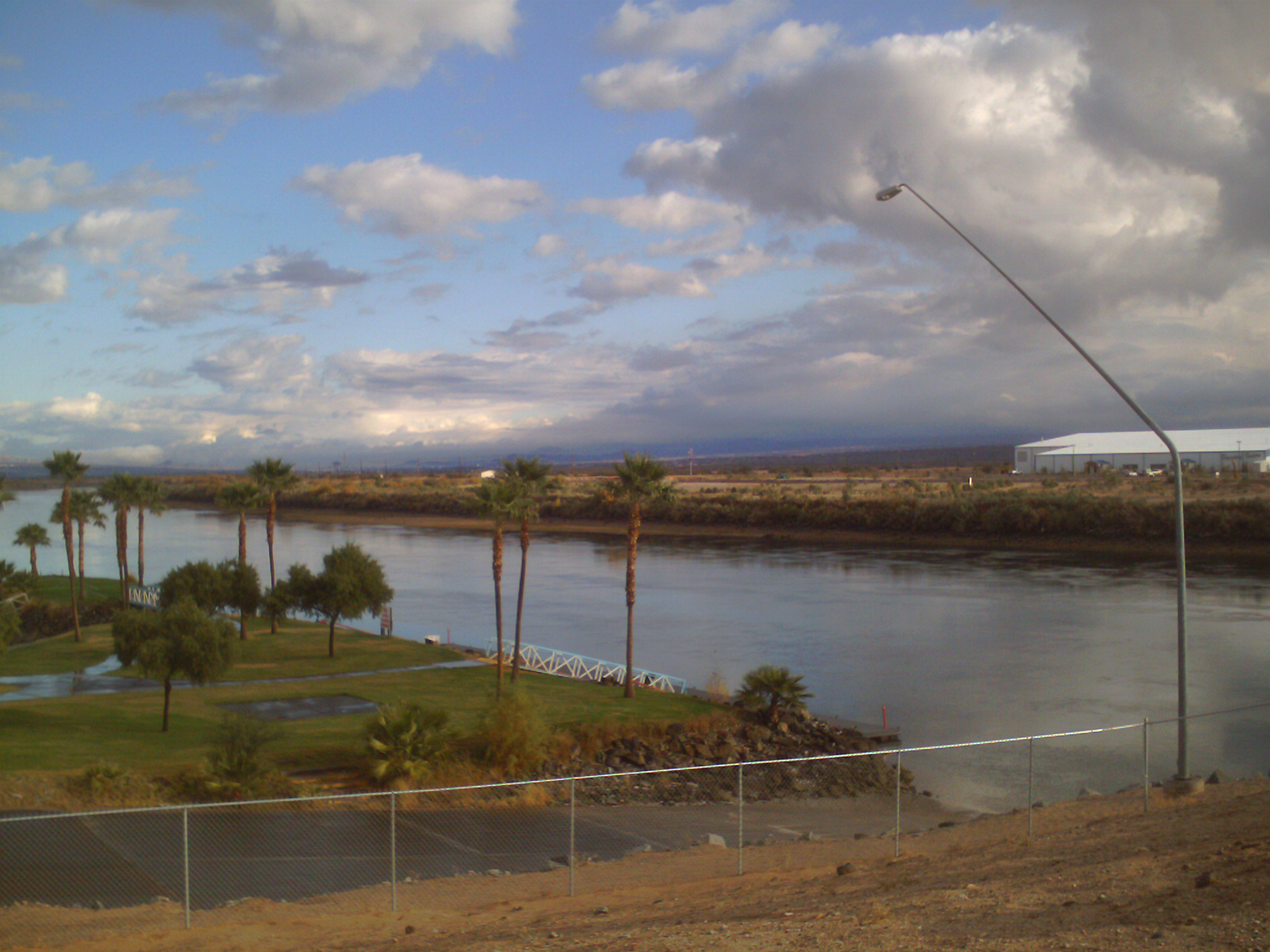
- View of Fort Mohave from Avi Resort & Casino

- Location in Mohave County, Arizona

- Location in the United States Fort Mohave (the United States)
- Coordinates: 35°59′32″N 114°34′18″W
- State: Arizona
- County: Mohave
- Founded: 1935
- Named for: Fort Mohave

Area
  - Total: 16.70 sq mi (43.25 km^{2})
  - Land: 16.70 sq mi (43.25 km^{2})
  - Water: 0 sq mi (0.00 km^{2})
- Elevation: 545 ft (166 m)

Population (2020)
  - Total: 16,190
  - Density: 969.5/sq mi (374.34/km^{2})
- Time zone: MST
- ZIP codes: 86426
- Area code: 928
- FIPS code: 04-24895
- GNIS feature ID: 2628855

Fort Mohave is an unincorporated community and census-designated place in Mohave County, Arizona, United States. It is named for a nearby fort that was used during the Mohave War. As of the 2020 census, the population of Fort Mohave was 16,190, up from 14,364 in 2010 and 8,919 in 2000. It is a suburb of Bullhead City. Its recent growth has made it the most populous unincorporated community in Mohave County.

The largest single employer in Fort Mohave is Valley View Medical Center. In 2013, Fort Mohave became the home of a 200+ acre photovoltaic solar generating plant. The plant was built east of Vanderslice Road between Joy Lane and Lipan Boulevard.

== History ==
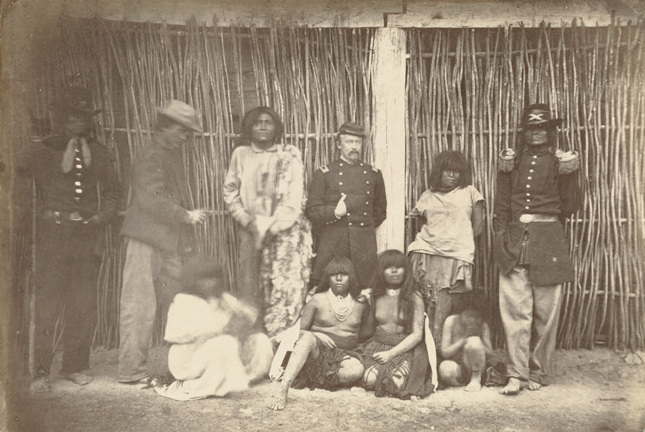
Mohave men and women and U.S. Army soldiers at Fort Mojave, circa 1868

The first known European to visit the area was Spanish explorer Melchor Díaz. He documented his travels in what is now northwestern Mohave County in 1540. He recounts meeting a large population of natives who referred to themselves as the Pipa Aha Macav, meaning "People by the River". From "Aha Macav" came the Spanish name "Mojave", which was later passed into English, where it is also spelled "Mohave". When most people refer to Fort Mohave, they use the spelling "Mohave", while the tribe retains the traditional Spanish spelling "Mojave".

During the Mohave War the fort was established as a base of U. S. Army military operations against the native Mohave people, who had been living in the area for centuries prior. In April 1861, during the early part of the American Civil War, the fort was abandoned, its garrison sent to secure Southern California from possible secession, and then sent to the east. It was subsequently garrisoned by Company B and Company I, 4th California Infantry Regiment, in May 1863. Company B remained for six months, but Company I remained until March 1865, when it was relieved by Company C, 7th California Infantry Regiment, until 1866 when Camp Mohave was again garrisoned by regular U.S. Army troops. The U.S. Army remained until September 29, 1890, when the War Department turned it over to the Indian Service by order of President Benjamin Harrison. It was given up by the Indian Service in 1935 and is now part of the Fort Mojave Indian Reservation.

== Geography ==
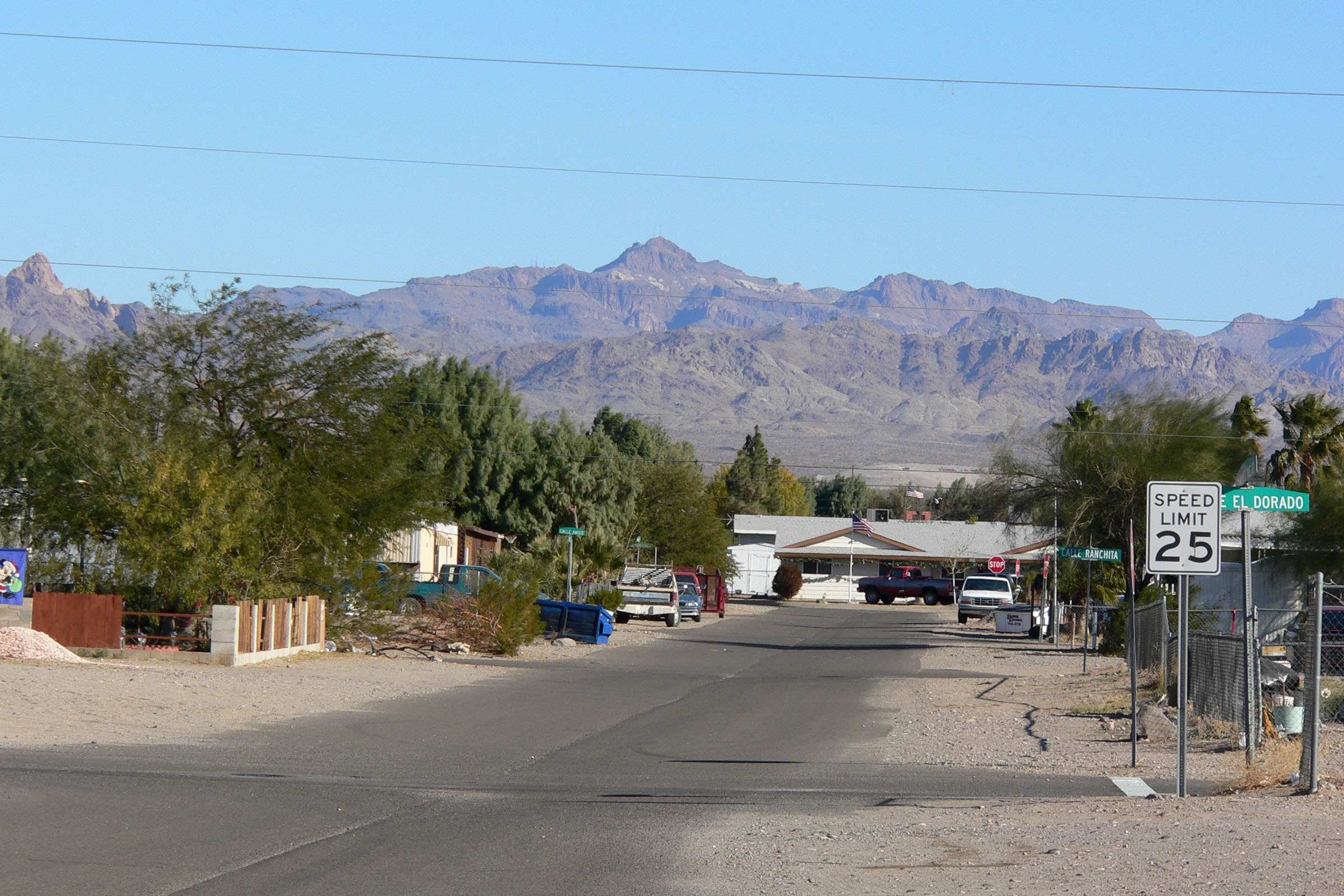
Camp Mohave

Fort Mohave is in western Mohave County along Arizona State Route 95. It is bordered to the north by Bullhead City, to the west by the Fort Mojave Indian Reservation, and to the south by unincorporated Mesquite Creek. AZ 95 leads north 10 miles (16 km) to the center of Bullhead City and south 12 miles (19 km) to Needles, California, across the Colorado River. Aztec Road leads west from the center of Fort Mohave across the Colorado into the southernmost corner of Nevada, 16 miles (26 km) south of Laughlin.

According to the U.S. Census Bureau, the Fort Mohave CDP has an area of 16.7 square miles (43 km^{2}), all of it recorded as land.

Many neighborhoods in Fort Mohave are built on man-made lakes, golf courses, and mesas with majestic mountain views. The newest golf course, Los Lagos Golf Club, is a Ted Robinson Sr. Signature Golf Course.

It is home to the Mojave Crossing Event Center, the largest stadium within 90 miles (140 km), serving all Mohave County for large indoor events. It has a seating capacity of 3,000 stadium style and 5,000 arena style.

== Demographics ==
Historical population
Census	Pop.	Note	%±
2000	8,919		—
2010	14,364		61.0%
2020	16,190		12.7%
U.S. Decennial Census

Fort Mohave is geographically between, and economically connected to, Bullhead City and Mohave Valley.

=== 2020 census ===
As of the 2020 census, Fort Mohave had a population of 16,190. The median age was 54.5 years. 17.1% of residents were under the age of 18 and 31.9% of residents were 65 years of age or older. For every 100 females there were 97.7 males, and for every 100 females age 18 and over there were 96.9 males age 18 and over.

94.1% of residents lived in urban areas, while 5.9% lived in rural areas.

There were 6,730 households in Fort Mohave, of which 21.4% had children under the age of 18 living in them. Of all households, 51.5% were married-couple households, 17.6% were households with a male householder and no spouse or partner present, and 22.3% were households with a female householder and no spouse or partner present. About 24.5% of all households were made up of individuals and 15.1% had someone living alone who was 65 years of age or older.

There were 8,073 housing units, of which 16.6% were vacant. The homeowner vacancy rate was 3.2% and the rental vacancy rate was 10.1%.

Racial composition as of the 2020 census
Race	Number	Percent
White	12,649	78.1%
Black or African American	208	1.3%
American Indian and Alaska Native	220	1.4%
Asian	271	1.7%
Native Hawaiian and Other Pacific Islander	25	0.2%
Some other race	1,049	6.5%
Two or more races	1,768	10.9%
Hispanic or Latino (of any race)	2,934	18.1%

== Education ==
The CDP is in the Mohave Valley Elementary School District and the Colorado River Union High School District.

Fort Mohave has two public elementary schools, Fort Mojave Elementary School and Camp Mohave Elementary School, both of which are a part of the Mohave Valley Elementary School District. There is also a public charter school, Young Scholar's Academy, All Beauty College, the Academy of Building Industries, and Desert Star.

== Infrastructure ==
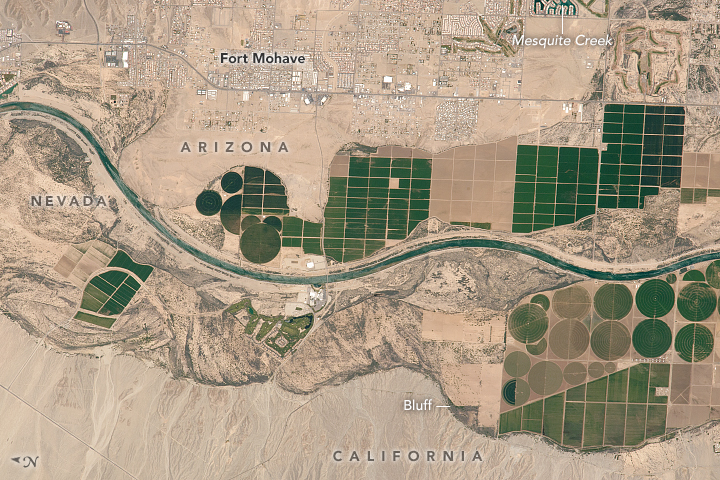
Fort Mohave and Mesquite Creek, Arizona. Irrigated agriculture is the major contributor to the local economy.

=== Health care ===
Fort Mohave is the location of the Valley View Medical Center, which opened in 2005. It is a 102,000-square-foot (9,500 m^{2}) facility with state-of-the-art technology. The hospital features 38 medical/surgical beds, 10 rehabilitation beds, a six-bed labor and delivery unit, a six-bed intensive care unit, four major operating rooms and two procedure rooms. In 2010, Valley View announced a 1.2 million Emergency Room expansion.

=== Emergency services ===
Fort Mohave is served by the Fort Mojave-Mesa Fire Department.

=== Transportation ===
Vegas Airporter provides service between Lake Havasu City, Fort Mohave, and Harry Reid International Airport in Las Vegas.

== See also ==
- Laughlin/Bullhead International Airport
- Laughlin, Nevada
- Mohave City, Arizona
- Oatman, Arizona
