= Avi Resort & Casino =

Hotel and casino in Nevada, United States

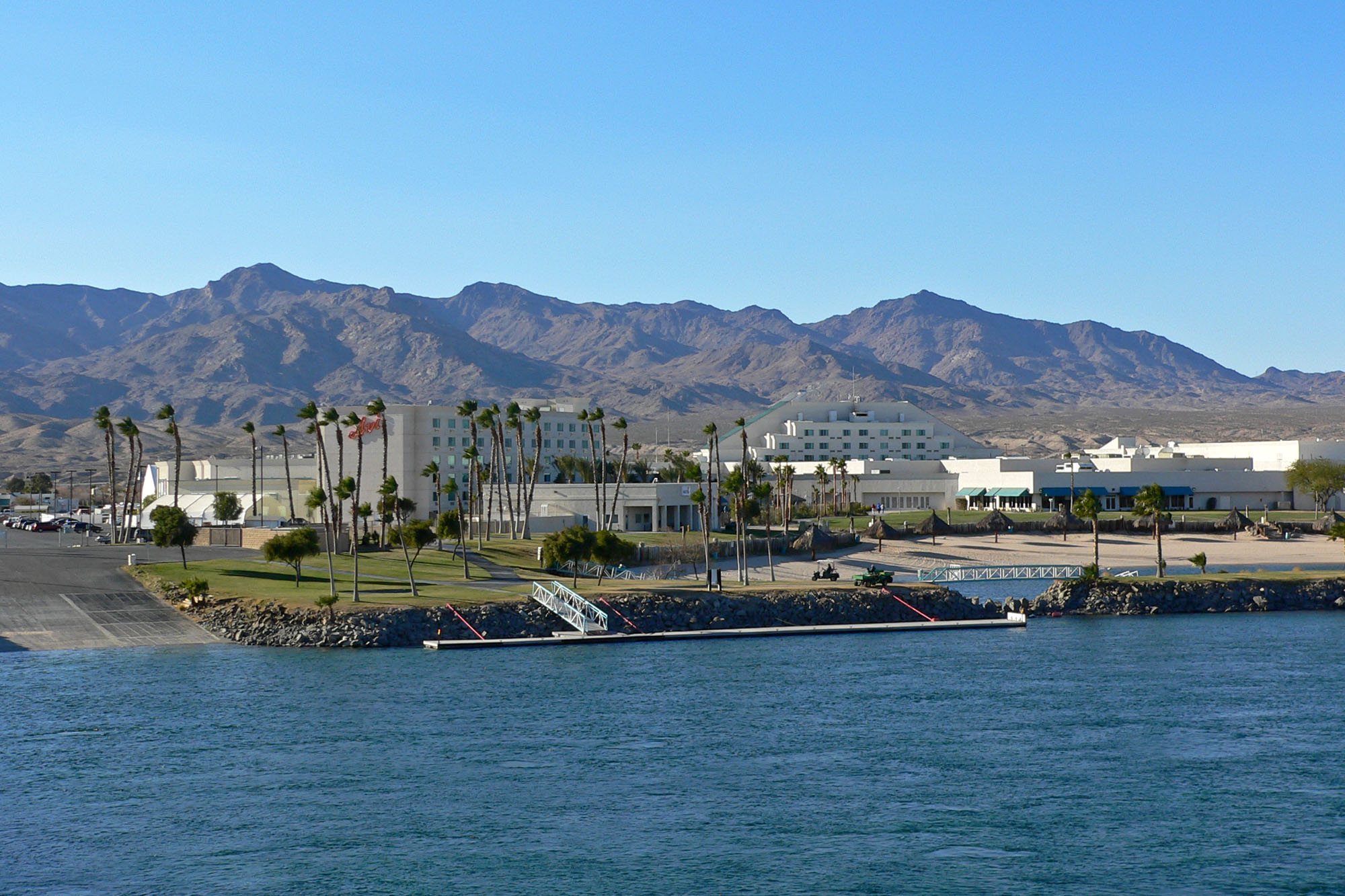
- Casino as seen from Arizona in 2006. The hills behind the casino are in California.
- Interactive map of Avi Resort & Casino
- Location: Laughlin, Nevada, U.S.; 10000 Aha Macav Parkway; 35.0165°N 114.6432°W
- Opened: February 17, 1995; 31 years ago
- Theme: Native American
- No. of rooms: 465
- Gaming space: 25,000 sq ft (2,300 m^{2})
- Signature attractions: Brenden Theatres
- Owner: Fort Mojave Tribe
- Operating license holder: Warner Gaming
- Website: www.avicasino.com

Avi Resort & Casino is a hotel and casino located near the southern tip of Nevada on the banks of the Colorado River in Laughlin, Nevada, next to Fort Mohave, Arizona. Within walking distance of the California and Arizona borders, it is owned by the Fort Mojave Tribe and operated by Warner Gaming. It has a 465-room hotel, a 25,000 sq ft (2,300 m^{2}) casino and a 260-space RV park with internet access.

The casino opened on February 17, 1995, and was built at cost of $60 million. It is one of two Nevada tribe owned Indian casinos located in Nevada, the other being the much-smaller Moapa Tribal Casino (2,500 square foot of gaming space), owned by the Moapa Band of Paiutes.
