= Mohave Valley Elementary School District =

School district in Arizona, United States

Address
- 8450 South Olive Avenue Mohave Valley, Arizona, 86440; United States

District information
- Type: Public
- Grades: PreK–8
- NCES District ID: 0405190

Students and staff
- Students: 986
- Teachers: 48.0
- Staff: 62.4
- Student–teacher ratio: 20.54

Other information
- Website: www.mvesd16.org

Mohave Valley School District 16 is a school district in Mohave County, Arizona. The district draws students from Fort Mojave and Mohave Valley as well as the Fort Mojave Indian Reservation.

The district includes the following census-designated places: Arizona Village, Fort Mohave, Mesquite Creek, Mojave Ranch Estate, Mohave Valley, and Willow Valley. It feeds into the Colorado River Union High School District.

== Schools ==
- Mohave Valley Junior High School (grades 6-8)
- Camp Mohave Elementary School (grades 3-5)
- Fort Mohave Elementary School (Kindergarten-grade 2)
