= River Valley High School (Arizona) =

Public school in Mohave County, Arizona

Coordinates: 34°53′39″N 114°34′12″W

Location
- 2250 E. Laguna Road; Mohave Valley, Arizona 86440; United States

Information
- School type: Public high school
- Motto: River Valley High School is here to educate, empower, and enable all students to become successful, informed citizens.
- Established: 1994 (32 years ago)
- School district: Colorado River Union HSD
- CEEB code: 030228
- Principal: Keith Moore
- Teaching staff: 32.00 (FTE)
- Grades: 9-12
- Enrollment: 565 (2023–2024)
- Student to teacher ratio: 17.66
- Colors: Red and silver
- Mascot: Dust Devils
- Website: rvhs.cruhsd.org

River Valley High School is a high school located in Mohave Valley, Arizona. The school is part of the Colorado River Union High School District. The school was established in 1992. The current administration for River Valley High School 2026–2027 school year are as follows:

- Keith Moore: Principal
- William Huthman: Assistant Principal
- Amber Maish: Athletic Director

The mascot for River Valley High School is a Dust Devil.
