= Mohave Valley, Arizona =

CDP in Mohave County, Arizona

- Census-designated place
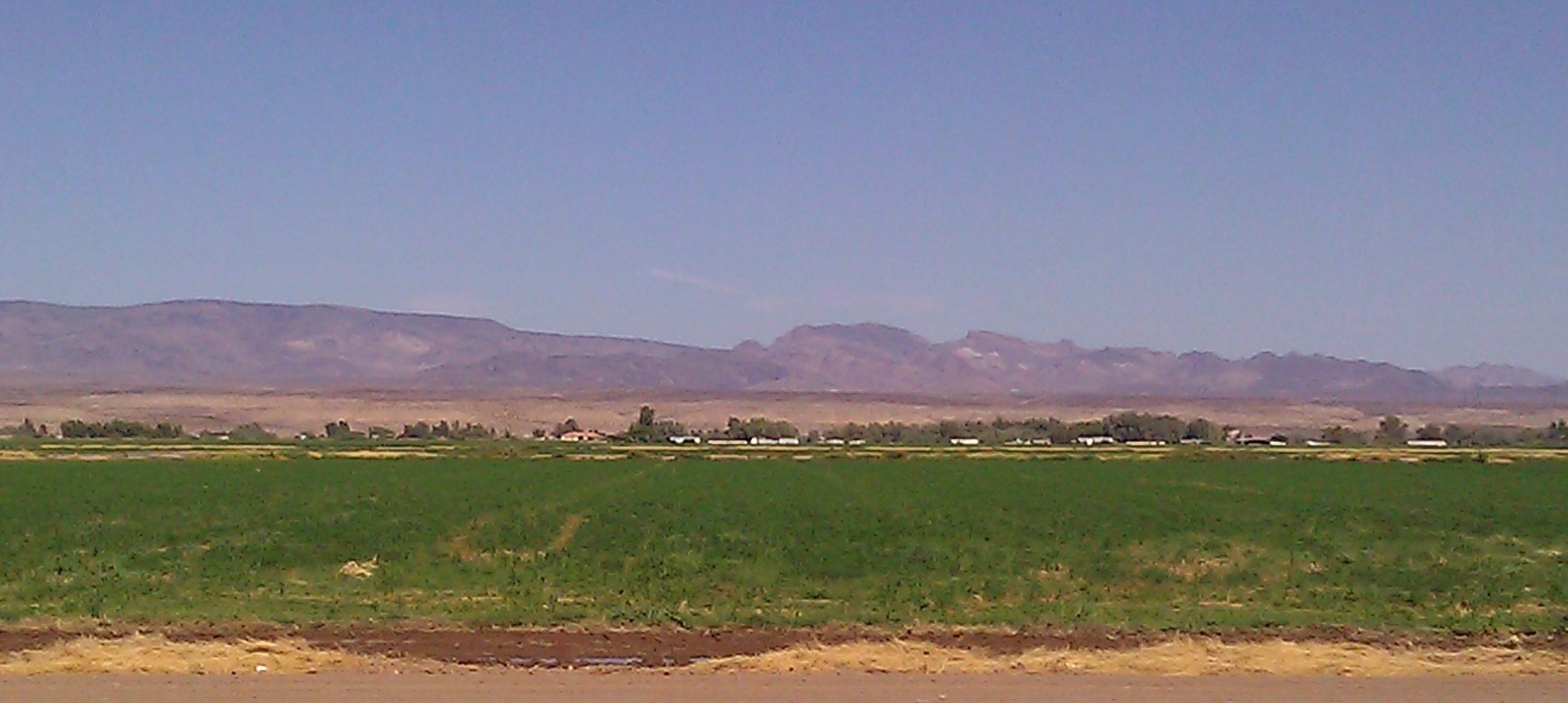

- Location in Mohave County and the state of Arizona

- Location within Arizona Location within the United States
- Coordinates: 34°53′09″N 114°34′21″W
- Country: United States
- State: Arizona
- County: Mohave

Area
  - Total: 14.04 sq mi (36.36 km^{2})
  - Land: 14.02 sq mi (36.32 km^{2})
  - Water: 0.015 sq mi (0.04 km^{2})
- Elevation: 469 ft (143 m)

Population (2020)
  - Total: 2,693
  - Density: 192.0/sq mi (74.15/km^{2})
- Time zone: UTC-7 (MST)
- ZIP codes: 86440, 86446
- Area code: 928
- FIPS code: 04-47400
- GNIS feature ID: 2408851

Mohave Valley ('Amat' 'Analy Uuhwely in Mojave) is an unincorporated community and census-designated place (CDP) in Mohave County, Arizona, United States. The population was 2,693 at the 2020 census. It is geographically connected to Needles, California, Fort Mohave and Bullhead City.

== History ==
The first recorded European to come through Mohave Valley was Melchor Díaz. He documented his travels in what is now northwestern Mohave County in 1540. He recounts meeting a large population of natives who referred to themselves as the Pipa Aha Macav, meaning "People by the River". From "Aha Macav" came the shortened name "Mojave" (also spelled "Mohave"). While Mohave Valley and Mohave County use the modern English spelling, the tribe retains the traditional Spanish spelling "Mojave". Both are correct, and both are pronounced "Moh-hah-vee".

== Geography ==
Mohave Valley is located in western Mohave County in the valley of the same name, drained by the Colorado River. The CDP is on the east side of Arizona State Route 95, which leads 3 miles (5 km) north to Fort Mohave, 16 miles (26 km) north to Bullhead City, and 6 miles (10 km) south to Needles, California, across the Colorado River. The Mohave Valley CDP is bordered to the south by Arizona Village, to the west by Willow Valley, and to the north by Mohave Ranch Estates, all CDPs.

According to the United States Census Bureau, the Mohave Valley CDP has a total area of 14.0 square miles (36 km^{2}), of which 0.02 square miles (0.05 km^{2}), or 0.11%, are water.

== Demographics ==
Historical population
Census	Pop.	Note	%±
1990	6,962		—
2000	13,694		96.7%
2010	2,616		−80.9%
2020	2,693		2.9%

=== 2020 census ===
As of the 2020 census, Mohave Valley had a population of 2,693. The median age was 49.1 years. 18.8% of residents were under the age of 18 and 24.0% of residents were 65 years of age or older. For every 100 females there were 111.2 males, and for every 100 females age 18 and over there were 107.0 males age 18 and over.

12.0% of residents lived in urban areas, while 88.0% lived in rural areas.

There were 1,069 households in Mohave Valley, of which 26.4% had children under the age of 18 living in them. Of all households, 47.4% were married-couple households, 19.5% were households with a male householder and no spouse or partner present, and 22.7% were households with a female householder and no spouse or partner present. About 25.5% of all households were made up of individuals and 14.0% had someone living alone who was 65 years of age or older.

There were 1,331 housing units, of which 19.7% were vacant. The homeowner vacancy rate was 2.7% and the rental vacancy rate was 6.6%.

Racial composition as of the 2020 census
Race	Number	Percent
White	2,109	78.3%
Black or African American	16	0.6%
American Indian and Alaska Native	95	3.5%
Asian	16	0.6%
Native Hawaiian and Other Pacific Islander	14	0.5%
Some other race	209	7.8%
Two or more races	234	8.7%
Hispanic or Latino (of any race)	511	19.0%

=== 2000 census ===
As of the 2000 census, there were 13,694 people, 5,217 households, and 3,850 families residing in the CDP. The population density was 302.6 inhabitants per square mile (116.8/km^{2}). There were 6,672 housing units at an average density of 147.4 per square mile (56.9/km^{2}). The racial makeup of the CDP was 90.8% White, 0.5% Black or African American, 2.3% Native American, 0.9% Asian, 0.1% Pacific Islander, 3.3% from other races, and 2.1% from two or more races. 12.0% of the population were Hispanic or Latino of any race.

There were 5,217 households, out of which 29.6% had children under the age of 18 living with them, 59.4% were married couples living together, 9.1% had a female householder with no husband present, and 26.2% were non-families. 19.0% of all households were made up of individuals, and 8.1% had someone living alone who was 65 years of age or older. The average household size was 2.61 and the average family size was 2.94.

In the CDP, the population was spread out, with 24.6% under the age of 18, 5.7% from 18 to 24, 25.8% from 25 to 44, 27.4% from 45 to 64, and 16.5% who were 65 years of age or older. The median age was 41 years. For every 100 females, there were 101.9 males. For every 100 females age 18 and over, there were 100.9 males.

The median income for a household in the CDP was $34,321, and the median income for a family was $38,897. Males had a median income of $29,719 versus $21,271 for females. The per capita income for the CDP was $16,287. About 7.9% of families and 11.0% of the population were below the poverty line, including 15.5% of those under age 18 and 6.1% of those age 65 or over.

== Agriculture ==
Agriculture constitutes a major portion of Mohave Valley's economy. Main crops are cotton and alfalfa.

== Education ==
The CDP is in the Mohave Valley Elementary School District and the Colorado River Union High School District.

High school students attend River Valley High School in the Colorado River Union High School District and also have the option to attend the Academy of Building Industries Public Charter High School located in Fort Mohave, Arizona, or the Aha Macav High School on the Fort Mojave Indian Reservation.

== See also ==
- Laughlin/Bullhead International Airport
- Mohave people
