= Mojave language =

Native language of the Mohave people along the Colorado River, United States

Mohave
- Mojave
- Hamakhav
- Native to: United States
- Region: Arizona and California
- Ethnicity: 2,000 Mohave people (2007)
- Native speakers: (65–85 cited 1994)
- Language family: Yuman–Cochimí: Core Yuman; River Yuman; Mohave

Language codes
- ISO 639-3: mov Mohave
- Glottolog: moha1256 Mohave
- ELP: Mojave

Mohave or Mojave (Note: "Mohave" as per Ethnologue ("alternate name Mojave"), Glottolog, Merriam-Webster Dictionary ("less commonly Mojave"), American Heritage Dictionary ("also Mojave"), and Collins English Dictionary ("or Mojave").) is the native language of the Mohave people along the Colorado River in northwestern Arizona, southeastern California, and southwestern Nevada. Approximately 70% of the speakers reside in Arizona, while approximately 30% reside in California. It belongs to the River branch of the Yuman language family, together with Quechan and Maricopa.

The Mojave language became endangered during the manifest destiny movement of the 19th century when Mohave and other Native American children were taken away from their parents and tribes to be placed in boarding schools, where they were prohibited from speaking their language. The schools went so far as to prohibit students from speaking their native tongue even with their parents when they occasionally visited home; many parents did not speak English.

== History ==
At the turn of the 19th century the United States began expanding further west and settlers began encountering more Native Americans. Many of these interactions resulted in violence and death as the settlers viewed the indigenous people as nuisances to westward expansion. At this time, the concept of unilineal evolution was prevalent within the social sciences and society in general. Because of this, native peoples were thought of as lesser beings or "Noble Savages" free from the burden of civilization yet encompassed by their baser instincts. As a means to lessen the altercation with the indigenous people of the west, the United States government began American Indian boarding schools. The purpose of these schools was to assimilate Native American children from the ages of 10 to 18 into European American culture, weakening their native culture and making them more compliant with the government's territorial expansion. This was accomplished by shearing their hair, replacing their native dress, teaching them English, Math, History, and giving them vocational skills. The Mojave tribe were no exception. In 1890 Fort Mojave was opened by Thomas J. Morgan, The Commissioner of Indian Affairs, as an Indian school to serve children from the Mojave and Hualapai tribes. The school remained open until 1931 after the Meriam Report concluded off reservation Indian schools a failure.

== Phonology ==
All claims and examples in this section come from Munro (1974) unless otherwise noted. Mojave phonology is similar to that of Maricopa. One difference is that in the 19th century Mohave speakers shifted the sounds [s] and [ʂ] (similar to sh as in "shack") to [θ] (th as in "thick") and [s], respectively.

=== Consonants ===
		Labial	Dental	Alveolar	Retroflex	Palatal	Velar		Uvular		Glottal	
		Labial	Dental	Alveolar	Retroflex	Palatal	plain	rnd.	plain	rnd.	plain	rnd.
Plosive		p		t	ʈ	kʲ	k	kʷ	q	qʷ	ʔ	
Affricate						t͡ʃ						
Fricative	voiceless		θ	s	ʂ						h	hʷ
Fricative	voiced	v	ð									
Nasal		m		n	ɳ	ɲ						
Liquid				l, r		lʲ						
Glide						j		w				

The retroflex phonemes /ɳ/ and /ʈ/ only occur in very few words.

=== Vowels ===
Mohave has five vowel qualities, with length distinction and the weak vowel /ə/.

	Front	Central	Back
Close	i, iː		u, uː
Mid	e, eː	ə	o, oː
Open		a, aː	

=== Audio example ===
Hubert McCord, one of the four tribal leaders of the Mojave tribe, is fluent in the Mojave language. McCord has worked with poet Natalie Diaz (see revitalization below) documenting Mojave stories and songs. In one video, McCord sings while taking a group of tribal youth on a short voyage around the Colorado river.

== Morphology ==
The basic structure of a word in Mojave consists of a single vowel. Consonants can be added both prior to and following the vowel. Both derivational and inflectional morphemes are created by the addition of mostly prefixes, along with potential suffixes.

Structure of a Syllable
		v		
	c-	v	-c	
c-	c-	v	-c	-c

Tenses in Mojave are split up into present/past and future. The past and present tense are marked by the usage of -k, -m, and -pc^. The future tense is marked by the lack of any such marker. First person subjects are expressed through the usage of ?- while n^j represents first person arguments. 2nd person subjects and arguments are denoted by m- and 3rd is hallmarked by the lack of either of the two. Verbs are typically denoted via the addition of the suffixes -k and -m.

== Syntax ==
For the word order in the Mojave language, noun phrases containing the subject occur first with the verb occurring last in sentences with additional non-subject nouns, i.e. the object of a sentence, occurring between the subject and the verb. Also, the subject of a sentence is typically marked with the morpheme {-č}.Thereby, the Mojave language can be described as a subject-object-verb, SOV, language. Even with that SOV description, however, there are instances in which there are not more than one or two specified, marked, or described noun phrases in a sentence because any noun phrase complement of a verb can be omitted as context determines. Moreover, word order is essential with utterances that contain a direct and an indirect object, in which both are unmarked by a morpheme. The basic form of such utterances is that the indirect object comes before the direct object. For example, here are tables in a three-line gloss of two sentences with captioned differences:

hatčoq ʔavi:-m ʔ-əta:v-k
dog rock-with 1SG.SUBJ-hit-tense
I hit the dog with a rock

Jim-č havik kʷikʷay θinʸaʔa:k sukam-m
Jim-SUBJ sibling cow female sell-TNS
Jim sold his brother a cow

To negate in Mojave one would need to use one of the three apparent devices or methods. That is with the suffix -mot- which precedes a tense marker in lexical verbs, with the negative verb kava:r which is used on its own and literally means in English "to not", or with the suffix -poʔa:ve (the other variant is -poʔa:və) which is at times used with utterances that contain indefinite pronouns.

== Revitalization ==
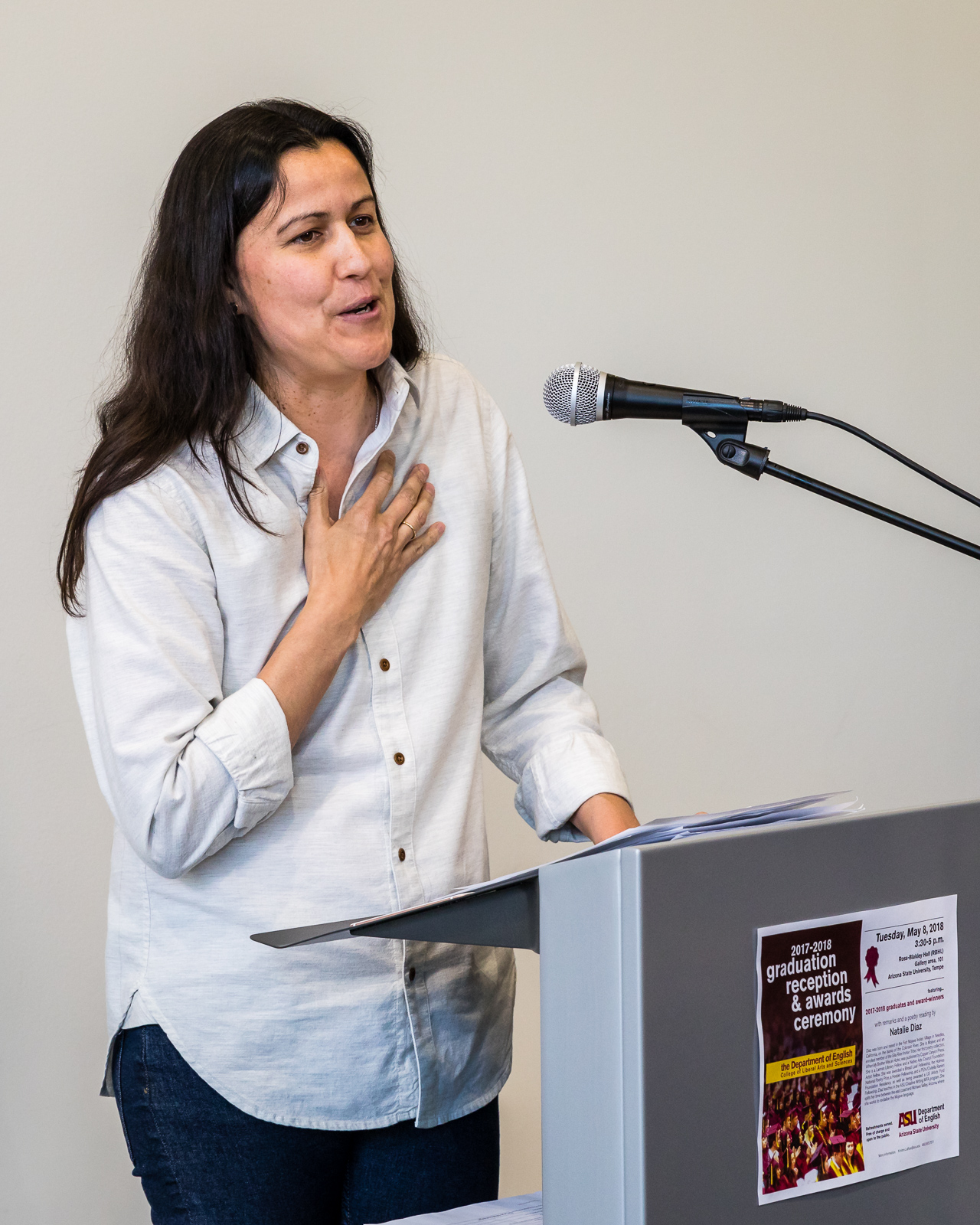
Poet and Mojave language activist Natalie Diaz at Arizona State University

As of 2012, the Center for Indian Education at Arizona State University "has facilitated workshops for both learners and speakers at the Fort Mojave Indian Reservation in northwest Arizona, California and Nevada. Fort Mojave has about 22 elders who speak some Mojave." The project is also bringing elders together with younger people to teach the traditional Mojave "bird songs."

The language preservation work of poet Natalie Diaz on the reservation was featured on PBS NewsHour in March 2012.

== See also ==
- Mohave traditional narratives

== Bibliography ==
- Munro, P. E. L. (1974). Topics in Mojave syntax (PhD dissertation). Ann Arbor: University of Michigan.
- Munro, Pamela (1976a). Mojave Syntax. New York: Garland. ISBN 0-8240-1970-9. OCLC 2401368.
- Munro, P. (1976b). "Subject copying, auxiliarization, and predicate raising: the Mojave evidence". International Journal of American Linguistics. 42 (2): 99–112. doi:10.1086/465398. S2CID 144595156.
- Munro, Pamela; Brown, Nellie; Brown, Judith G. (1992). A Mojave dictionary (PDF). UCLA Occasional Papers in Linguistics. Vol. 10.
- Penfield, S. D. (2005). "Mohave remembered". Journal of the Southwest: 81–105.
- Penfield, S. D.; Tucker, B. V. (2011). "From documenting to revitalizing an endangered language: where do applied linguists fit?". Language and Education. 25 (4): 291–305. doi:10.1080/09500782.2011.577219. S2CID 144213616.
- Weinberg, J. P.; Penfield, S. D. (2000). "Mohave Language Planning: Where has it been and where should it go from here?". Coyote Papers: Working Papers in Linguistics. Native American Languages.
