= Willow Valley, Arizona =

- Census-designated place
- Location in Mohave County and the state of Arizona

- Location within Arizona Location within the United States
- Coordinates: 34°55′47″N 114°37′25″W
- Country: United States
- State: Arizona
- County: Mohave

Area
  - Total: 4.97 sq mi (12.88 km^{2})
  - Land: 4.93 sq mi (12.78 km^{2})
  - Water: 0.039 sq mi (0.10 km^{2})
- Elevation: 479 ft (146 m)

Population (2020)
  - Total: 1,059
  - Density: 214.6/sq mi (82.84/km^{2})
- Time zone: UTC-7 (MST)
- ZIP code: 86440
- Area code: 928
- FIPS code: 04-83570
- GNIS feature ID: 2409600

Willow Valley is an unincorporated community and census-designated place (CDP) in Mohave County, Arizona, United States. The population was 1,059 as of the 2020 census.

== Geography ==
Willow Valley is located in western Mohave County. It is in the Mohave Valley, on the east side of the Colorado River. It is bordered to the east by the community of Mohave Valley and to the west across the Colorado by San Bernardino County, California.

Arizona State Route 95 runs along the eastern edge of the community, leading north 18 miles (29 km) to Bullhead City and south 5 miles (8 km) to Needles, California.

According to the United States Census Bureau, the Willow Valley CDP has a total area of 5.0 square miles (13 km^{2}), of which 0.04 square miles (0.10 km^{2}), or 0.76%, are water.

== Demographics ==
Historical population
Census	Pop.	Note	%±
2000	585		—
2010	1,062		81.5%
2020	1,059		−0.3%
U.S. Decennial Census

=== 2020 census ===
As of the 2020 census, Willow Valley had a population of 1,059. The median age was 58.8 years. 12.6% of residents were under the age of 18 and 34.3% of residents were 65 years of age or older. For every 100 females there were 116.6 males, and for every 100 females age 18 and over there were 114.4 males age 18 and over.

0.0% of residents lived in urban areas, while 100.0% lived in rural areas.

There were 544 households in Willow Valley, of which 16.2% had children under the age of 18 living in them. Of all households, 37.1% were married-couple households, 32.4% were households with a male householder and no spouse or partner present, and 24.1% were households with a female householder and no spouse or partner present. About 41.8% of all households were made up of individuals and 24.8% had someone living alone who was 65 years of age or older.

There were 1,304 housing units, of which 58.3% were vacant. The homeowner vacancy rate was 1.4% and the rental vacancy rate was 13.0%.

Racial composition as of the 2020 census
Race	Number	Percent
White	867	81.9%
Black or African American	4	0.4%
American Indian and Alaska Native	67	6.3%
Asian	7	0.7%
Native Hawaiian and Other Pacific Islander	7	0.7%
Some other race	21	2.0%
Two or more races	86	8.1%
Hispanic or Latino (of any race)	141	13.3%

=== 2000 census ===
At the 2000 census there were 585 people, 274 households, and 192 families living in the CDP. The population density was 601.9 inhabitants per square mile (232.4/km^{2}). There were 464 housing units at an average density of 477.4 per square mile (184.3/km^{2}). The racial makeup of the CDP was 93.16% White, 0.17% Black or African American, 1.71% Native American, 0.34% Asian, 1.88% from other races, and 2.74% from two or more races. 6.67% of the population were Hispanic or Latino of any race.

Of the 274 households 14.6% had children under the age of 18 living with them, 58.4% were married couples living together, 7.3% had a female householder with no husband present, and 29.6% were non-families. 24.1% of households were one person and 13.1% were one person aged 65 or older. The average household size was 2.14 and the average family size was 2.48.

The age distribution was 13.7% under the age of 18, 2.4% from 18 to 24, 21.5% from 25 to 44, 29.4% from 45 to 64, and 33.0% 65 or older. The median age was 56 years. For every 100 females, there were 101.0 males. For every 100 females age 18 and over, there were 98.0 males.

The median household income was $39,250 and the median family income was $41,406. Males had a median income of $25,147 versus $24,219 for females. The per capita income for the CDP was $16,956. None of the population or families were below the poverty line.

== Education ==
The CDP is in the Mohave Valley Elementary School District and the Colorado River Union High School District.
