= Mesquite Creek, Arizona =

CDP in Mohave County, Arizona

- Census-designated place
- Location in Mohave County and the state of Arizona

- Location within Arizona Location within the United States
- Coordinates: 34°57′38″N 114°34′17″W
- Country: United States
- State: Arizona
- County: Mohave

Area
  - Total: 1.02 sq mi (2.65 km^{2})
  - Land: 1.02 sq mi (2.65 km^{2})
  - Water: 0 sq mi (0.00 km^{2})
- Elevation: 525 ft (160 m)

Population (2020)
  - Total: 403
  - Density: 394.1/sq mi (152.18/km^{2})
- Time zone: UTC-7 (MST)
- ZIP code: 86440
- Area code: 928
- FIPS code: 04-46087
- GNIS feature ID: 2408824

Mesquite Creek is an unincorporated community and census-designated place (CDP) in Mohave County, Arizona, United States. The population was 403 at the 2020 census.

== Geography ==
Mesquite Creek is located in western Mohave County. It is bordered to the north by the CDP of Fort Mohave. Bullhead City is 15 miles (24 km) to the north, and Needles, California, is 9 miles (14 km) to the south, across the Colorado River.

According to the United States Census Bureau, the Mesquite Creek CDP has a total area of 1.0 square mile (2.6 km^{2}), all of it land.

== Demographics ==
Historical population
Census	Pop.	Note	%±
2000	205		—
2010	416		102.9%
2020	403		−3.1%
U.S. Decennial Census

As of the census of 2000, there were 205 people, 106 households, and 73 families residing in the CDP. The population density was 355.3 inhabitants per square mile (137.2/km^{2}). There were 142 housing units at an average density of 246.1 per square mile (95.0/km^{2}). The racial makeup of the CDP was 93% White, 1% Black or African American, 1% Native American, 2% from other races, and 3% from two or more races. 7% of the population were Hispanic or Latino of any race.

There were 106 households, out of which 2% had children under the age of 18 living with them, 64% were married couples living together, 3% had a female householder with no husband present, and 31% were non-families. 26% of all households were made up of individuals, and 18% had someone living alone who was 65 years of age or older. The average household size was 1.93 and the average family size was 2.23.

In the CDP, the population was spread out, with 6% under the age of 18, 1% from 18 to 24, 7% from 25 to 44, 42% from 45 to 64, and 45% who were 65 years of age or older. The median age was 64 years. For every 100 females, there were 93.4 males. For every 100 females age 18 and over, there were 92.0 males.

The median income for a household in the CDP was $33,125, and the median income for a family was $34,861. Males had a median income of $26,250 versus $23,750 for females. The per capita income for the CDP was $20,517. None of the families, and 7% of the population were living below the poverty line, including no under eighteens and 14% of those over 64.

== Education ==
The CDP is in the Mohave Valley Elementary School District and the Colorado River Union High School District.
