= Mohave people =

Indigenous people to the Colorado River in the Mojave Desert

Mojave People
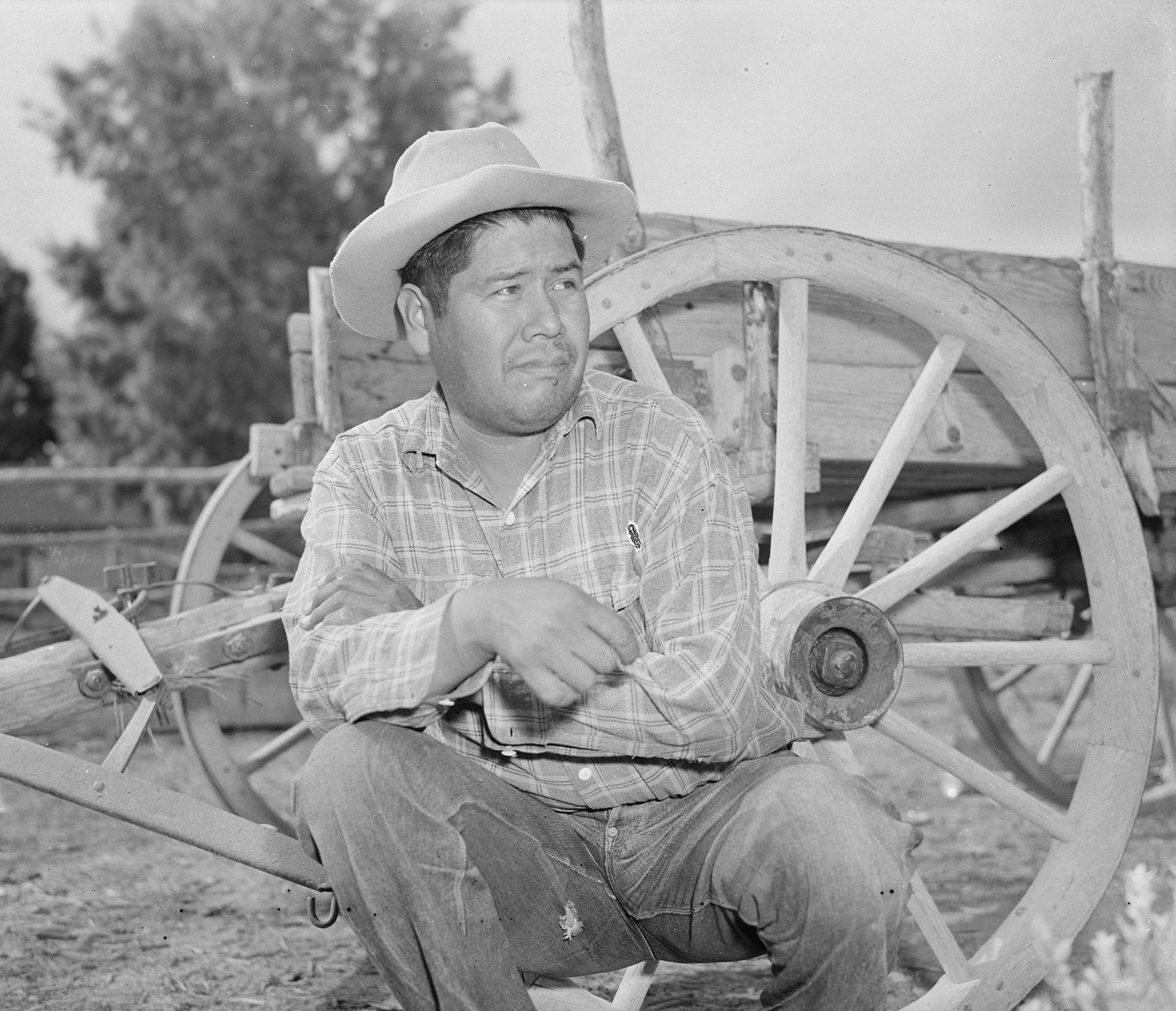
- Henry Welshe, Mojave tribal chairman of Colorado River Indian Reservation council, c. 1944–46

Total population
- 2,000 (Golla, 2007); 967 (1990)

Regions with significant populations
- United States (Arizona)

Languages
- Mojave, English

Religion
- Indigenous religion

Related ethnic groups
- Maricopa, Quechan, Walapai, Havasupai, and Yavapai

The Mohave or Mojave (Mojave: Aha Makhav) are a Native American people from the Colorado River region of the Mojave Desert in Arizona, California, and Nevada. They are enrolled in the federally recognized tribes, the Fort Mojave Indian Tribe of Arizona, California & Nevada and the Colorado River Indian Tribes of the Colorado River Indian Reservation.

Their Mojave language belongs to the Yuman language family.

The original Colorado River and Fort Mojave reservations were established in 1865 and 1870. Both reservations include substantial senior water rights for the Colorado River.

== Culture ==
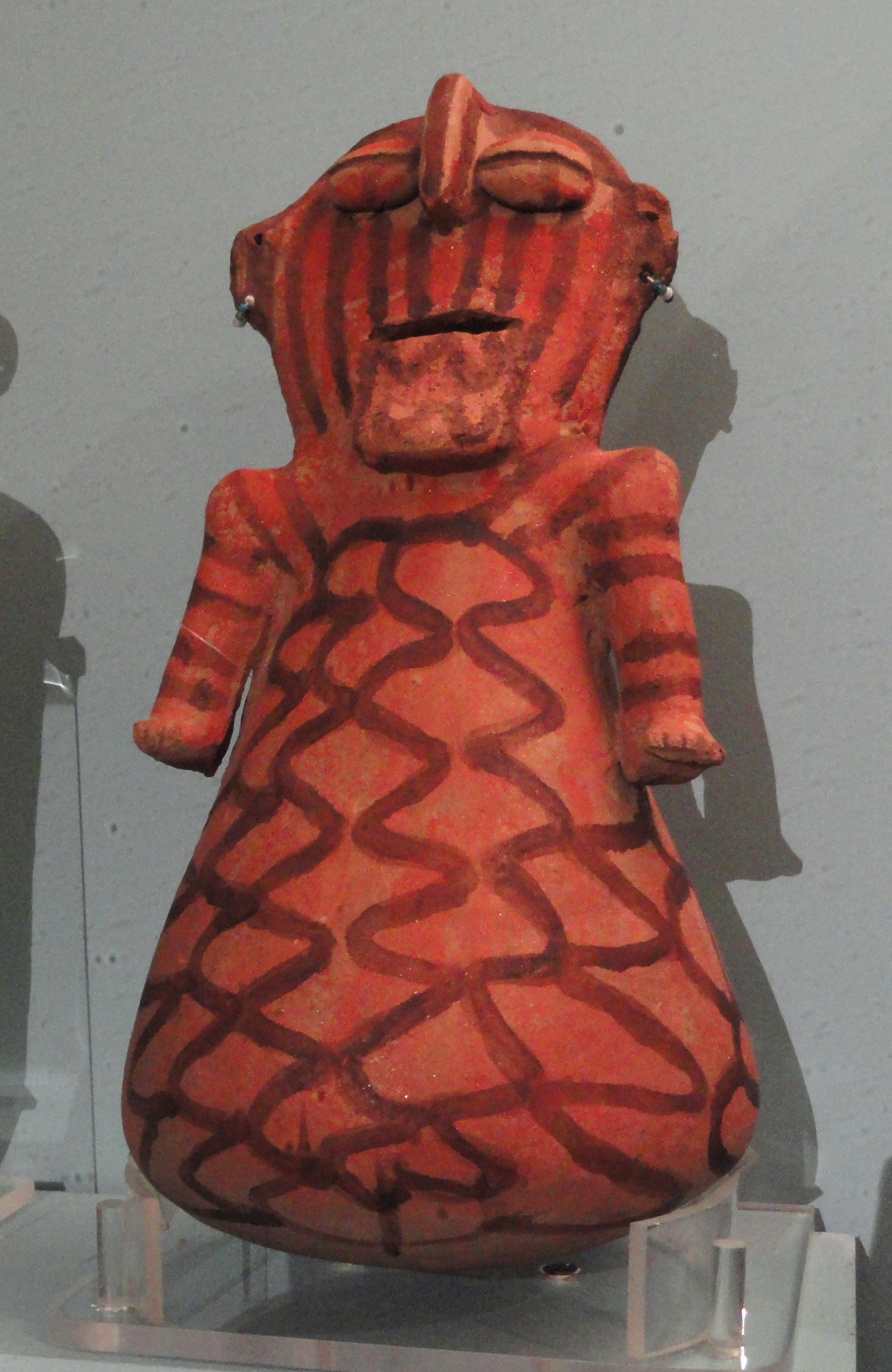
Mohave ceramic figurine with red slip and earrings, pre-1912, Peabody Museum of Archaeology and Ethnology

In the 1930s, George Devereux, a Hungarian-French anthropologist, did fieldwork and lived among the Mohave for an extended period of study. He published extensively about their culture and incorporated psychoanalytic thinking in his interpretation of their culture.

=== Language ===
The Mojave language belongs to the River Yuman branch of the Yuman language family. It is closely related to the Quechan and Maricopa languages.

In 1994, approximately 74 people in total on the Colorado River and Fort Mojave reservations spoke the language, according to linguist Leanne Hinton. The tribe has published language materials, and there are new efforts to teach the language to their children.

=== Religion ===
The Mohave creator is Matavilya, who gave Mojave people their clans. His little brother is Mastamho, who gave them the Colorado River and taught them how to plant. Historically, Mojave were agrarian; they planted in the fertile floodplain of the untamed river, following the age-old customs of the Aha cave. They have traditionally used the indigenous plant Datura as a deliriant hallucinogen in a religious sacrament. A Mohave who is coming of age must consume the plant in a rite of passage, in order to enter a new state of consciousness.

=== Cuisine ===
The Mohave planted corn, melons, beans, pumpkin and seeds of wild grasses. The Mojave Desert yielded various types of cacti that bore edible fruits, along with mesquite. The bean-like pods of the mesquite plant were pounded and crushed to extract the pulp. This pulp was then dried and ground into flour, which was combined with water to create cakes. Additionally, the crushed pods could be soaked in warm water to produce a sweet beverage. Meat was not a prevalent component of the Mohave diet, as there was a scarcity of game available for hunting. Occasionally, hunters ventured to the mountains located east of the river to pursue deer. Rabbits were captured using traps or curved throwing sticks for rabbit meat. More frequently, fish from the Colorado River constituted a significant part of the Mohave diet. A stew made from fish and corn was particularly favored among the tribe.

== History ==
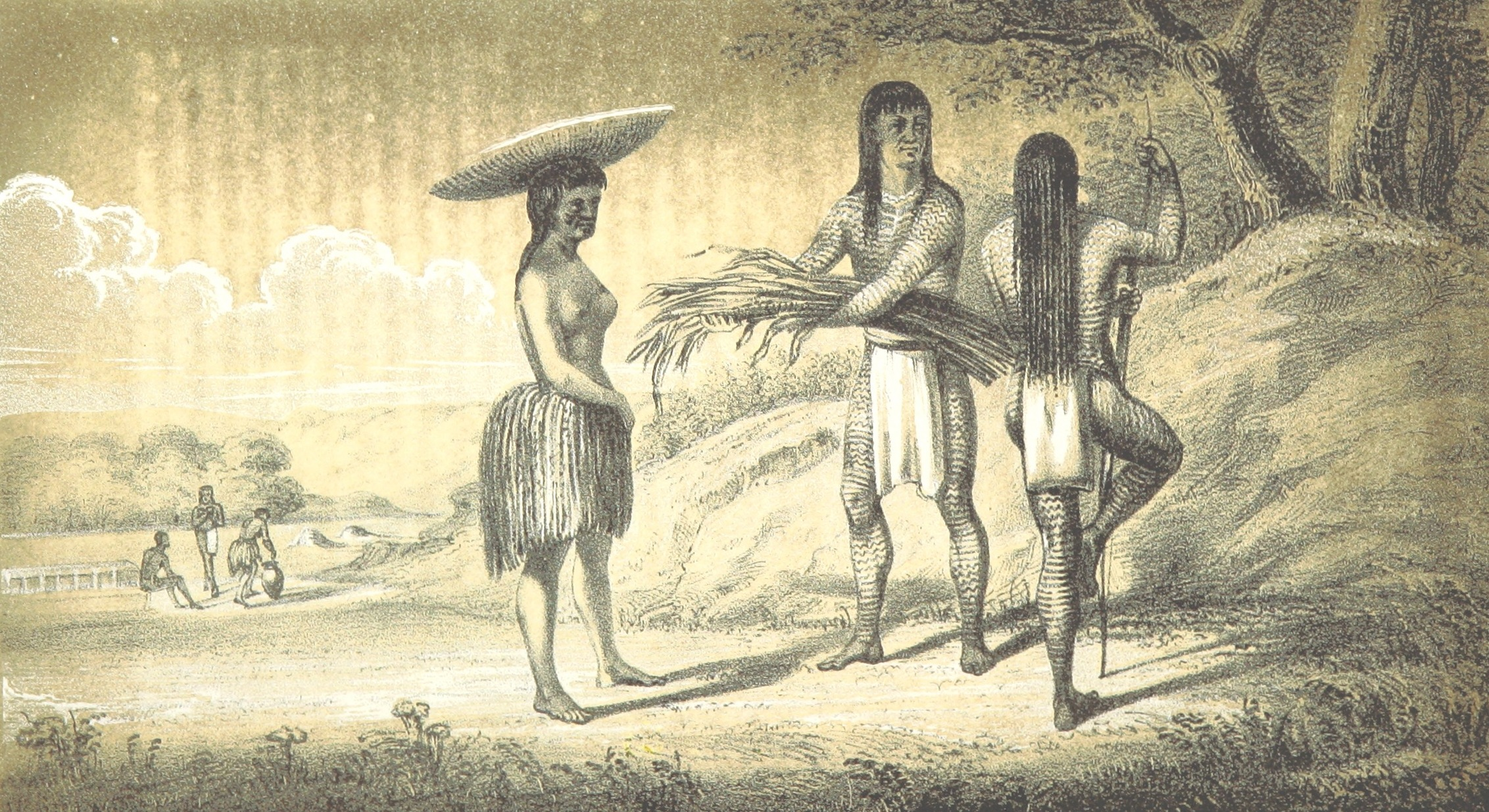
1851 drawing of Mohavi men and women made by Lorenzo Sitgreaves' topographical mission across Arizona in 1851.

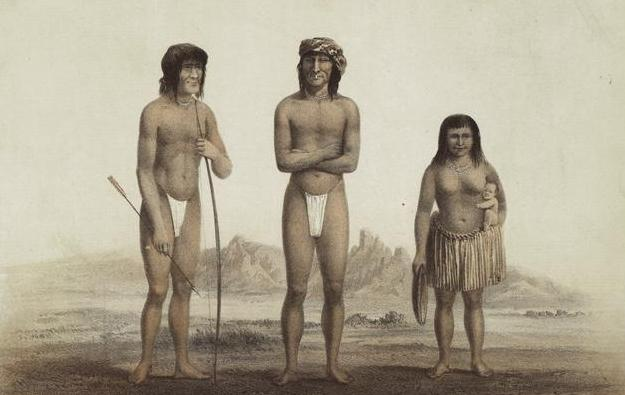
Chiefs Irataba and Cairook, with Mohave woman, by Balduin Möllhausen (1856)

Mohave woman.

Mohave man.

Early Mojave history is primarily oral history since the Mojave language was not written in precolonial times. Disease, outside cultures, and white encroachment on their territory disrupted their social organization. Together with having to adapt to a majority culture of another language, this resulted in interrupting the Mojave transmission of their stories and songs to the following generations.

The tribal name has been spelled in Spanish and English transliteration in more than 50 variations, such as Hamock avi, Amacava, A-mac-ha ves, A-moc-ha-ve, Jamajabs, and Hamakhav. This has led to misinterpretations of the tribal name, also partly traced to a translation error in Frederick W. Hodge's 1917 Handbook of the American Indians North of Mexico (1917). This incorrectly defined the name Mohave as being derived from hamock, (three), and avi, (mountain). According to this source, the name refers to the mountain peaks known as The Needles in English, located near the Colorado River. (The city of Needles, California is located a few miles north from here). But, the Mojave call these peaks Huukyámpve, which means "where the battle took place," referring to the battle in which the God-son, Mastamho, slew the sea serpent.

=== Ancestral lands ===
The Mojave held lands along the Colorado River, Aha Macav in their language, that stretched from Black Canyon, where the tall pillars of First House of Mutavilya loomed above the river, past Avi kwame or Spirit Mountain, the center of spiritual things, to the Quechan Valley, where the lands of other tribes began. As related to contemporary landmarks, their lands began in the north at Hoover Dam and ended about one hundred miles below Parker Dam on the Colorado River.

=== Early European contact ===
A Spanish expedition entered Mojave territory in 1604. Juan Onate led the expedition in search of silver. In 1775, Francisco Garcés, a Spanish friar, met with the Mojave.

=== 19th century ===
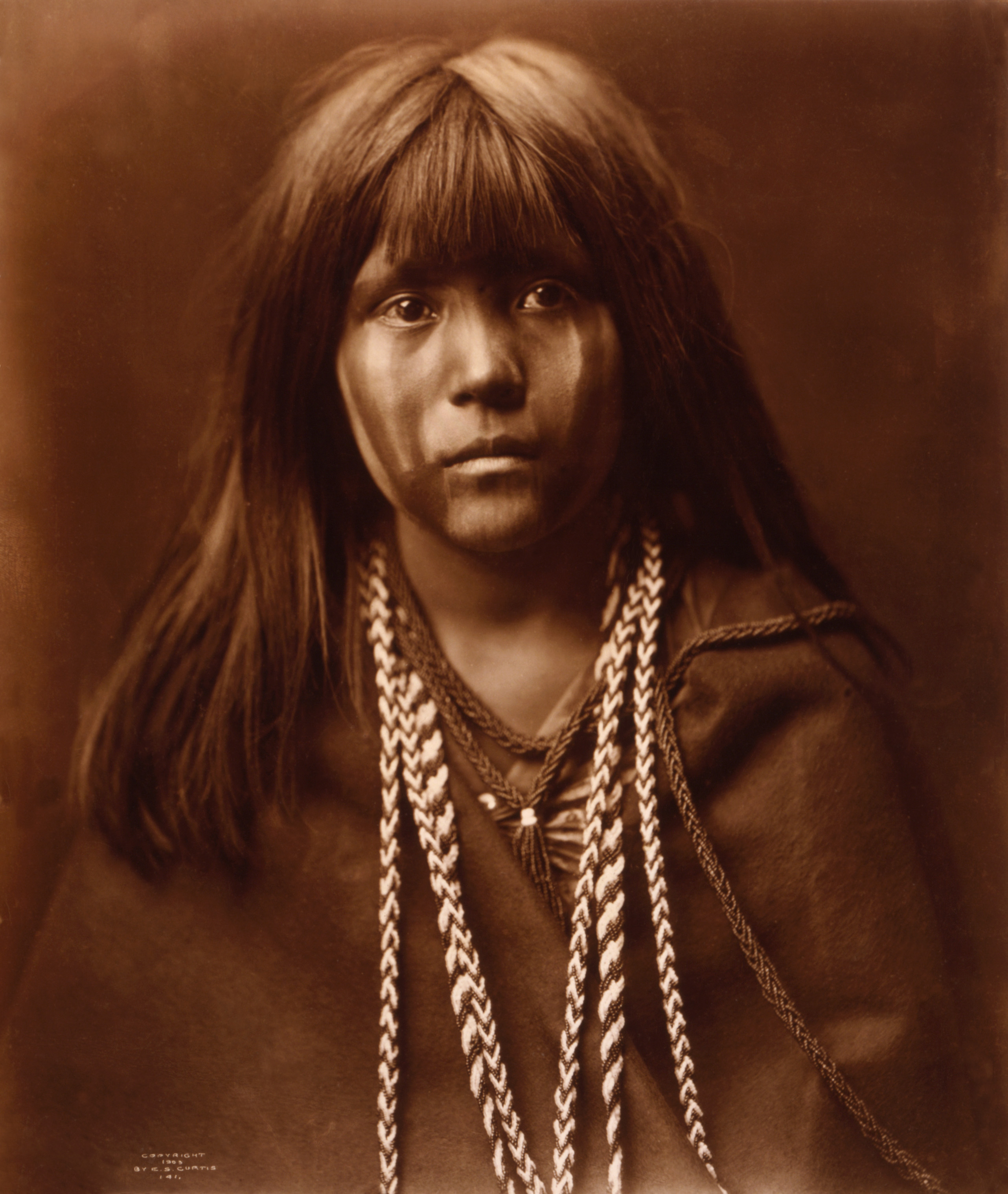
Mosa, a Mojave girl in 1903, photograph by Edward Curtis

In 1826, Jedediah Smith entered Mojave territory, followed by other European-American fur trappers in increasingly violent encounters. The United States annexed Arizona in 1850, which brought the US Army into the region.

In mid-April 1859, United States troops, led by Lieutenant Colonel William Hoffman, on the Expedition of the Colorado, moved upriver into Mojave country with the well-publicized objective of establishing a military post. By this time, white immigrants and settlers had begun to encroach on Mojave lands, and the post was intended to protect east-west European-American emigrants from attack by the Mojave. Hoffman sent couriers among the tribes, warning that the post would be gained by force if they or their allies chose to resist. During this period, several members of the Rose-Baley Party were massacred by the Mojave. The Mojave warriors withdrew as Hoffman's armada approached and the army, without conflict, occupied land near the future Fort Mojave. Hoffman ordered the Mojave men to assemble on April 23, 1859, at the armed stockade adjacent to his headquarters, to hear Hoffman' terms of peace. Hoffman gave them the choice of submission or extermination and the Mojave chose submission. At that time the Mojave population was estimated to be about 4,000, which composed 22 clans identified by totems.

Under American law the Mohave were to live on the Colorado River Reservation after its establishment in 1865. However, many refused to leave their ancestral homes in the Mojave Valley. At this time, under jurisdiction of the War Department, officials declined to try to force them onto the reservation and the Mojave in the area were relatively free to follow their tribal ways. In the midsummer of 1890, after the end of the Indian Wars, the War Department withdrew its troops and the post was transferred to the Office of Indian Affairs within the Department of the Interior.

Beginning in August 1890, the Office of Indian Affairs began an intensive program of assimilation where Mohave and other Native children living on reservations, were forced into Indian boarding schools in which they learned to speak, write, and read English. This assimilation program, which was U.S. federal policy, was based on the belief that this was the only way native peoples could survive. Fort Mojave was converted into a boarding school for local children and other "non-reservation" Indians.

=== 20th century ===
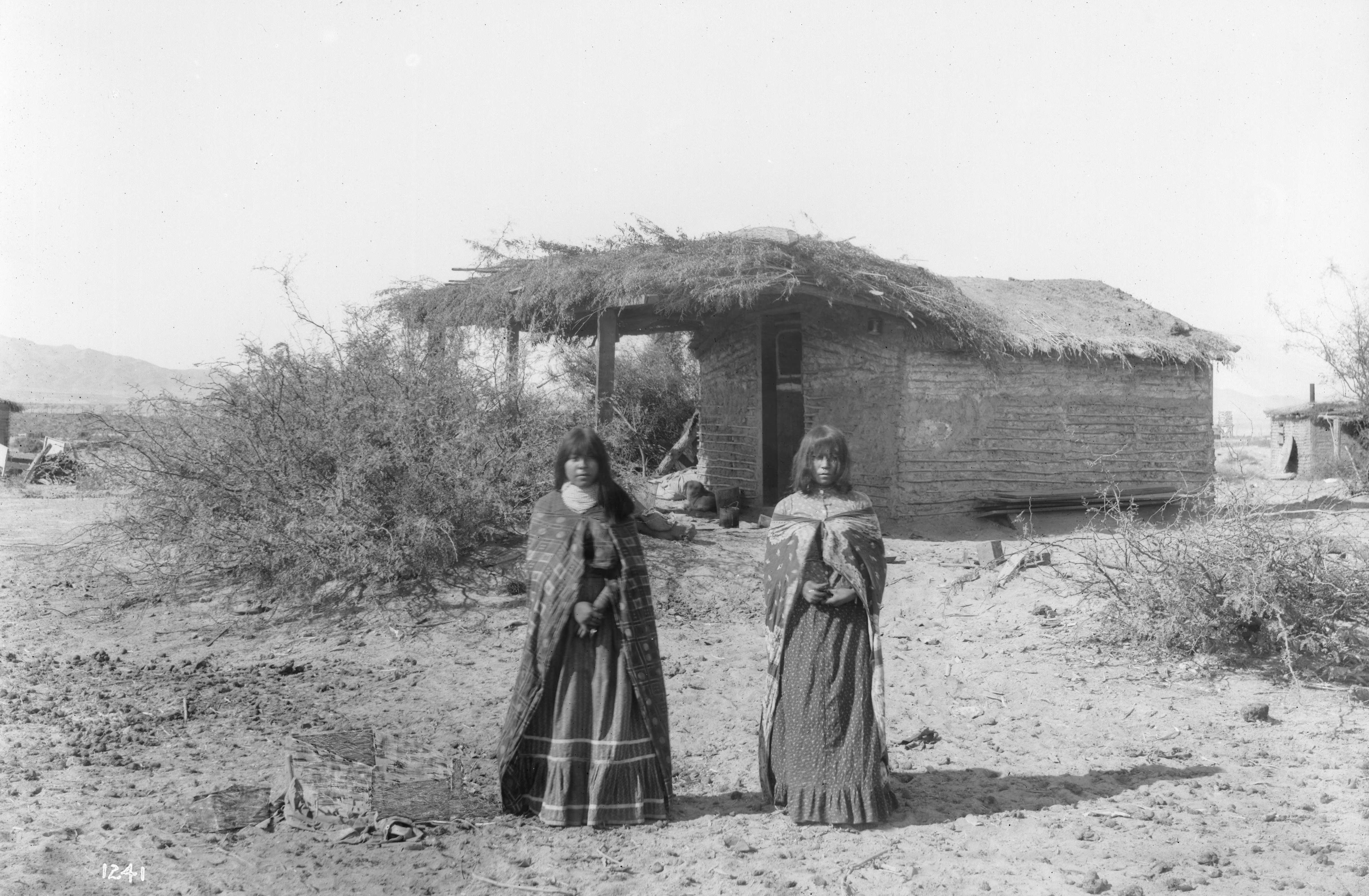
Two Mojave girls standing in front of a small dwelling with a thatched roof, 1900

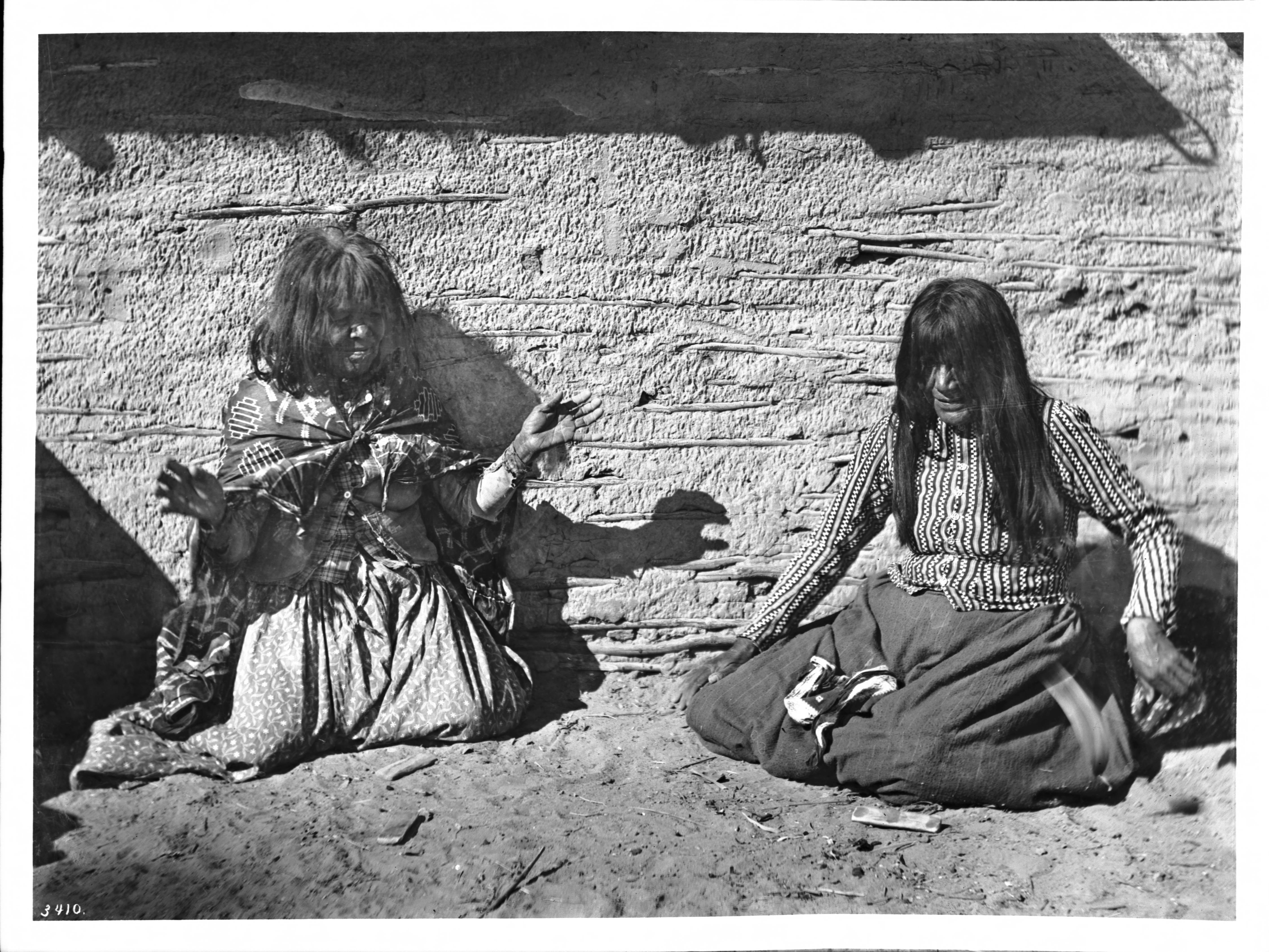
Two Mojave Indian women playing a game (fortune-telling), c. 1900

Until 1931, 41 years after its founding, all Fort Mojave boys and girls between the ages of 6 and 18 were compelled to live at the Fort Mojave Indian School or to attend other Indian boarding schools far removed from Fort Mojave.

The assimilation helped to break up tribal culture and governments. In addition to English, schools taught American culture and customs and insisted that the children follow them; students were required to adopt European-American hairstyles (which included hair cutting), clothing, habits of eating, sleeping, toiletry, manners, industry, and language. Use of their own language or customs was a punishable offense; at Fort Mojave five lashes of the whip were issued for the first offense. Such corporal punishment of children scandalized the Mojave, who did not discipline their children in that way.

Mohave children on the reservation faced aggressive tactics by school officials. One Mohave tribal chairman, Pete Homer, described his experience as a child in the early 1900s: He was about 10 years old when he and his brother were chased by white men with lassos. They were roped and tied up before being thrown in the back of a buckboard wagon. They were then taken from Parker, Arizona, to the Fort Mojave Indian school in Needles, California- about a 2-day trip. Homer noted that he didn't see his parents for a long while after his capture. When Mojave parents visited their children at school, the children were allowed only to speak English.

As part of the assimilation the administrators assigned English names to the children and registered as citizens of one of two tribes, the Mojave Tribe on the Colorado River Reservation and the Fort Mojave Indian Tribe on the Fort Mojave Indian Reservation. These divisions did not reflect the traditional Mojave clan and kinship system. In the late 1960s, 30 years after the end of the assimilation program, 18 of the 22 traditional clans still survived.

In 1957, the Fort Mojave Indian Tribe ratified its constitution.

== Population ==
Estimates of the precontact populations of most Native groups in California have varied substantially. Alfred L. Kroeber (1925:883) put the 1770 population of the Mohave at 3,000 and Francisco Garcés, a Franciscan missionary-explorer, also estimated the population at 3,000 in 1776 (Garcés 1900(2):450).

A.L. Kroeber estimate of the population in 1910 was 1,050. By 1963 Lorraine M. Sherer's research revealed the population had shrunk to approximately 988, with 438 at Fort Mojave and 550 at the Colorado River Reservation.

== Current status ==
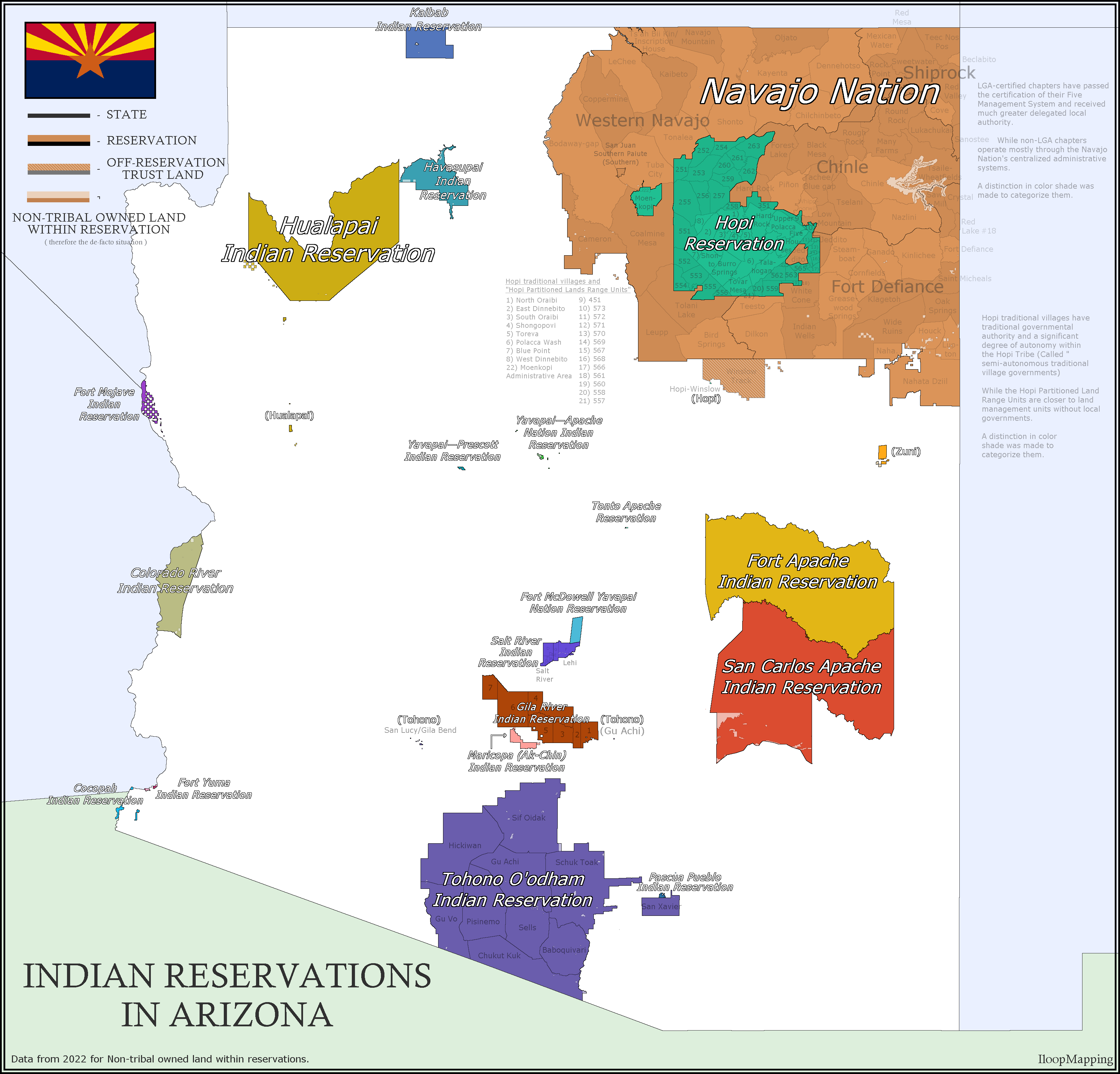
Map of the Colorado Indian River Tribes and neighboring tribes.

The Mohave, along with the Chemehuevi, some Hopi, and some Navajo, share the Colorado River Indian Reservation and function today as one geopolitical unit known as the federally recognized Colorado River Indian Tribes; each tribe also continues to maintain and observe its individual traditions, distinct religions, and culturally unique identities. The Colorado River Indian Tribes headquarters, library and museum are in Parker, Arizona, about 40 miles (64 km) north of I-10. The Colorado River Indian Tribes Native American Days Fair & Expo is held annually in Parker, from Thursday through Sunday during the first week of October. The Megathrow Traditional Bird Singing & Dancing social event is also celebrated annually, on the third weekend of March. RV facilities are available along the Colorado River.

== See also ==
- Mohave traditional narratives
- Blythe geoglyphs
- Fort Mohave, Arizona
- Bullhead City, Arizona
- Population of Native California
- Hi-wa itck, a syndrome triggered by separation from a loved one
