= Bullhead City Elementary School District =

School district in Arizona, United States

Bullhead City School District 15

Location
- 1004 Hancock Rd; Bullhead City, Arizona 86442 United States

District information
- Motto: "Where education is a journey, not a destination."
- Grades: PreK thru 8th
- Established: 1948
- Superintendent: Carolyn Stewart
- Schools: Bullhead City Middle School; Coyote Canyon School; Desert Valley School; Diamondback Elementary School; Fox Creek Junior High School; Sunrise Elementary School

Students and staff
- Students: 2500

Other information
- Website: www.bcsd15.org

Bullhead City School District #15 is a public school district based in Mohave County, Arizona. The superintendent of the Bullhead City School District #15 is Dr. Carolyn Stewart

In addition to Bullhead City, the district includes the Katherine census-designated place.

== Schools ==
Preschool and special needs:

- Coyote Canyon School

PreK/K-4 schools:

- Desert Valley School
- Diamondback Elementary School
- Sunrise Elementary School

5-6 schools:

- Bullhead City Middle School

7-8 schools:

- Fox Creek Junior High School
