= Network One =

American television network

Network One logo

Network One was a small "independent" network, consisting of mostly low-powered television stations, scattered across the Continental United States, similar to Urban America Television, America One, or the better-known Ion (formerly PAX). The network officially launched on December 1, 1993, around the same time as Channel America and the American Independent Network, but shut down on November 13, 1997.

== "Alternative" programming ==
Focusing on "alternative" programming, the network consisted of various B-Grade movies, beauty pageants, anime, and episodes of the series Night Flight and Bohemia Afterdark (a Portland, Oregon-based music video show). Classic episodes of the 1950s "hard-boiled" crime drama Lock-Up with Macdonald Carey were featured as well. Commercials were filled with advertisements for 1-900 chat lines with a more mature focus.

=== List of series and films to air on Network One ===
- Action Cinema
- Aerobicise
- The Adventures of Kit Carson
- amfAR Pajama Party
- Annie Oakley
- The Beatniks
- Bells of San Angelo
- The Big Cat
- The Big Trees
- Bodycise Bodyshaping
- Bohemia Afterdark
- Caged in Paradiso
- Cannibal Women in the Avocado Jungle of Death
- Captain Scarlett
- The Capture of Bigfoot
- Carnival Rock
- Carnival Story
- Caroline and the Rebels
- The Corpse Vanishes
- Crying Freeman
- Curse of the Blue Lights
- Curse of the Cannibal Confederates
- Date Bait
- Days of Jesse James
- Decameron Nights
- The Desert Trail
- Dialing for Dingbats
- Dishonored Lady
- The Divorce of Lady X
- Doctor Blood's Coffin
- Doomed Megalopolis
- Dr. Alien
- East Side Kids
- 8 Man After
- Ellie
- Eternally Yours
- Fanny by Gaslight
- A Farewell to Arms
- The Final Sanction
- Fishmasters
- Fishing with Larry Nixon
- Fist of the North Star
- Five Minutes to Love
- The Flying Deuces
- The Four Deuces
- Four Star Playhouse
- Future Zone
- Ginger Lynn Allen's Superbody Workout
- Great Sports Vacations
- The Green Promise
- Guest in the House
- Gung Ho!
- Gun Girls
- Happy Go Lovely
- Hell in Normandy
- Hercules Against the Moon Men
- Hercules and the Conquest of Atlantis
- Hercules Unchained
- Hollywood Chainsaw Hookers
- Hollywood High
- Iced
- Japanimation
- Jazz Alley
- Kamillions
- Kid Dynamite
- Life with Father
- Lily C.A.T.
- Linda Lovelace for President
- Lock-Up
- Look of the Year
- The Love Channel with the Poor Man
- Lupin the 3rd: The Mystery of Mamo
- Lupin III: Tales of the Wolf
- Lust for Freedom
- The Magic Sword
- Messalina vs. the Son of Hercules
- Million Dollar Kid
- Miss Jägermeister
- Mortuary
- Music on Demand
- Music Underground
- Naked Youth
- Neath Brooklyn Bridge
- Neo Tokyo
- New Music Spotlight
- Night Flight
- N1 Exposed
- A Nymphoid Barbarian in Dinosaur Hell
- One Step Beyond
- The Paris Express
- Party in Progress
- Passion and Valor
- Planet Central
- Rage at Dawn
- Requiem for a Secret Agent
- The Proud and Damned
- The Roommates
- Scared Stiff
- Scared to Death
- Science Flixion Theater
- Scream, Baby, Scream
- Screamer Cinema
- Showcase Cinema
- Silent Night, Deadly Night
- Sizzle Beach, U.S.A.
- Silent Möbius
- A Star Is Born
- State Department: File 649
- The Strange Love of Martha Ivers
- Strangest Dreams: Invasion of the Space Preachers
- The Stud
- Subterfuge
- Swamp Diamonds
- Teenage Devil Dolls
- Teenage Wolfpack
- Twilight of the Cockroaches
- Troma Theater
- Up Your Ladder
- Vampire Hunter D
- Videomaker
- When Women Had Tails
- Wicked City
- Wild Guitar
- The Wild Ride
- The Wild Women of Wongo
- Witchcraft III: The Kiss of Death
- Zillion
- Zontar, the Thing from Venus

== List of former affiliates ==
Most affiliates have since, either gone independent, switched affiliations to another television network, or have simply gone off the air. Some, however, have simply turned into rebroadcasters for other stations.

City of license	Station	Channel
Albany (New Paltz), NY	WNPC	17
Albany (Queensbury), NY	WNCE	8
Albany (Valdosta), GA	WGVP	44
Albany, GA	WBLK	35
Albuquerque, NM	KRQE+	13
Atlanta (Norcross), GA	Media 1 News	33
Atlanta (Roswell), GA	WCA	22
Austin, TX	KVC	13
Bakersfield, CA	KUZZ	45
Baltimore, MD	WMJF	61
Boston, MA	WMFP	62
Buffalo (Hornell), NY	MCTV	18
Buffalo (Olean), NY	WAB	20
Burlington, VT/Plattsburgh, NY	WWIN	39
Butte, MT	KWYB	18
Charleston, SC	WMMP	36
Charlotte, NC	WHKY	14
Charlotte, NC	WJZY+	46
Chattanooga (Dalton, GA), TN	WDNN	43
Chattanooga (Summersville), TN	AG-TV	39
Chattanooga, TN	WYHB	39
Chicago (Plano), IL	WAL / WFX	30
Chico-Redding, CA	KDQT	46
Cincinnati, OH	WAI / WBQC	25
Cleveland (Akron), OH	WAOH	29
Cleveland (Ashland), OH	WBP	59
Cleveland, OH	WAX	35
Columbus, OH	WLWG	62
Dallas-Ft. Worth, TX	KDAF	33
Dayton, OH	WUCT	51
Detroit, MI	WADL	38
Dothan, AL	WJJN	69
El Paso, TX	KJLF	65
El Paso, TX	KZIA	48
Eugene, OR	KEVU	34
Eugene, OR	KROZ	36
Evansville (Webster, KY), IN	WEBSTER	2
Florence-Myrtle Beach, SC	WEYB	56
Fort Myers, FL	WEVU	7
Fort Smith (Siloam Springs), AR	CABLE	4
Fort Wayne (Auburn), IN	W07CL	7
Fort Wayne, IN	WANE	15
Gainesville, FL	WGFL / WJXE	53 / 14
Great Falls, MT	KTGF	16
Greensboro (Reidsville), NC	WXIV / WAU	14
Hartford-New Haven, CT	WBL	6
Hartford, CT	WCG	10
Honolulu, HI	KEX	56
Houston, TX	KZJL	61
Huntsville-Decatur (Florence), AL	WBCF	3
Indianapolis, IN	WAV	53
Indianapolis, IN	WISH	8
Indianapolis, IN	WSOT	25
Jackson, MS	WBC	23
Jacksonville, FL	WCF	9
Jacksonville, FL	WJWB	17
Johnstown/Altoona, PA	WTWB	19
Joplin-Pittsburg (Carthage), MO	KKD	5
Kodiak, AK	KUE	11
Lafayette (Opelousas), LA	KDCG	22
Las Vegas (Lake Havasu, AZ), NV	KBJ	23
Little Rock, AR	K28DK	28
Little Rock, AR	KKYK	22
Los Angeles (Oxnard), CA	KTCN	24
Los Angeles (Palmdale), CA	KPAL	38
Los Angeles (Temecula/Rainbow), CA	KFMG	67
Los Angeles (Van Nuys), CA	KTVN	38
Los Angeles (Ventura), CA	KSTV	57
Louisville, KY	WBNA	21
Lubbock, TX	KJTV	34
Medford (Brookings), OR	KBSC	49
Memphis (Holly Springs, MS), TN	WBII	20
Miami, FL	WWFD	8
Minneapolis-St. Paul (Bemidji), MN	KBSU	17
Missoula, MT	KTMF	23
Mobile-Pensacola, FL	WBOP	12
Monroe, LA	KARD	14
Montgomery (Alexander City), AL	WAXC	64
Montgomery (Alexander City), AL	WETU	39
Montgomery, AL	WCOV	2
Naples, FL	WBSP	9
Nashville (Cookeville), TN	WKZX	28
Nashville (Hopkinsville, KY), TN	WKAG	43
Nashville (Murfreesboro), TN	WHRT	27
Nashville, TN	WJFB	67
New York (Kingston), NY	WRNN	62
New York (Southampton), NY	WVVH	23
Norfolk, VA	WPEN	68
Norfolk, VA (Williamsburg)	WHTV	19
Oklahoma City (Enid), OK	KDZ	32
Omaha, NE	KFM	67
Orlando, FL	WNTO	26
Ottumwa, IA	KYOU	15
Paducah (Union City), KY	WOBT	9
Philadelphia, PA	WGTW	48
Philadelphia, PA	WOCC	8
Phoenix (Flagstaff), AZ	KNAZ	2
Phoenix (Kingman), AZ	KMOH	6
Phoenix (Laughlin, NV/Bullhead), AZ	KLBC	2
Phoenix, AZ	KSAZ	10
Pittsburgh (Monroeville), PA	WBPA	29
Pittsburgh, PA	W69CC	69
Raleigh-Durham (Fayetteville), NC	WFAY	62
Raleigh-Durham (Rocky Mount), NC	WHIG	57
Rapid City, SD	KOTA+	3
Sacramento (San Leandro), CA	KFTL	64
Salt Lake City (Logan), UT	KVWB	12
Salt Lake City (St. George/Cedar City), UT	KSGI	4
Salt Lake City, UT	KCN	38
San Diego (Esconido), CA	KDM	43
San Diego, CA	KSWB	69
San Francisco, CA	KBI	38
Santa Barbara (Santa Maria/San Luis Obispo), CA	KSSY	66
Springfield, MO	KWBS	56
St. Louis, MO	American Cablevision	3
Tampa-St. Pete (Venice), FL	WBSV	62
Toledo (Findlay), OH	WFND	47
Tuscaloosa, AL	WDBB	17
Twin Falls, ID	Wireless	
Victoria, TX	K53CZ	53
West Palm Beach (Stuart), FL	WTCN	16
Waco (Bryan), TX	KYLE	28
Waco, TX	KWKT	44
Washington (Greenbelt, MD), DC	WIAV	58
Watertown, NY	WEPT	24
Webster, KY	Cable	
Wichita (Kiowa), KS	KDEN	36
Wichita Falls, TX	Vista Cablevision	
Wichita, KS	KCTU	55
Wichita, KS	KSAS+	24

Network One was also available nationwide on home satellite via Satcom C-1 transponder #11 (F1-11).

== See also ==
- America One
- American Independent Network
- Channel America
- ION Television
- Independent station
- Urban America Television

== Sources ==
- Network One on the Web Archive
