= William Harrison Hardy =

American mayor and inventor

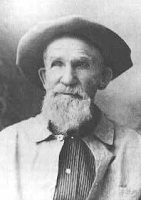
- Captain Hardy (circa. 1866)
- Born: April 15, 1823; Watertown, New York
- Died: June 1, 1906 (aged 83); Whittier, California
- Occupations: Postmaster, inventor, founder of Hardyville
- Known for: Founder of Hardyville, operator of an Colorado River Ferry, store owner

William Harrison Hardy (April 15, 1823 − June 1906) was an American politician and entrepreneur who founded the city of Hardyville, which has been replaced by Bullhead City, Arizona.

== Early life ==
William H. Hardy was born in Watertown, New York. He lived in New York for 26 or so years, where then he ventured to California on a wagon train, being labelled as Captain Hardy. He had a fortune from his earlier ventures before he arrived in California, and he purchased a Colorado River Ferry. From the help of George Alonzo Johnson's Colorado Steam Navigation Co., He began to run a ferry company, which he would occasionally give rides for free for those that were unfortunate.

== Hardyville ==
Hardyville, which is now known as Bullhead City, was a town that was named after William H. Hardy himself. Hardy was the first postmaster of the city from 1865, and was as well the inventor of the riveted mail sack, being credited for his invention. Hardyville is memorialized by Street art beside the Hardyville Cemetery, the only surviving piece of Hardyville to this day. The mural provides a illustration of William Hardy, standing beside a River filled with ferries. It was common for steamboats arriving at Hardyville to deliver supplies to the recently discovered gold mines. The town was given a seat in Mohave County in 1867, and later on, it increased in population, and there was new buildings built up, such as general stores, blacksmiths, and a city hall. The introduction of the railroad, and multiple fires, brought down Hardyville, and in the 1890s, with the mills no longer running, slowly became a ghost town.
