= BVM =

BVM may refer to:

- Blessed Virgin Mary (Latin: Beata Virgo Maria), a title for Mary, mother of Jesus
- Bachelor of Veterinary Medicine, a university degree
- Bag valve mask, a device used in resuscitation procedures to assist patients in breathing
- Birla Vishvakarma Mahavidyalaya, an engineering college in Gujarat, India
- Bohemia Visual Music, an American music video network
- Bolsa de Valores de Montevideo, the main stock exchange in Uruguay
- Sisters of Charity of the Blessed Virgin Mary, a religious order
- Broadcast video monitor, a type of professional video monitor
