= Arizona's Family Sports =

Regional sports TV channel in Arizona

- Type: Sports-focused broadcast television network
- Country: United States
- Availability: Statewide Arizona
- TV stations: See § Stations
- Owner: Gray Media
- Launch date: July 13, 1995, with the launch of K19DD (now KPHE-LD) in Phoenix
- Official website: www.azfamily.com/programming/sports-network/

Arizona's Family Sports (AZFS) is a broadcast television network in Arizona, United States. It is owned by Gray Media as a part of the Arizona's Family group of stations, based in Phoenix, alongside CBS affiliate KPHO-TV (channel 5) and independent station KTVK (channel 3). Its programming consists primarily of sports events and news simulcasts. It is broadcast by low-power station KPHE-LD (channel 44) and on a subchannel of KPHO-TV in Phoenix from transmitters atop South Mountain; in Flagstaff on KAZF (channel 32), with transmitter on Mormon Mountain; in Yuma on KAZS (channel 27), with transmitter on Black Mountain in Imperial County, California; and in Tucson as a subchannel of Gray-owned KOLD-TV.

KPHE-LD, the low-power station purchased by Gray to start Arizona's Family Sports, was on the air by the mid-1990s, originally on channel 19. It broadcast programming from several sources and was also used in a trial of wireless internet broadcasting from low-power TV stations in the early 2000s. From 2003 to 2006, the station broadcast Bohemia Visual Music, a music video service. During that time, Lotus Communications purchased the station, and it relocated to channel 44. Lotus then relaunched the station with Spanish-language programming, some of it local.

In 2022, Gray Television acquired KPHE-LD and won permits to build new full-power stations in Flagstaff and Yuma. On March 1, 2023, the Arizona's Family Sports and Entertainment Network (shortened to Arizona's Family Sports) launched on channel 44, airing simulcasts of most of KTVK–KPHO's newscasts, Phoenix Rising FC soccer, Arizona Interscholastic Association high school sports, and other programming. Gray owns the rights to Phoenix Suns and Phoenix Mercury basketball, which are aired in conjunction with KTVK and KPHO-TV, and Arizona Cardinals preseason football, which is broadcast by KPHO-TV and KOLD-TV plus Arizona's Family Sports in Yuma.

== History of KPHE-LD ==
=== Early years ===
On March 17, 1992, the Federal Communications Commission (FCC) granted an original construction permit to build low-power television station K19DD on UHF channel 19 to serve Phoenix, Arizona, and the East Valley. The station was owned by Scottsdale publisher Harlan L. Jacobsen, with transmitter location on Usery Mountain in east Mesa. K19DD was granted an initial license on July 13, 1995, and aired Bloomberg Television by 1996.

In June 1998, Jacobsen was granted a construction permit to operate an experimental broadcast station using the facilities of K19DD to broadcast in digital format. He sold the station to US Interactive LLC in September 1999; the new owners adopted the call sign KPHE-LP. In December 2000, the station became part of a pilot program to study the feasibility of using low-power UHF television stations to deliver wireless data services to subscribers. The Digital Data Services Act pilot project was effective from December 2000 through June 2002, during which time KPHE was unavailable as an over-the-air analog broadcast station.

After the pilot project was complete, KPHE programming consisted of a camera focused on a fish tank. Viewers could watch the fish while music played in the background. That changed in October 2003, when Valley residents Jeff Crawford and Jennifer Harris Crawford leased the station from US Interactive and took over its operations. The Crawfords had been operating a music video service called Bohemia AfterDark since 1982 and launched Bohemia Visual Music (BVM), a 24/7 music video channel.

=== Lotus Communications ownership ===
KPHE/Bohemia Visual Music logo used from 2005 through 2006, after the station had moved to channel 44.

In January 2004, Lotus Communications purchased KPHE from US Interactive. The sale was finalized in March, and the station continued to be operated by the Crawfords as Bohemia Visual Music. Lotus had intended to launch family-friendly Spanish-language programming, but the station continued to air Bohemia Visual Music. In March 2005, KPHE moved from channel 19 to channel 44, moved broadcast facilities from Usery Mountain to the South Mountain antenna farm, and upgraded its broadcast signal in preparation for future digital broadcasting.

In July 2006, more than a year after announcing its intention to launch a family-focused station, Lotus replaced Bohemia Visual Music programming—first with a mix of music videos, including recorded worship services, and later with talk shows and other Bible-based instruction. The new programming was branded TV Inspiración. KPHE affiliated with Monterrey-based Multimedios Televisión in November 2006 while keeping TV Inspiración as secondary programming. In February 2007, KPHE announced that it would carry Spanish-language telecasts of Arizona Diamondbacks home baseball games, beginning with the 2007 season. These were separately produced broadcasts with their own play-by-play, color commentary, and on-field announcers. 50 games a season were aired in 2007 and in 2008; original plans called for 75 games in 2009, but the team dropped the deal because KPHE was unable to secure a slot on the local Cox Communications system.

In the 2010s and early 2020s, KPHE offered a constantly changing lineup of programming, primarily in Spanish and/or religious. KPHE had converted to digital broadcasting by June 2009 and was offering four subchannels: its local channel with programming from Telemax, the state TV network of Sonora, Mexico, and Multimedios Television; the English and Spanish channels of the Seventh-day Adventist-related 3ABN network; and infomercials. Other subchannels that KPHE offered at one time or another included My Family TV and Retro TV, both owned by Luken Communications. In April 2013, the station became an affiliate of CNN Latino for eight hours a day, also continuing to air output from Telemax and local productions. Eventually, it shifted to airing mostly programming from LATV, though it was announced to air English-language coverage of Arizona Rattlers indoor football for 2021.

== Arizona's Family Sports ==
=== Acquisitions ===
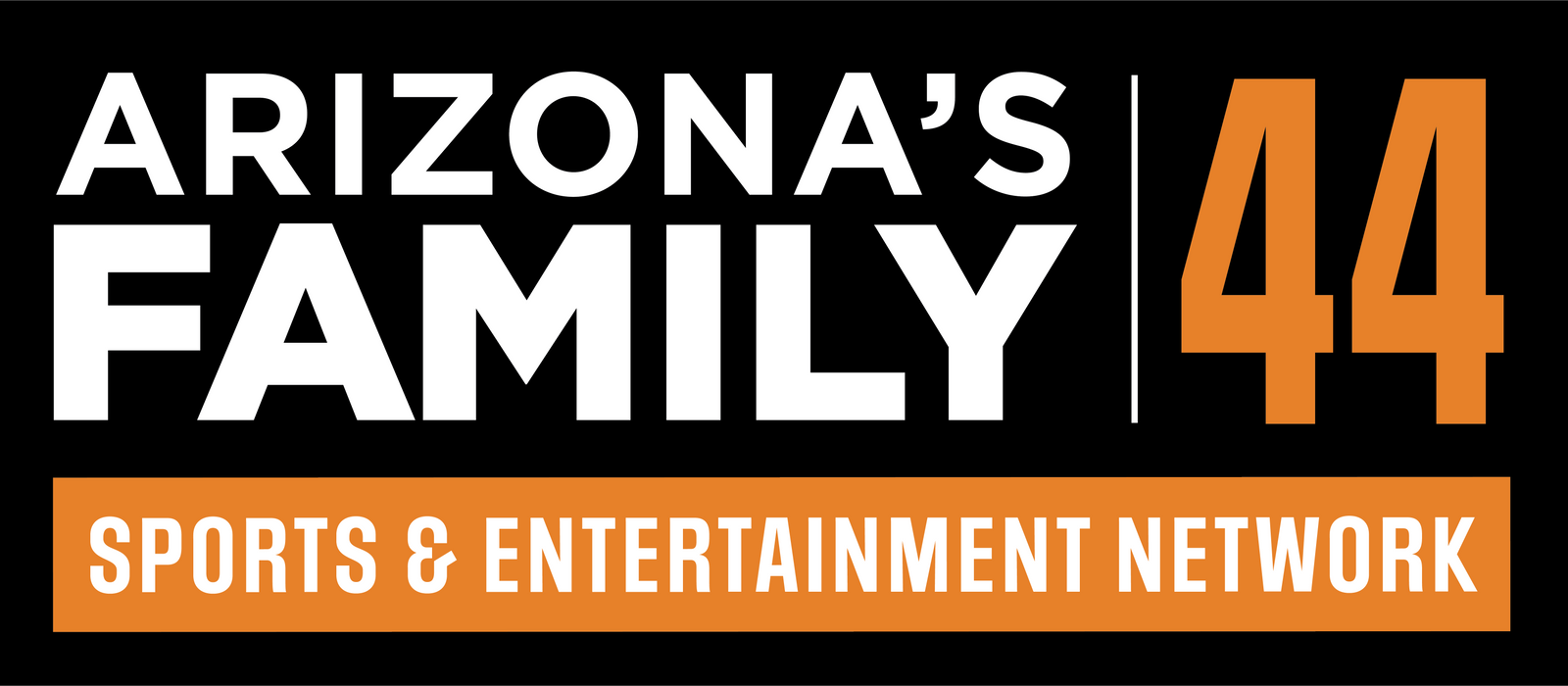
Arizona's Family Sports and Entertainment Network logo used from March 2023 to May 2023

On March 11, 2022, Gray Television (owner of CBS affiliate KPHO-TV and independent station KTVK) filed an application to acquire KPHE-LD for $1.75 million. The sale was completed on May 4. Lotus had previously reached a deal to sell to Sovryn Holdings for $2 million, which was not consummated, as part of its exit from the few low-power TV stations it still owned.

In June 2022, Gray Television participated in an FCC auction of new TV stations and paid $4.648 million for channel 32 in Flagstaff and $1.345 million for channel 11 in Yuma. The FCC approved a request from Gray Television to change the Yuma allotment from VHF channel 11 to UHF channel 27 in February 2023.

=== Launch ===
Gray announced in January 2023 that KPHE-LD would relaunch as Arizona's Family Sports and Entertainment Network (Note: The name was shortened to Arizona's Family Sports on May 19, 2023.) on March 1, 2023, drawing the name from KTVK's long time news slogan. It also announced a three-year deal with USL Championship side Phoenix Rising FC; KPHE was set to air all 34 matches per season, with five simulcasts on KTVK and one on KPHO in 2023.

On April 28, 2023, the Phoenix Suns of the NBA announced an agreement with Gray to serve as the broadcast television rightsholder of Phoenix Suns and WNBA Phoenix Mercury games, beginning in their forthcoming 2023 seasons and replacing Bally Sports Arizona. KPHE and KTVK would carry non-nationally televised games, with KTVK to carry at least 40 Suns games per season and 13 Mercury games per season; concurrently, Kiswe would develop an over-the-top (OTT) platform for the teams. The parent company of Bally Sports Arizona, Diamond Sports Group, responded by claiming that the Suns/Mercury deal represented a breach of contract by not allowing Diamond to exercise its contractual rights in violation of bankruptcy law. The CEO of the Phoenix Suns and Mercury, Josh Bartelstein, had previously cited a "goal of wide distribution" for the teams in the face of cord cutting affecting the availability of RSNs. Gray announced, in conjunction with the Suns deal, that Arizona's Family Sports and Entertainment Network would be broadcast on the 13.5 subchannel of Gray-owned KOLD-TV in Tucson. The part of the contract for Suns games was voided by the bankruptcy court under an automatic stay, while Mercury games were not affected by the court order. On July 14, the Suns announced that the Gray deal would go ahead as planned, as Diamond Sports Group declined to match the contract.

Ahead of the NBA season, the Yuma and Flagstaff stations began broadcasting. KAZS, the Yuma station, began broadcasting by September 26, 2023, while KAZF in Flagstaff debuted on the same day. Over the course of the Suns season, telecasts saw a 69-percent year-over-year ratings increase from the 2022 campaign carried by Bally Sports Arizona. Previously, the Mercury experienced a nearly sixfold ratings increase for the 2023 season, per Nielsen Media Research data.

In 2024, Gray became the official television partner of the Arizona Cardinals football team, taking over from previous rightsholder KPNX. KPHO-TV and KOLD-TV would air preseason games in addition to any Cardinals games already featured on CBS, while Arizona's Family Sports would offer additional team-related programming as well as high school football and flag football telecasts. Also in 2024, Arizona's Family Sports station would host all of the home games of the Valley Suns, the new NBA G League affiliate of the Phoenix Suns, with games announced by Arizona State University broadcaster Braiden Bell there. The Rising contract was renewed for three years in late 2025, specifying at least two games a season on KPHO, ten on KTVK, and 23 on Arizona's Family Sports.

== Stations ==
Arizona's Family Sports is broadcast on stations in three media markets: Phoenix, Tucson, and Yuma. It is also available on the Fubo streaming service in those markets plus Albuquerque, New Mexico. For further information on KPHO-TV and KOLD-TV, consult those pages.

Arizona's Family Sports primary stations
Station	City of license	Channel	FID	ERP	HAAT	Transmitter coordinates	First air date	Former call signs	Public license information
KPHE-LD	Phoenix	16 (virtual 44)	168602	15 kW	487.9 m (1,601 ft)	33°20′1″N 112°3′48″W	July 13, 1995	K19DD (1992–1999); KPHE-LP (1999–2010)	LMS
KAZF	Flagstaff	32	776273	100 kW	433.1 m (1,421 ft)	34°58′7.6″N 111°30′30.6″W	September 26, 2023	—N/a	Public file; LMS
KAZS	Yuma	27	18066	19.2 kW	433.9 m (1,424 ft)	33°3′2.1″N 114°49′40.9″W	September 26, 2023	—N/a	Public file; LMS

=== Subchannels ===
Subchannels of KPHE-LD
Subchannel		Res.	Short name	Programming
KPHE-LD	KAZF	Res.	Short name	Programming
44.1	32.1	1080i	KPHE-TV	Arizona's Family Sports
44.3	32.3	480i	Rewind	Defy
44.4	32.4	480i	Fido	Bark TV
44.5	32.5	480i	365	365BLK
44.6	32.6	480i	DRTV-1	Infomercials
44.7	32.7	480i	DRTV-2	Infomercials

Subchannels of KAZS
Subchannel	Res.	Short name	Programming
27.1	1080i	KAZS-DT	Arizona's Family Sports
27.2	480i	Outlaw	Outlaw
27.3	480i	365	365BLK
27.4	480i	Defy	Defy
