= Arizona Peace Trail =

Long-distance hiking trail in the United States

The Arizona Peace Trail is a 675 mi (1,086 km) off-highway vehicle trail loop system in Mohave, La Paz, and Yuma counties in western Arizona. It is supported by the Arizona Peace Trail Committee, which was formed in 2014, and as of early 2016, fourteen OHV clubs.

The trail system would link Bullhead City in the north and Yuma in the south with two different paths that will utilize existing dirt roads and trails. Points of interest in the trail's route include petroglyph sites and ghost towns.

The first signage for the Arizona Peace Trail was planned to be installed near Bouse on January 6, 2016. In November 2016, the Arizona State Parks board approved a $200,000 grant to fund the development of a comprehensive master plan for the trail. It is one of the longest signed and mapped OHV trail systems in the United States.
