= Jacobsen Publishing =

Organization

Jacobsen Publishing is the publisher of several monthly United States regional newspapers, based in Sioux Falls, South Dakota, and founded in 1967. Their lead publication, the Country Singles newspaper (formerly called Solo RFD), features personal ads targeted at rural residents in the Midwest and truck drivers whose routes take them through the region. The company operates a number of other small-circulation monthly newspapers including the US Farm Network newspaper, and Diabetes Cure 101.

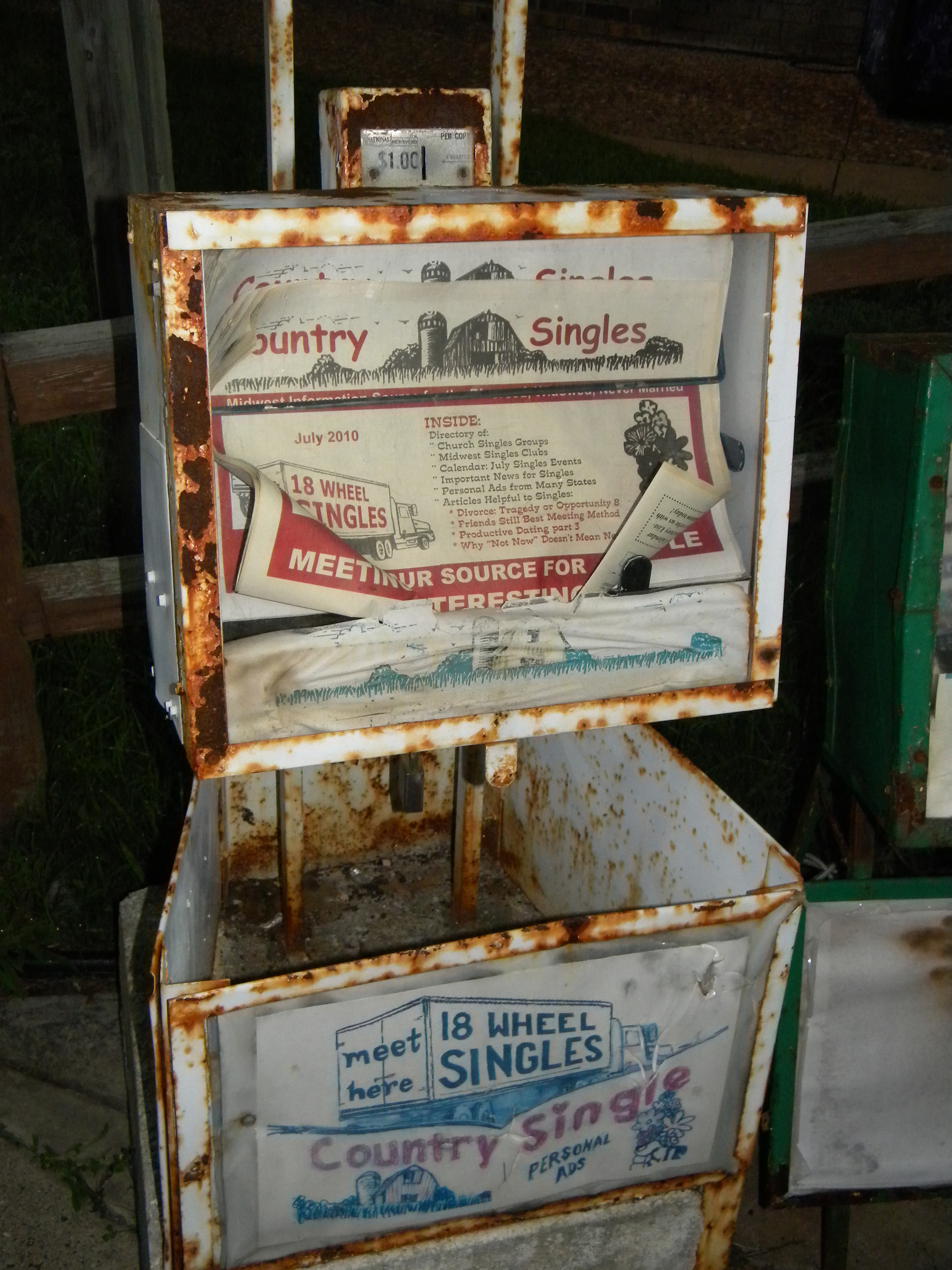
A newspaper box for the Jacobsen Publishing personals ad newspaper Country Singles, found on a public sidewalk near a rest area north of the Twin Cities

== Legal cases ==
This newspaper and its publisher are particularly notable for their involvement in several precedent-setting First Amendment legal cases defending their right to place newspaper vending machines in airports and in public spaces such as sidewalks in front of post offices and highway rest stops, in Arizona, Kansas, Iowa, Nebraska, North Dakota and South Dakota. Collectively, these cases have helped define the limits on one of the three types of public fora defined by the Supreme Court – the public forum created by government designation - building on the precedents set by Supreme Court case Cornelius v. NAACP Legal Def. & Educ. Fund.

A 1992 decision in the case Harlan Jacobsen v. United States Postal Service clarified the rights of newspapers to sell from news stands on public property (i.e. city sidewalks) while limiting their sale on Federal property (on post office grounds).

In 1997, Jacobsen won a U.S. Court of Appeals case (109 F.3d 1268) against the State of South Dakota after Department of Transportation contractors removed newspaper stands from rest stops in that state (2). The essence of this case is found in the Second Circuit Court decision, stating that “Public property ... which is neither a traditional nor a designated public forum, can still serve as a forum for First Amendment expression if the expression is appropriate for the property and is not incompatible with the normal activity of a particular place at a particular time.”

However, in a separate case in 1997, Harlan Jacobsen v. City of Rapid City, the U.S. Court of Appeals determined that the same freedom of speech rights were not applicable to airports as they were a “non public forum” and the “city's ban on commercial newsracks was not unconstitutional in light of… a legitimate revenue interest in operating the airport.”

== Other businesses ==
In addition to newspapers, Jacobsen Publishing operates several other businesses, including Video Mania, a video store in Sioux Falls, South Dakota, and a vacation home rental business in Arizona. Until 1999, the company owned a network of low-power television stations including K19DD in Phoenix, Arizona. Jacobsen Publishing has seven employees. It is owned by Harlan L. Jacobsen; his daughter Janet Jacobsen is editor of all publications.

== Online presence ==
Jacobsen Publishing also operates over 65 websites. Besides sites for their various businesses, Jacobsen manages dozens of generic websites with editorials, reprinted information and Google ads. These sites include a medical advice website, sites about curing diabetes and numerous directory sites with lists of online resources, such as live webcams or online maps.
