= Sun Valley Airport (Arizona) =

Airport in Mohave County, Arizona

- IATA: none; ICAO: none; FAA LID: A20

Summary
- Airport type: Public
- Owner: Corrigan Nav Strat LLC & PTR LLC
- Serves: Bullhead City, Arizona
- Elevation AMSL: 725 ft / 221 m
- Coordinates: 35°00′20″N 114°33′54″W
- Website: BullheadCityAirport.com

Map

Runways
Direction	Length		Surface
Direction	ft	m	Surface
18/36	3,700	1,128	Asphalt

Statistics (2007)
- Aircraft operations: 14,400
- Based aircraft: 22
- Source: Federal Aviation Administration

Sun Valley Airport (FAA LID: A20) is a privately owned public-use airport and residential airpark located 7 miles (6.1 nmi; 11 km) south of the central business district of Bullhead City, in Mohave County, Arizona, United States.

== Facilities and aircraft ==
Sun Valley Airport covers an area of 100 acres (40 ha) which contains one asphalt paved runway (18/36) measuring 3,700 x 42 ft (1,128 x 13 m). For the 12-month period ending May 2, 2007, the airport had 14,400 general aviation aircraft operations, an average of 39 per day. At that time there were 22 aircraft based at this airport: 91% single-engine and 9% multi-engine.

== See also ==
- List of airports in Arizona
