= Mohave Accelerated Learning Center =

Coordinates: 35.101007°N 114.625564°W

Location
- 625 Marina Blvd. Bullhead City, Arizona 86442; United States

Information
- Opened: 2001 (25 years ago)
- Superintendent: Casey Mulligan
- CEEB code: 030066
- Principal: Valorie Merrigan
- Enrollment: 1600-1750 students (grades Pre K-12)
- Colors: Red, white, and blue
- Slogan: make it a great day Patriots, the choice is yours
- Athletics conference: CAA
- Mascot: Patriots
- Website: www.mohavelearning.org

Mohave Accelerated Learning Center (MALC) is a charter school located in Bullhead City, Arizona. The school opened in 2001. The school serves students in grades K-12.

== Academic program ==
=== Curriculum ===
MALC offers a curriculum that includes core academic subjects such as English, mathematics, science, and social studies. The school also provides a variety of elective courses in areas such as:

- Fine Arts
- Technology
- Physical Education
- Foreign Languages

=== Advanced Placement (AP) and dual enrollment ===
To cater to students seeking advanced academic opportunities, MALC offers Advanced Placement (AP) courses and dual enrollment programs. These programs allow students to earn college credits while still in high school.

=== Special programs ===
The school provides career and technical education (CTE) programs, which offer practical skills and knowledge in various fields. Additionally, the school offers extracurricular activities, including clubs and sports, to support students' personal and social development.

== Student life ==
=== Extracurricular activities ===
MALC encourages students to participate in extracurricular activities to enhance their overall educational experience. The school offers various clubs, organizations, and sports teams, allowing students to explore their interests and develop new skills.

== Facilities ==
The school has classrooms designed for interactive learning, science labs, a library, computer labs, and spaces for arts and athletics.
