= Eagle Airpark =

Airport in Mohave County, Arizona

- IATA: none; ICAO: none; FAA LID: 0AZ9

Summary
- Airport type: Public
- Owner: Kevin Green
- Serves: Bullhead City, Arizona
- Elevation AMSL: 485 ft (148 m)
- Coordinates: 34°53′17″N 114°36′59″W

Map
- Location within Arizona Location within the United States

Runways
Direction	Length		Surface
Direction	ft	m	Surface
17/35	4,800	1,463	Asphalt

Statistics (2010)
- Aircraft operations: 16,000
- Based aircraft: 47
- Source: Federal Aviation Administration

Eagle Airpark (FAA LID: 0AZ9) is a privately owned, private-use airport in Mohave County, Arizona, United States. It is located 14 miles (12 nmi; 23 km) south of the central business district of Bullhead City.

== Facilities and aircraft ==
Eagle Airpark covers an area of 40 acres (16 ha) at an elevation of 485 feet (148 m) above mean sea level. It has one runway designated 17/35 with an Asphalt surface measuring 4,800 by 50 feet (1,463 by 15 m).

For the 12-month period ending April 23, 2010, the airport had 16,000 general aviation aircraft operations, an average of 43 per day. At that time there were 47 aircraft based at this airport: 91.5% single-engine, 6.4% multi-engine and 2.1% jet.

As of the ending of March, 2020, the airport had 190 airplane aircraft operations, an average of 1 per every other day. At that time there were 8 aircraft were based at this airport.

== See also ==
- List of airports in Arizona
