= Bullhead City, Arizona =

City in Mohave County, Arizona

- City
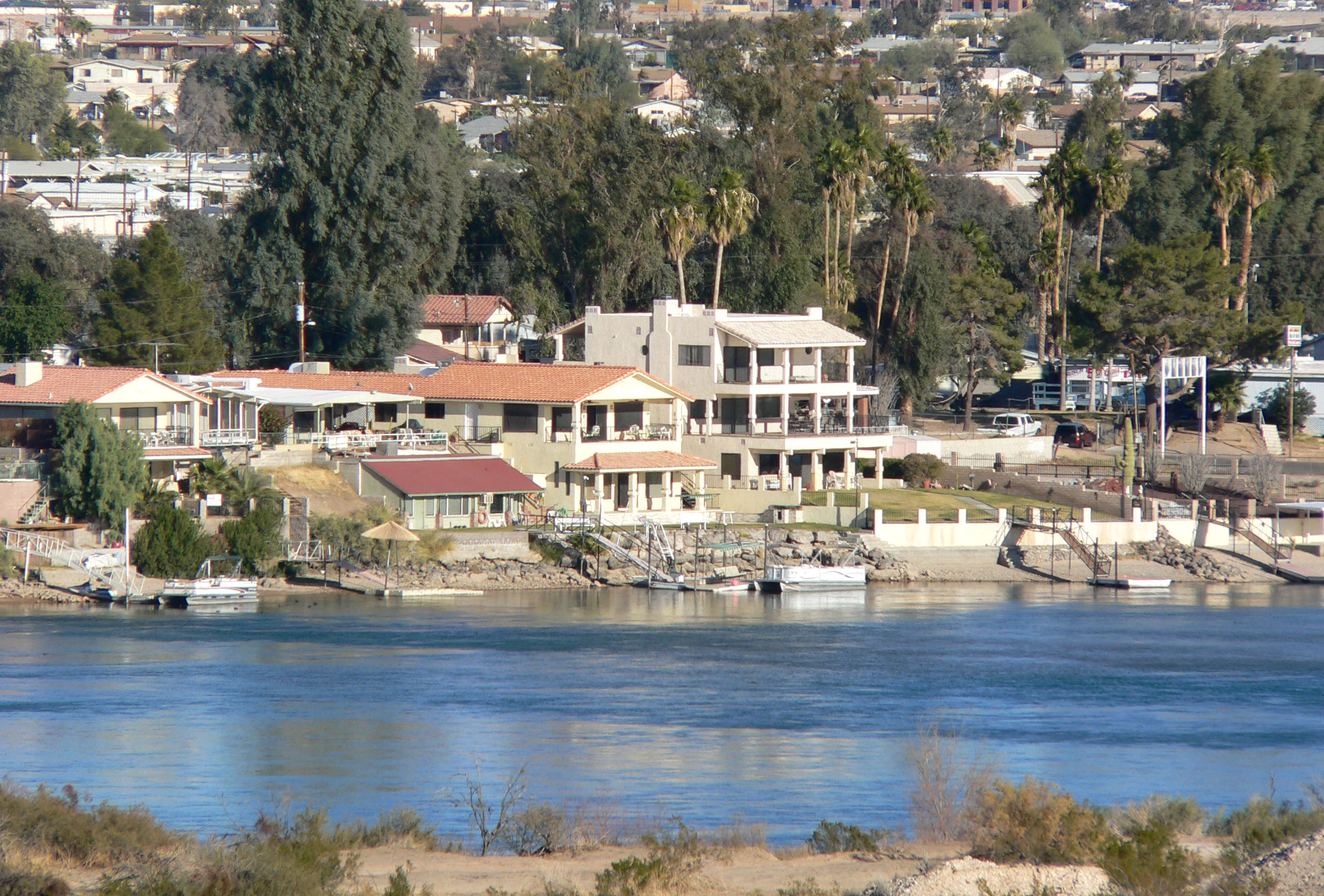
- View of Bullhead City with the Colorado River in the foreground

- Seal
- Nickname: Arizona's West Coast
- Location in Mohave County, Arizona

- Location within Arizona Location within the United States
- Coordinates: 35°6′56″N 114°35′19″W
- Country: United States
- State: Arizona
- County: Mohave
- Incorporated: 1984

Government
  - Type: Council-Manager
  - Mayor: Karen Dallman
  - Vice Mayor: Dan Alfonzo
  - City Council: Jason Newlin; Eugene O'Neil; Tami Ring; Pamela Smith

Area
  - Total: 60.15 sq mi (155.79 km^{2})
  - Land: 59.37 sq mi (153.77 km^{2})
  - Water: 0.78 sq mi (2.02 km^{2})
- Elevation: 925 ft (282 m)

Population (2020)
  - Total: 41,348
  - Density: 696.4/sq mi (268.89/km^{2})
- Time zone: UTC-7 (MST Arizona Time (no DST))
- Area code: 928
- FIPS code: 04-08220
- GNIS feature ID: 2409936
- Website: Official site

Bullhead City is a city located on the Colorado River in Mohave County, Arizona, United States, 97 miles (156 km) south of Las Vegas, Nevada, and directly across the Colorado River from Laughlin, Nevada, whose casinos and ancillary services supply much of the employment for Bullhead City. Bullhead City is located at the southern end of Lake Mohave.

As of the 2020 census, the population of Bullhead City was 41,348. The nearby communities of Laughlin, Needles, Fort Mohave and Mohave Valley bring the Bullhead area's total population to over 77,000, making it the largest economic region in Mohave County.

With over 60 square miles (160 km^{2}), Bullhead City is the largest city in Mohave County in terms of total land area.

== History ==
The earliest inhabitants of the Colorado River Valley were the Mojave people. The rich soil and plentiful water provided the valley's natives with the necessities to create a prosperous farming community. According to Mojave legend, life began on Spirit Mountain, the highest peak visible from the Bullhead City area.

The first account of European contact was with Spanish explorer Melchor Díaz, who in 1540 documented his travels in what is now northwestern Mohave County. He recounts meeting a large population of natives who referred to themselves as the Pipa Aha Macav, meaning "People by the River". From "Aha Macav" came the shortened name "Mojave" (also spelled "Mohave"). While Mohave County uses the modern English spelling, the tribe retains the traditional Spanish spelling "Mojave". Both are correct, and both are pronounced "Moh-hah-vee".

Father Francisco Garces, a Franciscan missionary and explorer, crossed the Colorado River in the Bullhead City area in 1774.

=== Hardyville ===
In March 1864, the current site of Bullhead City was the location of a settlement called "Hardyville". It was named for early resident and politician William Harrison Hardy. A New York native and an entrepreneur, Hardy established, with the support of George Alonzo Johnson's steamboat company, a ferry service and steamboat landing where the Mojave Road crossed the Colorado River. He also built and owned the Hardyville–Prescott Road, a toll road from Hardyville to the new Arizona territorial capital of Prescott, and raised Angora goats. He was a colorful and somewhat controversial figure. He was the town's first postmaster from January 17, 1865, and is credited with the invention of the riveted mail sack. He was also a Mohave County supervisor and a member of the Arizona Territorial Legislature. In 1864 his personal worth was over $40,000, making him the second-richest man in Arizona.

From 1864 to 1883, steamboats made regular trips up the Colorado River from Port Isabel in Mexico and, after the arrival of the railroad from Yuma, Arizona, stopping at Hardyville regularly to deliver supplies to the mines of the surrounding mining districts and those to the east in the interior of Arizona and carry out their ore for processing and sale. These stern-wheeler riverboats played an important part in the early development of the areas bordering the Colorado River, and Hardyville was considered the low water limit of navigation for the steamboats. Steamboat travel above that point to places in like El Dorado Canyon, Callville and later Rioville was possible only during the few months of the late spring to early summer flood caused by snowmelt in the upper Colorado River watershed. Hardyville was the starting point for wagon roads and pack trails to the mines and other settlements in the upper region of the river. It was also the port for flatboats that ascended the river as far as Callville in the extreme low water time of the year.

In April 1866, Brevet Brigadier General James Fowler Rusling visited the settlement and described it:

Hardyville itself was then more of a name than place, consisting chiefly of a warehouse and quartz-mill, with a few adobe shanties. Near Hardyville, some ten or twenty miles away in the outlying mountains, there were several mines—gold, silver and copper—of more or less richness, and the mill was located here to take advantage of the two great essentials, wood and water. The mill, however, was standing idle, like most enterprises in Arizona, and but little was doing in the mines.

Hardyville received a boost in 1867, when it became the county seat of Mohave County and the mills at Eldorado Canyon began operating, stimulating trade up river again. Hardyville had a population of 20 in 1870. The 1870s saw a population boom in Hardyville as mining became more profitable. With the end of hostilities with the Native Americans in Mohave County, mines in the interior boomed again, and the small town later grew with the construction of a general store, a saloon, a blacksmith shop, a billiard hall, and a respectable public hall.

However, in 1873, the county seat was moved to the mining boomtown of Cerbat. In 1877, the Southern Pacific Railroad arrived at Yuma. It bought out Johnson's Colorado Steam Navigation Company, and by 1878 had built rails into Maricopaville, resulting in wagon traffic moving to that railhead that was closer to the mines in the northern interior than Hardyville. Traffic on the road to the interior mines of the east from Hardyville waned except for that to Cerbat, Mineral Park, and Chloride. In May 1881, Issac Polhamus, captain of one of the Southern Pacific-owned Colorado Steam Navigation Company steamboats, went into competition with Hardy for the trade to those mines, establishing Polhamus Landing, a rival landing five miles up river, closer to the mines, taking away most of its river trade. Worse yet, the construction of the Atlantic and Pacific Railroad to its bridge crossing on the Colorado River near Needles, in May 1883, saw the remaining interior mining trade move away from the Colorado River and Hardyville. The Hardyville post office was discontinued in favor of the one in Mohave City on February 19, 1883. As the silver price declined in the late 1880s and early 1890s, the Hardyville mill, its only remaining economic resource, became idle and the remaining population of the town left, leaving it to become a ghost town. Hardyville still appears with that name on a September 1911 reprint of a U.S. Geological Survey Reconnaissance Map, Arizona, Nevada, California, Camp Mohave Sheet, Edition of March 1892.

Hardyville Pioneer Cemetery, a small cemetery, now a historic landmark at 35°7′16″N 114°35′17″W, is the most significant existing remnant of Hardyville. An unofficial historical marker for the town is in the parking lot across Highway 95 from the cemetery at 35°7′16″N 114°35′17″W. The Hardyville Mill ruins appeared on a USGS topographic map, at 35°7′14″N 114°34′47″W.

=== Bullhead City ===
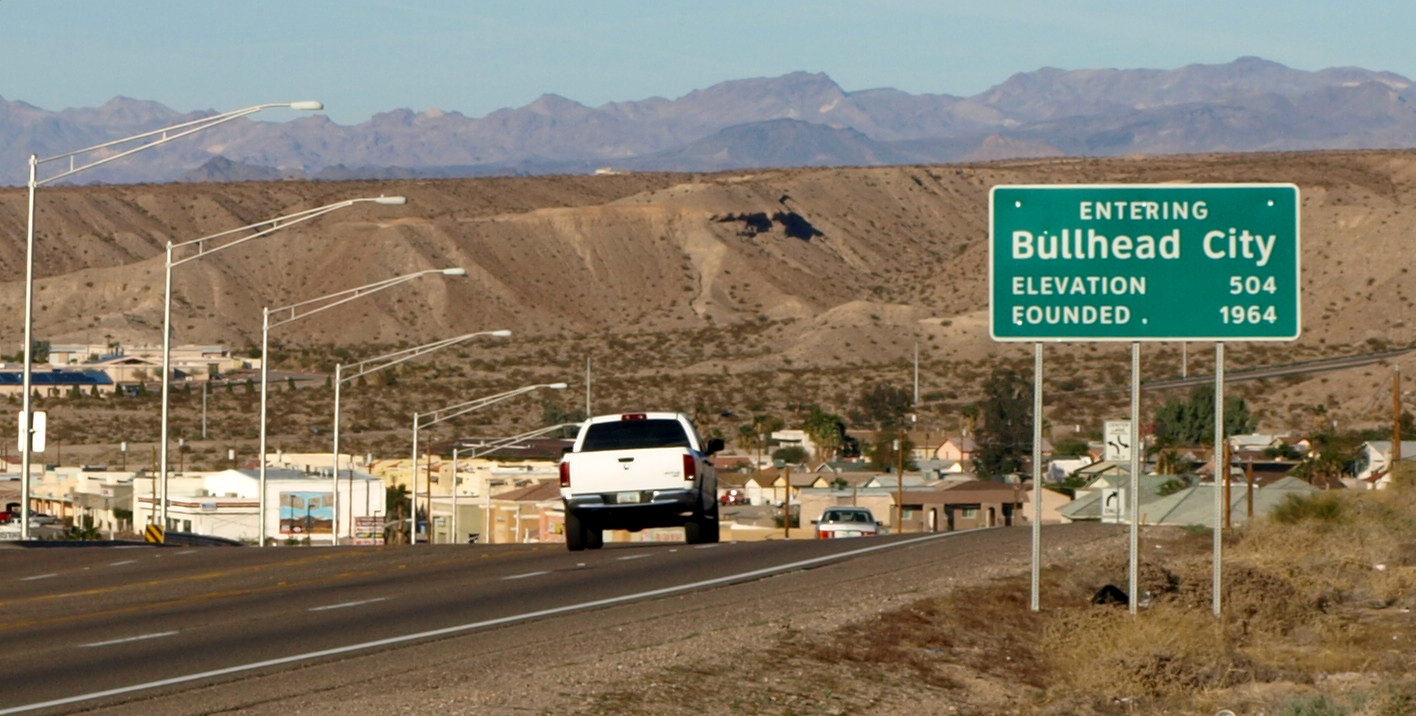
Bullhead City's southern city limits as seen from SR 95

Decades later, Hardyville would be resurrected as Bullhead City with the construction of Davis Dam between 1942 and 1953. The dam was originally called Bullhead Dam after "Bull's Head Rock", a well-known rock formation along the Colorado River. Steamboats on the river used the rock as a navigation point. After the construction of Davis Dam, the water level rose and now almost completely covers the landmark. The community that arose during the construction of Bullhead Dam was nicknamed Bullhead. Bullhead City became the headquarters for the construction project, which was completed in 1953. Thus the name Bullhead City was born. As the nearby Lake Mohave developed into a major tourism destination, and as the casino and resort town of Laughlin, Nevada, sprouted up across the river, Bullhead City grew rapidly.

In 1970, Bullhead City was the name of the six blocks that ran north–south along Highway 95 across the river from Don Laughlin's casino. About a thousand people lived in the original Bullhead City at that time, with about 3,000 people in Riviera. In 1984, the small communities of Bullhead City, Riviera, and Holiday Shores voted to incorporate, choosing the name "Bullhead City" for its historical significance.

Bullhead City and the neighboring town of Laughlin, Nevada, have grown in popularity as tourist destinations, and so has the population. Today, tourism is by far the main economy in Bullhead City. In the summer months, tourists from all over come for water recreation on Lake Mohave and the Colorado River. Starting in the fall, tourists from colder states flock by the thousands in their motor homes because of the mild winters.

== Geography ==
Bullhead City is in western Mohave County on the east side of the Colorado River, which forms the Arizona–Nevada state line. It is 34 miles (55 km) west of Kingman, the Mohave county seat, 22 miles (35 km) north of Needles, California, 97 miles (156 km) south of Las Vegas, Nevada, and 216 miles (348 km) northwest of Phoenix. According to the United States Census Bureau, Bullhead City has a total area of 60.2 square miles (156 km^{2}), of which 59.4 sq mi (154 km^{2}) are land and 0.8 sq mi (2.1 km^{2}), or 1.30%, are water.

== Demographics ==
Historical population
Census	Pop.	Note	%±
1980	10,364		—
1990	21,951		111.8%
2000	33,769		53.8%
2010	39,540		17.1%
2020	41,348		4.6%
U.S. Decennial Census

Bullhead City first appeared on the 1980 U.S. Census as the census-designated place (CDP) of Bullhead City-Riviera. It incorporated in 1984 as Bullhead City and has appeared on every successive census.

Bullhead City and the neighboring communities of Laughlin, Nevada, Fort Mohave, Mohave Valley, Arizona, and Needles, California, make up what is referred to as the "Tri-State Area". This is an economically interdependent group of communities, all geographically connected within a 10-mile (16 km) radius. The population of the tri-state area, including Bullhead City, is about 100,000. The catchment area of Laughlin/Bullhead International Airport, according to its own statistics, includes 110,000 residents.

=== Racial and ethnic composition ===
Bullhead City, Arizona – Racial composition Note: the US Census treats Hispanic/Latino as an ethnic category. This table excludes Latinos from the racial categories and assigns them to a separate category. Hispanics/Latinos may be of any race.
Race (NH = Non-Hispanic)	2020	2010	2000	1990	1980
White alone (NH)	67.8% (28,030)	71.1% (28,127)	75.4% (25,464)	91.5% (20,096)	95.6% (9,904)
Black alone (NH)	1.3% (542)	1.2% (466)	0.9% (317)	0.5% (115)	0% (0)
American Indian alone (NH)	0.8% (346)	0.8% (302)	1% (328)	0.7% (149)	0.7% (76)
Asian alone (NH)	1.4% (585)	1.3% (529)	0.9% (313)	0.7% (149)	0.4% (39)
Pacific Islander alone (NH)	0.2% (78)	0.1% (55)	0.1% (22)		
Other race alone (NH)	0.3% (141)	0.1% (45)	0.1% (24)	0.1% (16)	0% (0)
Multiracial (NH)	4.3% (1,778)	1.6% (630)	1.5% (494)	—	—
Hispanic/Latino (any race)	23.8% (9,848)	23.7% (9,386)	20.2% (6,807)	6.5% (1,426)	3.3% (345)

=== 2020 census ===
As of the 2020 census, Bullhead City had a population of 41,348. The median age was 55.5 years. 15.7% of residents were under the age of 18 and 32.7% of residents were 65 years of age or older. For every 100 females there were 98.1 males, and for every 100 females age 18 and over there were 97.2 males age 18 and over.

93.6% of residents lived in urban areas, while 6.4% lived in rural areas.

There were 18,618 households in Bullhead City, of which 18.7% had children under the age of 18 living in them. Of all households, 40.2% were married-couple households, 23.1% were households with a male householder and no spouse or partner present, and 27.2% were households with a female householder and no spouse or partner present. About 32.7% of all households were made up of individuals and 18.7% had someone living alone who was 65 years of age or older.

There were 24,503 housing units, of which 24.0% were vacant. The homeowner vacancy rate was 2.9% and the rental vacancy rate was 9.7%.

Racial composition as of the 2020 census
Race	Number	Percent
White	30,451	73.6%
Black or African American	572	1.4%
American Indian and Alaska Native	598	1.4%
Asian	612	1.5%
Native Hawaiian and Other Pacific Islander	87	0.2%
Some other race	4,146	10.0%
Two or more races	4,882	11.8%
Hispanic or Latino (of any race)	9,848	23.8%

=== 2010 census ===
As of the census of 2010, there were 39,540 people, 16,761 households, and 7,472 families. The population density was 665.9 inhabitants per square mile (257.1/km^{2}), and was divided as 50.9% male and 49.1% female. There were 23,464 total housing units.

The racial makeup of the city was 81.9% White, 1.3% Black, 1.1% Native American, 1.4% Asian, 0.1% Pacific Islander, 11.2% from other races, and 3.0% from two or more races. 23.7% of the population were Hispanic.

The median income for a household in the city was $37,492, and the median income for a family was $45,269. The per capita income for the city was $21,366. About 14.1% of families and 20.5% of the population were below the poverty line, including 40.2% of those under age 18 and 5.4% of those age 65 or over. (All figures in 2013 inflation-adjusted dollars.)

=== 2000 census ===
As of the census of 2000, there were 33,769 people, 13,909 households, and 9,110 families residing in the city. The population density was 746.6 inhabitants per square mile (288.3/km^{2}). There were 18,430 housing units at an average density of 407.5 per square mile (157.3/km^{2}). The racial makeup of the city was 85.6% White, 1.0% Black, 1.3% Native American, 1.0% Asian, 0.1% Pacific Islander, 8.3% from other races, and 2.8% from two or more races. 20.2% of the population were Hispanic.

There were 13,909 households, out of which 24.7% had children under the age of 18 living with them, 49.1% were married couples living together, 11.1% had a female householder with no husband present, and 34.5% were non-families. 25.3% of all households were made up of individuals, and 11.2% had someone living alone who was 65 years of age or older. The average household size was 2.42 and the average family size was 2.86.

In the city, the population was spread out, with 22.5% under the age of 18, 7.3% from 18 to 24, 24.5% from 25 to 44, 26.6% from 45 to 64, and 19.2% who were 65 years of age or older. The median age was 42 years. For every 100 females, there were 98.6 males. For every 100 females age 18 and over, there were 96.2 males.

The median income for a household in the city was $30,221, and the median income for a family was $33,914. Males had a median income of $23,617 versus $19,564 for females. The per capita income for the city was $16,250. About 11.3% of families and 15.1% of the population were below the poverty line, including 23.2% of those under age 18 and 6.9% of those age 65 or over.

== Climate ==
Bullhead City has a desert climate (Köppen climate classification BWh), with several inches of precipitation year-round. The last year with recorded snowfall was 2014, but no snow depth has been recorded.

Summers are very hot, with temperatures frequently exceeding 100 °F (38 °C) in July and August, and winters are mild with days typically seeing temperatures between 65–75 °F (18–24 °C) degrees in January and February. It is one of the hottest cities nationwide during the summer. There are on average 185 days with a high reaching 90 °F (32 °C), and 100 °F (38 °C) can be seen on 135 days. Heat waves involving temperatures reaching over 120 °F (49 °C) are not unusual.

Climate data for Bullhead City, Arizona, 1991–2020 normals, extremes 1977–present
Month	Jan	Feb	Mar	Apr	May	Jun	Jul	Aug	Sep	Oct	Nov	Dec	Year
Record high °F (°C)	83 (28)	93 (34)	104 (40)	107 (42)	118 (48)	126 (52)	124 (51)	122 (50)	117 (47)	111 (44)	95 (35)	88 (31)	126 (52)
Mean daily maximum °F (°C)	65.0 (18.3)	69.8 (21.0)	78.6 (25.9)	87.4 (30.8)	96.3 (35.7)	106.7 (41.5)	110.7 (43.7)	109.3 (42.9)	102.7 (39.3)	89.4 (31.9)	74.2 (23.4)	63.6 (17.6)	87.8 (31.0)
Daily mean °F (°C)	54.9 (12.7)	58.2 (14.6)	64.6 (18.1)	72.0 (22.2)	81.1 (27.3)	90.0 (32.2)	95.9 (35.5)	95.1 (35.1)	87.6 (30.9)	75.3 (24.1)	62.4 (16.9)	53.7 (12.1)	74.2 (23.5)
Mean daily minimum °F (°C)	44.8 (7.1)	46.6 (8.1)	50.6 (10.3)	56.7 (13.7)	65.8 (18.8)	73.3 (22.9)	81.1 (27.3)	80.8 (27.1)	72.6 (22.6)	61.2 (16.2)	50.5 (10.3)	43.9 (6.6)	60.7 (15.9)
Record low °F (°C)	25 (−4)	28 (−2)	28 (−2)	40 (4)	47 (8)	50 (10)	64 (18)	60 (16)	54 (12)	37 (3)	30 (−1)	23 (−5)	23 (−5)
Average precipitation inches (mm)	1.01 (26)	1.15 (29)	0.76 (19)	0.14 (3.6)	0.08 (2.0)	0.01 (0.25)	0.23 (5.8)	0.48 (12)	0.18 (4.6)	0.50 (13)	0.39 (9.9)	0.47 (12)	5.40 (137)
Source: NOAA

== Parks and recreation ==
Bullhead City has hundreds of acres of city-operated parks. Ken Fovargue Park features lighted basketball courts, a bike trail, ball fields, a playground, and a public swimming pool with a water slide. Rotary Park', the largest city park, covers 300 acres (1.2 km^{2}) of riverfront land. It features maintained beaches with ramadas and barbecues, a large skate park, fishing jetty, fish cleaning station, boat launching ramps, a dog park, a disc golf course, and a complete lighted sports complex that hosts regional tournaments and local competitions. The proposed Arizona Peace Trail would serve Bullhead City.

=== Controversy ===
Feeding homeless people in parks is not permitted in Bullhead City. In March 2022, in an incident described internationally as “criminalizing kindness”, 78-year-old local resident Norma Thornton was arrested and accused of violating an ordinance against sharing food for "charitable purposes" at public parks. The charges were later dropped in July, but the Arizona grandmother said she was warned that if she began sharing food in the park again, she would go to jail.

=== Special events and sports tournaments ===
Bullhead City hosts many annual events, the most notable being a river regatta. On the weekend of August 13, 2016, the 10th annual Bullhead City River Regatta, with a Pirates of the Colorado theme, attracted 30,158 registered participants. The local economic impact of the event was estimated at $20 million in 2015, although the city made just $208,000.

Other events take advantage of Bullhead City's climate in the fall and winter months, in particular sports tournaments. Every February, A.Y.S.O. Region 397 hosts the annual Colorado River Invitational Tournament at Rotary Park. The annual youth soccer tournament draws thousands of young soccer players and their supporters. Bullhead City also sponsors two senior softball tournaments every year, one in the spring and one in the fall. Participants come from as far away as Canada.

Just a few miles south of the city limits, in Fort Mohave, is the Mojave Crossing Event Center, an arena with a seating capacity of 5,000. As the largest stadium/arena in Mohave County, it is frequently used for large events such as graduation ceremonies, circuses, indoor extreme motocross, monster truck rallies, and concerts.

== Education and culture ==
Bullhead City is home to several educational institutions, the largest of which is the Bullhead City Campus of Mohave Community College. The campus also houses Northern Arizona University's Bullhead City campus, which offers four-year degree programs. Recently, MCC Bullhead City received a donation of $1.8 million from the BHHS Legacy Foundation to build a 14,000 sq. ft. Health Sciences Building. Arizona governor Jan Brewer attended the groundbreaking ceremony in January 2012. Construction of the Health Sciences building was completed in August 2012.

=== Post-secondary institutions ===
- Mohave Community College, Bullhead City Campus
- Northern Arizona University, Bullhead City Campus
- Palo Verde Community College, Needles Campus
- Community College of Southern Nevada, Laughlin

=== K-12 schools ===
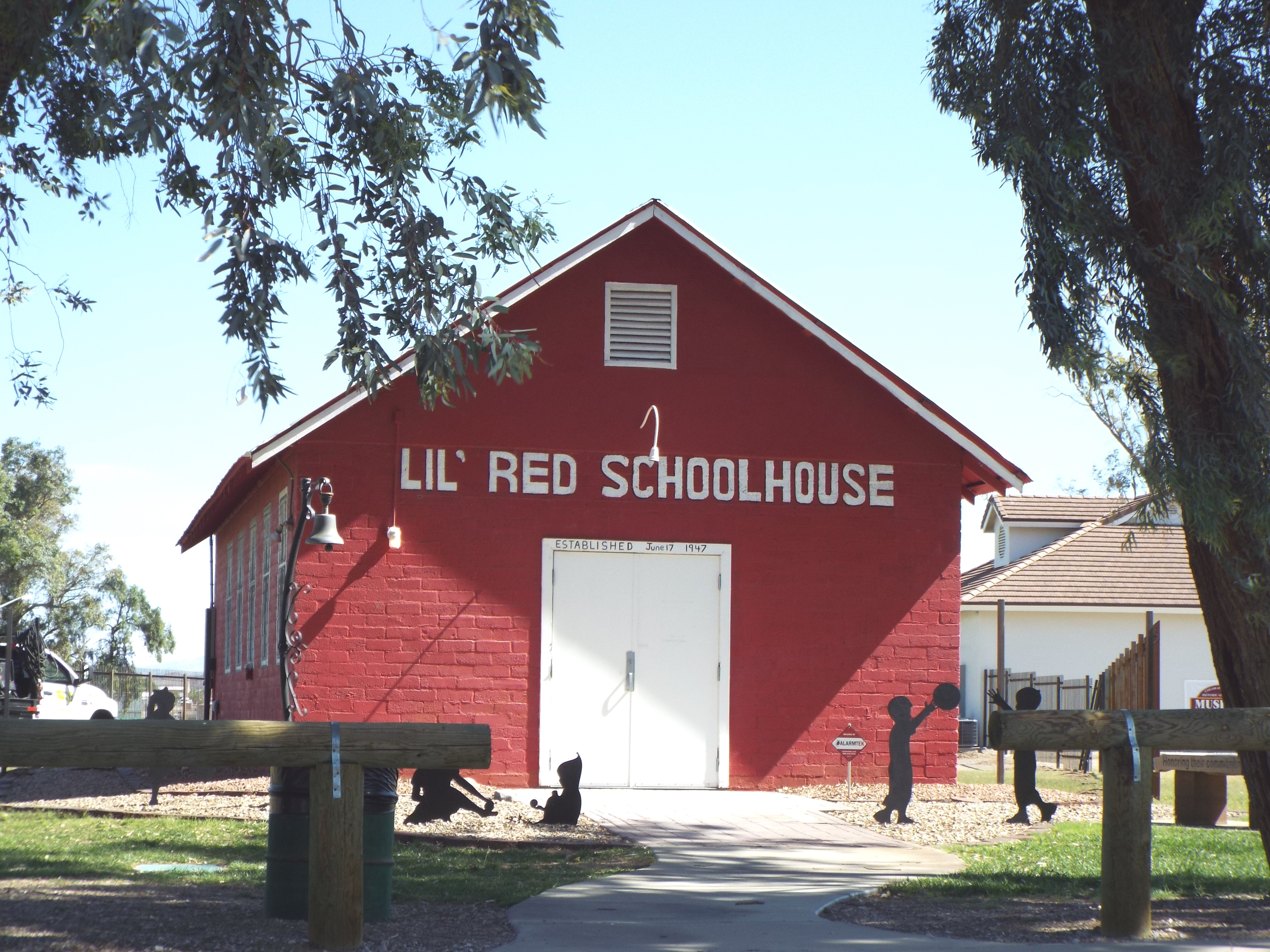
The Little Red Schoolhouse (1947), Bullhead City's first school

Bullhead City's elementary and junior high schools are operated by the Bullhead City School District. These schools include Sunrise Elementary School, Coyote Canyon Elementary School, Desert Valley Elementary School, Diamondback Elementary School, Bullhead City Middle School, and Fox Creek Junior High School. Bullhead City's high schools, Mohave High School and River Valley High School, are operated by the Colorado River Union High School District. Other nearby high schools are Laughlin High School and Needles High School. Additionally, Mohave Accelerated Learning Center are public charter schools serving K-12 students in Bullhead City and the surrounding area. The Academy of Building Industries (AOBI) High School in Fort Mohave is a public vocational charter school, teaching the building industries trades alongside core academic classes. Other schools in nearby communities include Young Scholar's Academy, Mohave Valley Junior High, Camp Mohave Elementary, and Fort Mohave Elementary. Laughlin and Needles also have public elementary schools.

=== Libraries ===
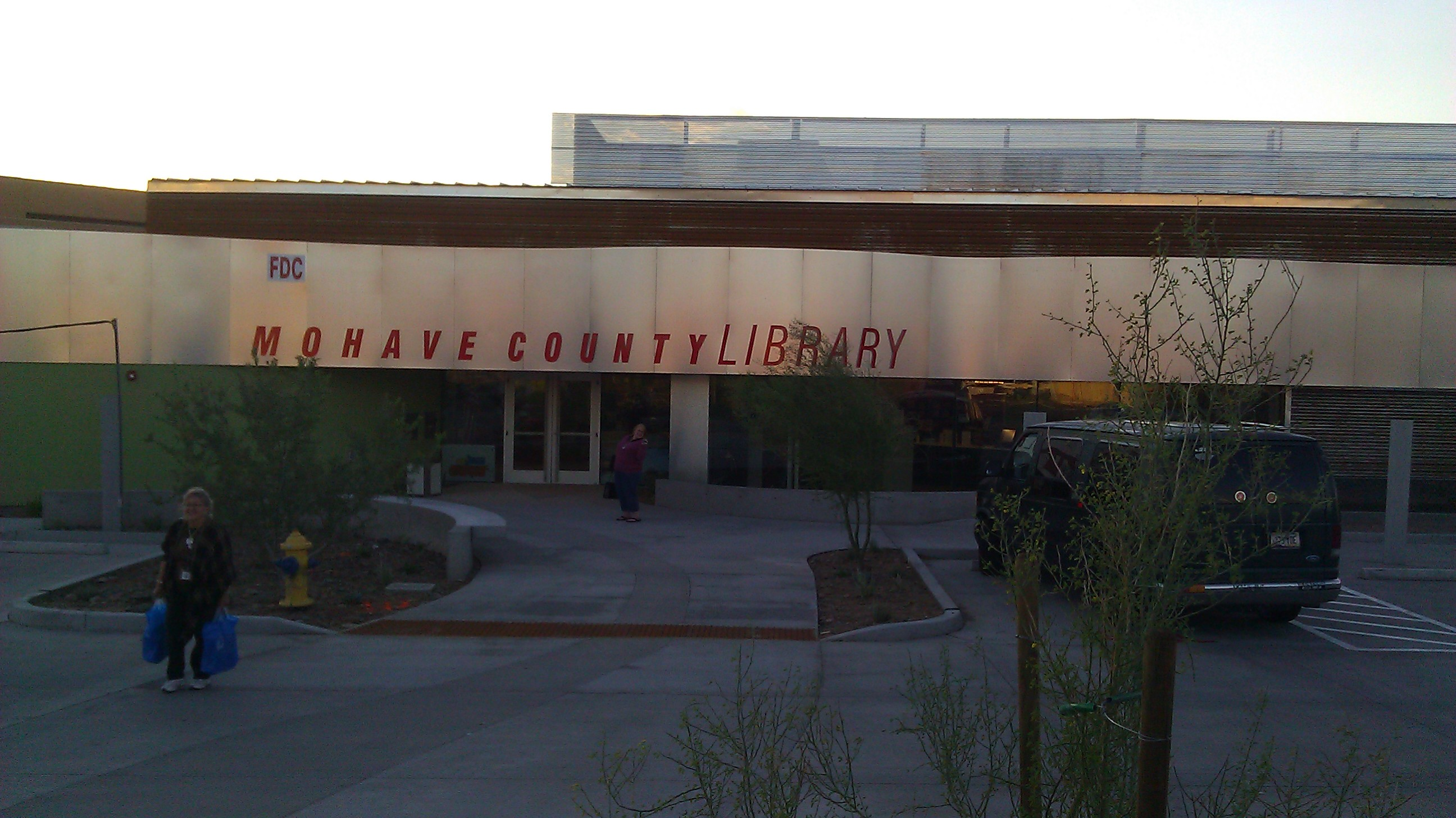
Mohave County Library in Bullhead City was remodeled and expanded in 2011. Its $10 million, 24,000 sq. ft. building uses the most recent technologies for adapting buildings for the desert climate, and is designed to resemble a rustic warehouse.

The Bullhead City area is home to four public libraries: two Mohave County Libraries (Bullhead City and Fort Mohave), one Clark County Library (Laughlin) and one San Bernardino County Library (Needles). Bullhead City's library recently reopened after a major expansion to include a teen section, children section, 11,000 sq. ft. adult section, public computers, sound-proof rooms, and conference rooms for the community. The new "green" building was partially paid for by an environmental grant. Its innovative design, which features energy saving technologies and special skylights that take advantage of the desert sun, comes from architect Will Bruder.

=== Colorado River Concert Association ===
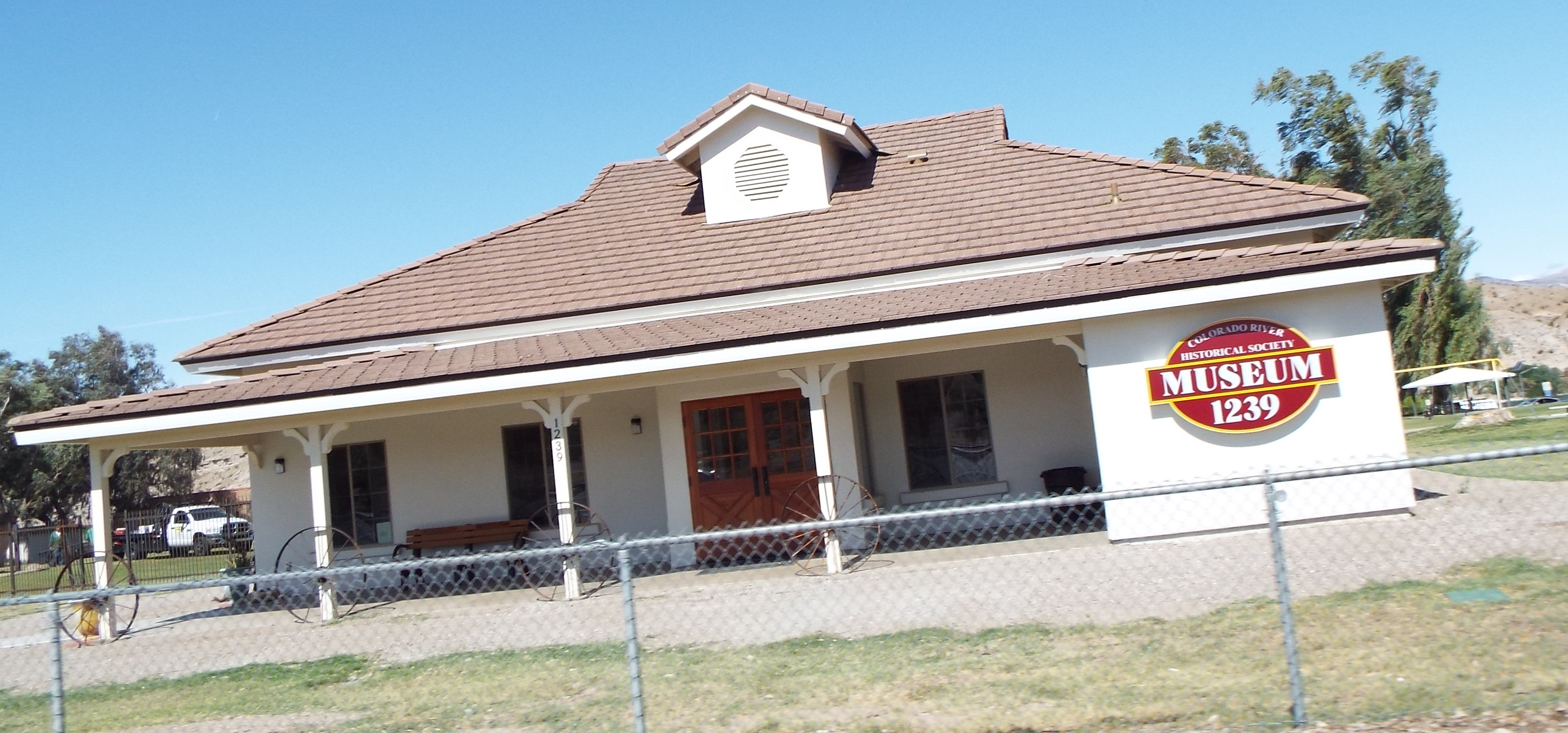
Colorado River Historical Society & Museum

The locally organized Colorado River Concert Association is a group of local citizens who attract performing artists to the community. Their purpose is to provide entertainment to the community while offering opportunities to local students who are interested in the performing arts. The association usually attracts three to five artists per year to perform in local high school auditoriums. In the past, the association has brought such artists as John Davidson, The Celtic Tenors, Presidio Brass, Alpin Hong, the Montana Mandolin Society, and QuatroCelli.

=== Colorado River Museum and Historical Society ===
Located in Bullhead City, just north of the Laughlin Bridge, the Colorado River Museum includes replicas of area landmarks, Native American artifacts and displays of historical items, from early settlers to the first slot machines. The museum is operated by the non-profit Colorado River Historical Society. It is open from September through May.

== Transportation ==
=== Train, bus, and highway ===
The Bullhead City area is accessible by Interstate 40 (via Needles or Kingman), Amtrak (via Needles BNSF), Greyhound, and Arizona State Routes 95 and 68. Bullhead City also operates a public transit system, the Bullhead Area Transit System (BATS). Sister cities Needles and Laughlin also operate their own small public transit systems.

Bullhead City is served by the bus companies Greyhound and TUFESA. Several private shuttle companies connect Bullhead City with Harry Reid International Airport in Las Vegas. The city is also home to several cab companies.

=== Airports ===
The Laughlin/Bullhead International Airport is the largest airport in Mohave County, but there are currently no scheduled commercial flights there. Previously, American Airlines had provided daily flights to and from Phoenix. Recently, the airport's runway was extended to 8,500 feet (2,600 m) to accommodate larger aircraft.

In 2011, it was named Airport of the Year by the Arizona Department of Transportation. "More than 115,000 people flew into Laughlin/Bullhead International Airport on casino-sponsored charters in 2010." In the 1980s the airport was home to the helicopters of the TV show Airwolf.

The Bullhead City area is also home to two smaller airports. Eagle Airpark is a 40-acre (160,000 m^{2}) rural airport south of the city limits. Sun Valley Airport is a public use airport with a residential airpark. Neither of these airports offer commercial air service.

== Media ==
The Bullhead City area is home to three local newspapers: the Mohave Valley Daily News, The Laughlin Nevada Times, and The Needles Desert Star, with editorial offices in Bullhead City. River City Newspapers owns all three of these newspapers, along with the Kingman Miner and Today's News in Lake Havasu City. The Mohave County Standard, published in Kingman and covering news throughout Mohave County, circulates in Bullhead City, as does the monthly Mohave County Economic Development Journal. The Las Vegas Review-Journal and Arizona Republic newspapers also have limited availability in the area.

Bullhead City is part of the Las Vegas television market. However, Phoenix news stations are standard in local cable TV subscriptions to provide Arizona news coverage. Bullhead City residents report it can be difficult and expensive to add Las Vegas broadcast news channels to their cable TV package, despite Las Vegas being only 90 miles north of the area and Phoenix being situated nearly 300 miles southeast. The advent of internet streaming and online newspaper publishing has made it much easier for residents in the Colorado River valley, often called the Tri-state area due to its inclusion of parts of Nevada, California, and Arizona, to access news broadcasts and publications from Las Vegas, which is the closest large metropolitan area.

Based in neighboring Laughlin, Nevada, cable TV station TV2/KLBC, has been in business since 1989, and has provided local television programming to Bullhead City and adjoining communities in Arizona. Bullhead City, Mohave County and for many years, Arizona officials were routine guests on the popular TV2/KLBC-produced program The Morning Show, hosted by the television station's general manager, Bruce Clark. In March 2016, The Morning Show celebrated its 5,000th episode, and Clark died on June 15, 2019. Since his passing, the program has been renamed Take 2: The Morning Show and is hosted by Tara Marie Haywood. The Bullhead City Police Department also has been prominently featured on the locally produced show Tri-State on Patrol, which is exclusively broadcast on tv2/KLBC.

The City of Bullhead City operates a public service channel on Cable Channel 4 for Optimum subscribers, with most of the content also available for viewing on the city's website. More than a dozen other regional network affiliates originate from Las Vegas and Phoenix.

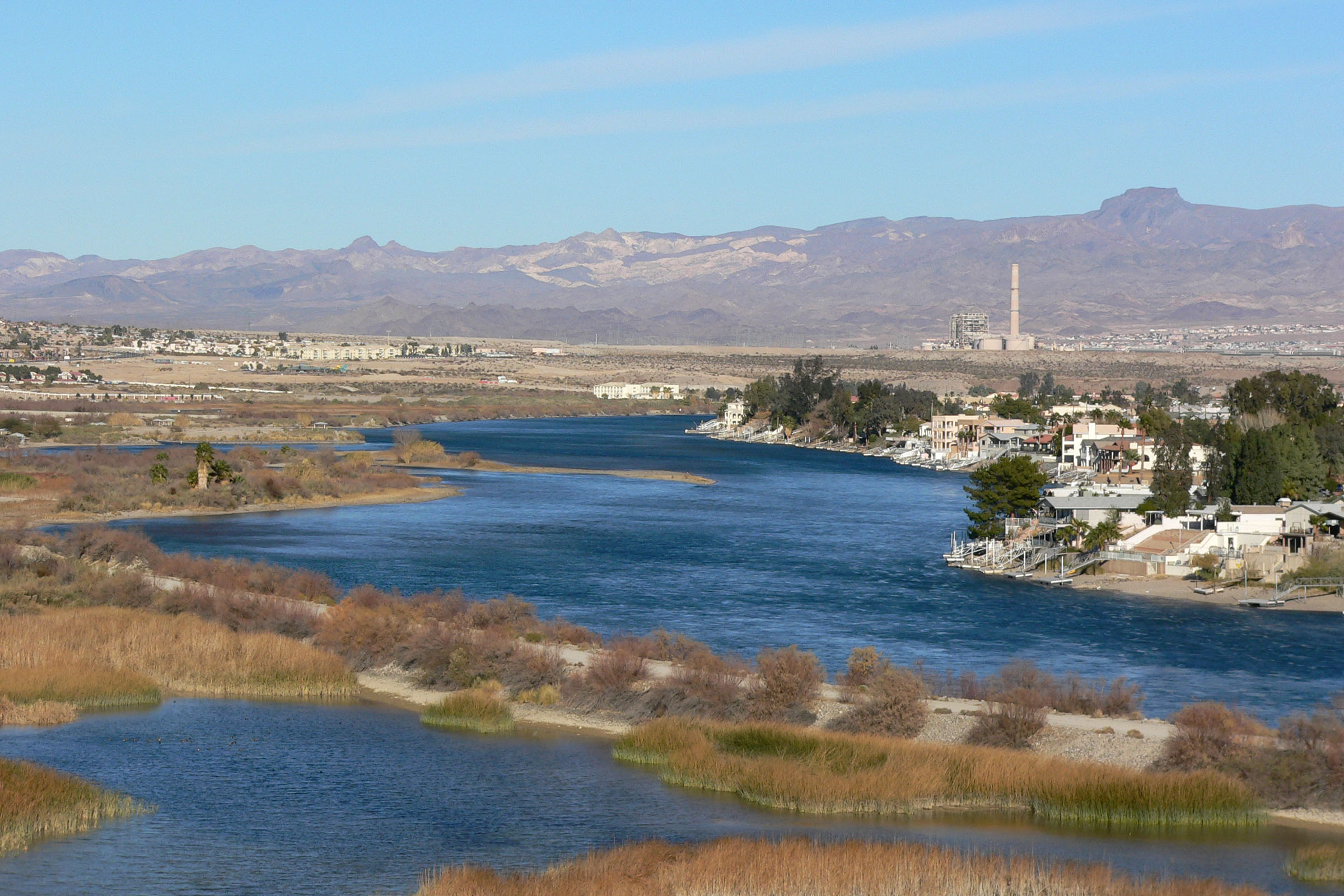
Bullhead City along the Colorado River

Bullhead City is home to Cameron Broadcasting, the parent company of four local radio stations:

- KNKK (The Knack 107.1) Top 40 Pop
- KFLG (K-FLAG 94.7) Country
- KLUK (Lucky 98) Classic Rock
- KZZZ (1490am and 93.3fm) Talk Radio

Other radio stations available in the Bullhead City area are:

- KTOX (1340am and 92.9fm) Local Talk News, reportedly hosting the longest-running local morning talk show. (originates in Needles, California)
- KXWX (93.7) Active Rock
- KZUL (95.3) Adult Contemporary
- KIDD (103.9) Adult Hits
- KRRK (96.3) Classic Rock
- KVAL (104.9) Hot AC
- KCAN (92.5) Angel Broadcasting Network Christian Talk & Music
- KNLB (90.5) Christian Radio
- KJJJ (102.3) Country Music

== Religious, social, and special interest groups ==
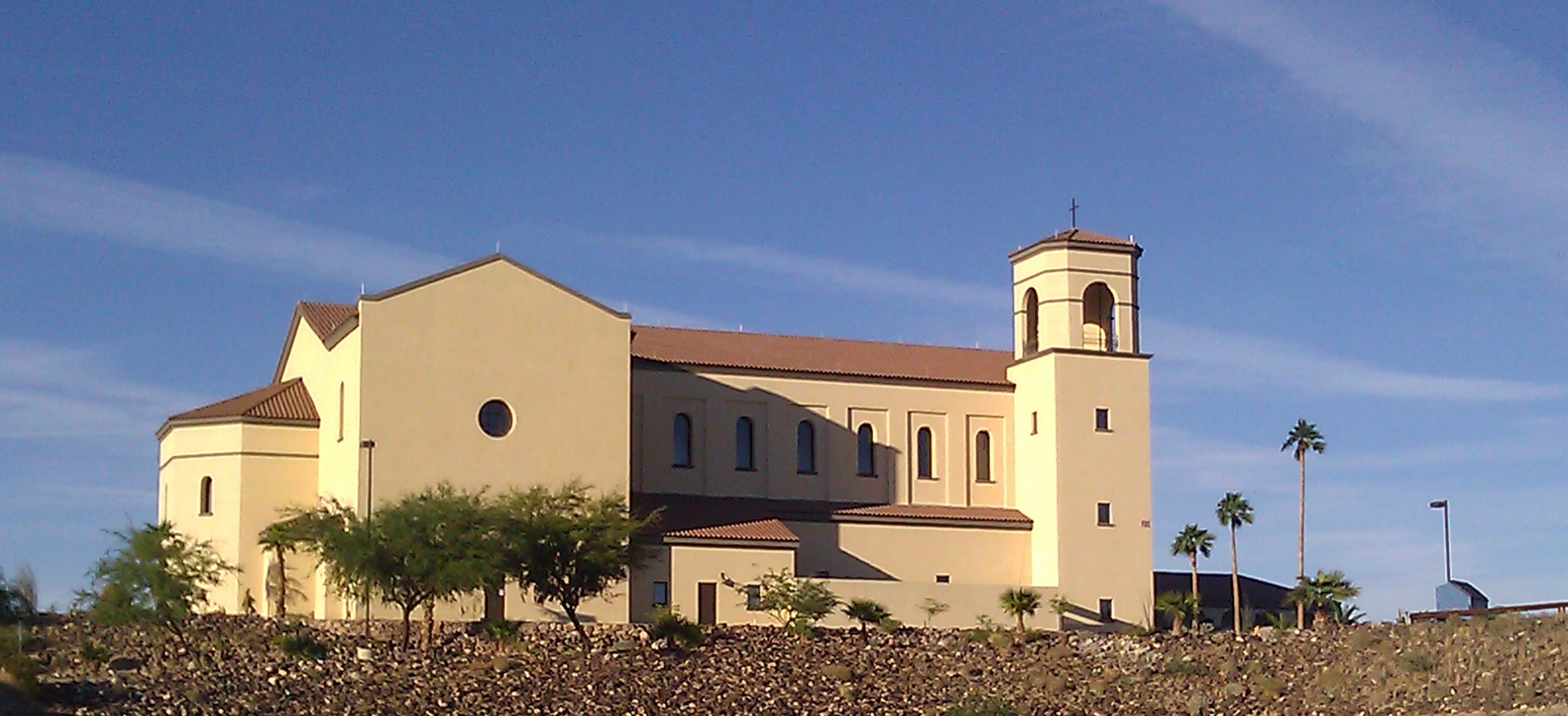
One of the largest buildings in the city, St. Margaret Mary Church in Bullhead City is visible for miles. It was completed in 2011.

The Bullhead City tri-state area is home to dozens of religious organizations. Among them are two Churches of Christ (non-instrumental), three Roman Catholic churches, four Lutheran churches, three Methodist churches, over a dozen Baptist churches, two LDS Churches, the Bullhead Islamic Center, two Jehovah's Witness Kingdom Halls, two Episcopal churches, two Seventh-day Adventist churches, Unity Church of the Mohave Valley, two Assemblies of God, Foursquare (Spirit Life Church), Anointed Word Church, Calvary Chapel, various Pentecostal churches (including The Potter's House), and Harvest Bible Church (non-denominational) in Mohave Valley. A Temple Israel Ba Midbor (Jewish services in Laughlin), and active Neo-Pagan (Coven of the Canyon and River) and Buddhist communities (Soka Gakkai Colorado River District).

Bullhead City is also home to many special interest groups and social clubs. Among them are The Benevolent and Protective Order of Elks, Bullhead 4-Wheelers, Kiwanis, River Cities Players and Community Theater, Lions Clubs International, Shriners, the Colorado River Historical Society, and Moose International.

== Fort Mojave Indian Tribe ==
The Fort Mojave Indian Reservation covers almost 42,000 acres (170 km^{2}) in the tri-state area, and the local history is rich with Native American Culture. Currently, the tribe operates two casinos, one full-service hotel, and the Mojave Resort PGA Championship Golf Course.

== Environmental projects ==
In 2013, a 1,200 megawatt solar generating facility was built on over 10,000 acres (40 km^{2}), just over 10 miles (16 km) outside Bullhead City. In 2005, the decades-old Mohave Generating Station Coal Slurry Power Plant was closed to reduce air pollution and excessive river water use.

The Bullhead City Elementary School District has accepted a federal grant to convert a portion of their electricity to solar power.

=== White water rafting, kayaking, and scuba diving ===
The stretch of the Colorado River between Hoover Dam and Lake Mohave is mostly tame but offers a few white water rafting opportunities. If you decide not to hire a guide, permits are required to launch below Hoover Dam and can be obtained through the United States Bureau of Reclamation. Rafting supplies, canoes, kayak rentals and guided kayaking tours are available in Bullhead City. On Lake Mohave, scuba divers can explore Black Canyon, which has excellent diving conditions. Advanced divers can check out Ringbolt Rapids, where swift water makes for an additional challenge. Work Barge on the Arizona side has a 38-foot (12 m) tow barge that sank in 1946. Cabinsite Point has two boat wrecks to view.

=== Fishing ===
Fishing is popular on Lake Mohave and the Colorado River, which is plentiful with several species of fish, including rainbow trout, largemouth bass, striped bass, crappie, sunfish, catfish (channel), and carp. There are dozens of coves and inlets that are well known among fishing enthusiasts.

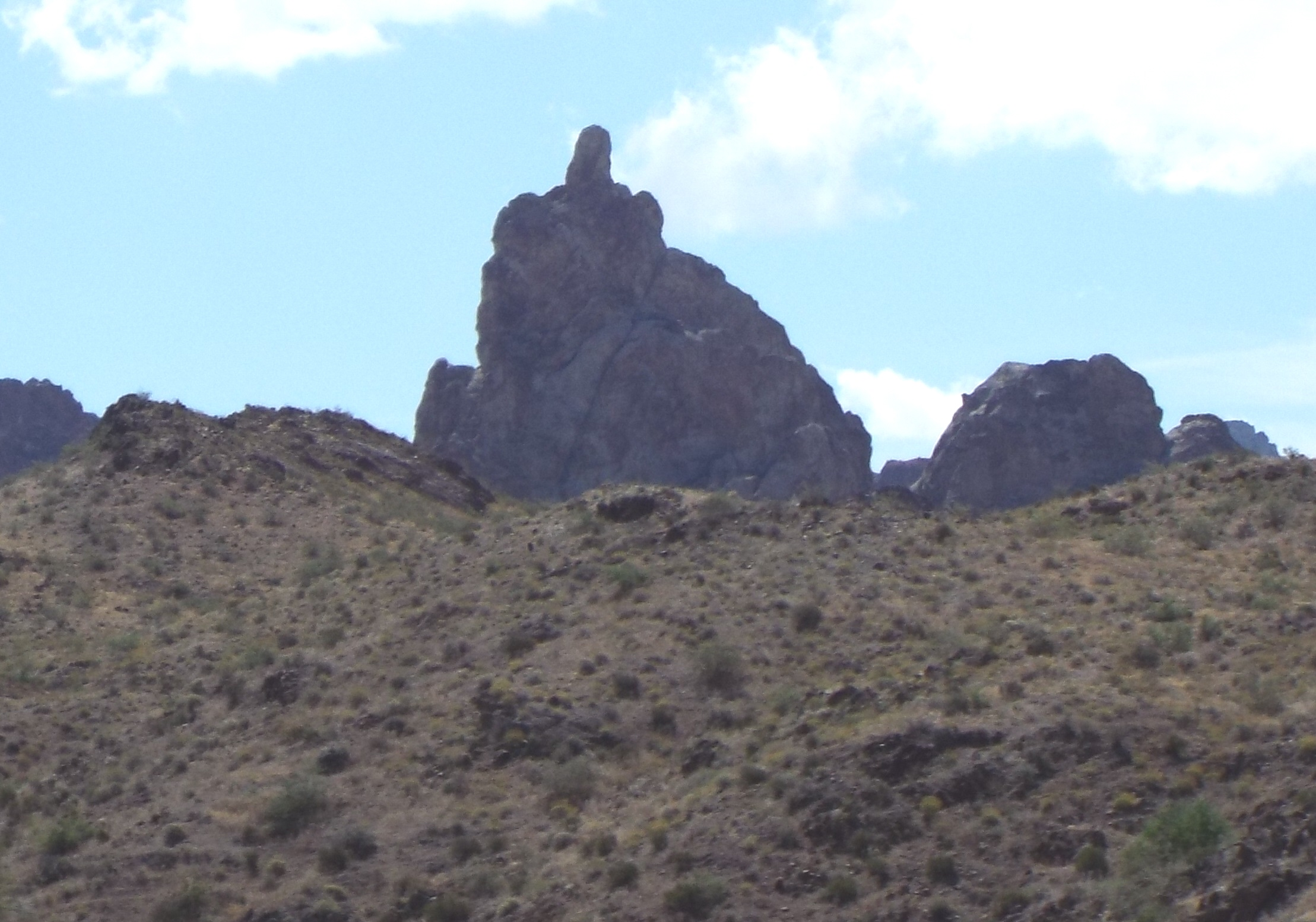
Finger Rock

=== Camping, biking, and hiking ===
The recreation area around Lake Mohave includes dozens of designated hiking trails, camp sites, and bicycle trails.

=== Lake resorts ===
There are two resorts on Lake Mohave: Cottonwood Cove and Lake Mohave Resort. Both resorts have lodging, campgrounds, restaurant, store, and a marina with a gas dock. There are also off-road vehicle roads and hiking trails around Lake Mohave. Supplies and equipment for off-roading, hiking, boating, scuba diving, and fishing are locally available. There are sporting goods stores, scuba diving instructors, guided kayaking tours, and watercraft rentals available throughout Bullhead City.

== Notable people ==
- Josh Briggs, pro wrestler born in Bullhead City, AZ
- Seamus Dever, actor; grew up in Bullhead City and graduated from Mohave High School in 1994
- Chris McCandless of Into the Wild fame; spent two months as a McDonald's employee in Bullhead City
- Ella Mae Morse, singer; died in Bullhead City in 1999 at the age of 75

== See also ==
- Fort Mohave, historical fort
- Oatman, Arizona
- Spirit Mountain Wilderness
