= Hardyville Cemetery =

Pioneer cemetery in Bullhead City, Mohave County, Arizona, US

- U.S. National Register of Historic Places
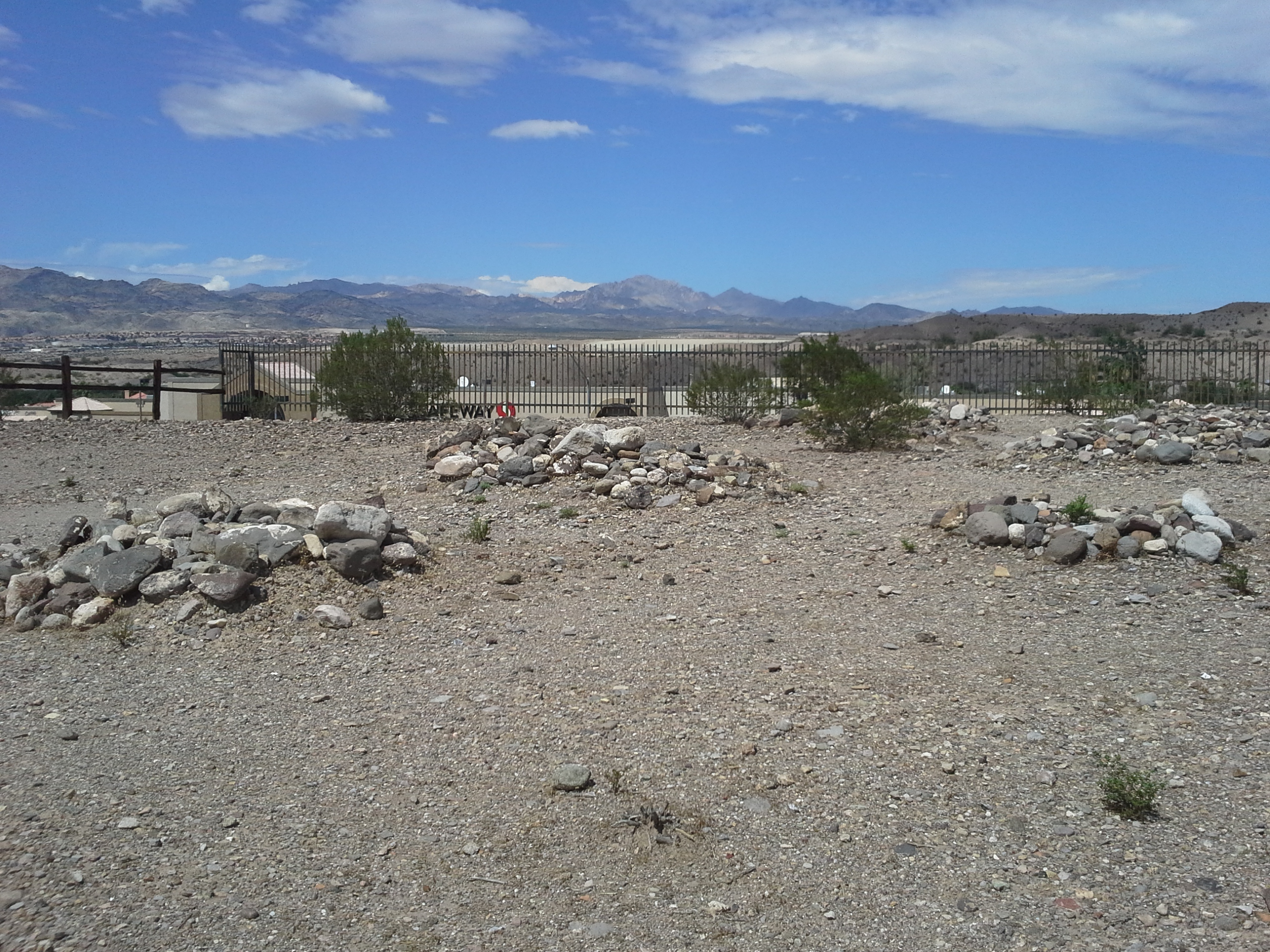
- Cemetery in 2013

- Location within Arizona Location within the United States
- Location: 1776 AZ 95, Bullhead City, Arizona
- Coordinates: 35°7′15″N 114°35′11″W
- Area: 2.5 acres (1.0 ha)
- NRHP reference No.: 01000905
- Added to NRHP: August 30, 2001

The Hardyville Cemetery, also known as the Hardyville Pioneer Cemetery, at 1776 Arizona State Route 95 in Bullhead City, Arizona, is a historic 2.5-acre (1.0 ha) cemetery that is listed on the National Register of Historic Places.

It is the only surviving significant remnant of Hardyville, a once-thriving shipping port for steamboats (on the Colorado River) and had served as the county seat of Mohave County. It contains 17 graves, each covered with a pile of cobble stones, as originally created.

It was listed on the National Register in 2001.
