= KLBC-TV2 =

Cable television station in Laughlin, Nevada (1989–2019)

- Country: US
- Broadcast area: Laughlin, Nevada

Ownership
- Owner: Chelsea Street Video Productions, Inc.

History
- Launched: 1989
- Founder: Bruce Clark
- Closed: 2019

Links
- Website: www.tv2klbc.com

KLBC-TV2 was a cable-only television station in Laughlin, Nevada, United States. It broadcast local programming on cable systems in Laughlin as well as nearby Bullhead City and Kingman, Arizona, and Needles, California. KLBC produced local news programming and other productions, including Tri-State On Patrol, following the activities of local police departments. It was an affiliate of UPN in the early 2000s.

While not carried on any broadcast translators, KLBC made overtures in 2014 to be carried on the translators owned by Mohave County, which operates transmitter sites in Kingman, Lake Havasu City, and other communities. The channel was removed from Suddenlink cable in Laughlin in 2019, as a result of a severed fiber-optic link and what Suddenlink claimed was $70,000 in unpaid fees to be included on the system over a three-year period.
