= Bohemia Visual Music =

American internet broadcast service and former television service

- Country: United States
- Headquarters: Phoenix, Arizona; Portland, Oregon; Los Angeles, California

Programming
- Picture format: 480i (SDTV)

Ownership
- Owner: Bohemia Visual Music LLC

History
- Launched: 1982; August 20, 2011 (internet)
- Closed: March 29, 2010 (TV)
- Former names: 24-7 Videos (2005-2006); Bohemia Afterdark (1982-2003)

Links
- Website: http://bvmtv.com

Bohemia Visual Music (also referred to as "BVM" and "BVM TV") is an Internet broadcast music video service in the United States that was formerly a Television Broadcast Station Service.

== History ==
Jeff Crawford who began his pursuit of Bohemial Afterdark in Phoenix by filming and recording bands such as Nirvana, Stone temple pilots, and others moved to Portland Oregon in the late 80's. He began filming bands in Portland and Seattle. Jeff bought some editing equipment and began to edit his concert tapes and created Bohemia after Dark and ran this program weekly on public television, often times running the tapes to the studio to ensure they meet broadcast times. The service began as Bohemia Afterdark in 1982 and operated in Phoenix, AZ but early history is unknown until 1990 when they moved to Portland, Oregon. In 1992 they began airing on KPDX Portland and then they moved to KWBP in 1994. In 1995 they began airing on 22 Network One affiliates. In 1997 Network One shut down and the service moved to KOIN and in 2001, the service moved back to Phoenix, airing on KASW, then in 2002, moved to KPHO-TV. In 2003 they got their own station, KPHE-LP, at the time broadcasting on channel 19 in Mesa, Arizona, and changed their name to Bohemia Visual Music. KPHE moved to channel 44 in Phoenix in 2005. Bohemia Visual Music changed their name to 24-7 Videos for a few months from mid-2005 to early-2006, then reverted to Bohemia Visual Music.

In July 2006, KPHE replaced Bohemia Visual Music with Spanish-language programming, and BVM was without a broadcast outlet until September 2006, when they began broadcasting on KORS-CA digital subchannel 16.2 in Portland.

In March 2008, Bohemia Visual Music began broadcasting on KDOC-TV 56.3 in Los Angeles, California and KJKZ-LP 27 in Fresno, California, but by July, BVM was no longer airing on these channels.

On March 29, 2010, Bohemia Visual Music left KORS-CA from its digital signal to focus on Internet Broadcasting. Now KORS-CD, it carries only Home Shopping Network (HSN) and America One.

As of August 20, 2011, Bohemia Visual Music relaunched with a website as an internet broadcast.

== Programming ==
Bohemia Visual Music featured a diverse mix of music video programming.

== Former affiliates ==
City	Station	Channel	Owner
Anaheim-Los Angeles, CA	KDOC-TV	56.3	Ellis Communications, Inc.
Phoenix, Arizona	KPHE-LD	44	Lotus Communications
Portland, Oregon	KORS-CD	16.2	WatchTV, Inc.
Fresno, California	KJKZ-LP	27	Cocola Broadcasting

== Logos ==
BVM logo, 2003-2005

BVM logo 2005–present

== Slogans ==
- Music Television, The Way It Should Be (2002-2010)
- It's About The Music (2003-2010)
- Your Music Channel (2008-2010)
