= List of UniMás affiliates =

UniMás logo

The following is a list of affiliates for UniMás, a Spanish language television network owned by TelevisaUnivision USA.

== Affiliates ==
List of UniMás affiliates
Media market	State/Dist./Terr.	Station	Channel	Notes
Douglas	Arizona	KFTU-DT	3.1	
Flagstaff−Phoenix	Arizona	KFPH-DT	13.1	(Note: Simulcast on KTVW-DT3.)
Green Valley	Arizona	KUVE-DT	46.2	
Phoenix	Arizona	KFPH-CD	35.1	(Note: Translator of KFPH-DT.)
Phoenix	Arizona	KTVW-DT	33.2	
Tucson	Arizona	KFTU-CD	34.1	
Tucson	Arizona	KUVE-CD	42.2	
Yuma	Arizona	KAJB	54.1	
Bakersfield	California	KBTF-CD	31.1	(Note: Simulcast on KUVI-DT3.)
Chico−Redding	California	KKTF-LD	30.1	
Chico−Redding	California	KUCO-LD	27.2	(Note: Translator of KKTF-LD.)
Fresno	California	KTFF-DT	61.1	
Los Angeles	California	KFTR-DT	46.1	
Palm Springs	California	KEVC-CD	5.1	
Sacramento	California	KTFK-DT	64.1	
Salinas−Monterey	California	KDJT-CD	33.1	
San Diego	California	KDTF-LD	36.1	
San Francisco	California	KFSF-DT	66.1	
Santa Barbara	California	KPMR	38.3	(Note: Simulcast of KTSB-CD.)
Santa Barbara	California	KTSB-CD	35.1	
Denver	Colorado	KTFD-TV	50.1	
Pueblo−Colorado Springs	Colorado	KGHB-CD	27.1	
Pueblo−Colorado Springs	Colorado	KVSN-DT	48.2	(Note: Simulcast of KGHB-CD.)
Hartford−New Haven	Connecticut	WUTH-CD	47.1	
Hartford−New Haven	Connecticut	WUVN	18.3	(Note: Simulcast of WUTH-CD.)
Washington	District of Columbia	WFDC-DT	14.4	
Fort Myers−Naples	Florida	WLZE-LD	51.2	(Note: Translator of WUVF-LD.)
Fort Myers−Naples	Florida	WUVF-LD	2.2	
Miami−Fort Lauderdale	Florida	WAMI-DT	69.1	
Orlando	Florida	WRCF-CD	29.1	
Tampa−St. Petersburg	Florida	WVEA-TV	50.6	
Atlanta	Georgia	WUVG-DT	34.2	
Boise	Idaho	KEVA-LD	34.3	(Note: Coming Soon on KEVA-LD3.)
Chicago	Illinois	WXFT-DT	60.1	
Indianapolis	Indiana	WHMB-TV	40.7	(Note: Coming Soon on WHMB-DT7.)
South Bend	Indiana	WHME-TV	46.9	(Note: Coming Soon on WHME-DT9.)
Boston	Massachusetts	WUTF-TV	27.1	
Las Vegas	Nevada	KELV-LD	27.1	
Las Vegas	Nevada	KINC	15.2	(Note: Simulcast of KELV-LD.)
Reno	Nevada	KRNS-CD	46.1	
Albuquerque–Santa Fe	New Mexico	KTFQ-TV	41.1	
New York City	New York	WFTY-DT	67.2	(Note: Satellite of WFUT-DT.)
New York City	New York	WFUT-DT	68.1	
Raleigh−Durham	North Carolina	WTNC-LD	26.1	(Note: Simulcast on WUVG-DT2.)
Cleveland	Ohio	WQHS-DT	61.2	
Oklahoma City	Oklahoma	KUOK	36.2	
Tulsa	Oklahoma	KUTU-CD	25.2	
Philadelphia	Pennsylvania	WFPA-CD	28.1	(Note: Simulcast on WUVP-DT2.)
Ponce–San Juan	Puerto Rico	WSTE-DT	7.1	
Nashville	Tennessee	WLLC-LD	42.2	
Austin	Texas	KTFO-CD	31.1	(Note: Simulcast on KAKW-DT2.)
Corpus Christi	Texas	KCRP-CD	41.1	
Dallas−Fort Worth	Texas	KSTR-DT	49.1	(Note: An ATSC 3.0 station, rebroadcast in ATSC 1.0 through KUVN-DT.)
El Paso	Texas	KTFN	65.1	(Note: Simulcast on KINT-DT2.)
Houston	Texas	KFTH-DT	67.1	
Laredo	Texas	KETF-CD	39.1	
McAllen−Brownsville	Texas	KTFV-CD	32.1	
McAllen−Brownsville	Texas	KNVO	48.2	(Note: Simulcast of KTFV-CD.)
San Angelo	Texas	KANG-LD	31.1	
San Antonio	Texas	KNIC-DT	17.1	
Salt Lake City	Utah	KUTH-DT	32.2	

== See also ==
- List of Telemundo affiliates
- List of Univision affiliates
