= List of Univision affiliates (table) =

Univision logo

The following is a list of affiliates for Univision, an American television network owned by TelevisaUnivision, which was the Spanish International Network (SIN) before 1 September 1987.

== Affiliates ==
List of Univision affiliates and owned-stations
Media market	State/Dist./Terr.	Station	Channel	Affiliated on	Owner	Notes
Phoenix	Arizona	KTVW-DT	33	1979	TelevisaUnivision	
Tucson	Arizona	KUVE-CD	42	2001	TelevisaUnivision	
Tucson	Arizona	KUVE-DT	46	2002	TelevisaUnivision	
Yuma	Arizona	KVYE	7	1996	Entravision Communications	
Fort Smith	Arkansas	KXUN-LD	14	2004	Pinnacle Media	
Fayetteville	Arkansas	KWNL-CD	14	2004	Pinnacle Media	
Little Rock	Arkansas	KLRA-CD	20	2013	Pinnacle Media	
Bakersfield	California	KABE-CD	39	1989	TelevisaUnivision	(Note: KABE's signal is repeated on KUVI-DT2.)
Chico–Redding	California	KUCO-LD	27	1994	Sinclair Broadcast Group	
Eureka	California	KEUV-LD	35	1994	Sinclair Broadcast Group	(Note: Semi-satellite of KUCO-LD.)
Fresno	California	KFTV-DT	21	1972	TelevisaUnivision	
Los Angeles	California	KMEX-DT **	34	1962	TelevisaUnivision	
Monterey	California	KSMS-TV	67	2004	Entravision Communications	
Palm Springs	California	KVER-CD	41	2004	Entravision Communications	
Sacramento	California	KUVS-DT	19	1972	TelevisaUnivision	
San Diego	California	KBNT-CD	17	1992	Entravision Communications	
San Diego	California	KDTF-LD	36.17	1997	Entravision Communications	(Note: Repeater of KBNT-CD.)
San Diego	California	K25RF-D	25	1992	Entravision Communications	
San Francisco	California	KDTV-DT	14	1975	TelevisaUnivision	
Santa Barbara	California	KPMR	38	2001	Entravision Communications	
Colorado Springs	Colorado	KVSN-DT	48	2009	Entravision Communications	(Note: Semi-satellite of KCEC.)
Denver	Colorado	KCEC	14	2017	TelevisaUnivision	(Note: Owned by TelevisaUnvision and operated by Entravision Communications.)
Hartford–New Haven	Connecticut	WUVN	18	2001	Entravision Communications	
Washington	District of Columbia	WFDC-DT	14	2005	TelevisaUnivision	
Fort Myers	Florida	WUVF-LD	2	2004	Media Vista Group, LLC	
Fort Myers	Florida	WLZE-LD	51	2004	Media Vista Group, LLC	(Note: Repeater of WUVF-LD.)
Miami–Fort Lauderdale	Florida	WLTV-DT	23	1971	TelevisaUnivision	
Orlando	Florida	WVEN-TV	43	2017	TelevisaUnivision	
Panama City	Florida	WSDW-LD	20	2024	SagamoreHill Broadcasting	
Tallahassee	Florida	WXTL-LD	36	2024	SagamoreHill Broadcasting	
Tampa	Florida	WVEA-TV	50	2017	TelevisaUnivision	
Atlanta	Georgia	WUVG-DT	34	2001	TelevisaUnivision	
Boise	Idaho	KEVA-LD	34	2024	SagamoreHill Broadcasting	
Chicago	Illinois	WGBO-DT	66	1995	TelevisaUnivision	
Indianapolis	Indiana	WHMB-TV	40	2024	Family Broadcasting Corporation	
South Bend	Indiana	WHME-TV	46	2024	Family Broadcasting Corporation	
Wichita	Kansas	KDCU-DT	46	2009	Entravision Communications	
Boston	Massachusetts	WUNI	66	2017	TelevisaUnivision	
Springfield	Massachusetts	WHTX-LD	43	2003	Entravision Communications	
Kansas City	Missouri	KUKC-LD	14	2005	Media Vista Group, LLC	
Minneapolis–St. Paul	Minnesota	WUMN-LD	21	2005	Media Vista Group, LLC	
Las Vegas	Nevada	KINC	15	1996	Entravision Communications	
Reno	Nevada	KREN-TV	27	2009	Entravision Communications	(Note: Previously affiliated with Univision from 1986 to 1994.)
Albuquerque	New Mexico	KLUZ-TV	14	2017	TelevisaUnivision	
New York City	New York	WXTV-DT	41	1970	TelevisaUnivision	
Raleigh–Durham	North Carolina	WUVC-DT	40	2003	TelevisaUnivision	
Cleveland	Ohio	WQHS-DT	61	2002	TelevisaUnivision	
Columbus	Ohio	WXOH-LD	25	2024	SagamoreHill Broadcasting	
Oklahoma City	Oklahoma	KUOK-CD	36	2004	Tyler Media Group	(Note: Repeater of KUOK.)
Tulsa	Oklahoma	KUTU-CD	25	2005	Tyler Media Group	
Woodward	Oklahoma	KUOK	36	2004	Tyler Media Group	
Harrisburg	Pennsylvania	WXBU	15	2024	Sinclair Broadcast Group	
Philadelphia	Pennsylvania	WUVP-DT	65	2002	TelevisaUnivision	
Ponce-San Juan	Puerto Rico	WSTE-DT	7	2025	TelevisaUnivision	
Nashville	Tennessee	WLLC-LD	42	2014	JKB Associates, Inc.	
Austin	Texas	KAKW-DT	62	2002	TelevisaUnivision	
Corpus Christi	Texas	KORO	28	1987	Entravision Communications	
Dallas–Fort Worth	Texas	KUVN-DT	23	1986	TelevisaUnivision	
El Paso	Texas	KINT-TV	26	2004	Entravision Communications	
Harlingen	Texas	KNVO	48	1992	Entravision Communications	
Houston	Texas	KXLN-DT	45	1987	TelevisaUnivision	
Laredo	Texas	KLDO-TV	27	1998	Entravision Communications	
Midland	Texas	KUPB	18	2001	Entravision Communications	
San Angelo	Texas	KEUS-LD	41	1992	Entravision Communications	
San Antonio	Texas	KWEX-DT	41	1962	TelevisaUnivision	
Victoria	Texas	KUNU-LD	21	1999	Morgan Murphy Media	
Salt Lake City	Utah	KUTH-DT	32	2004	TelevisaUnivision	
Bellingham–Seattle	Washington	KVOS-TV	12	2023	Weigel Broadcasting	
Kennewick	Washington	KVVK-CD	15	2007	Sinclair Broadcast Group	(Note: Repeater of KUNW-CD.)
Walla Walla	Washington	KORX-CD	16	2007	Sinclair Broadcast Group	
Yakima	Washington	KUNW-CD	2	2007	Sinclair Broadcast Group	

== See also ==
- List of Telemundo affiliates
- List of UniMás affiliates
