= ZUUS Latino =

American digital broadcast television network

- Type: Broadcast television network
- Country: United States
- Availability: Defunct
- Owner: ZUUS Media
- Launch date: November 2013
- Dissolved: January 2016
- Official website: zuus.com

ZUUS Latino was an American digital broadcast television network that was owned by Zuus Media. The network specialized in broadcasting Spanish music videos; its playlist of videos extended from the 1990s through the present day. The network also aired occasional informercials in prime time and other high-dollar day parts. It operated from November 2013 to January 2016.

== History ==
In 2013, Zuus Media had purchased The Country Network, renaming it ZUUS Country, and had plans to launch a number of ZUUS-branded music video channels of various formats; ZUUS Latino was the only other format to ever make it to air.

In January 2016, Zuus Media folded. ZUUS Country was sold off and reverted to its previous brand as The Country Network; ZUUS Latino was shut down.

== Former affiliates ==
The following list is of all of the former affiliates that carried ZUUS Latino from its launch in November 2013, until its closure in January 2016.

Media market	State	Station	Channel	Operator
Yuma	Arizona	KVYE-DT3	7.3	Entravision
Fresno	California	KMSG-DT4	39.4	Cocola Broadcasting
Monterey	California	KSMS-DT4	67.4	Entravision
Sacramento	California	KSAO-DT7	49.7	Cocola Broadcasting
San Francisco	California	KFTL-CD	28.1	LocusPoint Networks
Santa Barbara	California	KPMR-DT4	38.4	Entravision
Washington, D.C.	District of Columbia	WMDO-DT3	47.3	Entravision
Orlando	Florida	WRCF-CD4	29.4	LocusPoint Networks
Tampa	Florida	WVEA-DT4	62.3	Entravision
Boise	Idaho	KZAK-LD4	49.4	Cocola Broadcasting
Boston	Massachusetts	WUNI-DT3	27.3	Entravision
Reno	Nevada	KRNS-DT2	46.2	Entravision
Albuquerque	New Mexico	KLUZ-DT4	41.4	Entravision
Corpus Christi	Texas	KORO-DT4	28.4	Entravision
El Paso	Texas	KTFN-DT3	65.3	Entravision
Laredo	Texas	KLDO-DT3	27.3	Entravision
Odessa	Texas	KUPB-DT2	18.2	Entravision
