= List of Great Entertainment Television affiliates =

The following is a list of affiliates for Great Entertainment Television, a digital subchannel network owned by Sony Pictures Entertainment.

== Affiliates ==
List of current Great Entertainment Television affiliates
Media market	State/Dist./Terr.	Station	Channel
Birmingham	Alabama	WVTM-TV	13.5
Huntsville	Alabama	W34EY-D	38.3
Mobile	Alabama	WPAN	53.3
Flagstaff	Arizona	KFPH-DT	13.3
Phoenix	Arizona	KFPH-CD	35.3
Tucson	Arizona	KUVE-DT	46.3
Fresno	California	KFTV-DT	21.2
Fresno	California	KTFF-LD	41.2
Los Angeles	California	KFTR-DT	46.2
Sacramento	California	KTFK-DT	64.3
San Francisco	California	KDTV-DT	14.3
San Diego	California	KSKT-CD	43.2
Denver	Colorado	KCEC	14.3
Grand Junction	Colorado	KLML	20.5
Hartford–New Haven	Connecticut	WTIC-TV	61.3
Washington	District of Columbia	WFDC-DT	14.2
Fort Myers	Florida	WGPS-LD	22.2
Fort Myers	Florida	WZVN-TV	26.4
Jacksonville	Florida	WCWJ	17.4
Miami–Fort Lauderdale	Florida	WAMI-DT	69.3
Orlando	Florida	WOTF-TV	43.2
Panama City	Florida	WPCT	46.5
Tampa–St. Petersburg	Florida	WVEA-TV	50.3
West Palm Beach	Florida	WPTV-TV	5.5
Atlanta	Georgia	WUVG-DT	34.3
Honolulu	Hawaii	KHON-TV	2.3
Boise	Idaho	KBSE-LD	33.2
Bloomington	Illinois	WYZZ-TV	43.2
Champaign	Illinois	WCQA-LD	16.2
Chicago	Illinois	WGBO-DT	66.3
Fort Wayne	Indiana	WFWC-CD	45.2
Indianapolis	Indiana	WISH-TV	8.2
Lafayette	Indiana	WLFI-TV	18.2
South Bend	Indiana	WNDU-TV	16.7
Ames–Des Moines	Iowa	KCWI-TV	23.5
Cedar Rapids	Iowa	KWKB	20.9
Topeka	Kansas	KTKA-TV	49.5
Wichita	Kansas	KFVT-LD	34.2
Bowling Green	Kentucky	WKUT-LD	25.5
Lexington	Kentucky	WLJC-TV	65.4
Louisville	Kentucky	WHAS-TV	11.6
Baton Rouge	Louisiana	K29LR-D	47.2
Lafayette	Louisiana	KDCG-CD	22.2
New Orleans	Louisiana	WWL-TV	4.5
Baltimore	Maryland	WBAL-TV	11.4
Baltimore	Maryland	WQAW-LD	69.2
Boston	Massachusetts	WUNI	66.3
Detroit	Michigan	WPXD-TV	31.6
Flint	Michigan	WAQP	49.11
Grand Rapids	Michigan	WXMI	17.5
Minneapolis–Saint Paul	Minnesota	KSTC-TV	5.4
Kansas City	Missouri	KSHB-TV	41.4
St. Louis	Missouri	KSDK	5.2
Jackson	Mississippi	WAPT	16.5
Charlotte	North Carolina	WSOC-TV	9.3
Greensboro–Winston-Salem	North Carolina	WGPX-TV	16.7
Raleigh	North Carolina	WUVC-DT	40.4
Valley City–Fargo	North Dakota	KRDK-TV	4.10
Omaha	Nebraska	KETV	7.5
Las Vegas	Nevada	KHSV	21.4
Atlantic City	New Jersey	WMGM-TV	40.2
Albuquerque	New Mexico	KASY-TV	50.3
Albany	New York	WNYT	13.4
Buffalo	New York	WNYO-TV	49.2
New York City	New York	WFUT-DT	68.3
Rochester	New York	WGCE-CD	6.3
Syracuse	New York	WMJQ-CD	40.5
Cleveland	Ohio	WQHS-DT	61.3
Toledo	Ohio	WTOL	11.6
Oklahoma City	Oklahoma	KOCO-TV	5.6
Tulsa	Oklahoma	KGEB	53.6
Portland	Oregon	KOIN	6.2
Johnstown	Pennsylvania	WWCP-TV	8.4
Philadelphia	Pennsylvania	WFPA-CD	28.2
Pittsburgh	Pennsylvania	WPCB-TV	40.5
Scranton	Pennsylvania	WYOU	22.3
Greenville–Spartanburg	South Carolina	WLOS	13.5
Columbia	South Carolina	WKTC	63.6
Chattanooga	Tennessee	WYHB-CD	39.3
Jackson	Tennessee	WYJJ-LD	27.3
Knoxville	Tennessee	WKNX-TV	7.2
Memphis	Tennessee	WLMT	30.4
Nashville	Tennessee	WKUW-LD	40.5
Amarillo	Texas	KAUO-LD	15.2
Austin	Texas	KAKW-DT	62.3
Dallas–Fort Worth	Texas	KDFW	4.4
Houston	Texas	KFTH-DT	67.2
Lubbock	Texas	KNKC-LD	29.3
San Antonio	Texas	KWEX-DT	41.2
Salt Lake City	Utah	KUTH-DT	32.3
Norfolk	Virginia	WAVY-TV	10.3
Roanoke	Virginia	WSLS-TV	10.2
Richmond	Virginia	WRIC-TV	8.3
Spokane	Washington	KREM	2.6
Seattle	Washington	KUSE-LD	46.1
Madison	Wisconsin	WZCK-LD	8.2
Milwaukee	Wisconsin	WISN-TV	12.6
