= KDTF =

KDTF may refer to:

- KDTF-LD, a low-power television station (channel 16, virtual 36) licensed to serve San Diego, California, United States
- KTCD-LP, a defunct low-power television station (channel 31) formerly licensed to serve San Diego, which held the call sign KDTF-LP from 2011 to 2012
- KBNT-CD, a low-power television station (channel 24, virtual 17) licensed to serve San Diego, which held the call sign KDTF-CA from 2010 to 2011
