= Channel 46 low-power TV stations in the United States =

The following low-power television stations broadcast on digital or analog channel 46 in the United States:

- K46KI-D in Woody Creek, Colorado, to move to channel 14

The following television stations, which are no longer licensed, formerly broadcast on digital or analog channel 46 in the United States:

- K46BY-D in Capulin, etc., New Mexico
- K46CT in Woodland, Utah
- K46DY in Bismarck, North Dakota
- K46EH in Fairbanks, Alaska
- K46EI in Fillmore/Meadow, etc., Utah
- K46FB-D in Austin, Nevada
- K46FI in Grants, New Mexico
- K46GF in Santa Maria, California
- K46GY in Santa Fe, New Mexico
- K46HW-D in Preston, Idaho
- K46JY in Kemmerer, Wyoming
- K46KH in Carlin, Nevada
- K46MX-D in Lowry, South Dakota
- KAZJ-LP in Norfolk, Nebraska
- KHLU-CD in Honolulu, Hawaii
- KMKI-LD in Cedar Falls, Iowa
- KPBI-CA in Fort Smith, Arkansas
- KPMT-LP in Pullman, Washington
- KQVE-LP in La Vernia, Texas
- KRYM-LP in Raymondville, Texas
- KTCD-LP in San Diego, California
- KTXC-LP in Canyon, Texas
- KXWL-LP in Keokuk, Iowa
- KZAB-LP in Abilene, Texas
- W46AX-D in Bryson City, North Carolina
- W46CF in Tuscumbia, Alabama
- W46CW in Jackson/Brandon, Mississippi
- W46EO-D in Culebra, Puerto Rico
- W46IT-D in Port Henry, New York
- WBKM-LP in Chana, Illinois
- WDLE-LP in Pigeon Forge, Tennessee
- WLOT-LP in Watertown, New York
- WQVC-CD in Greensburg, Pennsylvania
- WUEM-LD in Athens, Georgia
- WVEA-LP in Tampa, Florida
- WWEK-LD in Augusta, Georgia
- WXSX-CA in Savannah, Georgia
