= Channel 46 =

Channel 46 refers to several television stations:

== Canada ==
The following television stations formerly broadcast on digital channel 46 (UHF frequencies covering 663.25-667.75 MHz) in Canada:

- CJPM-DT in Saguenay, Quebec
- CKAL-DT-1 in Lethbridge, Alberta

== Mexico ==
The following television network operates on virtual channel 46 in Mexico:

- Televisión Tabasqueña in the state of Tabasco

== See also ==
- Channel 46 TV stations in Mexico
- Channel 46 digital TV stations in the United States
- Channel 46 virtual TV stations in the United States
- Channel 46 low-power TV stations in the United States
