= WFTT-TV =

Television station in Venice, Florida

- Venice–Tampa–St. Petersburg, Florida; United States
- City: Venice, Florida
- Channels: Digital: 25 (UHF); Virtual: 62

Programming
- Affiliations: 62.1: Scientology Network; for others, see § Subchannels

Ownership
- Owner: Entravision Communications (sale to Sunset Boulevard Broadcasting Corporation pending); (Entravision Holdings, LLC)

History
- First air date: May 3, 1991
- Former call signs: WBSV-TV (1991–2000); WVEA-TV (2000–2017)
- Former channel numbers: Analog: 62 (UHF, 1991–2009)
- Former affiliations: Independent (1991–2001); Univision (2001–2017); UniMás (2017–2022); NRB TV (2022)
- Call sign meaning: Telefutura Tampa (former name of UniMás)

Technical information
- Licensing authority: FCC
- Facility ID: 16788
- ERP: 750 kW
- HAAT: 472 m (1,549 ft)
- Transmitter coordinates: 27°49′10.8″N 82°15′38″W

Links
- Public license information: Public file; LMS

WFTT-TV (channel 62) is a television station licensed to Venice, Florida, United States, serving the Tampa Bay area as an affiliate of the Scientology Network. Owned by Entravision Communications, the station maintains transmitter facilities in Riverview, Florida.

Channel 62 began broadcasting as WBSV-TV on May 3, 1991. It was an independent station targeting the Venice–Sarasota–Bradenton area, including local newscasts in its early years. It was built by DeSoto Broadcasting, which had bought the construction permit from Venice Broadcasting after a years-long process protracted by issues locating the station's tower. Parallel to channel 62, the Spanish International Network, later Univision, established a Tampa Bay presence with the launch of a translator on channel 50 in 1982. It moved to channel 61 in 1987 and became known as WVEA-LP in 1995. The station instituted local newscasts in 1998.

In 1998, Entravision agreed to buy WFTT-TV, and in March 2001, channel 62 moved its transmitter to Riverview and became WVEA-TV, essentially upgrading the former WVEA-LP to full-power status. During this time, Univision also bought a Tampa Bay station—WBHS (channel 50), which became the original WFTT when Telefutura (now UniMás) launched in January 2002. Entravision's agreements with Univision, which ran more than 20 years from the time of the WBHS purchase, prevented the network from moving its affiliation. In 2017, Univision moved the network programming and WVEN-TV call letters to its own transmitter on channel 50, but Entravision continued to operate both stations until the end of 2021, when channel 62 lost its programming from UniMás. The station began broadcasting Scientology Network in 2022, and in 2026 Entravision agreed to sell it to a church affiliate.

== History ==
=== Construction and early years ===
Channel 62 was allocated to Venice, Florida, in 1984 at the petition of the Davis family and Holiday Group Limited, which sought to build an independent station in the area. Six other groups applied to the Federal Communications Commission (FCC) for the channel by September, and by June 1985 there were five applicants. Two groups dropped out in July ahead of comparative hearing, which took place in September. By November, only Holiday Group and Venice Broadcasting were in contention.

On March 26, 1986, FCC administrative law judge Walter Miller awarded the construction permit to Venice Broadcasting, finding that the ownership makeup of Holiday Group "has proven to be a sham"; an American Indian man, was stated to be the director but found Miller to be "nothing more than a front ... [and] a shill" for the other investors. Holiday Group appealed Miller's ruling to the FCC, whose review board encouraged the parties to settle. They did in November 1986, clearing the way for Venice Broadcasting.

With a permit in hand, the construction of channel 62—given the call sign WBSV-TV (Bradenton, Sarasota, Venice)—was delayed by problems in siting its tower. Venice Broadcasting originally proposed a 1,023-foot (312 m) tower near the intersection of Interstate 75 and State Road 72, which was to be the tallest structure in Sarasota County. The Florida Department of Transportation objected, claiming that the site lay on direct paths between airports and would create an air hazard. That same year, the state imposed a moratorium on new tall towers after a plane struck a cable television tower in Venice, killing three. No construction work had taken place by March 1989, when Venice Broadcasting asked to assign the permit to DeSoto Broadcasting, which included state legislator Jim Lombard, magazine publisher Danford L. Sawyer Jr., and others.

DeSoto announced in May 1990 that it would begin broadcasting in January 1991 from a 572-foot (174 m) tower in Venice. Proposed programming was targeted at viewers over 50, with 12 hours of programming from the Star Television Network and local news coverage which would compete with WWSB (channel 40) in Sarasota. The station missed that launch date—during which time Star ceased programming in January 1991—but began on May 3, 1991. The station was not a financial success. The 5 p.m. newscast failed to find an audience and was dropped, while several programs from Blab TV were added to the lineup. The 10 p.m. news remained on the air, utilizing its own resources as well as those of Tampa NBC affiliate WFLA-TV. By 1994, WBSV was airing brief news updates along with hours of infomercials, sports, and conservative talk programs.

In 1997, DeSoto Broadcasting agreed to sell the station for $11 million to Global Broadcasting Systems of New York. Global, which intended to broadcast home shopping programming on WBSV, filed for bankruptcy protection, and the agreement to buy the station from DeSoto was included in Global's bankruptcy auction. No bidder bought the agreement.

=== WVEA-TV: Univision for Tampa Bay ===
Meanwhile, in Tampa, a new station began on June 13, 1982, on channel 50 as a satellite-fed translator for what was then known as the Spanish International Network (SIN). It was owned by Joaquín Blaya, the former vice president of Miami's WLTV and at the time president of SIN, and the station was named Bahía Honda, after a bay in Cuba. In November 1987, the station moved to channel 61 to make way for a new full-service station authorized on channel 50 for the Home Shopping Network.

Bahía Honda built a second low-power station, W63BH in Orlando, permitted in 1988 and on the air in 1992. When the Orlando station was permitted, Blaya had been joined by José Cancela, the vice president and general manager of WLTV. By 1992, Cancela and Blaya had both defected to rival network Telemundo; Univision made repeated requests of Cancela and Blaya to divest their ownership in W61BL and W63BH, threatening bad industry press for Telemundo as a result of Bahía Honda's owners "preferring" Univision for their own stations.

In 1995, Bahía Honda sold the Tampa and Orlando Univision low-power stations to Latin Communications Group, which up until then had primarily been a print media company, owning New York City's El Diario La Prensa. By this time, W61BL had become WVEA-LP. On November 2, 1998, WVEA-LP launched a half-hour weekday newscast, Noticias 61, with Javier Benavides and María del Pilar Ortiz as anchors and John Morales presenting weather.

DeSoto agreed to sell WBSV-TV in October 1998 to Entravision Communications Corporation for $17 million. At the same time Entravision was buying WBSV-TV, it acquired WVEA-LP. Channel 62 was switched to Spanish-language programming on March 29, 2001, when it became WVEA-TV and began broadcasting from Riverview. Shortly after, the station moved its offices to a site on Hillsborough Avenue in Tampa. The switch to full-power channel 62 put WVEA on many Pinellas County cable systems for the first time.

Univision itself entered the Tampa Bay market by way of its 2000 purchase of USA Broadcasting, which owned WBHS (channel 50) in Tampa. However, Entravision held a 21-year affiliation contract with Univision that prevented the network from moving its programming. That station became part of the new Telefutura (later UniMás) network on January 14, 2002, as WFTT. That same month, Univision entered into a joint sales agreement with Entravision, whereby Entravision provided local sales and promotional services to the Univision-owned Telefutura stations in six markets: Albuquerque, Boston, Denver, Orlando, Tampa, and Washington, D.C. This agreement was replaced by a new version in 2004.

In November 2015, Entravision centralized presentation for its Tampa newscasts at Orlando's WVEN-TV. It laid off some staff, moved others' positions to Orlando, and retained three multimedia journalists to report Tampa Bay stories for newscasts that were recorded in Orlando.

=== WFTT-TV: UniMás and Scientology Network ===
On December 4, 2017, as part of a multi-market realignment, the programming and call signs of WVEA-TV and sister station WFTT were swapped: WVEA-TV and its Univision programming moved to the Univision-owned digital channel 47 and virtual channel 50 facility, while Entravision's digital channel 25 and virtual channel 62 facility became the new home of UniMás affiliate WFTT-TV. After the Entravision agreement concluded at the end of 2021, Univision assumed control of WVEA and WVEN-TV in Orlando effective January 1, 2022.

In 2022, Entravision entered into a local marketing agreement with the Church of Scientology to program WFTT-TV. The church, through the Sunset Boulevard Broadcasting Corporation, agreed to buy WFTT-TV for $30 million in November 2026.

== Technical information ==
=== Subchannels ===
WFTT-TV's transmitter is located in Riverview, Florida. The station's signal is multiplexed:

Subchannels of WFTT-TV
| Subchannel | Res. | Short name | Programming |
|---|---|---|---|
| 62.1 | 720p | SCNTV | Scientology Network |
| 62.2 | 480i | LATV | LATV |
| 62.3 | 480i | Comet | Comet |
| 62.4 | 480i | ROAR | Roar |
| 62.7 | 480i | JTV | Jewelry TV |

What was then WVEA-TV began broadcasting a digital signal on February 1, 2003, on channel 25. It shut off its analog signal early on February 17, 2009, the original digital television transition date. The station's digital signal remained on its pre-transition UHF channel 25, using virtual channel 62.
