= KIWB =

KIWB may refer to:

- KIWB-LD, a low-power television station (channel 29, virtual 43) licensed to Boise, Idaho, United States
- KIWB (The CW Plus) (CW 10), a cable and digital television station in Chico, California, United States
