= WOPX-TV =

Television station in Melbourne, Florida

- Melbourne–Orlando, Florida; United States
- City: Melbourne, Florida
- Channels: Digital: 14 (UHF); Virtual: 56

Programming
- Affiliations: 56.1: Ion Television; for others, see § Subchannels

Ownership
- Owner: Ion Media; (Ion Media License Company, LLC)

History
- First air date: May 19, 1986
- Former call signs: WAYK (1986–1992); WIRB (1992–1998)
- Former channel numbers: Analog: 56 (UHF, 1986–2009); Digital: 48 (UHF, until 2020)
- Former affiliations: Independent (1985–1990, 1991–1995); STN (1990–1991); inTV (1995–1998)
- Call sign meaning: Orlando's Pax TV

Technical information
- Licensing authority: FCC
- Facility ID: 67602
- ERP: 419 kW
- HAAT: 536.6 m (1,760 ft)
- Transmitter coordinates: 28°16′45.3″N 81°1′24″W

Links
- Public license information: Public file; LMS
- Website: iontelevision.com

WOPX-TV (channel 56) is a television station licensed to Melbourne, Florida, United States, broadcasting the Ion Television network to the Orlando area. Owned by the Ion Media subsidiary of the E. W. Scripps Company, the station broadcasts from a transmitter located on Nova Road east of St. Cloud.

After its original permittee could not secure funding for construction, channel 56 began broadcasting on May 19, 1986, as WAYK. It was an independent station focusing on the Melbourne and Vero Beach area with an emphasis on sports programs, including baseball. An attempt to boost its viewership by merging with channel 26 in Daytona Beach failed to get the station on cable television systems in the Orlando area. Never financially successful, it filed for bankruptcy reorganization in 1990. During the process, the Daytona Beach station went off the air and was split off in bankruptcy court. Robert Rich, who had already been managing the station, bought it and changed its call sign to WIRB. As WAYK and again as WIRB, the station attempted producing a local newscast for Brevard and Indian River counties.

Christian Network, associated with Paxson Communications Corporation, bought WIRB in 1995 and replaced its programming with infomercials. Like other Paxson stations, it was one of the launch stations for the Pax network—forerunner to today's Ion—in 1998.

== History ==
=== WAYK: Construction and early years ===
In January 1981, Don Sundquist, owner of Broadcast Production and Management Corporation, announced his plans to apply to the Federal Communications Commission (FCC) to activate channel 56 in Melbourne. Sundquist proposed a format emphasizing business news programming; he owned a company called Market Report, which was already airing such a show over WKID-TV in Fort Lauderdale. A second application was filed by a Chattanooga, Tennessee, woman, but the FCC held a comparative hearing and awarded Sundquist's group the construction permit in September 1982. At the time, Sundquist declared plans to launch the station in 1983. While the full-power user of channel 56 was being determined, the channel was used by WESH to rebroadcast its signal into southern Brevard County, where reception had sometimes been poor.

By 1984, Sundquist had given up on building the station and another permit he owned in Key West, Florida. The early 1980s recession had caused a potential financier of the venture to go out of business, television networks were uninterested in offering affiliation, and he could not secure funding from banks. He attempted to sell the station—designated WSCT—to the SFN Companies, which had just acquired Orlando station WFTV and hoped to use it as a satellite station with local news inserts. The transaction fell through when ABC denied WFTV permission to rebroadcast its signal.

In 1985, William Varecha assumed control of the channel 56 permit. He planned to focus the station on Brevard and Indian River counties, which he felt were underserved by the nearest television stations. Construction was delayed multiple times in late 1985 and early 1986 as the venture faced studio construction delays, short legs on one section of the 1,000-foot (300 m) tower, and a faulty transmission line.

WAYK made its first broadcast on May 19, 1986, days after WESH discontinued its use of the South Brevard translator. A local news program debuted shortly after the station's first broadcast.

Varecha's plans for channel 56 were complicated by Melbourne's other television station, WMOD (channel 43). WMOD, unlike WAYK, sought to penetrate the Orlando television market. In 1985, it won an FCC ruling declaring Brevard County to be part of the Orlando television market. This had a negative effect on WAYK, because it forced the station to compete for programming at higher rates and without the signal coverage that WMOD had. WAYK's transmitter, near the Indian River–Brevard line, was further south than that of WMOD. Varecha went as far as petitioning the FCC to reverse the previous FCC ruling. One of the ways WAYK tried to compensate for this difficulty, as well as its lack of presence on Orlando-area cable systems, was by investing in syndicated sports. In 1987, the station scheduled telecasts of some 200 Major League Baseball games, as well as several syndicated college sports packages. While most Orlando-area cable systems, particularly the large CableVision of Central Florida, shunned WAYK, the sports programming got it on the smaller Storer Cable system in southern Seminole County.

=== Simulcast with WAYQ ===
In December 1987, Varecha's TV 56 Limited agreed to share ownership of WAYK with Life Style Broadcasting, which held a construction permit for channel 26 in Daytona Beach. The two firms formed Beach Television Partners. The combination of channels 26 and 56 was expected by management to create a large signal covering the full Orlando media market. Channel 26 began broadcasting as WAYQ on September 12, 1988. Shortly after debuting, Orlando-based independent station WOFL objected to channel 26's license, claiming that advertisers were told the WAYQ signal reached Orlando when it did not.

Not long after the simulcast began, WAYK—which owned half of WAYQ—began to fail financially. The largest cable system in the Orlando area, CableVision of Central Florida, never added WAYK–WAYQ to its lineup on a full-time basis, straining the station's ability to secure advertising revenue. WAYK president Bill Varecha told Florida Today in July 1990, "We have been unable to act as a conventional television station because we can't disseminate over the entire area. Orlando is the meat and potatoes of the marketplace." In 1989, the news department was discontinued to cut costs; interest in channel 56's local news had been low in the Vero Beach area. One stockholder in the company, Harry Handley, started the Star Television Network, which proposed to deliver classic TV shows and infomercials to affiliates including WAYK and WAYQ. In the meantime, Beach Television Partners began seeking investors to assist in providing capital to the struggling stations; on the WAYK side, Robert Rich—former owner of KBJR-TV in Duluth, Minnesota—stepped in as a new manager. After lenders refused to give the company more time to make payments on broadcast equipment, in August 1990, Beach Television Partners filed for Chapter 11 bankruptcy protection. Two months later, Barnett Bank moved to foreclose on the studios after the Varechas defaulted on a construction loan.

WAYK and WAYQ continued to broadcast while in bankruptcy. During this time, the Star Television Network operated, with the two stations among its few affiliates, before running out of cash and ceasing operations in January 1991. WAYQ ceased broadcasting on June 26, 1991, when a Grumman A-6 Intruder of the United States Navy clipped its tower.

=== WIRB ===
In August 1991, the Chapter 11 bankruptcy case was converted to a Chapter 7 liquidation. WAYK was allowed to continue telecasting in order to preserve the FCC license, one of its principal assets. The bankruptcy court appointed a trustee, who moved to separate WAYQ and WAYK.

Under the company Treasure Coast Communications, Robert Rich bought WAYK for $100,000. The station changed call signs to WIRB on May 22, 1992. The rebranded station continued as an independent outlet, adding several daytime shows local network affiliates did not clear and a schedule of 52 games of the expansion Florida Marlins baseball team.

During this time, WIRB began building toward the resumption of local news programming for Brevard and Indian River counties. An evening newscast debuted in July 1993. It coincided with the return of must-carry laws, which put WIRB on cable systems in Orlando and Kissimmee for the first time and expanded its reach.

=== Paxson and Ion ownership ===
Christian Network, Inc., announced a $4 million acquisition of WIRB from Rich in January 1995. The news department was laid off on January 16, 1995, in preparation for a transition to the station's new programming: infomercials. The new owner and programming were closely related. The infomercials came from the Infomall TV network, owned by Paxson Communications Corporation, of which WIRB was the first separately owned affiliate; Paxson was one of the largest contributors to Christian Network. During this time, WIRB occasionally broke away from infomercials. The cable channel America's Health Network brokered some overnight hours to air its shows; the Orlando-based service lacked cable carriage in its hometown. In December 1997, an independently produced local Spanish-language newscast began airing on WIRB.

In January 1998, WIRB became WOPX-TV as part of a national changeover of dozens of Paxson-owned stations' call signs. Paxson's Infomall TV stations changed programming with the launch of the Pax network on August 31, 1998. Beginning in 2002, regional NBC affiliate WESH sold advertising time on WOPX-TV under a joint sales agreement; in addition, WOPX added replays of WESH newscasts to its schedule and began operating out of WESH's studio facilities.

After canceling all of its joint sales agreements and changing its name to i: Independent Television in 2005, the network became known as Ion Television in 2007. The E. W. Scripps Company acquired Ion Media for $2.65 billion in 2020.

== Technical information ==
=== Subchannels ===
WOPX-TV's transmitter is located on Nova Road east of St. Cloud. The station's signal is multiplexed:

Subchannels of WOPX-TV
Subchannel	Res.	Short name	Programming
56.1	720p	ION	Ion Television
56.2	720p	Bounce	Bounce TV
56.3	480i	CourtTV	Court TV
56.4	480i	IONPlus	Ion Plus
56.5	480i	BUSTED	Busted
56.6	480i	GameSho	Game Show Central
56.7	480i	QVC	QVC
56.8	480i	HSN	HSN

=== Analog-to-digital conversion ===
WOPX-TV shut down its analog signal, over UHF channel 56, on June 12, 2009, the official date on which full-power television stations in the United States transitioned from analog to digital broadcasts under federal mandate. The station's digital signal continued to broadcast on its pre-transition UHF channel 48, using virtual channel 56.
