= Ariel & Zoey & Eli, Too =

Three real-life siblings, Ariel, Zoey and Elijah Engelbert, consist the group called "Ariel, Zoey & Eli". Ariel and Zoey are identical twin sisters born in 1998 (26–27 years old) while Elijah was born in 2001 (23–24 years old). As of January 2018, the siblings earned a Facebook fanbase approaching 3,000,000 where their videos had been viewed over 100 million times. In 2015, the siblings received a Daytime Emmy nomination in the category: "Outstanding Original Song", becoming the youngest-ever to receive a nomination in that category.

The siblings earn two TV shows. First, Ariel & Zoey & Eli, Too, is a nationally syndicated children's musical variety program. The show entered syndication in September 2010. Guests appearing on the show include Kevin Costner, Miranda Cosgrove and "American Idol" runner-up David Archuleta.

In Summer 2012, Ariel, Zoey and Eli were introduced to Jim Peterik. Peterik is the Grammy Award-winning songwriter ("Eye of the Tiger", "Vehicle", "The Search is Over"), had composed a new song about anti-bullying titled "Hey Bully!" and asked the siblings to record it. Over the following three months, the quartet recorded "Hey Bully!" and during that time, a new TV show, "Steal the Show" (a reality show following the quartet recording more new songs) would enter in production.

Networks/stations recently airing both Ariel & Zoey & Eli, Too and Steal the Show include NBC's owned-and-operated stations via Cozi TV, WTVS Detroit, WGTE-TV Toledo and ZUUS Country.
