= KTSB =

KTSB may refer to:

- KTSB-CD, a television station (channel 35) licensed to serve Santa Maria, California, United States
- KOTV (AM), a radio station (1170 kHz) licensed to serve Tulsa, Oklahoma, United States, which used the KTSB call letters from 2021 to 2024
- KSNT, a television station in Topeka, Kansas, United States, which used the KTSB call letters from 1967 to 1982
