= Star Television Network =

Failed American television network

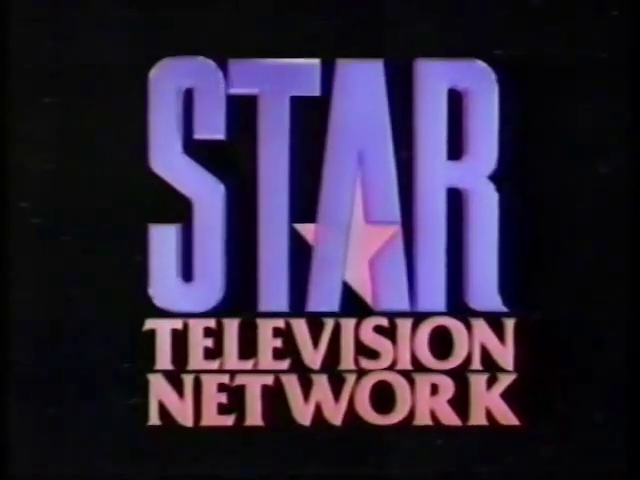
- Type: Broadcast television network
- Country: United States
- Broadcast area: Nationwide
- Affiliates: See § Known affiliates
- Headquarters: Orlando, Florida

Ownership
- Owner: Harry Handley, Walter Windsor, Cathy Bamberg, and John Tyler (1987-1989); Lang Communications (1989-1991)
- Parent: Star Television Network, Inc.
- Key people: Harry Handley, Walter Windsor, Cathy Bamberg, and John Tyler (Principals); Dale W. Lang (Replacement investor & Chairman); Ron Eikens (Chief Executive Officer)

History
- Founded: 1987; 39 years ago
- Launched: September 29, 1990
- Founder: Harry Handley & Cathy Bamberg (President & Vice President, respectively, of Bamberg-Handley, Inc.); Walter Windsor; John Tyler (President of Satellite Music Network, Inc.)
- Closed: January 14, 1991 (3 months and 16 days)

The Star Television Network (commonly branded as Starcast initially, then STN, prior to launch, then Star from its launch up to the network's shutdown), was an attempt, though unsuccessful, at an Orlando, Florida-based fifth national, major, over-the-air American television network after NBC, CBS, ABC, and Fox (the "big four"). It was notable as the first television network to have featured exclusively direct response commercials and infomercials among standard programming.

Star featured classic, though cheaper and lesser-known, 1950s and 1960s programming, movies and game shows under the TV Heaven slogan, with direct response infomercials rounding out the schedule. The network expected to buy newer programs and originate its own once it became fully-established.

Star was facing competition from the Home Shopping Network and Fox, which went after the bigger markets. In light of this, the network explained that its key advantage is in terms of operating costs for the station, in which a station affiliating with the network could save about 90% on their programming costs, and a national advertiser advertising on the network could pay about 68% of the major network rates.

== History ==
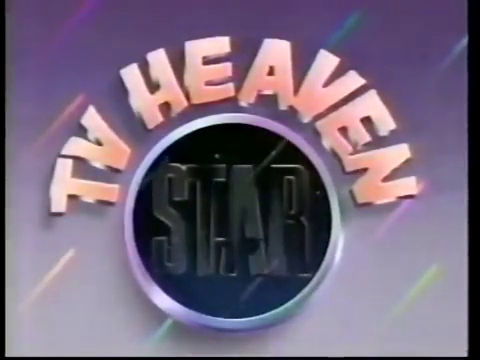
Star Television Network TV Heaven logo

The network was introduced under the Starcast branding in October 1987 by network founders Harry Handley, Walter Windsor, Cathy Bamberg, and John Tyler as needing $15 million to launch and had just started contacting potential affiliates. The network expected to sign up 30 stations by the April 1989 launch date and broadcast 18 hours of programming per day. After the Black Monday stock market crash in October 1987, Starcast's investors pulled out. By January 1988, the company had 70 stations willing to sign on to the network.

By April 1989 (the projected launch date), the network, now under the STN branding (having changed from Starcast), pushed back their launch to July due to programming negotiations and financing hold ups. 64 stations had provisionally signed on as affiliates in markets like Los Angeles, Chicago, Philadelphia, Boston, Jacksonville, Florida and Orlando to an estimated reach of 40 million households. The network was then in talks with an additional 33 stations. At this time, an affiliation fee ranging from $2,750 to $60,000 annually would be paid by the stations based on their market size instead of the standard network payments to affiliates. 36 minutes a day would be allocated for advertising sold by the network, with the remainder given to its affiliates. STN missed the July launch due to lack of additional funding and set a new September 1 deadline for enough affiliates to sign on for a possible November 1 launch. The network expected to be based at the then-new Universal Studios Florida in Orlando. At this time, the network restructured its affiliate agreement in dropping the annual carriage fee for the addition of some infomercials and a refundable deposit of $1,500 to $175,000 based on the station's size. The number of affiliates at launch and infomercials was a requirement to bring on replacement investor Dale W. Lang, owner of Lang Communications, which then owned several magazines including Success and Working Woman magazine. The infomercials would bring a steady source of income for the network and were mostly to be provided by Quantum Marketing International.

Missing the September 1, 1989 affiliate total deadline, the network, under the Star branding (its second and final name change), pushed back its launch to September 1990. As of August 12, 1990, there were 21 signed stations reaching 13.7 million households. Also, Star moved operations to a rented studio in Winter Park, Florida. Additionally, broadcasting hours were reduced to 8 hours a day, plus 4 hours of infomercials. The network expected to have revenue reach $100 million in its second year of operations. By July 1990, Star had been granted a federal permit for a station in Austin, Minnesota.

Star launched on September 29, 1990 with 10 affiliates reaching 9 million homes, as the additional stations were not ready or failed to receive FCC approval. With fewer stations, the network sold less through the infomercials, thus not meeting company goals. The infomercial companies were having their own problems, and thus unable to produce newer shows. Lang could not add more funding into the company due to difficulties at Lang Communications. Lang and the company sought out other investors, to no avail.

Star ceased operations on Monday, January 14, 1991, at 4:00 a.m. EST. All 25 staffers working for the network were laid off.

== Aftermath ==
A year before Star's launch in 1990, another "fifth" network, as well as "major" network, attempt was made with the "Premier Program Service" (PPS), a joint venture between MCA Inc. and Paramount Communications, with stations owned by Paramount's TVX Broadcast Group and MCA's WWOR-TV as charter outlets. The network was set to launch in 1991. It was in early 1990 that MCA and Paramount approached certain Fox stations with PPS affiliate deals. However, when Fox objected to the solicitations, the network was scrapped.

After Star's shutdown, yet another attempt at both a viable fifth television network, as well as a "major" network, would be made in 1993, when the Warner Bros. Domestic Television Distribution subsidiary of Time Warner would partner with the BHC Communications subsidiary of Chris-Craft Industries to launch the Prime Time Entertainment Network (PTEN). However, both Warner Bros. & Chris-Craft would abandon PTEN in late 1993 to focus on launching their own respective joint venture TV networks. PTEN network would eventually cease operations in 1995. It would also be in that year that two new viable fifth television networks, as well as "major" networks, would be launched by both of PTEN's parent companies: Warner Bros. would partner with the Tribune Broadcasting subsidiary of the Tribune Company to launch The WB Television Network, and, the United Television subsidiary of Chris-Craft would partner with the Paramount Television subsidiary of Viacom to launch the United Paramount Network (UPN). After launch, both The WB and UPN would compete with Fox, though neither managed to reach "major" network status.

Both The WB and UPN would eventually be replaced in 2006 by The CW, another viable fifth major television network joint venture between CBS Corporation (successor to the original Viacom and eventual full owner of UPN) and Warner Bros. While The CW has managed to gain 100% broadcast coverage (Note: See The CW#Stations for information/details), viewership is what currently prevents The CW from attaining "major" network status. Meanwhile, with the launch of The CW in 2006, News Corporation, then the parent company of Fox, would take its stations formerly affiliated with UPN and use them to launch in 2006 what then was the newest sixth television network, MyNetworkTV (though, MyNetworkTV has never managed to gain "major" network status). However, by 2009, amidst poor ratings and viewership, MyNetworkTV would transition from a television network to a broadcast syndication service.

== Programming ==
Star's schedule was of four hours of infomercials and eight hours of classic shows under the TV Heaven slogan. Some of the programs known to have aired on Star included:

- The Invaders
- The Life of Riley
- My Little Margie
- The Rebel

Honey West, Judge Roy Bean, Mr. and Mrs. North, and Richard Diamond, Private Detective were also announced as part of Star's line-up in August 1988, though it was unknown if these series had aired.

Infomercials are listed in schedules under various names, such as Star Showcase, Star Opportunities, Star Collections, Star Sensations, Star Innovations, Market Place, Morning Star and Direct to You.

As with other networks, affiliates fill the rest of the time with their own local and syndicated programming, as well as sports, which would preempt Star programming.

== Known affiliates ==
- WAYK channel 56, Melbourne, Florida, Beach TV Partners
  - WAYQ channel 26, Daytona Beach, Florida Beach TV Partners; satellite of WAYK
- W48AP channel 48, Toledo, Ohio
- KXLI channel 41, St. Cloud, Minnesota, KXLI Acquisition Corp (owned by Dale W. Lang, Star Television Network owner via Lang Communications)
  - KXLT-TV channel 47, Rochester, Minnesota (KXLI satellite), KXLI Acquisition Corp (owned by Dale W. Lang, Star Television Network owner via Lang Communications)
- WPAN channel 53, Fort Walton Beach, Florida, owned by John Franklin Ministries
- W25AI channel 25, Cincinnati, Ohio, owned by Block Communications
- KDMD channel 33, Anchorage, Alaska
- KLXV channel 65, San Francisco, California
- KHFT channel 29, Albuquerque, New Mexico
- KBLR channel 39, Las Vegas, Nevada
- KOOG channel 30, Ogden–Salt Lake City, Utah
- WYED channel 17, Goldsboro, North Carolina
- KBGE channel 33, Seattle, Washington
- KKAK channel 61, Fresno, California
- WOCD channel 55, Albany, New York

The following stations signed up as affiliates of the network, but did not commence broadcasting until after the network's closure in January 1991:

- WBSV, channel 62, Venice / Sarasota, Florida; signed on in May 1991
- WTTA channel 38, St. Petersburg / Tampa, Florida; signed on in June 1991
- KSKN channel 22, Spokane, Washington; station had gone dark in 1987 and did not return to air until 1994
- WNHT channel 21, Concord, New Hampshire, and WPHX Boston; the sale of both stations to Rogue Television Corp. fell through, along with the WPHX call letters for then-WHRC, and the stations did not return to air until 1995 and 1996
- KJLF channel 65, El Paso, Texas; signed on in June 1991
- WWLA channel 35, Portland, Maine; signed on in 1997
- KZAR channel 16, Provo, Utah; signed on in 1998

One announced affiliate never broadcast:

- KCVF channel 40, Portland, Oregon
