= WTNC-LD =

Television station in Raleigh, North Carolina

Translator of WUVC-DT, Fayetteville, North Carolina

- Raleigh, North Carolina; United States
- Channels: Digital: 11 (VHF); Virtual: 26
- Branding: UniMás Raleigh

Programming
- Affiliations: 26.1: UniMás; 26.2: Univision; for others, see § Subchannels

Ownership
- Owner: TelevisaUnivision; (WUVC License Partnership, G.P.)
- Sister stations: WUVC-DT

History
- Founded: March 7, 1995
- First air date: January 9, 1997
- Former call signs: W59CR (1997); WIWW-LP (1997–2003); WTNC-LP (2003–2010)
- Former channel numbers: Analog: 59 (UHF, 1997–1998), 26 (UHF, 1998–2010); Digital: 19 (UHF, 2010–2020)
- Call sign meaning: Telefutura North Carolina

Technical information
- Licensing authority: FCC
- Facility ID: 70112
- Class: LD
- ERP: 3 kW
- HAAT: 107.7 m (353 ft)
- Transmitter coordinates: 36°3′33.3″N 78°57′10.2″W
- Translator(s): WUVC-DT 40.2 Fayetteville

Links
- Public license information: LMS

WTNC-LD (channel 26) is a low-power television station licensed to Raleigh, North Carolina, United States, broadcasting the Spanish-language UniMás network to the Research Triangle region. It is owned and operated by TelevisaUnivision alongside Fayetteville-licensed Univision station WUVC-DT (channel 40). The two stations share studios on Falls of Neuse Road in Raleigh; WTNC-LD's transmitter is located on Rose of Sharon Road in Durham.

Although WTNC-LD identifies as a separate station in its own right, it is officially licensed as a translator of WUVC-DT. In addition to its own digital signal, WTNC-LD is simulcast in high definition on WUVC-DT's second digital subchannel (40.2) from a transmitter northeast of Broadway, North Carolina. WUVC-DT, in turn, is simulcast on WTNC-LD's second digital subchannel.

== History ==
Former logo (2002-2013)

The station originally signed on in early 1997 as W59CR from a tower near the corner of NC 98 and US 70 By-Pass in East Durham. Broadcasting then on channel 59, the station rebroadcast WACN-LP (channel 34) from Apex, a Christian TV station. The call letters changed to WIWW-LP in late 1997.

When WUNC-TV needed UHF channel 59 for digital, WIWW vacated the channel for UHF 26 on the WNCU tower off Rose of Sharon Road in northwest Durham. It was home shopping for a while, then dark, then Telefutura (now UniMás).

In 2007, WTNC began simulcasting as a digital subchannel of sister station WUVC-TV in Fayetteville and other southern regions of the viewing area. In 2010, WTNC switched to digital broadcasting.

== Subchannels ==
Subchannels of WUVC-DT and WTNC-LD
| Subchannel | | Res. | Short name | Programming |
| WUVC-DT | WTNC-LD | Res. | Short name | Programming |
|---|---|---|---|---|
| 40.1 | 26.2 | 720p | WUVC-DT | Univision |
| 40.2 | 26.1 | 720p | UNIMAS | UniMás |
| 40.3 | 26.3 | 480i | Confess | Confess |
| 40.4 | 26.4 | 480i | GetTV | Great (4:3) |
| 40.5 | 26.5 | 480i | Laff | Laff |
| 40.6 | 26.6 | 480i | Quest | Quest |
| 40.7 | 26.7 | 480i | MSGold | MovieSphere Gold |
| 40.8 | 26.8 | 480i | BT2 | Infomercials |

Subchannel broadcast with MPEG-4 video
