= Channel 46 digital TV stations in the United States =

The following television stations broadcast on digital channel 46 in the United States:

- K46KI-D in Woody Creek, Colorado, to move to channel 14

The following stations, which are no longer licensed, formerly broadcast on digital channel 46 in the United States:

- K46BY-D in Capulin, etc., New Mexico
- K46FB-D in Austin, Nevada
- K46HW-D in Preston, Idaho
- K46MX-D in Lowry, South Dakota
- KHLU-CD in Honolulu, Hawaii
- KMKI-LD in Cedar Falls, Iowa
- W46AX-D in Bryson City, North Carolina
- W46EO-D in Culebra, Puerto Rico
- W46IT-D in Port Henry, New York
- WQVC-CD in Greensburg, Pennsylvania
- WUEM-LD in Athens, Georgia
- WWEK-LD in Augusta, Georgia
