= The Country Network =

American digital multicast network

- Type: Streaming television network
- Country: United States
- Broadcast area: Nationwide
- Headquarters: Haltom City, Texas

Ownership
- Owner: TCN Country, LLC

History
- Launched: January 7, 2009
- Former names: Artists & Fans Network (2009); American Music Video Network (2009–2010); ZUUS Country (2013–2016)

Links
- Website: tcncountry.com

The Country Network is an American streaming television network that specializes in broadcasting country music videos and exclusive original music-based content; its playlist of videos extends from the 1990s through the present day. The network also airs occasional infomercials and traditional advertising.

The network is headquartered in Haltom City, Texas, with offices in Nashville, Tennessee, and New York.

== History ==
The network first launched on January 7, 2009, as the Artists & Fans Network; the music video that inaugurated the network was the Kid Rock video "All Summer Long". AFN was first carried on satellite through DirecTV on channel 236.

In August 2009, after suffering from financial problems, Southern Venture Capital Group sold all the assets of the company to one of the founders, Warren Hansen, who then changed its name to the American Music Video Network, and rolled out the programming with a new look and feel. On February 15, 2010, the company was renamed The Country Network to represent its focus on country music. Around this time, The Country Network began to transition into a digital multicast network, carried over-the-air on broadcast television stations across the United States as well as the first broadcast network to simulcast to Roku, iPhone, iPad, web, and other OTT outlets.

On May 20, 2013, Zuus Media announced its acquisition of The Country Network. On June 1, 2013, Zuus Media announced the rebranding as Zuus Country. Zuus Country was to be the first of several music video networks of various formats. Only one of these other formats, Zuus Latino, ever made it to air.

In January 2016, the network was purchased by a Texas-based company, TCN Country LLC, with a 43,000-square-foot studio, production and broadcast facility. TCN Country changed the brand back to The Country Network, reviving its original name and logo for the revival of the network.

In 2021, The Country Network, after having previously placed its online Web stream behind a paywall, launched TCN FAST (Free Advertising Supported Television), a free online feed of the channel that is distributed through advertiser-supported over-the-top streaming services.

== Affiliates ==
As of 2013, Zuus Country has television stations in over 41 television markets in 26 states, covering approximately 34 million over the air households an 18 million cable subscribers. ZUUS Country (at the time, still named The Country Network) signed a deal with Sinclair Broadcast Group in August 2010 to be carried on digital subchannels of Sinclair stations in most of its media markets; the network began airing on Sinclair owned and/or operated stations on October 10, 2010. After Sinclair's original drop of several affiliates in late 2015, the network was down to 24 markets (The contract with Sinclair was expired in June 2017). When TCN Country LLC purchased the network, they immediately started growing the distribution and as of January 30, 2017 the network was up to 54 markets along with the launch of a Roku channel and a slot on smart TVs manufactured by Hitachi and Panasonic.

As of 2019, most of The Country Network's affiliates were low-powered stations controlled by HC2 Holdings or its subsidiary DTV America.

As of 2026, The Country Network was no longer carried on any TV stations; as a result, it launched an internet livestream through its website.

Former affiliates of The Country Network
Media market	State/Territory	Station	Channel
Bakersfield	California	KCBT-LD	34.5
Fresno	California	KMSG-LD	39.5
Los Angeles	California	KFLA-LD	8
Monterey	California	KMBY-LD	27.6
Sacramento	California	KSAO-LD	49.7
San Francisco	California	KCNZ-CD	28.15
Orlando	Florida	WRCF-CD	29.4
Atlanta	Georgia	WDWW-LD	28
Boise	Idaho	KZAK-LD	49.3
Fort Wayne	Indiana	WLMO-LD	2.4
Des Moines	Iowa	KCYM-LD	45.2
Sublette	Kansas	KDGL-LD	23.4
Topeka	Kansas	KSQA	12
Bowling Green	Kentucky	WDNZ-LD	11.3
Joplin	Missouri	KPJO-LD	49.5
Kansas City	Missouri	KAJF-LD	21
Charlotte	North Carolina	WVEB-LD	40.2
Durham	North Carolina	WUBX-CD	31
Oklahoma City	Oklahoma	KTOU-LD	21.5
Ceiba	Puerto Rico	W18DZ-D	18.2
Nashville	Tennessee	WJDE-CD	31.2
Amarillo	Texas	KAUO-LD	15
Austin	Texas	KADF-LD	20.2
Dallas	Texas	KJJM-LD	34.7
Houston	Texas	KBPX-LD	46.6
Waco	Texas	KZCZ-LD	34
