= WOTF-TV =

Television station in Daytona Beach, Florida, US

- Daytona Beach–Orlando, Florida; United States
- City: Daytona Beach, Florida
- Channels: Digital: 15 (UHF); Virtual: 26
- Branding: WAPA Orlando; NotiCentro Orlando (newscasts)

Programming
- Affiliations: 26.1: WAPA Orlando; for others, see § Subchannels

Ownership
- Owner: Entravision Communications; (Entravision Holdings, LLC)
- Operator: WAPA Media Group

History
- First air date: September 12, 1988
- Former call signs: WLSY (February–December 1987); WAYQ (December 1987–1996); WNTO (1996–2000); WVEN-TV (2000–2017)
- Former channel numbers: Analog: 26 (UHF, 1988–2009); Digital: 49 (UHF, 2003–2020)
- Former affiliations: Independent (1988–1990, 1991); Star TV (1990–1991); National Empowerment Television/America's Voice (1996–2001); Univision (2001–2017); UniMás (2017–2021); Grit (2021–2026)
- Call sign meaning: Orlando Telefutura (former name of UniMás), from a 2017 call sign swap

Technical information
- Licensing authority: FCC
- Facility ID: 131
- ERP: 130 kW
- HAAT: 428 m (1,404 ft)
- Transmitter coordinates: 28°55′11.1″N 81°19′6.6″W

Links
- Public license information: Public file; LMS
- Website: wapaorlando.com

WOTF-TV (channel 26) is a Spanish-language independent television station licensed to Daytona Beach, Florida, United States, serving the Orlando area. Owned by Entravision Communications, it is operated by WAPA Media Group and has a transmitter near Orange City, Florida.

Channel 26 began broadcasting as WAYQ on September 12, 1988. After a years-long comparative hearing process that featured seven applicants, original owner Life Style Broadcasting entered into an agreement to share ownership and programming with WAYK (channel 56) in Melbourne. The intention of the combination of the two stations was to put a signal into the full Orlando media market, but WAYQ's signal did not fully reach Orlando, and it was never added to Orlando's cable system. This caused financial difficulty for the joint owner of WAYQ and WAYK, Beach Television Partners, which filed for bankruptcy protection in August 1990. On June 26, 1991, a United States Navy jet on a training mission clipped the station's tower at Pierson, taking WAYQ off the air. A lengthy claims process with the Navy and the loss of advertising revenue led to the appointment of a trustee for the two stations and their sale to separate companies.

WAYQ was bought out of bankruptcy by James McCotter and returned in 1996 as WNTO, whose primary programming source was the National Empowerment Television conservative talk channel. The station also aired Tampa Bay Devil Rays baseball in the Orlando market, but attempts at higher-profile programming failed to materialize. The station was sold to Entravision in 2000 and switched to Univision in 2001, essentially upgrading the former WVEN-LP to full-power status. In 2017, Univision moved the network programming and WVEN-TV call letters to its own transmitter on channel 43, but Entravision continued to operate both stations until the end of 2021, when channel 26 lost its programming from UniMás. After airing the Grit network on its main channel, in 2026 WOTF began airing "WAPA Orlando", which airs original programming from WAPA-TV in Puerto Rico.

== History ==
=== Construction ===
Channel 26 in Daytona Beach began to attract interest from potential operators as early as 1978, when Springfield Television announced its intentions to file for the channel as an independent station. Springfield never filed, and the channel had no applications for it until Comark Television of Southwick, Massachusetts, applied for channel 26 in December 1979. Comark, a transmitter and antenna manufacturer, was making a foray into station ownership.

Comark's filing triggered a stampede of competing applications, seven in all by the time the Federal Communications Commission (FCC) designated a comparative hearing in July 1981. Two consisted primarily of local ownership: Daytona Beach Television, headed by state senator Edgar Dunn, and Life Style Broadcasting, led by former Daytona Beach city commissioner Lee Cook. Two others had ownership interests in other Florida stations: Daytona Broadcasting Company—owned by the Kupris family, which owned a TV station in Panama City—and WTWV, Inc., owned by Frank Spain alongside WTVA in Tupelo, Mississippi, and CBS affiliate WTVX in Fort Pierce. This application, unlike the others, specified a CBS affiliate based in nearby New Smyrna Beach. The other three applicants were from out of state: Comark; Daytona Beach Family Television, primarily consisting of ownership interests from Nashville, Tennessee; and Metrovision, Inc., a Black-owned broadcasting firm from Stamford, Connecticut.

Issues in the hearing primarily centered around comparative criteria such as integration of ownership and management as well as the technical question of finding a transmitter site that met a 205-mile (330 km) distance requirement to WEVU in Naples, also on channel 26. After the hearing, Metrovision dropped out because it felt pursuing the application would be too expensive, while WTWV and Comark cited disadvantages their firms held in the comparative field.

In April 1983, FCC administrative law judge John M. Frysiak issued an initial decision favoring a merger of Daytona Beach Television and Daytona Beach Family Television for the license. The losing contenders, Life Style Broadcasting and Daytona Broadcasting Company, challenged the ruling before the FCC review board. The board overturned the initial decision and awarded the channel to Life Style because of its superior coverage proposal and more diverse ownership. The proceeding languished until June 1986, when the parties reached a joint settlement agreement granting the construction permit to Life Style.

=== WAYQ: Simulcast of WAYK ===
Life Style intended to construct the station by mid-1987, but no action was taken until December 1987, when Life Style signed an affiliation agreement to simulcast WAYK (channel 56) in Melbourne and sold it to a partnership of Life Style and WAYK ownership known as Beach Television Partners. The combination of channels 26 and 56 was expected by management to create a large signal covering the full Orlando media market. Tower construction began in April 1988; Volusia County granted a special exemption in spite of protests by pilots that visual flight rules aircraft traffic near the site had grown considerably since the original 1981 authorization.

Channel 26 began broadcasting as WAYQ on September 12, 1988. It served to rebroadcast nearly all of WAYK's programming; at the time, the station's programming specialty was sports, including syndicated college basketball and more than 200 baseball games a year. Shortly after debuting, Orlando-based independent station WOFL objected to channel 26's license, claiming that advertisers were told the WAYQ signal reached Orlando when it did not.

Not long after the simulcast began, WAYK—which owned half of WAYQ—began to fail financially. The largest cable system in the Orlando area, CableVision of Central Florida, never added WAYK–WAYQ to its lineup on a full-time basis, straining the station's ability to secure advertising revenue. WAYK president Bill Varecha told Florida Today in July 1990, "We have been unable to act as a conventional television station because we can't disseminate over the entire area. Orlando is the meat and potatoes of the marketplace." One stockholder in the company, Harry Handley, started the Star Television Network, which proposed to deliver classic TV shows and infomercials to affiliates including WAYK and WAYQ. In the meantime, Beach Television Partners began seeking investors to assist in providing capital to the struggling stations; on the WAYK side, Robert Rich—former owner of KBJR-TV in Duluth, Minnesota—stepped in as a new manager. After lenders refused to give the company more time to make payments on broadcast equipment, in August 1990, Beach Television Partners filed for Chapter 11 bankruptcy protection.

WAYK and WAYQ continued to broadcast while in bankruptcy. During this time, the Star Television Network operated, with the two stations among its few affiliates, before running out of cash and ceasing operations in January 1991. WAYQ's time on air was soon cut short. On the evening of June 26, 1991, a United States Navy Grumman A-6 Intruder aircraft from Virginia Beach, Virginia, piloted by Michael Wettlaufer, clipped the tower near Pierson on a test run to the Ocala National Forest. It sheared the top beacon and top 10 feet (3 m) of the tower, causing the entire transmission line to short. Despite a damaged wing, the Intruder was able to land at Naval Air Station Cecil Field in Jacksonville with no injuries. Repairs at first moved slowly because the Navy required that the station obtain three bids for each phase of construction to satisfy its requirements for reimbursement. Losing WAYQ compounded Beach Television Partners's financial problems; the cost of repairs, estimated at $400,000 to $500,000, was dwarfed by the loss in advertising revenue to its operation, even as WAYK remained on the air. In August 1991, the Chapter 11 bankruptcy case was converted to a Chapter 7 liquidation, and the resumption of telecasting became contingent on the resolution of the bankruptcy case and the station's claim against the Navy. The bankruptcy court appointed a trustee, who moved to separate WAYQ and WAYK and sold the latter station to Robert Rich.

=== WNTO ===
In December 1992, James McCotter agreed to pay $35,000 for WAYQ's license. The tower site and property had been sold separately to the Union Camp Corporation, a prior owner, to satisfy a claim Union Camp held in the bankruptcy proceeding. McCotter had previously owned the Sun Newspapers chain of weeklies, which shut down in 1990 under financial stress.

McCotter rebuilt channel 26 on the same site in Pierson and returned it to the air in June 1996 as WNTO. The station's primary source of programming upon its return was National Empowerment Television, which aired conservative news and talk shows. It also aired some programming from the America One network. A particular highlight for Orlando-area viewers, beginning in 1998, were selected telecasts of the expansion Tampa Bay Devil Rays baseball team; these were the only games available to many Orlando households, as SportsChannel Florida was not carried locally.

Two attempts to raise WNTO's profile never came to fruition. In December 1997, it was announced that channel 26 would broadcast an independently produced Spanish-language newscast, to be called TV Noticias 26. The newscast never launched after a dispute between WNTO and the producers over payment for start-up costs. In August 1998, WNTO was announced as the local broadcast carrier for a new regional news channel, Florida's News Channel; while it planned to air via cable in most of the state, Time Warner Cable—owner of Central Florida News 13—was shutting it out as a standalone offering, leading to the plan to place the service on a broadcast station that cable already carried. The agreement with Florida's News Channel soon soured, and by December 1998, Florida's News Channel had sued licensee Florida Media Broadcasters for breach of contract. It accused WNTO of reneging on agreements by insisting on cash payments not provided for by the original contract; noting that Orlando was a crucial market, it alleged "irreparable harm" at losing its only gateway to Central Florida viewers. Florida's News Channel won a "hefty" out-of-court settlement but was never carried by WNTO, forcing the service to close its Orlando bureau and dismiss nearly a dozen employees.

=== WVEN-TV: Univision for Central Florida ===
Meanwhile, in Orlando, W63BH was authorized as a construction permit in December 1988 and began broadcasting in July 1992 from the tower of WCPX-TV as Orlando's Univision affiliate. It was owned by Bahía Honda, Inc. At the time the permit was obtained, the owners included José Cancela, vice president and general manager of Miami Univision station WLTV, and Joaquín Blaya, the president of Univision. By 1992, Cancela and Blaya had both defected to rival network Telemundo; Univision made repeated requests of Cancela and Blaya to divest their ownership in W63BH and W61BL in Tampa, threatening bad industry press for Telemundo as a result of Bahía Honda's owners "preferring" Univision for their own stations. W63BH offered a Spanish-language simulcast of WCPX's 6 p.m. newscast.

In 1995, Bahía Honda sold the Tampa and Orlando Univision low-power stations to Latin Communications Group, which up until then had primarily been a print media company, owning New York City's El Diario La Prensa. Channel 63 changed its call sign to WVEN-LP after the sale. Latin Communications Group merged with EXCL Communications, a Spanish-language radio company, in 1997.

EXCL merged with Entravision Communications Corporation in 2000. Entravision entered into an agreement to acquire WNTO from Florida Media Broadcasters; its offer was briefly threatened by a dispute with Barbara Laurence, who attempted to obtain a 10-percent stake in WNTO and WHCT-TV in Hartford, Connecticut, by alleging that she found the stations for Entravision. On March 1, 2001, the WVEN call sign and Univision programming moved from the low-power channel 63 to the full-power channel 26, increasing Univision's coverage and availability in Central Florida. The next month, spurred in part by the signal upgrade, Entravision debuted a local news department for WVEN-TV with 6 and 11 p.m. newscasts.

Univision itself entered the Orlando market by way of its 2001 purchase of USA Broadcasting, which owned WBSF (channel 43) in Melbourne. That station became part of the new Telefutura (later UniMás) network on January 14, 2002, as WFUO and later WOTF-TV. That same month, Univision entered into a joint sales agreement with Entravision, whereby Entravision provided local sales and promotional services to the Univision-owned Telefutura stations in six markets: Albuquerque, Boston, Denver, Orlando, Tampa, and Washington, D.C. This agreement was replaced by a new version in 2004.

=== WOTF-TV: UniMás, Grit and WAPA Orlando ===
On December 4, 2017, as part of a realignment affecting five of the six markets, the programming and call signs of WOTF and WVEN-TV were swapped: WOTF-TV and its UniMás programming moved to the Entravision-owned facility using virtual channel 26, while Univision's facility on virtual channel 43 became the new home of WVEN-TV. Entravision continued to operate WVEN-TV on its new channel 43. After the Entravision agreement concluded at the end of 2021, Univision assumed control of WVEN and WVEA-TV in Tampa effective January 1, 2022.

On February 2, 2026, it was announced that Entravision had reached an agreement with Hemisphere Media Group to launch WAPA Orlando. The channel airs the original programming of Puerto Rico's WAPA-TV as well as dedicated local morning and midday newscasts for Central Florida produced from San Juan. Entravision would manage sales, digital marketing, and Central Florida–market production. WAPA, in turn, received the ability to utilize the news resources of Entravision-owned stations in its coverage.

== Technical information ==
=== Subchannels ===
WOTF-TV's transmitter is located near Orange City, Florida. The station's signal is multiplexed:

Subchannels of WOTF-TV
Subchannel	Res.	Short name	Programming
26.1	720p	WAPA-TV	WAPA Orlando
26.2	480i	LATV	LATV
26.3	480i	Comet	Comet
26.4	480i	Charge	Charge!
26.7	480i	JTV	Jewelry TV
26.88	720p	AltaVsn	AltaVision

Subchannel broadcast with MPEG-4 video

=== Analog-to-digital conversion ===
WOTF-TV (as WVEN-TV) began digital broadcasting—initially at low power—on April 17, 2003. It ended programming on its analog signal, on UHF channel 26, on February 17, 2009, the original date planned for the digital television transition. The station's digital signal continued to broadcast on its pre-transition UHF channel 49, using virtual channel 26. WVEN-TV was repacked to channel 15 on January 17, 2020, as a result of the 2016 United States wireless spectrum auction.
