= WRCF-CD =

Television station in Orlando, Florida

- Orlando, Florida; United States
- Channels: Digital: 16 (UHF); Virtual: 29
- Branding: UniMás Orlando

Programming
- Affiliations: 29.1: UniMás

Ownership
- Owner: TelevisaUnivision; (Univision Local Media, Inc.)
- Sister stations: WVEN-TV

History
- First air date: October 17, 1991
- Former channel numbers: Digital: 35 (UHF, until 2020)
- Former affiliations: Retro TV; The Country Network; Cheddar; Univision (via WVEN-TV, 2019−2021)
- Call sign meaning: Winter Park, Central Florida

Technical information
- Licensing authority: FCC
- Facility ID: 10549
- Class: CD
- ERP: 15 kW
- HAAT: 193.1 m (634 ft)
- Transmitter coordinates: 28°35′12.6″N 81°4′57.5″W
- Repeater: WVEN-TV 43.7 Melbourne

Links
- Public license information: Public file; LMS

WRCF-CD (channel 29) is a low-power, Class A television station in Orlando, Florida, United States, broadcasting the Spanish-language network UniMás. It is owned and operated by TelevisaUnivision alongside Univision outlet WVEN-TV (channel 43). The two stations share studios on Douglas Avenue in Altamonte Springs; WRCF-CD's transmitter is located in unincorporated Bithlo, Florida.

Even though WRCF-CD operates a digital signal of its own, the low-power broadcasting radius only covers the immediate Orlando area. Therefore, in order to reach the entire market, it is simulcast in 720p high definition on WVEN-TV's seventh digital subchannel (43.7) from the same transmitter site.

== Sale to Univision ==
On May 8, 2017, LocusPoint Networks agreed to sell WRCF-CD to Univision Communications' Univision Local Media for $2.5 million. The sale was completed on August 14.

On October 13, 2021, Entravision Communications announced that it was ceding control of WVEN-TV and WRCF-CD back to Univision along with the UniMás affiliation then held by WOTF.

== Subchannel ==
Subchannel of WRCF-CD
Subchannel	Res.	Short name	Programming
29.1	1080i	WRCF-CD	UniMás

Sometime in 2019, WRCF-CD upgraded its channel into 1080i 16:9 high definition. It has previously been offered in 480i 4:3 standard definition.
