= WUVC-DT =

Television station in Fayetteville, North Carolina

- Fayetteville–Raleigh–; Durham, North Carolina; United States
- City: Fayetteville, North Carolina
- Channels: Digital: 22 (UHF); Virtual: 40
- Branding: Univision 40 North Carolina (general); Noticias N+ Univision 40 (newscasts); UniMás Raleigh (40.2)

Programming
- Affiliations: 40.1: Univision; 40.2: UniMás; for others, see § Subchannels

Ownership
- Owner: TelevisaUnivision; (WUVC License Partnership, G.P.)

History
- First air date: June 1, 1981
- Former call signs: WKFT (1981–2003); WUVC (2003); WUVC-TV (2004–2009)
- Former channel numbers: Analog: 40 (UHF, 1981–2009); Digital: 38 (UHF, until 2019)
- Former affiliations: Independent (1981–1989, 1990–2003); CBS (1989–1990, simulcast with WRAL-TV)
- Call sign meaning: Univision Carolina

Technical information
- Licensing authority: FCC
- Facility ID: 16517
- ERP: 480 kW
- HAAT: 558 m (1,831 ft)
- Transmitter coordinates: 35°30′43.9″N 78°58′39.8″W
- Translator(s): WTNC-LD 26.2 Raleigh

Links
- Public license information: Public file; LMS
- Website: www.univision.com/local/north-carolina-wuvc

WUVC-DT (channel 40) is a television station licensed to Fayetteville, North Carolina, United States, broadcasting the Spanish-language Univision network to the Research Triangle region. It is owned and operated by TelevisaUnivision alongside Raleigh-licensed low-power UniMás station WTNC-LD (channel 26). The two stations share studios on Falls of Neuse Road in Raleigh; WUVC-DT's transmitter is located northeast of Broadway, North Carolina.

WUVC-DT is also carried on Charter Spectrum's cable systems in the Charlotte and Greensboro–Winston-Salem–High Point markets.

== History ==
=== WKFT ===
On February 26, 1980, the Federal Communications Commission (FCC) granted a construction permit to Fayetteville Television, Inc., for a new commercial television station on channel 40 in Fayetteville. The station began broadcasting as independent station WKFT on June 1, 1981; studios were located in the old First Union Bank on Donaldson Street in downtown Fayetteville and transmitted its signal from a 750-foot (229 m) tower in unincorporated Cumberland County on Cliffdale Road, with 1.54 million watts of power (the tower site has since been annexed into Fayetteville). Fayetteville Television was organized by Robert Warren, a former Fayetteville reporter for WRAL-TV in Raleigh, who served as WKFT's first general manager. WKFT offered a general entertainment format consisting of cartoons, westerns, religious shows, dramas and classic sitcoms. The station put a fairly decent signal into the southern portion of the Triangle, but was harder to receive in the more densely populated areas of the market.

In 1985, the original owners sold WKFT to SJL Broadcasting, which formed Central Carolina Television to manage the station. The new owners subsequently invested about $5 million to build a new 1,800-foot (549 m) tower in Broadway, near the Harnett–Lee county line. The new transmitter, activated in June 1986, operated with a full five million watts of power. It gave channel 40 a coverage area comparable to the established Triangle stations, got the station on cable systems in the Raleigh–Durham area, and provided grade B coverage as far west as Greensboro. The station also rebranded itself as "Counterforce 40" and significantly upgraded its programming, competing with WLFL, the Triangle's largest independent, which joined the upstart Fox network. However, it operated on a low budget, selling advertising mainly in the southern part of the market.

By 1989, WKFT was in dire financial straits, reportedly from debts owed to film studios for movies shown on the station. It had also failed in a bid to take the NBC affiliation from WPTF-TV (now WRDC). In November, the sale of channel 40 was announced to the Zenox Corporation for $5 million.

=== WRAL on WKFT ===
On December 10, 1989, an ice storm collapsed the towers of WRAL-TV and WPTF-TV near Auburn. Within hours, WKFT had reached a deal to simulcast WRAL-TV's programming for almost all of its broadcast day as a public service. While WRAL was able to bring channel 5 back on the air before the end of the year at low power, it opted to remain on channel 40 even then in order to avoid any loss of viewership. This arrangement displaced nearly all of channel 40's own programming. Overnight movies were added to WRAL-WKFT's schedule in order to provide make-goods for national commercials in WKFT's shows.

However, WRAL's extended stay on channel 40 also provided a respite for WKFT, whose future was in limbo. SJL's deal to sell the station to Zenox collapsed in early March. WKFT did not resume its own schedule until WRAL-TV returned to full power and the November sweeps book was over. WRAL, which had purchased WKFT's tower and installed microwave equipment to add a roundup of Fayetteville news stories to its newscasts, continued a partnership with channel 40, which agreed to air any CBS programs channel 5 preempted.

While WKFT initially prepared programs for its return, SJL announced in early November that it would take channel 40 silent at the end of the month if no buyer could be found for the station, citing the striking down of must-carry regulations in 1985 and regional economic upheaval from the deployment of Fort Bragg troops ahead of the Gulf War; SJL chairman George Lilly said that the station might already have left the air if not for the unexpected revenues from the WRAL agreement. With days to go before the deadline, the station announced it would indeed remain on the air because it was nearing a deal to be sold.

=== New ownership in the 1990s ===
In the end, WKFT never went dark, but it was forced to declare bankruptcy on January 15, 1991, as program syndicators continued to ask for nearly $3 million in payments for future programming commitments. Exporter Elbert M. Boyd bought the station out of bankruptcy for $1.4 million. It was the first broadcasting property for Boyd and his new company, Delta Broadcasting. Under Boyd, the station turned around its finances, improved its coverage and tripled its ad rates.

After two and a half years, Boyd sold the station to Allied Communications, an investor group including several conservative-aligned figures headed by Thomas F. Ellis; the $4.4 million deal saw Boyd retain a minority stake. Allied carried out further improvements in programming and equipment; it also dropped the preempted WRAL programming, citing continued confusion over the station's identity from the yearlong simulcast.

Bahakel Communications bought the station in 1997 for $19.5 million. As the 1990s went on, WKFT found it increasingly difficult to find stronger programming, in part because its main competitors—WLFL, WRDC, and WRAZ—had far wealthier owners and aired advertising that targeted the entire market. It lost out on bids for the Triangle WB and UPN affiliations, which went to WRAZ and WRDC respectively. The station was forced to move toward more paid programming, though it briefly served as the over-the-air home of the Carolina Hurricanes.

In December 2001, Bahakel put WKFT up for sale, alongside WBAK-TV in Terre Haute, Indiana. While it was on the block, tragedy struck again, this time affecting WKFT's own tower. On March 14, 2002, a single-engine airplane struck the tower, causing it to collapse and leading to a fatal crash; a temporary transmitter was mounted on WRAL-TV's tower while the Broadway site was rebuilt.

=== Univision era ===
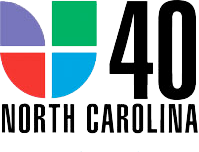
Former logo, used until December 31, 2012

Bahakel announced in December 2002 that it was selling WKFT to Univision Communications. The sale was completed in April 2003; the station changed its call sign to WUVC and network affiliation to Univision on June 1 of that year, becoming North Carolina's first Spanish-language television station. Its English-language programming inventory was picked up by WLFL and WRDC. The station later moved from its longtime studios in downtown Fayetteville to a new facility in Raleigh.

== News operation ==
In 1986, WKFT debuted a locally produced prime-time newscast at 10 p.m., which focused more on Fayetteville and the southern part of the Triangle market. The newscast was later cancelled in 1989. After Delta Broadcasting bought WKFT in 1991, news programming was reinstated, although relegated to hourly news updates. Between January 3 and April 18, 1995, WKFT produced a live noon newscast, with national segments provided by Conus Communications' All News Channel. The operation, mostly staffed by recent college graduates, also started the career of Dallas Woodhouse, who would later work at WNCN and serve as executive director of the North Carolina Republican Party. Under Bahakel, the station featured nightly news briefs between 1997 and 2001.

After becoming a Univision-owned station, on April 19, 2004, WUVC launched the first Spanish-language news operation in North Carolina, with prime time news briefs branded as Notibreves. The station then expanded its programming to include a 6 p.m. newscast three nights a week. As part of an expansion of Univision's local news operations, the station added a weeknight 6 p.m. and 11 p.m. newscast, titled Noticias 40, on August 29, 2011; it is the first Spanish-language newscast in North Carolina.

== Out-of-market cable carriage ==
In recent years, WUVC has been carried on cable in multiple areas outside of the Triangle media market. That includes cable systems within the Greensboro, Greenville and Myrtle Beach, SC markets in North Carolina.

On October 16, 2013, WUVC replaced the national Univision feed on Time Warner Cable (now Spectrum)'s Charlotte-area systems. The station changed its branding from simply "Univision 40" to "Univision 40 North Carolina" (rather than "Univision 40 Carolina del Norte"), reflecting that it now reaches half the state via cable.

== Technical information ==
=== Subchannels ===
Subchannels of WUVC-DT and WTNC-LD
Subchannel		Res.	Short name	Programming
WUVC-DT	WTNC-LD	Res.	Short name	Programming
40.1	26.2	720p	WUVC-DT	Univision
40.2	26.1	720p	UNIMAS	UniMás
40.3	26.3	480i	Confess	Confess
40.4	26.4	480i	GetTV	Great (4:3)
40.5	26.5	480i	Laff	Laff
40.6	26.6	480i	Quest	Quest
40.7	26.7	480i	MSGold	MovieSphere Gold
40.8	26.8	480i	BT2	Infomercials

Subchannel broadcast with MPEG-4 video

=== Analog-to-digital conversion ===
WUVC ended regular programming on its analog signal, over UHF channel 40, on June 12, 2009, the official date on which full-power television stations in the United States transitioned from analog to digital broadcasts under federal mandate. The station's digital signal continued to broadcast on its pre-transition UHF channel 38, using virtual channel 40.

== See also ==
- WTNC-LD
