= WLLC-LD =

Television station in Nashville, Tennessee

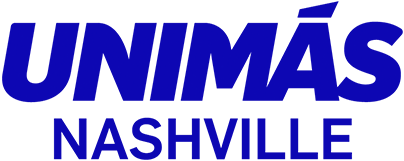
- Nashville, Tennessee; United States
- Channels: Digital: 19 (UHF); Virtual: 42
- Branding: Univision Nashville; UniMás Nashville (42.2)

Programming
- Affiliations: 42.1: Univision; 42.2: UniMás; for others, see § Subchannels

Ownership
- Owner: JKB Associates, Inc.

History
- First air date: November 7, 1996
- Former call signs: W59AW (1996–1997); W52CT (1997–2004); W42CR (2004–2005); WLLC-LP (2005–2021)
- Former channel numbers: Analog: 59 (UHF, 1996–1997), 52 (UHF, 1997–2004), 42 (UHF, 2004–2009); Digital: 41 (UHF, 2007–2014), 42 (UHF, 2014–2021)
- Former affiliations: America One (1996–2004); TeleFutura/UniMás (2004–2014, now on LD2)

Technical information
- Licensing authority: FCC
- Facility ID: 41793
- Class: LD
- ERP: 14.9 kW
- HAAT: 148.14 m (486 ft)
- Transmitter coordinates: 36°9′49″N 86°46′45″W

Links
- Public license information: LMS

WLLC-LD (channel 42) is a low-power television station in Nashville, Tennessee, United States, affiliated with the Spanish-language networks Univision and UniMás. Owned by JKB Associates, Inc., the station has studios on Cool Springs Boulevard in Franklin, and its transmitter is located atop the Life & Casualty Tower in Nashville's Capitol District.

== History ==
The station signed on the air with the call sign W59AW on channel 59 on November 7, 1996, and carried programming from America One 24 hours a day. The next year, the station moved to channel 52 and changed its call sign to W52CT.

In 2004, it moved to channel 42 and changed its call sign to W42CR. The station also dropped the America One affiliation and became an affiliate of the new Spanish-language network TeleFutura. The station changed its call sign again that same year to WLLC-LP.

WLLC-LP launched a third digital subchannel on 42.3 affiliated with Bounce TV after the network launched in 2011 as the first 24/7 digital multicast network created exclusively for African Americans. TeleFutura was rebranded as UniMás. From 2005 to 2013, the station was branded as TeleFutura 42, and after TeleFutura was rebranded to UniMás, then identified itself as UniMás Nashville.

UniMás Nashville Logo used from 2013 to 2021.

In July 2014, WLLC-LP affiliated with Univision (which is a sister network to UniMás) on its main channel of 42.1, therefore programming from UniMás moved to WLLC's second subchannel of 42.2, and programming from Bounce TV moved to a new subchannel of 42.3.

On July 5, 2016, WLLC-LP added Biz Television to a new subchannel of 42.4, Biz Television would be relocated to 42.5 at a later date, as Heartland was added to channel 42.4 on November 1, 2016, therefore making WLLC-LP the new flagship station for Heartland. WSMV-TV previously served as the flagship station for Heartland from 2012 (when it made its return as a reincarnation of The Nashville Network) until November 1, 2016, when WSMV replaced Heartland with Escape on its 4.2 subchannel. At some point in 2017, the 42.5 subchannel for Biz Television was discontinued. However, the 42.5 subchannel would be reactivated on December 24, 2018, carrying another Spanish network called NuestraVision.

On December 2, 2019, WLLC-LP discontinued Bounce TV on 42.3 and Heartland on 42.4, Bounce TV was replaced with the general entertainment network, AMGTV on 42.3, while Heartland was replaced with a test pattern on 42.4.

The station was licensed for digital operation on July 14, 2021, changing its call sign to WLLC-LD.

WLLC added TheGrioTV to its third subchannel on Monday, October 11, 2021, replacing AMGTV. On January 1, 2025, at 4AM CST, TheGrio went dark as a linear television network on 42.3, However, it remains available on cable providers, along with its FAST channel presence.

== News operation ==
WLLC-LP previously carried daily 90-second news updates. The news updates were produced by WTVF and were anchored by Eva Melo. It was the only Spanish-language newscast in Nashville, a market consisting of about 4 percent Spanish-speaking viewers, a fast-growing audience in the Middle Tennessee area. As of 2011, WTVF no longer produced news updates for WLLC-LP.

In 2014, WLLC general manager Dave Carter said the station had plans to include local news-related programming, but would be at least 2015 before a traditional newscast would be offered.

== Subchannels ==
The station's signal is multiplexed:

Subchannels of WLLC-LD
Subchannel	Res.	Short name	Programming
42.1	720p	Univis	Univision
42.2	480i	Unimas	UniMás
42.3	480i	CAS	Classic Arts Showcase
42.5	480i	ASTN	All Sports TV Network (4:3)
