= KUTU-CD =

Television station in Tulsa, Oklahoma

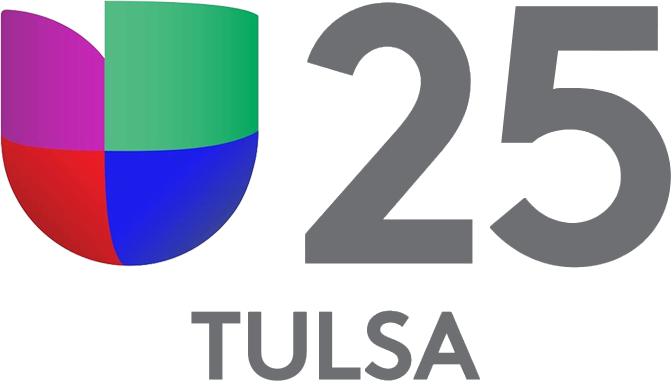
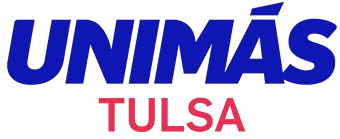
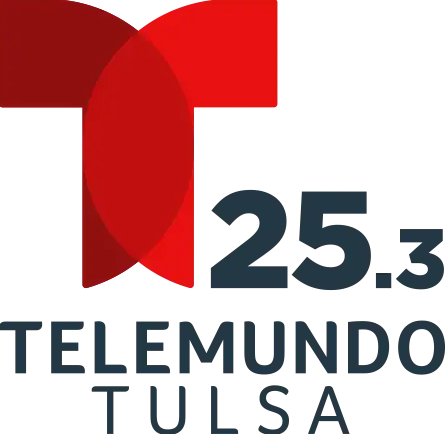
- Tulsa, Oklahoma; United States
- Channels: Digital: 17 (UHF); Virtual: 25
- Branding: Univision 25; UniMás Tulsa (25.2); Telemundo 25.3 (25.3)

Programming
- Affiliations: 25.1: Univision; 25.2: UniMás; 25.3: Telemundo; for others, see § Subchannels

Ownership
- Owner: Tyler Media Group; (Tyler Media LLC)

History
- Founded: December 30, 1994
- First air date: December 20, 1996
- Former call signs: K25FF (1994–1996); KLOT-LP (1996–2005); KUTU-CA (2005–2011)
- Former affiliations: (Possibly) Independent
- Call sign meaning: "Univision Tulsa"

Technical information
- Licensing authority: FCC
- Facility ID: 31369
- Class: CD
- ERP: 6.55 kW
- HAAT: 138.5 m (454 ft)
- Transmitter coordinates: 36°9′1″N 95°59′26.1″W

Links
- Public license information: Public file; LMS
- Website: unidosok.com/tulsa/univision/

KUTU-CD (channel 25) is a low-power, Class A television station in Tulsa, Oklahoma, United States, affiliated with the Spanish-language networks Univision, UniMás, and Telemundo. Owned by Tyler Media Group, the station maintains programming and advertising sales offices at Eastland Plaza (on East 21st Street and South 145th East Avenue) in southeast Tulsa, and its transmitter is located atop Arvest Tower (at the corner of West 6th Street and South Boulder Avenue West) in downtown Tulsa. Master control and some internal operations are based at the facilities of sister stations and fellow Univision and Telemundo affiliates KUOK and KTUZ-TV near Southeast 51st Street and Shields Boulevard in southern Oklahoma City.

== History ==
KUTU logo, used prior to January 1, 2013.

The station was founded on December 30, 1994, as very low-power K25FF; the call letters were never used on-air. The station was finally granted a license sometime in 1996 under the call letters KLOT-LP. The station was then sold to Little Rock, Arkansas-based Equity Broadcasting Corporation (later Equity Media Holdings), under the licensee "Woodward Broadcasting, Inc.", in 2004. On March 1, 2005, the station changed its call letters to KUTU-CA, and became an affiliate of Spanish–language network Univision.

On June 25, 2008, Equity announced that it was selling KUTU to Luken Communications, LLC. The sale preceded Equity Media Holdings' Chapter 11 bankruptcy protection filing in December 2008; offers by Luken Communications to acquire Equity-owned stations in six markets were later withdrawn. KUTU-CA was later sold at auction to the Oklahoma City-based Tyler Media Group on April 16, 2009. The following year, the station filed a construction permit to move to UHF channel 45 and at the same time, upgrade its transmitter's effective radiated power from 5.06 kilowatts to about 25 kilowatts. In December 2011, KUTU-CA shut down its analog signal and flash-cut its digital signal into operation on UHF channel 25; its call letters were also modified to KUTU-CD.

== Newscasts ==
In August 2011, KUTU began simulcasting Spanish-language newscasts (airing weeknights at 5 and 10 p.m.) produced by Telemundo-affiliated sister station KTUZ-TV in Oklahoma City, upon the rebranding of its newscasts as Acción Oklahoma (a variant of the Action News branding). Weather forecast segments during the newscasts include current conditions and seven-day forecasts for both the Tulsa and Oklahoma City metropolitan areas. As Univision airs its national late-night news program Noticiero Univision: Edicion Nocturna at 10:30 p.m., KUTU signs off from the 10 p.m. edition of Acción Oklahoma five minutes before the conclusion of the broadcast on KTUZ (with an additional segment that runs until rejoining Telemundo programming at 10:35 p.m.).

== Subchannels ==
The station's signal is multiplexed:

Subchannels of KUTU-CD
Subchannel	Res.	Short name	Programming
25.1	1080i	KUTUCD1	Univision
25.2	1080i	KUTUCD2	UniMás
25.3	1080i	KUTUCD3	Telemundo
25.4	480i	KUTUCD4	WEST
25.5	480i	KUTUCD7	Catchy Comedy
25.6	480i	KUTUCD6	Story Television

== See also ==
- KUOK
