= WVEN-TV =

Television station in Melbourne, Florida

- Melbourne–Orlando, Florida; United States
- City: Melbourne, Florida
- Channels: Digital: 22 (UHF); Virtual: 43
- Branding: Univision Orlando; Noticias N+ Univision Orlando (newscasts)

Programming
- Affiliations: 43.1: Univision; 43.7: UniMás; for others, see § Subchannels

Ownership
- Owner: TelevisaUnivision; (UniMas Orlando, Inc.)
- Sister stations: WRCF-CD

History
- First air date: July 5, 1982
- Former call signs: WMOD (1982–1988); WBSF (1988–2001); WFUO (2001–2002); WOTF (2002–2003); WOTF-TV (2004–2009); WOTF-DT (2009–2017)
- Former channel numbers: Analog: 43 (UHF, 1982–2009); Digital: 20 (UHF, until 2009), 43 (UHF, 2009–2020)
- Former affiliations: Independent (1982–1988); HSN (1988–2002); Telefutura/UniMás (2002–2017)
- Call sign meaning: Ven (Spanish for "come" or "they see")

Technical information
- Licensing authority: FCC
- Facility ID: 5802
- ERP: 1,000 kW
- HAAT: 492 m (1,614 ft)
- Transmitter coordinates: 28°35′12.6″N 81°4′57.5″W

Links
- Public license information: Public file; LMS
- Website: www.univision.com/local/orlando-wven

WVEN-TV (channel 43) is a television station licensed to Melbourne, Florida, United States, serving as the Orlando area outlet for the Spanish-language network Univision. It is owned and operated by TelevisaUnivision alongside low-power, Class A UniMás station WRCF-CD (channel 29). The two stations share studios on Douglas Avenue in Altamonte Springs; WVEN-TV's transmitter is located in Bithlo, Florida.

Channel 43 went on the air as WMOD, an English-language independent station, on July 5, 1982. Built by an investor group led by former U.S. representative Lou Frey, the station was the first broadcast TV station in Brevard County. Its early history was pocked with technical and financial trouble; the station's launch was delayed a day due to technical troubles, and signal issues caused many advertisers to flee. A larger signal issue was created when federal aviation authorities refused to allow the station to raise the height of its tower, which would have improved reception in the populous Orlando area.

In 1985, New Jersey–based Press Broadcasting bought WMOD, intending to make it a more highly viewed independent in the Orlando market. It soon struggled with the same signal limitations and began a search for a remedy. In the meantime, it ceded most of the station's airtime, as well as a purchase option, to the Home Shopping Network (HSN). This gave Press time to purchase a construction permit for channel 68 and to set up a future swap to channel 18. HSN assigned its purchase option to Black-owned Blackstar Communications, which took over WMOD in April 1988 and began running it as an all-home shopping station under the new call sign WBSF. Press retained the station's syndicated programming inventory and used it to launch WKCF later that year.

Blackstar sold WBSF to USA Broadcasting in 1998, but a planned change in program format never materialized, and USA Broadcasting sold the station to Univision in 2001. It was one of the USA Broadcasting stations used to start the Telefutura network—precursor to UniMás—on January 14, 2002. The station changed call signs, first to WFUO and then to WOTF-TV. Univision already had a local affiliate in Orlando, WVEN-TV (channel 26), and let its owner, Entravision Communications, handle local sales and promotion for WOTF-TV and Univision-owned Telefutura stations in five other markets. In 2017, in most of these markets, Univision and UniMás switched signals, moving Univision programming to the Univision-owned license even though Entravision continued to handle operations; as a result, WVEN-TV and WOTF-TV exchanged call signs. In Orlando and Tampa, this agreement was wound down at the end of 2021, making WVEN-TV a Univision owned-and-operated station.

== History ==
=== Construction and early years ===
In February 1979, an investor group led by Lou Frey, a former U.S. representative, announced its intention to seek channel 43 in Melbourne for a new independent station. Brevard County had two local cable channels operate at different points, and other groups had expressed interest in constructing a station. Their application, under the name Southern Broadcasting Corporation, reached the Federal Communications Commission that August; the construction permit was granted in late 1980.

Southern Broadcasting intended initially to locate the station's tower in west-central Brevard County but could not secure approval there due to nearby airports. The station then received approval from neighboring Osceola County to build a 1,049-foot (320 m) tower and antenna structure in the Deseret Ranch area, just across the county line, in December 1980. At that time, the station's call sign was announced as WKNA for two of its senior leaders, executive vice president Wharton K. Burgreen and Nelle Ayers. Little occurred until early 1982, when Southern Broadcast sold a majority stake in the company to BMS Broadcasting Corporation of Baton Rouge, Louisiana, and Frey announced the station would debut on July 4.

Channel 43—renamed WMOD before launch—almost made the target date. Just six days before the station was to go on air, a subcontractor began building the tower after the main contractor hired for the job defaulted. (Note: A jury later gave the subcontractor $196,000 after WMOD's ownership breached the contract.) On July 4, the station attempted to make its first broadcast and failed to do so. The intended live dedication ceremony had to be taped; a satellite dish was inoperable; and while work to correct the transmission line on the station's tower was under way, it was struck by lightning. WMOD made it to air the next night, its antenna mounted temporarily at the 226 feet (69 m) level on the mast. That was not fixed until the end of July. The station's programming primarily consisted of movies and syndicated reruns.

Days before WMOD attempted its first broadcast, the Federal Aviation Administration (FAA) weighed in on an application by WMOD to extend the tower it had built from 1,000 feet (300 m) to 1,500 feet (460 m). This was objected to by some in the local aviation community, because the higher tower would obstruct the visual flight rules flight path from Melbourne Regional Airport to Orlando Executive Airport. Even though the Melbourne Airport Authority approved the idea as a way to prevent more towers from clustering in the area, and Brevard legislators sided with WMOD, pilots believed the site posed a danger near a trafficked general aviation corridor and noted that many pilots on the route were students or vacationers. When the FAA recommended against the higher tower, it struck a blow at channel 43's attempt to improve its reception in greater Orlando and thus increase its potential audience. Frey appealed, but the FAA upheld its recommendation. The agency issued a second ruling to the same effect in December 1983.

The poorly executed launch and tower height issues proved detrimental to WMOD. Even though the technical issues were eventually remedied, many advertisers—as many as 90 percent—canceled their purchases and never returned. In October, just three months after beginning broadcasting, the station cut its expenses by 20 percent and laid off 13 employees. In spite of this, WMOD tried several new programming concepts, among them an all-night variety show with movies and comedy routines and high school football, including a live telecast of a state championship game between Titusville and Kissimmee Osceola. The high school football broadcasts lost money, and a local news block was cut due to poor ratings and increased coverage of Brevard County by the Orlando stations. By 1984, Orlando independent station WOFL (channel 35) had a market share of 8 percent, while WMOD trailed at 3 percent, in spite of an improved programming inventory.

=== Press Broadcasting ownership and transition to home shopping ===
In 1985, Southern Broadcasting sold WMOD to Press Broadcasting, a subsidiary of the Asbury Park Press newspaper in New Jersey, for $7 million in cash and debt. It was the company's first media property outside of its home state. Relieving channel 43 of its debt load allowed Press to be more aggressive in purchasing programming. In spite of a $7 million outlay on programming, the company ran into considerable difficulty because WMOD's transmitter site could not provide adequate full-market coverage. As a result, Press began to pivot its plans for WMOD. In September 1986, it signed an affiliation agreement with the Home Shopping Network (HSN), the first of its kind, to air up to 18 hours a day of home shopping programming; Press continued to program the remainder of channel 43's airtime with syndicated programming, but the deal gave HSN the option to buy WMOD at a $5 million valuation in 1988. Earlier that year, HSN had acquired Press's other television station, WSJT-TV in the Philadelphia market.

The HSN option gave Press time to find a solution to its signal problems, even as the FAA reached a settlement allowing a taller tower at a site 1.4 miles (2.3 km) away. The strategy consisted of several acquisitions. In September 1987, Press acquired and immediately donated to Brevard Community College (BCC) a non-commercial educational station licensed to Cocoa, WRES (channel 18). In the deal, BCC received the TV station facility, $1 million in operating funds, and another $240,000 to forge partnerships with the University of Central Florida (UCF), the Florida Institute of Technology, and public schools. In exchange, Brevard Community College agreed to eventually swap channels with Press Broadcasting. Two months later, Press agreed to buy the construction permit for WCLU (channel 68), a new station licensed to Clermont, which became the other half of the proposed swap arrangement. Robert McAllan, the vice president of broadcasting for Press Broadcasting, declared that the channel 68 permit purchase "culminate[d] a two-year search for improved transmission facilities" for WMOD.

=== Blackstar Communications and USA Broadcasting ownership ===
In December 1987, HSN assigned its option to buy WMOD to Blackstar Communications, a Black-owned firm controlled by John D. Oxendine, which exercised the option. The assignment was part of a larger affiliation agreement that saw Blackstar buy HSN-owned KHSP in Portland, Oregon, and HSN become a silent investor in Blackstar. The investors in Blackstar, including Wesley S. Williams Jr., were involved with a venture capital fund started by the National Association of Broadcasters. In April 1988, Blackstar took control of WMOD, and on April 20, it began broadcasting home shopping around the clock. The call sign changed in May 1988 to WBSF. Press kept the syndicated programming inventory, which it used to launch WKCF on channel 68 in December 1988.

Under Blackstar, non-home shopping programming was limited, though the station had a local youth talk show known as Teen Talk and aired several children's series. The company acquired a third home shopping station—WBSX-TV in Ann Arbor, Michigan—in 1989.

By 1998, USA Broadcasting—the owner of HSN—was developing a new television station format known as CityVision, which would emphasize local programming. When Blackstar began to talk to Paxson Communications Corporation about selling its station in Portland, USA Broadcasting chief Barry Diller intervened, resulting in an agreement that allowed Paxson to buy the Portland station on condition of selling him Paxson's station serving Atlanta for the CityVision format. At that time, USA Broadcasting bought Blackstar's other broadcast properties—WBSF and KEVN-TV in Rapid City, South Dakota—at prices below what the company initially sought. CityVision was intended for a phased launch nationally, and until that time, WBSF continued to air home shopping.

=== Univision ownership ===
CityVision never came to Orlando. The format failed to take off where it was introduced, and USA Broadcasting registered operating losses of $62 million in 2000 (equivalent to $116 million in 2025). Diller opted to sell the station group to Univision on December 7, 2000, for $1.1 billion (equivalent to $2.06 billion in 2025) in cash. At the time, Univision programs aired on a low-power station in Orlando, WVEN-LP (channel 63). That station, owned by Entravision Communications Corporation, and its programming moved in March 2001 after Entravision acquired the former WNTO-TV (channel 26) in Daytona Beach.

Most of the USA Broadcasting stations were used by Univision to start a second network. Telefutura launched on January 14, 2002, with channel 43—under the new call sign WFUO—as one of its affiliates. The station changed call signs again to WOTF-TV in April 2002. That same month, Univision entered into a joint sales agreement with Entravision, whereby Entravision provided local sales and promotional services to the Univision-owned Telefutura stations in six markets: Albuquerque, Boston, Denver, Orlando, Tampa, and Washington, D.C. This agreement was replaced by a new version in 2004. Telefutura rebranded as UniMás in 2013.

On December 4, 2017, as part of a realignment affecting five of the six markets, the programming and call signs of WOTF and WVEN-TV were swapped: WOTF-TV and its UniMás programming moved to the Entravision-owned facility using virtual channel 26, while Univision's facility on virtual channel 43 became the new home of WVEN-TV. Entravision continued to operate WVEN-TV. After the Entravision agreement concluded at the end of 2021, Univision assumed control of WVEN and WVEA-TV in Tampa effective January 1, 2022.

== News operation ==
Under Entravision and on channel 26, local Univision news debuted in the market in April 2001.

== Technical information ==
=== Subchannels ===
WVEN-TV's transmitter is located in Bithlo, Florida. The station's signal is multiplexed:

Subchannels of WVEN-TV
Subchannel	Res.	Short name	Programming
43.1	720p	WVEN-TV	Univision
43.2	480i	GREAT	Great (4:3)
43.3	480i	MVSGLD	MovieSphere Gold
43.4	480i	Nosey	Nosey
43.5	480i	Quest	Quest
43.6	480i	Confess	Confess by Nosey
43.7	720p	Unim-HD	UniMás (WRCF-CD)
43.8	480i	BT2	Infomercials

Simulcast of subchannels of another station
Subchannel broadcast with MPEG-4 video

=== Analog-to-digital conversion ===
Channel 43, then WOTF-TV, ended programming on its analog signal on June 12, 2009, as part of the federally mandated transition from analog to digital television. The station's digital signal relocated from its pre-transition UHF channel 20 to channel 43 for post-transition operations.

WVEN-TV was repacked to channel 22 on January 17, 2020, as a result of the 2016 United States wireless spectrum auction.
