= KTSB-CD =

Television station in Santa Maria, California

- Santa Maria–San Luis Obispo, California; United States
- City: Santa Maria, California
- Channels: Digital: 35 (UHF); Virtual: 35
- Branding: UniMás Costa Central

Programming
- Affiliations: 35.1: UniMás

Ownership
- Owner: Entravision Communications; (Entravision Holdings, LLC)
- Sister stations: KPMR

History
- First air date: September 28, 1995
- Former call signs: K35ER (1995–2009); KTSB-CA (2009–2015)
- Call sign meaning: Telefutura Santa Barbara (former name of UniMás)

Technical information
- Licensing authority: FCC
- Facility ID: 41127
- Class: CD
- ERP: 0.69 kW
- HAAT: 580.6 m (1,905 ft)
- Transmitter coordinates: 34°54′37″N 120°11′13″W
- Translator(s): KPMR 38.3 Santa Barbara

Links
- Public license information: Public file; LMS

KTSB-CD (channel 35) is a low-power, Class A television station licensed to Santa Maria, California, United States, serving the Central Coast of California as an affiliate of the Spanish-language network UniMás. It is owned by Entravision Communications alongside Santa Barbara–licensed Univision affiliate KPMR (channel 38). The two stations share studios on Fairway Drive in Santa Maria north of Santa Maria Public Airport; KTSB-CD's transmitter is located on Tepusquet Peak in Los Padres National Forest east of Santa Maria.

In addition to its own digital signal, KTSB-CD is simulcast in standard definition on KPMR's third digital subchannel from a separate transmitter in the Santa Ynez Mountains.

== History ==
KTSB's logo while on channel 43 and affiliated with Telefutura.

The Federal Communications Commission (FCC) granted a construction permit on September 28, 1995, to build a low-power television station on UHF channel 43 to serve Santa Barbara. Melissa Harnett was the original owner of the station, which was given the callsign K43FA. Harnett licensed the station on July 10, 1997. In January 1999, following the allotment of channel 43 to Los Angeles independent station KCAL-TV for their digital facilities, Harnett attempted to move the station to a location about 15 miles (24 km) away, change the channel assignment to UHF 29 and to increase the power to the maximum 150 kW. The application would eventually be dismissed by the FCC. In October 1998, Harnett agreed to sell the station to JB Broadcasting Inc. The sale was approved by the FCC in April 1999 and consummated the following July. JB Broadcasting applied to upgrade the station's license to Class A and, shortly after, agreed to sell the station to Univision Communications. The sale was approved in October 2001 and finalized in December and the station was granted a Class A license on October 9, 2002. About the same time, Univision agreed to sell the station to Entravision Communications and the deal was finalized in November 2002.

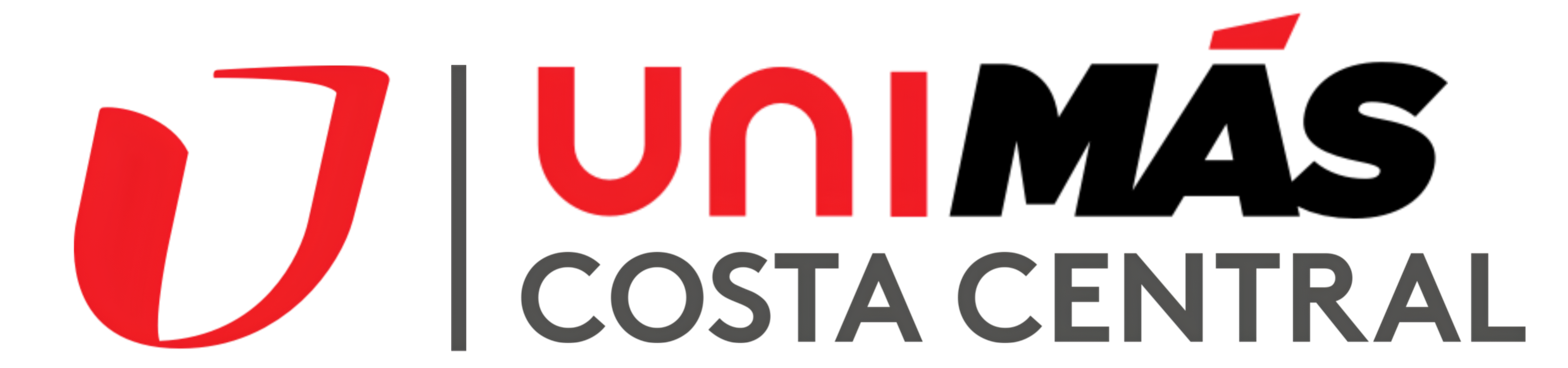
This was the station logo until 2021.

== Programming ==
KTSB-CD features programs from the UniMás network, plus local and children's programming to fulfill its Class A license. A half-hour of news followed by a half-hour of other local programming, both from KPMR and aired three days a week, gives the station its necessary three hours weekly of locally produced programming.

== Subchannel ==
Subchannel of KTSB-CD
Channel	Res.	Short name	Programming
35.1	1080i	KTSB-DT	UniMás
