= KPMR =

Television station in Santa Barbara, California

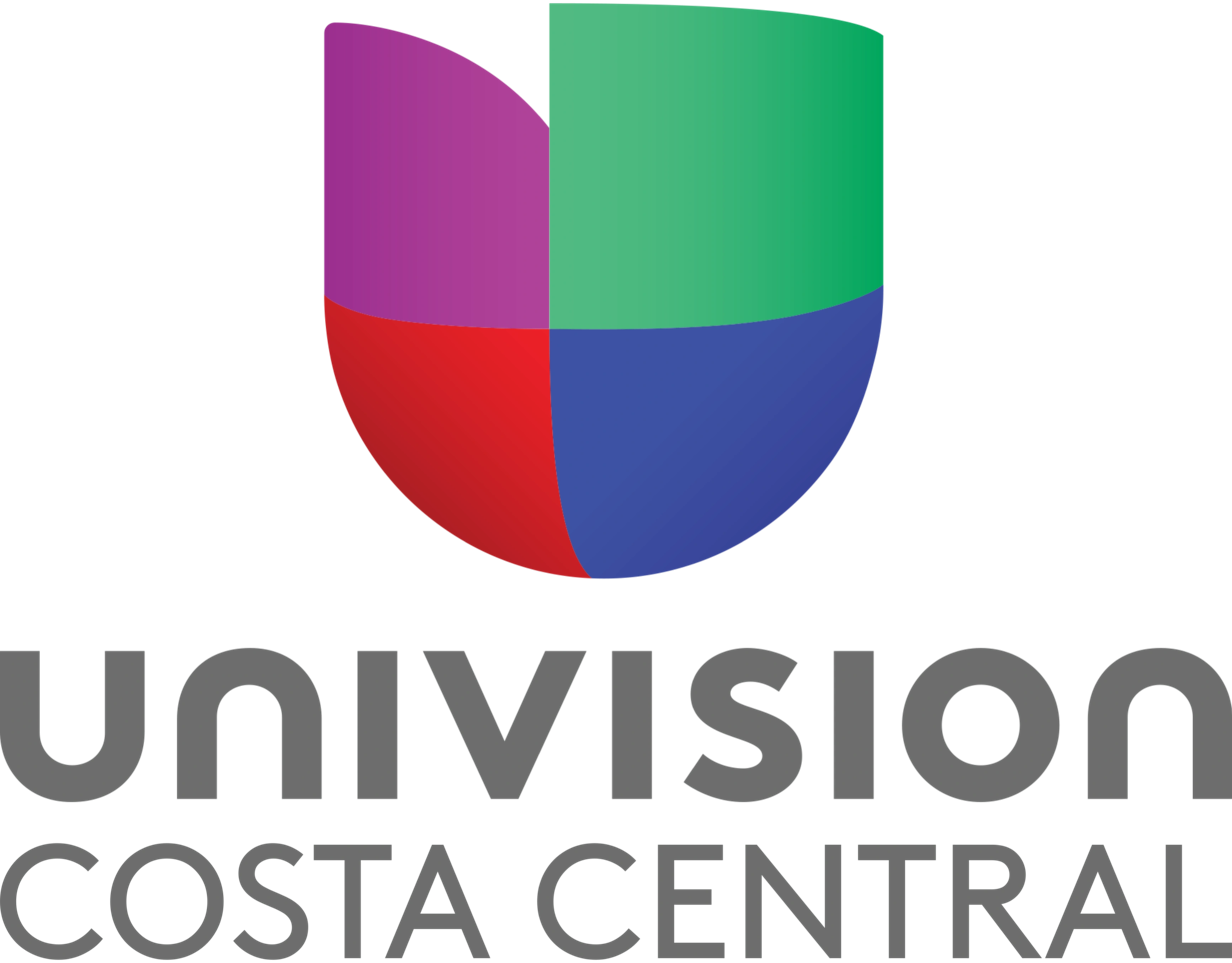
- Santa Barbara–Paso Robles–; San Luis Obispo, California; United States
- City: Santa Barbara, California
- Channels: Digital: 21 (UHF); Virtual: 38
- Branding: Univision Costa Central

Programming
- Affiliations: 38.1: Univision; 38.3: UniMás; 38.88: AltaVision

Ownership
- Owner: Entravision Communications; (Entravision Holdings, LLC)
- Sister stations: KTSB-CD

History
- First air date: April 1, 2001
- Former channel numbers: Analog: 38 (UHF, 2001–2009)

Technical information
- Licensing authority: FCC
- Facility ID: 12144
- ERP: 100 kW
- HAAT: 930 m (3,051 ft)
- Transmitter coordinates: 34°31′27.9″N 119°57′38.5″W
- Translator(s): K32LT-D (UHF) San Luis Obispo

Links
- Public license information: Public file; LMS
- Website: noticiassantabarbara.com

KPMR (channel 38) is a television station licensed to Santa Barbara, California, United States, serving the Central Coast of California as an affiliate of the Spanish-language network Univision. It is owned by Entravision Communications alongside Santa Maria–licensed UniMás affiliate KTSB-CD (channel 35). The two stations share studios on Fairway Drive in Santa Maria north of Santa Maria Public Airport; KPMR's transmitter is located atop Broadcast Peak, between Santa Barbara and Santa Ynez in the Santa Ynez Mountains.

== History ==
KPMR's logo from April 1, 2001, through December 31, 2012.

On May 23, 1997, the Federal Communications Commission (FCC) granted a construction permit to Coast TV to build a full-service television station on channel 38 to serve Santa Barbara and California's Central Coast. Originally identified by its application identification, "840720 kg", the station took call letters KPMR in February 1998. Entravision Communications acquired the station from Coast TV in a deal finalized in January 2001, and applied for a license for the station a month later, bringing the station on the air under program test authority as a Univision affiliate. The FCC granted the license on April 12, 2002.

On June 15, 2015, the studios of KPMR and KTSB-CA were broken into by former station employee Pablo Quiroz Jr., destroying computers, cars, windows, and hard drives. He also documented his vandalism on Twitter during the spree.

== Programming ==
KPMR airs Spanish-language programming such as telenovelas, comedies, movies, sports and news, as well as Univision network programming. Local programming includes a newscast originally called Noticias Costa Central, and recently rebranded as Noticias A Su Lado, which airs nightly at 6 and 11 p.m.

Competing news stations in the area announced that KPMR's news department would be shut down on December 30, 2011; however, the station continues to air local newscasts. The station also continues to operate as a Univision affiliate.

== Technical information ==
=== Subchannels ===
The station's signal is multiplexed:

Subchannels of KPMR
Channel	Res.	Short name	Programming
38.1	1080i	Univisn	Univision
38.3	480i	UniMas	UniMás (KTSB-CD)
38.88	1080i	AltaVsn	AltaVision

Simulcast of subchannels of another station
Subchannel broadcast with MPEG-4 video

The FCC granted KPMR a construction permit in March 2001 to build companion digital facilities to broadcast on channel 21 with 1000 kW ERP. After two extensions of the construction permit, the station applied for and was granted Special Temporary Authority (STA) to build reduced-power facilities in October 2003. After several extensions of the STA, KPMR-DT applied for a license for its full-power digital facilities in July 2006. The station has elected to remain on channel 21 after the end of the DTV transition.

=== Analog-to-digital conversion ===
KPMR shut down its analog signal, over UHF channel 38, on February 17, 2009, the original target date on which full-power television stations in the United States were to transition from analog to digital broadcasts under federal mandate (which was later pushed back to June 12, 2009). The station's digital signal remained on its pre-transition UHF channel 21, using virtual channel 38.

KPMR also broadcasts sister station KTSB-CD as a digital subchannel.
