= KBNT-CD =

Television station in San Diego

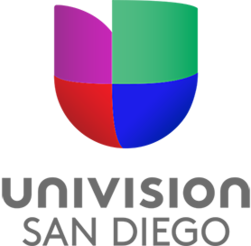
- San Diego, California; United States
- Channels: Digital: 24 (UHF); Virtual: 17
- Branding: Univision San Diego

Programming
- Affiliations: 17.1: Univision; 17.2: LATV; 17.88: AltaVision

Ownership
- Owner: Entravision Communications; (Entravision Holdings, LLC)
- Sister stations: KDTF-LD

History
- Founded: February 14, 1992
- First air date: December 3, 1992
- Former call signs: K17DI (1992–2000); KSZR-LP (2000); KBNT-LP (2000–2002); KBNT-CA (2002–2010); KDTF-CA (2010–2011); KTCD-CA (2011–2012); KBNT-CA (2012–2013)
- Former channel numbers: Analog: 17 (UHF, 1998–2013); Digital: 25 (UHF, 2013–2019)
- Call sign meaning: disambiguation of original K19BN translator calls

Technical information
- Licensing authority: FCC
- Facility ID: 4035
- Class: CD
- ERP: 15 kW
- HAAT: 219.8 m (721 ft)
- Transmitter coordinates: 32°50′20″N 117°14′59″W
- Translator(s): K25RF-D Vista

Links
- Public license information: Public file; LMS
- Website: noticiassd.com

KBNT-CD (channel 17) is a low-power, Class A television station in San Diego, California, United States, affiliated with the Spanish-language network Univision. It is owned by Entravision Communications alongside UniMás affiliate KDTF-LD (channel 36). The two stations share studios on Ruffin Road in San Diego's Kearny Mesa section; KBNT-CD's transmitter is located on Mount Soledad in La Jolla.

The station's signal is relayed on low-power K25RF-D (channel 25) in Vista.

== History ==
KBNT launched on May 19, 1987, as K19BN, owned by Cabrillo Broadcasting Corporation. The station obtained the Univision affiliation from Televisa-owned XEWT in Tijuana on January 1, 1990. At that time, San Diegans could receive the station only through cable television, because its weak broadcast signal could not reach the city proper. The station increased its transmitting power, boosting its signal. While still not reaching San Diego proper, it could be picked up in Escondido, San Marcos, Vista and Fallbrook.

On October 29, 1987, K49BV in Vista, owned by Vista Television, was launched. It was formerly a repeater of the Trinity Broadcasting Network. In 1995, its call sign was changed to KHAX-LP.

On December 23, 1994, K19BN reached an agreement with NBC affiliate KNSD (channel 39) to retransmit its programs on KBNT-LP (channel 62, later KNSD-LP in 1997) in La Jolla.

K19BN became KBNT-LP on August 22, 1997. That same year, ownership switched from Cabrillo to Entravision.

On June 28, 2000, major changes took place at Univision San Diego. The Univision affiliation switched from channel 19 (closed in 2001) to channel 17 (obtaining the KBNT-LP callsign and bought by Entravision), allowing Univision to reach San Diego, National City and Chula Vista over the air. This allowed then-WB affiliate (now Fox affiliate) KSWB-TV (channel 69) to operate on digital channel 19.

The new KBNT-LP added KHAX-LP as its relay station, extending its coverage to the north. In 2002, KBNT-LP upgraded to Class A status, becoming KBNT-CA. KHAX-LP was sold to Entravision at the same time. The station's relay in La Jolla, KNSD-LP (channel 62), was shut down in 2007. That signal was leased to Entravision by KNSD owners Station Venture Operations, L.P. (operated as a joint venture between NBCUniversal and LIN Media until LIN dropped out of the venture in February 2013).

In the fall of 2008, KBNT-CD expanded again to a three-repeater operation, when KTCD-LP (channel 46) switched from repeating Azteca América–affiliated sister station XHAS-TV (channel 33) to KBNT.

On March 4, 2020, analog channel 49 (KHAX-LP) was shut down and a new digital channel 25 (KHAX-LD) signed on in Vista, California.

On August 9, 2021, the Federal Communications Commission canceled the license for analog translator KTCD-LP, as the station did not transition to digital operation by the July 13, 2021, deadline.

== Newscasts ==
KBNT-CD broadcasts five hours of local newscasts each week (with one hour each weekday); the station does not produce newscasts on Saturdays or Sundays. The station produces the public affairs program Perspectiva Nacional on Sundays at 6 p.m.

== Subchannels ==
The station's signal is multiplexed:

Subchannels of KBNT-CD
| Subchannel | Res. | Short name | Programming |
|---|---|---|---|
| 17.1 | 1080i | Univisn | Univision |
| 17.2 | 480i | LATV | LATV |
| 17.88 | 1080i | AltaVsn | AltaVision |

Subchannel broadcast with MPEG-4 video
