= KDTF-LD =

Television station in San Diego

- San Diego, California; United States
- Channels: Digital: 16 (UHF); Virtual: 36
- Branding: UniMás San Diego

Programming
- Affiliations: 36.1: UniMás; 36.17: Univision

Ownership
- Owner: Entravision Communications; (Entravision Holdings, LLC)
- Sister stations: KBNT-CD

History
- First air date: December 11, 1997
- Former call signs: K31FC (1997–2003); KDTF-LP (2003–2010); KDTF-LD (2010); KBNT-LD (2010–2012); KTCD-LD (2012)
- Former channel numbers: Analog: 31 (UHF, 1997–2003), 36 (UHF, 2003–2010); Digital: 51 (UHF, 2010–2019)
- Call sign meaning: San Diego Telefutura

Technical information
- Licensing authority: FCC
- Facility ID: 13022
- Class: LD
- ERP: 15 kW
- HAAT: 564 m (1,850 ft)
- Transmitter coordinates: 32°41′47.1″N 116°56′12″W

Links
- Public license information: LMS

KDTF-LD (channel 36) is a low-power television station in San Diego, California, United States, affiliated with the Spanish-language network UniMás. It is owned by Entravision Communications alongside Class A Univision affiliate KBNT-CD (channel 17). The two stations share studios on Ruffin Road in San Diego's Kearny Mesa section; KDTF-LD's transmitter is located on San Miguel Mountain in Spring Valley.

== History ==
This station was affiliated with Telefutura, the forerunner to UniMás, sometime in 2006, after talks reportedly broke down with sister station and former UPN affiliate XHUPN (channel 49, now XHDTV-TDT).

== Subchannels ==
The station's signal is multiplexed:

Subchannels of KDTF-LD
Subchannel	Res.	Short name	Programming
36.1	1080i	UniMas	UniMás
36.17	1080i	Univisn	Univision (KBNT-CD)

Simulcast of subchannels of another station

KDTF began broadcasting its digital signal on UHF channel 51 on May 14, 2009, and multicasting KBNT-CA and XHDTV.
