= Great Entertainment Television =

American broadcast television network

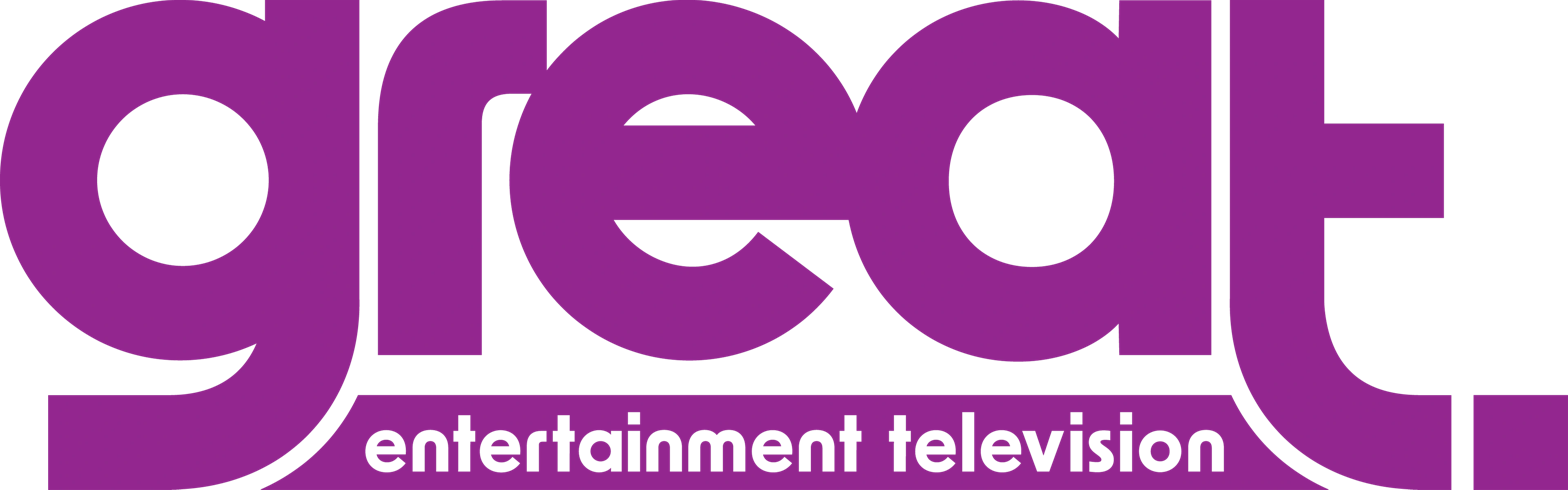
- Logo used since February 16, 2026
- Country: United States
- Broadcast area: National reach in the US: 83.74%
- Affiliates: List of affiliates
- Headquarters: Culver City, California

Programming
- Language: English
- Picture format: 1080i HDTV; downscaled to letterboxed 480i for the SDTV feed)

Ownership
- Owner: Sony Pictures Television Networks
- Parent: CPE US Networks, Inc.
- Key people: Tom Troy (senior vice president of U.S. Networks, SPT); Jeff Meier (senior vice president of U.S. Networks, SPT)
- Sister channels: Game Show Network; Sony Cine; Sony Movie Channel; Crunchyroll Channel

History
- Founded: April 22, 2013; 13 years ago
- Launched: February 3, 2014; 12 years ago
- Former names: GetTV (2014–2023); Get (2023–2026)

Links
- Website: watchgreat.com

Availability

Terrestrial
- Available in many markets via Digital subchannel: See List of affiliates

Streaming media
- Service(s): DirecTV Stream, Frndly TV, FuboTV, Hulu + Live TV, Philo, Samsung TV Plus, Sling Freestream, YouTube TV
- Footnotes/references

Great Entertainment Television (stylized as great. and formerly get. from 2023 to 2026, and previously as getTV) is an American digital multicast television network owned by the network television division of Sony Pictures Television. Originally known as GetTV from 2014 until its rebranding in 2023, the network was initially formatted as a movie-oriented service, and over time transitioned into a general entertainment network featuring primarily classic television series from the 1970s to the 2010s.

The network is available in many media markets via the digital subchannels of broadcast television stations and on the digital tiers of select cable providers through a local affiliate of the network. It is also carried by several streaming services.

== History ==
Logo used from 2014 launch until 2016

Sony Pictures announced the formation of getTV on April 22, 2013, with an initial main focus on pre-1980s films, Sony scheduled the network's formal launch for that fall. On its website, the network had originally announced that it would launch in October 2013, the premiere date was later pushed back to February 3, 2014. getTV launched at 4:00 p.m. Eastern Time on that date, initially debuting on the subchannels of twelve Univision and fourteen UniMás stations owned and/or managed by Univision Communications, the inaugural program shown on the network was the 1957 comedy film Operation Mad Ball.

On May 2, 2016, getTV switched its programming format from a largely exclusive focus on movies to a general entertainment network featuring a mix of television series and feature films (with its film focus shifting more towards movies released after 1960, outside its core Saturday western block). With the addition of series to its weekday daytime schedule, the network separated these programs into three daily blocks, consisting of sitcoms during the early morning, Westerns during the mid- and late-morning, and action and crime drama series during the afternoon and prime access dayparts (programs of the latter genre were also incorporated into the network's early morning schedule, preceding the comedy block, in September 2016).

getTV started Christmas programming in 2015 with two days. In 2016, the event expanded to 29 days starting on November 27, and was then named "The Most Wonderful Month of the Year." The Most Wonderful Month event also featured the network's first original program, A Nashville Christmas music variety special, in 2017.

Logo used from 2016 to September 10, 2023

Separate from the network's broadcast affiliation agreements, on December 17, 2015, Sony Pictures Television announced that the satellite provider would begin carrying getTV nationally on channel 373, available at minimum to subscribers of its "America's Top 120" programming tier. As a result of the deal, in which the network was added as part of a renewed carriage agreement with Dish Network for sister networks Sony Movie Channel and Cine Sony Television, getTV became the first digital multicast network to be carried by Dish, which (as with other satellite and IPTV providers) has typically refrained from seeking agreements to carry subchannels programmed by individual local television stations.

In September 2023, the network completed a rebranding process involving the removal of "TV" from its branding, as it had introduced a backronym earlier in the year, Great Entertainment Television, identical to the Memorable Entertainment Television backronym used by MeTV.

On February 16, 2026, Great Entertainment Television again rebranded, quietly dropping the GET acronym in favor of emphasizing "Great." (intentionally with a period) as its on-air branding, as well as introducing an updated logo (further emphasizing the move's silent occurrence, the "Get." logo was updated by adding letters to "Great.", albeit otherwise significantly refreshed, most notably shifting to a color combination of purple and white, with an orange dot included as a remnant of the earlier branding).

== Programming ==
Due to its ownership by Sony Pictures Entertainment, Great's program schedule relies in part on a portion of the extensive library of films and television series currently owned by network sister companies Sony Pictures Television and Sony Pictures Motion Picture Group (Columbia Pictures, TriStar Pictures, Screen Gems, 3000 Pictures), which comprises more than 3,500 films and 2,000 television series (including All in the Family, Sanford and Son). Sony Pictures already maintains programming distribution agreements with Antenna TV (owned by Nexstar Media Group) and Movies! (a joint venture between Weigel Broadcasting and Fox Television Stations), which allows those networks to carry films from the Sony library, in addition to a distribution deal with Antenna TV to broadcast television series to which Sony's television unit holds rights (mainly those produced by the various predecessors that existed prior to the company's 2002 consolidation of Columbia TriStar Television, Columbia Pictures Television and TriStar Television).

=== Television series ===
In the fall of 2015, Great began to break from its all-movie format (outside required children's programming content) to incorporate television series to its schedule, including series that have either not been syndicated in the past or have merely not been seen on broadcast television in decades.

Then on September 28, 2015, Great announced that it had reached respective agreements with World Nation Live Entertainment and Reelin' In the Years Productions to acquire the rights to The Judy Garland Show (which had not aired on television since it originally aired on CBS from 1963 to 1964) and a selection of about 50 episodes of The Merv Griffin Show, which would serve as the cornerstones of a new Monday night block of variety and talk programming (running from 8:00 p.m. to 11:00 p.m. Eastern Time, with same-night replay after the initial airing). The block, which debuted on October 12, 2015, also features musical variety specials and episodes from variety series (helmed by performers such as Andy Williams, Carol Channing, Pearl Bailey, Dionne Warwick, and Jim Nabors) acquired through agreements with Legacy Entertainment and Paul Brownstein Productions. As of 2021, variety shows are no longer included on the getTV schedule.

On January 1, 2018, the network began to air the most prominent sitcoms in the Sony Pictures Television library such as All in the Family, Sanford and Son, and Good Times as part of their primetime lineup, after the expiration of Sony's contract with Tribune Broadcasting's Antenna TV, along with the expiration six months prior with Rural Media Group where SPT programmed that company's FamilyNet with sitcoms until they went in another programming direction as The Cowboy Channel. From 2021 to 2026, the network aired game shows from its sister cable channel Game Show Network including Catch 21, Tug of Words, and Winsanity.

=== The Most Wonderful Month of the Year (2015–present) ===
This annual event began in 2015 with only two days of special Christmas programming. In 2016, the event gained a name and expanded to 29 days starting on November 27, with Christmas programming in prime time and a marathon the last two days. The event also featured the network's first original program, A Nashville Christmas in 2017. The music variety special, which aired on December 7, 2017, lasted 60 minutes and featured country stars, Wynonna, Emmylou Harris, Lorrie Morgan, Pam Tillis, Ashley Cleveland, and Dailey & Vincent.

== Affiliates ==
As of May 2016, Great has current or pending affiliation agreements with 92 television stations in 87 media markets encompassing 35 states (including stations in 47 of the 50, and all of the 25 largest Nielsen markets), covering approximately 73.24% of the United States. The network is offered to prospective affiliates through leasing arrangements, in which the network pays a monthly license fee to its stations for subchannel carriage, and handles all responsibility in selling advertising inventory – instead of the typical method for multicast services by securing affiliation deals through barter deals, with a network's affiliates sharing the duty of selling ads (as such, advertisements carried by most getTV affiliates strictly are those broadcast by the network, with no locally provided content outside federally mandated hourly station identifications).

When the network was first announced, Great entered into a channel lease agreement with Univision Communications, which launched the network in 24 markets served by a station owned by the group or operated through local marketing agreements with Entravision Communications – giving getTV affiliates in 17 of the 20 largest U.S. television markets (including markets such as New York City, Los Angeles, Chicago, Dallas–Fort Worth and Miami). The network immediately sought carriage on the digital subchannels of television stations owned by other broadcasting companies, on April 1, 2014, the Cox Media Group became the first station group outside the core Univision-owned outlets to sign select stations to carry getTV on their digital subchannels, Cox-owned KIRO-TV in Seattle, WAXN-TV in Charlotte and KMYT-TV in Tulsa began carrying the network on that date, with WTEV-TV (now WJAX-TV) in Jacksonville following suit that summer.

Most notably, on June 23, 2014, the network reached a channel lease agreement with the Sinclair Broadcast Group, the deal gave Great affiliations with stations that Sinclair owns or operates from Deerfield Media and Cunningham Broadcasting (including several that formerly carried TheCoolTV and The Tube on a digital subchannel that had been silent immediately prior to joining the network) in 33 markets, increasing getTV's reach to 70% of U.S. television households. 29 Sinclair stations added the network on July 1, 2014, with the others beginning to carry Great by the end of September 2014. Several stations involved in the Sinclair agreement have opted to preempt certain getTV programs to run to carry sports events from the company's American Sports Network syndication service in place of the network's national schedule during prime time (with some even switching to ASN event programming while a film is in progress) to accommodate regular programming on the main channel.

On February 1, 2016, Sony announced that it had reached a distribution agreement with Media General (which had announced days prior that it would merge with the Nexstar Broadcasting Group) for the network to be carried on stations owned and/or operated by the group in 20 markets (including San Francisco, Portland, Indianapolis, Grand Rapids and Harrisburg). WISH-TV in Indianapolis, WOTV in Grand Rapids and WHTM-TV in Harrisburg began carrying getTV on new or existing subchannels on that date, with additional Media General stations adding the network throughout the first quarter of 2016.
