= WVEA-TV =

Television station in Tampa, Florida

- Tampa–St. Petersburg, Florida; United States
- City: Tampa, Florida
- Channels: Digital: 20 (UHF); Virtual: 50
- Branding: Univision Tampa Bay; Noticias Tampa Bay (newscasts)

Programming
- Affiliations: 50.1: Univision; 50.6: UniMás; for others, see § Subchannels

Ownership
- Owner: TelevisaUnivision; (UniMas Tampa LLC)

History
- First air date: March 1, 1988
- Former call signs: WBHS (1988–1992); WBHS-TV (1992–2001); WFTT (2001–2003); WFTT-TV (2004–2009); WFTT-DT (2009–2017)
- Former channel numbers: Analog: 50 (UHF, 1988–2009); Digital: 47 (UHF, until 2020)
- Former affiliations: HSN (1988–2002); Telefutura/UniMás (2002–2017, now on 50.6)
- Call sign meaning: "Vea" is Spanish for "I see" (present subjunctive)

Technical information
- Licensing authority: FCC
- Facility ID: 60559
- ERP: 1,000 kW
- HAAT: 421 m (1,381 ft)
- Transmitter coordinates: 27°50′51.5″N 82°15′49.4″W

Links
- Public license information: Public file; LMS
- Website: www.univision.com/local/tampa-wvea

WVEA-TV (channel 50) is a television station licensed to Tampa, Florida, United States, broadcasting the Spanish-language Univision and UniMás networks to the Tampa Bay area. Owned and operated by TelevisaUnivision, WVEA-TV maintains studios in the Westlake Corporate Center office park (near SR 589) in Tampa, and its transmitter is located on an antenna farm in Riverview, Florida.

== History ==
The station first signed on the air on March 1, 1988, as WBHS (a "-TV" suffix was added to the call sign in 1992), serving as the flagship station of the Home Shopping Network (HSN) and the 12th station owned by the company through its broadcasting arm Silver King Communications. HSN programming was supplemented with locally produced public affairs and human interest briefs for 4 1/2 minutes each hour, which exceeded the number of hours independent stations were required to provide local programming (over 12 broadcast hours a week, counting repeats). The Sunday schedule was devoted to children's programming, including 1970s shows such as New Zoo Revue, to expose them to a younger audience.

In 1996, Barry Diller acquired the Home Shopping Network; two years later, HSN acquired USA Networks and renamed the broadcasting group as USA Broadcasting. Plans emerged in the late 1990s to convert WBHS-TV into a general entertainment independent station by 2002, mirroring the local programming-infused format that was already adopted by its stations in cities such as Atlanta, Dallas–Fort Worth and Miami; however, USA Broadcasting decided to sell its television stations in 2000, before any plans to change the station's format were made. The Walt Disney Company made a bid to acquire the group (which could have made a partnership with Scripps-owned WFTS-TV), but was outbid by Spanish-language broadcaster Univision Communications. WBHS-TV remained with HSN until January 14, 2002, when it became a charter owned-and-operated station of Univision's secondary network TeleFutura (which was renamed UniMás in January 2013) and changed its call letters to WFTT.

=== 2017 call sign and channel swap ===
On December 4, 2017, as part of a multi-market realignment, the programming and call signs of WFTT and sister station WVEA-TV were swapped: WFTT-TV and its UniMás programming moved to the Entravision-owned facility using digital channel 25 and virtual channel 62, while Univision's digital channel 47 and virtual channel 50 facility became the new home of WVEA-TV.

On October 13, 2021, Univision announced it would take over operation of WVEA-TV, as well as Orlando Univision affiliate WVEN-TV, effective January 1, 2022, coinciding with the end of licensing agreements on December 31, 2021.

In addition, even though WVEA-TV's public file shows them located at their former studios on Hillsborough Avenue in Tampa (in a former Barnett Bank building west of Armenia Avenue), WVEA-TV moved their facilities to the Westlake Corporate Center office park almost 4 miles (6.4 km) north of the Tampa International Airport. This was made possible due to the FCC's Main Studio Rule being repealed in 2019. As WVEA-TV's newscast operates from their Orlando sister station WVEN-TV, their new facility houses their advertising sales office and their news vehicles serving the Tampa Bay area.

== News operation ==
WVEA-TV presently broadcasts five hours of locally produced newscasts each week (with one hour each weekday); the station does not broadcast any news programming on Saturdays or Sundays. The station's news department shares resources with Orlando sister station WVEN-TV. WVEA simulcast WVEN's news programming until 2013, when WVEA began producing its own newscasts under the title Noticias Tampa Bay. On November 2, 2015, production of WVEA's newscasts was transferred back to WVEN; under this arrangement, WVEA's early evening newscast is produced live to tape an hour before WVEN's live newscast. In 2011, it produced five-minute news blocks on Facebook which ended when the news department relaunched. WVEN continues to produce sports and weather segments inserted into WVEA's newscasts.

== Technical information ==
=== Subchannels ===
The station's signal is multiplexed:

Subchannels of WVEA-TV
Subchannel	Res.	Short name	Programming
50.1	1080i	WVEA	Univision
50.2	480i	MSGold	MovieSphere Gold
50.3	480i	GET	Great (4:3)
50.4	480i	Confess	Confess by Nosey
50.5	480i	ShopLC	Shop LC
50.6	720p	UniMas	UniMás
50.7	480i	BT2	Infomercials

Subchannel broadcast with MPEG-4 video

Until 2013, WVEA-TV carried the Spanish-language music video network ZUUS Latino on its third digital subchannel. Until 2025, the station carried Ion Mystery on the fourth subchannel.

=== Analog-to-digital conversion ===
WVEA-TV (as WFTT-TV) shut down its analog signal, over UHF channel 50, on June 12, 2009, as part of the federally mandated transition from analog to digital television. The station's digital signal remained on its pre-transition UHF channel 47, using virtual channel 50.
