= KKJB =

Television station in Boise, Idaho

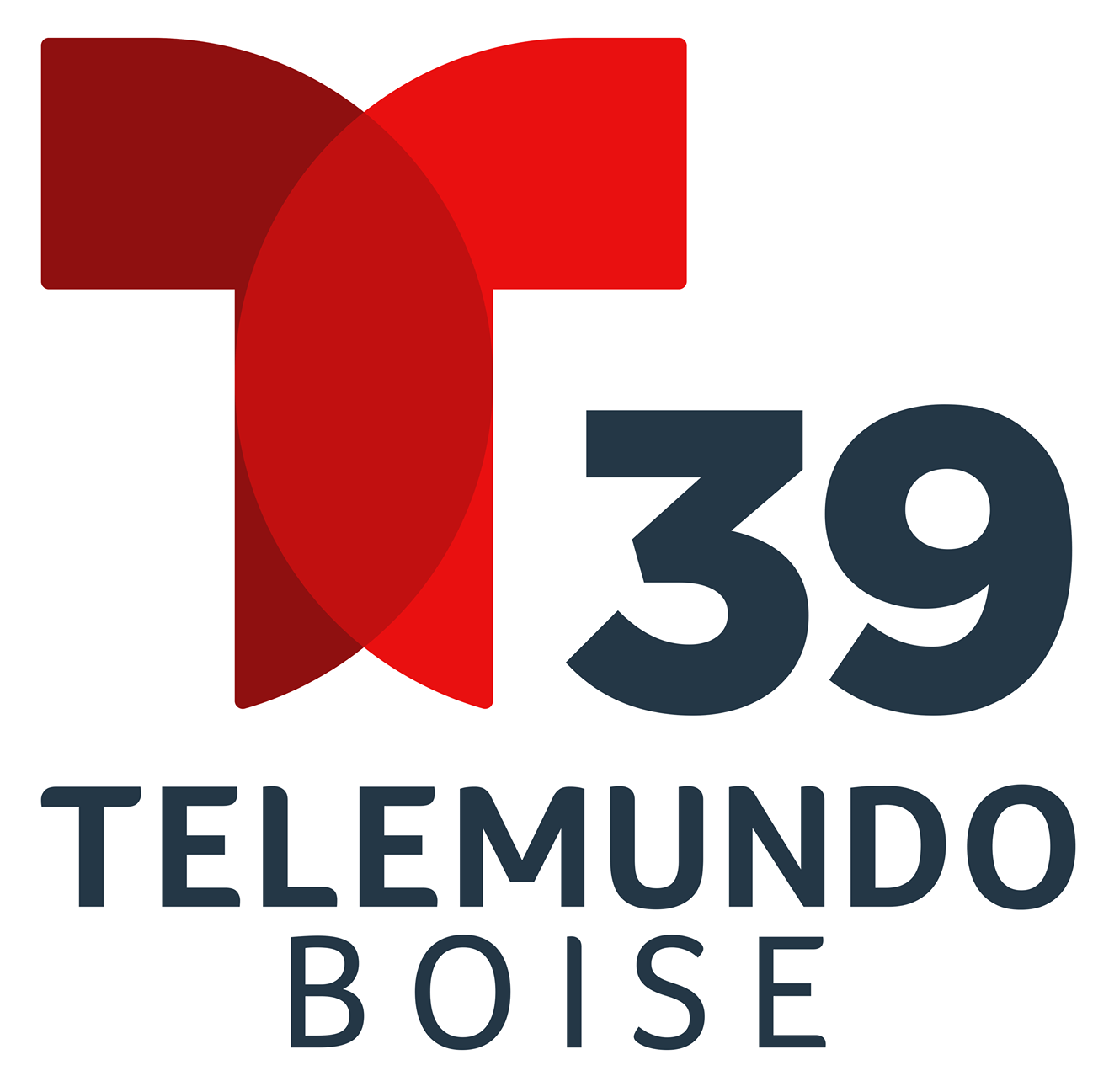
- Boise, Idaho; United States
- Channels: Digital: 15 (UHF); Virtual: 39
- Branding: Telemundo Boise

Programming
- Affiliations: 39.1: Telemundo; for others, see § Subchannels

Ownership
- Owner: Cocola Broadcasting; (Boise Telecasters, LP)
- Sister stations: see § Sister stations

History
- First air date: July 2005
- Former channel numbers: Analog: 39 (UHF, 2005–2009); Digital: 39 (UHF, 2009–2018)
- Former affiliations: America One (2005–2009); Daystar (2009–2014)

Technical information
- Licensing authority: FCC
- Facility ID: 35097
- ERP: 20.7 kW
- HAAT: 534 m (1,752 ft)
- Transmitter coordinates: 43°44′22.6″N 116°8′18.4″W

Links
- Public license information: Public file; LMS

KKJB (channel 39) is a television station in Boise, Idaho, United States, affiliated with the Spanish-language network Telemundo. Owned by Cocola Broadcasting, the station maintains a transmitter north of the city in the Boise National Forest.

== History ==
KKJB signed on the air in July 2005 as an affiliate of America One. In 2009, the station switched its affiliation to Daystar. In 2014, KKJB changed its Daystar affiliation to Telemundo.

== Technical information ==
=== Subchannels ===
The station's signal is multiplexed:

Subchannels of KKJB
Channel	Res.	Short name	Programming
39.1	1080i	Tele	Telemundo
39.2	480i	Cozi	Cozi TV
39.3	480i	MovieSp	MovieSphere Gold (4:3)
39.4	480i	Buzzr	Buzzr (4:3)
39.5	480i	WEST	WEST
39.6	480i	QVCPlus	QVC2

=== Analog-to-digital conversion ===
Because it was granted an original construction permit after the FCC finalized the DTV allotment plan on April 21, 1997, the station did not receive a companion channel for a digital television station. KKJB shut down its analog signal, over UHF channel 39, instead, on or before June 12, 2009. The station "flash-cut" its digital signal into operation UHF channel 39.

On November 30, 2018, KKJB switched from channel 39 to channel 15.

== Sister stations ==
Cocola Broadcasting also owns the following low-power stations in the Boise area:

- KBSE-LD 33
- KCBB-LD 41
- KIWB-LD 43
- KZAK-LD 49

Two other LPTV stations owned by Cocola, KKIC-LD and KEVA-LD, were sold to Bridge Media Networks and SagamoreHill Broadcasting, respectively.
