= List of television stations in Nevada =

This is a list of broadcast television stations that are licensed in the U.S. state of Nevada.

== Full-power ==
- Stations are arranged by media market served and channel position.

Full-power television stations in Nevada
Media market	Station	Channel	Primary affiliation(s)	Notes	Refs
Elko	KENV-DT	10	Roar		
Ely	KKEL	27	Story Television		
Las Vegas	KSNV	3	NBC		
Las Vegas	KVVU-TV	5	Fox	(Note: Licensed to Henderson, Nevada.)	
Las Vegas	KLAS-TV	8	CBS		
Las Vegas	KLVX	10	PBS		
Las Vegas	KTNV-TV	13	ABC		
Las Vegas	KINC	15	Univision		
Las Vegas	KHSV	21	MeTV		
Las Vegas	KVCW	33	The CW, MyNetworkTV on 33.2		
Las Vegas	KMCC	34	Independent, Ion Television on 34.2	(Note: Licensed to Laughlin, Nevada.)	
Las Vegas	KBLR	39	Telemundo, TeleXitos on 39.2	(Note: Licensed to Paradise, Nevada.)	
Reno	KTVN	2	CBS		
Reno	KRNV-DT	4	Roar		
Reno	KNPB	5	PBS		
Reno	KOLO-TV	8	ABC, The CW on 8.3		
Reno	KRXI-TV	11	Fox, NBC on 11.2		
Reno	KNSN-TV	21	MyNetworkTV		
Reno	KREN-TV	27	Univision		

== Low-power ==
Low-power television stations in Nevada
Media market	Station	Channel	Primary affiliation(s)	Notes	Refs
Carson City	K31KH-D	31	[Blank]	(Note: Licensed to Stateline, Nevada.)	
Carson City	K36NB-D	36	[Blank]		
Carson City	K24NS-D	38	[Blank]		
Ely	K22KB-D	3	Silent		
Las Vegas	KPVT-LD	2	Various		
Las Vegas	KLVG-LD	6	Diya TV		
Las Vegas	KDNU-LD	7	Various		
Las Vegas	KEEN-CD	17	CTN		
Las Vegas	KHMP-LD	18	Estrella TV		
Las Vegas	KHDF-CD	19	Various		
Las Vegas	KLVD-LD	23	Daystar		
Las Vegas	KPVM-LD	25	Independent	(Note: Licensed to Pahrump, Nevada.)	
Las Vegas	KGNG-LD	26	HSN, Spanish independent on 26.2		
Las Vegas	KELV-LD	27	UniMás		
Las Vegas	KVPX-LD	28	Defy TV		
Las Vegas	KEGS-LD	30	Various		
Las Vegas	KNBX-CD	31	Various		
Las Vegas	K36NE-D	43	Various		
Las Vegas	KLSV-LD	50	Various		
Las Vegas	KVGA-LD	51	Various		
Lovelock	KPHS-LD	14	PBS		
Moapa Valley	KMSQ-LD	15	[Blank]	(Note: Licensed to Mesquite, Nevada.)	
Reno	KCNL-LD	3	Estrella TV		
Reno	K06QX-D	6	[Blank]		
Reno	KRMF-LD	7	Estrella TV		
Reno	K10QX-D	10	Spanish religious		
Reno	K07AAI-D	12	Various		
Reno	KNRC-LD	14	3ABN	(Note: Licensed to Sparks, Nevada.)	
Reno	K05NL-D	15	Fun Roads		
Reno	KGLR-LD	35	Various		
Reno	KRNS-CD	46	UniMás		
Reno	KXNV-LD	26	Telemundo	(Note: Licensed to Incline Village, Nevada.)	

== Translators ==
Television station translators in Nevada
Media market	Station	Channel	Translating	Notes	Refs
Battle Mountain	K16FD-D	2	KTVN		
Battle Mountain	K21OS-D	2	KTVN	(Note: Licensed to Beowawe, Nevada.)	
Battle Mountain	K28LH-D	4	KRNV-DT		
Battle Mountain	K30LB-D	4	KTVX		
Battle Mountain	K14NU-D	5	KSL-TV		
Battle Mountain	K18JG-D	5	KNPB		
Battle Mountain	K19IU-D	5	KNPB		
Battle Mountain	K32CA-D	5	KNPB		
Battle Mountain	K22GM-D	8	KOLO-TV		
Battle Mountain	K26KG-D	8	KOLO-TV		
Battle Mountain	K36PN-D	8	KOLO-TV		
Battle Mountain	K13JD-D	11; 21	KRXI-TV		
Battle Mountain	K24JL-D	11; 21	KRXI-TV		
Battle Mountain	K42DZ-D	14	KJZZ-TV		
Battle Mountain	K11IY-D	30	KUCW		
Caliente–Pioche	K11CN-D	3	KSNV-DT		
Caliente–Pioche	K02EG-D	3	KSNV-DT	(Note: Licensed to Ursine, Nevada.)	
Caliente–Pioche	K03CM-D	3	KSNV-DT		
Caliente–Pioche	K30QE-D	3	KSNV-DT	(Note: Licensed to Panaca, Nevada.)	
Caliente–Pioche	K02JO-D	5	KVVU-TV		
Caliente–Pioche	K34QJ-D	5	KVVU-TV		
Caliente–Pioche	K11OW-D	5	KVVU-TV		
Caliente–Pioche	K13PU-D	5	KVVU-TV		
Caliente–Pioche	K09FL-D	8	KLAS-TV		
Caliente–Pioche	K06DM-D	8	KLAS-TV		
Caliente–Pioche	K09FK-D	8	KLAS-TV		
Caliente–Pioche	K09FJ-D	8	KLAS-TV		
Caliente–Pioche	K32OB-D	10	KLVX		
Caliente–Pioche	K36OF-D	10	KLVX		
Caliente–Pioche	K36PU-D	10	KLVX		
Caliente–Pioche	K36PX-D	10	KLVX		
Caliente–Pioche	K04HF-D	13	KTNV-TV		
Caliente–Pioche	K13LV-D	13	KTNV-TV		
Caliente–Pioche	K13LU-D	13	KTNV-TV		
Caliente–Pioche	K11IV-D	13	KTNV-TV		
Carson City	K29ES-D	5	KNPB		
Carson City	K17CA-D	11; 21	K34QQ-D		
Carson City	K19MK-D	21	KNSN-TV	(Note: Licensed to Lake Tahoe, Nevada.)	
Carson City	K32GW-D	21	KNSN-TV		
Elko	K06MK-D	2	KTVN		
Elko	K06NY-D	2	KTVN	(Note: Licensed to Ryndon, Nevada.)	
Elko	K25FR-D	2	KTVN		
Elko	K36HA-D	2	KTVN		
Elko	K26OE-D	4	KTVX		
Elko	K32GK-D	4	KTVX		
Elko	K15EE-D	5	KNPB		
Elko	K16FV-D	5	KNPB		
Elko	K23FC-D	5	KNPB		
Elko	K08LS-D	8	KOLO-TV		
Elko	K08NQ-D	8	KOLO-TV		
Elko	K12MS-D	10	KENV-DT		
Elko	K12PT-D	10	KENV-DT		
Elko	K17DT-D	11	KRXI-TV		
Elko	K18GT-D	11	KRXI-TV		
Elko	K05JU-D	14	KJZZ-TV		
Elko	K19FZ-D	14	KJZZ-TV		
Elko	K24NB-D	21	KNSN-TV		
Elko	K28PJ-D	30	KUCW		
Elko	K34HE-D	30	KUCW		
Ely	K09EA-D	2	KUTV	(Note: Licensed to McGill, Nevada.)	
Ely	K32CJ-D	2	KUTV		
Ely	K18KA-D	2	KTVN		
Ely	K36LU-D	4	KRNV-DT		
Ely	K07DU-D	4	KTVX		
Ely	K34CM-D	4	KTVX		
Ely	K11EE-D	5	KSL-TV		
Ely	K30CN-D	5	KSL-TV		
Ely	K06HT-D	5	KVVU-TV		
Ely	K28IZ-D	5	KVVU-TV		
Ely	K14AL-D	8	KOLO-TV		
Ely	K17NT-D	8	KLAS-TV	(Note: Licensed to Ely and McGill, Nevada.)	
Ely	K24GY-D	8	KLAS-TV		
Ely	K13NR-D	10	KLVX		
Ely	K26HY-D	10	KLVX		
Ely	K16NB-D	11	KRXI-TV		
Ely	K20LD-D	11	KRXI-TV		
Eureka	K17NV-D	2	KTVN		
Eureka	K21GJ-D	4	KTVX		
Eureka	K23LF-D	4	KRNV-DT		
Eureka	K25PP-D	4	KRNV-DT		
Eureka	K26JY-D	4	KTVX	(Note: Licensed to Duckwater, Nevada.)	
Eureka	K15LU-D	5	KVVU-TV		
Eureka	K19IM-D	5	KNPB		
Eureka	K31LO-D	5	KNPB		
Eureka	K35KM-D	5	KVVU-TV		
Eureka	K33PI-D	5	KNPB		
Eureka	K14OB-D	8	KOLO-TV		
Eureka	K27NN-D	8	KOLO-TV		
Eureka	K16IZ-D	11; 21	KRXI-TV		
Eureka	K29NK-D	11; 21	KRXI-TV		
Eureka	K22NG-D	13	KTNV-TV		
Eureka	K28LM-D	21	KNSN-TV		
Eureka	K36KN-D	21	KNSN-TV		
Hawthorne	K14JY-D	2	KTVN	(Note: Licensed to Walker Lake, Nevada.)	
Hawthorne	K29MG-D	2	KTVN		
Hawthorne	K34LE-D	2	KTVN	(Note: Licensed to Schurz, Nevada.)	
Hawthorne	K20FR-D	4	KRNV-DT		
Hawthorne	K28GX-D	4	KRNV-DT		
Hawthorne	K28PP-D	4	KRNV-DT		
Hawthorne	K15LG-D	5	KNPB		
Hawthorne	K19LS-D	5	KNPB		
Hawthorne	K30PB-D	5	KNPB		
Hawthorne	K23OK-D	8	KOLO-TV		
Hawthorne	K30FS-D	8	KOLO-TV		
Hawthorne	K32CQ-D	8	KOLO-TV		
Hawthorne	K22FH-D	11	KRXI-TV		
Hawthorne	K24EY-D	11	KRXI-TV		
Hawthorne	K36FF-D	11	KRXI-TV		
Hawthorne	K17FR-D	21	KNSN-TV		
Hawthorne	K35AX-D	21	KNSN-TV		
Hawthorne	K26JC-D	27	KREN-TV		
Hawthorne	K33GZ-D	27	KREN-TV		
Las Vegas	K08PG-D	10	KLVX	(Note: Licensed to Indian Springs, Nevada.)	
Las Vegas	K34LI-D	10	KLVX	(Note: Licensed to Jean, Nevada.)	
Laughlin	K28EU-D	5	KVVU-TV		
Laughlin	K22DR-D	8	KLAS-TV		
Laughlin	K06PG-D	10	KLVX		
Laughlin	K20NW-D	13	KTNV-TV		
Laughlin	KNTL-LD	15	KINC		
Lovelock	K24FF-D	2	KTVN		
Lovelock	K30DS-D	4	KRNV-DT		
Lovelock	K18DP-D	5	KNPB		
Lovelock	K28QC-D	8	KOLO-TV	(Note: Licensed to Imlay, Nevada.)	
Lovelock	K34BL-D	11; 21	K34QQ-D		
Lovelock	K36GL-D	11; 21	K34QQ-D		
Lund–Preston	K10BU-D	2	KUTV		
Lund–Preston	K29NH-D	2	KTVN		
Lund–Preston	K16LG-D	4	KRNV-DT		
Lund–Preston	K08CB-D	4	KTVX		
Lund–Preston	K12DE-D	5	KSL-TV		
Lund–Preston	K23ON-D	5	KVVU-TV		
Lund–Preston	K25PX-D	8	KLAS-TV		
Lund–Preston	K27OH-D	10	KLVX		
Lund–Preston	K21OK-D	11	KRXI-TV		
Manhattan	K12MW-D	2	KTVN		
Manhattan	K10LQ-D	4	KRNV-DT		
Manhattan	K06KQ-D	11	KRXI-TV		
McDermitt	K28PB-D	2	KBOI-TV		
McDermitt	K20NT-D	4	KAID		
McDermitt	K16JZ-D	6	KIVI-TV		
McDermitt	K14SE-D	7	KTVB		
McDermitt	K18NG-D	9	KNIN-TV		
Mina	K10GT-D	2	KTVN		
Mina	K34PY-D	4	KRNV-DT		
Mina	K25PU-D	5	KNPB		
Mina	K05AF-D	8	KOLO-TV		
Mina	K16FU-D	8	KOLO-TV		
Mina	K32NW-D	11	KRXI-TV		
Mina	K27OI-D	21	KNSN-TV		
Mina	K18GG-D	27	KREN-TV		
Moapa Valley	K14ND-D	3	KSNV-DT	(Note: Licensed to Overton, Nevada.)	
Moapa Valley	K46HG-D	3	KSNV-DT		
Moapa Valley	K48ID-D	4	KTVX		
Moapa Valley	K34ME-D	5	KVVU-TV		
Moapa Valley	K38PC-D	5	KSL-TV		
Moapa Valley	K18IP-D	8	KLAS-TV		
Moapa Valley	K08PE-D	10	KLVX	(Note: Licensed to Alamo, Nevada.)	
Moapa Valley	K25LU-D	10	KLVX		
Moapa Valley	K27JK-D	10	KLVX	(Note: Licensed to Glendale, Nevada.)	
Moapa Valley	K20JV-D	11	KBYU-TV		
Moapa Valley	K30MH-D	13	KTNV-TV		
Moapa Valley	K44GU-D	33	KVCW		
Moapa Valley	K33OK-D	50	KINC		
Orovada	K29KJ-D	2	KTVN		
Orovada	K27MF-D	5	KNPB		
Orovada	K34MF-D	8	KOLO-TV		
Orovada	K32KQ-D	11	KRXI-TV		
Pahrump	K17CL-D	3	KSNV-DT		
Pahrump	K33MJ-D	3	KSNV-DT		
Pahrump	K18NA-D	5	KVVU-TV		
Pahrump	K19BU-D	5	KVVU-TV		
Pahrump	K24BY-D	8	KLAS-TV		
Pahrump	K30PR-D	8	KLAS-TV		
Pahrump	K28CS-D	10	KLVX		
Pahrump	K31OY-D	13	KTNV-TV		
Pahrump	K36BQ-D	13	KTNV-TV		
Pahrump	K20MC-D	21	KHSV		
Reno	K29BN-D	2	KTVN	(Note: Licensed to Silver Springs, Nevada.)	
Reno	K33ER-D	2	KTVN	(Note: Licensed to Verdi and Mogul, Nevada.)	
Reno	K27OD-D	4	KRNV-DT		
Reno	K33IB-D	4	KRNV-DT		
Reno	K34QL-D	4	KRNV-DT	(Note: Licensed to Fallon, Nevada.)	
Reno	K31BM-D	5	KNPB		
Reno	K36OB-D	5	KNPB	(Note: Licensed to Verdi, Nevada.)	
Reno	K24IB-D	8	KOLO-TV		
Reno	K28PX-D	8	KOLO-TV	(Note: Licensed to Stead, Nevada.)	
Reno	K22JC-D	11; 21	K34QQ-D		
Reno	K25PQ-D	11; 21	K34QQ-D		
Reno	K19MJ-D	11; 21	KRXI-TV	(Note: Licensed to Yerington, Nevada.)	
Reno	K30HY-D	11; 21	KRXI-TV		
Reno	K02QW-D	13	KQSL		
Reno	K16GM-D	21	KNSN-TV		
Reno	K35FL-D	21	KNSN-TV		
Reno	KEVO-LD	40	KQSL		
Ruth	K09DW-D	2	KUTV		
Ruth	K19MM-D	2	KTVN		
Ruth	K21OJ-D	4	KRNV-DT		
Ruth	K07DV-D	4	KTVX		
Ruth	K11ED-D	5	KSL-TV		
Ruth	K15LY-D	5	KVVU-TV		
Ruth	K03DS-D	8	KLAS-TV		
Ruth	K13NQ-D	10	KLVX		
Ruth	K17NU-D	11	KRXI-TV		
Wells	K08IO-D	2	KTVN		
Wells	K20JQ-D	5	KNPB		
Wells	K35OI-D	8	KOLO-TV	(Note: Licensed to Starr Valley, Nevada.)	
Wells	K24GE-D	10	KENV-DT		
Wells	K22GW-D	14	KJZZ-TV		
Wells	K26JB-D	30	KUCW		
Winnemucca	K22NU-D	2	KTVN	(Note: Licensed to Golconda, Nevada.)	
Winnemucca	K36PO-D	2	KTVN		
Winnemucca	K20OD-D	2	KTVN	(Note: Licensed to Valmy, Nevada.)	
Winnemucca	K21FO-D	4	KRNV-DT		
Winnemucca	K29EV-D	4	KRNV-DT		
Winnemucca	K32NR-D	4	KRNV-DT		
Winnemucca	K31FU-D	4	KRNV-DT		
Winnemucca	K15AL-D	5	KNPB		
Winnemucca	K24NQ-D	5	KNPB		
Winnemucca	K25IW-D	5	KNPB		
Winnemucca	K19EU-D	7	KTVB		
Winnemucca	K35GD-D	7	KTVB		
Winnemucca	K26GG-D	8	KOLO-TV		
Winnemucca	K30PX-D	8	KOLO-TV		
Winnemucca	K23FR-D	11	KRXI-TV		
Winnemucca	K27OM-D	11	KRXI-TV		
Winnemucca	K33GB-D	11	KRXI-TV		
Winnemucca	K34FP-D	11	KRXI-TV		
Winnemucca	K17HB-D	21	KNSN-TV		

== Defunct ==
- KEKO Elko (1973–1975)
- KEGS Goldfield (2002–2009)
- KTUD-CD Las Vegas (1999–2013)
- KWNV Winnemucca (1998–2008)
