= KRRN =

- Moapa Valley, Nevada; United States
- Broadcast area: Las Vegas Valley; Mesquite, Nevada; St. George, Utah
- Frequency: 92.7 MHz (HD Radio)
- Branding: Fuego 92.7

Programming
- Format: Bilingual Rhythmic Contemporary

Ownership
- Owner: Entravision Communications; (Entravision Holdings, LLC)
- Sister stations: KQRT, KRNV-FM, KELV-LD, KREN-TV, KRNS-CD

History
- First air date: November 1, 1990
- Former call signs: KAWA (1985–1989); KRCY (1989–2002); KQRT (2002–2003)

Technical information
- Licensing authority: FCC
- Facility ID: 27982
- Class: C
- ERP: 100,000 watts
- HAAT: 587 meters (1,926 ft)
- Transmitter coordinates: 36°36′4″N 114°35′6″W

Links
- Public license information: Public file; LMS
- Webcast: Listen live
- Website: KRRN Online

KRRN (92.7 MHz, "Fuego 92.7") is a commercial FM radio station licensed to Moapa Valley, Nevada, and serving the Las Vegas metropolitan area. It broadcasts a Bilingual (English and Spanish) Rhythmic Contemporary format and is owned by Entravision Communications. The studios and offices are on East Pilot Road in Las Vegas, near Harry Reid International Airport.

KRRN has an effective radiated power (ERP) of 100,000 watts, the maximum for non-grandfathered FM stations. The transmitter is in Moapa Valley, off Interstate 15. Programming is also heard on 20,000 watt booster station KRRN-2 on 92.7 MHz in Las Vegas.

== History ==
In 1983, the Federal Communications Commission granted an application to Hualapai Broadcasters to build a new radio station on 105.9 MHz in Kingman, Arizona. The station went on air November 1, 1990, as KRCY with an oldies format.

In 2001, Spectrum Scan LLC purchased KRCY from Hualapai for $4 million. A translator was added in Las Vegas before Entravision acquired KRCY the next year for moving in to Las Vegas. It then changed the station's call sign to KQRT before announcing that it would move KRRN and its Spanish-language contemporary hit radio format from 105.1 MHz to 92.7 MHz.

The Fuego brand was rolled out to Las Vegas on March 29, 2021, replacing adult contemporary La Suavecita. Previous formats include adult hits as José, Regional Mexican El Gato ("The Cat"), and Spanish contemporary hit radio as Súper Estrella.

== Previous logos ==
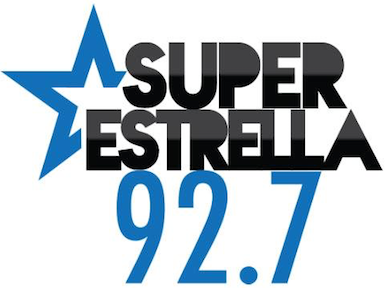
