= KRNV =

KRNV may refer to:

- KRNV-DT, a television station (channel 12 / virtual 4) licensed to Reno, Nevada, United States
- KRNV-FM, a radio station (102.1 FM) licensed to Reno, Nevada, United States
- Cleveland Municipal Airport (Mississippi) in Cleveland, Mississippi (ICAO code KRNV)
