= KRNV-DT =

Television station in Reno, Nevada

- Reno, Nevada; United States
- Channels: Digital: 12 (VHF); Virtual: 4

Programming
- Affiliations: 4.1: Roar; for others, see § Subchannels

Ownership
- Owner: Cunningham Broadcasting; (Reno (KRNV-TV) Licensee, Inc.)
- Operator: Sinclair Broadcast Group
- Sister stations: KNSN-TV, KRXI-TV

History
- First air date: September 30, 1962
- Former call signs: KCRL (1962–1969); KCRL-TV (1969–1982); KCRL (1982–1990); KRNV (1990–2009)
- Former channel numbers: Analog: 4 (VHF, 1962–2009); Digital: 7 (VHF, until 2019)
- Former affiliations: NBC (1962–2025); ABC (secondary, 1962–1967)
- Call sign meaning: Reno, Nevada

Technical information
- Licensing authority: FCC
- Facility ID: 60307
- ERP: 19 kW
- HAAT: 891.4 m (2,925 ft)
- Transmitter coordinates: 39°18′56.2″N 119°53′6″W
- Translator(s): see § Translators

Links
- Public license information: Public file; LMS

KRNV-DT (channel 4) is a television station in Reno, Nevada, United States, airing programming from the digital multicast network Roar. It is owned by Cunningham Broadcasting and operated by Sinclair Broadcast Group alongside Fox/NBC affiliate KRXI-TV (channel 11) and sports-focused independent station KNSN-TV (channel 21). The three outlets share studios on Vassar Street in Reno; KRNV-DT's transmitter is located on Slide Mountain.

Channel 4 in Reno began broadcasting in 1962 as KCRL, the city's second TV station. Founded by E. L. Cord and owned after his 1974 death by his estate and charitable foundation, it was an NBC affiliate from the moment it began broadcasting. The station was purchased by Sunbelt Communications Company in 1989 and relaunched the next year as KRNV, including an overhaul of the station's local newscasts. This was successful at moving KRNV from third to second place locally. Sunbelt also embarked on several extensions of the KRNV brand, including rebroadcasters in Northern Nevada and a news/talk radio station in the Reno area.

In 2013, Sinclair acquired KRNV's non-license assets and began operating the station; Cunningham eventually acquired the license. On December 1, 2025, Sinclair moved the NBC affiliation and programming to a subchannel of KRXI-TV.

== History ==
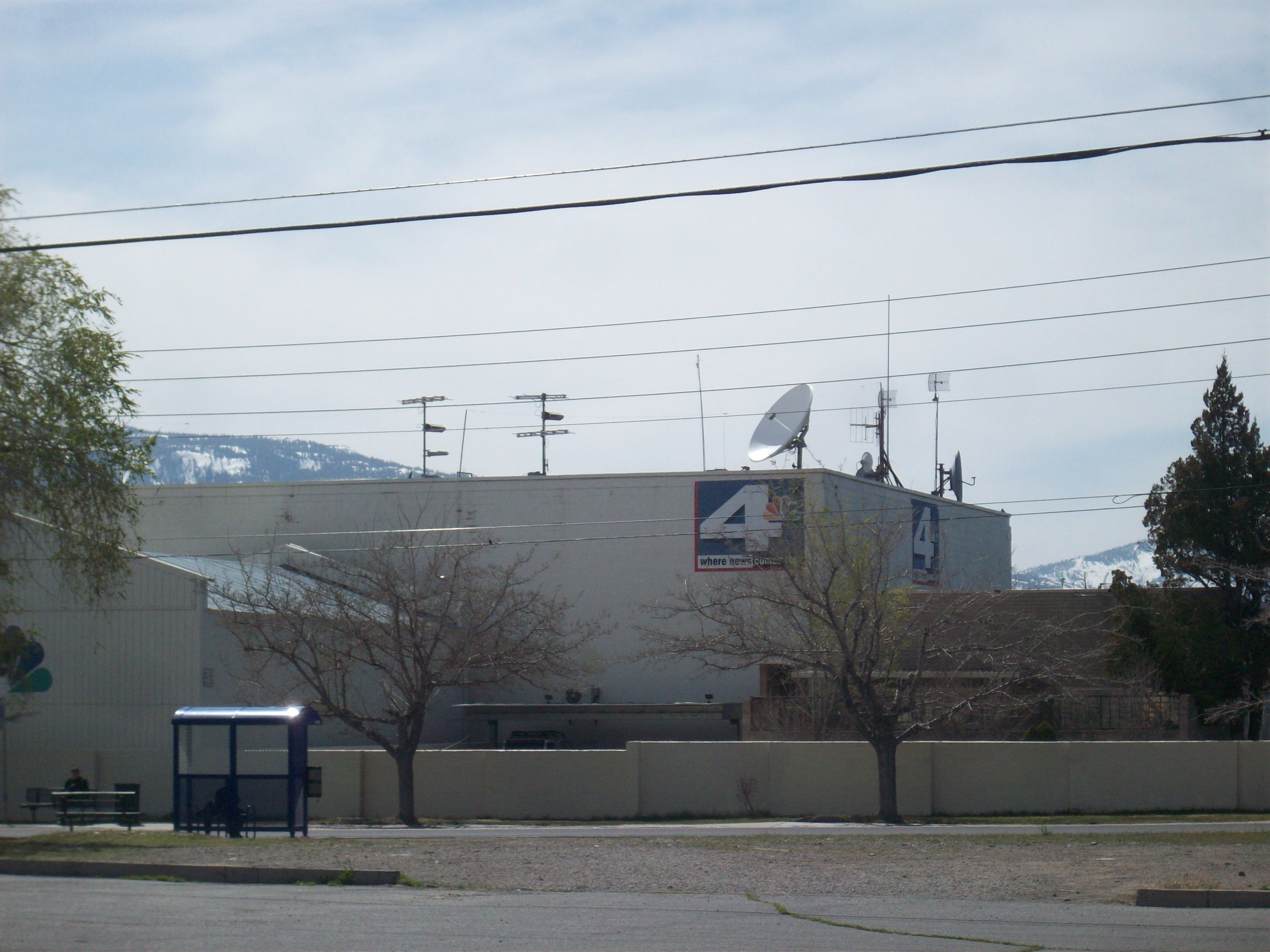
KRNV studios in Reno

=== KCRL: Circle L years ===
The first application for channel 4 in Reno was made by Western Television Company in January 1953. The Federal Communications Commission (FCC) granted an application made by Nevada Telecasting Corporation in April 1955. Soon after, it emerged that Nevada Telecasting had misrepresented its ownership to the commission and there were additional undisclosed parties in interest. A Zephyr Cove man, Charles E. Halstead, filed for the channel in 1956; Halstead had been the owner of radio station KDIA in Auburn, California, whose broadcast license had been canceled in 1953. In March 1958, an FCC examiner recommended revoking the Nevada Telecasting permit, which the commission did in June 1959.

E. L. Cord—a businessman, Nevada state senator, and owner of KFAC in Los Angeles—asked the FCC to insert channel 11 at Reno in July 1958, while channel 4 was mired in litigation. After the revocation of Nevada Telecasting's permit, Cord applied for channel 4 on June 25, 1959, with Halstead and the Electron Corporation of Dallas also seeking the permit. Six applicants sought the channel, but all except Cord's Circle L, Inc., had withdrawn by 1961, when an FCC hearing examiner recommended Cord's application; the FCC awarded the construction permit on June 15, 1961.

In 1962, Circle L began constructing a studio and offices at Vassar Street and Harvard Way, and approval was received to erect an antenna in rural Washoe County. The station began broadcasting on September 30, 1962, as KCRL. In addition to NBC, the station split ABC programming with Reno's first station, KOLO-TV (channel 8), until 1967, when KTVN (channel 2) debuted.

Under a separate corporation, the Cord family started a radio station, KCRL (780 AM), in October 1970. The station was sold in 1981 and became KROW.

Cord died in 1974, setting off a years-long court dispute for control of his estate. A preliminary sale agreement was reached with 20th Century Fox for a $17.5 million acquisition of KCRL in 1980. At the time, Chris-Craft Industries owned a 19-percent stake in 20th Century Fox. Between them, they already owned the limit of five very high frequency (VHF) stations, creating possible legal issues for any attempt by Fox to purchase stations.

=== KRNV: Sunbelt ownership ===
Beginning in 1983, Washoe Broadcasting Company—a company partly owned by James Rogers which also owned KVBC in Las Vegas—made a concerted effort to take control of channel 4. On September 1, it filed an application for a new station to broadcast on channel 4 at Reno. Washoe Broadcasting urged the FCC to hold hearings pitting it against Circle L for the right to use channel 4. It also sought to force the Cord Foundation to sell its 90-percent stake in Circle L, Inc. It contended that the Cord Foundation's management of the station was so poor and underperforming as to not fulfill its fiduciary duty to the estate. The owner of the other 10 percent, estate co-executor Charles Cord, died in 1986 at the age of 70.

The Cord Foundation put KCRL on the market in February 1989. In July 1989, after two months of negotiations, the Cord Foundation signed a deal with Sunbelt to sell the station for $27 million. Sunbelt was attracted to KCRL because it was an NBC affiliate with obvious possible efficiencies and synergy with its Las Vegas station, also an NBC affiliate. The move promised major changes for KCRL, long Reno's third-rated local TV station. Over the course of the 1980s, Sunbelt had turned KVBC from a distant second place to fighting for the market lead.

Upon taking control in October, Sunbelt replaced the station's management and several on-air staffers. Among those dismissed was John Firpo, who had been news director and 6:30 p.m. news anchor for 26 years. Sunbelt also applied for new KRNV call letters for channel 4.

On January 22, 1990, the station officially relaunched as KRNV and overhauled its newscasts. Only three news anchors were held over from the pre-Sunbelt operation. By 1994, KRNV's newscasts had placed second overall in several ratings surveys; the addition of the market's only 5 p.m. newscast proved to be successful, leading the local ratings in its time slot.

In 1994, Sunbelt purchased Reno radio station KTHX (101.7 FM). On July 11, KRNV-FM debuted, mixing local morning and daytime rolling news coverage with audio simulcasts of the television station's 5 p.m., 6 p.m., and 11 p.m. newscasts. The concept was replicated in Las Vegas, where Sunbelt's KVBC provided news to and leased the time of KRBO beginning in 1995. That station later changed its call sign to KVBC-FM. Sunbelt exited radio in December 1999, and EXCL Communications began programming the stations with Spanish-language formats.

Another way Sunbelt sought to expand KRNV was building semi-satellite stations in rural Northern Nevada. From studios at Great Basin College in Elko, KENV (channel 10) began broadcasting in March 1997; it broadcast KRNV's programming with morning news inserts for the Elko area. KENV continued to air NBC programming until December 31, 2017, when NBC refused to renew its affiliation because Elko is assigned to the Salt Lake City TV market, in which the NBC affiliate is KSL-TV. Another such station, KWNV (channel 7) in Winnemucca, operated from 1998 to 2008, when it was closed down for economic reasons.

On December 19, 2006, KRNV began broadcasting its local newscasts in high definition, making it the first station in the market to do so. Sunbelt eventually changed its name to Intermountain West Communications Company.

=== Sinclair ownership ===
On November 22, 2013, Sinclair Broadcast Group announced the acquisition of KRNV's non-license assets for $26 million. Sinclair already owned KRXI-TV and operated KAME-TV in Reno. The station licensee entered at that time into joint sales and shared services agreements with Sinclair. Cunningham Broadcasting then filed on December 19, 2013, to purchase the license assets of KRNV and KENV for $6.5 million—a transaction the FCC did not approve until September 22, 2017. While the sale remained pending, Rogers announced that his bladder cancer had recurred; he died in June.

On December 1, 2025, the NBC affiliation was moved to KRXI-TV's second subchannel, while KRNV's main channel flipped to Roar with reasons cited including the continued rollout of ATSC 3.0 in the Reno area. On January 18, 2026, the KRXI-TV antenna experienced a transmission line failure; KRNV-DT is temporarily broadcasting KRXI-Fox and KRXI-NBC from its transmitter. Sinclair estimated it would take two months to put KRXI-TV back into service.

=== Notable former on-air staff ===
- Bonnie Bernstein – sports anchor
- Contessa Brewer – general assignment reporter
- Troy Hayden – reporter and anchor, 1991–1994

== Technical information ==
=== Subchannels ===
KRNV-DT's transmitter is located on Slide Mountain. The station's signal is multiplexed:

Subchannels of KRNV-DT with KRXI-TV off air
Subchannel	Res.	Short name	Programming
4.1	480i	ROAR	Roar
4.3	480i	Antenna	Antenna TV
4.4	480i	Rewind	Rewind TV
11.1	720p	FOX	KRXI–Fox
11.2	1080i	NBC	KRXI–NBC

In normal service, as of January 2026, the station carried the following channels:

Subchannels of KRNV-DT
Subchannel	Res.	Short name	Programming
4.1	480i	ROAR	Roar
4.2	480i	Comet	Comet
4.3	480i	Antenna	Antenna TV
4.4	480i	Rewind	Rewind TV
21.1	720p	KNSN-TV	Sports programming / MyNetworkTV (KNSN-TV)

Broadcast on behalf of another station

=== Analog-to-digital conversion ===
KRNV shut down its analog signal, over VHF channel 4, on June 12, 2009, the official date on which full-power television stations in the United States transitioned from analog to digital broadcasts under federal mandate. The station's digital signal remained on its pre-transition VHF channel 7, using virtual channel 4.

KRNV-DT relocated its signal from channel 7 to channel 12 on July 3, 2020, as a result of the 2016 United States wireless spectrum auction.

=== Translators ===
KRNV-DT's signal is additionally rebroadcast over the following translators:

- Beowawe: K24JL-D
- Beowawe: K28LH-D
- Ely: K36LU-D
- Eureka: K23LF-D
- Eureka: K25PP-D
- Fallon: K34QL-D
- Hawthorne: K20FR-D
- Lovelock: K30DS-D
- Lund, Preston: K16LG-D
- Manhattan: K10LQ-D
- Mina, Luning: K30DS-D
- Ruth: K21OJ-D
- Schurz: K28PP-D
- Silver Springs: K33IB-D
- Susanville, etc., CA: K31IE-D
- Valmy: K29EV-D
- Verdi, Mogul: K27OD-D
- Walker Lake: K28GX-D
- Winnemucca: K21FO-D, K32NR-D
