= NBC 10 =

NBC 10 may refer to one of the following television stations in the United States:

== Current ==
=== Owned-and-operated stations ===
- WBTS-CD in Nashua, New Hampshire / Boston, Massachusetts (cable channel; broadcasts on channel 15)
- WCAU in Philadelphia, Pennsylvania

=== Affiliated stations ===
- KMOT in Minot, North Dakota
- KTEN in Ada, Oklahoma / Sherman, Texas
- KTTC in Rochester/Austin, Minnesota
- KTVE in El Dorado, Arkansas / Monroe, Louisiana
- WALB in Albany, Georgia
- WAVY-TV in Portsmouth/Norfolk/Newport News, Virginia
- WBIR-TV in Knoxville, Tennessee
- WGEM-TV in Quincy, Illinois / Hannibal, Missouri
- WHEC-TV in Rochester, New York
- WILX-TV in Onondaga/Jackson/Lansing, Michigan
- WIS in Columbia, South Carolina
- WJAR in Providence, Rhode Island
- WSLS-TV in Roanoke/Lynchburg, Virginia

== Former ==
- KAKE in Wichita, Kansas (1954 to 1956)
- KENV-DT in Elko, Nevada (1997 to 2018)
- KERO-TV in Bakersfield, California (1953 to 1963)
- KFSD-TV/KOGO-TV/KGTV in San Diego, California (1953 to 1977)
- KMED/KTVL in Medford, Oregon (1961 to 1983)
- WALA-TV in Mobile, Alabama (1953 to 1996)
- WSZE in Saipan, Northern Mariana Islands
  - Was a satellite of KUAM-TV in Hagåtña, Guam
- WTTV in Bloomington, Indiana (1949 to 1954)
