= CW46 =

CW46 may refer to one of current or former The CW Television Network affiliates:

- WBSF Bay City/Saginaw/Flint, Michigan (Affiliate)
- KRNS-CD Reno, Nevada (Affiliate)
- WJZY Former CW affiliate of Belmont/Charlotte, North Carolina (Now Fox Affiliate)
