= KGNG =

KGNG may refer to:

- KGNG-LD, a low-power television station (channel 26) licensed to serve Las Vegas, Nevada, United States
- KGNG-LP, a defunct low-power television station (channel 47) formerly licensed to serve Las Vegas, Nevada
- the ICAO code for Gooding Municipal Airport in Gooding, Idaho, United States
