= UPN 9 =

UPN 9 can refer to the following stations formerly affiliated with UPN:

- KNIN-TV in Boise, now affiliated with Fox
- KMSP-TV in Minneapolis-St. Paul, now owned-and-operated by Fox
- KUSI-TV in San Diego, now an independent station (cable channel, broadcasts on channel 51)
- WWOR-TV in New York City, now with MyNetworkTV
- WCTX in Hartford-New Haven, now with MyNetworkTV (cable channel, broadcasts on channel 59)
