= KNSN-TV =

Television station in Reno, Nevada

ATSC 3.0 station
- Reno, Nevada; United States
- Channels: Digital: 20 (UHF); Virtual: 21
- Branding: Nevada Sports Net

Programming
- Affiliations: 21.1: Independent with MyNetworkTV; 21.2: The Nest; 21.3: [Blank]

Ownership
- Owner: Sinclair Broadcast Group; (KNSN Licensee, LLC)
- Sister stations: KRNV-DT, KRXI-TV

History
- First air date: October 11, 1981
- Former call signs: KAME-TV (1981–2019)
- Former channel numbers: Analog: 21 (UHF, 1981–2009)
- Former affiliations: Independent (1981–1986); Fox (1986–1996); UPN (secondary 1995–1996; primary 1996–2006); MyNetworkTV (primary, 2006–2018)
- Call sign meaning: Nevada Sports Net

Technical information
- Licensing authority: FCC
- Facility ID: 19191
- ERP: 53 kW
- HAAT: 176 m (577 ft)
- Transmitter coordinates: 39°35′3″N 119°47′55″W
- Translator(s): see § Translators

Links
- Public license information: Public file; LMS
- Website: nevadasportsnet.com

KNSN-TV (channel 21) is a primary sports-formatted independent television station in Reno, Nevada, United States, which has a secondary affiliation with MyNetworkTV. It is owned by Sinclair Broadcast Group alongside dual Fox/NBC affiliate KRXI-TV (channel 11) and operated with KRNV-DT (channel 4). The three stations share studios on Vassar Street in Reno; KNSN-TV's transmitter is located on Red Hill between US 395 and SR 445 in Sun Valley, Nevada.

== History ==
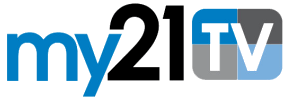
Previous logo of KAME-TV as a primary MyNetworkTV affiliate.

The station launched on October 11, 1981, as KAME-TV, an independent station airing movies (TV-21's The Big Movie), cartoons, westerns, and sitcoms. On October 9, 1986, it became a charter Fox affiliate. On January 16, 1995, KAME-TV picked up UPN on a secondary basis; it became a full-time UPN affiliate on January 1, 1996, after KRXI signed-on and took Fox. Between September 1996 and May 1997, the station was briefly owned by Raycom Media. With the 2006 shutdown and merge of The WB and UPN to form The CW, the station joined News Corporation–owned and Fox sister network MyNetworkTV on September 5, 2006.

On July 20, 2012, one day after Cox Media Group purchased WAWS and WTEV in Jacksonville, Florida, and KOKI-TV and KMYT-TV in Tulsa, Oklahoma, from Newport Television, Cox put KRXI-TV (along with the local marketing agreement (LMA) for KAME-TV) and sister stations WTOV-TV in Steubenville, Ohio, WJAC-TV in Johnstown, Pennsylvania, and KFOX-TV in El Paso, Texas (all in markets that are smaller than Tulsa), plus several radio stations in medium to small markets, on the selling block. On February 25, 2013, Cox announced that it would sell the four television stations, and the LMA for KAME, to Sinclair Broadcast Group; as part of the deal, Ellis Communications would sell KAME-TV to Deerfield Media. The Federal Communications Commission (FCC) granted its approval on April 30, 2013, one day after it approved the sale of sister station, KRXI. The sale was finalized on May 2, 2013. Sinclair would subsequently purchase the non-license assets of a third Reno station, KRNV-DT, on November 22, 2013. Sinclair could not buy KRNV-DT outright because Reno has only six full-power stations—three too few to legally permit a duopoly. With the sale of KRNV's license to Cunningham, Sinclair now controlled half of those stations. The sale also created a situation in which a Fox affiliate was the nominal senior partner in a duopoly involving an NBC affiliate and a "Big Three" station.

On August 31, 2018, Sinclair announced that KAME-TV would relaunch as "Nevada Sports Net", which would feature extended coverage of Nevada Wolf Pack athletics, as well as the Reno Aces and the Mountain West Conference. The station would continue to air MyNetworkTV on a secondary basis. The new format launched on September 10. At that time, NSN took over KRNV's sports department. On July 15, 2019, the station's call sign was changed to KNSN-TV. On July 25, 2023, the station converted to ATSC 3.0.

On September 21, 2023, NSN acquired the local television rights to the Vegas Golden Knights. Coverage is produced by Scripps Sports.

On July 5, 2025, Sinclair announced that it would acquire KNSN outright, re-creating a duopoly with KRXI. The sale was completed on August 18.

== Technical information ==
=== Subchannels ===
The station's ATSC 1.0 channels are carried on the multiplexed signals of other Reno television stations:

Subchannels provided by KNSN-TV (ATSC 1.0)
Channel	Res.	Short name	Programming	ATSC 1.0 host
21.1	720p	KNSN-TV	Sports programming / MyNetworkTV	KRNV-DT
21.2	480i	TheNest	The Nest	KRNV-DT
21.3	480i	Comet	[Blank]	KTVN

=== ATSC 3.0 lighthouse ===
Subchannels of KNSN-TV (ATSC 3.0)
Channel	Res.	Short name	Programming
2.1	1080p	2 CBS	CBS (KTVN)
4.1	1080p	News4	Roar (KRNV-DT)
8.1	720p	KOLO-TV	ABC (KOLO-TV)
11.1	720p	FOX11	Fox (KRXI-TV)
21.1	720p	KNSN-TV	Sports programming / MyNetworkTV
21.10	1080p	T2	T2
21.11		PBTV	Pickleballtv

Subchannel broadcast with digital rights management
Subchannel streamed via the Internet

=== Translators ===
- K32GW-D Carson City
- K24NB-D Elko
- K28LM-D Eureka
- K36KN-D Eureka
- K35AX-D Hawthorne
- K19MK-D Lake Tahoe
- K27OI-D Mina–Luning
- K35FL-D Silver Springs
- K27NE-D Susanville, etc., CA
- K34QQ-D Tahoe City, CA
- K17FR-D Walker Lake
- K17HB-D Winnemucca
- K16GM-D Yerington

=== Analog-to-digital conversion ===
KNSN-TV (as KAME-TV) shut down its analog signal, over UHF channel 21, on February 17, 2009, the original target date on which full-power television stations in the United States were to transition from analog to digital broadcasts under federal mandate (which was later pushed back to June 12, 2009). The station's digital signal remained on its pre-transition UHF channel 20, using virtual channel 21.
