= KQRT =

- Las Vegas, Nevada; United States
- Broadcast area: Las Vegas Valley
- Frequency: 105.1 MHz (HD Radio)
- Branding: La Tricolor 105.1

Programming
- Format: Regional Mexican

Ownership
- Owner: Entravision Communications; (Entravision Holdings, LLC)
- Sister stations: KRRN; KRNV-FM; KELV-LD; KREN-TV; KRNS-CD

History
- First air date: September 1993
- Former call signs: KRBO (1993–1996); KVBC-FM (1996–2000); KRRN (2000–2003)
- Call sign meaning: For "Radio Tricolor"

Technical information
- Licensing authority: FCC
- Facility ID: 51731
- Class: C2
- ERP: 50,000 watts
- HAAT: 19 meters (62 ft)
- Transmitter coordinates: 36°19′59″N 115°21′44″W

Links
- Public license information: Public file; LMS
- Website: elboton.com/las-vegas/radiolatricolor

KQRT (La Tricolor 105.1 FM) is a radio station broadcasting a regional Mexican format in Las Vegas, Nevada, United States. The station is owned by Entravision Holdings, LLC, a subsidiary of Entravision Communications. Its studios are in the unincorporated community of Paradise in Clark County near Harry Reid International Airport, and its transmitter is on the northwest edge of the Las Vegas Valley.

KQRT began broadcasting in 1993 as KRBO with an oldies format. From 1995 to 1999, the station was run as a news/talk outlet in a relationship with local television station KVBC. After being sold, it changed to a Spanish-language operation and adopted its present format in 2003.

== History ==
On April 13, 1989, the Federal Communications Commission granted a construction permit to the Patmor Broadcast Group, a consortium of two formerly competing applicants for the frequency that included Washington lawyers, a businessman from Wisconsin, and Frank Sinatra. More than four years passed before the station went on the air as KRBO in September 1993, airing an oldies format.

The oldies format continued for two years before Compass Communications, owned by Gerald Proctor, took over operations of the frequency under a local marketing agreement in 1995. The station then contracted with Radio News Co., a subsidiary of Sunbelt Communications Company; local news was contributed by Sunbelt's Las Vegas television station, KVBC (channel 3). KVBC reporters were heard on the radio station, as was the TV station's 5 p.m. local newscast. The reformatted station provided FM competition to KNUU (970 AM). Compass then entered into an agreement to purchase KRBO-FM outright. After Compass purchased the station, its ties to KVBC deepened. The station adopted the moniker "All News 3 FM" and the station changed its call sign to KVBC-FM on October 25, 1996. KVBC-FM continued as a news/talk station with local and national talk shows, with notable syndicated offerings including Imus in the Morning and Art Bell. During the Clinton–Lewinsky scandal, KVBC-FM offered Monica Lewinsky $5 million if she would do a tell-all interview with the station.

While a restructuring of Compass's ownership involving Meridian Communications in 1999 was said by Proctor to give the company the potential to expand, the sale of the station to EXCL Communications of San Jose, California, later that year sounded the death knell for the talk station. EXCL exclusively ran Spanish-language radio stations, and consequently, the entire air staff of KVBC-FM was dismissed in early December when the station was switched to a satellite-fed music format from EXCL's headquarters. KRNV-FM in Reno, which like KVBC-FM was a news/talk station utilizing resources from Sunbelt's local TV station, was also part of the deal and was switched to Spanish-language programming from EXCL at the same time. The actual sale of KVBC-FM for $3.25 million took place the next year. EXCL was in turn already in the process of merging with Entravision Communications.

In 2002, Entravision entered into an agreement to acquire KRCY (92.7 FM), a station rimshotting the Las Vegas market from Kingman, Arizona. It then changed that station's call sign to KQRT before announcing that it would move KRRN and its Spanish-language contemporary hit radio format to 92.7 MHz, with 105.1 MHz becoming KQRT and Radio Tricolor.

== Programming ==
KQRT was one of 14 Entravision-owned launch stations for the return of El Show de Piolín, hosted by Eddie "Piolín" Sotelo, in January 2015. It also airs El Show del Ratón, which Entravision syndicates from KDLD/KDLE in Los Angeles to 11 of its La Tricolor stations.
