= Entravision Communications =

American media company

Entravision Communications Corp.
- Type: Public
- Traded as: NYSE: EVC; Russell 2000 component
- Industry: Media; Entertainment
- Founded: July 10, 1996; 30 years ago
- Founder: Walter Ulloa
- Headquarters: Santa Monica, California, United States
- Key people: Michael Christenson (CEO); Jeffrey A. Liberman (President and COO)
- Revenue: ▲US$448 million (2025)
- Net income: ▲ −US$79.2 million (2025)
- Owners: William F. McCarter (71%); Walter Ulloa estate (12%); TelevisaUnivision (10%); Philip Wilkinson (5%); Paul Zevnik (4%)
- Website: entravision.com

Entravision Communications Corporation is an American media company based in Santa Monica, California. Entravision primarily caters to the Spanish-speaking Hispanic and Latino community and owns television and radio stations and outdoor media, in several of the top Hispanic and Latino markets. It is the largest affiliate group of the Univision and UniMás television networks. Entravision also owns a small number of English-language television and radio stations.

== History ==
On August 4, 2006, Entravision sold five of its radio stations in the Dallas–Fort Worth area to Liberman Broadcasting. On May 16, 2008, the company sold its outdoor media division, whose operations were primarily based in New York and Los Angeles, to Lamar Advertising Company.

In 2007, Entravision Communications Corporation acquired Spanish-language radio station WNUE-FM serving the Orlando, Florida, market from Mega Communications for an aggregate purchase price of approximately $24 million.

On 2018, Entravision acquired Barcelona based DSP Smadex.

In October 2020, the company announced the acquisition of a majority stake in Latin American digital media company Cisneros Interactive from Grupo Cisneros.

== Business ==
The company owns multiple radio and television stations, and a sales and marketing business.

=== Radio ===
- BRANDS on Radio and El Boton App

La Tricolor: Regional Mexican (10 Stations Owned) (1 Station By Beasley Broadcast Group)
La Suavecita: Regional Mexican and Spanish Adult Hits (11 Stations)
Fuego: Spanish Urban / Reggaeton (7 Stations)
TUDN Radio: Spanish Sports (5 Stations)
José: Regional Mexican, Spanish Adult Hits and Ranchera (2 Stations)
Reyna: Spanish Adult Contemporary (1 Station)
The Fox: Classic Hits (1 Station)
RGV: 80s & 90s Hits (1 Station)
Q: Classic Rock (1 Station)

- ONLINE ONLY on Elboton.com or El Boton App

Super Estrella: Spanish rock and Spanish AC
Radio Romántica: Spanish romantic ballads, Spanish Adult Hits and Ranchera
Tocada Alternativa: Spanish alternative rock
La Plebona: Corridos Tumbados and Regional Mexican

Market	Callsign	Frequency	Branding
Aspen, Colorado	KPVW	107.1FM / 104.3FM	La Tricolor
Denver, Colorado	KJMN	92.1FM	La Suavecita
Denver, Colorado	KXPK	96.5FM	La Tricolor
Denver, Colorado	KMXA	1090AM	TUDN Denver
El Centro, California	KSEH	94.5FM	La Suavecita
El Centro, California	KMXX	99.3FM	La Tricolor
El Paso, Texas	KOFX	92.3FM	The Fox
El Paso, Texas	KINT-FM	93.9FM	La Suavecita
El Paso, Texas	KYSE	94.7FM	Fuego
El Paso, Texas	KHRO	1150AM	La Suavecita
El Paso, Texas	KSVE	1650AM	TUDN El Paso
Las Vegas, Nevada	KRRN	92.7FM	Fuego
Las Vegas, Nevada	KQRT	105.1FM	La Tricolor
Los Angeles, California	KLYY	97.5FM	José
Los Angeles, California	KDLD	103.1FM	Reyna
Los Angeles, California	KDLE	103.1FM	Reyna
Los Angeles, California	KSSC	107.1FM	José
Los Angeles, California	KSSD	107.1FM	José
Los Angeles, California	KSSE	107.1FM	José
Lubbock, Texas	KAIQ	95.5FM	La Tricolor
Lubbock, Texas	KBZO	1460AM	TUDN Lubbock
McAllen/Rio Grande Valley	KFRQ	94.5FM	Q (All Rock)
McAllen/Rio Grande Valley	KKPS	99.5FM	Fuego
McAllen/Rio Grande Valley	KNVO-FM	101.1FM	La Suavecita
McAllen/Rio Grande Valley	KVLY	107.9FM	RGV-FM
Miami, Florida	WLQY	1320AM	WLQY AM
Modesto, California	KTSE-FM	97.1FM	La Suavecita
Modesto, California	KCVR-FM	98.9FM	Fuego
Monterey/Salinas, California	KLOK-FM / K260AA	99.5FM / 99.9FM	La Tricolor
Monterey/Salinas, California	KSES-FM	107.1FM	La Suavecita
Monterey/Salinas, California	KMBX	700AM	ESNE Radio
Palm Springs, California	KLOB	94.7FM	La Suavecita
Palm Springs, California	KPST-FM	103.5FM	Fuego
Phoenix, Arizona	KLNZ	103.5FM	La Tricolor
Phoenix, Arizona	KFUE	106.7FM	Fuego
Phoenix, Arizona	KVVA-FM	107.1FM	La Suavecita
Phoenix, Arizona	KBMB	710AM	TUDN Phoenix
Reno, Nevada	KRNV-FM	102.1FM	La Tricolor
Sacramento, California	KRCX-FM	99.9FM	La Tricolor
Sacramento, California	KHHM	101.9FM	Fuego
Sacramento, California	KNTY	103.5FM	Real Country
Sacramento, California	KXSE	104.3FM	La Suavecita
Santa Fe, New Mexico	KRZY-FM	105.9FM	La Suavecita
Santa Fe, New Mexico	KRZY	1450AM	TUDN Albuquerque
Stockton, California	KMIX	100.9FM	La Tricolor

=== Television ===
Market	Callsign	Channel	Network	Notes
Albuquerque, New Mexico	KTFQ-TV	41	UniMás	
Albuquerque, New Mexico	KLUZ-TV	14	Univision	Station owned by Univision and operated by Entravision under a local marketing agreement.
Boston, Massachusetts	WUNI	66	Univision	Station owned by Univision and operated by Entravision under a local marketing agreement.
Boston, Massachusetts	WUTF-TV	27	UniMás	
Colorado Springs, Colorado	KVSN-DT	48	Univision	
Colorado Springs, Colorado	KGHB-CD	27	UniMás	
Corpus Christi, Texas	KORO	28	Univision	
Corpus Christi, Texas	KCRP-CD	41	UniMás	
Denver, Colorado	KTFD-TV	50	UniMás	
Denver, Colorado	KCEC	14	Univision	Station owned by Univision and operated by Entravision under a local marketing agreement.
El Centro, California	KVYE	7	Univision	
El Centro, California	KAJB	54	UniMás	Station owned by Calipatria Broadcasting Company and operated by Entravision under a Joint sales agreement.
El Paso, Texas	KINT-TV	26	Univision	
El Paso, Texas	KTFN	65	UniMás	
Hagerstown, Maryland	WJAL	68	LATV	
Hartford, Connecticut	WUVN	18	Univision	
Hartford, Connecticut	WHTX-LD	43	Univision	
Hartford, Connecticut	WUTH-CD	47	UniMás	
Laredo, Texas	KLDO-TV	27	Univision	
Laredo, Texas	KXOF-CD	31	Fox	
Laredo, Texas	KETF-CD	39	UniMás	
Las Vegas, Nevada	KINC	15	Univision	
Las Vegas, Nevada	KELV-LD	27	UniMás	
Las Vegas, Nevada	KNTL-LD	15	Univision	
Lubbock, Texas	KBZO-LD	51	Univision	
McAllen, Texas	KXFX-CD	67	Fox	Repeats KMBH-LD.
McAllen, Texas	KCWT-CD	21	The CW Plus; PBS (DT4)	
McAllen, Texas	KTFV-CD	32	UniMás	
McAllen, Texas	KNVO	48	Univision	
McAllen, Texas	KMBH-LD	67	Fox; The CW (DT2)	
McAllen, Texas	KFXV	60	Fox	Repeats KMBH-LD.
Midland, Texas	KUPB	18	Univision	
Salinas/Monterey, California	KDJT-CD	33	UniMás	
Salinas/Monterey, California	KSMS-TV	67	Univision	
Orlando, Florida	WOTF-TV	26	WAPA Orlando	Station operated by WAPA Media under a time brokerage agreement and owned by Entravision.
Palm Springs, California	KVER-CD	41	Univision	
Palm Springs, California	KVES-LD	28	Univision	
Palm Springs, California	KEVC-CD	5	UniMás	
Palm Springs, California	KMIR-TV	36	NBC	
Palm Springs, California	KPSE-LD	50	MyNetworkTV	
Reno, Nevada	KREN-TV	27	Univision	
Reno, Nevada	KRNS-CD	46	UniMás	
San Angelo, Texas	KANG-LD	31	UniMás	
San Angelo, Texas	KEUS-LD	41	Univision	
San Diego, California	KBNT-CD	17	Univision	
San Diego, California	KHAX-LD	17	Univision	
San Diego, California	K03JB-D	17	Univision	
San Diego, California	KDTF-LD	36	UniMás	
Santa Barbara, California	K10OG-D	10	UniMás	
Santa Barbara, California	K17GD-D	17	Univision	
Santa Barbara, California	K32LT-D	28	Univision	
Santa Barbara, California	KTSB-CD	35	UniMás	
Santa Barbara, California	KPMR	38	Univision	
Tampa, Florida	WFTT-TV	62	Religious	
Washington, D.C.	WMDO-CD	47	LATV	
Derby-Wichita-Hutchinson, Kansas	KDCU-DT	46	Univision	

=== Other holdings ===
- Entravision Solutions (50 percent) – National spot radio advertising representative specializing in Spanish-language stations; co-owned with Lotus Communications.

=== Formerly owned media properties ===
- New York City – El Diario La Prensa (now owned by ImpreMedia)
- Dallas/Fort Worth, Texas – KTCY 101.7 FM (sold to Liberman Broadcasting)
- Dallas/Fort Worth, Texas – KRVA La Buena 1600 (sold to Mortenson Broadcasting)
- Dallas/Fort Worth, Texas – KZMP Radio Saalam Namaste FM 104.9/AM 1540 (sold to Liberman Broadcasting)
- Dallas/Fort Worth, Texas – KZZA Casa 106.7 FM (sold to Liberman Broadcasting)
- San Jose, California – KBRG 100.3 FM "Radio Romántica" (sold to Univision Radio Network)
- San Jose, California – KLOK 1170 AM (sold to Univision Radio Network)
- Salinas, California - KCBA (sold to News-Press & Gazette Company)
- New York, New York – Vista Media Group, an outdoor advertising division (sold to Lamar Advertising Company)
- Reno, Nevada – KNVV-LP (license cancelled by FCC May 23, 2014)
- Tampa, Florida – WVEA-LP (license cancelled by FCC April 22, 2015)
- Denver, Colorado – KDVT-LP (license cancelled by FCC September 13, 2017)
- Albuquerque, New Mexico – KTFA-LP (license cancelled by FCC January 17, 2018)
- Las Vegas, Nevada – KMCC (sold to Ion Media Networks on April 3, 2020)
- Mesquite, etc., Nevada - KWWB-LP (license cancelled by FCC July 10, 2021)
- San Diego, California – KTCD-LP (license cancelled by FCC on August 9, 2021)
- Orlando, Florida - WNUE-FM (sold to Radio Training Network on July 20, 2021)
- Houston, Texas - KGOL (sold to FM Media Ventures on August 30, 2021)
- McAllen, Texas - XHRIO-TDT (license cancelled by IFT December 31, 2021)
- El Centro, California - KWST (sold to El Sembrador Ministries on May 26, 2022)
