= KINC =

Television station in Las Vegas

- Las Vegas, Nevada; United States
- Channels: Digital: 16 (UHF); Virtual: 15
- Branding: Univision Las Vegas (general); Noticias Las Vegas (newscasts)

Programming
- Affiliations: 15.1: Univision; for others, see § Technical information and subchannels

Ownership
- Owner: Entravision Communications; (Entravision Holdings, LLC)
- Sister stations: KELV-LD; KRRN; KQRT

History
- Founded: May 22, 1992
- First air date: January 16, 1996
- Former call signs: KZIR (1993–1995)
- Former channel numbers: Analog: 15 (UHF, 1996–2009); Translator: KWWB-LP 45 Mesquite
- Call sign meaning: Calls are phonetically sounded out as quince, fifteen in Spanish

Technical information
- Licensing authority: FCC
- Facility ID: 67089
- ERP: 1,000 kW
- HAAT: 570.5 m (1,872 ft)
- Transmitter coordinates: 35°56′46″N 115°2′37″W
- Translator(s): KNTL-LD 35 Laughlin

Links
- Public license information: Public file; LMS
- Website: noticiaslasvegas.com

KINC (channel 15) is a television station in Las Vegas, Nevada, United States, affiliated with the Spanish-language network Univision. It is owned by Entravision Communications alongside low-power UniMás affiliate KELV-LD (channel 27). The two stations share studios on Pilot Road in the unincorporated community of Paradise (with a Las Vegas mailing address); KINC's transmitter is located on Mount Arden near Henderson.

== History ==
KINC's previous logo, used from January 1996 through December 31, 2012. The logo shown is from the year 2000.

The Federal Communications Commission (FCC) granted an original construction permit on May 22, 1992, to Tierra Alta Broadcasting, Inc., to build the Las Vegas area's newest full-service television station. Originally, the station was approved for 5,000 kW to broadcast on UHF channel 15 and acquired the call sign KZIR in November 1993. In 1995, Tierra Alta Broadcasting made several changes to its construction permit: moving its transmitter to the KFBT (now KVCW) tower, reducing its power to 1,145 kW, and changing its call sign to KINC. The station made its debut in January 1996 and was licensed the following November. The station's analog facilities would not change again until the analog shutdown in June 2009.

Tierra Alta Broadcasting announced the sale of the station to Entravision Holdings, LLC in December 1996. The FCC approved the license transfer in April 1997 and Entravision took over the station a month later.

== Programming ==
The majority of the programming aired on this station comes from the national Univision network. However, KINC does have a news department which produces the highest rated Spanish newscasts in the Las Vegas Valley. In 2006, KINC has aired both the Nevada Republican and Democratic gubernatorial primary debates translated into the Spanish language.

=== Newscasts ===
KINC currently produces two live newscasts each weekday at 6 and 11 p.m., covering the state of Nevada. The station's news department also creates 30-second newsbriefs which air both on KINC and KELV-LD as well as news-related station identifications that air solely on KINC at the top of each hour from 3 to 5 p.m. and 8 to 10 p.m.

== Technical information and subchannels ==
KINC's transmitter is located on Mount Arden near Henderson. The station's signal is multiplexed:

Subchannels of KINC
Subchannel	Res.	Short name	Programming
15.1	1080i	Univisn	Univision
15.2	480i	LATV	LATV
15.4	480i	TruCrme	True Crime Network
15.5	480i	Quest	Quest
15.6	Audio only	FM	Fuego 92.7

=== Analog-to-digital conversion ===
When the FCC released its initial DTV allocations on April 21, 1997, it assigned UHF channel 16 to KINC-DT as its digital companion channel. Although many allocations were adjusted when the FCC issued its revised final DTV allocations table on February 17, 1998, KINC's remained unchanged. It was the only UHF station in Las Vegas to retain its original allocation. KINC was granted a permit to construct its digital facilities on November 24, 2000. Supplier difficulties delayed construction of the full-power facilities, requiring extensions of the construction permit, and on February 24, 2003, KINC was granted Special Temporary Authority (STA) to construct a low-power facility in order to comply with the FCC deadline for commencing digital broadcasting while the full-power facilities were still being built. The station completed construction of its full-power digital facilities in June 2006, and was granted a license on March 8, 2007.

In 2006, the FCC required each station with a digital companion channel to select which station it would continue to use after the end of the transition period. KINC-DT elected channel 16 as its final digital channel and at analog shutdown on June 12, 2009, returned the channel 15 license to the FCC. Televisions still tune to KINC on channel 15 per the ATSC virtual channel standards.

KINC began broadcasting in high definition in June 2010, in time for the 2010 FIFA World Cup. Programming offered in HD by the Univision network is broadcast. Local newscasts are also produced in HD.

=== Translator ===
- KNTL-LD 35 Laughlin

==== Former translator ====
KINC was previously relayed on analog translator KWWB-LP in Mesquite; this station's license was surrendered to the FCC on July 7, 2021, and canceled three days later.

== Photos ==
KINC-DT and KELV-LP Dual Master Control Room.

KINC-DT and KELV-LP Digital Television Equipment.

KINC-DT Master Control Switcher.

== See also ==
- List of Univision affiliates
