= James E. Rogers (attorney) =

American entrepreneur and former attorney

- Born: September 15, 1938; Louisville, Kentucky, U.S.
- Died: June 14, 2014 (aged 75); Las Vegas, Nevada, U.S.
- Resting place: Palm Memorial Park, Las Vegas
- Education: Carroll College (Montana); Idaho State University; Kentucky Wesleyan College; University of Arizona; University of Nevada, Las Vegas; University of Southern California
- Occupations: Entrepreneur and former attorney
- Spouse: Beverly Barlow (3rd wife)
- Children: 3

James E. Rogers (September 15, 1938 – June 14, 2014) was an American entrepreneur and former attorney. He served as interim chancellor of the Nevada System of Higher Education and the University of Arizona College of Law carries his name.

== Early life ==
Rogers was a 1956 graduate of Las Vegas High School. He had degrees in accounting (B.S.) and law (LL.B.) from the University of Arizona and a Master of Laws (LL.M.) from the University of Southern California. He was a teaching fellow in the law school of the University of Illinois in 1963 and 1964. In 1998 he was awarded a Doctor of Laws (LL.D.) from the University of Arizona. Rogers holds honorary doctorates from University of Arizona, Idaho State University, Kentucky Wesleyan College, Carroll College and University of Nevada, Las Vegas. He was also a member of the State Bar Associations of Nevada, Arizona and California.

== Career ==
From 1971 onward, a group of local residents led by Rogers made an effort to take control of Las Vegas's NBC affiliate, KORK-TV. The group gained further momentum in the late 1970s after KORK-TV's owner, Donrey Media Group, began heavily preempting NBC programming in order to sell more local advertising, though NBC was far less tolerant of this than the other networks at the time. The most notable of these preemptions was the 1978 World Series, angering both NBC and several Las Vegas area viewers, some of whom complained to the Federal Communications Commission. Facing pressure from both NBC and the FCC, Donrey was forced to sell the station to the Rogers group's holding company, Valley Broadcasting Company, in 1979. Donrey retained KORK radio, and as a result on October 1, 1979, the station became KVBC, reflecting the new ownership. Since then, the station has more or less cleared the whole NBC lineup.

Rogers owned 98% of the stock of Sunbelt Communications Company (now Intermountain West Communications Company), which owned and operated the NBC affiliate television stations in Las Vegas, Reno and Elko, Nevada; Yuma, Arizona-El Centro, California; Helena, Montana; Pocatello-Idaho Falls, Idaho; Casper, Wyoming; and the Fox affiliate in Twin Falls, Idaho.

Rogers was in active law practice in Las Vegas from 1964 through 1988, at which time he ceased practicing to devote 100% of his time to the development of the television and radio stations of Sunbelt.

Rogers became a member of the Board of Directors of Nevada National Bank in 1981 (the third largest bank in Nevada), served as a member of the bank's Loan Committee for ten years, and was chairman of the board from 1985 to 1987. He was involved in the purchase of Nevada National Bank by Security Pacific Bank of California in 1989, and served on the board of directors of Security Pacific Bank, Nevada until it was purchased by Bank of America. He was a founder and served on the board of directors of Community Bank of Nevada, and was chairman of its Loan Committee until he left that bank to form Nevada First Bank in 1998. He is a founder and presently serves as the chairman of the board of Nevada First Bank.

Rogers was appointed by the Board of Regents to serve as the Interim Chancellor of the Nevada System of Higher Education on May 7, 2004.

=== Philanthropic activity ===
An active supporter of education, he and his wife Beverly made substantial financial contributions to various colleges and universities. Their gift to the University of Arizona College of Law totaled $115 million. In November 1998, the Arizona Board of Regents renamed the University of Arizona college of Law James E. Rogers College of Law.

Active in all the communities in which Sunbelt has television stations, Rogers served as a member of the Dean's Advisory Council of the University of Nevada, Engineering College in Reno, Nevada (to which he gave or pledged $750,000); was a member of the Dean's Council of the UNLV College of Law in Las Vegas (to which he gave or pledged $28,500,000); and was a member and President-Elect of the Idaho State University Foundation in Pocatello, Idaho (to which he gave or pledged $20 million). Sunbelt constructed a building on the campus of Great Basin Community College in Elko, Nevada at a cost to Sunbelt of approximately $1.25 million. This building formerly housed the studios for KENV-DT, along with classrooms for teaching communications.

== Personal life ==
Rogers was married to Beverly Barlow and had three children from a previous marriage: Suzanne Rogers Plant, Kimberly Rogers Cell, and Perry Rogers, along with eight grandchildren.

== Illness and death ==
In January 2014, Rogers was diagnosed with bladder cancer for the second time. At the time of his diagnosis, Rogers had begun to sell some of his television stations in Idaho and Wyoming, but still owned stations in Arizona, Montana, and Nevada; his wife Beverly would temporarily take over day-to-day operations of the television stations. Rogers died on June 14, 2014, at the age of 75.

Following Rogers' death, Sinclair Broadcast Group announced in September 2014 that it would acquire KSNV, which was the last station Rogers owned, for $120 million; a significant portion of the proceeds from the station's sale were set aside side for educational outreach purposes.
