= Intermountain West Communications Company =

American television broadcast company

- Type: Private
- Industry: Telecommunications; Mass media
- Predecessor: Sunbelt Communications Company
- Founded: October 1, 1979
- Defunct: January 9, 2018; (38 years, 100 days)
- Fate: Dissolved
- Headquarters: Las Vegas, Nevada, U.S.
- Products: Broadcast television
- Owner: James E. "Jim" Rogers

Intermountain West Communications Company (formerly Sunbelt Communications Company) was an American telecommunications company, formerly owned by James E. Rogers (1938–2014), that remains as the licensee company for a number of local television stations in the United States, operated by Sinclair Broadcast Group and subsidiary companies Howard Stirk Holdings and Cunningham Broadcasting.

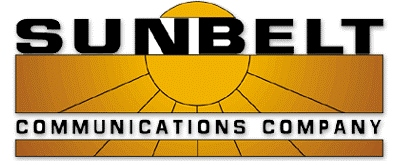
Logo for Sunbelt Communications Company

Headquartered in Las Vegas, Nevada, it was founded on October 1, 1979 as Sunbelt Communications Company, following the purchase of KORK-TV, the NBC affiliate in Las Vegas, by local attorney James E. Rogers and 16 Las Vegas residents. KORK-TV was renamed KVBC after taking control and KSNV-DT (now KSNV) on July 9, 2010, and Rogers expanded Sunbelt's reach to include other stations in Arizona, Idaho, Montana, Nevada, New Mexico and Wyoming. In 2008, Sunbelt was renamed Intermountain West Communications Company; Rogers was at his summer home in Montana when he was asked about the "SUNBELT" license plate on his car when Montana wasn't a Sun Belt state. Most of IWCC's stations, prior to the gradual sale of them that began in 2013, were NBC affiliates.

On September 3, 2014, Intermountain West Communications announced that it would sell KSNV-DT to Sinclair Broadcast Group for $120 million. As Sinclair already owned a duopoly in Las Vegas, KVMY (channel 21) and KVCW (channel 33), the company planned to sell the license assets (though not the programming) of one of the three stations to comply with FCC ownership restrictions, with the divested station's programming being moved to the other stations. 80–85% of proceeds from the sale will go toward the formation of the Rogers Educational Foundation, which supported students and educators in Southern Nevada.

On November 1, 2014, KSNV began the process of swapping signals with KVMY; KVMY moved its MyNetworkTV programming to a subchannel of KVCW, which was replaced by a simulcast of KSNV-DT's programming. Additionally, the two stations swapped virtual channel numbers, which moved KVMY to channel 3, and KSNV to channel 21. On November 4, 2014, the call letters on KVMY's license were changed to KSNV, and the existing KSNV license changed its call letters to KVMY. These moves effectively put KSNV under Sinclair ownership using its existing channel 21 license. The previous channel 3 license was later sold to Howard Stirk Holdings. A similar swap occurred during Sinclair's acquisition of WCIV, in which its ABC programming and call sign were moved to another Sinclair-owned signal, and the previous WCIV channel 4 license (renamed WMMP) was sold to Howard Stirk Holdings, though the PSIP channel number was not swapped. When the sale closes, Sinclair would control half of those stations. It also created a situation in which a CW affiliate is the nominal senior partner in a duopoly involving an NBC affiliate and a "Big Four" station.

The company would remain as a technical going concern operating two stations until January 9, 2018, as the sales of KRNV-DT and KENV-DT were held up in the FCC due to unknown factors; both stations would eventually be sold instead to Cunningham Broadcasting, a company related to Sinclair that holds the licenses, with Sinclair operating the stations through joint operations and shared services agreements. The sale was approved on September 22, 2017, and completed on January 9, 2018.

== Final stations ==
- Stations are arranged in alphabetical order by state and city of license.

Stations owned by Intermountain West Communications Company
Media market	State	Station	Purchased	Sold	Notes
Yuma	Arizona	KYMA	1989	2014	
Pocatello	Idaho	KPVI	1995	2014	
Pocatello	Idaho	KFXP	1998	2013	(Note: Owned by a third party and operated by IWCC.)
Twin Falls	Idaho	KXTF	1995	2014	(Note: Known as KKVI prior to 1997.)
Great Falls	Montana	KBGF-LP	2005	2014	(Note: Satellite of KTVH.)
Havre	Montana	KBBJ	2001	2009	
Helena	Montana	KMTF	1998	2014	
Helena	Montana	KTVH	1997	2014	
Lewistown	Montana	KBAO	2001	2009	
Elko	Nevada	KENV	1997	2018	(Note: Semi-satellite of KRNV.)
Ely	Nevada	KVNV	2004	2008	(Note: Satellite of KVBC.) (Note: Known as KBJN prior to 2005.)
Las Vegas	Nevada	KSNV	1979	2014	(Note: Known as KVBC prior to 2010.)
Las Vegas	Nevada	KVBC-FM	1996	2000	
Reno	Nevada	KRNV	1989	2018	
Reno	Nevada	KRNV-FM	1995	2000	
Winnemucca	Nevada	KWNV	1998	2010	(Note: Satellite of KRNV.)
Santa Fe–Albuquerque	New Mexico	KKTO-TV	1988	1992	(Note: Known as KNMZ-TV prior to 1989.)
Casper	Wyoming	KCWY	1998	2013	
Jackson	Wyoming	KJWY	1995	2009	(Note: Satellite of KPVI.) (Note: Known as KJVI prior to 1996.)
Sheridan	Wyoming	KSWY	2002	2009	(Note: Satellite of KCWY.) (Note: Known as KBNM prior to 2002.)
