= KPVW =

Coordinates: 39.316°N 106.959°W

- Aspen, Colorado; United States
- Broadcast area: Aspen, Colorado
- Frequency: 107.1 MHz
- Branding: La Tricolor 107.1FM y 104.3FM

Programming
- Format: Regional Mexican

Ownership
- Owner: Entravision Communications; (Entravision Holdings, LLC)

Technical information
- Licensing authority: FCC
- Facility ID: 3008
- Class: C3
- ERP: 20,500 Watts
- HAAT: 110 meters (360 ft)
- Translator: 99.9 K260BZ (Aspen)

Links
- Public license information: Public file; LMS
- Website: www.radiolatricolor.com/aspen

KPVW (107.1 FM) is a radio station broadcasting a regional Mexican format. It is licensed to Aspen, Colorado, United States, and serves the Aspen area. The station is owned by Entravision Holdings.
