= KUPB =

Television station in Midland, Texas

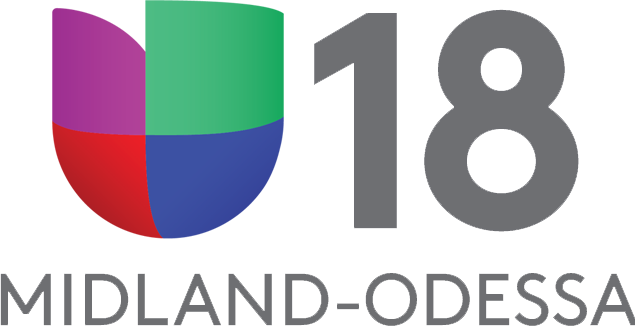
- Midland–Odessa, Texas; United States
- Channels: Digital: 18 (UHF); Virtual: 18
- Branding: Univision 18

Programming
- Affiliations: 18.1: Univision; for others, see § Subchannels

Ownership
- Owner: Entravision Communications; (Entravision Holdings, LLC)

History
- First air date: May 14, 2001
- Former channel numbers: Analog: 18 (UHF, 2001–2009)
- Call sign meaning: Univision Permian Basin

Technical information
- Licensing authority: FCC
- Facility ID: 86263
- ERP: 1,000 kW
- HAAT: 281 m (922 ft)
- Transmitter coordinates: 31°50′19.4″N 102°32′0.6″W

Links
- Public license information: Public file; LMS
- Website: noticiasmidland.com

KUPB (channel 18) is a television station in Midland, Texas, United States, serving the Permian Basin area as an affiliate of the Spanish-language network Univision. The station is owned by Entravision Communications, and has studios on Younger Road in Midland; its transmitter is located on University Boulevard in West Odessa.

== History ==
The station commenced broadcasting on analog channel 18 on May 14, 2001. KUPB moved to digital broadcasting on June 12, 2009, at 9 a.m., "flash-cutting" to digital channel 18 after a temporary (3 minutes) signal outage. (Note: KUPB was granted a construction permit after the Federal Communications Commission finalized the digital television allotment plan on April 21, 1997; as a result, the station did not receive a companion channel for a digital television station.) KUPB moved to high definition (1080i) at 10 a.m. on May 3, 2010.

In 2013, KUPB added a secondary station, KUPB-DT2, and began airing ZUUS Latino on 18.2. In 2014, it removed ZUUS Latino and replaced it with LATV.

In 2018, KUPB added two additional subchannels that broadcast English programming.

== News operation ==
KUPB's logo prior to January 1, 2013

Noticias 18 was launched on November 5, 2007, to provide news for the viewers in the Permian Basin. KUPB had been airing two-minute newsbriefs since August 2003. On October 13, 2008, the name of the newscast was changed to Noticias Univision Oeste de Texas and began to be simulcast on San Angelo sister station KEUS-LP. In 2015, Entravision transferred production of KUPB's newscasts to El Paso sister station KINT-TV.

== Subchannels ==
The station's signal is multiplexed:

Subchannels of KUPB
| Channel | Res. | Short name | Programming |
|---|---|---|---|
| 18.1 | 1080i | Univsn | Univision |
| 18.2 | 480i | LATV | LATV |
| 18.5 | 480i | CourtTV | Court TV |
| 18.88 | 1080i | AltaVsn | AltaVision |

Subchannel broadcast with MPEG-4 video
