= KRXI-TV =

Television station in Reno, Nevada

Currently silent

- Reno, Nevada; United States
- Channels: Digital: 23 (UHF); Virtual: 11
- Branding: 11.1: Fox 11; 11.2: News 4

Programming
- Affiliations: 11.1: Fox; 11.2: NBC; 11.3: Charge!

Ownership
- Owner: Sinclair Broadcast Group; (KRXI Licensee, LLC)
- Sister stations: KNSN-TV, KRNV-DT

History
- Founded: August 21, 1992
- First air date: December 3, 1995
- Former call signs: KCHZ (August–September 1992); KRXI (September 1992–2002)
- Former channel numbers: Analog: 11 (VHF, 1996–2009); Digital: 44 (UHF, until 2018)
- Call sign meaning: Reno and XI (Roman numeral 11)

Technical information
- Licensing authority: FCC
- Facility ID: 48360
- ERP: 400 kW
- HAAT: 854 m (2,802 ft)
- Transmitter coordinates: 39°35′23″N 119°55′41″W
- Translator(s): see § Translators

Links
- Public license information: Public file; LMS
- Website: 11.1: foxreno.com; 11.2: mynews4.com

KRXI-TV (channel 11) is a television station in Reno, Nevada, United States, affiliated with Fox and NBC. It is owned by Sinclair Broadcast Group alongside sports-formatted independent station KNSN-TV (channel 21) and operated with KRNV-DT (channel 4). The three stations share studios on Vassar Street in Reno; KRXI-TV is broadcast from transmitters on Peavine Peak and Slide Mountain.

KRXI-TV began broadcasting on December 3, 1995. It replaced channel 21, then KAME-TV, as Reno's Fox affiliate. Luther Mack, a restaurant owner, won the channel 11 permit and contracted with Cox Broadcasting for management, with Cox buying the station outright; Cox also programmed KAME. Even though the creation of a local news department was announced, the station primarily rebroadcast the 10 p.m. newscast of Cox-owned KTVU in Oakland, California. Sinclair acquired KRXI-TV and three other Cox stations in small markets in 2013; later that year, it purchased the physical assets of KRNV-DT, then Reno's NBC affiliate. On December 1, 2025, NBC programming moved from KRNV to a subchannel of KRXI.

== History ==
=== Early years and Cox ownership ===
The Federal Communications Commission (FCC) added channel 11 at Reno—the fifth VHF allotment in the city—to the Television Table of Assignments on October 15, 1984, rejecting a counterproposal by the owners of KTVN and KOLO-TV to instead add channel 11 to Redding, California; KHSL-TV in Chico opposed the counterproposal on grounds of potential interference with its channel 12 facility and with community-owned translators and cable services.

By November 1985, the FCC had received 16 applications to build a TV station on channel 11 at Reno. In 1987, FCC administrative law judge Joseph Chachkin favored the Nevada Television Corporation, a group of businessmen headed by McDonald's franchise owner Luther Mack, over five remaining contenders for the permit. He favored the group's ownership structure and proposed coverage. The decision was reaffirmed by the commission in 1990 and by a federal appeals court in 1991.

Channel 11 was announced to come to air first at some point in 1992 and then in October 1993. Nevada Television Corporation was attempting to decide whether to secure a network affiliation or operate as an independent station. At the time, Fox had just renewed its affiliation agreement with KAME-TV (channel 21) for a two-year term. By November 1994, KRXI-TV was pending construction of an interim transmitter facility on Slide Mountain while it attempted to work through the engineering challenges of building a permanent transmitter on Peavine Peak.

In February 1995, Kevin O'Brien, the general manager of KTVU in Oakland, California, told Broadcasting & Cable that he was negotiating with Nevada Television Corporation to provide programming and technical services to KRXI-TV as a step to eventually purchasing it. At the time, Nevada Television was also negotiating with another potential buyer. That October, the station announced it would replace KAME-TV as the Fox affiliate for Reno, owing to its stronger VHF signal. Cox had agreed to manage KRXI and KAME. The addition of KAME to the agreement saved Nevada Television Company millions of dollars, as KAME had preexisting studios; Cox spent $10 million to buy the non-license assets of that station from Ellis Communications.

KRXI-TV began broadcasting on December 3, 1995. It temporarily broadcast from Red Peak, north of Reno, until the Peavine Peak facility could be completed. The station offered the 10 p.m. newscast from KTVU with plans to insert Reno-area news into the broadcast. Cox acquired the station outright in June 1997 and announced plans to launch a local 10 p.m. newscast by 1999. No such newscast materialized, and KRXI continued to offer KTVU news simulcasts including, beginning in 2001, KTVU's noon news. Later, this was supplemented with 11@11, an 11 p.m. newscast produced under contract by the Independent News Network of Davenport, Iowa.

=== Sinclair ownership ===
In 2012, Cox acquired a package of stations in Jacksonville, Florida, and Tulsa, Oklahoma, from Newport Television. It proceeded to put four smaller-market Cox television stations—KRXI-TV (and its agreement to manage KAME-TV); WTOV-TV in Steubenville, Ohio; WJAC-TV in Johnstown, Pennsylvania; and KFOX-TV in El Paso, Texas—plus several smaller-market radio stations up for sale. On February 25, 2013, Cox announced that it would sell the four television stations, and the LMA for KAME, to Sinclair Broadcast Group. The sale was finalized on May 2, 2013.

Sinclair subsequently purchased the non-license assets of a third Reno station, KRNV-DT (channel 4), on November 22, 2013. After making this acquisition, Sinclair declared that it expected to replace the KTVU news simulcast on KRXI with a newscast produced in Reno. Cox discontinued its agreement to air the morning and noon newscasts on May 14, 2014, with KRXI continuing to air KTVU's 10 p.m. newscast. This was phased out on August 1, 2023, when KRXI premiered its own half-hour 10 p.m. newscast titled Fox 11 News at 10.

An X account claiming to belong to KRXI-TV posted a photo in September 2025 that falsely identified a 77-year-old Canadian man as the culprit in the assassination of Charlie Kirk, which subsequently went viral online after other users took it as fact. The account was linked to a website that mimicked the station's actual website. A spokeswoman for Sinclair Broadcast Group denounced the fake account and said they were trying to shut it down.

On December 1, 2025, the NBC affiliation was moved from KRNV-DT to KRXI-TV's second subchannel, while KRNV's main channel flipped to Roar with reasons cited including the continued rollout of ATSC 3.0 in the Reno area.

On January 18, 2026, the KRXI-TV antenna experienced a transmission line failure. KRNV-DT is temporarily broadcasting KRXI-Fox and KRXI-NBC from its transmitter. Sinclair estimated it would take two months to put KRXI-TV back into service.

== Technical information and subchannels ==
KRXI-TV is broadcast from a main transmitter on Peavine Peak and a digital replacement translator on Slide Mountain. The station's signal is multiplexed:

Subchannels of KRXI-TV
Subchannel	Res.	Short name	Programming
11.1	720p	FOX11	Fox
11.2	1080i	NBC4	NBC
11.3	480i	Charge!	Charge!
21.1	720p	KNSN-TV	KNSN-TV (Independent)

Broadcast on behalf of another station

=== Analog-to-digital conversion ===
KRXI-TV shut down its analog signal, over VHF channel 11, on June 12, 2009, the official digital television transition date. under federal mandate. The station's digital signal remained on its pre-transition UHF channel 44, using virtual channel 11. The station relocated its signal from channel 44 to channel 23 in 2018 as a result of the 2016 United States wireless spectrum auction.

=== Translators ===
KRXI-TV's signal is additionally rebroadcast over the following translators:

- Battle Mountain: K13JD-D
- Beowawe: K24JL-D
- Carson City: K17CA-D
- Elko: K17DT-D
- Ely: K20LD-D
- Ely & McGill: K16NB-D
- Eureka: K16IZ-D, K29NK-D
- Golconda: K33GB-D
- Hawthorne: K22FH-D
- Litchfield, CA: K32MJ-D
- Lund & Preston: K21OK-D
- Manhattan: K06KQ-D
- Mina–Luning: K32NW-D
- Orovada: K32KQ-D
- Ruth: K17NU-D
- Ryndon: K18GT-D
- Schurz: K36FF-D
- South Lake Tahoe, CA: K14SD-D
- Susanville, CA: K29LT-D
- Valmy: K27OM-D, K34FP-D
- Walker Lake: K24EY-D
- Winnemucca: K23FR-D
- Yerington: K19MJ-D
