= KELV-LD =

Television station in Las Vegas

- Las Vegas, Nevada; United States
- Channels: Digital: 15 (UHF); Virtual: 27
- Branding: UniMás Las Vegas

Programming
- Affiliations: 27.1: UniMás

Ownership
- Owner: Entravision Communications; (Entravision Holdings, LLC)
- Sister stations: KINC; KRRN; KQRT

History
- Founded: November 28, 1980
- First air date: January 13, 1984
- Former call signs: K27AF (1980–2001)
- Former affiliations: SIN/Univision (sole affiliation, 1984–1996; via KINC, 1996–2002)
- Call sign meaning: Entravision Las Vegas

Technical information
- Licensing authority: FCC
- Facility ID: 187933
- Class: LD
- ERP: 15 kW
- HAAT: 546.8 m (1,794 ft)
- Transmitter coordinates: 35°56′46″N 115°2′37″W

Links
- Public license information: LMS

KELV-LD (channel 27) is a low-power television station in Las Vegas, Nevada, United States, affiliated with the Spanish-language network UniMás. The station is owned by Entravision Communications alongside Univision affiliate KINC (channel 15). The two stations share studios on Pilot Road in the unincorporated community of Paradise (with a Las Vegas mailing address); KELV-LD's transmitter is located atop Mount Arden near Henderson.

== Subchannels ==
Subchannels of KELV-LD
Subchannel	Res.	Short name	Programming
27.1	1080i	UniMas	UniMás
