= KRNV-FM =

Radio station in Reno, Nevada

- Reno, Nevada; United States
- Broadcast area: Reno–Sparks Metropolitan Statistical Area
- Frequency: 102.1 MHz (HD Radio)
- Branding: La Tricolor 102.1

Programming
- Format: Regional Mexican

Ownership
- Owner: Entravision Communications; (Entravision Holdings, LLC)
- Sister stations: Television: KREN-TV, KRNS-CD

History
- First air date: August 12, 1986
- Former call signs: KSXY (1986–1991); KTHX (1991–1994)
- Former frequencies: 101.7 MHz (1986–2003)
- Call sign meaning: Reno, Nevada; carried over from former sister television station KRNV

Technical information
- Licensing authority: FCC
- Facility ID: 50305
- Class: C3
- ERP: 11,000 watts
- HAAT: 150 meters (490 ft)
- Transmitter coordinates: 39°35′2.6″N 119°47′55.6″W

Links
- Public license information: Public file; LMS
- Website: elboton.com/reno/radio/la-tricolor-102-1/

KRNV-FM is a commercial radio station located in Reno, Nevada, United States, broadcasting on 102.1 FM. KRNV-FM airs a regional Mexican music format branded as "La Tricolor 102.1".

Launched in 1986 as KSXY, the station cycled through adult contemporary and contemporary hit radio formats before finding success with an adult album alternative format whose potential removal spurred listener outcry. It was sold to Sunbelt Communications Company in 1994 and became KRNV-FM, a news-oriented complement to its television station, KRNV. Sunbelt exited radio in 1999, and KRNV has had its present format ever since.

== History ==
=== KSXY and KTHX ===
On April 23, 1984, Reno Broadcasters, Inc., applied to build a new radio station in Reno on 101.7 MHz. This application was designated for comparative hearing by the Federal Communications Commission (FCC) opposite six other proposals for the same frequency.

In July 1986, Reno Broadcasters sold the unbuilt station, bearing the call letters KSXY, for $250,000 to Modern Broadcasting, which owned KOH (630 AM); Robert Ostlund, the principal of Reno Broadcasters, was the general manager of KOH. A month later, on August 10, KSXY started testing its transmitter by broadcasting wind noises, described by the Reno Gazette-Journal as "a continual windstorm", with programming beginning two days later. Known as "Sexy", the station's adult contemporary format consisted of love songs of the past 20 years and debuted with a marathon of 5,000 commercial-free songs, but it failed to gain ratings traction in the market. In November 1988, KSXY flipped to contemporary hit radio as "X102", seeking to fill a recently made format hole that had left Reno with just one station in the format, KWNZ (97.3 FM).

In 1990, 68-year-old Sidney Stern, who owned KOH and KSXY, reached a deal to sell the stations to Olympic Broadcasters, which owned stations to Reno's west in Sacramento and Quincy, California. Olympic charted a new course for the station, one that would echo through Reno radio for 31 years. Feeling that there was a chance to offer something Reno did not have, KSXY flipped to an adult album alternative as "The X" on November 1, 1990; the new, eclectic sound was patterned after KBCO in Boulder, Colorado. In support of the format, KSXY became KTHX; general manager De Hagen noted: "'Sexy' is not something I want to refer to in my radio station." (Note: The call sign change is not listed in FCC systems until February 4, 1991, though it was announced in December 1990.)

Cash problems at Olympic Broadcasters, however, meant that the owners could not wait much longer for the format to be profitable, despite having attracted listeners; it was being subsidized by KOH's profits. Having heard enough, Olympic pulled the plug on August 2, 1991, and switched KTHX to a simulcast of KOH. The move was met with a flurry of letters and phone calls in protest of the change, prompting Olympic to reconsider its decision and The X returned on August 19 with its air staff intact after a 17-day interregnum.

=== News/talk era ===
In February 1994, Olympic sold KOH's intellectual property to Citadel Broadcasting, leading to the move of KOH to KKOH (780 AM) and the launch of Christian-formatted KRCV at 630. It then found a buyer for KTHX: Sunbelt Communications Company, owners of KRNV television (channel 4). Sunbelt had a format in mind for its new acquisition: all-news radio using the existing local news resources of its TV station, putting "The X" back on the endangered list. The move came at the same time the station was slated to increase power from 5,000 to 25,000 watts. A new 15,000-square-foot (1,400 m^{2}) radio facility would be built out inside the KRNV television studios on Vassar Street and open in July. Sunbelt beat out an offer from the owner of KRZQ (96.5 FM), who proposed to retain "The X"'s format but could only pay in installments, whereas Sunbelt had presented an all-cash offer.

The changeover to a new format was originally slated for May 1, but delays in hiring a team to run the news station gave the outgoing KTHX a temporary reprieve until July 11, when the new KRNV-FM debuted, mixing local morning and daytime rolling news coverage with audio simulcasts of the television station's 5 p.m., 6 p.m., and 11 p.m. newscasts. (The X and its management and disc jockeys turned up a month later at 94.7 FM.) The format proved successful enough that a Sunbelt affiliate leased out and then bought a radio station in Las Vegas, which became KVBC-FM, in 1995.

For eight months in 1995, KRNV-FM dropped all normal daytime programming to cover the trial of O. J. Simpson. After the trial, KRNV-FM added more talk programming to its lineup, and in early 1999, the station began broadcasting jazz music during weekend and evening hours to boost middling ratings.

=== Spanish era ===
Sunbelt ended its five-year excursion into radio on December 1, 1999, by selling KRNV-FM and KVBC-FM to EXCL Communications of San Jose, California, marking the company's first entrance into Nevada radio. It also sounded the death knell for the news/talk formats, as EXCL specialized in Spanish-language radio. EXCL assumed operations of the two stations on December 1; while Sunbelt retained all but one of KRNV-FM's employees in its television operation, EXCL converted it to the first Spanish-language FM station in Northern Nevada. The sale of KRNV-FM for $14.25 million was filed later that month.

EXCL merged the next year with Entravision Communications. The station emerged as an immediate ratings contender. In the first year as Radio Tricolor, the overall audience rating for KRNV-FM was higher than it was in any year under Sunbelt. In the slightly younger 18–49 demographic, it reached second overall. In November 2001, Entravision acquired the Univision affiliation in Reno from Pappas Telecasting and expanded its studio center with KRNV-FM and the TV station the next year.

In 2003, KRNV-FM moved from 101.7 to 102.1 MHz. The change had been ordered by the FCC in 1997 to allow 101.5 MHz to be allocated to Truckee, California; Sunbelt had opposed the proceeding at that time because of the potential damage to its operation and concerns about the financial ability of the party backing the new Truckee station proposal to reimburse it for its expenses in making the change.

== Programming ==
KRNV-FM was one of 14 Entravision-owned launch stations for the return of El Show de Piolín, hosted by Eddie "Piolín" Sotelo, in January 2015. It also airs El Show del Ratón, which Entravision syndicates from KDLD/KDLE in Los Angeles to 11 of its La Tricolor stations.
