= KREN-TV =

Television station in Reno, Nevada

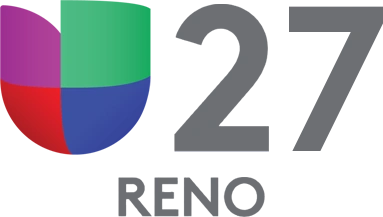
- Reno, Nevada; United States
- Channels: Digital: 26 (UHF); Virtual: 27
- Branding: Univision 27; Noticias Univision Nevada (newscasts)

Programming
- Affiliations: 27.1: Univision; for others, see § Subchannels

Ownership
- Owner: Entravision Communications; (Entravision Holdings, LLC)
- Sister stations: KRNS-CD, KRNV-FM

History
- Founded: March 1, 1982
- First air date: October 8, 1986
- Former channel numbers: Analog: 27 (UHF, 1986–2009)
- Former affiliations: SIN/Univision (1986–1994); Independent (1994–1995); The WB (1995–2000, 2002–2006); Pax TV (secondary 1998–2000, primary 2000–2002); The CW (2006–April 2009, 27.2 August 2009–2018); UniMás (27.3, via KRNS-CD, until 2019)
- Call sign meaning: Reno

Technical information
- Licensing authority: FCC
- Facility ID: 51493
- ERP: 1,000 kW
- HAAT: 896 m (2,940 ft)
- Transmitter coordinates: 39°18′46.6″N 119°53′2.6″W

Links
- Public license information: Public file; LMS
- Website: noticiasreno.com

KREN-TV (channel 27) is a television station in Reno, Nevada, United States, affiliated with the Spanish-language network Univision. It is owned by Entravision Communications alongside low-power, Class A UniMás affiliate KRNS-CD (channel 46). The two stations share studios on Wells Avenue in Reno; KREN-TV's transmitter is located on Slide Mountain between SR 431 and I-580/US 395/US 395 ALT in unincorporated Washoe County.

== History ==
The station was founded on March 1, 1982, and first signed on in October 1986 as an affiliate of the Spanish International Network (the predecessor to Univision). It was owned by the Sainte Broadcasting Group, a company that was partially related to the later Sainte Partners II, L.P. Pappas Telecasting acquired the station at the end of 1994 and converted it to an English-language general entertainment station, taking the WB affiliation when that network launched on January 11, 1995. When Paxson Communications launched Pax TV in 1998, KREN took on a secondary affiliation with that network. In 2000, KREN lost the WB affiliation to the newly launched cable-only The WB 100+ channel known by the fictitious call letters KWBV ("WB6"). In 2002, the WB affiliation was moved back to KREN, effectively merging the two channels since KREN then took over the channel 6 position on cable. Pax TV's successor, Ion Television, would not return to Reno until 2018, when KTVN (channel 2) began carrying it on its third subchannel. The cable channel 6 position is now used by KRNS-CD.

When The WB merged with UPN to create The CW in 2006, KREN became one of the charter affiliates of that network, with most of its programming provided by The CW Plus. On May 10, 2008, 13 of Pappas' stations, including KREN-TV and KAZR-CA, filed for Chapter 11 bankruptcy protection. Pappas cited "the extremely difficult business climate for television stations across the country" in papers filed with the U.S. Bankruptcy Court in Wilmington, Delaware. The company reported in court filings that it has more than $536 million in debt and $460 million in assets. Problems that led to bankruptcy included poor performance of The CW network, its now-former involvement with Azteca América, and preparations for the 2009 analog shutdown.

KREN's logo from April 1, 2009, through December 31, 2012

On September 17, 2008, bankruptcy trustee E. Roger Williams put KREN under contract to Entravision Communications for $4 million, which doubled as a minimum bid for the station as it went up for auction in late October. Since that time, there were no suitable bids for either KREN or KAZR-CA, and Entravision officially assumed ownership on April 1, 2009. On that day, Entravision moved Univision programming from KNVV-LP back to KREN's main channel while it moved The CW to what was then KAZR-CA (now KRNS-CD), thus displacing that station's former TuVision affiliation. That station had been rebroadcast on KREN's second digital subchannel for some time before the sale to Entravision was finalized (and this arrangement continues to this day under Entravision). The affiliation switch effectively returned KREN to its Spanish-language roots. Around August 2009, KREN began to rebroadcast KNVV-LP (which became a TeleFutura [now UniMás] affiliate after the main KREN channel took over the Univision affiliation) on a new third subchannel.

During Pappas' ownership, KREN's main digital signal was broadcast in 1080i HDTV with a 16:9 aspect ratio. However, when Entravision took over the primary KREN digital signal reverted to 480i SDTV with a 4:3 aspect ratio as all programs which aired on Univision at the time were still produced entirely in that format (and many such programs were produced in studios which still used analog video equipment rather than digital video equipment). However, as Univision transitioned to HD programming in 2010, KREN's signal remained in 4:3 SD until the spring of 2010 when the station's main signal was upgraded back to 1080i transmissions.

== News operation ==
On December 27, 2006, KREN launched a one-hour newscast at 10 p.m., the first HD newscast on a CW station, as well as Reno's only prime time local newscast. The station adopted the "Videojournalist" model of news gathering whereby the reporter is also the photographer and editor. On June 1, 2007, KREN severed its ties with local ABC affiliate KOLO-TV, which originally produced a 10 p.m. newscast for KREN.

Weekend 10 p.m. shows were launched in late 2007.

In January 2008, all KREN newscasts were scaled back to 30 minutes, instead of the previous 1 hour. Weekend KAZR Spanish language newscasts were canceled, but the weekday KAZR news shows remained an hour long.

On March 11, 2008, KREN and KAZR canceled all newscasts, and dismissed the entire news staff. Pappas Telecasting cited low advertising revenue as the reason for the cancellation.

After Entravision took over in April 2009, a local Spanish-language newscast was initially expected to return to KREN. However, in October 2009, KREN began carrying the 6 p.m. and 11 p.m. newscasts of Las Vegas sister station KINC, with Reno-specific inserts produced by reporter Anya Archinga and videojournalist Enrique Chiabra.

== Technical information ==
=== Subchannels ===
The station's signal is multiplexed:

Subchannels of KREN-TV
Channel	Res.	Short name	Programming
27.1	1080i	Univisn	Univision
27.3	480i	TruCrime	True Crime Network
27.4	480i	Bounce	Bounce TV
27.6	480i	Majstad	Majestad TV

=== Analog-to-digital conversion ===
KREN-TV shut down its analog signal, over UHF channel 27, on February 17, 2009, the original target date on which full-power television stations in the United States were to transition from analog to digital broadcasts under federal mandate (which was later pushed back to June 12, 2009). The station's digital signal remained on its pre-transition UHF channel 26, using virtual channel 27.

=== Translators ===
- K33GZ-D Hawthorne
- K18GG-D Mina/Luning
- K26JC-D Walker Lake

==== Former translator ====
Until April 16, 2010, KREN-TV was rebroadcast in Susanville, California on KREN-LP (channel 29). Entravision fully returned the KREN-LP license to the Federal Communications Commission in April 2011, and the KREN-LP call sign was deleted on the 27th of that month.
