= KNIN-TV =

Television station in Caldwell, Idaho

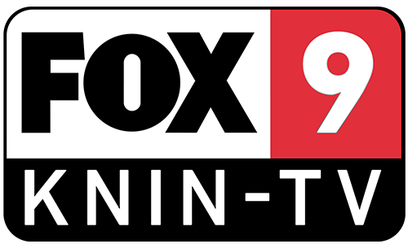
- Caldwell–Boise, Idaho; United States
- City: Caldwell, Idaho
- Channels: Digital: 10 (VHF); Virtual: 9
- Branding: Fox 9; Fox 9 News

Programming
- Affiliations: 9.1: Fox; for others, see § Subchannels

Ownership
- Owner: Marquee Broadcasting; (Marquee Broadcasting West, Inc.)

History
- First air date: December 28, 1992
- Former call signs: KHDT-TV (1992–1996)
- Former channel numbers: Analog: 9 (VHF, 1992–2009)
- Former affiliations: HSN (primary 1992–1995, secondary 1995–1996); UPN (1995–2006); The WB (secondary, 1996–1998); The CW (2006–2011)
- Call sign meaning: Channel 9, or calls pronounced as "canine"

Technical information
- Licensing authority: FCC
- Facility ID: 59363
- ERP: 25 kW
- HAAT: 818 m (2,684 ft)
- Transmitter coordinates: 43°45′18″N 116°5′55″W
- Translator(s): K18NG-D McDermitt, NV

Links
- Public license information: Public file; LMS
- Website: fox9id.com

KNIN-TV (channel 9) is a television station licensed to Caldwell, Idaho, United States, serving as the Fox affiliate for the Boise area. The station is owned by Marquee Broadcasting. KNIN-TV's transmitter is located at the Bogus Basin ski area summit in unincorporated Boise County, with its technical and news operations based out of the studios of Sinclair Broadcast Group–owned KBOI-TV (channel 2) on North 16th Street in Boise under a facilities and services agreement.

The station signed on at the end of 1992 as KHDT-TV. Originally airing home shopping programming, the station raised its profile by affiliating with UPN in 1995. It then became a full-time general-entertainment station the next year under new KNIN-TV call letters. Journal Broadcast Group, then-owner of ABC affiliate KIVI-TV, acquired KNIN-TV in 2009 after appealing an FCC decision denying the purchase. Two years later, in the wake of a dispute between Fox and its then-affiliate, KTRV-TV, KNIN-TV replaced it as Boise's Fox affiliate. When the E. W. Scripps Company merged with Journal in 2015, it could not acquire the KNIN-TV license, which was transferred to Raycom Media and later Gray Television while Scripps continued to provide services and local news programming.

Gray traded the station to Marquee Broadcasting in exchange for television properties serving Macon, Georgia, in 2023. KIVI ceased to provide the newscasts at that time, with Marquee contracting with KBOI-TV to provide its news output and technical services.

== History ==
=== Early years ===
The station signed on December 28, 1992, as KHDT-TV, airing an analog signal on VHF channel 9. The launch allowed KHDT-TV to beat a year-end deadline to get on the air. It was originally owned by William Schuyler, who had put several television stations on the air in California, and was affiliated with the Home Shopping Network (HSN). On January 16, 1995, it became a charter UPN affiliate while continuing to air HSN from midnight to 6 p.m.

Schuyler sold KHDT-TV in 1996 to Boise Broadcasting, a division of Las Vegas-based Lambert Television. On September 2, 1996, the station dropped most of its home shopping programming for a general-entertainment independent lineup and became an affiliate of UPN and The WB. In commercials, the station's mascot was Boise DJ Brad Rowen under the alias "Rot Wyler", fitting with the "canine" pronunciation of the call sign; the station's website called him "Idaho's most misunderstood no news anchor" and promised, "If there's news in the Treasure Valley, be assured K9-TV will miss it!" The station was operated by Banks Broadcasting by 2000; Banks then purchased the station in 2001.

In the wake of the 2006 merger of UPN and The WB into The CW, KNIN-TV became the network's Boise affiliate.

=== Journal ownership and Fox affiliation ===
On July 1, 2008, Banks Broadcasting announced that it had agreed to sell KNIN to Journal Broadcast Group, creating Boise's first television duopoly—Journal already owned ABC affiliate KIVI-TV (channel 6) and six Boise radio stations—and marking Banks's exit from the television business. However, it was unclear how Journal was going to justify the purchase to the Federal Communications Commission (FCC) because Boise had too few unique station owners to permit a duopoly. While the FCC initially rejected the application on November 10, 2008, stating Journal had not successfully shown that KNIN-TV was a "failing station" that could be rolled into a duopoly, shortly afterward, Banks Broadcasting filed an appeal, and on January 16, 2009, the FCC reversed its decision, allowing the deal to go through. The purchase closed on April 24; some KNIN-TV employees were laid off after the sale.

After a dispute involving affiliation fees, Fox announced in May 2011 that it would discontinue its affiliation with KTRV-TV (channel 12) and move its programming to KNIN-TV in September. It was one of two affiliation changes for the same reason made by Fox at that time, along with another in Evansville, Indiana. CW programming moved to KYUU-LP and a subchannel of CBS affiliate KBOI-TV.

On July 30, 2014, the E. W. Scripps Company announced it would acquire Journal Communications in an all-stock transaction and then spin off both companies' print assets. Originally, KNIN-TV, KIVI-TV and five radio stations were not included in the merger; in September, Journal filed to transfer these stations to Journal/Scripps Divestiture Trust (with Kiel Media Group as trustee). The merger was completed on April 1, 2015, and Kiel Media Group assumed the operations of the license; Scripps retained KIVI-TV and the radio stations. On May 7, 2015, Raycom Media agreed to purchase KNIN-TV for $14.5 million; Scripps then entered into a shared services agreement to allow KIVI to continue to provide services to KNIN-TV, the second such agreement between Scripps and Raycom after one in West Palm Beach, Florida. The sale was completed on October 1, 2015. Raycom Media merged with Gray Television in January 2019.

=== Sale to Marquee Broadcasting ===
Gray Television announced on February 15, 2023, that it would trade KNIN-TV to Marquee Broadcasting in exchange for Marquee's WPGA-TV serving the Macon, Georgia, market. The station swap would complete a key objective for Gray by giving it a full-service station in every market in Georgia, the company's home state. The swap was completed on May 1, 2023.

== Newscasts ==
Following Journal's acquisition of KNIN-TV, the station began airing a half-hour local newscast at 9 p.m. from the KIVI-TV newsroom. The newscast was extended to a full hour and to seven nights a week when KNIN-TV became the Fox affiliate in September 2011; Journal expanded the KIVI-TV news operation with 10 new staffers. An hour-long extension to KIVI-TV's morning show, Good Morning Idaho, was added in August 2014.

Upon acquiring the station from Gray, Marquee initially investigated staffing its own newsroom for KNIN-TV, going as far as to post job openings, but it opted instead to contract with KBOI-TV for technical services and newscasts beginning in October 2023. KBOI retained the 7 a.m. morning newscast on weekdays and the 9 p.m. news hour seven nights a week; the agreement also called for early evening newscasts on weekends during the NFL season when Fox had a doubleheader. Marquee retained control over the station's advertising sales and retransmission consent, along with its web presences.

== Technical information ==
=== Subchannels ===
The KNIN-TV transmitter is located at Bogus Basin in unincorporated Boise County. Its signal is multiplexed:

Subchannels of KNIN-TV
Subchannel	Res.	Short name	Programming
9.1	720p	KNIN-HD	Fox
9.2	480i	MeTV	MeTV
9.3	480i	Oxygen	Oxygen
9.4	480i	MeToons	MeTV Toons

=== Analog-to-digital conversion ===
KNIN-TV shut down its analog signal, over VHF channel 9, on June 12, 2009, the official date on which full-power television stations in the United States transitioned from analog to digital broadcasts under federal mandate. The station's digital signal remained on its pre-transition VHF channel 10, using virtual channel 9.
