= KENV-DT =

Television station in Elko, Nevada

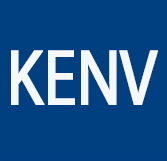

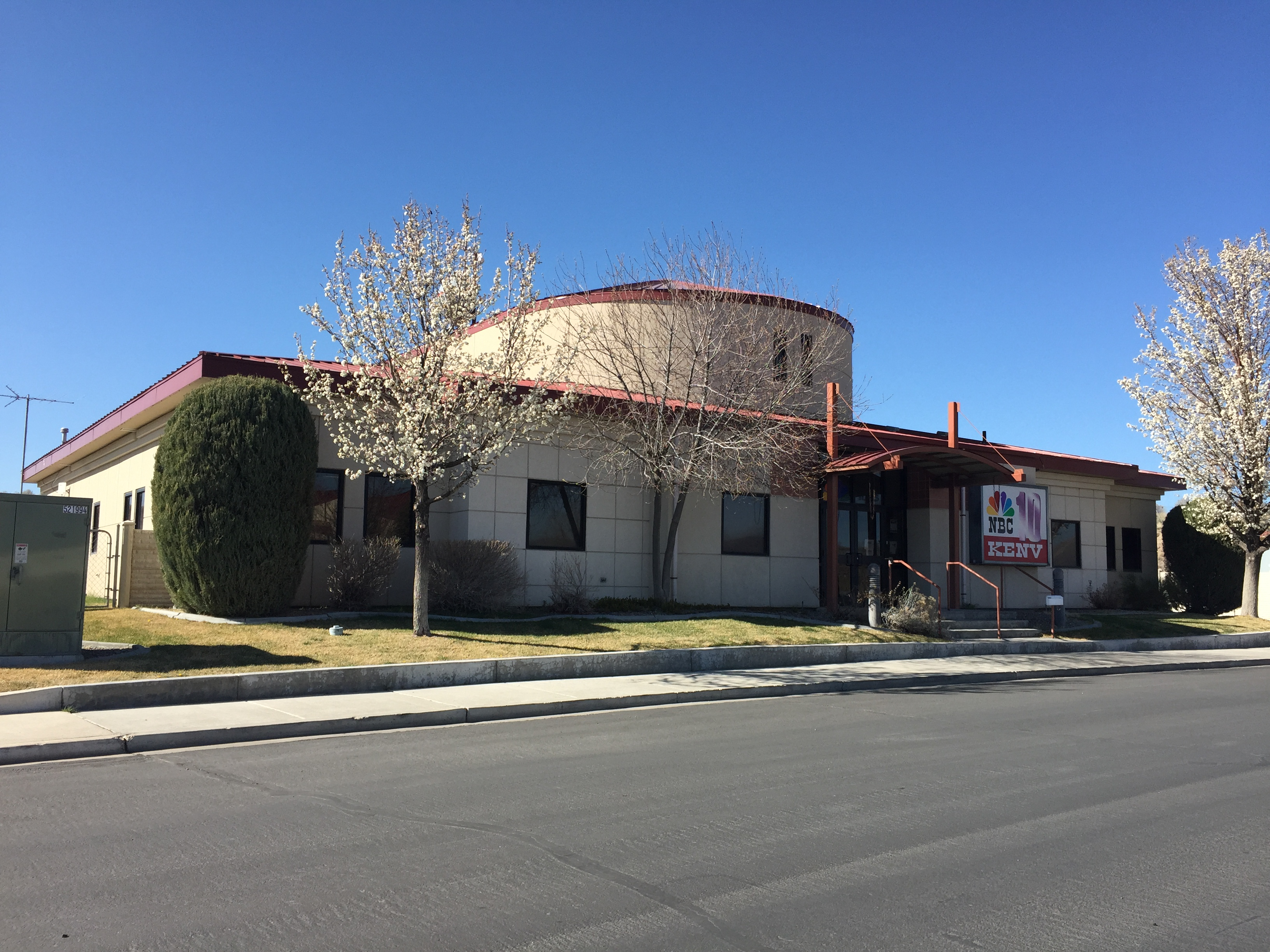
- KENV's studios on the campus of Great Basin College in Elko, Nevada.
- Elko, Nevada; Salt Lake City, Utah; United States
- City: Elko, Nevada
- Channels: Digital: 10 (VHF); Virtual: 10
- Branding: KENV

Programming
- Affiliations: 10.1 Roar

Ownership
- Owner: Cunningham Broadcasting; (Reno (KENV-TV) Licensee, Inc.)
- Operator: Sinclair Broadcast Group
- Sister stations: KRNV-DT, KUTV, KMYU, KJZZ-TV

History
- First air date: March 27, 1997
- Former call signs: KENV (1996–2009)
- Former channel numbers: Analog: 10 (VHF, 1997–2009); Digital: 8 (VHF, 2001–2008)
- Former affiliations: NBC (1997–2018); Comet (2018–2020)
- Call sign meaning: Elko, Nevada

Technical information
- Licensing authority: FCC
- Facility ID: 63845
- ERP: 1.5 kW
- HAAT: 562.2 m (1,844 ft)
- Transmitter coordinates: 40°41′58.8″N 115°54′10.90″W
- Translator(s): see § Translators

Links
- Public license information: Public file; LMS

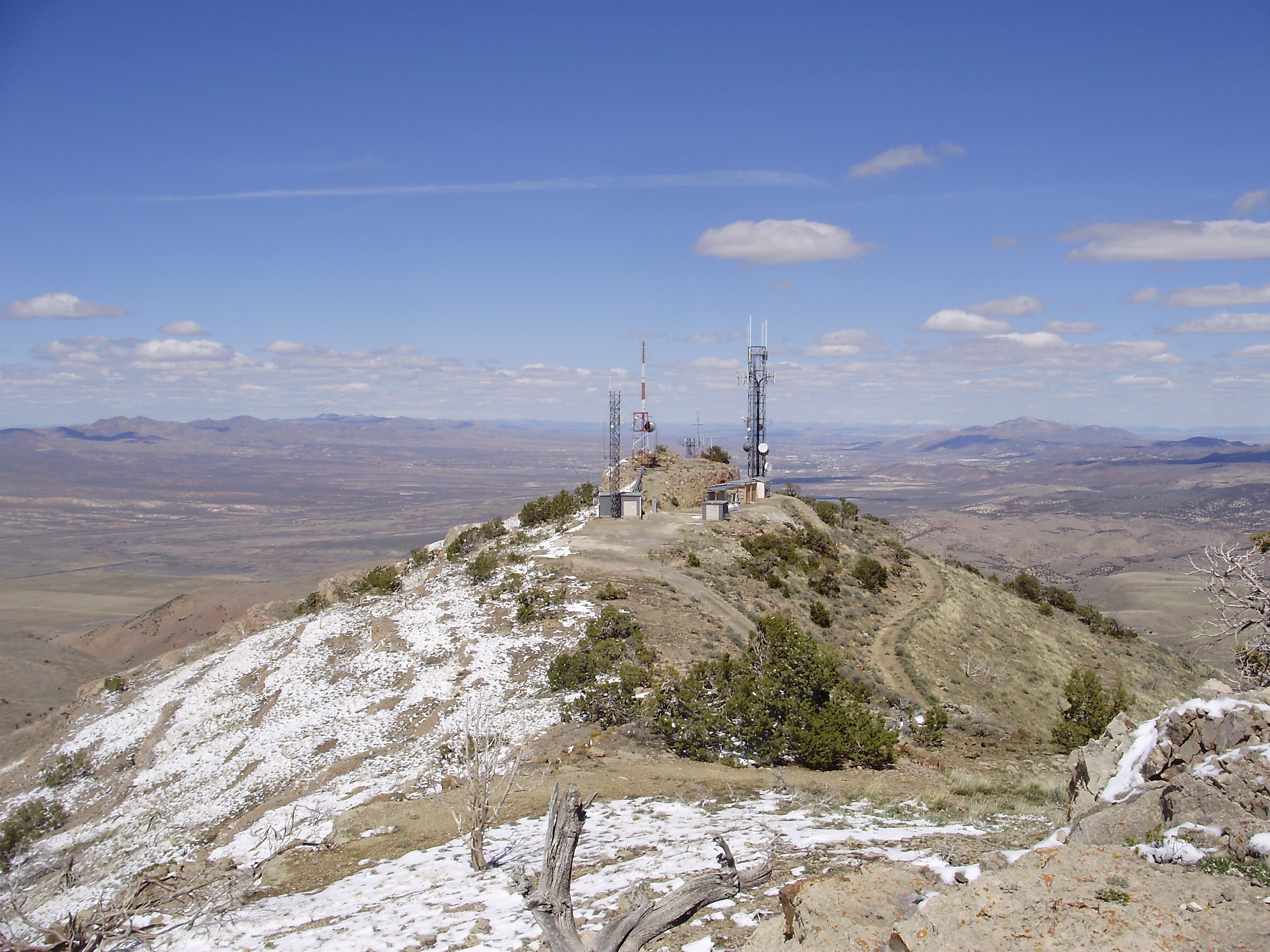
KENV transmitter, on Grindstone Mountain.

KENV-DT (channel 10) is a television station licensed to Elko, Nevada, United States, broadcasting the digital multicast network Roar (formerly TBD). Owned by Cunningham Broadcasting, it is operated by Sinclair Broadcast Group. KENV's studios are located on the campus of Great Basin College on Chilton Circle in Elko, and its transmitter is located on Grindstone Mountain.

Until 2018, it served as the NBC affiliate for much of the Nevada side of the Salt Lake City market. Although considered a separate station in its own right, the outlet was actually operated as a semi-satellite of KRNV-DT (channel 4) in Reno. As such, it simulcast NBC network and syndicated programming as provided by KRNV but aired separate commercials, legal identifications, and weekday morning newscasts. Even though the station maintains its own facilities, master control and most internal operations are based at KRNV's studios on Vassar Street in Reno; KENV is operated separately from Sinclair's Salt Lake City stations, KUTV (channel 2), KMYU (channel 12), and KJZZ-TV (channel 14). As KENV-DT is a de facto Salt Lake City market station (despite its signal not reaching the Salt Lake City metropolitan area due to being located on Grindstone Mountain, three hours away), this makes it the only television station in the Salt Lake City market that is licensed to the Nevada side of the market.

== History ==
=== KEKO ===
The first occupant of channel 10 in Elko was KEKO-TV, a satellite station of Reno CBS affiliate KTVN (channel 2). KEKO signed on April 18, 1973; it was off the air from January 24, 1974, to June 27, 1975. On December 23, 1975, owner Washoe Empire informed the Federal Communications Commission (FCC) that KEKO's transmitter and equipment had been destroyed in a fire; on April 14, 1976, the FCC granted special temporary authority to Washoe Empire to operate a KTVN translator on channel 10 (at the time, Washoe Empire had made no decision about returning KEKO to the air). On April 8, 1977, at the station's request, the FCC canceled the KEKO license effective March 18.

=== NBC affiliation ===
KENV's logo as an NBC affiliate, until January 1, 2018.

The FCC granted an original construction permit on June 26, 1995, to Las Vegas-based Sunbelt Broadcasting Company to build a television station licensed in Elko. Originally, the station was approved for 0.790 kW to broadcast on VHF channel 10 with transmitter located in coordinates 40°48′42″N 115°41′56″W. In July 1996, Sunbelt (later named Intermountain West Communications Company) requested a modification to change the construction permit: moving the transmitter to Grindstone Mountain (in coordinates 40°41′52.5″N 115°54′13″W) and increasing the power to 3.09 kW. It was approved on January 29, 1997.

The station signed on March 27, 1997, as KENV, a semi-satellite of KRNV. The creation of KENV extended the coverage of the NBC affiliate in Reno into Northeastern Nevada. It is the only full-powered television station in Elko.

On November 22, 2013, Sinclair Broadcast Group announced the acquisition of KRNV's non-license assets, for $26 million. On December 19, it was announced that Cunningham Broadcasting would acquire the license assets of KRNV and KENV for $6.5 million. Sinclair could not buy KENV-DT outright because it is located in the Salt Lake City DMA, in which Sinclair already owned a duopoly (formed by CBS affiliate KUTV and MyNetworkTV affiliate KMYU). The sale was approved on September 22, 2017, and was completed on January 9, 2018.

=== Loss of NBC affiliation, switch to Comet and TBD/Roar ===
On December 14, 2017, KENV announced that it was unable to renew its affiliation agreement with NBC, which was set to expire on December 31, and that it would become an affiliate of the Sinclair-owned science-fiction network Comet on January 1, 2018. The last NBC program on KENV was New Year's Eve with Carson Daly at 11:35 p.m. Pacific Time on December 31. KENV also announced that it would shut down its news department; its last newscast aired on December 22. The move left KSL-TV (channel 5) as the sole NBC affiliate for the entire Salt Lake City market; similar moves had been made by the network since 2014 with WMGM-TV in Wildwood, New Jersey, and WHAG-TV (now WDVM-TV) in Hagerstown, Maryland, in both cases to protect network owned stations WCAU in Philadelphia and WRC-TV in Washington, D.C., respectively. KENV general manager Amie Chapman stated that the loss of the affiliation "makes our local news operation financially infeasible." The Elko Television District said that it would rebroadcast KRNV-DT on a translator "until we know for sure what the plans of KSL are." NBC then informed the district on December 21 that as of January 1, KSL "will be the only NBC affiliate in Elko County authorized to carry the NBC programming and brand," which district chairman Paul Gardner interpreted as a cease and desist order. By January 12, KSL was being broadcast on one of the Elko Television District's transmitters, and has since been expanded to three other transmitters in the area.

== News operation ==
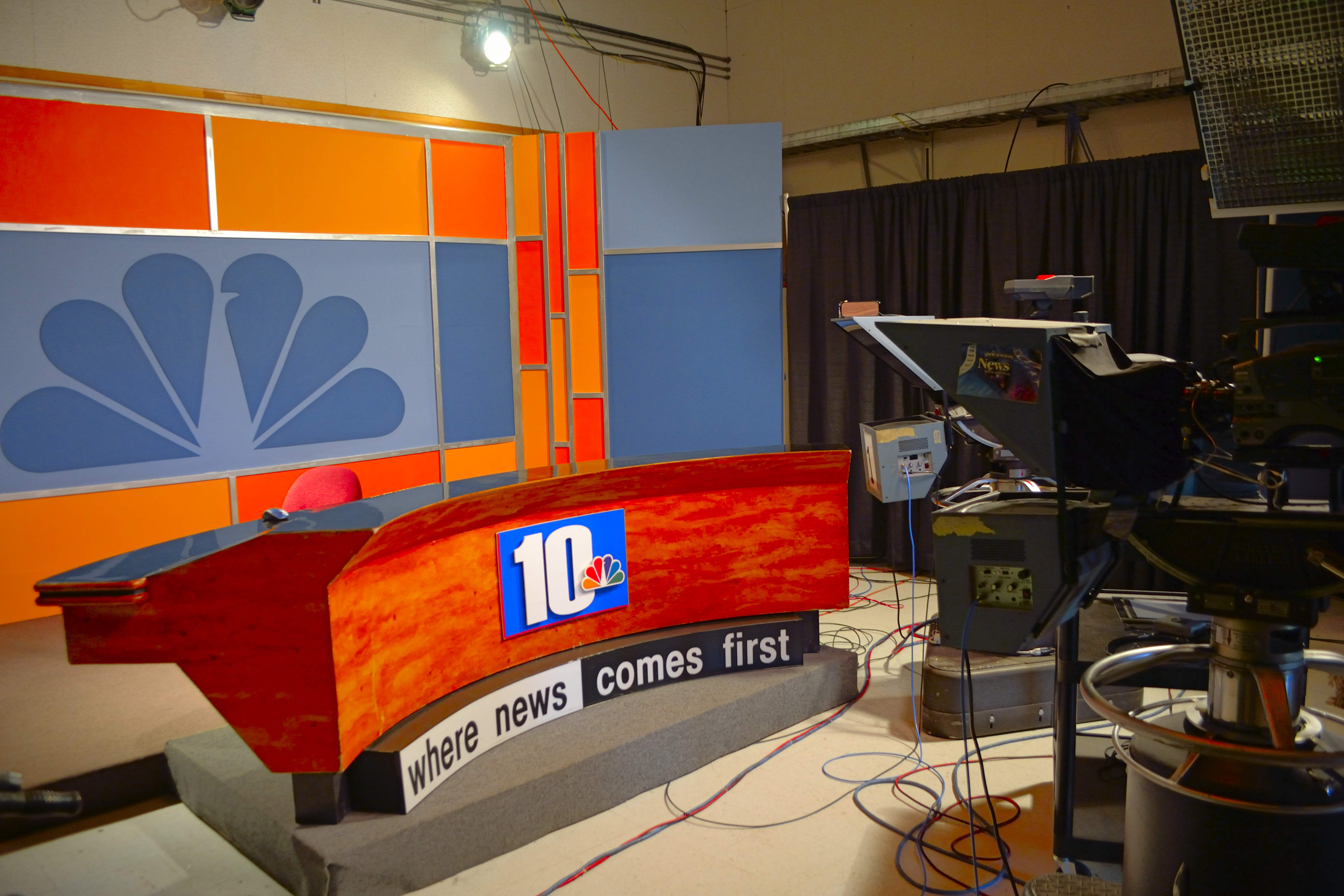
Former KENV news set

As an NBC affiliate, KENV-DT broadcast five hours of locally produced newscasts each week (with one hour each weekday); KENV-DT did not carry local newscasts on Saturdays or Sundays, but did produce a weekend public affairs program, Elko Newsmakers. The station only produced a morning newscast, as well as cut-ins during Today; all other newscasts on KENV were simulcast from KRNV-DT in Reno.

== Technical information ==
Subchannel of KENV-DT
Subchannel	Res.	Short name	Programming
10.1	1080i	ROAR	Roar

=== Analog-to-digital conversion ===
When the FCC released its initial DTV allocations on April 21, 1997, it assigned VHF channel 8 to KENV-DT as its digital companion channel. Although many allocations were adjusted when the FCC issued its revised final DTV allocations table on February 17, 1998, KENV's remained unchanged.

On February 22, 2001, the Federal Communications Commission granted a permit to construct the station's digital facilities (requested in 1999). The CP was extended 2 times, but the third was dismissed in 2007 because the FCC Media Bureau approved a request by KENV to "flash cut" from analog to digital by the end of the DTV transition and the permit was extended to February 17, 2009, the original target date for full-power television stations in the United States to transition from analog to digital broadcasts under federal mandate (which was later pushed back to June 12, 2009).

On January 18, 2009, KENV suffered a problem with the analog transmitter, forcing the station reduce its power by 60–70%. On March 27, the analog antenna suffered a complete failure, forcing the station to go to digital three months ahead of schedule (planned on June 12). The station officially flash-cut to digital on March 31.

=== Translators ===
- Elko: K12MS-D
- Ryndon: K12PT-D
- Wells: K24GE-D
