= KRNS-CD =

Television station in Reno, Nevada

- Reno, Nevada; United States
- Channels: Digital: 18 (UHF); Virtual: 46
- Branding: UniMás Reno

Programming
- Affiliations: 46.1: UniMás; 46.2: LATV; 46.88: AltaVision

Ownership
- Owner: Entravision Communications; (Entravision Holdings, LLC)
- Sister stations: KREN-TV, KRNV-FM

History
- Founded: June 14, 1988
- First air date: July 12, 1995
- Former call signs: K47CO (1988–1998); K68FO (CP only); KUVR-LP (1998–2002); KUVR-CA (2002–2004); KAZR-CA (2004–2009); KRNS-CA (2009–2012)
- Former channel numbers: Analog: 47 (UHF, 1988–1998), 68 (UHF, 1999–2005), 46 (UHF, 2005–2012); Digital: 46 (UHF, 2012–2018)
- Former affiliations: Univision (1995–2001); Azteca América (2001–2007); TuVision (2007–2009); The CW (2009–2018)

Technical information
- Licensing authority: FCC
- Facility ID: 34577
- Class: CD
- ERP: 15 kW
- HAAT: 869.9 m (2,854 ft)
- Transmitter coordinates: 39°18′46.6″N 119°53′2.6″W

Links
- Public license information: Public file; LMS

KRNS-CD (channel 46) is a low-power, Class A television station in Reno, Nevada, United States, affiliated with the Spanish-language network UniMás. It is owned by Entravision Communications alongside Univision affiliate KREN-TV (channel 27). The two stations share studios on Wells Avenue in Reno; KRNS-CD's transmitter is located on Slide Mountain between SR 431 and I-580/US 395/US 395 ALT in unincorporated Washoe County.

== History ==
The station began with an original construction permit granted on June 14, 1988, to Que Television Production Inc. to build low-power television station K47CO to serve the Reno area. Shortly after getting the permit, Que Television Production sold the station to K-Fun Television Inc. After several extensions of the construction permit, K-Fun Television sold the station to Kidd Communications. There were more extensions of the permit, but Kidd Communications completed the construction, and the station was granted its initial license on July 12, 1995.

Less than one month after licensing, Pappas Telecasting acquired the station, eventually making it a Univision affiliate. In December 1996, the Federal Communications Commission (FCC) granted Pappas Telecasting a permit to move the station to UHF channel 68. Callsign K68HO was reserved for the station to take effect upon licensing, but the calls were never used. Instead, the station took the call letters KUVR-LP in February 1998, reflecting its status as the Univision station for Reno. KUVR-LP moved to channel 68 in April 1999.

In November 2001, Pappas Telecasting dropped the Univision network for a fledgling Spanish-language network starting up in the United States, controlled in part by Pappas. The new network was called Azteca América and was an offshoot of the Mexican broadcaster TV Azteca. Pappas also obtained a Class A license for KUVR-LP, granted March 25, 2002, giving the station a measure of protection during the switchover to digital television that was beginning. The station changed call letters, this time to KUVR-CA. Later in the year, the station was granted a license to operate channel 68, but could not stay there, since its new status as a Class A station required them to be within the "core spectrum", i.e., channels 2–51. It requested and qa granted permission to move to UHF channel 46 in January 2003 and was licensed on channel 46 on December 5, 2005. In the midst of the move, the station changed call letters, this time to KAZR-CA to reflect its Azteca affiliation.

Pappas Telecasting terminated KAZR's affiliation agreement with Azteca América effective July 1, 2007; by this time, Pappas had divested its share in the network. After that date, KAZR officially became a part of Pappas' independent Spanish language network, TuVision.

=== News operation ===
As a Class A station, KAZR-CA was required to air a certain amount of locally produced programming; it fulfilled that requirement with a daily 30-minute local newscast at 6 p.m. The newscast was repeated at 11 p.m. and 1 a.m. and was the only local Spanish-language newscast in northern Nevada. The program was also the first Spanish local newscast in high definition in the United States, with the Reno market featuring two other high definition newscasts.

The newscast was canceled on March 11, 2008, when KAZR's news department–shared with sister station KREN-TV–was closed due to poor advertising revenues. Some Hispanic community leaders, such as Jessie Gutierrez, director of Nevada Hispanic Services, said that the popularity of the station would decrease without a local newscast, citing, "This is a growing Hispanic community, the news they provide at 6 p.m. is essential to let the Hispanic community know what's going on... They're not taking in the needs of the Hispanic community, and they are supposed to be the Hispanic station." Some of the dismissed staffers planned to take legal action against the station.

=== Bankruptcy ===
On May 10, 2008, 13 of Pappas' stations, including KREN-TV and KAZR-CA, filed for Chapter 11 bankruptcy protection. Pappas cited "the extremely difficult business climate for television stations across the country" in papers filed with the U.S. Bankruptcy Court in Wilmington, Delaware. The company reported in court filings that it had more than $536 million in debt and $460 million in assets. Problems that led to bankruptcy included poor performance of The CW network, its former involvement with Azteca América, and preparations for the 2009 analog shutdown.

=== Sale to Entravision Communications ===
Last logo as a CW affiliate.

On September 20, 2008, Entravision Communications signed a deal to buy KREN-TV and KAZR-CA for $4 million. The deal also included KREN's low-power repeater, KREN-LP in Susanville, California. The deal closed on April 1, 2009. At some point in between KAZR dropped its TuVision affiliation and began airing The CW Plus programming that had been displaced from the main KREN-TV channel when that channel switched to Univision. This acquisition made both KREN and KAZR/KRNS sisters to Telefutura affiliate KNVV-LP (channel 41), which had been the previous Univision affiliate. Channel 46 changed its call sign to KRNS-CA in June 2009. The station completed its flash-cut of its channel 46 signal to digital in March 2012. It retained its Class A status; as a result, the digital signal took the legal call sign KRNS-CD on March 16 of that year.

KRNS-CD became an affiliate of UniMás (the former Telefutura) on September 1, 2018, after the CW affiliation moved to a subchannel of KOLO-TV (channel 8). UniMás had been seen on the third digital subchannel of KREN-TV following the 2014 shutdown of KNVV-LP.

== Subchannels ==
The station's signal is multiplexed:

Subchannels of KRNS-CD
Channel	Res.	Short name	Programming
46.1	1080i	UniMas	UniMás
46.2	480i	LATV	LATV
46.88	720p	AltaVsn	AltaVision

Subchannel broadcast with MPEG-4 video
