= Walker Lake, Nevada =

- Census-designated place
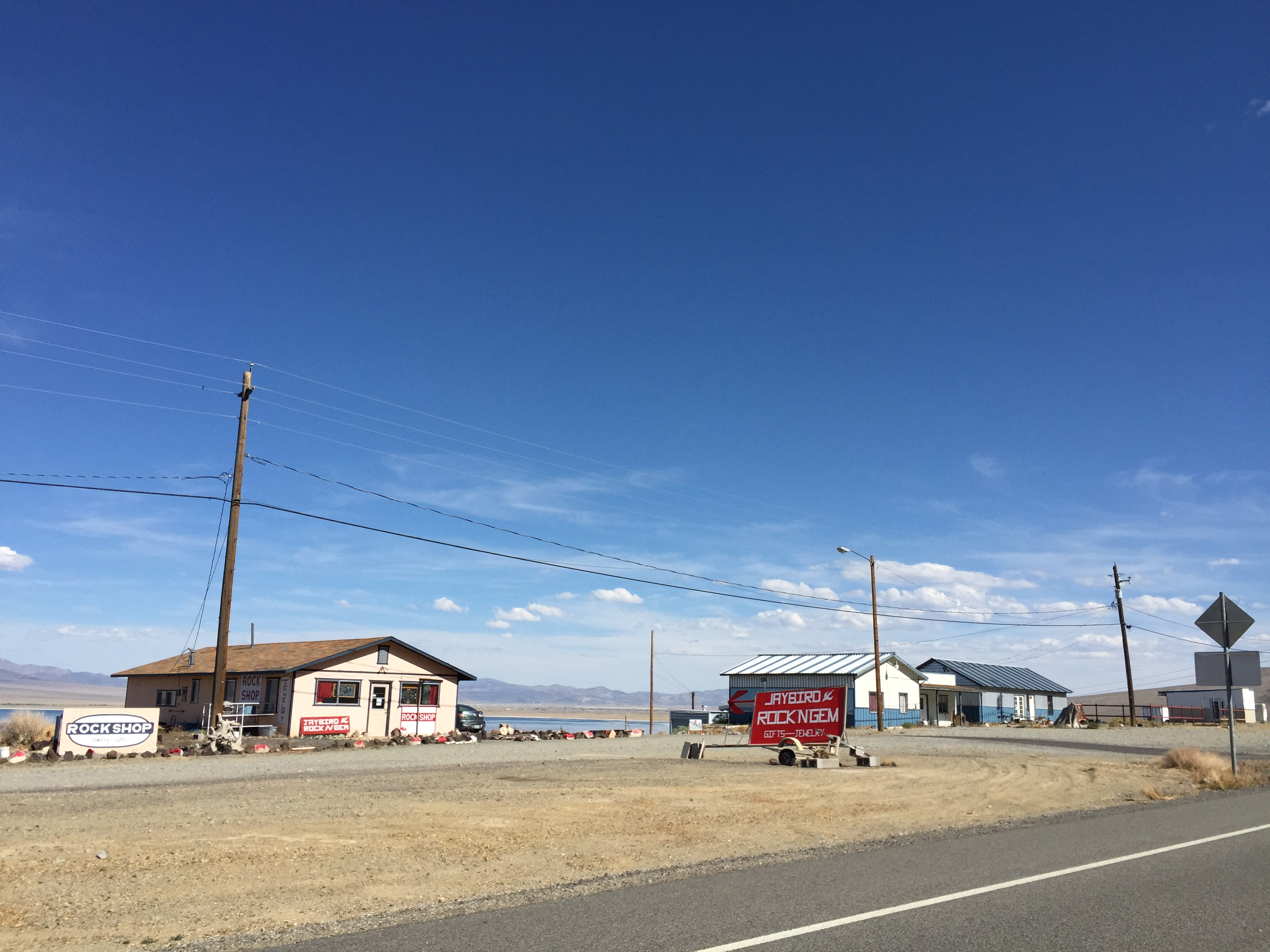

- Location within Nevada Location within the United States
- Coordinates: 38°38′54″N 118°45′19″W
- Country: United States
- State: Nevada
- County: Mineral

Area
  - Total: 1.26 sq mi (3.27 km^{2})
  - Land: 1.26 sq mi (3.27 km^{2})
  - Water: 0 sq mi (0.00 km^{2})

Population (2020)
  - Total: 247
  - Density: 195.4/sq mi (75.45/km^{2})
- Time zone: UTC-8 (PST)
  - Summer (DST): UTC-7 (PDT)
- ZIP code: 89415
- Area code: 775
- FIPS code: 32-81245
- GNIS feature ID: 0854682

Walker Lake is an unincorporated town and census-designated place (CDP) in Mineral County, Nevada, United States. As of the 2020 census, the population of Walker Lake was 247.

== Geography ==
The Walker Lake CDP is located in western Mineral County along the west shore and overlooking Walker Lake. U.S. Route 95 runs through the community; it is 12 miles (19 km) south to Hawthorne and 59 miles (95 km) north to Fallon. Walker Lake State Recreation Area is located immediately north of the CDP.

According to the U.S. Census Bureau, the CDP has an area of 1.26 square miles (3.26 km^{2}), all land.

== Demographics ==
Historical population
Census	Pop.	Note	%±
2010	275		—
2020	247		−10.2%
U.S. Decennial Census
