= KNPB =

Television station in Reno, Nevada

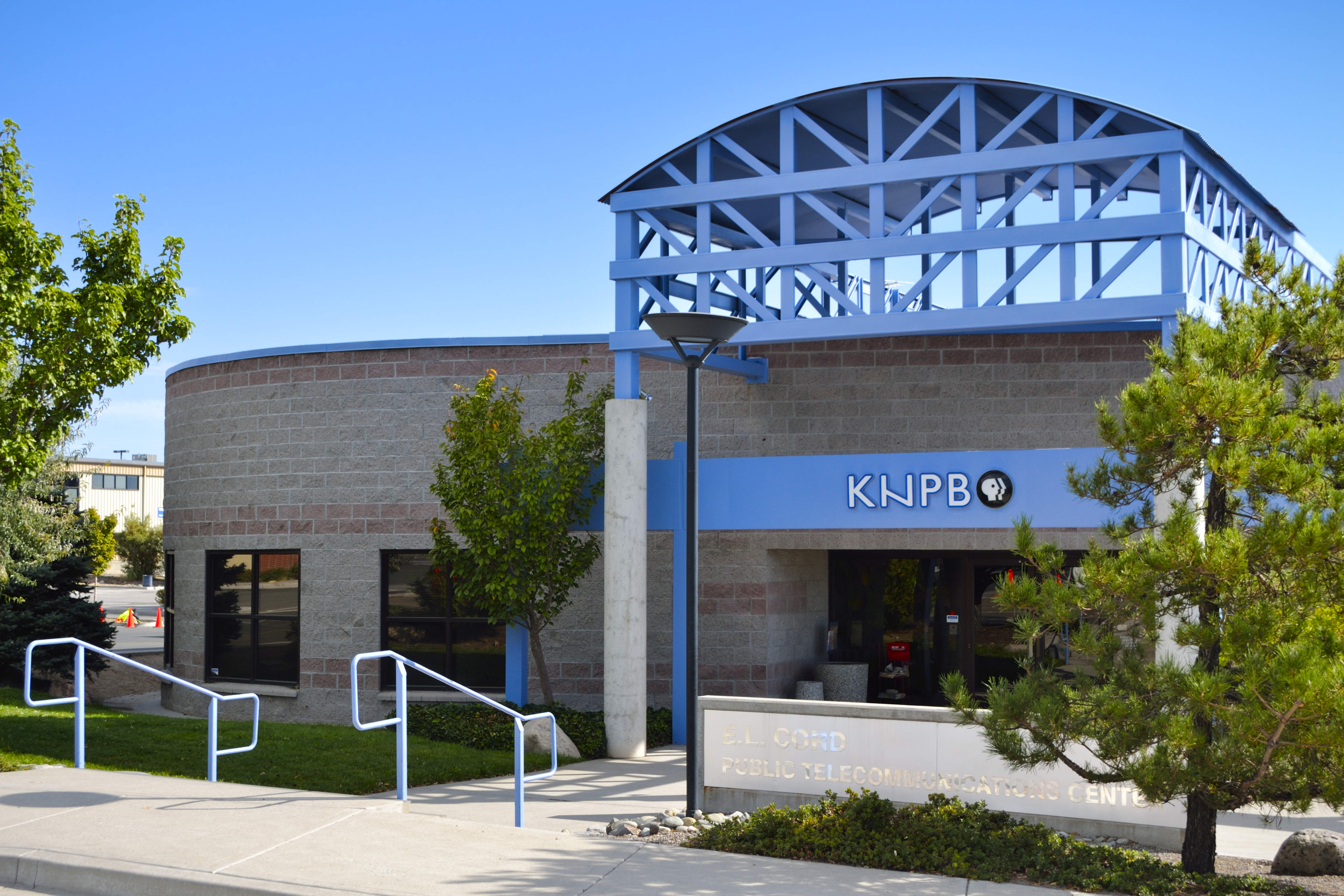
- Reno, Nevada; United States
- Channels: Digital: 15 (UHF); Virtual: 5
- Branding: PBS Reno

Programming
- Affiliations: 5.1: PBS; 5.2: Create; 5.3: PBS Kids

Ownership
- Owner: Channel 5 Public Broadcasting, Inc.

History
- Founded: April 19, 1982
- First air date: September 29, 1983
- Former channel numbers: Analog: 5 (VHF, 1983–2009)
- Call sign meaning: Nevada Public Broadcasting

Technical information
- Licensing authority: FCC
- Facility ID: 10228
- ERP: 32.3 kW
- HAAT: 149.4 m (490 ft)
- Transmitter coordinates: 39°35′1.6″N 119°47′58.6″W
- Translator(s): 33 (UHF) Tahoe City, CA; 22 (UHF) Truckee, CA; for others, see § Translators

Links
- Public license information: Public file; LMS
- Website: www.pbsreno.org

KNPB (channel 5), branded as PBS Reno, is a PBS member television station in Reno, Nevada, United States, owned by Channel 5 Public Broadcasting, Inc. The station's studios are located at the E. L. Cord Public Telecommunications Center on the campus of the University of Nevada, Reno (UNR), and its primary transmitter is located on Red Hill between US 395 and SR 445 in Sun Valley. A network of translators carries KNPB's signal to communities in Northern Nevada and California.

Proposals for educational television service in Nevada dated to 1964, but several proposals to create either a state network tying Reno to Las Vegas or a Reno-based noncommercial station failed for financial reasons as well as regional skepticism of letting Southern Nevada control television in Northern Nevada. The last state-based effort, led by the Nevada Educational Communications Commission, was terminated in 1977. In the meantime, programs from KVIE in Sacramento, California, were available on cable, and two local commercial stations aired Sesame Street. Reno instead got public television through a community licensee as Channel 5 Public Broadcasting was formed in 1981, obtained a construction permit, and raised funds in the community to put KNPB on the air on September 29, 1983.

KNPB originally broadcast from the Education Building on the UNR campus before outgrowing the facility. Its present studio building opened in 1996 and provided more than twice as much space. In 2000, it was the first Reno station to broadcast a digital signal. The station produces local programming on Northern Nevada arts and culture.

== History ==
=== Early proposals for public TV in Reno ===
In Nevada, proposals for educational television service first emerged in 1964, when the University of Nevada Board of Regents considered a plan to build Reno's educational channel 5 and Las Vegas's educational channel 10 as a statewide system, connected by a microwave link. While Las Vegas forged ahead with its own station, north-south divides in Nevada led to antagonism toward any plan to tie the fate of educational programming in Northern Nevada to Las Vegas. In April 1967, the superintendent of the Washoe County School District noted that his district would resist overtures to incorporate Washoe into the Las Vegas operation.

In 1967, the Nevada Educational Communications Commission was constituted as a state agency, featuring members from each of Nevada's 17 counties, the Department of Education, and the University of Nevada. A two-hour daily block of programs for schools began airing over Reno commercial station KTVN in 1969 after the Washoe County school board entered into an agreement with the commission. Some schools in the county began receiving satellite-delivered programming in 1974, but because the satellite's footprint did not include western Nevada, the programming had to be recorded in Las Vegas and microwaved to Reno for redistribution by the local TelePrompTer Corporation cable system. KVIE of Sacramento, California, was also available by cable in Reno. The only other public program aired over-the-air in Reno was Sesame Street, by KTVN until 1972 and later by KOLO-TV.

In late 1970, the commission sketched out its first plan for a statewide educational television network, which would utilize as its base the facilities of KLVX, the Clark County schools station in Las Vegas. It included building two high-power facilities—channel 5 in Reno, tentatively dubbed KNPT, and channel 12 in Ely, KENT—and the microwave system to tie them and Las Vegas together. The 1973 Legislature refused to fund the interconnection component, while progress in obtaining federal grant funds to construct the Reno station was slow, as state agencies feared the new channel 5 would affect radio signals used by agencies such as the Nevada Highway Patrol. Under a revised plan announced in 1974, KNPT would be the originating station for itself and a chain of translators stretching southeast to Las Vegas and east to Elko. To try and cut costs, it was decided that KNPT would simply rebroadcast KLVX. The legislature agreed to finance its share, but school districts did not provide the operating support necessary, so the commission revised its plan heading into the 1977 Legislature. In that session, governor Mike O'Callaghan recommended for the first time that the Nevada Educational Communications Commission be dissolved. Legislators agreed, and attempts to continue funding the service were blocked by Don Mello, chairman of the Ways and Means Committee in the Assembly.

Another attempt was made to provide free educational television in the Reno area, but not involving the construction of an originating TV station. Instead, the Washoe County school board pursued the construction of a translator for KVIE using the channel 5 allotment. This would be similar in cost to contracting with TelePrompTer, with the benefit that the translator could reach all schools; only two-thirds of the county's schools were wired for cable. TelePrompTer objected because it used channel 5 to broadcast KTVU of Oakland, California, to subscribers; feared signal ingress problems from the translator; and had no other channel on which to make KTVU available. It would have preferred the use of a UHF channel, but that meant increased costs in specialized antennas. TelePrompTer's protest delayed action by the FCC on the translator application. By 1979, Clark County was contemplating extending KLVX coverage northwest to Reno. Members of a newly formed group, Sierra Public Broadcasting, were not enthused about the prospect of Clark County schools controlling public television in Northern Nevada. Their group formed to investigate the construction of a local channel 5.

=== Construction and early years ===
On January 21, 1981, Channel 5 Public Broadcasting, Inc., applied to the Federal Communications Commission (FCC) for a construction permit to build an educational TV station on channel 5, with a transmitter planned for Red Peak and studios to be located in the education building at the University of Nevada, Reno (UNR). The new group began to raise funds in August to support the planned station, which received its construction permit from the FCC on December 10. The permit came days after the Public Telecommunications Facilities Program granted $815,000, one of the largest grants to a single community. The "Drive for Five" began in late 1982. To raise necessary matching funds in the community, Channel 5 Public Broadcasting held a month-long drive that included promotions by 13 of Reno and Carson City's 15 radio stations. Listeners to KBET could donate and be entered to win a trip to Miami; KCBN and KRNO held a "Bash a Cadillac" event in which participants could swing at a car for $1; and KOLO radio auctioned off chances to be a guest disc jockey. The drive brought in $30,000 and raised public awareness of the forthcoming station. Group W Cable donated an unused satellite dish, while KOLO-TV donated a tower and KTVN space for it on Red Peak. Studios were set up in the Education Building on the UNR campus.

KNPB began broadcasting on September 29, 1983. It initially broadcast from 3 p.m. to midnight, adding morning programming on weekends later that year and on weekdays in January 1984. Within a year, KNPB was in the top 50 among public TV stations in audience share, despite having one of the smallest staffs and budgets among PBS member stations. In January 1985, it built a translator to extend its signal to Carson City, having been forced into a lottery to win the license. By the station's second anniversary, it had 6,500 contributing members.

Local programming was limited in the station's first years on air, but the creation of weekly series was identified as a priority once money came in. In May 1986, the station held its first annual on-air auction fundraiser, and that October, the weekly series Silver State debuted, taking an in-depth look at one story each episode. A high school quiz bowl show followed the next year. In 1987, KNPB expanded its signal to California with a translator serving Susanville and the Honey Lake Valley. By 1991, KNPB had more community support as a percentage of its budget and in donations than KLVX.

In 1993, KNPB began being broadcast on the transmitter previously used by the low-power community PBS station Fallon Community TV in Fallon. The station absorbed the operation's debt and in exchange offered time for local programming. That year, the station relaunched its public affairs output, replacing Silver State with a new weekly series titled To the Point. In 1995, Capitol Issues '95 became the first public television series to air statewide on KNPB and KLVX.

=== Public Telecommunications Center ===
The growth of KNPB's staff strained the station's facilities in the Education Building at UNR. The station had 24 full-time employees working in a 7,500-square-foot (700 m^{2}) space. In 1993, the station received approval from the city of Reno to build a 19,500-square-foot (1,810 m^{2}) facility on the north end of the campus; it was already conducting a capital campaign to raise funds. After raising $2.5 million between 1990 and 1994, the facility received final approval from Channel 5 Public Broadcasting's board, and ground was broken in April 1995. The E. L. Cord Public Telecommunications Center—named for the foundation that contributed about 30 percent of the $3 million in donations to build and equip the facility—opened in January 1996. It featured a larger studio—air-conditioned, unlike the one in the Education Building—and ancillary facilities such as a mailroom and community room. As part of the land lease with UNR, the university received free use of the building to train students in television.

Jim Pagliarini, the only general manager KNPB had known, departed in 1997 when he was named president of Twin Cities Public Television. He was replaced a year later by Rick Schneider, formerly of WUFT in Gainesville, Florida. A priority of his time as manager was preparing the station to transition to digital television. Using loaned equipment, KNPB was the first Reno station to broadcast a digital signal, on the air on September 29, 2000. It broadcast a demonstration loop of high-definition PBS programming through at least May 2002. Also under Schneider, KNPB began airing the local program Wild Nevada, a tourism and travel showcase. Schneider departed in 2004 to become CEO of Miami's WPBT and was replaced in Reno by Kliff Kuehl, who had held the same job at KWBU-TV in Waco, Texas. At the time, KNPB was exploring closer relations with UNR and an expansion into public radio, both of which were characteristics of the Texas station. Under Kuehl, KNPB began airing audio news reports that were then shared with KUNR and other outlets, as well as online. It also shut down its analog signal on February 17, 2009, the original digital television transition date, opting to bypass the delay approved by Congress. Kuehl was hired to run Kansas City's KCPT in April 2009.

Kurt Mische, who had previously worked at KLVX and California's KOCE-TV, became KNPB's new general manager in September 2009. During this time, the station was trying to broaden its membership base in response to the Great Recession, which forced the layoffs of two employees. However, the station did not lose that many donors, and corporate giving rose. KNPB rebranded as PBS Reno in 2019. In 2023, it launched its first podcast and partnered to open a podcasting studio in the Reno Public Market downtown.

At the time of the Rescissions Act of 2025, which ended federal support for public broadcasting, KNPB received 17 percent of its budget from the Corporation for Public Broadcasting. Despite the loss in funding, station programming and production were not affected.

== Local programming ==
KNPB produces the series Wild Nevada, which tours locations around Northern Nevada, and the arts magazine ArtEffects, as well as the short-form series STEM Works and FoodNotes*.

== Funding ==
In the year ended September 30, 2025, Channel 5 Public Broadcasting, Inc. had revenue of $11.8 million (including $1.8 million from members, $1.8 million from the Silver Circle, and $2.3 million in education, local production, and underwriting) and $7.7 million in expenses.

== Technical information ==
=== Subchannels ===
KNPB's primary transmitter is located on Red Peak. Its signal is multiplexed:

Subchannels of KNPB
Channel	Res.	Short name	Programming
5.1	1080i	KNPB HD	PBS
5.2	1080i	Create	Create
5.3	480i	Kids	PBS Kids

In partnership with Sinclair Broadcast Group, owner of Reno's KRXI-TV, KNPB programming is broadcast in ATSC 3.0 (NextGen TV) format as an internet stream.

=== Translators ===
PBS Reno is broadcast on translators, as well as two digital replacement translators associated with the primary license, across Northern Nevada and portions of northeastern California.

- Austin: K35OS-D
- Battle Mountain: K19IU-D, K32CA-D
- Beowawe: K18JG-D
- Carson City: K29ES-D
- Cedarville, CA: K22LE-D
- Duckwater: K19IM-D
- Elko: K15EE-D (Lamoille Summit), K23FC-D (Grindstone Mountain)
- Eureka: K31LO-D, K33PI-D
- Golconda: K24NQ-D, K25IW-D
- Hawthorne: K15LG-D
- Litchfield, CA: K34KK-D
- Lovelock: K18DP-D
- Mina–Luning: K25PU-D
- Orovada: K27MF-D
- Ryndon: K16FV-D
- Schurz: K30PB-D
- Silver Springs: K31BM-D
- Susanville, etc., CA: K36HH-D
- Tahoe City, CA: KNPB (DRT) 31
- Truckee, CA: KNPB (DRT) 22
- Verdi: K36OB-D
- Walker Lake: K19LS-D
- Wells: K20JQ-D
- Winnemucca: K15AL-D
