= KTVN =

Television station in Reno, Nevada

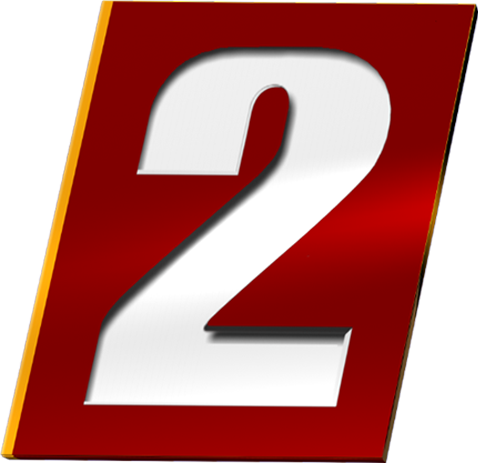
- Reno, Nevada; United States
- Channels: Digital: 11 (VHF); Virtual: 2
- Branding: KTVN 2 News Nevada

Programming
- Affiliations: 2.1: CBS; for others, see § Subchannels

Ownership
- Owner: Sarkes Tarzian, Inc.

History
- First air date: June 4, 1967
- Former channel numbers: Analog: 2 (VHF, 1967–2009); Digital: 32 (UHF, 1999–2001); 13 (VHF, 2001–2019)
- Former affiliations: ABC (1967–1972)
- Call sign meaning: Television Nevada

Technical information
- Licensing authority: FCC
- Facility ID: 59139
- ERP: 20.6 kW
- HAAT: 891.4 m (2,925 ft)
- Transmitter coordinates: 39°18′56.2″N 119°53′6″W
- Translator(s): see § Translators

Links
- Public license information: Public file; LMS
- Website: www.ktvn.com

KTVN (channel 2) is a television station in Reno, Nevada, United States, affiliated with CBS. Owned by Sarkes Tarzian, Inc., the station maintains studios on Energy Way in Reno, and its transmitter is located on Slide Mountain in unincorporated Washoe County.

== History ==
A group of nine Reno residents, headlined by KBET (1340 AM) station manager Robert Stoddard and former KOLO-TV vice president Lee Hirshland, filed on December 22, 1965, for a new channel 2 television station in the city. A construction permit was granted on July 27, 1966. After a delay induced by an unsuccessful legal action from KOLO-TV, which sought to block the grant of the permit, then an objection by radio station KNEV to the location of its transmitter site, KTVN signed on the air on June 4, 1967, as an ABC affiliate. It took over the CBS affiliation on May 10, 1972, replacing previous affiliate KOLO-TV.

During the 1970s, the station operated a satellite station, KEKO-TV (channel 10) in Elko. KEKO signed on the air on April 18, 1973, it was off-the-air from January 24, 1974, to June 27, 1975. On December 23, 1975, Washoe Empire informed the Federal Communications Commission (FCC) that KEKO's transmitter and equipment had been destroyed in a fire; on April 14, 1976, the FCC granted special temporary authority (STA) to Washoe Empire to operate a KTVN translator on channel 10 (at the time, Washoe Empire had made no decision about returning KEKO to the air). On April 8, 1977, at the licensee's request, the FCC canceled KEKO's license effective March 18. Channel 10 in Elko is currently used by KENV-DT, which previously operated as a satellite of KRNV-DT until its disaffiliation from NBC on January 1, 2018; it is now a Roar-operated station.

Sarkes Tarzian bought KTVN from Washoe Empire for $12.5 million in 1980.

== News operation ==
KTVN is the only station in the Reno market to not have a midday newscast. KTVN airs the CBS Evening News at 6 p.m. and KOLO-TV also airs their national newscast at 6 p.m. while KRXI-DT2 is the only station to air their national newscast at 5:30 p.m. KOLO-TV began competing with KTVN on the 4:30 a.m. newscast which debuted on October 13, 2014.

=== Notable former on-air staff ===
- Jodi Applegate
- Mike Galanos
- Tony Kovaleski
- Richard Labunski
- Kyle Lowder
- Rene Syler
- Elizabeth Vargas

== Technical information ==
=== Subchannels ===
The station's signal is multiplexed:

Subchannels of KTVN
Channel	Res.	Short name	Programming
2.1	1080i	2 CBS	CBS
2.2	480i	Mystery	Ion Mystery
2.3	480i	ion TV	Ion
2.4	480i	ion +	Ion Plus
2.5	480i	Grit	Grit
21.3	480i	Comet	[Blank] (KNSN-TV)

Broadcast on behalf of another station

=== Analog-to-digital conversion ===
KTVN ended regular programming on its analog signal, over VHF channel 2, on June 12, 2009, the official date on which full-power television stations in the United States transitioned from analog to digital broadcasts under federal mandate. The station's digital signal remained on its pre-transition VHF channel 13, using virtual channel 2.

As part of the SAFER Act, KTVN kept its analog signal on the air until June 30 to inform viewers of the digital television transition through a loop of public service announcements from the National Association of Broadcasters.

=== Translators ===
- K16FD-D Battle Mountain
- K18JG-D Beowawe
- K21OS-D Beowawe
- K06MK-D Elko
- K25FR-D Elko
- K36HA-D Elko
- K18KA-D Ely
- K17NV-D Eureka
- K22NU-D Golconda
- K29MG-D Hawthorne
- K24FF-D Lovelock
- K29NH-D Lund–Preston
- K12MW-D Manhattan
- K10GT-D Mina–Luning
- K29KJ-D Orovada
- K19MM-D Ruth
- K06NY-D Ryndon
- K34LE-D Schurz
- K29BN-D Silver Springs, etc.
- K17HE-D Susanville, etc., CA
- K20OD-D Valmy
- K33ER-D Verdi–Mogul
- K14JY-D Walker Lake
- K08IO-D Wells
- K36PO-D Winnemucca
