= WGTC =

WGTC may refer to:

- Wiregrass Georgia Technical College, a public community college in Valdosta, Georgia
- WGTC-LP (92.7 FM), a radio station in Mayhew, Mississippi
- WGTC-AM, former call sign of WRVG-LP (93.7 FM), an American low-power FM radio station in Georgetown, Kentucky
- WGTC-AM, former call sign of WGCL (AM) (1370 kHz), an AM radio station in Bloomington, Indiana
- WGTC-FM, former call sign of WTTS (92.3 FM), an FM radio station in Indianapolis and Bloomington, Indiana
- We Got This Covered, an entertainment churnalism website owned by Gamurs
