= WGCL =

WGCL may refer to:

- WGCL (AM), a radio station (1370 AM) licensed to Bloomington, Indiana
- WANF, a television station (channel 46 virtual/19 digital) licensed to Atlanta, Georgia, which used the call sign WGCL-TV from 2000 until 2022
- WNCX, a radio station (98.5 FM) licensed to Cleveland, Ohio, United States, which used the call signs WGCL and WGCL-FM until October 1986
