= Local 3 =

Local 3 can refer to American labor unions and broadcast stations:

- "Local 3" refers to an Alameda, California-based trade union, designed as "IUOE Local 3" by the International Union of Operating Engineers
- The moniker Local 3 is used by the following stations:
  - KCDO-TV channel 3, an independent station in Sterling, Colorado (used from 2021 to 2025)
  - WJMN-TV channel 3, an ABC affiliate in Escanaba, Michigan (used from 2014 to 2024 during its affiliations with CBS and MyNetworkTV)
  - WRCB channel 3, an NBC affiliate in Chattanooga, Tennessee
