= Teresi =

Teresi is a surname. Notable people with the surname include:

- Denny Teresi (born 1954), American radio disc jockey Dennis Terry
- Dick Teresi, American writer
- Samuel Teresi (born 1960), American politician

== See also ==
- Teresa
