= KOLO-TV =

Television station in Reno, Nevada

- Reno, Nevada; United States
- Channels: Digital: 8 (VHF); Virtual: 8
- Branding: KOLO 8; KOLO 8 News Now (pronounced 'co-low'); MeTV Reno (8.2); Reno's CW (8.3)

Programming
- Affiliations: 8.1: ABC; 8.3: CW+; for others, see § Subchannels

Ownership
- Owner: Gray Media; (Gray Television Licensee, LLC)
- Sister stations: KXNV-LD

History
- First air date: September 27, 1953
- Former call signs: KZTV (1953–1956)
- Former channel numbers: Analog: 8 (VHF, 1953–2009); Digital: 9 (VHF, until 2009)
- Former affiliations: CBS (1953–1972); DuMont (secondary, 1953–1955); NBC (secondary, 1953–1962); ABC (secondary, 1953–1967); PBS (per program; 1970–1983)
- Call sign meaning: Derived from former sister station KOLO (AM), randomly assigned

Technical information
- Licensing authority: FCC
- Facility ID: 63331
- ERP: 15.6 kW
- HAAT: 893 m (2,930 ft)
- Transmitter coordinates: 39°18′48.6″N 119°53′3.6″W
- Translator(s): KXNV-LD 26.2 Incline Village; for others, see § Translators

Links
- Public license information: Public file; LMS
- Website: www.kolotv.com

KOLO-TV (channel 8) is a television station in Reno, Nevada, United States, affiliated with ABC and The CW Plus. It is owned by Gray Media alongside Incline Village–licensed low-power Telemundo affiliate KXNV-LD (channel 26). The two stations share studios on Ampere Drive in Reno; KOLO-TV's transmitter is located on Slide Mountain between SR 431 and I-580/US 395/ALT in unincorporated Washoe County.

== History ==
KOLO hit the airwaves September 27, 1953, as KZTV. It was the second station in Nevada, following KLAS-TV in Las Vegas (which went on air two months earlier) and the first in northern Nevada. It had hoped to be the first in Nevada, but a carpenters' strike delayed sign-on. It carried programming from all four networks, but was a primary CBS affiliate; despite this, none of the soap operas it cleared during the 1950s came from CBS.

Its founding owner, Donald W. Reynolds of the Donrey Media Group (now Stephens Media LLC) originally sought an affiliation with NBC. However, NBC balked; noting the fact that Reno had only 97 television sets at the time, network officials asked, "Who would be stupid enough to put a television station in Reno, Nevada?" CBS was far more responsive to Reynolds' offer. At the time channel 8 signed on, Reno was the smallest city in the country with a television station.

The station also carried programs from the short-lived Paramount Television Network; KZTV was one of that network's strongest affiliates, airing Paramount programs such as Time for Beany, Bandstand Revue, and Hollywood Wrestling. It also aired a large amount of local programming, much of it live. Its freewheeling production style earned it the nickname "Crazy TV." It would pick up a television sister in 1955 when Reynolds opened KLRJ-TV (channel 2) in Las Vegas (now KSNV on channel 3) as a sister station to the Las Vegas Review-Journal.

In 1956, Reynolds bought KOLO radio (AM 920, now KIHM) and changed channel 8's callsign to the present KOLO-TV. The KZTV call sign now resides on the CBS affiliate in Corpus Christi, Texas. Four years later, KOLO-AM-TV got sister radio stations in Las Vegas when it bought KORK-AM-FM.

The station originally broadcast from a short tower at its studios on Fifth Street. However, its signal was marginal at best even in areas close to Reno; Reynolds couldn't get a picture at his home on Lake Tahoe. As a solution, channel 8 built its current tower atop Slide Mountain. It was initially thought to be difficult to maintain, given the heavy snow and high winds that are common on the mountain during the winter. In those days, the FCC required engineers to be at the transmitter site at all times. To that end, one of the engineers asked his father, who worked for U.S. Steel, to build a transmitter building designed like storage tanks for oil companies. It had a cupola on top for the microwave, and had interior walls and flooring to accommodate living quarters for the engineers. The transmitter building remains in use today. Also around this time, the station began building translator after translator across its vast coverage area, which now stretched across a large swath of northern Nevada and northeastern California.

The Fifth Street studio burned down during a fire in a closet. The station was off the air until it moved to a new temporary studio on Vassar Street and Terminal Way. The current facility on Ampere Drive came online in 1979.

It lost DuMont when the network ceased operations in 1955. It also lost NBC to KCRL-TV (now Roar station KRNV-DT) when it started in 1962, and ABC to KTVN when that station started operations in 1967. KOLO and KTVN swapped affiliations in 1972. KOLO also carried Sesame Street for several years, until September 29, 1983, when Reno got a PBS station of its own (KNPB).

Donrey sold KOLO-TV to Smith Broadcasting in 2001. In 2002, KOLO-TV was sold to current owner Gray Television (now Gray Media).

The analog signal of KOLO-TV went off the air at 12:30 p.m. on January 12, 2009, so that the station could complete work on the transmitter on Slide Mountain in order to move the digital signal back to Channel 8.

== News operation ==
KOLO-TV produces the only midday newscast that runs from 11 a.m. to noon while also airing ABC World News Tonight at 6 p.m., instead at 5:30 or 6:30 p.m. KTVN also airs their network newscast at 6 p.m. while KRXI-DT2 is the only station to air its network newscast at 5:30 p.m. Other newscasts include a 2 1/2-hour long Good Morning Reno that runs from 4:30 to 7 a.m. and KOLO 8 News NOW at 4:30, 5, 5:30, 6:30 and 11 p.m. The 4:30 a.m. newscast debuted on October 13, 2014, to compete with KTVN and as of 2025, KRXI-DT2 is the only station to not have a 4:30 a.m. newscast. On April 20, 2015, KOLO-TV became the first station to offer a 4:30 p.m. newscast in the market after Dr. Oz was moved to an hour-long 2 p.m. time slot after The Queen Latifah Show was canceled and Jeopardy! was added as a rerun for the 4 p.m. time slot. KTVN has since added local news at 4 and 4:30 p.m., the latter of which competes against KOLO-TV at 4:30 p.m. and KRXI-DT2 at 4 p.m.

=== Notable former on-air staff ===
- Marc Brown – anchor
- Jean Casarez – weekend anchor
- Pete Giddings – chief meteorologist
- Peter Laufer – reporter
- Vicky Nguyen – investigative reporter
- Brian Sussman – meteorologist
- Rene Syler – weekend anchor
- Henry Wofford – weekend sports anchor

== Technical information ==
=== Subchannels ===
The station's signal is multiplexed:

Subchannels of KOLO-TV
Channel	Res.	Short name	Programming
8.1	720p	KOLO-TV	ABC
8.2	480i	MeTV	MeTV
8.3	720p	CWTV	The CW Plus
8.4	480i	KOLOOUT	Outlaw
8.5	480i	Quest	Quest
8.6	480i	StartTV	Start TV
8.7	480i	365BLK	365BLK

=== Analog-to-digital conversion ===
KOLO-TV shut down its analog signal, over VHF channel 8, on June 12, 2009, the official date on which full-power television stations in the United States transitioned from analog to digital broadcasts under federal mandate. The station's digital signal relocated from its pre-transition VHF channel 9 to channel 8.

=== Translators ===
- K22GM-D Battle Mountain
- K26KG-D Beowawe
- K30LB-D Beowawe
- K36PN-D Beowawe
- K08LS-D Elko
- K14AL-D Ely
- K26KG-D Eureka
- K27NN-D Eureka
- K26GG-D Golconda
- K30FS-D Hawthorne
- K28QC-D Imlay
- K05AF-D Mina/Luning
- K16FU-D Mina/Luning
- K34MF-D Orovada
- K08NQ-D Ryndon
- K32CQ-D Schurz
- K35OI-D Starr Valley
- K28PX-D Stead
- K23OK-D Walker Lake
- K30PX-D Winnemucca
- K24KX-D Cedarville, CA
- K25OT-D Susanville, etc., CA
