= KXNV-LD =

Television station in Incline Village, Nevada

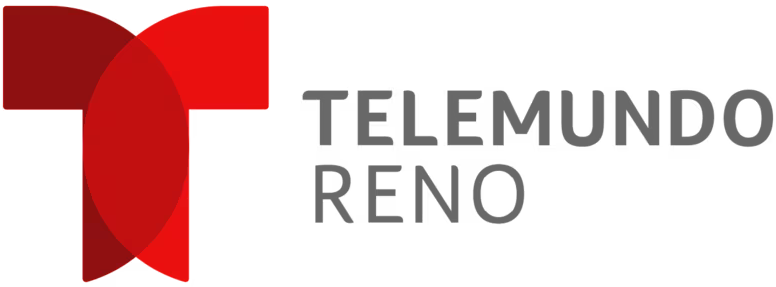
- Incline Village–Reno, Nevada; United States
- City: Incline Village, Nevada
- Channels: Digital: 27 (UHF); Virtual: 26
- Branding: Telemundo Reno

Programming
- Affiliations: 26.1: Telemundo; 26.2: Silver State Sports; 26.3: ABC

Ownership
- Owner: Gray Media; (Gray Television Licensee, LLC)
- Sister stations: KOLO-TV

History
- Founded: February 22, 2011
- First air date: October 1, 2021
- Former call signs: K10QS-D (2011–2012); K27LV-D (2012–2021)
- Former channel numbers: Digital: 10 (VHF, 2011–2012)

Technical information
- Licensing authority: FCC
- Facility ID: 184239
- Class: LD
- ERP: 15 kW
- HAAT: 863 m (2,831 ft)
- Transmitter coordinates: 39°18′48.6″N 119°53′3.6″W

Links
- Public license information: LMS
- Website: www.kxnvreno.com

KXNV-LD (channel 26) is a low-power television station licensed to Incline Village, Nevada, United States, serving the Reno area as an affiliate of the Spanish-language network Telemundo. It is owned by Gray Media alongside dual ABC/CW+ affiliate KOLO-TV (channel 8). The two stations share studios on Ampere Drive in Reno; KXNV-LD's transmitter is located on Slide Mountain between SR 431 and I-580/US 395/ALT in unincorporated Washoe County.

== Subchannels ==
The station's signal is multiplexed:

Subchannels of KXNV-LD
Channel	Res.	Short name	Programming
26.1	1080i	KXNV-TV	Telemundo
26.2	720p	SSSEN	Silver State Sports (KVVU-TV)
26.3	720p	KOLO-TV	ABC (KOLO-TV)

Simulcast of subchannels of another station
