= Tony Kovaleski =

American journalist

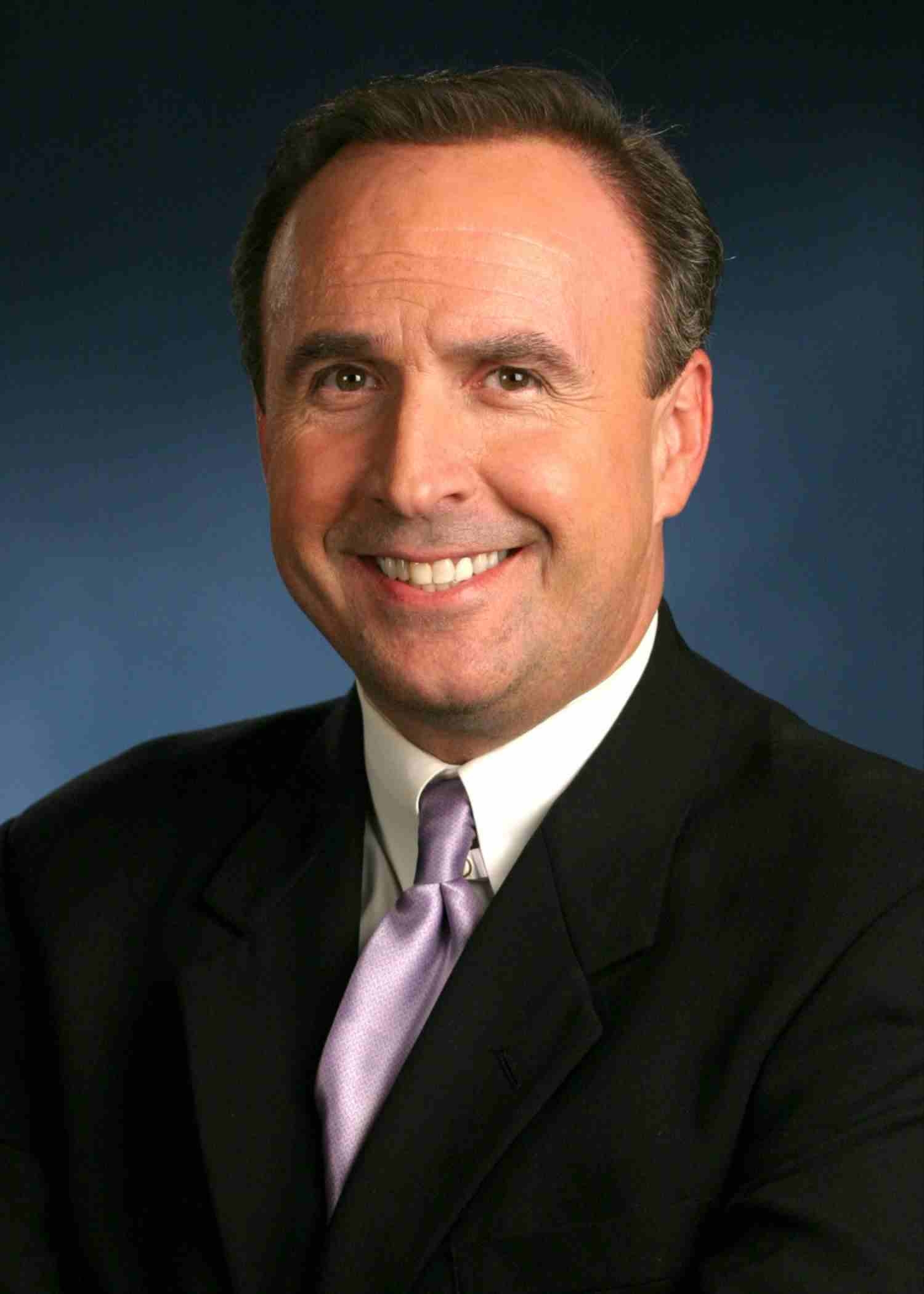
Tony Kovaleski

Anthony Carl Kovaleski (born 1959) is an American investigative journalist for Denver television station KMGH. Previously, Kovaleski worked at KNTV in San Jose, California from 2012 to 2015. From 2001 to 2011, he was the investigative reporter at KMGH and rejoined the station in 2015.

== Early life ==
Born in Michigan and raised in San Jose, California, Kovaleski graduated from San Jose State University with a degree in broadcast journalism. At San Jose State, Kovaleski was sports director at campus radio station KSJS in 1981 and 1982.

== Professional career ==
Early in his professional journalism career, Kovaleski was a reporter for television stations KIEM-TV in Eureka, California; KTVN in Reno, Nevada; KNXV and KTVK in Phoenix, Arizona; and KPRC-TV in Houston. Kovaleski first joined KMGH in Denver as an investigative reporter in June 2001.

Kovaleski’s source based investigative reporting landed interviews with four members of Denver’s FBI that produced a look inside the federal investigation and conviction of admitted terrorist Najibullah Zazi. The 30-minute documentary provided insight into how the Denver’s FBI office unraveled a national terror plot targeting New York City.

In the summer of 2008, while at KMGH-TV in Denver, Kovaleski aired a series of stories that chronicled problems with emergency ambulance service in Denver including response times that were nearly double the national standard. The stories also showed there was no permanently stationed ambulance at Denver International Airport even though the facility was more than twenty miles from the city center.

In December 2008, more than 100 people were on Continental Airlines Flight 1404 when the pilot lost control. The plane slid off Runway 34 Right and burst into flames during take-off. Kovaleski obtained records of the ambulance response showing the first emergency ambulance needed 33 minutes to reach the scene. The investigative documentary "33 Minutes to 34 Right" aired in March, 2009 and lead to significant changes in Denver's ambulance procedures and policies including the permanent assignment of an ambulance at DIA.

In May 2010, Kovaleski reported on several state-appointed board members of Pinnacol Assurance accepting gifts and an all- expense-paid trip to Pebble Beach. The board was tasked with oversight of Pinnacol Assurance including the agency's spending. Kovaleski's investigation forced an overhaul of the board including the appointment of a new president and the implementation of strict regulations on travel and gifts accepted by board members.

Hired on November 10, 2011, Kovaleski became chief investigative reporter at KNTV in San Jose, California in 2012. A 2012 story revealed that the Santa Clara Valley Transportation Authority (VTA) had the worst fare evasion rate among San Francisco Bay Area transit agencies at 7.2 percent; the story resulted in VTA implementing new measures to enforce fare payments, such as hiring inspectors and adding notice signs to stations.

KMGH re-hired Kovaleski November 11, 2015, as investigative reporter. In addition to his regular duties with KMGH, station owner The E.W. Scripps Company also made Kovaleski an investigative reporting trainer for journalists on other Scripps stations.

== Awards ==
In his two decades working as a reporter Kovaleski has been honored with more than four dozen national and local awards including the Alfred I. duPont-Columbia Award in 2010, the 2011 National Emmy Award for Investigative Reporting, the National Edward R. Murrow Award for Investigative Reporting the Sigma Delta Chi Award and the National Headliner Award.

His 25 Emmy Awards include recognition for writing, investigative reporting, live reporting and journalistic enterprise. In 2004 and 2006, the Colorado Broadcasters Association named Kovaleski the state’s “Best Specialty Reporter.” He has been honored several times by the Associated Press and the Radio Television Digital News Association. In 1997, the Texas Associated Press named Kovaleski that state's "Reporter of the Year."

In December 2011, Kovaleski and his colleagues John Ferrugia and Theresa Marchetta were recognized by Denver's 5280 Magazine as one of the 50 Most Powerful People in Colorado. The Call7 Investigative Team ranked 27th Most Powerful in the state of Colorado, according to the magazine. The investigative team members were the only journalists recognized by the magazine in its annual report.

== Personal life ==
Kovaleski is a cousin of Dan Benishek, a Republican member of the United States House of Representatives representing Michigan's 1st congressional district from 2011 to 2017.
