= KSJS =

Radio station at San Jose State University

Coordinates: 37.209°N 121.776°W

- San Jose, California; United States
- Broadcast area: Santa Clara Valley
- Frequency: 90.5 MHz

Programming
- Format: College radio

Ownership
- Owner: San Jose State University

History
- First air date: February 11, 1963
- Call sign meaning: San Jose State University

Technical information
- Licensing authority: FCC
- Facility ID: 58845
- Class: A
- ERP: 1,500 watts
- HAAT: 144 meters (472 ft)

Links
- Public license information: Public file; LMS
- Webcast: Listen live
- Website: www.ksjs.org

KSJS (90.5 MHz) is a college radio station that broadcasts 24 hours a day from the campus of San Jose State University in San Jose, California, United States. The brainchild of Professor Clarence Flick, it went on the air on February 11, 1963, with only 85 watts of power. The studio is located in Hugh Gillis Hall, easily accessible to RTVF majors. Originally, its transmitting antenna was installed atop the Walquist Library Building on campus, but broadcasting range was adversely affected due to the nearby Bank of America Building's superior height. Today, however, its transmitter atop Coyote Peak broadcasts 1,500 watts, allowing the station to be heard by the entire Santa Clara Valley and much of the San Francisco Peninsula. Currently, the station features five musical formats: urban, electronic, alternative rock, rock en Español, and jazz. In addition, KSJS has student-produced broadcasts of San Jose State Spartans sports teams, including football, basketball, and baseball.

== History ==
KSJS carried regular news programs produced by San Jose State's Radio-Television News Center, which had been started by Professor Gordon Greb in 1957. The programs in the 1960s included a world and national news program, broadcast shortly after the daily sign-on, and "Spectrum," a college news program with emphasis on San Jose State news.

In 1958, San Jose State created closed-circuit radio station KOED.

From the 1970s through the early 1980s, KSJS was heavily formatted, with students learning to "talk up" records, play public service announcements at appropriate times and even "backtime" songs to a top-of-the-hour newscast. In recent years, the station has taken on more of a free-form approach. KSJS has been named "Station of the Year" twice by the National Association of College Broadcasters.

== Notable staff ==
- Pat Hughes, sports announcer and reporter for KSJS in the mid-1970s and 1978 San Jose State graduate, later became play-by-play radio announcer for the Milwaukee Brewers (1984–1995) and Chicago Cubs (1996–present).
- Tony Kovaleski, sports director for KSJS around 1981–82, later became a TV news investigative reporter with KMGH in Denver (2001–2011, 2015–present) and KNTV in San Jose (2012–2015).
- Dennis Terry, host of Friday Flashbacks since 1976, is a 2021 inductee into Bay Area Radio Hall of Fame.
- Henry Wofford was news director and sports announcer at KSJS and later worked for KLIV and NBC Sports Bay Area.

== See also ==
- Campus radio
- List of college radio stations in the United States
