= WLDE =

Radio station in Fort Wayne, Indiana

Coordinates: 41°05′02″N 85°04′39″W

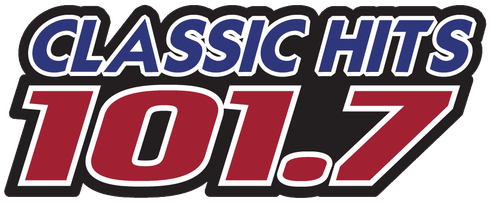
- Fort Wayne, Indiana; United States
- Broadcast area: Fort Wayne, Indiana
- Frequency: 101.7 MHz
- Branding: Classic Hits 101.7

Programming
- Format: Classic hits

Ownership
- Owner: Sarkes Tarzian, Inc.
- Sister stations: WAJI, WGBJ

History
- First air date: July 1979 (as WEZV)
- Former call signs: WEZV (1979–1990); WJLT (1990–1994)
- Call sign meaning: W OLDiEs (previous format)

Technical information
- Licensing authority: FCC
- Facility ID: 59134
- Class: A
- ERP: 6,000 watts
- HAAT: 100 meters (330 ft)

Links
- Public license information: Public file; LMS
- Webcast: Listen live
- Website: classichits1017.com

WLDE (101.7 FM) is a commercial radio station from Fort Wayne, Indiana, which broadcasts a classic hits format. On-air personalities during the week are Jim and Carrie, Captain Chris and Mark Evans.

== Station history ==
=== As WEZV ===
The station's original call letters were WEZV from July 1979 to August 1990. WEZV aired a beautiful music format that achieved high ratings in adult demographics in Fort Wayne.

=== As WJLT ===
The station's second call letters were WJLT from August 1990 to March 1994. WJLT, "Lite 101.7," was an effort to evolve the station's beautiful music format to soft adult contemporary, which met with only limited success due to competitor WAJI 95.1's massive ratings with its AC format.

=== As WLDE ===
As WLDE, it originally broadcast oldies music, but slowly evolved into a classic hits format as their main playlist dropped pre-1964 music in favor of music up to 1979. Beginning in 2008, 1980s music was added to the playlist as 1960s music slowly began getting phased out.

In April 2019, WLDE rebranded from "Fun 101.7" to "Classic Hits 101.7", and began focusing more towards rock music to put it in closer competition towards WFWI.

In 2023, 1990s music was slowly being added to the playlist. The stations main competitors are classic rock WXKE and classic hits WWFW.
