= WGBJ =

Coordinates: 41.352°N 85.165°W

- Auburn, Indiana; United States
- Broadcast area: Fort Wayne metropolitan area
- Frequency: 102.3 MHz
- Branding: Alt 99.5 & 102.3

Programming
- Format: Alternative rock
- Affiliations: Compass Media Networks

Ownership
- Owner: Sarkes Tarzian, Inc.
- Sister stations: WAJI; WLDE

History
- First air date: April 10, 1967 (as WIFF)
- Former call signs: WIFF (1967–1968); WIFF-FM (1968–1979); WDKB-FM (1979–1981); WIFF-FM (1981–1993); WGTB (1993–1994); WIFF-FM (1994–1995); WGLL (1995–1997); WGL-FM (1997–1999); WCKZ (1999–2001); WEJE (2001); WXTE (2001); WXTW (2001–2006)
- Former frequencies: 105.5 MHz (1967–1993)

Technical information
- Licensing authority: FCC
- Facility ID: 8080
- Class: A
- ERP: 6,000 watts
- HAAT: 96 meters (315 ft)
- Translators: 99.5 W258BY (Fort Wayne; relays WAJI-HD2)
- Repeater: 95.1 WAJI-HD2 (Fort Wayne)

Links
- Public license information: Public file; LMS
- Webcast: Listen live
- Website: www.altfortwayne.com

WGBJ (102.3 FM) is a commercial radio station licensed to Auburn, Indiana, and serving the Fort Wayne metropolitan area. It is owned by Sarkes Tarzian and it broadcasts an alternative rock radio format, known as "Alt 99.5 & 102.3". The studios and offices are on West Berry Street in Fort Wayne.

WGBJ has an effective radiated power of 6,000 watts. The transmitter is on Quincy Street in Altona, Indiana, about 30 miles north of Fort Wayne. Programming is also heard on 115-watt FM translator W258BY at 99.5 MHz in Fort Wayne. The translator helps listeners in Fort Wayne who might have trouble receiving the 102.3 signal.

== History ==
=== Early years ===
The station first went on the air April 10, 1967, as WIFF on 105.5 MHz; it became WIFF-FM on May 10, 1968, ahead of the launch of WIFF (1570 AM). The call sign was changed to WDKB-FM on November 5, 1979, and back to WIFF-FM in 1981.

=== Country, AC and modern rock ===
In 1993, the station moved to 102.3 as WGTB, and aired a country music format. This lasted until January 1994, when it flipped to adult contemporary. It would switch flip back to country, and then to adult standards. In early 1999, the station flipped to Top 40/CHR as "Z102.3", WCKZ.

In March 2001, WCKZ became WEJE, taking the call sign and modern rock format of the former "Extreme 96.3", which changed to a country format.

=== Regional Mexican and Top 40 ===
Logo as "La Unica 102.3"

In September 2001, the station rebranded as "X102.3", with new call letters WXTW assigned shortly afterward. Following a sale from Summit City Radio Group to Three Amigos Broadcasting, WXTW adopted a Spanish-language regional Mexican format as "Mega 102.3" at midnight on September 1, 2006.

On September 21, 2009, the station adopted the slogan "Power 102.3" and flipped from regional Mexican to a contemporary hit radio format. This move returned Top 40 hits to the Fort Wayne radio market. On February 2, 2010, the station changed its moniker to "The Killer B102.3".

In the late hours of Saturday, April 3, 2010, WGBJ again changed formats from Top 40/CHR back to a Spanish contemporary format and started once again calling itself "Power 102.3". The top 40 format remained absent in the Fort Wayne area until WJFX flipped to that format in 2012.

=== Alternative rock ===
On January 9, 2019, Sarkes Tarzian, Inc. acquired WGBJ—which by then had returned to regional Mexican as "La Unica 102.3"—for $515,000 and flipped it to a simulcast of WAJI-HD2 which was carrying an alternative rock format. Programming is also heard on FM translator W258BY at 99.5 FM in Fort Wayne. The two stations were now branded as "Alt 99.5 & 102.3".

On June 20, 2019, WGBJ rebranded as "Alt 102.3" as the 99.5 translator changed to a CHR format as "99.5 The Twenty-FM". On September 8, 2022, at noon, WGBJ readded FM translator W258BY and returned to the brand "Alt 99.5 & 102.3".(The "Twenty" format continues online and on WAJI-HD3.).
