= KQLO =

Radio station in Sun Valley–Reno, Nevada (1984–2011)

Sun Valley, Nevada; United States
- Broadcast area: Reno, Nevada
- Frequency: 1590 kHz

Programming
- Language: Spanish
- Format: Talk radio

Ownership
- Owner: Jireh Media, Inc.

History
- First air date: January 1, 1984
- Last air date: October 21, 2011
- Former call signs: KYOR (1984); KSRN (1984–1987); KIIQ (1987–1988); KHIT (1988–1995); KIRS (1995–1997); KIHM (1997–1999); KQLO (1999–2011)
- Call sign meaning: Previously used on the former KQLO (920 AM); now KIHM

Technical information
- Facility ID: 38456
- Class: D
- Power: 5,000 watts (day); 67 watts (night)
- Transmitter coordinates: 39°24′56.7″N 119°42′54.7″W

KQLO (1590 AM) was a radio station broadcasting a Spanish-language news/talk format. Formerly licensed to Sun Valley, Nevada, United States, it served the Reno area. The station, which broadcast from 1984 to 2011, was last owned by Jireh Media, Inc.

== History ==
=== Early years ===
George L. Chambers, who owned two FM radio stations in California, put KYOR—a 1,000-watt, daytime-only station—on the air on January 1, 1984, and sold it that same year to KSRN (104.5 FM) owner RAESCO, Inc., for $127,000. The call letters were changed to KSRN, and a format of country music with some specialty Spanish-language programs was instituted on October 22.

In late 1985, the KSRN stations were sold to Olympic Broadcasting of Seattle for $2.11 million. In January 1987, KSRN-FM relaunched as country KIIQ "Kick FM", and the middle-of-the-road sound long associated with the 104.5 frequency moved to 1590 AM. The separate format was short-lived; on November 6, 1987, the call letters were changed to KIIQ, and the AM began simulcasting the FM.

In 1988, KIIQ took on the call letters KHIT after Olympic Broadcasting sold the station it owned that used those call letters in San Francisco. That same year, the stations were sold to Euphonic Broadcasting, owned by Terry Gillingham, in a $2.5 million transaction. Gillingham flipped KHIT to talk, but the station trailed KOH (630 AM) in the ratings. The cluster was also falling on hard financial times. In October 1990, Gillingham missed a mortgage payment to BayBanks of Boston, which appointed a receiver to manage the affairs of the business. BayBanks wielded the axe and made major cost cuts. On January 22, 1991—even in the middle of the Gulf War—the station dropped all of its talk programs and began simulcasting KIIQ again. In June, the live disc jockeys on the country format were fired and replaced with programming from the Satellite Music Network, again on the receiver's orders.

KIIQ and KHIT, remaining a simulcast the whole time, were sold out of receivership to Radio Associates, Inc., in 1991, and then to Lotus Communications in 1993. It remained a simulcast until 1995, when Lotus opted to purchase the higher-powered 630 AM facility in Reno to replace 1590 AM. In purchasing Olympic Broadcasters's 630 station, the sale was structured such that Wagenvoord Advertising Group would buy half of that station, then trade it for KHIT.

Under Wagenvoord, 1590 became a talk station using the call letters KIRS, with G. Gordon Liddy among the programs carried.

=== Catholic radio and Radio Universal ===
In 1996, Doug Sherman, a building contractor from Tahoe City, California, was driving from Reno to Vermont to visit his son in college. He was struck by the fact that, though he could tune in up to four or five Protestant Christian radio stations at a time on the trip, he could not find a Catholic radio station anywhere. Inspired, he set out to put a Catholic radio station on the air. The Thomas Aquinas School, which he directed, purchased KIRS for $165,000 in late 1996. The call letters were changed to KIHM on January 2, 1997, when the station went on the air. It was the first affiliate station to use radio programming from EWTN.

The radio ministry grew in early 1999. As KIHM set out to expand and began its transformation into Immaculate Heart Radio, it also sought a stronger signal in the Reno area. It got that when it swapped frequencies with Universal Broadcasting-owned KQLO (920 AM), which had been a Spanish-language outlet since 1995. Immaculate Heart bought the 920 facility and moved its programming there; Universal leased the 1590 frequency from the Thomas Aquinas School, with the option to buy. This option was exercised four years later when Universal purchased KQLO outright from Immaculate Heart Radio.

=== Bankruptcy, Jireh sale and closure ===
Radio Universal moved its studios to Reno's Park Lane Mall in October 2005; Universal owner Bart Liriano Chávez also owned a record store at the mall. However, soon after, the station's finances deteriorated. In March 2007, Universal filed for bankruptcy protection, listing assets of less than $10,000 but $40,000 in debts to the Internal Revenue Service and $6,000 to performing rights organization Broadcast Music, Inc. The Chapter 11 proceeding was converted to Chapter 7 in late 2008. The station was sold to Jireh Media; the Federal Communications Commission (FCC) fined bankruptcy trustee Anabelle Savage $4,000 for an unauthorized transfer of control in connection with a lease deal.

Jireh programmed its own talk format, "Innovación 1590", on KQLO. However, the station went silent for good on October 21, 2011, when it was evicted by the owner of the transmitter site.

On September 30, 2013, the FCC informed the licensee that KQLO's license had expired on October 13, 2012, due to having been silent for the preceding twelve months. The FCC simultaneously deleted the KQLO call sign from its database.
