= Sarkes Tarzian =

Ottoman-born American engineer, inventor and broadcaster

- Born: October 5, 1900; Harpoot, Elazığ Province, Ottoman Empire
- Died: October 7, 1987 (aged 87); Philadelphia, Pennsylvania, U.S.
- Education: University of Pennsylvania
- Spouse: Mary Mangigian

Sarkes Tarzian (Western Armenian: Սարգիս Թարզեան, romanized: Sarkis Tʻarzean, October 5, 1900 – October 7, 1987) was an American engineer, inventor, and broadcaster, born ethnically Armenian in the Ottoman Empire. He and his family immigrated to Philadelphia, Pennsylvania, United States, in 1907, following their persecution by Ottoman Turks. "His father escaped to America from the Turkish massacres of Armenians, and got a job as a weaver." In 1918, he was the top high school graduate in the city of Philadelphia, earning him a four-year, all-expenses-paid college scholarship to the University of Pennsylvania where he received an undergraduate degree in 1924 and a graduate degree in 1927. Tarzian worked for the Atwater Kent company and then for RCA in Bloomington, Indiana, before forming his own company in 1944.

== Background ==
Tarzian founded the manufacturing company Sarkes Tarzian Enterprises in 1944, and was involved in early experiments in VHF audio broadcasting in 1946. In May of that year, he began operating a 200-watt experimental AM station, W9XHZ, on 87.75 MHz in Bloomington. He used the station to provide programming to the local community, including Indiana University and Bloomington High School Football games, special events, and live band music from local high schools. Because standard AM radios could not tune to his station's high frequency, Tarzian modified a small number of sets himself and distributed them throughout the community.

The Federal Communications Commission (FCC) had recently established the FM radio band on 88.1-107.9 MHz, but FM receivers were expensive purchases. After two years of successful operation of what he referred to as his "HIFAM" station, in 1948 Tarzian proposed that the FCC allocate a small high-frequency HIFAM broadcast band, saying that an affordable $5.95 converter could be added to existing AM radios to make them capable of receiving the HIFAM stations. (This idea was essentially a revival of the "Apex band", which had been discontinued in 1941.)

Tarzian continued to operate his experimental station, which eventually became KS2XAP, until 1950, although by then its transmitting hours were greatly restricted, as the FCC required the station to remain off the air whenever nearby WFBM-TV in Indianapolis was broadcasting, because the TV station's audio transmitter used the same frequency as Tarzian's station. Moreover, after the station's final license expired on June 1, 1950, the FCC denied Tarzian any further renewals.

In 1949 he started television station WTTV in Bloomington, which at various times under Sarkes Tarzian ownership operated as a DuMont, NBC and ABC affiliate and as an independent station. The station was sold by Tarzian to Teleco Corporation in 1978; it is now owned by Nexstar Media Group.

In 1956, two groups filed with the FCC to build a television station on channel 13 in Bowling Green, Kentucky, the only allotted VHF channel for southern Kentucky. The first group to file was Sarkes Tarzian. A second application followed shortly thereafter, from George A. Brown Jr., the Kentucky representative for Nashville-based General Shoe Corporation. It was not until February 1957 that the commission designated the applications against each other for hearing, and it took another 18 months for a hearing examiner to give the initial nod for the channel to Tarzian, citing its superior programming plans and broadcast experience as a factor that outweighed the local ownership represented by Brown. Brown appealed the initial decision, and the FCC granted him the permit in 1959. The station is now WBKO.

In 1957, Sarkes Tarzian founded WPTA, serving Fort Wayne, Indiana, taking an affiliation with ABC; in 1973, the station was sold to Combined Communications for $3.6 million. It is currently owned by Gray Media.

In 1959, Sarkes Tarzian purchased dark WFAM-TV, channel 59, in Lafayette, Indiana, from its owner, Henry Rosenthal. Sarkes Tarzian was able to get FCC approval to move the station to channel 18, which Rosenthal had been attempting since his purchase of the station in 1957. In 1967, the station's call sign was changed to the current WLFI-TV. In 1979, the station was sold to Block Communications. It is currently owned by Gray Media.

In 1980, Sarkes Tarzian bought television station KTVN in Reno, Nevada, from Washoe Empire for $12.5 million. In 1982, Sarkes Tarzian bought television station WRCB in Chattanooga, Tennessee, from Ziff Davis.

The Sarkes Tarzian company was an important manufacturer of radio and television equipment, television tuners, and components. Its FM radio receivers helped to popularize the broadcast medium. Sarkes Tarzian manufactured studio color TV cameras in the mid-1960s. The manufacturing operations were spun off in the 1970s and today the company still exists as a broadcaster, owning several television and radio stations. Gray Media has owned a partial stake in Sarkes Tarzian, Inc.

Tarzian was married to Mary Mangigian Tarzian; they had two children.

The Sarkes and Mary Tarzian Nature Preserve in Bloomington, Indiana, commemorates their names. Lake Tarzian located within the Hoosier National Forest is named after him. Lake Tarzian is named after Tarzian who led the capital campaign to build the camp.

== Stations ==
Currently Sarkes Tarzian Inc. owns two television stations, four FM radio stations, and one AM radio station.

=== Television ===
==== Current ====
City of license/Market	Station	Channel TV (RF)	Owned since	Affiliation
Reno, Nevada	**KTVN**	2 (11)	1980	CBS
Chattanooga, Tennessee	**WRCB**	3 (13)	1982	NBC

==== Former ====
- Two boldface asterisks appearing following a station's call letters (**) indicate a station built and signed on by Sarkes Tarzian.

Media market	State	Station	Purchased	Sold	Current ownership status
Bloomington - Indianapolis	Indiana	WTTV **	1949	1978	CBS affiliate owned by Nexstar Media Group
Fort Wayne	Indiana	WPTA **	1957	1973	ABC and NBC affiliate owned by Gray Media
Lafayette	Indiana	WLFI-TV	1959	1979	CBS affiliate owned by Gray Media

=== Radio ===
==== Current ====
Indianapolis/Bloomington, Indiana

- WTTS (FM) HD1/92.3 Adult Album Alternative, HD2/96.1 W241CD (Bloomington)-Mainstream Rock (original owner)

Bloomington, Indiana

- WWZN (AM) 1370, (FM) 98.7 W254DP-News/Talk (original owner)

Ft. Wayne, Indiana

- WAJI (FM) HD1/95.1 Adult contemporary, HD2/99.5 W258BY CHR
- WGBJ (FM) 102.3 Alternative (purchased from Three Amigos Broadcasting in 2019)
- WLDE (FM) 101.7 Classic Hits

==== Former ====
Indianapolis, Indiana

Purchased WIGO (AM) from Luke Walton in 1966; changed call sign to WATI; sold in 1984 to Continental Broadcast Group, LLC, which changed call sign to WGRT; now WSYW
