= Mary Mangigian Tarzian =

American businesswoman

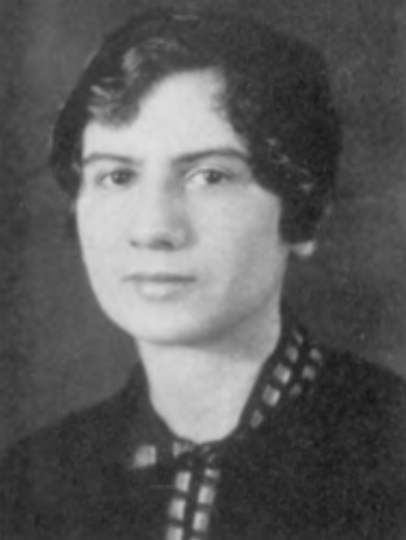
- Mary Mangigian (later Tarzian), from the 1927 yearbook of the University of Pennsylvania
- Born: Mary Mangigian; August 22, 1905; Philadelphia, Pennsylvania
- Died: June 7, 1998 (aged 92); Palm Beach, Florida
- Occupations: Businesswoman, philanthropist, publisher
- Spouse: Sarkes Tarzian (m. 1930; died 1987)

Mary Mangigian Tarzian (August 22, 1905 – June 7, 1998) was an American businesswoman, philanthropist, and publisher. She and her husband Sarkes Tarzian founded an electronics manufacturing and broadcasting company in 1944, and she was vice president of the company beginning in 1952.

== Early life and education ==
Mary Mangigian was born in Philadelphia, the daughter of Bedros (Peter) Mangigian and Nartouhi Kassabian Mangigian. Her parents were Armenian immigrants from Turkey, and her father was a master weaver and a businessman. She attended Kensington High School, and graduated from the University of Pennsylvania in 1927. She later earned a master's degree in 1928 and a Ph.D. in 1935, both at Penn, and was a member of Phi Beta Kappa. She also studied at Graduate Institute of International Studies in Geneva, Switzerland, and at the University of Geneva.

== Career ==
Tarzian and her husband founded Sarkes Tarzian, Inc., an electronics manufacturing company, in 1944. She was vice president of the company beginning in 1952, overseeing several factories. She was also vice president and director of Bynum Supply, and the first woman to serve on the board of directors of Dean Brothers Pumps. The Tarzians also owned the Greencastle Banner-Graphic newspaper and several radio and television stations.

Mary Tarzian held seats on various boards of directors, including the National Council of the YWCA, the Pritikin Longevity Center, and the Indianapolis Museum of Art. She was a member of the national council of the Metropolitan Opera Company and of the advisory board of the Kennedy Center for the Performing Arts. The Tarzians co-founded the Einstein Memorial Scholarship Foundation, now known as the Sagamore Leadership Initiative.

== Legal issues ==
In the 1950s, Sarkes and Mary Tarzian faced federal tax avoidance charges. In 1964, Mary Tarzian sued two Fifth Avenue department stores, Bonwit Teller and Peck & Peck, after they accused her of shoplifting.

== Honors ==
Tarzian was named Distinguished Woman of the Year by Northwood Institute in 1973, and Indiana Mother of the Year in 1976. She held honorary doctorates from the University of La Verne and Tri-State College. The Sarkes and Mary Tarzian Nature Preserve in Bloomington, Indiana, was named for her and her husband.

== Publications ==
- The Armenian Minority Problem, 1914-1934

== Personal life ==
Mangigian married Armenian inventor Sarkes Tarzian in Geneva in 1930. They had children Patricia and Thomas. Her husband died in 1987, and she died in 1998, at the age of 92, in Palm Beach, Florida. Their former home in Bloomington is known as Deer Park Manor, and is open as an event space.
