= Dan Benishek =

American politician (1952–2021)

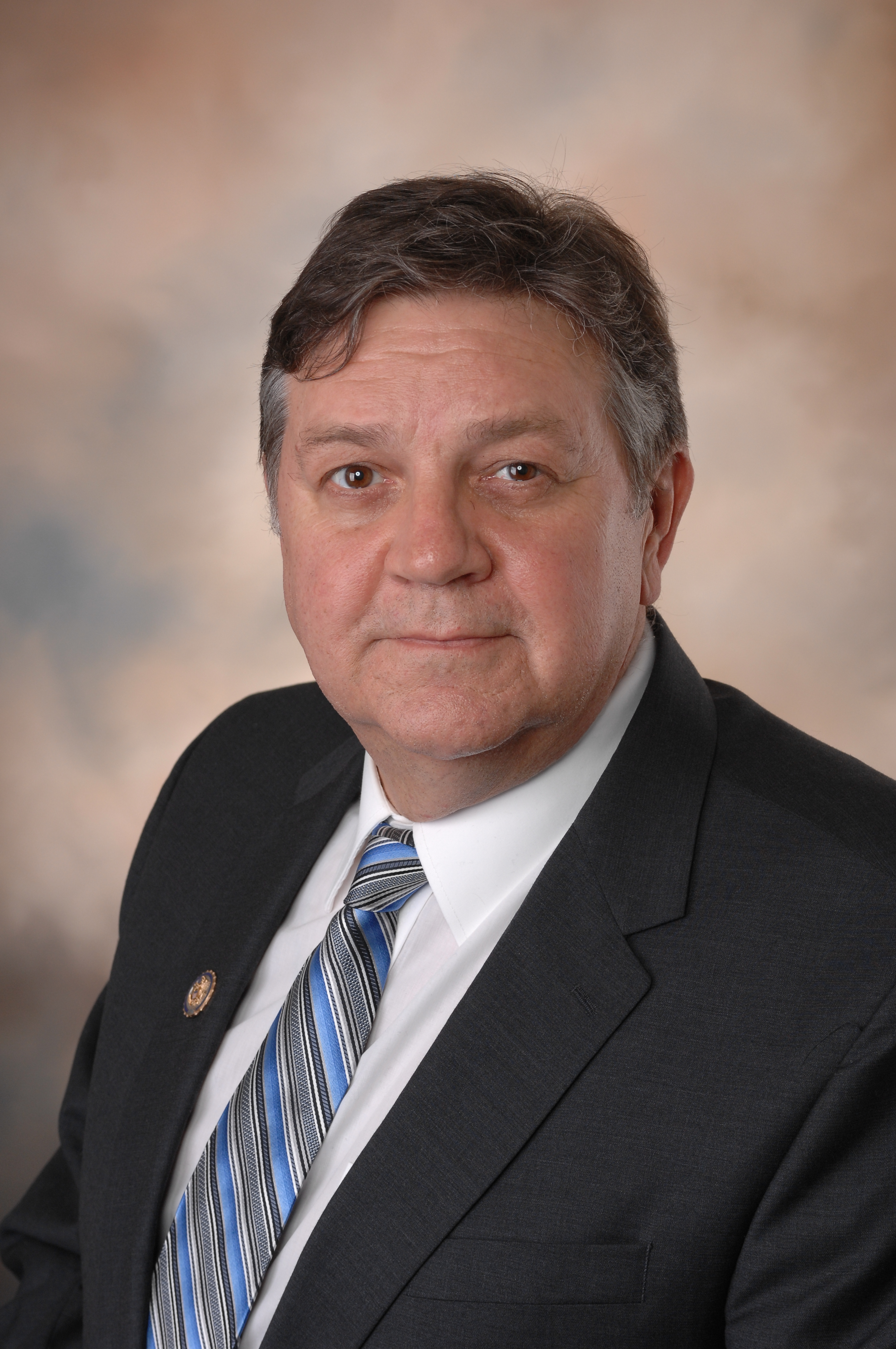

Member of the U.S. House of Representatives from Michigan's 1st district
- In office January 3, 2011 – January 3, 2017
- Preceded by: Bart Stupak
- Succeeded by: Jack Bergman

Personal details
- Born: Daniel Joseph Benishek; April 20, 1952 Iron River, Michigan, U.S.
- Died: October 15, 2021 (aged 69)
- Party: Republican
- Spouse: Judy Benishek
- Children: 5
- Relatives: Tony Kovaleski (cousin)
- Education: University of Michigan (BS); Wayne State University (MD)

Daniel Joseph Benishek (April 20, 1952 – October 15, 2021) was an American physician and politician who served three terms as the U.S. representative for Michigan's 1st congressional district from 2011 to 2017. He was a member of the Republican Party.

== Early life and education ==
Benishek was born in Iron River, Michigan, in 1952, the son of Helen (née Kovaleski) and Joseph Benishek. Three of his paternal great-grandparents were Bohemian (Czech) immigrants, while his maternal grandparents were Polish immigrants. His father was killed in local iron mines in 1957, so Benishek was raised by his widowed mother and extended family. He worked in the family business, the Iron River Hotel, until he went to college. He graduated from the University of Michigan in 1974 with a Bachelor of Science in medicine. From there, he graduated from Wayne State University School of Medicine in 1978.

== Early career ==
Prior to his election to Congress, he was a general surgeon in the Dickinson County Healthcare System. Benishek was inspired to run for Congress after the American Recovery and Reinvestment Act of 2009 was signed into law.

== U.S. House of Representatives ==
=== Elections ===
==== 2010 ====
Benishek formally announced his candidacy for Congress on March 16, 2010, running against incumbent Democrat Bart Stupak. Stupak's vote in support of the Patient Protection and Affordable Care Act fueled an outpouring of support for Benishek, who had no Internet presence aside from a basic website on the day the bill was passed. He received more than $50,000 in unsolicited donations in the first 48 hours after Stupak's vote for the bill on March 21, 2010. "It's amazing, I just can't believe it," he said regarding the support he has received. "I need to use this momentum to repeal this health care bill and I'm going to do it. We're going to take over, the Republicans are going to regain the House of Representatives and we're going to repeal this health care bill." The American Spectator called him "The Most Popular Republican in America" on March 21, in the wake of Stupak's yea vote. Stupak announced his retirement on April 9, 2010. Benishek won the Republican primary against State Senator Jason Allen by 15 votes.

On November 2, 2010, in the general election, Dan Benishek defeated Democratic nominee State Representative Gary McDowell, Independent Glenn Wilson, Libertarian Keith Shelton, Green Ellis Boal, and UST Patrick Lambert. Benishek was sworn into office on January 5, 2011, as a member of the 112th United States Congress; he succeeded Bart Stupak.

==== 2012 ====
Benishek faced re-election against McDowell in the 2012 election cycle. A September 20, 2012 Public Policy Polling poll showed the race as a statistical dead heat, with McDowell leading Benishek 44% to 42%. Benishek was re-elected by a margin of 2,297 votes, less than 1% of the total votes cast. Benishek endorsed Herman Cain in the 2012 Republican presidential primary.

==== 2014 ====
Benishek's opponent for the 2014 midterm elections was Democratic nominee Jerry Cannon. In October 2014, the Rothenberg Political Report moved the district from one that "tilts Republican" to "Republican favored." Benishek won reelection with 52% of the vote, which was the closest race for a victorious Republican incumbent in 2014.

==== 2016 ====
After temporarily considering running for a fourth term, Benishek decided not to seek re-election in 2016; he endorsed Republican State Sen. Tom Casperson as his successor.

=== Committee assignments ===
- Committee on Natural Resources
  - Subcommittee on Energy and Mineral Resources
  - Subcommittee on Indian and Alaska Native Affairs
- Committee on Veterans' Affairs
  - Subcommittee on Health
  - Subcommittee on Oversight and Investigations

=== Legislation sponsored ===
On January 4, 2013, Benishek introduced H.R. 163, a bill identical to the Sleeping Bear Dunes National Lakeshore Conservation and Recreation Act (S. 23; 113th Congress), which was introduced into the U.S. Senate by Carl Levin. The bill would designate as wilderness about 32,500 acres of the Sleeping Bear Dunes National Lakeshore in the state of Michigan. The newly designated lands and inland waterways would comprise the Sleeping Bear Dunes Wilderness, a new component of the National Wilderness Preservation System. Benishek expressed his pleasure that the bill "was developed locally," describing it as "the ideal way federal land management should occur, with input from the local communities." The Senate version, S. 23, passed the Senate and was signed into law by President Obama on March 13, 2014.

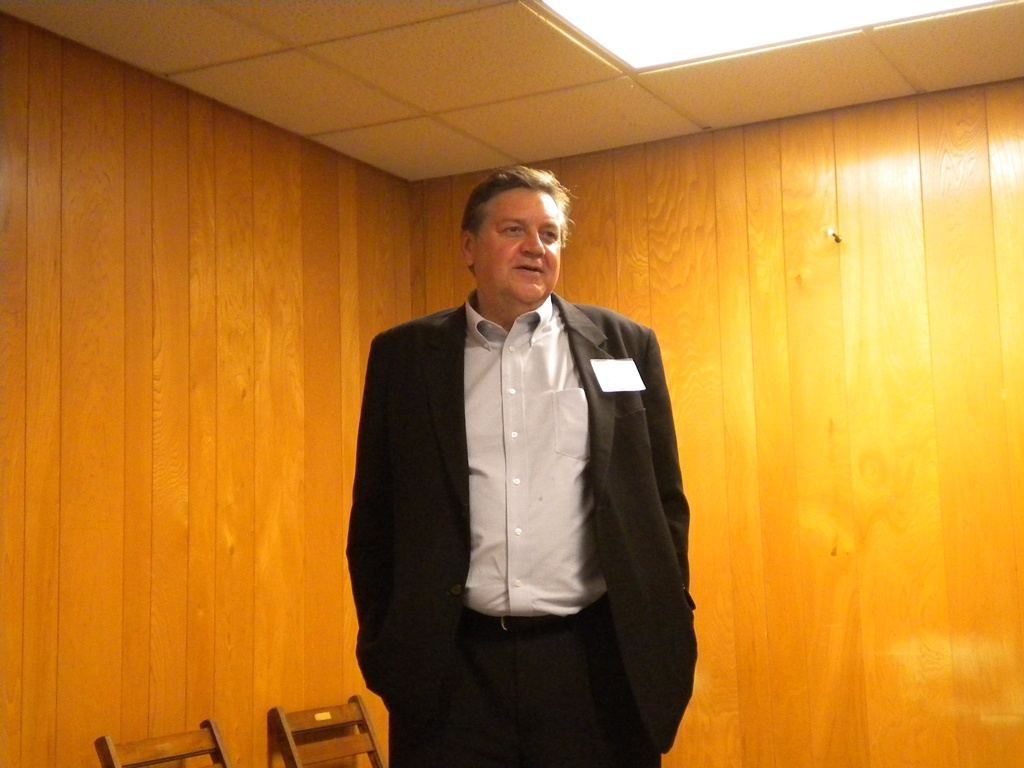
Benishek speaks at a reception at the Republican Party headquarters in Bay County

On May 21, 2013, Benishek introduced the Demanding Accountability for Veterans Act of 2013 (H.R. 2072; 113th Congress), a bill that would require the Inspector General (IG) of the United States Department of Veterans Affairs (VA) to take additional action if the VA has not appropriately responded to an IG report that recommends actions to be taken by the Secretary of Veterans Affairs to address a VA public health or safety issue. The Secretary would be required to act swiftly on such IG reports, with the bill specifying actions to take. The Secretary would also be forbidden from giving any bonuses to managers with unresolved issues. Benishek said that the bill targets "bureaucrats in Washington who drag their feet and don't do their jobs."

== Political positions ==
Benishek favored reduced government spending and a smaller government, and was pro-life and pro-gun rights. In 2012, he was endorsed by the National Rifle Association Political Victory Fund, and in 2014 received an A+ Grade and continued endorsement. He supported term limits and said before he was elected in 2010, "I am happy to tell voters I strongly favor term limits. Three terms and you're retired seems about right to me." He was also a signatory to a pledge by U.S. Term Limits that would impose a three-term limit on Congressmen. However, in March 2015, Benishek announced he would break that pledge and run for a 4th term. In September 2015, he reverted course, announcing that he would in fact retire at the end of his current term rather than seeing re-election in 2016. In healthcare reform, he supported tort reform and allowing insurance companies to compete across state lines without federal regulation. He opposed federal funding for elective abortions. He supported lower taxes and increased border security. Benishek dismissed the scientific consensus on climate change.

== Personal life and death ==
Benishek lived with his wife, Judy, in Iron County. They had five children. Investigative journalist Tony Kovaleski is his cousin. Benishek suddenly died on October 15, 2021, at the age of 69 from heart related issues.

== Electoral history ==
Michigan's 1st congressional district Republican primary, August 3, 2010
| Party | Candidate | Votes | % |
|---|---|---|---|
| Republican | Dan Benishek | 27,077 | 38.14 |
| Republican | Jason Allen | 27,062 | 38.12 |
| Republican | Tom Stillings | 5,418 | 7.63 |
| Republican | Linda Goldthorpe | 4,980 | 7.01 |
| Republican | Don Hooper | 3,969 | 5.59 |
| Republican | Patrick Donlon | 2,490 | 3.51 |
| Total votes | | 70,996 | 100.00 |

Michigan's 1st congressional district general election, November 2, 2010
| Party | Candidate | Votes | % |
|---|---|---|---|
| Republican | Dan Benishek | 120,523 | 51.94 |
| Democratic | Gary McDowell | 94,824 | 40.87 |
| Independent | Glenn Wilson | 7,847 | 3.38 |
| U.S. Taxpayers | Patrick Lambert | 4,200 | 1.81 |
| Libertarian | Keith Shelton | 2,571 | 1.11 |
| Green | Ellis Boal | 2,072 | 0.89 |
| Total votes | | 232,037 | 100.00 |

Michigan's 1st congressional district, 2012
| Party | Candidate | Votes | % |
|---|---|---|---|
| Republican | Dan Benishek (incumbent) | 167,060 | 48.1 |
| Democratic | Gary McDowell | 165,179 | 47.6 |
| Libertarian | Emily Salvette | 10,630 | 3.1 |
| Green | Ellis Boal | 4,168 | 1.2 |
| Total votes | | 347,037 | 100.0 |
| Republican hold | | | |

Michigan's 1st congressional district, 2014
| Party | Candidate | Votes | % |
|---|---|---|---|
| Republican | Dan Benishek (incumbent) | 130,414 | 52.1 |
| Democratic | Jerry Cannon | 113,263 | 45.3 |
| Libertarian | Loel Gnadt | 3,823 | 1.5 |
| Green | Ellis Boal | 2,631 | 1.1 |
| Total votes | | 250,131 | 100.0 |
| Republican hold | | | |

== See also ==
- Physicians in the United States Congress

U.S. House of Representatives
| Preceded by Bart Stupak | Member of the U.S. House of Representatives from Michigan's 1st congressional district 2011–2017 | Succeeded by Jack Bergman |
