= WAJI =

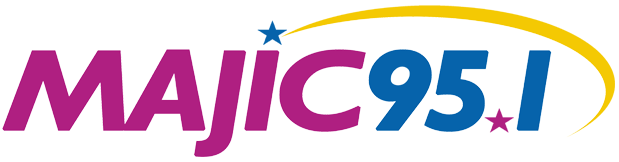
- Fort Wayne, Indiana; United States
- Broadcast area: Fort Wayne metropolitan area
- Frequency: 95.1 MHz (HD Radio)
- Branding: Majic 95.1

Programming
- Format: Hot adult contemporary
- Subchannels: HD2: WGBJ simulcast (alternative rock)
- Affiliations: Premiere Networks

Ownership
- Owner: Sarkes Tarzian, Inc.
- Sister stations: WLDE; WGBJ

History
- First air date: 1959 (as WPTH)
- Former call signs: WPTH (1959–1981); WFWQ (1982–1985)
- Call sign meaning: "Majic"

Technical information
- Licensing authority: FCC
- Facility ID: 59132
- Class: B
- ERP: 39,000 watts
- HAAT: 207 meters (679 ft)
- Transmitter coordinates: 41°6′13.1″N 85°11′27.8″W
- Translator: HD2: 99.5 W258BY (Fort Wayne)

Links
- Public license information: Public file; LMS
- Webcast: Listen live
- Website: www.majic951.com

WAJI (95.1 FM) is a commercial radio station broadcasting a hot adult contemporary format. Licensed to Fort Wayne, Indiana, United States, the station is owned by Bloomington–based Sarkes Tarzian, Inc.

WAJI broadcasts in HD, with its HD2 channel simulcasting sister station WGBJ. Its HD3 channel used to broadcast a "Top 20" CHR format The HD3 channel has since been turned off.

== History ==
WAJI was known as WPTH throughout the 1960s and 1970s as a sister station to WPTA television, and in the summer of 1974, the station branded themselves as "Rock 95", using TM Productions' "Stereo Rock" Top 40 reel to reel automation package. The station went live in 1979, and changed calls in 1981 to WFWQ (95Q), continuing to do battle with 97.3 WMEE for the Top 40/CHR audience in Fort Wayne. The station ended up mellowed to adult contemporary, eventually changing to its current WAJI calls and imaging in 1985. "Majic 95" soon once again became one of Fort Wayne's top-rated stations, reaching #1 in the market several times during the late 1980s. Throughout the decade, the station originally had an effective radiated power of 44,000 watts.

On March 20, 2014, WAJI changed names to "BEST FM 95.1". The station lineup consisted of "The BEST-FM Morning Show" with Sid Kelly, Angie Nash and James Raggi. Mandi Michaels, program director Dan Kennedy and Dave B. Goode (who also served as the station's promotions director). Angie Nash spent the previous ten years of her career at cross-town WJFX before joining the morning show. Afternoons were handled by Dan Kennedy who also serves as the stations' director of programming. Kennedy was VP/Programming for Grenax Broadcasting in Arizona prior to his arrival in Fort Wayne in 2012. Dave B. Goode hosts weeknights after spending several years at stations such as crosstown WBTU and WNHT. Dave also serves as the station's Promotions Director. After changing formats, BEST-FM brought in several new staff members. On June 23, 2014, it was announced that James Raggi would join Angie Nash for mornings after spending three years as an intern/producer in Boston's WXKS-FM.

In September 2014, Mandi Michaels joined the staff as the new mid-day personality. The following month on October 24, 2014, Best FM announced the hiring of Sid Kelly. Sid was brought in to be the new host of the morning show, joining Angie and James. Sid Kelly came to WAJI after spending 3 1/2 years at WVKS in Toledo. In July 2015, program director/afternoon personality Dan Kennedy announced he was leaving the station after four years to take a job outside of radio. In September 2015 Captain Chris (Didier) program director of sister station WLDE was named program director for WAJI and operations manager for all three Fort Wayne Sarkes Tarzian radio stations. On September 4, 2015, 95.1 rebranded back to "Majic 95.1". The relaunch followed the departures of morning host Sid Kelly, producer James Raggi, and midday host Mandi Michaels.

On September 8, 2022, WAJI moved its CHR format and "The Twenty FM" branding from its HD2 subchannel to its HD3 subchannel.

== Awards and charitable activities ==
In 2002, Majic 95.1 began an annual 2-day telethon called the "Majic Riley Radiothon" to raise funds for Riley Hospital for Children in Indianapolis, Indiana. In 2006, this fundraising effort expanded to include local Fort Wayne recording facility Sweetwater Studios. The radio station and recording studio partnered to record live, acoustic music from nationally recognized artists and bands traveling through Fort Wayne. These recordings, along with others, have been used to produce an ongoing series of "Majic Miracle Music" charity CDs. 100% of proceeds from the sale of these CDs benefits Riley Hospital for Children. Artists who recorded at Sweetwater Studios for "Majic Miracle Music" CDs include REO Speedwagon, Ingrid Michaelson, Lenka, Aimee Allen, Jars of Clay, Rick Springfield, Ben Jelen, Josh Kelley, Sara Bareilles, Jon McLaughlin, Gin Blossoms, and Collective Soul.

In 2005, 2006 and again in 2007, WAJI won Radio and Records Hot AC station of the year for their community support and programming excellence.

In late 2010, WAJI midday host Barb Richards received the Bob Lind Supporter of the Year national award from the Children's Miracle Network for her active involvement in helping Riley Hospital for Children with the Majic Riley Radiothon, Majic Miracle Music releases, and involvement in other Riley Hospital-related activities.

In 2011, WAJI program director Dan Kennedy received the distinguished Edison 30 Under 30 Award for his programming achievements under the age of 30. He was also awarded the Copper Radio Award for his service to the communities of Arizona while programming a group of stations in that state. In 2015, WAJI program director Dan Kennedy was awarded the Fort Wayne 40 Under 40 award for service and excellence to the community.
