= Bob Tallman =

American rodeo announcer

- Born: Robert Matthew Tallman; October 25, 1947 (age 79); Orovada, Nevada, U.S.
- Occupations: Rodeo announcer Rancher
- Years active: 1970–present
- Spouse: Kristen Tallman
- Children: 1

Robert Matthew Tallman (born October 25, 1947) is an American professional rodeo announcer. He is known as "the voice of professional rodeo".

== Life ==
Bob Tallman was born Robert Matthew Tallman on October 25, 1947, in Orovada, Nevada, to rancher John B. Tallman and his wife Irene Capelli. Tallman and his sister, Maryanne, grew up on the family's Willow Creek cattle ranch, near Orovada. The Tallmans moved to Winnemucca when Bob was 10 years old. He tried football in high school, but it did not work out athletically. He had a natural talent for golf, but he loved rodeo more, and he could rope. He gained some experience roping in high school and in 4-H. He went to California Polytechnic State University in San Luis Obispo, California. He was there to rope, but he cared more about spending time with his friends. He did try to ride bucking horses, but was advised by the Canadian bull rider Bob Robinson, "find something else". He attended a rodeo in Fallon, Nevada, circa 1969 where he roped calves. He told the stock contractor that the announcer was "pitiful". The contractor told him to do it when he was done roping. Tallman did and was paid $100 a performance.

== Career ==
Tallman has announced more than 15,000 rodeo performances in the United States, Canada, Mexico, Australia and New Zealand. He has announced so many rodeos that his voice has become instantly recognizable to rodeo fans. Tallman has announced the National Finals Rodeo in Las Vegas, Nevada, more than any other announcer. He has announced the Houston Livestock Show and Rodeo for over 30 years. He is the spokesman for many cowboy-themed products. He refers to his voice as his "priceless gift from God" and tries to use it to touch peoples' lives.

In the 1990s, Bob Tallman co-hosted the ground-breaking reality outdoor show, Spur of the Moment, celebrating rodeo and the Western lifestyle. His co-host was champion barrel racer, Sharon Camarillo. The show was produced by Pat Turner, Stacy Ratliff (both from Jimmy Houston Productions), Adelman, and Dan Stewart. During the same decade, Tallman was a television color commentator for the now-defunct Bull Riders Only (BRO) circuit in the United States, as well as Cody Snyder's Bullbustin' events in Canada. In the 2000s, Tallman was a television color commentator during the first few years of the now-defunct Championship Bull Riding (CBR) circuit. For a time, he was also a member of the board of directors for that organization.

== Honors ==
- 12-time Professional Rodeo Cowboys Association (PRCA) Announcer of the Year
- 2004 ProRodeo Hall of Fame
- 2005 St. Paul Rodeo Hall of Fame
- 2006 Texas Cowboy Hall of Fame
- 2006 Miss Rodeo America Hall of Fame
- 2007 Rodeo Hall of Fame of the National Cowboy and Western Heritage Museum
- 2017 Bull Riding Hall of Fame
- 2017 National Multicultural Western Heritage Museum
- 2019 Reno Rodeo Hall of Fame
- 2019 Texas Rodeo Cowboy Hall of Fame
- 2020 ProRodeo Hall of Fame Legend of ProRodeo award
- 2024 RodeoHouston Hall of Fame
- 2024 Original Wrangler Bullfights Hall of Fame's Supporting Legend Award

== Personal life ==
Tallman and his wife Kristen reside in Poolville, Texas. They have a daughter. He raises Angus cows and calves on his ranch.
