= Rene Syler =

American journalist

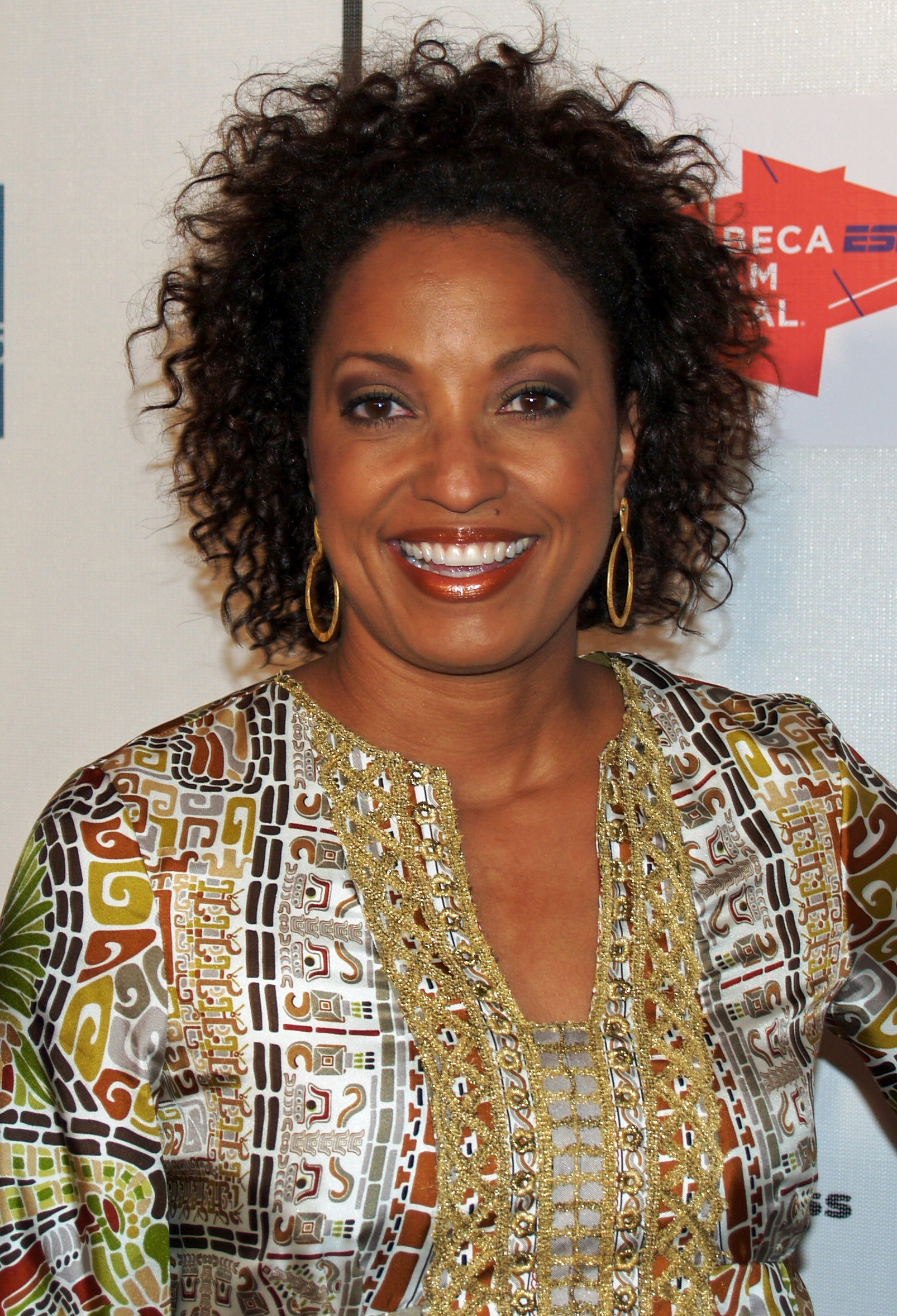
Rene Syler

René Syler (born February 17, 1963), is an American broadcast television journalist and author. Syler co-hosted CBS News' The Early Show from October 2002, when it debuted in its four-anchor format, until she left the program in December 2006. She has interviewed First Lady Laura Bush, former President Jimmy Carter, former Secretary of State Colin Powell, Senator John McCain, and NASA's first female shuttle commander, Eileen Collins, as well as celebrities including Melissa Etheridge and Prince.

== Background ==
Syler was born at Scott Air Force Base (Illinois) but grew up near Sacramento, California. She graduated from Del Campo High School in Fair Oaks, California, and CSU-Sacramento in 1987 with a degree in psychology.

== Career ==
Syler began her career in journalism as a weekend reporter at KTVN-TV in Reno, Nevada, from 1987 to 1989 when she left to become a weekend anchor at KOLO-TV. In 1990 she moved to Birmingham, Alabama, to become the weekend anchor at WVTM-TV. In 1992, she became the morning and noon anchor at WFAA-TV in Dallas, Texas. From 1997 to 2002, she anchored newscasts at KTVT, a CBS-owned station in Fort Worth. From 2002 to 2006, Syler was an anchor on CBS News' The Early Show along with Harry Smith, Hannah Storm and Julie Chen.

After leaving The Early Show in 2006, Syler remained busy, hosting a health-themed pilot for Fox and Telepicture's Mom Logic pilot. She was a guest expert on several episodes of Who Wants to Be a Millionaire and has made guest appearances on The View, The Nate Berkus Show, The Doctors, The Mo'Nique Show, The Wendy Williams Show, and CNN Headline News. She guest-hosted The Joy Behar Show in August 2010 on HLN.

Syler is an active member of the National Association of Black Journalists. She is a recipient of the 2004 Gracie Allen Award for Individual Achievement in the National Best Anchor category for her series on breast cancer. She was also honored by Ebony Magazine in 2005 as one of twelve Outstanding Women in Marketing and Communications. The American Women in Radio and Television awarded her Television Personality of the Year in 1997.

In early 2013, Syler became the host of Sweet Retreats on the Live Well Network. The series is designed to help travelers find perfect family vacation getaway locations. The series' first episode premiered on Sunday, January 20, 2013. Syler is now one of the hosts of Exhale on Aspire.

== Good Enough Mother ==
In 2007, Syler published her first book, Good Enough Mother, the Perfectly Imperfect Book Of Parenting (Simon & Schuster), and its companion website. Frustrated watching mothers buy into an unrealistic view of motherhood, Syler now uses her platform to empower women to do what works best for them and their families and eschew society's vision of perfect motherhood. She is currently busy building the Good Enough Mother brand, speaking to groups and conferences across America, and making media appearances to promote her parenting and life philosophy.

== Advocacy ==
Both Syler's mother and father had breast cancer, and on her final day on The Early Show, she announced that she herself was about to undergo a bilateral prophylactic mastectomy. Today, she is spokesperson for Susan G. Komen for the Cure, the largest grassroots breast cancer organization in the world, and works to spread the word about breast cancer and early detection. She is co-chair of the Komen Foundation's Circle of Promise and works to empower Black women to be more vocal about the subject of breast cancer.

== Personal life ==
Syler is a resident of Chappaqua in Westchester County.
