= Henry Wofford =

Henry Wofford is a sports anchor/reporter for NBC Sports and hosts Raiders Post Game Live, A’s Pregame Live, A’s Postgame Live, and Race Week.

== Early life ==
Wofford was born and raised in Stockton, California, and graduated from Edison High School, also located in Stockton.

== Career ==
Wofford worked as a reporter at WTHR (NBC) in Indianapolis, Indiana, from 2005 to 2010, as the sports director and anchor at WZZM (ABC) in Grand Rapids, Michigan, from 2003 to 2005, and as a sports anchor at KOLO (ABC) in Reno, NV, from 2000 to 2002.

Wofford also worked as an anchor and writer for KLIV in San Jose, California, and as a news director, anchor, and sports announcer for KSJS, San Jose State University's campus radio station. He does fill-in shifts for a 95.7 The Game in San Francisco.

He is a member of the National Association of Journalists, as well as the Radio-Television News Directors Association.

Beginning in August 2018, Wofford became public information officer for the Napa County Sheriff's Department.

== Awards ==
Wofford received first-place awards from the Society of Professional Journalists, in 2008, in Sports Reporting and In-Depth Reporting. He also received three awards from the Michigan Associated Press, in 2017, Best Sportscast and Best Reporter, for his feature, "13 On Your Sidelines".

== Education ==
He received his B.A. from University of California, Davis and his M.A. in journalism and mass communications from San Jose State University.
