= Sleeping Bear Dunes National Lakeshore Conservation and Recreation Act =

- Long title: To designate as wilderness certain land and inland water within the Sleeping Bear Dunes National Lakeshore in the State of Michigan, and for other purposes.
- Announced in: the 113th United States Congress
- Sponsored by: Sen. Carl Levin (D, MI)
- Number of co-sponsors: 1

Codification
- Acts affected: Wilderness Act
- U.S.C. sections affected: 16 U.S.C. § 1131 et seq., 16 U.S.C. § 460x–4
- Agencies affected: United States Department of Agriculture, National Park Service, United States Department of the Interior

Legislative history
- Introduced in the Senate as S. 23 by Sen. Carl Levin (D, MI) on January 22, 2013; Committee consideration by United States Senate Committee on Energy and Natural Resources, United States House Committee on Natural Resources, United States House Natural Resources Subcommittee on Public Lands and Environmental Regulation; Passed the Senate on June 19, 2013 (unanimous consent); Passed the House on March 4, 2014 (voice vote); Signed into law by President Barack Obama on March 13, 2014

The Sleeping Bear Dunes National Lakeshore Conservation and Recreation Act (S. 23) is a law that designated as wilderness about 32,500 acres of the Sleeping Bear Dunes National Lakeshore in the state of Michigan. The newly designated lands and inland waterways comprise the Sleeping Bear Dunes Wilderness, a new component of the National Wilderness Preservation System.

It was introduced into the United States Senate during the 113th United States Congress. On March 13, 2014, it was signed into law as Pub. L. 113–87 (text) (PDF) by President Barack Obama.

== Background ==
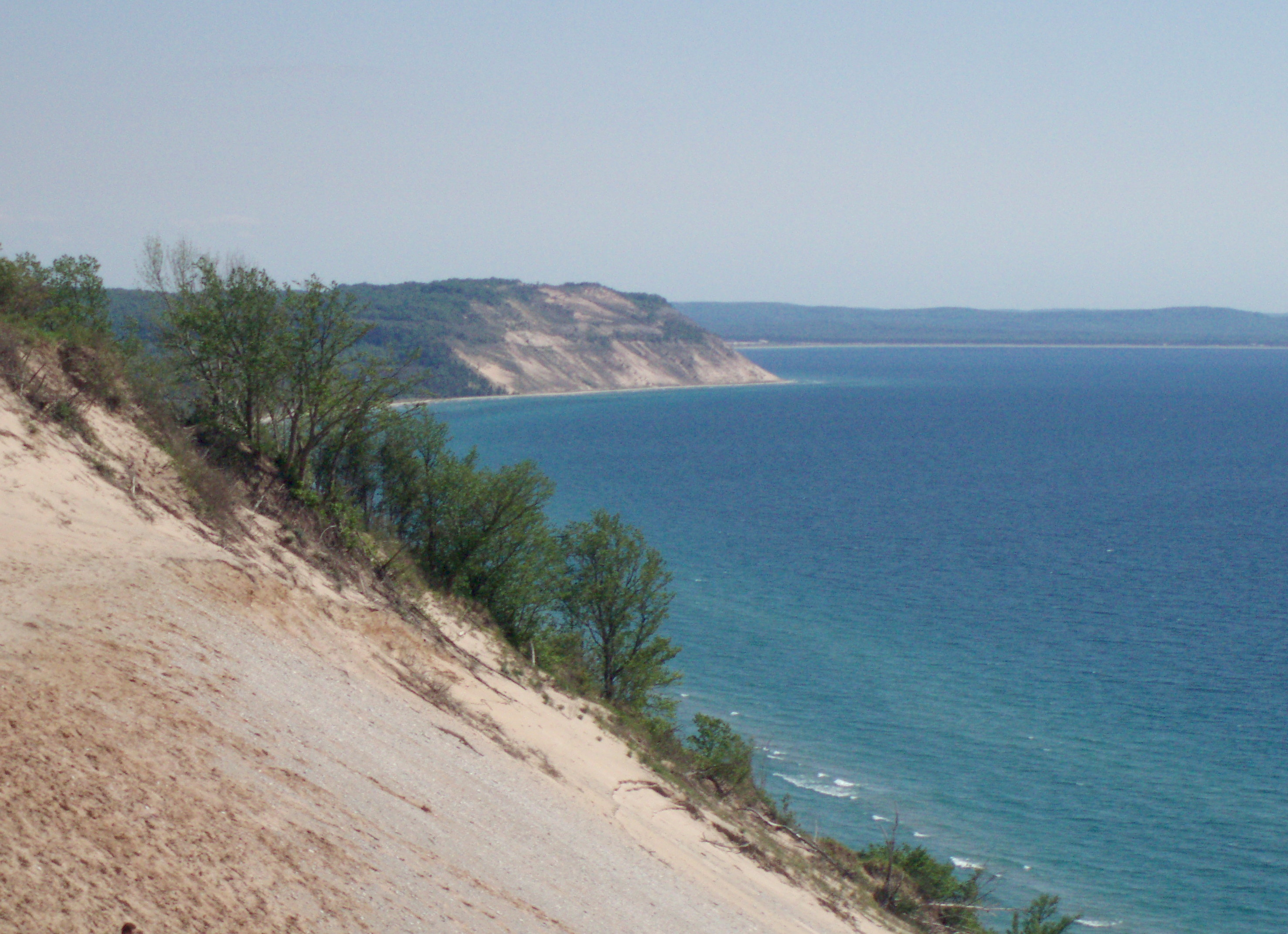
Looking south from Sleeping Bear Dunes toward Empire Bluffs and the southern portion of the National Lakeshore in Benzie County

The Sleeping Bear Dunes National Lakeshore is a United States National Lakeshore located along the northwest coast of the Lower Peninsula of Michigan in Leelanau County and Benzie County. The park covers a 35-mile (60-km) stretch of Lake Michigan's eastern coastline, as well as North and South Manitou Islands. This northern Michigan park was established primarily because of its outstanding natural features, including forests, beaches, dune formations, and ancient glacial phenomena. The Lakeshore also contains many cultural features including the 1871 South Manitou Island Lighthouse, three former Life-Saving Service/Coast Guard Stations and an extensive rural historic farm district. In 2011 the area won the title of "The Most Beautiful Place in America" from Good Morning America.

== Provisions of the bill ==
This summary is based largely on the summary provided by the Congressional Research Service, a public domain source.

The Sleeping Bear Dunes National Lakeshore Conservation and Recreation Act would designate specified land and inland water within the Sleeping Bear Dunes National Lakeshore in Michigan, to be known as the Sleeping Bear Dunes Wilderness, as wilderness and as a component of the National Wilderness Preservation System.

The bill would require the boundary of the Wilderness to be: (1) 100 feet from the centerline of adjacent county roads, and (2) 300 feet from the centerline of adjacent state highways.

The bill would specify this Act's effect on: (1) the maintenance and improvement of roads located outside the boundary of the Wilderness; (2) Michigan's jurisdiction with respect to the management of fish and wildlife, including hunting and fishing, within the National Lakeshore; and (3) any treaty rights or any existing valid private property rights.

== Congressional Budget Office report ==
This summary is based largely on the summary provided by the Congressional Budget Office, as ordered reported by the Senate Committee on Energy and Natural Resources on March 14, 2013. This is a public domain source.

S. 23 would designate as wilderness about 32,500 acres of the Sleeping Bear Dunes National Lakeshore in the state of Michigan. The newly designated lands and inland waterways would comprise the Sleeping Bear Dunes Wilderness, a new component of the National Wilderness Preservation System.

Based on information from the United States National Park Service, the Congressional Budget Office (CBO) estimates that the bill would have no significant impact on the federal budget. More than 30,000 of the affected acres have been managed as wilderness since 1981, and CBO estimates that the potential impact of the designation on public use would be minor. Enacting S. 23 would not affect direct spending or revenues; therefore, pay-as-you-go procedures do not apply.

S. 23 contains no intergovernmental or private-sector mandates as defined in the Unfunded Mandates Reform Act and would impose no costs on state, local, or tribal governments.

== Procedural history ==
The Sleeping Bear Dunes National Lakeshore Conservation and Recreation Act was introduced into the United States Senate on January 22, 2013, by Sen. Carl Levin (D, MI). It was referred to the United States Senate Committee on Energy and Natural Resources. It was reported by the committee alongside Senate Report 113-14. On June 19, 2013, it passed the Senate by unanimous consent. It was received in the United States House of Representatives on June 20, 2013, and referred to the United States House Committee on Natural Resources and the United States House Natural Resources Subcommittee on Public Lands and Environmental Regulation. On February 29, 2014, House Majority Leader Eric Cantor announced that S. 23 would be considered under a suspension of the rules on March 3, 2014. Consideration was delayed until March 4, 2014, due to a snowstorm in Washington D.C. The House voted on March 3, 2014, to pass the bill by a voice vote. On March 13, 2014, it was signed into law as Pub. L. 113–87 (text) (PDF) by President Barack Obama.

== Debate and discussion ==
The Wilderness Society called the dunes "a slice of tranquility along the coast of Lake Michigan" that "is known for the gorgeous sunsets over towering dunes."

Representative Dan Benishek, who supported the bill, expressed his pleasure that the bill "was developed locally," describing it as "the ideal way federal land management should occur, with input from the local communities." The bill was supported locally by the group Citizens for Access to the Lakeshore. The president of that organization, Jeannette Feeheley, said that the bill would take care of "the problems we had tried to resolve back in 2002."

However, some opponents objected to the length of the Sleeping Bear Heritage Trail and to the locations that it would stop at.

== See also ==
- List of bills in the 113th United States Congress
