= Dennis Terry =

- Born: Dennis Dan Teresi; August 14, 1954 (age 70)
- Occupation: Disc jockey

Dennis Dan "Denny" Teresi (born August 14, 1954), now known as Dennis Terry, is an American radio disc jockey and former phone phreak most famous for being the person who introduced John Draper to the field of phreaking. Both Draper and Teresi were operating pirate radio stations in the San Jose, California area. Their initial contact came when Teresi responded by telephone to one of Draper's pirate broadcasts.

In the documentary The Secret History of Hacking, Teresi is identified as an expert in social engineering. Teresi's mastery of the phone company's jargon allowed him to speak with phone company employees and trick them into revealing more information.

Teresi, who is blind, has hosted an oldies radio show on KSJS since 1976 under the name "Dennis Terry", and for several years he also operated an oldies record store in San Jose.

He was elected into the Bay Area Radio Hall of Fame as a member of its Class of 2021.
