= WTTS =

- Trafalgar, Indiana; United States
- Broadcast area: Bloomington, Indiana; Indianapolis
- Frequency: 92.3 MHz (HD Radio)
- Branding: 92.3 WTTS

Programming
- Format: Adult album alternative
- Subchannels: HD2: Mainstream rock "Rock 96.1 The Quarry"

Ownership
- Owner: Sarkes Tarzian, Inc.
- Sister stations: WWZN

History
- First air date: 1960
- Former call signs: WTTV-FM (1960–1975); WGTC (1975–1984)

Technical information
- Licensing authority: FCC
- Facility ID: 59141
- Class: B (superpower)
- ERP: 37,000 watts
- HAAT: 332 meters (1,089 ft)
- Transmitter coordinates: 39°24′27.2″N 86°8′52″W
- Translator: HD2: 96.1 W241CD (Bloomington)

Links
- Public license information: Public file; LMS
- Webcast: Listen live Listen live (HD2)
- Website: wttsfm.com rock961fm.com (HD2)

WTTS is an FM radio station serving Indianapolis and Bloomington, Indiana, in the United States, licensed to Trafalgar, Indiana, and broadcasting at 92.3 FM. The station's format is classified as adult album alternative or "triple A". WTTS uses the slogan "World Class Rock" to describe its music mix. The station plays a variety of rock-based music from the mid-1960s to the present, including acoustic, reggae, classic rock, blues and alternative rock. In 2001, WTTS was among the first American radio stations to play music by the artists John Mayer and Norah Jones, both of whom went on to become Grammy Award winners. The station maintains studios in both downtown Indianapolis and Bloomington, its former city of license. WTTS' main transmitter is located in Trafalgar.

WTTS and its sister station, WWZN (1370 AM), have been locally owned since their inceptions by Sarkes Tarzian, Inc.

== History ==
WTTS began broadcasting a big band format in 1960 as WTTV-FM, sharing call letters with then-sister television station WTTV (channel 4). In the mid-1970s, the call letters were changed to WGTC-FM, which stood for "Good Time Country" to reflect its new country music format. In 1984, WGTC-FM became WTTS (the former callsign of its AM sister station), and in 1988, it changed to a hybrid of album oriented rock and CHR as "Power 92". Four years later, in 1992, WTTS adopted an adult album alternative format.

WTTS has been named "Best Local Radio Station" by Indianapolis alternative newspaper Nuvo multiple times since 1998. It has also been nominated for "Adult Rock Station of the Year" honors numerous times by Radio & Records and FMQB magazines, prominent radio and music industry trade publications.

The station broadcasts from the 1,000-foot (300 m) WTTV television tower, located in Trafalgar.

== On-air staff and programming ==
WTTS current program hosts include Matt Pelsor, mornings; Pete Kilmer, middays; Crystal McKenzie, afternoon drive.

In 2004, WTTS introduced the Phil the Listener Show, hosted by longtime listener Phil Stoerck. The show featured an eclectic mix of rock that aired monthly. Phil died at the age of 54 on March 9, 2008.

Specialty programs on WTTS include OverEasy, Sunday mornings and nights (laid-back "World Class Rock"); Etown and The Beat with Dave Lindquist, Monday nights at 7p, featuring brand new music from national and local artists.

== Music-related promotions ==
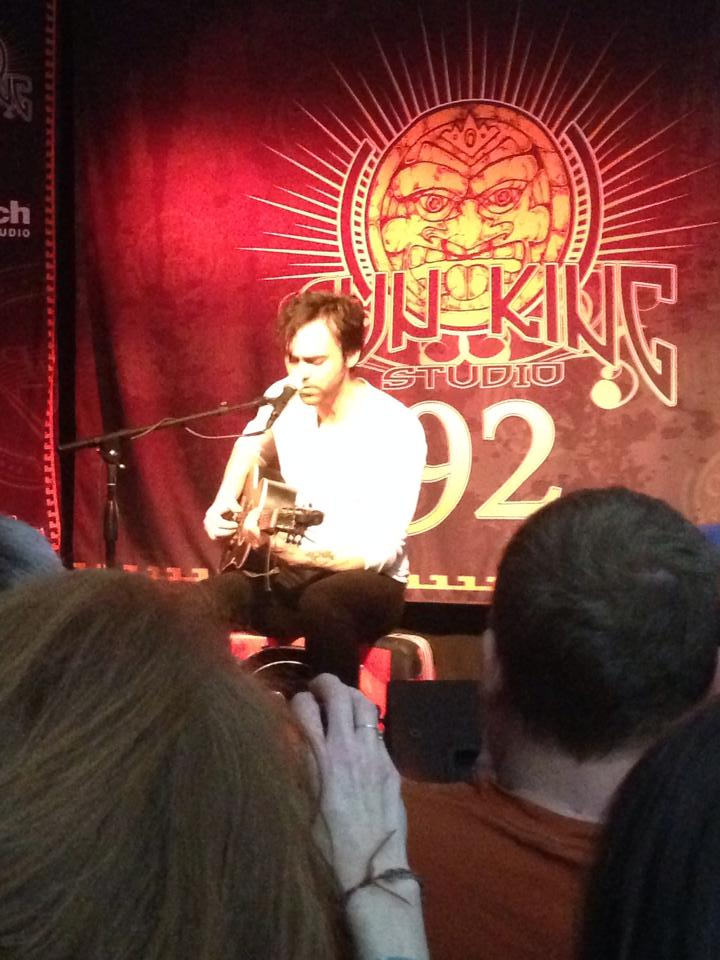
Shakey Graves performing in Sun King Studio 92 in 2015

WTTS sponsors various promotions focused on the station's triple-A format, staging performances and producing CDs of live recordings featuring established and emerging artists from the genres it plays. For the past eight years, the station has hosted a series of "Private Concerts" and "Emerging Artist Concerts" that have headlined performances by artists such as KT Tunstall, John Mayer, Buddy Guy, Big Head Todd & The Monsters, Bob Schneider, Sonia Dada, Five for Fighting and others. In 2005, the station opened Sun King Studio 92, a performance and recording venue in downtown Indianapolis. Artists who have played in Studio 92 include Marc Broussard, David Gray, Los Lonely Boys, Goo Goo Dolls, Widespread Panic, Jet, John Butler Trio, Umphrey's McGee, The Doobie Brothers, Snow Patrol and Amos Lee, among others.

On July 15, 2007, WTTS celebrated the 15th anniversary of its format with the "WTTS 15th Birthday Bash Starring Bob Dylan". The sold-out concert was held at the Lawn at White River State Park in downtown Indianapolis. In 2008, WTTS, in conjunction with A&E Television, presented an exclusive private concert with John Mellencamp. The event, attended by 400 listeners, was later featured in an A&E Biography special.

The summer of 2012 marked the 20th anniversary of the triple-A format on WTTS. The station commemorated the occasion with "The WTTS 20th Anniversary Concert", featuring four bands first played on the station 20 years prior: Barenaked Ladies, Blues Traveler, Big Head Todd & The Monsters and Cracker.

WTTS has also hosted annual holiday concerts including Toys For Tots Christmas Concerts and the Rock To Read Benefits for the Indianapolis Public Library. Artists involved in Toys For Tots Christmas Concerts have included: Better Than Ezra, Los Lonely Boys, Jennie DeVoe, Low Millions, Aqualung, Spin Doctors, The Subdudes, Eric Lindell, Sonia Dada, John Mayer, Joe Bonamassa, VHS Or Beta, Amos Lee, Delta Spirit, The Gabe Dixon Band, Brett Dennen, Eric Hutchinson, Guster, Fitz and the Tantrums, Scars on 45, Band Of Horses and Mat Kearney.

Artists involved in Rock To Read Benefits include: Los Lonely Boys, The Damnwells, The Kooks, Susan Tedeschi, James Hunter, Collective Soul, Chris Isaak, John Hiatt and Big Head Todd & The Monsters.

== Digital media ==
WTTS offers a live stream through its website. The site also features an extensive "Playlist Center" offering in-depth playlists spanning the past thirty days. In 2011, WTTS introduced a live streaming app for the iPhone and Android devices. In addition, the station maintains a "92-3 VIP" database, enabling listeners to register for access to promotions not offered on-air. WTTS is also actively involved in Facebook, Twitter and YouTube campaigns.

== HD Radio ==
On September 8, 2019, WTTS launched a mainstream rock format on its HD2 subchannel, branded as "Rock 96.1 The Quarry" (simulcast on translator W241CD 96.1 FM Bloomington).
