= WRCB =

Television station in Chattanooga, Tennessee

- Chattanooga, Tennessee; United States
- Channels: Digital: 13 (VHF); Virtual: 3
- Branding: Local 3

Programming
- Affiliations: 3.1: NBC; for others, see § Subchannels

Ownership
- Owner: Sarkes Tarzian, Inc.

History
- First air date: May 6, 1956
- Former call signs: WRGP-TV (1956–1962)
- Former channel numbers: Analog: 3 (VHF, 1956–2009)
- Call sign meaning: Rust Craft Broadcasting (former owner)

Technical information
- Licensing authority: FCC
- Facility ID: 59137
- ERP: 160 kW
- HAAT: 363.5 m (1,193 ft)
- Transmitter coordinates: 35°9′40.2″N 85°18′50.8″W

Links
- Public license information: Public file; LMS
- Website: www.local3news.com

WRCB (channel 3), branded as Local 3, is a television station in Chattanooga, Tennessee, United States, affiliated with NBC and owned by Sarkes Tarzian, Inc. The station's studios are located on Whitehall Road on Chattanooga's north side; its transmitter is located in the town of Walden on Signal Mountain.

WRCB began broadcasting on May 6, 1956, as WRGP-TV, the second TV station in Chattanooga. Originally owned by Ramon G. Patterson, it was an NBC affiliate from its launch. The Friendly Group purchased the station in 1959 and, as part of its renaming as Rust Craft Broadcasting, changed the call sign to WRCB on January 1, 1963. Under Rust Craft and Ziff-Davis, which acquired the Rust Craft group in 1979, the station remained in third place in local news ratings.

Sarkes Tarzian acquired WRCB in 1982. The station's news ratings saw a marked increase in the 1980s, propelled at first by the popularity of the syndicated game show Wheel of Fortune. For most of the time since the mid-1980s, WRCB and WTVC (channel 9) have competed for first place in local news viewership in Chattanooga.

== History ==
When the Federal Communications Commission (FCC) lifted its multi-year freeze on new television station applications in April 1952, Chattanooga was assigned two VHF television channels, 3 and 12, and several Chattanooga interests began considering filing for them. Two applicants sought channel 3: Chattanooga radio station WDOD and Mountain City Television, a company owned by R. G. Patterson and Will Cummings, a former county judge. Patterson was the owner of station WAPO.

The two firms became involved in a multi-year battle for the construction permit, as a comparative hearing was necessary. In May 1954, FCC hearing examiner J. D. Bond ruled in favor of Mountain City because its program proposals were superior. WDOD contested because it believed that Patterson's work for the TV station would conflict with his activities at WAPO radio. On an appeal to the full commission, the FCC voted 4–2 in favor of Mountain City's application on February 9, 1956, citing the "clear superiority" of WAPO's past broadcast record over WDOD. The news assured Chattanooga of a second television station in short order and set off a shuffle of network affiliations. Chattanooga's existing station, WDEF-TV (channel 12), elected to become a primary affiliate of CBS. This left the new WRGP-TV to take NBC. The station reused the former transmitter facility of WAPO-FM on Signal Mountain. WRGP-TV made its first broadcast on May 6, 1956, from studios at 1214 McCallie Avenue. In addition to NBC programs, some ABC programs aired on the new station, though Chattanooga gained a primary ABC affiliate in 1958 with the startup of WTVC (channel 9), which moved in from Rome, Georgia. In 1958, Jim Nabors—later known for playing Gomer Pyle—made his on-air television debut as a substitute performer on a WRGP-TV show.

The Pattersons sold WRGP-TV to WSTV, Inc., the Friendly Group of Steubenville, Ohio, in a deal announced in October 1959 and completed in January 1960. The Friendly Group was acquired by Massachusetts-based United Printers and Publishers in 1961, giving the firm five TV stations and radio outlets from Florida to West Virginia. United changed its name to Rust Craft Greeting Card Company in 1962, adopting the name of its most-known products. WSTV, Inc. became Rust Craft Broadcasting. To identify the station with the new ownership name, WRGP-TV became WRCB on January 1, 1963. WRCB, outgrowing its original studios, moved to a new studio facility on Whitehall Road in the Stringers Ridge area in 1968. The new building was equipped for local color broadcasting.

In June 1977, the Ziff Corporation, parent of magazine publisher Ziff-Davis, made a bid for Rust Craft, primarily seeking its six television stations. Ziff-Davis had previously hired I. Martin Pompadur, a former ABC executive, as part of the company's plan to acquire television stations. The Rust Craft board approved the sale that September for a total price of approximately $69 million, but booming prices for broadcast properties and an objection by two Rust Craft directors and shareholders, seeking more money, caused the deal to be delayed and its price to continue to balloon. The original bid had been $25 a share; the board approved at $26.50 a share. By October 1978, Ziff was offering $33.50 per share. The final sales price of $33.75 a share, or $89 million in total, was approved in February 1979; the transaction already had federal approval, so the new owners were able to take over the next month. The new ownership invested in new equipment but on its own could not solve the station's reputation for high turnover.

=== Sarkes Tarzian ownership ===
Ziff decided in 1981 to put the stations on the market, having already sold off the Rust Craft radio stations and its greeting card businesses, and focus on its publishing businesses. The company sold WRCB to Sarkes Tarzian, Inc., an Indiana-based radio and TV station owner, in February 1982. The sale was held up over a petition by the NAACP and the National Black Media Coalition, which believed that WRCB had underemployed Black people in 1980 and 1981; the deal proceeded after a settlement with Ziff-Davis.

Sarkes took on a station that was third in news behind a newly resurgent WTVC and WDEF, which had previously led in the market. WRCB's ratings fortunes began to change in May 1984, after the station acquired rights to the syndicated game show Wheel of Fortune. Its popularity lifted the 6 p.m. news ratings for WRCB and the NBC Nightly News. By July 1985, WRCB's early evening news had moved into second place, behind WTVC but ahead of WDEF. The late evening news lagged the change in early evenings, and WTVC was more dominant at 11 p.m. for a time. In 1987, WRCB debuted a 5:30 p.m. half-hour newscast, Live at 5:30.

By 1989, WRCB and WTVC were in close competition for first-place positioning in news and total-day ratings, with WDEF in third. For most of the time since the early 1990s, WRCB has been in close competition with WTVC for first place in news ratings and the market lead in revenue, though WTVC has tended to edge WRCB.

In 2014, WRCB added weekend morning newscasts, followed by a 4 p.m. evening newscast in 2018. On January 15, 2022, the station rebranded as Local 3.

== Notable former on-air staff ==
- Doreen Gentzler – reporter, 1979–1980

== Technical information ==
=== Subchannels ===
WRCB's transmitter is located in the town of Walden on Signal Mountain. The station's signal is multiplexed:

Subchannels of WRCB
| Subchannel | Res. | Short name | Programming |
|---|---|---|---|
| 3.1 | 1080i | WRCB-HD | NBC |
| 3.2 | 480i | Dabl | Dabl |
| 3.3 | 480i | ION | Ion |
| 3.4 | 480i | IonPlus | Ion Plus |
| 3.5 | 480i | Grit TV | Grit |

WRCB began broadcasting a digital signal on May 1, 2002. It ceased regular programming on its analog signal on June 12, 2009, the national digital television transition date, with a limited analog nightlight service of transition information which broadcast after that date under the SAFER Act. The station's digital signal remained on its pre-transition VHF channel 13, using virtual channel 3.
