= KXEQ =

Radio station in Reno, Nevada

- Reno, Nevada; United States
- Broadcast area: Reno metropolitan area
- Frequency: 1340 kHz
- Branding: La Super Q

Programming
- Format: Regional Mexican

Ownership
- Owner: Azteca Broadcasting Corporation

History
- First air date: July 9, 1946
- Last air date: September 2024
- Former call signs: KATO (1946–1959); KBET (1959–1987); KRCV (1987–1991)

Technical information
- Facility ID: 57445
- Class: C
- Power: 977 watts
- Transmitter coordinates: 39°31′4.7″N 119°44′32.7″W

KXEQ (1340 AM) was a radio station in Reno, Nevada, United States, which operated from 1946 to 2024. It last broadcast a Regional Mexican format to the Reno metropolitan area and was owned by Azteca Broadcasting Corporation. It was built as KATO, Reno's second radio station, and was owned for 22 years by Robert Stoddard and broadcast a country music format through 1984 under the call signs KATO and KBET. From 1987 to 1991, it was KRCV, a Christian station, and for its final three decades, it broadcast in Spanish.

== History ==
=== KATO ===
Reno got its second radio station when KATO signed on for the first time on July 9, 1946. Owned by the Sierra Broadcasting Company, KATO was a Don Lee/Mutual affiliate and broadcast with 250 watts from a transmitter at Sixth and Cassinella streets on the eastern edge of town. Robert Stoddard, the station's founding general manager, bought out Sierra Broadcasting in 1953 for $47,600.

KATO was approved in 1958 to relocate its transmitter to a site east of town.

=== KBET ===
On May 28, 1959, KATO became KBET. Later that year, tragedy struck when 43-year-old newscaster and account executive Ernie Ferguson committed suicide on Thanksgiving. Stoddard's Comstock Telecasting Corporation made an application for television channel 4 in Reno in 1960; while it was not selected, KBET did increase its power to 1,000 watts in 1961. It broadcast from studios at the Mapes Hotel downtown after having gone on the air from the basement of an Elks lodge.

KBET was fined $5,000 by the Federal Communications Commission (FCC) in 1971 for fraudulent billing practices that allowed an appliance distributor to double-bill its suppliers.

Stoddard died in July 1975 of a heart attack while golfing in northern California; he was remembered for his folksy local newscasts and involvement in local high school sports. The First National Bank of Nevada took control of the KBET license and sold the country music outlet to the highest bidder the next year: Sierra Broadcasting, owned by Bob and Julie Day and Royce Adams.

After an attempt to sell the license to Sterling Broadcasting in 1980 fell through, KBET was sold the next year to Reno Electronics, owned by former KOLO radio-TV general manager Stan Weisberger; the new ownership retained KBET's country format but sought to relocate the studios and acquire new equipment. However, by 1984, the station had flipped to oldies, perhaps because Reno had five country stations, and the next year it went in a middle-of-the-road direction and branded as "KBEST".

=== KRCV ===
KBET and its Las Vegas sister, KNUU, were sold to Doug and Christina Trenner's CAT Broadcasting for $2.1 million in 1986. A major format change followed: in May 1987, the station became KRCV, "Reno's Christian Voice"—the city's only Christian radio station. Although KRCV did not make money, a coalition of 75 business leaders, pastors and station listeners mounted an effort to buy the station outright the next year, with Trenner's blessing. In addition to its religious programming, KRCV presented Reno Silver Sox baseball and high school football broadcasts.

=== KXEQ ===
However, by 1991, KRCV was silent and CAT Broadcasting had filed for bankruptcy. As a debtor-in-possession, it sold KRCV to Rolando Collantes, owner of KSVN in Ogden, Utah, and KGEN in Tulare, California, for $30,000 in 1991. KXEQ debuted on 1340 AM on December 14, 1991, as "La Super Q", with studios in a converted house on Linden Street.

In 2014, KXEQ began broadcasting the Alex "El Genio" Lucas syndicated morning show.

KXEQ left the air in September 2024. As it never disclosed a resumption of operations or provided any other response to an FCC inquiry, the license was cancelled on April 16, 2026.
