= KIHM =

Relevant Radio station in Reno, Nevada

- Reno, Nevada; United States
- Frequency: 920 kHz
- Branding: Relevant Radio

Programming
- Format: Catholic radio
- Network: Relevant Radio

Ownership
- Owner: Relevant Radio, Inc.

History
- First air date: August 10, 1946
- Former call signs: KOLO (1946–1987); KQLO (1987–1999)
- Call sign meaning: Immaculate Heart of Mary

Technical information
- Licensing authority: FCC
- Facility ID: 53707
- Class: B
- Power: 4,800 watts (day); 850 watts (night)
- Transmitter coordinates: 39°30′49.7″N 119°42′55.7″W
- Translator: 93.3 K227AW (Truckee, CA)

Links
- Public license information: Public file; LMS
- Webcast: Listen live
- Website: relevantradio.com

KIHM (920 AM) is a radio station broadcasting a Catholic radio format. Licensed to Reno, Nevada, United States, it serves the Reno area. The station is owned by Relevant Radio.

== History ==
=== KOLO ===
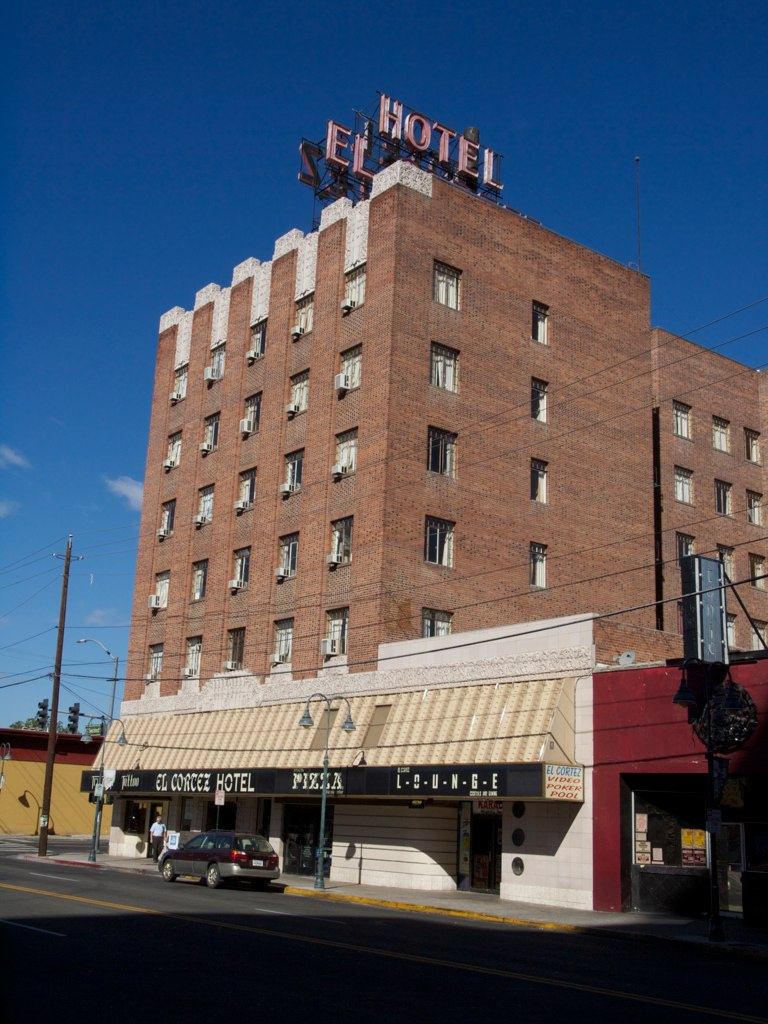
The El Cortez Hotel housed KOLO radio from 1956 to 1971

On September 25, 1944, the Reno Broadcasting Company filed an application with the Federal Communications Commission (FCC) for a new radio station to broadcast on 920 kHz in Reno with 1,000 watts. The FCC approved its application, and that of Sierra Broadcasting Company for 1340 kHz, on March 7, 1946. Taking an affiliation with CBS and the call letters KOLO, the station signed on the air August 10, 1946 as the third in town. The same interests involved in starting KOLO, Hi Wells and David McKay, would also build Las Vegas station KORK in 1950.

In 1955, Wells and McKay sold their Nevada broadcasting holdings to Donald W. Reynolds, who owned the Las Vegas Review-Journal and television stations in Las Vegas (KLRJ-TV, renamed KORK-TV) and Reno (KZTV channel 8, which became KOLO-TV in 1956). The next year, KOLO radio moved from its original location on Sierra Street to the El Cortez Hotel. In 1963, after a three-year wait, the FCC authorized KOLO to increase its daytime power to 5,000 watts.

After KOLO television was forced to rebuild after a 1977 fire, a new building next to it was constructed in 1981 to provide space for KOLO radio and Donrey's outdoor advertising business. At the time, the station aired an adult contemporary format, switching to country music in April 1983.

=== KQLO ===
In 1987, Donrey sold KOLO radio after 32 consecutive years of ownership to Constant Communications of Nevada, owners of KWNZ (97.3 FM). The call letters were changed to KQLO later that year, though the station initially retained its country music format. The next year, Constant switched KQLO to news/talk. In 1989, Constant sold its radio stations to a subsidiary of Pacific Telecom of Vancouver, Washington. Citing low ratings, Pacific wasted little time making its own format shift, flipping the station to oldies in January 1990. The station used the Kool Gold syndicated format; when this was discontinued by the Satellite Music Network on December 31, 1994, KQLO switched to simulcasting KWNZ.

The end of Kool Gold heralded the sale of the station. In 1995, KQLO was acquired by Universal Broadcasting for $325,000 and began broadcasting Spanish-language programming as "Radio Universal".

=== Catholic radio ===
In 1999, Universal sold KQLO to Thomas Aquinas School of Tahoe City, California. In 1997, after Doug Sherman drove from Reno to Vermont without hearing a single Catholic radio station, the school had bought 1590 AM and relaunched it as Catholic radio outlet KIHM, which then switched frequencies with KQLO to put KQLO on 1590 and KIHM on the stronger 920 signal. Universal leased the 1590 frequency from Aquinas with the option to buy. It was the first station in the Immaculate Heart Media network, which by the time of its 2017 merger with Relevant Radio had grown to 23 stations in the western United States.
