= WWZN =

Radio station in Bloomington, Indiana

- Bloomington, Indiana; United States
- Broadcast area: Monroe County
- Frequency: 1370 kHz
- Branding: 98.7 The Zone

Programming
- Format: Sports
- Affiliations: Westwood One Sports

Ownership
- Owner: Sarkes Tarzian, Inc.
- Sister stations: WTTS

History
- First air date: March 11, 1949
- Former call signs: WTTS (1949–1984); WGTC (1984–1988); WGCL (1988–2025)
- Call sign meaning: "Zone"

Technical information
- Licensing authority: FCC
- Facility ID: 59131
- Class: B
- Power: 5,000 watts (day); 500 watts (night)
- Transmitter coordinates: 39°11′25″N 86°38′2″W
- Translator: 98.7 W254DP (Bloomington)

Links
- Public license information: Public file; LMS
- Webcast: Listen live
- Website: www.wgclradio.com

WWZN (1370 AM) is a commercial radio station licensed to Bloomington, Indiana, United States, serving Monroe County. The station is owned by Sarkes Tarzian, Inc. and features a sports radio format with programming from Westwood One Sports in the evening. The studios and offices are on West 7th Street in Bloomington.

By day, WWZN is powered at 5,000 watts. To avoid interference to other stations on 1370 AM, at night it reduces power to 500 watts. It uses a directional antenna at all times. Programming is also heard on 250 watt FM translator W254DP at 98.7 MHz.

== History ==
On March 11, 1949, the station first signed on the air. It has always been owned by Sarkes Tarzian, Inc. The station's original call sign was WTTS, powered at 1,000 watts by day, 500 watts at night. It was Bloomington's third AM radio station, the others being WSUA 1010 (1946–50) and WTOM 1490 (1947–51). From the 1950s until 1984, WTTS was a full-service, middle of the road (MOR) station, playing popular adult music, news and sports. It was a network affiliate of ABC Radio prior to that network's 1967 split, and the ABC Entertainment Network after that.

In November 1949, Sarkes Tarzian put television station WTTV (channel 4) on the air. Tarzian owned it until 1978. In 1960, sister station WTTV-FM 92.3 went on the air, simulcasting WTTS until 1967, when it switched to a separate format.

WTTS changed its call letters to WGTC on July 9, 1984, flipping to a full-service, country music format. On November 17, 1988, the station changed its call sign to WGCL. It ended music programming, moving to a talk radio format.

On December 29, 2025, WGCL changed its format from talk to sports, branded as "98.7 The Zone" under new WWZN call letters.

== FM translator ==
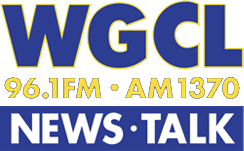
Logo while simulcast on 96.1 FM

WGCL added an FM translator, originally at 96.1 MHz, W241CD. It later switched its translator simulcast to 98.7 MHz, W254DP.

Broadcast translator for WWZN
Call sign	Frequency	City of license	FID	ERP (W)	HAAT	Class	Transmitter coordinates	FCC info
W254DP	98.7 FM	Bloomington, Indiana	202440	250	118 m (387 ft)	D	39°9′11.2″N 86°31′1″W	LMS
