= Orovada, Nevada =

- Census-designated place
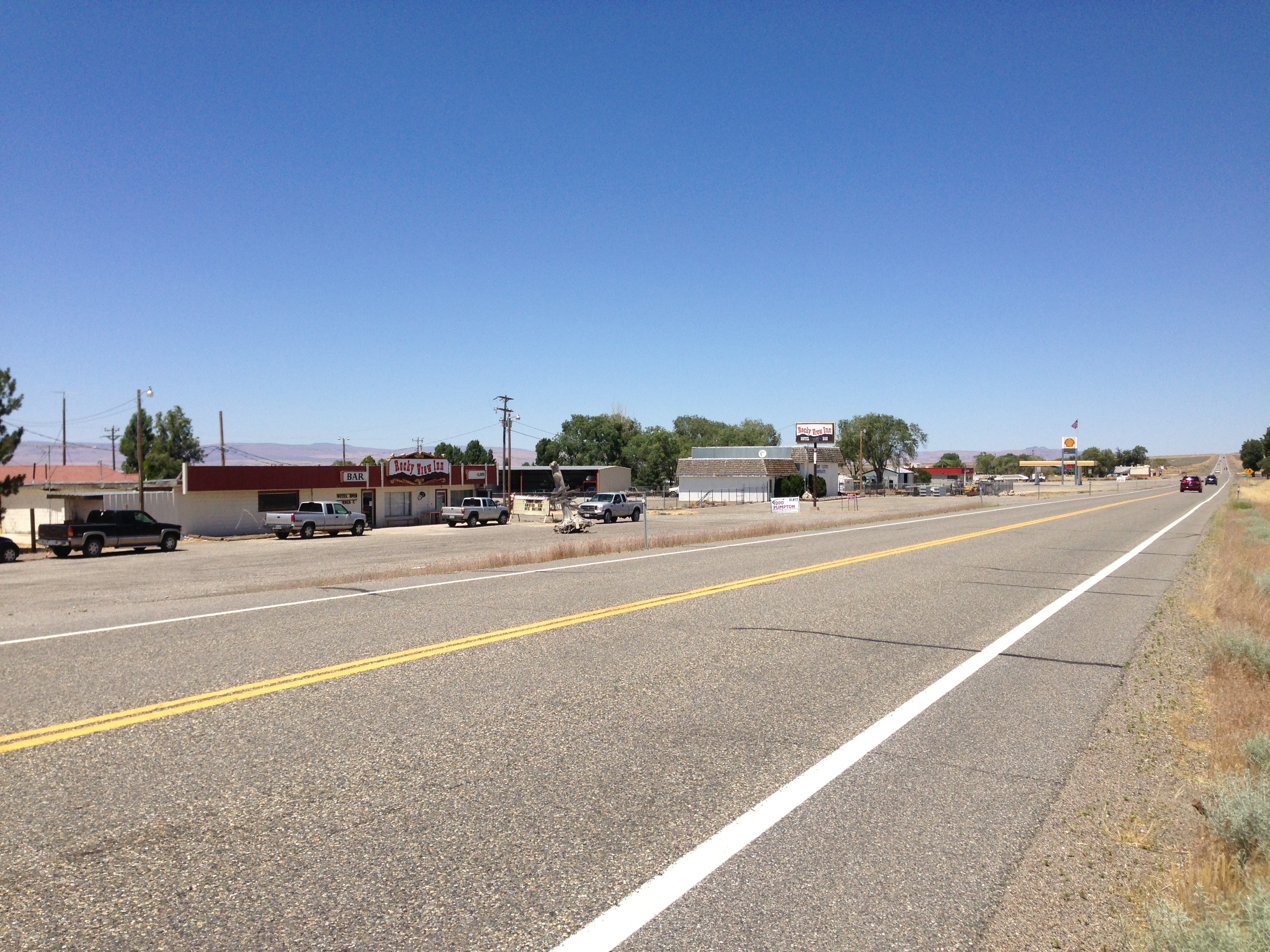

- Location within the state of Nevada
- Coordinates: 41°34′12″N 117°47′2″W
- Country: United States
- State: Nevada
- County: Humboldt

Area
  - Total: 22.18 sq mi (57.44 km^{2})
  - Land: 22.18 sq mi (57.44 km^{2})
  - Water: 0 sq mi (0.00 km^{2})
- Elevation: 4,236 ft (1,291 m)

Population (2020)
  - Total: 117
  - Density: 5.3/sq mi (2.04/km^{2})
- Time zone: UTC-8 (Pacific (PST))
  - Summer (DST): UTC-7 (PDT)
- ZIP code: 89425
- FIPS code: 32-53000
- GNIS feature ID: 2583947

Orovada is a census-designated place in Humboldt County, Nevada. As of the 2020 census, Orovada had a population of 117.

== History ==
The first permanent settlement at Orovada was made in 1918. The name is a combination of oro (Spanish "gold") and Nevada. A post office has been in operation at Orovada since 1920.

== Geography ==
According to the United States Census Bureau, the Orovada CDP has an area of 45.3 square miles (117.3 km^{2}), all land. U.S. Route 95 runs through the CDP, leading south 43 miles (69 km) to Winnemucca and north 30 miles (48 km) to the Oregon state line at McDermitt.

== Climate ==
According to the Köppen Climate Classification system, Orovada has a cold semi-arid climate, abbreviated "BSk" on climate maps. The hottest temperature recorded in Orovada was 115 °F (46.1 °C) on September 1–2, 1947, while the coldest temperature recorded was −35 °F (−37.2 °C) on December 19, 1924 and December 26, 1924.

Climate data for Orovada, Nevada, 1991–2020 normals, extremes 1911–present
Month	Jan	Feb	Mar	Apr	May	Jun	Jul	Aug	Sep	Oct	Nov	Dec	Year
Record high °F (°C)	67 (19)	71 (22)	85 (29)	92 (33)	105 (41)	107 (42)	109 (43)	108 (42)	105 (41)	94 (34)	80 (27)	68 (20)	109 (43)
Mean maximum °F (°C)	54.0 (12.2)	61.1 (16.2)	71.2 (21.8)	79.7 (26.5)	89.2 (31.8)	96.8 (36.0)	102.3 (39.1)	101.0 (38.3)	94.8 (34.9)	82.4 (28.0)	68.3 (20.2)	56.0 (13.3)	103.3 (39.6)
Mean daily maximum °F (°C)	42.2 (5.7)	48.0 (8.9)	56.2 (13.4)	62.7 (17.1)	72.4 (22.4)	82.9 (28.3)	93.6 (34.2)	91.5 (33.1)	82.0 (27.8)	67.7 (19.8)	52.5 (11.4)	41.4 (5.2)	66.1 (18.9)
Daily mean °F (°C)	30.7 (−0.7)	35.5 (1.9)	41.5 (5.3)	46.7 (8.2)	55.4 (13.0)	63.5 (17.5)	71.9 (22.2)	69.6 (20.9)	60.7 (15.9)	48.5 (9.2)	37.9 (3.3)	29.7 (−1.3)	49.3 (9.6)
Mean daily minimum °F (°C)	19.1 (−7.2)	23.0 (−5.0)	26.8 (−2.9)	30.8 (−0.7)	38.3 (3.5)	44.0 (6.7)	50.3 (10.2)	47.7 (8.7)	39.4 (4.1)	29.4 (−1.4)	23.3 (−4.8)	18.1 (−7.7)	32.5 (0.3)
Mean minimum °F (°C)	−0.8 (−18.2)	7.0 (−13.9)	12.9 (−10.6)	17.2 (−8.2)	23.7 (−4.6)	31.5 (−0.3)	39.7 (4.3)	36.0 (2.2)	26.7 (−2.9)	15.2 (−9.3)	6.1 (−14.4)	−0.7 (−18.2)	−7.0 (−21.7)
Record low °F (°C)	−30 (−34)	−26 (−32)	−1 (−18)	7 (−14)	15 (−9)	23 (−5)	32 (0)	25 (−4)	14 (−10)	−5 (−21)	−13 (−25)	−35 (−37)	−35 (−37)
Average precipitation inches (mm)	1.26 (32)	0.83 (21)	1.04 (26)	1.28 (33)	1.31 (33)	0.77 (20)	0.21 (5.3)	0.26 (6.6)	0.51 (13)	0.89 (23)	0.72 (18)	1.14 (29)	10.22 (259.9)
Average snowfall inches (cm)	4.9 (12)	2.5 (6.4)	1.4 (3.6)	1.4 (3.6)	0.1 (0.25)	0.0 (0.0)	0.0 (0.0)	0.0 (0.0)	0.0 (0.0)	0.3 (0.76)	1.1 (2.8)	4.0 (10)	15.7 (39.41)
Average precipitation days (≥ 0.01 in)	6.5	6.1	6.6	6.5	6.9	3.5	1.9	1.8	2.3	3.7	5.0	6.7	57.5
Average snowy days (≥ 0.1 in)	1.9	1.4	0.5	0.5	0.0	0.0	0.0	0.0	0.0	0.1	0.6	2.0	7.0
Source 1: NOAA
Source 2: National Weather Service

== Education ==
The Humboldt County School District operates schools serving areas with Orovada addresses. Some areas are zoned to Orovada School, a K-8 school. Other areas are zoned to Kings River School, a K-8 school.

In 1954, the Orovada School had 22 students. A new 3,200-square-foot (300 m^{2}) building, designed by Alegre and Hanson and built by A.T. Costa, opened in 1958. The two classroom facility and two teacher apartment facilities were made of pumice. Orovada School had 50 students in the 1963-1964 school year. In 1966, some parents stated that the district needed a new heating system in the school and they would prevent their children from attending if this was not done.

Kings River School had 15 students in the 1963-1964 school year.

== Notable person ==
Rodeo announcer Bob Tallman lived on Willow Creek Ranch, eight miles (12.9 km) north of Orovada, during his early childhood.

== Demographics ==
Historical population
Census	Pop.	Note	%±
2020	117		—
U.S. Decennial Census
