= Ryndon, Nevada =

Unincorporated community in Nevada, US

- Unincorporated community
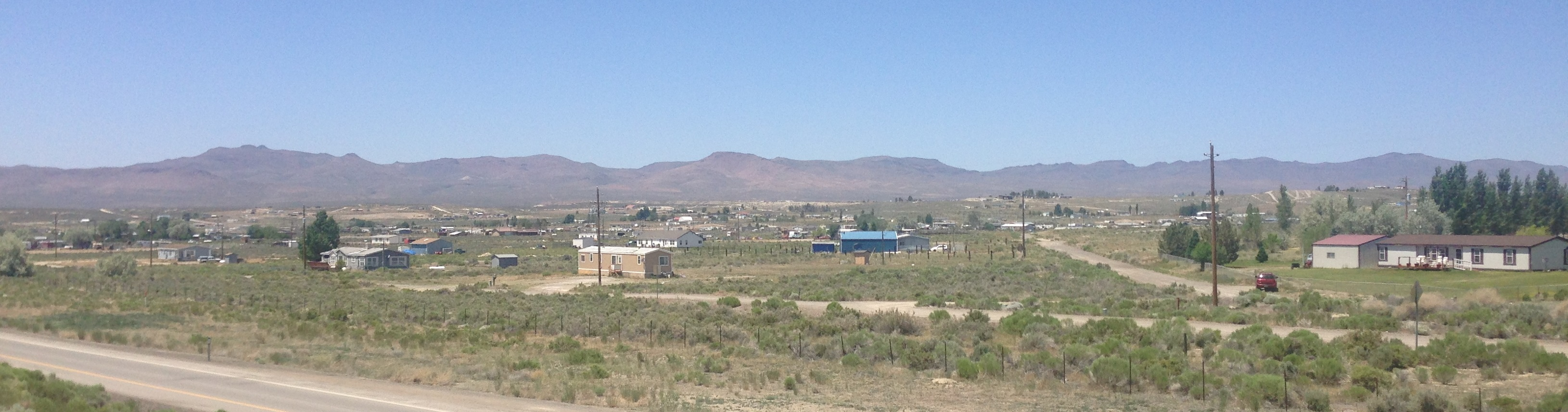

- Location within Nevada
- Coordinates: 40°56′31″N 115°35′44″W
- Country: United States
- State: Nevada
- County: Elko
- Elevation: 5,164 ft (1,574 m)
- Time zone: UTC-8 (Pacific (PST))
  - Summer (DST): UTC-7 (PDT)
- ZIP code: 89801
- Area code: 775
- GNIS feature ID: 856361

Ryndon is an unincorporated community in central Elko County, Nevada, United States. It is part of the Elko micropolitan area.

== Description ==
The community is located on Interstate 80 and the Humboldt River in Osino Canyon, about 11 miles (18 km) northeast of Elko.
