= KCEC (TV) =

Television station in Boulder, Colorado

- Boulder–Denver, Colorado; United States
- City: Boulder, Colorado
- Channels: Digital: 32 (UHF); Virtual: 14
- Branding: Univision Colorado; Noticias Univision Colorado (newscasts)

Programming
- Affiliations: 14.1: Univision; for others, see § Subchannels

Ownership
- Owner: TelevisaUnivision; (Spanish Television of Denver, Inc.)
- Operator: Entravision Communications via LMA
- Sister stations: KTFD-TV; KJMN, KMXA, KXPK

History
- First air date: February 22, 1996
- Former call signs: KTVJ (1996–2003); KTFD-TV (2003–2009); KTFD-DT (2009–2017)
- Former channel numbers: Analog: 14 (UHF, 1996–2009); Digital: 15 (UHF, until 2020); Translator: KDVT-LP 36 (UHF) Denver
- Former affiliations: Independent (1996–2003); Telefutura/UniMás (2003–2017)
- Call sign meaning: Drawn from K49CE, the call letters of the predecessor low-power Univision station; "KCEC" was used as a brand

Technical information
- Licensing authority: FCC
- Facility ID: 57219
- ERP: 650 kW
- HAAT: 363 m (1,191 ft)
- Transmitter coordinates: 39°40′17.4″N 105°13′8.0″W

Links
- Public license information: Public file; LMS
- Website: coloradonoticias.com

KCEC (channel 14) is a television station licensed to Boulder, Colorado, United States, broadcasting the Spanish-language Univision network to the Denver area. Owned by TelevisaUnivision, it is operated under a local marketing agreement (LMA) by Entravision Communications as a sister station to UniMás affiliate KTFD-TV (channel 50). The two stations share studios on Mile High Stadium West Circle in Jefferson Park, Denver; KCEC's transmitter is located atop Mount Morrison in western Jefferson County.

KVSN-DT (channel 48) in Pueblo operates as a semi-satellite of KCEC, expanding the Univision signal into South-Central Colorado. As such, it simulcasts all Univision programming as provided through its parent, and the two stations share a website. However, KVSN airs separate commercial inserts and legal identifications. Local newscasts, produced by KCEC and branded as Noticias Univision Colorado, are simulcast on both stations. KVSN does not maintain any facilities in Pueblo or Colorado Springs; master control and internal operations are based at KCEC's studios.

== History ==
The station first signed on the air on February 22, 1996, as KTVJ. Founded by Roberts Broadcasting, it originally aired programming from the Home Shopping Network. In January 2003, Roberts sold the station to Univision Communications. Two months later on March 10, 2003, the station changed its call sign to KTFD-TV (which was modified to KTFD-DT on June 23, 2009, in correspondence with the callsign modifications to the "-DT" suffix applied by all Univision-owned stations following the digital television transition), and became an owned-and-operated station of Univision's secondary network TeleFutura.

=== 2017 license and channel swap ===
On December 4, 2017, as part of a multi-market realignment, the programming and call signs of KTFD and sister station KCEC were swapped: KTFD and its UniMás programming moved to the Entravision-owned facility using digital channel 26 and virtual channel 50, while Univision's digital channel 15 and virtual channel 14 facility became the new home of KCEC.

== Technical information ==
=== Subchannels ===
The station's signal is multiplexed:

Subchannels of KCEC
Channel	Res.	Short name	Programming
14.1	1080i	KCEC	Univision
14.2	480i	MSGold	MovieSphere Gold
14.3	480i	GetTV	Great (4:3)
14.4	480i	BT2	Infomercials
14.5	480i	ShopLC	Shop LC

Subchannel broadcast with MPEG-4 video

=== Analog-to-digital conversion ===
KCEC (as KTFD-TV) shut down its analog signal, over UHF channel 14, on June 12, 2009, the official date on which full-power television in the United States transitioned from analog to digital broadcasts under federal mandate. The station's digital signal remained on its pre-transition UHF channel 15, using virtual channel 14.

On April 29, 2020, KCEC completed the migration from digital channel 15 to channel 32 as part of the FCC spectrum auction repack.

=== Former translator ===
KTFD's signal was formerly relayed on low-power analog translator station KDVT-LP (channel 36) in Denver, which was owned by Entravision Communications. The translator was never converted to digital, and its license was canceled on September 13, 2017.
