= KTFD-TV =

Television station in Denver

- Denver, Colorado; United States
- Channels: Digital: 28 (UHF); Virtual: 50
- Branding: UniMás Colorado

Programming
- Affiliations: 50.1: UniMás; for others, see § Subchannels

Ownership
- Owner: Entravision Communications; (Entravision Holdings, LLC)
- Sister stations: TV: KCEC; Radio: KJMN, KMXA, KXPK

History
- Founded: 1989
- First air date: July 8, 1991
- Former call signs: KSHP (1990–1991); KCEC (1991–2009); KCEC-DT (2009–2017)
- Former channel numbers: Analog: 50 (UHF, 1991–2009); Digital: 51 (UHF, until 2015), 26 (UHF, 2015–2019)
- Former affiliations: Univision (1991–2017)
- Call sign meaning: TeleFutura Denver

Technical information
- Licensing authority: FCC
- Facility ID: 24514
- ERP: 400 kW
- HAAT: 236 m (774 ft)
- Transmitter coordinates: 39°43′58″N 105°14′10″W

Links
- Public license information: Public file; LMS

KTFD-TV (channel 50) is a television station in Denver, Colorado, United States, affiliated with the Spanish-language network UniMás. It is owned by Entravision Communications, which provides certain services to Boulder-licensed Univision-owned station KCEC (channel 14) under a local marketing agreement (LMA) with TelevisaUnivision. The two stations share studios on Mile High Stadium West Circle in Denver; KTFD-TV's transmitter is located atop Lookout Mountain, near Golden.

== History ==
The history of Spanish-language television in Colorado begins with the installation of the second "satellator"—satellite-fed translator—for the then-Spanish International Network, which began broadcasting on channel 31 in 1982. It moved to channel 49 after full-power station KDVR was built on that channel, and in 1989, local operations began out of a small facility in Lakewood. The local translator had the call sign K49CE, and the station called itself "KCEC". Between 1989 and 1990, the local operation, owned by Lomas de Oro Broadcasting Corporation, expanded from five personnel to 20.

Simultaneously, in 1986, Lomas de Oro had applied for a construction permit for channel 50 in Denver. This was granted on November 1, 1989, and on July 8, 1991, the low-power channel 49 was replaced with a new KCEC (previously KSHP) on channel 50, a power boost that brought the station into 30,000 more households and led to a doubling of the number of viewers watching Spanish-language TV in the Denver area.

Entravision Communications purchased KCEC in 1997 from the Golden Hills Broadcasting Corporation, successor to Lomas de Oro, as part of a merger of Entravision founder Walter Ulloa's broadcast interests into one company. Entravision moved its studios from Lakewood to a facility on Grant Street at the end of 1999; it relocated again in 2012 to its present studio facility located near Sports Authority Field (now Empower Field at Mile High), which houses the company's 60 employees.

In 2009, the station debuted a locally produced telenovela titled Encrucijada: Sin Salud, no hay Nada (translated as Crossroads: Without Health, There is Nothing), in conjunction with the Colorado Health Foundation, that focused on the ongoing obesity crisis in the United States in order to educate Coloradoans on healthier eating habits; a second season of the series was ordered and broadcast in 2011.

=== 2017 license and channel swap ===
On December 4, 2017, as part of a multi-market realignment, the programming and call signs of KCEC and sister station KTFD were swapped: KCEC and its Univision programming moved to the Univision-owned facility using digital channel 15 and virtual channel 14, while Entravision's digital channel 26 and virtual channel 50 facility became the new home of UniMás affiliate KTFD-TV.

== News operation ==
By 1993, KCEC was airing locally produced two-minute newsbriefs three times a day. This grew into a full-length 30-minute early evening newscast on January 30, 1995, with the program originally anchored by news director Rodolfo Cárdenas (who had defected from KUBD (channel 59), the Telemundo affiliate) and Luis Canela. A live 10 p.m. newscast debuted in 2001.

In 1997, an anonymous tip faxed to the station led to it breaking news of an impending raid by the U.S. Immigration and Naturalization Service, which canceled the sting operation as a result. Yrma Rico, who served as KCEC's general manager, told The Denver Post, "We don't want to lose our viewers."

While the station's ratings steadily rose to become competitive with those of the market's English-language stations among adults 18–34 and 18–49 by 2010, Telemundo station KDEN-TV has increased its ratings over the course of the 2010s.

== Technical information ==
=== Subchannels ===
The station's signal is multiplexed:

Subchannels of KTFD-TV
Channel	Res.	Short name	Programming
50.1	1080i	UniMas	UniMás
50.2	480i	LATV	LATV
50.88	1080i	AltaVsn	AltaVision

Subchannel broadcast with MPEG-4 video

=== Analog-to-digital conversion ===
KTFD-TV (as KCEC) shut down its analog signal, over UHF channel 50, on June 12, 2009, the official date on which full-power television stations in the United States transitioned from analog to digital broadcasts under federal mandate. The station's digital signal remained on its pre-transition UHF channel 51, using virtual channel 50. The station was licensed to move its digital signal to channel 26 on May 20, 2015.

On January 9, 2019, KTFD completed the migration from digital channel 26 to channel 28 as part of the FCC spectrum auction repack.
