= Super Bowl XLVIII =

2014 National Football League championship game

Seattle Seahawks (1) (NFC) (13–3)	Denver Broncos (1) (AFC) (13–3)
43	8
Head coach: Pete Carroll	Head coach: John Fox
	1	2	3	4	Total
SEA	8	14	14	7	43
DEN	0	0	8	0	8
- Date: February 2, 2014
- Kickoff time: 6:32 p.m. EST (UTC-5)
- Stadium: MetLife Stadium; East Rutherford, New Jersey
- MVP: Malcolm Smith, linebacker
- Favorite: Broncos by 2
- Referee: Terry McAulay
- Attendance: 82,529

Ceremonies
- National anthem: Renée Fleming
- Coin toss: Joe Namath and Phil Simms
- Halftime show: Bruno Mars and Red Hot Chili Peppers

TV in the United States
- Network: Fox
- Announcers: Joe Buck (play-by-play); Troy Aikman (analyst); Pam Oliver and Erin Andrews (sideline reporters); Mike Pereira (rules analyst)
- Nielsen ratings: 46.4 (national); 56.7 (Seattle); 50.5 (New York); 51.4 (Denver); US viewership: 111.5 million est. avg., 167 million est. total
- Market share: 69 (national)
- Cost of 30-second commercial: $4 million

Radio in the United States
- Network: Westwood One
- Announcers: Kevin Harlan (play-by-play); Boomer Esiason (analyst); James Lofton and Mark Malone (sideline reporters)

Super Bowl XLVIII was an American football game between the American Football Conference (AFC) champion Denver Broncos and National Football Conference (NFC) champion Seattle Seahawks to decide the National Football League (NFL) champion for the 2013 season. The underdog Seahawks defeated the favored Broncos 43–8 to win their first Super Bowl. It is the largest margin of victory for an underdog and tied with Super Bowl XXVII (1993) for the third largest point differential overall (35) in Super Bowl history. The game was played on February 2, 2014, at MetLife Stadium at the Meadowlands Sports Complex in East Rutherford, New Jersey, the first Super Bowl played outdoors in a cold-weather city and the first one played in New Jersey. Seahawks linebacker Malcolm Smith, who returned an interception 69 yards for a touchdown, recovered a fumble and made nine tackles, was named Super Bowl MVP.

The Seahawks posted a 13–3 record and were making their second Super Bowl appearance in nine years. The Broncos were making their seventh Super Bowl appearance after also posting a 13–3 record. The game became the first Super Bowl victory for the Seahawks and the fifth Super Bowl loss for the Broncos, at the time a league record (it would later be tied by the New England Patriots following their Super Bowl LII loss, then surpassed following the Patriots’ Super Bowl LX loss) for the most of any team. This marked one of the few times that two former divisional rivals met in a Super Bowl, as the Seahawks and Broncos were in the same division (the AFC West) from 1977 to 2001.

Seattle led 22–0 at halftime and ultimately went up 36–0 before allowing Denver's first and only score on the final play of the third quarter. The Seahawks set a record by making the first seven scores of the game; previously the record was four. The 36–0 lead was by far the largest shutout lead in Super Bowl history; the previous record was 24–0, shared by the Miami Dolphins over the Minnesota Vikings in Super Bowl VIII and the Washington Redskins over the Buffalo Bills in Super Bowl XXVI. Seahawks defensive end Cliff Avril scored a safety on the first play from scrimmage. They became the first team in a Super Bowl to score on a safety (12 seconds into the start of the game which set the record for the quickest score), a kickoff return for a touchdown (12 seconds into the second half), and an interception return for a touchdown. The Broncos were held to almost 30 points below their scoring average. Broncos quarterback Peyton Manning, a five-time NFL Most Valuable Player (MVP) award winner, one of which during the 2013 season, set a Super Bowl record with 34 completions but managed only one touchdown pass and threw two interceptions in the first half.

The game was the first time since Super Bowl XXV 23 years prior that the #1 scoring offense (Broncos) went up against the #1 scoring defense (Seahawks). It was the fifth Super Bowl where the winning team outscored the losing team in every quarter. In addition, it was the first time the winning team scored over 40 points while holding the opponent team to under 10 in the Super Bowl. Seattle also tied the 1992 Dallas Cowboys for the third-largest blowout in Super Bowl history. In retrospect, Super Bowl XLVIII is considered among the worst Super Bowls due to the game's one-sidedness from start to finish. However, the Seahawks' 2013 defense is often regarded as one of the greatest defenses in NFL history following the game.

In the United States, the game was televised by Fox; with an average audience of 111.5 million viewers that peaked at 115.3 million during the halftime show featuring Bruno Mars. The game was briefly the most-watched U.S. television broadcast of all time, until it was surpassed by Super Bowl XLIX the following year. The game's inaugural Spanish-language telecast on Fox Deportes was also the highest-rated Spanish-language cable telecast outside of soccer.

The Seahawks would make their third Super Bowl appearance the following year and ultimately lost to the Patriots 28–24. The Seahawks did not make another Super Bowl appearance until eleven years later in 2026, where they earned a Super Bowl XLIX rematch with the Patriots, winning 29–13 in Super Bowl LX. That victory marks the Seahawks' second Super Bowl win after their inaugural win from this game.

== Background ==
=== Previous plans for a Super Bowl in the New York City area ===
Efforts to see the New York City area host a Super Bowl predate MetLife Stadium's planning.

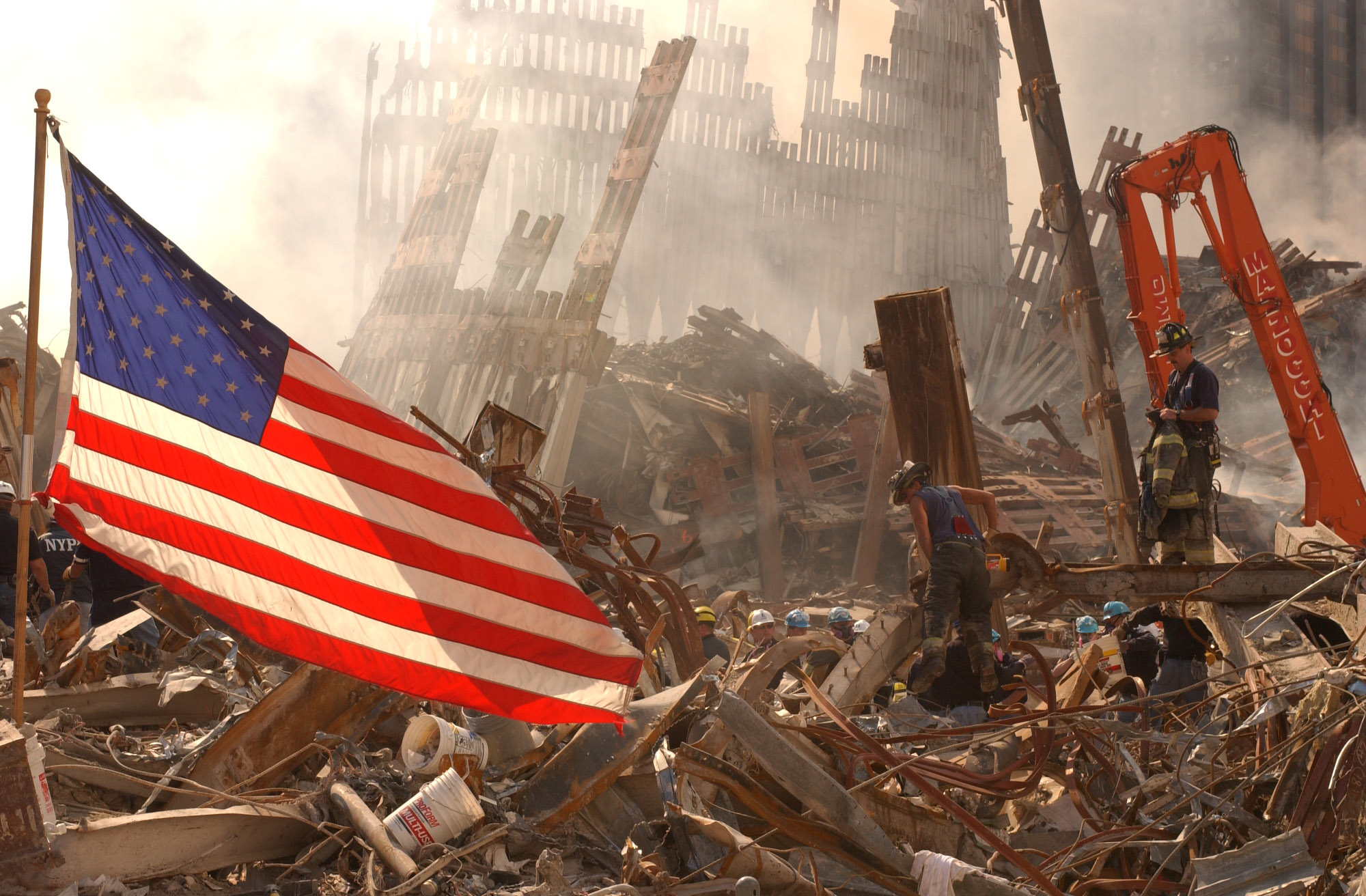
The 9/11 terrorist attacks sparked an interest in New York City hosting a Super Bowl to symbolize national recovery following the attacks

In the aftermath of the 9/11 terrorist attacks in New York City and Washington, D.C., those metro areas' business communities separately discussed seeking to host a future Super Bowl. The general thought was that either of these cities being the location of a Super Bowl would symbolize national recovery in the aftermath of the attacks. There was belief that if New York were awarded a Super Bowl (either building a new stadium or renovated the existing Giants Stadium to be the host venue), it might assist the city's bid for the 2012 Summer Olympics in the same vein that awarding Super Bowl XXVIII to the city of Atlanta may have assisted the prospects of Atlanta's ultimately successful bid for the 1996 Summer Olympics.

Both New York City and Washington, D.C. were, at one point, seen as likely to bid in 2003 for either 2008's Super Bowl XLII or 2009's Super Bowl XLIII. However, the prospect of the New York City region hosting a Super Bowl proved challenging due not only to the non-ideal cold weather climate, but also due to the difficulty in delivering an appropriate host venue. The city of New York and the New York Jets failed to secure a deal to build a new West Side Stadium in Manhattan (which, according to the initial plans, would have been built with a roof). Proposed renovations to the aging Giants Stadium were still subject to dispute between stakeholders. Giants Stadium lacked a roof, as did the city's two Major League Baseball stadiums. The lack of a venue with a roof was also seen as an obstacle due to the NFL having never played an outdoor Super Bowl in a cold weather climate.

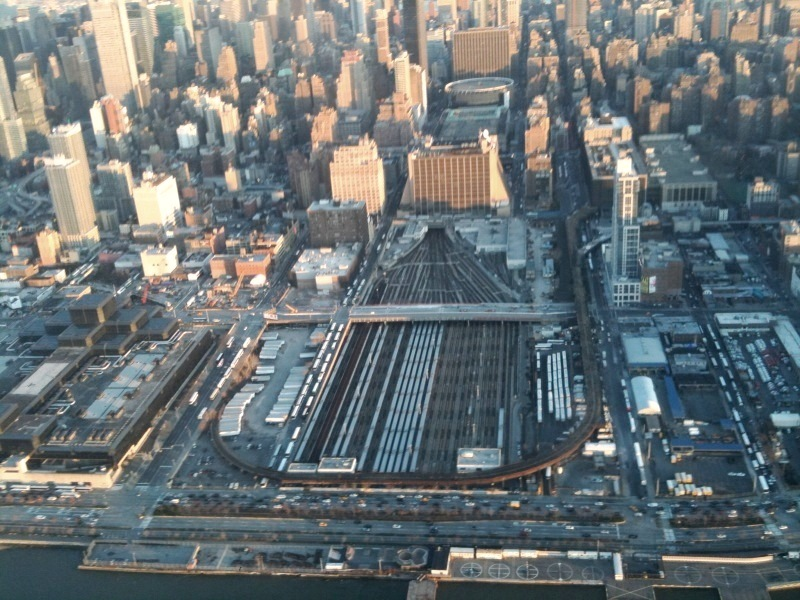
The proposed site of the canceled West Side Stadium in New York City, which had initially been selected as the host of 2010's Super Bowl XLIV

New York City ultimately bid in 2005 for a Super Bowl. The NFL voted on March 23, 2005, to award New York City the rights to host 2010's Super Bowl XLIV, contingent on the proposed West Side Stadium (the planned site of the game) being completed by 2008. In August 2005, after New York state government officials declined to approve $400 million for the stadium, the NFL decided to revoke New York City's hosting rights, and reopen the bidding for the game's site.

=== Host selection process ===
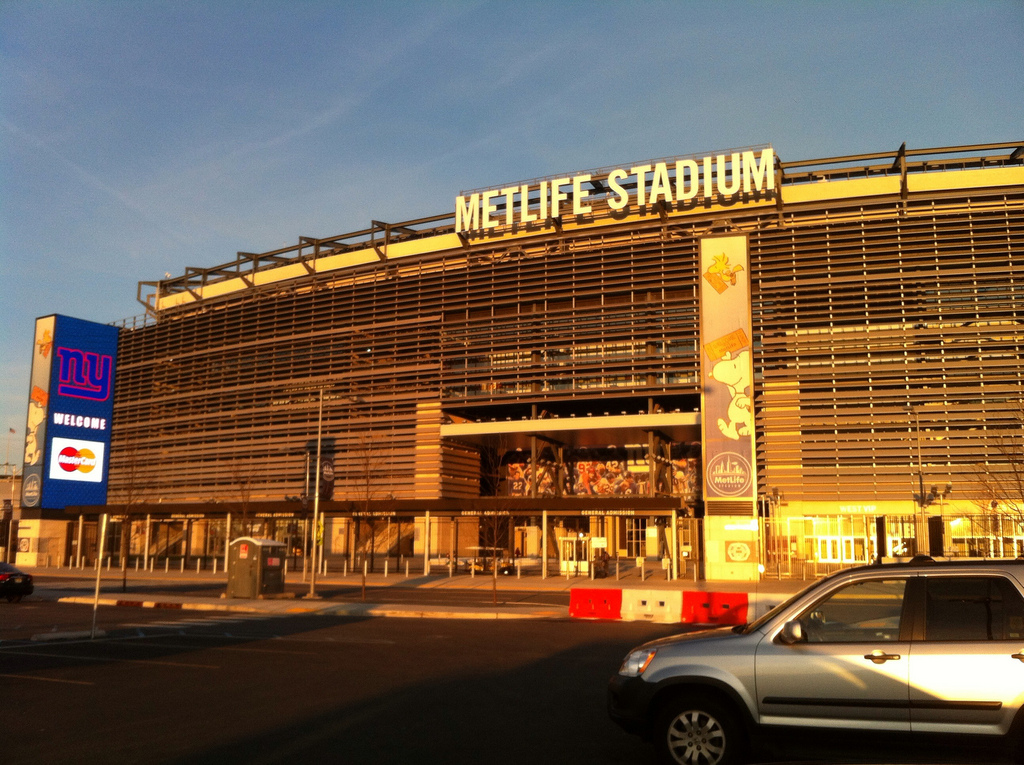
MetLife Stadium in East Rutherford, New Jersey (part of the New York metropolitan area) was selected to host Super Bowl XLVIII.

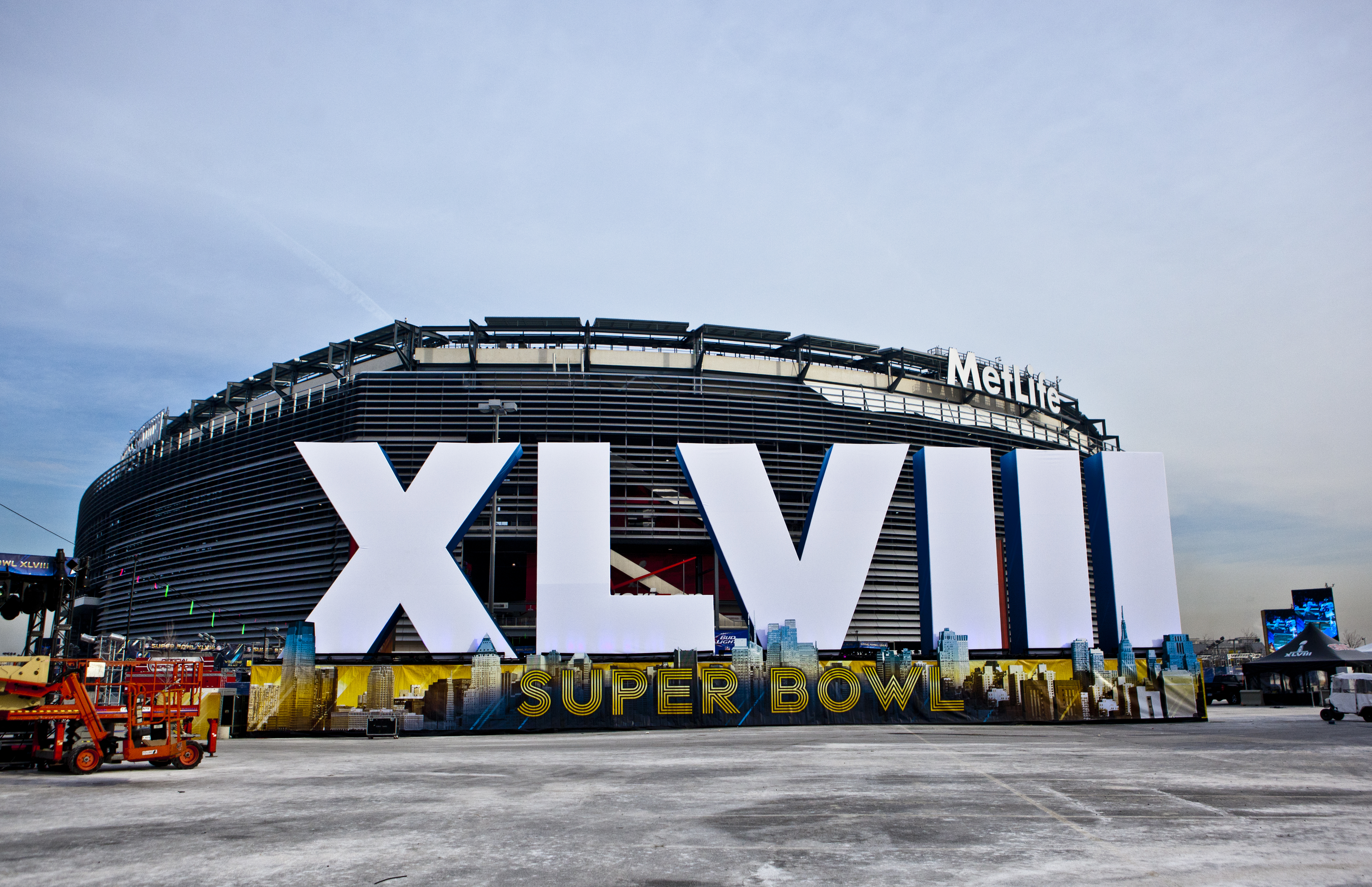
Exterior of MetLife Stadium for Super Bowl XLVIII

Three stadiums were part of the bidding to host the game:

1. MetLife Stadium – East Rutherford, New Jersey
2. Raymond James Stadium – Tampa, Florida
3. Sun Life Stadium – Miami Gardens, Florida

Tampa had hosted four Super Bowls (XVIII, XXV, XXXV and XLIII), while South Florida / Miami had hosted ten Super Bowls (II, III, V, X, XIII, XXIII, XXIX, XXXIII, XLI and XLIV).

During the voting process by the league owners, the South Florida/Miami bid was eliminated in the second round of voting, but it eventually took the fourth round of voting for New Jersey's bid to beat Tampa's. The game was awarded on May 26, 2010, at the NFL owners meetings in Irving, Texas.

Super Bowl XLVIII was the first Super Bowl held at an open-air stadium in a "cold-weather" city; previous Super Bowls in cold-weather cities were held at indoor stadiums. However, the temperature at kickoff was a mild 49 °F (9 °C) making this only the third-coldest Super Bowl., and a major snow storm hit the area the very next day. According to Weather.com, the average high and low temperatures for East Rutherford on February 2 were 39 °F (4 °C) and 20 °F (−7 °C), respectively. The coldest outdoor Super Bowl of the first 47 games was Super Bowl VI, held at Tulane Stadium in New Orleans on January 16, 1972, with a kickoff temperature of 39 °F (4 °C) (Tulane Stadium also hosted the second coldest outdoor Super Bowl, Super Bowl IX, with a kickoff temperature of 46 °F (8 °C)). However, New Orleans usually has a humid subtropical climate, with January morning lows averaging around 46 °F (8 °C) and daily highs around 63 °F (17 °C); also, all New Orleans Super Bowls since XII have been played at the indoor Superdome. Since Super Bowl X in 1976, all but one outdoor Super Bowl has been played in either California or Florida, the exception being Super Bowl XXX in Tempe, Arizona. NFL Commissioner Roger Goodell indicated that if Super Bowl XLVIII was successful, additional "cold-weather" Super Bowls would be considered.

Super Bowl XLVIII was the first NFL championship game to be held in the New York metropolitan area since December 30, 1962, when the Green Bay Packers beat the New York Giants in the original Yankee Stadium, 16–7. Since then, two other major pro football leagues have held title games in the area:

- 1968 AFL Championship Game at Shea Stadium, December 29, 1968: New York Jets 27, Oakland Raiders 23. The Jets went on to Super Bowl III, where they upset the Baltimore Colts, 16–7.
- 1985 USFL Championship Game at Giants Stadium, July 14, 1985: Baltimore Stars 28, Oakland Invaders 24. This game turned out to be the final contest in the league's three-year history.

MetLife Stadium was the first Super Bowl venue that was simultaneously home to two NFL teams: the New York Giants and the New York Jets, and thus was the first championship game to have two host teams. The Los Angeles Memorial Coliseum (which hosted Super Bowls I and VII) served as the home of the Los Angeles Rams and the Los Angeles Raiders, but not at the same time.

This was also the first Super Bowl played outdoors on artificial turf (FieldTurf) since Super Bowl X (1976) at the Miami Orange Bowl. It was also the first in which two U.S. states, New York and New Jersey, shared hosting duties. This was also the first Super Bowl to be played outdoors since Super Bowl XLIV was played in Miami Gardens.

==== Winter outlook and contingency plans ====
The choice of holding the Super Bowl outdoors in a cold weather environment generated some controversy. When it was released in August 2013, the "Winter Outlook" section in the 2014 Farmers' Almanac predicted that a winter storm would hit just about the time Super Bowl XLVIII kicked off; this generated the attention of several media sources, including ESPN's Rick Reilly in a piece that aired on ESPN's Monday Night Countdown on October 21, 2013. In a radio interview broadcast on WFAN, Fox studio analyst Terry Bradshaw stated that he opposes the idea of a cold Super Bowl, stating "I don't want it to be bad ... What if we get two passing teams?" In a piece published on Sports Illustrated's "Monday Morning Quarterback" site, Seattle Seahawks cornerback Richard Sherman also opposed holding the game at MetLife Stadium, stating that "it's the league's responsibility to show its audience the best possible product, and this can't happen in the snow." The decision to play the game in New Jersey was made even more controversial by the fact that the NFL informed the Miami Dolphins that Sun Life Stadium would never host another Super Bowl until they put a roof over the stadium for fear of rain.

The NFL announced on December 18, 2013, that in the event of a forecast of heavy snow, the game would be rescheduled for the Saturday before, or Monday or Tuesday after.

One day before the Super Bowl, weather conditions for the game were forecast to be mostly cloudy with temperatures in the low to mid-40s Fahrenheit.

A winter storm arrived 6 hours after the game ended, dropping 8 inches (20 cm) of snow on the region. The inclement weather canceled a quarter of the flights available at the area's three major airports, stranding thousands of travelers throughout the metro region, including many of the attendees of the game.

=== Nicknames ===
Super Bowl XLVIII earned a few unofficial nicknames, with the "Weed Bowl", "Bong Bowl", and "Marijuana Bowl" being among the most prominent, from users of social networking websites and various news outlets as the home states of the Seahawks and Broncos (Washington and Colorado, respectively) were the first two states to legalize marijuana for recreational use, during the fall 2012 elections.

=== Teams ===
The Broncos and Seahawks were divisional AFC West rivals from 1977 until 2001, when the Seahawks moved to the NFC West. Their matchup in Super Bowl XLVIII marked the first time former in-division rivals met in the Super Bowl since Super Bowl XLIII.

==== Seattle Seahawks ====
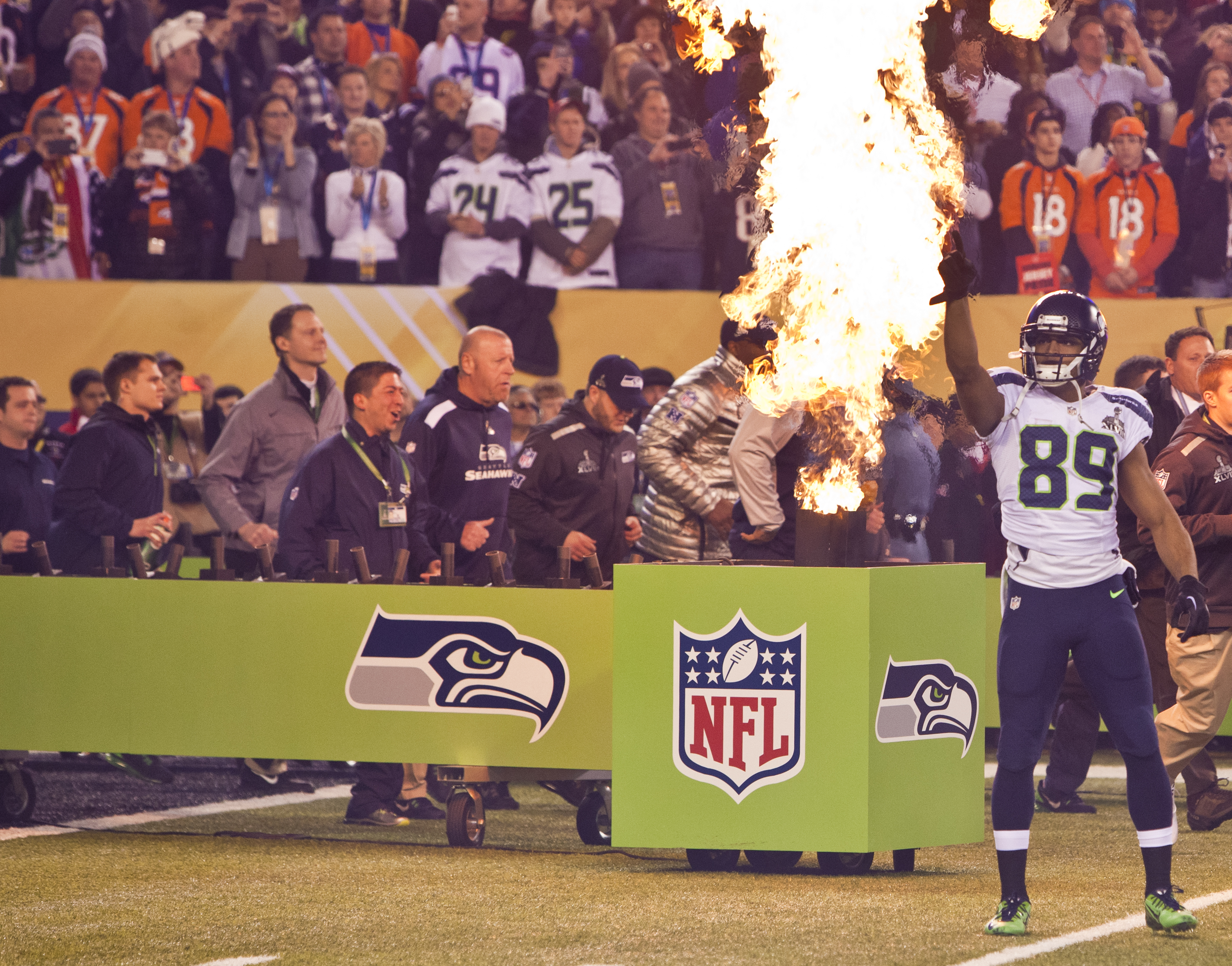
Doug Baldwin before Super Bowl XLVIII

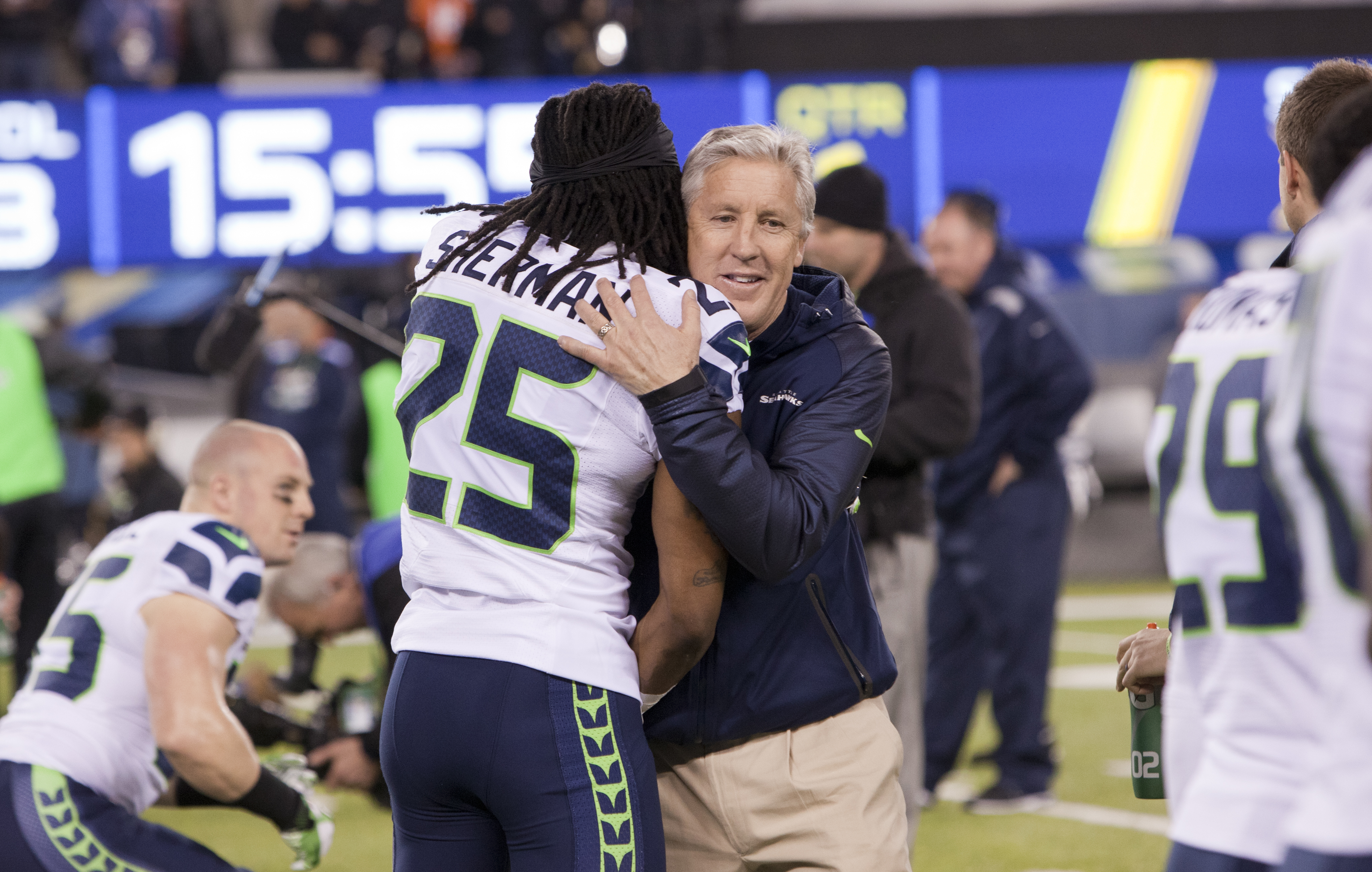
Richard Sherman and Pete Carroll embracing at Super Bowl XLVIII

Seattle finished the season 13–3, winning the NFC West division and home-field advantage throughout the playoffs. The team scored 417 points during the season, while giving up 231.

The offense was led by second-year quarterback Russell Wilson, a third-round draft pick who won the starting role after a three-way quarterback competition in training camp and went on to win a playoff game in his rookie season with the Seahawks. In his second season, he completed 63.1 percent of his passes for 3,357 yards and 26 touchdowns, with only nine interceptions, while also rushing for 539 yards and another score. His 101.2 passer rating ranked him seventh in the NFL, and made him the first quarterback in history with a triple-digit passer rating in his first two seasons. His top target was Pro Bowl receiver Golden Tate, who caught 64 passes for 898 yards and five touchdowns. Tate was also a major asset on special teams, returning 51 punts for 585 yards (second in the NFL). Other key targets included Doug Baldwin (50 receptions, 775 yards, five touchdowns) and tight end Zach Miller (33 receptions, 387 yards, five touchdowns). Pro Bowl running back Marshawn Lynch was the team's leading rusher with 1,257 yards and 12 touchdowns. He was also a reliable receiver, hauling in 36 passes for 316 yards and two more scores. The Seahawks' offensive line was led by Pro Bowl center Max Unger. Kicker Steven Hauschka ranked fourth in the NFL in scoring (143 points) and second in field goal percentage (.943, 33/35).

Seattle had the NFL's top defense, with the fewest yards allowed per game (273.6), fewest points allowed (231) and most takeaways (39). They were the first team since the 1985 Chicago Bears to lead the league in all three categories. The Seahawks were also the fourth team to lead the NFL in interceptions and fewest passing yards allowed; all four teams reached the Super Bowl. Seattle's defensive line featured defensive ends Cliff Avril and Michael Bennett, both of whom recorded eight sacks. Avril also forced five fumbles, while Bennett recovered three, returning them for 39 yards and a touchdown. Defensive tackle Clinton McDonald also made a big impact with 5.5 sacks, two fumble recoveries and an interception. Linebacker Bobby Wagner led the team in combined tackles (120), while also racking up five sacks and two interceptions. But the best aspect of the defense was their secondary – collectively known as the Legion of Boom – which sent three of their four starters to the Pro Bowl: cornerback Richard Sherman, who led the NFL in interceptions (eight, with 125 return yards), along with free safety Earl Thomas (five interceptions, 105 tackles, two forced fumbles) and strong safety Kam Chancellor (99 tackles, three interceptions, 78 return yards).

==== Denver Broncos ====
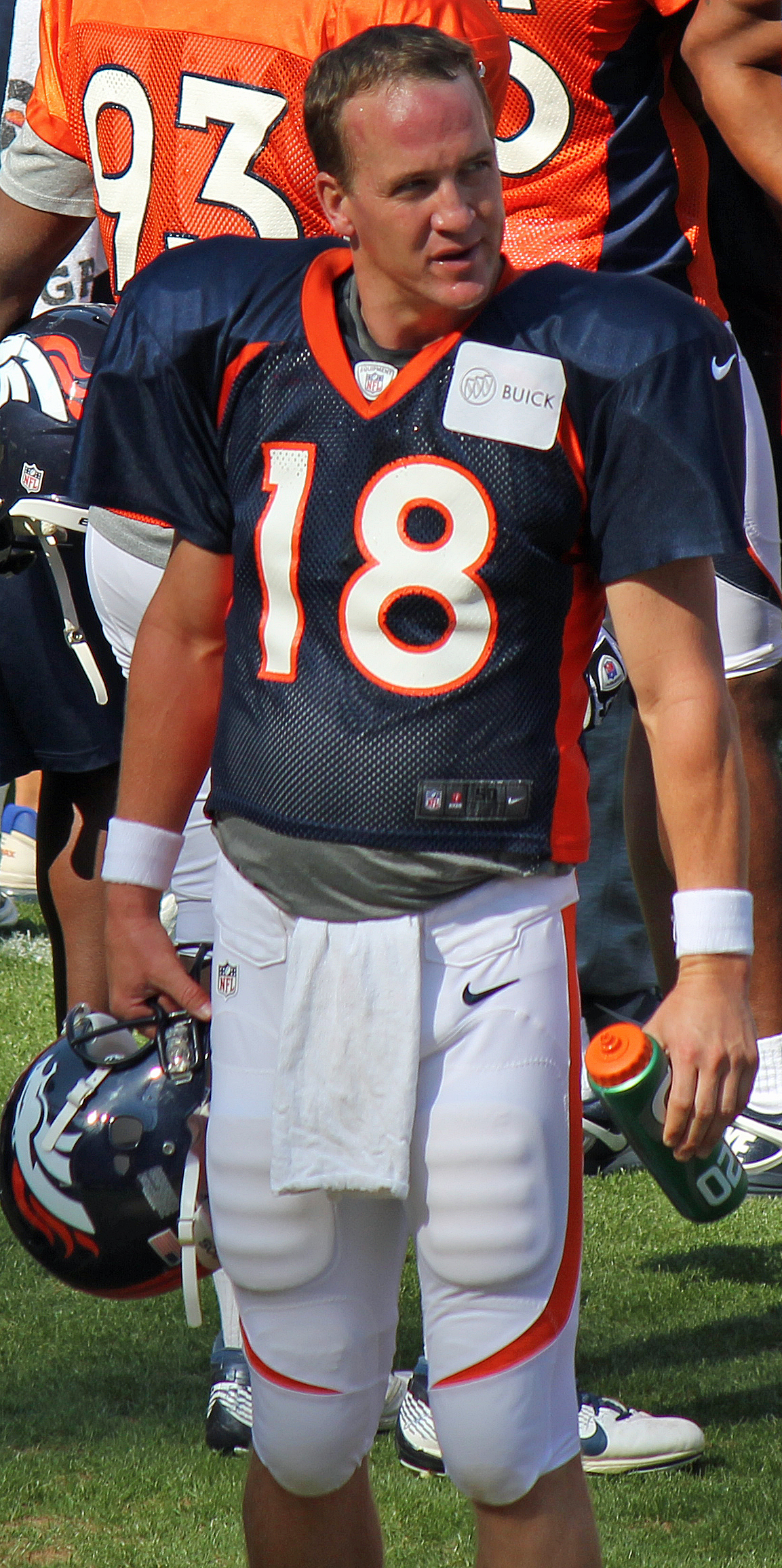
Broncos quarterback Peyton Manning won the 2013 regular season MVP award.

Denver finished the season 13–3 for the second straight year, winning the AFC West division and home-field advantage throughout the playoffs. The Broncos had the best offense in the NFL, leading the league in points scored (606, the highest total in NFL history) and yards gained (7,313). The offense was so explosive that they scored points on their opening possession at least eight straight games leading into the playoffs and a ninth time against the San Diego Chargers during the Divisional Playoffs game. During the AFC Championship Game against the New England Patriots, they broke that streak, only to score on the opening possession of the second half. In only five out of 18 games (including playoffs) did they score fewer than 30 points, the fewest being 20 points.

In command of the offense was 16-year veteran quarterback Peyton Manning. Now in his second year as the team's starter, Manning posted one of the best seasons of any quarterback in NFL history (and the best season of his entire career), leading the league in completions, attempts, yards and touchdown passes. His 5,477 passing yards and 55 touchdown completions both set new NFL records. His total of 450 completions was the second-highest in NFL history, and his 115.1 passer rating ranked second in the league that season. Denver's leading pass-catcher was Pro Bowl receiver Demaryius Thomas, who caught 92 passes for 1,430 yards and 14 touchdowns, but Manning had plenty of other reliable options, including Eric Decker (97 receptions, 1,288 yards, 11 touchdowns), Wes Welker (73 receptions, 778 yards, 10 touchdowns) and Pro Bowl tight end Julius Thomas (65 receptions, 788 yards, 12 touchdowns). Overall, they made Denver the first team in NFL history ever to have four players with at least 10 touchdown receptions in a season. Running back Knowshon Moreno was the team's leading rusher with 1,038 yards and 10 touchdowns, while also catching 60 passes for 548 yards and another three scores. Rookie running back Montee Ball was also a big contributor with 554 rushing yards, four touchdowns and 20 receptions. The team's offensive line featured Pro Bowl guard Louis Vasquez. On special teams, Pro Bowl kicker Matt Prater ranked second in the NFL in scoring (150 points) and first in field goal percentage (.962, 25/26). His only miss of the year was from 52 yards and his successful attempt from 64 yards against Tennessee in Week 14 broke an NFL record that had stood for 44 years.

Defensive end Shaun Phillips anchored the Broncos' line with 10 sacks, while linebacker Danny Trevathan racked up 129 combined tackles, three forced fumbles and three interceptions. Defensive end Malik Jackson was also a key component of the defense with 42 tackles and six sacks, helping compensate for the loss of Von Miller, who had five sacks in nine games before suffering a season-ending injury. Cornerbacks Dominique Rodgers-Cromartie and Chris Harris Jr. led the secondary with three interceptions each.

=== Playoffs ===
Both the Seahawks and Broncos entered the postseason as the number one seed in their respective conferences, which meant they received byes through the first round of the playoffs.

The Seahawks' first playoff game was in the NFC divisional round, a rematch of Monday Night Football from Week 13, playing the New Orleans Saints at home. The Seahawks had a 16-point lead at halftime, but although the Saints were able to halve the deficit in the fourth quarter, they could not close the gap further before a botched play in the final seconds ended the game, with the Seahawks winning 23–15.

The Seahawks then played in the NFC Championship Game at home against the rival San Francisco 49ers; the two teams had each won once against the other during the regular season. Despite entering halftime with a seven-point deficit, the Seahawks took the lead in the fourth quarter thanks largely to Colin Kaepernick losing one fumble and throwing two interceptions. The second interception came in the final seconds of the game when Richard Sherman batted the ball into the arms of Malcolm Smith to seal the 23–17 win and send the Seahawks to their second Super Bowl in franchise history.

The Broncos faced the San Diego Chargers in the AFC divisional round. Although their record-breaking offense was held to an unusually low 24 points, the Broncos still emerged victorious, 24–17, having shut out the Chargers until the fourth quarter.

The AFC Championship Game once again pitted Peyton Manning and his Broncos against Tom Brady and the New England Patriots, the 15th matchup between the two veteran quarterbacks. The Broncos won 26–16 on the back of a 400-yard passing performance by Manning, which included two touchdown drives that lasted over seven minutes each, earning the Broncos their first Super Bowl berth since 1998.

=== Pre-game notes ===
As the Broncos were the designated home team in the annual rotation between AFC and NFC teams, they elected to wear their home uniform (orange jerseys with white pants) while the Seahawks wore a mixed uniform (white jerseys with navy blue pants, representing away and home, respectively). With the loss, the Broncos fell to 0–4 (outscored 167–38) in Super Bowls in which they wore orange jerseys, while with the Seahawks' win, the team wearing white had then won nine of the previous ten Super Bowls.

==== Team facilities ====
The Hyatt Regency in Jersey City served as the home for the Broncos during their stay. The team took up 150 of the 351 rooms until the night of January 29 before taking up the entire hotel. The team hosted the press conferences during the week on a cruise ship docked at the pier of the hotel. Meanwhile, the Seahawks took up 120 to 150 of 429-room Westin Hotel, also in Jersey City. The team retrofitted some rooms into training and massage rooms and occupied the pool. The City of Jersey City renamed its main boulevard, Columbus Drive, to Super Bowl Drive to welcome the teams, and the city and both hotels hired security to protect the teams from fans and other onlookers.

The Broncos utilized the New York Jets headquarters, Atlantic Health Jets Training Center in Florham Park, while the Seahawks utilized the New York Giants headquarters, Quest Diagnostics Training Center adjacent to MetLife Stadium.

==== Super Bowl week ====
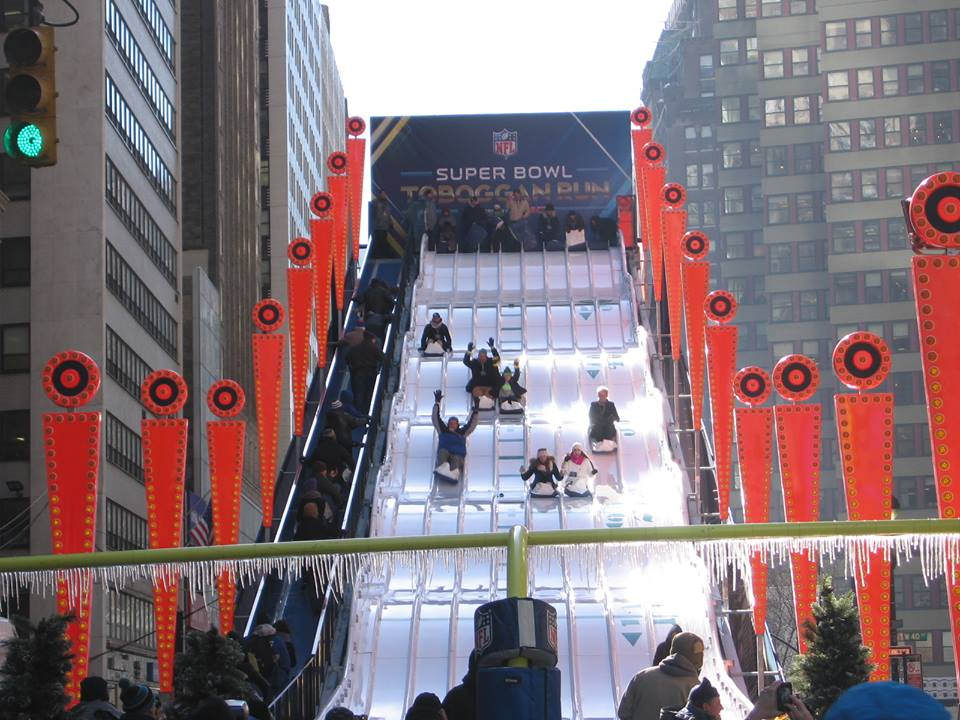
Toboggan run at Super Bowl Boulevard in Times Square

Since New York and New Jersey co-hosted the Super Bowl, pregame events took place in both states.

The "Super Bowl Kickoff Spectacular" concert was held on January 27 at Liberty State Park in Jersey City, headlined by Daughtry and featuring a fireworks show. Media Day took place on January 28 at the Prudential Center in Newark.

The NFL replaced its indoor NFL Experience fan attraction with an outdoor festival known as Super Bowl Boulevard, which was held along Broadway and Times Square in Manhattan from January 29 to February 1. The event featured various fan-oriented events and attractions, including an artificial toboggan hill. As the area was expected to see around 400,000 people, security was increased in the area. NFL On Location and an NFL Tailgate Party was held at the Meadowlands Sports Complex prior to the game.

== Broadcasting ==
=== Television ===
==== United States ====
Super Bowl XLVIII was televised by Fox in the United States, with Joe Buck calling play-by-play, Troy Aikman as color analyst, and Pam Oliver and Erin Andrews as sideline reporters. Fox planned to use multiple 4K resolution cameras to provide the ability to zoom closer into certain camera angles, and due to the expected possibility of cold weather, graphics developed by Autodesk would display simulations of wind patterns inside the stadium. Fox constructed an enclosed studio in Times Square for use as part of studio programming on Fox and Fox Sports 1 during the week of the game.

The broadcast attracted 111.5 million viewers, becoming the most-watched event in U.S. television history and surpassing the previous record of 111.3 million viewers who watched Super Bowl XLVI in 2012. The New Girl episode "Prince" and Brooklyn Nine-Nine episode "Operation: Broken Feather" were the lead-out programs.

For the first time in Super Bowl history, a dedicated Spanish language telecast of the game was broadcast in the United States. The broadcast was carried by sister cable network Fox Deportes as part of a larger package of marquee games simulcast by Fox, and featured commentary and surrounding coverage in that language. As with all NFL games, the Spanish play-by-play was also carried via Fox's SAP feed. John Laguna was the play-by-play announcer and Brady Poppinga was the color analyst. With 561,000 viewers, the Fox Deportes broadcast was the highest-rated U.S. Spanish-language cable telecast outside of soccer.

===== Advertising =====
Fox set the sales rate for a 30-second advertisement at US$4 million, matching the price set by CBS for Super Bowl XLVII. Fox began selling advertising for the game in May 2013 and announced it had sold out on December 4.

USA Today's Super Bowl Ad Meter named Budweiser's ad "Puppy Love" as the best of the game. Meanwhile, a Coca-Cola spot with people of diverse cultures singing "America the Beautiful" in various languages ignited controversy, with right wing political commentators such as Glenn Beck, Todd Starnes and Allen West condemning the ad for discouraging assimilation, while left wing commentators considered it a tribute to the idea of the United States as a multicultural society.

Paramount Pictures, Sony Pictures, Lionsgate, Warner Bros., Universal Studios and Walt Disney Studios paid for movie trailers to be aired during the Super Bowl. Following Monsters vs. Aliens' footsteps, Paramount paid for the debut trailers for Transformers: Age of Extinction and Noah, Sony paid for The Amazing Spider-Man 2, RoboCop, The Monuments Men, and Pompeii, Lionsgate paid for Draft Day, Warner Bros. paid for The Lego Movie, Universal paid for Neighbors, and Disney paid for Captain America: The Winter Soldier, Need for Speed, and Muppets Most Wanted.

==== International ====
NFL Network produced an international television feed of the game, with alternate English-language commentary provided by Bob Papa (play-by-play) and Charles Davis (color analyst).

Country/territory	Rights holder(s)
Arab world	OSN Sports
Australia	One (Live), Network Ten (replay) and ESPN
Austria	Puls 4
Belgium	Telenet
Brazil	ESPN Brasil, Esporte Interativo
Bulgaria	ESPN America, Fox International
Canada	CTV simulcast Fox's coverage, RDS
Croatia	Arenasport
Czech Republic; Hungary; Moldova; Romania; Slovakia	Sport 1
Denmark	TV3+
Finland	Nelonen Pro 1, Nelonen Pro 1 HD with Finnish commentary and Nelonen Pro 2, Nelonen Pro 2 HD with English commentary.
France	W9, BeIN Sport
Germany	SAT.1
Greece	Fox
Hong Kong	Now TV
Iceland	Stöð 2 Sport
Italy	Fox Sports 2 HD, Italia 1 HD
Israel	Fox Sports, Sport 5
Japan	NHK BS-1
Latin America	ESPN, Fox Sports
Mexico	Televisa, Fox Sports, TV Azteca, ESPN
Netherlands	Fox Sports (Netherlands)
New Zealand	Sky Television, Sommet Sports
Norway	Viasat 4, Viasat Sport
Philippines	TV5, AksyonTV
Poland	Polsat Sport
Portugal	Sport TV
Russia	NTV+
Serbia	Arena Sport
Spain	Canal+
Sweden	TV10
Switzerland	RTS Deux
Turkey	FOX Sports
UK; Ireland	Channel 4, Sky Sports

=== Streaming ===
For the third consecutive year, a webcast was provided for viewers. Fox streamed its coverage of the game online on PCs and tablets through its new TV Everywhere service Fox Sports Go. Although normally requiring a television subscription to use, Fox made the service available as a free preview for the Super Bowl. Due to contractual restrictions imposed by the NFL's exclusive digital and mobile content deals with Microsoft and Verizon Communications, Fox was unable to offer any additional camera angles or offer streaming on smartphones. Mobile streaming of the game was exclusive to the Verizon Wireless NFL Mobile service.

==== Social media ====
The social network Twitter estimated that Super Bowl XLVIII generated 24.9 million posts ("tweets") on the service (surpassing last year's total of 24.1), peaking at 381,605 tweets per-minute following Percy Harvin's kickoff return at the start of the second half (surpassing the 231,500 per-minute peak the previous year during the blackout). 57% of the ads broadcast during the game promoted an associated hashtag, up from 50% in 2013.

=== Radio ===
==== National coverage ====
The game was nationally broadcast on Westwood One radio, with Kevin Harlan as play-by-play announcer, Boomer Esiason as color analyst, and James Lofton and Mark Malone as sideline reporters. Jim Gray hosted the network's pregame, halftime and post-game coverage. Scott Graham, who hosted additional pregame coverage for Westwood One, also served as MetLife Stadium's public address system announcer for the game.

==== Local market coverage ====
The flagship stations of each station in the markets of each team carried their local play-by-play calls. In Seattle, KIRO-FM (97.3) and KIRO (710 AM) carried the "Seahawks Bing Radio Network" call with Steve Raible on play-by-play and Warren Moon with color commentary, while in Denver, the Broncos play-by-play from the "Denver Broncos Radio Network" aired on KOA (850 AM) and KRFX (103.5) with the play-by-play of Dave Logan and the color commentary of Ed McCaffrey. The Spanish-language partner of the Broncos, KJMN (92.1)/KMXA (1090) carried the game in that language for the Denver market. Sirius XM Radio carried the Westwood One and local team feeds over satellite radio, along with the call in eight other languages. Outside of those stations, all the other stations in the Seahawks and Broncos radio networks carried the Westwood One call per NFL rules. KOA and KIRO are both clear-channel stations, which allowed listeners throughout most of the western US to hear the portion of the contest which continued past sunset local time.

==== International radio coverage ====
Westwood One's coverage was simulcast on TSN Radio in Canada.

In the United Kingdom, Absolute Radio 90s carried the game for the first time, taking over rights from the BBC Radio 5 Sports Extra, who carried the contest for several years prior. The in-house Absolute Radio broadcast featured Darren Fletcher on color commentary (the same capacity in which he served with the BBC), Rocky Boiman with additional contributions and Will Gavin on play-by-play.

== Entertainment ==
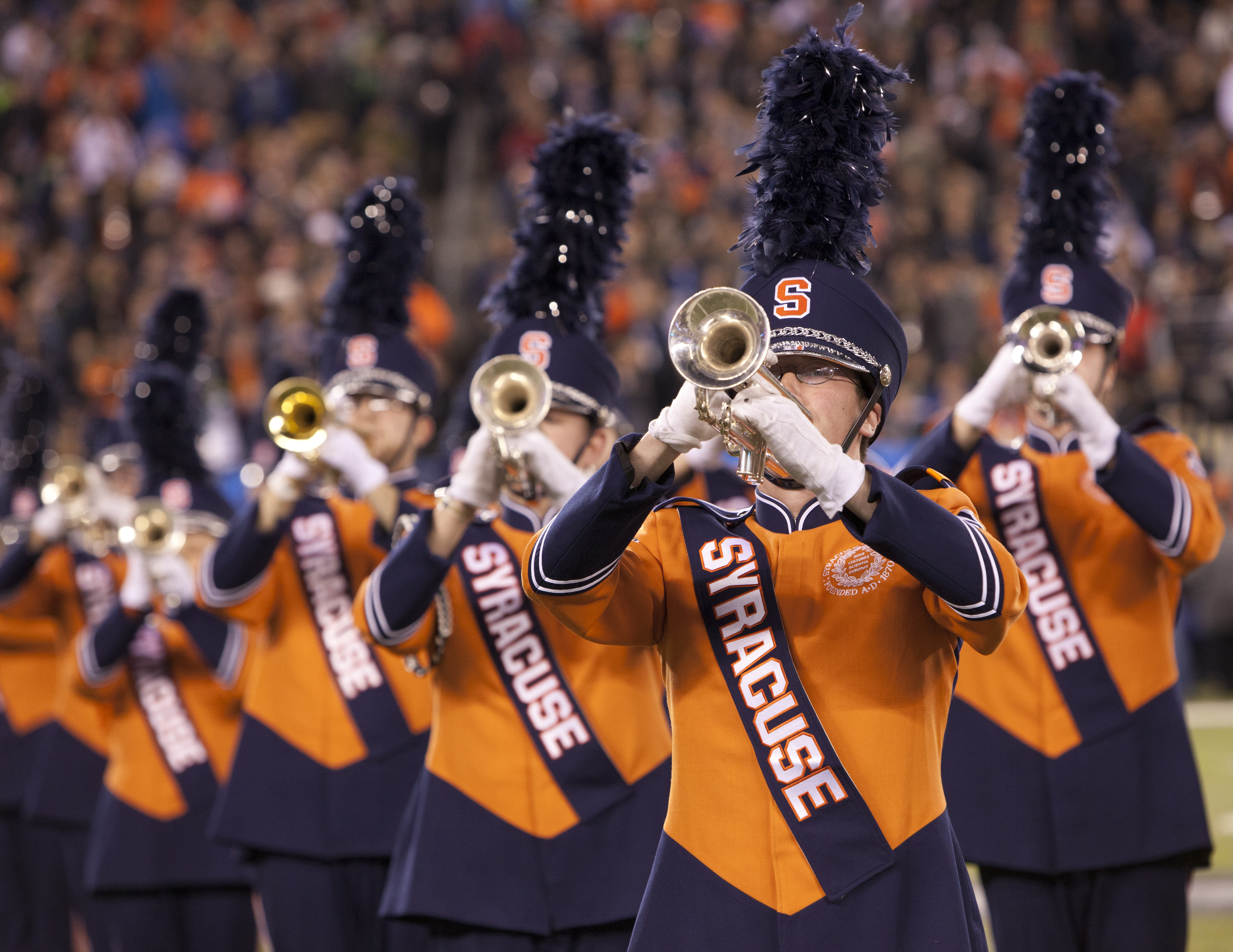
The Syracuse University Marching Band performing before Super Bowl XLVIII

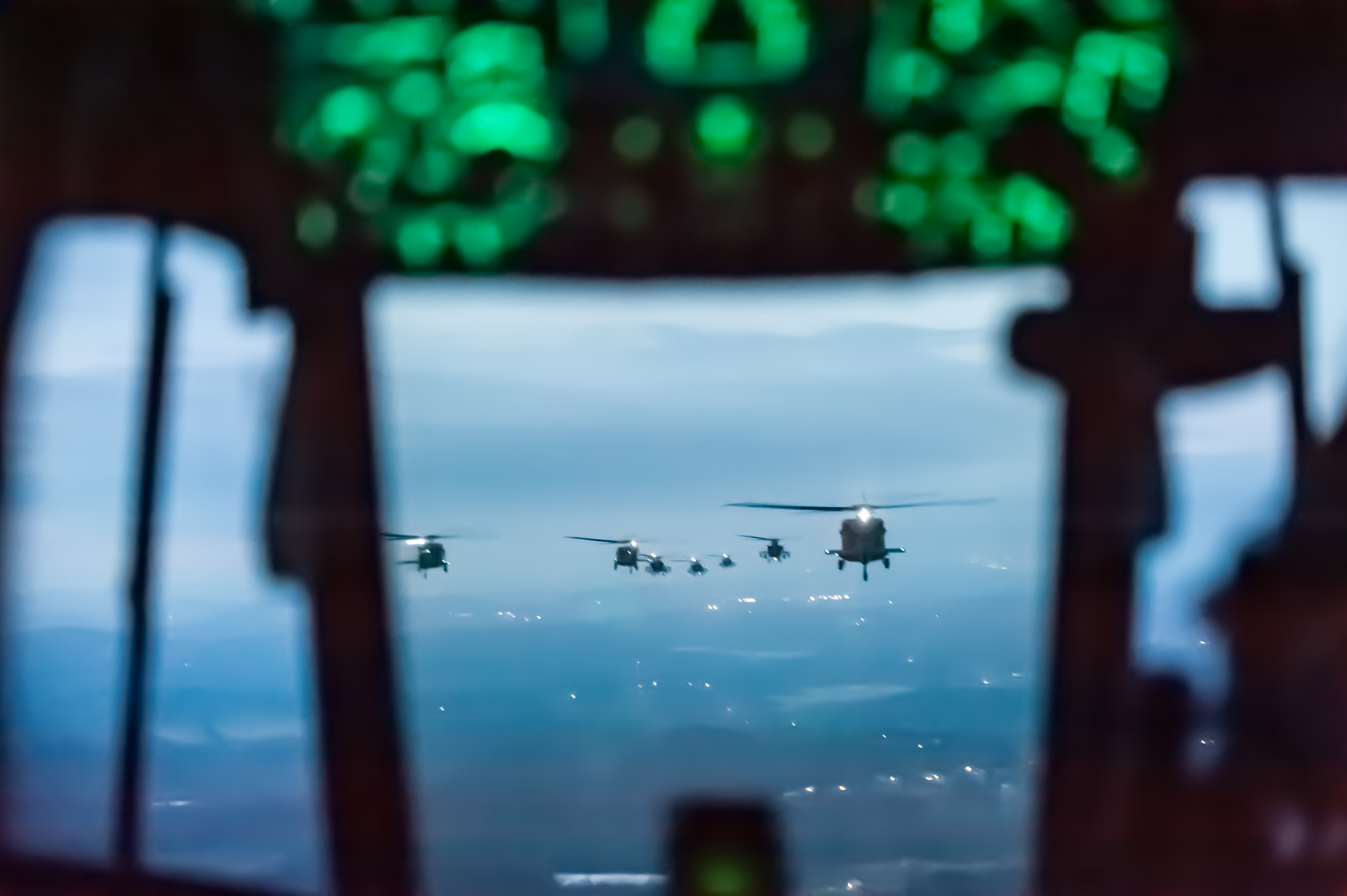
Pilots and air crews from 101st Combat Aviation Brigade, 101st Airborne Division (Air Assault), fly toward Met Life Stadium to conduct the Super Bowl flyover Feb. 2, 2014. (U.S. Army photo by Sgt. Duncan Brennan, 101st CAB Public Affairs)

=== Pregame ===
The pregame show began with the Rutgers Scarlet Knights Marching Band and Syracuse University Marching Band. Rapper, singer, actress, and New Jersey native Queen Latifah, joined by the New Jersey Youth Chorus, sang "America the Beautiful". "The Star-Spangled Banner" was then sung by Renée Fleming accompanied by the Armed Forces Chorus, the first (and, so far, only) opera singer ever to do so at a Super Bowl. A V-shaped formation of three United States Army UH-60M Black Hawk transport helicopters, three AH-64D Apache attack helicopters and three CH-47F Chinook heavy-lifters did a military flyover timed with the last note of the song.

=== Halftime show ===
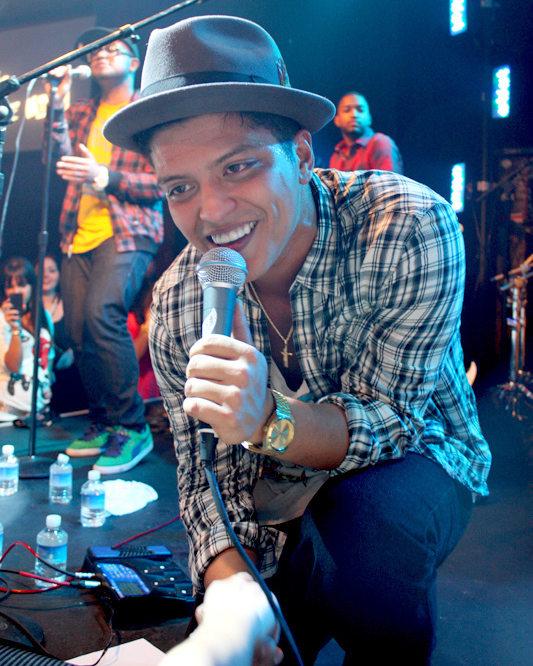
Bruno Mars headlined the halftime show.

On September 8, 2013, the league announced that Bruno Mars would perform at halftime. On January 10, 2014, it was announced that Red Hot Chili Peppers would be joining Mars as halftime show performers. The show opened with a children's choir singing a chorus from "Billionaire". Afterward, Mars appeared, playing a drum solo. Mars then performed the songs "Locked Out of Heaven", "Treasure", "Runaway Baby", "Give It Away" (with Red Hot Chili Peppers) and "Just the Way You Are" as a tribute to the United States Armed Forces. The halftime performance was the most watched in the history of the Super Bowl drawing in a record 115.3 million viewers, surpassing the record 114 million who watched Madonna perform two years earlier. It was later revealed that the music was pre-recorded. Red Hot Chili Pepper's drummer, Chad Smith responded on Twitter by saying "FYI... Every band in the last 10 years at the Super Bowl has performed to a previously recorded track. It's the NFL's policy."

Planners initially indicated there would not be a halftime show at all due to the possibility of poor weather conditions. One such logistical problem would be assembling and disassembling the halftime show stage during a blizzard. However, the league went ahead anyways. According to Mike Florio of Profootballtalk.com, the NFL wanted to avoid a repeat of Super Bowl XXVI when Fox counter-programmed a special live episode of In Living Color. Fox had not yet become a television partner with the NFL and saw an opportunity to pull young audiences away from a halftime show that lacked big-name performers. As a result of Fox's ratings success, the league brought Michael Jackson to perform during the following season's Super Bowl XXVII, and since then the league has continued to book big-name talent to hold the television audience.

Touchdown Entertainment, the company that produced the event, incorporated the live audience into the show and transformed the crowd into "the largest ever LED screen". During the show, spectators put on a black knitted hat called a "video ski hat" with 3 embedded LEDs that lit up on command. The hats transformed the audience into an enormous human video screen made up of over 80,000 pixels. Images including the Pepsi logo flashed across the crowd, as well as video of the live Red Hot Chili Peppers performance and fireworks display.

Thanks to this technology, each spectator was integrated to the show and the Super Bowl Halftime claimed to feature the largest-ever human video screen. In an original idea by Nuno Lopes, the company that invented and provided the crowd activation technology is the Montreal-based company PixMob.

== Game summary ==
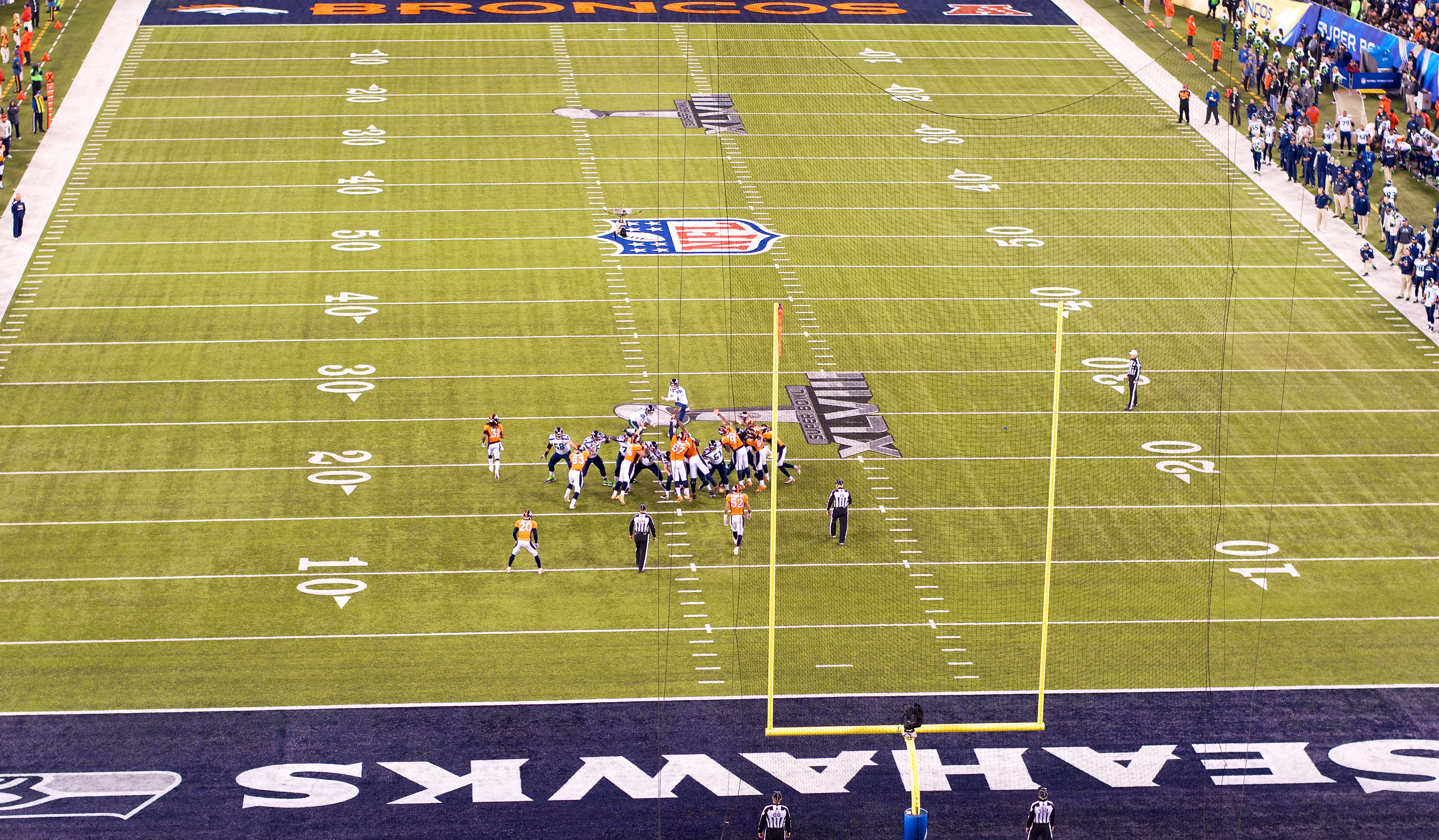
Seahawks kicker Stephen Hauschka kicked two field goals during the game, including this effort from 33 yards.

The game kicked off at 6:32 p.m. EST (UTC−05:00).

=== First half ===
The Seahawks took control of the game right from the start. On the Broncos' first play after receiving the opening kickoff, center Manny Ramirez snapped the ball while quarterback Peyton Manning was shifting forward from shotgun formation in the process of calling an audible, resulting in the ball going past Manning into the end zone. Running back Knowshon Moreno recovered the ball to prevent a Seahawks touchdown, but he was downed by defensive end Cliff Avril in the end zone for a safety to give the Seahawks an immediate 2–0 lead. Avril's safety just 12 seconds into the game was the quickest score to start a game in Super Bowl history, surpassing the kickoff return by Devin Hester to start Super Bowl XLI seven years earlier. It also marked the third consecutive Super Bowl in which a safety was scored; the previous two times were when Tom Brady was flagged for intentional grounding in the end zone in Super Bowl XLVI and when Sam Koch gave up an intentional safety in the closing seconds of Super Bowl XLVII. Following the free kick, wide receiver Percy Harvin gained 30 yards on an end around run, then quarterback Russell Wilson completed back-to-back passes to wide receiver Jermaine Kearse for 18 yards to set up kicker Stephen Hauschka's 31-yard field goal, making the score 5–0. The Broncos were forced to a three-and-out on their next drive, and on the Seahawks' next drive, Wilson completed a 37-yard pass to wide receiver Doug Baldwin, leading to another Hauschka field goal, a 33-yarder, that increased the Seahawks' lead to 8–0. On the third play of the Broncos' ensuing possession, Manning was intercepted by safety Kam Chancellor, giving the Seahawks the ball on the Broncos' 37-yard line.

Aided by a 15-yard run from Harvin on the first play, the Seahawks quickly got the ball into the red zone going into the second quarter. The Broncos' defense eventually managed to force an incomplete pass on third down, but cornerback Tony Carter was flagged for pass interference in the end zone, giving the Seahawks a new set of downs at the 1-yard line. Two plays later, running back Marshawn Lynch crashed into the end zone, hitting the line so effectively that he ended the play standing up, scoring on a 1-yard touchdown run and increasing the lead to 15–0. The Seahawks, in addition to a safety, became the fifth team in Super Bowl history to score on its first three offensive possessions (the others came in II, XXIX, XXX and XXXII).

The Broncos' offense finally managed to get moving on their next possession, with Manning completing five passes to wide receiver Demaryius Thomas for 26 yards and a 16-yard pass to wide receiver Wes Welker to advance the ball to the Seahawks' 35-yard line. But when they got there, Manning was hit by Avril as he tried to throw a pass to Moreno, causing a high short floater that was intercepted and returned 69 yards for a touchdown by linebacker Malcolm Smith, increasing the Seahawks' lead to 22–0. During the kickoff, the Broncos appeared to turn the ball over yet again when wide receiver Trindon Holliday fumbled the ball while being tackled by safety Chris Maragos, with Hauschka making the recovery for the Seahawks. However, instant replay determined that Holliday was down by contact before he lost the ball, so the Broncos retained possession on their own 33-yard line. The Broncos then mounted a drive to the Seahawks' 19-yard line, aided by Thomas' 19-yard reception on 3rd-and-5. With just over a minute left in the half, the Broncos faced 4th-and-2. Instead of kicking a field goal, they tried to pick up a first down, but Manning's pass was incomplete, and the Broncos remained scoreless at the end of the half. The 22-point deficit was the largest faced by the Broncos all season. It was also the fourth-largest halftime deficit in Super Bowl history; the previous two were also against the Broncos – the Washington Redskins led the Broncos 35–10 in Super Bowl XXII and the San Francisco 49ers led the Broncos 27–3 in Super Bowl XXIV. The Seahawks' 22–0 shutout lead at the half also broke the previous record of 20–0 set by the San Francisco 49ers in Super Bowl XVI over the Cincinnati Bengals, but was later broken by the Philadelphia Eagles' 24–0 halftime lead over the Kansas City Chiefs in Super Bowl LIX.

=== Second half ===
In order to avoid a big kickoff return, Matt Prater kicked the second half kickoff short, hitting the ground at the Seahawks' 12-yard line. But the plan backfired when Harvin picked the ball out of the air and took off for an 87-yard touchdown return (his only touchdown of the season) that increased the Seahawks' lead to 29–0. The touchdown took place 12 seconds into the second half, exactly the same amount of time that the Seahawks took to score the safety in the first half. It was also the first time that consecutive Super Bowls had kickoff returns for touchdowns; Jacoby Jones' return in Super Bowl XLVII being the previous one, which was also the second-half opening kickoff. After an exchange of punts, wide receiver Eric Decker gave the Broncos good field position with a 9-yard return to his own 45. Two plays later, Manning completed a 23-yard pass to Thomas, but cornerback Byron Maxwell knocked the ball out of his hands and Smith recovered it, returning the ball 7 yards. An unnecessary roughness penalty against Broncos offensive tackle Orlando Franklin added 15 more yards onto the end of the play, giving the Seahawks the ball at the Broncos' 42-yard line. Three plays later, Wilson hit tight end Luke Willson for a 12-yard completion on 3rd-and-7 and later completed a 19-yard pass to wide receiver Ricardo Lockette. On the next play, he threw a short pass to Kearse, who broke four tackles as he took off for a 23-yard touchdown reception, giving the Seahawks a 36–0 lead.

The Broncos finally got on the board on their next drive, advancing the ball 80 yards in seven plays, which featured a 20-yard pass interference penalty against Maxwell on 3rd-and-9, an 11-yard reception by tight end Jacob Tamme, and three catches by Welker for 37 yards. The drive and third quarter ended with Manning's 14-yard touchdown pass to Thomas, followed by a catch for a successful two-point conversion by Welker, cutting the Broncos' deficit to 36–8.

However, any momentum the Broncos might have gained was quickly snuffed out as Seahawks tight end Zach Miller recovered Prater's onside kick attempt on his own 48-yard line. He also caught a 10-yard reception from Wilson as the Seahawks subsequently drove 52 yards, also featuring a 24-yard reception by Kearse, and scored on a 10-yard touchdown pass from Wilson to Baldwin that capped off the scoring at 43–8 with over 11 minutes left in the game. The Broncos' last three drives resulted in a turnover on downs, a Manning fumble on fourth down that was forced by defensive end Chris Clemons (the only sack of the game for either team), and a drive to their own 46-yard line before the game ended.

=== Game statistics and notes ===
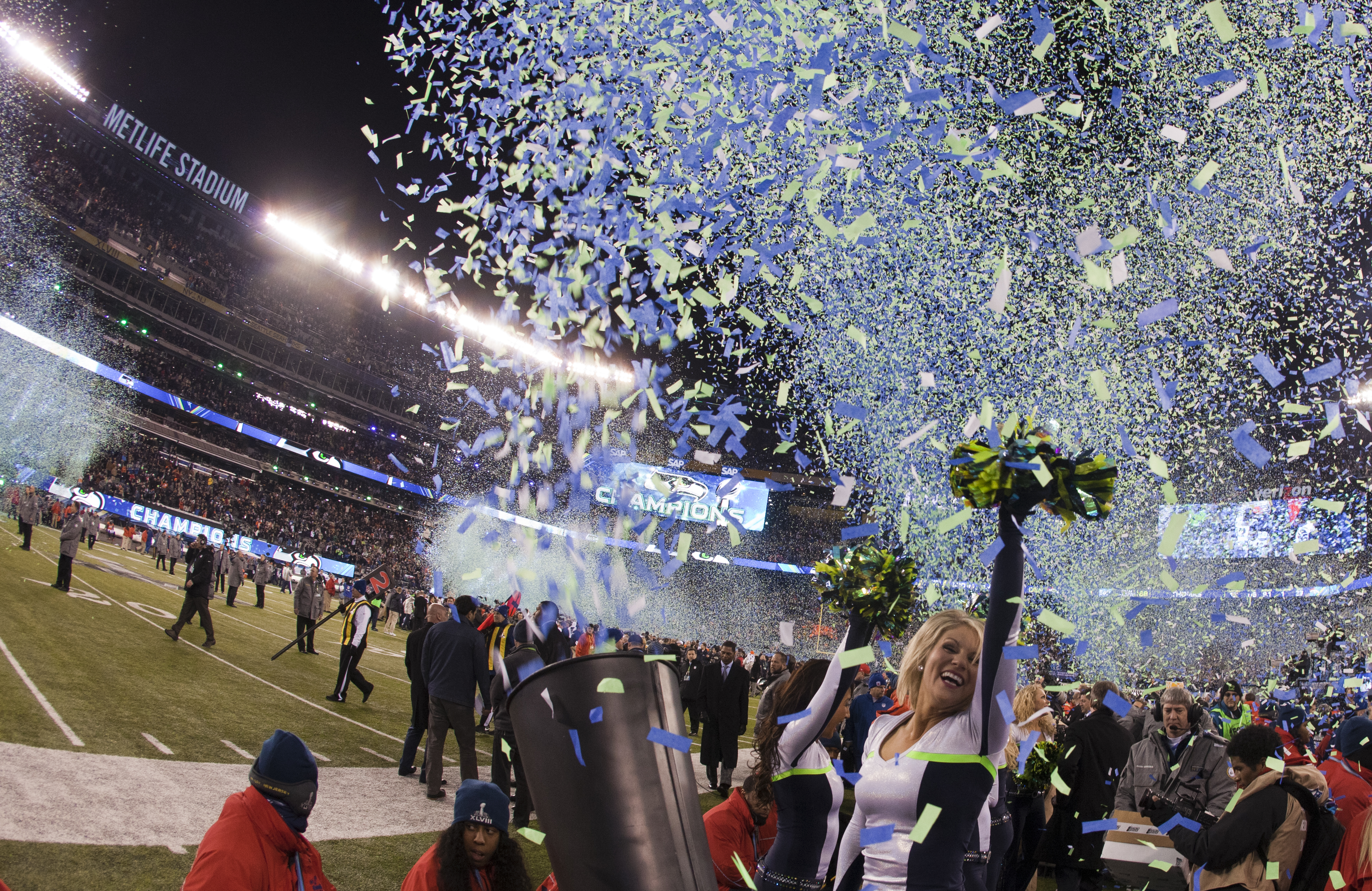
The Seattle Seahawks celebrate their Super Bowl XLVIII victory.

Wilson finished the game 18 of 25 for 206 yards and two touchdowns. Baldwin was his top receiver with five catches for 66 yards and a score, while Kearse added four catches for 65 and a touchdown. In addition to his 87-yard kickoff return touchdown, Harvin was the Seahawks leading rusher with 45 yards, even though he only carried the ball twice. Chancellor had nine tackles and an interception. Manning completed 34 of 49 passes for 280 yards and a touchdown, with two interceptions. His top target was Demaryius Thomas, who caught 13 passes (a Super Bowl record) for 118 yards and a touchdown. Welker added eight receptions for 84 yards. Linebacker Danny Trevathan had 12 tackles. Moreno was the Broncos' leading rusher, but with just 17 yards. Overall, the Broncos' record-setting offense gained only 306 yards, with just 27 yards on the ground.

Seahawks' linebacker Malcolm Smith received the Super Bowl Most Valuable Player Award. Denver fell to 2–5 in Super Bowls, while five-time league MVP Manning dropped to 11–12 in the playoffs and 1–2 in the Super Bowl. Including the Broncos' loss, none of the eight highest-scoring teams in league history won a Super Bowl in the same season and all four teams who entered the championship with the league's leading passer lost the game. Manning's 34 completions and Demaryius Thomas' 13 receptions were both Super Bowl records.

With touchdowns scored on offense, defense and special teams, the Seahawks became the first team since the Baltimore Ravens in Super Bowl XXXV to do so. Teams with an interception return for a touchdown also stayed perfect, improving to 12–0 in Super Bowls. As a result of scoring their safety 12 seconds into the game and subsequently never relinquishing the lead for the rest of the game, the Seahawks set a Super Bowl record for holding a lead continuously for the longest time (59:48). The Broncos became only the second team in the past 30 years to score fewer than 10 points during the course of the game.

This was the first time that any NFL game ended with a 43–8 final score, a phenomenon known as scorigami. It is one of three Super Bowls, alongside XXI and XXIV, coincidentally involving the Broncos, where such a phenomenon has occurred.

Following on from his two national championships at USC, Seahawks head coach Pete Carroll became just the third head coach to win both an NCAA Division 1-A/FBS national championship and a Super Bowl after Jimmy Johnson (Miami and Dallas) and Barry Switzer (Oklahoma and Dallas).

=== Box score ===
Super Bowl XLVIII: Seattle Seahawks 43, Denver Broncos 8

Quarter	1	2	3	4	Total
Seahawks (NFC)	8	14	14	7	43
Broncos (AFC)	0	0	8	0	8

at MetLife Stadium, East Rutherford, New Jersey

- Date: February 2, 2014
- Game time: 6:32 p.m. EST
- Game weather: Partly cloudy, 49 °F (9 °C)
- Game attendance: 82,529
- Referee: Terry McAulay
- TV announcers (Fox): Joe Buck, Troy Aikman, Pam Oliver, Erin Andrews
- Super Bowl Gamebook

Scoring summary

Quarter	Time	Drive			Team	Scoring information	Score	
Quarter	Time	Plays	Yards	TOP	Team	Scoring information	SEA	DEN
1	14:48	—	—	—	SEA	−14-yard fumble, Knowshon Moreno tackled in the end zone by Cliff Avril for a safety	2	0
1	10:21	9	51	4:27	SEA	31-yard field goal by Stephen Hauschka	5	0
1	2:16	13	58	6:15	SEA	33-yard field goal by Hauschka	8	0
2	12:00	7	37	3:59	SEA	Marshawn Lynch 1-yard touchdown run, Hauschka kick good	15	0
2	3:21	—	—	—	SEA	Interception returned 69 yards for touchdown by Malcolm Smith, Hauschka kick good	22	0
3	14:48	—	—	—	SEA	Percy Harvin 87-yard kickoff return for a touchdown, Hauschka kick good	29	0
3	2:58	6	58	2:57	SEA	Jermaine Kearse 23-yard touchdown reception from Russell Wilson, Hauschka kick good	36	0
3	0:00	6	80	2:58	DEN	Demaryius Thomas 14-yard touchdown reception from Peyton Manning, 2-point pass good (Manning to Wes Welker)	36	8
4	11:45	5	48	3:15	SEA	Doug Baldwin 10-yard touchdown reception from Wilson, Hauschka kick good	43	8
"TOP" = time of possession. For other American football terms, see Glossary of American football.							43	8

== Final statistics ==
Sources: NFL.com Super Bowl XLVIII, The Football Database Super Bowl XLVIII

=== Statistical comparison ===
Statistic	Seattle Seahawks	Denver Broncos
First downs	17	18
First downs rushing	6	2
First downs passing	10	13
First downs penalty	1	3
Third down efficiency	7/12	6/13
Fourth down efficiency	0/2	0/3
Total net yards	341	306
Net yards rushing	135	27
Rushing attempts	29	14
Yards per rush	4.7	1.9
Net yards passing	206	279
Passing – completions/attempts	18/26	34/49
Times sacked-total yards	0–0	1–1
Interceptions thrown	0	2
Punt returns-total yards	0–0	1–9
Kickoff returns-total yards	2–107	5–105
Interceptions-total return yards	2–71	0–0
Punts-average yardage	1–45.0	2–30.0
Fumbles-lost	0–0	4–2
Penalties-yards	10–104	5–44
Time of possession	31:53	28:07
Turnovers	0	4

Records set
Fastest score to open game	12 seconds	Seattle, safety
Most receptions, game	13	Demaryius Thomas (Denver)
Most pass completions, game	34	Peyton Manning (Denver)
Most losses, team	5	Denver
Largest halftime lead with a shutout	22–0	Seattle
Records tied
Most safeties, game	1	Cliff Avril (Seattle)
Most touchdowns, kickoff returns, game	1	Percy Harvin (Seattle)
Most 2-point conversions, game	1	Wes Welker (Denver)
Fewest punts, team, game	1	Seattle
Fewest rushing touchdowns, team, game	0	Denver
Fewest fumbles, team, game	0	Seattle

=== Individual statistics ===
Seahawks passing
	C/ATT^{1}	Yds	TD	INT	Rating
Russell Wilson	18/25	206	2	0	123.1
Tarvaris Jackson	0/1	0	0	0	39.6
Seahawks rushing
	Car^{2}	Yds	TD	LG^{3}	Yds/Car
Percy Harvin	2	45	0	30	22.50
Marshawn Lynch	15	39	1	18	2.60
Russell Wilson	3	26	0	16	8.67
Robert Turbin	9	25	0	6	2.78
Seahawks receiving
	Rec^{4}	Yds	TD	LG^{3}	Target^{5}
Doug Baldwin	5	66	1	37	5
Jermaine Kearse	4	65	1	23	5
Golden Tate	3	17	0	9	4
Luke Willson	2	17	0	12	4
Ricardo Lockette	1	19	0	19	2
Zach Miller	1	10	0	10	2
Michael Robinson	1	7	0	7	1
Percy Harvin	1	5	0	5	2
Robert Turbin	0	0	0	0	1

Broncos passing
	C/ATT^{1}	Yds	TD	INT	Rating
Peyton Manning	34/49	280	1	2	73.5
Broncos rushing
	Car^{2}	Yds	TD	LG^{3}	Yds/Car
Knowshon Moreno	5	17	0	9	3.40
C. J. Anderson	2	9	0	6	4.50
Montee Ball	6	1	0	3	0.17
Peyton Manning	1	0	0	0	0.00
Broncos receiving
	Rec^{4}	Yds	TD	LG^{3}	Target^{5}
Demaryius Thomas	13	118	1	23	18
Wes Welker	8	84	0	22	10
Julius Thomas	4	27	0	11	6
Knowshon Moreno	3	20	0	7	4
Jacob Tamme	2	9	0	11	2
Montee Ball	2	2	0	1	3
C. J. Anderson	1	14	0	14	1
Eric Decker	1	6	0	6	5

^{1}Completions/attempts ^{2}Carries ^{3}Long gain ^{4}Receptions ^{5}Times targeted

== Starting lineups ==
Hall of Fame‡

Seattle	Position	Position	Denver
Offense
Doug Baldwin	WR		Demaryius Thomas
Russell Okung	LT		Chris Clark
James Carpenter	LG		Zane Beadles
Max Unger	C		Manny Ramirez
J. R. Sweezy	RG		Louis Vasquez
Breno Giacomini	RT		Orlando Franklin
Alvin Bailey	T	WR	Eric Decker
Zach Miller	TE		Julius Thomas
Golden Tate	WR		Wes Welker
Russell Wilson	QB		Peyton Manning‡
Marshawn Lynch	RB		Knowshon Moreno
Defense
Cliff Avril	LDE		Malik Jackson
Michael Bennett	LDT	DT	Sylvester Williams
Clinton McDonald	RDT	NT	Terrance Knighton
Chris Clemons	RDE		Shaun Phillips
K. J. Wright	OLB	SLB	Nate Irving
Bobby Wagner	MLB		Paris Lenon
Walter Thurmond	CB	WLB	Danny Trevathan
Richard Sherman	LCB		Champ Bailey‡
Byron Maxwell	RCB		Dominique; Rodgers-Cromartie
Kam Chancellor	SS		Duke Ihenacho
Earl Thomas	FS		Mike Adams

== Mass Transit Super Bowl ==
Organizers dubbed Super Bowl XLVIII the "Mass Transit Super Bowl", emphasizing and encouraging game attendees and other visitors to use public transportation to get to the game and other festivities throughout the region. The host committee in conjunction with other metropolitan transit agencies, such as NJ Transit, the lead agency, and the Port Authority of New York and New Jersey and Metropolitan Transportation Authority developed special services, fares, schedules and maps to promote the use of metro area's trains, subways, light rail and buses during Super Bowl Week. The plan was a failure that led to universal criticism by fans and writers who attended the game due to poor execution and overcrowding, particularly involving fans getting stuck in the stadium, indefinitely, postgame, while awaiting the dwindling of the initial crowds of riders. As of September 2018, the diagram is still updated online.

== Security and safety ==
The Super Bowl was considered a level one national security event. To that end, the New Jersey State Police and the NFL host committee installed a 2.5-mile (4.0 km) chain-link perimeter fence around the Meadowlands Sports Complex, which is located at the intersection of a number of highways. Security planners stated that access to the area would be strictly limited and regulated. To that end, parking spaces were greatly reduced, tailgate parties restricted and walking to the venue strictly prohibited. Taxis and limousines were not permitted to drop off passengers. Passengers for trains to the stadium were limited in what they could carry and were screened before boarding.

The area was patrolled on land, by air and by water since it is surrounded by wetlands. More than 3,000 security guards and 700 police officers were on duty on game day. In addition, SWAT teams and snipers were located throughout the stadium. There was a no-fly zone and fighter jets patrolled the region. The security effort was overseen by a joint operations center a few miles away from MetLife Stadium, which was staffed by hundreds of people from 35 different agencies ranging from the CIA to the New Jersey Transit Police.

In February 2013, controversy arose as mayors of five local municipalities said they would not provide emergency services, stating they have been poorly compensated for past stadium events. One of the mayors, William J. Roseman of Carlstadt, New Jersey, stated: "The teams don't care about budget caps and what the impacts are on the taxpayers of Carlstadt. I had to cut back my police department budget by a total of a million dollars over the last several years. While we are forced to lay off police officers, the owners of the Jets and Giants are filling their pockets at taxpayers' expense."

During the postgame news conference with Super Bowl MVP Malcolm Smith, a man jumped onto the podium, grabbed the microphone there, and, referencing one common conspiracy theory, stated the following: "Investigate 9/11. 9/11 was perpetrated by people within our own government." Smith did not react hastily, but was rather confused, and continued onward with answering questions from the media. The man quickly walked away, but security closed in, and he was arrested for trespassing.

== Officials ==
Super Bowl XLVIII had seven officials. The numbers in parentheses below indicate their uniform numbers.

- Referee – Terry McAulay (77)
- Umpire – Carl Paganelli (124)
- Head linesman – Jim Mello (48)
- Line judge – Tom Symonette (100)
- Field judge – Scott Steenson (88)
- Side judge – Dave Wyant (16)
- Back judge – Steve Freeman (133)
- Replay official – Earnie Frantz
- Replay assistant - Brian Matoren
- Alternate referee - Clete Blakeman (34)
- Alternate umpire - Paul King (121)
- Alternate wing - Greg Bradley (98)
- Alternate deep - James Coleman (95)
- Alternate back judge - Terrence Miles (111)

== See also ==
- Broncos–Seahawks rivalry
- List of Super Bowl champions
- Sports in New York City
- Sports in Newark, New Jersey
