= Royal Brougham =

Sports writer and philanthropist

- Born: September 17, 1894; St. Louis, Missouri, US
- Died: October 30, 1978 (aged 84); Seattle, Washington, US
- Education: Franklin High School (dropped out, age 16)
- Occupations: Seattle Post-Intelligencer sports editor; philanthropist
- Years active: 1910 – 1978
- Spouse: Alice Brougham
- Children: 1 daughter

Royal Brewer Brougham (September 17, 1894 – October 30, 1978) was one of the longest tenured employees of a U.S. newspaper in history, working for the Seattle Post-Intelligencer in Seattle, Washington, primarily as sports editor, for 68 years, starting at age 16.

Born in St. Louis, Missouri, Brougham moved to Seattle as a youngster with his family. He was a highly regarded Seattle citizen who befriended athletes such as Jack Dempsey and Babe Ruth and movie stars like Bing Crosby. At age 74, he stepped down as sports editor in 1968, succeeded by John Owen, but continued to write for the P-I for ten more years.

== Death ==
Midway through the Seattle Seahawks' third season in 1978, Brougham was still on the job at age 84, in the Kingdome press box during a game against division rival Denver on October 29. In the closing minutes, he suffered a major heart attack and was rushed to Swedish Hospital, where he died shortly after 1 am. His funeral in Seattle that Friday was attended by nearly five hundred.

== Legacy ==
Brougham was a devout Christian and philanthropist. The Royal Brougham Sports Pavilion at Seattle Pacific University and South Royal Brougham Way (formerly known as South Connecticut Street, bordering both T-Mobile Park and Lumen Field) in Seattle commemorate his legacy to the community.

The Emerald City Supporters, a supporter group for the Seattle Sounders FC soccer team, have nicknamed the team's home stadium "Royal Brougham Park" in honor of the sportswriter. The supporters' section behind the southern goal, closest to S. Royal Brougham Way, is known as the "Brougham End". Two of these supporters' groups take his name: The Brougham Boys '74 are an invite-only Ultras group affiliated with the ECS, as are the Royal Femmes for Women.

Chris Diamantopoulos portrayed Brougham in the 2023 film The Boys in the Boat.
