= Broncos–Seahawks rivalry =

National Football League rivalry

- Denver Broncos Seattle Seahawks
- Location: Denver, Seattle
- First meeting: October 2, 1977; Broncos 24, Seahawks 13
- Latest meeting: October 15, 2026; Broncos 17, Seahawks 14
- Next meeting: TBD
- Stadiums: Broncos: Empower Field at Mile High; Seahawks: Lumen Field

Statistics
- Total meetings: 59
- All-time series: Broncos: 36–23
- Regular season series: Broncos: 36–21
- Postseason results: Seahawks: 2–0
- Largest victory: Broncos: 41–14 (1989), 34–7 (1996); Seahawks: 43–8 (2013)
- Most points scored: Broncos: 41 (1989); Seahawks: 43 (2013)
- Longest win streak: Broncos: 6 (1996–1998); Seahawks: 3 (1982–1983, 1987–1988)
- Current win streak: Broncos: 1 (2026–present)

Post-season history
- 1983 AFC Wild Card: Seahawks won: 31–7; Super Bowl XLVIII: Seahawks won: 43–8

The Broncos–Seahawks rivalry is an American football rivalry in the National Football League (NFL) between the Denver Broncos and the Seattle Seahawks. The teams were AFC West divisional rivals from 1977 until 2001, after which the Seahawks moved to the NFC West. The Broncos lead the series 36–23. The teams have met twice in the playoffs, most notably the 43–8 Seahawks victory in Super Bowl XLVIII.

== Notable events ==
=== 1983 AFC wild card game ===
The Seattle Seahawks first post-season appearance came in 1983, with the Denver Broncos as their opponent in the AFC Wild Card game. They met on Christmas Eve at the Kingdome, where the Seahawks won 31–7 and notched their first playoff victory.

=== Bosworth / Elway feud ===
Outspoken linebacker Brian Bosworth was selected by the Seahawks in the 1987 NFL draft. "The Boz" spent the weeks leading up to his first game, a week-one matchup at Denver, trash-talking the Broncos and their star quarterback John Elway. Bosworth's quote "I can’t wait to get my hands on John Elway’s boyish face" riled up the Denver fanbase, as did his nickname of "Mr. Ed" for the QB. After losing the game, the industrious Bosworth claimed that the anti-Boz t-shirts that many Denver fans wore to the game were secretly produced and sold by his own company. When Bosworth was waived by the Seahawks in 1990, Elway shed no tears and predicted the linebacker's nascent acting career would be a flop. Elway would later refer to his rivalry with the Seahawks as "a great rivalry."

=== Harden / Largent hits ===
In Week 1 of the 1988 season, future Pro Football Hall of Fame Seahawks wide receiver Steve Largent was knocked out cold by Denver safety Mike Harden. Largent suffered a concussion and lost two teeth from the brutal forearm hit; no penalty was called on the field, but Harden was subsequently fined $5,000 by the league.

Later that season, Largent got revenge. In their Week 15 rematch Seahawks quarterback Dave Krieg was intercepted by Harden on an intended pass to Brian Blades. Largent followed the play out of the opposite corner of the endzone and put a huge blindside hit on Harden during the return. The hit knocked out the ball and Largent recovered the fumble himself. After Largent's payback, the original interception was nullified by a defensive holding penalty.

=== Super Bowl XLVIII ===
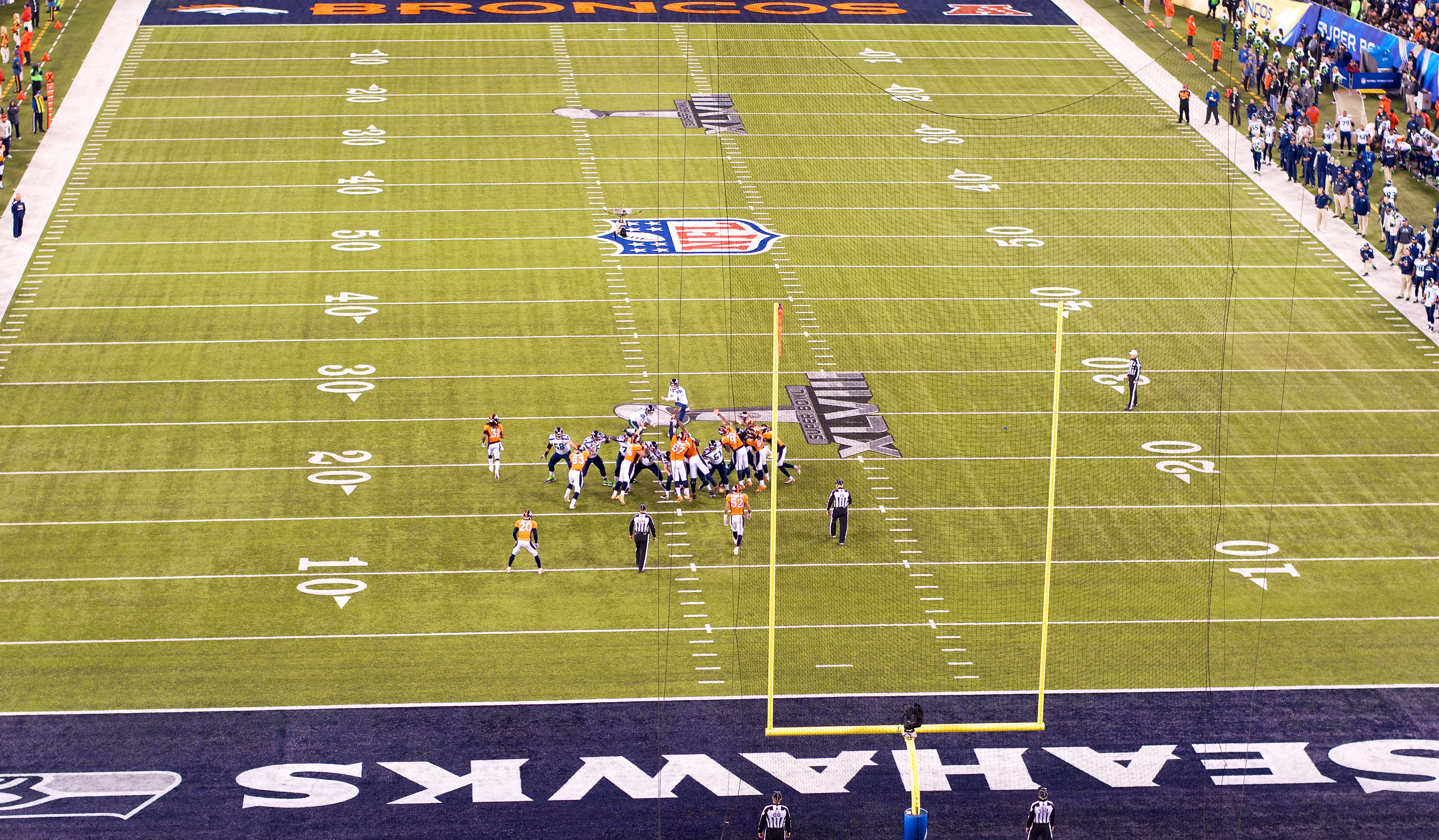
Seattle Seahawks kicker Stephen Hauschka kicking a field goal during Super Bowl XLVIII vs. the Denver Broncos.

On February 2, 2014, the AFC Champion Denver Broncos met the NFC Champion Seattle Seahawks in Super Bowl XLVIII to decide the 2013 NFL season.

The Broncos had the best offense that season (statistically the best offense of all time), and the Seahawks had the best defense of that season.

This Super Bowl was a matchup between former AFC West adversaries, a fact that was immediately noticed by local media in the run-up to the big game. The postseason finale reignited the rivalry that had been mostly dormant for the past decade, the teams having met only 3 times since the Seahawks moved to the NFC West for the 2002 season.

On the first play of the game, the Seahawks recorded the fastest score of Super Bowl history, scoring a safety off a botched snap to Peyton Manning, 12 seconds into the first quarter.

The Seahawks defense prevailed against the Bronco offense, as Seattle went on to beat Denver 43–8.

The two teams would meet again the following season, which concluded with the Seahawks defeating the Broncos 26–20 in overtime.

=== Russell Wilson trade ===
In 2022, Seattle traded franchise quarterback Russell Wilson to Denver after 10 years with the team. In return, the Seahawks received two first-round picks, two second-round picks, a fifth-round pick, quarterback Drew Lock, defensive lineman Shelby Harris, and tight end Noah Fant. Wilson won Super Bowl XLVIII with the Seahawks, beating the Broncos 43–8.

Wilson would make his Broncos debut on Monday Night Football against the Seahawks in his return to Seattle. In a tightly contested game, the Seahawks defeated the Broncos 17-16 after kicker Brandon McManus missed a 64-yard field goal late in the fourth quarter, allowing the Seahawks to run out the clock and win the game. Following the game, Broncos rookie head coach Nathaniel Hackett came under intense scrutiny for his poor in-game decisions, especially his decision to let McManus attempt the field goal instead of keeping the ball in Wilson's hands on a makeable 4th and 5.

Denver ultimately failed to meet their lofty expectations for the season, as poor play by Wilson and the offense led to the Broncos going 5–12, finishing in last place in the AFC West despite boasting a defense that was among the league's elite. After stumbling to a 4–11 record through 15 games, Hackett was fired, with many analysts and observers arguing that Hackett's coaching was a major reason for Denver's woeful underperformance and Wilson's decline. To make matters worse, Denver would have had the fifth pick of the 2023 NFL draft, but it went to Seattle instead as a result of the Wilson trade. Meanwhile, the Seahawks, who were projected by many to be among the worst teams in the league, finished the season with a 9–8 record, with starting quarterback Geno Smith, who had backed up Wilson for the prior three seasons, winning Comeback Player of the Year honors and a Pro Bowl appearance, good for second in the NFC West and the #7 seed in the playoffs and faced their rival, the NFC West champion and #2 seed San Francisco 49ers. However, Seattle lost to the San Francisco 49ers in the NFC Wild Card Game.

Following the disastrous 2022 season, the Broncos acquired head coach Sean Payton from the New Orleans Saints in another major trade. The Broncos improved in the 2023 season, but still finished with an 8–9 record and missed the playoffs, and Wilson was benched in favor of Jarrett Stidham with two games remaining in the season. On March 4, 2024, Wilson was informed by the Broncos organization that he would be released at the beginning of the 2024 NFL league year. The Broncos missed the playoffs in 2022 and 2023 with Wilson as their starting quarterback. The $85M dead cap hit resulting from Wilson's release set a record for the largest dead cap hit in league history. Wilson would sign a one-year deal with the rival Pittsburgh Steelers for the veteran's minimum eleven days later.

The trade is widely considered to be one of the worst in NFL history from Denver's side, drawing comparisons to the infamous Herschel Walker trade and to the Deshaun Watson trade which also occurred in the 2022 offseason. Seattle used one of the first-round picks acquired from Denver to draft three-time Pro Bowl cornerback Devon Witherspoon.

== Season-by-season results ==
Denver Broncos vs. Seattle Seahawks Season-by-Season Results
1970s (Broncos, 4–1)

| Season | Results | Location | Overall series | Notes |
|---|---|---|---|---|
| 1977 | Broncos; 24–13 | Kingdome | Broncos; 1–0 | Seahawks join NFL as an expansion team and are placed in the NFC West. The following season, they were moved to the AFC West, where they remained through 2001. First meeting in Kingdome. Broncos lose Super Bowl XII. |
| 1978 | Broncos; 28–7 | Mile High Stadium | Broncos; 3–0 | First meeting in Mile High Stadium. |
| 1978 | Broncos; 20–17 (OT) | Kingdome | Broncos; 3–0 | |
| 1979 | Broncos; 37–34 | Mile High Stadium | Broncos; 4–1 | |
| 1979 | Seahawks; 28–23 | Kingdome | Broncos; 4–1 | |

1980s (Broncos, 11–10)

| Season | Season series | at Denver Broncos | at Seattle Seahawks | Overall series | Notes |
|---|---|---|---|---|---|
| 1980 | Broncos 2–0 | Broncos; 36–20 | Broncos; 25–17 | Broncos; 6–1 | |
| 1981 | Tie 1–1 | Broncos; 23–13 | Seahawks; 13–10 | Broncos; 7–2 | |
| 1982 | Seahawks 2–0 | Seahawks; 17–10 | Seahawks; 13–11 | Broncos; 7–4 | Both meetings were played despite the players' strike which reduced the season to 9 games; Seahawks first series sweep. |
| 1983 | Tie 1–1 | Broncos; 38–27 | Seahawks; 27–19 | Broncos; 8–5 | |
| 1983 Playoffs | Seahawks 1–0 | | Seahawks; 31–7 | Broncos; 8–6 | 1983 AFC Wild Card Game. First playoff meeting between the two franchises. |
| 1984 | Tie 1–1 | Seahawks; 27–24 | Broncos; 31–14 | Broncos; 9–7 | Seahawks win snapped the Broncos 10-game winning streak. Meeting in Seattle was a de facto AFC West Championship Game. Broncos win to clinch the division and finished as the #2 seed while forcing the Seahawks into the AFC Wild Card Game as the eventual #4 seed. |
| 1985 | Broncos 2–0 | Broncos; 13–10 (OT) | Broncos; 27–24 | Broncos; 11–7 | |
| 1986 | Tie 1–1 | Broncos; 20–13 | Seahawks; 47–13 | Broncos; 12–8 | Broncos lose Super Bowl XXI. |
| 1987 | Tie 1–1 | Broncos; 40–17 | Seahawks; 28–21 | Broncos; 13–9 | Broncos lose Super Bowl XXII. |
| 1988 | Seahawks 2–0 | Seahawks; 21–14 | Seahawks; 42–14 | Broncos; 13–11 | |
| 1989 | Broncos 2–0 | Broncos; 41–14 | Broncos; 24–21 (OT) | Broncos; 15–11 | Broncos lose Super Bowl XXIV. |

1990s (Broncos, 14–6)

| Season | Season series | at Denver Broncos | at Seattle Seahawks | Overall series | Notes |
|---|---|---|---|---|---|
| 1990 | Tie 1–1 | Broncos; 34–31 (OT) | Seahawks; 17–12 | Broncos; 16–12 | |
| 1991 | Tie 1–1 | Broncos; 16–10 | Seahawks; 13–10 | Broncos; 17–13 | |
| 1992 | Tie 1–1 | Broncos; 10–6 | Seahawks; 16–13 (OT) | Broncos; 18–14 | Seahawks' win was their only home win in their 1992 season. |
| 1993 | Broncos 2–0 | Broncos; 28–17 | Broncos; 17–9 | Broncos; 20–14 | |
| 1994 | Broncos 2–0 | Broncos; 17–10 | Broncos; 16–9 | Broncos; 22–14 | Broncos win six straight meetings in Denver. |
| 1995 | Seahawks 2–0 | Seahawks; 31–27 | Seahawks; 27–10 | Broncos; 22–16 | Following their home loss, the Broncos went on a 24-game home winning streak in the regular season. |
| 1996 | Broncos 2–0 | Broncos; 34–7 | Broncos; 30–20 | Broncos; 24–16 | |
| 1997 | Broncos 2–0 | Broncos; 30–27 | Broncos; 35–14 | Broncos; 26–16 | Broncos win Super Bowl XXXII. |
| 1998 | Broncos 2–0 | Broncos; 28–21 | Broncos; 21–16 | Broncos; 28–16 | Broncos win Super Bowl XXXIII. |
| 1999 | Tie 1–1 | Broncos; 36–30 (OT) | Seahawks; 20–17 | Broncos; 29–17 | Broncos win six straight meetings. Final meeting in Kingdome. |

2000s (Broncos, 4–2)

| Season | Results | Location | Overall series | Notes |
|---|---|---|---|---|
| 2000 | Broncos; 31–24 | Mile High Stadium | Broncos; 31–17 | Final meeting in Mile High Stadium |
| 2000 | Broncos; 38–31 | Husky Stadium | Broncos; 31–17 | Seahawks temporarily play at Husky Stadium during demolition of the Kingdome. |
| 2001 | Broncos; 20–7 | Empower Field at Mile High | Broncos; 32–18 | Broncos open Broncos Stadium at Mile High (known then as "Invesco Field at Mile High"). |
| 2001 | Seahawks; 34–21 | Husky Stadium | Broncos; 32–18 | Final meeting in Husky Stadium. |
| 2002 | Broncos; 31–9 | Seahawks Stadium | Broncos; 33–18 | Seahawks move to the NFC West as a result of NFL realignment. Seahawks open Seahawks Stadium (now known as Lumen Field). |
| 2006 | Seahawks; 23–20 | Empower Field at Mile High | Broncos; 33–19 | Seahawks' first win over Broncos in Denver since 1995. |

2010s (Tied, 2–2)

| Season | Results | Location | Overall series | Notes |
|---|---|---|---|---|
| 2010 | Broncos; 31–14 | Empower Field at Mile High | Broncos; 34–19 | |
| 2013 playoffs | Seahawks; 43–8 | MetLife Stadium | Broncos; 34–20 | Super Bowl XLVIII. First meeting between Peyton Manning and Russell Wilson. |
| 2014 | Seahawks; 26–20 (OT) | CenturyLink Field | Broncos; 34–21 | Peyton Manning's final start in the series. First Super Bowl rematch in the immediate following season since the Green Bay Packers and New England Patriots met in 1997 in a rematch of Super Bowl XXXI. |
| 2018 | Broncos; 27–24 | Empower Field at Mile High | Broncos; 35–21 | Russell Wilson's final start in the series for the Seahawks. |

2020s (Seahawks, 2–1)

| Season | Results | Location | Overall series | Notes |
|---|---|---|---|---|
| 2022 | Seahawks; 17–16 | Lumen Field | Broncos; 35–22 | After 10 years with the Seahawks, Russell Wilson is traded to the Broncos. Wilson's first start as a Bronco. |
| 2024 | Seahawks; 26–20 | Lumen Field | Broncos; 35–23 | |
| 2026 | Broncos; 17–14 (OT) | Empower Field at Mile High | Broncos; 36–23 | |

Summary of Results

| Season | Season series | at Denver Broncos | at Seattle Seahawks | Notes |
|---|---|---|---|---|
| Regular season | Broncos 36–21 | Broncos 23–5 | Seahawks 16–13 | |
| Postseason | Seahawks 2–0 | —N/a | Seahawks 1–0 | AFC Wild Card: 1983; Super Bowl: XLVIII |
| Regular and postseason | Broncos 36–23 | Broncos 23–5 | Seahawks 17–13 | Seahawks are 1–0 at neutral site games |
