= Mount Morrison (Colorado) =

Mountain in the American state of Colorado

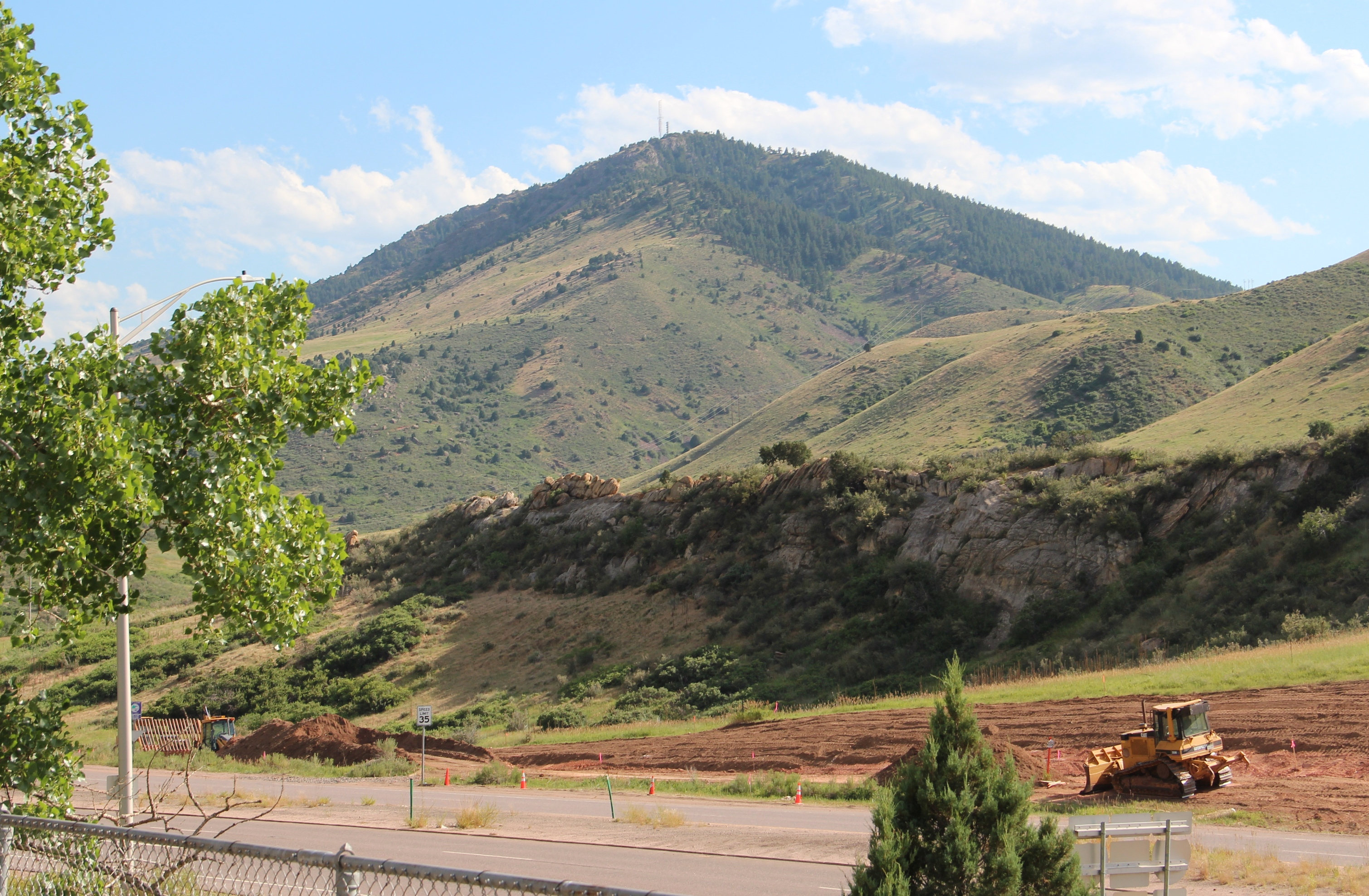
- Mount Morrison as seen from I-70

Highest point
- Elevation: 7,881 ft (2,402 m)
- Prominence: 741 ft (226 m)
- Isolation: 4.59 mi (7.39 km)
- Coordinates: 39°40′09″N 105°13′11″W

Geography
- Location within Colorado
- Location: Jefferson County, Colorado, U.S.
- Parent range: Front Range
- Topo map(s): USGS 7.5' topographic map Morrison, Colorado

Climbing
- Easiest route: hike

Mount Morrison is a foothill on the eastern flank of the Front Range of the Rocky Mountains of North America. The 7,881-foot (2,402 m) peak is located in Red Rocks Park, 1.9 miles (3.0 km) northwest by west (bearing 305°) of the Town of Morrison in Jefferson County, Colorado, United States. Red Rocks Amphitheatre is located on the eastern side of the mountain.

== See also ==
- List of Colorado mountain ranges
- List of Colorado mountain summits
  - List of Colorado fourteeners
  - List of Colorado 4000 meter prominent summits
  - List of the most prominent summits of Colorado
- List of Colorado county high points
