= KXPK =

Coordinates: 39.676°N 105.486°W

- Evergreen, Colorado; United States
- Broadcast area: Denver-Boulder
- Frequency: 96.5 MHz
- Branding: La Tricolor 96.5

Programming
- Format: Regional Mexican

Ownership
- Owner: Entravision Communications; (Entravision Holdings, LLC)
- Sister stations: KJMN, KMXA

History
- First air date: 1994
- Call sign meaning: Station branded as "The Peak"

Technical information
- Licensing authority: FCC
- Facility ID: 20300
- Class: C
- ERP: 100,000 watts
- HAAT: 526 meters (1,726 ft)
- Repeater: 96.5 KXPK-FM1 (Boulder)

Links
- Public license information: Public file; LMS
- Webcast: Listen Live
- Website: radiolatricolor.com/denver/

KXPK (96.5 FM "La Tricolor 96.5") is a commercial radio station licensed to Evergreen, Colorado, and serving the Denver-Boulder radio market. The station is owned by Entravision and it airs a regional Mexican radio format. Its studios are located in Denver near Empower Field at Mile High, and the transmitter is on Squaw Mountain in Idaho Springs, Colorado.

KXPK's main transmitter has an effective radiated power (ERP) of 100,000 watts. Programming is also heard on a 500–watt booster station in Boulder, Colorado, KXPK-FM1, also on 96.5 MHz.

== History ==
=== Adult alternative (1994–1998) ===
On June 8, 1994, KXPK first signed on. It was owned by Evergreen Communications and began with an adult album alternative format, calling itself "96.5 The Peak", and aimed to compete with heritage station KBCO, which often leads the Denver market's ratings for 25-54-year-old men. But while KBCO's ratings remained strong, KXPK failed to catch on with adult rock listeners.

=== Alternative (1998–2000) ===
On October 12, 1998, KXPK changed to a younger-skewing alternative rock format, and added the syndicated "Howard Stern Show" in morning drive time, while still retaining the "Peak" moniker. In April 1999, the station gained some brief notoriety when Stern made controversial comments on the Columbine High School massacre, with hundreds of complaints filed to the station.

In 2000, the station was bought by Emmis Communications of Indianapolis, along with rhythmic contemporary station KKFR in Phoenix. The price tag for both stations was $108 million.

=== 80s hits (2000–2002) ===
On September 5, 2000, KXPK moved to an All-'80s Hits format, retaining the "Peak" moniker. Howard Stern was dropped at this time. Original MTV VJ Nina Blackwood was the afternoon DJ during this period.

In 2001, Entercom (now Audacy, Inc.), which owns several Denver-area stations, acquired KXPK. The company quickly moved to sell the station to Entravision for $47.5 million. Entravision specializes in Spanish music formats and saw the Denver market with its large Hispanic population as needing a new Spanish FM station.

=== Regional Mexican (2002–present) ===
The Peak's English-language format officially ended on April 18, 2002. KXPK then began stunting with a two-week simulcast of Entercom-owned KALC, advising KXPK listeners to move to the now former sister station and its Modern AC format.

After the simulcast ended, Entravision took control of KXPK and began airing Entravision's "Radio Tri-Color" Regional Mexican music format.
