= KMXA (AM) =

Radio station in Aurora–Denver, Colorado

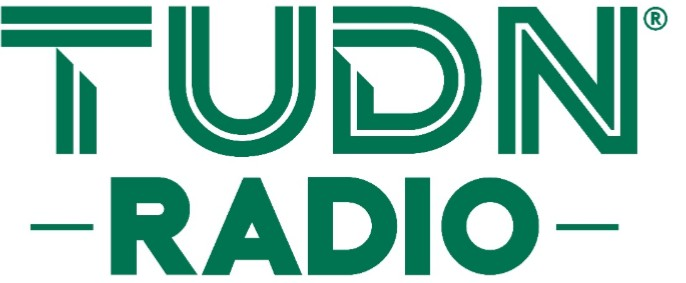
- Aurora, Colorado; United States
- Broadcast area: Denver metropolitan area
- Frequency: 1090 kHz
- Branding: TUDN Radio Denver

Programming
- Language: Spanish
- Format: Sports
- Affiliations: TUDN Radio

Ownership
- Owner: Entravision Communications; (Entravision Holdings, LLC)
- Sister stations: KJMN, KXPK

History
- First air date: September 12, 1972 (as KAAT)
- Former call signs: KAAT (1972–1979); KLDR (1979–1984); KLSZ (1984–1985); KLSC (1985–1987); KYBG (1987–1996)

Technical information
- Licensing authority: FCC
- Facility ID: 10057
- Class: B
- Power: 50,000 watts day; 500 watts night
- Transmitter coordinates: 39°39′53″N 104°39′25.9″W

Links
- Public license information: Public file; LMS

KMXA (1090 kHz) is a commercial AM radio station licensed to Aurora, Colorado, and serving the Denver metropolitan area. It broadcasts a Spanish-language sports format and is owned by Entravision Communications Corporation.

KMXA broadcasts at 50,000 watts by day, the maximum power for FCC-licensed AM radio stations. Because AM 1090 is a clear channel frequency, reserved for Class A stations WBAL in Baltimore and XEPRS in Tijuana, KMXA must reduce power at night to 500 watts to avoid interference. It uses a directional antenna at all times.

== History ==
On September 12, 1972, the station went on the air as KAAT, originally licensed to Denver. It was powered at 50,000 watts, but was a daytimer, and was owned by the Colorado Radio Corporation.

In 1978, Colorado Radio Corporation sold KAAT to Leo Payne Broadcasting. On January 2, 1979, KAAT became KLDR. The station's format was current and oldies top 40, with the playlist totally determined by listeners' requests. It promoted itself as "Colorado's all-request station". KLDR also carried broadcasts of Colorado State Rams football.

KLDR became KLSZ in 1984, and KLSC on September 25, 1985. In 1987, KLSC became KYBG (known as "KBIG"), the first all-sports radio station west of the Mississippi River, which was on air in the late 1980s and early 1990s. Irv Brown was an early host on the station as well.

On December 29, 1995, KYBG dropped the sports format and began simulcasting KQKS.

In August 1996, after being sold to EXCL Communications (which later became Entravision), KYBG flipped to Spanish-language programming as KMXA.

In 2009, the station began simulcasting sister station KXPK 96.5 FM. Later, the station broadcast the 'Jose' Spanish Oldies format.

Up until the 2012 season, KMXA carried live play-by-play of the Colorado Rockies of Major League Baseball.

On June 3, 2015, the station flipped to Entravision's "Super Estrella" Spanish CHR format.

On January 10, 2018, as part of a company-wide change, KMXA dropped the "Super Estrella" format (KJMN would also drop the "Jose" format) and flipped to an 1980s/1990s Spanish adult contemporary hits format as "La Suavecita."

On January 21, 2019, KMXA split from its simulcast with KJMN and switched to ESPN Deportes Radio Spanish sports. Over the weekend of August 31, 2019, the station dropped ESPN Deportes Radio ahead of the network's September 8 closure. The station played ranchero and Norteño music as "José 1090AM". It has since returned to Spanish sports with programming from TUDN Radio as of August 2020.
