= KJMN =

Radio station in Castle Rock, Colorado

- Castle Rock, Colorado; United States
- Broadcast area: Denver–Boulder
- Frequency: 92.1 MHz (HD Radio)
- Branding: La Suavecita 92.1

Programming
- Language: Spanish
- Format: Adult hits

Ownership
- Owner: Entravision Communications; (Entravision Holdings, LLC)
- Sister stations: KMXA, KXPK

History
- First air date: 1979 (as KMJD)
- Former call signs: KMJD (1979–1983); KRKY (1983–1984); KADX (1984–1988); KZRZ (1988–1989); KYBG-FM (1989–1995); KNRX (1995–1996)
- Call sign meaning: "Jammin'" (previous branding)

Technical information
- Licensing authority: FCC
- Facility ID: 10056
- Class: C2
- ERP: 42,000 watts
- HAAT: 163 meters (535 ft)
- Transmitter coordinates: 39°23′7″N 105°2′52″W

Links
- Public license information: Public file; LMS
- Webcast: Listen live
- Website: www.radiolasuavecita.com/denver/

KJMN (92.1 FM, "La Suavecita 92.1") is a radio station broadcasting a Spanish-language adult hits format licensed to Castle Rock, Colorado, United States, serving the Denver-Boulder area. The station is owned by Entravision Communications. Its studios are located in Denver near Sports Authority Field at Mile High, and the transmitter is west of Castle Rock.

== History ==
KJMN signed on the air in 1979 as country KMJD, but would go through various formats and call letters as adult contemporary KRKY (1983–84), jazz KADX (1984–88), rock KZRZ (1988–89), country and talk KYBG (1989–March 29, 1995), and modern rock KNRX (March 29, 1995 – February 29, 1996).

=== KNRX/92-X ===
During the KNRX stretch, 92.1 was called "92-X", and catered to the modern rock and alternative rock listeners. One DJ was known as Malcolm, and he spoke in a low monotone.

=== KJMN/JAM'N 92.1 ===
On February 29, 1996, at 8:00 p.m., KNRX shook up the market by luring the airstaffers away from rhythmic top 40 station KQKS (then known as KS104) and launched KJMN "JAM'N 92.1". During its rhythmic tenure, they would attack KQKS on air and on the streets, but the tactics would backfire the following November when KQKS was sold to Jefferson-Pilot, who would later shake up the airwaves in February 1997 by moving KQKS to 107.5 FM and quickly reclaiming their listeners/ratings thanks to the 107.5 signal having three times the power of 92.1 at the time.

KJMN's on-air staff included: Mornings—Mark & Laurie, Mark & Mercedes, Middays/Overnights—Brandon Scott, Afternoons—Michael Hayes, Nights—Sweet G, Late Nights—Ed Atkins. Weekends—Kevin O'Brien, Jess Kendall, Jay Zilinskas

=== EXCL purchases 92.1 ===
After EXCL Communications (later Entravision) acquired the station in January 1997, they pulled the plug on "JAM'N 92.1" that March 30 to bring Denver its first Spanish FM outlet, launching Spanish AC "Radio Romántica 92.1", but kept the KJMN calls. However, by 2004, they would flip to Entravision's Spanish Top 40 "Super Estrella" format. The station is currently a "satellite" repeater station programmed out of Los Angeles, running local Denver advertising. No original programming is done in Denver.

In January 2009, KJMN switched formats from Super Estrella's Spanish AC format to the "Jose" Spanish adult hits format.

On January 10, 2018, as part of a company-wide change, KJMN and sister simulcaster KMXA dropped the "Jose" format and flipped to an 80s/90s Spanish hits format as "La Suavecita."

On January 21, 2019, KMXA split from its simulcast with KJMN and switched to "ESPN Deportes" Spanish sports, while KJMN rebranded as "La Suavecita 92.1".

== Previous logos ==
(KJMN's logo under previous simulcast with KMXA 1090 AM)
