= List of television stations in California =

This is a list of broadcast television stations that are licensed in the U.S. state of California.

== Full-power ==
- Stations are arranged by media market served and channel position.

Full-power television stations in California
Media market	Station	Channel	Primary affiliation(s)	Notes	Refs
Bakersfield	KGET-TV	17	NBC, The CW on 17.2, Telemundo on 17.3		
Bakersfield	KERO-TV	23	ABC		
Bakersfield	KBAK-TV	29	CBS, Fox on 58.2		
Bakersfield	KUVI-DT	45	Quest, Univision on 45.2, UniMás on 45.3		
Chico–Redding	KRCR-TV	7	ABC, Fox on 20.1		
Chico–Redding	KIXE-TV	9	PBS		
Chico–Redding	KHSL-TV	12	CBS, The CW on 12.2		
Chico–Redding	KCVU	20	Fox	(Note: Licensed to Paradise, California.)	
Chico–Redding	KNVN	24	NBC, Telemundo on 24.2		
Eureka	KIEM-TV	3	NBC, Ion Television on 3.2		
Eureka	KEET	13	PBS		
Eureka	KAEF-TV	23	ABC	(Note: Licensed to Arcata, California.) (Note: Semi-satellite of KRCR-TV.)	
Eureka	KBVU	28	Fox	(Note: Semi-satellite of KCVU.)	
Fresno	KAIL	7	TCT, MyNetworkTV on 7.5		
Fresno	KVPT	18	PBS		
Fresno	KFTV-DT	21	Univision, UniMás on 21.6	(Note: Licensed to Hanford, California.)	
Fresno	KSEE	24	NBC		
Fresno	KMPH-TV	26	Fox	(Note: Licensed to Visalia, California.)	
Fresno	KEDZ	27	Religious Independent	(Note: Licensed to Tulare, California.)	
Fresno	KFSN-TV	30	ABC		
Fresno	KGMC	43	Estrella TV	(Note: Licensed to Merced, California.)	
Fresno	KGPE	47	CBS		
Fresno	KIFR	49	Daystar Español		
Fresno	KNSO	51	Telemundo, TeleXitos on 51.2	(Note: Licensed to Clovis, California.)	
Fresno	KFRE-TV	59	The CW, Fox on 26.4	(Note: Licensed to Sanger, California.)	
Fresno	KTFF-DT	61	UniMás, Univision on 61.2	(Note: Licensed to Porterville, California.)	
Los Angeles	KCBS-TV	2	CBS		
Los Angeles	KNBC	4	NBC		
Los Angeles	KTLA	5	The CW		
Los Angeles	KABC-TV	7	ABC		
Los Angeles	KCAL-TV	9	Independent		
Los Angeles	KTTV	11	Fox		
Los Angeles	KCOP-TV	13	MyNetworkTV		
Los Angeles	KSCI	18	Shop LC	(Note: Licensed to Long Beach, California.)	
Los Angeles	KVME-TV	20	Jewelry TV	(Note: Licensed to Bishop, California.)	
Los Angeles	KSCN-TV	22	Scientology Network		
Los Angeles	KVCR-DT	24	PBS	(Note: Licensed to San Bernardino, California.)	
Los Angeles	KCET	28	PBS		
Los Angeles	KPXN-TV	30	Ion Television		
Los Angeles	KVMD	31	Independent		
Los Angeles	KMEX-DT	34	Univision, UniMás on 34.2		
Los Angeles	KTBN-TV	40	TBN	(Note: Licensed to Santa Ana, California.)	
Los Angeles	KXLA	44	LATV	(Note: Licensed to Rancho Palos Verdes, California.)	
Los Angeles	KFTR-DT	46	UniMás	(Note: Licensed to Ontario, California.)	
Los Angeles	KOCE-TV	50	PBS	(Note: Licensed to Huntington Beach, California.)	
Los Angeles	KVEA	52	Telemundo, TeleXitos on 52.2	(Note: Licensed to Corona, California.)	
Los Angeles	KAZA-TV	54	MeTV	(Note: Licensed to Avalon, California.)	
Los Angeles	KDOC-TV	56	TCT	(Note: Licensed to Anaheim, California.)	
Los Angeles	KJLA	57	Visión Latina	(Note: Licensed to Ventura, California.)	
Los Angeles	KLCS	58	PBS		
Los Angeles	KRCA	62	Estrella TV	(Note: Licensed to Riverside, California.)	
Los Angeles	KWHY	63	Multicultural independent	(Note: Licensed to Garden Grove, California.)	
Los Angeles	KILM	64	Bounce TV	(Note: Licensed to Inglewood, California.)	
Monterey–Salinas	KSBW	8	NBC, ABC on 8.2		
Monterey–Salinas	KQET	25	PBS	(Note: Licensed to Watsonville, California.) (Note: Satellite of KQED.)	
Monterey–Salinas	KCBA	35	The CW		
Monterey–Salinas	KION-TV	46	CBS, Fox on 46.2		
Monterey–Salinas	KSMS-TV	67	Univision		
Palm Springs	KMIR-TV	36	NBC		
Palm Springs	KESQ-TV	42	ABC, CBS on 42.2, The CW on 2.3, Telemundo on 15.2, Fox on 33.2		
Sacramento	KCRA-TV	3	NBC		
Sacramento	KVIE	6	PBS		
Sacramento	KXTV	10	ABC		
Sacramento	KOVR	13	CBS	(Note: Licensed to Stockton, California.)	
Sacramento	KEDS	16	Religious Independent	(Note: Licensed to Colusa, California.)	
Sacramento	KUVS-DT	19	Univision, UniMás on 64.2	(Note: Licensed to Modesto, California.)	
Sacramento	KBSV	23	Independent	(Note: Licensed to Ceres, California.)	
Sacramento	KSPX-TV	29	Ion Television, Telemundo on 33.2		
Sacramento	KMAX-TV	31	Independent, Telemundo on 31.7		
Sacramento	KTXL	40	Fox		
Sacramento	KQCA	58	The CW/MyNetworkTV		
Sacramento	KTFK-DT	64	UniMás, Univision on 19.2		
San Diego	KFMB-TV	8	CBS, The CW/MyNetworkTV on 8.2		
San Diego	KGTV	10	ABC		
San Diego	KPBS	15	PBS		
San Diego	KNSD	39	NBC		
San Diego	KUSI-TV	51	The CW		
San Diego	KSWB-TV	69	Fox		
San Francisco	KTVU	2	Fox	(Note: Licensed to Oakland, California.)	
San Francisco	KRON-TV	4	The CW		
San Francisco	KPIX-TV	5	CBS		
San Francisco	KEDB	6	Religious Independent	(Note: Licensed to Fort Bragg, California.)	
San Francisco	KGO-TV	7	ABC		
San Francisco	KQSL	8	Total Living Network		
San Francisco	KQED	9	PBS		
San Francisco	KNTV	11	NBC	(Note: Licensed to San Jose, California.)	
San Francisco	KDTV-DT	14	Univision		
San Francisco	KOFY-TV	20	Merit TV		
San Francisco	KRCB	22	PBS	(Note: Licensed to Cotati, California.)	
San Francisco	KTSF	26	Independent		
San Francisco	KMTP-TV	32	Non-commercial independent		
San Francisco	KICU-TV	36	MyNetworkTV		
San Francisco	KCNS	38	Shop LC		
San Francisco	KTNC-TV	42	TCT	(Note: Licensed to Concord, California.)	
San Francisco	KPYX	44	Independent		
San Francisco	KSTS	48	Telemundo, TeleXitos on 48.2		
San Francisco	KEMO-TV	50	Various	(Note: Licensed to Fremont, California.)	
San Francisco	KQEH	54	PBS		
San Francisco	KPJK	60	Educational independent	(Note: Licensed to San Mateo, California.)	
San Francisco	KKPX-TV	65	Ion Television		
San Francisco	KFSF-DT	66	UniMás, Univision on 66.2	(Note: Licensed to Vallejo, California.)	
San Francisco	KTLN-TV	68	Heroes & Icons	(Note: Licensed to Palo Alto, California.)	
San Luis Obispo	KEYT-TV	3	ABC, CBS on 3.2, MyNetworkTV on 3.3, Telemundo on 3.5	(Note: Licensed to Santa Barbara, California.)	
San Luis Obispo	KSBY	6	NBC		
San Luis Obispo	KCOY-TV	12	Telemundo, Fox on 12.2, The CW on 12.3	(Note: Licensed to Santa Maria, California.)	
San Luis Obispo	KTAS	33	Diya TV		
San Luis Obispo	KPMR	38	Univision, UniMás on 38.3		
~Yuma, AZ	KVYE	7	Univision	(Note: Licensed to El Centro, California.)	
~Yuma, AZ	KECY-TV	9	Fox, ABC on 9.2, The CW on 9.3, Telemundo on 9.4		
~Yuma, AZ	KAJB	54	UniMás	(Note: Licensed to Calipatria, California.)	

== Low-power ==
Low-power television stations in California
Media market	Station	Channel	Network	Notes	Refs
Bakersfield	KTLD-CD	8	Various		
Bakersfield	KJOU-LD	12	Various		
Bakersfield	KKEY-LP	13	Telemundo		
Bakersfield	KXBF-LD	14	Various		
Bakersfield	KBBV-CD	19	TeleXitos		
Bakersfield	K21PL-D	24	Silent		
Bakersfield	KBTF-CD	31	UniMás		
Bakersfield	KJOI-LD	32	Various		
Bakersfield	KBFK-LP	34	Various		
Bakersfield	KCBT-LD	34	Estrella TV		
Bakersfield	KABE-CD	39	Univision		
Bakersfield	KDBK-LD	41	Jewelry TV		
Bakersfield	KEBK-LD	47	Various		
Bakersfield	KNXT-LD	53	MyNetworkTV		
Bakersfield	KBFX-CD	58	Fox		
Chico	KKRM-LD	11	theDove		
Chico	K32PC-D	15	3ABN		
Chico	KXVU-LD	17	[Blank]		
Chico	KXCH-LD	19	Various		
Chico	KZVU-LD	22	MyNetworkTV		
Chico	K23PH-D	23	[Blank]		
Chico	K25QL-D	25	[Blank]		
Chico	KUCO-LD	27	Univision		
Chico	KKTF-LD	30	UniMás		
Chico	K35OZ-D	40	Silent		
Eureka	KVIQ-LD	14	CBS		
Eureka	K16JJ-D	16	[Blank]		
Eureka	KECA-LD	29	The CW, MyNetworkTV on 29.2		
Eureka	KEMY-LD	33	[Blank]		
Eureka	KEUV-LD	35	Univision		
Eureka	K19KR-D	39	3ABN	(Note: Licensed to Crescent City, California.)	
Eureka	K32OI-D	41	3ABN		
Fresno	KVHF-LD	4	Guide		
Fresno	K04SF-D	4	[Blank]	(Note: Licensed to Gustine, California.)	
Fresno	KMCF-LD	6	The Country Network		
Fresno	KKDJ-CD	8.2	Catchy Comedy		
Fresno	K17IJ-D	12	Religious independent		
Fresno	KVBC-LD	13	Ion Television	(Note: Licensed to Reedley, California.)	
Fresno	KBNK-LD	14	Various		
Fresno	KJKZ-LD	13.11	[Blank]		
Fresno	KFVD-LD	15	[Blank]		
Fresno	KHSC-LD	16	Various		
Fresno	K19NB-D	19	Diya TV		
Fresno	KZMM-CD	22	Various		
Fresno	KBID-LP	31	Al Jazeera English		
Fresno	KJEO-LD	32.6	Hmong TV Network		
Fresno	KMSG-LD	39.1	LATV		
Fresno	KNXT-LD	53	MyNetworkTV		
Fresno	KVVG-LD	54	CBN News		
High Desert	K21AC-D	21	Independent	(Note: Licensed to Victorville, California.)	
High Desert	K25AD-D	25	Silent		
High Desert	K30MN-D	30	[Blank]	(Note: Licensed to Barstow, California.)	
High Desert	K30NY-D	30	Silent		
High Desert	K31AD-D	31	[Blank]		
High Desert	KVVB-LD	33	Various	(Note: Licensed to Lucerne Valley, California.)	
High Desert	K36JH-D	36	Various		
Los Angeles	KSGA-LD	3	KFMB-DT2		
Los Angeles	KHTV-CD	6	MeTV+		
Los Angeles	KFLA-LD	8	Various		
Los Angeles	KIIO-LD	10	USArmenia		
Los Angeles	KZSW-LD	10	3ABN		
Los Angeles	KZNO-LD	12	Jewelry TV		
Los Angeles	KPOM-CD	14	Catchy Comedy		
Los Angeles	KMRZ-LD	16	Jewelry TV	(Note: Licensed to Pomona, California.)	
Los Angeles	KILA-LD	19	KFLA-LD	(Note: Licensed to Cherry Valley, California.)	
Los Angeles	KNLA-CD	20	Daystar Español		
Los Angeles	KNET-CD	25	Daystar		
Los Angeles	KRVD-LD	33	LSTV		
Los Angeles	KSFV-CD	27	MeTV Toons		
Los Angeles	KTAV-LD	35	Almavision		
Los Angeles	KHIZ-LD	39	Various		
Los Angeles	KSKJ-CD	45	Various	(Note: Licensed to Van Nuys, California.)	
Los Angeles	KEDD-LD	45	Jewelry TV		
Monterey–Salinas	KOTR-LD	7	MyNetworkTV		
Monterey–Salinas	K09AAF-D	9	Various		
Monterey–Salinas	K33QY-D	10	Religious independent		
Monterey–Salinas	KMBT-LD	12	Various		
Monterey–Salinas	K15CU-D	15	Cozi TV		
Monterey–Salinas	K14TG-D	17	Total Living Network		
Monterey–Salinas	KBNY-LD	19	Various		
Monterey–Salinas	KLFB-LD	22	3ABN		
Monterey–Salinas	KBIT-LD	24	Diya TV		
Monterey–Salinas	KMBY-LD	27	MeTV		
Monterey–Salinas	KDJT-CD	33	UniMás		
Monterey–Salinas	K31OL-D	38	Educational independent		
Monterey–Salinas	KMMD-CD	39	Court TV		
Monterey–Salinas	KMCE-LD	43	Various		
Palm Springs	KCWQ-LD	2	The CW, Fox on 33.3		
Palm Springs	KAKZ-LD	4	[Blank]	(Note: Licensed to Cathedral City, California.)	
Palm Springs	KEVC-CD	5	UniMás	(Note: Licensed to Indio, California.)	
Palm Springs	KVPS-LD	8	Religious independent		
Palm Springs	KPSP-CD	12	Independent, Telemundo on 15.1, CBS on 38.1		
Palm Springs	KYAV-LD	12.2	Independent		
Palm Springs	KUNA-LD	15	Telemundo		
Palm Springs	K02RL-D	20	Silent		
Palm Springs	K21DO-D	21	Various		
Palm Springs	KPDI-LD	25	Diya TV		
Palm Springs	KVES-LD	28	Silent		
Palm Springs	KDFX-CD	33	Fox, The CW on 39.2		
Palm Springs	KVER-CD	41	Univision, UniMás on 41.2		
Palm Springs	KRET-CD	45	Various		
Palm Springs	KPSE-LD	50	MyNetworkTV		
Redding	KVFR-LD	8	IBN Television		
Redding	KMCA-LD	10	Antenna TV		
Redding	K13AAX-D	13	[Blank]		
Redding	KRVU-LD	21	MyNetworkTV, Univision on 46.1		
Redding	KQSX-LD	33	[Blank]	(Note: Licensed to Mount Shasta, California.)	
Redding	KRHT-LD	41	Various		
Redding	K24MI-D	44	[Blank]		
Ridgecrest	KZGN-LD	21	Various		
Ridgecrest	K31MB-D	41	Independent		
Sacramento	KBTV-CD	8	Various		
Sacramento	K11XS-D	11	[Blank]		
Sacramento	KEFM-LD	15	[Blank]		
Sacramento	K20OO-D	20	[Blank]		
Sacramento	K20JX-D	27	Good News TV		
Sacramento	KSTV-LD	32	LATV		
Sacramento	KFKK-LD	32	Various		
Sacramento	KCSO-LD	33	Telemundo, TeleXitos on 33.3		
Sacramento	KACA-LD	34	Daystar		
Sacramento	K04QR-D	38	Various	(Note: Licensed to Esparto, California.)	
Sacramento	KBIS-LD	38	Various	(Note: Licensed to Turlock, California.)	
Sacramento	KAHC-LD	43	Various		
Sacramento	KRJR-LD	44	Daystar		
Sacramento	KFTY-LD	45	Various	(Note: Licensed to Middletown, California.)	
Sacramento	KFMS-LD	47	Various		
Sacramento	KSAO-LD	49	Various		
Sacramento	K12XJ-D	49	Various		
Sacramento	KMSX-LD	51	IBN Television		
San Diego	KZTC-LD	7	Various		
San Diego	KSDX-LD	9	Various		
San Diego	KBNT-CD	17	Univision		
San Diego	KVSD-LD	26	Daystar		
San Diego	KDTF-LD	36	UniMás, Univision on 36.17		
San Diego	KSKT-CD	43	Various	(Note: Licensed to San Marcos, California.)	
San Diego	KUAN-LD	48	Telemundo, TeleXitos on 48.2	(Note: Licensed to Poway, California.)	
San Diego	KSDY-LD	50	Nuestra Visión		
San Francisco	KAXT-CD	1	Catchy Comedy		
San Francisco	KURK-LD	3	theDove		
San Francisco	KBKF-LD	6	Air1 audio		
San Francisco	KPJC-LD	12	News of the World		
San Francisco	KQTA-LD	15	Various		
San Francisco	KFMY-LD	15	Various	(Note: Licensed to Petaluma, California.)	
San Francisco	KZHD-LD	15	Various	(Note: Licensed to Rohnert Park, California.)	
San Francisco	KSCZ-LD	16	Various		
San Francisco	KQSL-LD	17	theDove	(Note: Licensed to San Rafael, California.)	
San Francisco	KMPX-LD	18	Various		
San Francisco	KAAP-LD	24	Diya TV	(Note: Licensed to Santa Cruz, California.)	
San Francisco	KUKR-LD	27	theDove	(Note: Licensed to Santa Rosa, California.)	
San Francisco	KCNZ-CD	28	LATV		
San Francisco	KMMC-LD	30	Estrella TV		
San Francisco	KQRO-LD	45	Various	(Note: Licensed to Morgan Hill, California.)	
San Francisco	KDTS-LD	52	Daystar		
San Luis Obispo	K07AAN-D	7	[Blank]		
San Luis Obispo	K14TK-D	14	[Blank]		
San Luis Obispo	KLDF-CD	17	Various	(Note: Licensed to Lompoc, California.)	
San Luis Obispo	KLFA-LD	25	[Blank]		
San Luis Obispo	K26PP-D	26	[Blank]	(Note: Licensed to Santa Maria and Lompoc, California.)	
San Luis Obispo	KQMM-CD	29	Various		
San Luis Obispo	KDFS-CD	30	Various		
San Luis Obispo	KWSM-LD	32	Estrella TV		
San Luis Obispo	KSBO-CD	42	Various		
San Luis Obispo	KCCF-LD	46	Independent	(Note: Licensed to Atascadero, California.)	
Santa Barbara	KZDF-LD	8	Various		
Santa Barbara	K22OP-D	15	[Blank]		
Santa Barbara	KSBT-LD	32	[Blank]		
Santa Barbara	K35PJ-D	35	[Blank]		
Santa Barbara	KPDY-LD	36	Various		
Santa Barbara	KVMM-CD	41	Various		
Susanville	K19GA-D	19	[Blank]		
Susanville	K30PZ-D	48	[Blank]	(Note: Licensed to Litchfield, California.)	
~Laughlin, NV	K26PR-D	26	Good News TV	(Note: Licensed to Needles, California.)	

== Translators ==
Translator television stations in California
Media market	Station	Channel	Translating	Notes	Refs
Bakersfield	K18HD-D	18	KVPT		
Bakersfield	KZKC-LD	28	KERO-TV		
Bakersfield	K04SB-D	46	KCET		
Chico	K05EM-D	7; 20	KRCR-TV; KCVU		
Chico	K33QW-D	7; 20	KRCR-TV; KCVU	(Note: Licensed to Oroville, California.)	
Chico	K18ND-D	9	KIXE-TV		
Chico	K31ND-D	12; 24	KHSL-TV; KNVN		
Chico	KYUB-LD	15	KKRM-LD	(Note: Licensed to Yuba City, California.)	
Chico	K26PQ-D	20	KCVU		
Chico	K21OY-D	21	KKRM-LD		
Chico	K04QC-D	22	KZVU-LD	(Note: Licensed to Palermo, California.)	
Chico	KKPM-CD	28	KKRM-CD		
Eureka	K07GJ-D	3	KIEM-TV	(Note: Licensed to Hoopa, California.)	
Eureka	K02OD-D	3	KIEM-TV	(Note: Licensed to Shelter Cove, California.)	
Eureka	K12JJ-D	7	KRCR-TV	(Note: Licensed to Benbow, California.)	
Eureka	K21OO-D	10	KAEF-TV		
Eureka	K36HM-D	12	KDRV	(Note: Licensed to Fort Dick, California.)	
Eureka	K23NI-D	13	KEET		
Eureka	K20CN-D	23	KAEF-TV	(Note: Licensed to Fortuna and Rio Dell, California.)	
Eureka	K25NO-D	30	KBLN-TV	(Note: Licensed to Gasquet, California.)	
Eureka	K35LF-D	35	KEUV-LD		
Fresno	KMPH-CD	17	KMPH-TV		
Fresno	KTFF-LD	41	KTFF-DT		
High Desert	K10IX-D	2	KCBS-TV	(Note: Licensed to Newberry Springs, California.)	
High Desert	K26MW-D	7; 62	KABC-TV; KRCA		
High Desert	K32OX-D	9	KCAL-TV		
High Desert	K32OX-D	9	KCAL-TV		
High Desert	K06IQ-D	11	KTTV		
High Desert	K18IM-D	11	KCBS-TV; KNBC; KTLA; KCET	(Note: Licensed to Daggett, California.)	
High Desert	K21MH-D	21	KCAL-TV; KABC-TV; KTTV; KCOP-TV		
High Desert	K23ML-D	23	KPXN-TV; KMEX-DT		
High Desert	K24LS-D	24	KNBC		
High Desert	K25QB-D	25	KCBS-TV; KNBC; KSCI; KCET		
High Desert	K27ON-D	27	KCOP-TV; KABC-TV; KTTV		
High Desert	K27AE-D	27	KTTV		
High Desert	K29NN-D	29	KCAL-TV; KPOM-CD; KHTV-CD; KPXN-TV		
High Desert	K23OM-D	47	KCET		
Los Angeles	KSGA-LD	3	KFMB-DT2		
Los Angeles	KIMG-LD	3	KFMB-DT2		
Los Angeles	K03JB-D	3	KFMB-DT2	(Note: Licensed to Temecula, California.)	
Los Angeles	K21MO-D	24	KVCR-DT		
Los Angeles	KRMV-LD	50	KOCE-TV	(Note: Licensed to Walnut, California.)	
Monterey–Salinas	K10RY-D	3	KQSL	(Note: Licensed to San Juan Bautista, California.)	
Monterey–Salinas	K21PI-D	21	WBPI-CD		
Monterey–Salinas	KMUV-LD	23; 46	KION-TV		
Monterey–Salinas	K30OM-D	36	KICU-TV		
Palm Springs	K09XW-D	9	KOCE-TV	(Note: Licensed to Palm Desert, California.)	
Palm Springs	KGBY-LD	10	KPJC-LD		
Palm Springs	KODG-LD	17	KSCI; KOCE-TV		
Palm Springs	KJHP-LD	24	KVCR-DT	(Note: Licensed to Morongo Valley, California.)	
Palm Springs	K35LA-D	35	KCET		
Redding	K05CF-D	7	KRCR-TV	(Note: Licensed to Weaverville, California.)	
Redding	K05DQ-D	7	KRCR-TV	(Note: Licensed to Burney, California.)	
Redding	K02EE-D	9	KIXE-TV		
Redding	K05CR-D	9	KIXE-TV	(Note: Licensed to Hayfork, California.)	
Redding	K14HX-D	9	KIXE-TV	(Note: Licensed to Lakehead, California.)	
Redding	K28CY-D	9	KIXE-TV	(Note: Licensed to Lewiston, California.)	
Redding	K28DB-D	9	KIXE-TV	(Note: Licensed to Fall River Mills, California.)	
Redding	K31PS-D	12	KHSL-TV	(Note: Licensed to Lakeshore, California.)	
Redding	K16IW-D	16	KKRM-LD		
Redding	KDRC-LD	18	KDOV-LD		
Redding	K22MD-D	20	KCVU	(Note: Licensed to Anderson, California and the Central Valley.)	
Redding	KRDT-CD	23	KKRM-LD		
Redding	K19NH-D	27	KUCO-LD		
Redding	K33HH-D	33	KBLN-TV		
Redding	K29OI-D	51	KKRM-LD		
Ridgecrest	K22NA-D	2	KCBS-TV	(Note: Licensed to Inyokern, California.)	
Ridgecrest	K25PL-D	4	KNBC		
Ridgecrest	K27NX-D	5	KTLA		
Ridgecrest	K30QC-D	7	KABC-TV		
Ridgecrest	K21IN-D	9	KCAL-TV		
Ridgecrest	K33ID-D	13	KCOP-TV		
Ridgecrest	K20LH-D	18; 50	KSCI; KOCE-TV		
Ridgecrest	K19IS-D	21	KZGN-LD		
Ridgecrest	K32NA-D	28	KCET		
Ridgecrest	K17HY-D	34	KMEX-DT		
Ridgecrest	K16JW-D	41	K31MB-D		
Ridgecrest	K15HJ-D	46	KFTR-DT		
Ridgecrest	K14AT-D	52	KVEA		
Ridgecrest	K24ON-D	54	KHTV-CD		
Ridgecrest	K23IS-D	56	KDOC-TV		
Sacramento	K06QL-D	15	KQSL		
Sacramento	KEZT-CD	23	KUVS-DT		
Sacramento	KMMW-LD	33	KCSO-LD		
Sacramento	KMUM-CD	33	KCSO-LD		
Sacramento	K02QP-D	45	KQSL	(Note: Licensed to Chowchilla, California.)	
San Diego	KZSD-LP	10	KGTV		
San Diego	KHAX-LD	17	KBNT-LD	(Note: Licensed to Vista, California.)	
San Diego	KRPE-LD	23	KFMB-TV 8.2		
San Francisco	K15FJ-D	15	KQSL	(Note: Licensed to Lakeport, California.)	
San Francisco	KDTV-CD	28	KDTV-DT		
San Francisco	KDAS-LD	52	KDTS-LD		
San Luis Obispo	K26MT-D	3	KEYT-TV	(Note: Licensed to Paso Robles, California.)	
San Luis Obispo	K31KE-D	3	KEYT-TV		
San Luis Obispo	K10OG-D	10	KPMR		
San Luis Obispo	K16FC-D	16	KCET		
San Luis Obispo	K17GD-D	17	KPMR		
San Luis Obispo	KKFX-CD	24	KCOY-TV		
San Luis Obispo	K32LT-D	28	KPMR		
San Luis Obispo	KTSB-CD	35	KPMR 38.3		
San Luis Obispo	KFUL-LD	57	KJLA		
Santa Barbara	K10PV-D	6	KSBY		
Santa Barbara	KSBB-CD	17	KEYT-TV 3.3		
Santa Barbara	K26FT-D	26	KCET		
Santa Barbara	K33QS-D	28	KCET		
Santa Barbara	KBAB-LD	31; 50	KSCI; KOCE-TV		
Susanville	K17HE-D	2	KTVN		
Susanville	K31IE-D	4	KRNV-DT		
Susanville	K34KK-D	5	KNPB		
Susanville	K36HH-D	5	KNPB		
Susanville	K25OT-D	8	KOLO-TV		
Susanville	K32MJ-D	11	KRXI-TV		
Susanville	K29LT-D	11	KRXI-TV		
Susanville	K27NE-D	21	KNSN-TV		
Twentynine Palms	K16LB-D	9	KCAL-TV	(Note: Licensed to Yucca Valley, California.)	
Twentynine Palms	K15FC-D	15	KCBS-TV; KNBC; KTLA; KCET		
Twentynine Palms	K17GJ-D	17	KCAL-TV; KTTV; KCOP-TV; KMIR-TV 36.2		
Twentynine Palms	K29GK-D	29	KDOC-TV; KESQ-TV		
Twentynine Palms	K30GU-D	30	KCOP-TV; KCBS-TV; KTLA; KSCI		
Twentynine Palms	K32EM-D	32	KCAL-TV; KESQ-TV; KTTV		
Twentynine Palms	K34EU-D	34	KMIR-TV 36.2; KDOC-TV; KNBC		
Ukiah	K17CG-D	3	KCRA-TV		
Ukiah	K27EE-D	5	KPIX-TV		
Ukiah	K21CD-D	7	KGO-TV		
Ukiah	K31GK-D	9	KQED		
Yreka	K34OW-D	5	KOBI		
Yreka	K19GL-D	9	KIXE-TV		
Yreka	K18LJ-D	10	KTVL	(Note: Licensed to Dunsmuir, California.)	
Yreka	K30JS-D	10	KTVL		
Yreka	K17BA-D	12	KDRV		
Yreka	K32LQ-D	26; 48	KMVU-DT; KFBI-LD		
Yreka	K36NY-D	30	KBLN-TV		
~Yuma, AZ	K29LS-D	42	XHILA-TDT	(Note: Licensed to Calexico, California.)	
~Yuma, AZ	K11XU-D	48	KECY-TV 9.4		
~Carson City, NV	K14SD-D	11	KRXI-TV	(Note: Licensed to South Lake Tahoe, California.)	
~Carson City, NV	K34QQ-D	11; 21	KRXI-TV; KNSN-TV	(Note: Licensed to Tahoe City, California.)	
~Laughlin, NV	K17BN-D	10	KSAZ-TV		
~Laughlin, NV	K31HY-D	15	KNXV-TV		
~Klamath Falls, OR	K08OB-D	9	KIXE-TV	(Note: Licensed to Newell, California.)	
~Klamath Falls, OR	K20DE-D	9	KIXE-TV	(Note: Licensed to Alturas, California.)	

== Defunct ==
- KBID-TV Fresno (1954–1954)
- KCCC-TV Sacramento (1953–1957)
- KCFT-TV Concord (1966–1966)
- KCHU San Bernardino (1962–1964)
- KDAS Hanford–Fresno (1962–1964)
- KEEF-TV Los Angeles (1987)
- KHOF-TV Glendale (1969–1983)
- KICU-TV Visalia–Fresno (1961–1968)
- KKOG-TV Ventura (1968–1969)
- KMBY-TV Monterey (1953–1955; shared time with KSBW-TV)
- KNEW-TV San Francisco (1968–1971)
- KQEC San Francisco (1971–1972 and 1977–1988)
- KSAN-TV San Francisco (1954–1958, 1966–1968)
- KSJV-TV Hanford–Fresno (1966–1966)
- KTHE Los Angeles (1953–1954)
- KTVU Stockton (1953–1955)
- KUDO San Francisco (1968–1971)
- KVOF-TV San Francisco (1974–1985)
- KVST-TV Los Angeles (1974–1975)
- KVUE Sacramento (1959–1960)
- KVVG Tulare–Fresno (1953–1957)

== See also ==
- List of television stations in the San Francisco Bay Area
- Television stations in Baja California
