= KVPT =

Television station in Fresno, California

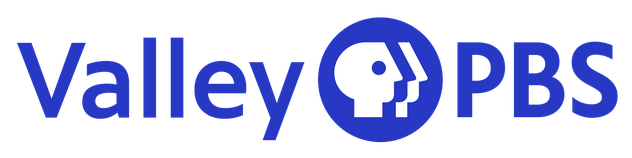
- Fresno–Bakersfield, California; United States
- City: Fresno, California
- Channels: Digital: 32 (UHF); Virtual: 18
- Branding: Valley PBS

Programming
- Affiliations: 18.1: PBS; for others, see § Subchannels

Ownership
- Owner: Valley Public Television, Inc.

History
- First air date: April 10, 1977
- Former call signs: KMTF (1977–1990)
- Former channel numbers: Analog: 18 (UHF, 1977–2009); Digital: 40 (UHF, 2004–2018)
- Call sign meaning: Valley Public Television

Technical information
- Licensing authority: FCC
- Facility ID: 69733
- ERP: 281 kW
- HAAT: 653.1 m (2,143 ft)
- Transmitter coordinates: 36°44′45.2″N 119°17′2.4″W
- Translator(s): K18HD-D Bakersfield

Links
- Public license information: Public file; LMS
- Website: valleypbs.org

KVPT (channel 18) is a PBS member television station in Fresno, California, United States, owned by Valley Public Television, Inc. Its studios are located on Van Ness Avenue and Calaveras Street in downtown Fresno, and its transmitter is located on Bear Mountain, near Meadow Lakes, California. It is also broadcast in Bakersfield on translator K18HD-D.

The drive to build a public television station in Fresno had lasted nearly 25 years before channel 18 signed on as KMTF in April 1977. After several false starts, an application led by the Fresno County school board and overseen by the school systems of Kings, Madera, Tulare, and Fresno counties—the station's original namesake—put the station on the air, overcoming delays relating to fundraising and an objection by a Mexican American group. In 1987, ownership of the station was spun off by the school board into a community non-profit organization, today known as Valley Public Television. KMTF changed its call sign to KVPT in 1990; that year, it also moved into its present studios, donated by commercial station KSEE. In 1992, it began broadcasting into Bakersfield. The station had one general manager for its first 26 years of operation, but in the 2010s and early 2020s, KVPT has experienced increased management turnover.

== Establishing public television in Fresno ==
Efforts to start a public TV station on Fresno's educational channel 18 stretched nearly 25 years from the time the station began broadcasting in 1977.

In December 1952, a meeting was held by the Fresno Area Council on Educational Television to discuss possible use of ultra high frequency (UHF) channel 18. A 1953 meeting recommended the creation of a nonprofit corporation to serve as the licensee and apply for construction. No action had been taken by 1955, when the existence of the channel became an issue in the battle over intermixture of VHF and UHF allocations in the city; KJEO-TV recommended the educational reservation be switched from channel 18 to a very high frequency (VHF) channel, while KBID on channel 53 sought to move to the lower channels of 18 or 30.

Educational television plans for Fresno lay fallow until a 1958 attempt by the local chapter of the American Association of University Women, which led to the 1959 formation of the San Joaquin Valley Community Television Association. This group, unlike the prior effort, supported the idea of switching the educational reservation in Fresno to channel 12 if the Federal Communications Commission (FCC) moved KFRE-TV from channel 12 to channel 30.

In 1963, the San Joaquin Valley Community Television Association announced possible plans for a fundraising drive to support the construction of a station. The next year, it began planning to raise $200,000 in order to qualify for federal matching grants that would finance construction of channel 18. These efforts gained some steam in late 1964 and early 1965: Fresno State College was authorized to collaborate with the group, allowing it to use the college's TV facilities in lieu of constructing its own studio, and in January 1965, applications were filed with the FCC for a construction permit and with the Department of Health, Education, and Welfare (HEW) for federal money. However, this proposal stalled out because of an inability to raise the necessary cash in the community. School systems outside of Fresno County were indifferent to the educational television project, and business leaders made pledges contingent on starting construction. Federal money was then diverted from educational broadcasting to social priorities and the Vietnam War. A February 13, 1966, headline on the front page of The Fresno Bee read, "ETV Campaign In Valley Appears Lost Cause".

The next effort to activate channel 18 came from Fresno State College. In June 1967, the board of trustees of the California State University system, which governed the college, authorized plans for an educational TV station on the campus; the college then asked the FCC to let it assume the existing channel 18 application from the San Joaquin Valley Community Television Association. However, its plans remained plans because of cutbacks to state funding. In 1971, the associated Fresno State College Foundation rejected a proposal to turn KAIL (channel 53) into an educational station, unsure if it was empowered to run such a venture.

== History ==
=== Application ===
The Fresno County Department of Education began a study in late 1972 over the feasibility of expanding its closed-circuit instructional television system. However, the study found that money could be better used by setting up a broadcast station. Ernest Poore, the superintendent of the county school system, then told a meeting of educators in late August that he would recommend the department of education move forward with channel 18 planning. A proposed program schedule featured 66 hours of programming a week, mostly from PBS and local productions. As the application was filed in December 1973, however, concerns were raised about how much control educational groups would have over the station as well as the station's plans to hire minorities.

Another concern over control emerged in early 1974. Unsatisfied by the plans put forth by Fresno County, the superintendent of schools in Tulare County proposed a second public station which would serve Tulare, Kern, Kings, and Madera counties, including Bakersfield. This surprised Poore and the Fresno County group. The proposed channel 43 station also threatened funding, given that changes in priorities at HEW pushed Fresno down the list of possible grantees. Tulare County proposed a different transmitter site for channel 18 which could have meant an extra year's delay in constructing the station. Ultimately, the other counties withdrew their proposal and backed the Fresno channel 18 plan.

HEW accepted the channel 18 funding application in May 1974, but a new group arose in opposition to the plans. The Television Advisory Committee of Mexican Americans (TACOMA) objected to the proposed programming and a lack of Hispanics on the citizens' advisory board. HEW turned down the application at its first opportunity to fund it, in June, because of the TACOMA objection. The school board and TACOMA negotiated through the summer, but TACOMA withdrew from negotiations in early August and accused Poore and others of disregarding their "sincere" efforts. TACOMA and the National Organization for Women (NOW) disapproved of Fresno County's proposed governing board, split between educators and racial minorities; TACOMA's proposal of giving minorities 13 of 23 seats was also rejected by NOW as ignoring women. As a result of the pending objection, HEW passed on funding channel 18 again in September 1974.

Over the first seven months of 1975, however, the various obstacles for the station were cleared. HEW endorsed the proposed board in January 1975; TACOMA's application was dismissed in June at its request, allowing HEW to approve the $430,000 grant; and the FCC awarded a construction permit on July 10. However, the delay of a year at a time of high inflation increased construction costs by $100,000.

=== Construction ===
With the construction permit in hand, work began on raising matching funds. One large item was donated. That summer, KFSN-TV moved into a new studio facility and offered to allow channel 18 to move into the old one on L Street. The ability to use the former KFSN-TV studio would also allow channel 18 to be housed separately from the Fresno County education department. Meanwhile, the school board also had to pick call letters. Its first choice of call sign, KFTM, was already assigned in Fort Morgan, Colorado; of the combinations including the four counties involved in operations, only KMTF (Kings, Madera, Tulare, Fresno) was available.

The fundraising campaign officially began in September, though it moved slowly. By March, Poore had told The Bee that donation totals were disappointing, citing conflicts with other charitable fundraising efforts and confusion as to whether channel 18 would be a cable service. However, by the end of April, the fund drive had raised $82,000, a third of the way toward its $250,000 goal. Donations surpassed $100,000 in May, and a 27-hour telethon hosted by commercial independent station KMPH-TV (channel 26, now a Fox affiliate) in June raised another $50,000.

Equipment began to arrive at Bear Mountain in the final months of 1976. The first tranche of equipment had been purchased with part of the HEW grant and local funds. Even though the fund drive still needed to raise $46,000, enough money had been secured to build KMTF, though without the ability to broadcast local programs in color. Colin Dougherty, a former KJEO-TV newsman, was appointed by the school board to be the station's first manager.

=== Early years ===
Shortly before noon on April 10, 1977, KMTF officially began broadcasting. The first local program, interview show Studio 18, debuted three days later. With KMTF broadcasting, the station's first pledge drive brought in $60,000; station officials noted that there had been so many false starts for public television in Fresno that many people had shied away from donating until the station was operating.

Channel 18 faced its first operating deficit in 1985 due to increased costs; several layoffs were conducted as well as a special fundraising event. During that time, there were other failures: a $1 million drive for a new building failed, and the station had to pay for associated fundraising costs from its operating fund, and longtime volunteers Shirley and Lex Connolly died in a 1984 plane crash, which Dougherty called "a very down time".

=== From school board to community ===
The Fresno County school board in 1987 spun KMTF off into a non-profit organization, KMTF, Inc. The formation of the tax-exempt group allowed channel 18 to remove itself from the jurisdiction of the county's Education Code. Dougherty noted that he could not even provide free coffee to volunteers because it was considered a public gift, while the organizational connection to the school board made some donors reluctant because they believed that local school systems defrayed its expenses. KMTF, Inc. had a nine-member governing board consisting of representatives of each of the four counties in its service area.

Where previous capital fundraising efforts had failed, in January 1988, KMTF received two buildings, one donated and the other leased by Meredith Corporation, then-owner of Fresno commercial station KSEE, which was moving to a new facility. This allowed KMTF to move out of the increasingly cramped L Street building, which had once served as a cheese factory. The city of Fresno then bought the L Street facility and demolished it to provide parking near the Fresno Convention Center. On March 1, 1990, KMTF changed its call letters to KVPT and its corporate name to Valley Public Television, Inc., as part of a campaign to emphasize a more consistent, regional brand.

Station officials first floated the idea of building a translator in Kern County in 1984, when station manager Dougherty met with a Bakersfield group about the idea. However, the station and KCET in Los Angeles presented conflicting proposals, not only for a Bakersfield station but for the purchase of KNXT (channel 49), the Visalia-licensed educational station owned by the Roman Catholic Diocese of Fresno which the diocese sought to sell at that time. Dougherty saw KCET as rapacious and noted that it "want[ed] to eat the entire state". In 1992, KVPT received federal permission to build a translator on channel 65. That did not end the battle between the two stations, which then each filed to build a full-power station on Bakersfield's channel 39. Bakersfield residents, who historically received KCET on cable, had mixed opinions on whether a Fresno station or a Los Angeles station was more aligned with the interests of the southern San Joaquin Valley. In August 1993, KVPT and KCET jointly agreed to avoid a lengthy comparative hearing process and serve Bakersfield exclusively by translator.

The 1990s were a time of equipment renewal at KVPT, even with budget-tightening measures such as discontinuing a printed program guide and some layoffs. The station had only a handful of local programs, which The Bee columnist Lanny Larson called "visually unappealing" and in need of a refresh. In 1996, to convince donors that it needed to replace equipment, the station aired a special program, Please Stand By, to demonstrate issues with its facilities; after 20 years, a new transmitter was installed in 1997. After it inherited a share of the estate of William Robert Perry, it honored his wish by raffling off a 1961 Rolls-Royce Silver Cloud automobile.

=== Into the digital era ===
After 26 years as the station's only general manager, Colin Dougherty retired in 2003, estimating he had helped raise some $75 million for channel 18 in its lifetime. One of the station's longest-running local programs, the public affairs show Valley Press, ended in 2008; Jim Tucker, who had been its only host since 1989, retired after 675 editions.

To replace the Bakersfield translator on channel 65, which was being removed from television use with the transition from analog to digital broadcasts, KVPT bid on a low-power station on channel 19 in 2000. Pappas Telecasting (owner of KMPH-TV) provided financial support, and a company controlled by Harry J. Pappas—a longtime supporter of the station, dating back to when his KMPH-TV hosted the telethon prior to its first broadcast—purchased the channel 19 construction permit and channel 65 so that KVPT could attempt to acquire channel 39. Due to a dispute over rent payments, Valley Public Television moved to channel 34 in 2004; unable to acquire channel 39, it sued Pappas seeking judgment on a $488,000 promissory note and won favorable judgment in superior court. The present Bakersfield translator, K18HD, was acquired from Michael Mintz in 2007.

KVPT began broadcasting a digital signal on September 1, 2004; by 2007, the station was offering three subchannels, including the Spanish-language V-me. The station shut down its analog signal on February 17, 2009, the original digital transition target date; it continued to broadcast in digital on its pre-transition UHF channel 40, using virtual channel 18. On September 27, 2010, KVPT altered its branding to "Valley PBS". V-me was discontinued in 2017, when the station launched a PBS Kids subchannel.

KVPT relocated its signal from channel 40 to channel 32 in 2018 as a result of the 2016 United States wireless spectrum auction.

I have observed from afar the dizzying exit of talented and experienced staff, including the CEO and CFO, fundraisers, producers, cameramen, engineers, marketers, education and children’s services providers, and other support staff, out the door, either fired or left of their own volition, because "they just couldn’t take it anymore".

— Phyllis Brotherton, on turnover at KVPT since 2019

The 2010s and early 2020s also saw significant management turnover at KVPT. Paula Castadio, who had replaced Dougherty upon his retirement, left in 2014 for a position at Fresno State University. The next CEO, Phil Meyer, lasted just two years. In December 2018, former KSEE and KGPE anchor Jenny Toste was named as Valley PBS's fourth CEO. Seven months later, the board of directors terminated her contract. After Toste resigned, the station hemorrhaged staff through a combination of layoffs and departures amid low morale. The next CEO, Lorenzo Rios, was described by employees as presiding over a "toxic work environment" and military-style management; one employee objected to a contract Rios asked him to sign pledging to carry out "duty to God and country". Rios exited abruptly in April 2021 and was replaced by interim CEO Jeff Aiello. The turnover led former interim CEO and employee Phyllis Brotherton to publish an op-ed in the Visalia Times Delta calling for a course correction at the station. A 2023 audit by the Corporation for Public Broadcasting inspector general found that Valley PBS overstated revenues received from sources beyond the federal government and failed to file required reports, resulting in an overpayment of $214,000 in grants over a two-year period. Aiello announced in May 2024 that he would depart upon the naming of his successor.

The KVPT transmitter site at Bear Mountain was destroyed by a wildfire on June 25, 2024. Valley PBS announced that their primary subchannel had returned to air on July 3 after KGMC in Merced agreed to host it. KVPT resumed transmissions from Bear Mountain at reduced power on June 22, 2025, before returning to full power the next month.

== Structure and funding ==
KVPT is led by a 16-member governing board, though some positions have been unfilled in recent years; in August 2021, the board had just six members. In 2022, the station had revenue of $3.95 million; it received $1 million in funding from the Corporation for Public Broadcasting as well as $2.2 million in nonfederal financial support, primarily from nearly 10,000 contributors.

== Local programming ==
In addition to national educational and cultural programming from PBS, KVPT produces programs about local and regional issues and agricultural topics, including the series Valley's Gold and American Grown: My Job Depends on Ag. There is no regular public affairs program; the station has not produced one since the mid-2010s.

== Technical information ==
=== Subchannels ===
KVPT's transmitter is located on Bear Mountain, near Meadow Lakes, California. The station's signal is multiplexed:

Subchannels of KVPT
Subchannel	Res.	Short name	Programming
18.1	1080i	KVPT-HD	PBS
18.2	480i	KVPT-D1	PBS Kids
18.3	480i	KVPT-D2	Create
18.4	480i	KVPT-D3	World
