= KSEE =

Television station in Fresno, California

- Fresno, California; United States
- Channels: Digital: 20 (UHF); Virtual: 24
- Branding: KSEE 24

Programming
- Affiliations: 24.1: NBC; for others, see § Subchannels

Ownership
- Owner: Nexstar Media Group; (Nexstar Media Inc.)
- Sister stations: KGPE

History
- First air date: May 31, 1953
- Former call signs: KMJ-TV (1953–1981)
- Former channel numbers: Analog: 24 (UHF, 1953–2009); Digital: 16 (UHF, 2002–2005), 38 (UHF, 2005–2020)
- Former affiliations: CBS (secondary, 1953–1956)

Technical information
- Licensing authority: FCC
- Facility ID: 35594
- ERP: 221 kW
- HAAT: 601.1 m (1,972 ft)
- Transmitter coordinates: 37°4′14″N 119°25′34″W

Links
- Public license information: Public file; LMS
- Website: www.yourcentralvalley.com

KSEE (channel 24) is a television station in Fresno, California, United States, affiliated with NBC. It is owned by Nexstar Media Group alongside CBS affiliate KGPE (channel 47). The two stations share studios on McKinley Avenue in eastern Fresno; KSEE's transmitter is located on Bear Mountain (near Meadow Lakes).

KSEE began broadcasting as KMJ-TV, the first television station in Fresno, on May 31, 1953. It was owned by McClatchy Newspapers, alongside The Fresno Bee and KMJ radio, and was the market's leading station for most of McClatchy's ownership. However, the company owning the major daily newspaper in Fresno, its leading radio station, and its leading television station led to legal scrutiny in the 1970s and a five-year battle by local investors known as San Joaquin Communications Corporation to attempt to wrest the license from McClatchy. McClatchy opted to sell to the investors in 1979. While a deal was completed in 1981, they soon sold the station for financial reasons. Nexstar acquired KSEE in 2013, shortly after purchasing KGPE, and moved the latter station's operations into the former's studio building. KSEE produces daily newscasts as well as other local programs.

== History ==
=== KMJ-TV: Early years ===
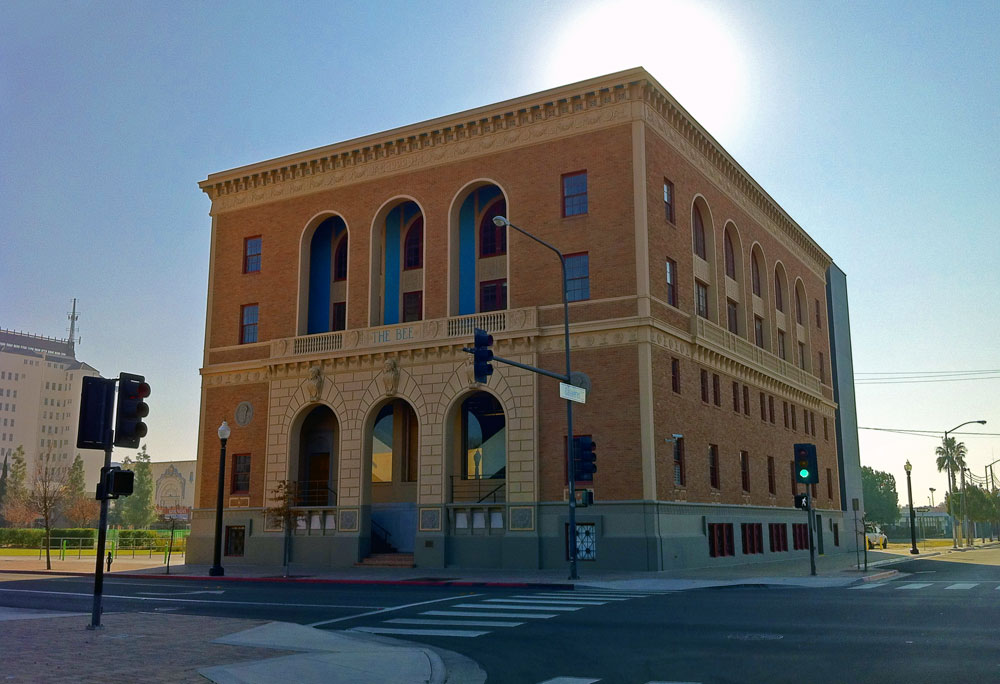
KMJ-TV signed on from the Fresno Bee Building downtown.

McClatchy Newspapers, owner of The Fresno Bee and KMJ radio (580 AM), sought to enter the world of television as early as May 1948, when it applied for authority to build television stations on channel 7 in Fresno and channel 10 in Sacramento. However, before the applications were acted on, the Federal Communications Commission (FCC) instituted a four-year freeze on television station awards. Channel 7 was removed from Fresno, and McClatchy modified its application to specify channel 24 in the new ultra high frequency (UHF) band.

On September 18, 1952, the FCC granted McClatchy a construction permit for Fresno's channel 24, the first such permit awarded in California since the freeze was lifted. Work began immediately on building Fresno's first television station. In December, the McClatchy Broadcasting Company purchased the former Fresno Ice Arena on Olive Avenue with the intent to convert it to studios (with The Bee's auditorium to be used as an interim facility), while 28 miles (45 km) east of Fresno on Bear Mountain, the station's transmitter was erected. McClatchy also commissioned Walt Disney to design a cartoon bee mascot for KMJ-TV, "Teevy", to accompany the previous Disney designs of "Scoopy" and "Gaby", which were used as mascots for the Bee and the radio stations, respectively.

A test pattern was broadcast on May 26, 1953; an inaugural program was presented on May 31 with regular programming beginning the following day, using an interim lower-power transmitter as RCA could not deliver the full-power equipment in time. KMJ-TV aired programs from all networks and became a primary NBC affiliate, sharing CBS with KJEO-TV (channel 47) when it went on the air in September 1953 and until KFRE-TV started in 1956. In September 1954, KMJ-TV began transmitting NBC programs in color. After moving to facilities on N Street in 1956, a new studio facility was built near the Bee complex on the corner of Van Ness Avenue and Calaveras Street in 1959; The Bee's circulation department was also relocated there, across the street, as the newspaper outgrew existing office space.

=== San Joaquin Communications Corporation: The long fight ===
The history of McClatchy's television undertakings was altered significantly in the 1970s by a problem that had been present nearly from the start. Like in Fresno, McClatchy had filed in 1948 to build a TV station on channel 10 in Sacramento, where it published The Sacramento Bee and owned radio station KFBK. Unlike in Fresno, however, a competing applicant applied for channel 10 after the FCC freeze was lifted. Sacramento Telecasters objected to an initial decision by an FCC hearing examiner favoring McClatchy's proposal for the Sacramento station on grounds that McClatchy already owned too many mass media outlets in the city and that the decision ran counter to FCC policy favoring diversification of media ownership. The FCC agreed with Sacramento Telecasters in October 1954 and awarded it the construction permit for KBET-TV, though McClatchy exhausted its appeals until February 1958.

In 1964, McClatchy acquired KOVR, a station in Stockton that also served Sacramento. The transaction had attracted scrutiny for potentially creating a "monopoly of news", and a court challenge to McClatchy's ownership of the station was filed in 1969 and abandoned in 1971.

When KMJ-TV's broadcast license came up for renewal in November 1974, San Joaquin Communications Corporation (SJCC), a company led by R. W. "Duke" Millard and owned by local investors, filed a competing application to establish a channel 24 station with the FCC. SJCC contended that McClatchy had "great concentration of control" and was "a monolithic media giant" as a result of its newspaper, radio, and television holdings in Fresno. A group representing local Mexican Americans also objected to the KMJ-TV license; McClatchy defended its community service record and expressed confidence that KMJ-TV's license would be renewed. The United States Department of Justice Antitrust Division also lodged a petition with the commission asking it to order the breakup of McClatchy's Fresno media holdings due to the dominance of The Bee, the main daily newspaper, and the radio and television stations. As evidence, federal attorneys noted that the Bee–KMJ combination commanded 80.4 percent of the advertising revenue in Fresno media as of 1972.

While the FCC accepted a citizens' agreement with the Mexican American group in July 1975, and it dismissed the Justice Department opposition in 1976, the SJCC application continued to simmer as attitudes on cross-ownership of mass media entered the national spotlight. In response to a federal appeals court ordering divestitures of such combinations, in 1977, McClatchy proposed to trade KOVR to Multimedia, Inc. for WFBC-TV in Greenville, South Carolina; SJCC opposed the deal and refused to rescind its petition to deny, contributing to its cancellation after a year in pending status.

In April 1978, ten days of hearings were held comparing the record and proposals of McClatchy's KMJ-TV and those of San Joaquin Communications Corporation. SJCC officials sought to highlight that the public service activities of KMJ television were influenced by the KMJ radio stations and McClatchy itself, while McClatchy defended its viewership and record by noting that channel 24 was the most-watched station in most time periods and that it enjoyed a comparatively favorable reputation. More rounds of hearings were held in Washington, D.C., and Fresno during 1978, with technical and antitrust issues at play. SJCC charged that McClatchy had aggressively investigated the backgrounds of its members and went as far as to destroy taped conversations about the topic. Representations about transmitter sites and finances and the possibility of upgraded KMJ-TV transmitting facilities overlapping with those of KOVR were also discussed in the marathon sessions. Dayle Molen, whose coverage of the hearings appeared in The Bee, noted that for the teams of attorneys from Washington, "Their principal recreation was sampling the cuisine of various Fresno restaurants."

=== KSEE: SJCC and Meredith ownership ===
Four and a half years of legal wrangling unexpectedly ended in May 1979, when McClatchy announced it would sell KMJ-TV to SJCC for $13.5 million to avoid a continued legal burden and as many as five or six more years of hearings and appeals. The KMJ radio stations would remain under McClatchy ownership. The company then decided to put KOVR, its only other television station, up for sale; citing "increasingly strong government opposition" to cross-ownership, president C. K. McClatchy II noted that he felt it was in the community interest to ensure an "orderly transition" of ownership at that station.

However, an unexpected obstacle formed in November when six different social activist groups filed petitions to deny the transfer, largely because they felt that the station's new owners would not have an adequate editorial policy. National Land for People, the Women's International League for Peace and Freedom, the Mexican-American Political Association, the United Professors of California, the Fresno Democratic Coalition, and El Concilio de Fresno objected to the presence of several large landowners in SJCC's ownership consortium; several of the groups, notably National Land for People, were already contesting these landowners in the Westlands Water District for their use of water. Despite a story in The Wall Street Journal that suggested The Bee shelved a story about SJCC principal Frank Garabedian that would have linked him to a bribery scheme in order to protect the transaction, the FCC granted approval to the transaction on November 18, 1980.

SJCC took control of KMJ-TV on January 28, 1981. One month later, the station changed its call sign to KSEE on February 27. As it turned out, the time it spent obtaining the station—more than six years—dwarfed the time it actually owned it. The investments made by the SJCC principals were rewarded with financial reverses, partly because NBC was the third-rated television network at the time of the acquisition, as well as increased capital requirements. As a result, when three station groups made unsolicited overtures to purchase KSEE in January 1982, San Joaquin Communications listened and entered into negotiations with the Meredith Corporation to sell channel 24. The deal was announced and filed with the FCC that August for $17.6 million.

The Meredith transaction also faced objections before the FCC, from a Black group over minority hiring practices and the same Mexican American group for similar reasons, but the groups negotiated a settlement agreement with Meredith in April 1983, withdrawing their opposition. Meredith took over operations the next month, promising improvements in programming and news. It also began a two-year search for a site to relocate and build new studios; in 1985, KSEE announced it would construct a facility near the Fresno Air Terminal. These studios opened in 1987, and Fresno's public television station, KMTF (now KVPT), moved into the former KSEE plant.

=== Granite ownership ===
In 1993, Meredith sold two of its stations—KSEE and WTVH in Syracuse, New York—to Granite Broadcasting, a Black-owned company in New York; the transaction gave Meredith tax certificates for selling stations to a minority. The sale was closed that December.

Granite assumed advertising sales functions for KPXF, the local Pax TV owned-and-operated station, under a joint sales agreement in 2000; in addition, KPXF reaired KSEE newscasts. This ended in March 2003 when the sale of KPXF to Univision and conversion to Telefutura as KTFF took place.

=== Sale to Nexstar and merger with KGPE ===
On February 6, 2013, Granite sold KSEE's non-license assets to the Nexstar Broadcasting Group, with Nexstar also intending to purchase KSEE's license following Federal Communications Commission approval; in the interim, Nexstar operated the station via a time brokerage agreement. The deal made KSEE a sister station to CBS affiliate KGPE (the former KJEO-TV), which Nexstar had just acquired from Newport Television. While most duopolies of Big Four or Big Three network affiliates contain two of the four highest-rated stations in the market and are usually not permissible, Nexstar presented viewership figures showing that Univision station KFTV was second in the market, with KGPE fourth and KSEE fifth, making the combination legal. (Note: Such combinations under outright ownership are rare. The first example was the combination of NBC affiliate WTLV and ABC affiliate WJXX in Jacksonville, Florida, in 2000; WJXX rated fifth in that market at the time. In most combinations in which Nexstar operates a second Big Four station, that station is owned by another company, such as Mission Broadcasting.) The purchase was approved on April 17 and completed by May 31.

After acquiring KSEE and KGPE, Nexstar moved to consolidate the operations of both stations by relocating KGPE into KSEE's larger facilities and renovating the building. New high definition-capable studios were built for the two stations, and the KSEE Building was renamed the McKinley Media Center.

== Local programming ==
=== News operation ===
Dean Mell, KMJ-TV's first newscaster, recalled in 1985 that the station's news operation at the outset focused entirely on gathering local news, with only two cameramen on the news staff along with Mell. National and international film was supplied by the Movietone News newsreels and flown in daily; if fog developed in Fresno, footage might be seen days late.

KMJ-TV and KFSN-TV generally traded leadership in news ratings through the late 1970s, but the latter took a dominant lead in the market by the end of the decade thanks to a new anchor pairing. Channel 24, however, was first in the area with live reports in its newscasts, in 1980.

By the time of Meredith's purchase in 1983, however, KSEE was described as a station "in dire need of repair". Meredith dispatched Ken Coy, an anchor and news director at its KPHO-TV in Phoenix, to Fresno to lead the KSEE news department. Several changes were made on the news staff, including the firing of two on-air personalities. Coy remained at the station for the rest of the decade, including two years where he served as news anchor in addition to running the newsroom. Ratings stabilized at second, behind KFSN but ahead of KJEO. The station also won a Peabody Award for its 1994 report "The Atomic Bombshell", in which Dale Julin uncovered a radiation hazard resulting from a 1950 military plane crash. KSEE's news ratings generally remained in second place in the 2000s, with a noted downturn late in the decade.

On September 3, 2002, KSEE launched a half-hour 4 p.m. newscast, the market's first; the program was retooled in 2011 into a lifestyle and news program, We Are Fresno Live. Between 2006 and 2009, KSEE produced a newscast at 10 p.m. for MyNetworkTV affiliate KAIL.

In April 2013, prior to the merger of KSEE and KGPE's news departments, the two stations began sharing reporters and photographers, but they continued to maintain separate on-air talent. Both stations relaunched their news products in October 2013, with KSEE newscasts being refocused to cover "local news that matters" and several changes in the schedule including the cancellation of We Are Fresno Live and changes in the timing of some other newscasts to reduce overlap to KGPE.

==== Notable former on-air staff ====
- Caroline Collins – anchor
- Mike Hill – sports anchor/reporter (1995–1997)
- Raj Mathai – sports anchor/reporter (1997–1998); was known as Roger Mathai in Fresno

=== Sports programming ===
KSEE launched Bulldog Insider, a weekly magazine program covering athletics at Fresno State University, in 2007.

Since 2022, KSEE airs 11 Los Angeles Clippers regular season games a year syndicated from Nexstar sister station KTLA.

=== Other local programming ===
In 2003, KSEE debuted a medical discussion program titled MedWatch, which aired Saturdays at 6:30 p.m.; the program, hosted by longtime anchor Cindy Suryan, focused on medical and health topics as well as breakthroughs in medical technology, it was canceled in 2009 but was later revived in 2019 as MedWatch Today. In September 2007, KSEE debuted an hour-long business/entertainment show, Central Valley Today; originally airing at 11 a.m., the program moved to 3 p.m. on October 30, 2013.

== Technical information ==
=== Subchannels ===
KSEE's transmitter is located on Bear Mountain (near Meadow Lakes). The station's signal is multiplexed:

Subchannels of KSEE
Subchannel	Res.	Short name	Programming
24.1	1080i	KSEE-HD	NBC
24.2	480i	Bounce	Bounce TV
24.3	480i	Grit	Grit
24.4	480i	Rewind	Rewind TV
26.4	720p	FOX26	Fox (KMPH-TV via KFRE-DT4)

Broadcast on behalf of another station

The 26.4 subchannel is hosted on KSEE as part of Fresno's ATSC 3.0 (NextGen TV) deployment, launched June 2022, in which Nexstar is a participant.

KSEE ended regular programming on its analog signal, over UHF channel 24, on June 12, 2009, the official date on which full-power television stations in the United States transitioned from analog to digital broadcasts under federal mandate. The station's digital signal remained on its pre-transition UHF channel 38, using virtual channel 24; the analog signal remained on the air until June 19 to provide transition information as part of the SAFER Act, The station was then moved to channel 20 in the 10th and final phase of the repack in 2020.
