= KGMC (TV) =

Television station in Merced, California

- Merced–Fresno, California; United States
- City: Merced, California
- Channels: Digital: 11 (VHF); Virtual: 43
- Branding: Estrella TV Fresno; MeTV Fresno (43.6)

Programming
- Affiliations: 43.1: Estrella TV; for others, see § Subchannels

Ownership
- Owner: Cocola Broadcasting Companies LLC
- Sister stations: KBNK-LD; KHSC-LD; KJKZ-LD; KKDJ-CD; KMSG-LD; KSDI-LD; KVHF-LD; KVVG-LD

History
- First air date: March 22, 1996
- Former call signs: KNSO (1996–2020)
- Former channel numbers: Analog: 51 (UHF, 1996–2009); Digital: 5 (VHF, 2002–2010); Virtual: 51 (until 2020)
- Former affiliations: Independent (1996–1998); The WB (1998–2000); Telemundo (2001–2020); Ion Television (DT3, 2018–2020)
- Call sign meaning: Gary Morris Cocola (name of owner)

Technical information
- Licensing authority: FCC
- Facility ID: 58608
- ERP: 45 kW
- HAAT: 589 m (1,932 ft)
- Transmitter coordinates: 37°4′26.8″N 119°25′56.8″W

Links
- Public license information: Public file; LMS

KGMC (channel 43) is a television station licensed to Merced, California, United States, serving the Fresno area as an affiliate of the Spanish-language network Estrella TV. It is the flagship television property of owner Cocola Broadcasting, and is sister to eight low-power stations. KGMC's studios are located on West Herndon Avenue in the Pinedale area of Fresno, and its transmitter is located on Bald Mountain, south of Meadow Lakes in Fresno County.

A live simulcast of some of KGMC's non-network programming can be seen on the Cocola Broadcasting homepage.

== History ==
The station first signed on the air on March 22, 1996, as KNSO on channel 51; originally operating as an independent station, it was owned by Sainte Partners II, L.P. During its first two years on the air, KNSO aired religious programming during the morning and Asian language programming in the afternoons, as well as programming from the California Music Channel. These programs were largely simulcast via San Francisco independent station KTSF-TV.

In July 1998, KNSO entered into a local marketing agreement (LMA) with Pappas Telecasting Companies, then-owner of Fox affiliate KMPH-TV (channel 26); Pappas then signed an affiliation agreement to make KNSO the market's WB affiliate, taking the affiliation from Clovis-based KGMC (channel 43). On January 1, 2001, KNSO swapped affiliations with KFRE-TV (channel 59), becoming a Telemundo affiliate; shortly beforehand, Pappas entered into an LMA with KFRE, resulting in the WB affiliation being relocated to KFRE. The station became a Telemundo owned-and-operated station, when the network's then-new parent company NBC bought the station in May 2003.

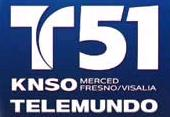
KNSO logo when NBC operated the station, used until 2009

In March 2004, KNSO vacated its McKinley Road studios and moved to a new facility in North Fresno at 30 River Park Place. The station also implemented an advanced operational environment, making KNSO one of the most advanced television stations in the country. This experimental operating system allowed for a "limited intervention" master control center, which involves a highly automated system of operation. The station automation systems are almost completely self-reliant and provide for little to no assistance by the station personnel in running the on-air switching, monitoring and logging. This system uses the Florical Airboss, centralized sales and traffic systems, and various Grass Valley Group broadcast systems, including the Profile XP and Concerto. This experimental operation system has proved successful, and has now been implemented in other station operation control centers.

ZGS Communications took over the operations of KNSO (as well as San Antonio sister station KVDA) on May 1, 2009, although NBC retained the licenses to both stations. Serestar Communications assumed the operations of the station on May 1, 2014, under a joint sales and time brokerage agreement that was to run through December 31, 2020, NBCUniversal retained the KNSO license.

On December 6, 2018, it was announced that NBCUniversal would terminate its local marketing agreement with Serestar in early 2019, making KNSO a full Telemundo O&O for the first time since 2009. This was in conjunction with NBCUniversal's purchase of Serestar-owned Telemundo affiliates KTMW and KULX-CD in Salt Lake City and KCSO-LD in Sacramento. The transaction was completed and the LMA terminated on March 5, 2019.

On February 27, 2020, Cocola agreed to transfer the license assets of KGMC to NBCUniversal's Telemundo Station Group in exchange for acquiring the KNSO license. The sale was completed on September 1. Upon completion of the transfer in which the callsigns were also swapped, KGMC now operates on VHF channel 11, while KNSO operates on UHF channel 27.

== Technical information ==
=== Subchannels ===
The station's signal is multiplexed:

Subchannels of KGMC
Subchannel	Res.	Short name	Programming
43.1	720p	Estrella	Estrella TV
43.5	480i	TOONS	MeTV Toons (4:3)
43.6	480i	Me-TV	MeTV
43.8	480i	Cozi	Cozi TV
43.9	480i	Laff	WEST
43.10	480i	StartTV	Start TV

On July 3, 2024, KGMC began providing transmission capacity for the main channel of KVPT, Fresno's PBS station, after the transmitter facility was destroyed by a wildfire the week before.

=== Analog-to-digital conversion ===
KGMC (as KNSO) ended regular programming on its analog signal, over UHF channel 51, on June 12, 2009, the official date on which full-power television stations in the United States transitioned from analog to digital broadcasts under federal mandate. The station moved its digital signal from its pre-transition VHF channel 5 to channel 11, using virtual channel 51.

As part of the SAFER Act, the station kept its analog signal on the air until June 26 to inform viewers of the digital television transition through a loop of public service announcements from the National Association of Broadcasters.
