= KAIL =

Television station in Fresno, California

- Fresno, California; United States
- Channels: Digital: 7 (VHF); Virtual: 7

Programming
- Affiliations: 7.1: TCT; for others, see § Subchannels

Ownership
- Owner: Total Christian Television; (Radiant Life Ministries, Inc.)

History
- First air date: December 18, 1961
- Former channel number: Analog: 53 (UHF, 1961–2009)
- Former affiliations: Independent (1961–1995); UPN (1995–2006); MyNetworkTV (2006–2020)

Technical information
- Licensing authority: FCC
- Facility ID: 67494
- ERP: 48.8 kW
- HAAT: 560 m (1,837 ft)
- Transmitter coordinates: 37°4′19.9″N 119°25′54.7″W

Links
- Public license information: Public file; LMS
- Website: www.tct.tv

KAIL (channel 7) is a religious television station in Fresno, California, United States, owned by Total Christian Television (TCT). The station's studios are located on North 11th Street in northern Fresno, and its transmitter is located in Meadow Lakes in rural northeastern Fresno County.

== History ==
=== Background ===
The UHF channel 53 allocation in the Fresno market was originally licensed to KBID-TV, which operated for a few months in 1954. The station was owned by veteran broadcaster John Poole, the original owner of KBIC-TV in Los Angeles. KBID ceased operations when the station was unable to acquire a network affiliation. At the time, CBS was the only U.S. broadcast network that did not have an affiliate in Fresno. The network would eventually affiliate with KFRE-TV (channel 12, now ABC owned-and-operated station KFSN-TV on channel 30) when that station signed on in May 1956.

=== Early years ===
The station first signed on the air on December 18, 1961, originally broadcasting on UHF channel 53; it was the first independent station to sign on in the Fresno market, beating eventual competitor KICU-TV (channel 43, channel allocation now occupied by KGMC) to the air by five days. The station holds the record for the longest continuous usage of the same call letters in the Fresno market (though the station was off the air from spring of 1973 to the fall of 1976), having used the KAIL callsign since its sign-on; it has held the record since 2000, when KJEO-TV (channel 47, which signed on under those call letters in September 1953) changed its calls to KGPE (several other stations have had the same call letters since their original licensing, but signed on after KAIL made its debut), and is the only Fresno station that is independently owned.

In its early years, KAIL produced a sizable amount of its own programming; among them included the children's program Leebo the Clown. During the 1960s, KAIL ran a mix of religious and public affairs programs, a few older syndicated programs, some cartoons, classic movies, some sports events, and Spanish programming during prime time hours. The station originally broadcast for about eight hours a day.

The station got some competition in 1971, when KMPH-TV signed on from Visalia. Soon after sign on, due in part to its wealthier ownership (the Pappas family), KMPH passed KAIL as the strongest independent in the Central Valley. In 1972, a full-time commercial Spanish-language station, KFTV (channel 21) signed on, taking the Spanish programming airing on KAIL. At that point, for many reasons, KAIL began to have financial problems and as a result was still broadcasting in black and white. On April 17, 1973, KAIL went dark with plans to eventually sign back on after upgrades. They resumed broadcasting on a testing basis in September 1976 and resumed regular programming on October 7, 1976. It was on the air about six to eight hours a day running mostly religious programs such as The 700 Club and TBN's Praise the Lord, among others. The station also ran some children's programs and public affairs programming. As time went on, a few low budget drama shows, movies, and first run barter syndicated shows would be added. Cartoons began to move onto the schedule by 1983. The station was on the air about 20 hours a day by 1985, but continued to lean toward carrying barter syndicated programs, especially after KMPH beat it out for the rights to stronger programming. Still, their lineup became gradually stronger as the 80s progressed and KAIL finally became a major player. The station's ratings continued to be rather modest throughout the 1980s.

=== Since 1995 ===
On January 16, 1995, KAIL became a charter affiliate of the United Paramount Network (UPN); the station maintained a schedule resembling an independent during its first three years with the network as UPN would not carry a week's worth of programming until 1999 (even at that point, the network had no weekend prime time programming). During the 1990s, KAIL added stronger programs to its schedule, including recent off-network sitcoms, talk, reality and court shows. The station began gradually phasing out cartoons from its schedule around 2000 and dropped them from the weekday lineup altogether in August 2003, when UPN discontinued its children's program block, Disney's One Too.

On February 22, 2006, News Corporation announced the launch of a new "sixth" network called MyNetworkTV, which would be operated by Fox Television Stations and its syndication division Twentieth Television. MyNetworkTV was created to compete against another upstart network that would launch at the same time that September, The CW (an amalgamated network that originally consisted primarily of UPN and The WB's higher-rated programs) as well as to give UPN and WB stations that were not mentioned as becoming CW affiliates another option besides converting to independent stations. KFRE-TV (channel 59, no relation to what is now KFSN-TV) took the CW affiliation; KAIL, meanwhile, signed an affiliation agreement to become MyNetworkTV's Fresno affiliate. The station became a charter affiliate of the network when it launched on September 5, 2006.

In 2008, the station acquired the broadcast rights to Fresno State Bulldogs collegiate sporting events, assuming the rights from CW affiliate KFRE-TV.

KAIL-TV shut down its analog signal, over UHF channel 53, on June 12, 2009, the official date on which full-power television stations in the United States transitioned from analog to digital broadcasts under federal mandate. The station's digital signal broadcasts on its pre-transition VHF channel 7.

On April 1, 2008, KAIL began carrying the classic television service, the Retro Television Network, on digital subchannel 7.2. The subchannel eventually assumed local broadcast rights to San Francisco Giants Major League Baseball games, which moved to the station from KFRE-TV. On January 14, 2013, KAIL ended its run as an affiliate of RTV, switching its 7.2 subchannel over to the similarly styled Cozi TV. In 2017, Light TV launched on 7.2, with Cozi moving to a newly created 7.4 subchannel.

In February 2010, KAIL became the first television station in the Fresno market to begin offering Mobile DTV broadcasts, simulcasting the station's main channel and digital subchannel 7.2.

On April 15, 2014, KAIL's longtime owners Trans-America Broadcasting changed its name to Tel-America North Corporation, as part of a restructuring of the company's operations, which coincided with the sale of its sole radio outlet KTYM in Los Angeles to El Sembrador Ministries; as a result, KAIL until then was Tel-America's sole media property. On April 6, 2015, Tel-America agreed to sell KAIL to Aperio Communications for $3 million.

=== Sale to TCT ===
On August 7, 2020, Aperio Communications announced that it would sell KAIL to Marion, Illinois–based Total Christian Television for an undisclosed price. The sale would exclude sales and programming contracts as well as the MyNetworkTV affiliation. The sale was completed on September 30. On September 28, 2020, KAIL became a TCT owned-and-operated station, running only Christian programming from the TCT satellite channel, making it the second religious station in the Fresno area (alongside KNXT, however, that station was shut down a few months before the sale). The KAIL intellectual unit and MyNetworkTV affiliation moved to KMSG-LD.

== Newscasts ==
On July 31, 2006, NBC affiliate KSEE (channel 24) began producing a half-hour primetime newscast that air Monday through Fridays at 10 p.m. through a news share agreement; the program was discontinued on September 11, 2009, having been canceled due to low ratings.

The station would not air local news programming again until January 7, 2013, when ABC owned-and-operated station KFSN-TV began to produce another weeknight-only 10 p.m. newscast for KAIL. Titled ABC 30 Action News Live at 10:00, the program competed with the longer established in-house 10 p.m. newscast on Fox affiliate KMPH-TV (channel 26), which comparatively runs for one hour and airs seven nights a week. With the news share agreement with KAIL, KFSN became the fourth ABC-owned station to produce a newscast for an unrelated station in the same market (WTVD in Raleigh, North Carolina, and WPVI-TV in Philadelphia produce 10 p.m. newscasts for CW affiliate WLFL and MyNetworkTV affiliate WPHL-TV in their respective markets, while KGO-TV in San Francisco produces a 9 p.m. newscast for independent station KOFY-TV; they were later joined by KABC-TV in Los Angeles, which produced newscasts at 7 and 7:30 p.m. for independent station KDOC-TV). KFSN ended the 10 p.m. newscast in July 2014. In September 2018, KFSN resumed producing a newscast for KAIL; this time airing weeknights for 60 minutes at 8 p.m.

== Subchannels ==
The station's signal is multiplexed:

Subchannels of KAIL
Subchannel	Res.	Short name	Programming
7.1	1080i	KAIL HD	TCT
7.2	480i	SBN	SonLife
7.3	480i	Heroes	Heroes & Icons
7.4	480i	BizTV	Biz TV
7.5	480i	GDT	Infomercials
7.6	480i	GodTV	[Blank]
7.7	480i	ONTV4U	OnTV4U
7.8	480i	Positiv	Positiv
7.9	480i	ShopLC	Shop LC
7.10	480i	SumTV	Religious "SUMTV"
7.11	480i	SumTVLT	Spanish Religious "SUMTV Latino"

Simulcast of subchannels of another station
