= KCFT =

KCFT may refer to:

- KCFT-CD, a low-power television station (channel 35) licensed to serve Anchorage, Alaska, United States
- KCFT-TV (California), a former television station (channel 42) licensed to serve Concord, California, United States
- Greenlee County Airport (ICAO code KCFT)
