= KMSG-LD =

Television station in Fresno, California

- Fresno, California; United States
- Channels: Digital: 29 (UHF); Virtual: 39

Programming
- Affiliations: 39.1: LATV; for others, see § Subchannels

Ownership
- Owner: Cocola Broadcasting Companies, LLC
- Sister stations: KGMC

History
- Founded: September 6, 1995
- First air date: September 29, 1999
- Former call signs: K09XA (1999); K55IM (1999–2001); KMSG-LP (2001–2012)
- Former channel numbers: Analog: 55 (UHF, 1999–2006), 39 (UHF, 2006–2012); Digital: 39 (UHF, 2012–2019); Virtual: 43 (2019–2020), 53 (2020–2025)
- Former affiliations: Shop at Home (1999–2008); Azteca América (2008–2020, primary; 2020–2022, 43.2); MyNetworkTV (2020–2025)

Technical information
- Licensing authority: FCC
- Facility ID: 65762
- Class: LD
- ERP: 15 kW
- HAAT: 622.9 m (2,044 ft)
- Transmitter coordinates: 36°44′45.2″N 119°17′2.4″W

Links
- Public license information: LMS

KMSG-LD (channel 39) is a low-power television station in Fresno, California, United States, affiliated with LATV. It is owned by Cocola Broadcasting alongside Merced-licensed Estrella TV affiliate KGMC (channel 43) and seven other low-power stations. KMSG-LD's transmitter is located on Bear Mountain, near Meadow Lakes, California.

== History ==
KVVG-LD started out as KVVG-LP, an affiliate of Almavision for the Visalia area in early 2005. Formerly on channel 31, it later moved to channel 54. KVVG-LP changed to Tvida Vision in mid-2005. As of 2011, the station converted to a digital signal, as KVVG-LD.

The KVVG calls were originally used on a DuMont affiliate on channel 27 in Tulare in the 1950s. The KMSG calls were originally used on what is now CW affiliate KFRE-TV (channel 59) from its sign-on from 1985 to 2001.

Until mid-2006, KMSG's programming was also seen on KPMC-LP (channel 42, now KZKC-LD) in Bakersfield, which was sold to McGraw-Hill, becoming a standalone Azteca América affiliate and later a translator of ABC affiliate KERO-TV (channel 23).

On September 28, 2020, MyNetworkTV programming moved to KMSG, after the network's previous affiliate, KAIL (channel 7), switched to TCT.

On December 31, 2022, Azteca América ceased operations.

== Newscasts ==
When KMSG took on the MyNetworkTV affiliation, the station aired an edition of Action News at 8 p.m. weeknights produced by ABC O&O KFSN-TV, which previously aired on KAIL. The newscast was canceled in December 2021 and the station aired NewsNet for three months following. In April 2022, MyTV53 News @ 8 debuted with anchor and news director Austin Reed. This was the first attempt for the station to produce its own newscast; however by early 2024, the newscast ended.

== Technical information ==
=== Subchannels ===
The station's signal is multiplexed:

Subchannels of KMSG-LD
Subchannel	Res.	Short name	Programming
39.1	480i	LATV	LATV
39.3	480i	CBN	CBN News
39.4	480i	OAN	One America Plus
39.5	480i	NOWNEWS	[Blank]

=== Former rebroadcasters ===
- KFAZ-CA 8 Visalia
- KMCF-LP 35 Visalia
- KBID-LP 31 Fresno
