= KFVD =

KFVD may refer to:

- KFVD-LD, a low-power television station (channel 15) licensed to serve Porterville, California, United States; see List of television stations in California
- KTNQ, a radio station (1020 AM) licensed to serve Los Angeles, California, which held the call sign KFVD from 1925 to 1955
