= Kent Ninomiya =

American journalist (born 1966)

- Born: 1966 (age 59–60); San Francisco, California, U.S.
- Education: University City High School; University of California, Berkeley (B.A.); St. Mary's University School of Law (J.D.)
- Occupation: Television journalist
- Website: www.kentninomiya.com

Kent Ninomiya is the first male Asian American broadcast journalist to be a primary news anchor of a television station in the United States. The Asian American Journalist Association, often referred to as the AAJA, notes that there are numerous Asian American women on the air at American television news stations but very few Asian American men. This disparity is even more pronounced with television news anchors. Kent Ninomiya was the first Asian American man to be a main anchor.

== Main Anchor ==
Kent Ninomiya became the primary news anchor for KSTP-TV in Minneapolis-St Paul in 2003. His co-anchor, Harris Faulkner, is African American and female. The all minority main anchor team working in a television market with very few minority viewers was heralded by journalism organizations across the country. Ninomiya was also primary news anchor and managing editor at WICD in Champaign in 2006 and 2007.

== Other Anchoring ==
Ninomiya first became a full-time news anchor in 1999 when he was named the weekday 5am - 7am morning news anchor for KGO-TV, the ABC owned and operated television station in San Francisco. At KGO his co-anchors included Beth Spicuza, Carolyn Johnson and Elizabeth Bermudez. From 2001 through 2003 Ninomiya anchored the weekend evening news at KCOP in Los Angeles. He worked with several prominent co-anchors there including Gina Silva, Jennifer Gould, Maria Quiban and Lauren Sánchez. During Ninomiya's time at KCOP, the news operation was merged with KTTV, the Fox station in Los Angeles, as part of a duopoly. Ninomiya appeared on the air for both Los Angeles television stations.

== Reporter/Anchor ==
Prior to working in Los Angeles, Ninomiya was a reporter and fill in anchor. From 1993 to 1998 he worked for WLS-TV, the ABC owned and operated television station in Chicago. From 1991 to 1993 he worked at KGTV the ABC television station in San Diego. From 1990 to 1991 he worked for KFSN the ABC owned and operated television station in Fresno. In 1990 he worked for KJEO (now KGPE) the CBS television station in Fresno.

== Early Anchoring ==
Ninomiya first appeared on the air as a television news anchor in 1989 when he was the weekday morning news anchor for KIEM, the NBC television station in Eureka, California. He also reported for that station.

== Early career ==
Ninomiya's first appearance on television was in early 1989 at WGGB, the ABC television station in Springfield, Massachusetts, where he was an assignment editor and reporter. Prior to that, he worked behind the scenes at the Washington, D.C., bureau of CNN in 1988, KGO-TV in San Francisco in 1988, and KTVU in Oakland in 1987.

== Education ==
Kent Ninomiya graduated magna cum laude from St. Mary's University School of Law with a Juris Doctor. He has a bachelor's degree in social sciences from the University of California at Berkeley and was a fellow of Journalism Ethics at the Poynter Institute.

== Current ==
Kent Ninomiya is a lawyer at Ninomiya Law, PLLC specializing in mass media and social media law.
