= Kopi Sotiropulos =

Greek-born American character actor (born 1948)

- Born: Prokopios Sotiropolus; September 12, 1948 (age 77); Peloponnese, Greece
- Occupations: Actor, voice artist, television personality, TV weatherman and meteorologist
- Years active: 1970–present

Kopi Sotiropulos (born Prokopios Sotiropoulos; Greek: Προκόπιος Σωτηρόπουλος; September 12, 1948) is a Greek-born American character actor. He is a Fresno area television news personality and longtime weatherman who served as the weekly evening news weatherperson for KMPH-TV (then based in Visalia, California). He reports the weather and co-anchors, along with Kim Stephens, the station's Great Day weekday morning talk/news program.

== Life and career ==
A graduate of Fresno High School, Sotiropulos attended Fresno City College before transferring to San Francisco State University during his sophomore year, where he earned his degree in broadcasting. His first job in television was as a commercial copywriter for KMPH-TV in October 1971.

In 1977, Sotiropulos and his wife Elaine relocated to Hollywood, California. Sotiropulos, who decided to try acting, appeared in numerous guest roles in such TV series as the CBS-TV series The Incredible Hulk, Three's Company, The New Mike Hammer, Perfect Strangers, Highway To Heaven, Soap, General Hospital, Days of Our Lives, The Hardy Boys, and Knight Rider. He also had small parts in films, including Private Benjamin (1980), The Postman Always Rings Twice (1981), and as a barkeep in Beverly Hills Cop II. Sotiropulos returned to TV news at KMPH-TV in 1987, and by 1992 was the station's weekly evening news weatherperson. Kopi is now the co-host and weatherperson of the KMPH-TV "Great Day" morning news show.
