= KRIV (TV) =

Television station in Houston

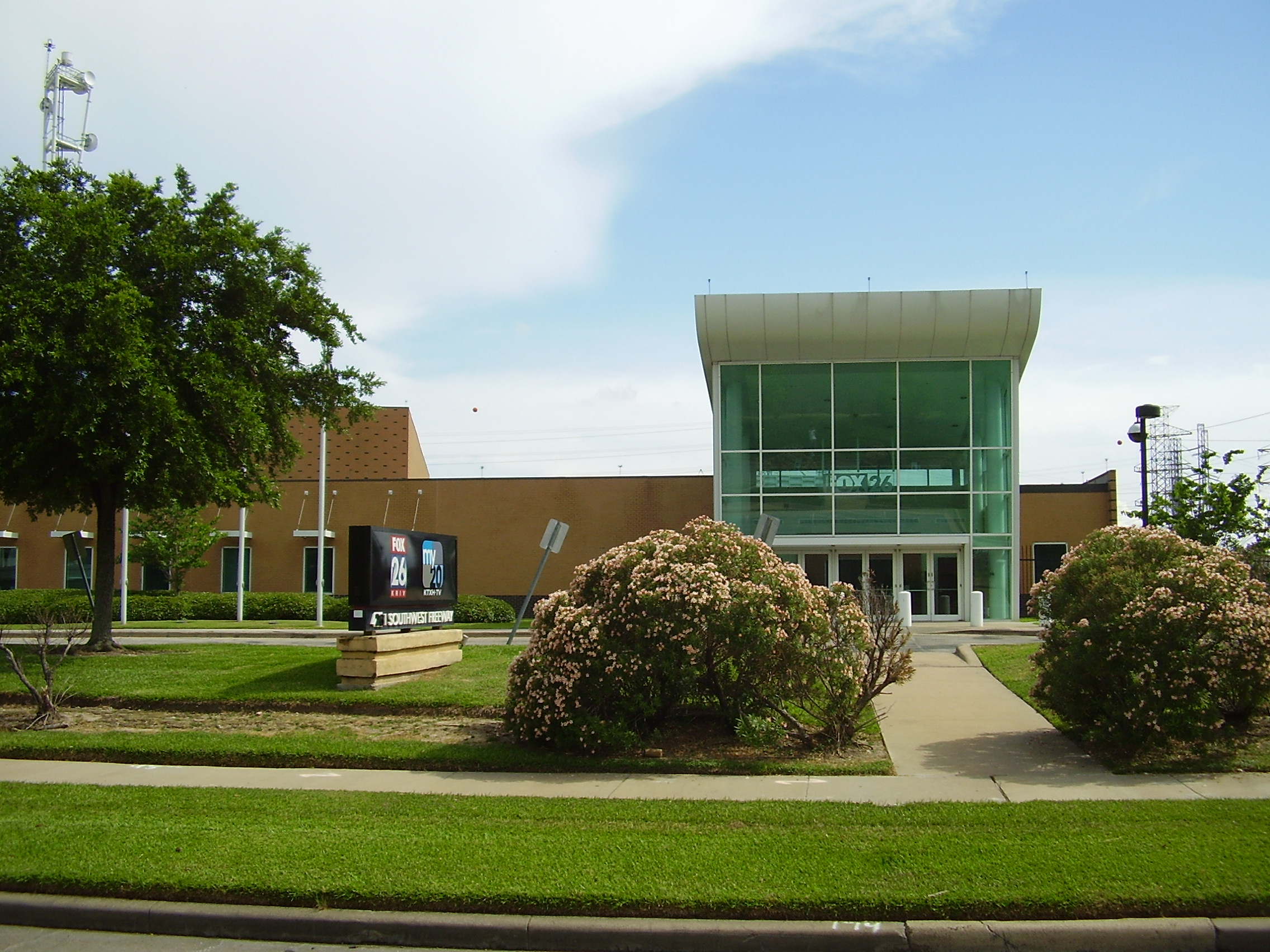
- Studios for KRIV and KTXH on Southwest Freeway in Houston
- Houston, Texas; United States
- Channels: Digital: 26 (UHF); Virtual: 26
- Branding: Fox 26 Houston; Fox 26 News

Programming
- Affiliations: 26.1: Fox; for others, see § Subchannels

Ownership
- Owner: Fox Television Stations, LLC
- Sister stations: KTXH

History
- First air date: August 15, 1971
- Former call signs: KVRL (1971–1975); KDOG-TV (1975–1978); KRIV-TV (1978–1986)
- Former channel numbers: Analog: 26 (UHF, 1971–2009); Digital: 27 (UHF, 2001–2009)
- Former affiliations: Independent (1971–1986)
- Call sign meaning: Albert Krivin, senior vice president of former owner Metromedia

Technical information
- Licensing authority: FCC
- Facility ID: 22204
- ERP: 1,000 kW
- HAAT: 598 m (1,962 ft)
- Transmitter coordinates: 29°34′28″N 95°29′37″W

Links
- Public license information: Public file; LMS
- Website: www.fox26houston.com

KRIV (channel 26) is a television station in Houston, Texas, United States. It is owned and operated by the Fox network through its Fox Television Stations division alongside KTXH (channel 20), an independent station with MyNetworkTV. The two stations share studios on Southwest Freeway (I-69/US 59) in Houston; KRIV's transmitter is located near Missouri City, Texas.

Established in 1971 as an independent station under the KVRL call sign and later as KDOG-TV, channel 26 hit its stride after being sold to Metromedia in 1978; it was then renamed in honor of the Metromedia executive who had encouraged the company to purchase it. Metromedia started the station's news department before being sold and becoming the nucleus of the Fox network in 1986. KRIV's local news programming has since steadily expanded to cover hours of morning, evening, and late news.

== History ==
=== Early years ===
On February 17, 1964, the Crest Broadcasting Company—headed by Leroy J. Gloger, a former owner of country music radio station KIKK (650 AM)—filed an application to build a new TV station on channel 29 in Houston. Crest proposed a station focusing on minority and specialist programming, with shows in Spanish and for Black viewers as well as a 9 p.m. local newscast. The Federal Communications Commission (FCC)'s UHF allotment overhaul of 1965 substituted channel 26 for 29. Crest was selected over a competing application from radio station KXYZ, as it got the nod on diversification grounds and superior financial qualifications. One of the matters at hand was the participation of Houston mayor Louie Welch in KXYZ-TV Inc. KXYZ appealed and asked to submit a revised financial statement, also claiming that Crest had made a misrepresentation as to one of its officers, Bernard Calkins. At the hearing, it was revealed that, after meeting with Welch in his office, the officers of Houston's Medical Center National Bank canceled a $250,000 loan to Calkins. FCC hearing examiner Chester F. Naumowicz denied the request and upheld the Crest grant, finding that Calkins was not aware of the bank officers' change of heart.

Construction got underway for KVRL in late 1970, with a mast being erected atop One Shell Plaza in downtown Houston and studios being built in the Schindler Center development at 3935 Westheimer Road in the Highland Village section. The station began broadcasting on August 15, 1971. Programming mostly consisted of syndicated reruns, Texas Rangers baseball, and an affiliation with the Christian Broadcasting Network. Local output included a version of Bozo's Big Top, a nightly sports show called Sports Cavalcade, a country music show, and the talk show Houston After Dark.

In 1975, Gloger, who had also taken over general manager duties, was having a conversation when someone remarked that channel 26 was an underdog. For Gloger, who had a penchant for memorable station brands (such as the moniker and call sign for KIKK), it was the spark of an idea. He checked with the FCC, found that the call letters KDOG were available, and then changed channel 26 to KDOG-TV on September 1. A series of program changes accompanied the new moniker; the station added 90 minutes a night of Spanish-language programming in prime time.

=== Acquisition by Metromedia ===
Six years after going on the air, Crest Broadcasting announced the sale of KDOG-TV to Metromedia for $11 million, including $6 million for the station itself and another $5 million in liabilities. The acquisition closed in April, and on April 17, 1978, the call letters were changed to the current KRIV, in honor of then-Metromedia executive Albert Krivin, who had convinced John Kluge to take a chance on the Houston station. Jerry Marcus—general sales manager of Metromedia's Washington, D.C., station WTTG—was hired to manage channel 26's operations, remaining there until his retirement in December 1999.

Metromedia, among the top operators of independent stations, turned a station that was regarded as a "mangy mutt" and had turned a slight profit in just its last two years into a top-rated outlet that experienced a 400-percent increase in ratings between 1978 and 1980 and challenged the network affiliates in the early evening access hours. An additional investment in new programming was immediately apparent; in 1979, channel 26 became the new TV home of the Houston Astros, and the cost of syndicated programming doubled or tripled as Metromedia spent what one broadcaster estimated was $10 million on programming in its first six months of owning KRIV. The Spanish-language entertainment programming, from the Spanish International Network (now known as Univision), was moved out of prime time and reduced to make way for nightly movies and The Merv Griffin Show; the studios were expanded, and a new transmitter facility was constructed in 1982. Local programming was also expanded, with several new public affairs programs. A local newscast at 7 p.m. was added in 1983.

=== As a Fox owned-and-operated station ===
On May 6, 1985, Metromedia agreed to sell KRIV and the other five television stations in the Metromedia group to Australian newspaper tycoon Rupert Murdoch, all of which became the founding owned-and-operated stations of his new television network, the Fox Broadcasting Company. Despite being a member of the new network, KRIV's schedule did not change very much, as at that time, Fox only aired a late-night talk show upon the network's launch; even when prime time programming followed in 1987, the network initially aired the lineup on Saturdays and Sundays. The primary changes were in local programming—where the new owners cut channel 26's existing local public affairs show, Houston Live, and a local children's program—and the move of KRIV's news to 9 p.m. to accommodate more Fox prime time programming. Ratings steadily increased, with total-day ratings tying NBC affiliate KPRC-TV by 1993.

After having operated from the same quarters on Westheimer since its establishment, KRIV acquired a tract of land near the Southwest Freeway to build a new, 78,000-square-foot (7,200 m^{2}) facility that would provide sufficient space and parking for the expanding station. The $40 million facility went into full-time use at the end of 1997 and included new, digital equipment. This facility began housing KTXH in 2001 when Fox acquired the station in a trade with Viacom after CBS acquired UPN. The studios were also used for production of syndicated programming from 20th Television, including the court shows Texas Justice, Cristina's Court, and Judge Alex. It also featured a landing pad for the station's news helicopter; a helicopter leased to KRIV crashed in November 2000, killing the pilot.

== Programming ==
=== News operation ===
By 1982, with Metromedia owning major news-producing independent stations and planning a national news program (for which it attempted to poach Charles Kuralt and John Hart), KRIV was considering starting a news department of its own. This led to the August 1983 launch of KRIV's 7 p.m. newscast, the first prime time newscast in the Houston market. The newscast was originally intended to be a television equivalent to All Things Considered, more sophisticated than its competition. By 1986, it was attracting an audience that at times equaled the third-place 6 p.m. broadcast from KHOU, and a 12:30 p.m. newscast was added. When Fox began providing network programming in prime time, the newscast relocated to its present 9 p.m. position, which brought better ratings and a more loyal news audience.

In 1989, the station began airing Sunday night news specials under the banner City Under Siege, focusing on drug-related issues in Houston. The program regularly featured drug busts, and what some viewers called an overemphasis on Black people being arrested led to rules being set by the Houston Police Department. The program later evolved into a general crime program and outlived several others using the same format at other stations.

Since the 1990s, the station has conducted several major news expansions. In 1993, it started a morning newscast, initially at 7 a.m., as well as a Sunday night newscast. The morning newscast first expanded to three hours, then to four in 2003. On August 18, 2008, KRIV debuted an hour-long weeknight 5 p.m. newscast.

On July 7, 2012, KRIV significantly expanded its news offerings on weekends beyond its one prime time hour, debuting a three-hour weekend morning newscast from 5 a.m. to 8 a.m. and expanding its hour-long 5 p.m. newscast to weekends for a total of eight additional hours of news on the weekends. Prior to the launch of the new newscasts, KRIV was one of only two Fox-owned stations – alongside Chicago sister station WFLD – that did not have an early evening newscast seven nights each week. On August 21, 2017, KRIV launched a 10 p.m. weeknight newscast titled The NewsEdge at 10, which emphasizes a recap format. The NewsEdge brand was expanded in 2020 to a 6 p.m. newscast, anchored by Kaitlin Monte.

On September 24, 2018, KRIV rebranded the first three hours of its weekday morning newscast from 4 to 7 a.m. as Wake Up! with SallyMac & Lina, with longtime KRIV reporter/anchor Sally MacDonald and new hire Lina De Florias (who would join the station from KTVK/KPHO-TV in Phoenix) serving as the namesake anchors, featuring a format similar to that of its 10 p.m. newscast; the remainder of the newscast was then rebranded months later as "Houston's Morning Show".

=== Non-news programming ===
In addition to local news, KRIV produces other news and public affairs programs. The Isiah Factor: Uncensored, a nightly program hosted by Isiah Carey, features interviews with newsmakers; What's Your Point? is a political program hosted by Greg Groogan.

==== Notable current on-air news staff ====
- Isiah Carey – general assignment reporter, Isiah Factor host
- Caroline Collins – anchor

==== Notable former on-air staff ====
- Anna Davlantes – anchor
- Jan Jeffcoat – anchor (2004–2007)
- Kaitlin Monte – anchor (2016–2022)
- Stephen Morgan – meteorologist (2017–2021)
- Chau Nguyen – reporter (1998–2000)
- Hank Plante – reporter/anchor

== Technical information ==
=== Subchannels ===
KRIV's transmitter is located near Missouri City, Texas. The station's signal is multiplexed, including the main subchannel of sister station KTXH, which in turn broadcasts KRIV as one of Houston's ATSC 3.0 (Next Gen TV) stations.

Subchannels of KRIV
Subchannel	Res.	Short name	Programming
26.1	720p	KRIV DT	Fox
26.2	480i	Catchy	Catchy Comedy
26.3	480i	FOX WX	Fox Weather
20.1	720p	KTXH-DT	MyNetworkTV (KTXH)

Broadcast on behalf of another station

=== Analog-to-digital conversion ===
KRIV ended regular programming on its analog signal, over UHF channel 26, on June 12, 2009, as part of the federally mandated transition from analog to digital television. The station's digital signal relocated from its pre-transition UHF channel 27 to channel 26 for post-transition operations.
