= Vic Jacobs =

American sportscaster

- Born: Victor Jacobs; December 12, 1952 (age 73)
- Other names: Vic "The Brick" Jacobs

Victor Jacobs (born December 12, 1952), also known as Vic "The Brick" Jacobs, is an American radio and television sportscaster. He is best known as a former co-host of The Loose Cannons, a sports radio talk airing nationally on Fox Sports Radio. He is known for eccentric behavior, like wearing fur caps and robes, and writing Lakers haiku poems to read on-air.

== Early years ==
Jacobs grew up in Queens, New York. He is a graduate of Cornell University, and got his start in broadcasting in Guam, back in 1979. Jacobs also had other sports broadcasting stints, working at KTVV (now KXAN-TV), in Austin, Texas, KMPH-TV in Fresno, California, and radio and television outlets in Phoenix, Arizona. Jacobs began his broadcasting career at Western Albemarle High School in Crozet, Virginia. He announced games for the Warriors. In 1988, Jacobs arrived in Los Angeles and at KCOP-TV, where he was the station's sports Anchor. It was starting there that Jacobs' eccentric personality came to light, and was most remembered for throwing a foam brick at the camera, for anything that he disagreed with. However, the "Brick" was used on his Austin, Texas sportscasts as far back as the mid-1980s.

The stint at KIIS led Jacobs to help launch the new sports-talk format at KIIS's AM sister station, the newly renamed KXTA (1150 AM, now KEIB). The new station was based on the popular XTRA Sports 690 in San Diego, a sister station then-owned by Jacor Communications (now part of Clear Channel Communications). On March 10, 1997, Jacobs was first voice heard on the new XTRA Sports 1150, as a solo host of a midday program. Later on, he was teamed with NBA superstar and future Hall of Famer Karl Malone and NFL Hall of Famer Terry Bradshaw in hosting duties.

In 2011 he was inducted into the Southern California Jewish Sports Hall of Fame.
