= Susie Frankeberger =

American journalist

Susie Frankeberger is a former television news journalist who worked as an anchor for CBS affiliate KGPE, Channel 47, in Fresno, California, from 1998 to 2008.

Frankeberger was born in Bakersfield and raised in Dos Palos, California, graduating from Dos Palos High School. She attended California State University, Fresno and was named the Outstanding Journalism Graduate.

A multi-award winner, Frankeberger captured several prestigious honors including: An Emmy for a 60-minute news cast at KGET in Bakersfield; an AFTRA award for Best One hour Special; Kern Press Club Awards; Best live shot, hard news, editing, feature.

Frankeberger was KGPE's "Health and Family Safety" reporter, and worked with the local chapter of the American Heart Association on the "Jump for Heart" program in local schools.
