= Anna Davlantes =

American journalist and television news presenter

Anna Davlantes is an American journalist and television news presenter. She is the current afternoon drive host from 1p-4p Monday-Friday on WGN Radio in Chicago. Prior to working at WGN Radio, she co-hosted Good Day Chicago on Fox 32 Chicago and has worked for PBS station WTTW, NBC affiliate WMAQ-TV in Chicago, ABC affiliate WPTA in Fort Wayne, Indiana, and KRIV in Houston.

Davlantes is a multiple Regional Emmy Award winner, including an Emmy for "Get Into The Shark Tank!", an underwater documentary that involved swimming with sharks.

== Biography ==
Davlantes was raised in Rogers Park, Chicago, and attended Lane Tech High School. She studied at the University of Oxford and graduated from the University of Notre Dame in South Bend, Indiana.

=== Career ===
In 2002, Davlantes presented NBC 5 Chicago's breaking news coverage of a fatal scaffolding collapse at the John Hancock Center, winning a Regional Emmy Award.

In May 2003, Davlantes broke a story that gained national media attention by being the first to acquire a video showing seniors hazing juniors at a powderpuff game in Northbrook, Illinois. The exposure of the hazing incident at Glenbrook North High School led to national hazing reform. Davlantes appeared on The Oprah Winfrey Show to discuss hazing among youth.

In 2005, Davlantes aired a series of reports exposing mob intimidation in Bridgeview, Illinois. She received several threats while investigating the piece. The Chicago Headline Club recognized her work by awarding her the Ethics Award in Journalism.

Davlantes' experience as a diver allowed her to host the documentary "Get Into the Shark Tank!", which aired on NBC 5 Chicago and won Davlantes another Regional Emmy Award. The documentary is filmed almost entirely underwater in the shark tank at the Shedd Aquarium, and Davlantes is credited with the first underwater live shot on a local newscast.

She also fills in as a co-host on WLS-AM radio with Roe Conn and Richard Roeper. As of March 6, 2014, Davlantes is a radio host for WGN Radio and an anchor for WGN-TV, in addition she is part of the investigation unit.

=== Personal life ===
Davlantes married David R. Gamperl, a businessman; the couple had a daughter, Gabriella Britton Davlantes Gamperl, in 2011.

== Awards ==
- Ethics Award in Journalism from The Chicago Headline Club
- Herman Kogan Award from The American Bar Association
- Emmy Award for "Get Into the Shark Tank!"
