= KMPH-TV =

Television station in Visalia, California

- Visalia–Fresno, California; United States
- City: Visalia, California
- Channels: Digital: 28 (UHF); Virtual: 26
- Branding: Fox 26

Programming
- Affiliations: 26.1: Fox; for others, see § KMPH-TV subchannels

Ownership
- Owner: Sinclair Broadcast Group; (KMPH Licensee, LLC)
- Sister stations: KFRE-TV

History
- First air date: October 11, 1971
- Former call signs: KMPH (1971–2006)
- Former channel number: Analog: 26 (UHF, 1971–2009)
- Former affiliations: Independent (1971–1988); The WB (secondary, 1997–2001)
- Call sign meaning: Mike, Pete, and Harry Pappas (station founders)

Technical information
- Licensing authority: FCC
- Facility ID: 51488
- ERP: 245 kW
- HAAT: 792 m (2,598 ft)
- Transmitter coordinates: 36°40′2″N 118°52′45″W
- Translator(s): KMPH-CD 17.1 Merced–Mariposa; KFRE-TV 59.4 Sanger

Links
- Public license information: Public file; LMS
- Website: kmph.com

KMPH-TV (channel 26) is a television station licensed to Visalia, California, United States, serving the Fresno area as an affiliate of the Fox network. It is owned by Sinclair Broadcast Group alongside Sanger-licensed CW affiliate KFRE-TV (channel 59). The two stations share studios on McKinley Avenue in eastern Fresno; KMPH-TV's transmitter is located on Big Baldy Mountain in northwestern Tulare County.

The station's signal is relayed to the northern part of the market on low-power Class A translator KMPH-CD (originally KMPH-LD from 2007 to 2011), channel 17, licensed to Merced and Mariposa, with transmitter on Mount Bullion. Unlike its parent station, the translator does not broadcast in high definition.

== History ==
=== Early years ===
When the Federal Communications Commission (FCC) first underwent a major overhaul of its Television Table of Assignments on June 4, 1965, it sought to "unsaturate" the table by removing all unused commercial UHF allocations from communities with a population below 25,000 unless there was an immediate need by an applicant for that assignment. Tulare, California, with a population of 13,824 in the 1960 United States census, lost its sole allocation, UHF channel 27, as a result of this plan; the channel had once been used by KVVG, a DuMont affiliate owned by Sheldon Anderson alongside KCOK radio and KAFY-AM-TV in Bakersfield, from 1953 to 1957.

In 1967, Pappas Electronics, owner of radio stations KGEN and KBOS in Tulare, petitioned the FCC for the addition of channel 26 at that city; this was granted on July 26, 1967, on the condition that Pappas apply for the channel. The Pappas brothers—Mike, Pete and Harry—received a construction permit for channel 26 on November 6, 1968; KMPH signed on the air on October 11, 1971, as an independent station, broadcasting from studios at Mooney Boulevard in Visalia. While Mike and Pete Pappas originally controlled 45 percent each of the new venture, with Harry owning the other ten percent, other investors were brought on, and by 1973 their combined stake in KMPH was only 30.5 percent.

KMPH carried Operation Prime Time programming at least in 1978. That year, Harry Pappas formed a new company, Pappas Telecasting, to buy full control of the station for $3.1 million. In 1979, KMPH changed its city of license from Tulare to Visalia. That same year, the station began producing tape-delayed broadcasts of Fresno State Bulldogs football. After 1984's NCAA v. Board of Regents of the University of Oklahoma decision brought more freedom for teams to have their games on TV, about a handful of road games began to be telecast live. In 1986, live home games were added to the schedule.

Soon after signing on, KMPH had passed KAIL (then on channel 53, now on channel 7) as the leading independent in the Central Valley. KAIL went dark in 1973 but returned to the air in 1976 as a very low budget operation initially running mostly religion but would gradually build into a major player. Throughout the early to mid-1980s, KMPH was one of the top independent stations in the country. The station could be received up to 100 miles (160 km) from Visalia.

=== Since 1988 ===
Pappas signed an affiliation deal with Fox for KMPH to become an affiliate of the network in 1988; the agreement also covered sister stations WHNS in Greenville, South Carolina, and KPTM in Omaha, Nebraska. At the time, Fresno and Omaha were the only two top-100 markets without a Fox affiliate. KMPH remains a Fox affiliate to this day; both it and NBC affiliate KSEE (channel 24) were the only two stations in Fresno that were unaffected by the 1985 network swap involving ABC and CBS between KFSN-TV (channel 30) and KJEO (channel 47, now KGPE) and the later launches of The CW and MyNetworkTV in September 2006. The station relocated its operations from its original studio in Visalia to its current facility on McKinley Avenue in Fresno in the early 1990s.

=== Ownership change ===
On May 10, 2008, thirteen Pappas stations, including KMPH, filed for Chapter 11 bankruptcy protection. As a result of the bankruptcy, Pappas Telecasting Companies was given until February 15, 2009, to sell these stations to other owners. On January 16, 2009, Pappas announced that most of the stations, including KMPH, would be purchased by New World TV Group (no relation to the similarly named New World Communications, which switched most of its stations to Fox between September 1994 and July 1995), after the sale received United States bankruptcy court approval. On April 2, 2009, Pappas laid off 22 employees involved with the KMPH/KFRE duopoly. New World TV Group formed a new holding company known as the Titan TV Broadcast Group (unrelated to the similarly named smaller-market radio station owner Titan Broadcasting), which completed its purchase of most of the Pappas stations involved in the bankruptcy on October 15, 2009.

Titan announced the sale of KMPH-TV, KFRE-TV and most of the company's other stations to the Sinclair Broadcast Group on June 3, 2013. The FCC approved the sale on September 19, and the sale was officially finalized on October 3, 2013. With the completion of the sale, KMPH was reunited with Bakersfield Fox affiliate, KBFX-CD, which formerly operated as a repeater of KMPH, but was sold by Pappas in 2005 and had been acquired by Sinclair as part of its merger with Fisher Communications earlier in 2013.

== Programming ==
In 2003, KMPH stopped carrying Fox's children's program block 4Kids TV; the block, which normally aired on Saturdays, was moved to sister station KFRE-TV and aired on that station on a tape delay on Sunday mornings (this resulted in KFRE carrying children's blocks from two major networks, as it already carried The WB's Kids' WB block). KMPH was one of the few Fox charter affiliates to have dropped the network's children's programming; beginning in the mid-1990s, Fox gave its affiliates (after several stations that switched to the network between 1994 and 1995 that were owned by New World Communications opted not to carry the lineup) the option to pre-empt Fox Kids programming and arrange for another local station to carry the block, a practice continued until the end of the 4Kids TV's run. KFRE continued to carry 4Kids TV until the block was discontinued by Fox on December 28, 2008, due to a dispute with the block's lessee 4Kids Entertainment; KMPH has also declined to carry Fox's Saturday morning infomercial block Weekend Marketplace, which instead airs on KFRE in 4Kids TV's former Sunday morning timeslot on the station. KMPH began clearing Xploration Station in the mid-2010s, marking the first time since 2003 that the station cleared the entire Fox network schedule.

=== News operation ===
KMPH-TV presently broadcasts 34 1/2 hours of locally produced newscasts each week (with 6 1/2 hours each weekday and one hour each on Saturdays and Sundays); in addition, the station produces the lifestyle program Around the Valley, which airs weekdays at 11 a.m. prior to its midday newscast.

In 1978, KMPH launched its news department and began producing a nightly prime time newscast Monday through Friday; The 10 O'Clock News. Originally the station sourced its national news from the ITN Satellite News Service and API Wire Services to augment its own local news coverage, primarily split between the cities of Visalia and Fresno and the surrounding communities. In late 1979, KMPH launched a short-lived midday newscast, The Midday Edition, which was canceled after nine months. Later, in the early 1980s, the station's newscast was expanded to Saturdays. In early 1982, KMPH, launched a weekly newsmagazine show, The Sunday Edition, which occupied the 10 p.m. timeslot on Sunday nights; it was canceled a year later. The 10 O'Clock News went on to become the longest-running prime time newscast in the Fresno market. On October 6, 2003, KMPH debuted a three-hour weekday morning newscast, titled Great Day; that same date, the station also launched a half-hour midday newscast at 11:30 a.m. In the spring of 2007, Great Day was expanded to five hours, running from 5 to 10 a.m.

In January 2006, KMPH began to produce a half-hour 11 p.m. newscast for sister station KFRE-TV; the newscast was unable to compete against the established late evening newscasts on KFSN-TV, KSEE and KGPE and was canceled the following year in February 2007, due to low ratings. On September 30, 2009, KMPH-TV became the second television station in the Fresno market (after KFSN, which made the upgrade in April 2007) to begin broadcasting its local newscasts in high definition. It was the first television station in the market to provide news video from the field in true high definition, as KMPH upgraded its ENG vehicles, satellite truck, studio and field cameras and other equipment in order to broadcast news footage from the field in high definition, in addition to segments broadcast from the main studio.

From 2013 to 2023, KMPH produced a newscast for sister station KPTM in Omaha, Nebraska; the program was produced from Fresno with contributions from Omaha-based reporters.

In July 2014, Politifact reported that KMPH, in a news story, claimed that the implementation of the Patient Protection and Affordable Care Act had increased the average emergency room wait time in California to five hours. Its reporting was deemed inaccurate, as it was based on statistics released by the California HealthCare Foundation in 2012, and not from after the implementation of the Affordable Care Act.

==== Notable current on-air staff ====
- Kopi Sotiropulos – anchor

==== Notable former on-air staff ====
- Vic "The Brick" Jacobs – sportscaster
- Lloyd Lindsay Young – weathercaster

== Technical information ==
=== KMPH-TV subchannels ===
The station's signal is multiplexed:

Subchannels of KMPH-TV
Subchannel	Res.	Short name	Programming
26.1	720p	KMPH-TV	Fox
26.2	480i	Dabl	Roar
26.3	480i	Comet	Comet
26.5	480i	Nest	The Nest
59.3	480i	ROAR	Roar (KFRE-TV)

Simulcast of subchannels of another station

=== KMPH-CD subchannel ===
Subchannel of KMPH-CD
Subchannel	Res.	Short name	Programming
17.1	480i	KMPH-CD	Fox (4:3)

In October 2009, KMPH began carrying This TV on digital subchannel 26.2. On October 31, 2015, Comet began airing on 26.3.

On October 1, 2019, KMPH-DT2 became an affiliate of Dabl, replacing This TV.

=== Analog-to-digital conversion ===
KMPH-TV shut down its analog signal, over UHF channel 26, on June 12, 2009, the official date on which full-power television in the United States transitioned from analog to digital broadcasts under federal mandate. The station's digital signal remained on its pre-transition UHF channel 28, using virtual channel 26.

== Out of market coverage ==
KMPH-TV's focus is on the San Joaquin Valley and Central California. The station's signal is receivable as far way as the Bakersfield area; however, local Fox affiliate and sister station KBFX-CD (itself once a KMPH repeater) is the only Fox station carried by cable providers in the Bakersfield market. Through its translator, KMPH-TV's signal extends northward to Merced, Mariposa and the southern Sierra Nevada, and sometimes can be received in Monterey County for those who live just north of King City. KMPH-TV has been received over the air sometimes in eastern Kern County (Ridgecrest) and San Luis Obispo.
