= Caroline Collins =

American news anchor (born 1993)

- Born: July 27, 1993 (age 33); West Middlesex, Pennsylvania, U.S.
- Education: Point Park University
- Occupations: anchor, reporter
- Employer: KRIV-TV
- Height: 1.68 m (5 ft 6 in)

Caroline Collins (born July 27, 1993) is an American weekday evening news anchor recently for KRIV-TV in Houston, Texas, United States. She gained attention for her Social Media posts during her time at KSEE-TV in Fresno, California. She co-hosted a nationally televised golf instructional show series, The Swing Clinic, which aired on Fox Sports. Collins was the face of national golf companies modeling for Golf Galaxy and Dick's Sporting Goods. She also competed for Miss Pennsylvania.

== Early life and college ==
Collins grew up in West Middlesex, Pennsylvania, where her father is a professional PGA golf instructor. Her parents entered her into beauty pageants to hone her public speaking skills. She attended Kennedy Catholic High School (Hermitage, Pennsylvania) and Point Park University in Pittsburgh, Pennsylvania on a full-ride athletic scholarship. She was on the PPU women's golf team where she won several events and made two holes-in-one within two weeks of one another and was All-Conference in her senior year. She received a bachelor's in broadcasting in 2015 and later a Master of Arts in communication technology, with a concentration in social media in 2019, both at PPU.

== Career ==
She launched her career in broadcasting at WJET–WFXP in Erie, Pennsylvania, where she was a general assignment reporter, fill-in anchor and producer. Afterward, she worked at WFMJ-TV in Youngstown, Ohio, as a weekend evening anchor, multi-media journalist, and co-hosted The Swing Clinic. It was her time in Fresno where she anchored the morning news and gained a following on TikTok and Instagram. She has over 1.3 million followers and 26 million likes on TikTok and over 320,000 followers on Instagram. While at KSEE in Fresno, California, also did a story for NBC's Today (American TV program) as a part of Today's “Spookiest House in America” segment. She made her debut for KRIV in 2023.On November of 2026, she announced she was leaving Fox 26 after nearly four years.
