= KGPE =

Television station in Fresno, California

- Fresno–Visalia–Merced, California; United States
- City: Fresno, California
- Channels: Digital: 34 (UHF); Virtual: 47
- Branding: CBS 47; CBS 47 Eyewitness News

Programming
- Affiliations: 47.1: CBS; for others, see § Subchannels

Ownership
- Owner: Nexstar Media Group; (Nexstar Media Inc.)
- Sister stations: KSEE

History
- First air date: October 1, 1953
- Former call signs: KJEO (1953–2000)
- Former channel numbers: Analog: 47 (UHF, 1953–2009); Digital: 14 (UHF, 2000–2002)
- Former affiliations: ABC (1953–1985); CBS (secondary, 1953–1956)
- Call sign meaning: "Grow, Protect, Enjoy" (Fresno's slogan)

Technical information
- Licensing authority: FCC
- Facility ID: 56034
- ERP: 185 kW
- HAAT: 577 m (1,893 ft)
- Transmitter coordinates: 37°4′14″N 119°25′34″W

Links
- Public license information: Public file; LMS
- Website: www.yourcentralvalley.com

KGPE (channel 47) is a television station in Fresno, California, United States, affiliated with CBS. It is owned by Nexstar Media Group alongside NBC affiliate KSEE (channel 24). The two stations share studios on McKinley Avenue in eastern Fresno; KGPE's transmitter is located on Bear Mountain (near Meadow Lakes).

== History ==
=== Early years ===
The station first signed on the air on October 1, 1953, as KJEO (for station founder Jack E. O'Neill); it was the second television station to sign on in the Fresno market, after KMJ-TV (channel 24, now KSEE), which debuted four months earlier on June 1. Channel 47 originally operated as a primary ABC affiliate with a secondary CBS affiliation. KFRE-TV (channel 12, now KFSN-TV on channel 30) took the CBS affiliation full-time when it signed on in May 1956, due to sister radio station KFRE (940 AM, now KYNO)'s longtime affiliation with the CBS Radio Network. Originally, the station was owned by O'Neill Broadcasting Company, which sold the station in 1961 to Shasta Telecasting Corporation. Retlaw Broadcasting, a unit of Retlaw Enterprises (a company owned by relatives of Walt Disney), acquired KJEO from Shasta Telecasting in 1968. On September 9, 1985, as a result of KFSN-TV's owner, Capital Cities Communications merging with ABC, KFSN became an ABC owned-and-operated station, sending the CBS affiliation to KJEO.

Fisher Broadcasting merged with Retlaw in 1998, then proceeded to sell channel 47 to the Ackerley Group in 2000. Under Ackerley, the station changed its call letters to KGPE on September 14, 2000, and revamped its news operation as News 47. Clear Channel Communications (now iHeartMedia) merged with Ackerley in 2001. The acquisition was approved by the Federal Communications Commission (FCC) and was finalized in 2002. Under Clear Channel, KGPE rebranded as CBS 47 On Your Side in October 2004.

=== Since 2007 ===
On April 20, 2007, Clear Channel entered into an agreement to sell its entire group of television stations to Newport Television, a broadcast holding company controlled by the private equity firm Providence Equity Partners. That sale was finalized on March 14, 2008. In mid-May 2008, Newport Television agreed to sell the license assets of KGPE and five other stations to High Plains Broadcasting, Inc. due to ownership conflicts as a result of Providence Equity Partners also holding a 19% ownership stake in Univision Communications, owner of Univision station KFTV-DT (channel 21) and Telefutura station KTFF-DT (channel 61). The sale closed on September 15, 2008; Newport continued to operate KGPE under a shared services agreement. This resulted in KGPE having its sixth owner over the course of ten years. KJEO/KGPE has long been one of CBS' weaker affiliates. However, in recent years, it has traded fourth and fifth place with KSEE in total day viewership. The November 2012 sweeps period had KGPE place just ahead of KSEE.

Newport Television agreed to sell KGPE, along with NBC affiliate KGET-TV and Telemundo affiliate KKEY-LP in Bakersfield, to Nexstar Broadcasting Group on November 5, 2012. The FCC approved the sale on January 23, 2013; which was completed on February 19. Nexstar subsequently announced the acquisition of KSEE from Granite Broadcasting, in the process forming a duopoly with KGPE. Normally, duopolies between two "Big Four" affiliates or even "Big Three" affiliates would not be allowed because such stations usually constituted among the four highest-rated stations in a market. FCC regulations do not allow common ownership of any two of the four top-rated stations in total day viewership in the same market. However, according to Nielsen, KGPE was ranked as the fourth highest-rated station in the market and KSEE placed fifth in total day viewership, allowing a duopoly to be formed between the stations. This marked the second instance (after the Gannett Company purchased ABC affiliate WJXX in Jacksonville, Florida, creating a duopoly with that market's NBC affiliate WTLV, in 2000) in which a single company owns a duopoly involving two stations that are affiliated by a Big Three television network; and is also Nexstar's first true Big Three duopoly (Nexstar's other Big Three duopolies are virtually formed, in which the other station is owned by Mission Broadcasting). The sale was consummated on May 31.

In May 2013, KGPE and KSEE's general manager Matt Rosenfield told The Fresno Bee that KGPE would be consolidated into the facilities of KSEE by the end of the year. New high definition-capable studios were built for the two stations. The station moved its operations from its longtime studio facility on First Street (across the street from Fashion Fair Mall) to the KSEE building on October 9, 2013 (which was renamed the McKinley Media Center, in reference to the street it is located on).

== News operation ==
KGPE's Eyewitness News logo since 2013.

KGPE presently broadcasts 31 hours, 35 minutes of locally produced newscasts each week (with 6 hours, 5 minutes each weekday and 35 minutes each on Saturdays and Sundays); unlike most CBS affiliates in the Pacific Time Zone, the station does not broadcast a newscast in the 5:30 p.m. timeslot on weekdays (the station instead fills that half-hour with syndicated programming) nor does it carry early evening newscasts on weekends. As of 2014, KGPE's newscasts are in second place in the Fresno market.

On December 5, 1987, during the start of the station's 5 p.m. newscast, a 21-year-old gun-wielding mental patient named David Dione Pretzer of Clovis, California, took sportscaster Marc Cotta hostage live on-air. The incident comes four months after a similar incident at KNBC-TV in Los Angeles involving Gary Stollman and consumer reporter David Horowitz. In Fresno's incident, Cotta was forced to read a letter that was written by Pretzer containing rambling quotes from the bible on the air. While reading the paper, the station immediately cut to a commercial before cutting to a long stretch of black. Like Stollman's hostage, the weapon used in the hostage was revealed as a toy gun.

In the late 1980s, the station debuted a 6:30 p.m. newscast, which bumped the CBS Evening News to 7 p.m.—the program was canceled in 1995; KGPE restored a 6:30 p.m. newscast in January 2007, which was canceled after a few months due to low ratings. The 5 p.m. newscast originally debuted in 1995, as a five-minute broadcast; it later expanded to a half-hour in September 1996. That year, the station debuted a weekday morning newscast. In 2001, the station expanded its early evening news programming with the addition of a 5:30 p.m. newscast; the program was canceled in 2002 due to low ratings. On October 9, 2013, a half-hour 7 p.m. weeknight newscast was added. On September 7, 2021, a half-hour 7:30 p.m. weeknight newscast was added. On September 6, 2022, an hour-long 4 p.m. weekday newscast was added. In September 2013, the 6 p.m. weekend newscast was indefinitely suspended.

After Nexstar finalized its acquisition of KSEE in April 2013, the two stations began sharing reporters and photographers, but continue to maintain separate on-air talent. Following the formal merger of KSEE and KGPE's news departments into the former's McKinley Avenue studios on October 9, 2013, KGPE revived the Eyewitness News title that was previously used by the station from 1978 until the late 1990s; the station's newscasts also adopted a fast-paced format focusing on breaking news and investigative reports.

=== Notable former on-air staff ===
- Susie Frankeberger – anchor (2000–2008)
- John Reed King – anchor/reporter
- Elita Loresca – weathercaster (2002–2004)
- Kent Ninomiya – reporter
- Meg Oliver – anchor/reporter (2001–2004)
- Rob Wolchek – investigative/feature reporter (1993–1997)

== Technical information ==
=== Subchannels ===
The station's signal is multiplexed:

Subchannels of KGPE
Subchannel	Res.	Short name	Programming
47.1	1080i	KGPE-HD	CBS
47.2	480i	Mystery	Ion Mystery
47.3	480i	AntTV	Antenna TV
47.4	480i	CourtTV	Outlaw
59.1	1080i	CW59	The CW (KFRE-TV)

Broadcast on behalf of another station

KGPE digital subchannel 47.2 originally carried programming from Untamed Sports TV beginning in 2010; in 2012, the subchannel switched its affiliation to ZUUS Country. After Nexstar took ownership of KGPE in 2014, the station dropped ZUUS Country. (ZUUS Country then moved to KMSG-LD channel 39.5) (with exceptions in some markets, one of them being KSEE (which continues to carry LATV on its digital channel 24.3), Nexstar seldom carries multicast networks or for that matter, additional subchannels on the majority of its stations), replacing it with a standard definition simulcast of its main channel.

=== Analog-to-digital conversion ===
KGPE shut down its analog signal, over UHF channel 47, on June 12, 2009, the official date on which full-power television in the United States transitioned from analog to digital broadcasts under federal mandate. The station's digital signal remained on its pre-transition UHF channel 34, using virtual channel 47.
