= KCFT-TV =

Television station in Concord, California (1966)

- Concord, California; United States
- Channels: Analog: 42 (UHF)

Ownership
- Owner: Jerry Bassett, Inc.

History
- First air date: February 5, 1966
- Last air date: September 19, 1966; (226 days)

Technical information
- ERP: 269 kW
- HAAT: 165 m (540 ft)

KCFT-TV (channel 42) was an independent television station in Concord, California, United States. The station was owned by Jerry Bassett, Inc., and broadcast for seven months in 1966.

== History ==
Jerry Bassett, Inc., filed in 1965 to move channel 16, an educational reserved assignment at Cotati, to Concord for immediate commercial use; Bassett had previously managed a Contra Costa County radio station, KKIS. The Federal Communications Commission declined but instead suggested moving channel 42, another reserved assignment, from Stockton to nearby Pittsburg, where it could still be used in Concord under a rule permitting the use of an allocation in a nearby community within 15 miles (24 km). Bassett then received a construction permit for channel 42 on May 25, 1965. The station was initially planned for a November 1 debut, broadcasting from a transmitter and interim studios on Willow Pass Road between Pittsburg and Concord and utilizing offices on A Street in Concord; however, the station struggled to obtain local and tower permits in a timely manner.

KCFT-TV had signed on the air on February 5, 1966. At that year's National Association of Broadcasters convention, Bassett stated that the total investment made in starting the station was $470,000; despite eliminating what he called "frills and extras", the station's programming still included daily hours of news and sports. However, much of the rest of it was older fare; San Francisco Examiner television columnist Dwight Newton described KCFT-TV's lineup as "mostly a collection of network and syndicated films revisited".

Severe undercapitalization did the station in quickly. As early as July, it was public knowledge that channel 42 was in "difficult financial straits". As time passed, the number of hours of programming per day dropped from 16 to 3, while just two personnel remained. The September 12 edition of Broadcasting magazine carried an ad declaring KCFT-TV for sale, boasting of its color film capabilities and six cameras. The week that followed saw two lawsuits for nonpayment, from program distributor ITC Entertainment and equipment manufacturer Sarkes Tarzian; channel 42 slated a telethon auction on September 17 and 18 in a desperate bid to raise funds, with Bassett noting that he needed a "miracle". It was not to be. The station met its end on September 19, when representatives of equipment manufacturer General Electric arrived at the station with a moving van, a deputy sheriff, a locksmith, and a court order to repossess some $128,000 in equipment that was not fully paid for. A bankruptcy court allowed the station to try and raise additional funds, but in November, the bankruptcy court appointed a trustee and ordered its sale with a January 1967 deadline for bids.

The permit was sold in 1969 to a consortium known as T.V. Hill, a joint venture of Television Communications Inc. and Watson Communications Systems Inc., for $13,500. The new permittees filed to have the channel assignment moved to Concord proper, citing its larger population and definition of Concord as partly in the San Francisco media market, whereas Pittsburg was entirely in the Sacramento market. Meanwhile, Bassett filed a $3.4 million lawsuit against General Electric and a Walnut Creek bank, alleging that he had stopped paying the manufacturer after the equipment delivered was found to be defective.

On May 7, 1971, the KCFT-TV permit and call letters were deleted at the request of the permittee, but the FCC still decided to approve the allocation shift. Channel 42 would return to the air on June 19, 1983, as KFCB (now KTNC-TV).
