= KTFF-DT =

Television station in Porterville, California

- Porterville–Fresno, California; United States
- City: Porterville, California
- Channels: Digital: 23 (UHF); Virtual: 61
- Branding: UniMás 61 Fresno

Programming
- Affiliations: 61.1: UniMás; 61.2: Univision (KFTV-DT); for others, see § Subchannels

Ownership
- Owner: TelevisaUnivision; (UniMas Fresno LLC)
- Sister stations: KFTV-DT

History
- First air date: May 6, 1992
- Former call signs: KKAK (1992–1994); KKAG (1994–1998); KPXF (1998–2003); KTFF (2003); KTFF-TV (2004–2009)
- Former channel numbers: Analog: 61 (UHF, 1992–2009); Digital: 48 (UHF, 2003–2018)
- Former affiliations: Independent (1992–1998); Pax TV (1998–2003); The Worship Network (overnight, 2003–?)
- Call sign meaning: Telefutura Fresno

Technical information
- Licensing authority: FCC
- Facility ID: 35512
- ERP: 330 kW
- HAAT: 811 m (2,661 ft)
- Transmitter coordinates: 36°17′13.5″N 118°50′19″W
- Translator(s): KTFF-LD 41 Fresno; KFTV-DT 21.6 Hanford

Links
- Public license information: Public file; LMS
- Website: www.univision.com/unimas

KTFF-DT (channel 61) is a television station licensed to Porterville, California, United States, broadcasting the Spanish-language UniMás network to the Fresno area. It is owned and operated by TelevisaUnivision alongside Hanford-licensed Univision outlet KFTV-DT (channel 21). The two stations share studios at the Univision Fresno Broadcast Center on Univision Plaza near the corner of North Palm and West Herndon avenues in northwestern Fresno; KTFF's transmitter is located on Blue Ridge in rural northwestern Tulare County.

The station's programming is relayed to the northern half of the market on low-power translator station KTFF-LD (channel 41) in Fresno, with transmitter on Bald Mountain near Meadow Lakes. It is also simulcast in high-definition on KFTV-DT's sixth digital subchannel (channel 21.6) from a separate transmitter on Bald Mountain.

== History ==
The station first signed on the air on May 6, 1992, as KKAK; originally operating as an independent station, it aired a mix of infomercials, religious and home shopping programs. The station changed its call letters to KKAG in 1994. In 1998, KKAG was sold to Paxson Communications (now Ion Media Networks). On August 31 of that year, the station became an owned-and-operated station of Paxson's family-oriented television network Pax TV upon its launch, and changed its call letters to KPXF. In 2003, Paxson sold KPXF to Univision Communications, creating a duopoly with Univision O&O KFTV (channel 21); after the sale was finalized, the station's calls were changed to KTFF, it also became an owned-and-operated station of Univision's secondary network TeleFutura (which relaunched as UniMás on February 7, 2013).

Univision subsequently purchased Shop at Home affiliate KAJA-LP (channel 68, now on channel 41) from Cocola Broadcasting to become a fill-in translator for KTFF, adopting the KTFF-LD call letters (ironically, the KAJA calls are currently used as a brand name for low-power station K68DJ in Corpus Christi, Texas, which also broadcasts on UHF channel 68).

In 2007, the Federal Communications Commission (FCC) issued an order concerning KTFF and former owner Paxson Communications, denying a review of the sale of KTFF to Univision; it also implemented a deal with Christian Network, Inc. (CNI), parent company of The Worship Network (which formerly carried its programming on Pax TV's stations as both an overnight block and later as a dedicated subchannel service), giving the religious broadcaster the right to program KTFF seven days a week from 1 to 6 a.m. In addition, the station was required to provide a digital channel for CNI's exclusive use (so long as certain conditions are met), after KTFF signed on its digital signal, if it used two or more subchannel slots. However, as of 2014, KTFF broadcasts UniMás programming full-time, though the date the station stopped carrying The Worship Network is unknown. It is also unknown if the discontinuance is tied to Pax's successor, Ion Television, ending carriage of The Worship Network in 2010.

== Technical information ==
=== Subchannels ===
The station's signal is multiplexed:

Subchannels of KTFF-DT
Subchannel	Res.	Short name	Programming
61.1	720p	KTFF-DT	UniMás
61.2	720p	KFTV-HD	Univision (KFTV-DT)
61.3	480i	Quest	Quest
61.4	480i	ShopLC	MovieSphere Gold
61.5	480i	Nosey	Nosey
61.6	480i	BT2	Infomercials (4:3)

Simulcast of subchannels of another station
Subchannel broadcast with MPEG-4 video

=== Translator ===
- KTFF-LD 31 Fresno

=== Analog-to-digital conversion ===
KTFF-TV shut down its analog signal, over UHF channel 61, on June 12, 2009, the official date on which full-power television stations in the United States transitioned from analog to digital broadcasts under federal mandate. The station's digital signal remained on its pre-transition UHF channel 48, using virtual channel 61.

=== Spectrum auction repack ===
KTFF-DT is one of nearly 1,000 television stations that were required to change their digital channel allocation in the spectrum auction repack in late 2017 or early 2018. KTFF was to reallocate its digital signal to UHF channel 23 in phase one of the repack. The FCC licensed the station to broadcast on channel 23 on December 20, 2018.
