= KFSN-TV =

Television station in Fresno, California

- Fresno–Visalia, California; United States
- City: Fresno, California
- Channels: Digital: 30 (UHF); Virtual: 30
- Branding: ABC30; ABC30 Action News

Programming
- Affiliations: 30.1: ABC; for others, see § Subchannels

Ownership
- Owner: ABC Owned Television Stations; (KFSN Television, LLC)

History
- First air date: May 10, 1956
- Former call signs: KFRE-TV (1956–1971)
- Former channel numbers: Analog: 12 (VHF, 1956–1961), 30 (UHF, 1961–2009); Digital: 9 (VHF, 2001–2009)
- Former affiliations: CBS (1956–1985)
- Call sign meaning: Fresno

Technical information
- Licensing authority: FCC
- Facility ID: 8620
- ERP: 400 kW
- HAAT: 625 m (2,051 ft)
- Transmitter coordinates: 37°4′36″N 119°26′3″W

Links
- Public license information: Public file; LMS
- Website: abc30.com

KFSN-TV (channel 30) is a television station in Fresno, California, United States. It is owned and operated by the ABC network through its ABC Owned Television Stations division, and maintains studios on G Street in downtown Fresno; its transmitter is located on Bear Mountain, near Meadow Lakes, California. The station originally operated as KFRE-TV from 1956 to 1971 when new owners changed the call sign to KFSN-TV.

Fresno is the smallest television market in California with a "Big Four" network O&O. (Note: Since Capital Cities Communications was re-branded in 1985 to re-launch the ABC Owned Television Stations in 1986. According to RabbitEars.info, the Fresno–Visalia area (Central California region) has ranked 42nd, while the market was ranked 55th by Nielsen.)

== History ==
=== As KFRE-TV ===
After the Federal Communications Commission (FCC)'s four-year-long freeze on awarding television station licenses was lifted in 1952, two radio stations—KARM (1430 AM, now KFIG) and KFRE (940 AM, now KYNO) competed for the construction permit to operate a station on channel 12, the sole VHF allocation given to Fresno. KFRE won the permit. Following completion of a 316-kilowatt transmitter at Meadow Lakes, California, in Fresno County, KFRE-TV first went on the air on a stand-by basis on May 10, 1956. The station became fully operational on June 5, 1956, as an affiliate of CBS. It broadcast as Channel 12 to the entire San Joaquin Valley. The programming included popular television shows such as Mighty Mouse, I Love Lucy, Ed Sullivan, I've Got a Secret, Gunsmoke and Jack Benny. It is the third-oldest television station in the Fresno market in a three-year timeframe and upon signing on, KFRE-TV took the CBS affiliation from KJEO (channel 47, now KGPE). This made Fresno one of the smallest markets where each network gained full-time affiliations at the time.

The KFRE stations were acquired by Triangle Publications in 1959. On February 17, 1961, KFRE-TV switched to UHF channel 30 to make Fresno an all-UHF market under orders from the FCC. Known by the term deintermixture, the move was made for the purpose of leveling the playing field and eliminating the potential of unfair competition between the VHF and UHF bands. A similar situation occurred in nearby Bakersfield where that city's lone VHF station, KERO-TV on channel 10, moved to UHF channel 23 in 1963. The move of KFRE-TV to channel 30 opened up channel 12 for use by KCOY-TV in Santa Maria, which went on the air in 1964.

=== As KFSN-TV ===
Triangle began its exit from broadcasting in 1971, and sold the KFRE stations to Capital Cities Communications. The new owners sold off the AM and FM radio stations as a condition of the purchase and kept the television station. The new ownership received approval from the FCC to change the call letters from KFRE-TV to KFSN-TV on May 1, 1971. (The KFRE-TV call letters were later adopted by Fresno's CW affiliate on channel 59. That station is unrelated to the current KFSN-TV).

On March 18, 1985, Capital Cities announced it would purchase ABC. Nearly six months later, on September 9, 1985, KFSN-TV traded network affiliations with KJEO and became an ABC affiliate. The transaction was finalized on January 3, 1986, making channel 30 an ABC owned-and-operated station. It marked the first time a Big Three network owned a UHF television station since NBC sold WNBC (now WVIT) in New Britain, Connecticut, to Plains Television in 1960 (NBC would buy the station back from the original incarnation of Viacom in 1997). In 1996, The Walt Disney Company acquired Capital Cities/ABC.

KFSN-TV shut down its analog signal, over UHF channel 30, at noon on June 12, 2009, the official date on which full-power television stations in the United States transitioned from analog to digital broadcasts under federal mandate. The station's digital signal relocated from its pre-transition VHF channel 9 to UHF channel 30.

ABC News Now was launched in 2004 on digital subchannels of ABC O&O stations and lasting until January 31, 2005, as the channel ended its experimental phase. The group changed its programming on secondary channels to ABC Plus, a local news and public affairs format. ABC teamed up with AccuWeather to launch a multicast service starting on ABC stations' third subchannel with the second station taking on the service was KFSN-TV in late 2005. On April 27, 2009, KFSN began carrying the Live Well Network on a second digital subchannel.

The station carried a Live Well Network standard definition simulcast that was carried on digital subchannel 30.3 until it was replaced with Laff on April 15, 2015. ABC Owned Television Stations took its Localish digital media venture promoted by KFSN and other stations then rebranded its Live Well Network as Localish on February 17, 2020.

== Programming ==
KFSN-TV serves as the production company for two programs seen on the Live Well Network, now called Localish, Motion and My Family Recipe Rocks.

=== News operation ===
KFSN's logo for newscasts, used from 2022.

KFSN-TV presently broadcasts 42 hours of locally produced newscasts each week (with seven hours each weekday and 3 1/2 hours each on Saturdays and Sundays); in regards to the number of hours devoted to news programming, it is the highest local newscast output among the broadcast television stations in the Fresno market. Unlike most ABC affiliates in the Pacific Time Zone, the station does not broadcast a 5:30 p.m. newscast on weekdays, opting to fill the half-hour with ABC World News Tonight (as a result of that program airing one hour earlier than other ABC stations in the time zone, KFSN airs an extension of its 6 p.m. newscast in World News' recommended 6:30 timeslot). In addition, the station produces the public affairs program Valley Focus, which airs Sundays at 10 a.m.

KFSN's newscasts, known as Action News, have dominated the local news ratings in the San Joaquin Valley for decades, dating back to its pre-ABC-merger years as a CBS affiliate. Its 5 p.m. newscast, Live at Five frequently attracted more viewers than all other area stations combined.

In 2003, the station began pooling resources with sister stations KABC-TV in Los Angeles and KGO-TV to hire a full-time reporter and photographer to staff a Sacramento bureau following Arnold Schwarzenegger's election as Governor during the 2003 California recall election; the Sacramento bureau was shut down in September 2013. On April 23, 2007, beginning with the 5 p.m. newscast, KFSN-TV became the seventh ABC owned-and-operated station to begin broadcasting their local newscasts in high definition (following its sister stations KABC-TV, WPVI-TV, WABC-TV in New York City, WLS-TV in Chicago, KGO-TV in San Francisco and KTRK-TV in Houston) and updated its news branding to ABC30 Action News HD.

On September 12, 2011, KFSN launched an hour-long 4 p.m. newscast, which replaced The Oprah Winfrey Show. This follows the trend of the four other sister stations (WABC-TV, WPVI-TV, KGO-TV and WTVD in Durham, North Carolina) that started their own 4 p.m. newscast after Oprah ended its syndication run. On January 7, 2013, KFSN began producing a half-hour 10 p.m. newscast for then-MyNetworkTV affiliate KAIL (channel 7); the program, titled ABC30 Action News Live at 10:00, ended in July 2014.

==== Notable former on-air staff ====
- Laura Diaz – anchor (1981–1983)
- Karen Humphrey – reporter (1970s)

== Subchannels ==
The station's signal is multiplexed:

Subchannels of KFSN-TV
Subchannel	Res.	Short name	Programming
30.1	720p	KFSN	ABC
30.2	720p	LOCLish	Localish
30.3	480i	Charge!	Charge!
30.4	480i	HSN	HSN
