= KFRE-TV =

Television station in Sanger, California

ATSC 3.0 station
- Sanger–Fresno, California; United States
- City: Sanger, California
- Channels: Digital: 36 (UHF); Virtual: 59
- Branding: CW 59

Programming
- Affiliations: 59.1: The CW; for others, see § Subchannels

Ownership
- Owner: Sinclair Broadcast Group; (KFRE Licensee, LLC)
- Sister stations: KMPH-TV

History
- First air date: July 17, 1985
- Former call signs: KMSG (1984–1985); KMSG-TV (1985–2001)
- Former channel number: Analog: 59 (UHF, 1985–2009)
- Former affiliations: Independent (1985–1989); Telemundo (secondary 1987–1989, primary 1989–2001); The WB (2001–2006); FoxBox/4Kids TV (secondary, 2003–2008)
- Call sign meaning: Fresno

Technical information
- Licensing authority: FCC
- Facility ID: 59013
- ERP: 360 kW
- HAAT: 607 m (1,991 ft)
- Transmitter coordinates: 37°4′37″N 119°26′4″W

Links
- Public license information: Public file; LMS
- Website: kmph.com/the-cw/cw-kfre-59

KFRE-TV (channel 59) is a television station licensed to Sanger, California, United States, serving the Fresno area as an affiliate of The CW. It is owned by Sinclair Broadcast Group alongside Visalia-licensed Fox affiliate KMPH-TV (channel 26). The two stations share studios on McKinley Avenue in eastern Fresno; KFRE-TV's transmitter is located on Bear Mountain (near Meadow Lakes).

Channel 59 began broadcasting as KMSG-TV on July 17, 1985. Originally planned as a music video station, original owners Sanger Telecasters instead programmed it as an independent station with an emphasis on religious programs. It became a Telemundo affiliate gradually between 1988 and 1989 and briefly aired local news programming between 1996 and 1999. After Telemundo opted to move its programming to KNSO (channel 51) on January 1, 2001, channel 59 became Fresno's affiliate of The WB under the operation and later ownership of Pappas Telecasting; The WB programs had previously aired on channel 51. In 2006, the station experimented with an 11 p.m. newscast, which attracted few viewers, and became an affiliate of The CW when The WB merged with UPN. The station was sold twice between 2009 and 2013.

== History ==
=== Early years ===
Five applicants filed with the Federal Communications Commission (FCC) by 1982 for the rights to build a television station on channel 59, allocated to Sanger, California. Only one of the groups, Sanger Telecasters Inc., was local to the area, with the others being out-of-area firms. The group included Gary Cocola, owner of a fruit company in Pinedale, and his wife Diane.

After settling with the other applicants, Sanger Telecasters received a construction permit in March 1984. The station was intended to broadcast music videos with local video jockeys handling the programming. However, it missed its planned 1984 start-up date because the transmitter—being specially built to enable the station to telecast stereo sound—was not ready in time. During this time, the Cocolas visited WLXI-TV in Greensboro, North Carolina, and KRLR in Las Vegas, which had adopted similar formats and had low cash flow. They came to the conclusion that audience acceptance would be high but the youth-targeted station would not attract major national advertisers, leading them by March 1985 to abandon the music video plan and propose a predominantly religious lineup. When KMSG-TV began broadcasting on July 17, 1985, it also offered local programming for the Sanger area, some shows in Spanish and Japanese, and children's programs.

In March 1988, KMSG-TV joined Telemundo, a Spanish-language network, and began airing 2 1/2 hours of news and telenovelas on weekdays. The move came at a time when religious programs were experiencing a downturn due to recent scandals involving televangelists. By early 1989, the evening programming had expanded to 5 1/2 hours, and some Telemundo shows also were airing on weekends. Another expansion of Telemundo programming came in February 1990 and saw the cancellation of much of the station's existing English-language local programming. Cocola had tried to go all-Telemundo as early as August 1989, but the switch was delayed until the Home Shopping Network, another major presence on channel 59, could be broadcast on a new low-power station.

Gary Cocola sold his stake in KMSG-TV in 1991 as part of a divorce settlement. Five years later, KMSG launched a weeknight news program, competing directly with Univision station KFTV (channel 21), followed by a morning news and talk show, Mañanas Alegres (Happy Mornings). The weeknight program became a 6 p.m. newscast, Noticiero 59, in November 1997. The newscast—never a competitor against KFTV—lasted until April 1999, when it was canceled and the 10 employees that produced it laid off. The decision coincided with a move by Telemundo to begin programming 17 hours a week that previously belonged to local affiliates, in which KMSG programmed profitable infomercials.

=== WB and CW affiliation ===
In August 2000, KNSO (channel 51) signed a deal to become the Fresno market's new Telemundo affiliate. Its owner, Sainte Partners, already was associated with Telemundo in Sacramento. Though KMSG looked into alternative sources of Spanish-language programming, Pappas Telecasting terminated a local marketing agreement (LMA) between KNSO and Fox affiliate KMPH (channel 26) under which Pappas had programmed The WB in prime time on channel 51. On January 1, 2001, Pappas began operating channel 59 on a full-time basis, including WB programs. Fourteen KMSG employees lost their jobs under the deal, which gave Pappas an option to buy channel 59 outright after two years. With the switch, KMSG changed call signs to KFRE-TV.

KFRE logo, used from 2007 to 2011.

Pappas exercised its option to buy KFRE-TV purchasing the station from Sanger Telecasters for $25 million in a deal announced in December 2003 and completed in March 2004. In January 2006, Pappas debuted an 11 p.m. newscast for KFRE aimed at an audience aged 18–49, using the resources of KMPH-TV's news department. When The WB merged with UPN to form The CW in September 2006, KFRE-TV became the network's Fresno affiliate as part of a deal covering Pappas stations in nine markets. The KFRE newscast was canceled in February 2007, after ratings surveys found that about 1,000 viewers a night watched, in order to reallocate resources to KMPH's morning show, Great Day.

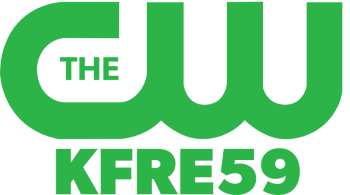
KFRE-TV logo from 2011 to 2018.

On May 10, 2008, thirteen Pappas stations, including KFRE, filed for Chapter 11 bankruptcy protection. As a result of the bankruptcy, Pappas Telecasting Companies was given until February 15, 2009, to sell these stations to other owners. On January 16, 2009, Pappas announced that most of the stations, including KFRE, would be purchased by New World TV Group, after the sale received United States bankruptcy court approval; the stations would eventually come under the Titan TV Broadcast Group banner. Titan announced the sale of KFRE-TV, KMPH-TV and most of the company's other stations to the Sinclair Broadcast Group on June 3, 2013. The FCC approved the sale on September 19, and the sale was finalized on October 3.

KFRE-TV has been digital-only since June 12, 2009.

== Technical information ==
=== Subchannels ===
The station's ATSC 1.0 channels are carried on the multiplexed signals of other Fresno television stations:

Subchannels provided by KFRE-TV (ATSC 1.0)
Subchannel	Res.	Short name	Programming	ATSC 1.0 host
59.1	1080i	CW59	The CW	KGPE
59.2	480i	Charge	Charge!	KNSO
59.3	480i	ROAR	Roar	KMPH-TV
59.4	1080i	FOX26	Fox (KMPH-TV)	KSEE

Simulcast of subchannels of another station

=== ATSC 3.0 lighthouse ===
Subchannels of KFRE-TV (ATSC 3.0)
Subchannel	Res.	Short name	Programming
24.1	1080p	KSEE	NBC (KSEE)
26.1	720p	KMPH	Fox (KMPH-TV)
26.10	1080p	T2	T2
26.11	1080p	PBTV	Pickleballtv
47.1	1080p	KGPE	CBS (KGPE)
51.1	1080p	KNSO	Telemundo (KNSO)
59.1	1080p	KFRE	The CW

Subchannel broadcast with digital rights management
Subchannel streamed via the Internet
