= Meadow Lakes, California =

Unincorporated community in California, United States

Meadow Lakes
- Unincorporated community
- Location in California Meadow Lakes (the United States)
- Coordinates: 37°04′49″N 119°25′50″W
- Country: United States
- State: California
- County: Fresno
- Elevation: 4,452 ft (1,357 m)

Meadow Lakes is an unincorporated community in Fresno County, California, United States. It is located 6.5 miles (10 km) west-southwest of Shaver Lake Heights, at an elevation of 4452 feet (1357 m).

== History ==
The development of Meadow Lakes was first envisioned in the 1920s by Judge Ernest Walling and associates Jean Vincenz and Lloyd Jackson. The Walling led group in 1927 purchased a large property of 1280 acres, a small portion of which was to include their to be named Meadow Lakes subdivision, from Alva Snow and his wife Dora P. Snow. Later, during the Great Depression, the Snow's again became owners of a portion of the Meadow Lakes subdivision, including various unsold lots, its water system, and surrounding properties.

A post office operated at Meadow Lakes from 1930 to 1933, with a closure for a time in 1932.
