= KMEX-DT =

Television station in Los Angeles

- Los Angeles, California; United States
- Channels: Digital: 34 (UHF); Virtual: 34
- Branding: Univision 34; Noticias N+ Univision Los Ángeles (newscasts)

Programming
- Affiliations: 34.1: Univision; 34.2: UniMás; for others, see § Subchannels

Ownership
- Owner: TelevisaUnivision; (KMEX License Partnership, G.P.)
- Sister stations: KFTR-DT; KLVE; KLXM/KLXO; KSCA

History
- First air date: September 29, 1962
- Former call signs: KMEX-TV (1962–2009)
- Former channel numbers: Analog: 34 (UHF, 1962–2009); Digital: 35 (UHF, 2002–2009)
- Former affiliations: Spanish International Network (1962–1987)
- Call sign meaning: "Mexico"

Technical information
- Licensing authority: FCC
- Facility ID: 35123
- ERP: 500 kW
- HAAT: 956 m (3,136 ft)
- Transmitter coordinates: 34°13′36.1″N 118°4′2.3″W

Links
- Public license information: Public file; LMS
- Website: www.univision.com/local/los-angeles-kmex

KMEX-DT (channel 34) is a television station in Los Angeles, California, United States. It is the West Coast flagship station of the Spanish-language network Univision, owned and operated by TelevisaUnivision. Under common ownership with Ontario, California–licensed UniMás station KFTR-DT (channel 46), the two stations share studios on Center Drive (overlooking I-405) in Westchester; KMEX-DT's transmitter is located atop Mount Wilson.

KMEX was built by the Spanish International Broadcasting Company, a consortium that included American and Mexican stockholders, and began broadcasting in September 1962. It was the first full-time Spanish-language television station in the state of California and the only one in the Los Angeles area for 23 years. Its programming combined Mexican programs from Telesistema Mexicano, predecessor to Televisa, with local features relevant to the Spanish-speaking community in Los Angeles, such as courses in the English language. Spanish International Broadcasting Company grew to create the national Spanish International Network. In 1964, Danny Villanueva, then a placekicker in the NFL, began an association with the station. After retiring from football, Villanueva became KMEX's news director and later its station manager. Under Villanueva, KMEX adopted an "advocacy journalism" approach to local news and community involvement which has been adopted by much of its portion of the television industry. Ruben Salazar, a former writer for the Los Angeles Times, was working for KMEX when he was killed by riot police in August 1970; the station's retrospective coverage of the event earned it its first of two Peabody Awards.

KMEX and its co-owned stations, owned by Spanish International Communications Corporation (SICC), spent most of the 1980s embroiled in a legal dispute over the permissibility of its partially foreign ownership. In 1985, Federal Communications Commission staff recommended that all of SICC's licenses be revoked. The dispute was settled two years later by a forced sale of the stations and network to a venture of Hallmark Cards and First Chicago Ventures, which renamed the network Univision. Also in that decade, KMEX gained its first full-time competition when channel 52 was sold and switched from subscription programming to full-time Spanish as KVEA. That station's new owners, a group led by Saul Steinberg, used KVEA and other stations as the springboard to launch the competing Telemundo network in 1987. In spite of the new competition, KMEX continued to be the leading Spanish-language local TV station in news coverage and began garnering higher ratings than its English-language counterparts in key demographic groups. Its news presenters included María Elena Salinas and Jorge Ramos, both of whom went on to work for the Univision network. KMEX was the first Spanish-language TV station in the country to air an hour-long local morning show.

Univision grew from one Los Angeles–market station to two in 2002 when it acquired the USA Broadcasting group, including KFTR. In the 2010s, KMEX has had to fend off a challenge from a revitalized KVEA while expanding and refreshing its own news offerings.

== History ==
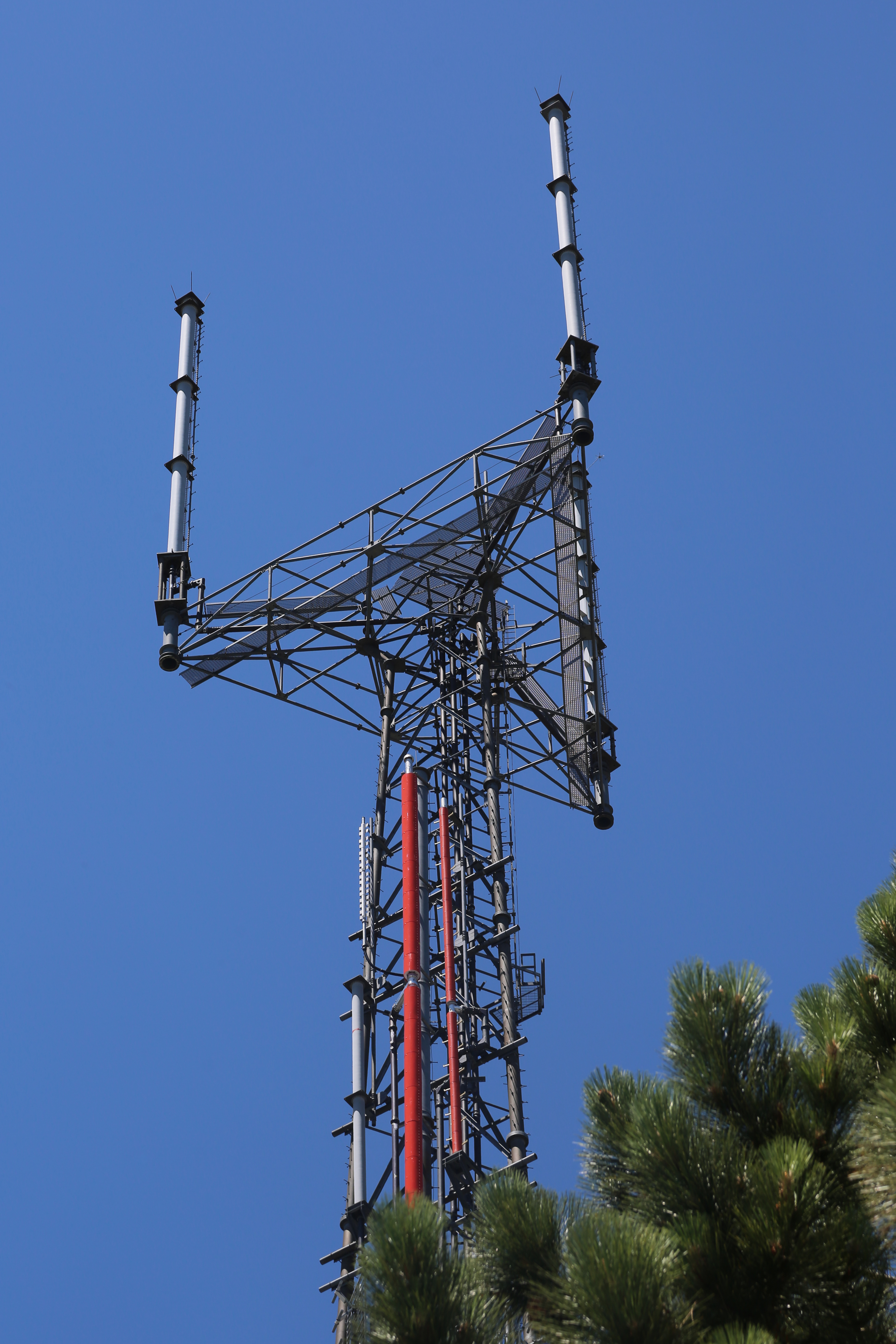
The Univision tower on Mount Wilson. The top-mounted antenna at left is used for KMEX-DT.

There were two prior attempts to build a station on ultra high frequency (UHF) channel 34 in Los Angeles prior to KMEX-TV, in proceedings in 1954 and 1958. By 1953, the Federal Communications Commission (FCC) had received three applications for the channel, from Lawrence Harvey; Spanish International Television; and radio station KFWB (980 AM). The bid of Spanish International Television presaged that of Spanish International Broadcasting Company six years later; Emilio Azcárraga Vidaurreta was a 20 percent owner of the firm. Harvey and Spanish International Television lost interest, and their applications were dismissed in 1954, leaving the door open for KFWB. That October, however, the radio station dropped its bid; no reason was given.

Interest around the UHF allocation was revived in 1957, and in 1958, the FCC selected the application of Sherrill C. Corwin, movie theater operator from San Francisco, over a bid from Frederick Bassett and William E. Sullivan. After the FCC ordered several unbuilt UHF stations to make progress or lose their permits, Corwin proposed to sell the construction permit for what was called KMYR to Franklin James, who owned part of several regional radio stations. However, this never was completed, and the FCC deleted the KMYR permit in November 1960 (along with another Corwin held for a San Diego outlet), leaving the door open for new applications for channel 34.

=== The early years ===
On August 18, 1961, the Spanish International Broadcasting Company (SIBC) filed an application to build a new channel 34 TV station in Los Angeles. SIBC's principals reflected strong Mexican connections: Azcárraga was a 20-percent stakeholder, with the balance being held by a number of stockholders including movie theater owner Frank Fouce, the largest shareholder, and Julian Kaufman, the general manager of Tijuana's binational TV station, XETV. The FCC granted the permit on November 1, 1961, marking the first time the commission had approved an application specifying an all-foreign language TV station. From Mexico City came Rene Anselmo to manage channel 34; so too would come much of the programming, from Telesistema Mexicano.

It was also the first regular commercial UHF television station in Los Angeles. Two stations had previously operated on the band: KTHE (channel 28), a short-lived educational station at the University of Southern California, and KBIC-TV (channel 22), whose only telecasts to that point had been of an experimental nature. To get the Spanish-speaking community to be able to tune in, the upstart channel 34 embarked on a $100,000 public awareness campaign for UHF converters, and manufacturers stocked stores in East Los Angeles with tuning strips. While channel 34 had been set for a September 15 launch, interest in converters was so great that the station opted to broadcast the test pattern until September 30 to aid dealers installing equipment.

The first day of KMEX-TV programming included an inaugural program; filmed coverage of the recent visit of President John F. Kennedy to Mexico City; sporting coverage, including bullfighting; and news. Some 30,000 converters were estimated to be in place at launch. By February 1963, there were 106,000 appropriately equipped households who could tune in the UHF station, and that number had swelled to almost 200,000 by the end of channel 34's first year in service. However, KMEX lost $500,000 in its first year and did not turn a profit until three years after starting up. Joseph S. Rank, an account executive with sales representative Blair Television, became general manager in November 1964 and was promoted to station vice president in 1966, also being a five-percent stockholder in the Spanish International Broadcasting Corporation.

In local production, the station placed a focus on public service programming to supplement the Telesistema Mexicano programs that came from Mexico City on Greyhound buses. One of the earliest programs was Escuela ("School"), an educational program that aired four times a week and taught basic English to viewers of all nationalities. Beginning in 1964, the program was hosted by Ginger Cory, a teacher for the Los Angeles Unified School District. Students mailed written exercises to Cory for grading. Many in Southern California's non-English-speaking community came to consider Cory as a friend and counselor. After station executives found that as much as 15 percent of KMEX's audience were not Spanish-speakers, courses in Spanish were added by popular demand. When American president Lyndon B. Johnson and Mexican president Adolfo López Mateos met in Los Angeles in February 1964, channel 34 produced commercial-free coverage which was sent to XETV and Telesistema Mexicano; the decision not to take advertisements was made because there was a desire to avoid any misunderstandings among the Spanish-speaking community. Also in 1964 was channel 34's first coverage of the Tournament of Roses Parade, with radio commentators utilizing visuals furnished by KTLA; previously, Spanish-language coverage on other stations consisted of a radio simulcast.

While still with the Los Angeles Rams, the team's kicker, Danny Villanueva, became a sports announcer for the station in 1964; he continued in this role even after being traded to the Dallas Cowboys. He remained at channel 34 after retiring from the NFL, becoming its news director, and was promoted by Rank to station manager in 1969. Villanueva increased the public service emphasis at channel 34 even further, describing the station as "a cross between a commercial and an educational station" with a "tremendous social obligation". Much of this philosophy was later copied by other Spanish-language TV stations in the United States.

KMEX had been the second American station (after KWEX-TV in San Antonio, Texas) in what was the Spanish International Network; the venture also included Telesistema Mexicano-aligned stations along the United States–Mexico border. After buying into New York City-area station WXTV and Miami's WLTV, in 1972, SIN made its first western expansion when it built KFTV, serving Fresno, with Villanueva as its general manager. Originally, the Fresno station operated as a direct satellite of KMEX. The "SIN West" subnetwork also provided service to affiliated stations in Modesto (KLOC-TV) and San Francisco (KEMO-TV) and Telesistema Mexicano's XEWT-TV in Tijuana and XHBC-TV in Mexicali.

=== NFB ===
In 1973, channel 34 unveiled an experimental daytime programming effort aimed at a different audience: English speakers. On July 9, KMEX-TV started at 6:30 a.m. and premiered NFB (News, Finance, Business), the first-ever attempt at a rolling news television program, which aired for 8 1/2 hours. Boasting a staff of 28 including 11 on-air talent, NFB featured John Harlan as one of its anchors and Bill Stout and Susan Stafford, as well as Villanueva, as contributors. However, it exceeded its budget by 100 percent, and when SIBC parent Spanish International Communications Corporation (SICC) could not obtain funding in a tight financial market, the program was pulled on October 26, having lost $300,000. Villanueva felt that, if funding had been available, such a service would have been a "tremendous success" in the long run. Other reasons cited for its failure were its association with channel 34, a Spanish-language television station, and airing on the lesser-viewed UHF band.

=== Univision and competition ===
SICC had an increasingly convoluted ownership structure and several related businesses. In 1974, the company took a bank loan that required it to not expand until the loan was repaid. As a result, to fuel continued expansion, SICC principals created two additional companies to start new stations: Bahía de San Francisco Television Company (which built KDTV in San Francisco) and Legend of Cibola Television Company (which reorganized as Seven Hills Television and started KTVW in Phoenix). In 1975, Anselmo arranged a new bank loan which came with a realignment of control that favored Anselmo and Azcárraga's interest. As a result, the Fouce interests sued SICC, Anselmo and other defendants in 1976, charging "self-dealing, mismanagement, waste, and breach of fiduciary duty". This long-running suit joined with a separate legal problem—a push by a confederation of Spanish-language radio station owners alleging Azcárraga exercised control over SICC, resulting in impermissible foreign ownership of its stations. In 1985, FCC staff recommended that the licenses of the SICC stations not be renewed, a decision adopted by a commission administrative law judge as settlement talks began in the long-running Fouce suit. In May 1986, in a breakthrough in the Fouce case, the parties agreed to sell KMEX and the four-other stations directly owned by SICC. The FCC agreed to renew the stations' licenses in 1987 as part of the sale of SIN—then being renamed Univision—to Hallmark Cards and First Chicago Ventures.

At the same time as SICC's ownership drama played out, the Los Angeles Spanish-language television market transformed. For more than two decades, KMEX-TV was the only full-time Spanish-language TV station, though other stations aired some programming or had a partial-day Spanish format, such as KSCI and KBSC-TV. This changed in late 1985, when KBSC-TV was sold to Saul Steinberg-backed Reliance Capital and relaunched as KVEA, a key moment in the formation of Telemundo in early 1987. The management of the new full-time competitor felt that there was enough of a market for both stations to coexist, which was borne out by audience surveys in the wake of the launch of KVEA. However, its 22-year head start gave the station an extraordinarily high level of community identification; Villanueva noted that many people saw it as "our Channel 34".

The restructured Univision had a strong presence in Miami, and conflicts between Cuban Americans at the network level and KMEX's largely Mexican audience in Southern California bred internal concerns. In 1989, channel 34 employees sent a letter to the network asking that the station's news director vacancy be filled by someone "who reflects the interests ... experience and culture of the Los Angeles TV audience". One consultant noted that under Villanueva, who had recently left as general manager, the station made money but did little to reinvest in its news product compared to Miami's WLTV. That same year, another future leader in Spanish-language broadcasting left the station: Walter Ulloa, founder of Entravision Communications, who had worked as an editorial writer, sales manager and news director at channel 34 before leaving in 1989 to start Entravision.

Despite the increased competition from KVEA and other stations, KMEX maintained its lead and continued to grow. By 1990, it accounted for nearly 10 percent of all of the advertising revenue of Hispanic television, radio, and print media in the United States. It moved twice in ten years, first in 1992 and then to a facility in the Howard Hughes Center in 2002. However, even in the early 2000s, station revenues lagged its share of total ratings, common for the time among Spanish-language TV stations. With Univision's acquisition of the USA Broadcasting stations in January 2002, KMEX became part of a duopoly with KHSC-TV (channel 46), which became KFTR when Univision used the stations to launch the Telefutura network (now UniMás).

== Local programming ==
=== News operation ===
I say, if we can effect change (one way or the other), in our opinion, that's our journalism. That places the burden on us of determining what's good or not good for our community. We think we are in a position to make that determination.

— Danny Villanueva, on the "advocacy journalism" practiced at KMEX-TV in 1978

From the moment Villanueva became channel 34's news director in 1968, KMEX adopted a policy that generally has set the tone for Spanish-language television news in the United States, that of "advocacy journalism". Villanueva was succeeded by Ruben Salazar, a former writer for the Los Angeles Times, in January 1970. General manager Rank managed to outbid the Times for his services, believing that Salazar would complement what Villanueva had started. That August, Salazar was killed by riot police. A documentary on Salazar's death, Peace... on Our Time: KMEX-TV and the Death of Ruben Salazar, won a Peabody Award for TV public service programming. However, the station was also criticized by Chicano activists for moving quickly to shift away from the movement within days of Salazar's death; even an anonymous journalist told Hunter S. Thompson in his 1971 Rolling Stone article "Strange Rumblings in Aztlan", "[W]ithin 24 hours after Ruben was murdered, [Danny] Villanueva started tearing up the news department. Now he's trying to ... cut the balls off the news and turn KMEX-TV back into a safe Tio Taco station." In its early years, KMEX-TV news was a small operation: in 1978, the station had two camera and reporter crews covering the Los Angeles area, and its newscasts primarily depended on material from United Press International and the local City News Service wire with less local news coverage than station management would have liked. The newsroom was in a converted house across the street from the studios.

KMEX news became known for long-tenured personalities in the market and as a launching pad for correspondents with network careers. The Los Angeles Times described Eduardo Quezada, who anchored the news on channel 34 for 28 years, as an "institution"; he left for KVEA in 2003. María Elena Salinas worked for KMEX from 1981 to 1987 before becoming a national news anchor, a position in which she would remain for three decades. Jorge Ramos got his first job in American broadcasting at KMEX and was tapped to host a morning show; a network executive in town saw the show one day and invited Ramos to Miami to start a national morning show, which soon led to him hosting national news for the network.

We had to run across the street from our newsroom, dodging cars on Melrose Avenue, to the studio to do the news.

— María Elena Salinas, who joined the KMEX news staff in 1981

By 1990, KMEX began to beat the English-language news outlets in certain demographics in news ratings, first 18–34 and then 18–34, 18–49 and 25–54 by 1996. The latter accomplishment led to coverage from channel 34's English-language competitors. By 2005, what had been an achievement had become routine: a 2005 Univision press release trumpeted twelve straight years of ratings wins in the 18–34 and 18–49 segments for KMEX's 6 pm news.

After a two-decade absence from morning news—having canceled a previous effort in the late 1970s to air network programming—KMEX returned to airing morning news with an hour-long program, Primera Edición, in January 1999. This was the first hour-long morning newscast produced by a Spanish-language TV station in the United States. After just a year, the program was expanded to two hours, and the Univision stations in Miami and New York had followed suit and started their own morning newscasts.

The 2000s brought increased national recognition of KMEX's work. In 2002, the Columbia Journalism Review graded the local newscasts in Los Angeles and gave KMEX the highest rating of any station in any language. A news feature, El 15% de los Estados Unidos, which reported about the impact of Latinos on the United States, won KMEX its second Peabody Award in 2005. In 2008, The Washington Post compared Southern California's English-language newscasts with KMEX's Spanish newscasts and concluded that "the sharpest coverage of state and local issues—government, politics, immigration, labor, economics, health care—is now found on Spanish-language TV", though it noted the criticism that KMEX's "advocacy journalism" style sometimes went a step too far on issues like immigration. News director Jorge Mettey, who led the KMEX-TV newsroom for five years, was fired in 2007 for allegedly breaching ethics policies; Mettey sued the next year and claimed that Univision executives had a hand in shaping news coverage with the goal of increasing advertising revenues.

An increased investment by local news at Telemundo in the 2010s gave channel 34 a challenge. For the first time since 1987, KVEA beat out KMEX among viewers 18–49 in 2014. In June 2015, KMEX reformatted its morning newscast as A Primera Hora in order to target a younger audience. In April 2017, Univision launched Edición Digital California, a midday newscast aired on all of its stations in California.

=== Sports programming ===
In 2016, Univision announced a three-year deal to broadcast Spanish-language Los Angeles Rams programming, including preseason games and studio programs; this was the first time that Univision had ever entered into a media rights deal involving the National Football League. Programming aired on KMEX and KFTR and in the Bakersfield area on KABE-CD and KBTF-CD. In the last year of the agreement, only KFTR aired games.

=== Notable former on-air staff ===
- León Krauze – news anchor, 2012–2022
- Raul Peimbert – weeknight anchor, 2005–2011
- Jorge Ramos – reporter and host of Mundo Latino
- María Elena Salinas – news anchor and reporter, 1981–1987

== Technical information ==
=== Subchannels ===
KMEX broadcasts six subchannels of programming, including the main Univision feed, from its transmitter atop Mount Wilson.

Subchannels of KMEX-DT
Subchannel	Res.	Short name	Programming
34.1	720p	KMEX-DT	Univision
34.2	480i	UNM-HD	UniMás (KFTR-DT) in SD
34.3	480i	MVSGLD	MovieSphere Gold
34.4	480i	CRIME	True Crime Network
34.5	480i	STVUSA	Super TV (Mandarin) (4:3)
34.6	480i	BT2	Infomercials

Simulcast of subchannels of another station

=== Analog-to-digital conversion ===
KMEX-TV shut down its analog signal, over UHF channel 34, at 11:59 p.m. on June 12, 2009, as part of the federally mandated transition from analog to digital television. The station's digital signal relocated from its pre-transition UHF channel 35 to channel 34.

=== Translator ===
KMEX-DT is rebroadcast on the following translator station:

- Ridgecrest: K17HY-D

== Bibliography ==
- González, Arturo Ramón (1978). Case Study of KMEX-TV (MA). California State University, Northridge.
