= GTCR =

American private equity firm

GTCR LLC

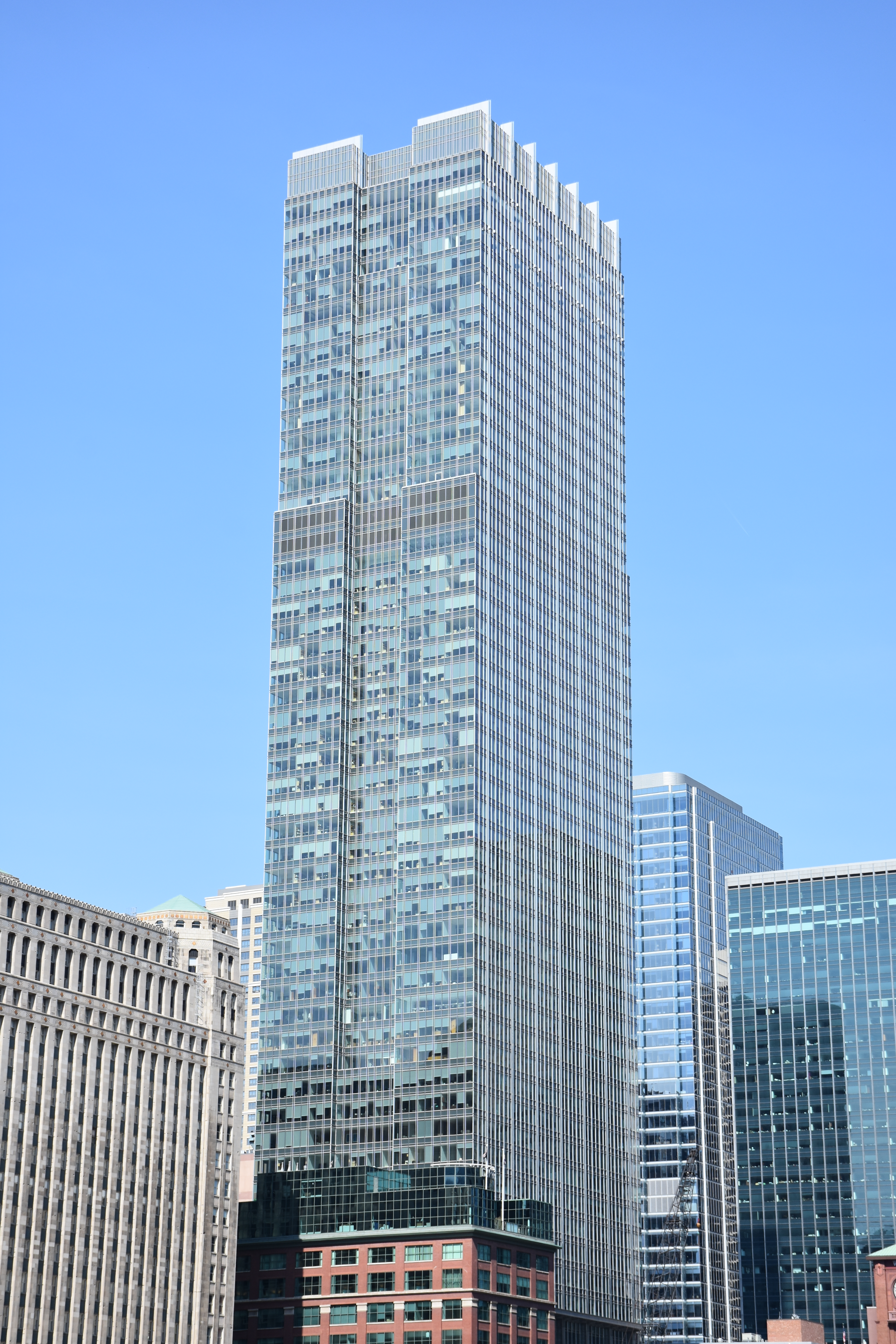
- Headquarters at 300 North LaSalle in Chicago
- Type: Private
- Industry: Private equity
- Founded: 1980; 46 years ago
- Founders: Stanley Golder; Carl Thoma; Bryan Cressey; Bruce Rauner
- Headquarters: 300 North LaSalle; Chicago, Illinois, United States
- Products: Leveraged buyout, Rollup
- AUM: US$40 billion (2024)
- Number of employees: 154 (2023)
- Website: gtcr.com

GTCR LLC is an American private equity firm focused on leveraged buyout, leveraged recapitalization, growth capital, and rollup transactions. The firm principally invests in high-growth industries, including financial services and technology, healthcare, information services and technology, and growth business services.

Since 1980, GTCR has reportedly invested more than $30 billion in over 290 companies and manages approximately $50 billion in equity capital. As of 2021, the firm has more than 80 employees, including over 40 investment professionals.

== History ==
GTCR logo in use prior to 1998 separation

The company was founded in 1980 as Golder Thoma & Co. by Stanley Golder, Carl Thoma, and Bryan Cressey. In the 1970s, Golder built the private equity program at First Chicago Corp., where he is noted primarily for backing Federal Express and for efforts as chairman of the National Venture Capital Association and the National Association of Small Business Investment Companies to change federal laws allowing pensions to invest in private equity. Golder, Thoma, and Cressey received much of its initial funding from William M. Blair. Upon leaving First Chicago, Golder was replaced by John A. Canning Jr., who would go on to found rival Chicago private equity firm Madison Dearborn.

The firm became Golder Thoma & Cressey in 1984, and with the promotion of Bruce Rauner to partner the firm would come to be known as Golder, Thoma, Cressey, Rauner, Inc. (GTCR), although it would still often be referred to as Golder Thoma.

In 1993, Golder retired as a partner, but he remained as a consultant to the business.

By the late 1990s, GTCR had made a name for itself by orchestrating "roll-ups" in such divergent markets as funeral homes, wireless paging, and coin-operated laundries. Roll-ups typically involved multiple acquisitions of smaller, similar companies in a particular industry.

In July 1998, the company inked a $100 million venture capital deal with AppNet Systems Inc., an electronic commerce start-up.

In 1998, disagreements between the senior partners led Golder, Thoma, Cressey, Rauner, Inc. to split into two private equity firms. Both firms continue to invest primarily through consolidations of specific industries, referred to as roll-ups:

- GTCR Golder Rauner, (Stanley Golder and Bruce Rauner), the private equity firm, based in Chicago, now known as GTCR. GTCR founder Stanley Golder died in 2000 and lead partner Bruce Rauner retired in 2012. Today, the firm is led by several senior partners, including Collin Roche, Dean Mihas, Craig Bondy, and David Donnini.
- Thoma Cressey, (Carl Thoma and Bryan Cressey) based in Chicago and San Francisco. Thoma Cressey would be renamed Thoma Cressey Bravo to reflect the growing role of partner Orlando Bravo. In 2008, Bryan Cressey left Thoma Cressey Bravo with several investment professionals to form Cressey & Co. a healthcare-focused private equity firm. Thoma Cressey Bravo became Thoma Bravo after Cressey's departure, led by managing partners Carl Thoma, Orlando Bravo, Lee Mitchell and Scott Crabill. The firm closed its 9th fund in March 2009 with $822.5 million.

=== Investment funds ===
GTCR invests through a series of private limited partnerships, and its investors include a variety of pension funds (e.g., Washington State Investment Board, Pennsylvania State Employee's Retirement System) endowments, and other institutional investors.

Following its separation from Thoma Cressey (discussed above), GTCR has raised the following private equity funds:

- 1998 - Fund VI, ($870 million)
- 2000 - Fund VII ($2.0 billion)
- 2003 - Fund VIII ($1.8 billion)
- 2006 - Fund IX ($2.75 billion)
- 2011 - Fund X ($3.25 billion)
- 2014 - Fund XI ($3.85 billion)
- 2017 - Fund XII ($5.25 billion)
- 2020 - Fund XIII ($7.5 billion)
- 2023 - Fund XIV ($11.5 billion)

=== Acquisitions ===
In January 2002, GTCR acquired the Transaction Solutions subsidiary of PSINet Inc., which would revert to its former name, Transaction Network Services (TNS), upon completion of the transaction. The purchase price was $285 million.

In February 2002, GTCR acquired information technology company Syniverse. This would be GTCr's fourth transaction in that sector. Syniverse would be sold to a financial buyer in 2010 for $2.6 billion.

In July 2002, GTCR entered into an agreement to recapitalize VeriFone Inc., a provider of secure electronic payment solutions.

In 2010, GTCR acquired Protection One in a $828 million deal.

In August 2011, GTCR acquired Global Traffic Network, a traffic and news reports provider for radio and television stations outside the U.S., in a deal valued at $267 million.

In 2017, GTCR acquired Paya Holdings, Inc., an integrated payment provider. Years later, in January 2023, Canadian fintech company Nuvei Corporation would acquire Paya from GTCR in an all-cash transaction through a tender offer with a total enterprise value of about $1.3 billion.

In Jun 2017, GTCR announced it would acquire GreatCall (now Lively), a provider of PERS and cellular devices for seniors.

In June 2020, GTCR took a 25% stake in Raleigh, North Carolina-based Captrust Financial Advisors. The investment reflected a $1.25 billion valuation of Captrust.

In November 2020, GTCR announced it was buying a majority stake in Jet Support Services, Inc. (JSSI).

In August 2023, it was announced GTCR had acquired the Basingstoke and Paris-headquartered compliance and supply chain management software platform, Once For All, from Warburg Pincus for an undisclosed amount.

In September 2023, it was announced GTCR had acquired the Fairfield, Connecticut-based foundation software provider for private foundations and charitable advisors, Foundation Source.

In October 2023, GTCR acquired the commercial security, fire, and life safety business unit of ADT Inc. for $1.6 billion. In December, GTCR acquired Cloudbreak Health from UpHealth for $180 million.

In April 2024, GTCR announced plans to acquire wealth management platform AssetMark for $2.7 billion, aiming to privatize the platform more than five years after its debut on the public market.

In November 2024, GTCR invested $1.33 billion in Austin, Texas-based software quality testing company Tricentis. GTCR would gain equal representation on the board of directors with Tricentis' majority shareholder, software investor Insight Partners.

In December 2024, GTCR sold insurance broker AssuredPartners to Arthur J. Gallagher & Co. for $13.45 billion. GTCR had backed AssuredPartners' creation in 2011. In 2015, GTCR had sold a majority stake to London-based private equity firm Apax Partners, before reacquiring a majority stake through a 2019 recapitalization.

In January 2025, GTCR and digital services investor Recognize acquired Tranzact, a direct-to-consumer insurance services company, from Willis Towers Watson (WTW) for $632.4 million.

In April 2025, it was announced that GTCR and Fidelity National Information Services (FIS) were selling Cincinnati-based payment processing firm Worldpay to Global Payments for $24.25 billion, and was expected to close in the first half of 2026. GTCR had bought a 55% stake in Worldpay from FIS at an $18.5 billion valuation in July 2023.

In May 2025, GTCR agreed to purchase British insurance broker JMG Group, one of the United Kingdom's 30 largest insurance brokers since its founding in 2020, alongside current investor Synova.

On September 11, 2025, GTCR announced a deal to acquire Zentiva from Advent International in a €4.1 billion deal. On September 15, GTCR announced a deal to acquire Simplisafe from Hellman & Friedman in a transaction said to exceed $2.5B

In March 2026, GTCR formed a youth sports subsidiary called Ascent Sports Group, which would be led by CEO Gary Swidler, a former C-suite executive at the Match Group. In April 2026, GTCR closed a $400-million deal for Montreal amateur sports streamer LiveBarn.
