= KFTR-DT =

Television station in Ontario, California

- Ontario–Los Angeles, California; United States
- City: Ontario, California (Note: Originally licensed to Guasti, California; moved to Ontario in 1984.)
- Channels: Digital: 29 (UHF); Virtual: 46
- Branding: UniMás Los Ángeles

Programming
- Affiliations: 46.1: UniMás; for others, see § Subchannels

Ownership
- Owner: TelevisaUnivision; (UniMas Los Angeles LLC)
- Sister stations: KLVE, KMEX-DT, KLXM/KLXO, KSCA

History
- First air date: First incarnation: August 16, 1972; Second incarnation: April 21, 1984
- Last air date: First incarnation: April 1977
- Former call signs: KBSA (1972–1977); KIHS-TV (1984–1987); KHSC (1987–1992); KHSC-TV (1992–2001); KFTR (2001–2003); KFTR-TV (2004–2009)
- Former channel number: Analog: 46 (UHF, 1972–2009)
- Former affiliations: Independent (1972–1973, 1974-1977, 1984–1986); TBN (1973–1974); Dark (February–June 1973, 1977–1984); HSN (1986–2002)
- Call sign meaning: Telefutura (former name for UniMás)

Technical information
- Licensing authority: FCC
- Facility ID: 60549
- ERP: 370 kW
- HAAT: 956 m (3,136 ft)
- Transmitter coordinates: 34°13′36.1″N 118°4′2.3″W
- Translator(s): KMEX-DT 34.2 (UHF) Los Angeles; K15HJ-D Ridgecrest

Links
- Public license information: Public file; LMS
- Website: UniMás

KFTR-DT (channel 46) is a television station licensed to Ontario, California, United States, serving the Los Angeles area. It is the West Coast flagship station of the Spanish-language network UniMás, owned and operated by TelevisaUnivision. Under common ownership with Univision station KMEX-DT (channel 34), the two stations share studios on Center Drive (near I-405) in Westchester; KFTR-DT's transmitter is located atop Mount Wilson. KFTR does not air any local newscasts of its own; however, the station does cross-promote sister station KMEX's local news programs.

== History ==
=== KBSA ===
On December 18, 1962, Broadcasting Service of America filed an application for a construction permit to build a new TV station on channel 40 licensed to Guasti. The application was amended to specify channel 46 prior to being approved by the Federal Communications Commission (FCC) on October 14, 1964. The permit took the call letters KBSA, for its ownership. William A. Myers, the principal of Broadcasting Service of America, was noted as concerned by the lack of local programming on television in a 1965 report on KBSA being authorized to locate atop Mount Wilson. With little fanfare, channel 46 finally signed on August 16, 1972, five days after the FCC granted KBSA program test authority; it primarily broadcast in Spanish. However, it then went silent from February 8 to June 7, 1973. Paul Crouch and Jim Bakker purchased time on the station to launch their television ministry, known as the Trinity Broadcasting Network, for which KBSA served as the network's original home.

A year later, KBSA was sold, first in a minority stake and then entirely, to the Berean Baptist Church; TBN would buy KLXA (channel 40) in Fontana and eventually renamed that station KTBN. Berean announced plans to telecast its own services over channel 46. Another program on channel 46 in 1974 was a legal review show, three nights a week, for students preparing for state bar examinations. In addition to programming from Berean, other churches aired regular programs on KBSA, including the First Christian Church of San Pedro. Together with KHOF-TV and KLXA, KBSA was the third religious TV station in southern California.

Berean entered into financial difficulties not long after acquiring channel 46, which escalated into a disagreement with Broadcasting Service of America. In an evident default, the KBSA transmission equipment was slated for public sale in August 1976. The station went silent in April 1977. The month before, Broadcasting Service of America entered into an agreement to sell the license for $1.8 million to Buena Vista Broadcasting Company, majority owned by Leon Crosby, who owned KEMO television in San Francisco. Three months later, however, Berean announced it had sold the station to a different concern: Metropolitan Broadcasting Company, owned by Robert F. Beauchamp, in a proposed $1.55 million transaction. The Buena Vista application was dismissed in 1978.

Despite the silence, channel 46 would soon enter into a fight for its life. On March 15, 1979, the FCC designated KBSA's application to renew its license for hearing. The move was made after the commission alleged that the station had broadcast false information about bond sales, diverted station operating funds, and carried out an unauthorized transfer of control. Bondholders and other creditors of KBSA were owed a collective $1.5 million by a station that had no assets or equipment—not even a telephone. A $2.2 million distress sale to a minority-owned group, Hispanic Broadcasters, Inc., was approved in March 1980. The next year, Hispanic Broadcasters and Leon Crosby—whose Buena Vista bid had been dismissed three years prior—sold the channel 46 license for $3.7 million to HBI Acquisition, also Hispanic-owned.

=== Catholic KIHS-TV ===
In preparation for returning to the air, on November 28, 1983, the call letters were changed to KIHS-TV; the seven-year silence was broken on April 21, 1984—the day before Easter Sunday. The "IHS" call letters referred to the Latin Christogram. With the De Rance Foundation, a large Catholic charity, as one of the stockholders in HBI Acquisition, channel 46's new programming was predominantly Catholic, with family movies and general entertainment shows filling out the schedule; the flagship program was a three-hour news magazine known as Heart of the Nation.

KIHS-TV initially broadcast 24 hours a day until cutting back to 18 hours in February 1985. Later in the year, it increased its secular output and began broadcasting more commercials, citing a need to improve its finances. Further secularization was to come in the fall of 1986 when channel 46 picked up the Independent Network News syndicated national newscast, a syndicated package of college football from service academies, movies and home shopping under the name "Shopping Line". Harry G. John, a major philanthropist involved with De Rance, had been dismissed after mismanagement of the foundation by spending millions on the television operations.

=== Home shopping as KHSC ===
In September 1986, the Home Shopping Network (HSN) acquired KIHS-TV for $35 million, putting an end to De Rance's plans to expand its Catholic programming nationwide. Heart of the Nation had shrunk to a 30-minute talk show and moved to KDOC on December 1, 1986, as channel 46 prepared to go to full-time home shopping, a switch that was made on December 8. Upon the closing of the HSN acquisition in January 1987, channel 46 was renamed KHSC, for the Home Shopping Club service. The new HSC outlet was the second most-successful of HSN's broadcast stations in sales volume in 1988, only trailing its stations in New York. In addition to home shopping programming, half–hour weather reports, public service announcements, and the public affairs program In Your Interests were added to fulfill local programming.

=== Sale to Univision ===
By 1998, after HSN bought the Universal Pictures TV assets from Seagram, Silver King Broadcasting became USA Broadcasting and plans were to switch all of its stations to a new general entertainment independent format known as "CityVision" featuring both locally-produced programming and live sports along with syndicated drama and sitcom reruns, movies and syndicated cartoons. Stations in Miami (as "WAMI 69"), Boston (as WHUB "Hub 66"), Atlanta (as WHOT-TV "Hotlanta 34"), and Dallas–Fort Worth (as "K-Star 49") had all switched to the format. Plans were for KHSC to become "Click 46" as KLIK. The Walt Disney Company was the leading candidate to buy the stations, which would have made channel 46 a sister to ABC's flagship KABC-TV. However, Univision Communications outbid Disney and in January 2002 used channel 46 (whose call letters were changed to KFTR-TV) and all but three of USAB's stations to become the nucleus for its new second network TeleFutura (now known as UniMás).

== Programming ==
KFTR previously aired a one-hour extension of KMEX's weekday morning newscast at 7 a.m. This was later replaced with an entertainment program named Lanzaté. In addition, KFTR may also take on the responsibility of KMEX's newscasts in the event KMEX is unable due to special programming on Univision. One instance occurred during Univision's coverage of the 2014 FIFA World Cup, when KFTR aired KMEX's weekday morning newscasts while KMEX was airing a live broadcast of Despierta America. Another instance occurs every December, when KFTR airs KMEX's evening newscasts during Univision's coverage of Teletón USA.

=== Los Angeles Rams ===
In 2016, Univision announced a three-year deal to broadcast Spanish-language Los Angeles Rams programming, including preseason games and studio programs; this was the first time that Univision had ever entered into a media rights deal involving the National Football League. Programming aired on KMEX and KFTR and in the Bakersfield area on KABE-CD and KBTF-CD. In the last year of the agreement, only KFTR aired games.

=== Los Angeles FC ===
In April 2018, Univision Los Angeles announced an exclusive programming partnership with Los Angeles FC, a Major League Soccer club, becoming the official Spanish-language broadcaster. The deal included 18 regular season games and pre- and post-game shows on KFTR. The relationship ended after two years when these rights passed to Estrella TV/KRCA.

== Technical information ==
=== Subchannels ===
The station's signal is multiplexed:

Subchannels of KFTR-DT
Subchannel	Res.	Short name	Programming
46.1	720p	KFTR-DT	UniMás
46.2	480i	GREAT	Great (4:3)
46.3	480i	MYSTERY	Ion Mystery
46.4	480i	GRIT	Grit
46.5	480i	Quest	Quest
46.6	480i	ShopLC	Shop LC

In January 2010, KFTR upgraded its digital signal to transmit network programming in HD, as part of a company-wide upgrade of Univision's stations to allow high definition broadcasts. On December 5, 2010, sister station KMEX-DT began Mobile DTV broadcasts of its own signal and of KFTR-DT. KMEX-DT has two Mobile DTV feeds, one of subchannel 34.1, labelled "KMEX-MH1", and of sister station KFTR-TV 46.1, labelled "KFTR-MH2", broadcasting at 3.67 Mbit/s. It was the highest bitrate of any Los Angeles television station's mobile feed. In addition, the station is also simulcast over KMEX's second digital subchannel.

=== Translator ===
- K15HJ-D Ridgecrest

=== Analog-to-digital conversion ===
KFTR-TV shut down its analog signal, over UHF channel 46, on June 12, 2009, as part of the federally mandated transition from analog to digital television. The station's digital signal remained on its pre-transition UHF channel 29, using virtual channel 46.
