= AlterAg =

American agriculture company

- Company type: Private
- Industry: Agriculture, dairy farming
- Founded: 2014; 12 years ago Delaware
- Founders: Multiple
- Headquarters: Hayward, Wisconsin, United States
- Key people: Ron Braatz (President and CEO)
- Products: Milk, beef, international trade, food distribution
- Number of employees: ▲80 (2020)
- Website: www.alterag.com

AlterAg Industries Corporation is a dairy farming industry holding company that also produces beef and utilizes vertical integration. The company's current incarnation can be traced back to 2014 when as Halydean Corporation it was incorporated in Delaware. It is headquartered in Hayward, Wisconsin in the United States, but primarily consists of holdings in subsidiaries. The company, a classic rollup, targets dairy facilities for mergers and acquisitions.

The company's CEO is Ron Braatz. AlterAg is an agricultural land holding company that specializes in dairy and beef production. The company invests in the dairy industry. The following SIC codes may apply to AlterAg: 02410000 Dairy farms, 02120000 Beef cattle (except feedlots), 42120102 Farm to market haulage (local), and 51430000 Wholesale Trade - Nondurable Goods Dairy products, except dried or canned. Subsidiaries include trucking / milk hauling, farm land, dairy operations, heifer replacement breeding, academic research, and beef cow breeding using artificial insemination with sexed semen for F1 hybrid crosses.
