= KLXM =

Spanish-language radio station in West Covina, California, United States

KLXM and KLXO

KLXM: Inglewood, California; KLXO: West Covina, California; United States
- Broadcast area: Los Angeles County; Inland Empire; Orange County
- Frequencies: KLXM: 103.9 MHz (HD Radio); KLXO: 98.3 MHz (HD Radio)
- Branding: Latino Mix 103.9 y 98.3

Programming
- Language(s): Spanish
- Format: Contemporary hit radio
- Affiliations: Los Angeles Chargers Spanish Radio Network

Ownership
- Owner: Uforia Audio Network; (Univision Radio Los Angeles Ltd.)
- Sister stations: KLVE, KSCA, KMEX-DT, KFTR-DT

History
- First air date: KLXM: February 14, 1958; KLXO: November 18, 1957
- Former call signs: KLXM: KTYM-FM (1958–1973); KAGB-FM (1973–1976); KACE (1976–2000); KRCD (2000–2026); KLXO: KDRC (1957–1962); KBOB-FM (1962–1993); KMNA (1993); KBOB (1993); KMQA (1993–1996); KRTO (1996–2000); KRCV (2000–2026)
- Call sign meaning: From "Latino Mix"

Technical information
- Licensing authority: FCC
- Facility ID: KLXM: 1025; KLXO: 19088
- Class: KLXM: A; KLXO: A
- ERP: KLXM: 4,100 watts; KLXO: 6,000 watts
- HAAT: KLXM: 118 meters (387 ft); KLXO: 91 meters (299 ft)
- Transmitter coordinates: KLXM: 34°0′26″N 118°21′54″W; KLXO: 34°4′18″N 117°48′46″W

Links
- Public license information: KLXM: Public file; LMS; KLXO: Public file; LMS
- Webcast: Listen live (via iHeartRadio)
- Website: univision.com/radio/los-angeles-klxm-fm/

KLXM (103.9 FM) is a commercial radio station licensed to Inglewood, California, and broadcasting to Los Angeles County and parts of Orange County; it is simulcast full-time with KLXO (98.3 FM) licensed to West Covina, California, and broadcasting to the Inland Empire and parts of Orange County. Both stations simulcast a Spanish-language contemporary hit radio format branded as "Latino Mix 103.9 & 98.3". The stations are owned by the Uforia Audio Network subsidiary of TelevisaUnivision.

The stations have studios at the Univision Los Angeles Broadcast Center located on Center Drive (near I-405) in the Westchester area of Los Angeles; KLXM’s transmitter is at a site in the Kenneth Hahn State Recreation Area in the Baldwin Hills and KLXO’s transmitter is off Via Blanca in San Dimas near California State Route 57 (The Orange Freeway).

== History of 103.9 ==
=== KTYM-FM ===
On February 14, 1958, the station signed on as KTYM-FM. In its early days, 103.9 mostly simulcast co-owned KTYM (AM 1460), and both stations were owned by Al J. Williams. Because KTYM was then a daytimer, required to be off the air at night, programming continued in the evening on KTYM-FM.

In 1961, KTYM-FM began targeting Los Angeles' African-American community at night with R&B and soul music. The first black Operations Manager on Los Angeles FM radio was Charles (Chuck) Johnson and Lonnie Cook was the first African-American program director on an FM station. KTYM-FM carried the AM station's programming by day, then from sunset to midnight, the station aired black programming. Johnson had been a popular disc jockey at KPRS in Kansas City, and Cook was also from Kansas City.

The format included R&B, Doo Wop, and Blues. Floyd Ray, the owner of the first black Los Angeles record distributor and former big band leader, hosted one of the shows. Ron Johnson was the lone white DJ. At midnight, just before sign-off, the station played "Sugarloaf at Twilight" by Ahmad Jamal, Lonnie Cook doubled as a station engineer. Many future celebrities made their debuts on the station including a police officer who would soon be the Mayor of Los Angeles, Tom Bradley. LaMonte McLemore was a member of The Intervals (the Doo Wop group that represented the station at promotional functions) and was the station photographer. He was the photographer of the center page models in Jet magazine and later was one of The 5th Dimension.

KTYM-FM was noted for its independent approach to programming, and many times refused to air the designated "A" side of a record. It even played tunes like "Your Old Lady" by The Isley Brothers which had been banned from airplay in 1961. Cook featured the Doo Wop "B" side "Write to Me". AM 1230 KGFJ's Larry McCormick (brother to lead singer Charles from Bloodstone) heard the station making noise and getting attention with "Your Old Lady" and added it to his playlist and to his televised dance show. When Atlantic Records got calls for the 45 rpm record, the record label put it back on the market, earning a new hit song.

=== KAGB-FM and KACE ===
In 1973, Clarence Avant's Avant Garde Broadcasting acquired KTYM-FM and changed the call letters to KAGB-FM. For the next 28 years, 103.9 FM, which became KACE in 1976, played urban contemporary music. It became one of the premier stations for African American listeners in the Los Angeles area. In 1977, after Avant Gardé was put into receivership, All Pro Broadcasting, owned by former Green Bay Packers defensive end Willie Davis and his wife Ann, acquired the newly renamed KACE. Some of the air personalities included Steve Woods, Lawrence Tanter, Pam Wells, Lisa Lipps, Ken Taylor, Hamilton Cloud, E.Z. Wiggins, Karla with a K, Mark Gunne, Antoinette Russell, Tommy T. (Thomas Turner) with Mike Mann, and Rico Reedie, along with news and public affairs personalities that included Ron Dungee, Sam Putineye, Mark Whitelocke, Isidra Person-Lynnie and Kevin A. Ross.

For a three-year period, between 1988 and 1990, the station featured nightclub-formatted music mix shows for six days a week, with Southern California club DJ Elvin Bridges. In addition to being an on-air personality, Bridges created and produced his own weekday music mix show that aired during the afternoon rush hour he coined "Bumper To Bumper - In The Mix with Elvin Bridges", plus a weekly three-hour Saturday night party music mix show. "Let's Talk", "Speak Out", "Sunday Morning Live" and "The People's Connection" were popular community affairs talk shows. Production director Mark Drummond was also assistant program director during the Cox ownership years, and later worked on the production staffs at KFI.

KACE experimented with a hip-hop format in 1993 as "The People's Station, The New V103.9". Because KACE was powered at only 3,000 watts, it added an Inland Empire simulcast, KAEV, which also broadcast at 103.9 FM (now KHTI). However, the hip hop music was scaled back in October of that same year; Davis' company, responding to the political and social backlash against hip hop, announced a prohibition of the words "bitch," "ho," and "nigger" on air, and shifted to a "Positive Urban" format. However, this lowered ratings significantly. Davis flipped KACE to urban oldies and ended the simulcast with KAEV, switching it to modern rock as KCXX. (Another local station, KPWR, also banned the words, but did not change its rhythmic contemporary format.)

In 1994, KACE was sold to Cox Radio for $11.3 million. Cox was then also the owner of KFI and KOST.

== History of 98.3 ==
On November 18, 1957, KDRC went on the air. It was owned by Pacific South Broadcasting with J. Kent Blanché and J. David Worthy as the principals. The studios were at 1415 West Garvey Avenue.

In 1962, KDRC became KBOB, airing an easy listening format. By 1965, KBOB became co-owned with daytimer KGRB (900 AM) in West Covina. Owner Robert Burdette ran a daytime simulcast based on a Big Bands format, featuring a somewhat small-market sound, for over twenty years. KBOB continued the format daily until midnight. Burdette also leased KBOB to the University of LaVerne for a while in the early 1980s. ULV ran the same Big Band format (but not simulcast) during daylight hours, using students and other volunteers as DJs. After Burdette's death, it became a dance music station. In 1993, it switched to Spanish contemporary music as KMQA, "La Maquina". The station was powered at only 2,300 watts, targeting the San Gabriel Valley. The station was sold to San Gabriel Valley Radio Communications Corporation Ltd. for $3.2 million.

San Gabriel Valley Radio Communications Corporation switched 98.3 to a unique rock en español format, becoming KRTO "Ritmo 98.3". Shortly after Cox Radio bought KACE, it added KRTO to give KACE's programming better coverage in the eastern suburbs of Los Angeles. Cox paid $19 million for the 98.3 signal.

== Simulcast ==
In 1997, the two stations began simulcasting KACE's Urban AC format on two frequencies. During this time, iconic Soul DJ and broadcast engineer Johnny Morris hosted overnights, and veteran broadcaster George Moore hosted a weekly Saturday-night '70s show. In 1999, the stations added the nationally syndicated Tom Joyner Morning Show but ratings remained low.

In 2000, Cox decided to leave the Los Angeles radio market by trading KOST and KFI to AMFM (now part of iHeartMedia, Inc.) in exchange for several stations in Atlanta, where Cox is headquartered, while KACE/KRTO were sold to Hispanic Broadcasting Company (now part of Univision Communications through its Univision Radio subsidiary) for $75 million.

KRCD/KRCV logo as "Recuerdo" (2017 - 2026)

Once the sale was finalized, the stations flipped to a Spanish Classic hits format, branded as "Recuerdo" or in English, "Memory". KACE switched its call sign to KRCD while KRTO became KRCV; the final sign-off for the Urban format on both frequencies occurred on February 28, 2000. In recent years, the station has dropped most 60's and 70's music and is focused on the 80's to 2010. Both stations became affiliates of the Uforia Audio Network in 2019.

On July 31, Uforia registered several domains for the stations, and on August 1, they both began stunting with 5 songs on loop ("Mi Gente" by J Balvin, "Latina Foreva" by Karol G, "Pary" by Grupo Frontera, "Que Pasa" by Haus-A-Holics and "Rompe" by Daddy Yankee), effectively marking the end of the 26-year-old "Recuerdo" brand, as well as the end of the format itself, which would continue on the Uforia app as a streaming brand. On August 3, at 6:00 a.m., KRCD and KRCV both flipped to a Spanish-language contemporary hit radio format as "Latino Mix 103.9 y 98.3", joining similarly-branded stations in Chicago, Dallas, Houston, Phoenix and San Francisco (KVVF/KVVZ), as well as two other similarly-formatted stations in Miami and New York. Described as featuring "the biggest global rhythmic pop hits", Uforia applied to change both stations' call letters to KLXM and KLXO respectively, which are set to take effect on August 5. The former format went out with a 1.6 share in the June 2026 Nielsen books, tying with new competitor KXOL-FM; both stations share some of the same music.
