= List of Los Angeles Chargers broadcasters =

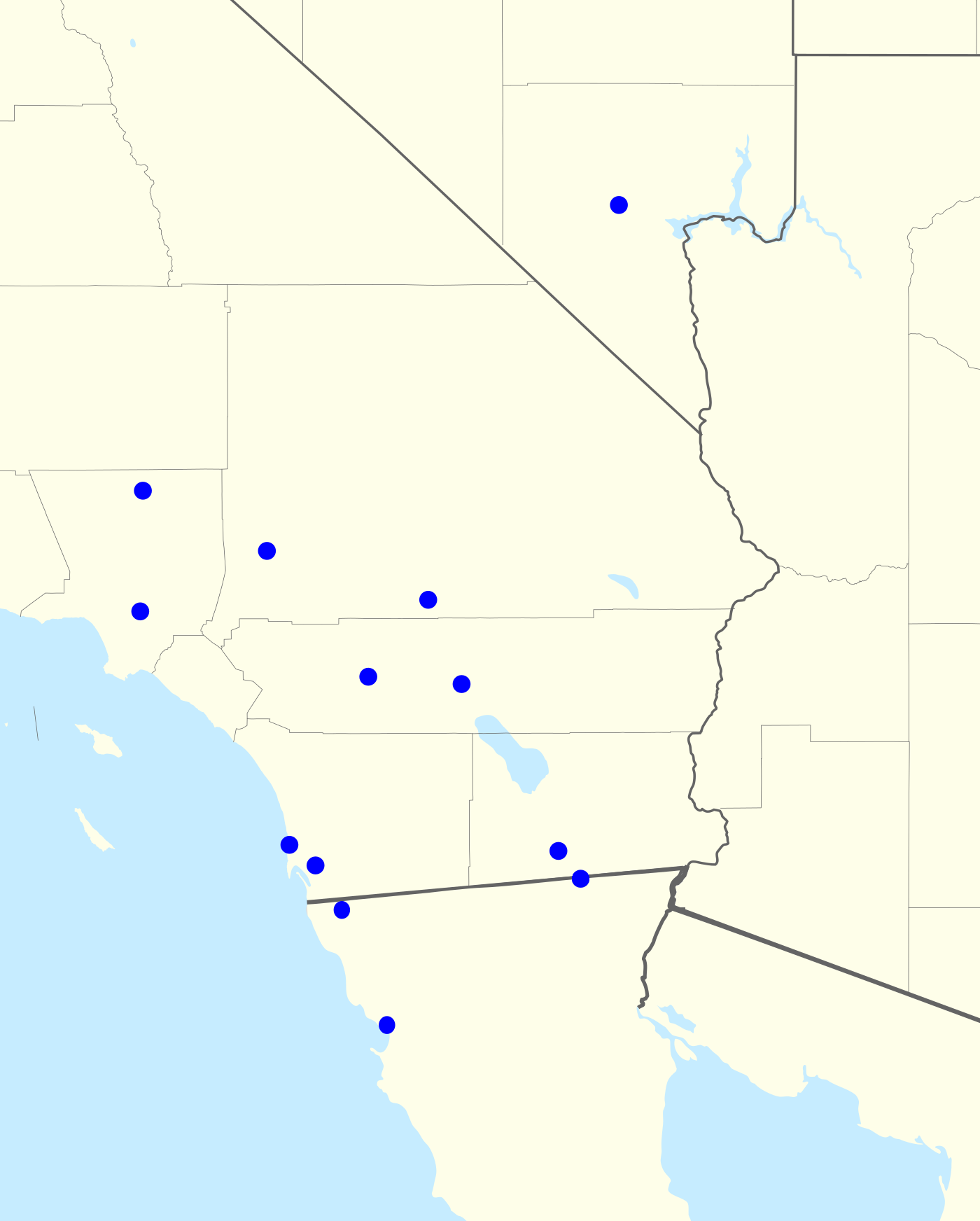
Map of radio affiliates

== Radio ==
The Chargers' official flagship radio station in Los Angeles is KYSR 98.7 FM, owned by iHeartMedia, Inc. For the previous two seasons, the radio flagship was iHeart talk station KFI 640 AM. Chargers daily updates and specialty shows air on another iHeart station, Fox Sports Radio KLAC 570 AM.

Fox Sports Radio host Matt "Money" Smith and former NFL scout Daniel Jeremiah comprise the broadcast team, with Shannon Farren serving as the sideline reporter. Past Chargers radio broadcasters have included Ralph Lawler, Josh Lewin, Stu Nahan, Tom Kelly, Lee "Hacksaw" Hamilton, Dan Rowe, Ted Leitner, Nick Hardwick and Hank Bauer. Bauer served seventeen seasons (1998–2014) as the radio color analyst. However, the Chargers and then-flagship station 105.3 KIOZ decided not to renew his contract. Bauer was replaced by Curtis Conway starting with the 2015 season.

=== P.A. announcer ===
Louie G, a local radio DJ and host for station KRRL, serves as the P.A. announcer of all Charger home games at SoFi Stadium. Previously, Eric Smith was the announcer. Smith replaced legendary P.A. announcer Bruce Binkowski, who went on to become the executive director of the Holiday Bowl and Poinsettia Bowl games. Smith is also the public address announcer of all Los Angeles Clippers basketball games and is a former Dodgers baseball games announcer.

With the Chargers return to Los Angeles in 2017, the team became a beneficiary of league scheduling policies. Both the Chargers and the Los Angeles Rams share the Los Angeles media market, the second largest in the United States. This means that the Chargers cannot play home games, road division games against the Denver Broncos or Oakland Raiders, or interconference road games against the NFC West (in seasons that the AFC West and NFC West meet in interconference play) in the early 10:00 a.m. Pacific time slot. In addition, they cannot play interconference home games at the same time or network as the Rams. As a result, both teams generally will have more limited scheduling options, and will also benefit by receiving more prime-time games than usual. Thus, regardless of the previous season's record, the Chargers will receive a disproportionate number of Sunday Night, Monday Night and/or Thursday Night games, compared to the rest of the league.

Previously when the team was in San Diego its main flagship was KIOZ. The previous Los Angeles flagship was KLAC/570, in Los Angeles and Orange County, which like KIOZ, KLSD, and several other Charger radio affiliates, is owned by iHeartMedia. Prior to that KSPN/710 was the Los Angeles affiliate and before that, KMPC/1540 for several years.

As of 2014, the Chargers also stream their radio broadcasts on their official mobile application (through iOS and Android devices) as well as on their website.

== Radio affiliates ==
Chargers Radio Network

=== English ===
City	Call Sign	Frequency
Los Angeles	KFI-AM	640 AM
Los Angeles	KLAC	570 AM (daily coverage, special programming & select game simulcasts with KYSR-FM that don't conflict with L.A. Dodgers and Clippers)
San Diego	KOGO	600 AM
Temecula, California/Inland Empire	KATY-FM	101.3 FM
Yucca Valley, California	KNWH	1250 AM
Coachella, California	KNWZ	970 AM
Palm Springs, California	KNWQ	1140 AM
Palmdale/Lancaster, California	KAVL	610 AM
Victorville/Hesperia, California	KMPS	910 AM
Imperial Valley	KXO-FM	107.5 FM

=== Spanish ===
City	Call Sign	Frequency
Greater Los Angeles Area	KSCA-HD3	101.9 FM-HD3
Los Angeles/Inglewood, California	KLXM	103.9 FM
Orange County, California	KLXM/KLXO	103.9 & 98.3 FM
Inland Empire	KLXO	98.3 FM
San Diego/Tijuana, Mexico	XEXX-AM	1420 AM
Mexicali, Mexico	XEHG	1370 AM
Ensenada, Mexico	XHEPF-FM	89.1 FM
