= Preventx =

English medical company

- Type: Private
- Industry: Health care; Health technology; Sexual health
- Founded: 2007
- Founders: Neil Cooper; Tim Alston
- Headquarters: Sheffield, United Kingdom
- Key people: Mark Driver (CEO); Dr Vanessa Apea (Medical director); Dr John White (Medical director)
- Products: Self-sampling diagnostic testing kits/services.
- Brands: Freetest.me; SH.UK; SHL.UK; Test.me
- Services: Medical laboratory; Molecular diagnostics; Medical microbiology
- Number of employees: 100+
- Website: www.preventx.com

Preventx is a provider of remote/self-sampling sexual health testing kits and routine and emergency contraception based in Meadowhall Business Park, Sheffield. Established in 2008, Preventx has completed over 10 million tests for infectious diseases now processing over 300,000 tests each month.

Preventx's first service, Freetest.me, launched on 1 November 2008 to support the UK's National Chlamydia Screening Programme. The service enabled local NHS Trusts to offer remote testing to 16-24 year olds (the target age group for the screening programme) as an alternative to accessing self-sampling kits from local stockists such as pharmacies.

The service enables users to place an order online, receive a sampling kit though the mail and return samples to a laboratory for testing. When the service first launched, samples were tested for Chlamydia however this has later been expanded to include tests for many more sexually transmitted infections such as HIV, syphilis and hepatitis.

Remote testing requires users to collect their own samples which very depending on the tests required. Common samples include a urine sample, vaginal swab and/or a capillary blood sample collected using a fingerprick lancet. While only a small blood sample is required (approx. 400μl), some people can find collecting this difficult.

The COVID-19 pandemic in the United Kingdom has increased use of remote health services, as people are more used to testing themselves at home. After March 2020 use rose by more than 200% as many sexual health service clinics closed. It was awarded a contract to provide at-home testing kits for 31 London boroughs, coordinated by Sexual Health London, until at least 2023 as in-person testing was restricted to people with symptoms. The firm supplies more than 60% of the local authorities in England and claims to be the world’s biggest publicly-funded STI testing service.

The firm discovered in a survey of 8,676 women that Trichomonas vaginalis was more common in women from ethnic minority backgrounds and they were also more likely to test positive when not displaying symptoms than white women.

The firm polled 500 women in 2021 who attempted to access long-acting contraceptive choices and found that 30% could not get a long-acting reversible contraceptive coil or an implant because of the disruption of sexual health clinics. This had sent them to abortion services, and the morning-after pill.

Synova is a substantial investor in the business.
