= Barry F. Sullivan =

- Born: December 21, 1930; New York, New York
- Died: August 11, 2016 (aged 85); Bronxville, New York
- Education: Georgetown University; Columbia University (BA); University of Chicago (MBA); Fordham University
- Occupations: Investment banker, government official
- Known for: chairman and CEO of First Chicago Corporation deputy mayor of New York City
- Spouse: Audrey Sullivan
- Children: 5

Barry F. Sullivan (December 21, 1930 – August 11, 2016) was an American investment banker and politician who was chairman and CEO of First Chicago Corporation from 1980 to 1991, and deputy mayor of New York City for finance and economic development under Mayor David Dinkins.

== Early life and education ==
Sullivan was born on December 21, 1930, in New York City and grew up in The Bronx. His father worked in the insurance business. He attended the Jesuit Regis High School, where he excelled in academics and athletics.

After graduating from Regis, Sullivan considered the priesthood and entered Georgetown University and was a high-scoring basketball player for the Georgetown Hoyas men's basketball team. In 1952, he enlisted in the U.S. Army and served in Korea. He finished college at Columbia University and graduated with a B.A. in history and languages in 1955.

== Career ==
Despite not having played competitive basketball in three years, he was approached by the New York Knicks and offered a contract upon his graduation from Columbia. However, he had a change of heart and moved to East Chicago, Indiana, where he worked for Inland Steel Company and attended the University of Chicago Booth School of Business, earning an MBA in 1957.

He landed a job at Chase Manhattan Bank in 1957 and was named a senior vice president in 1972, the youngest person ever to hold the position. He eventually became an executive vice president and a member of the bank's management committee.

In 1982, he was chosen from about 25 candidates to become the chairman and CEO of First Chicago Corporation, the holding company for First National Bank of Chicago, American National Corporation, First Chicago Community Bankcorp, FCC National bank, and Gary-Wheaton Corporation. During his 11 years at First Chicago, Sullivan replenished the bank's depleted executive ranks, boosted morale and increased the bank's profitability, turning it into the city's largest bank. He also helped place First Chicago on a firm foundation by growing its credit card business into the country's second largest credit card lender.

In 1986, he was appointed chairman of the Institute of International Finance, a Washington-based organization representing the world's commercial bankers. He was chairman until 1991.

In 1991, he announced his retirement from a 34-year-career in banking. Upon returning to New York City in 1992, he became deputy mayor for finance and economic development under Mayor David Dinkins, after being approached by David Rockefeller about taking the job. He was instrumental in retaining key financial institutions from leaving the city. Two years later, he was chief operating officer of the New York City Board of Education. He was also president of Greater New York Chamber Of Commerce.

== Other interests ==
In his later years, Sullivan pursued a master's degree in theology at Fordham University and spent a decade as vice chairman of publicly traded power plant owner and operator Sithe Energies.

Outside his business career, Sullivan was involved in the creation of the Big Shoulders Fund, which has raised more than $300 million to support inner-city Catholic schools in the city's poorest neighborhoods. He was also elected to the board of trustees of the University of Chicago in 1980, becoming vice chair of the board from 1985 to 1987 and chair of the board from 1988 to 1992. He was on the board of trustees of Columbia University, Georgetown University, and the Art Institute of Chicago.

== Awards and honors ==
Sullivan was a member of the Knights of Malta and a recipient of the Order of Saint Gregory the Great.

In 1994, he was awarded an honorary LLD from the University of Chicago.

In 1996, he was given a John Jay Award by Columbia College, his alma mater, for his achievements in business and civic leadership.

== Personal life and death ==
Sullivan was married to Audrey Sullivan, who died in 2009. He died on August 11, 2016, at his home in Bronxville, New York after suffering a stroke, and was survived by five children, 17 grandchildren, and his sister.
