= KTFB =

KTFB may refer to:

- KTFB-CA, a low-power television station (channel 4) licensed to Bakersfield, California, United States
- KVCW, a television station (channel 33 analog/29 digital) licensed to Las Vegas, Nevada, United States, which formerly used the call sign KTFB
