= KUVI-DT =

Television station in Bakersfield, California

- Bakersfield, California; United States
- Channels: Digital: 26 (UHF); Virtual: 45

Programming
- Affiliations: 45.1: Quest; 45.2: Univision; 45.3: UniMás; for others, see § Subchannels

Ownership
- Owner: TelevisaUnivision; (KUVI License Partnership, G.P.)
- Sister stations: KABE-CD, KBTF-CD

History
- First air date: December 18, 1988
- Former call signs: KDOB-TV (1988–1991); KUZZ-TV (1991–1997); KUVI (1997–2004); KUVI-TV (2004–2009)
- Former channel numbers: Analog: 45 (UHF, 1988–2009); Digital: 55 (UHF, 2002–2009), 45 (UHF, 2009–2019)
- Former affiliations: Independent (1988–1995); UPN (1995–2006); MyNetworkTV (2006–2017); Justice Network/True Crime Network (2017–2022); Twist (2022–2023)
- Call sign meaning: Univision

Technical information
- Licensing authority: FCC
- Facility ID: 7700
- ERP: 490 kW
- HAAT: 401 m (1,316 ft)
- Transmitter coordinates: 35°26′16.7″N 118°44′26.5″W

Links
- Public license information: Public file; LMS

KUVI-DT (channel 45) is a television station in Bakersfield, California, United States, affiliated with the digital multicast network Quest. It is owned by TelevisaUnivision alongside two Class A stations carrying TelevisaUnivision's networks: Univision station KABE-CD (channel 39), and UniMás station KBTF-CD (channel 31), both of which are also subchannels of KUVI-DT. The three stations share studios at the Univision Broadcast Center on Truxtun Avenue in western Bakersfield; KUVI-DT's transmitter is located atop Mount Adelaide.

Channel 45 went on air in 1988 as KDOB-TV, Bakersfield's first local independent station, and was originally owned by Dorothy Owens. Owens had to settle with five competing applicants to obtain the construction permit, incurring significant debt in the process, and went into bankruptcy reorganization after less than a year in operation. The best offer for the station came from Buck Owens, Dorothy's brother and owner of the KUZZ radio stations; the Federal Communications Commission (FCC) approved the deal in 1990 over protests from competing stations. The station changed its call sign in March 1991 to KUZZ-TV to match its sister radio properties.

While many similar stations affiliated with the Fox network, KUZZ-TV was shut out because KMPH-TV in Visalia, owned by Harry Pappas, claimed rights to the Fox affiliation in Bakersfield as well as Fresno. In 1995, the station affiliated with UPN. Two years later, Buck Owens sold KUZZ-TV to Univision, making it the company's first English-language TV station. The purchase came about because Univision feared displacement of its local low-power TV station by a proposed educational channel; the company committed to honoring the preexisting UPN affiliation agreement. KUVI became the MyNetworkTV affiliate for Bakersfield in 2006 and since 2017 has used its main channel to broadcast a series of diginets.

== History ==
A total of six applicants filed for channel 45 in Bakersfield in 1985. Five of these—Harold L. Mullican, Lash Communications, Liberty Broadcasting, Crown City TV, and Dorothy J. Owens—entered in October 1986 into a settlement agreement, under which Owens won the channel. The other applicants were reimbursed a total of $642,500 for their expenses. Dorothy Owens considered starting KDOB-TV as a Spanish-language station and desired affiliation with Univision, but Univision would not grant the affiliation because it was contractually bound to KFTV in Fresno, which had a translator in Bakersfield. Dorothy Owens ruled out Telemundo, finding its program mix too Caribbean for Bakersfield's Hispanic community. KDOB-TV (for "Dorothy Owens Broadcasting") began broadcasting on December 18, 1988. It was an independent station with a family-friendly mix of programs, including syndicated movies and children's series and Los Angeles Lakers road games. The studios were on Chester Avenue in Oildale, in a building owned by Dorothy's brother, country music artist Buck Owens; it had previously housed the River Theater and Buck Owens's recording studio, and Dorothy had previously worked for Buck.

=== Buck Owens ownership and UPN affiliation ===
Less than a year after signing on the air, in October 1989, Dorothy Owens filed for Chapter 11 bankruptcy reorganization to protect the station from its creditors. The largest secured creditors were two banks, but a group of six program suppliers headlined the list of unsecured creditors. Buck Owens then filed a $4.5 million bid to purchase KDOB-TV and pay its creditors. Because of his ownership of KUZZ-AM-FM, he was normally not eligible to buy the station. However, in bankruptcy, the FCC was more predisposed to waive its one-to-a-market rule for stations at risk of leaving the air. The licensees of Bakersfield's three other TV stations—KGET-TV, KERO-TV, and KBAK-TV—and KMPH-TV in Visalia all objected to the deal. They pointed to Buck Owens guaranteeing a $1.5 million loan to Dorothy before the station went on the air; called the financing action deliberate to allow use of the so-called "failed station" waiver; and went on to declare the bankruptcy proceeding a "sham" devised to allow Buck Owens to take control of channel 45. A second bidder, Riklis Broadcasting (owner of KADY-TV in Oxnard), presented an offer, but it was far lower than the Owens bid, which would repay creditors in full.

The bankruptcy court approved the sale to Buck Owens on February 28, 1990. The FCC rejected the other stations' arguments as to the transaction, calling the deal a "last resort", and approved the sale in August. The deal closed in November, allowing Buck Owens to infuse new capital into purchasing programming. On March 18, 1991, KDOB-TV changed its call sign to KUZZ-TV to match the other Buck Owens stations. In June 1993, channel 45 left Oildale to move into the complex on Sillect Avenue that housed KUZZ radio. Later that year, the station was the victim of a $1 million arson that destroyed its transmitter atop Mount Adelaide; a convicted felon was found to have likely been hired to carry out the crime.

As Buck Owens relaunched channel 45, he inquired as to becoming the Fox affiliate for Bakersfield. However, he encountered significant roadblocks. The network alleged that cable penetration in Bakersfield, and thus access to KMPH-TV or KTTV from Los Angeles, was high enough that another affiliate was unnecessary. KMPH-TV's owner, Harry Pappas, wielded significant influence within Fox as an active participant in network governance and the progenitor of Fox Kids, which was structured as a consortium of Fox affiliates. He had obtained the Bakersfield-market rights to the network when KMPH affiliated with Fox in 1988. Pappas questioned the wisdom of Fox affiliating with KUZZ-TV as a potential "duplication of service" given the relatively strong over-the-air signal and cable availability of KMPH-TV. In 1994, KMPH-TV set up a translator in Bakersfield on channel 58 as it prepared to move its transmitter to the north. In January 1995, KUZZ-TV affiliated with the new UPN network.

=== Univision ownership ===
Buck Owens agreed in June 1997 to sell KUZZ-TV to Univision for $14 million. The station had not been actively on the market, but Univision approached with an initial offer of $12 million, was rebuffed, and won with a higher bid. The sale represented a tripling of Buck Owens's investment in the station. The acquisition was unusual for Univision, giving the company its first English-language TV station. The company committed to keeping channel 45 an English-language station, including honoring a recent renewal of its affiliation with UPN. The main reason for the acquisition was to give Univision a fallback. KABE-LP, the low-power Univision station in Bakersfield, operated on channel 39, which also was a reserved educational channel for Bakersfield, and there was talk of a station being created to use it and thereby displace KABE. Local management concluded it would hurt channel 45—renamed KUVI—if UPN were demoted to low-power more than it would help Univision by moving to the full-power signal.

In 2006, when UPN merged with The WB to form The CW, KUVI affiliated with MyNetworkTV.

On September 11, 2017, KUVI-DT became an affiliate of the Justice Network (now True Crime Network) as part of an 11-market partnership between Univision and the diginet. On January 3, 2022, it switched affiliations from True Crime Network to Twist. Twist shut down at the end of 2023 and was replaced with Quest.

== Technical information ==
=== Subchannels ===
KUVI's transmitter is located atop Mount Adelaide. The station's signal is multiplexed:

Subchannels of KUVI-DT
Subchannel	Res.	Short name	Programming
45.1	480i	KUVI-DT	Quest
45.2	720p	UVN HD	Univision (KABE-CD)
45.3	720p	UNM HD	UniMás (KBTF-CD)
45.4	480i	Nosey	Nosey
45.5	480i	Confess	Confess
45.6	480i	ShopLC	Shop LC
45.7	480i	BT2	Infomercials
45.8	480i	MSGold	MovieSphere Gold

Simulcast of subchannels of another station
Subchannel broadcast with MPEG-4 video

=== Analog-to-digital conversion ===
KUVI-TV began broadcasting a digital signal on August 12, 2002; it discontinued regular programming on its analog signal, over UHF channel 45, on June 12, 2009, the official date on which full-power television stations in the United States transitioned from analog to digital broadcasts under federal mandate. The station's digital signal relocated from its pre-transition UHF channel 55, which was among the high band UHF channels (52–69) that were removed from broadcasting use as a result of the transition, to its analog-era UHF channel 45.

KUVI-DT relocated its signal from channel 45 to channel 26 on June 21, 2019, as a result of the 2016 United States wireless spectrum auction.

== See also ==
- Buck Owens
