= Walter E. Heller =

American businessman (1891–1969)

Walter E. Heller (1891–1969) was a US financier and philanthropist, who founded Walter E. Heller and Company, Inc., Chicago, Illinois with money borrowed from his father in 1919. He originally started the company to do "automobile financing" as autos became more popular in the 1920s. The firm developed into a highly successful, multi-faceted international financial company that was a leader in various fields of finance, particularly in factoring.

== Heller Financial ==
Walter E. Heller and Co., Inc. was a finance company involved in leasing, factoring, asset-based commercial lending, commercial real estate lending and owned manufacturing companies located throughout the United States and abroad. The company was also involved with commercial real estate development and construction.

The manufacturing subsidiaries were subsequently sold off, as required by U.S. anti-trust bank ownership laws, when the company purchased American National Corporation in Chicago, the holding company for American National Bank and Trust Company, in 1973 for $108.8 million. Ten years later, Walter E. Heller International Corporation sold American National Corporation to First Chicago Corporation for $275 million.

Walter E. Heller International was purchased in 1985 by Fuji Bank and was renamed Heller Financial when new leadership was brought in to change the focus after U.S. banks began competing directly with commercial finance companies and business lending institutions. Heller Financial began trading on the Chicago Stock Exchange on May 8, 1998. At that time, it was one of the largest initial public offerings on record. Subsequently, Heller Financial was purchased by GE Capital during the early 2000s.

== Factoring ==
Heller was a pioneer of the use of factoring and developed it into a more sophisticated form of finance of company business accounts receivable, thus providing capital for businesses to grow by giving them cash to expand the business cycle by purchasing an account receivable at a discount, with or without recourse to the seller. Then, by owning it, he would collect the balance of the receivable in full. The profit was derived by the amount of discount collected by the factor. As the factoring business expanded, it was done in bulk with contractually obligated clients selling their receivables by assignment to the factoring company. Advances against these receivables purchased were made and the client paid a fee to the factor. As American businesses became more sophisticated and manufacturing became more prominent after World War II, certain industries turned to factoring as a form of business finance and credit insurance on the credit risk of its customers. These industries were primarily involved with the manufacturing of textiles and carpeting, although other businesses used this type of financing model for their own credit needs. Capital for businesses was not then available from banks because the banks felt business loans were too risky.

== Personal ==
Heller married Florence Grunsfeld Heller (1897–1966) in Chicago on February 22, 1917. They had three children, John Andrew, Peter Eugene, and Paul Walter. They were divorced in 1953. He later married Alyce DeCosta.

The Roosevelt University business school is named after him while Brandeis University's Heller School for Social Policy is named after his wife, Florence. Several Chicago-area parks bear his name, as well as the Walter E. Heller Foundation, a philanthropic supporter of PBS.
