= Jet Support Services =

Jet Support Services, Inc. (JSSI) is a maintenance support and financial services provider to the aviation industry. The company offers hourly cost maintenance, or Power by the Hour, programs for corporate and private aircraft engines, APUs and airframes. The company's JSSI Parts & Leasing division provides parts, engine and APU leasing support for approximately 10,000 aircraft maintenance events each year. Following the acquisitions of TRAXXALL, SierraTrax and Conklin & de Decker, JSSI also offers aircraft consulting services and software to support aircraft owners and operators with aircraft maintenance tracking, acquisition, financing and operating decisions.

JSSI was founded in 1989 and is headquartered in Chicago, Illinois, and Farnborough, UK. In 2008, the company was acquired by RH Book Enterprises and 1848 Capital Partners, LLC. In 2020, private equity firm GTCR partnered with JSSI to recapitalize the company.
