= KHTI =

Simulcasting KATY-FM, Idyllwild, CA
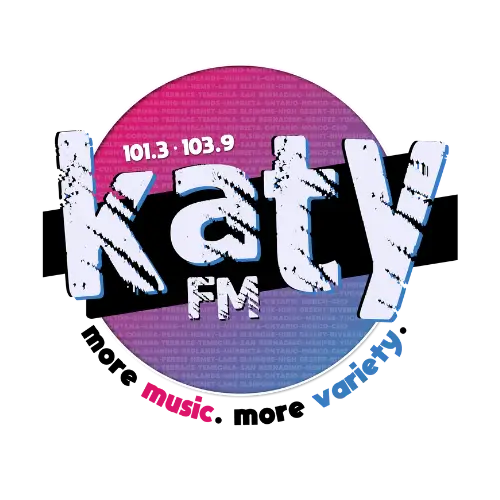
- Lake Arrowhead, California; United States
- Broadcast area: Riverside; San Bernardino
- Frequency: 103.9 MHz
- Branding: 101.3 & 103.9 Katy FM

Programming
- Format: Adult contemporary
- Affiliations: Compass Media Networks; Los Angeles Chargers

Ownership
- Owner: All Pro Broadcasting, Inc.
- Sister stations: KATY-FM

History
- First air date: June 16, 1978
- Former call signs: KBON-FM (1978–1992); KCKC-FM (1992–1993); KABE (1993–1994); KAEV (1994–1995); KCXX (1995–2015)
- Call sign meaning: "Hot 103.9" (former branding)

Technical information
- Licensing authority: FCC
- Facility ID: 2398
- Class: A
- ERP: 180 watts
- HAAT: 548 meters (1,798 ft)
- Transmitter coordinates: 34.234°N 117.141°W

Links
- Public license information: Public file; LMS
- Webcast: Listen live
- Website: www.katyfm.com

KHTI (103.9 FM) is a commercial radio station licensed to Lake Arrowhead, California, United States, and serving the Riverside–San Bernardino area of the Inland Empire. KHTI simulcasts an adult contemporary format with KATY (101.3 FM) in nearby Temecula; both stations are owned by All Pro Broadcasting, a corporation controlled by the estate of Pro Football Hall of Fame member Willie Davis. The stations carry Los Angeles Chargers NFL games.

KHTI's transmitter is on Ongo Camp Road in Lake Arrowhead. The studios are on Airport Drive in San Bernardino.

== History ==
On June 16, 1978, the station signed on the air as KBON-FM. It had beautiful music format, aimed at the growing adult population in the Inland Empire. It played quarter-hour sweeps of mostly instrumental music, with some soft vocals. The signal was strong enough to reach parts of the Morongo Basin and the Victor Valley areas.

In 1984, KBON-FM changed to an adult contemporary format under the name "K-104". In 1987, KBON-FM again changed formats to 1960s and 70s oldies.

On September 1, 1992, KBON-FM became KCKC-FM, making 103.9 a full simulcast of KCKC (1350 AM, now KPWK). KCKC had been broadcasting in San Bernardino for 25 years with a country music format, from 1966 to 1992.

On October 31, 1993, KCKC-FM became KABE, as it changed to a simulcast of KACE (also on 103.9 FM), which broadcast to the nearby Los Angeles metropolitan area. Covering most of Los Angeles and the Inland Empire, the simulcast briefly experimented with a hip hop/R&B format as "The New V103.9".

On October 2, 1994, KABE became KAEV. Owner Willie Davis learned that sister station WLUM-FM in Milwaukee had personalities playing uncensored tracks and cursing on-air in late night FCC safe harbor hours, and had personally disapproved of the hardcore rap music which had become prevalent in hip-hop. KAEV tried a transitional format of lighter 'positive' rap, but the ratings were not promising.

On January 1, 1995, KAEV ended its simulcast with KACE, as the station flipped to alternative rock as "X103.9" and changed call letters to KCXX. The first song played was "Closer" by Nine Inch Nails. (This matched WLUM's post-1995 programming direction, also flipping to alternative rock).

The rock format lasted two decades. On December 21, 2015, KCXX announced it would end its alternative format the following morning, citing falling ratings and increased competition from Internet music services for the reasoning behind the change.

Previous logo

On December 22, 2015, at 7 a.m., after playing "Snuff" by Slipknot, KCXX flipped to rhythmic hot AC as "Hot 103.9". The first song on "Hot" was "Time of Our Lives" by Pitbull. The station changed its call sign to KHTI on the same day as the flip.

An automated alternative format continued as a separate mobile app under the former "X103.9" brand, but the mobile app has been removed from Google and Apple's app stores as of May 2018. As of fall 2018, the station has adjusted to a more conventional hot adult contemporary format.

On December 26, 2024, at 6 a.m., KHTI began simulcasting KATY-FM.
