= KLVE =

Spanish-language radio station in Los Angeles

- Los Angeles, California; United States
- Broadcast area: Los Angeles metropolitan area; Victorville, California
- Frequency: 107.5 MHz (HD Radio)
- Branding: K-LOVE 107.5

Programming
- Language: Spanish
- Format: Adult contemporary
- Subchannels: HD2: Radio Jan (Armenian Radio); HD3: ARM Music Radio (Armenian Radio); HD4: Pop FM (Russian Radio)

Ownership
- Owner: Uforia Audio Network; (KLVE-FM License Corp.)
- Sister stations: KLXM/KLXO; KSCA; KFTR-DT; KMEX-DT

History
- First air date: May 2, 1959
- Former call signs: KBBI (1959–1971); KPSA (1971–1973); KEZM (1973–1974)
- Call sign meaning: "K-Love"

Technical information
- Licensing authority: FCC
- Facility ID: 35086
- Class: B
- ERP: 29,500 watts
- HAAT: 914 meters (2,999 ft)
- Transmitter coordinates: 34°13′44″N 118°04′05″W
- Repeater: 107.5 KLVE-FM1 (Santa Clarita)

Links
- Public license information: Public file; LMS
- Webcast: Listen live (via iHeartRadio); Listen live (HD2)
- Website: www.univision.com/los-angeles/klve/ radiojan.com (HD2) popradio.fm (HD4)

KLVE (107.5 FM, "107.5 K-LOVE") is a commercial radio station licensed to Los Angeles, California, with a Spanish AC format. The station is owned by TelevisaUnivision, and is the flagship station for the Uforia Audio Network. The station has studios and offices located on Center Drive (near I-405) in West Los Angeles, and the transmitter is located atop Mount Wilson. KLVE also uses a 100-watt booster station in Santa Clarita, KLVE-FM1 on 107.5 MHz.

== History ==
=== Early years ===
On May 2, 1959, the station first signed on as KBBI owned by the Bible Institute of Los Angeles. Airing a Christian radio format, it marked a re-entry to radio operations for the Bible Institute since selling off KTBI (1300 AM) in 1931; now known as KWKW (1330 AM), that station remains the oldest surviving radio station in the United States to have been signed on by a religious institution. In 1970, the Bible Institute, then doing business as Biola Schools and Colleges, sold KBBI and sister station KBBW in San Diego to PSA Broadcasting, a subsidiary of San Diego–based Pacific Southwest Airlines, for $1.15 million. PSA changed KBBI's call sign to KPSA in 1971, followed by KEZM in 1973. PSA operated four stations in California, all with easy listening formats; KPSA was marketed primarily to women, complete with an in-house poet.

=== KLVE – "K-Love" ===
On September 4, 1974, the station changed its call letters to KLVE and began airing a soft rock format, using the slogans "Something to Love", and "Get Your Rock Soft". In September 1975, K-Love Broadcasting Inc. bought the station. By the late 1970s, the new ownership ushered in the first Spanish-language FM station in Los Angeles.

KLVE has consistently been the market's leading Spanish-language station for decades. It has maintained that lead with the advent of Arbitron's Portable People Meter (PPM) electronic ratings measurement. With a weekly audience of nearly two million people, KLVE is among the most listened-to Spanish-language radio stations in the U.S., usually second to WSKQ in New York City, according to Nielsen Audio.

The KLVE studio was located in Hollywood from 1975 to 1999. In 2000, it moved to Glendale, on Central Avenue south of the CA-134 Freeway. In 2013, as part of Univision Radio, KLVE joined sister radio stations KTNQ (1020 AM), KSCA (101.9 FM), KRCD (103.9 FM and KRCV (98.3 FM) at the Univision Los Angeles Broadcast Center west of the I-405 Freeway in Los Angeles.

KLVE is unrelated to K-Love, an English-language Christian radio network owned by the non-profit Educational Media Foundation (EMF) based in Rocklin, California. Within California, the EMF's trademark for "K-Love" does not apply in Los Angeles, Orange, Ventura, Inyo, western portions of San Bernardino, San Diego, eastern portions of Kern, and western portions of Riverside, where Univision holds exclusive rights to the name under its own trademark registration. When the EMF acquired Los Angeles's KSWD as part of Entercom's merger with CBS Radio, the broadcaster was required to reach an agreement with Univision in order to use the "K-Love" brand within networked programming on the station; although details were not specified, the station is promoted locally under the name "Positive, Encouraging 100.3", with the positioning statement "the K-Love for Christian music".

== On-air personalities ==
KLVE's morning show had been co-hosted by the husband-and-wife duo of Omar Velasco and Argelia Atilano (1993 graduate of Garfield High School in East Los Angeles) since 2003. On October 11, 2021, morning radio personalities Omar Velasco and Argelia Atilano were replaced by afternoon radio personality Ysaac Alvarez to take over the morning duties. News anchor Richard Santiago and traffic reporter Liz Alvarado cover the news and rush-hour traffic reports for the morning show as well.

== HD Radio ==
KLVE broadcasts four channels in HD. While the primary channel simulcasts the station’s FM signal, channels HD2 and HD3 air Armenian-language programming and channel HD4 airs Russian-language programming.
