= KLQV =

Radio station in San Diego

Coordinates: 32.840°N 117.249°W

- San Diego, California; United States
- Broadcast area: San Diego-Tijuana
- Frequency: 102.9 MHz
- Branding: Amor 102.9

Programming
- Format: Spanish AC

Ownership
- Owner: Uforia Audio Network; (Univision Radio Stations Group, Inc.)
- Sister stations: KLNV

History
- First air date: 1963 (as KBBW)
- Former call signs: KBBW (1963–1972); KPSE (1972–1974); KEZL (1974–1984); KSDO-FM (1984–1987); KSWV (1987–1989); KSDO-FM (1989–1992); KCLX (1992–1995); KKBH (1995–1997); KJQY (1997–1998); KCDE (10/17/1998-10/28/1998)
- Call sign meaning: K-Love (first Spanish format)

Technical information
- Facility ID: 51164
- Class: B
- ERP: 30,000 watts
- HAAT: 192.7 meters

Links
- Webcast: Listen Live
- Website: Amor 102.9

KLQV (102.9 FM, "Amor 102.9") is a Spanish AC radio station in San Diego, California, broadcasting from an antenna located on top of Mount Soledad in La Jolla. The station is owned by TelevisaUnivision along with KLNV. It forms as a part of the Uforia Audio Network.

== History ==
The station signed on in 1963 as KBBW and was owned by the Bible Institute of Los Angeles. While the application had been filed in 1959, several changes, including a callsign change and a frequency change from the original 102.5 MHz, had occurred before the station went on air.

In 1970, the Bible Institute, then doing business as Biola Schools and Colleges, sold KBBW and sister station KBBI in Los Angeles to PSA Broadcasting, a subsidiary of San Diego–based Pacific Southwest Airlines, for $1.15 million. PSA changed KBBW's callsign to KPSE, then to KEZL in 1974. The company operated four stations in California, all with easy listening formats.

In 1984, KEZL dropped easy listening to become Top 40-formatted KSDO-FM, known on air as "KS103". Several different formats followed in the late 1980s and 1990s. On September 25, 1987, the station was renamed KSWV and began a two-year stint with a smooth jazz format known as "The Wave". On August 31, 1989, the station flipped to classic rock as KSDO-FM ("Classic 103"), changing call letters to KCLX in March 1992; this format lasted until April 1995. The classic rock format was then changed to 70s Hits and later a Soft AC format as KKBH ("The Beach"), followed by adult contemporary with the branding "Mix 102.9".

In the fall of 1997, after market research showed some ratings reporters still wrote KJQY in their diaries, "K-Joy" was launched on 102.9 FM, marking the return of the callsign that had formerly existed on 103.7.

Jacor, which owned KJQY along with other stations, bought Nationwide Broadcasting, which owned additional stations in the San Diego radio market, in 1997. The combination of the two clusters necessitated a sale to stay under FCC ownership limits. Jacor shed KJQY, along with KKLQ at 106.5, to Heftel Broadcasting, a forerunner to today's Univision Radio, and moved the KJQY calls and format to 94.1 MHz.

Heftel, an operator of primarily Spanish-language radio stations, set up shop in San Diego, changing the station's calls to KLQV after 11 days with a placeholder callsign. After a stint as "K-Love 102.9" (no relation to the Christian radio network of the same name and, coincidentally, a name used by Los Angeles sister station KLVE, the station rebranded as "Viva 102.9" in 2004.

In early 2006, prompted by the flip of XHOCL-FM to Spanish oldies, KLQV flipped to the format as well to provide competition. The move resulted in an immediate ratings boost; after the station rated a 1.0 in the fall 2005 Arbitron ratings, the number soared to 3.4, making it the No. 1 rated Spanish language radio station in the San Diego radio market. In April 2014, KLQV switched to Spanish Adult Hits as 102.9 FM Más Variedad.

On February 6, 2018, Univision dropped the "Más Variedad" Spanish Adult Hits format and switched it to Spanish AC as Amor 102.9. Although the music and radio shows are syndicated and heard from KBRG in San Jose and KOMR in Phoenix simultaneously, which also carries the Amor format. The “Amor” stations are similar to KLVE in Los Angeles which is one of the most listened Spanish language radio stations in the United States.

In March 2019, Univision placed all their stations into their new Uforia Audio Network, The station joined Uforia on March 15.
