= KATY-FM =

Coordinates: 33.725°N 116.750°W

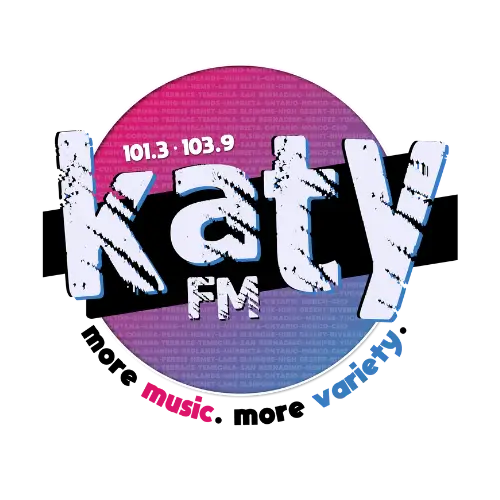
- Idyllwild, California; United States
- Broadcast area: Riverside - San Bernardino - Inland Empire
- Frequency: 101.3 MHz
- Branding: 101.3 & 103.9 Katy FM

Programming
- Format: Adult contemporary
- Affiliations: Compass Media Networks; Los Angeles Chargers Radio Network

History
- First air date: December 1, 1989

Technical information
- Licensing authority: FCC
- Facility ID: 33611
- Class: A
- ERP: 1,550 watts
- HAAT: 200 meters (660 ft)
- Repeater: 103.9 KHTI (Lake Arrowhead)

Links
- Public license information: Public file; LMS

KATY-FM (101.3 MHz, "101.3 & 103.9 Katy FM"), is a commercial radio station licensed to Idyllwild, California, and serving the southeastern portion of the Riverside-San Bernardino radio market in the Inland Empire. It simulcasts an adult contemporary radio format, described as "More Music, More Variety," with sister station 103.9 KHTI in Lake Arrowhead.

KATY and KHTI are owned and operated by All Pro Broadcasting, which in turn is owned by the estate of the late Green Bay Packers star Willie Davis. The studios and offices are in Temecula. KATY's transmitter is near Mount San Jacinto State Park.

The current on-air staff includes Jeff Pope, Mia "Mama Mia" and Chris Ramone. KATY and KHTI carry the nationally syndicated Anna & Raven (Anna Zapotosky and Jeff Raven) morning show and John Tesh Intelligence for Your Life in evenings. During the NFL football season, KATY airs Los Angeles Chargers games.

== History ==
On December 1, 1989, the station signed on the air. It was founded by Kay Sadler-Gill, at a time when few women owned radio stations. Sadler-Gill's nickname "Katy" is reflected in the station's call sign, KATY-FM.

Previous logo

In 2001, the station was purchased by All-Pro Broadcasting for $3.5 million. On January 16, KATY switched its format to soft adult contemporary and rebranded as "KATY 101.3 Lite & Refreshing." As the decade went on, KATY stepped up the tempo and transitioned to mainstream adult contemporary music.
