= Stanley Golder =

Stanley C. Golder
- Born: February 16, 1929
- Died: January 5, 2000 (aged 70); Winnetka, Illinois
- Known for: Private equity investor, Founder of GTCR and First Chicago Investment Corporation

Stanley C. Golder (February 16, 1929 – January 5, 2000) was an American financier and venture capitalist.

He is the namesake of the Stanley C. Golder Center for the Study of Private Equity at the University of Illinois at Urbana-Champaign, from which he graduated (B.S., 1951).

== Career ==
His early jobs were with First National Bank of Chicago and its affiliates, promoted up to executive vice president. In early 1970s he was made president of First Capital Corporation of Chicago and First Chicago Investment Corporation.

In the 1970s, Golder built the private equity program at First Chicago Corp. where he is noted primarily for backing Federal Express and for efforts as chairman of the National Venture Capital Association and the National Association of Small Business Investment Companies to change federal laws allowing pensions to invest in private equity.

In 1980 he left First Chicago to found "Golder, Thoma & Cressey" private equity investment company, later known as GTCR, from which he retired as partner in 1993, but remained consultant. Golder Thoma received much of its initial funding from William M. Blair and upon leaving First Chicago, Golder was replaced by John A. Canning Jr. who would go on to found rival Chicago private equity firm Madison Dearborn.

== Personal ==
Stanley Golder was married to Joan Jacobi Golder.

He was president of the Chicago chapter of the American Jewish Committee

In 1994 the Golders received the Human Rights Medallion from the American Jewish Committee.

Among Golders' charitable deeds was a $1.5 million gift to the UIUC to endow the Stanley C. and Joan J. Golder Distinguished Chair in Corporate Finance.

Stanley Golder died of cancer at Evanston Hospital.
