= Straus National Bank and Trust Company (Chicago) =

Financial institution in Chicago, Illinois, USA

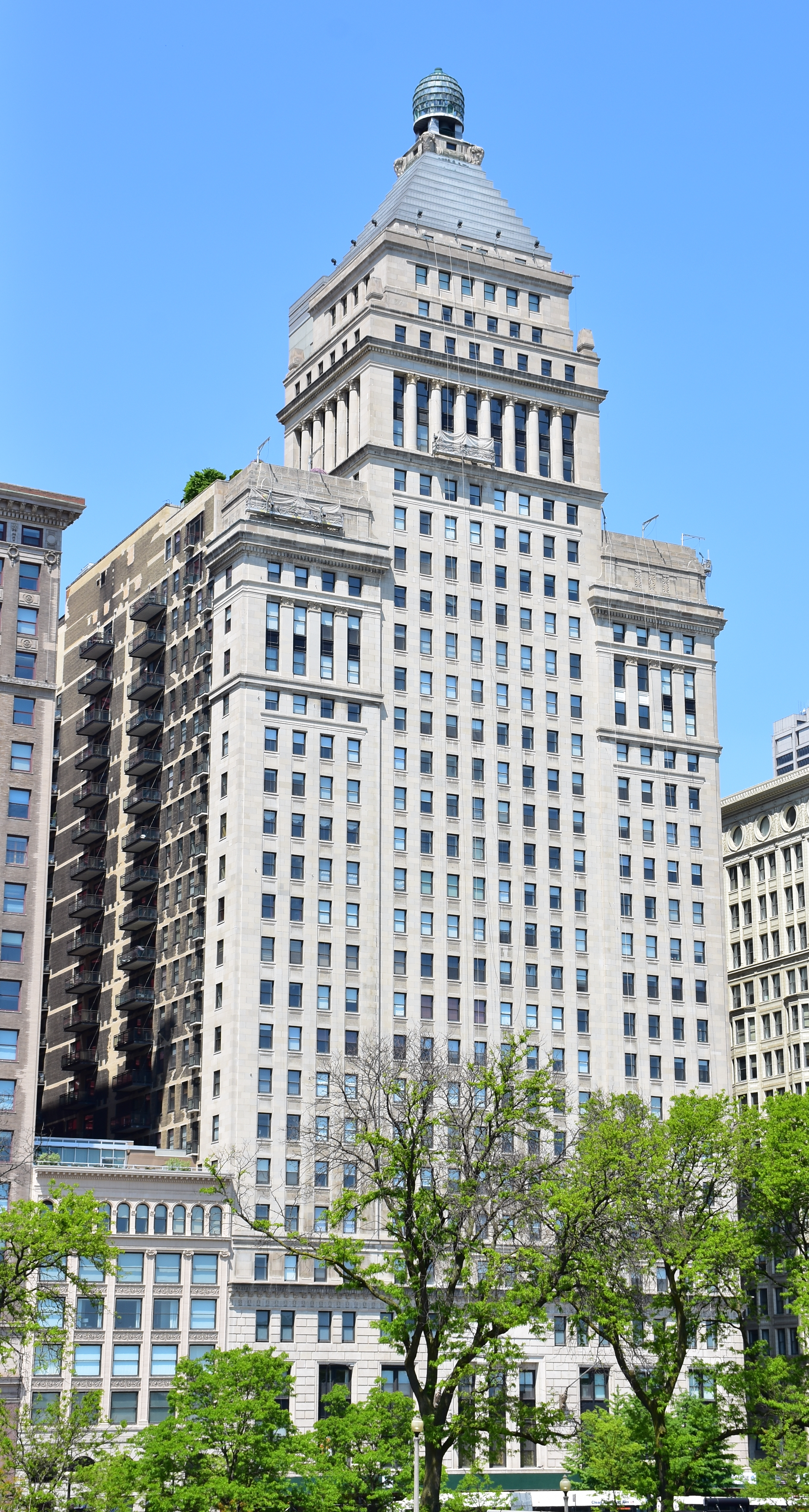
- Industry: Financial
- Predecessor: Straus Trust Company
- Founded: June 28, 1928; 98 years ago in Chicago, Illinois, United States
- Founder: Simon Straus
- Successor: American National Bank and Trust Company
- Headquarters: Straus Building, Chicago, Illinois
- Services: General commercial, savings bank, and trust business

The Straus National Bank and Trust Company was a financial institution based in Chicago, Illinois. It was founded in 1928 out of the Straus Trust Company. In 1933 the bank changed its name from the Straus National Bank and Trust Company to the American National Bank and Trust Company. In 1973, the Walter E. Heller International Corporation acquired the American National Bank and Trust Company of Chicago. As the fifth largest bank in Chicago at the time, American National had assets of $1.3 billion. In 1984 First Chicago Corporation acquired American National Corporation, the bank's holding company, for around $275 million.

== History ==
=== 1928–1929: Founding of the bank ===
The Straus National Bank and Trust Company of Chicago was incorporated on June 27, 1928. The bank was authorized to carry on a general commercial, savings bank, and trust business, taking over all the business of the Straus Trust Company, which had been founded in 1924 as an Illinois State bank. The new bank had an initial capitalization of $1,000,000, a surplus of $250,000 and a special reserve of $50,000. Simon W. Straus of Chicago was president, S. J. T. Straus was executive VP, John H. Kraft was VP and cashier, and J. H. Frazier was VP and trust officer. Of the former Straus Trust Company, the offices of the Straus Building at Jackson Boulevard and Michigan Avenue were retained by the new company. At the close of business on November 21, 1929, the Straus National Bank and Trust Company had reported deposits of $17,952,297, and undivided profits of $573,778.

=== 1930–1971: As American National ===
On January 3, 1933, the bank changed its name from the Straus National Bank and Trust Company to the American National Bank and Trust Company. Vice president M. L. Straus announced the change. It was later acquired by the Manufacturers Trust Company of New York, when that bank "took over some collateral securing loans made to individuals formerly identified with the management of the bank." As of March 1933, it had deposits of $10,542,000 and was a member of the Federal Reserve System.

On June 16, 1933, control of the American National Bank and Trust Company of Chicago was bought by a "syndicate of local business men headed by Weymouth Kirkland," with Kirkland announcing the purchase in New York. S. J. T. Straus was expected to resign shortly afterwards as president, with Melvin L. Straus continuing as executive vice president and continuing to hold investments in the bank. As of March 1934, Melvin L. Straus remained executive vice president.

On September 18, 1962, the president of the American National Bank and Trust Company of Chicago, Robert E. Straus, announced that Leigh R. Gignilliat Jr. had been appointed senior vice president. Gigniliat had been a VP of the commercial division since 1941, and was a director at companies such as the Martin Marietta Corporation.

=== 1972–1983: Walter E. Heller ownership ===
By the 1970s, the American National Bank and Trust Company of Chicago was the primary subsidiary of the holding company American National Corporation. After an earlier proposal, on August 14, 1972, the Walter E. Heller International Corporation announced that it had increased an offer to acquire the American National Corporation for $48 a common share. In a 4 to 2 split decision, on May 11, 1973, the Federal Reserve Board approved the Walter E. Heller International Corporation's acquisition of the American National Bank and Trust Company of Chicago. While the majority found it would not destroy competition, the dissenters argued that the deal authorized "the largest combinations of financial resources that has ever occurred in the history of Federal bank supervision.” As the fifth largest bank in Chicago at the time, American National had assets of $1.3 billion, while as the twelfth largest finance company in the United States, Walter Heller had assets of $1 billion. Under decision, Heller International became a bank holding company, with orders to divest itself of its manufacturing subsidiaries within two years. Two days after the Walter E. Heller International Corporation purchased of Chicago's American National Bank, on August 3, 1973 it was reported that Heller was undergoing management changes, with some officers in American National also taking positions in the holding company, "including Allen P. Stults, 60, who was named president, and William G. Ericsson, 46, executive vice president." At American National, Stults remained chairman and chief executive, and Ericsson remained president.

Compared with 1979, in 1980 the earnings of American National Bank and Trust rose 13.7 percent, to $22.5 million. However, the Times reported that "some analysts see the bank as a drag on Heller's performance." At the time, Illinois was a single-unit banking state that did not allow branch banking, interstate branching, and had constraints on export trade. In 1981, the New York Times reported that "restrictive legislation governing interstate and intrastate branch banking has forestalled Heller's efforts to make its ownership of the American National Bank and Trust Company in Chicago a truly integrated part of its organization."

=== 1984-1990s: Ownership by First Chicago ===
In May 1984, the largest bank holding company in Chicago, First Chicago Corporation, acquired American National Corporation from the Walter E. Heller International Corporation for around $275 million. The bank had a successful year in 1984, serving "middle market" companies that were small and medium in size. That year, its earnings jumped 32 percent, and it had record earnings of $34.1 million that year. In early 1985, the American National Bank and Trust Company of Chicago remained the fifth-largest bank in Chicago. It had $3.8 billion in assets, with around 1,200 customers. Keene H. Addington served as president. On July 1, 1990, Ronald J. Grayheck became CEO of both the American National Bank and Trust Company of Chicago and the American National Corporation upon the retirement of Chairman and CEO Michael E. Tobin who assumed those positions in 1978 upon the retirement of Allen P. Stults. As of April 1995, American National Corporation remained a wholly owned subsidiary of First Chicago Corporation.

== See also ==
- List of bank mergers in the United States
- Banking in the United States
