= KSCA (FM) =

Radio station in Glendale, California, United States

Coordinates: 34.224°N 118.063°W

- Glendale, California; United States
- Broadcast area: Greater Los Angeles Victorville, California
- Frequency: 101.9 MHz (HD Radio)
- Branding: LA Nueva 101.9

Programming
- Format: Regional Mexican
- Subchannels: HD2: Persian Iranian (KIRN); HD3: TUDN Radio
- Affiliations: Mexico National Football Team (TUDN Radio)

Ownership
- Owner: Uforia Audio Network; (Univision Radio Illinois, Inc.)
- Sister stations: KLVE; KLXM/KLXO; KMEX-DT; KFTR-DT

History
- First air date: March 22, 1952
- Former call signs: KUTE (1952–1987); KMPC-FM (1987–1989); KEDG (March–May 1989); KLIT (1989–1994)
- Call sign meaning: Southern California

Technical information
- Licensing authority: FCC
- Facility ID: 24548
- Class: B
- ERP: 4,800 watts
- HAAT: 863.0 meters (2,831.4 ft)
- Repeater: 101.9 KSCA-FM1 (Santa Clarita)

Links
- Public license information: Public file; LMS
- Webcast: Listen live
- Website: la1019.univision.com

KSCA (101.9 FM, "LA Nueva 101.9") is a commercial radio station licensed to Glendale, California, United States, and serving Greater Los Angeles. Owned by TelevisaUnivision, KSCA airs a regional Mexican format, with studios on Center Drive (near Interstate 405) in West Los Angeles and transmitter on Mount Wilson.

KSCA broadcasts in the HD Radio format. KSCA is also broadcast on booster KSCA-FM1 (101.9 FM) in Santa Clarita, California.

== History ==
=== Early years ===
The station first signed on the air on March 22, 1952, as KUTE, originally programming a "good music" format from studios in downtown Los Angeles and transmitter atop Flint Peak, just west of the Rose Bowl in Pasadena. It was owned by Robert P. Adams, who served as its president and general manager.

In 1972, KUTE was sold to the Progress Radio Network (which changed its name to Tracy Broadcasting one year later) and changed hands again in 1979 to Inner City Broadcasting Corporation, a black-owned radio company based in New York City. It was during this tenure that KUTE shifted to a disco format under Inner City's first year of ownership.

=== KUTE - Urban contemporary and The Quiet Storm ===
Under Inner City's ownership, KUTE became one of the original stations in the United States to launch a format that would later be called urban contemporary (after shifting away from disco in 1980), playing the latest R&B, funk and soul music, featuring local DJs such as "Humble Harve", Brian Roberts and "Lucky Pierre." KUTE was also the starting point for many successful radio careers, including veteran program director Rick Thomas, who was hired in 1982 to do weekends on air by then-PD Lucky Pierre. During this time, mornings were hosted by Brian Roberts, afternoon drive by Charlie Fox and evenings with Joe Greene. Weekends also featured Ed Mann, Buster Jones, Scott Lockwood and Strawberry Jan Marie.

At 2:00 a.m. on Sunday mornings, KUTE would host an hour of disco/dance mixes, usually pre-mixed vinyl albums specially created for DJs. KUTE was one of the first radio stations to air a "mega-mix" when the "Michael Jackson Mega-Mix" debuted in the summer of 1983, capitalizing on the success of Jackson's Thriller album earlier in the year. DJ Mario Flores later hosted a disco dance DJ 12" specialty show Sunday mornings from 2:00 a.m. to 3:00 a.m. featuring 15-minute disco mixes, mixed by well known DJs around the U.S. KUTE was quite successful in this format, and became a template for the Urban Adult Contemporary stations of today.

In late 1983, KUTE changed its format and name to "The Quiet Storm", playing very mellow, soft, contemporary smooth jazz. Just two years later, in August 1985, Gene Autry's Golden West Broadcasters, which owned KMPC (now KSPN), bought KUTE in the range between $10 and $16 million.

=== KMPC - "Full Spectrum Rock" ===
Golden West initially maintained the Quiet Storm format, but its ratings plummeted by 50% in 1987, prompting the station to fire its airstaff and prepare for a new direction.

On October 4, 1987, KUTE changed its call sign to KMPC-FM, and flipped to a format dubbed "Full Spectrum Rock", a mixture of classic rock, adult album alternative (AAA) and progressive rock. Many of the DJs who were let go from the defunct KMET that same year joined KMPC-FM, including Paraquat Kelley, Cynthia Foxx and Jim Ladd. J. J. Jackson, veteran of KLOS throughout the 1970s, and one of the original MTV VJs in the early 1980s, was program director at this time.

=== KEDG - "The Edge" ===
In March 1989, the call letters were once again changed, this time to KEDG, referred to by listeners as "The Edge". KEDG continued the same rock format as its predecessor until May 12, 1989, when its call letters and format were once again changed.

=== KLIT - "K-Lite" ===
On May 12, 1989, the station adopted a soft adult contemporary format, rebranded as "K-Lite", and changed call letters to KLIT.

=== FM 101.9 - "LA's Finest Rock" ===
On July 1, 1994, at 5 p.m., KLIT reverted to KMPC's and KEDG's AAA format as "FM 101.9", featuring the Dr. Demento show in the afternoons. Also added to the already eclectic playlist were the then new folk-rock artists that became very popular during the resurgence of that genre in the 1990s, including Jewel, Sarah McLachlan, The Wallflowers, Suzanne Vega, Shawn Colvin and Sheryl Crow (the latter artist's "All I Wanna Do" was the first song played). Upon FCC approval, the call sign switched to KSCA on September 1, 1994. FM 101.9 was known as "Southern California's Album Alternative", which later morphed into "LA's Finest Rock".

Mike Morrison joined as Program Director from WXPN in Philadelphia. Nicole Sandler, formerly with KLOS and The Mark & Brian Show, joined for middays. The station later hired Chuck Moshontz, also from KLOS and paired him with Nicole to do mornings. After the first year, Sandler was promoted to Music Director. Others on the staff included Mimi Chen, Rich Guzmán, Terry Gladstone, Anita Gevinson and Merilee Kelly. The "KSCA Music Hall" (the hallway outside the deejay booth) hosted live performances by dozens of artists, some of whom had their debuts there before going on to superstardom, including the Dave Matthews Band.

The AAA format lasted until midnight on February 5, 1997, when Golden West Broadcasting sold off its last radio property. The last song on "FM 101.9" was "Her Majesty" by The Beatles, which was preceded by a brief monologue from general manager of KSCA, Bill Ward.

=== Switch to Spanish-language programming ===
KSCA was bought by the Heftel Broadcasting Corporation in February 1997 for $112.5 million. At 12:15 a.m. on February 5, the station signed off the air for about six hours; around 6:15 that evening, following a 12-hour loop of a laugh track, KSCA became "La Nueva 101.9," switching to a Spanish-language Ranchera music format, aimed at Los Angeles' growing Mexican-American population. At the time, Southern California only had a couple of full power FM stations broadcasting in Spanish; KLVE, airing a Latin Soft AC format, and KLAX-FM, which was also broadcasting Regional Mexican music.

KSCA's morning host, Eddie "Piolín" Sotelo, co-sponsored a large immigration rally in Los Angeles on March 25, 2006, along with other local radio personalities including KLAX's "El Cucuy" Renán Almendaríz. An estimated half-million protesters marched through Downtown Los Angeles. The morning show is now called "El Bueno, La Mala y El Feo" ("The Good, The Bad and The Ugly").

On September 16, 2011, KSCA rebranded as "LA 101.9". On March 1, 2016, the station rebranded again to "Zona MX 101.9". However, KSCA would return to the "LA 101.9" branding. On Sunday February 5, 2023, The Station Would Rebrand To LA Nueva 101.9, A tribute to the station when it first began in February 5, 1997.

In March 2019, KSCA joined the Uforia Audio Network, one of two networks owned by Univision. The current station on air hosts are; El Bueno, La Mala, y El Feo from 4AM-10AM, El Show Del Raton from 10AM-3PM, El Free-Guey Show from 3PM-7PM, Las Repegadas from 7PM-9PM, y DJ Christian from 9PM-12AM.
