= Willie Davis (defensive end) =

American football player (1934–2020)

- Davis with the Cleveland Browns in 1959

No. 77, 87
- Position: Defensive end

Personal information
- Born: July 24, 1934; Lisbon, Louisiana, U.S.
- Died: April 15, 2020 (aged 85); Santa Monica, California, U.S.
- Listed height: 6 ft 3 in (1.91 m)
- Listed weight: 243 lb (110 kg)

Career information
- High school: Booker T Washington (Texarkana, Arkansas)
- College: Grambling (1954–1957)
- NFL draft: 1956: 15th round, 181st overall pick

Career history
- Cleveland Browns (1958–1959); Green Bay Packers (1960–1969)

Awards and highlights
- 2× Super Bowl champion (I, II); 5× NFL champion (1961, 1962, 1965–1967); 5× First-team All-Pro (1962, 1964–1967); Second-team All-Pro (1963); 5× Pro Bowl (1963–1967); NFL 1960s All-Decade Team; NFF Distinguished American Award (1982); Green Bay Packers Hall of Fame

Career NFL statistics
- Fumbles recovered: 22
- Games played: 162
- Stats at Pro Football Reference
- Pro Football Hall of Fame

Willie Delford Davis (July 24, 1934 – April 15, 2020) was an American professional football player who was a defensive end in the National Football League (NFL). Davis played college football for the Grambling Tigers before being drafted 181st in the 1956 NFL draft. He spent 12 seasons in the NFL, playing for the Cleveland Browns and the Green Bay Packers.

In the NFL, Davis was a five-time champion, including winning the first two Super Bowls under Vince Lombardi. Individually, Davis was a six-time All-Pro, and was elected to the Pro Football Hall of Fame in 1981.

== College career ==
Davis attended college at Grambling State University, where he played football for the Tigers at both offensive tackle and defensive end.

== Professional career ==
Davis was selected the 181st overall pick in the 15th round of the 1956 NFL draft by the Cleveland Browns, but he did not start his career until the 1958 NFL season due to military service in the United States Army. Davis wore number 77 and played at various positions on both offense and defense for the Browns, before being traded to the Green Bay Packers in 1960.

Davis wore number 87 during his career with the Packers, where he was moved to a permanent position at defensive end by Vince Lombardi. For 10 seasons, Davis anchored the Packers' defensive line, playing 138 consecutive regular-season games and part of 162 regular-season games for his NFL career. Davis was a member of all five of Lombardi's NFL title-winning teams and played in Super Bowls I and II.

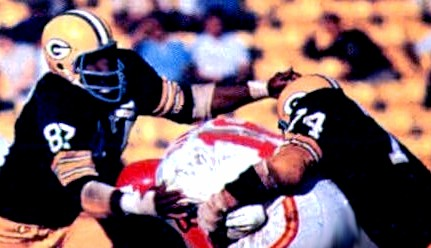
Davis (far left) in the first Super Bowl, 1967

Davis played in an era when neither tackles nor sacks were official statistics. However, John Turney, a member of the Professional Football Researchers Association, reports that Davis had in excess of 100 sacks during his 10-year Green Bay career (1960–69), "possibly more than 120," including a minimum of 40 over the 1963–65 seasons alone. Davis himself is quoted as saying, "I would think I would have to be the team's all-time leader in sacks. I played 10 years and I averaged in the 'teens' in sacks for those 10 years. I had 25 one season. [Paul] Hornung just reminded me of that the other day." Davis earned All-Pro honors 5 times (1962, 64–67). He was voted to the Pro Bowl five times (1963–67).

Davis recovered 22 opponents' fumbles over his Packers career, which, more than five decades after his retirement, remains a team record. The Packers honored his retirement with a Willie Davis Day on December 21, 1969. Davis served on the team's Board of Directors.

During his early years with the Packers, Davis along with other players, lived in the Hotel Northland. He often told the story about how he along with the visiting officials, CBS broadcasters and crew, etc. were awoken on the morning of the Ice Bowl by a wake-up call from the front desk announcing the time and that the temperature was 17 degrees below zero.

Davis was also credited with following Vince Lombardi's lead in having no one associated with the team treat any man differently regardless of race. Davis would intentionally take the leadership position to offer to have lunch and dinner with players that had never played on an integrated team or eaten at the same table with an African American. Davis proactively and positively ensured that they acclimated well to Lombardi's culture of inclusion.

== Later life and legacy ==
In the early 1970s, Davis worked as a color commentator on NFL telecasts for NBC. He was inducted into the Pro Football Hall of Fame in 1981. In 1986, Davis was named the Walter Camp Man of the Year. In 1987, he was given the Career Achievement Award from the NFL Alumni, and in 1988 he was elected to the Wisconsin Athletic Hall of Fame. In 1999, Davis was ranked number 69 on The Sporting News' list of the 100 Greatest Football Players. In 2021, he was listed as the 91st greatest player of all time by The Athletic.

Davis was a member of Kappa Alpha Psi fraternity. He received his Master of Business Administration (MBA) from the University of Chicago Booth School of Business in 1968. He was a member of the boards of Marquette University, Alliance Bank, Dow Chemical (1988–2006), Johnson Controls (1991–2006), K-Mart, LA Gear, Manpower (2001–2020), Metro-Goldwyn-Mayer (1999–2020), MGM Mirage, Rally's Inc., Sara Lee (1983–2020), Schlitz Brewing, and WICOR Inc. He was president of All-Pro Broadcasting, operators of radio stations KHTI, KATY-FM, WLDB-FM, WLUM-FM, and WZTI since 1976. In 1989 he was a finalist for the position of National Football League Commissioner.

Davis' son is actor Duane Davis, known for his role as "Featherstone" in Necessary Roughness. He has a daughter, Lori Davis, a lawyer known for her work in marijuana legislation within the Los Angeles children's court system. Davis' grandson, Wyatt Davis, was an All-American guard at the Ohio State University, and currently plays for the New York Giants. His granddaughter, Harley Ann Zepeda, is a beauty pageant queen who held the titles of Miss Los Angeles County United States 2024 and Miss Wisconsin United States 2024.

After being hospitalized for a month due to kidney failure, Davis died on April 15, 2020, at the age of 85.

During the 2020 season, the Green Bay Packers wore a helmet decal to honor Davis, featuring his name and number.
