= First Chicago Bank =

Former bank based in Chicago, Illinois

- Trade name: First Chicago Bank
- Formerly: First National Bank of Chicago
- Type: Bank
- Traded as: NYSE: FNB (1969–1995)
- Industry: Financial Services
- Founded: July 1, 1863; 163 years ago
- Founder: Edmund Aiken
- Defunct: December 1, 1995; 30 years ago (as an independent bank); May 17, 1999; 27 years ago (as a brand)
- Fate: Merged with NBD Bank (Note: First Chicago NBD Corporation operated under both the First Chicago Bank and NBD Bank names.) (1995); Acquired by Banc One Corporation (1998)
- Successor: Bank One (now Chase Bank)
- Headquarters: Chicago, Illinois
- Key people: Barry F. Sullivan (CEO)
- Products: Financial Services
- Brands: First Card
- Parent: First Chicago Corporation (1969–1995); First Chicago NBD Corporation (1995–1998); Bank One Corporation (1998–1999)
- Subsidiaries: FCC National Bank (Delaware)

First Chicago Bank was an American retail and commercial bank based in Chicago, Illinois. Its roots trace back to 1863, when it received one of the first charters under the then new National Bank Act. Over the years, the bank operated under several names including The First National Bank of Chicago and First Chicago NBD (following its 1995 merger with the former NBD Bank). In 1998, First Chicago NBD merged with Banc One Corporation to form Bank One Corporation, today a part of JPMorgan Chase.

== History ==
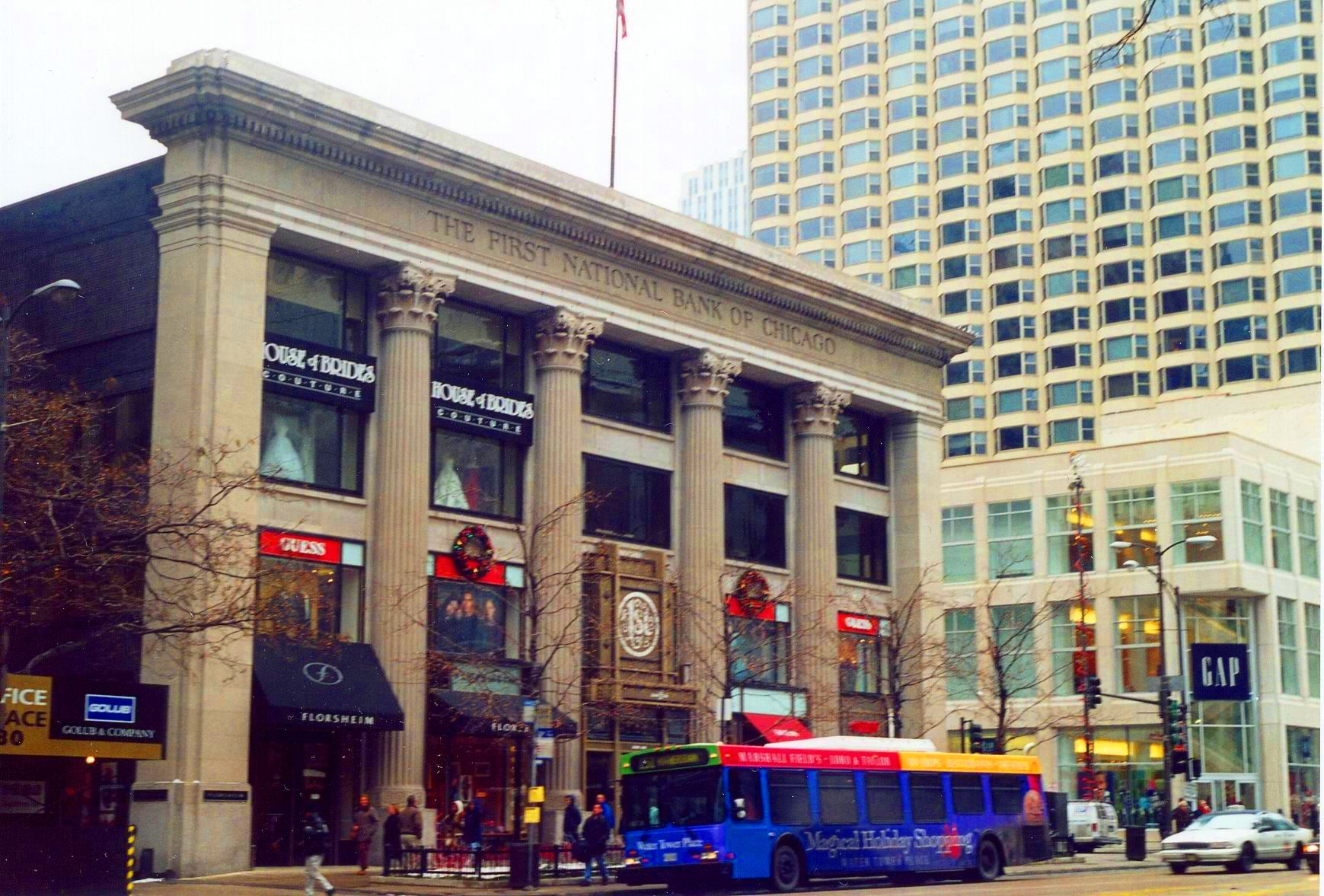
Former First National Bank of Chicago building, Michigan-Wacker Historic District, with a Bank One branch office in 2003

=== Founding and early history ===
On July 1, 1863, banker Edmund Aiken and his partners invested $100,000 to found a new federally chartered bank that could take advantage of the National Banking Act of 1863, which allowed national banks to exist along with state-chartered institutions for the first time. First Chicago received National Bank charter No. 8. The new bank known as The First National Bank of Chicago, or The First, grew steadily in the 1860s, financing the American Civil War.

The First merged with Union National Bank in 1900 and with the Metropolitan National Bank in 1902. At the beginning of the twentieth century, noted investors in the bank include J. Pierpont Morgan, James Stillman, Jacob H. Schiff, E. H. Harriman, and Marshall Field. In 1913, The First became a charter member of the Federal Reserve system. The First survived the depression, even acquiring Foreman State Banks in 1931 and was able to open its doors without regulatory delays following the National Bank Holiday of 1933.

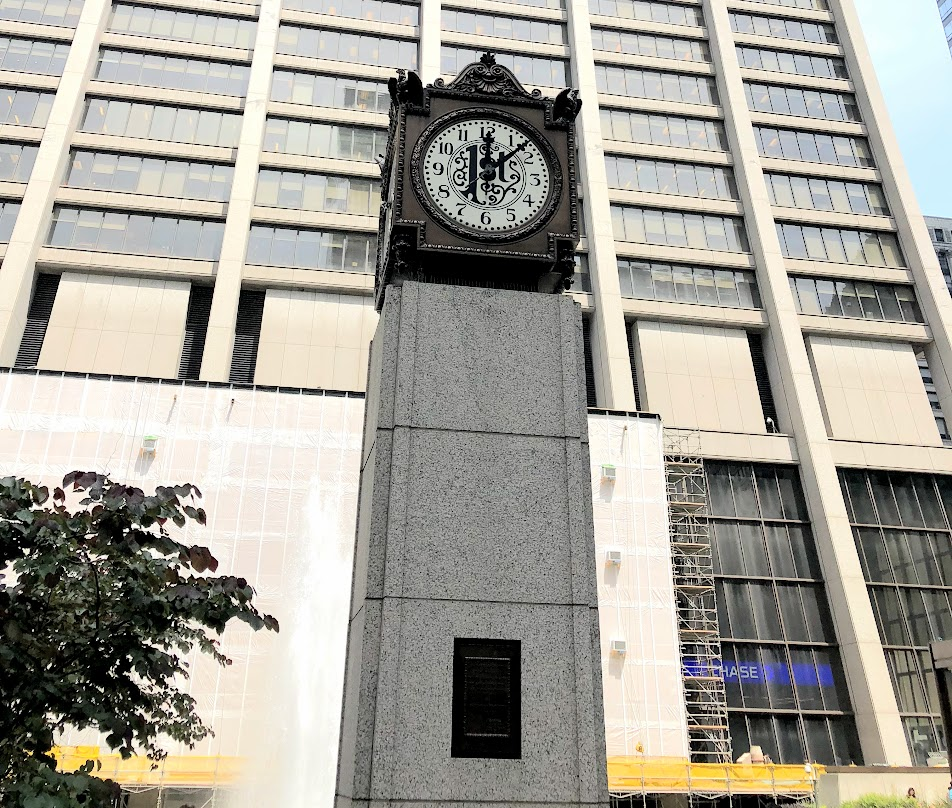
The First National clock is located at Exelon Plaza next to the Chase Tower in the Chicago Loop. The tower was called First National Plaza when it was built in 1969.

In 1903, the First opened the First Trust and Savings Bank which provided savings accounts to individual customers. First Trust and Savings Bank merged with Union Trust Company in 1928 to become the First Union Trust and Savings Bank. During the Great Depression, the First would absorb First Union Trust and Savings Bank's customers and operations. The bank was active in the sale of War Bonds during World War II. During the 1950s and 1960s the First expanded both in the Midwestern US as well as abroad, opening offices in London (1959), Tokyo (1962) and later Beijing (1980).

=== First Chicago ===
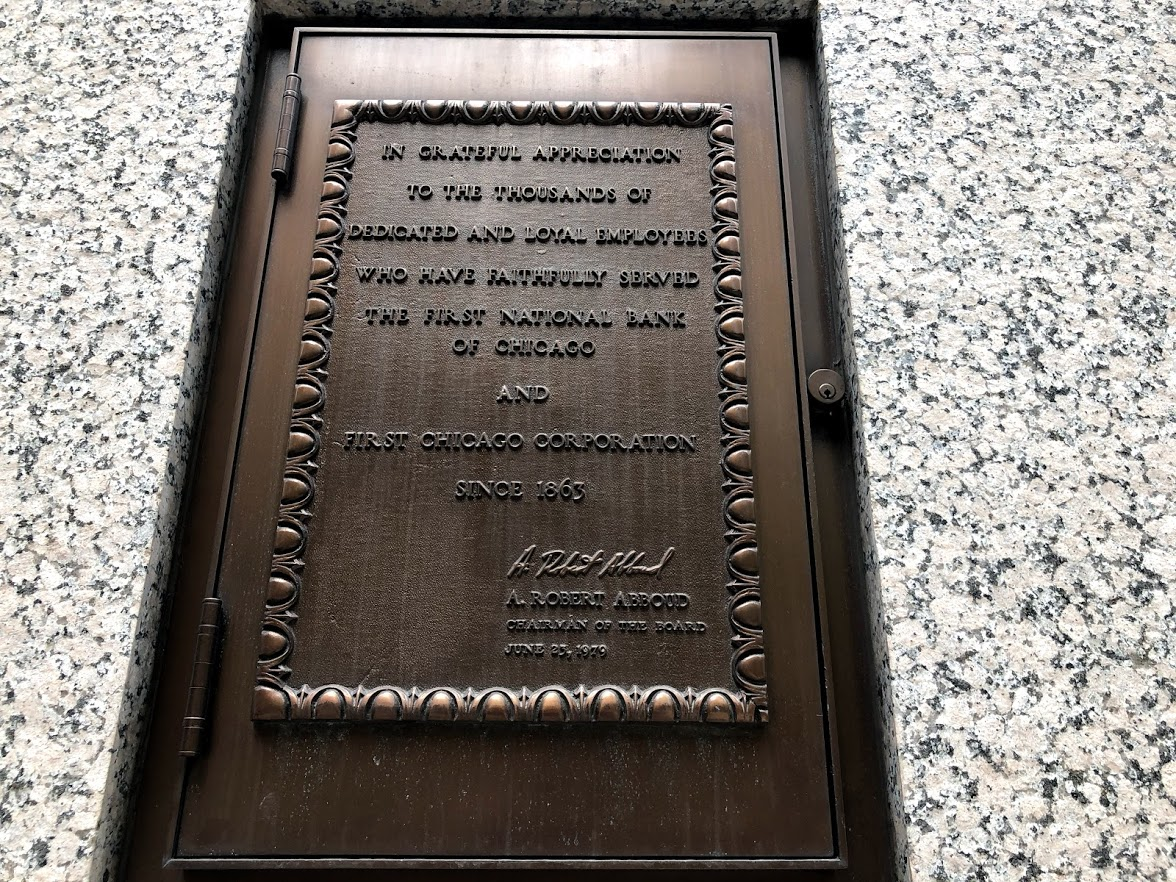
A plaque located below the clock next to the Chase Tower (originally First National Plaza). It was dedicated in 1979.

In 1969 the bank was reorganized as the primary subsidiary of the new First Chicago Corporation, a newly formed bank holding company. First Chicago was used as a brand name starting in 1969 and the bank moved into a new skyscraper in the Loop in Chicago (originally called First National Plaza, it is now known as Chase Tower). The bank grew consistently through the early 1970s, however, the bank's growth undermined its underwriting standards. By the end of 1975 and the beginning of 1976, non-performing loans at First Chicago had reached twice the national average for commercial banks at roughly 11% of all loans. Efforts to fix the bank failed and the bank struggled through the end of the 1970s, suffering from highly speculative bets on interest rates.

Expansion beyond a single retail banking location was hindered for years. Not only was Illinois one of the last states to allow branch banking, but for years it did not allow holding companies to own more than one bank. First Chicago was not able to open its first branch bank until 1977, when banks were allowed to open two limited banking facilities within 1,500 feet of the main office.

Unlike its rivals, First Chicago waited two years before making its first bank purchase after the Illinois legislature began to allow holding companies to own more than one bank in 1981. In 1984, First Chicago purchased American National Corporation, the holding company for American National Bank and Trust Company of Chicago, another bank located in the Loop, from Walter E. Heller International Corporation for $275 million.

==== Management ====
During the 1980s, CEO Barry F. Sullivan, formerly with Chase Manhattan Bank, was able to turn around the bank in the early 1980s. Additionally First Chicago's private equity operations proved highly successful and served the incubator for a number of successful independent private equity groups. Stanley Golder, who built the group in the 1970s left the bank in 1980 to found GTCR. In the 1990s, the team, led by John Canning Jr. would spin out of First Chicago to form private equity firm Madison Dearborn. Midwestern private equity firm, Primus Capital was also founded by First Chicago private equity alumni.

==== Expanding out of downtown and into the suburbs ====
First Chicago began to expand for the first time into the northwest suburbs of Chicago with the acquisition of the Arlington Heights-based First United Financial Services, a bank holding company with five banks, in 1987. The following year, First Chicago entered DuPage County by acquiring Gary-Wheaton Corp., another bank holding company.

In 1989, First Chicago acquired the north Chicago-based Ravenswood Financial Corp. for $55.1 million. Ravenswood Financial's only bank was renamed First Chicago Bank of Ravenswood. First Chicago also acquired the Winnetka-based Winnetka Bank for $21.6 million in stock.

In 1993, First Chicago acquired Lake Shore Bancorp, another Chicago-based bank holding company, $323 million.

Most of the acquired banks were named First Chicago Bank of followed by the name of the geographical location. Illinois law did not permit the merger of most of the acquired banks into the First National Bank of Chicago until as late as 1993.

==== Credit cards ====
To strengthen its credit card business, First Chicago acquired Delaware-based Beneficial National Bank USA in 1987 and renamed it FCC National Bank.

=== Bank One ===
First Chicago once again began to suffer from the quality of its loan portfolio in the early 1990s and sought out a merger with the NBD Bank, which at the time was the 18th largest bank in the US (First Chicago was the 10th largest bank). The $5 billion merger, completed in 1995, created First Chicago NBD Corporation, the 7th largest bank in the US with $72 billion of assets, and was also a leader in the issuance of credit cards. While NBD was the nominal survivor, the merged bank was headquartered in Chicago.

In April 1998 First Chicago NBD announced a $30 billion merger with Banc One Corporation of Columbus, Ohio. Bank One was also a leading issuer of credit cards through its First USA division. Following the merger, the company was renamed Bank One Corporation, headquartered in Chicago. The First Chicago and NBD names were retired in 1999. In 2004, Bank One Corporation merged into JPMorgan Chase & Co. and its subsidiary bank, then named Bank One, National Association, merged into JPMorgan Chase Bank, National Association.

== Other notes ==
- Lyman J. Gage – Secretary of the Treasury under William McKinley and Theodore Roosevelt was a former bank president, who ascended the organization after beginning as a cashier
- In 1882, The First became the first bank to open a women's banking department, to attract female customers.
- In 1899, The First established a corporate pension plan, the first bank to do so in the U.S.

== See also ==
- Bank One Corporation
- JPMorgan Chase
- Chase Bank
- Madison Dearborn
- National Bank of Detroit (NBD)
- Waid Vanderpoel
