= KABE-CD =

Television station in Bakersfield, California

- Bakersfield, California; United States
- Channels: Digital: 35 (UHF); Virtual: 39
- Branding: Univision 39; Noticias 39 (newscasts); Noticias 21 (during newscast simulcasts)

Programming
- Affiliations: 39.1: Univision

Ownership
- Owner: TelevisaUnivision; (Univision Bakersfield LLC)
- Sister stations: KUVI-DT, KBTF-CD

History
- First air date: July 31, 1989
- Former call signs: K52DJ (1989–1998); KSUV-LP (1998–2002); KBTF-LP (2002–2004); KABE-LP (2004–2010); KABE-LD (2010–2013)
- Former channel numbers: Analog: 52 (UHF, 1989–1998), 39 (UHF, 1998–2010); Digital: 39 (UHF, 2010–2019)
- Former affiliations: Univision (via KFTV, 1989–2002); TeleFutura (2002–2004)
- Call sign meaning: "Aquí en Bakersfield Estamos"

Technical information
- Licensing authority: FCC
- Facility ID: 18747
- Class: CD
- ERP: 13 kW
- HAAT: 385 m (1,263 ft)
- Transmitter coordinates: 35°26′16.75″N 118°44′27.39″W
- Translator(s): KUVI-DT 45.2 Bakersfield

Links
- Public license information: Public file; LMS
- Website: Univision Bakersfield

KABE-CD (channel 39) is a low-power, Class A television station in Bakersfield, California, United States, broadcasting the Spanish-language network Univision. It is owned and operated by TelevisaUnivision alongside Class A UniMás outlet KBTF-CD (channel 31) and Quest affiliate KUVI-DT (channel 45). The three stations share studios at the Univision Broadcast Center on Truxtun Avenue in the western section of Bakersfield; KABE-CD's transmitter is located atop Mount Adelaide.

In addition to its own digital signal, KABE-CD is simulcast in high definition on KUVI's second digital subchannel (45.2) from a separate transmitter atop Mount Adelaide.

== History ==
K52DJ launched on July 31, 1989, as a translator of Fresno's Univision station KFTV. It was renamed KSUV-LP and moved to channel 39 in 1998 after Univision purchased UPN affiliate KUZZ-TV (now KUVI-DT) from Buck Owens. It was renamed to KBTF-LP in 2002 during the launch of TeleFutura (now UniMás). It was renamed to KABE-LP in 2004 after a callsign swap with the original KABE-CA (channel 31, now KBTF-CD). In 2013, the station obtained Class A status. In 2019, KABE started airing Court TV on its second digital subchannel as part of an agreement between Scripps and Univision for areas where KERO-TV's signal is not easily received.

== Subchannel ==
Subchannel of KABE-CD
Channel	Res.	Short name	Programming
39.1	720p	KABE-CD	Univision

The True Crime Network affiliation was dropped on September 25, 2017, two weeks after KUVI obtained the affiliation; the 39.2 subchannel went dark until 2019, when it returned to the air with Court TV programming. The Court TV affiliation was dropped in 2021.
