= Rollup =

Investment process where small companies are acquired and merged

A rollup (also "roll-up" or "roll up") is a process used by investors (commonly private equity firms) where multiple small companies in the same market are acquired and merged.

The principal aim of a rollup is to reduce costs through economies of scale. It also has the effect of increasing the valuation multiples the business can command as it acquires greater scale. Rollups may also have the effect of rationalizing competition in crowded and fragmented markets, where there are often many small participants but room for only a few to succeed.

An investor faced with an opportunity to invest in two competing companies may reduce risk by simply investing in both and merging them. Rollups are often part of the shakeout and consolidation process during an economic downturn or as new market sectors begin to mature.

The characteristics that can make a rollup particularly attractive come into play especially when there are many small players in a fragmented market or in fields where technology can play a role in revitalizing industries with small margins. The other reason companies do rollups is due to the higher earnings multiple achievable in businesses with large scale, compared to smaller mom and pop operations which remain vulnerable to changing markets and poor access to capital markets.

Rollups of complementary or unrelated companies are also done to:

- Build a full-capability company, when it would be too costly or time-consuming to develop the missing pieces through internal expansion.
- Blending companies have different financial metrics, often to make the combined company attractive for investment, mergers and acquisitions, or an initial public offering.

== History ==
Rollups are almost as old as modern commerce, with some early capitalists persuading their competitors to sell out. The trend reached a peak during the 19th century era of the robber barons, when people like Andrew Carnegie were consolidating heavy industry and John D. Rockefeller was aggregating the oil industry. James Buchanan Duke bought so many manufacturers that at one point he was controlling 80% of the tobacco business in the US and a huge share of the international trade. These monopolistic attempts concerned authorities and led to a series of anti-trust laws and measures in the early 20th century.

Kraft Foods (now renamed Mondelēz International), created in 1923, was an important rollup in the food industry.

Waste Management was the most notable rollup during the 1970s and 1980s. Waste Management's acquisition of 133 small-time haulers quickly became the largest waste disposal company in the US. AutoNation was also a rollup effort in the car dealership space spearheaded by Wayne Huizenga, founder of Waste Management.

From 2008 to 2014, Valeant Pharmaceuticals International acquired over 100 companies in a rollup.

== See also ==
- Ideal firm size
- Economies of scale
