= Synova =

Private equity firm

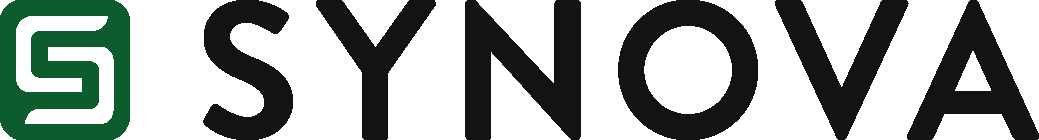
- Type: Limited liability partnership
- Industry: Private equity, venture capital
- Founded: 2007
- Founders: David Menton; Philip Shapiro
- Headquarters: London, United Kingdom
- Area served: United Kingdom
- Products: Venture capital, private equity funds, equity investment, management buy-in, management buyout, growth capital
- AUM: £2 billion
- Website: www.synova.pe

Synova is a growth focused investor supporting European companies valued between £20m and £250m. The firm manages £1.7bn of capital on behalf of institutional investors and family offices and invests across three interrelated sectors: Software & Data, Tech Enabled Services and Financial Services. Synova partners with founders and managers to accelerate growth and drive exceptional returns. Synova is currently investing across the full mid-market spectrum from its £875m fifth fund, raised in 2022, which includes a dedicated £250m pool of capital, Chrysalis, to support smaller growth companies.

The firm was named Private Equity House of the Year at the 2025, 2022 and 2020 Private Equity Awards and House of the Year at the 2022 and 2019 British Private Equity Awards. According to Preqin in 2024 Synova's returns place the firm as Europe's top performing private equity fund.

Synova was founded in 2007 by its managing partners, David Menton and Philip Shapiro. Synova's other partners include Alex Bowden, Daniel Silverton-Parker, Zachary Tsai, Sunil Jain and Ben Snow.

Synova's 2007 Fund I was fully realised in 2018 generating a 4x return for investors. Synova's £110m 2013 Fund II has now returned 3.5x its total invested capital. Synova closed its 2016 third fund at £250m which is performing strongly with 4x its total invested capital returned to date. Synova closed its 2019 fourth fund at its £365m hard cap and its 2022 Fund V at its £875m hard cap.

Notable exits include the sale of Kinapse to Hg Capital generating a 16x return, the sale of Tonic Games to Epic Games for a 9x return and 200% IRR, the sale of Mandata for a 8x return and the sale of Mintec to Five Arrows Principal Investments for a 12x return. Synova’s average return on realised investments exceeds 6x invested capital.

== Current and past investments by year and sector^{1} ==
Company	Year of investment	Return	Sector
dbg	2010 - Exited 2013	5.8x	Tech Enabled Services
Kinapse	2012 - Exited 2016	16.1x	Tech Enabled Services
Mandata	2013 - Exited 2018	8.0x	Software & Data
MK Test	2014 - Exited 2024	3.0x	Tech Enabled Services
Stackhouse Poland	2014 - Exited 2019	5.6x	Financial Services
Defaqto	2015 - Exited 2019	3.9x	Software & Data
Merit Software	2015 - Exited 2019	4.0x	Software & Data
4Ways	2015 - Exited 2018	6.0x	Tech Enabled Services
Vistair	2015 - Exited 2023	6.5x	Software & Data
Fairstone^{2}	2016 - Exited 2021	4.5x	Financial Services
Avantra	2017- Exited 2024	4.5x	Software & Data
AllClear	2018 - Exited 2024	7.3x	Financial Services
Expana	2018 - Exited 2022	12.0x	Software & Data
Pacifica	2019		Tech Enabled Services
Tonic Games	2019 - Exited 2021	9.0x	Software & Data
JMG Group^{2}	2020 - Exited 2025	5.6x	Financial Services
Orbis Protect	2021 - Exited 2026	3.2x	Tech Enabled Services
DM Financial^{2}	2021 - Exited 2026	4.7x	Tech Enabled Services
National Education Group	2021		Software & Data
Unity5	2022		Software & Data
3173	2022		Financial Services
Kinexio	2022		Software & Data
Learnlight	2023		Tech Enabled Services
Synectics Solutions	2024		Software & Data
Mecsia	2024		Tech Enabled Services
Bishop Fleming	2025		Tech Enabled Services
Klearcom	2025		Software & Data
Avendis	2025		Tech Enabled Services
netIP	2026		Tech Enabled Services

^{1} Synova sector focus , ^{2} Synova reinvestment
