= KBTF-CD =

Television station in Bakersfield, California

- Bakersfield, California; United States
- Channels: Digital: 31 (UHF); Virtual: 31
- Branding: UniMás 31

Programming
- Affiliations: 31.1: UniMás; for others, see § Subchannels

Ownership
- Owner: TelevisaUnivision; (UniMas Bakersfield LLC)
- Sister stations: KUVI-DT, KABE-CD

History
- Founded: October 31, 1980
- First air date: May 31, 1988
- Former call signs: K39AB (1988–1995); KABE-LP (1995–2002); KABE-CA (2002–2004); KBTF-CA (2004–2011)
- Former channel number: Analog: 39 (UHF, 1988–1998), 31 (UHF, 1998–2015)
- Former affiliations: Univision (1988–2004)
- Call sign meaning: Bakersfield Telefutura (reflecting network's former branding)

Technical information
- Licensing authority: FCC
- Facility ID: 34438
- ERP: 14.2 kW
- HAAT: 385.5 m (1,265 ft)
- Transmitter coordinates: 35°26′16.75″N 118°44′27.39″W

Links
- Public license information: Public file; LMS

KBTF-CD (channel 31) is a low-power, Class A television station in Bakersfield, California, United States, broadcasting the Spanish-language UniMás network. It is owned and operated by TelevisaUnivision alongside Class A Univision outlet KABE-CD (channel 39) and Quest affiliate KUVI-DT (channel 45). The three stations share studios at the Univision Broadcast Center on Truxtun Avenue in the western section of Bakersfield; KBTF-CD's transmitter is located atop Mount Adelaide.

In addition to its own digital signal, KBTF-CD is simulcast in high definition on the third digital subchannel of KUVI (45.3) from a separate transmitter atop Mount Adelaide.

== History ==
Univision acquired the channel 39 license for Bakersfield during 1980. During the station's first years when it began broadcasting on the day after Memorial Day in 1988, it would be named as "Univision 39 K39AB" because it served as a translator for KFTV. Univision later moved the frequency to channel 31 in 1998 and it was renamed KABE-LP. It served as a repeater for KSUV-LP (channel 39, now KABE-CD) and was co-branded as "KSUV Univision 39 & KABE 31". KSUV-LP became a charter station of TeleFutura (now UniMás) when it was launched in 2002 and was renamed "KBTF-LP TeleFutura 39". Univision remained on channel 31 branded as "KABE Univision 31". In 2004, the station swapped callsigns with KBTF-LP and became the new KABE-LP while TeleFutura moved to channel 31. During 2014 the station obtained Class A status.

== Subchannels ==
The station's signal is multiplexed:

Subchannels of KBTF-CD
Channel	Res.	Short name	Programming
31.1	720p	KBTF-CD	UniMás
31.2	480i	KBTF-CD	Great (4:3)
31.3	480i	KBTF-CD	Ion Mystery
