= KMBC-TV =

Television station in Kansas City, Missouri

- Kansas City, Missouri; United States
- Channels: Digital: 29 (UHF); Virtual: 9
- Branding: KMBC 9

Programming
- Affiliations: 9.1: ABC; for others, see § Subchannels

Ownership
- Owner: Hearst Television; (Hearst Stations Inc.)
- Sister stations: KCWE

History
- First air date: August 2, 1953
- Former call signs: WHB-TV (shared operation, 1953–1954)
- Former channel numbers: Analog: 9 (VHF, 1953–2009); Digital: 7 (VHF, 2002–2009)
- Former affiliations: CBS (1953–1955)
- Call sign meaning: Midland Broadcasting Company, founding owners

Technical information
- Licensing authority: FCC
- Facility ID: 65686
- ERP: 1,000 kW
- HAAT: 358 m (1,175 ft)
- Transmitter coordinates: 39°5′1″N 94°30′58″W

Links
- Public license information: Public file; LMS
- Website: www.kmbc.com

KMBC-TV (channel 9) is a television station in Kansas City, Missouri, United States, affiliated with ABC. It is owned by Hearst Television alongside CW affiliate KCWE (channel 29). The two stations share studios on Winchester Avenue near Swope Park in southeast Kansas City, Missouri; KMBC-TV's transmitter is located at 23rd Street and Topping Avenue, east of downtown in the Blue Valley area.

Channel 9 began broadcasting on August 2, 1953. For the first ten months, two stations operated on the channel: KMBC-TV, associated with KMBC radio, and WHB-TV, the television adjunct of WHB radio. The stations had separate studios and staffs, alternating every 90 minutes on the air, but shared transmitter facilities and an affiliation with CBS. The two stations were combined in 1954 when Cook Paint and Varnish Company, owner of WHB radio and television, bought out KMBC radio and television and retained the KMBC facilities and designation. In 1955, a multi-market affiliation switch by the Meredith Publishing Company forced KMBC-TV to switch from CBS to ABC.

Metromedia acquired the KMBC stations in 1961, selling KMBC radio off in 1967. Under Metromedia, KMBC-TV became a competitive station in the market, at first in non-news programming—where its offerings sometimes resembled one of Metromedia's own independent stations—and later in news in the 1970s. This began to change at the end of the decade, as KCMO-TV (now KCTV) mounted a ratings challenge, and one of Metromedia's last substantive decisions as owner of the station was a watershed. In 1981, KMBC-TV fired anchorwoman Christine Craft after seven months on the air, claiming negative audience acceptance. Believing she was fired because of her looks, which the news director did not like, Craft sued Metromedia in a highly watched sex discrimination case; while she ultimately lost, the trial embarrassed KMBC-TV, whose manager testified that appearance was "at the top of the list" of qualities desired in a news anchor, and spotlighted the unequal treatment of women in TV news.

KMBC-TV was sold to Hearst in 1981 to make room for Metromedia's purchase of WCVB-TV in Boston. The news department, which had initially weathered the loss of Craft in the ratings, fell to third place. In the late 1980s, under general manager Dino Dinovitz, the station orchestrated a turnaround, commanding a news ratings lead in the market throughout the 1990s. KMBC-TV began programming channel 29 in 1996. In 2007, the stations moved out of their longtime home—the historic Lyric Theatre building—and to their present studios in southeast Kansas City. KMBC continues to compete for first place in local news ratings.

== History ==
=== Share-time operation with WHB-TV and early years ===
Kansas City, Missouri, radio station KMBC was the fourth to apply to the Federal Communications Commission (FCC) for permission to establish a television station, filing for channel 9 in January 1948. A second application for the channel was received in June from the 20th Century-Fox movie studio; 20th Century-Fox had five applications pending at the FCC—for stations in Boston, Kansas City, St. Louis, San Francisco, and Seattle—by July 1948. The FCC held up all of 20th Century Fox's applications while it investigated recent antitrust findings against it and other studios. The company withdrew all five applications in January 1950 to focus on applications for TV in theaters. By that time, all new television station grants were frozen by the commission. Also applying prior to the 1948 freeze was Kansas City radio station WHB, which initially sought channel 5 along with KCMO and the New England Television Company. The FCC lifted the freeze in April 1952, by which time KMBC and KCKN in Kansas City, Kansas, both sought channel 9. By September, KCKN had switched its application to channel 5 and WHB to channel 9.

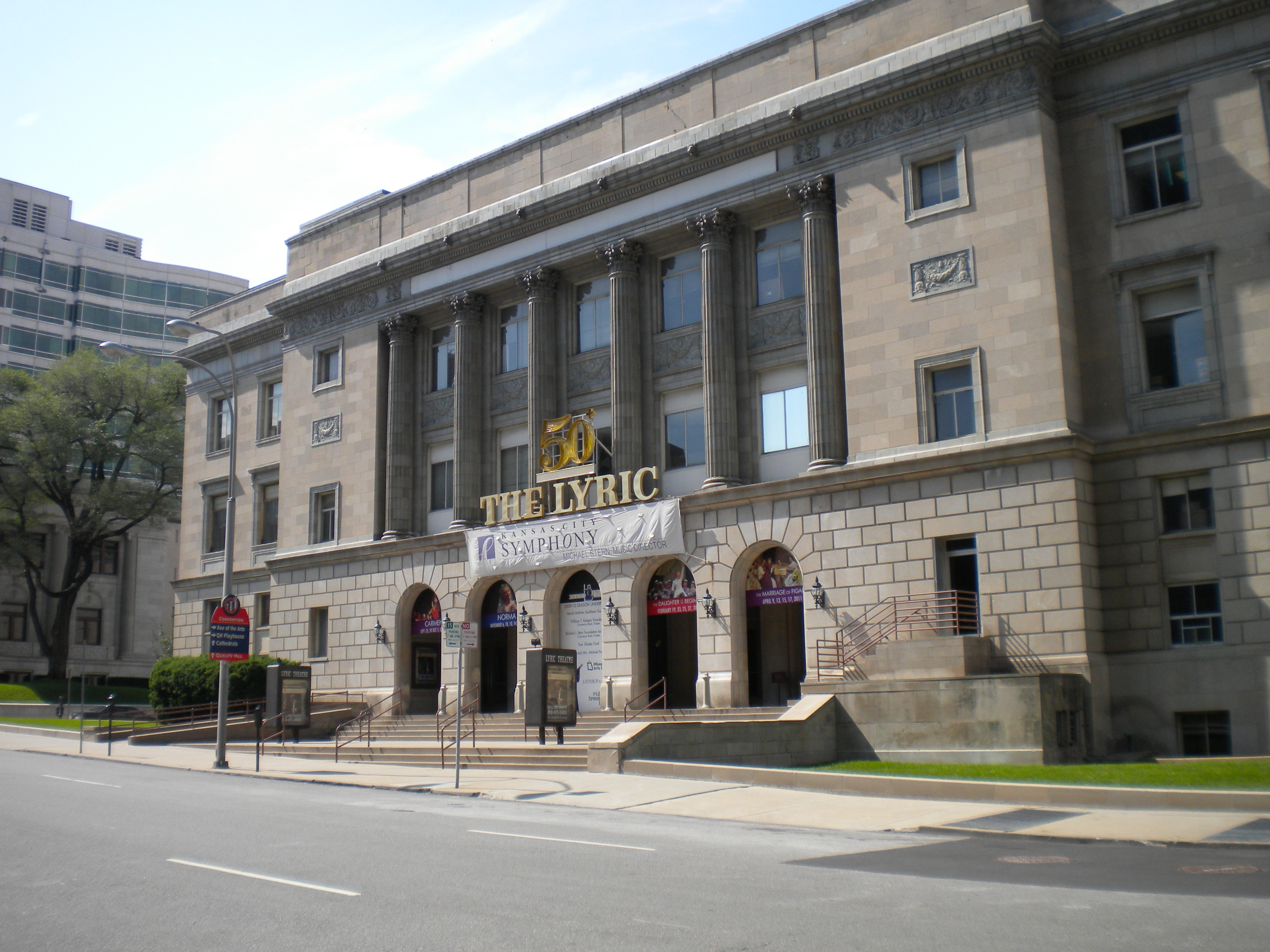
The Lyric Theatre building, known by other names prior to 1974, housed KMBC-TV from its start until 2007.

Facing the possibility of a lengthy hearing delaying either party getting a station on the air, in June 1953, KMBC and WHB asked the commission to let them share time on channel 9, with alternating schedules. The FCC granted construction permits to both stations on June 25, 1953. KMBC-TV and WHB-TV would share an affiliation with CBS—KMBC radio was the sixth-oldest CBS affiliate—as well as a transmitter facility, at first atop the Kansas City Power and Light Building and later a jointly financed facility at 23rd Street and Topping. However, KMBC-TV and WHB-TV would each have their own studios; KMBC originated from the Playhouse at 11th and Central streets, while WHB-TV used temporary facilities on the 26th or 30th floor of the Power and Light Building. Channel 9 began broadcasting on August 2, 1953, with a CBS network program broadcast from KMBC-TV. The two stations alternated presenting the programs throughout the day. With a full-time CBS affiliate, many new CBS programs were seen in Kansas City, while WDAF-TV relinquished its CBS programs and replaced them with shows from its primary network, NBC. KMBC-TV and WHB-TV were the first share-time stations in the United States to go into service, though there had been proposals in other communities. The stations jointly promoted themselves as "channel 9" and had to liaise on efforts from news to promotion to avoid duplication. WHB-TV employees found themselves going back and forth between the studio and the Scarritt Building, which housed WHB radio; the company paid for an hourly shuttle service but hoped to build a common facility for WHB radio and television at some other site.

Cook Paint and Varnish Company, the owner of WHB, agreed in April 1954 to purchase KMBC radio and television from Midland Broadcasting Company, retain the KMBC stations and their studio facility, and sell WHB radio to the Mid-Continent Broadcasting Company of Omaha, Nebraska. A driving factor in the transaction was the share-time situation on channel 9. The principals of Cook and Midland issued a joint statement reading, "We have learned that shared-time operation of a television channel can be successfully accomplished, but we have learned also that the difficulties of such shared time can be eliminated by one ownership." On June 13, 1954, channel 9 became solely KMBC-TV; WHB-TV's staff and equipment were folded into the expanded operation, and the Power and Light Building studio was closed. In November 1954, the final transmitter facility was activated, bringing KMBC-TV's effective radiated power to the maximum of 316,000 watts and improving reception of the station.

In January 1955, the Meredith Publishing Company, owner of KCMO-TV (channel 5, now KCTV), reached a group affiliation deal with CBS covering most of its radio and television properties. The agreement saw KCMO radio and television become CBS secondary outlets with immediate effect. The news was received, per a report in Variety, with "puzzlement" in Kansas City, given KMBC's long association with CBS. KCMO-TV joined CBS and KMBC-TV joined ABC on September 28, 1955, with their radio counterparts exchanging affiliations on December 1.

Cook Paint acquired KDRO-TV (channel 6), an ABC affiliate in Sedalia, Missouri, in 1958. The call sign was changed to KMOS-TV on February 6, 1959. Cook operated KMOS-TV as a semi-satellite of KMBC-TV, simulcasting the Kansas City station about 40% of the time. The Kansas City studio building became home to the Victoria Theater and was converted to the Capri, a movie house, in 1959. It also housed other offices and a restaurant.

=== Metromedia ownership ===
Cook Paint announced on December 23, 1960, that it was selling KMBC radio and television to the Metropolitan Broadcasting Corporation for $10.25 million. Metropolitan did not retain KMOS-TV, which was concurrently sold to Jefferson Television Company, owner of KRCG in Jefferson City. The sales marked Cook Paint's exit from broadcasting after 30 years to focus on its paint manufacturing business. The transactions closed in August 1961, with Metropolitan Broadcasting having renamed itself Metromedia the preceding April. Under Metromedia and new general manager Al Krivin, the station moved from a third-place position locally to a slight first-place lead by 1963. KMBC-TV began presenting local programming in color in 1966. In 1967, the KMBC radio stations were spun off to Bonneville International Corporation, with KMBC AM changing its call sign to the similar-sounding KMBZ.

In its early years under Metromedia ownership, KMBC-TV was a comparatively high pre-empter of ABC network programs. Writing for Variety in 1963, Les Brown noted that KMBC-TV had 14 of the market's top 15 syndicated programs, reportedly owned "as much as syndicated film as an independent [station], and reputedly programs in the manner of an indie". This was particularly apt for Metromedia, which had become known as a quality operator of major-market independent stations. In 1968, Variety's Bill Greeley reported that one Metromedia sales executive had recommended to his bosses that the station drop its network affiliation, while some speculated that Metromedia could trade with Cox Broadcasting for its independent in Oakland, California, KTVU, giving Metromedia another independent and Cox another network affiliate. In 1969, Ellis Shook moved from Metromedia's WTTG in Washington, D.C., to run KMBC-TV. He put an end to the independent-style programming and pre-emptions while launching a series of new local programs: Dimensions in Black and the talk show Etcetera. During his tenure, KMBC began airing the ABC Evening News, which previously had not aired in Kansas City. In 1980, when ABC debuted the late-night newscast Nightline, KMBC-TV delayed it to show reruns after its late newscast; this practice of deferring ABC's late-night programming lasted until January 2015.

The theater inside the KMBC building was used by the Kansas City Lyric Theatre beginning in 1970 and renamed the Lyric Theatre in 1974.

=== Hearst ownership ===
Metromedia agreed to buy WCVB-TV in Boston in 1981 for $220 million, then the single most expensive TV station sale in history. FCC ownership rules of the time limited one station group to five VHF TV stations; Metromedia was already at the maximum and needed to sell one, with speculation leaning toward a sale of KMBC-TV over WTCN-TV in Minneapolis. The Hearst Corporation agreed to purchase KMBC for $79 million that September, representing the second-most expensive single-station sale. Hearst sold the studio building to the Lyric organization in 1991, a year and a half after damage closed the theater, with the goal of eventually moving KMBC-TV to another space. KMBC was the broadcaster of Kansas City Chiefs preseason football from 1989 through 1996.

Hearst helped put a new Kansas City TV station on the air on September 14, 1996. KCWB (channel 29), an affiliate of The WB, was programmed by the company under a local marketing agreement. A month after launching, KMBC and KCWB obtained rights to Kansas City Royals baseball in a 50-game agreement sublicensed from Fox Sports Rocky Mountain; 15 games were slated for airing on channel 9. After an affiliation exchange with KSMO-TV (channel 62) in 1998, KCWB became KCWE, a UPN affiliate. It affiliated with The CW in 2006, the same year Hearst-Argyle (Note: Hearst merged its broadcast division with Argyle Television in 1997, forming Hearst-Argyle Television. The name continued until 2009, when the Hearst Corporation acquired Argyle's stake in the venture, took it private, and renamed it Hearst Television.) was approved to buy it outright, creating Kansas City's third duopoly.

In 2007, KMBC and KCWE moved from the downtown studios into a 53,000-square-foot (4,900 m^{2}) facility at the Winchester Business Center, near Swope Park in southeastern Kansas City, Missouri. The facility, five years in the planning and under construction since 2005, was designed after the buildings at Country Club Plaza. It enabled the KMBC–KCWE operation to operate more efficiently. Prior to the relocation, offices spilled out from the Lyric into an annex across the street. It also offered a helipad and secure parking, unlike the Lyric.

== News operation ==
In the early 1960s, KMBC had the smallest news staff in Kansas City television yet contended in the ratings, which showed volatility based on lead-in and lead-out programs. The station instituted an hour of early evening news in 1973, consisting of two local half-hours at 5 and 6 p.m. wrapped around the ABC Evening News, and added another local half-hour the next year—only for a bad economy and poor ratings of ABC to force the station back into a half-hour early-evening newscast after one year. Meanwhile, at 10 p.m., the station's Total News challenged KCMO-TV for first place, with a stronger performance among younger viewers. Retrospectively, the KMBC news operation in the mid-1970s was seen as a "news giant" at the top of its game.

In 1977, Ridge Shannon took over as KMBC-TV's news director. Over the next few years, the station experienced a near-total turnover in news personnel as people were fired or, as in the case of anchor Larry Moore, took jobs elsewhere. KMBC fell in the ratings and lost a third of its audience share at 10 p.m. in two years with new anchor Scott Feldman. In January 1980, the Total News moniker was dropped and replaced with The News, in a format that utilized beat reporting and aimed to present more substantive stories. Three months later, Don Fortune—sports director since 1975 and last remaining member of the top-rated Total News anchor team of the 1970s—departed to work for KCMO.

=== Christine Craft ===
In January 1981, Shannon hired newscaster Christine Craft from KEYT in Santa Barbara, California, to team with Feldman on the weeknight editions of The News. Craft had been hired because the consultants that advised KMBC-TV had circulated an audition tape of her, and their research showed that Feldman—seen as solid but somewhat harsh—needed a female co-anchor as a counterpart. Craft's tenure as co-anchor lasted seven months before Shannon moved to demote her to reporter on August 14. This came after research from the same firm claimed that Kansas Citians had rejected Craft, finding her old and unattractive; she had been kept only on the insistence of following a fashion consultant's advice on clothes and makeup, which included a "fashion calendar" prescribing her outfits by day. Craft refused the demotion and was fired. News of Craft's firing shocked her counterparts at competing stations, who believed that KMBC had not given Craft enough time to establish herself on the air. WDAF-TV's Cynthia Smith noted, "To me, this is scary for all women in broadcasting." The reasoning was also belied by the ratings: while the Arbitron survey showed KMBC in second place at 10 p.m., Nielsen showed KMBC in the lead at 6 and 10 for the first time in nearly three years. The station continued to be number-one in the news ratings in 1982, with Craft's replacement: Brenda Williams, the first Black weeknight anchor in Kansas City.

Channel 9 became known by many in the national broadcast industry as the station that gave local newscasts a bad name. It became known as the station that put appearance before journalistic integrity.

— Barry Garron, The Kansas City Star

Craft returned to Santa Barbara, working for half the salary she earned in Kansas City. She sued Metromedia—but not Hearst or KMBC-TV itself—in January 1983, seeking $1.2 million in damages and alleging a pattern of sex discrimination at Metromedia. Testifying in the trial, KMBC general manager R. Kent Replogle stated that appearance was "at the top of the list" of qualities desired in a news anchor. He noted that Arbitron—which showed KMBC in a worse ratings position than Nielsen—was how the station sold 90 percent of its advertising. Two juries awarded Craft monetary damages, but the verdicts against Metromedia were overturned, first by a judge and later by the United States Court of Appeals for the Eighth Circuit.

While Craft lost, the trial spotlighted the double standards faced by women in TV news. Columnists such as Ellen Goodman of The Boston Globe and Sally Bedell Smith in The New York Times grappled with the questions the trial posed about how the television industry treated women journalists. It also was damaging to KMBC-TV and to the industry. In a letter to the editor of Broadcasting, David Dary, a professor at the University of Kansas, claimed the trial "singed the image of professionalism of TV news" by exposing the behind-the-scenes maneuvering involved.

=== Rebuilding ===
We were the 28th largest market at the time, but we could've been 128th. We didn't have a news truck, didn't have a live truck.

— Russ Mitchell, on his days at KMBC-TV, 1982–1985, to Aaron Barnhart of The Kansas City Star

When Hearst took over, it found itself hamstrung by poor decisions made in the late Metromedia era, particularly under Ridge Shannon. While KMBC-TV itself had not been sued by Craft, the long-term impact of the Craft saga tarnished the station's image and hurt talent recruitment. Shannon resigned in April 1983, shortly before ratings surveys that showed KMBC was in third at 6 p.m. and either third or second at 10 p.m. Replogle ordered major changes in the news staff; he rehired Larry Moore, who had worked in San Francisco and Chicago after leaving KMBC. Moore was reluctant to return, telling the news director, "Your crisis is so severe, I don't think I want to get involved." Simultaneously, Hearst increased its news budget, enabling the smallest news staff in Kansas City to grow. But ratings did not immediately increase, as KMBC remained behind KCTV and a revitalized WDAF, struggled with ABC's poor national ratings, and lacked a news identity of its own.

In 1985, Hearst hired former Kansas Citian Paul "Dino" Dinovitz as KMBC-TV's new general manager. At the time, KMBC was in third place in local news ratings at 5, 6, and 10 p.m. Things had not changed by January 1987, when Brian Bracco was hired as news director. Under Bracco, KMBC added a 6:30 a.m. newscast, the first in Kansas City. Ratings rose to levels not seen since 1984, and in October 1989, KMBC regained first place at 10 p.m. By the early 1990s, ratings showed KMBC in the lead in all three evening news time slots. In November 1994, its 10 p.m. audience share reached 34 percent, tied for its best in 15 years.

=== 21st century ===
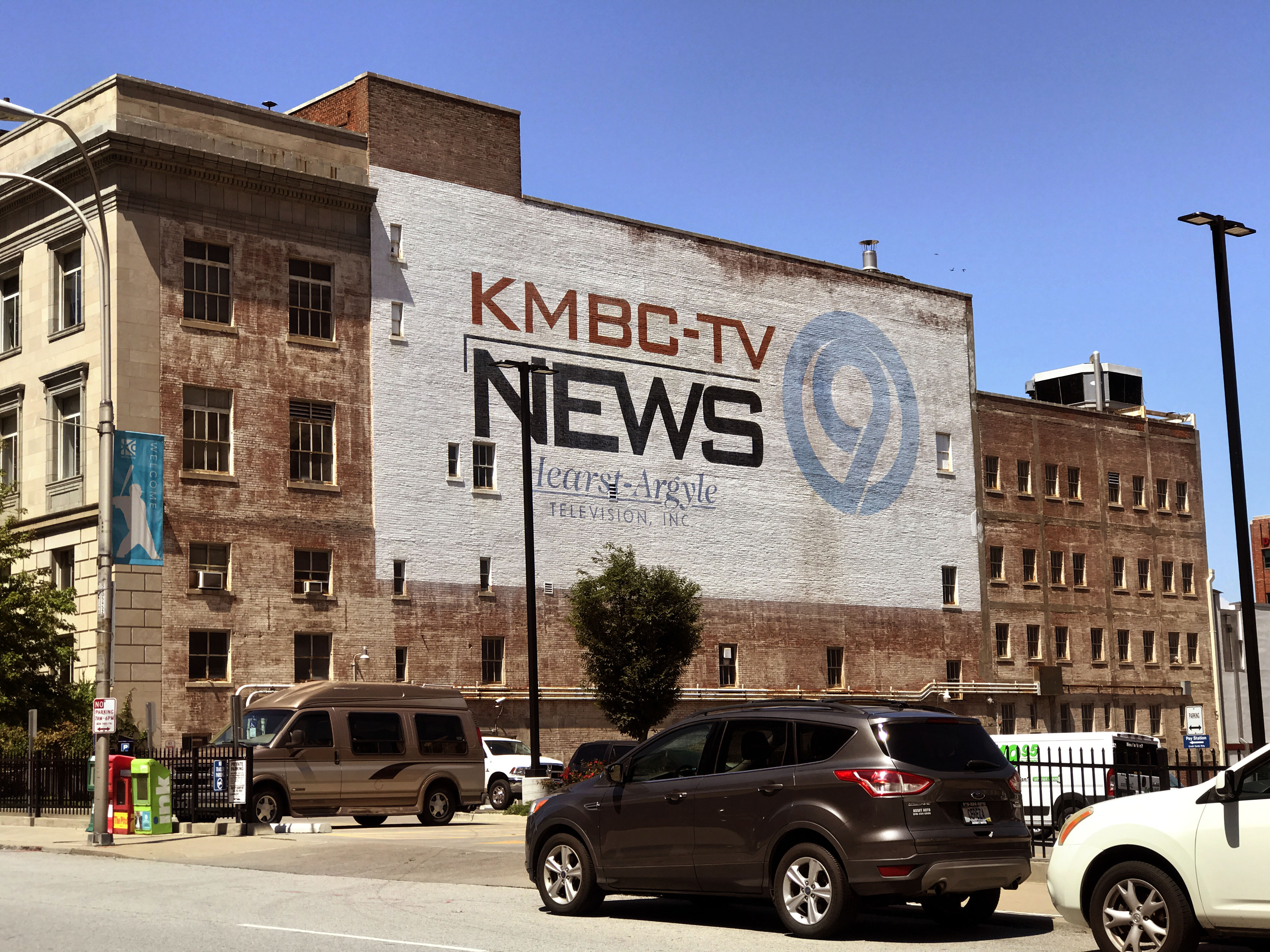
The KMBC-TV and Hearst-Argyle logos, painted on the side of the Lyric

Dinovitz left in 1998, when Hearst-Argyle acquired KCRA-TV in Sacramento, California, and named him to manage it. He was replaced by Wayne Godsey, an executive from the recently acquired Pulitzer station group. The station acquired the services of a helicopter in 2000, giving Kansas City competing TV news helicopters for the first time since 1997. However, ratings began to decline among total households, putting an end to the dominant status KMBC had enjoyed in the 1990s. In 2004, KCTV beat KMBC in the 10 p.m. news race for the first time in a decade, while WDAF edged out KMBC in morning news. Though KMBC preserved leads in key demographics, the market had become more competitive.

Three female employees of KMBC-TV—Maria Antonia, Kelly Eckerman, and Peggy Breit—sued the station in November 2008, alleging age and gender discrimination and a practice of demoting older women in favor of younger women. Antonia claimed that Godsey had told her that she "[would] never anchor at Channel 9 again", while Breit alleged that KMBC management passed over older assignment reporters for higher-profile shifts in favor of younger hires. Hearst settled with the three anchors in September 2010.

KMBC remained ahead of its competitors in 2010 in the morning, early evening, and late evening news ratings. By 2013, WDAF had moved past KMBC to first in early evening news, even though KMBC had surpassed channel 4 in mornings. That November, Larry Moore retired from regular anchor duties and transitioned into an anchor emeritus role, in which he contributed to special projects reports. A 4 p.m. afternoon newscast was added in 2016. KMBC's 10 p.m. newscast was a close second to KCTV in the ratings in 2020, with KMBC and WDAF in a close race in other time slots. A Sunday night sports program was added to the KMBC-TV lineup in 2024.

Despite being operated by KMBC, KCWB/KCWE did not air any local newscasts until March 3, 2008, with the debut of KMBC 9 FirstNews on KCWE, a morning newscast extension which aired weekdays from 7 to 9 a.m. In 2010, the station debuted a half-hour 9 p.m. newscast, seven nights a week; the weeknight editions were expanded to an hour in 2016. A noon newscast was added to the KCWE schedule in September 2020.

== Notable former on-air staff ==
- Walt Bodine – commentator, 1984–2001
- Jonathan Coachman – sportscaster, 1999–2000
- Len Dawson – sportscaster, 1966–1975 while a Kansas City Chiefs quarterback; sports anchor, 1985–2009; sports contributor and analyst, 2009–2022
- Steve Doocy – local host of PM Magazine; news staffer, January–August 1984
- Jeremy Hubbard – reporter and anchor, 1998–2004
- Bill Macatee – sports anchor, 1978–1979
- Russ Mitchell – reporter, 1982–1985
- Craig Sager – sportscaster, 1979–1981
- John Sanders – sportscaster, 1966–1978

== Technical information ==
=== Subchannels ===
KMBC-TV's transmitter is located at 23rd Street and Topping Avenue east of downtown Kansas City, Missouri. The station's signal is multiplexed:

Subchannels of KMBC-TV
Subchannel	Res.	Short name	Programming
9.1	1080i	KMBC-HD	ABC
9.2	480i	Me TV	MeTV
9.3	480i	STORY	Story Television
62.2	480i	H & I	Heroes & Icons (KSMO-TV)
62.3	480i	Dabl	Dabl (KSMO-TV)

Broadcast on behalf of another station

KMBC-TV began broadcasting a digital signal on VHF channel 7 on April 24, 2002. It was the first commercial TV station in Kansas City to broadcast in digital, though public station KCPT had begun broadcasting in 1998. The signal was full-power but had to be curtailed to the south to protect KOAM-TV in Pittsburg, Kansas, which was short-spaced. Though KMBC-TV had originally been projected to continue digital broadcasting in VHF on channel 9 after the transition concluded, this would have made it the only major Kansas City station transmitting on the VHF band. The FCC granted permission to switch that assignment to channel 29 effective February 19, 2009. The channel had been vacated when KCWE terminated analog broadcasts on February 17. This also resolved the spacing issue to KOAM and allowed for a stronger signal to areas south of Kansas City. Analog service continued until the final digital television transition date of June 12, 2009, and was followed by a "nightlight" service to provide digital transition information.
