= KTAS (disambiguation) =

KTAS is a television station in California.

KTAS may also refer to:

- Kjøbenhavns Telefon Aktieselskab, a former Danish telephone company (now part of TDC)
- Knots true airspeed, the speed of the aircraft relative to the airmass in which it is flying
