= KSCN-TV =

Television station in Los Angeles

- Los Angeles, California; United States
- Channels: Digital: 4 (VHF), shared with KWHY; Virtual: 22

Programming
- Affiliations: 22.1: Scientology Network

Ownership
- Owner: Sunset Boulevard Broadcasting Corporation

History
- First air date: March 29, 1965
- Former call signs: KIIX (1962–1964); KPOL-TV (1965–1966); KWHY-TV (1966–2025)
- Former channel numbers: Analog: 22 (UHF, 1962–2009); Digital: 42 (UHF, 2002–2019)
- Former affiliations: African American Ind. (1962–1964); Dark (1964–1965); English Ind. (primary 1965–1989, secondary 1989–1999); Spanish Ind. (1989–2012; 2016–2025); MundoFox/MundoMax (2012–2016)
- Call sign meaning: Scientology Network

Technical information
- Licensing authority: FCC
- Facility ID: 26231
- ERP: 35 kW
- HAAT: 894.1 m (2,933 ft)
- Transmitter coordinates: 34°12′47.9″N 118°3′44.3″W

Links
- Public license information: Public file; LMS

KSCN-TV (channel 22) is a television station in Los Angeles, California, United States, airing programming from the Scientology Network. The station is owned by Sunset Boulevard Broadcasting, a company affiliated with the Church of Scientology. KSCN-TV's studios are located at the KCET Studios on Sunset Boulevard in Hollywood, and its transmitter is located atop Mount Wilson. KSCN-TV shares RF channel 4 under a channel sharing agreement with Garden Grove–licensed KWHY (channel 63).

== History ==
=== Early years as KBIC-TV, KIIX and KPOL-TV ===
On June 19, 1952, John Poole, owner of radio station KBIG (740 AM), filed for a construction permit for a new television station on channel 22 in Los Angeles, which was granted as KPIK on December 10, 1952. It was stated in February that KPIK would debut that fall. Poole announced that the facility, with an effective radiated power of 540,000 watts, would be the most powerful in the country. Construction began in March on a new facility atop Mount Wilson which was proposed to house the UHF television stations proposed for channels 22, 28 and 34 in Los Angeles. The call sign was changed to KBIC-TV, previously housed on the Poole construction permit for channel 46 at Sacramento, on November 10, 1953. KBIC-TV did transmit a test image in 1954, but it never entered program service.

The channel 22 construction permit languished until it was sold in 1962 to the Central Broadcasting Corporation of California for $180,000; the Federal Communications Commission (FCC) approved the sale in January 1963. On January 25, 1963, the call sign was changed to KIIX (pronounced "kicks"), which proceeded to announce that it would aim its programming at the African American community, as the second station of its kind after WOOK-TV in Washington, D.C. Central established studios at 2330 W. Washington Blvd., a former car dealership where the showroom floor became a studio, and set a program schedule of seven hours a day including kids, teenage and news shows. On March 25, KIIX at last entered program service, more than a decade after the original grant of the construction permit to Poole and 20 days after WOOK-TV launched. 30-year-old Larry McCormick, who had held down morning drive at KGFJ (1230 AM), worked at channel 22, hosting "KIIXville", a daily music hour; Los Angeles Rams players Dick Bass and Pervis Atkins covered sports. Three quarters of the station's staff was black.

KIIX had an ambitious start, but it showed signs of financial distress within months. On August 1, it axed much of its live programming and fired 35 staff, a significant change for a station that once produced all but 30 minutes of its six-hour broadcast day live; instead, KIIX would run two hours of films a day to maintain its license. Los Angeles fire commissioner Fred Kline urged the city council to buy KIIX, valued at $485,000 in mostly equipment, for use as an emergency broadcast outlet and even to broadcast criminal lineups instead of having victims drive to police headquarters. Relief would not come until 1964, when the Coast Television Broadcasting Corporation, sister to the Coast Radio Broadcasting Corporation and its KPOL (1540 AM), acquired the station for a total of $205,000 in cash consideration and assumption of notes.

After being off the air since September 1964, channel 22 returned under its new ownership March 29, 1965—delayed from a planned March 1 start—as KPOL-TV, primarily broadcasting older filmed programming; the station was notable for running a limited commercial inventory, with breaks every 15 minutes during movies and no tobacco or alcohol advertising.

=== Becoming KWHY-TV ===
The Capital Cities Broadcasting Company acquired KPOL radio and television in 1966 and immediately spun off the television station to Coast stockholders, including KPOL general manager Frederick Custer and channel 22 program director Robertson Scott, for $400,000. The call sign was changed to KWHY-TV on August 15. On November 14, channel 22 would debut a program that would become a fixture for 35 years: an eight-hour program of stock market coverage, from the opening bell of the New York Stock Exchange to the closing bell of the Pacific Coast Stock Exchange. Prior to the launch of the stock market program, the station was not broadcasting during the day. By 1969, The Stock Market Observer, produced by Scantlin Electronics of Los Angeles, aired in four cities. On weeknights, channel 22 showed Spanish-language fare, and weekends included shows in Korean, Japanese and Chinese.

Coast reached a deal to sell KWHY-TV to Zenith Electronics in 1971; channel 22 would have served as the Los Angeles-area outlet for its Phonevision pay television system. The sale application was dismissed the next year.

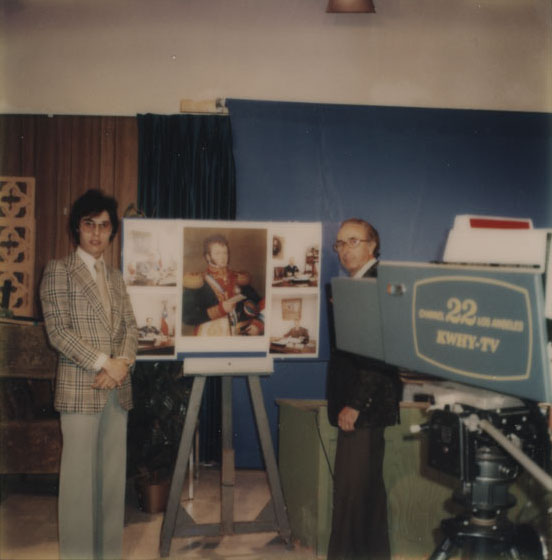
KWHY-TV in 1976

While Zenith's bid to use channel 22 for subscription television had fallen through, another operator would succeed in July 1978. SelecTV, owned by American Subscription Television, launched with a model whereby subscribers paid per program viewed. This differentiated it from competing ON TV, where subscribers paid a flat fee. By November, SelecTV had signed up 5,000 subscribers. Additionally, KWHY-TV increased its effective radiated power from 107,000 watts to 2.57 million.

In 1981, Burt Harris of Harriscope and SelecTV teamed up to buy KWHY-TV from Coast Television for $5.3 million; SelecTV opted to exercise an option to buy channel 22 after Coast continually opposed the airing of R-rated movies by SelecTV. KWHY-TV took the business news programming through a number of facelifts and distribution expansions. In the 1980s, as cable television's reach expanded beyond Los Angeles, the business news format was reinvented. A complete graphical overhaul was made, creating the first multi-element screen. This showed all of the stock and commodity indexes, two rows of stock ticker tapes and over-the-shoulder real-time pricing information; meanwhile, an anchor read the news live. The service was renamed "The Business Channel". During this time, KWHY became the first station in the country with an automated commercial playback machine, and the first to utilize computer animation from an optical disc player.

SelecTV continued to broadcast, even as subscriber numbers for subscription television dwindled. When ON TV folded in Los Angeles, SelecTV acquired its subscribers. SelecTV was acquired by Telstar in January 1987. Continued erosion of the service's subscriber base led KWHY to start preparing a transition to Spanish-language programming during prime time. SelecTV ceased operating over KWHY after more than a decade of operations on March 31, 1989, having reached a deal to conclude the month after going into bankruptcy; one night, KWHY did not air SelecTV because the station had not been paid.

=== Transition to Spanish ===
Without SelecTV, KWHY became a Spanish-language independent station outside of The Business Channel programming on April 1, 1989. It initially aired programming from the Galavision basic cable network, which was at the time preparing to convert to broadcast operations in several cities. However, when Televisa, the owner of Galavision, became a part-owner of Univision, the station ceased broadcasting Galavision programming, carrying a mix of classic movies, game shows and newscasts.

The Business Channel also continued; in 1994, daily market commentator Gene R. Morgan was hit with a $50,000 fine for misrepresenting a stock he underwrote and promoted on his KWHY program. The brand changed to "22 Business News" in 1997 and then "Business News 22" in 1999. On October 4, 1999, KWHY stopped carrying Business News 22, citing a desire to broadcast as a full-time Spanish-language independent due to strong viewer demand. KJLA (channel 57) took over the broadcast of Business News 22 under a time brokerage agreement, and the station announced that it would carry the program on its new digital television station upon its launch; additionally, Business News 22 launched an internet presence at businessnews2000.com. A year later, KJLA discontinued the broadcast of "BizNews 1".

In 2001, following the FCC's decision to allow duopolies (the ownership of two television stations in a single market by one company), Telemundo (which already owned its West Coast flagship, KVEA channel 52) purchased KWHY for $239 million, continuing to operate it as an independent. After NBC purchased Telemundo in 2002, KVEA and KWHY's operations were integrated with NBC owned-and-operated station KNBC (channel 4) at the NBC Studios complex (now The Burbank Studios) in Burbank. NBC Universal (the company that was created through Vivendi Universal's purchase of NBC in 2003) was temporarily allowed to own three stations in the Los Angeles market while FCC regulations normally limited ownership to two. KWHY and KVEA were a duopoly before NBC/Telemundo merged and were allowed to remain co-owned by the FCC pending a decision on the ownership caps.

On September 9, 2007, NBC Universal announced it would place KWHY and its San Juan, Puerto Rico, sister station WKAQ-TV up for sale; this came after NBCU's acquisition of Oxygen Media. The stations were taken off the sale market just over three months later on December 21, 2007.

On May 7, 2010, it was reported that NBCUniversal planned to sell KWHY due to its pending merger with Comcast. NBCUniversal and Comcast had been hoping that the FCC would ease its media ownership rules and allow them to own three stations in major markets, but after the FCC's first bid to do so was overturned in court, the agency took no further steps in that direction. On January 26, 2011, NBCU announced that it would sell KWHY-TV to locally based investment firm The Meruelo Group. The deal was approved by the FCC in April and officially closed on July 6, 2011.

=== As a MundoFox/MundoMax affiliate ===
On August 13, 2012, the station became a charter affiliate of MundoFox and effectively served as the network's flagship station. The station also intended to expand its local news programming. In addition, non-network programming, along with the station's classic television program inventory, subsequently moved to a new digital subchannel that launched the same day under the branding Super 22.2.

On July 27, 2015, the station rebranded as MundoMax 22, in accordance with the network rebranding. A month later, on August 31, Meruelo announced that RCN Television, which owned MundoMax, would take over KWHY-TV's sales and marketing as of September 1; RCN also simultaneously took over the operations of the network's Houston affiliate, KUVM-CD, through a similar arrangement.

=== Return to independence ===
Station logo used from 2018 to 2025

On December 1, 2016, following the demise of MundoMax, KWHY-TV once more began programming a Spanish-language independent format on the station's primary channel. KWHY began to run a broad mix of Spanish language music and entertainment programming (such as La Corte del Pueblo, Operación Repo, ¡Ah qué Kiko!, Cuanto Cuesta el Show, Sala de Justicia, Fiesta de Comediantes, Cine Mexicano, Cine a la Cama and Cineteca 22, among others); it also started airing local Spanish-language newscasts produced in Monterrey, Mexico, by Milenio Televisión branded as Noticias 22 Milenio, later shortened to Milenio Noticias, as well as national broadcasts from Milenio Television.

On January 1, 2022, KWHY-TV started carrying Azteca América on digital subchannel 22.2 after the network affiliation ended with KJLA. The agreement ended on December 31, 2022, after Azteca América ceased operations.

=== Transition to the Scientology Network ===
On July 29, 2024, it was reported that Meruelo Media would sell KWHY-TV to Sunset Boulevard Broadcasting, a company affiliated with the Church of Scientology, for $30 million; the deal includes the channel sharing agreement with KBEH, which would be retained by Meruelo. The sale was completed on January 6, 2025.

On December 16, 2024, Sunset Boulevard Broadcasting filed to change the station's call sign to KSCN-TV. The station began simulcasting the Scientology Network full-time on January 6, 2025, with all other subchannels discontinued.

== News operation ==
By August 2015, KWHY-TV broadcast five hours of locally produced newscasts each week (with one hour each weekday; the station did not broadcast any local newscasts on Saturdays or Sundays). In addition, the station produced the news and lifestyle program Viva el 22, which aired weekdays at 8 a.m. KWHY was the first station in Los Angeles to utilize news anchor-operated TelePrompters for newscasts, and the first to use a news-oriented non-linear editing system (operated by Grass Valley). Following the August 31, 2015, announcement that RCN Television would take over KWHY's operations, the station's newscasts were immediately canceled and the news operation was closed down (RCN had also discontinued MundoFox/MundoMax's national news operation after acquiring full control of the network in July). The station's lead anchor, Palmira Pérez (who was one of five station staffers retained by RCN), was reassigned to anchor one-minute local and national news updates during MundoMax programming.

From March 13, 2017, to November 4, 2024, the station carried newscasts outsourced from Grupo Multimedios networks in Monterrey, Mexico, including Milenio Televisión and Multimedios Televisión's Telediario division. A newscast made for KWHY was taped between 3 and 4:30 p.m. Pacific Time from the Telediario set. The newscasts were anchored by the afternoon Telediario anchor team, and aired weekdays at 7 p.m (1 hour) and 10 p.m. (35 minutes). The weekend edition of the newscast also aired at 7 p.m. and 10 p.m. and was anchored by Pedro Gamboa.

== Technical information ==
=== Subchannels ===
KSCN-TV and KWHY broadcast from Mount Wilson.

Subchannels of KSCN-TV and KWHY
License	Subchannel	Res.	Short name	Programming
KSCN-TV	22.1	1080i	SCNTV	Scientology Network
KWHY	63.1	720p	Univers	Canal de la Fe (Spanish religious)
KWHY	63.2	480i	Nuestra	Nuestra Visión (4:3 on DT2)
KWHY	63.3	480i	Nuestra	Nuestra Visión (4:3 on DT2)
KWHY	63.4	480i	OPEN	[Blank]

=== Analog-to-digital conversion ===
KSCN-TV (as KWHY-TV) became the first UHF station in the market to sign-on a high definition digital signal in 2001. The station ended regular programming on its analog signal, over UHF channel 22, on June 12, 2009, as part of the federally mandated transition from analog to digital television. The station's digital signal remained on its pre-transition UHF channel 42, using virtual channel 22.

As part of the SAFER Act, KWHY kept its analog signal on the air until June 26 to inform viewers of the digital television transition through a loop of public service announcements from the National Association of Broadcasters.

=== Translators and repeaters ===
KWHY over the years has operated several translator facilities in southern California and beyond.

In Santa Barbara, the station owned KWHY-LP (channel 22; formerly on UHF channel 65); that repeater's transmitter facilities were destroyed by the Montecito Tea Fire on November 14, 2008, and the license was surrendered a year later. K46GF in Santa Maria and K47GD-D in San Luis Obispo were surrendered for cancellation on January 9, 2019.

KWHY-TV also provided much of the programming to San Diego Spanish independent station KBOP-CA; what became KSEX-CD later operated independently from KWHY before closing in 2017. The station also aired on K53GF (channel 53; formerly K67FE on channel 67) in Phoenix, Arizona, in the late 1990s and early 2000s; as with the San Diego station, what is now K14RK-D now operates separately.
