= KKOG-TV =

- Ventura, California; United States
- Channels: Analog: 16 (UHF)

Programming
- Affiliations: Independent

Ownership
- Owner: Julian F. Myers; (New Horizons Broadcasting Corp.)

History
- First air date: December 14, 1968
- Last air date: September 13, 1969; (273 days)
- Call sign meaning: "Kalifornia's Koast of Gold" (sic)

Technical information
- ERP: 35.5 kW
- HAAT: 503 m (1,650 ft)

KKOG-TV (channel 16) was an independent television station in Ventura, California, United States. It was the first full-power broadcast station in Ventura County and was owned by Julian F. Myers, a Hollywood talent agent and publicist, through his New Horizons Broadcasting Corporation. The station—dependent entirely on live and local programming—had a brief history, lasting only nine months from December 1968 to September 1969. It struggled to attract viewers and advertisers.

== Construction ==
In August 1966, more than two years after planning began, Julian F. Myers filed for authority to build a new television station on channel 16 in Ventura. Myers had been thinking of the idea for several years and was able to finance the station venture thanks in part to a visit to his dentist. In 1961, he visited his dentist, complaining of a toothache; while operating, the dentist convinced him to join in buying a 218-acre (88 ha) parcel of land in Ventura County. Land values in the county proceeded to surge in the mid-1960s, and when the owners of the land sold, they received an 18-fold return on their investments, providing Myers the initial funding for the station. The station was approved by the Federal Communications Commission that December; Myers expected to be able to put it on the air by May 1967 with an all-local, evenings-only program schedule. It planned to broadcast from studios in the Buenaventura Center shopping center and a transmitter on Red Mountain, north of Ventura. Originally referred to as KSUN-TV, the station adopted the call sign of KKOG-TV ("Kalifornia's Koast of Gold", pronounced "cog") in February 1968.

Construction of KKOG-TV proceeded slowly. Myers had struggled financially in 1966 and sold shares in the business to his brother and nine other friends, who received a minority interest in the venture. The May 1967 opening date was reset to August 1, then November 1. Though Myers leased the transmitter site land at the start of 1967, he did not obtain county zoning approval for a tower there until December. Delays continued throughout 1968; a planned August date was missed, but that month, a contract was let to construct the transmitter building. In October, construction began to refit an old post office and glass factory at 133 S. California Street into the station's studios. A launch was announced for November 23 and then November 30, but KKOG-TV only appeared on television screens on December 14, 1968. This was the last day of the construction permit; the opening broadcast was marred by technical issues, including a 15-minute loss of video and multiple audio failures. In the lead-up to launch, the station's advertising asked whether the much-delayed station was the "World's Longest Pregnancy".

KKOG-TV eschewed the typical programming composition of an independent station. The staff of 40 aimed to produce some 65 hours of live programming a week without the use of any syndicated or filmed shows. This plan was seen as bold and implausible. In a feature article for Broadcasting, Morris Gelman wrote, "No other television station in the country, no network, probably has ever before attempted to rely totally on live programming." The programming ran the gamut and aimed to focus on Ventura County interests. A discussion show, Hollywood and You, featured professionals being asked questions by local residents. Gary Lord Dyer, the manager of a local hamburger restaurant, doubled as the station's children's host on Prince Gary's Kingdom of KKOG, dressed in a clown suit. Other shows covered surfing, travel, fashion, gardening, Spanish-language programming, and news. The production style of the shows was also unusual. No shows had scripts, not even newscasts. Programs were shot with a single camera, with no communication between cameramen and the control room on most productions.

== Shutdown ==
From the outset, KKOG-TV struggled mightily. It headed into a market with heavy competition: seven Los Angeles TV stations plus KEYT in Santa Barbara, plus multiple cable systems. Some areas could not receive an adequate picture from channel 16; in one advertisement, the station advised, "Reception is poor in East Ventura so please move". These issues never truly cleared up. In April 1969, Charlie Champlin of the Los Angeles Times wrote a column on KKOG-TV, revealing that it was not in good shape. Viewer acceptance of the community programming format was low; some potential viewers did not even know they could tune in to the UHF station. The original staff of 40 had dwindled within months to four full-time employees plus volunteers, and the only telephone left was a pay phone in the station's lobby.

By August, desperation had set in. The station was $325,000 in debt, making $1,500 a month in advertising but spending $15,000 a month, even with just one employee on salary. In a last-ditch attempt to get viewers, the station held a "Konstant Kontest"—interrupting almost every program every 20 minutes with questions to which viewers could answer and receive prizes. Myers wrote to 500 businesses in Ventura County soliciting advertising with little success. Creditors were piling up, including RCA, which supplied the station's equipment, and the Internal Revenue Service. Myers—who had divorced from his wife shortly before the station started—himself only had $10 in total assets. On September 11, 1969, Myers announced KKOG-TV would leave the air on the evening of September 13 unless it could receive more cash. Of the shutdown, Bob Holt of the Ventura County Star-Free Press newspaper wrote, "The last hour of the station's life represented the only sustained viewing that I ever did of Channel 16. In part, this was because the quality of their picture had always been poor in our area. However, on the final night, our picture quality was almost good. It reminded me that the vision of an almost blind person is said to clear in his death hour."

Myers returned to the public relations field after KKOG-TV folded, working for American International Pictures and other firms. Ventura County did not have another local TV station until 1985, when KTIE-TV debuted on channel 63 from Oxnard.
