= KWHY =

Television station in Garden Grove, California

- Garden Grove–Los Angeles, California; United States
- City: Garden Grove, California (Note: Originally licensed to Oxnard, California; moved to Garden Grove in 2017.)
- Channels: Digital: 4 (VHF), shared with KSCN-TV; Virtual: 63
- Branding: Canal de la Fe 63.1

Programming
- Affiliations: 63.1: Canal de la Fe; for others, see § Subchannels

Ownership
- Owner: Meruelo Broadcasting; (KWHY-22 Broadcasting, LLC)
- Sister stations: KDAY, KDEY-FM, KLLI, KLOS, KPWR

History
- First air date: August 17, 1985
- Former call signs: KTIE (1985–1988); KADY-TV (1988–2004); KBEH (2004–2025)
- Former channel numbers: Analog: 63 (UHF, 1985–2009); Digital: 24 (UHF, 2003–2018); 42 (UHF, 2018–2019)
- Former affiliations: English-language Independent (1985–1995, 2001–2004); UPN (1995–2001); Spanish-language independent (2004–2006, 2018); Tr3s (2006–2013); CNN Latino (2013–2014); Super 22 (2014–2016); Infomercials (2016–2018)
- Call sign meaning: Carried over from the former KWHY-TV

Technical information
- Licensing authority: FCC
- Facility ID: 56384
- ERP: 35 kW
- HAAT: 894.1 m (2,933 ft)
- Transmitter coordinates: 34°12′47.9″N 118°3′44.3″W

Links
- Public license information: Public file; LMS
- Website: universalchurchusa.org/es/canaldelafe-4/

KWHY (channel 63) is a television station licensed to Garden Grove, California, United States, serving the Los Angeles area as an affiliate of Canal de la Fe ("Faith Channel"), a Spanish-language religious network. Owned by Meruelo Broadcasting, the station maintains studios on West Pico Boulevard in the Mid-City section of Los Angeles. Through a channel sharing agreement with its former sister station KSCN-TV (channel 22), the two stations transmit using KSCN-TV's spectrum from an antenna atop Mount Wilson.

Channel 63 was originally allocated to Oxnard and began broadcasting in 1985 as KTIE-TV, a local independent station for the Ventura County area. It struggled through its original ownership and was sold to Meshulam Riklis in 1988. KTIE-TV was renamed KADY-TV, after Riklis's daughter, Kady Zadora. General manager John Huddy acquired the station in 1991 but left a financial mess in his wake, leading to a court-appointed receivership in 1996. The station stabilized under its next owner, media broker Brian Cobb.

In 2004, KADY-TV built a booster increasing its Los Angeles coverage and was sold to Bela Broadcasting, which switched it to Spanish-language programming and changed the station's call sign to KBEH. Since the sale, the station has primarily been a Spanish-language station under several owners, with program sources including MTV Tres, the short-lived CNN Latino, and its present programming from the Universal Church of the Kingdom of God. The current KWHY call sign was adopted in early 2025 after the sale of channel 22.

== History ==
=== A long road to sign-on ===
The history of channel 63, originally allocated to Oxnard, began on September 29, 1972, when Lola Goelet Yoakem, a scriptwriter from Malibu, obtained a construction permit for the channel. Aside from the assignment of the call letters KTIE, little of note occurred for the next decade. The permit was assigned to a non-profit organization controlled by Yoakem, Limitless Learning, in 1976; this group applied for a HEW grant in 1978.

The station was still unbuilt by 1980. That year, the Federal Communications Commission (FCC) Broadcast Bureau denied Mekaoy Co., which had replaced Limitless Learning as permittee, another time extension to get the station on the air, citing increased interest in UHF television for its crackdown. Two years later, though, the construction permit staged a comeback. After being reinstated on February 22, 1982, new technical parameters were authorized, and KTIE was sold to Thorne Donnelley Jr. for $100,000.

Thorne Donnelley Jr.—grandson of Reuben H. Donnelley, inventor of the yellow pages—brought in new investors, including Beverly Hills accountant and real estate broker Donald Sterling (no relation to the former Los Angeles Clippers owner of the same name), and built studios and offices at 663 Maulhardt Avenue in Oxnard. After a $5 million investment, the station first signed on the air on August 17, 1985, offering movies, syndicated fare and local newscasts to Ventura County from its transmitter on South Mountain near Santa Paula. It was the first television station to operate in Ventura County since KKOG-TV (channel 16) shut down in 1969.

One blow was struck to the station one month before it began broadcasting when must-carry rules requiring local cable systems to add KTIE to their lineups were struck down by a federal court. Though management initially downplayed the impact of this ruling on the station, when the Cox, Century, and Group W cable systems in the market refused to add channel 63, it cut off the station from 30 percent of its planned market. It took nearly ten months for the Group W system, covering the key city of Simi Valley, to finish a channel expansion that included KTIE. The Cox system in Santa Barbara did not add the station until August 1987.

KTIE-TV heavily emphasized local programming. The station had a 15-person news department for local news coverage and produced local sports, a call-in show, and public affairs shows. However, the news department was slimmed down by layoffs in late 1986 and early 1987, in response to revenue that came in under forecasts and incomplete cable coverage. Leasing firms sought payment owed to them for equipment the station used for broadcast.

=== KADY-TV ===
The original owners, fighting ongoing losses to the tune of $1 million a year, sold the station in 1988 to billionaire Meshulam Riklis, the then-husband of actress Pia Zadora. The acquisition was made through Riklis's PZ Entertainment. Riklis changed the call letters to KADY-TV in honor of his and Zadora's daughter Kady, in turn the name of the role Zadora played in the movie Butterfly famously financed by Riklis. The station reintroduced itself with its new call letters with a commercial-free weekend; Riklis infused capital to build up the station. The news department was retained, with the news program moving from 7 to 10 p.m. The station also announced plans for live coverage of areas from Santa Barbara to Thousand Oaks.

Riklis and his executives envisioned KADY as a kind of "superstation" for the West Coast and a base for further media expansion. To that end, beginning in 1989, Riklis simulcast KADY on a newly built station, KADE (channel 33), at San Luis Obispo.

Riklis achieved his wealth by inventing complicated paper schemes like junk bonds and leveraged buyouts. As Riklis's empire began to unravel, KADY-TV was part of settlements, and a payment dispute caused it to lose the San Luis Obispo station where it leased time. The subsequent company, E-II Holdings (a group of jilted Riklis investors), sold KADY to John Huddy, former general manager under Riklis; Huddy had been near a deal in 1991 to acquire the station for $10 million.

Under Huddy ownership, the station returned to local news for the first time since 1989 with the 1993 introduction of Ventura County News Network (VCNN), a separate venture that shared studio space with and aired programming on KADY. VCNN was a joint venture with cable company Jones Intercable. The station also became a charter affiliate of UPN when it launched on January 16, 1995; it built more than 200 miles (320 km) of microwave links to deliver its signal to all cable systems in the Santa Barbara market, adding a translator in Lompoc.

However, Huddy's management became a financial disaster for the television station. Despite promising to offer "the best local news in America", VCNN, unable to perform well due to the way ratings were measured between two media markets in Ventura County and its high costs compared to channel 63's other programs, folded on July 1, 1996. By that time, the station was mired in a string of financial problems. It was behind on rent to Sterling, who had built the station more than a decade prior and still owned the Oxnard facilities, and narrowly avoided eviction in February, only for a court to ratify his right to foreclose on the station a month later for $4 million. Sterling had previously lost a lawsuit for failing to pay monthly rent and a longshot bid at the FCC to have the license transferred back to him. On top of all of this and attempts to sell KADY, Huddy suffered a major heart attack in January 1996.

=== Fixing the mess ===
It at least equals the most poorly managed companies I've seen.

— John W. Hyde, on the situation the Huddys left at KADY

The messy Huddy era ended with creditors, primarily program providers, forcing the station into bankruptcy and the naming of a court-appointed trustee, film executive producer John W. Hyde, in July 1996. Hyde worked to repair a station in disarray; the state of California had designated KADY a "problem employer" due to a spate of claims made to the state labor commission, while the bankruptcy judge hearing the case had remarked that testimony about its accounting practices "made [her] skin crawl".

Within a year, a deal had been reached to buy the station, subject to potential outbidding, with Paxson Communications placing an $8 million bid on KADY in July 1997 as part of its national purchasing spree to build Paxnet. At the auction at the end of September, a surprise $11 million bid, from media broker Brian Cobb, won out.

Cobb had no immediate plans for what to do with the station. However, he soon cast his gaze south. Cobb began a $4 million facility upgrade by moving the station's studio facilities from Oxnard to Camarillo and filed to boost the station's power to cover Simi Valley and the Conejo Valley better. Another go at local news was made, this time using newscasts produced by Santa Barbara ABC affiliate KEYT-TV, using studio and editing space provided by KADY. The station abruptly disaffiliated from UPN on September 1, 2001.

=== Going Spanish ===
Logo used after the Bela acquisition

In 2004, Cobb sold the station for $30 million to Bela, LLC, a Florida-based Spanish-language broadcaster headed by Bob Behar. The move came after KADY was approved to build a booster on Mount Wilson, a major move to gain visibility in the Los Angeles market. In May 2004, the station dropped its prior programming and became KBEH, a Spanish-language independent targeting the Los Angeles market and available on Los Angeles-area cable systems. In 2006, MTV Tr3s launched, with Bela's KBEH and KMOH-TV/KEJR-LP in the Phoenix market switching to the network.

Bela Broadcasting sold KBEH to Hero Broadcasting in January 2008. On January 28, 2013, KBEH began serving as the first station of CNN Latino, a news service targeting U.S. Hispanics focusing on news, lifestyle, documentary, talk and debate program as an alternative to traditional Hispanic networks. The service's initial rollout on the station began with a branded programming block of eight hours of customized content from 3 to 11 p.m. CNN Latino shut down in February 2014.

In the FCC's incentive auction in 2017, KBEH sold its spectrum for $146,627,980 and indicated that it would enter into a post-auction channel sharing agreement. KBEH then reached a channel sharing agreement with KWHY-TV (channel 22); Hero Broadcasting also agreed to sell the KBEH license to KWHY's owner, Meruelo Television, for $10 million. It was the first "zombie" station—a license without a channel—to be sold after the auction.

Logo used under Hero ownership

Meruelo relaunched KBEH in May 2018, focusing on the family and women's audiences with a variety of telenovelas including Rebeca, Camelia la Texana, and Las Aparicio. Within months, the new format was scrapped; by August 2018, the station began to air Canal de la Fe, a religious television channel from the Universal Church of the Kingdom of God.

On February 2, 2025, the station changed its call sign to KWHY. Meruelo had previously sold the original KWHY-TV to the Church of Scientology, and its call sign changed to KSCN-TV.

== Technical information ==
=== Subchannels ===
KSCN-TV and KWHY broadcast from Mount Wilson.

Subchannels of KSCN-TV and KWHY
License	Subchannel	Res.	Short name	Programming
KSCN-TV	22.1	1080i	SCNTV	Scientology Network
KWHY	63.1	720p	Univers	Canal de la Fe (Spanish religious)
KWHY	63.2	480i	Nuestra	Nuestra Visión (4:3 on DT2)
KWHY	63.3	480i	Nuestra	Nuestra Visión (4:3 on DT2)
KWHY	63.4	480i	OPEN	[Blank]

=== Analog-to-digital conversion ===
KWHY (as KBEH) shut down its analog signal, over UHF channel 63, on June 12, 2009, as part of the federally mandated transition from analog to digital television. The station's digital signal remained on its pre-transition UHF channel 24, using virtual channel 63.
