= Fox 24 =

FOX 24 may refer to one of the following television stations in the United States that are currently affiliated or were former affiliates with the Fox Broadcasting Company:

== Current ==
- KFTA-TV in Fort Smith, Arkansas
- KKFX-CD in San Luis Obispo, California
- KPEJ-TV in Odessa, Texas
- WGXA in Macon, Georgia
- WTAT-TV in Charleston, South Carolina
- KSAS in Wichita, Kansas

== Former ==
- WCGV-TV in Milwaukee, Wisconsin (1987–1992)
- WPTY-TV (now WATN-TV) in Memphis, Tennessee (1990–1995)
