= KCPR =

- San Luis Obispo, California; United States
- Broadcast area: San Luis Obispo County, California
- Frequency: 91.3 MHz
- Branding: Cal Poly Radio - 91.3 FM

Programming
- Format: Campus radio

Ownership
- Owner: California Polytechnic State University

History
- First air date: 1968
- Call sign meaning: K Cal Poly Radio

Technical information
- Facility ID: 8324
- Class: A
- ERP: 310 watts
- HAAT: 432 meters (1,417 ft)
- Transmitter coordinates: type:city 35°21′38.00″N 120°39′21.00″W

Links
- Webcast: Listen Live
- Website: kcpr.org

KCPR (91.3 FM) is a non-commercial radio station that is licensed to San Luis Obispo, California. Owned by California Polytechnic State University (Cal Poly) in San Luis Obispo, the station is operated by students from its on-campus studio located in the Graphic Arts building. In addition to its FM broadcast, KCPR streams its programming online 24 hours a day and has established a growing social media audience.

KCPR is known for launching the careers of several entertainers and public figures, including musician "Weird Al" Yankovic, comedian Eric Schwartz, and news reporter David Kerley.

== History ==
KCPR debuted in August 1968, making its first broadcast with a small two-watt transmitter. According to station lore, the first words spoken on-air were, "Is this the damn switch?" However, an archived version of KCPR's website from 2000 holds the station's first words to be, "How the hell do you turn this thing on?"

Cal Poly professor and former KCPR disc jockey Jim Cushing describes the station's musical philosophy as "to provide people with a blend of music that they will not find on any other station, to remind people that the musical culture belongs to them". Among the programs that have anchored the KCPR program schedule for years include The Breakfast Club, Afternoon Delight, The Comedown, The Lounge, and Club 91.

Musician Alfred "Weird Al" Yankovic served as a disc jockey at KCPR while attending Cal Poly in the late 1970s as an undergraduate architecture student. He recorded his iconic parody song "My Bologna" on campus in the bathroom across the hall from the station's original location on the second floor of the Graphic Arts Building (Building 26). Yankovic returned to Cal Poly in the 1990s for an interview and recorded a station identification for KCPR. That men's room has been dubbed 'Studio 229.'

KCPR is branded as "Cal Poly Radio". Previously, it was known as "Burnt Dog Radio", an axiom that is reflected in one of the station's early logo designs that featured the RCA Victor dog. A logo from the 1980s shows the RCA dog with its head blown off, next to a speaker, and a dog bowl labeled KCPR. Presumably, the loud music is what caused the RCA dog's head to explode, a visual representation of the alternative direction that KCPR took after abandoning its top 40 format in 1983.

In the summer of 2008, KCPR moved to a new studio in the same building after 39 years of continuous operation.

In 2017, Great Value Colleges, a consumer resource website for prospective university students, selected KCPR as one of its top 30 college radio stations in the United States.

== Promotions ==
Occasionally, KCPR hosts concerts at SLO Brew in downtown San Luis Obispo. Some notable artists have performed at these shows, including Jorja Smith and The Strokes.

During the 2017–2018 academic year, KCPR began hosting Club 91 events at Underground Brewing Company in downtown San Luis Obispo. Club 91 features live music played by KCPR student DJs.

== Notable personalities ==
- David Kerley, ABC News correspondent; previously an anchor at KCOY (channel 12) in Santa Maria, California and KCPR news director
- Eric Schwartz, comedian; was KCPR News director and journalism student; graduated 1996
- "Weird Al" Yankovic, musician

== See also ==
- Campus radio
- List of college radio stations in the United States
