= Channel 24 low-power TV stations in the United States =

The following low-power television stations broadcast on digital or analog channel 24 in the United States:

- K24AG-D in Trapper Creek, Alaska
- K24BY-D in Pahrump, Nevada
- K24CH-D in Cortez, etc., Colorado
- K24CT-D in Alamogordo, New Mexico
- K24CY-D in St. George, Utah
- K24DD-D in Plevna, Montana
- K24DK-D in Bullhead City, Arizona
- K24DT-D in Aberdeen, South Dakota
- K24EY-D in Walker Lake, Nevada
- K24EZ-D in Idalia, Colorado
- K24FE-D in Beaver, etc., Utah
- K24FF-D in Lovelock, Nevada
- K24FH-D in Glide, etc., Oregon
- K24FL-D in Columbus, Montana
- K24FU-D in Pleasant Valley, Colorado
- K24GD-D in Hardin, Montana
- K24GE-D in Wells, Nevada
- K24GO-D in Blair, Nebraska
- K24GT-D in Kemmerer, Wyoming
- K24GY-D in Ely, Nevada
- K24HG-D in Cozad, Nebraska
- K24HH-D in Wichita Falls, Texas
- K24HP-D in Price, etc., Utah
- K24HQ-D in Boulder, Colorado
- K24HU-D in Burley, etc., Idaho
- K24IB-D in Verdi/Mogul, Nevada
- K24ID-D in Ferndale, Montana
- K24IM-D in Keosauqua, Iowa
- K24IN-D in Green River, Utah
- K24IP-D in Huntington, Utah
- K24IT-D in Hoquiam, Washington
- K24IV-D in Farmington, New Mexico
- K24IX-D in Turkey, Texas
- K24IY-D in Raton, New Mexico
- K24JE-D in Sunriver, Oregon
- K24JG-D in Norfolk, Nebraska
- K24JL-D in Beowowe, Nevada
- K24JN-D in Lewiston, Idaho
- K24JO-D in Crawford, Colorado
- K24JV-D in St. James, Minnesota
- K24KG-D in Madras, Oregon
- K24KJ-D in Libby, Montana
- K24KM-D in Colstrip, etc., Montana
- K24KR-D in Jacks Cabin, Colorado
- K24KS-D in Flagstaff, Arizona
- K24KT-D in Walker, Minnesota
- K24KU-D in Chinook, Montana
- K24KV-D in Logan, Utah
- K24KX-D in Cedarville, California
- K24LM-D in Bridgeport, Washington
- K24LQ-D in Collbran, Colorado
- K24LS-D in Lucerne Valley, California
- K24LX-D in Orderville, Utah
- K24LY-D in Cottage Grove, Oregon
- K24MB-D in Hobbs, New Mexico
- K24MC-D in Baker Valley, Oregon
- K24MD-D in Sayre, Oklahoma
- K24ME-D in Milton-Freewater, Oregon
- K24MF-D in Florence, Oregon
- K24MH-D in Powers, Oregon
- K24MI-D in Redding, California
- K24MJ-D in Shoshoni, Wyoming
- K24MK-D in Glenrock, Wyoming
- K24ML-D in Taos, New Mexico
- K24MM-D in Red Lake, Minnesota
- K24MN-D in Phillips County, Montana
- K24MO-D in Tyler, Texas
- K24MP-D in Butte, Montana
- K24MQ-D in Marysvale, Utah
- K24MS-D in Roseau, Minnesota
- K24MT-D in International Falls, Minnesota
- K24MU-D in Summit County, Utah
- K24MV-D in Fort Peck, Montana
- K24MW-D in Clovis, New Mexico
- K24MX-D in Deming, New Mexico
- K24MY-D in Kanarraville, Utah
- K24MZ-D in Fillmore, etc., Utah
- K24NA-D in Delta, Utah
- K24NB-D in Elko, Nevada
- K24NC-D in Roosevelt, Utah
- K24ND-D in Orangeville, Utah
- K24NE-D in Overton, Nevada
- K24NF-D in Tucumcari, New Mexico
- K24NG-D in Lake Havasu City, Arizona
- K24NH-D in Durango, Colorado
- K24NI-D in Yuma, Arizona
- K24NK-D in Memphis, Texas
- K24NM-D in Sargents, Colorado
- K24NO-D in Bonners Ferry, Idaho
- K24NQ-D in Golconda, Nevada
- K24NR-D in Amarillo, Texas
- K24NS-D in Stateline, Nevada
- K24NZ-D in Carbondale, Colorado
- K24OE-D in Jackson, Wyoming
- K24OJ-D in Uvalde, Texas
- K24ON-D in Ridgecrest, California
- KAAP-LD in Santa Cruz, California
- KAGW-CD in Wichita, Kansas
- KBEH in Santa Paula, California
- KBID-LP in Fresno, California
- KBIT-LD in Monterey, California
- KBNT-CD in San Diego, California
- KCCX-LD in Corpus Christi, Texas
- KCWL-LD in Monroe, Louisiana
- KDSO-LD in Medford, Oregon
- KEGS-LD in Las Vegas, Nevada
- KEGW-CD in Siloam Springs, Arkansas
- KEOO-LD in Midland, Texas
- KFAM-CD in Lake Charles, Louisiana
- KFSM-TV in Van Buren, Arkansas
- KIAT-LD in Jonesboro, Arkansas
- KKFX-CD in San Luis Obispo, California
- KKTF-LD in Chico, California
- KMLN-LD in Fort Collins, Colorado
- KPMF-LD in Paragould, Arkansas
- KRLJ-LD in Joplin, Missouri
- KRPG-LD in Des Moines, Iowa
- KTTA-LD in Monroe, Utah
- KTUL in McAlester, Oklahoma
- KTXU-LD in West Lake Hills, Texas
- KXIP-LD in Paris, Texas
- KXTQ-CD in Lubbock, Texas
- KYCW-LD in Branson, Missouri
- KZLL-LD in Joplin, Missouri
- W24CL-D in Grantsburg, Wisconsin
- W24CS-D in Reading, Pennsylvania
- W24DB-D in Clarks Summit, Pennsylvania
- W24DL-D in Saginaw, Michigan
- W24EC-D in Manteo, North Carolina
- W24ER-D in Clarksburg, West Virginia
- W24ES-D in Moorefield, West Virginia
- W24ET-D in Atlantic City, New Jersey
- W24EU-D in Erie, Pennsylvania
- W24EX-D in Florence, South Carolina
- W24EZ-D in Allingtown, Connecticut
- W24FB-D in Brazil, Indiana
- W24FC-D in Augusta, Georgia
- W39CA-D in Fulton, Mississippi
- WDCO-CD in Woodstock, Virginia
- WDDA-LD in Chattanooga, Tennessee
- WDEM-CD in Columbus, Ohio
- WDLH-LD in Evansville, Indiana
- WDMW-LD in Milwaukee, Wisconsin
- WFMZ-AB in Allentown, Pennsylvania
- WHSV-TV (DRT) in Winchester, Virginia
- WHTX-LD in Springfield, Massachusetts
- WJTS-CD in Jasper, Indiana
- WKSY-LD in Rome, Georgia
- WLWD-LD in Dayton, Ohio
- WNPX-LD in Nashville, Tennessee
- WONO-CD in Syracuse, etc., New York
- WPDN-LD in Pittsburgh, Pennsylvania
- WPHA-CD in Philadelphia, Pennsylvania
- WPXI (DRT) in Uniontown, Pennsylvania
- WQQZ-CD in Ponce, Puerto Rico
- WTBM-CD in Birmingham, Alabama
- WUBX-CD in Durham, etc., North Carolina
- WUDZ-LD in Indianapolis, Indiana
- WUWT-CD in Union City, Tennessee
- WVNC-LD in Watertown, New York
- WVND-LD in Suwanee, Georgia
- WWDD-LD in Baltimore, Maryland
- WWEO-LD in Defuniak Springs, Florida
- WYKE-CD in Inglis/Yankeetown, Florida
- WZCK-LD in Madison, Wisconsin

The following low-power stations, which are no longer licensed, formerly broadcast on analog or digital channel 24:

- K24CS-D in Granite Falls, Minnesota
- K24DA-D in Big Piney, etc., Wyoming
- K24DP in San Jon, New Mexico
- K24DX in Pendleton, etc., Oregon
- K24FA in Blythe, California
- K24FI in Orangeville, Utah
- K24GZ in Rock Springs, Wyoming
- K24IQ-D in Billings, Montana
- K24JI-D in Hermiston, Oregon
- K24JR-D in Orr, Minnesota
- K24KD-D in Salix, Iowa
- K24NL-D in Weed, California
- K24NN-D in Twin Falls, Idaho
- KIJK-LD in Lincoln, Nebraska
- KKAZ-CA in Omaha, Nebraska
- KPAH-LP in Laramie, Wyoming
- KQFW-LD in Dallas, Texas
- KRUB-LD in Cedar Rapids, Iowa
- KXLJ-LD in Juneau, Alaska
- KZSA-LD in San Angelo, Texas
- W24BB-D in East Stroudsburg, Pennsylvania
- W24DE-D in Miami, Florida
- W24DM-D in Gainesville, Florida
- W24DN-D in Clarksburg, West Virginia
- W24OI in Virginia Beach, Virginia
- WAZH-CD in Harrisonburg, Virginia
- WEWE-LP in Sussex County, Delaware
- WLNN-CD in Boone, North Carolina
- WQTV-LP in Murray, Kentucky
- WSJX-LP in Aquadilla, Puerto Rico
- WUEB-LD in Rockford, Illinois
