= KTAS =

Television station in San Luis Obispo, California

- San Luis Obispo–Santa Maria–; Santa Barbara, California; United States
- City: San Luis Obispo, California
- Channels: Digital: 34 (UHF); Virtual: 33

Programming
- Affiliations: 33.1: Estrella TV; for others, see § Subchannels

Ownership
- Owner: Major Market Broadcasting; (Major Market Broadcasting of California, Inc.)

History
- First air date: January 21, 1990 (Note: Station off the air from November 1, 1991, to February 7, 1997.)
- Former call signs: KADE (1990–1997)
- Former channel number: Analog: 33 (UHF, 1990–2009)
- Former affiliations: Independent (1990–1991); Silent (1991–1997); Univision (1997–2001); Telemundo (2001–2023); TeleXitos (2023–2024); Diya TV (2024–2026, now on 33.3)
- Call sign meaning: Replaced K07TA "KTA"

Technical information
- Licensing authority: FCC
- Facility ID: 12930
- ERP: 80.4 kW
- HAAT: 453 m (1,486 ft)
- Transmitter coordinates: 35°21′37.9″N 120°39′24.6″W

Links
- Public license information: Public file; LMS

KTAS (channel 33) is a television station licensed to San Luis Obispo, California, United States, serving the Central Coast of California as an affiliate of Estrella TV. Owned by Major Market Broadcasting, the station maintains studios on Carmen Lane in Santa Maria and a transmitter atop Cuesta Peak.

Channel 33 in San Luis Obispo went on the air in January 1990 as KADE. Its airtime was leased by KADY, an independent station in Oxnard, to expand its programming. A dispute over payment terms ended the lease in November 1991 and plunged the station into non-operational status for more than five years. It returned to the air in February 1997 and was sold later that year to Raul and Consuelo Palazuelos. The Palazuelos family renamed the station KTAS, inheriting the Spanish-language programming that had aired on two low-power TV stations in the market since 1986. The station was a Telemundo affiliate from 2001 to 2023, when the family sold the license and transferred rights to Telemundo programming to KCOY-TV effective February 1.

== History ==
In 1984, the Federal Communications Commission (FCC) designated a series of nine applications for channel 33 in San Luis Obispo for comparative hearing, Community Media Corporation was awarded the construction permit and built the station in association with Riklis Broadcasting, which owned KADY in Oxnard and leased the station's broadcast day. Channel 33 went on the air as KADE, a simulcast of KADY, on January 21, 1990. The deal included a provision allowing Riklis to buy KADE for an agreed price.

Riklis management contended that the demands of Community Media owner Alene Whitten for operating capital grew too high for their budgetary requirements. Riklis then sought to buy the station as previously agreed, only for Community Media to refuse. As a result of Riklis ceasing to make monthly lease payments, KADE shut down on November 1, 1991, a move that cost KADY advertising revenue, ratings, and cable carriage in the San Luis Obispo area. After the FCC approved a transfer of control of Community Media to Riklis in 1993, this never took place, and the company instead applied to sell KADE to Raul and Consuelo Palazuelos, who had been original applicants for channel 33 in 1984 in partnership with Sainte Broadcasting, a company owned by Chester Smith.

Meanwhile, in 1986, K07TA (sometimes promoted as "KOTA" or "KTA") went on as a low-power Spanish-language station at Santa Maria. Built by Sainte, it expanded its reach with the launch of Morro Bay-licensed K09UF ("KOUF"), serving San Luis Obispo. Riklis reached a deal to acquire the stations at the end of 1988 in order to expand the coverage area of KADY, but it later dropped out once it became clear that Riklis could not inherit the cable carriage of the existing low-power stations. In addition to network programming from Univision, K07TA aired some local programming, such as the half-hour Media Hora news and features program, which debuted in 1990. However, it also struggled beginning in 1993 when Sonic Cable removed it from its lineup and replaced it with the national feed of Telemundo, in which Sonic could sell its own advertising time. KTA was not restored to the Sonic lineup until January 1996.

Parties associated with KADY intervened in the attempt to sell KADE to the Palazuelos, which delayed completion of the sale until 1997, when a trustee appointed the year before to handle Riklis's affairs withdrew the company's opposition. That year, the station returned to air as KTAS, a full-power successor to the low-power stations. KTAS lost its Univision affiliation and switched to Telemundo on April 1, 2001, when KPMR signed on the air.

On January 4, 2023, Raul and Consuelo Palazuelos filed to sell KTAS to International Communications Network—owner of KSDY-LD in San Diego—for $4 million. The Telemundo affiliation was not included in the sale. A message appearing on the Telemundo Costa Central website at that time indicated that the service would move to KCOY-TV 12.1 and KKFX-CD 24.2, previously airing the national digital channel Dabl, on February 1; at the time of launch, KEYT-TV 3.5 was also added. The sale fell through in December 2023; a notice of non-consummation was posted on December 21.

In October 2024, it was announced that the station would sell to Major Market Broadcasting from Palazuelos 2023 Revocable Trust for $550,000; the sale was completed in January 2025.

== Technical information ==
=== Subchannels ===
KTAS's transmitter is located atop Cuesta Peak. Its signal is multiplexed:

Subchannels of KTAS
Channel	Res.	Short name	Programming
33.1	1080i	KTAS	Estrella TV
33.2	480i	Novlsma	Mas Show
33.3	480i	DiyaTV	Diya TV
33.7	480i	OANPlus	One America Plus
33.8	480i	AWEPlus	AWE Plus
33.9	480i	Antenna	Antenna TV (4:3)
33.10	480i	JTV	Jewelry Television
33.11	480i	HSN	HSN
33.12	480i	QVC	QVC

=== Analog-to-digital conversion ===
KTAS shut down its analog signal, over UHF channel 33, on February 17, 2009, the original target date on which full-power television stations in the United States were to transition from analog to digital broadcasts under federal mandate (which was later pushed back to June 12, 2009). The station's digital signal remained on its pre-transition UHF channel 34, using virtual channel 33.
