= Larry Moore (reporter) =

American television newscaster

Larry Moore (born July 26, 1945) is a television newscaster in Kansas City, Missouri, United States for over 3 decades. He has been called “Mr. Kansas City” due to his local prominence. He is a frequent participant and fundraiser in many charitable events.

Moore has been Chief News Anchor and Editor since 1972 at KMBC-TV in Kansas City except for a three-year absence.

== Education and early career ==
Moore received a B.A. in English from Truman State University in Kirksville, Missouri in 1967. While in college, he was a reporter and weekend editor for the Kirksville Daily Express newspaper. After college, he worked for United Press International. He started a master's degree program at the University of Missouri when he decided to pursue a career in television. He joined KMBC-TV in 1968 as a reporter.

== Television career ==
In January 1972, after 4 years at KMBC, Moore became the primary news anchor until 1979. He had a brief stint in 1980 as a weekend anchor for WLS-TV, the ABC owned-and-operated station in Chicago. He left WLS in 1982 to become co-anchor at KPIX-TV in San Francisco for 2 years; leaving abruptly, possibly related to his lymphoma, a type of cancer. He returned to KMBC-TV in August 1983.

Moore has been cited by the Kansas City Media Reporters organization as Best TV news anchor and one of Kansas City's Top 10 Celebrities by Kansas City magazine.

== Awards ==
- Kansas Association of Broadcasters (KAB), Sonny Slater Award for Service to Station and Community, 2002
- Webster University, Community Leadership Award for his community service and professional accomplishments.
- Jesuit order, Ignatian Award for his contributions to the Rockhurst community and Rockhurst High School
- Broderick Award for accomplishments in community and civic leadership.
- Zink the Zebra annual community involvement award.
- Dream Factory (national convention), Stephen K. Douglas Award for his help in making dreams come true for chronically and seriously ill children
- Dream Factory (local chapter), Dream Maker of the Year Award, 2001.
- American Cancer Society, Ambassador of Hope Courage Award for the cancer educational on television and in the community by sharing his personal struggle with cancer.

== Participation in charities ==
Moore has participated extensively in fundraising for charities. He was an auctioneer at several fund-raising events, including the University of Missouri Alumni picnic-auction-gala, Conception Seminary, the Valentine Gala to prevent child abuse, the Central City School Fund auction, St. Teresa's Academy auction and the Ozanam premiere gala. He has also participated in fund raising events for the Diocese of Kansas City.

Moore as served as master of ceremonies of the American Royal Champion Livestock auction and multiple times at the Threads and Threads Gala benefiting the University of Kansas Cancer Institute, where he was treated for lymphoma, a type of cancer

He has served on the community boards of numerous charitable organization including the Cystic Fibrosis Foundation, American Cancer Society, Kansas City Community Gardens, National Lost-Child Network, American Royal, Ozanam Home for Boys, St. Patrick's Day parade committee, Avila College and the Kansas City Press Club.

== Books authored ==
- The 20 by 30 Backyard Garden Guide

== Family ==
Moore and his wife, Ruth, have three daughters and two sons.
