= Scientology Network =

Television network and streaming service

- Country: United States
- Headquarters: Los Angeles, California

Programming
- Language: English
- Picture format: 1080i (HDTV)

Ownership
- Owner: Church of Scientology

History
- Launched: March 12, 2018

Links
- Website: www.scientology.tv

Availability

Terrestrial
- KSCN-TV Los Angeles: Channel 22.1
- WFTT-TV Venice, Florida: Channel 62.1

Streaming media
- Scientology.tv: scientology.tv/tv/
- DIRECTV: Channel 320
- Apple TV, Amazon Fire TV, Roku Channel, Google TV: Scientology Network app

Scientology Network is an American television network and streaming service launched by the Church of Scientology in 2018.

== History ==
In 2011, the Church of Scientology acquired the KCET Studios property, a 4.5-acre (1.8 ha) parcel with 300,000 square feet (27,900 m^{2}) of facility which included two sound stages, post-production facilities, offices, and a satellite uplink. The studios, located at 4401 Sunset Blvd in Los Angeles, California, are a cultural landmark in Hollywood that dates back to 1912. In 1978, the property had been designated a Los Angeles Historic-Cultural Monument. When KCET split from PBS, they sold the studio property for $45 million with leaseback, remaining for another year.

The Church of Scientology says they spent a further $50 million on renovations and upgrades on the facility which was slated to be the "centralized global communications hub for the church's media activities, which include public service announcements, television programming, advertisements, magazines, brochures, internet and every other conceivable type of content." The grand opening was held in May 2016 with its new name "Scientology Media Productions".

== The network ==
The Church of Scientology announced that Scientology Network would launch on March 12, 2018 and be available on DirecTV channel 320, Apple TV, Roku, Amazon Fire TV, iTunes, Google Play, and the website Scientology.tv. As of 2021, it was also available on Google Chromecast and aired in 17 languages. In 2018, industry insiders from The Daily Beast reported that Scientology pays DirecTV roughly $4 million annually in carriage fees.

The network is dedicated to Scientology topics and broadcasts such shows as Meet a Scientologist and L. Ron Hubbard: In His Own Voice.

== Los Angeles broadcast station ==
Meruelo Media announced on July 29, 2024 that KWHY-TV (channel 22) would be sold to a broadcast division of the Church (Note: Use of "Church" or "the Church" is a common shortened form of "Church of Scientology"; see The Church (Scientology).) known as Sunset Boulevard Broadcasting for $30 million; the deal includes a channel sharing agreement with KBEH (channel 63), which remains under Meruelo ownership.

On December 16, 2024, the Sunset Boulevard Broadcasting Corporation filed to change the station's call letters to KSCN-TV. The station began simulcasting Scientology Network full-time on January 6, 2025, with it currently being the only channel the station offers.

== Response ==
According to Variety, the "Scientology Network appears to be another example of a well-heeled brand sidestepping traditional media and advertising platforms for a direct-to-consumer approach with a 24/7 TV channel to spread its message." Depicting something "in between a self-help seminar, an infomercial, and a drug commercial", Vox describes the channel as showing little of Scientology techniques or terminology but instead offering a series of very similar programs, mostly interviews with people who have already chosen Scientology contrasted with images depicting the downsides of modern life without Scientology. Vox further called the channel an "intersection of capitalism and spirituality that has come to define the American religious landscape."

A Vice writer said the network was supposed to convey the principles of Scientology, but he instead found it confusing, jargon-heavy, contradictory, repetitive and boring, and certain claims by Scientology got grander and vaguer. For example, in one show the "implication was that Scientology is the reason that the rioting that happened in Ferguson didn't spread nationwide" or in the case of the Colombian conflict "as the result of Scientologists giving talks and handing out literature on the importance of human rights, crime dropped and complaints against the military—who had previously been murdering civilians—fell 96 percent." The reviewer stated that the shows themselves are basically commercials for Scientology, which would have commercial breaks showing commercials for more commercials.

Quartz media said, "Unfortunately for Scientology, the church picked literally the worst time to get into the TV game. The number of cable and streaming TV channels and series has increased exponentially in recent years—making it harder and harder for brands to stick out in the era of 'peak TV'."
