= David Kerley =

American television reporter

Paul David Kerley III (born May 30, 1957), known professionally as David Kerley, is an American journalist who was a correspondent for ABC News in Washington, D.C.

== Early life and education ==
A native of Southern California, Kerley earned a bachelor's degree from California Polytechnic State University, San Luis Obispo. During college, Kerley, who grew up near Disneyland, worked at the theme park's Tomorrowland.

== Professional career ==
Kerley began his broadcasting career in radio, as the news director for KCPR-FM in San Luis Obispo. He then shifted to television, first at nearby KCOY in Santa Maria as 11 p.m. anchor and 6 p.m. sports anchor from 1978 to 1981 (see him in blooper tape on YouTube from that era). He then moved to KTVB in Boise, Idaho, for three years and then to Seattle for fifteen years. He started at KIRO-TV in 1983, moved to rival KING-TV in 1986 for nearly six years, then back to KIRO until 1998.

In November 1998, Kerley joined WBBM-TV in Chicago. In early 2001, he became the station's lead news anchor—anchoring the 5 p.m. and 10 p.m. newscasts—after previously having filled in as the station's 10 p.m. anchor in late 2000. In late 2001, however, the station announced that it planned to replace Kerley. In early 2002, Kerley was officially replaced by Antonio Mora.

In February 2004, Kerley joined ABC News as an overnight anchor and reporter for World News Now, World News This Morning, and ABC News Now. "I consider ABC to be the premier broadcast journalism company in the country, possibly the world," he told friends, according to a February 11, 2004 Chicago Sun-Times article. "Quite an adventure lies ahead." Since joining ABC News, Kerley has traveled to Baghdad, covered Hurricane Katrina, and covered the 2005 Asia-Pacific Economic Cooperation summit.

In 2004, Kerley was named a general assignment correspondent for ABC News. As of July 25, 2017, he has been ABC News's Senior Transportation Correspondent.

== Personal ==
Kerley and his wife, Janet Myers, reside in McLean, Virginia. Myers was also a reporter at KTVB in Boise in the early 1980s and later at KING-TV in Seattle.
