= K14RK-D =

Television station in Phoenix, Arizona

- Phoenix, Arizona; United States
- Channels: Digital: 14 (UHF); Virtual: 14
- Branding: Good News TV

Programming
- Affiliations: 14.1: Religious Independent; for others, see § Subchannels

Ownership
- Owner: Good News Broadcasting Network, Inc.

History
- Founded: August 19, 1988
- First air date: January 11, 1990
- Former call signs: K69FM (1988–1992); K67FE (1992–2002); K53GF (2002–2008); K38IZ-D (2008–2018)
- Former channel numbers: Analog: 69 (UHF, 1990–1992), 67 (UHF, 1992–2002), 53 (UHF, 2002–2008); Digital: 38 (UHF, 2008–2018)
- Former affiliations: inTV (1996–1999); KWHY-TV translator (1999–2002)

Technical information
- Licensing authority: FCC
- Facility ID: 52892
- Class: LD
- ERP: 15 kW
- HAAT: 485 m (1,591 ft)
- Transmitter coordinates: 33°20′0.1″N 112°3′47.5″W

Links
- Public license information: LMS
- Website: www.gnbn.com

K14RK-D (channel 14) is a low-power religious television station in Phoenix, Arizona, United States, owned by Good News Broadcasting Network, Inc. The station's transmitter is located on South Mountain.

== History ==
The station began with an original construction permit for K69FM (channel 69), granted to Broadcasting Systems of Phoenix on August 19, 1988. The station was licensed on January 11, 1990, with city of license of South Phoenix. Early programming is unknown. In February 1991, the station was sold to Polar Broadcasting of Arizona, a San Francisco–based company, who shortly thereafter applied to move the station to channel 67 and change the city of license to Phoenix. The station licensed its new facilities and its callsign was changed to K67FE in December 1992.

In June 1996, the station was sold to Paxson Communications (now Ion Media Networks) and became part of the Infomall TV Network, or inTV. Paxson sold the station in August 1999 to Spanish Independent Broadcasting Network, who changed the programming to a simulcast of KWHY-TV (channel 22), a Spanish-language independent station in Los Angeles. The next year, needing to vacate the upper-700 MHz band (channels 60–69), the station applied for and was granted a permit to move to channel 53. The station was licensed in June 2002 as K53GF. Sometime later, it dropped the KWHY-TV rebroadcast and became an independent station, airing mostly movies and infomercials for local car dealerships.

In May 2005, K53GF received a request to vacate channel 53 from Aloha Partners, who were winners of the Federal Communications Commission (FCC) auction for the spectrum now occupied by channel 54. However, with the DTV conversion still in process, there were no suitable in-core channels to which K53GF could move their analog operations. Instead, they requested to operate as a low-power digital TV station on channel 38 and the FCC granted a construction permit in October 2005 to build low-power DTV station K38IZ-D. In the meantime, Aloha Partners had not launched its proposed service to Public Safety, and K53GF remained on the air on analog channel 53 until May 2010. Aloha Partners and its channel 54/59 spectrum were acquired on February 4, 2008, by AT&T Mobility.

On October 27, 2008, the station filed for special temporary authorization (STA) to continue broadcasting the analog signal until 2009. The station began digital operation under program test authority on October 30, 2008.

== Subchannels ==
The station's signal is multiplexed:

Subchannels of K14RK-D
Subchannel	Res.	Short name	Programming
14.1	1080i	GoodNws	Good News TV
14.2	720p	GNTVLat	GNTV Latino
14.3	480i	GNTVKid	GNTV Kids
14.4	480i	GNMusic	Music videos
14.7	480i	K14RK-7	[Blank]
