= Christine Craft =

American broadcaster

- Born: 1944 (age 81–82); Canton, Ohio, U.S.
- Education: University of California, Santa Barbara (BA); University of the Pacific (JD)
- Occupations: Lawyer, journalist, news anchor

Christine Craft (born 1944) is an American attorney, radio talk show host and former television news anchor. She became known in the broadcast industry in the 1980s for her age and sexual discrimination lawsuit against a television station that had demoted her from news anchor to reporter.

== Early life ==
Craft was born in Canton, Ohio. Her parents were Willard A. Craft, a high school administrator and Christine A. Leininger, an actress. After graduating from college with a degree in English in 1966, she spent time as a classroom teacher and competitive surfer in the Santa Barbara area.

== TV career ==
In 1974, Craft took a position as a weather reporter at KSBW-TV in Salinas, California. While working for KSBW, she served in a variety of reporting roles, including news reporting and sports. She then moved from KSBW to the CBS affiliate KPIX, in San Francisco.

In 1977, CBS Sports hired Craft to host a weekly segment, "Women in Sports", for the CBS Sports Spectacular. As part of her on-air reporting, she was required by CBS to undergo a make-over which included having her hair bleached platinum blonde; Craft later stated that she hated the experience.

After a year at CBS, Craft returned to local news, first with a stint as co-anchor for ABC affiliate KEYT-TV in Santa Barbara, California. In 1980 Craft moved to Kansas City, Missouri to work for the then-Metromedia-owned ABC affiliate, KMBC-TV. Craft claims that unbeknownst to her, a media consulting company produced a tape of her and had it shopped around to several stations throughout the country, including KMBC-TV. As a result of this exposure, executives at the station requested Craft come to Kansas City for an interview; following the interview, she was hired. Craft states that at the time of her hiring she told the station management she "showed signs of her age and experience", and after the experience with CBS, was not willing to once again be "made over".

== Lawsuit ==
In January 1981 Craft became co-anchor with Scott Feldman on the 6 p.m. and 10 p.m. newscast on KMBC-TV. Following the addition of Craft to the news program, the station's newscasts went from third to first in the ratings. Eight months into her two-year contract, Craft was removed from the anchor position in August 1981 after a focus group had determined she was "too old, too unattractive and wouldn't defer to men." Craft refused to accept the demotion, and went public with her disagreement with the station through an interview in a local newspaper. She left KMBC and returned to doing television in Santa Barbara.

Craft filed a Title VII lawsuit against Metromedia, and in 1983, a federal jury in Kansas City awarded her $500,000 in damages. A federal judge overturned the award and ordered a second trial, this time in Joplin, Missouri. The second jury also awarded her $500,000. Metromedia appealed and the 8th Circuit Court subsequently overturned the decision. Craft's appeal of that decision to the United States Supreme Court was denied, although Supreme Court Judge Sandra Day O'Connor did write in favor of hearing the case. Several employment-law references include her case as an example of Title VII discrimination lawsuits.

== Authorship, law school and talk-radio ==
In 1983, the American Humanist Association awarded Craft the Humanist Heroine Award.

In 1986, she published her semi-autobiographical book, Too Old, Too Ugly, Not Deferential to Men. Craft continued doing television, anchoring the news at KRBK in Sacramento where she was also managing editor and went on to do television programs for San Francisco's KQED. Craft then went to law school, graduating in 1995 from the University of the Pacific's McGeorge School of Law, passing the California Bar exam that same year. It was during her studies in law school when Craft first started working in talk-radio, hosting a program at KFBK, in Sacramento.

== Current life ==
In the fall of 2007, Craft left her hosting duties at KSAC in Sacramento after a failure to reach a new contract agreement with the station manager. She went on to practice worker's compensation and employment law at the law offices of Farrell, Fraulob and Brown in Sacramento.

She also performs work in the animal abuse field pro-bono and argues for stronger statutes against such crimes. Her story was featured in an exhibit at the Newseum, an interactive museum of news and journalism located in Washington, D.C.
