= Nuestra Visión =

Spanish-language television network in the United States

- Type: Television network
- Country: United States
- Broadcast area: National (via digital terrestrial television in some markets)
- Headquarters: Miami, Florida

Programming
- Picture format: 1080i (HDTV); 480i (SDTV)

Ownership
- Owner: América Móvil
- Parent: Publicidad y Contenido Editorial S.A. de C.V.
- Key people: Victor Herrera (CEO of Nuestra Visión); Stephano Herrera (Vice-president)

History
- Founded: January 17, 2017; 9 years ago
- Launched: November 21, 2017; 8 years ago
- Founder: Carlos Slim

Links
- Website: nuestravision.tv

Nuestra Visión (translation: Our Vision) is an American Spanish language free-to-air television network, owned by Publicidad y Contenido Editorial S.A. de C.V. a subsidiary of América Móvil. The network launched on November 21, 2017 and is available in select markets across the United States.

The network primarily features Mexican movies from the golden age of Mexican cinema to recent productions. Programming also includes live sporting events as well as special events, such as concerts, interviews with top-tier celebrities, series and music clips. It also airs daily newscasts and sportscasts produced live through companies owned by América Móvil, UNO TV and Claro Sports.

== History ==
The plans to launch Nuestra Visión were first revealed on January 17, 2017 by Mexican billionaire Carlos Slim's telecommunications corporation, America Movil. The network's strategy was to specifically target the millions of Mexican Americans living in the United States, as revealed by CEO Víctor Herrera in a statement. The network launched on November 21, 2017, with only five affiliated stations

By 2019 it more than doubled its coverage and is available in over 4.2 million homes. In order to make the network available to everyone in the United States, the network launched an app on September 16, 2019, coinciding with Mexican Independence Day.

In August 2020, the network was added to the line-up of the Pluto TV streaming service. As of the summer of 2022, it became part of the ViX lineup.

== Programming ==
Nuestra Visión's programming consists of Mexican movie libraries, composed of over 2,300 movie titles, spanning from the Golden Age of Mexican cinema to recent productions. Nuestra Vision also features sports programming, including live games from Ascenso MX and Liga MX Femenil, as well as American football, boxing, CMLL wrestling, baseball, and mixed martial arts. The network also features sports news and content, and news produced live from Mexico by Claro Sports and UNO TV respectively. Nuestra Visión also features shows and interviews with top-tier Mexican and International talent and celebrities. Additionally, the network offers productions from Claro that target different types of audiences, ranging from young Latin adults to seniors, with content rating from TV-G to TV-MA.

=== Current programming ===
==== Talk/lifestyle/reality shows ====
- Aprende:
- Dress Code
- El Libro Rojo
- La Caja de Pandora
- Noctámbulos, Historias De Una Noche
- Palabra de Cine

==== News programming ====
- Marca Claro Radio en Vivo
- Noticias en Vivo Gabriela Calzada
- Noticias en Vivo José Cárdenas

==== Scripted programming ====
- El Torito
- ¡Yo Soy Yo!: Dar El Primer Paso

==== Music programming ====
- Domingo estelar

==== Children programming ====
- Cantinflas show

==== Sports programming ====
Sports talk

- Deportes en Claro
- Deportes en Claro Matutino
- Game Plan LFA
- Jugando Claro en Vivo
- Vidas extraordinarias

Sporting events

- Ascenso MX
- Liga MX Femenil
- Liga de Fútbol Americano Profesional
- Consejo Mundial de Lucha Libre
- Nuestro Box

== Affiliates ==
Nuestra Visión is available over the air. At launch on November 21, 2017, it had just five affiliate stations; it now has eleven. As of September 2019, it is available in 4.2 million homes across the United States.

=== List of affiliates ===
City	Station	Virtual channel	Owner	Notes
==== Arizona ====
Phoenix	KDVD-LD	50.1	Globe LPTV	
==== Arkansas ====
Fayetteville	K28NT-D	48.2	Victory Communications, Inc.	
==== California ====
Fresno	KHSC-LD	32.1	Cocola Broadcasting	
Palm Springs	KVPS-LD	8.2		
Los Angeles	KSCN-TV	63.2/3	Meruelo Broadcasting	
San Diego	KSDY-LD	50.1	International Communications Network Inc.	
==== Washington ====
Yakima	KWYT-LD	36.2	Hispanavision	
