= KCET Studios =

Film studio in Hollywood, California

Coordinates: 34.097322°N 118.284745°W

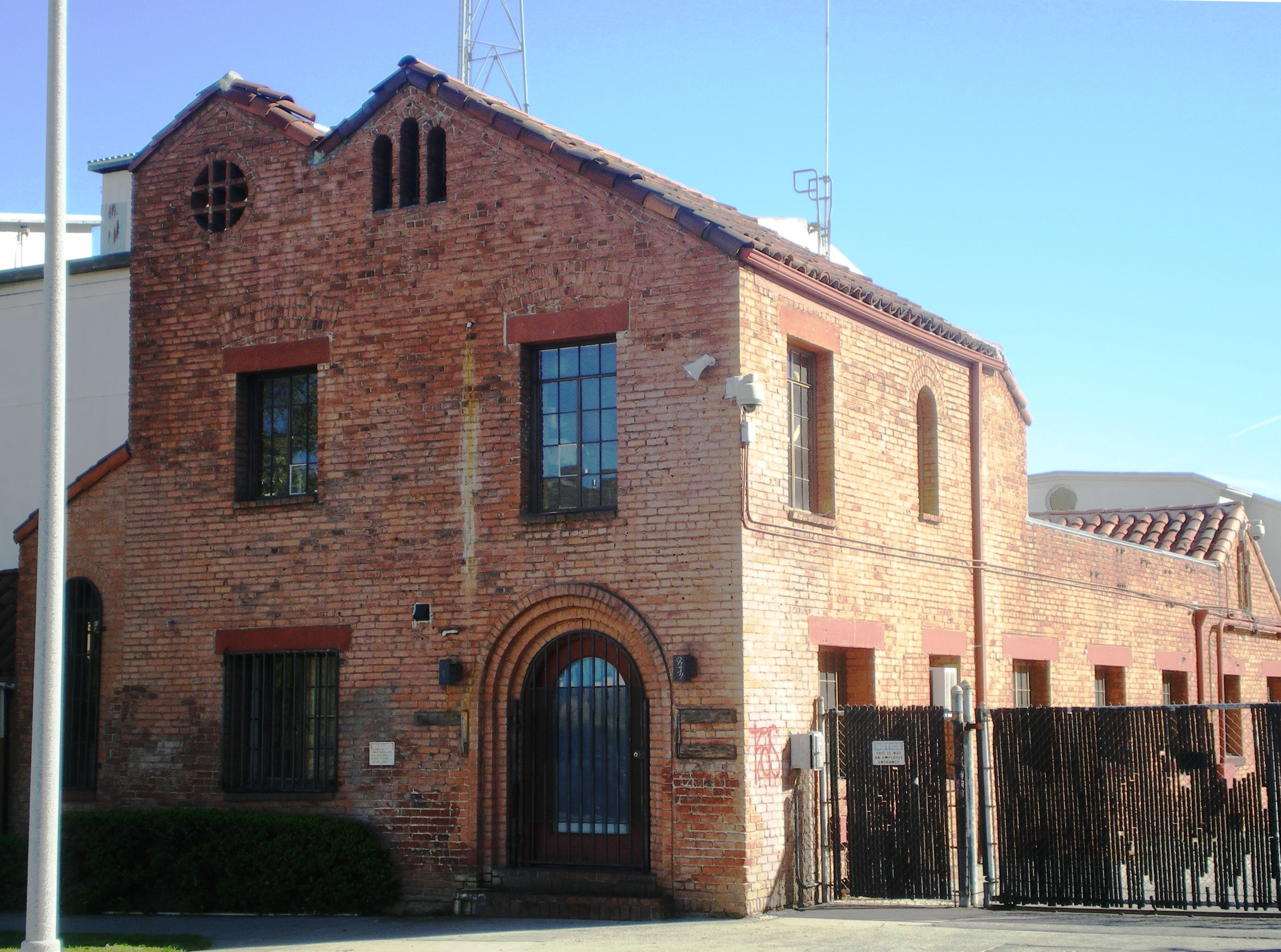
- Administration building erected by Charles Ray in 1922

- Location within the Los Angeles metropolitan area
- Location: 4401 Sunset Boulevard; Hollywood, California; 90027

History
- Built: 1912

Site notes
- Governing body: private

Los Angeles Historic-Cultural Monument
- Designated: 1978
- Reference no.: 198

The KCET Studios, located at 4401 Sunset Boulevard in Hollywood, California is the longest continuously producing studio in Hollywood. Since its establishment in 1912, the studios located at the site have been the home of motion picture producers, including Lubin, Essanay, Willis and Inglis, J.D. Hampton, Charles Ray, Ralph Like, Monogram Pictures, Allied Artists, and ColorVision. Since 1970, it has been the home of public television station KCET, but in April 2011, KCET announced that it had sold the facility to the Church of Scientology.

== Early years ==
In 1912, Siegmund Lubin, a film producer from Philadelphia, built the first film studio on the site of what is now KCET Studios. Lubin's company, called Lubin Manufacturing Company, produced educational films at the site, including "An Alligator Farm" (1912) and "An Ostrich and Pigeon Farm." In 1913, Lubin sold the studio to the Chicago-based Essanay Film Company. Essanay produced 20 one-reel Westerns before selling the site to the Kalem Company. Kalem began operating at the lot in late 1913, and Marshall Neilan began working at the site in the Spring of 1914. The "Ham and Bud" comedy series was shot there from late 1914 through February 1917. At that time, Kalem relocated to Glendale and abandoned the Fleming Street studios. In 1917, Willis and Inglis acquired the studio and rented space for use by independent producers. Wallis and Inglis build a 65-foot (20 m) by 11-foot (3.4 m) outdoor stage and a 50-foot (15 m) by 100-foot (30 m) indoor stage. During this time, The Marine Film Corporation filmed "Lorelei of the Sea" at the studios, and comedian Fay Tincher made a series of two-reel comedies there.

In August 1918, Jesse D. Hampton began renting space from Willis and Inglis. And in March 1919, Willis and Inglis built another station that became known as Hampton Studio. In April 1919, a trade magazine reported: "The entire frontage along Fleming Street, heretofore adorned by a blank wall, is now occupied with a long row of offices filled with workers and other functionaries necessary to the operation of the big place." Hampton made more than 25 films at the site from 1918 to 1920.

In 1920, actor Charles Ray purchased the studios and built many of the red brick buildings that still survive at the site. When Ray's new soundstage was completed, Moving Picture News called it "the last word in studio construction" and noted: "Perhaps the most striking feature of the studios is the glass enclosed stage, topped by a glass roof. The sides may be removed to permit openings when the shooting of street scenes is required . . . The placing of a tank beneath the stage was a unique arrangement . . . the installation of electrical equipment will insure a wealth of sunshine for daylight pictures as well as for night scenes." Ray's soundstage remains in use as KCET's Studio A. In 1922, Ray also added a Spanish-style, red brick administration building (pictured in infobox above) that is still in use by KCET.

With a budget of $800,000, Ray shot his epic film, The Courtship of Myles Standish, at the site. The most famed extravagance created for the production was a life-size replica of the Mayflower and a pool of water with a mechanism to rock the ship back and forth. The film was a flop at the box office, and by 1923, Charles Ray Productions was bankrupt.

After Charles Ray's production company went bankrupt, the Bank of Italy became the receiver for the property and rented studio space to independent producers. The bank changed the studio's address from 1425 Fleming Street to 4401 Sunset Boulevard and renamed it the Sunset Studio. Actress Jean Navelle bought the studio from the bank in 1927, but her production company ceased operations in late 1929, and the studio was returned to the Bank of Italy.

== Ralph M. Like ==
Ralph M. Like was an engineer who developed a system for recording sound on film. He leased space at the site as far back as 1926, and in 1932, he leased the entire studio for use by his company International Recording Engineers. Like built a new soundstage, the present Stage B, in 1932. In 1933, Like's mother bought the studio from the Bank of Italy. Through the 1930s, many westerns were shot at the studio. In 1937, John Ford directed "Hurricane)" there. The studio facilities were improved in the late 1930s and early 1940s, and adjoining land was acquired to build dock sets, a city street set, a third sound stage, and a costume department.

== Monogram Pictures and Allied Artists ==
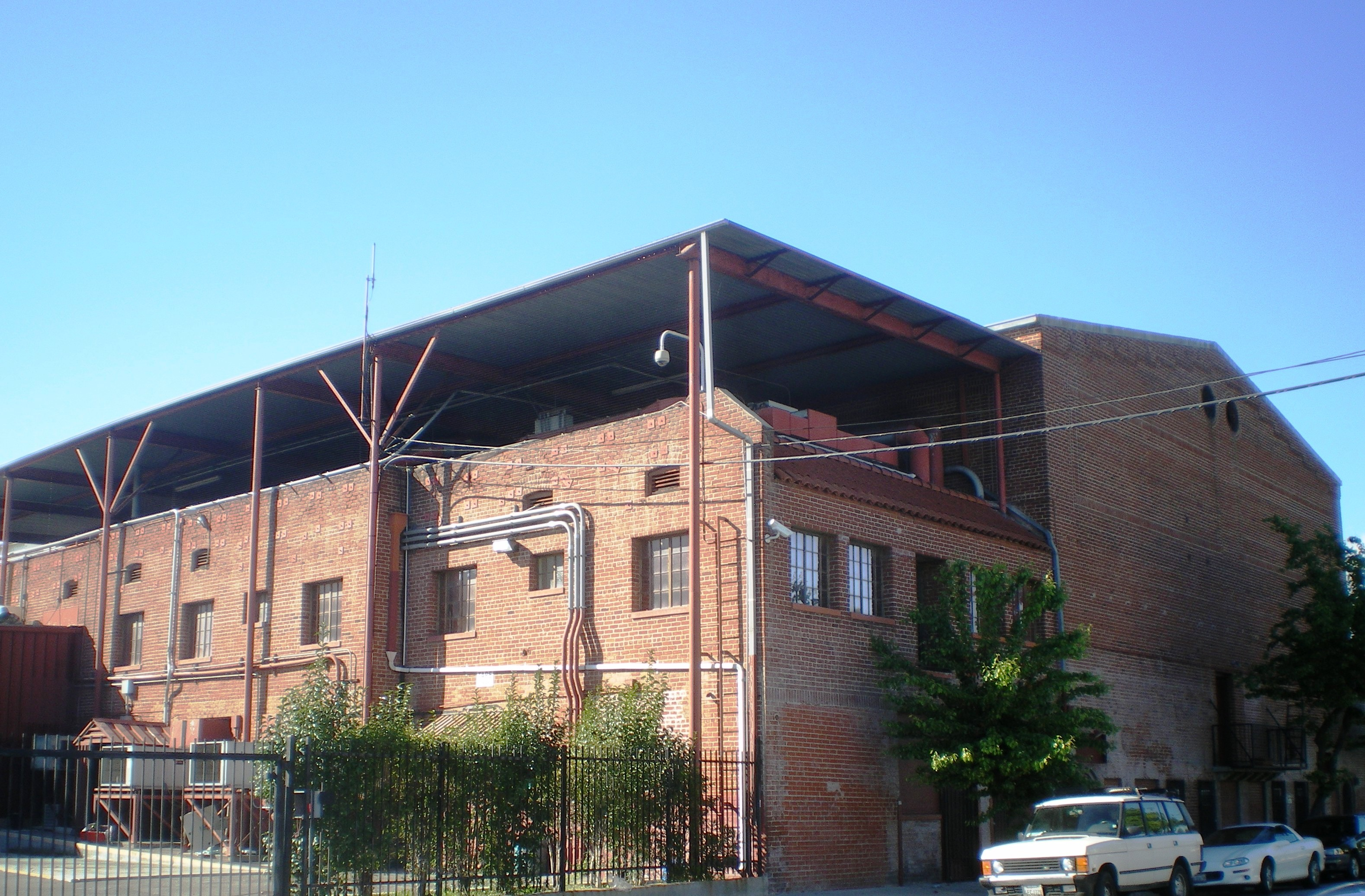
Brick soundstages built in the 1920s

Monogram Pictures began renting space at the studio in the late 1930s and bought the property from Like in 1943. Monogram Pictures was a small studio that made B-Movies. Monogram's features included film series featuring "Charlie Chan," the "East Side Kids," "The Bowery Boys," "Bomba, the Jungle Boy," "Joe Palooka," "The Range Busters," and "The Cisco Kid," and westerns featuring Tex Ritter. Allied Artists followed Mongram at the site, where it produced both motion pictures and television programs in the 1950s and 1960s. The motion pictures filmed at the Sunset Boulevard studios during the Mongram and Allied Artists years include the following:

- Smart Alecks (1942) with Leo Gorcey, Huntz Hall, Maxie Rosenbloom and Gale Storm
- It Happened on Fifth Avenue (1947) with Don DeFore, Ann Harding, Charles Ruggles, Victor Moore, and Gale Storm
- Black Gold (1947) with Anthony Quinn
- The Babe Ruth Story (1948) starring William Bendix and Claire Trevor
- Kidnapped (1948) starring Roddy McDowell
- Triggerman (1948) with Johnny Mack Brown
- Yukon Gold (1952) with Kirby Grant, Martha Hyer and Chinook: The Wonder Dog
- Killer Leopard (1954) with Bomba, the Jungle Boy (Johnny Sheffield) and Beverly Garland
- Two Guns and a Badge (1954) with Wayne Morris and Beverly Garland
- Riot in Cell Block 11 (1954) starring Neville Brand and Leo Gordon
- Shack Out on 101 (1955) with Frank Lovejoy, Terry Moore, Keenan Wynn and Lee Marvin
- Invasion of the Body Snatchers (1956) – the science fiction classic directed by Don Siegel
- Friendly Persuasion (1956) with Gary Cooper, Dorothy McGuire, and Anthony Perkins
- Love in the Afternoon (1957) with Gary Cooper and Audrey Hepburn
- The Oklahoman (1957) with Joel McCrea and Barbara Hale
- Queen of Outer Space (1958) with Zsa Zsa Gabor
- House on Haunted Hill (1959) with Vincent Price
- Al Capone (1959) starring Rod Steiger and Martin Balsam
- Sex Kittens Go to College (1960) starring Mamie Van Doren, Tuesday Weld and Martin Milner
- El Cid (1961) starring Charlton Heston and Sophia Loren
- Tickle Me (1965) with Elvis Presley

In 1964, financial difficulties forced Allied Artists to cease production activities and to become a film distribution company. The company moved its operations to New York, and the studios were used mostly for production of television program and commercials from 1964 to 1967. In 1967, ColorVision purchased the studio and continued to rent space for independent productions. ColorVision itself went bankrupt in 1969.

== KCET ==
In July 1970, the 3.5-acre (14,000 m^{2}) site was purchased by Los Angeles public television station KCET for $800,000. In November 1971, KCET dedicated its renovated $3.2 million studio facilities. At the time, the studios were the largest in public television and were intended to be used as the West Coast production center for public television. In 1975, KCET announced plans to build a new $1.5 million brick administration building on the site. KCET has used the Sunset Boulevard studio facilities to create numerous productions, including Carl Sagan's acclaimed series Cosmos, Steve Allen's Meeting of Minds, the children's program The Puzzle Place, California's Gold, and Visiting...with Huell Howser.

In 1979, while demonstrating a karate kick, a KCET employee kicked a hole in the wall. A maintenance manager assigned to repair the hole noticed an arched brick wall and column behind the wallboard. The wallboard was removed and uncovered the ornate exterior of a little theater built in the 1920s. The exterior, consisting of two brick facades and six columns, had been built in the silent era and was later covered with wallboard to improve the acoustics for screening sound pictures.

In March 2011, the Los Angeles Times reported that KCET was in negotiations to sell the studio to the Church of Scientology. On April 25, 2011, KCET confirmed the sale, at an undisclosed price ($42,000,420 according to accessor records), with an expectation that KCET would relocate to other production facilities in about one year. The Church of Scientology said that it expected to use the facilities to produce videos and internet content, and would use its satellite uplink facilities for high definition video transmissions.

Aside from its own programming, KCET Studios was the filming location of two lottery game shows, The Big Spin from the California Lottery, and Powerball: The Game Show from the Multi-State Lottery Association, both produced by veteran game show producer Jonathan Goodson, son of legendary game show creator Mark Goodson.

== See also ==
- Scientology Network
- Los Angeles Historic-Cultural Monuments in Hollywood and Los Feliz
