= KCOY-TV =

Television station in Santa Maria, California

- Santa Maria–San Luis Obispo–; Santa Barbara, California; United States
- City: Santa Maria, California
- Channels: Digital: 19 (UHF); Virtual: 12
- Branding: Telemundo Costa Central; News Channel 11 (12.2); Central Coast CW (12.3)

Programming
- Affiliations: 12.1: Telemundo; 12.2: Fox; 12.3: The CW Plus; for others, see § Subchannels

Ownership
- Owner: VistaWest Media, LLC; (VistaWest California, LLC)
- Operator: News-Press & Gazette Company
- Sister stations: KEYT-TV, KKFX-CD

History
- First air date: March 16, 1964
- Former channel numbers: Analog: 12 (VHF, 1964–2009)
- Former affiliations: NBC (1964–1969); CBS (secondary 1964–1969, primary 1969–2021); Dabl (2021–2023)
- Call sign meaning: Station was the sister station to KCOY radio, named in honor of Frank McCoy, founder of the Santa Maria Inn (Note: Frank McCoy is also the namesake of McCoy Lane, on which the station's main studio is located.)

Technical information
- Licensing authority: FCC
- Facility ID: 63165
- ERP: 130 kW
- HAAT: 579 m (1,900 ft)
- Transmitter coordinates: 34°54′37″N 120°11′13″W
- Translator(s): KKFX-CD 24 San Luis Obispo

Links
- Public license information: Public file; LMS

KCOY-TV (channel 12) is a television station licensed to Santa Maria, California, United States, serving the Central Coast of California as an affiliate of Telemundo and The CW. It is owned by VistaWest Media, LLC and operated by the News-Press & Gazette Company (NPG) alongside Santa Barbara–licensed ABC/CBS affiliate KEYT-TV (channel 3) and Fox affiliate KKFX-CD (channel 24). KCOY-TV and KKFX-CD share studios on West McCoy Lane in Santa Maria; KEYT-TV maintains separate facilities on TV Hill, overlooking downtown Santa Barbara. KCOY-TV's transmitter is located on Tepusquet Peak east of Santa Maria. KKFX-CD broadcasts the same subchannels in the San Luis Obispo area.

Channel 12 was added to Santa Maria as a result of the Federal Communications Commission deciding to deintermix Fresno by forcing that city's lone VHF station, KFRE-TV, to a UHF channel and removing channel 12 from Fresno. Four groups applied, and Central Coast Television—a consortium of local residents—was granted the construction permit to build the station in 1963. KCOY-TV began broadcasting as an NBC affiliate on March 16, 1964. In 1968, half of the company was purchased by Dale Moore of Missoula, Montana; the station switched affiliations to CBS the next year, and the local investors bought back Moore's stake in 1971. Under the ownership of Stauffer Communications from 1980 to 1995, KCOY-TV remained the second-rated local news outlet on the southern Central Coast in the 1980s and 1990s; the present Santa Maria studio building was completed in 1988. When Stauffer was purchased by Morris Communications in 1995, the combined firm immediately spun off its television holdings, mostly to Benedek Broadcasting; the station then changed hands three times in twelve years.

In 2013, the News-Press & Gazette Company assumed some of KCOY-TV's operations and acquired outright most of the Cowles Company's Central Coast media holdings. The two stations' newsrooms were merged. The KCOY-TV license was sold to VistaWest Media, a company controlled by NPG's president and general manager. On January 1, 2021, NPG moved the CBS affiliation to a subchannel of KEYT-TV, still branded as "NewsChannel 12". KCOY-TV then broadcast Dabl, a diginet, until 2023, when the company acquired the Telemundo affiliation from KTAS and moved its main signal to KCOY-TV. The Telemundo channel offers regional newscasts shared with NPG's Telemundo affiliate in the Monterey–Salinas area, KMUV-LD. In 2024, The CW moved to KCOY-TV and KKFX-CD.

== History ==
=== Channel 12 comes to Santa Maria ===
In July 1960, the Federal Communications Commission (FCC) ordered television station KFRE-TV in Fresno to move from channel 12 to channel 30 as part of a years-long debate over deintermixture—the conversion of markets with both very high frequency (VHF) and ultra high frequency (UHF) stations to all-UHF. The FCC then sought to relocate channel 12 to a city on the southern Central Coast: it listed Lompoc, Santa Barbara, San Luis Obispo, and Santa Maria as options. By November 1961, the FCC had designated a comparative hearing for the four groups which had applied for the channel: the Santa Maria Telecasting Corporation, M & M Telecasters, Thomas B. Friedman, and Central Coast Television Corporation. In May 1962, Friedman withdrew from the contest, citing work; M & M had already withdrawn, leaving Santa Maria Telecasting and Central Coast Television competing for the channel.

Central Coast Television was favored in the initial decision by FCC hearing examiner Herbert Sharfman, released in December 1962, on the grounds of its local ownership and their involvement in civic affairs. Santa Maria Telecasting appealed, but the commission affirmed Sharfman's decision and awarded the construction permit to Central Coast Television in September 1963. The company stated that it would be on air in January 1964 from a transmitter site on Tepusquet Peak. The station took the call sign KCOY-TV; two of the partners in Central Coast Television, James Ranger and Ed Zuchelli, owned KCOY radio.

KCOY-TV signed on March 16, 1964. It was an affiliate of NBC that also carried some CBS programs, but it was not a regular affiliate of NBC until September 1965. The next year, ownership in the company changed twice; Ed Zuchelli exited the operating partnership, while Helen Pedotti joined it. Pedotti did not have television at her home when she bought into the station.

Also in 1965, KCOY-TV filed with the FCC to relocate its transmitter to Broadcast Peak, northwest of Goleta. This site was further from Santa Maria than Tepusquet Peak by some 25 miles (40 km). On these grounds, KEYT, the television station in Santa Barbara, protested to the FCC, believing that it encroached on their coverage area and represented a turn away from the owners' original promise to serve Santa Maria when they filed for the channel. The matter was designated for hearing in February 1966, and in November 1967, an FCC hearing examiner recommended approval of this application. KEYT appealed this decision to the FCC's review board. Central Coast Television asked for expedited processing of the appeal and a bypass of the review board, saying that it had lost money for its entire existence and could be forced to go off the air soon.

With the Broadcast Peak move still pending at the review board, Central Coast Television filed in April 1968 to sell the station to Central Coast Broadcasters, a company half-owned by the local investors and half by Dale G. Moore of Missoula, Montana. Six months later, the review board denied KCOY-TV's application to move its transmitter. In doing so, it also cited the degradation of the proposed KCOY-TV signal in part of the Santa Maria area, which Central Coast claimed consisted of a trailer park and airport, and ascribed KCOY-TV's losses not to poor coverage but to undercapitalization and a "very heavy debt structure". On January 12, 1969, KCOY-TV became a primary CBS affiliate, though it continued to carry some NBC shows; KSBY in San Luis Obispo did the opposite.

=== Stauffer Communications ownership ===
In 1980, Stauffer Communications of Topeka, Kansas, acquired KCOY-TV from Central Coast Broadcasters for $7 million. For Stauffer, the deal marked a return to Santa Maria, as the company had owned the Santa Maria Times newspaper between 1948 and 1957.

The KCOY studios at the corner of Skyway Drive and McCoy Lane in Santa Maria

Having outgrown the original studios on McClelland Street, Stauffer began planning a new studio facility in 1987; the new site would offer room for more staff and another satellite dish. Construction took place in 1988.

As the southern Central Coast did not have a Fox affiliate, KCOY continued to carry NFL football from the NFL on Fox beginning in 1994, after CBS had lost football rights. This continued until January 1997, when a new low-power station in San Luis Obispo, KKFX-LP (channel 11), was launched by KEYT owner Smith Broadcasting.

KCOY made local news in 1995 when it hired Rick Martel, who had been a popular anchor at market-leading KSBY-TV, to anchor its evening newscasts. Martel had left the San Luis Obispo station after it was purchased by Elisabeth Murdoch.

=== Changing owners ===
In 1995, Stauffer sold its holdings to Morris Communications. Morris kept the company's newspapers and spun off most of the television stations to Benedek Broadcasting of Rockford, Illinois, for $60 million. One of Benedek's first moves was to fire Martel as anchor, even though Morris had renewed his contract just two months prior. Martel had increased the station's news ratings, but only slightly, and Benedek wished to go in a new direction.

Benedek reached an agreement to swap with the Ackerley Group in December 1998; Ackerley acquired KCOY-TV, while Benedek acquired KKTV in Colorado Springs, Colorado. KCOY-TV was the primary prize for Ackerley, which owned stations in other central California markets. For Benedek, the move made geographic sense, as the Santa Maria station was its only outlet in the Pacific Time Zone. Ackerley acquired KKFX in 2000. In 2002, Ackerley was bought out by Clear Channel Communications (now iHeartMedia).

=== Cowles ownership ===
Clear Channel sold its television stations in a deal announced in 2007 to Newport Television, a broadcasting holding company controlled by the private equity firm Providence Equity Partners. The sale was finalized on March 14, 2008; however, Providence Equity Partners owned 19 percent of Univision and thus had to sell stations in multiple California markets. The Cowles Company of Spokane, Washington, had agreed months before the deal closed to acquire KCOY, KKFX-CA, and the Clear Channel TV station in Monterey (KION-TV); this transaction closed on May 7, 2008.

In January 2012, Cowles announced a round of cost-cutting measures at its California stations. KCOY–KKFX bore the brunt of the cutbacks; sports coverage was eliminated, the morning show was pared back to an hour in length, and the evening newscasts began to be presented from Salinas. Thirteen employees were laid off, including chief meteorologist Jim Byrne and sports anchor Kevin Roose, although weeknight anchor Arturo Santiago and sports anchor Dave Alley each remained as Santa Maria-based reporters. The move came just seven months after Cowles invested in converting the Santa Maria newsroom to high-definition, making KCOY–KKFX the first high-definition newscasts in the market. Byrne sued Cowles, claiming breach of contract; the parties settled out of court.

=== Consolidation with NPG ===
On September 20, 2013, News-Press & Gazette Company, owner of KEYT-TV in Santa Barbara, announced that it would take over some of KCOY's operations (including its news operation) under a shared services agreement. NPG acquired KKFX-CA, as well as KION-TV and Telemundo affiliate KMUV-LP in the Monterey–Salinas market, directly. The sale was completed on December 13. On December 26, Cowles composed a deal to sell KCOY to VistaWest Media, a company based in St. Joseph, Missouri (where NPG is also based); the station was to remain operated by NPG under a shared services agreement. VistaWest's president, Lyle Leimkuhler, had previously been an NPG employee. The sale was completed on January 30, 2015.

On January 1, 2021, the CBS affiliation was moved to the second subchannel of ABC-affiliated sister station KEYT-TV, with Dabl moving from 12.4 to the main 12.1 channel. KCOY's main channel (and the second subchannel of KKFX-CD) switched on February 1, 2023, from Dabl to the Spanish-language Telemundo network, with NPG taking over the affiliation from KTAS, a Spanish-language station based in Santa Maria. In addition, NPG began broadcasting its existing Telemundo newscasts from the Monterey–Salinas market on the southern Central Coast.

On July 31, 2024, it was announced that KCOY-TV would affiliate with The CW, taking the affiliation from KSBY. Previously, the E. W. Scripps Company—owner of KSBY—had opted not to renew any of its remaining CW affiliations in seven markets.

== Notable former on-air staff ==
- Lee Cowan – anchor and reporter in the 1990s
- Rick DeBruhl – anchor and producer in the late 1970s
- Lon McEachern – sports anchor and reporter in the 1980s
- David Kerley – anchor and producer

== Technical information ==
=== Subchannels ===
KCOY-TV's transmitter is located on Tepusquet Peak east of Santa Maria.

Subchannels of KCOY-TV and KKFX-CD
Subchannel		Res.	Short name	Programming
KCOY-TV	KKFX-CD	Res.	Short name	Programming
12.1	24.2	1080i	KCOY-TV	Telemundo
12.2	24.1	720p	FOX-HD	Fox
12.3	24.3	720p	CW+	The CW Plus
12.4	24.4	480i	ION+	Ion Plus
12.5	24.5	480i	MYSTERY	Ion Mystery
12.6	24.6	480i	DABL	Dabl

=== Analog-to-digital conversion ===
KCOY-TV shut down its analog signal, over VHF channel 12, on February 17, 2009, the original target date on which full-power television stations in the United States were to transition from analog to digital broadcasts. The station's digital signal remained on its pre-transition UHF channel 19, using virtual channel 12.
