= KKFX-CD =

Television station in San Luis Obispo, California

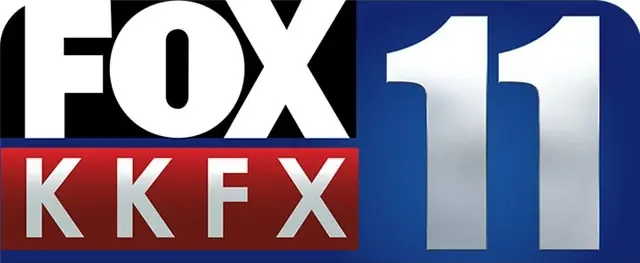
- San Luis Obispo–Santa Maria– Santa Barbara, California; United States
- City: San Luis Obispo, California
- Channels: Digital: 24 (UHF); Virtual: 24
- Branding: Fox 11; NewsChannel 11 (cable channel); Telemundo Costa Central (24.2); Central Coast CW (24.3)

Programming
- Affiliations: 24.1: Fox; 24.2: Telemundo; 24.3: The CW Plus

Ownership
- Owner: News-Press & Gazette Company; (NPG of California, LLC)
- Sister stations: KEYT-TV, KCOY-TV

History
- First air date: January 20, 1997
- Former call signs: K24EJ (1995–2000); KKFX-LP (2000–2001); KKFX-CA (2001–2015)
- Former channel numbers: Analog: 24 (UHF, 1998–2015)

Technical information
- Licensing authority: FCC
- Facility ID: 33870
- ERP: 0.325 kW
- HAAT: 445 m (1,460 ft)
- Transmitter coordinates: 35°21′37.9″N 120°39′24.6″W
- Translator(s): KCOY-TV 12.2 Santa Maria

Links
- Public license information: Public file; LMS
- Website: www.keyt.com

KKFX-CD (channel 24, cable channel 11) is a low-power, Class A television station licensed to San Luis Obispo, California, United States, serving the Central Coast of California as an affiliate of the Fox network. It is owned by the News-Press & Gazette Company (NPG) alongside Santa Barbara–based ABC/CBS affiliate KEYT-TV (channel 3) and co-managed with Santa Maria–licensed Telemundo/CW affiliate KCOY-TV (channel 12). KKFX-CD and KCOY-TV share studios at West McCoy Lane and Skyway Drive in Santa Maria north of Santa Maria Public Airport; KEYT-TV maintains separate facilities on Miramonte Drive on TV Hill, overlooking downtown Santa Barbara. KKFX-CD's transmitter is located atop Cuesta Ridge north of San Luis Obispo; it and KCOY-TV, which covers the southern portion of the market from Tepusquet Peak in the Los Padres National Forest, carry the same major subchannels.

== History ==
The Fox television network had no affiliate on the southern Central Coast, but KTTV of Los Angeles was available on cable. When Fox gained the rights to telecast NFL football from CBS in 1994, Santa Maria–based CBS affiliate KCOY-TV reached a secondary affiliation agreement to continue presenting football to its viewers. To fill this gap and provide a regional Fox affiliate, attorney William Reyner and the Smith Broadcasting Group, owner of Santa Barbara ABC affiliate KEYT-TV, teamed in December 1996 to launch KKFX. Originally broadcast on channel 11 and appearing on channel 11 or 24 on cable, the station debuted on January 20, 1997—in time to carry Super Bowl XXXI. This put Fox football telecasts out of reach of non-cable homes in San Luis Obispo County.

In 2000, Reyner sold KKFX to the Ackerley Group, owner of KCOY-TV, for $15.4 million. At the time of the sale, KKFX was airing a 10 p.m. newscast. In 2002, Ackerley was bought out by Clear Channel Communications (now iHeartMedia).

Clear Channel sold its television stations in a deal announced in 2007 to Newport Television, a broadcasting holding company controlled by the private equity firm Providence Equity Partners. The sale was finalized on March 14, 2008; however, Providence Equity Partners owned 19 percent of Univision and thus had to sell stations in multiple California markets. The Cowles Company of Spokane, Washington, had agreed months before the deal closed to acquire KCOY, KKFX-CA, and the Clear Channel TV station in Monterey (KION-TV); this transaction closed on May 7, 2008.

In January 2012, Cowles announced a round of cost-cutting measures at its California stations. KCOY–KKFX bore the brunt of the cutbacks; sports coverage was eliminated, the morning show was pared back to an hour in length, and the evening newscasts began to be presented from Salinas. Thirteen employees were laid off, including chief meteorologist Jim Byrne and sports anchor Kevin Roose, although weeknight anchor Arturo Santiago and sports anchor Dave Alley each remained as Santa Maria-based reporters. The move came just seven months after Cowles invested in converting the Santa Maria newsroom to high-definition, making KCOY–KKFX the first high-definition newscasts in the market. Byrne sued Cowles, claiming breach of contract; the parties settled out of court.

On September 20, 2013, News-Press & Gazette Company, owner of KEYT-TV, announced that it would take over some of KCOY's operations (including its news operation) under a shared services agreement. NPG acquired KKFX-CA directly. The sale was completed on December 13.

On January 20, 2015, KKFX began broadcasting over the air in high definition and providing a high-definition feed directly to cable and DirecTV. On that same date, KKFX-CA returned to the airwaves in Santa Barbara on low-power KSBB-CD channel 17.

== Newscasts ==
Fox 11 News in the Morning airs weekdays on KKFX from 7 to 9 a.m. A nightly hour-long newscast is included.

== Subchannels ==
Subchannels of KCOY-TV and KKFX-CD
| Subchannel | | Res. | Short name | Programming |
| KCOY-TV | KKFX-CD | Res. | Short name | Programming |
|---|---|---|---|---|
| 12.1 | 24.2 | 1080i | KCOY-TV | Telemundo |
| 12.2 | 24.1 | 720p | FOX-HD | Fox |
| 12.3 | 24.3 | 720p | CW+ | The CW Plus |
| 12.4 | 24.4 | 480i | ION+ | Ion Plus |
| 12.5 | 24.5 | 480i | MYSTERY | Ion Mystery |
| 12.6 | 24.6 | 480i | DABL | Dabl |

== See also ==
- Channel 11 branded TV stations in the United States
- Channel 24 low-power TV stations in the United States
