= KEYT-TV =

Television station in Santa Barbara, California

- Santa Barbara–Santa Maria–; San Luis Obispo, California; United States
- City: Santa Barbara, California
- Channels: Digital: 27 (UHF); Virtual: 3
- Branding: NewsChannel 3; NewsChannel 12 (3.2); News Now (3.3)

Programming
- Affiliations: 3.1: ABC; 3.2: CBS; 3.3: Independent with MyNetworkTV; for others, see § Subchannels

Ownership
- Owner: News-Press & Gazette Company; (NPG of California, LLC)
- Sister stations: KCOY-TV, KKFX-CD

History
- First air date: July 25, 1953
- Former call signs: KEYT (1953–1987)
- Former channel numbers: Analog: 3 (VHF, 1953–2009)
- Former affiliations: NBC (1953–1964); DuMont (secondary, 1953–1954); ABC (secondary, 1953–1964); CBS (secondary, 1953–1969)
- Call sign meaning: "Key to Television"

Technical information
- Licensing authority: FCC
- Facility ID: 60637
- ERP: 250 kW
- HAAT: 918 m (3,012 ft)
- Transmitter coordinates: 34°31′32″N 119°57′32″W
- Translator(s): see § Translators

Links
- Public license information: Public file; LMS
- Website: www.keyt.com

KEYT-TV (channel 3) is a television station licensed to Santa Barbara, California, United States, serving the Central Coast of California as an affiliate of ABC and CBS. It is owned by the News-Press & Gazette Company (NPG) alongside San Luis Obispo–licensed low-power, Class A Fox affiliate KKFX-CD (channel 24) and co-managed with Santa Maria–licensed Telemundo/CW affiliate KCOY-TV (channel 12). KEYT-TV's studios are located on Miramonte Drive on TV Hill, overlooking downtown Santa Barbara; KCOY-TV and KKFX-CD share separate facilities at West McCoy Lane and Skyway Drive in Santa Maria north of Santa Maria Public Airport. KEYT-TV's transmitter is located atop Broadcast Peak, between Santa Barbara and Santa Ynez in the Santa Ynez Mountains.

== History ==
=== Early years ===
KEYT-TV first signed on the air on July 26, 1953, after obtaining a construction permit from the Federal Communications Commission (FCC) on November 13, 1952. It was owned by the Santa Barbara Broadcasting & Television Corporation. Harry Butcher, who owned KIST (1340 AM), was a 14% owner of the new TV station.

During the 1950s, the station ran programming from all four TV networks: ABC, CBS, NBC and the DuMont Television Network. DuMont discontinued operations in 1956. The original owners sold the station to Key Television in May 1957, for $1.64 million. KEYT-TV lost its NBC affiliation in 1964 when KCOY-TV in nearby Santa Maria signed on. KEYT then shared CBS with KCOY until 1969, when the inclusion of San Luis Obispo County into the Santa Barbara—Santa Maria media market resulted in KEYT becoming exclusively affiliated with ABC. KCOY became the CBS affiliate, and KSBY in San Luis Obispo became the region's NBC affiliate. KEYT was purchased by Shamrock Broadcasting, a subsidiary of Shamrock Holdings, in June 1984.

=== Later developments ===
In September 1998, KEYT-TV owner Smith Broadcasting purchased radio station KTMS (1250 AM) for $1.6 million and launched an all-news format with new call letters KEYT to match those of its new TV sister. "KEYT 1250" featured news reports from the Associated Press and simulcasts of KEYT-TV newscasts. (The previous news/talk format and call letters of KTMS moved to 990 AM upon the sale to Smith.) The radio operation was a financial drain on Smith Broadcasting from the beginning, losing $1 million over five years, and the station was sold to Lazer Broadcasting in October 2003.

Between March and September 2007, as the station transitioned to a high definition signal, KEYT-HD was initially unavailable to cable subscribers in the Central Coast due to a carriage dispute with the local cable companies. KEYT eventually reached an agreement with Cox Communications in Santa Barbara, Comcast in Santa Maria, and Charter Cable in San Luis Obispo to carry its HDTV signal. In 2012, Time Warner Cable in Ventura County began carrying the HDTV signal.

On September 7, 2012, News-Press & Gazette Company announced that it had entered into an agreement to purchase KEYT-TV from Smith Media for $14.3 million. The transaction was approved by the FCC on November 6 and was completed on November 19, 2012. Smith Media had owned KEYT since 1987.

On January 28, 2013, KEYT retired the longtime KEY News branding and, with the new owner's purchase, rebranded as NewsChannel 3. The branding is similar to that of Palm Springs sister station KESQ-TV. KEYT's newscasts and site now include a graphics package that is similar to all NPG stations and is operated by Internet Broadcasting.

On April 1, 2013, KEYT began broadcasting its news in high definition. Up to that point, KEYT aired network and syndicated programming in HD but the newscasts were still in standard definition.

== News Now ==
"My RTV" logo, used from 2009 to 2017

When KEYT acquired the MyNetworkTV affiliation in June 2006, it initially showed only MyNetworkTV programming, with a test pattern running outside of network programming hours. By the fall of 2007, the station had managed to obtain syndication broadcast rights to Family Guy and South Park, and officially launched its second digital subchannel under the branding "MyNetworkTV Central Coast" in October 2007, replacing Los Angeles–based MyNetworkTV affiliate KCOP on all cable systems in the Central Coast region.

The subchannel initially ran a standard-definition simulcast of KEYT's primary channel outside of MyNetworkTV programming. On October 30, 2007, KEYT-DT2 added a secondary affiliation with the Luken Communications-owned Retro Television Network to RTV programming outside of MyNetworkTV prime time program slots. The subchannel subsequently changed its branding to "My RTN" to coincide with the new affiliation, later changing to "My RTV" after the network modified its on-air acronym to "RTV", then finally "My Retro TV".

On April 18, 2017, the 3.2 subchannel dropped Retro TV because station management was unsure of it continuing as a going concern with a declining affiliate base, along with contractual restrictions on using it as an overflow channel for breaking news. (Before that date, it was the only "Big Four" network affiliate nationwide left still carrying the network as a subchannel). In the interim, the station relaunched KEYT-DT2 as News Now, airing simulcasts and rebroadcasts of newscasts from KEYT-TV and KKFX-CD, along with live rolling coverage of local political events, news coverage and other public affairs and local interest programming; the subchannel continues to carry MyNetworkTV programming in prime time.

The News-Press & Gazette Company announced on October 10, 2018, that it was converting KSBB-CD to ATSC 3.0 operations, airing News Now in that format, with its own ATSC 1.0 signal and programming being moved to a subchannel of KEYT-TV.

On January 1, 2021, CBS programming moved from sister station KCOY to KEYT-DT2, moving News Now and MyNetworkTV programming to a new third subchannel.

=== Notable former on-air staff ===
- Christine Craft, anchor/reporter (1970s)
- Giselle Fernández, reporter (circa 1983)
- Michelle Franzen, reporter/fill-in anchor (1993–1994)
- Edie Lambert, anchor/reporter
- Indra Petersons, reporter

== Technical information ==
=== Subchannels ===
The station's digital signal is multiplexed:

Subchannels of KEYT-TV
Subchannel	Res.	Short name	Programming
3.1	720p	KEYT-HD	ABC
3.2	1080i	CBS-HD	CBS
3.3	480i	Now	Independent with MyNetworkTV
3.4	480i	Bounce	Bounce TV
3.5	480i	Telemun	Telemundo (KCOY-TV)
3.6	480i	Nosey	Nosey
3.7	480i	Confess	Confess

Simulcast of subchannels of another station

=== Analog-to-digital conversion ===
KEYT-TV shut down its analog signal, over VHF channel 3, on February 17, 2009, the original target date on which full-power television stations in the United States were to transition from analog to digital broadcasts under federal mandate (which was later pushed back to June 12, 2009). The station's digital signal remained on its pre-transition UHF channel 27, using virtual channel 3.

=== Translators ===
- K26MT-D Paso Robles
- K31KE-D San Luis Obispo, etc.
