= KSMS-TV =

Television station in Monterey, California

- Monterey–Salinas–Santa Cruz, California; United States
- City: Monterey, California
- Channels: Digital: 26 (UHF), shared with KDJT-CD; Virtual: 67
- Branding: Univision 67; Noticias 67 Costa Central (newscasts)

Programming
- Affiliations: 67.1: Univision; 67.3: LATV

Ownership
- Owner: Entravision Communications; (Entravision Holdings, LLC)
- Sister stations: KDJT-CD

History
- First air date: September 1, 1986
- Former channel numbers: Analog: 67 (UHF, 1986–2009); Digital: 31 (UHF, until 2018), 33 (UHF, 2018–2019)
- Former affiliations: SIN (1986–1987)
- Call sign meaning: Salinas, Monterey, Santa Cruz

Technical information
- Licensing authority: FCC
- Facility ID: 35611
- ERP: 15 kW
- HAAT: 707.3 m (2,321 ft)
- Transmitter coordinates: 36°45′22.8″N 121°30′8.7″W

Links
- Public license information: Public file; LMS
- Website: noticiasmonterey.com

KSMS-TV (channel 67) is a television station licensed to Monterey, California, United States, serving the Monterey Bay area as an affiliate of the Spanish-language network Univision. It is owned by Entravision Communications alongside Class A UniMás affiliate KDJT-CD (channel 33, licensed to both Salinas and Monterey). KSMS-TV and KDJT-CD share studios on Garden Court south of Monterey Regional Airport in Monterey; through a channel sharing agreement, the two stations transmit using KDJT-CD's spectrum from an antenna atop Fremont Peak.

== History ==
KSMS-TV was founded by Bill Schuyler on September 1, 1986. In the same year, KCBA, the only television station broadcasting in Spanish in the area, was sold to the Ackerley Group. Ackerley decided to make KCBA an English-language station affiliated with the then-emerging Fox network, which would have left the Salinas–Monterey–Santa Cruz television market without a Spanish-language television station. Knowing that Schuyler had a permit to build a station in the market, a former manager of KCBA encouraged Schuyler to seize the opportunity to create a new station to serve the Hispanic community as an affiliate of the Spanish International Network (the predecessor of Univision).

Schuyler assembled a team of four television professionals and challenge them to develop the new station before KCBA's relaunch. The multiple tasks of creating a new station from the ground up were divided among the four individuals. The group found an old building on Garden Road, which coincidentally had been the first home of KMST-TV (now KION-TV), which Schuyler had started in 1969 and sold a decade later. After negotiating the lease, the remodeling of the old building started immediately. A studio was built in the first floor, along with a small production area, a sound booth and the master control area. After much searching for a suitable transmitter, one was found and installed along with an antenna, atop of Fremont Peak, overlooking the Salinas Valley. Production and broadcasting equipment was purchased and installed, support personnel hired, a small news team was assembled and the station went on the air on time.

== News operation ==
KSMS operates its 6 and 11 p.m. newscasts, each running about 30 minutes each, totaling 10 hours per week. KSMS does not broadcast any local news on weekends. KSMS competed with Telemundo affiliate KMUV-LP, after newscasts were added in September 2009 under the ownership of the Cowles Publishing Company, until the newscasts were axed in September 2025. KSMS also covers national news and news from Latin America. KSMS started its newscasts in November 1987, a few days after Fidel M. Soto joined the station. Soto is currently the longest tenured personality since KSMS's inception.

== Technical information ==
=== Subchannels ===
Subchannels of KDJT-CD and KSMS-TV
License	Channel	Res.	Short name	Programming
KDJT-CD	33.1	1080i	UniMas	UniMas
KSMS-TV	67.1	1080i	Univisn	Univision
KSMS-TV	67.3	480i	LATV	LATV

In June 2010, KSMS began broadcasting in 16:9 HDTV ratio in time for the 2010 FIFA World Cup.

=== Analog-to-digital conversion ===
KSMS-TV shut down its analog signal, over UHF channel 67, on June 12, 2009, the official date on which full-power television stations in the United States transitioned from analog to digital broadcasts under federal mandate. The station's digital signal remained on its pre-transition UHF channel 31, using virtual channel 67.
