= KCBA =

Television station in Salinas, California

- Salinas–Monterey–Santa Cruz, California; United States
- City: Salinas, California
- Channels: Digital: 11 (VHF); Virtual: 35
- Branding: Central Coast CW

Programming
- Affiliations: 35.1: The CW Plus; for others, see § Subchannels

Ownership
- Owner: VistaWest Media; (VistaWest of Monterey, LLC)
- Operator: News-Press & Gazette Company
- Sister stations: KION-TV

History
- First air date: November 1, 1981
- Former channel numbers: Analog: 35 (UHF, 1981–2009); Digital: 13 (VHF, until 2020)
- Former affiliations: SIN/Univision (1981–1986); Independent (1986–1987); Fox (1987–2022)
- Call sign meaning: reverse order of the first three letters of the English alphabet

Technical information
- Licensing authority: FCC
- Facility ID: 14867
- ERP: 19.75 kW
- HAAT: 726 m (2,382 ft)
- Transmitter coordinates: 36°45′22″N 121°30′10″W

Links
- Public license information: Public file; LMS

KCBA (channel 35) is a television station licensed to Salinas, California, United States, serving the Monterey Bay area as an affiliate of The CW Plus. It is owned by VistaWest Media and operated by the News-Press & Gazette Company (NPG) alongside CBS/Fox/Telemundo affiliate KION-TV (channel 46). Programming originates from the KION-TV studio facilities on Moffett Street in Salinas and is broadcast from a transmitter located on Fremont Peak.

Established as a Spanish-language station in 1981, KCBA became an English-language station in 1986 and affiliated with the new Fox network the next year. The station started broadcasting local news in 1990 and acquired most of the operations of KION-TV, then known as KCCN-TV, in 1996. In 2013, Seal Rock changed service providers from KION-TV to Entravision Communications, owner of Univision affiliate KSMS-TV; this deal ended in 2021, and a new agreement was signed with KION. On January 1, 2022, KCBA and KION's second digital subchannel exchanged affiliations.

== History ==
=== Early years ===
On November 12, 1976, the KLOC Broadcasting Corporation filed with the Federal Communications Commission (FCC) to build a new television station on channel 35 in Salinas. The firm proposed to operate the station primarily as a Spanish-language outlet with additional English-language religious programming on weekday mornings. Another group, Leejon Broadcasting, also sought channel 35 for Spanish-language programming, but it opted to withdraw from the contest that June. The construction permit was granted on September 20, 1979, conditional on the sale of one of the two broadcasting properties it owned in Modesto, KLOC radio and KLOC-TV; the radio station was chosen to be sold. The new station launched on November 1, 1981, bringing the Spanish International Network (SIN) to over-the-air viewers on the Central Coast; in 1979, the network's San Francisco station, KDTV, was added to local cable systems.

In March 1986, Sainte reached a deal to sell KCBA to Ackerley Communications of Seattle. The sale created immediate questions about the station's future format, and rumors persisted that Ackerley planned on switching to English-language programming; as a result, the League of United Latin American Citizens objected to the transaction. The FCC approved the sale in May 1986, and in June, Ackerley unveiled its programming plans, which included no Spanish-language output; however, a new station, KSMS-TV (channel 67), would launch with SIN programming using some of KCBA's facilities, and channel 35 would not change formats until that station went into service.

KCBA switched to English-language programming on September 1, 1986, broadcasting a mix of children's programs, sitcoms, movies, and sports events. KCBA joined the Fox network in April 1987 and relocated to quarters on Moffett Avenue in Salinas in 1990, facilities large enough to house a news department.

=== Joint management with KION-TV ===
In April 1996, Ackerley Group entered into an agreement with the Harron Corporation, owner of CBS affiliate KCCN-TV, to take over its operations under a local marketing agreement (LMA). KCCN's newscasts at 5, 6, and 11 p.m. attracted roughly half as many viewers as KCBA's 10 p.m. program. Operations of channel 46 moved from Monterey to Salinas, and local news on the CBS affiliate was suspended for a month before resuming in early June, with many—though not all—KCCN staffers rehired by Ackerley.

Late in 1998, Ackerley bought KION outright from Harron and sold KCBA to Seal Rock Broadcasters, though Ackerley would continue to operate that station on Seal Rock's behalf; the deal closed in 2000. Ackerley merged with Clear Channel Communications in 2002; when Clear Channel spun off its television stations to Newport Television, a broadcasting holding company controlled by the private equity firm Providence Equity Partners, in 2007, the buyers were forced to divest of KION-TV due to overlapping radio interests in San Jose, with the Cowles Publishing Company purchasing that station and assuming the LMA with KCBA.

KCBA's previous logo while under LMA with KION-TV until December 1, 2013

KCBA's first logo as an Entravision station December 1, 2013, to September 10, 2015.

KCBA's final logo as a Fox affiliate, used until 2022.

On June 5, 2013, Entravision Communications—owner of KSMS-TV, UniMás affiliate KDJT-CA, and radio stations KLOK-FM and KSES-FM—announced that it would take over KCBA's operations through a joint sales agreement on or around December 1.

=== Switch to The CW ===
After Entravision opted not to exercise an existing option to purchase KCBA's non-license assets from Seal Rock, the company entered into a new shared services agreement (not including sales) with the News-Press & Gazette Company (NPG) in September 2021 and moved its operations back to Salinas from Entravision's studio center in Monterey. NPG purchased the Fox affiliation and program stream, which moved to KION's 46.2 subchannel on January 1, 2022; simultaneously, the CW affiliation agreement was assigned to Seal Rock for use on KCBA. There was no change for cable or satellite viewers.

On June 21, 2022, Seal Rock Broadcasters filed to sell KCBA for $1 million to VistaWest of Monterey, a company managed by Lyle Leimkuhler, NPG's president and chief executive officer. VistaWest owned KIDK in Idaho Falls, Idaho, and KCOY-TV in Santa Maria, stations that—like KCBA—had shared services agreements with NPG stations in their markets and whose historic network affiliations were transferred to subchannels of those stations. NPG also held an option to acquire KCBA from VistaWest. The sale was completed on June 5, 2023.

== Newscasts ==
In 1990, Ackerley started a local news department for KCBA, becoming the third source of television news on the Central Coast, with 5:30 and 10 p.m. newscasts. The station was able to attract a significant number of employees, including anchor Romney Dunbar, from KMST, which was suffering through a period of ratings and workplace turmoil. In addition to actor Jeremy Slate, who served as the station's entertainment critic, Craig Kilborn served as the weekday sports anchor, a precursor to a career that would include hosting SportsCenter and his own late-night talk show. Alex Witt, who went on to anchor for MSNBC, also was a reporter and anchor for the station in its early years. The station cut back to one hour-long 10 p.m. program in 1991; it reinstated an early evening newscast at 6 p.m. in 1994, using the "family-sensitive newscast" format then being tried at several stations around the country, but dropped the concept after less than a year.

When the original KCBA LMA with KION ended in 2013, the 10 p.m. newscast moved to KION's 46.2 subchannel as of December 1, 2013. KCBA instead began to simulcast the morning and evening newscasts of KTVU in Oakland; that station had long been available on cable systems in Santa Cruz but was dropped at that time. By late 2021, KCBA was simulcasting 42 hours a week of KTVU's news output.

As of 2025, KCBA aired a 10 p.m. local newscast. By 2026, it was airing the first 30 minutes of KTVU's 10 p.m. news.

== Technical information ==
=== Subchannels ===
KCBA is broadcast from a transmitter located on Fremont Peak. The station's signal is multiplexed:

Subchannels of KCBA
| Subchannel | Res. | Short name | Programming |
|---|---|---|---|
| 35.1 | 1080i | KCBA-HD | The CW Plus |
| 35.2 | 480i | CourtTV | Court TV |
| 35.3 | 480i | IONPlus | Ion Plus |
| 35.6 | 480i | Confess | Confess by Nosey |
| 23.1 | 1080i | KMUV-DT | Telemundo (KMUV-LD) |

Simulcast of subchannels of another station

=== Analog-to-digital conversion ===
KCBA shut down its analog signal, over UHF channel 35, on February 17, 2009, the original target date on which full-power television stations in the United States were to transition from analog to digital broadcasts under federal mandate (which was later pushed back to June 12, 2009). The station's digital signal remained on its pre-transition VHF channel 13, using virtual channel 35.
