= KSUR (disambiguation) =

KSUR (630 AM) is a defunct radio station formerly licensed to serve Monterey, California, United States

KSUR may also refer to:

- KKAR, a radio station (1260 AM) licensed to Beverly Hills, California from 2017 to 2020
- KWAA, a radio station (88.9 FM) licensed to Mart, Texas, United States, known as KSUR from 2005 to 2016
- KAZZ (AM), a radio station (1400 AM) licensed to Parowan, Utah, United States, known as KSUR from 2001 to 2002
- KMBX, a radio station (700 AM) licensed to Soledad, California, known as KSUR from 1994 to 1995
- KLOK-FM, a radio station (99.5 FM) licensed to Greenfield, California, known as KSUR and KSUR-FM from 1989 to 1994 and 1994 to 1995
