= Fox 35 =

FOX 35 may refer to one of the following television stations in the United States affiliated with the Fox Broadcasting Company:

== Current ==
- KION-DT2, a digital channel of KION-TV in Monterey, California (branded as Fox 35)
- WOFL in Orlando, Florida (O&O)
- WRLH-TV in Richmond, Virginia

== Former ==
- KCBA in Salinas, California (1986–2022)
- KRRT (now KMYS) in San Antonio, Texas (1986–1995)
- KKVI/KXTF in Twin Falls, Idaho (1996–2012)
- WUFX (now WLOO) in Jackson, Mississippi (2003–2006)
