= Rancho Cienega del Gabilán =

Mexican land grant in California

Coordinates: 36.750°N 121.470°W

Rancho Cienega del Gabilán was a 48,781-acre (197.41 km^{2}) Mexican land grant in present-day Monterey County and San Benito County, California.

It was granted in 1843 by Governor Manuel Micheltorena to Antonio Chaves (Chávez). The name means "spring of the hawk ranch". The grant was located in the Gabilan Range east of present-day Salinas.

== History ==
José Antonio Chávez came to California in 1833 with Governor José Figueroa. He was a tax collector at Monterey in 1843, and one of the prime movers in the movement against Manuel Micheltorena 1844. Chávez was the grantee of the eleven square league Rancho Cienega del Gabilán 1843 and the three square league Rancho Pleyto in 1845. He took part as Lieutenant in various military operations in the Mexican–American War of 1846. He was sent by José Castro to John C. Frémont's camp at Gavilan Peak. Later he kidnapped Thomas O. Larkin and was second in command at the Battle of Natividad, where he was wounded. He returned to Mexico in 1848.

With the cession of California to the United States following the Mexican-American War, the 1848 Treaty of Guadalupe Hidalgo provided that the land grants would be honored. As required by the Land Act of 1851, a claim for Rancho Cienega del Gabilán was filed by José Yves Limantour with the Public Land Commission in 1853. José Yves Limantour, who became notorious for his fraudulent claims, maintained that he had bought the grant from Chaves. The land commission rejected his claim.

Thomas O. Larkin (1802 - 1858) claimed he bought Rancho Cienega del Gabilan from Chaves and received confirmation of it just after he died in 1858. Larkin had also bought Rancho Pleyto from Chaves.

Jesse D. Carr bought the rancho from the Larkin heirs, and the grant was patented to Jesse D. Carr in 1867.

Jesse Carr sold the ranch in portions. The western portion was acquired by the James Bardin family (owners of part of neighboring Rancho El Alisal), who continue to own parts of the ranch. Some of the land was acquired from Bardin heirs by the Silacci family in 1939. The Silacci family continues to ranch on the land; the California Rangeland Trust has acquired a conservation easement on their land.

The central portion of the Gabilan ranch was later owned by Egbert Judson of Giant Powder Company. Salinas doctor Rollin Reeves acquired the ranch in 1929. Reeves donated some of his land to the State of California for Fremont Peak State Park. His descendants continue to own the ranch and have expanded it by purchasing neighboring parcels. The Nature Conservancy purchased a conservation easement on the property in 2006.

== See also ==
- List of Ranchos of California
- Ranchos of Monterey County, California
- Ranchos of San Benito County, California
