= Pedram Javaheri =

Persian-American meteorologist

- Born: 24 May 1983 (age 42); Tehran, Iran
- Occupation: Meteorologist
- Years active: 2002 to present
- Employer: CNN
- Agent(s): Al Corral, Napoli Management Group

Pedram "P.J." Javaheri (born May 24, 1983) is an Iranian-American meteorologist for CNN International formerly based at CNN World Headquarters in Atlanta, Georgia. He can be seen regularly on editions of CNN Newsroom and World Business Today. He also fills in on HLN's Morning Express with Robin Meade and appears on CNN U.S. during breaking news and severe weather coverage.

== Background ==
Javaheri was born in Tehran, Iran to Iranian parents. In October 1993, his family emigrated from Tehran to Redmond, Washington, where he attended elementary school and high school.

He moved on to college at Mesa Community College and Arizona State University. He also attended Mississippi State University, where he obtained degrees in broadcast journalism and meteorology.

Javaheri is fluent in Persian, Turkish, and English.

== Broadcasting career ==
Javaheri began as a weather anchor at Arizona State University in 2002. While there, he led and developed the school’s first weather department at NewsWatch TV, an in-school news program broadcast throughout the State of Arizona. One week prior to his graduation, he accepted a position as a meteorologist in Utah at KCSG. He was later promoted to chief meteorologist and oversaw all weather operations.

In 2008, a duopoly station in California's Central Coast hired him to serve as the environmental reporter and present the weather as a meteorologist for KCOY, KKFX, KION, and KCBA. He had an audience of over 500,000 television households. While in California, he covered numerous notable events. In 2008, he was on the scene of the Basin Complex Fire in Big Sur, the second costliest wildfire in U.S. history. In June 2009, he became the only reporter in the market to cover the Michael Jackson memorial service at the Staples Center after having won a lottery to attend it.

He joined CNN in June 2010 and now resides in Atlanta.

== Awards and recognition ==
During his time in California, Javaheri received an Emmy nomination for outstanding achievement in weather from the San Francisco / Northern California Emmy Awards. In August 2010, Iranian.com honored him as its Iranian of the Day. He was part of the CNN weather team that won the prestigious Peabody Award for its coverage of the 2010 Deepwater Horizon oil spill in the Gulf of Mexico.

On March 11, 2011, in the aftermath of the devastating Japanese earthquake, he and CNN U.S. meteorologist Chad Myers became the first duo in CNN’s history to simultaneously forecast and cover the resulting tsunami and its impact to a global audience.
