= Fremont Peak Observatory =

Astronomical observatory located in California opened in 1986

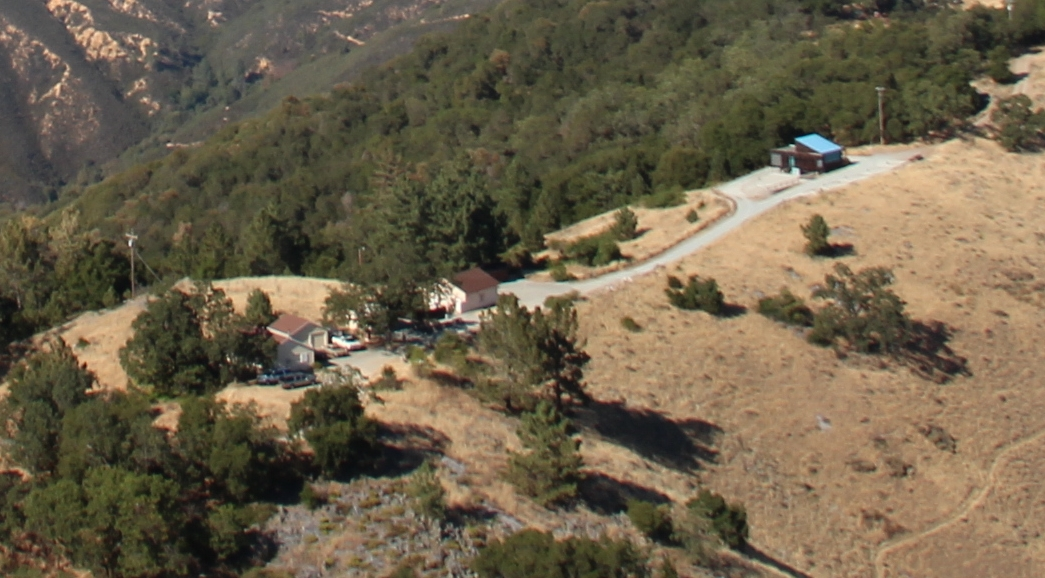
- Fremont Peak Observatory viewed from Fremont Peak
- Organization: Fremont Peak Observatory Association
- Location: Fremont Peak State Park
- Coordinates: 36°45′36.8″N 121°29′55.4″W
- Altitude: 838 m (2,749 ft)
- Established: 1986
- Website: fpoa.net

Telescopes
- Challenger Telescope: 30" f4.8 reflector

Fremont Peak Observatory (FPOA) is an astronomical observatory operated by Fremont Peak Observatory Association (FPOA) under contract to the State of California. Built in 1986, it is located in Fremont Peak State Park, near San Juan Bautista, California. Fremont Peak Observatory houses the Challenger telescope.

== History ==
The observatory is named after the mountain it resides on, Fremont Peak which was itself named for American explorer and U.S. Army Captain John C. Frémont. Previously the peak had been named for the Spanish word for hawk, Gabilan Peak. The California state park service "acquired the peak in 1936".

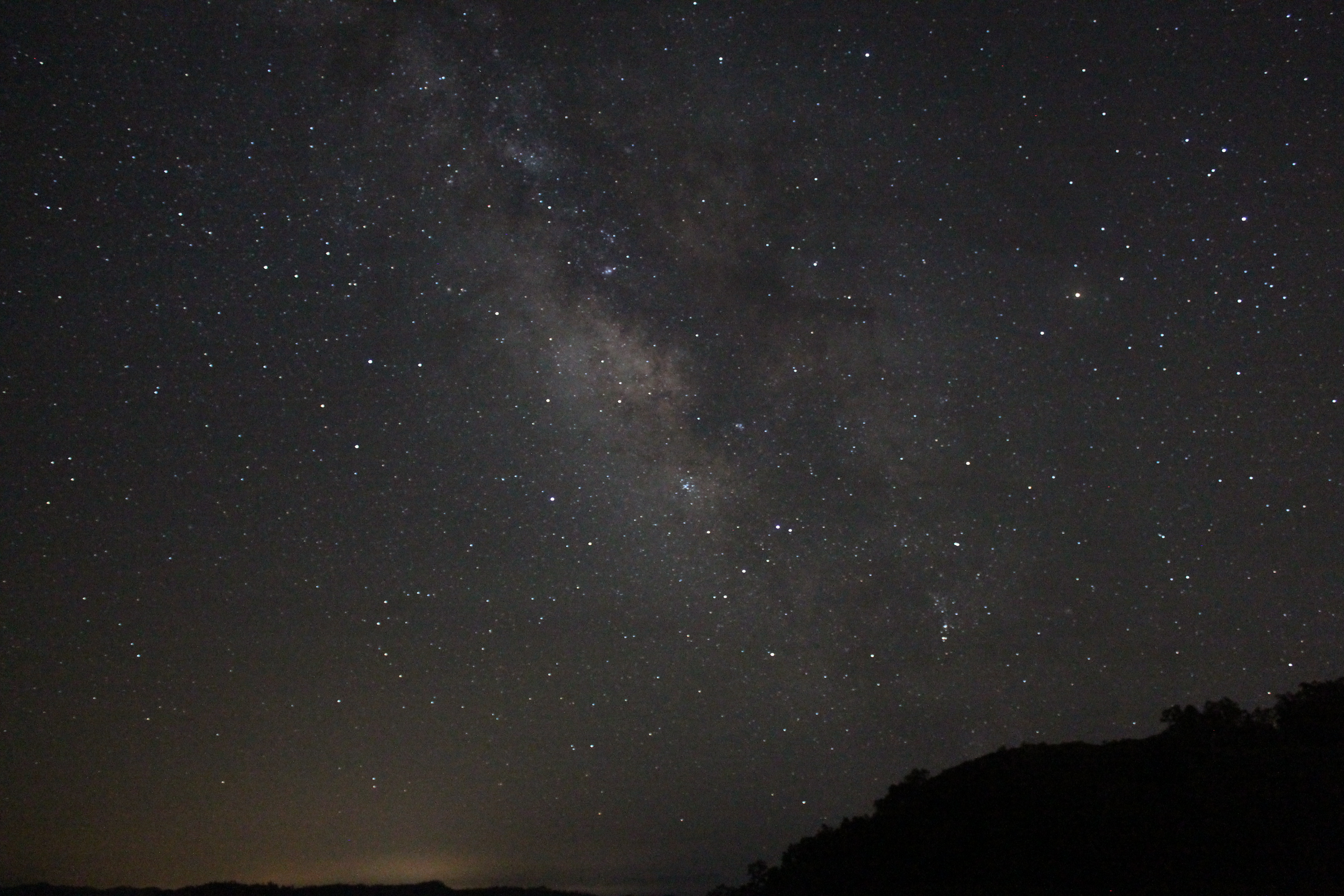
The clear skies of Fremont Peak make naked eye observations, such as this one of the Milky Way, possible. July 12, 2013

The first group to use the peak as an observatory was the San Mateo Astronomical Society in the late 1960s. The location, which allowed amateur astronomers to see above the fog line and block out much of the lights from Monterey County infrastructure, made the area popular for groups from the North Bay area. Volunteers raised $25,000 from equipment donated by telescope manufacturer Celestron. With donated time, labor and equipment formed the Fremont Peak Observatory Association which became a 510(c)(3) non-profit. The observatory opened on May 30, 1987, with the free program "The Realm of the Galaxies".

In 2003 the State Park Department made "significant improvements" to the observatory grounds which included the removal of four large trees which had been obscuring the southern sky in the observing area. New roads, observing pads with power outlets, walkways and "low-intensity safety lighting" were added. A large multi-use area was added on the west side of the observatory.

Fremont Peak Observatory was under threat of closure due to the 2009 California budget crisis. In a statement on the FPOA website, FPOA President Doug Brown references a request by the California Department of Parks and Recreation to FPOA to donate $100,000 to the State of California or face the closure of the park. Budget considerations resulted in a curtailing of park hours.

'We teach people about astronomy, and what is out in the universe and where are we in it, as well some of the history and dynamics of what's going on out there.' – president Doug Brown

== Challenger telescope ==
The facility uses a telescope called Challenger named after the Space Shuttle Challenger. This is a 30-inch diameter primary mirror, "one of the largest telescopes available for public use" on an "English cross-axis equatorial mount" with a f/4.8 Newtonian lens (3.7m focal length). The telescope was made by Kevin and Denni Medlock from the Eastbay Astronomical Society "in the early 1980s. First light was 1986." They "ground the mirror and built the scope in their garage". The scope weighs one ton and sits in a room the size of a classroom, according to intern, Edwin Levin, the "'mirror itself weighs 250 pounds. It's bolted into solid concrete, straight through the mountain, down to bedrock. A little motor, which matches the speed of the earth's rotation, keeps the telescope centered on the object we’re looking at." The telescope at the opening of the observatory in 1987, was valued at $50,000.

After a program in the observatory's meeting room, the roof rolls back, the telescope is pointed at the sky, and you are transported from Earth to outer space as planets, nebulae, star clusters, double stars, and other deep sky objects appear. – Doris Sloan

== Cameras for Allsky Meteor Surveillance (CAMS) ==
NASA astronomer Peter Jenniskens announced that the FPOA will be taking part in the Cameras for Allsky Meteor Surveillance (CAMS) project which aims to map meteor showers.

== 2009 Lunar impact ==
The FPOA held an "impact party" October 2009 which over fifty people attended to view the 4:30am event. NASA crashed a rocket into the moon in a test to measure for water. They claimed that the impact would cause a plume of dust that would be visible to astronomers with mid-sized telescopes. NASA stated that the experiment was a success, but observers were not able to see the impact. While disappointed, Fremont Peak party attendees "were good sports" according to vice-president of FPOA Dave Samuels, "they all learned something". Samuels stated, "it was worth coming and being a part of something that was going on".

== Operation ==
Fremont Peak Observatory operates by trained volunteers. An intern program has been underway for several years, using science students from nearby Hartnell College. The astronomical program dates operate April through October on non-full Moon Saturday nights.

In 2009 the association has 150 volunteers and operates on a budget of $3000. Thirty events attracting a total of 2,000 visitors were reported in 2008.

== Educator of the Year award ==
- 2008 Andy Newton – Hartnell Planetarium Director – for "establishing and implementing the Hartnell College student internship program"

== See also ==
- Fremont Peak (California)
- Gabilan Range
- List of astronomical observatories
