= KKEY-LD =

Television station in Bakersfield, California

- Bakersfield, California; United States
- Channels: Digital: 13 (VHF); Virtual: 13
- Branding: Telemundo Valle Central

Programming
- Affiliations: 13.1: Telemundo

Ownership
- Owner: Nexstar Media Group; (Nexstar Media Inc.)
- Sister stations: KGET-TV

History
- Founded: October 24, 1991
- First air date: May 22, 1997
- Former call signs: K14IK (1991–February 19, 1997, May 22, 1997–2003); DK14IK (February 20–May 21, 1997); KKEY-LP (2003–2014)
- Former channel number: Analog: 14 (UHF, 1997–2003), 11 (VHF, 2003–2009 and 2010–2014)
- Call sign meaning: Kern County

Technical information
- Licensing authority: FCC
- Facility ID: 18750
- Class: LD
- ERP: 3 kW
- HAAT: 376.5 m (1,235 ft)
- Transmitter coordinates: 35°26′17.1″N 118°44′26.3″W
- Translator(s): KGET-TV 17.3 Bakersfield

Links
- Public license information: LMS
- Website: www.kget.com/telemundo/

KKEY-LD (channel 13) is a low-power television station in Bakersfield, California, United States, affiliated with the Spanish-language network Telemundo. It is owned by Nexstar Media Group alongside NBC/CW+ affiliate KGET-TV (channel 17). The two stations share studios on L Street in downtown Bakersfield; KKEY-LD's transmitter is located atop Mount Adelaide.

In addition to its own digital signal, KKEY-LD is simulcast in standard definition on KGET-TV's third digital subchannel (17.3) from the same transmitter site.

== History ==
The station was formerly known as K14IK and carried a low-power signal on UHF channel 14. In 2003, it moved to VHF channel 11 and was renamed KKEY-LP and became a Telemundo affiliate that same year. Previously, Telemundo programming was piped through Los Angeles' KVEA on cable providers. On April 20, 2007, Clear Channel Communications (now iHeartMedia) entered into an agreement to sell its entire television stations group to Newport Television, a broadcasting holding company established by the private equity firm Providence Equity Partners. This deal closed on March 14, 2008. However, due to Providence Equity Partners' partial ownership stake in rival Spanish-language network Univision, the owner of MyNetworkTV affiliate KUVI-TV (channel 45), KKEY-LP was sold along with KGET-TV and five other stations (CBS affiliate KGPE in Fresno, KTVX and KUCW in Salt Lake City, WOAI-TV in San Antonio, and WTEV-TV in Jacksonville) to High Plains Broadcasting. However, due to KKEY-LP's low-power status, it was excluded along with KTVX from the deal, which was finalized on September 15, 2008. Newport Television continued to operate KGET through a shared services agreement.

Newport agreed to sell KKEY-LP and KGET-TV, as well as KGPE in Fresno, to Nexstar Broadcasting Group on November 5, 2012. The sale was completed on February 19, 2013.

== Technical information ==
=== Subchannel ===
Subchannel of KKEY-LD
Channel	Res.	Short name	Programming
13.1	1080i	KKEY-TV	Telemundo

=== Analog-to-digital conversion ===
The analog signal went off the air on July 31, 2009, and for a year KKEY only existed as a subchannel of KGET and was even rebranded "Telemundo 17.3". On July 23, 2010, the analog signal on channel 11 came back on the air—just nine days before the station's analog license was to be canceled by the Federal Communications Commission (FCC). In April 2014, the analog signal on channel 11 went off the air and a high-definition digital signal went on the air on channel 13.
