= CBS 46 =

CBS 46 may refer to:

- KION-TV in Monterey, California
- WANF in Atlanta, Georgia, which was affiliated with CBS from 1994 to 2025
