= Fremont Peak State Park =

State park in California, United States

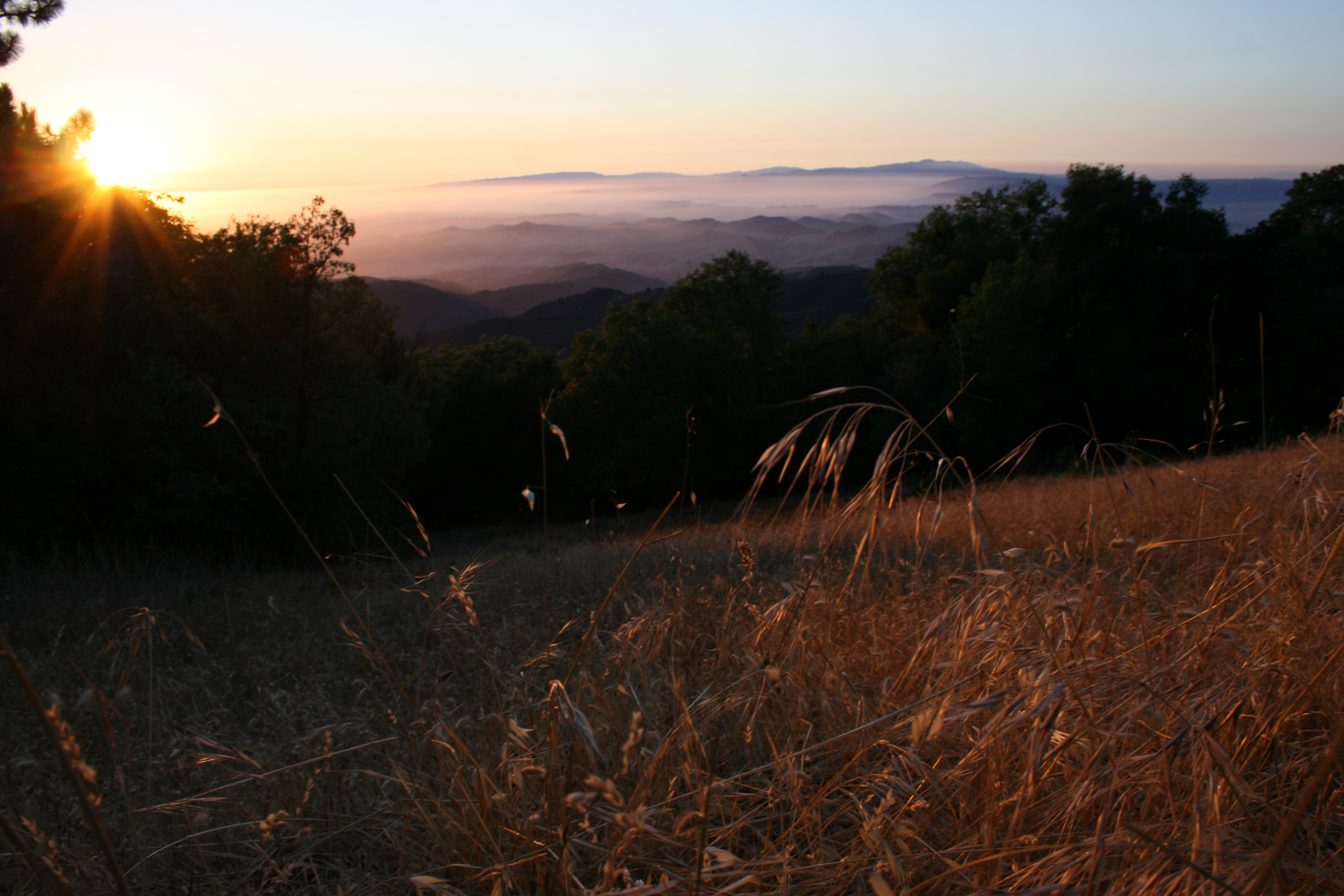
- Sunset view from Fremont Peak State Park

- Location within California Location within the United States
- Location: Gabilan Range, Monterey County, San Benito County; California
- Nearest city: San Juan Bautista, California
- Coordinates: 36°45′36″N 121°30′6″W
- Area: 162 acres (66 ha)
- Established: 1934
- Governing body: California Department of Parks and Recreation

Fremont Peak State Park is a California State Park located in Monterey County and San Benito County, California. The park encompasses the summit of 3,173-foot (967 m) Fremont Peak in the Gabilan Range.

The park features expansive views of Monterey Bay and Pacific Ocean from its hiking trails. Other vistas include the San Benito Valley, Salinas Valley, and the Santa Lucia Mountains east of Big Sur. The 162-acre (66 ha) park was established in 1934. The land was donated by Rollin Reeves, owner of Rancho Cienega del Gabilán.

== Natural history ==
Pine and California oak woodlands, of the California chaparral and woodlands ecoregion, cover much of the park and are home to many birds and mammals.

== Recreation ==
The park has hiking trails, picnic facilities and 22 campsites (both tent and RV).

The Fremont Peak Observatory opened in 1986, and has operated every summer since, despite having battled the frequently brutal mountaintop weather. The astronomical observatory has a 30-inch (760 mm) telescope. Fremont Peak Day is held every April, and features a picnic and other activities.

== Proposed for closure ==
The park was one of the 48 California state parks proposed for closure in January 2008 by Governor Arnold Schwarzenegger as part of a deficit reduction program. The closures were ultimately avoided by cutting hours and maintenance system-wide.

== See also ==
- List of California state parks
- George H. Moore, Los Angeles City Council member 1943–51, chairman of a group that established the park
