= Rancho Pleyto =

Mexican land grant in California

Coordinates: 35.850°N 121.000°W

Rancho Pleyto (also called Pleito) was a 13,299-acre (53.82 km^{2}) Mexican land grant in the Santa Lucia Range, in present-day southern Monterey County, California.

It was granted in 1845 by Governor Pío Pico to Antonio Chaves (Chávez). The grant extended along the San Antonio River southeast of present-day Jolon. Much of the grant is under water, inundated by the creation of the San Antonio Reservoir.

== History ==
José Antonio Chávez, came to California in 1833 with Governor José Figueroa. He was tax collector at Monterey in 1843, and one of the prime movers in the movement against Manuel Micheltorena 1844. Chaves was the grantee of the eleven square league Rancho Cienega del Gabilan in 1843, and the three square league Rancho Pleyto in 1845. He took part as Lieutenant in various military operations in the Mexican–American War of 1846. He was sent by José Castro to John C. Frémont's camp at Gavilan Peak. Later he kidnapped Thomas O. Larkin and was second in command at the Battle of Natividad, where he was wounded. He returned to Mexico in 1848.

Thomas O. Larkin (1802–1858) bought Rancho Pleyto from Chaves. Larkin also bought Rancho Cienega del Gabilan from Chaves.

William S. Johnson and Preston K. Woodside came to California with Jonathan D. Stevenson's 1st Regiment of New York Volunteers, part of the American occupation army force that landed in California in 1847.

With the cession of California to the United States following the Mexican-American War, the 1848 Treaty of Guadalupe Hidalgo provided that the land grants would be honored. As required by the Land Act of 1851, a claim for Rancho Pleyto was filed with the Public Land Commission in 1852, and the grant was patented to William S. Johnson and Preston K. Woodside in 1872.

William Pinkerton (1843–1918) bought a large portion of Rancho Pleyto in 1868, and founded the town of Pleyto, which is now completely under water, inundated by the creation of Lake San Antonio.

== See also ==
- Ranchos of Monterey County, California
- List of California Ranchos
