= KION-TV =

Television station in Monterey, California

- Monterey–Salinas–Santa Cruz, California; United States
- City: Monterey, California
- Channels: Digital: 32 (UHF); Virtual: 46
- Branding: KION Central Coast; Fox 35 (46.2)

Programming
- Affiliations: 46.1: CBS; 46.2: Fox; 46.3: Ion Television; 23.1: Telemundo

Ownership
- Owner: News-Press & Gazette Company; (NPG of Monterey-Salinas CA, LLC)
- Sister stations: KCBA

History
- First air date: February 1, 1969
- Former call signs: KMST (1969–1993); KCCN-TV (1993–1997); KION (1997–2002)
- Former channel numbers: Analog: 46 (UHF, 1969–2009)
- Call sign meaning: "Eye On" phonetically (reference to the CBS Eyemark)

Technical information
- Licensing authority: FCC
- Facility ID: 26249
- ERP: 46 kW; 105 kW (CP)
- HAAT: 758 m (2,487 ft); 780 m (2,559 ft) (CP)
- Transmitter coordinates: 36°32′5″N 121°37′18″W
- Translator(s): KMUV-LD 23 Monterey

Links
- Public license information: Public file; LMS
- Website: kioncentralcoast.com

KION-TV (channel 46) is a television station licensed to Monterey, California, United States, affiliated with CBS and Fox. Owned by the News-Press & Gazette Company, it serves the Monterey Bay area from studios located on Moffett Street in Salinas, immediately south of Salinas Municipal Airport, and a transmitter on Mount Toro, about 10 miles (16 km) south of Salinas. The station is rebroadcast on subchannels of KMUV-LD (channel 23), the local Telemundo affiliate, with transmitter on Fremont Peak.

This station was the second established in the Salinas–Monterey area proper, beginning broadcasts in 1969; it has been affiliated with CBS since it signed on. Traditionally a second- or even third-place operation in the market, its operations were merged with KCBA (channel 35), then the region's Fox affiliate, between 1996 and 2013. The Fox subchannel on KION-TV, "Fox 35", represents the continuation of what was KCBA's programming after this station reacquired the Fox affiliation in 2021. KION produced English- and Spanish-language local newscasts covering the northern Central Coast until the news department was shuttered in September 2025.

== History ==
=== Early years ===
On November 4, 1966, the Federal Communications Commission (FCC) granted a construction permit to Monterey–Salinas Television, Inc., to build a new commercial television station on channel 46 in Monterey. The company was led by Stoddard P. Johnston, owner of radio stations KMBY and KMBY-FM in Monterey, and also featured William H. Schuyler. Schuyler had been the president of KTVU in Oakland, California, and Johnston chaired its board of directors before it was sold to Cox Broadcasting. In 1968, a planned start date of September 1 was announced for the new KMBY-TV, which Johnston said would benefit from the recent addition of UHF tuning to all new televisions and from the widespread use of cable TV systems in Salinas, Monterey, and Santa Cruz. On June 1, 1968, the unbuilt station changed its call sign to KMST, and though the September start was missed, construction moved along and the station picked up the CBS affiliation; at the time, KSBW (channel 8) in Salinas, a primary NBC affiliate, aired some CBS programs. Schuyler would later note that one of the reasons the Central Coast was picked was because CBS had an interest in adding an affiliate in the area, with NBC already spoken for and KNTV in San Jose then serving the Salinas and Monterey area with ABC programming but no CBS outlet between KPIX-TV in San Francisco and KCOY-TV in Santa Maria. KMST would remain on cable in San Jose until 1993, when the TCI system there demoted it and then dropped it altogether.

KMST intended to begin broadcasting on January 25, 1969, but bad weather kept the station off the air; the microwave link to receive KPIX-TV and CBS programming had not yet been installed. KMST made its debut on February 1, a week later than planned. Leased quarters off the Monterey–Salinas highway were used as an interim studio site, but the acoustics were poor; eventually, the station relocated to a purpose-built site near the Monterey Peninsular Airport. In December 1973, the Johnston-led group filed to sell KMST to a new company, also named Monterey–Salinas Television, which featured Johnston and other new owners. The new owners were brought in to provide additional needed capital for equipment improvements.

Retlaw Enterprises, a company owned by relatives of Walt Disney, purchased KMST for $8.25 million in 1979. The sale offer was chosen because it was all-cash; five different groups had sought to purchase the station. KMST was traditionally a training ground for broadcasters; one former reporter, Kathryn Pratt, noted that many staffers called it the "KMST School of Broadcasting".

The late 1980s and early 1990s would prove to be turbulent times for the station. Citing poor working conditions, KMST employees voted 43–2 to unionize with the American Federation of Television and Radio Artists in 1989. Retlaw constantly fought the unionization effort; when it fired a production director who had been active in the organizing effort, the National Labor Relations Board filed a complaint against ownership. The news department struggled; newscasts were cut, and six staffers defected to KCBA (channel 35), which started a news department in 1990. Union negotiations remained incomplete in 1991, with AFTRA blaming station management for stalling and stating that the two-year turnover rate at KMST had reached 80 percent. Meanwhile, the station experimented with an early prime time schedule, airing prime time from 7 to 10 p.m. instead of from 8 to 11, for a year in 1992; other Northern California stations also tried out the time change.

=== Harron, Ackerley, and Clear Channel ownership ===
In 1993, Retlaw sold KMST for $8.2 million to Harron-Smith Television Partnership, a joint venture of Harron Communications and Smith Broadcasting. Amid a major retooling of the station, the call letters were changed in October to KCCN-TV, representing the new title of its newscasts, "Central Coast News". The call letters were shared with two stations in Honolulu, Hawaii, KCCN AM and KCCN-FM.

A year into the partnership, Smith sold its half back to Harron; the next year, it bought KSBW-TV, channel 46's longtime competitor. Meanwhile, Harron began to realize it was in over its head with the task it confronted at KCCN-TV, having underestimated the dimensions of the challenge posed by turning it around. In late 1995, Harron began to shop KCCN-TV—or its assets—for sale. Smith then looked at buying back KCCN-TV's assets and programming the station under a local marketing agreement (LMA). A deal with Smith was far along enough that it was reported as confirmed by the Santa Cruz Sentinel newspaper. However, negotiations then stalled, and Harron sought another buyer.

At 3 p.m. on April 24, 1996, KCBA owner Ackerley Communications took over the operations of KCCN-TV. Harron immediately laid off 70 employees and shut the channel 46 newsroom down, though 25 employees would then be hired back by KCBA. News director Adrienne Laurent popped up three hours later as a fill-in anchor on KSBW's 6 p.m. newscast. KCBA promised to restore news to KCCN-TV on June 3 in what was just the second LMA of its type involving two news-producing stations. With the agreement, KCCN-TV operations moved from Monterey to Salinas. The move drew fire from the city councils of Salinas and Monterey and the Monterey County Board of Supervisors, as well as several private petitions to the FCC. The first KCCN-TV local newscasts from KCBA in Salinas were picketed by some of the employees that were not rehired. On February 23, 1997, KCCN changed its call letters again, this time to KION, after the rise of the World Wide Web brought new complaints from the Honolulu radio stations, who wanted to restrict channel 46 from using their call sign on their website.

Late in 1998, Ackerley bought KION outright from Harron and sold KCBA to Seal Rock Broadcasters, though Ackerley would continue to operate that station on Seal Rock's behalf. It took more than a year for this transaction to receive FCC approval, due to the then-pending license renewals for both stations; the deal was completed on January 12, 2000. Ackerley instituted three master control hubs in its group in 2000, one of them in Salinas and the others at KGET-TV in Bakersfield and WIXT in Syracuse, New York. The Salinas hub served KION and KCBA as well as KFTY in Santa Rosa, KVIQ-TV in Eureka, and KMTR in Eugene, Oregon.

Two years later, Ackerley merged with Clear Channel Communications. Clear Channel already owned radio stations on the Central Coast, and one of them began to share KION's call sign: news/talk-formatted KTXX (1460 AM) became KION as part of a partnership that saw collaboration between the radio station and the TV newsroom.

=== Cowles and NPG ownership ===
On April 20, 2007, Clear Channel entered into an agreement to spin off its entire television stations group to Newport Television, a broadcasting holding company established by the private equity firm Providence Equity Partners. (Clear Channel retained KION radio.) However, Newport Television could not keep KION or Telemundo affiliate KMUV-LP; Providence Equity Partners owned a stake in Univision, whose radio division owned several overlapping radio stations in the San Jose area. Instead, KION and KMUV-LP, along with KCOY-TV and KKFX-CA, the Clear Channel TV stations on the southern Central Coast, were sold to the Cowles Publishing Company of Spokane, Washington, for $41 million.

KION's logo from June 2014 to August 2016

On September 20, 2013, News-Press & Gazette Company (NPG) announced that it would purchase KION-TV and KMUV-LP, as well as KKFX-CA; NPG would also take over some of the operations of KCOY-TV, which it could not own directly as NPG's holdings in that area already included KEYT-TV in Santa Barbara. The sale was completed on December 13.

The existing LMA for KCBA was terminated on December 1, 2013, as Seal Rock entered into a new joint sales agreement with Entravision Communications; as a consequence, KION's 10 p.m. newscast moved from KCBA to its second subchannel, which was affiliated with The CW Plus. After Entravision opted not to exercise an existing option to purchase KCBA's non-license assets from Seal Rock, that company entered into a new shared services agreement with NPG in September 2021. NPG purchased the Fox affiliation and program stream, which moved to KION's 46.2 subchannel on January 1, 2022; simultaneously, the CW affiliation agreement was assigned to Seal Rock for use on KCBA. There was no change for cable or satellite viewers.

== News operation ==
The first local newscasts on channel 46 launched with the station; for the first several years, KMST had no color cameras, so the programs aired in black and white. Channel 46's local news consistently was a distant second to KSBW-TV's offerings. The later Retlaw years were marked by major changes in staffing and news offerings. After noon and 5 p.m. newscasts were axed in 1989 and 1990, the station was down to producing one hour of news a day; further, it lost six staffers to the upstart KCBA. The 11 p.m. newscast was dropped in 1991 in favor of reviving the earlier newscasts. As part of the KCCN-TV relaunch in 1993, the station returned to producing three daily newscasts. Ratings were very low; 3,000 to 4,000 households nightly watched its local newscast, a far cry from the 23,000 to 36,000 households watching KSBW, the 7,000 viewers KCBA accrued at 10 p.m., or even the Spanish-language newscast on KSMS-TV, with 11,000 viewers at 6 p.m.

After taking over in 1996, Ackerley rehired the main presenters of KCCN-TV's news—Ed Bradford, Karina Rusk, and Hunter Finnell—for its retooled newscast, investing in a new news set. It then proceeded to add a morning newscast, originally titled Eye on This Morning, in early 1997 when the call letters changed to KION-TV. The morning show ceased production in 2001 due to a soft economy. KION aired a two-hour weekday morning newscast as well as half-hour programs at 5, 6, and 11 p.m. and a 10 p.m. newscast for the CW subchannel (now KCBA 35.1). The Fox subchannel, in lieu of airing local news from the Monterey–Salinas area, aired 42 hours a week of news simulcasts from KTVU in the Bay Area as of 2021.

On January 6, 2012, sister stations KCOY and KKFX announced a round of layoffs in an effort to cut costs, including eliminating the sports department, cutting the morning show produced at the Santa Maria studios to only one hour on weekdays, and having the evening newscasts based at the KION/KCBA studios. News production for those stations moved to Santa Barbara upon the NPG purchase.

On September 23, 2025, KSBW reported that KION would immediately shut down its local news operations, with select newscasts simulcast from KPIX-TV, the CBS owned-and-operated station for the Bay Area, beginning that evening. The newscast produced for Telemundo was also canceled with no replacement. Employees were expected to be laid off; some told KSBW that they found out of the change through news reporting. A KION reporter told KSBW that NPG corporate personnel she had never met told her in the meeting, "We're never doing live news again." The assistant news director, who learned of the news in a phone call from his boss, estimated in an interview with Lookout Santa Cruz that 16 employees lost their jobs.

=== Notable former on-air staff ===
- Lois Hart
- Kimberly Hunt – reporter (1984–1987)
- Pedram Javaheri, also known as P. J. Javaheri – meteorologist
- Sharon Tay – reporter, 1990–1992

== Technical information ==
=== Subchannels ===
KION-TV's transmitter is located on Mount Toro, about 10 miles (16 km) south of Salinas. The station's signal is multiplexed:

Subchannels of KION-TV
Subchannel	Res.	Short name	Programming
46.1	1080i	KION-DT	CBS
46.2	720p	FOX35	Fox
46.3	480i	ION	Ion
23.1	480i	KMUV-HD	Telemundo (KMUV-LD)

Simulcast of subchannels of another station

=== Analog-to-digital conversion ===
KION-TV shut down its analog signal, over UHF channel 46, on February 17, 2009, the original target date for the digital television transition. The station's digital signal remained on its pre-transition UHF channel 32.

== See also ==
- Channel 5 branded TV stations in the United States
- Channel 32 digital TV stations in the United States
- Channel 46 virtual TV stations in the United States
