= KMUV-LD =

Television station in Monterey, California

Translator of KION-TV, Monterey, California
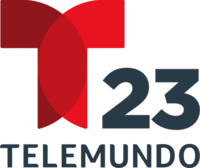
- Monterey, California; United States
- Channels: Digital: 23 (UHF); Virtual: 23
- Branding: Telemundo 23

Programming
- Affiliations: 23.1: Telemundo; 46.1: CBS; 46.2: Fox

Ownership
- Owner: News-Press & Gazette Company; (NPG of Monterey-Salinas CA, LLC)

History
- Founded: May 31, 1989
- Former call signs: K67EU (1989–1998); K23EW (1998–2002); KMUV-LP (2002–2019)
- Former channel numbers: Analog: 23 (UHF, 2001–2019); Digital: 21 (UHF, 2019–2021)
- Former affiliations: Univision (1989–2005)
- Call sign meaning: Monterey Univision (former affiliation)

Technical information
- Licensing authority: FCC
- Facility ID: 59362
- Class: LD
- ERP: 15 kW
- HAAT: 688.3 m (2,258 ft)
- Transmitter coordinates: 36°45′22.8″N 121°30′8.7″W

Links
- Public license information: LMS

KMUV-LD (channel 23) is a low-power television station licensed to Monterey, California, United States. It is a translator of CBS/Fox/Telemundo affiliate KION-TV (channel 46, also licensed to Monterey) which is owned by the News-Press & Gazette Company. KMUV-LD's transmitter is located on Fremont Peak; its parent station maintains studios on Moffett Street in Salinas immediately south of Salinas Municipal Airport.

== History ==
As KMUV-LP, the station was previously a Univision affiliate; it switched to Telemundo by 2005, when Clear Channel Communications acquired the station. The KMUV call sign had previously been assigned to channel 31 in Sacramento from 1974 until 1981; that station is now KMAX-TV.

=== Sale to Cowles Publishing Company ===
On April 20, 2007, Clear Channel Communications (now iHeartMedia) entered into an agreement to spin off its entire television stations group to Newport Television, a broadcasting holding company founded by the private equity firm Providence Equity Partners. The sale was finalized on March 14, 2008. However, Newport Television could not keep KION-TV or KMUV-LP due to Providence Equity Partners' partial ownership of several media properties which serve parts of the market. KION and KMUV were sold to the Cowles Publishing Company, the owner of KHQ-TV and The KHQ Television Group in Spokane, Washington. The sale was finalized on May 7, 2008. On that day, Cowles took over the LMA for KCBA from Newport Television.

=== Sale to News-Press & Gazette Company ===
On September 20, 2013, News-Press & Gazette Company announced that it would purchase KION-TV and KMUV-LP, as well as San Luis Obispo sister station KKFX-CA. NPG will also take over some of the operations of Santa Maria sister station KCOY-TV, which Cowles will retain, under a shared services agreement (as NPG's holdings in the area already include KEYT-TV in Santa Barbara). The sale was completed on December 13.

== Subchannels ==
KMUV-LD's transmitter is located on Fremont Peak. The station's signal is multiplexed:

Subchannels of KMUV-LD
Channel	Res.	Short name	Programming
23.1	1080i	KMUV-LD	Telemundo
23.2	480i	SMUV	Dabl
46.1	720p	KION-TV	CBS (KION-TV 46.1)
46.2	720p	FOX35	Fox (KION-TV 46.2)

Simulcast of subchannels of another station
