= Newport Television =

Media conglomerate

Newport Television, LLC
- Company type: Private
- Industry: Media
- Predecessor: Television arm of Clear Channel Communications
- Founded: 2007; 19 years ago
- Founder: Providence Equity Partners and Sandy DiPasquale
- Defunct: June 1, 2013; 12 years ago
- Fate: Acquired by Nexstar, Sinclair, and Cox
- Successor: Nexstar Broadcasting Group; Sinclair Broadcast Group; Cox Media Group
- Headquarters: Kansas City, Missouri
- Key people: Sandy DiPasquale; (President, CEO)
- Services: Television
- Owner: Providence Equity Partners

Newport Television, LLC was a television station holding company founded by Providence Equity Partners and Sandy DiPasquale in 2007 to acquire the television stations owned by Clear Channel Communications.

== History ==
In September 2007, Newport agreed to sell KFTY and KVOS-TV to LK Station Group LLC for $26.6 million. The deal was set to be completed in March 2008 but eventually collapsed due to LK's lender refusing to provide the funding; KFTY (now KEMO-TV) and KVOS have since been sold to other companies. As of October 10, 2007, Newport had agreed to sell KION-TV, KMUV-LP, K44DN, KKFX-CA, KCOY-TV to Cowles Publishing Company for $41 million. Newport's purchase of the Clear Channel stations and those being resold were granted conditional Federal Communications Commission (FCC) approval, subject to divestitures of media properties owned by other affiliates of Providence Equity Partners in several other markets. The entire deal closed on March 14, 2008, after several stations, in addition to those being divested by Newport, were placed into trust companies.

In March 2012, Providence Equity Partners began to explore strategic alternatives for Newport Television, which may lead to a sale of the group. In July 2012, it was officially confirmed that Nexstar Broadcasting Group would acquire twelve of Newport's stations, Sinclair Broadcast Group would acquire six, and Cox Media Group would acquire four. As part of the same deal, Newport's CMS operations, branded as Inergize Digital, would go to Nexstar. This deal was followed eight days later by the announcement that WXXA-TV in Albany, New York would be sold to Shield Media, LLC, who would then enter into joint sales and shared services agreements with Young Broadcasting's WTEN.

Four other Newport stations were not part of either of the July 2012 deals, with the company continuing to pursue buyers for those stations; Nexstar would announce its acquisition of two of those stations, KGET-TV in Bakersfield, California and KGPE in Fresno, on November 5. On November 26, Newport announced that KMTR would be sold to Fisher Communications. Because Fisher already owned KVAL-TV, Fisher assigned the rights to acquire the FCC license to Roberts Media, LLC (a company wholly unrelated to the bankrupt Roberts Broadcasting), which Fisher then entered into a Joint Sales and Shared Services Agreement with KVAL.

On October 23, the FCC granted approval to the sale of the Jacksonville and Tulsa stations to Cox, plus the Albany station to Shield Media. This was followed the next day by the FCC approval of the July sale of the stations to Nexstar except for the two in Little Rock being sold to Mission Broadcasting, which were later approved on December 10. On November 19, the FCC granted approval of the remaining stations from the July deal to Sinclair.

Nineteen of the stations involved in the July deal were consummated on December 3, 2012. On the same day, Sinclair announced that they would acquire non-license assets of WHAM-TV, while the license was transferred to Deerfield Media. On January 23, 2013, the FCC granted approvals of the Newport California stations to Nexstar; and on January 30, the FCC granted approval to the WHAM transaction to Sinclair. On April 24, 2013, the FCC granted its approval on Newport's final station, KMTR to Roberts Media. This was after an announcement that Fisher was being sold to Sinclair for $373 million, two weeks prior. On June 1, the KMTR sale was consummated, completing the disestablishment of the company.

== Former stations ==
- Stations are arranged in alphabetical order by state and city of license.

Stations owned by Newport Television
Media market	State	Station	Purchased	Sold	Notes
Mobile	Alabama	WPMI-TV	2008	2012	
Mobile	Alabama	WJTC	2008	2012	
Fairbanks	Alaska	KTVF	2008	2012	
Little Rock	Arkansas	KLRT-TV	2008	2013	
Little Rock	Arkansas	KASN	2008	2013	
Bakersfield	California	KGET-TV	2008	2013	(Note: Owned by a third party and operated by Newport.)
Bakersfield	California	KKEY-LP	2008	2013	
Fresno	California	KGPE	2008	2013	
Monterey–Salinas	California	KION-TV	2008	2008	(Note: Placed into a divestiture trust after purchase.)
Monterey–Salinas	California	KCBA	2008	2008	
Monterey–Salinas	California	KMUV-LP	2008	2008	
San Francisco	California	KFTY	2008	2011	
Santa Maria	California	KCOY-TV	2008	2008	
Santa Maria	California	KKFX-CA	2008	2008	
Jacksonville	Florida	WAWS	2008	2012	
Jacksonville	Florida	WTEV-TV	2008	2012	
Hoisington	Kansas	KOCW	2008	2012	(Note: Satellite of KSAS-TV.)
Salina	Kansas	KAAS	2008	2012	
Wichita	Kansas	KSAS-TV	2008	2012	
Wichita	Kansas	KMTW	2008	2012	
Albany–Schenectady	New York	WXXA-TV	2008	2012	
Binghamton	New York	WBGH-CA	2008	2012	
Binghamton	New York	WIVT	2008	2012	
Elmira	New York	WETM-TV	2008	2012	
Rochester	New York	WHAM-TV	2008	2013	
Syracuse	New York	WSYR-TV	2008	2012	
Watertown	New York	WWTI	2008	2012	
Cincinnati	Ohio	WKRC-TV	2008	2012	
Tulsa	Oklahoma	KOKI-TV	2008	2012	
Tulsa	Oklahoma	KMYT-TV	2008	2012	
Coos Bay	Oregon	KMCB	2008	2013	(Note: Satellite of KMTR.)
Eugene	Oregon	KMTR	2008	2013	
Roseburg	Oregon	KTCW	2008	2013	
Harrisburg	Pennsylvania	WHP-TV	2008	2012	
Harrisburg	Pennsylvania	WLYH-TV	2008	2012	
Jackson	Tennessee	WJKT	2008	2012	
Memphis	Tennessee	WPTY-TV	2008	2012	
Memphis	Tennessee	WLMT	2008	2012	
San Antonio	Texas	WOAI-TV	2008	2012	
Salt Lake City	Utah	KTVX	2008	2012	
Salt Lake City	Utah	KUCW	2008	2012	
Bellingham	Washington	KVOS-TV	2008	2012	

=== Variety Television Network ===
Variety Television Network (also referred to as VTV or the Variety Channel) was a digital subchannel operated by Newport Television on various US DTV stations including 6 owned by Clear Channel; The network went off the air in early January 2009.
