= DoubleVerify =

Advertising technology company

DoubleVerify (NYSE: DV), or DoubleVerify Holdings, Inc., is a publicly traded software company that provides measurement technology, data, and services for digital advertising. Founded in 2008 and headquartered in New York City, the company works with advertisers, agencies, and publishers. It has offices in North America, EMEA, LATAM, and APAC.

== Overview ==
DoubleVerify is a technology company that provides digital advertising measurement, data, and services. Its products are used to assess whether ads are delivered according to specified criteria, including factors such as viewability, "attention," and invalid traffic. The technology is used across channels including websites, mobile applications, connected television, and social media platforms.

DoubleVerify has also released a product called AI Verification, which evaluates the impact of AI web crawlers and "bots" on ad campaigns, and technology to identify "AI slop" websites.

== History ==
DoubleVerify was founded in 2008. In 2010, the company introduced software related to brand safety, followed by the release of viewability measurement tools in 2013 and fraud detection services in 2014. The company's data and products are used across platforms, including Facebook, YouTube, TikTok, Roku, and NBCUniversal.

In 2017, Providence Equity Partners acquired a controlling interest in the company. In 2021, DoubleVerify listed on the New York Stock Exchange. The company has completed acquisitions in recent years, including Scibids in July 2023 and Rockerbox in February 2025.

In August 2026, Nielsen Holdings agreed to buy DoubleVerify for about $2.15 billion.
