= KGET-TV =

Television station in Bakersfield, California

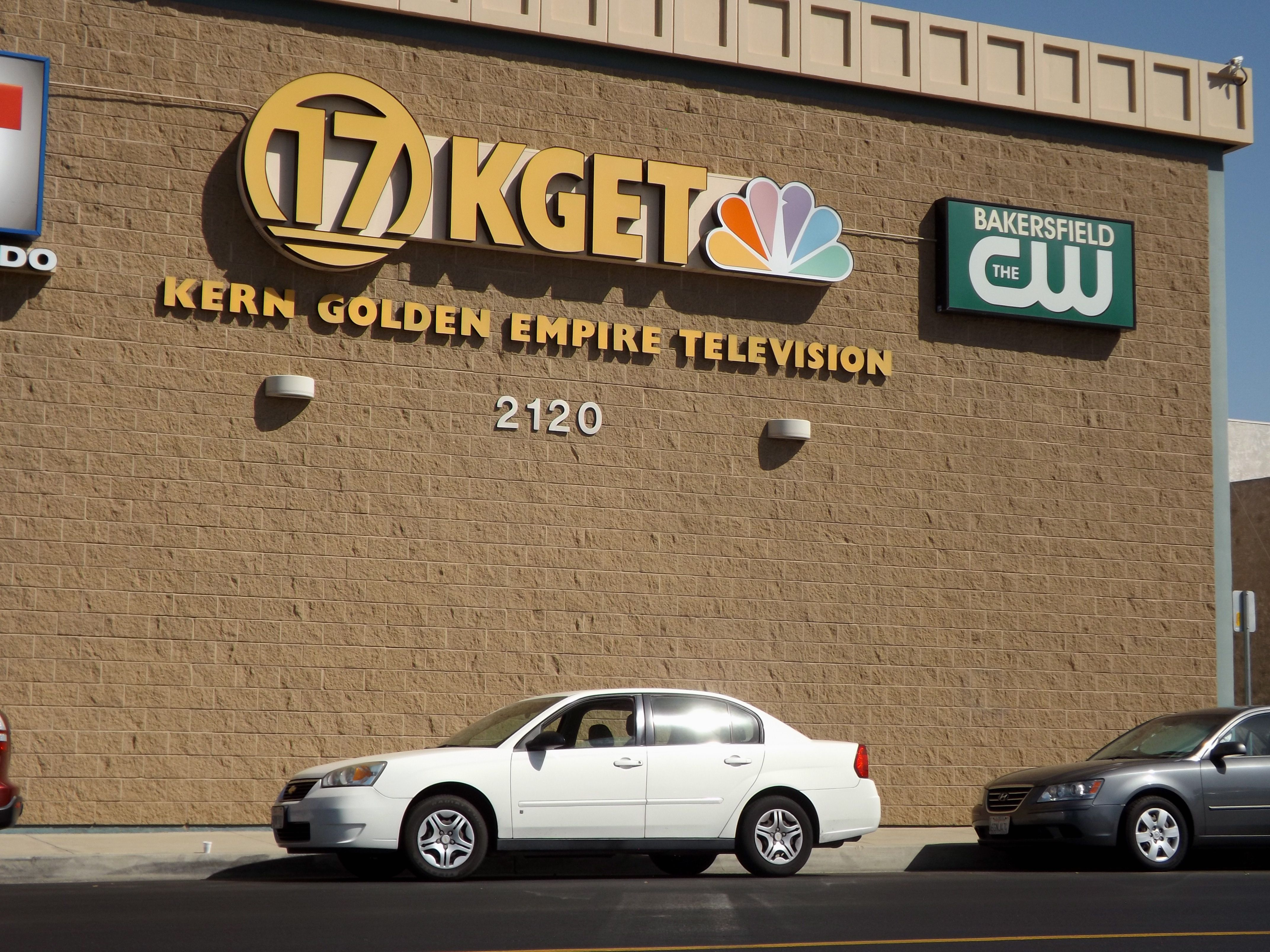
- KGET building (2013, before repaint)
- Bakersfield, California; United States
- Channels: Digital: 25 (UHF); Virtual: 17
- Branding: KGET 17; 17 News; Bakersfield CW (17.2); Telemundo Valle Central (17.3)

Programming
- Affiliations: 17.1: NBC; 17.2: CW+; for others, see § Subchannels

Ownership
- Owner: Nexstar Media Group; (Nexstar Media Inc.)
- Sister stations: KKEY-LD

History
- First air date: November 8, 1959
- Former call signs: KICU (CP, 1958–1959); KLYD-TV (1959–1969); KJTV (1969–1978); KPWR-TV (1978–1984); KGET (1984–2002)
- Former channel numbers: Analog: 17 (UHF, 1959–2009)
- Former affiliations: ABC (1959–1974); CBS (1974–1984)
- Call sign meaning: "Kern Golden Empire Television"

Technical information
- Licensing authority: FCC
- Facility ID: 34459
- ERP: 135 kW
- HAAT: 405 m (1,329 ft)
- Transmitter coordinates: 35°26′17.1″N 118°44′26.3″W

Links
- Public license information: Public file; LMS
- Website: www.kget.com

KGET-TV (channel 17) is a television station in Bakersfield, California, United States, affiliated with NBC and The CW Plus. It is owned by Nexstar Media Group alongside low-power Telemundo affiliate KKEY-LD (channel 13). The two stations share studios on L Street in Downtown Bakersfield; KGET-TV's transmitter is located atop Mount Adelaide.

== History ==
Logo used from 2012 until 2014.

Founded by businessman Ed Urner, channel 17 first broadcast on November 8, 1959, as KLYD-TV, an ABC affiliate. The station originally operated from studios located on Eye Street in Bakersfield. It was co-owned with KLYD-AM 1350 (now KLHC), and is one of very few TV stations to be started by a daytime-only radio station. Urner would sold the station to Dellar Broadcasting in 1962. The call letters changed to KJTV in 1969. Also that same year, the Dellars sold the station to Atlantic States Industries. On August 5, 1974, KJTV swapped affiliations with KBAK-TV (channel 29), becoming a CBS affiliate.

George N. Gillett Jr.'s Gillett Broadcasting bought the station from ASI Communications in 1978. The station's call letters changed again to KPWR-TV on September 27, 1978, when it increased its power to 5,000,000 watts. The KJTV calls were then used on Fox affiliates in Amarillo and Lubbock, Texas. The Ackerley Group purchased the station in 1983. On February 1, 1984, the station changed its calls to the present day KGET, which added the "-TV" suffix in 2002, coinciding with an affiliation swap with KERO-TV (channel 23) to become Bakersfield's NBC affiliate a month later, an affiliation which continues to the present day. It is one of a handful of stations in the United States to have held a primary affiliation with all of the Big Three television networks. In 1997, Channel 17 decided to relocate from their original location on Eye Street to their current studios on L Street (in a building formerly owned by Pacific Bell). It was sold to Clear Channel Communications (now iHeartMedia) in 2001.

KGET stands for "Kern Golden Empire Television," a moniker coined by the station's longtime vice president and general manager, Ray Watson, who was elected to the Kern County Board of Supervisors in 2002. The current KGET manager is Derek Jeffery.

On April 20, 2007, Clear Channel entered into an agreement to sell its entire television stations group to Newport Television, a broadcasting holding company controlled by Providence Equity Partners. However, Providence Equity Partners owns a 19 percent share of the Spanish-language media company Univision, the owner of MyNetworkTV affiliate KUVI-TV (channel 45). In addition, with only five full-power stations, Bakersfield does not have enough to legally support a co-owned duopoly operation. As a result, the Federal Communications Commission granted conditional approval of the sale, provided that Providence Equity Partners divest either KGET or its stake in Univision as soon as the deal was finalized. That happened on March 14, 2008.

In May 2008, Newport Television agreed to sell KGET and five other stations to High Plains Broadcasting, Inc. due to the aforementioned ownership conflict. The sale closed on September 15, 2008; Newport continued to operate KGET under a shared services agreement. Newport agreed to sell KGET and sister Telemundo affiliate KKEY-LP, as well as KGPE in Fresno, California, to Nexstar Broadcasting Group on November 5, 2012. The FCC approved the sale on January 23, 2013; and the sale was completed on February 19.

On December 3, 2018, Nexstar announced it would acquire the assets of Chicago-based Tribune Media for $6.4 billion in cash and debt. The deal—which would make Nexstar the largest television station operator by total number of stations upon its expected closure late in the third quarter of 2019—would result in KGET and KKEY-LP gaining additional sister stations in nearby markets including Los Angeles (CW affiliate KTLA) and San Diego (Fox affiliate KSWB-TV). The station was removed from AT&T U-verse and DirecTV on July 4, 2019, because of an ongoing dispute between AT&T and Nexstar.

== Programming ==
KGET-TV airs preseason games and special programming from the Las Vegas Raiders via a deal signed between the team and KGET owner Nexstar Broadcasting. Since 2022, KGET airs 11 Los Angeles Clippers regular season games a year syndicated from Nexstar sister station KTLA.

== Technical information ==
=== Subchannels ===
The station's signal is multiplexed:

Subchannels of KGET-TV
Channel	Res.	Short name	Programming
17.1	1080i	KGET-DT	NBC
17.2	720p	CW	The CW Plus
17.3	480i	TELM	Telemundo (KKEY-LD) (4:3)
17.4	480i	Laff	Laff (4:3)

Simulcast of subchannels of another station

=== Analog-to-digital conversion ===
KGET-TV ended regular programming on its analog signal, over UHF channel 17, on June 12, 2009, the official date on which full-power television stations in the United States transitioned from analog to digital broadcasts under federal mandate. The station's digital signal remained on its pre-transition UHF channel 25, using virtual channel 17.
