= Sandy DiPasquale =

American television executive

Sandy DiPasquale is an American broadcast media executive. DiPasquale has held ownership positions in such broadcast companies as WGRZ Acquisition Group, Smith Broadcasting (KWCH Television), Sunrise Television, Bluestone Television and Newport Television. A native of Buffalo, New York, DiPasquale spent almost 20 years in Wichita, Kansas, where most of the aforementioned broadcast groups were headquartered. In 2008 DiPasquale moved his newest venture, Newport Television, to Kansas City, Missouri.
