= KDJT-CD =

Television station in Salinas–Monterey, California

- Salinas–Monterey–Santa Cruz, California; United States
- City: Salinas–Monterey, etc., California
- Channels: Digital: 26 (UHF), shared with KSMS-TV; Virtual: 33
- Branding: UniMás Salinas-Monterey-Santa Cruz

Programming
- Affiliations: 33.1: UniMás

Ownership
- Owner: Entravision Communications; (Entravision Holdings, LLC)
- Sister stations: KSMS-TV

History
- First air date: November 30, 1989
- Former call signs: K33DJ (1989–2001); KDJT-CA (2001–2015)
- Former channel numbers: Analog: 33 (UHF, 1993–2015); Digital: 33 (UHF, 2015–2019)
- Former affiliations: Spanish music videos (1989–2002); TeleFutura (2002–2013)
- Call sign meaning: K33DJ Television (from original callsign)

Technical information
- Licensing authority: FCC
- Facility ID: 52888
- Class: CD
- ERP: 15 kW
- HAAT: 707.3 m (2,321 ft)
- Transmitter coordinates: 36°45′22.8″N 121°30′8.7″W

Links
- Public license information: Public file; LMS

KDJT-CD (channel 33) is a low-power, Class A television station licensed to both Salinas and Monterey, California, United States, serving the Monterey Bay area as an affiliate of the Spanish-language UniMás network. It is owned by Entravision Communications alongside Monterey-licensed Univision affiliate KSMS-TV (channel 67). KDJT-CD and KSMS-TV share studios on Garden Court south of Monterey Regional Airport in Monterey; through a channel sharing agreement, the two stations transmit using KDJT-CD's spectrum from an antenna atop Fremont Peak.

== Subchannel ==
Subchannels of KDJT-CD and KSMS-TV
| License | Subchannel | Res. | Short name | Programming |
|---|---|---|---|---|
| KDJT-CD | 33.1 | 1080i | UniMas | UniMas |
| KSMS-TV | 67.1 | 1080i | Univisn | Univision |
| KSMS-TV | 67.3 | 480i | LATV | LATV |
