= Jonathan M. Nelson =

American businessman and investor (born 1956)

Jonathan Nelson
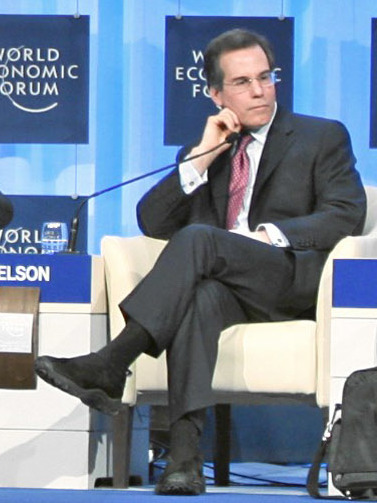
- Born: Jonathan Milton Nelson; 1956 (age 69–70); Providence, Rhode Island, U.S.
- Education: Brown University (BA); Harvard University (MBA)
- Occupation: Founder of Providence Equity Partners

Jonathan Milton Nelson (born 1956) is an American billionaire businessman. He is the founder of Providence Equity Partners, a global private equity firm based in Providence, Rhode Island, which manages funds with over US$45 billion in commitments. As of September 2023, Nelson's net worth is estimated by Forbes at $3.4 billion.

== Early life and education ==
Nelson grew up in Providence. He graduated from Brown University in 1977 with a Bachelor of Arts in economics. After graduation, he managed the Chinese division of Wellman, Inc. On returning to the United States, he earned a Master of Business Administration from Harvard Business School in 1983.

== Career history ==
In 1983, Nelson joined Narragansett Capital, a private equity firm, where he was a managing director. At Narragansett, he specialized in the broadcasting, cable television and publishing sectors.

In 1989, he founded Providence Equity Partners, a pioneering sector-focused private equity firm. It is the world's leading private equity investment firm focused on media, communications, education, and information investments. He was dubbed the "stealth mogul" by The New York Times for keeping a low profile despite his firm's substantial media holdings.

In 2008, Nelson and other Providence principals launched Providence's credit investment arm with Thomas Gahan of Deutsche Bank. The unit is called Benefit Street Partners, which has US$9.16 billion (inflation-adjusted) under management.

Nelson is on the boards of the Chernin Group, MLS Media, the Institute for Advanced Study in Princeton, New Jersey, Television Broadcasts Ltd and Univision Communications. he has also been a director of Eircom Plc, Hulu, Language Line, MetroNet (now AT&T Canada), VoiceStream Wireless (now Deutsche Telekom), Warner Music Group, (now Alltel Wireless) and Yankees Entertainment & Sports Network.

In September of 2020, Nelson announced he would transition from CEO of Providence Equity to Executive Chairman in January 2021. In 2022 he launched Dynasty Equity, a sports-focused private equity firm.

== Philanthropy and other activities ==
=== Educational philanthropy ===
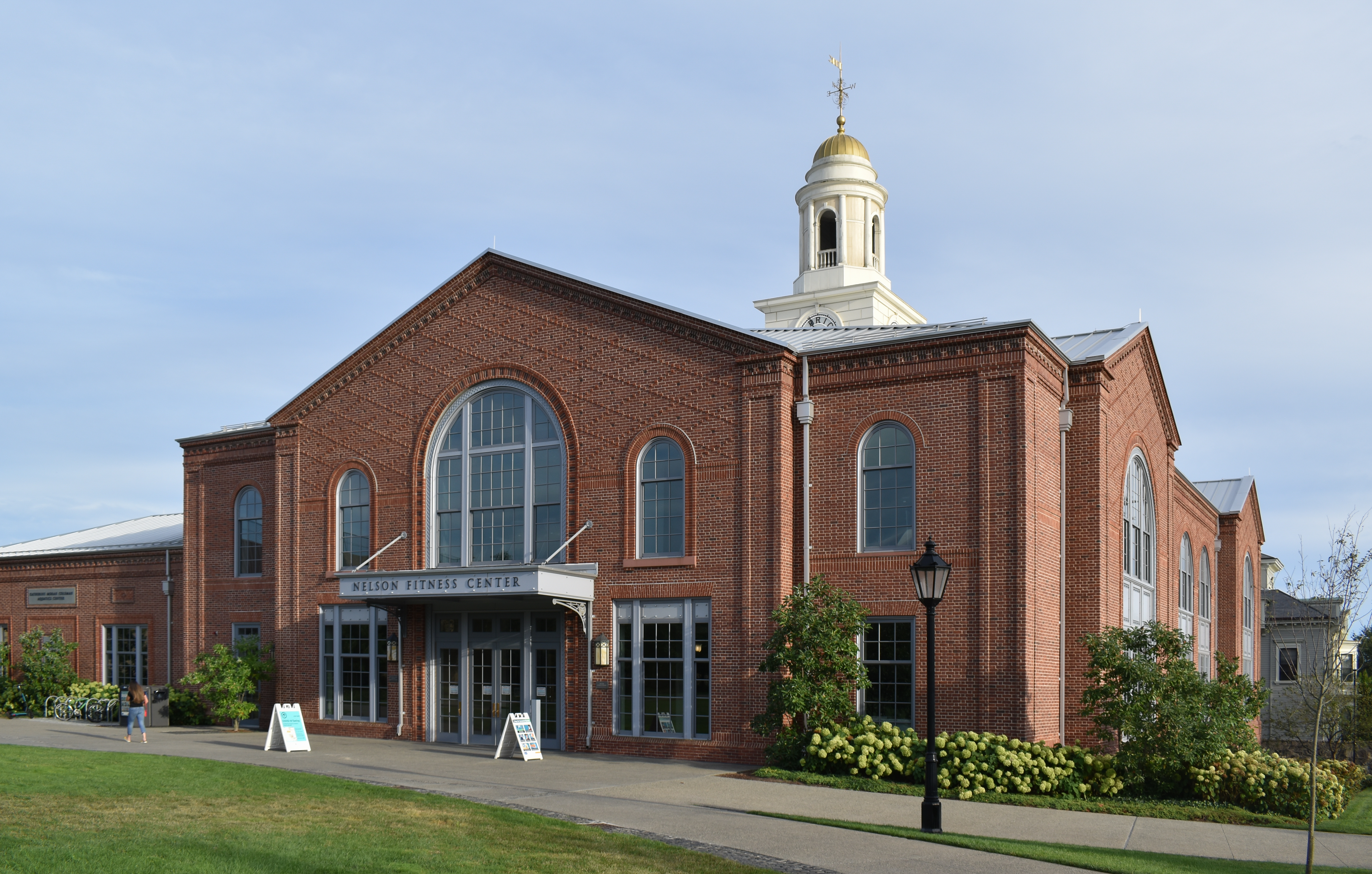
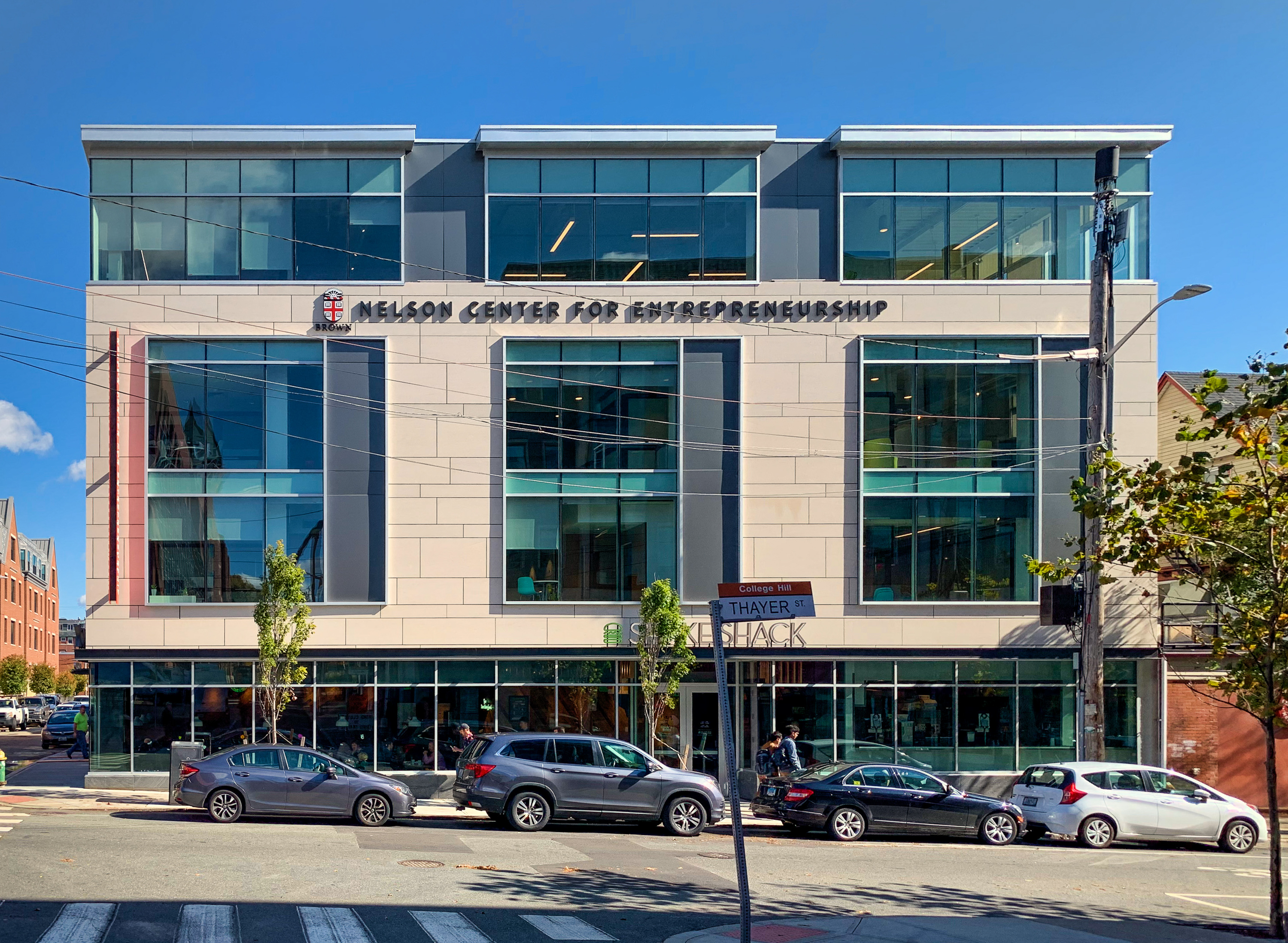
The Nelson Fitness Center and Nelson Center for Entrepreneurship at Brown University

As of March 2019, Nelson is listed as a Fellow of Brown University, and has previously been a trustee. He has donated at least $36 million to the university, contributing to the construction of the Nelson Fitness Center and establishment of the Nelson Center for Entrepreneurship and endowment of two professorships. As of January 2025, these professorships are held by the mathematician Brendan Hassett and the philosopher Paul Guyer. In 2013, The Institute of Classical Architecture and Art named Nelson the winner of the Arthur Ross Award for Excellence In The Classical Tradition (Patronage) for his guidance of the design and construction of the Nelson Fitness Center. In 2018, Following a $25 million gift from Nelson, Brown established the Nelson Center for Entrepreneurship. Nelson is a trustee of Rockefeller University. In August 2014, Harvard Business School gave Nelson an Alumni Achievement Award, the highest honor bestowed by the school on its graduates.

Nelson has committed to the Giving Pledge, a campaign led by Warren Buffett and Bill Gates to encourage the wealthiest people in the United States to make a commitment to give most of their wealth to philanthropic causes. He is on the board of the Newport Festivals Foundation. He is an avid sailor and big mountain skier.

== See also ==
- History of private equity and venture capital
- Leveraged buyout
