= Sharon Tay =

Singaporean–Ameeican real estate agent, television news anchor and reporter

- Born: October 15; Singapore
- Education: Boston University
- Occupations: Anchor, reporter (1986–2020); Real estate agent (2020–present)
- Employer(s): BNN (1986–1992); KMST-TV (1992); KTLA-TV (1992–2004); MSNBC (2005); KCBS-TV/KCAL-TV (2007–2020)
- Awards: Emmy Award (5 times); Associated Press Award (3 times)

Sharon Tay (born October 15) is a Singaporean–American real estate agent, retired television news anchor and reporter. She was anchor of the KTLA Morning News and with KCBS-TV/KCAL-TV, and did entertainment news reporting with MSNBC.

== Early life and education ==
Tay was born in Singapore and immigrated to the United States at the age of seven. Her family settled in Connecticut for several years before relocating to the Philippines. She spent her sophomore year at the International School Manila and then returned to the United States to complete her high-school education at a boarding school in Massachusetts. Tay attended Boston University, where she obtained a Bachelor of Science degree in Broadcast Journalism, with a minor in International Relations.

== Career ==
Tay's first television news job was at a small cable news company in Boston, where she anchored, wrote, and produced a weekend news program. In 1993, KMST-TV, now KION in Salinas, California, hired her as a general assignment reporter/consumer investigative reporter. Tribune Broadcasting then recruited Tay as a general assignment reporter for KTLA. She went on to become a weekend anchor and then was promoted to anchoring the early portion of the KTLA Morning News.

Tay then departed KTLA in 2004 for MSNBC, where she hosted entertainment features and weekend programming, including MSNBC at the Movies and the Entertainment Hot List. Tay subsequently returned to Los Angeles local news to anchor and report for KCBS-TV/KCAL-TV, including the latter's primetime newscast. In November 2013, Tay began to anchor the KCBS-TV morning and midday newscasts, then returned to KCAL's 4 p.m. and 9 p.m. newscasts in October 2018.

On May 27, 2020, she departed CBS Los Angeles as part of COVID-era cuts and attrition at the stations after the close of the 2019 merger of CBS and Viacom.
