= KSES-FM =

Radio station in Seaside, California

- Seaside, California; United States
- Broadcast area: Santa Cruz, California
- Frequency: 107.1 MHz
- Branding: La Suavecita 107.1

Programming
- Format: Regional Mexican

Ownership
- Owner: Entravision Communications; (Entravision Holdings, LLC)
- Sister stations: KLOK-FM, KMBX

History
- First air date: November 22, 1972
- Former call signs: KMBY-FM (1972–1994); KVRG (1994–1995); KVRG-FM (1995–1999)
- Call sign meaning: Super Estrella (previous format)

Technical information
- Licensing authority: FCC
- Facility ID: 3155
- Class: A
- ERP: 1,750 watts
- HAAT: 190 meters (620 ft)
- Transmitter coordinates: 36°33′9″N 121°47′17″W

Links
- Public license information: Public file; LMS

KSES-FM (107.1 FM) is a regional Mexican-formatted radio station licensed to Seaside, California, United States, broadcasting to the Santa Cruz area. The station is currently owned by Entravision Communications.

KSES-FM is part of Entravision's Suavecita radio network.

On January 8, 2018, KSES-FM changed their format from Spanish adult hits (as "Jose") to Regional Mexican, branded as "Radio La Suavecita".
