= KMBX =

- Soledad, California; United States
- Broadcast area: Salinas Valley
- Frequency: 700 kHz

Programming
- Language: Spanish
- Format: Catholic
- Network: ESNE Radio

Ownership
- Owner: Entravision Communications; (Entravision Holdings, LLC)
- Operator: El Sembrador Ministries
- Sister stations: KLOK-FM, KSES-FM

History
- First air date: 1992
- Former call signs: KQKE (1992–1994); KSUR (1994–1995); KVRG (1995–1999); KSES (1999–2001)

Technical information
- Licensing authority: FCC
- Facility ID: 64041
- Class: B
- Power: 2,500 watts (day); 700 watts (night)
- Transmitter coordinates: 36°27′50.9″N 121°17′55.7″W

Links
- Public license information: Public file; LMS
- Webcast: Listen live
- Website: elsembradorministries.com/principal.html

KMBX (700 AM) is a radio station broadcasting a Spanish religious format. Licensed to Soledad, California, United States, the station is currently owned by Entravision Holdings, LLC and operated by El Sembrador Ministries.

== History ==
KMBX started broadcasting in 1992. Its original call letters were KQKE, which on December 14, 1994, were changed to KSUR, and on February 1, 1995, became KVRG.

Former logo

=== Expanded Band assignment ===
On March 17, 1997, the Federal Communications Commission (FCC) announced that eighty-eight stations had been given permission to move to newly available "Expanded Band" transmitting frequencies, ranging from 1610 to 1700 kHz, with KVRG authorized to move from 700 to 1700 kHz. However, the station never procured the Construction Permit needed to implement the authorization, so the expanded band station was never built.

The station's call sign was changed to KSES on September 9, 1999, and to KMBX on December 3, 2001.
