= Ackerley Group =

American media company (1975–2002)

The Ackerley Group
- Company type: Public
- Industry: Broadcasting, Media
- Founded: 1975; 51 years ago
- Founder: Barry Ackerley
- Defunct: June 14, 2002; 24 years ago
- Fate: Merged with Clear Channel Communications
- Successor: Clear Channel Communications
- Headquarters: Seattle, Washington
- Products: Television

The Ackerley Group was an American media company founded by businessman Barry Ackerley that owned and operated several radio stations in Seattle, Washington, as well as television stations across the United States (primarily in New York and California, as well as one in Fairbanks, Alaska). The company also owned the NBA Seattle SuperSonics and WNBA Seattle Storm professional basketball teams. The Ackerley Group was sold to Clear Channel Communications (now iHeartMedia) in 2002.

Ackerley announced its sale to Clear Channel Communications on October 8, 2001; the merger was completed on June 14, 2002. At the time of the closure of the transaction, the sale price was reported to be 38 times cashflow (approximately $1.1B USD), the highest ever sale valuation for a North American publicly traded media company in the history of the NYSE. The record setting high price tag was attributed to the overwhelming market monopoly position of the Ackerley Group's Out of Home Media (billboards) marketplace in the Washington, Oregon, Massachusetts and South Florida media markets- all areas where Clear Channel was devoid of inventory. Barry Ackerley and his immediate family owned approximately 82% of the company stock at the time of the sale.

== Former stations ==
- Stations are arranged in alphabetical order by state and city of license.

Stations owned by the Ackerley Group
Media market	State	Station	Purchased	Sold	Notes
Fairbanks	Alaska	KTVF	1999	2002	
Bakersfield	California	KGET-TV	1983	2002	
Eureka	California	KVIQ	1998	2000	
Fresno	California	KGPE	2000	2002	(Note: Known as KJEO prior to 2000.)
Salinas–Monterey	California	KCBA	1986	2000	(Note: Operated by Ackerley from 2000 until 2002.)
Salinas–Monterey	California	KION	2000	2002	(Note: Operated by Ackerley from 1994 until 2000.)
Santa Barbara	California	KCOY-TV	1999	2002	
San Francisco–Oakland	California	KFTY	1996	2002	
Colorado Springs–Pueblo	Colorado	KKTV	1983	1999	
Binghamton	New York	WIVT	1998	2002	
Binghamton	New York	WBGH-CA	2000	2002	
Elmira	New York	WETM-TV	2000	2002	(Note: Owned by a third party.)
Rochester	New York	WOKR	1999	2002	
Syracuse	New York	WIXT-TV	1982	2002	
Utica	New York	WUTR	1997	2002	
Watertown	New York	WWTI	2000	2002	
Eugene–Springfield	Oregon	KMTR	1999	2002	
Bellingham	Washington	KVOS-TV	1985	2002	
