= KLOK-FM =

Regional Mexican radio station in Greenfield, California

- Greenfield, California; United States
- Broadcast area: Santa Cruz, California
- Frequency: 99.5 MHz
- Branding: La Tricolor 99.5|99.9

Programming
- Format: Regional Mexican

Ownership
- Owner: Entravision Communications; (Entravision Holdings, LLC)
- Sister stations: KMBX, KSES-FM

History
- First air date: January 1, 1994
- Former call signs: KSUR-FM (1994); KKHI-FM (1994); KSUR-FM (1994–1995)
- Call sign meaning: "Clock"

Technical information
- Licensing authority: FCC
- Facility ID: 49100
- Class: B
- ERP: 30,000 watts
- HAAT: 195 meters (640 ft)
- Transmitter coordinates: 36°27′50.8″N 121°17′55.7″W
- Repeater: 99.9 K260AA (Carmel Valley)

Links
- Public license information: Public file; LMS
- Webcast: Listen live
- Website: elboton.com/nacional/radiolatricolor

KLOK-FM (99.5 FM) is a radio station broadcasting a regional Mexican format. Licensed to Greenfield, California, United States, the station serves the Santa Cruz area. The station is currently owned by Entravision Communications.

== History ==
The station went on the air as KSUR-FM on New Year's Day 1994. On July 15, 1994, the station changed its call sign to KKHI-FM; on September 30 that same year, the call changed back to KSUR-FM; then once more on January 17, 1995, to the current KLOK-FM.
