= Gabilan Range =

Mountain range in the American state of California

- Gabilán Range
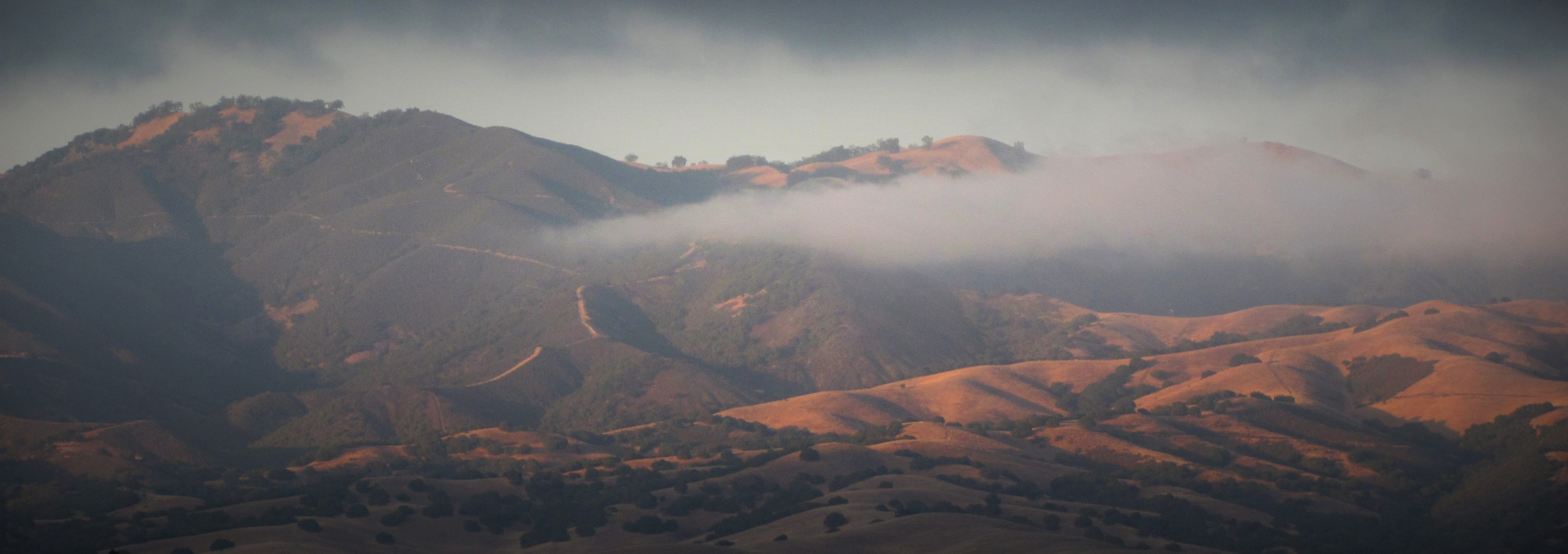
- Gabilan Range panorama.

Highest point
- Peak: Fremont Peak
- Elevation: 1,053 m (3,455 ft)

Geography
- Location within California
- Country: United States
- State: California
- District(s): San Benito County & Monterey County
- Range coordinates: 36°36′39.864″N 121°18′52.750″W
- Topo map: USGS Mount Johnson

The Gabilan Range or Gabilán Range (Spanish for "sparrow hawk") is a mountain range in the inner California Coast Ranges System, located in Monterey County and San Benito County of central California. Pinnacles National Park is located in the southern section of the range.

== Geography ==
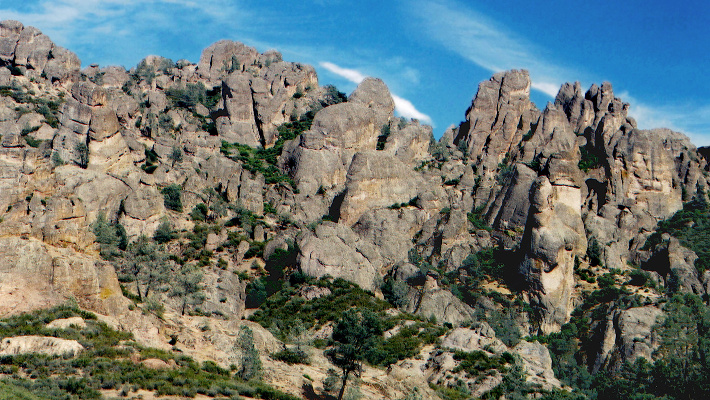
Gabilan Mountains in Pinnacles National Park

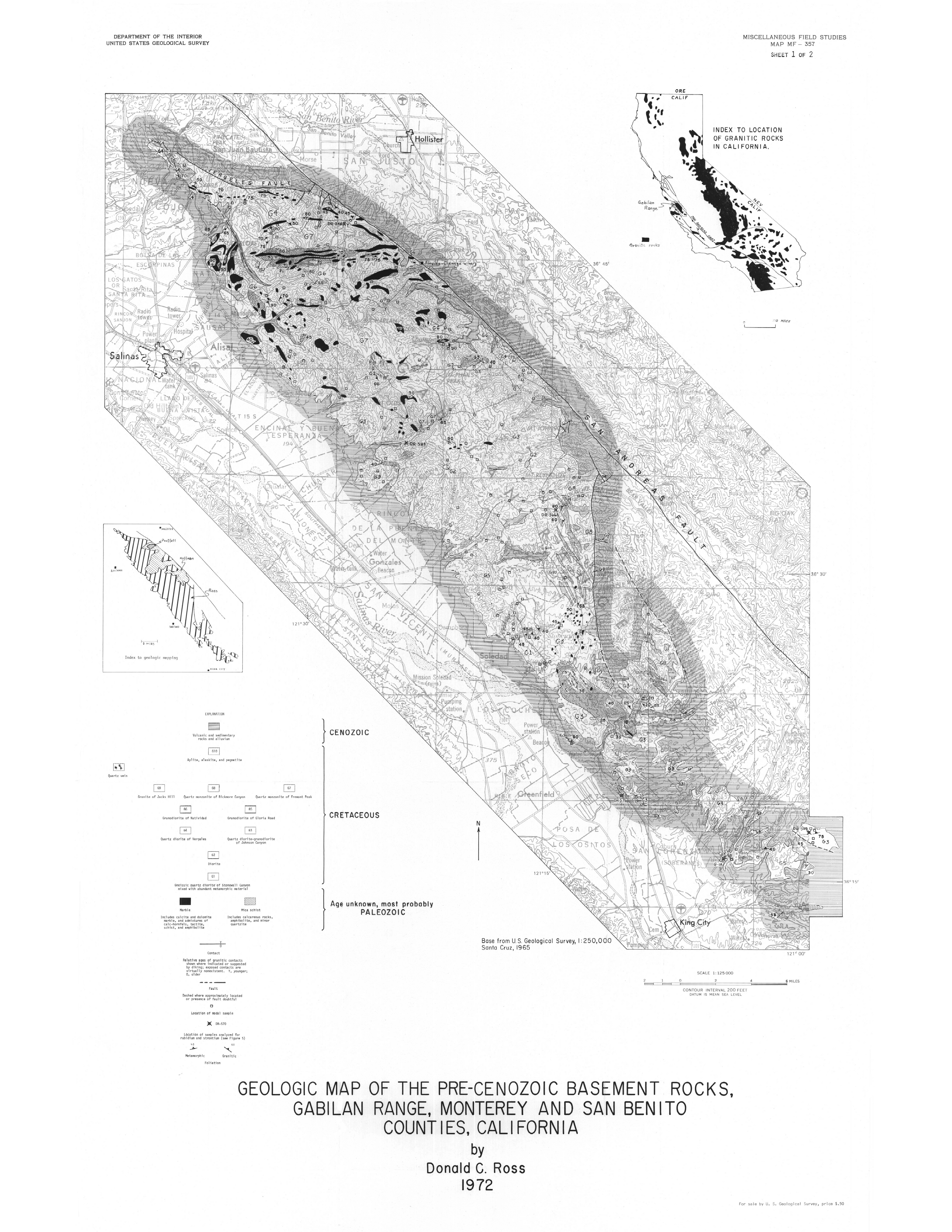
Geologic map of the pre-Cenozoic basement rocks of the Gabilan Range in Monterey and San Benito Counties, California

The Gabilan Range trends in a northwest–southeast direction along the Monterey County and San Benito County line. It is bordered on the northeast by the San Andreas Fault, the San Benito River and State Route 25 which separate it from the Diablo Range to the east; and on the west by the Salinas Valley, the Salinas River and U.S. Route 101 which separate it from the Santa Lucia Range nearer the Pacific Coast. The northern limit of the Gabilan Range lies just south of Pinecate Peak and San Juan Bautista, California. According to the USGS GNIS, GPS coordinates for the southern border of the Gabilan Range follow Chalone Creek which enters the Salinas River east of Greenfield, California. Chalone Creek is the principal drainage of Pinnacles National Park.

Mount Johnson (California), at 3,467 feet (1,057 m) in elevation, is the range's highest point. There are several other peaks also over 3,000 feet (910 m) in the range.

== History ==
In Spanish, gavilán (gabilan is an older alternate rendering) means "sparrow hawk". Hawks, especially the red-tailed hawk, are common in the range.

The Gabilan Mountains and other nearby places are mentioned in several novels by John Steinbeck, such as Of Mice and Men and East of Eden. In The Red Pony notably, the main character (Jody Tiflin) names his pony "Gabilan" after the mountain range. The mountains also appear in the 1875 memoirs of Major General William Tecumseh Sherman.

Fremont Peak was named for John C. Frémont, an American explorer and a Captain in the U.S. Army Corps of Topographical Engineers who assessed the military value of the peak in 1846, posing a threat to the Mexican authorities. It is now a California State Park.

== Ecology ==
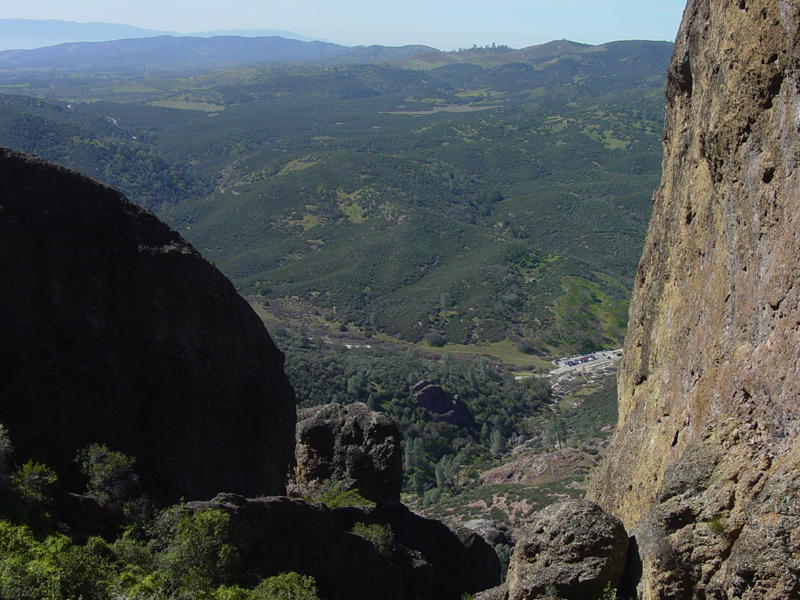
View west from the Gabilan Mountains, Pinnacles National Park

One of the last relatively undeveloped corridors for wildlife passage between the southern Santa Cruz Mountains and the northern Gabilan Range runs from lands between Mount Pajaro and Rancho Juristac, in southern Santa Cruz and Santa Clara counties respectively, south across California State Route 129 and U.S. Highway 101 to lands between Pinecate Peak and San Juan Bautista in San Benito County. The Land Trust of Santa Cruz County has protected the first block of land intended to protect the Santa Cruz Mountains-Gabilan Range Wildlife Corridor, the 2,640 acres (4.13 sq mi) Rocks Ranch in Aromas at the border of San Benito and Monterey counties.

== See also ==
- Gabilan Range topics
- California interior chaparral and woodlands
- Pinnacles National Park
