= Providence Equity =

American global private equity investment firm

Providence Equity Partners L.L.C.
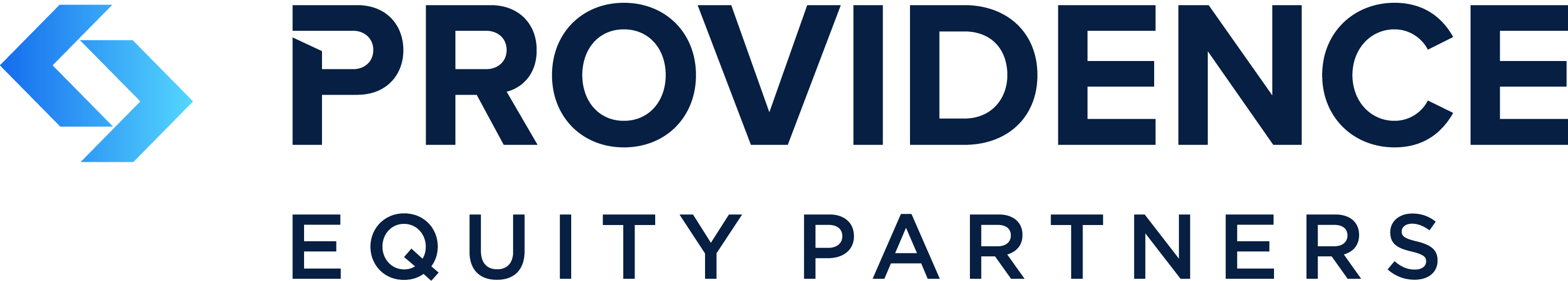

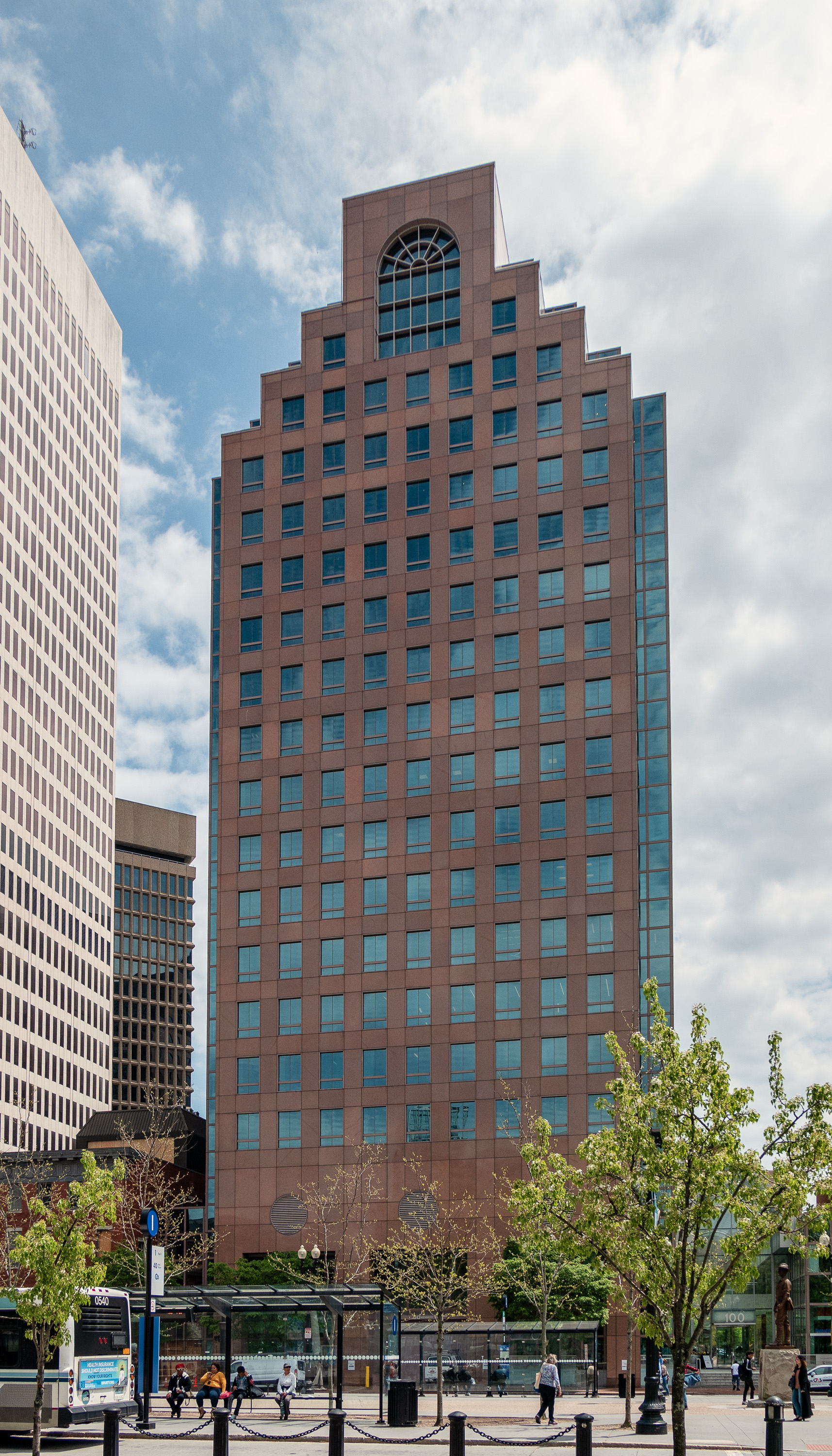
- Headquarters at 50 Kennedy Plaza
- Type: Private
- Industry: Private equity
- Founded: 1989; 37 years ago
- Founder: Jonathan M. Nelson (founder and executive chairman)
- Headquarters: 50 Kennedy Plaza; Providence, Rhode Island, U.S.
- Key people: Michael Dominguez (CIO)
- Products: Leveraged buyouts, Growth capital
- AUM: $35 billion (2023)
- Number of employees: 180
- Website: www.provequity.com

Providence Equity Partners (Providence) is a specialist private equity investment firm focused on media, communications, education, and technology investments across North America and Europe. The firm specializes in growth-oriented private equity investments and has invested in more than 170 companies globally since its inception in 1989.

The firm manages funds with over $31 billion in aggregate private equity capital commitments, making it a large global player in the private equity industry. Providence was one of the principal pioneers of a sector-based approach to private equity investing. The firm's eighth fund, Providence Equity Partners VIII, closed on $6 billion in 2019, above its $5 billion target. The prior fund, Providence VII, closed with $5 billion in 2013.

Providence is headquartered in Providence, Rhode Island, with additional offices in New York City, Boston, London and Atlanta.

== Operations ==
The firm raises investment funds from a broad array of institutional investors, including pension funds, endowments, sovereign wealth funds, financial institutions, insurance companies, fund of funds, and high-net-worth individuals.

Providence partners with companies at various stages of development, from growth capital and complex recapitalizations of family-owned businesses to large buyouts and take-privates. The firm targets equity investments of $150 million to $500 million and can employ a variety of financing structures. Providence prefers to lead its investments, serve on company boards, and work collaboratively with company management.

== History ==
In 2008, Providence hired Thomas Gahan as president of the firm's new capital markets group and its affiliate, Benefit Street Partners. Prior to joining Providence, Gahan was head of Deutsche Bank's corporate and investment banking in the Americas and chief executive officer of Deutsche Bank Securities. Benefit Street Partners closed on a $1.75 billion middle market direct lending fund in April 2014. The credit platform was sold to Franklin Templeton Investments in October 2018.

In 2014, Providence established Providence Strategic Growth (PSG), its growth equity affiliate focused on investments in lower middle market software and technology-enabled service companies. PSG is headquartered in Boston, Massachusetts, with offices in London and Kansas City.

Providence's investments have included AutoTrader.com Group, Blackboard Inc., Conversica, eircom, Hulu, Kabel Deutschland, MLS Media, NEW Asurion, Bluestone Television, Newport Television, Univision, VoiceStream (now T-Mobile US), Warner Music Group, Western Wireless, and World Triathlon Corporation (Ironman), YES Network and TopGolf.

Since 2013, significant investments by the firm include 365 Retail Markets, Ambassador Theatre Group, DoubleVerify, Learfield Communications, GlobalTranz, Groupe La Centrale, MásMóvil Group, n2y, Node4, Smartly.io, TAIT, Tenstreet, and TCP.

Providence's recent exits include TES, Galileo Global Education, EdgeConneX, OEConnection, PADI, Ascend Learning, Vector Solutions and ZeniMax Media.

In March 2013, Providence and the National Football League formed a global partnership to invest primarily in sports and entertainment related media assets.

In September 2012, Providence sold a less than 10% stake in the firm to Florida's state pension system and a sovereign wealth fund.

In February 2015, Providence's $800 million stake in security screener Altegrity was wiped out when the security company was accused of fraud and filed for bankruptcy. This followed a series of other expensive losses that Providence blamed on investments outside of its expertise made during the peak of the 2007 and 2008 private equity boom.

In February 2017, Providence expanded its education business by buying NACE Schools, a Spain-based operator of for-profit schools. As of 2021, the schools portfolio branded as Globeducate has 55 schools in nine countries.

In October 2017, Modern Times Group sold its telecommunication businesses in the Baltic states to Providence Equity Partners. The newly acquired companies were united and operate under the All Media Baltics company name (currently TV3 Group).

In April 2019, MasMovil agreed to repurchase its convertible bond from Providence Equity. Providence remains a shareholder in the company.

In September 2019, Providence Strategic Growth collected $2 billion for its fourth fund.

In August 2021, it was announced that Providence Equity had purchased a majority share of Sweetwater Sound, a major musical equipment retailer based in Fort Wayne, Indiana.

In April 2022, it was announced Providence had acquired the cloud-based managed Wi-Fi solutions provider, Airties.

== Key people ==
In September 2020, Providence announced a leadership transition plan, under which founder and CEO Jonathan M. Nelson would become Executive Chairman in January 2021. As part of this planned transition, Providence appointed Davis Noell and David Phillips senior managing directors and co-heads of North America, and Karim Tabet and Andrew Tisdale senior managing directors and co-heads of Europe. Managing Director Michael Dominguez was appointed Chief Investment Officer.
