= Fremont Peak (California) =

Mountain in the American state of California

Fremont Peak Gabilán Peak
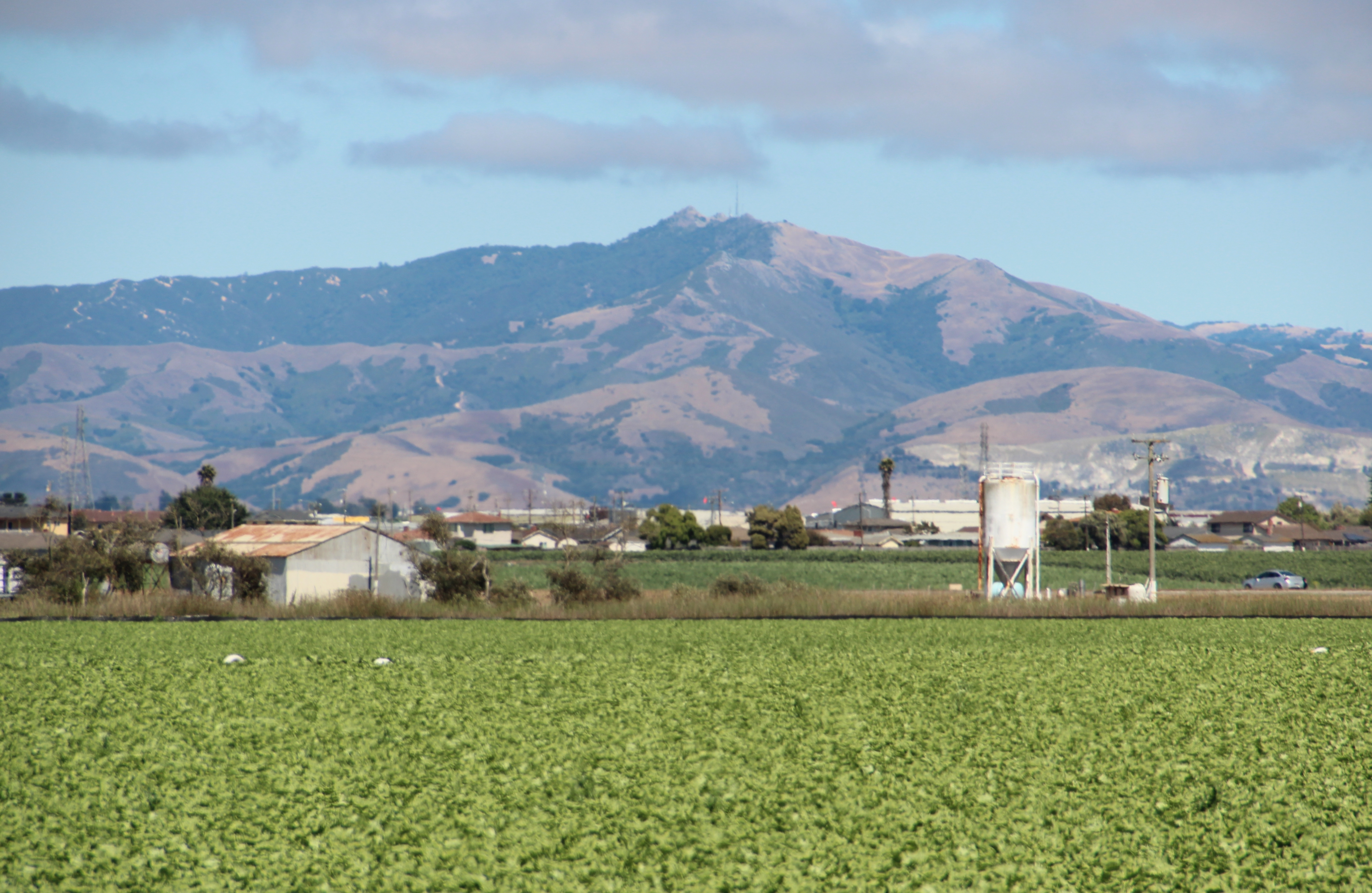
- Fremont Peak viewed from California State Route 1

Highest point
- Elevation: 3,173 ft (967 m) NAVD 88
- Coordinates: 36°45′26″N 121°30′15″W

Naming
- Etymology: John C. Frémont

Geography
- Location within California
- Location: Monterey and San Benito counties, California, U.S.
- Parent range: Gabilan Range
- Topo map: USGS San Juan Bautista

California Historical Landmark
- Reference no.: 181

Fremont Peak or Frémont Peak, historically known as Gabilán Peak, is a summit in the Gabilan Range, one of the mountain ranges paralleling California's central coast. The peak affords clear views of the Salinas Valley, Monterey Bay, the southern part of the Santa Clara Valley, and surrounding mountain ranges. It is located on Rocky Ridge, 11 miles (18 km) northeast of Salinas, California.

The peak is the site of Fremont Peak State Park which was established with 188 acres (76 ha) in 1936. Today the park has camping and picnic facilities, and is favored by astronomers for its clear views unsullied by artificial light. The Fremont Peak Observatory Association maintains a 30-inch (760 mm) diameter f/4.8 Newtonian "Challenger" telescope which was built by telescope maker Kevin Medlock in the early 1980s. The peak is also the site of the transmitters for television stations such as KSBW and KCBA and for radio stations such as KDON-FM.

== History ==
Previously called Gavilan Peak, it is now named for John C. Frémont, an American explorer and a Captain in the U.S. Army Corps of Topographical Engineers at the time. In 1846, he and a crew of 60 armed surveyors mounted the peak to assess its military value. The peak commands the inland approach from Monterey. As a response to the threat, local Mexican authority General José Castro ordered Frémont and his men to leave California. In defiance, Frémont built a crude stockade and raised a modified American flag above the peak (or, according to some sources, on a lower peak nearby). The U.S. Consul in Monterey, Thomas O. Larkin supported Castro's decision to evict Frémont, and his men were duly ordered out of the area. Frémont took providence from a windy night which blew down the makeshift flagpole to hasten himself and his men from the peak. The peak is now registered as California Historical Landmark #181.

Following a ride to the summit on March 4, 1906, Frémont Peak Day was inaugurated by local residents. Nineteen years later, the Native Sons of the Golden West installed a commemorative plaque on the summit.

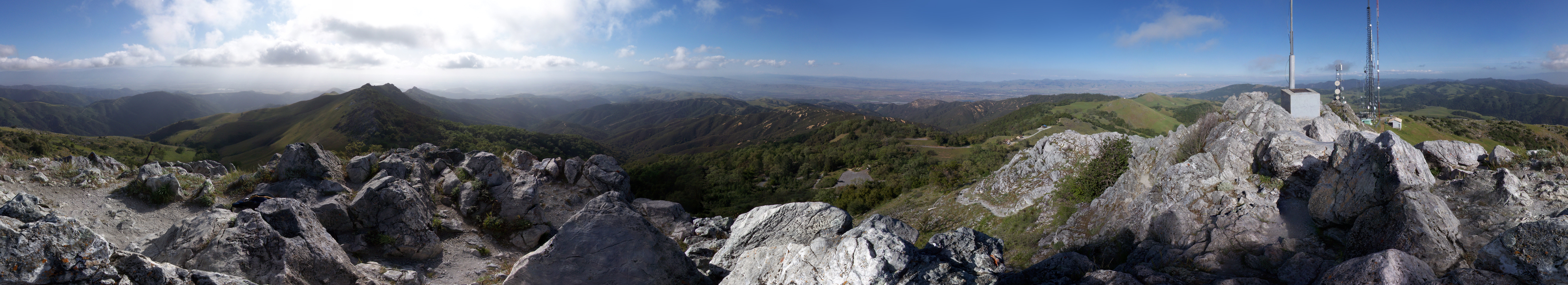
360° panorama from the top of Fremont Peak

== Geology ==
Fremont Peak lies along the Rocky Ridge fault, and is the largest of many small pendants and septa of pre-Cretaceous metasedimentary rocks in the deeply eroded granitic terrain of the northern Gabilan Range.
