= List of ATSC 3.0 television stations in the United States =

This is a list of United States television stations which broadcast using the ATSC 3.0 standard, branded as "NextGen TV".

Market	Lighthouse station	RF channel	Stations carried	Affiliation/programming	Channel	Notes
Alamosa, CO	K33QV-D	33	KNME-TV	PBS	5	
Alamosa, CO	K33QV-D	33	KNME-TV	PBS Kids	5.2	
Alamosa, CO	K33QV-D	33	KNME-TV	FNX	5.3	
Alamosa, CO	K33QV-D	33	KNME-TV	World	5.4	
Alamosa, CO	K33QV-D	33	KNME-TV	Create	5.5	
Albany/Schenectady/Troy, NY	WCWN	22	WRGB	CBS	6	
Albany/Schenectady/Troy, NY	WCWN	22	T2		6.10	
Albany/Schenectady/Troy, NY	WCWN	22	Pickleball TV		6.11	
Albany/Schenectady/Troy, NY	WCWN	22	WTEN	ABC	10	
Albany/Schenectady/Troy, NY	WCWN	22	WMHT	PBS	17	
Albany/Schenectady/Troy, NY	WCWN	22	WXXA	Fox	23	
Albany/Schenectady/Troy, NY	WCWN	22	WCWN	The CW	45	
Albuquerque/Santa Fe, NM	KNMD-TV	8	KNMD-TV	PBS	5	
Albuquerque/Santa Fe, NM	KNMD-TV	8	KNMD-DT2	PBS Kids	5.2	
Albuquerque/Santa Fe, NM	KNMD-TV	8	KNMD-DT3	FNX	5.3	
Albuquerque/Santa Fe, NM	KNMD-TV	8	KNMD-DT4	World	5.4	
Albuquerque/Santa Fe, NM	KNMD-TV	8	KNMD-DT5	Create	5.5	
Albuquerque/Santa Fe, NM	KASY-TV	36	KOAT-TV	ABC	7	
Albuquerque/Santa Fe, NM	KASY-TV	36	KRQE-TV	CBS	13	
Albuquerque/Santa Fe, NM	KASY-TV	36	KRQE-DT2	Fox	13.2	
Albuquerque/Santa Fe, NM	KASY-TV	36	KWBQ-TV	The CW	19	
Albuquerque/Santa Fe, NM	KASY-TV	36	KASY-TV	MyNetworkTV	50	
Atlanta, GA	WTBS-LD	6	WTBS-LD	France24	6	
Atlanta, GA	WPCH-TV	31	WSB-TV	ABC	2	
Atlanta, GA	WPCH-TV	31	WAGA-TV	Fox	5	
Atlanta, GA	WPCH-TV	31	WXIA-TV	NBC	11	
Atlanta, GA	WPCH-TV	31	WPCH-TV	The CW	17	
Atlanta, GA	WPCH-TV	31	WANF	Independent	46	
Austin, TX	KXLK-CD	14	KTBC	Fox	7	
Austin, TX	KXLK-CD	14	KTFO-CD	UniMás	31	
Austin, TX	KXLK-CD	14	KXLK-CD	MyNetworkTV	40	
Austin, TX	KXLK-CD	14	KAKW-DT	Univision	62	
Austin, TX	KBVO-CD	31	KBVO-CD	MyNetworkTV	14	
Austin, TX	KBVO-CD	31	KXAN-TV	NBC	36	
Austin, TX	KBVO-CD	31	KEYE-TV	CBS	42	
Austin, TX	KBVO-CD	31	KNVA	The CW	54	
Baltimore, MD	WNUV	25	WMAR-TV	ABC	2	
Baltimore, MD	WNUV	25	WBAL-TV	NBC	11	
Baltimore, MD	WNUV	25	WMPT	PBS	22	
Baltimore, MD	WNUV	25	WBFF	Fox	45	
Baltimore, MD	WNUV	25	WNUV	The CW	54	
Birmingham/Anniston/Tuscaloosa, AL	WTTO	21	WBRC	Fox	6	
Birmingham/Anniston/Tuscaloosa, AL	WTTO	21	WVTM-TV	NBC	13	
Birmingham/Anniston/Tuscaloosa, AL	WTTO	21	WTTO	Independent	21	
Birmingham/Anniston/Tuscaloosa, AL	WTTO	21	T2		21.10	
Birmingham/Anniston/Tuscaloosa, AL	WTTO	21	Pickleball TV		21.11	
Birmingham/Anniston/Tuscaloosa, AL	WTTO	21	WIAT	The CW	42	
Birmingham/Anniston/Tuscaloosa, AL	WTTO	21	WBMA-LD	ABC	68.2	
Birmingham/Anniston/Tuscaloosa, AL	WSES	36	WDBB	Independent	17.1	
Birmingham/Anniston/Tuscaloosa, AL	WSES	36	WBMA-LD	ABC	17.2	
Birmingham/Anniston/Tuscaloosa, AL	WSES	36	WSES	H&I	33	
Boston, MA	WWJE-DT	27	WWJE-DT (via WCVB-TV)	True Crime Network	50	
Boston, MA	WUNI	27				
Boston, MA	WUNI	27	WGBH-TV	PBS	2	
Boston, MA	WUNI	27	WBZ-TV	CBS	4	
Boston, MA	WUNI	27	WCVB-TV	ABC	5	
Boston, MA	WUNI	27	WBTS-CD	NBC	15	
Boston, MA	WUNI	27	WFXT	Fox	25	
Boston, MA	WUNI	27	WUNI	Univision	66	
Buffalo, NY	WNYO-TV	16	WGRZ	NBC	2	
Buffalo, NY	WNYO-TV	16	WIVB-TV	CBS	4	
Buffalo, NY	WNYO-TV	16	WKBW-TV	ABC	7	
Buffalo, NY	WNYO-TV	16	WUTV	Fox	29	
Buffalo, NY	WNYO-TV	16	T2		29.10	
Buffalo, NY	WNYO-TV	16	Pickleball TV		29.11	
Buffalo, NY	WNYO-TV	16	WNYO-TV	MyNetworkTV	49	
Charleston, SC	WGWG	34	WCBD-TV	NBC	2	
Charleston, SC	WGWG	34	WGWG	H&I	4	
Charleston, SC	WGWG	34	WCSC-TV	CBS	5	
Charleston, SC	WGWG	34	WTAT-TV	Fox	24	
Charleston, SC	WGWG	34	WCIV-DT2	ABC	36.2	
Charleston, SC	WGWG	34	T2		36.10	
Charleston, SC	WGWG	34	Pickleball TV		36.11	
Charleston/Huntington, WV	WSAZ-TV	22	WSAZ-TV	NBC	3	
Charleston/Huntington, WV	WSAZ-TV	22	WCHS-TV	ABC	8	
Charleston/Huntington, WV	WSAZ-TV	22	T2		8.10	
Charleston/Huntington, WV	WSAZ-TV	22	WVAH-TV	Catchy Comedy	11	
Charleston/Huntington, WV	WSAZ-TV	22	WOWK-TV	CBS	13	
Charleston/Huntington, WV	WSAZ-TV	22	WQCW	The CW	30	
Charlotte, NC	WAXN-TV	32	WBTV	CBS	3	
Charlotte, NC	WAXN-TV	32	WSOC-TV	ABC	9	
Charlotte, NC	WAXN-TV	32	WCNC-TV	NBC	36	
Charlotte, NC	WAXN-TV	32	WJZY	Fox	46	
Charlotte, NC	WAXN-TV	32	WAXN-TV		64	
Chicago, IL	WRME-LD	6	WRME-LD	Jewelry Television	6	
Chicago, IL	WBBM-TV	12	WBBM-TV	CBS	2	
Chicago, IL	WBBM-TV	12	WMAQ-TV	NBC	5	
Chicago, IL	WBBM-TV	12	WGN-TV	The CW	9	
Chicago, IL	WBBM-TV	12	WFLD	FOX	32	
Chicago, IL	WBBM-TV	12	WGBO-DT	Univision	66	
Cincinnati, OH	WSTR-TV	18	WLWT	NBC	5	
Cincinnati, OH	WSTR-TV	18	WCPO-TV	ABC	9	
Cincinnati, OH	WSTR-TV	18	WKRC-TV	CBS	12	
Cincinnati, OH	WSTR-TV	18	WXIX-TV	Fox	19	
Cincinnati, OH	WSTR-TV	18	WSTR-TV	MyNetworkTV	64	
Cincinnati, OH	WCVN-TV	22	WCET	KET	54.1	
Cincinnati, OH	WCVN-TV	22	WCET	KET2	54.2	
Cincinnati, OH	WCVN-TV	22	WCET	World	54.5	
Cincinnati, OH	WCVN-TV	22	WPTO	PBS	14	
Cincinnati, OH	WCVN-TV	22	WCET	PBS	48	
Cleveland, OH	WBNX-TV	17	WKYC	NBC	3	
Cleveland, OH	WBNX-TV	17	WEWS-TV	ABC	5	
Cleveland, OH	WBNX-TV	17	WJW	FOX	8	
Cleveland, OH	WBNX-TV	17	WOIO	CBS	19	
Cleveland, OH	WBNX-TV	17	WBNX-TV	The CW	55	
Colorado Springs, CO	K30JM-D	30				
Columbus, OH	WWHO	23	WCMH-TV	NBC	4	
Columbus, OH	WWHO	23	WSYX	ABC	6	
Columbus, OH	WWHO	23	WSYX-DT3	Fox	6.3	
Columbus, OH	WWHO	23	WTTE	TBD	28	
Columbus, OH	WWHO	23	WWHO	The CW	53	
Dallas/Fort Worth, TX	K26KC-D	26	K26KC-D3	TBN	7	
Dallas/Fort Worth, TX	K26KC-D	26	K26KC-D2	TBN Inspire	7.2	
Dallas/Fort Worth, TX	K26KC-D	26	K26KC-D3	Smile		
Dallas/Fort Worth, TX	KSTR-DT	34	KDFW	Fox	4	
Dallas/Fort Worth, TX	KSTR-DT	34	KUVN-DT	Univision	23	
Dallas/Fort Worth, TX	KSTR-DT	34	KDAF	The CW	33	
Dallas/Fort Worth, TX	KSTR-DT	34	KSTR-DT	UniMás	49	
Dayton, OH	WRGT-TV	36	WDTN	NBC	2	
Dayton, OH	WRGT-TV	36	WHIO-TV	CBS	7	
Dayton, OH	WRGT-TV	36	WPTD	PBS	16	
Dayton, OH	WRGT-TV	36	WKEF	ABC	22	
Dayton, OH	WRGT-TV	36	WKEF	Fox	22.2	
Dayton, OH	WRGT-TV	36	T2		22.10	
Dayton, OH	WRGT-TV	36	Pickleball TV		22.11	
Dayton, OH	WRGT-TV	36	WRGT-TV	Dabl	45	
Denver, CO	KBRO-LD	2	KBRO-LD	Promos	34	
Denver, CO	KBRO-LD	2	KBRO-LD	Promos	34.2	
Denver, CO	KBRO-LD	2	KBRO-LD	Movies	34.3	
Denver, CO	KBRO-LD	2	KBRO-LD	Audio	34.4	
Denver, CO	KBRO-LD	2	KBRO-LD	Audio	34.5	
Denver, CO	KBRO-LD	2	KBRO-LD	Audio	34.6	
Denver, CO	KXDP-LD	6	KXDP-LD		17	
Denver, CO	KWGN-TV	34	KWGN-TV	The CW	2	
Denver, CO	KWGN-TV	34	KMGH-TV	ABC	7	
Denver, CO	KWGN-TV	34	KUSA	NBC	9	
Denver, CO	KWGN-TV	34	KDVR	Fox	31	
Des Moines, IA	KDSM-TV	16	KCCI	CBS	8	
Des Moines, IA	KDSM-TV	16	KDIN-TV	PBS	11	
Des Moines, IA	KDSM-TV	16	WHO-DT	NBC	13	
Des Moines, IA	KDSM-TV	16	KDSM-TV	Fox	17	
Des Moines, IA	KDSM-TV	16	T2		17.10	
Des Moines, IA	KDSM-TV	16	Pickleball TV		17.11	
Detroit, MI	WMYD	31	WJBK	Fox	2	
Detroit, MI	WMYD	31	WDIV-TV	NBC	4	
Detroit, MI	WMYD	31	WXYZ-TV	ABC	7	
Detroit, MI	WMYD	31	WMYD		20	
Detroit, MI	WMYD	31	WMYD		20.99	
Detroit, MI	WMYD	31	WWJ-TV	CBS	62	
El Paso, TX	KFOX-TV	15	KDBC-TV	CBS	4	
El Paso, TX	KFOX-TV	15	KVIA-TV	ABC	7	
El Paso, TX	KFOX-TV	15	KTSM-TV	NBC	9	
El Paso, TX	KFOX-TV	15	KFOX-TV	Fox	14	
El Paso, TX	KFOX-TV	15	KTDO	Telemundo	49	
Flint/Saginaw/Bay City, MI	WBSF	23	WNEM-TV	CBS	5	
Flint/Saginaw/Bay City, MI	WBSF	23	WJRT-TV	ABC	12	
Flint/Saginaw/Bay City, MI	WBSF	23	WEYI-TV	NBC	25	
Flint/Saginaw/Bay City, MI	WBSF	23	WBSF	The CW	46	
Flint/Saginaw/Bay City, MI	WBSF	23	WSMH	Fox	66	
Fort Wayne, IN	W30EH-D	30				
Fort Wayne, IN	WODP-LD	36				
Fresno/Visalia, CA	KMCF-LD	6	KMCF-LD	The Country Network	6	
Fresno/Visalia, CA	KFRE-TV	36	KSEE	NBC	24	
Fresno/Visalia, CA	KFRE-TV	36	KMPH-TV	Fox	26	
Fresno/Visalia, CA	KFRE-TV	36	KGPE	CBS	47	
Fresno/Visalia, CA	KFRE-TV	36	KNSO	Telemundo	50	
Fresno/Visalia, CA	KFRE-TV	36	KFRE-TV	The CW	59	
Grand Rapids/Kalamazoo/Battle Creek, MI	WXSP-CD	15	WWMT	CBS	3	
Grand Rapids/Kalamazoo/Battle Creek, MI	WXSP-CD	15	WOOD-TV	NBC	8	
Grand Rapids/Kalamazoo/Battle Creek, MI	WXSP-CD	15	WXSP-CD	MyNetworkTV	15	
Grand Rapids/Kalamazoo/Battle Creek, MI	WXSP-CD	15	WXMI	Fox	17	
Grand Rapids/Kalamazoo/Battle Creek, MI	WXSP-CD	15	WOTV	ABC	41	
Grand Rapids/Kalamazoo/Battle Creek, MI	WOLP-CD	35				
Green Bay/Appleton, WI	WCWF	15	WBAY-TV	ABC	2	
Green Bay/Appleton, WI	WCWF	15	WFRV-TV	CBS	5	
Green Bay/Appleton, WI	WCWF	15	WLUK-TV	Fox	11	
Green Bay/Appleton, WI	WCWF	15	T2		11.10	
Green Bay/Appleton, WI	WCWF	15	Pickleball TV		11.11	
Green Bay/Appleton, WI	WCWF	15	GameLoop TV		11.20	
Green Bay/Appleton, WI	WCWF	15	WCWF	The CW	14	
Green Bay/Appleton, WI	WCWF	15	WGBA-TV	NBC	26	
Greensboro/High Point/Winston-Salem, NC	WMYV	28	WGHP	Fox	8	
Greensboro/High Point/Winston-Salem, NC	WMYV	28	WXII-TV	NBC	12	
Greensboro/High Point/Winston-Salem, NC	WMYV	28	WXLV-TV	ABC	45	
Greensboro/High Point/Winston-Salem, NC	WMYV	28	T2		45.10	
Greensboro/High Point/Winston-Salem, NC	WMYV	28	Pickleball TV		45.11	
Greensboro/High Point/Winston-Salem, NC	WMYV	28	WMYV	MyNetworkTV	48	
Greenville/New Bern/Washington, NC	WUNK-TV	25	WUNK-TV	PBS	25	
Greenville/New Bern/Washington, NC	WUNK-TV	25	WUNK-TV	PBS Kids	25.2	
Greenville/New Bern/Washington, NC	WUNK-TV	25	WUNK-TV	PBS Encore	25.3	
Greenville/New Bern/Washington, NC	WUNK-TV	25	WUNK-TV	North Carolina Channel	25.4	
Greenville/Spartanburg/Anderson, SC/Asheville, NC	WMYA-TV	35	WYFF	NBC	3	
Greenville/Spartanburg/Anderson, SC/Asheville, NC	WMYA-TV	35	WSPA-TV	CBS	7	
Greenville/Spartanburg/Anderson, SC/Asheville, NC	WMYA-TV	35	WLOS	ABC	13	
Greenville/Spartanburg/Anderson, SC/Asheville, NC	WMYA-TV	35	WHNS	Fox	21	
Greenville/Spartanburg/Anderson, SC/Asheville, NC	WMYA-TV	35	WMYA-TV	Dabl	40	
Harrisburg/Lancaster/Lebanon/York, PA	W16EJ-D	16	WHTM-TV	ABC	27	
Harrisburg/Lancaster/Lebanon/York, PA	W16EJ-D	16	WITF	PBS	33	
Harrisburg/Lancaster/Lebanon/York, PA	W16EJ-D	16	WLYH		49	
Harrisburg/Lancaster/Lebanon/York, PA	WLHY-LD	31	WHTM-TV	ABC	27	
Harrisburg/Lancaster/Lebanon/York, PA	WLHY-LD	31	WITF	PBS	33	
Harrisburg/Lancaster/Lebanon/York, PA	WLHY-LD	31	WLYH		49	
Hartford/New Haven, CT	WCCT-TV	33	WFSB	CBS	3	
Hartford/New Haven, CT	WCCT-TV	33	WTNH	ABC	8	
Hartford/New Haven, CT	WCCT-TV	33	WCCT-TV	The CW	20	
Hartford/New Haven, CT	WCCT-TV	33	WVIT	NBC	30	
Hartford/New Haven, CT	WCCT-TV	33	WTIC-TV	Fox	61	
Hartford/New Haven, CT	WEDN	25	WEDN	PBS	25	
Hartford/New Haven, CT	WEDN	25	WEDN	PBS Kids	25.2	
Hartford/New Haven, CT	WEDN	25	WUNK-DT3	CPTV Spirit	25.3	
Honolulu, HI	KHII-TV	8	KHON-TV	Fox	2	
Honolulu, HI	KHII-TV	8	KITV	ABC	4	
Honolulu, HI	KHII-TV	8	KGMB	CBS	5	
Honolulu, HI	KHII-TV	8	KHII-TV	MyNetworkTV	9	
Honolulu, HI	KHII-TV	8	KHNL	NBC	13	
Honolulu, HI	KHII-TV	8	KHNL		13.2	
Houston, TX	KTXH	19	KTRK-TV	ABC	13	
Houston, TX	KTXH	19	KTXH	MyNetworkTV	20	
Houston, TX	KTXH	19	KRIV	Fox	26	
Houston, TX	KTXH	19	KXLN-DT	Univision	45	
Houston, TX	KTXH	19	KFTH-DT	UniMás	67	
Houston, TX	KIAH	34	KPRC-TV	NBC	2	
Houston, TX	KIAH	34	KUHT	PBS	8	
Houston, TX	KIAH	34	KHOU	CBS	11	
Houston, TX	KIAH	34	KIAH	The CW	39	
Houston, TX	KIAH	34	KTMD	Telemundo	47	
Indianapolis, IN	WTTK	15	WRTV	ABC	6	
Indianapolis, IN	WTTK	15	WTHR	NBC	13	
Indianapolis, IN	WTTK	15	WTTK	CBS	29	
Indianapolis, IN	WTTK	15	WXIN	Fox	59	
Indianapolis, IN	WFYI-LD	29	WFYI	PBS	20	
Indianapolis, IN	WFYI-LD	29	WFYI	PBS Kids	20.2	
Indianapolis, IN	WFYI-LD	29	WFYI	World	20.3	
Jacksonville, FL	WJXT-TV	18	WJXT		4	
Jacksonville, FL	WJXT-TV	18	WJCT	PBS	7	
Jacksonville, FL	WJXT-TV	18	WCWJ	The CW	17	
Jacksonville, FL	WJXT-TV	18	WCWJ	Bounce TV	17.2	
Kansas City, MO	KMCI-TV	25	WDAF-TV	Fox	4	
Kansas City, MO	KMCI-TV	25	KCPT	PBS	19	
Kansas City, MO	KMCI-TV	25	KMCI-TV		38	
Kansas City, MO	KMCI-TV	25	KSHB	NBC	41	
Kansas City, MO	KSMO-TV	32	KCTV	CBS	5	
Kansas City, MO	KSMO-TV	32	KMBC	ABC	9	
Kansas City, MO	KSMO-TV	32	KCWE	The CW	29	
Kansas City, MO	KSMO-TV	32	KSMO-TV	MyNetworkTV	62	
Las Vegas, NV	KGHD-LD	6	KGHD-LD	Diya TV	6	
Las Vegas, NV	KVCW	29	KSNV	NBC	3	
Las Vegas, NV	KVCW	29	T2		3.10	
Las Vegas, NV	KVCW	29	Pickleball TV		3.11	
Las Vegas, NV	KVCW	29	KVVU-TV	Fox	5	
Las Vegas, NV	KVCW	29	KLAS-TV	CBS	8	
Las Vegas, NV	KVCW	29	KTNV-TV	ABC	13	
Las Vegas, NV	KVCW	29	KVCW	The CW	33	
Little Rock/Pine Bluff, AR	KARZ-TV	28	KARK-TV	NBC	4	
Little Rock/Pine Bluff, AR	KARZ-TV	28	KATV	ABC	7	
Little Rock/Pine Bluff, AR	KARZ-TV	28	KTHV	CBS	11	
Little Rock/Pine Bluff, AR	KARZ-TV	28	KLRT-TV	Fox	16	
Little Rock/Pine Bluff, AR	KARZ-TV	28	KARZ-TV	MyNetworkTV	42	
Los Angeles, CA	KZNO-LD	6	KZNO-LD	Jewelry Television	12	
Los Angeles, CA	KCOP-TV	13	KCBS-TV	CBS	2	
Los Angeles, CA	KCOP-TV	13	KNBC	NBC	4	
Los Angeles, CA	KCOP-TV	13	KTLA	The CW	5	
Los Angeles, CA	KCOP-TV	13	KTTV	Fox	11	
Los Angeles, CA	KCOP-TV	13	KCOP-TV	MyNetworkTV	13	
Louisville, KY	WBKI	16				
Louisville, KY	WBKI	16	WAVE	NBC	3	
Louisville, KY	WBKI	16	WHAS-TV	ABC	11	
Louisville, KY	WBKI	16	WBNA		21	
Louisville, KY	WBKI	16	WLKY	CBS	32	
Louisville, KY	WBKI	16	WDRB	Fox	41	
Louisville, KY	WBKI	16	WBKI	The CW	58	
Louisville, KY	WKMJ-TV	34				
Louisville, KY	WKMJ-TV	34	WKMJ-TV	KET2	68	
Louisville, KY	WKMJ-TV	34	WKPC-TV	KET	15	
Louisville, KY	WKMJ-TV	34	WKMJ-TV	KET KY	68.3	
Louisville, KY	WKMJ-TV	34	WKMJ-TV	PBS Kids	68.4	
Louisville, KY	WKMJ-TV	34	WKMJ-TV	World	68.5	
Memphis, TN	WPGF-LD	6				
Miami, FL	WEYS-LD	6	WEYS-LD	Almavision	31	
Miami, FL	WTVJ	31	WPBT	PBS	2	
Miami, FL	WTVJ	31	WFOR-TV	CBS	4	
Miami, FL	WTVJ	31	WTVJ	NBC	6	
Miami, FL	WTVJ	31	WLTV-DT	Univision	23	
Miami, FL	WTVJ	31	WSCV	Telemundo	51	
Minneapolis/St. Paul, MN
Minneapolis/St. Paul, MN	WCMN-LD	14	WCMN-LD			
Minneapolis/St. Paul, MN	WUCW	22	WCCO-TV	CBS	4	
Minneapolis/St. Paul, MN	WUCW	22	KSTP-TV	ABC	5	
Minneapolis/St. Paul, MN	WUCW	22	KMSP-TV	Fox	9.9	
Minneapolis/St. Paul, MN	WUCW	22	KARE	NBC	11	
Minneapolis/St. Paul, MN	WUCW	22	WUCW	The CW	23	
Minneapolis/St. Paul, MN	KTCI-TV	23	KTCA-TV	PBS	2	
Minneapolis/St. Paul, MN	KTCI-TV	23	KTCA-TV	Minnesota Channel	2.2	
Minneapolis/St. Paul, MN	KTCI-TV	23	KTCA-TV	PBS/TPT Life	2.3	
Minneapolis/St. Paul, MN	KTCI-TV	23	KTCA-TV	Weather	2.4	
Mobile, AL/Pensacola/Fort Walton Beach, FL	WFNA	27	WKRG-TV	CBS	5	
Mobile, AL/Pensacola/Fort Walton Beach, FL	WFNA	27	WFGX	MyNetworkTV	35	
Mobile, AL/Pensacola/Fort Walton Beach, FL	WFNA	27	WFNA	The CW	55	
Mobile, AL/Pensacola/Fort Walton Beach, FL	WJTC	35	WEAR-TV	ABC	3	
Mobile, AL/Pensacola/Fort Walton Beach, FL	WJTC	35	T2		3.10	
Mobile, AL/Pensacola/Fort Walton Beach, FL	WJTC	35	Pickleball TV		3.11	
Mobile, AL/Pensacola/Fort Walton Beach, FL	WJTC	35	WALA-TV	Fox	10	
Mobile, AL/Pensacola/Fort Walton Beach, FL	WJTC	35	WPMI-TV	NBC	15	
Mobile, AL/Pensacola/Fort Walton Beach, FL	WJTC	35	WJTC		44	
Myrtle Beach/Florence, SC/Lumberton, NC	WWMB	26	WBTW	CBS	13	
Myrtle Beach/Florence, SC/Lumberton, NC	WWMB	26	WPDE-TV	ABC	15	
Myrtle Beach/Florence, SC/Lumberton, NC	WWMB	26	T2		15.10	
Myrtle Beach/Florence, SC/Lumberton, NC	WWMB	26	WWMB	Dabl	21	
Myrtle Beach/Florence, SC/Lumberton, NC	WWMB	26	WHMC	PBS	23	
Myrtle Beach/Florence, SC/Lumberton, NC	WWMB	26	WJPM-TV	PBS Kids	23.4	
Nashville, TN	WUXP-TV	21	WTVF	CBS	5	
Nashville, TN	WUXP-TV	21	WZTV	Fox	17	
Nashville, TN	WUXP-TV	21	WZTV	The CW	17.2	
Nashville, TN	WUXP-TV	21	WUXP-TV	MyNetworkTV	30	
Nashville, TN	WNAB	30	WKRN-TV	ABC	2	
Nashville, TN	WNAB	30	WSMV-TV	NBC	4	
Nashville, TN	WNAB	30	WNAB	Dabl	58	
Nashville, TN	WJNK-LD	34	WJNK-LD	TBN	34	
Nashville, TN	WJNK-LD	34	WJNK-LD	TBN Inspire	34.2	
Nashville, TN	WJNK-LD	34	WJNK-LD	Smile	34.3	
Nashville, TN	W35DZ-D	35	WCTE	PBS	35	
Nashville, TN	W35DZ-D	35	WCTE	World	35.2	
Nashville, TN	W35DZ-D	35	WCTE	Create	35.3	
Nashville, TN	W35DZ-D	35	WCTE	PBS Kids	35.4	
New Orleans, LA	WUPL	17	WWL-TV	CBS	4	
New Orleans, LA	WUPL	17	WDSU	NBC	6	
New Orleans, LA	WUPL	17	WVUE-DT	Fox	8	
New Orleans, LA	WUPL	17	WGNO	ABC	26	
New Orleans, LA	WUPL	17	WNOL-TV	The CW	38	
New Orleans, LA	WUPL	17	WUPL	MyNetworkTV	54	
New Orleans, LA	WLAE-TV	23	WYES-TV	PBS	12	
New Orleans, LA	WLAE-TV	23	WLAE-TV		32	
New York, NY	WNYZ-LD	6	WNYZ-LD	Korean	6	
New York, NY	WPIX	11	WABC-TV	ABC	7	
New York, NY	WPIX	11	WPIX	The CW	11	
New York, NY	WPIX	11	WPIX-DT2	Antenna TV	11.2	
New York, NY	WPIX	11	WPIX-DT4	Rewind TV	11.4	
New York, NY	WPIX	11	WXTV-DT	Univision	41	
New York, NY	WLIW	32	WCBS-TV	CBS	2	
New York, NY	WLIW	32	WNBC	NBC	4	
New York, NY	WLIW	32	WNET	PBS	13	
New York, NY	WLIW	32	WLIW	PBS	21	
New York, NY	WLIW	32	WMBQ-CD	FNX	46	
New York, NY	WLIW	32	WNJU	Telemundo	47	
New York, NY	WMBQ-CD	32	WNDT-CD	FNX	12	
Norfolk/Portsmouth/Newport News, VA	WMTO-LD	6				
Norfolk/Portsmouth/Newport News, VA	WNLO-CD	14	WAVY-TV	NBC	10	
Norfolk/Portsmouth/Newport News, VA	WNLO-CD	14	WTVZ-TV	MyNetworkTV	33	
Norfolk/Portsmouth/Newport News, VA	WNLO-CD	14	T2		33.10	
Norfolk/Portsmouth/Newport News, VA	WNLO-CD	14	Pickleball TV		33.11	
Norfolk/Portsmouth/Newport News, VA	WNLO-CD	14	WVBT	Fox	43	
Norfolk/Portsmouth/Newport News, VA	WNLO-CD	14	WNLO-CD	Fox	45	
Oklahoma City, OK	KAUT-TV	19	KFOR-TV	NBC	4	
Oklahoma City, OK	KAUT-TV	19	KOCO-TV	ABC	5	
Oklahoma City, OK	KAUT-TV	19	KOKH-TV	Fox	25	
Oklahoma City, OK	KAUT-TV	19	KOCB		34	
Oklahoma City, OK	KAUT-TV	19	KAUT-TV	The CW	43	
Omaha, NE	KXVO	29	KMTV-TV	CBS	3	
Omaha, NE	KXVO	29	WOWT	NBC	6	
Omaha, NE	KXVO	29	KETV	ABC	7	
Omaha, NE	KXVO	29	KXVO	Roar	15	
Omaha, NE	KXVO	29	KYNE-TV	PBS	26	
Omaha, NE	KXVO	29	KPTM	Fox	42	
Omaha, NE	KXVO	29	T2		42.10	
Omaha, NE	KXVO	29	Pickleball TV		42.11	
Omaha, NE	KXVO	29	GameLoop TV		42.20	
Orlando/Daytona Beach/Melbourne, FL	WESH	11	WESH	NBC	2	
Orlando/Daytona Beach/Melbourne, FL	WESH	11	WKCF	The CW	18	
Orlando/Daytona Beach/Melbourne, FL	WESH	11	WUCF-TV	PBS	24	
Orlando/Daytona Beach/Melbourne, FL	WRBW	28	WKMG-TV	CBS	6	
Orlando/Daytona Beach/Melbourne, FL	WRBW	28	WFTV	ABC	9	
Orlando/Daytona Beach/Melbourne, FL	WRBW	28	WRDQ		27	
Orlando/Daytona Beach/Melbourne, FL	WRBW	28	WOFL	Fox	35	
Orlando/Daytona Beach/Melbourne, FL	WRBW	28	WRBW	MyNetworkTV	65	
Philadelphia, PA	WPSG	33	KYW-TV	CBS	3	
Philadelphia, PA	WPSG	33	WPVI-TV	ABC	6	
Philadelphia, PA	WPSG	33	WCAU	NBC	10	
Philadelphia, PA	WPSG	33	WTXF-TV	Fox	29	
Philadelphia, PA	WPSG	33	WPSG		57	
Philadelphia, PA	WPSG	33	WUVP-DT	Univision	65	
Phoenix, AZ	KASW	27	KPHO-TV	CBS	5	
Phoenix, AZ	KASW	27	KSAZ-TV	Fox	10	
Phoenix, AZ	KASW	27	KPNX	NBC	12	
Phoenix, AZ	KASW	27	KNXV-TV	ABC	15	
Phoenix, AZ	KASW	27	KUTP	Fox	45	
Phoenix, AZ	KASW	27	KASW		61	
Phoenix, AZ	KFPH-CD	35	KTVK		3	
Phoenix, AZ	KFPH-CD	35	KAET	PBS	8	
Phoenix, AZ	KFPH-CD	35	KFPH-DT	Univision	13	
Phoenix, AZ	KFPH-CD	35	KFPH-CD	UniMás	35	
Phoenix, AZ	KFPH-CD	35	KTAZ	Telemundo	39	
Pittsburgh, PA	WPNT	21	WTAE-TV	ABC	4	
Pittsburgh, PA	WPNT	21	WPNT	The CW	22	
Pittsburgh, PA	WPNT	21	WPGH-TV	Fox	53	
Portland, ME	WPFO	17	WMTW	ABC	8	
Portland, ME	WPFO	17	WCBB	PBS	10	
Portland, ME	WPFO	17	WGME-TV	CBS	13	
Portland, ME	WPFO	17	WPFO	Fox	23	
Portland, ME	WPFO	17	WMEA-TV	PBS	26	
Portland, OR	KPDX	30	KGW	NBC	8	
Portland, OR	KPDX	30	KOPB-TV	PBS	10	
Portland, OR	KPDX	30	KPTV	Fox	12	
Portland, OR	KPDX	30	KPDX	MyNetworkTV	49	
Portland, OR	KRCW-TV	33	KATU	ABC	2	
Portland, OR	KRCW-TV	33	T2		2.10	
Portland, OR	KRCW-TV	33	Pickleball TV		2.11	
Portland, OR	KRCW-TV	33	KOIN	CBS	6	
Portland, OR	KRCW-TV	33	KRCW-TV	The CW	32	
Raleigh/Durham/Fayetteville, NC	WRDC	14	WTVD	ABC	11	
Raleigh/Durham/Fayetteville, NC	WRDC	14	WNCN	CBS	17	
Raleigh/Durham/Fayetteville, NC	WRDC	14	WLFL	The CW	22	
Raleigh/Durham/Fayetteville, NC	WRDC	14	WRDC	MyNetworkTV	28	
Raleigh/Durham/Fayetteville, NC	WRDC	14	WUVC-DT	Univision	40	
Raleigh/Durham/Fayetteville, NC	WNGT-CD	23	WUNC-TV	PBS	4	
Raleigh/Durham/Fayetteville, NC	WNGT-CD	23	WRAL-TV	NBC	5	
Raleigh/Durham/Fayetteville, NC	WNGT-CD	23	WNGT-CD	Decades	34	
Raleigh/Durham/Fayetteville, NC	WNGT-CD	23	WRAZ	Fox	50	
Reno, NV	KNSN-TV	20	KTVN	CBS	2	
Reno, NV	KNSN-TV	20	KRNV-DT	NBC	4	
Reno, NV	KNSN-TV	20	KOLO-TV	ABC	8	
Reno, NV	KNSN-TV	20	KRXI-TV	Fox	11	
Reno, NV	KNSN-TV	20	KNSN-TV		21	
Reno, NV	KNSN-TV	20	T2		21.10	
Richmond/Petersburg, VA	WUPV	8	WTVR-TV	CBS	6	
Richmond/Petersburg, VA	WUPV	8	WRIC-TV	ABC	8	
Richmond/Petersburg, VA	WUPV	8	WWBT	NBC	12	
Richmond/Petersburg, VA	WUPV	8	WRLH-TV	Fox	35	
Richmond/Petersburg, VA	WUPV	8	T2		35.10	
Richmond/Petersburg, VA	WUPV	8	Pickleball TV		35.11	
Richmond/Petersburg, VA	WUPV	8	WUPV	The CW	65	
Richmond/Petersburg, VA	WCVW	29	WCVW	PBS	57	
Roanoke/Lynchburg, VA	WZBJ-CD	19	WDBJ	CBS	7	
Roanoke/Lynchburg, VA	WZBJ-CD	19	WSLS-TV	NBC	10	
Roanoke/Lynchburg, VA	WZBJ-CD	19	WSET-TV	ABC	13	
Roanoke/Lynchburg, VA	WZBJ-CD	19	WFXR	Fox	21.2	
Roanoke/Lynchburg, VA	WZBJ-CD	19	WZBJ-CD	MyNetworkTV	24	
Rochester, NY	WUHF	28	WROC-TV	CBS	8	
Rochester, NY	WUHF	28	WHAM-TV	ABC	13	
Rochester, NY	WUHF	28	WXXI-TV	PBS	21	
Rochester, NY	WUHF	28	WUHF	Fox	31	
Rochester, NY	WUHF	28	T2		31.10	
Rochester, NY	WUHF	28	Pickleball TV		31.11	
Sacramento/Stockton/Modesto, CA	KEFM-LD	6				
Sacramento/Stockton/Modesto, CA	KQCA	23	KCRA-TV	NBC	3	
Sacramento/Stockton/Modesto, CA	KQCA	23	KXTV	ABC	10	
Sacramento/Stockton/Modesto, CA	KQCA	23	KOVR	CBS	13	
Sacramento/Stockton/Modesto, CA	KQCA	23	KUVS-DT	Univision	19	
Sacramento/Stockton/Modesto, CA	KQCA	23	KTXL	Fox	40	
Sacramento/Stockton/Modesto, CA	KQCA	23	KQCA	MyNetworkTV	58	
Salem, IN/Louisville, KY	WBKI	58	WAVE	NBC	3	
Salem, IN/Louisville, KY	WBKI	58	WHAS-TV	ABC	11	
Salem, IN/Louisville, KY	WBKI	58	WBNA		21	
Salem, IN/Louisville, KY	WBKI	58	WLKY	CBS	32	
Salem, IN/Louisville, KY	WBKI	58	WDRB	Fox	41	
Salem, IN/Louisville, KY	WBKI	58	WBKI	The CW	58	
Salem, IN/Louisville, KY	WKMJ-TV	34	WKPC-TV	PBS Encore	68.1	
Salem, IN/Louisville, KY	WKMJ-TV	34	WKPC-TV	Kentucky Channel	68.2	
Salem, IN/Louisville, KY	WKMJ-TV	34	WKPC-TV	World	68.3	
Salt Lake City, UT	KJZZ-TV	19	KUTV	CBS	2	
Salt Lake City, UT	KJZZ-TV	19	KTVX	ABC	4	
Salt Lake City, UT	KJZZ-TV	19	KJZZ-TV		14	
Salt Lake City, UT	KJZZ-TV	19	KUCW	The CW	30	
San Antonio, TX	KSAT-TV	12				
San Antonio, TX	KSAT-TV	12	KENS	CBS	5	
San Antonio, TX	KSAT-TV	12	KLRN	PBS	9	
San Antonio, TX	KSAT-TV	12	KSAT-TV	ABC	12	
San Antonio, TX	KSAT-TV	12	KWEX-DT	Univision	41	
San Antonio, TX	KSAT-TV	12	KVDA	Telemundo	60	
San Antonio, TX	KMYS	32	KCWX	MyNetworkTV	2	
San Antonio, TX	KMYS	32	WOAI-TV	NBC	4	
San Antonio, TX	KMYS	32	KABB	Fox	29	
San Antonio, TX	KMYS	32	T2		29.10	
San Antonio, TX	KMYS	32	Pickleball TV		29.11	
San Antonio, TX	KMYS	32	KMYS	Dabl	35	
San Diego, CA	KRPE-LD	6		KFMB-DT2	23	
San Diego, CA	KUSI-TV	18	KUSI-TV		51	
San Diego, CA	KUSI-TV	18	KSWB-TV	Fox	69	
San Francisco/Oakland/San Jose, CA	KRON-TV	7	KTVU	Fox	2	
San Francisco/Oakland/San Jose, CA	KRON-TV	7	KRON-TV	The CW	4	
San Francisco/Oakland/San Jose, CA	KRON-TV	7	KPIX-TV	CBS	5	
San Francisco/Oakland/San Jose, CA	KRON-TV	7	KGO-TV	ABC	7	
San Francisco/Oakland/San Jose, CA	KRON-TV	7	KNTV	NBC	11	
San Francisco/Oakland/San Jose, CA	KRON-TV	7	KDTV-DT	Univision	14	
San Francisco/Oakland/San Jose, CA	KBKF-LD	6	KBKF-LD		6	
San Francisco/Oakland/San Jose, CA	KBKF-LD	6	KBKF-LD	U Channel	6.2	
Santa Barbara/Santa Maria/San Luis Obispo, CA	KSBB-CD	17	KSBB-CD	MyNetworkTV/News	17	
Santa Barbara/Santa Maria/San Luis Obispo, CA	KSBB-CD	17	KSBB-CD	News	17.2	
Savannah, GA	W29EN-D	29	WJWJ-TV	PBS	16	
Savannah, GA	W29EN-D	29	WJWJ-TV	PBS Encore	16.2	
Savannah, GA	W29EN-D	29	WJWJ-TV	Create	16.3	
Savannah, GA	W29EN-D	29	WJWJ-TV	World	16.4	
Savannah, GA	W29EN-D	29	WJWJ-TV	PBS Kids	16.5	
Seattle/Tacoma, WA	KUNS-TV	24	KOMO-TV	ABC	4	
Seattle/Tacoma, WA	KUNS-TV	24	T2		4.10	
Seattle/Tacoma, WA	KUNS-TV	24	Pickleball TV		4.11	
Seattle/Tacoma, WA	KUNS-TV	24	KIRO-TV	CBS	7	
Seattle/Tacoma, WA	KUNS-TV	24	KUNS-TV	The CW	51	
Seattle/Tacoma, WA	KONG	31	KING-TV	NBC	5	
Seattle/Tacoma, WA	KONG	31	KCPQ	Fox	13	
Seattle/Tacoma, WA	KONG	31	KONG		16	
Seattle/Tacoma, WA	KONG	31	KZJO	MyNetworkTV	22	
Shreveport, LA	KSHV-TV	16	KTAL-TV	NBC	6	
Shreveport, LA	KSHV-TV	16	KSLA	CBS	12	
Shreveport, LA	KSHV-TV	16	KMSS-TV	Fox	33	
Shreveport, LA	KSHV-TV	16	KSHV-TV	MyNetworkTV	45	
Shreveport, LA	KPXJ	32	KTBS-TV	ABC	3	
Shreveport, LA	KPXJ	32	KTBS-TV	Weather	3.2	
Shreveport, LA	KPXJ	32	KTBS-TV	News	3.3	
Shreveport, LA	KPXJ	32	KPXJ	The CW	21	
South Bend, IN	WSJV	30	WNDU-TV	NBC	16	
South Bend, IN	WSJV	30	WSBT-TV	CBS	22	
South Bend, IN	WSJV	30	WSBT-TV	Fox	22.2	
South Bend, IN	WSJV	30	WSJV	H&I	28.1	
South Bend, IN	WSJV	30	WNIT	PBS	34	
South Bend, IN	WSJV	30	WHME-TV	Univision	46	
Springfield/Decatur/Urbana/Champaign, IL	WRSP-TV	55	WAND	NBC	17	
Springfield/Decatur/Urbana/Champaign, IL	WRSP-TV	55	WICS	ABC	20	
Springfield/Decatur/Urbana/Champaign, IL	WRSP-TV	55	T2		20.10	
Springfield/Decatur/Urbana/Champaign, IL	WRSP-TV	55	Pickleball TV		20.11	
Springfield/Decatur/Urbana/Champaign, IL	WRSP-TV	55	WCIX	MyNetworkTV	49	
Springfield/Decatur/Urbana/Champaign, IL	WRSP-TV	55	WRSP-TV	Fox	55	
Springfield/Decatur/Urbana/Champaign, IL	WCCU	27	WCIA	CBS	3	
Springfield/Decatur/Urbana/Champaign, IL	WCCU	27	WICD	ABC	15	
Springfield/Decatur/Urbana/Champaign, IL	WCCU	27	T2		15.10	
Springfield/Decatur/Urbana/Champaign, IL	WCCU	27	Pickleball TV		15.11	
Springfield/Decatur/Urbana/Champaign, IL	WCCU	27	WBUI	The CW	23	
Springfield/Decatur/Urbana/Champaign, IL	WCCU	27	WCCU	Fox	27	
Springfield, MO	KOZL-TV	28	KYTV	NBC	3	
Springfield, MO	KOZL-TV	28	KOLR	CBS	10	
Springfield, MO	KOZL-TV	28	KOZL-TV	MyNetworkTV	27	
Springfield, MO	KOZL-TV	28	KSPR-LD	ABC	33	
Springfield, MO	KOZL-TV	28	KRBK	Fox	49	
Springfield/Holyoke, MA	WFXQ-CD	21	WFXQ-CD	NBC	28	
Springfield/Holyoke, MA	WFXQ-CD	21	WFXQ-CD	The CW Plus	28.2	
St. Louis, MO	KPLR-TV	26	KTVI	Fox	2	
St. Louis, MO	KPLR-TV	26	KMOV	CBS	4	
St. Louis, MO	KPLR-TV	26	KSDK	NBC	5	
St. Louis, MO	KPLR-TV	26	KPLR-TV	The CW	11	
St. Louis, MO	KPLR-TV	26	KDNL-TV	ABC	30	
St. Louis, MO	KPLR-TV	26	T2		30.10	
Syracuse, NY	WSTM-TV	19	WSTM-TV	NBC	3	
Syracuse, NY	WSTM-TV	19	WTVH	CBS	5	
Syracuse, NY	WSTM-TV	19	WSYR-TV	ABC	9	
Syracuse, NY	WVOA-LD	6				
Tallahassee, FL/Thomasville, GA	WNXG-LD	33	WCTV	CBS	38	
Tallahassee, FL/Thomasville, GA	WNXG-LD	33	WCTV-DT2	MeTV	38.2	
Tallahassee, FL/Thomasville, GA	WNXG-LD	33	WCTV-DT3	365BLK	38.3	
Tallahassee, FL/Thomasville, GA	WNXG-LD	33	WCTV-DT4	Ion	38.4	
Tallahassee, FL/Thomasville, GA	WNXG-LD	33	WCTV-DT5	True Crime Network	38.5	
Tampa/St. Petersburg/Sarasota, FL	WMOR-TV	18	WFLA-TV	NBC	8	
Tampa/St. Petersburg/Sarasota, FL	WMOR-TV	18	WTSP	CBS	10	
Tampa/St. Petersburg/Sarasota, FL	WMOR-TV	18	WTVT	Fox	13	
Tampa/St. Petersburg/Sarasota, FL	WMOR-TV	18	WFTS-TV	ABC	28	
Tampa/St. Petersburg/Sarasota, FL	WMOR-TV	18	WMOR-TV		32	
Tucson, AZ	KHRR	16	KVOA	NBC	4	
Tucson, AZ	KHRR	16	KUAT-TV	PBS	6	
Tucson, AZ	KHRR	16	KGUN-TV	ABC	9	
Tucson, AZ	KHRR	16	KMSB	Fox	11	
Tucson, AZ	KHRR	16	KOLD-TV	CBS	13	
Tucson, AZ	KHRR	16	KHRR	Telemundo	40	
Waco/Temple/Bryan, TX	KNXG-LD	27	KNXG-LD	CBS	27	
Waco/Temple/Bryan, TX	KNXG-LD	27	KNXG-LD	The CW	27.2	
Waco/Temple/Bryan, TX	KNXG-LD	27	KNXG-LD	Telemundo	27.3	
Washington, D.C./Hagerstown, MD	WDCN-LD	6	WDCN-LD	The Country Network	6	
Washington, D.C./Hagerstown, MD	WIAV-CD	30	WIAV-CD	Roar	58	
Washington, D.C./Hagerstown, MD	WIAV-CD	30	WIAV-CD	Roar	58.3	
Washington, D.C./Hagerstown, MD	WIAV-CD	30	WIAV-CD	News	58.4	
Washington, D.C./Hagerstown, MD	WHUT-TV	33	WRC-TV	NBC	4	
Washington, D.C./Hagerstown, MD	WHUT-TV	33	WTTG	Fox	5	
Washington, D.C./Hagerstown, MD	WHUT-TV	33	WJLA-TV	ABC	7	
Washington, D.C./Hagerstown, MD	WHUT-TV	33	T2		7.10	
Washington, D.C./Hagerstown, MD	WHUT-TV	33	Pickleball TV		7.11	
Washington, D.C./Hagerstown, MD	WHUT-TV	33	WUSA	CBS	9	
Washington, D.C./Hagerstown, MD	WHUT-TV	33	WHUT-TV	PBS	32	
West Palm Beach/Fort Pierce, FL	WWHB-CD	33	WPTV-TV	NBC	5	
West Palm Beach/Fort Pierce, FL	WWHB-CD	33	WPEC	CBS	12	
West Palm Beach/Fort Pierce, FL	WWHB-CD	33	T2		12.10	
West Palm Beach/Fort Pierce, FL	WWHB-CD	33	Pickleball TV		12.11	
West Palm Beach/Fort Pierce, FL	WWHB-CD	33	WPBF	ABC	25	
West Palm Beach/Fort Pierce, FL	WWHB-CD	33	WFLX	Fox	29	
West Palm Beach/Fort Pierce, FL	WWHB-CD	33	WWHB-CD	Roar	48	
Wichita/Hutchinson, KS	KSCW-DT	12	KPTS	PBS	8	
Wichita/Hutchinson, KS	KSCW-DT	12	KWCH-DT	CBS	12	
Wichita/Hutchinson, KS	KSCW-DT	12	KSCW-DT	The CW	33	
Wichita/Hutchinson, KS	KMTW	35	KSNW	NBC	3	
Wichita/Hutchinson, KS	KMTW	35	KAKE	ABC	10	
Wichita/Hutchinson, KS	KMTW	35	KSAS-TV	Fox	24	
Wichita/Hutchinson, KS	KMTW	35	KMTW	Dabl	36	
Wilmington, NC	W30ER-D	30	WILM-LD		10	
