= Channel 6 low-power TV stations in the United States =

The following low-power television stations broadcast on digital or analog channel 6 in the United States:

- K06AA-D in Broadus, Montana
- K06AE-D in Prescott, Arizona
- K06AV-D in Wolf Point, Montana
- K06DM-D in Panaca, Nevada
- K06FE-D in Miles City, Montana
- K06GW-D in New Castle, Colorado
- K06HN-D in Gunnison, Colorado
- K06HT-D in Ely, Nevada
- K06HZ-D in Paonia, Colorado
- K06IQ-D in Newberry Springs, California
- K06JA-D in Cedar Canyon, Utah
- K06JC-D in Chadron, Nebraska
- K06KA-D in Fort Jones, etc., California
- K06KQ-D in Manhattan, Nevada
- K06KR-D in Crawford, Nebraska
- K06MK-D in Elko, Nevada
- K06NS-D in Chiloquin, Oregon
- K06NT-D in Dolores, Colorado
- K06NV-D in White Sulphur Springs, Montana
- K06NY-D in Ryndon, Nevada
- K06PG-D in Laughlin, Nevada
- K06PT-D in Columbia, Missouri
- K06PU-D in Yakima, Washington
- K06QA-D in Odessa, Texas
- K06QD-D in Pasco, Washington
- K06QF-D in Heron, Montana
- K06QI-D in Alamogordo, New Mexico
- K06QJ-D in Sioux Falls, South Dakota
- K06QL-D in Modesto, California
- K06QN-D in Judith Gap, Montana
- K06QP-D in Juneau, Alaska
- K06QR-D in Eugene, Oregon
- K06QS-D in Salina & Redmond, Utah
- K06QW-D in Sentinel, Arizona
- K06QX-D in Reno, Nevada
- K12RF-D in Healy, etc., Alaska
- KBFW-LD in Arlington, Texas
- KBKF-LD in San Jose, California, an ATSC 3.0 station
- KCVH-LD in Houston, Texas
- KEFM-LD in Sacramento, California, an ATSC 3.0 station
- KFMY-LD in Petaluma, California
- KGHD-LD in Las Vegas, Nevada
- KJDN-LD in Logan, Utah
- KMCF-LD in Visalia, California
- KNIK-LD in Anchorage, Alaska
- KNXT-LD in Bakersfield, California
- KPWC-LD in Tillamook, Oregon
- KRPE-LD in San Diego, California
- KTVJ-LD in Nampa, Idaho
- KWFT-LD in Fort Smith, Arkansas
- KXDP-LD in Denver, Colorado, an ATSC 3.0 station
- KXKW-LP in Lafayette, Louisiana
- KYMU-LD in Seattle, Washington
- KZFW-LD in Dallas, Texas
- KZNO-LD in Big Bear Lake, California, an ATSC 3.0 station
- W06AJ-D in Franklin, etc., North Carolina
- W06DA-D in Aguada, Puerto Rico
- W06DG-D in Evansville, Indiana
- W06DI-D in Jasper, Florida
- W06DK-D in Florence, South Carolina
- WATV-LD in Orlando, Florida
- WDCN-LD in Fairfax, Virginia, an ATSC 3.0 station
- WDHC-LD in Dickson–Nashville, Tennessee
- WDMY-LD in Toledo, Ohio
- WEYS-LD in Miami, Florida, an ATSC 3.0 station
- WFIB-LD in Key West, Florida
- WHDY-LP in Panama City, Florida
- WJMF-LD in Jackson, Mississippi
- WMTO-LD in Norfolk, Virginia, an ATSC 3.0 station
- WNDR-LP in Auburn, New York
- WNYZ-LP in New York, New York
- WPGF-LP in Memphis, Tennessee
- WRME-LD in Chicago, Illinois, an ATSC 3.0 station
- WTBS-LD in Atlanta, Georgia, an ATSC 3.0 station
- WVCC-LD in Westmoreland, New Hampshire
- WVOA-LD in Westvale, New York
- WWXY-LD in San Juan, Puerto Rico

The following low-power stations, which are no longer licensed, formerly broadcast on digital or analog channel 6:

- K06BI in Manitou Springs, Colorado
- K06BN in Wagon Mound, New Mexico
- K06BQ in Richfield, etc., Utah
- K06BS in Loa, etc., Utah
- K06CT in Orovada, Nevada
- K06DR in Spring Glen, etc., Utah
- K06EB in Brusett, etc., Montana
- K06EX in Lewiston, California
- K06EY in Broken Bow, Nebraska
- K06FA in Hopland, California
- K06FD in La Barge, etc., Wyoming
- K06FL in Fish Lake Resort, Utah
- K06FM in Long Valley Junction, Utah
- K06FT in Penasco, New Mexico
- K06HF in Salida, etc., Colorado
- K06HU-D in Aspen, Colorado
- K06HX in Mora, New Mexico
- K06IG in Koosharem, Utah
- K06IM in Henefer, etc., Utah
- K06IO in Scottsburg, Oregon
- K06JF in Cortez, Colorado
- K06JK in Dayton, Nevada
- K06JH in Wanship, Utah
- K06JM in Gillette, Wyoming
- K06JN in Severance Ranch, etc., Oregon
- K06JU in Howard, Montana
- K06JX in Manley Hot Springs, Alaska
- K06KC in Yerington, Nevada
- K06KJ in Collbran, Colorado
- K06KO-D in Kanarraville, etc., Utah
- K06LG-D in Chuathbaluk, Alaska
- K06LI in Chemult, Oregon
- K06LK in Clarks Point, etc., Alaska
- K06LP in Circle Hot Springs, Alaska
- K06LX in Glenwood Springs, Colorado
- K06MF in Kenai, etc., Alaska
- K06MM in Bluff, Utah
- K06NG-D in Sargents, Colorado
- K06NI in The Dalles, Oregon
- K06NK in Mexican Hat, Utah
- K06NZ in Gabbs, Nevada
- K06OV in Peoa and Oakley, Utah
- K06OY in Baker Flats, etc., Washington
- K06QG-D in Sioux City, Iowa
- K06QO-D in Martinsdale, Montana
- KBEX-LP in Amarillo, Texas
- KBOP-LD in Dallas, Texas
- KCIO-LP in Victorville, California
- KESU-LP in Hanamaulu, Hawaii
- KFLZ-LD in San Antonio, Texas
- KFMP-LP in Lubbock, Texas
- KIPS-LD in Beaumont, Texas
- KJIV-LP in Lake City, etc., California
- KLOA-LP in Inyokern, etc., California
- KNNN-LP in Redding, California
- KPOM-LP in Indio, California
- KRGT-LP in Rio Grande City, Texas
- KSHW-LP in Sheridan, Wyoming
- KUHD-LD in Camarillo, California
- W06AD in Spruce Pine, North Carolina
- W06AE in Clayton, etc., Georgia
- W06AL in Oteen, etc., North Carolina
- W06AP in Maggie Valley, etc., North Carolina
- W06AQ in Bat Cave, etc., North Carolina
- W06BD in Princeton, Indiana
- W06BH in Phenix City, etc., Alabama
- WBPA-LD in Weirton, West Virginia
- WDDA-LP in Dalton, Georgia
- WMYH-LP in Elmira, New York
- WRTN-LP in Alexandria, Tennessee
- WXXW-LP in Binghamton, New York

== Potential full shutdown ==
The FCC required all analog (NTSC) transmissions on Channel 6 to cease by July 13, 2021.
