= Channel 6 digital TV stations in the United States =

The following television stations broadcast on digital channel 6 in the United States:

- K06AA-D in Broadus, Montana, on virtual channel 8, which rebroadcasts KULR-TV
- K06AE-D in Prescott, Arizona, on virtual channel 2, which rebroadcasts KNAZ-TV
- K06AV-D in Wolf Point, Montana, on virtual channel 20, which rebroadcasts K20JS-D
- K06DM-D in Panaca, Nevada, on virtual channel 8, which rebroadcasts KLAS-TV
- K06FE-D in Miles City, Montana, on virtual channel 8, which rebroadcasts KULR-TV
- K06GW-D in New Castle, Colorado, on virtual channel 18, which rebroadcasts KRMJ
- K06HN-D in Gunnison, Colorado, on virtual channel 8
- K06HT-D in Ely, Nevada, on virtual channel 5, which rebroadcasts KVVU-TV
- K06HZ-D in Paonia, Colorado
- K06IQ-D in Newberry Springs, California, on virtual channel 11, which rebroadcasts KTTV
- K06JA-D in Cedar Canyon, Utah, on virtual channel 4, which rebroadcasts KTVX
- K06JC-D in Chadron, Nebraska, on virtual channel 13, which rebroadcasts KTNE-TV
- K06KA-D in Fort Jones, etc., California, on virtual channel 10, which rebroadcasts KTVL
- K06KQ-D in Manhattan, Nevada, on virtual channel 11, which rebroadcasts KRXI-TV
- K06KR-D in Crawford, Nebraska, on virtual channel 13, which rebroadcasts KTNE-TV
- K06MK-D in Elko, Nevada, on virtual channel 2, which rebroadcasts KTVN
- K06NS-D in Chiloquin, Oregon, on virtual channel 2, which rebroadcasts KOTI
- K06NT-D in Dolores, Colorado, on virtual channel 6
- K06NV-D in White Sulphur Springs, Montana, on virtual channel 4, which rebroadcasts KHMT
- K06NY-D in Ryndon, Nevada, on virtual channel 2, which rebroadcasts KTVN
- K06PG-D in Laughlin, Nevada, on virtual channel 10, which rebroadcasts KLVX
- K06PT-D in Columbia, Missouri
- K06PU-D in Yakima, Washington
- K06QA-D in Odessa, Texas
- K06QD-D in Pasco, Washington
- K06QF-D in Heron, Montana, on virtual channel 4, which rebroadcasts KXLY-TV
- K06QI-D in Alamogordo, New Mexico
- K06QJ-D in Sioux Falls, South Dakota
- K06QL-D in Modesto, California
- K06QN-D in Judith Gap, Montana, on virtual channel 2, which rebroadcasts KTVQ
- K06QP-D in Juneau, Alaska, on virtual channel 6
- K06QR-D in Eugene, Oregon
- K06QS-D in Salina & Redmond, Utah, on virtual channel 14, which rebroadcasts KJZZ-TV
- K06QW-D in Sentinel, Arizona
- K06QX-D in Reno, Nevada
- KBFW-LD in Arlington, Texas
- KBSD-DT in Ensign, Kansas, on virtual channel 6
- KBKF-LD in San Jose, California, an ATSC 3.0 station, on virtual channel 6
- KCVH-LD in Houston, Texas, on virtual channel 6
- KEFM-LD in Sacramento, California, an ATSC 3.0 station, on virtual channel 9
- KFLZ-LD in San Antonio, Texas
- KFMY-LD in Petaluma, California, on virtual channel 6
- KJDN-LD in Logan, Utah
- KMCF-LD in Visalia, California
- KNIK-LD in Anchorage, Alaska
- KNXT-LD in Bakersfield, California
- KPWC-LD in Tillamook, Oregon
- KRPE-LD in San Diego, California
- KTVJ-LD in Nampa, Idaho
- KTVM-TV in Butte, Montana, on virtual channel 6, which will move to channel 20
- KWFT-LD in Fort Smith, Arkansas, on virtual channel 6
- KWNB-TV in Hayes Center, Nebraska, on virtual channel 6
- KXDP-LD in Denver, Colorado, an ATSC 3.0 station, on virtual channel 18
- KYMU-LD in Seattle, Washington, on virtual channel 6
- KZFW-LD in Dallas, Texas
- KZNO-LD in Big Bear Lake, California, an ATSC 3.0 station, on virtual channel 6
- W06AJ-D in Franklin, etc., North Carolina, on virtual channel 4, which rebroadcasts WYFF
- W06DA-D in Aguada, Puerto Rico, on virtual channel 6
- W06DG-D in Evansville, Indiana
- W06DI-D in Jasper, Florida
- W06DK-D in Florence, South Carolina
- WABW-TV in Pelham, Georgia, on virtual channel 14
- WATV-LD in Orlando, Florida, on virtual channel 47
- WDMY-LD in Toledo, Ohio
- WCES-TV in Wrens, Georgia, on virtual channel 20
- WDCN-LD in Fairfax, Virginia, an ATSC 3.0 station, on virtual channel 6
- WDHC-LD in Dickson–Nashville, Tennessee
- WEYS-LD in Miami, Florida, an ATSC 3.0 station, on virtual channel 54
- WFIB-LD in Key West, Florida, on virtual channel 6
- WJMF-LD in Jackson, Mississippi
- WKBS-TV in Altoona, Pennsylvania, on virtual channel 47
- WMTO-LD in Norfolk, Virginia, an ATSC 3.0 station.
- WOUC-TV in Cambridge, Ohio, on virtual channel 44
- WPVI-TV in Philadelphia, Pennsylvania, on virtual channel 6
- WRME-LD in Chicago, Illinois, an ATSC 3.0 station, on virtual channel 33
- WTBS-LD in Atlanta, Georgia, an ATSC 3.0 station, on virtual channel 6
- WVCC-LD in Westmoreland, New Hampshire
- WVOA-LD in Westvale, New York
- WVUA in Tuscaloosa, Alabama, on virtual channel 23
- WWXY-LD in San Juan, Puerto Rico, to move to channel 2, on virtual channel 38

The following stations, which are no longer licensed, formerly broadcast on digital channel 6:

- K06HU-D in Aspen, Colorado
- K06KO-D in Kanarraville, etc., Utah
- K06LG-D in Chuathbaluk, Alaska
- K06NG-D in Sargents, Colorado
- K06OQ-D in Thomasville, Colorado
- K06OR-D in Seward, Alaska
- K06QG-D in Sioux City, Iowa
- K06QO-D in Martinsdale, Montana
- K06QQ-D in Superior, Montana
- KBOP-LD in Dallas, Texas
- KEFM-LD in Sacramento, California
- KIPS-LD in Beaumont, Texas
- KNNN-LD in Redding, California
- KUHD-LD in Camarillo, California
- KZFQ-LD in Royse City, Texas
- W06CM-D in Atlanta, Georgia
- WBPA-LD in Weirton, West Virginia
