= Channel 6 radio stations in the United States =

U.S Low Power TV stations that also operate as FM radio stations

This is a review of low-power television stations (LPTV) in the United States, transmitting on VHF channel 6, which also operate as radio stations capable of being picked up by many standard FM receivers. These stations are colloquially known as Franken-FMs, a reference to Frankenstein's monster, because TV stations functioning as radio stations had not been envisioned by the Federal Communications Commission (FCC). The FCC commonly refers to these stations as FM6 operations. All of these FM transmissions are authorized for operation on a center frequency of 87.75 MHz, generally designated by receiver and station marketing as "87.7 FM".

First devised in 2002, until July 14, 2021, most of these stations employed the original NTSC-M analog TV transmission standard. However, as of that date, the FCC required that all TV stations that had not received a waiver had to cease analog transmissions, which meant that only the stations using a modified version of the ATSC 3.0 "NextGen TV" digital standard could still be received by standard FM radios.

On July 20, 2023, an FCC "Report and Order" restricted these operations to only the 13 stations holding Special Temporary Authority (STA) grants as of that date, with no additional authorizations permitted other than WVOA-LD in Westvale, New York, which began FM6 transmissions on December 15, 2023.

== List of FM6 stations currently authorized using a modified ATSC 3.0 standard ==
The following channel 6 LPTV stations have been authorized to offer FM6 service, a version of the ATSC 3.0 digital TV standard that includes an FM analog signal receivable on standard radios at 87.75 FM.

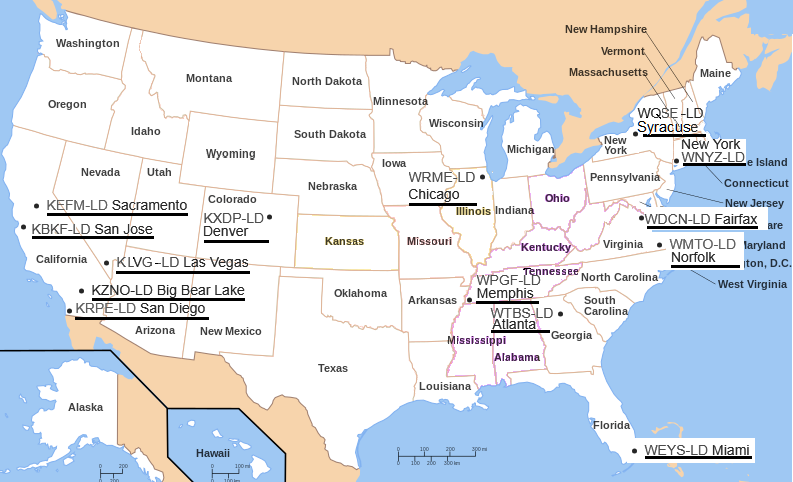
Map of the 14 US Low Power TV (LPTV) stations transmitting on TV channel 6, which are also authorized to transmit an FM signal at 87.7 MHz

California

- KZNO-LD Big Bear Lake
- KRPE-LD San Diego
- KBKF-LD San Jose
- KEFM-LD Sacramento

Colorado

- KXDP-LD Denver

Florida

- WEYS-LD Miami

Georgia

- WTBS-LD Atlanta

Illinois

- WRME-LD Chicago

Nevada

- KLVG-LD Las Vegas

New York

- WNYZ-LD New York City
- WQSE-LD Syracuse

Tennessee

- WPGF-LD Memphis

Virginia

- WDCN-LD Fairfax
- WMTO-LD Norfolk (simulcast on WXTG-FM)

== Background ==
These stations transmit an analog FM signal centered on 87.75 MHz, designated by receiver and station marketing as "87.7 FM". This is just below the lowest FM band frequency of 87.9 MHz, and within the internationally recognized Band II, which extends down to 87.5 MHz and is thus receivable by most consumer radios. Although primarily functioning as radio stations, they are formally licensed as TV stations, thus are still required to provide some sort of video signal in order to comply with FCC regulations. However the type of TV programming is not specified, and low-power TV stations are exempt from educational and informational programming mandates and are thus — unlike full-power and Class A TV stations — not required to provide three hours of educational children's programming per week.

The existence of largely unregulated commercial radio stations on 87.7 MHz, adjacent to the 87.9 to 91.9 FM frequencies (channels 200-220) reserved for non-commercial operations, led to requests that the FCC either eliminate, or formally regulate, these stations. In an October 2014 review, the FCC requested comments on "whether to allow LPTV stations on digital television channel 6 (82-88 MHz) to operate analog FM radio-type services on an ancillary or supplementary basis pursuant to section 73.624(c) of the rules". In 2015, the commission further stated that: "We intend to issue a decision on whether to permit digital LPTV stations to operate analog FM radio type services on an ancillary or supplementary basis at a later date." On December 4, 2019, the FCC issued a Public Notice that solicited additional public comments, in preparation for the July 13, 2021, deadline for all LPTV stations to switch from analog to digital transmissions. However, the commission never made a formal decision about the status of these stations.

On May 17, 2022, Jessica Rosenworcel, head FCC commissioner, announced that one of the agenda items for an upcoming FCC Open Meeting, "Preserving Local Radio Programming (MB Docket No. 03-185)", "will consider a proposal to allow these broadcasters to continue their existing FM6 radio service, provided that they meet certain conditions, including interference protection and the provision of a synchronous TV service to consumers." However, this agenda item was dropped as being no longer needed, due to the June 6, 2022, adoption of a "Fifth Notice of Proposed Rulemaking" for MB Docket No. 03-185, which requested additional public comments about the best use of the frequencies assigned to TV channel 6.

On July 20, 2023, the FCC's 5th "Report and Order" was unanimously adopted, establishing a grandfather clause for the thirteen stations currently holding special temporary authority (STA) grants to operate audio on 87.75 MHz, and, for the first time, formally defining regulatory standards for these stations. The regulations included:

- All FM6 operations are required to transmit on a center frequency of 87.75 MHz, with operation at 87.7 MHz explicitly prohibited.
- No additional FM6 operations will be granted. (WVOA-LD in Westvale, New York, was granted an extension, because its proximity to the Canadian border resulted in delays due to the need to coordinate with the Canadian Radio-television and Telecommunications Commission. This station launched its FM6 service in December 2023.)
- If an existing FM6 service discontinues analog audio, it will not be allowed to resume.
- Because they are formally defined as an "ancillary or supplementary" service, commercial FM6 broadcasts are subject to the five percent fee on the gross revenue of such services and must submit an Annual DTV Ancillary/Supplementary Services Report.
- Due to their status as de facto radio stations, the FM6 operations are subject to the same emergency alert and online public file requirements as standard radio stations.
- The FM6 broadcast operations will not be licensed, or transferable, separately from the parent LPTV station license.
- In addition to the FM6 signal, as LPTV stations they have to provide at least one separate, and free, over-the-air TV broadcast.
- The FM6 signal coverage is limited to no more than the range of the TV signal. (LPTV stations operating on VHF TV channels, which includes channel 6, are licensed for an Effective Radiated Power (ERP) of no more than 3 kilowatts). This requirement was "to ensure that the FM6 LPTV station did not prioritize its FM operations over its television operations", moreover, the FCC regulators "will use the term 'service contour' to describe the FM6 station's coverage area and 'protected contour' to describe the TV station's coverage area".

== History ==
=== Analog TV transmissions ===
Under the original NTSC-M analog standards, a TV station's audio and video components are broadcast separately, with the audio transmitted as an FM signal. In 1945, TV channel 6 was assigned use of 82-88 MHz, with the channel's audio located at a center frequency of 87.75 MHz. That same year, the standard FM broadcasting band was reassigned to 80 channels from 88.1 to 105.9 MHz, which was soon expanded to 100 channels ending at 107.9 MHz (channels 201–300). One additional FM channel, centered on 87.9 MHz (channel 200), was added in 1978.

The location of TV channel 6's audio just below the FM band meant that many consumer FM radios could readily pick up the sound from channel 6 stations. Full-power stations sometimes promoted this as a valuable feature for commuters and in emergency situations, although the primary audience remained TV viewers. A few specialty "TV Sound" receivers were sold that could pick up audio from the VHF band TV stations, which were sometimes marketed to office workers who wanted to listen to their favorite daytime TV programs. Also, some Japanese and Soviet receivers could tune further down the VHF low band, making it possible to receive audio from VHF channel 5 at 81.75 MHz using Japanese band receivers that tuned to 76 MHz, while Soviet OIRT band receivers included audio reception of VHF channels 4 (71.75 MHz) and 3 (65.75 MHz).

In 1982, licensing began of a new classification of "Low Power Television" stations (LPTV). Eventually, a small number of channel 6 LPTV stations determined it was more profitable to operate as de facto radio stations, although this had not been anticipated by the FCC. On August 1, 2002, KZND-LP, a channel 6 LPTV station in Anchorage, Alaska, began promoting itself as a musical format radio station on 87.7 MHz. Competing local conventional radio stations quickly challenged this as a misuse of a TV station authorization, but the FCC determined that as long as the station transmitted sufficient visual features, which did not have to be coordinated with the sound, it was in compliance with regulations. Moreover, as a TV station it was exempt from having to follow any radio station rules. In early 2008, Monitoring Times magazine reported the existence of three channel 6 de facto radio stations in addition to KZND: KSFV-LP in Los Angeles; K06NC in Kauai, Hawaii; and WNYZ-LP in New York City. A Radio World review later that year identified a total of 8 ongoing examples. In late 2019, InsideRadio identified 28 active stations.

While operating using analog transmissions, television video commonly consisted of minimal offerings, such as still frames, test patterns, automated weather conditions and news, or silent films. Audio for both television and FM reception was identical. (TV signals potentially could have carried separate audio through their Second audio program (SAP) feeds, although none did so as of 2019.) With the mandatory 2009 digital television transition in the United States, full power TV stations were required to switch from analog to ATSC 1.0 digital transmissions. This meant that their audio could no longer be picked up by FM radios, as the ATSC 1.0 format is incompatible with both FM's analog and digital in-band on-channel HD Radio standards.

==== LPTV stations that transmitted FM radio programming using the analog standard prior to July 14, 2021 ====
The following channel 6 low power TV stations previously included radio-style programming on an FM analog signal centered on 87.75 MHz when broadcasting using the NTSC-M analog TV standard:

Alaska

- KNIK-LP Anchorage

California

- KLOA-LP Antelope Valley
- KZNO-LP Big Bear Lake
- KNNN-LP Redding
- KRPE-LP San Diego
- KBKF-LP San Jose (switched to digital in February 2021)
- KUHD-LP Ventura

Colorado

- KXDP-LP Denver

Florida

- WEYS-LP Miami

Georgia

- WTBS-LP Atlanta

Illinois

- WRME-LP Chicago

Louisiana

- KXKW-LP Lafayette

Maryland

- WOWZ-LP Salisbury

Mississippi

- WJMF-LP Jackson

Nevada

- KGHD-LP Las Vegas

New York

- WXXW-LP Binghamton
- WVOA-LP Westvale (Syracuse market)

Texas

- KIPS-LP in Beaumont
- KZFW-LP Dallas
- KJIB-LP Houston
  - KJIB broadcast audio on 87.89 MHz because of interference from other channel 6 low-power stations. The station was licensed only to channel 5, and its license surrendered in 2014, but a local church has tried to modify the terms of license to allow its operation. The FCC in 2018 submitted a Notice of Unlicensed Operation to the station.
- KFLZ-LP San Antonio

Virginia

- WDCN-LP Fairfax
- WMTO-LP Norfolk (simulcast on WXTG-FM)

Wyoming

- KSHW-LP Sheridan

=== Digital TV transmissions ===
Attempts to have analog FM signals coexist with the original ATSC 1.0 digital standards proved unsuccessful. In 2009, WRGB, a full-power channel 6 station in Schenectady, New York, was ordered by the FCC to cease experimentation. In 2012, Venture Technologies Group, which owns several channel 6 low power TV stations in major markets, applied to install modified versions of the ATSC 1.0 standard in order to add an FM signal for channel 6 LPTV stations KFMP-LP in Lubbock, Texas, and WBPA-LP in Pittsburgh, Pennsylvania. However, the FCC denied this request, stating that, among other deficiencies, this "proposal is likely to increase the interference potential to co-channel DTV operations".

A newer, and currently optional, digital TV transmission standard, "NextGen TV" ATSC 3.0, was determined to have more potential, and Venture Technologies developed a revised approach for allowing an analog FM audio subcarrier to coexist with an ATSC 3.0 digital TV signal. The company cited the FCC rules, which provides that "DTV broadcast stations are permitted to offer services of any nature, consistent with the public interest, convenience, and necessity, on an ancillary or supplementary basis", and in general affords broadcasters broad permission "to offer services of any nature" as long as they "do not derogate DTV broadcast stations' obligations" to transmit at least one over-the-air video program signal at no direct charge to viewers, a distinction that Venture says allows a digital television signal to incorporate an FM analog subcarrier.

The basic ATSC 3.0 standard specifies a full 6 MHz channel for the digital signal, but running a hybrid DTV/FM service reduces the DTV transmission bandwidth slightly, shifting the center frequency of the digital signal about 160 kHz below the channel center. To ensure the analog FM signal does not interfere with the ATSC 3.0 DTV signal, a modified combiner and filtering system must be used prior to feeding the broadcast signals to the antenna.

A switchover to digital transmissions was not immediately required for low power TV stations, and some channel 6 stations retained their analog transmitters in order to function primarily as radio stations. The FCC notified these stations that eventually all low power TV stations would be required to convert to digital transmissions, which, after a series of extensions, was set for July 13, 2021. On July 6, 2021, an FCC Public Notice reiterated that "After 11:59 p.m. local time on July 13, 2021, LPTV/translator stations may no longer operate any facility in analog mode and all analog licenses shall automatically cancel at that time, without any affirmative action by the Commission." (A waiver, delaying the required change until January 10, 2022, was issued for 15 Alaska translators, but a low-power Alaska station broadcasting on channel 6, KNIK-LP in Anchorage, was not included in this waiver.) The prohibition of LPTV analog transmissions resulted in the elimination of an estimated 28 de facto radio operations, although some of these stations eventually returned after installing upgraded ATSC 3.0 transmitters.

Venture's KBKF-LD in San Jose, California, began transmitting an FM subcarrier using the ATSC 3.0 TV standard in February 2021. On June 10, 2021, the FCC issued a 6-month Special Temporary Authority (STA) grant allowing KBKF-LD to include analog FM broadcasts on 87.75 MHz using this dual transmission approach. A second Venture station, WRME-LD in Chicago, was also provisionally authorized to use the new standard, until January 10, 2022.

STA applications for ATSC 3.0/FM operation by KXDP-LD in Denver, WMTO-LD in Norfolk, Virginia and WTBS-LD in Atlanta were approved July 16, 2021, for the period through January 15, 2022. On July 27, 2021, an STA was issued for KZNO-LD in Big Bear Lake, California, expiring on January 27, 2022. As of July 20, 2023, the FCC had issued STA authorizations to a total of 13 stations.

== See also ==
- FM broadcasting in the United States
- 87.7 FM
- 87.8 FM
- Pulse 87
