= KBKF =

KBKF may refer to:

- KBKF-LD, a low-power television station (channel 6) licensed to San Jose, California, United States
- Buckley Space Force Base (ICAO code KBKF)
