= WTBS =

WTBS may refer to:

- WTBS-LD, a low-power television station (channel 6) licensed to Atlanta, Georgia, U.S.
- WPCH-TV, a television station (channel 17) licensed to Atlanta, Georgia, U.S., which used the WTBS call sign from 1979 to 2007
  - TBS (American TV channel), a nationwide cable channel spun off from WTBS
- WMBR, a radio station (88.1 FM) licensed to Cambridge, Massachusetts, U.S., which used the WTBS call sign from 1961 to 1979
- The British Broadcasting Corporation Wartime Broadcasting Service
- Legal entities of Jehovah's Witnesses:
  - Watch Tower Bible and Tract Society of Pennsylvania, the main corporation for worldwide activities of Jehovah's Witnesses
  - Watchtower Bible and Tract Society of New York, the corporation for administrative functions of Jehovah's Witnesses within the U.S.
