= KLVG =

KLVG may refer to:

- KLVG (AM), a radio station (780 AM) licensed to serve Fountain, Colorado, United States
- KLVG-FM, a radio station (107.5 FM) licensed to serve Pahrump, Nevada, United States
- KLVG-LD, a low-power television station (channel 6) licensed to serve Las Vegas, Nevada, United States
- KLKE (FM), a radio station (103.7 FM) licensed to serve Garberville, California, United States, which held the call sign KLVG from 1995 to 2025
