= WRME-LD =

Television and radio station in Chicago

ATSC 3.0 station
- Chicago, Illinois; United States
- Channels: Digital: 6 (VHF); Virtual: 33

Programming
- Affiliations: 6.1: Jewelry TV

Ownership
- Owner: Venture Technologies Group; (WLFM, LLC)
- Operator: Weigel Broadcasting
- Sister stations: WTVK; WCIU-TV; WWME-CD; WMEU-CD

History
- First air date: May 16, 2003
- Former call signs: W55DF (2003–2006); WLFM-LP (2006–2012); WKQX-LP (2012–2014; 2014); WIQI-LP (2014); WGWG-LP (2014–2015); WRME-LP (2015–2021)
- Former channel number: Analog: 55 (UHF, 2003–2007); 6 (VHF, 2007–2021)
- Call sign meaning: Radio MeTV

Technical information
- Licensing authority: FCC
- Facility ID: 128239
- Class: LD
- ERP: 3 kW
- HAAT: 385.1 m (1,263 ft)
- Transmitter coordinates: 41°53′56.1″N 87°37′23.2″W

Links
- Public license information: Public file; LMS

Radio station information
- Broadcast area: Chicago metro area
- Frequency: 87.7 MHz
- Branding: 87.7 MeTVFM

Programming
- Format: Soft AC; oldies

Technical information
- Class: A
- Repeater: (99.1-2) WMYX-FM HD2 (Milwaukee)

Links
- Webcast: Listen live (via Audacy)
- Website: metv.fm

WRME-LD (channel 33) is a low-power television station in Chicago, Illinois, United States, affiliated with Jewelry Television. The station's audio channel, transmitting at 87.75 MHz (or VHF channel 6), lies within the FM band; as a result, WRME-LD's audio channel operates as a radio station at 87.7 FM. Owned by Venture Technologies Group and operated under a local marketing agreement (LMA) by Weigel Broadcasting, the station airs a soft adult contemporary/oldies format via the 87.75 MHz audio channel under the brand 87.7 MeTV FM, a brand extension of Weigel's MeTV television network. The WRME-LD studios are co-located with Weigel's headquarters on North Halstead Street in Chicago's Greektown neighborhood, while the transmitter resides atop the John Hancock Center.

Because of the station's low-power status, WRME-LD is not subject to the FCC's educational and informational programming requirements, allowing a full 24/7 format without interruption for other programming. In November 2019, the station (as WRME-LP) began airing news and weather updates from WBBM-TV (channel 2) during the morning and afternoon drive times.

After the 2009 digital television transition for full-power stations, WRME-LP became one of several such "Franken-FM" stations that were actually analog TV stations on channel 6; the video signal aired unrelated material to the audio, including a loop of weather and traffic information. When low-power stations were required to transition to digital, Venture Technologies Group obtained special temporary authority to convert the station to ATSC 3.0 Next Gen TV and also maintain an analog audio signal on 87.7 FM. The ATSC 3.0 channel occupies the lower 5.509 MHz of the 6 MHz channel.

Officially, the second HD Radio channel of Audacy-owned WMYX-FM in Milwaukee is a repeater of WRME-LD's audio signal, and both stations identify together as "WRME-LD, Chicago and WMYX-FM-HD2, Milwaukee". The WMYX-HD2 signal also carried by the Audacy app, which is available throughout the United States and on its website.

== History ==
=== Move to Channel 6 ===
When the station first signed on the air in 2003, it broadcast on Channel 55 using the call sign W55DF. It later moved to Channel 6 because of Qualcomm's MediaFLO service expanding to the Chicago area. Its programming once consisted of infomercials, home shopping services, MTV Tr3s, and Azteca América. It became WLFM-LP in 2006.

On March 9, 2009, Venture announced that it signed letters of intent to lease out their Channel 6 signals on both WLFM-LP and KSFV-CA in Los Angeles's San Fernando Valley, which would pave the way for the launching a dance format on the stations. Programming was to have begun under that format June 1, 2009, and be patterned after Mega Media's New York City outlet WNYZ-LP and be branded as Pulse 87.

In the interim, on April 1, 2009, Channel 6 switched to an alternative country music format as "The L." One month later, Venture announced it would not pursue the deal with Mega Media. Channel 6 continued with the alt-country format until a format change in Chicago opened a new opportunity.

=== Smooth Jazz ===
On May 22, 2009, WNUA (95.5 FM) dropped its smooth jazz sound for Spanish contemporary music. That afternoon, Channel 6 immediately picked up the abandoned format, becoming an affiliate of the Broadcast Architecture Smooth Jazz Network, and adopting the name "87.7 Chicago's Smooth Jazz." Channel 6 originally broadcast still photographs of Chicago and Jazz musicians on its video signal, since all television licensees are still required to transmit video while on air. In the summer of 2011, Channel 6 began airing traffic maps and a weather scroll on its video signal.

Initially, WLFM's smooth jazz format consisted of round-the-clock programming from the Broadcast Architecture Smooth Jazz Network. But later on the station added two local weekday hosts, both veterans WNUA DJs: midday host Rick O'Dell (also the station's program director) and evening personality Loni Taylor. In addition, channel 6 featured syndicated shows from Kenny G, Mindi Abair, Dave Ramsey and Dave Koz along with local specialty shows, such as Paul Wertico's Wild World of Jazz Sunday nights at 9 p.m., The Sounds of Brazil with Scott Adams heard Saturdays at midnight, The Smooth Jazz Top 20 Countdown with Allen Kepler, Dinner Party with Bill Cochran, and Sunrise Soundscapes and The Smooth Jazz Sunday Brunch with Rick O'Dell. Channel 6 General Manager Pat Kelley had also worked at WNUA.

In July 2009, Channel 6 began simulcasting on a subchannel of WCHU-LD (33.2, mapped to virtual channel 61.2). In June 2011, Channel 6 became available on Comcast digital cable as Channel 877.

In October 2010, WLFM tweaked its format to "Smooth Adult Contemporary" (again using a Broadcast Architecture source). The format was a mix of mainstream and rhythmic adult contemporary tracks with a few smooth jazz instrumentals per hour.

=== All-News and Alternative Rock ===
On April 24, 2012, Merlin Media, LLC, entered into a local marketing agreement (LMA) with Venture Technologies Group to take over the programming and ad sales for WLFM-LP as of April 30, 2012. Merlin Media was headed by noted radio executive Randy Michaels. Venture Technologies retained the station's license and ownership. Later on the 24th, Smooth 87.7's Rick O'Dell revealed on the station's website that smooth jazz would be replaced on April 30, 2012. Venture Technologies management termed the LMA with Merlin as a "business decision" based in part on the future status of low-power analog TV stations, whose signals must be turned off or transitioned to digital by September 2015. "Smooth 87.7" ended before midnight on April 29, 2012, with David Sanborn's "Chicago Song" the last song played. Afterwards, the station changed over to a simulcast of Merlin's all-news station, WIQI (101.1 FM). (Twice-hourly news updates from WIQI were added to WLFM on April 24, Merlin's first noticeable change to the station.) A call sign change from WLFM-LP to WKQX-LP took effect on May 1, 2012.

The smooth jazz format continued on the HD3 subchannel of Merlin's WLUP-FM (97.9-HD3), which launched on May 3, 2012. Additionally, WLFM-LP alum Rick O'Dell launched an online radio station, SmoothJazzChicago.net, on November 12, 2012. The channel was added to the HD2 subchannel of WTMX (101.9-HD2) in January 2014.

On May 6, 2012, WKQX "Q87.7" ("Underground. Alternative.") was launched, with "Satellite" by Chicago band Rise Against as the first song played. The station, perhaps inspired by its low-FM dial position and its uncertain future ("Already there are some people maneuvering to shut us down"), cultivated a hard-edged "outlaw mystique." It targeted a younger audience that may normally listen to music through online sources. A message on the station's website at its launch noted that "older radios won't pick us up... so if someone has a radio that doesn't get 87.7FM, then they just don't get it!"

=== LMA with Cumulus Media ===
On January 3, 2014, Merlin Media announced a local marketing agreement with Cumulus Media that would have Cumulus take over operations of Merlin-owned 101.1 WIQI and 97.9 WLUP-FM. The deal also created an expansion of Cumulus' Chicago operations. The company already owns and operates talk station WLS (890 AM) and classic hits station WLS-FM (94.7).

In announcing the deal, Cumulus indicated that it would move the alternative rock format from WKQX-LP to WIQI. The move took place on January 10, 2014, with both 87.7 and 101.1 simulcasting for approximately 30–45 days. Once the simulcast ended, alt-rock remained on 101.1 which re-adopted the WKQX call sign on January 16, 2014. Cumulus' long-term plans for WKQX-LP were initially unclear. The last song played before 87.7 broke from the simulcast was "Intergalactic" by the Beastie Boys.

=== Sports Talk ===
Cumulus wrapped up its LMA with WKQX-LP on February 17, 2014. Tribune Broadcasting announced that it would enter into a local marketing agreement for WKQX-LP as an "FM expansion" for its primary station, WGN (720 AM). Venture applied to change the call sign of WKQX-LP to WGWG-LP.

On February 17, 2014, the Chicago Tribune reported that WKQX-LP would flip to a WGN-produced sports talk format known as "The Game." Jonathon Brandmeier hosted its morning show, while WGN's David Kaplan moved to late-mornings on "The Game." Howard Griffith and Alex Quigley hosted an early afternoon show, with former WMVP personalities Harry Teinowitz and Spike Manton in afternoon drive time, and Mark Carman hosting an evening show. The remaining dayparts featured NBC Sports Radio programming. The Game also served as the alternate station for the Chicago Blackhawks during conflicts with WGN's coverage of Chicago Cubs games, ending the previous agreement with WIND (AM 560).

The arrangement was initially slated to last through September 2015, the FCC's original deadline for converting low-power television stations to digital broadcasting. But in October 2014, the FCC voted to tentatively delay the low-power digital transition.

Until sometime in 2014, the FCC database reflected the station's city of license as Rochelle, Illinois, a community in Ogle County located south of Rockford. With the new Tribune LMA, the city of license became Chicago. The station's primary signal does not get far beyond Chicago's western suburbs. The station's signal range remains under restriction due to other Channel 6 stations nearby, WITI in Milwaukee and KWQC-TV in Davenport, Iowa, which had their analog broadcasts on Channel 6 and continue to use that designation for their digital virtual channels.

On November 20, 2014, Robert Feder reported that Tribune would discontinue The Game on December 31, 2014; Jonathon Brandmeier's program, which was simulcast from Tribune's Internet radio station WGN.fm, was also immediately dropped. The decision came in response to its low advertising revenue, along with poor ratings. On December 31, 2014, WGWG-LP was changed to an FM simulcast of WGN's talk programming until the end of Tribune's LMA with Venture Technologies Group.

=== LMA with Weigel Broadcasting ===
On December 30, 2014, Weigel Broadcasting, which owns WCIU-TV and several other low-power TV stations in Chicago, said it would take over WGWG-LP in February 2015. The station marked Weigel's first venture into the radio industry. Weigel assumed control on February 23, 2015, playing a soft oldies format branded as "MeTV FM." It would serve as a brand extension of its MeTV classic television network, seen locally on another low-power station, WWME-CD. The call letters were changed to WRME-LP.

MeTV FM features a broad playlist of approximately 3,500 songs, mostly from 1960 to 1989, in the soft to mid-tempo range. "Light My Fire" by The Doors was noted in 2018 as the hardest rock song on the station's playlist, its inclusion having been extensively debated among station staff. In recent years, the range of records played on WRME has expanded to include those by performers usually considered to be "Album-Oriented Rock" artists.

By May 2017, despite the obstacles posed by its frequency and limited signal, WRME was tied in the Nielsen ratings with its full-power competitors WJMK and WLS-FM at an audience share of 2.7, putting it 14th in the market. Weigel decided to syndicate the branding and format through a partnership with Envision Networks. By February 2018, WRME had risen to 6th in the market and second in middays.

To maintain the visual requirements of maintaining television service, WRME-LP's video signal displayed a screen layout reminiscent of that used by cable radio service Music Choice mixed with The Weather Channel's automated Weatherscan service. On the top of the screen, the current artist/song title is displayed, with the station logo to the right, while below it, a consistently panning map of the Chicago metropolitan area displays the latest expressway travel times and weather radar conditions for several parts of the region. Finally, along the right side of the screen, a visual station identification with the station's calls is in the bottom right corner, along with a display ad for Xfinity and the hour's current featured advertiser.

On July 13, 2021, as a result of the final transition deadline for low-power television stations, WRME-LP converted from analog directly to ATSC 3.0, becoming the first Next Gen TV station in Chicago. Its call sign switched to WRME-LD on July 15 to reflect this change, and took the virtual channel of 33. The lone channel broadcast on the television service is Jewelry Television, mapped to virtual channel 33.1. MeTV FM audio programming continued to be available in analog on 87.7 FM due to a Special Temporary Authority grant from the Federal Communications Commission (FCC). On July 20, 2023, an FCC "Report and Order" included this station as one of 13 "FM6" stations allowed to continue to operate an FM radio broadcast, as a "ancillary or supplementary" service. As of 2024, WRME's analog signal radius, freed of any need to carry video content, is comparable to that of most Chicago area full-power FM radio stations and is audible throughout the entirety of Chicagoland, with WRME-LD's signal radius also similar to carry its video programming.

== Subchannel ==
Subchannels of WRME-LD
Subchannel	Res.	Short name	Programming
6.1	720p	JTVHD	Jewelry TV

== See also ==
- WJMK (AM)
- WMYX-FM
