= WDCN-LD =

Television station in Fairfax, Virginia

ATSC 3.0 station
- Fairfax, Virginia; Washington, D.C.; United States
- City: Fairfax, Virginia
- Channels: Digital: 6 (VHF); Virtual: 6

Programming
- Affiliations: 6.1: The Country Network

Ownership
- Owner: Signal Above LLC
- Operator: Urban One

History
- Founded: 1996
- Former call signs: W42BE (1996–2007); W06CJ (2007–2008); WDCN-LP (2008–2021)
- Former channel number: Analog: 42 (UHF, 1996–2007), 6 (VHF, 2007–2021)

Technical information
- Licensing authority: FCC
- Facility ID: 20450
- Class: LD
- ERP: 3 kW
- HAAT: 189.9 m (623 ft)
- Transmitter coordinates: 38°52′28.2″N 77°13′23.6″W

Links
- Public license information: Public file; LMS

Radio station information
- Frequency: 87.7 MHz
- Branding: Latino 104.1/87.7

Programming
- Language: Spanish
- Format: Contemporary hit radio

Links
- Webcast: Listen live
- Website: latinoalaire.com

WDCN-LD (channel 6), branded as Latino 104.1/87.7, is a low-power television station licensed to Fairfax, Virginia, United States, serving the Washington, D.C., metropolitan area. Owned by Signal Above LLC, WDCN-LD markets itself as a conventional FM radio station, broadcasting Spanish contemporary hits.

WDCN-LD has its studios on Old Gallows Road in Tysons. The transmitter is on Lee Highway (US 29) near Interstate 495 (The Capital Beltway) in Merrifield.

== History ==
In the analog television era, stations on television channel 6 broadcast an FM audio signal at 87.75 MHz which is receivable by ordinary FM radios. Some low-powered stations – colloquially known as "Franken-FMs" – took advantage of this fact and a loophole in Federal Communications Commission (FCC) regulations that did not require a television station's video and audio content to be related (only that there is some sort of video content) to market themselves as radio stations.

WDCN-LP began broadcasting primarily audio content in 2009, prior to which it was a conventional television station broadcasting Spanish religious programming. At first, it was to be leased to Mega Media as the second outlet for Pulse 87, which had already been on the air at WNYZ-LP in New York City; the deal fell through and Mega went bankrupt later in the year. Instead, the station began broadcasting Spanish hits as "La Nueva 87.7". The station's branding changed to "DC 87.7" in 2022 when Costa Media took over programming at the same time it purchased WFAX (1220 AM). The local marketing agreement with Costa Media ended on December 31, 2025, and WDCN-LD switched to a simulcast of WLNO (104.1 FM), which is also Spanish CHR, the following day.

=== Permanent radio operation ===
Low-powered analog stations were exempt from the 2009 digital television transition, allowing WDCN-LP to continue operating as a Franken-FM. However, the later set a 2021 deadline for all low-powered stations to cease operating in analog. Several Franken-FMs proposed experimentally embedding an FM carrier at 87.7 MHz inside an ATSC 3.0 signal, which tests later showed to be technically feasible; the FCC initially allowed this under special temporary authority grants, provided the stations broadcast at least one accompanying television service, and the FM and television signals had similar coverage. On July 20, 2023, an FCC "Report and Order" included this station as one of 13 "FM6" stations allowed to continue to operate an FM radio broadcast, as a "ancillary or supplementary" service.

=== Switch to digital ===
WDCN-LP signed off on July 13, 2021, the day on which the FCC ended all analog television operation nationwide. It restarted operations on October 5, 2021, carrying The Country Network and the embedded FM signal.

WDCN-LP previously simulcast on co-owned WOWZ-LP, another low-power channel 6 station, licensed to Salisbury, Maryland, and serving the Ocean City–Salisbury area. That station has since switched to a simulcast of WVES.

=== Sports programming ===
From 2010 through 2012, WDCN-LP was the home for Spanish-language broadcasts of D.C. United soccer games. WDCN-LP carried all of the team's games, including those not broadcast on television.

Since the 2019 NFL season, WDCN-LD is the flagship Spanish-language radio station of the NFL's Baltimore Ravens.

== Subchannel ==
Subchannel of WDCN-LD (ATSC 3.0)
Subchannel	Res.	Short name	Programming
6.1	1080p	WDCN	The Country Network
