= WPGF-LD =

Television station in Memphis, Tennessee

ATSC 3.0 station
- Memphis, Tennessee; United States
- Channels: Digital: 6 (VHF); Virtual: 6

Programming
- Affiliations: Unknown

Ownership
- Owner: Flinn Broadcasting; (George Flinn)
- Sister stations: WFBI-LD, W46EF-D

History
- Founded: January 2007
- Former call signs: W17DA-D (2007–2010)
- Former channel numbers: Digital: 17 (UHF, 2007–2021)
- Former affiliations: Estrella TV (until 2021); Silent (2021–2022)

Technical information
- Licensing authority: FCC
- Facility ID: 23848
- ERP: 3 kW
- HAAT: 238.8 m (783 ft)
- Transmitter coordinates: 35°12′34.3″N 89°49′1.4″W

Links
- Public license information: Public file; LMS

Radio station information
- Frequency: 87.7 MHz
- Branding: 87.7 Right On Radio

Programming
- Format: Urban oldies

WPGF-LD (channel 6) is a low-power television station in Memphis, Tennessee, United States. The station's audio channel, transmitting at 87.75 MHz (or VHF channel 6), lies within the FM band; as a result, WPGF-LD's audio channel operates as a radio station at 87.7 FM. Owned by Flinn Broadcasting, the station airs an urban oldies format via the 87.75 MHz audio channel under the brand "Right On Radio". WPGF-LD's transmitter is located on the northeast side of Memphis near Bartlett, Tennessee, just off US 64.

Flinn Broadcasting surrendered WPGF-LD's license to the Federal Communications Commission on June 20, 2021, and the FCC canceled it the following day. At the time, it was an affiliate of Estrella TV. The station returned to the air in January 2022 under a new license and converted to ATSC 3.0 broadcasting that month. On July 20, 2023, an FCC "Report and Order" included this station as one of 13 "FM6" stations allowed to continue to operate an FM radio broadcast, as a "ancillary or supplementary" service.
