= 87.8 FM =

FM radio frequency

This is a list of radio stations that broadcast on FM frequency 87.8 MHz:

== Australia ==
- UCFM in Canberra, Australian Capital Territory
- Radio Austral in Sydney, New South Wales
- Vision Radio Network in Griffith, New South Wales
- Vision Radio Network in Mudgee, New South Wales
- Vision Radio Network in Young, New South Wales
- Vision Radio Network in Moree, New South Wales
- Vision Radio Network in Gold Coast, Queensland
- Vision Radio Network in Mackay, Queensland
- Vision Radio Network in Port Lincoln, South Australia
- Vision Radio Network in Port Pirie, South Australia
- Kiss FM Australia in Geelong, Victoria
- Wodonga TAFE Radio in Wodonga, Victoria
- Newy 87.8 FM in Newcastle, New South Wales

== China ==
- CNR Business Radio in Haikou
- CNR Hong Kong Radio
- TJTRS Tianjin Binhai Radio

== France ==
- France Inter at Paris

== Ireland ==
- RTÉ Radio 1 from Clermont Carn, County Louth - this transmitter also provides coverage across the nearby border to a significant area of Northern Ireland

== Malaysia ==
- 8FM in Kedah, Perlis, Penang & Taiping, Perak
- Sinar in Johor Bahru, Johor & Singapore

== New Zealand ==
- Various low-power stations up to 1 watt

== United States ==
On July 20, 2023, the Federal Communications Commission (FCC) adopted regulations authorizing a limited number of low power TV stations, on TV channel 6, to also broadcast a supplemental FM radio signal, with a center frequency of 87.75 MHz. The FCC describes these as "FM6" stations. These stations use a modified version of the ATSC 3.0 "NextGen TV" standard, which provides for both a digital TV and supplemental analog FM radio signal. While most of these stations market themselves on "87.7", (due to the .2 MHz odd-decimal spacing used in the United States) such stations are equally audible on 87.8 MHz.
