= Pulse 87 =

Internet radio station in New York City

- New York City; United States
- Broadcast area: Worldwide
- Frequency: Online only
- Branding: Pulse 87

Programming
- Language: English
- Format: Dance–EDM

Ownership
- Owner: Mega Media

History
- First air date: 2008

Links
- Webcast: Listen live
- Website: www.pulse87ny.com

Pulse 87 is an online radio station with an electronic dance music music format. It started as the audio feed of a channel-6 "Franken-FM" television station in New York City, audible on traditional FM radios at 87.7, before moving solely to streaming online.

== History ==
The brand was formerly owned and operated by Mega Media, which it operated under a leasing deal with WNYZ-LP, broadcasting at 87.7 (channel 6), with plans to expand the format to other cities only to incur financial losses and disputes over the business arrangements, leading to the station's demise in 2009. In February 2010, the format was resurrected as an online non-profit Internet station under new management following the bankruptcy and liquidation of its former owner.

== Return to terrestrial radio ==
On June 24, 2014, LKCM Broadcasting, the owners of KYLI in Las Vegas, adopted the "Pulse 87" brand, replacing the interactive Jelli format it had used since 2011. This brought the Pulse brand back to radio for the first time since its 2009 demise. The Pulse 87 brand continued online. KYLI was sold in August 2016 and changed formats the following October.

On October 24, 2014, Metro Radio announced that its FM translator, W249BE Alexandria, Virginia, would become the second station to adopt the Pulse 87 brand. The station, which simulcasts Spanish AC WTNT, covers the Washington metropolitan area. The move was the first time since 2009, when it attempted to bring the format to the market as the proposed format for WDCN-LP until it was cancelled at the last minute by the station's owners. However, the plans for W249BE fell through after it was announced.

On January 8, 2018, Entercom (now called Audacy Inc.) entered a deal to bring Pulse 87 to Los Angeles as a HD2 subchannel of the top 40/contemporary hit radio KAMP-FM, billing it as "Pulse 97.1 HD2". The deal was expanded to Entercom's Radio.com platform the following March.

By October 2018, KAMP-HD2 was no longer a simulcast of Pulse 87.

As of 2026, WDRE (AM) and 104.9 W285FX began simulcasting Pulse 87
