= KNIK-LD =

Television station in Anchorage, Alaska

- Anchorage, Alaska; United States
- Channels: Digital: 6 (VHF); Virtual: 6
- Branding: Alaska's Real Country

Programming
- Affiliations: Independent

Ownership
- Owner: Iglesia Pentecostal Vispera del Fin

History
- Founded: July 1999
- Former call signs: K06LY (1989–1999); KZND-LP (1999–2007); KOAN-LP (2007–2009); KABA-LP (2009); KNIK-LP (2009–2023)
- Former channel numbers: Analog: 6 (VHF, 1999–2023)
- Call sign meaning: Knik River

Technical information
- Licensing authority: FCC
- Facility ID: 21492
- Class: LD
- ERP: 920 watts
- HAAT: 155.6 m (510 ft)
- Transmitter coordinates: 61°4′0″N 149°44′44″W
- Translator(s): K253CA (98.5 FM, Eagle River)

Links
- Public license information: LMS

Radio station information
- Frequency: 87.7 MHz

KNIK-LD (channel 6) is a low-power television station in Anchorage, Alaska, United States, which is currently silent. The station was one of very few low-power television stations that operated predominantly as a radio station by way of the fact that many FM radio receivers can tune in a VHF channel 6 television audio carrier at 87.75 MHz. This technique is made more potent due to a formerly unforeseen interpretation of deregulatory language in FCC low-power television station regulations:

Sec. 73.653 Operation of TV aural and visual transmitters.

The aural and visual transmitters may be operated independently of each other or, if operated simultaneously, may be used with different and unrelated program material.

This means that KNIK-LD need not broadcast any particular image so long as it broadcasts a video signal and that the audio and video need not be technically synchronized.

== History ==
KNIK-LD started under this theory of operation with the call sign KZND-LP in July 1999. The station, under the auspices of operator Ubik Broadcasting, began broadcasting a modern rock format in FM Stereo marketed as 87.7 "The End". Anchorage area radio competitors saw then KZND-LP's entry into the market as cheating, so they raised a complaint with the FCC. The agency concluded that it was not sufficient for KZND-LP to show the ability to broadcast video, but must actually do so to operate as a low-power station. KZND-LP complied by broadcasting still pictures and later augmented the video feed by installing a camera in the studio for use during the live morning show.

In early 2005, the modern rock format and call sign KZND became available on a newly acquired conventional FM signal, 94.7 MHz FM owned and operated by Tati Broadcasting. The KZND radio format was simulcast on both facilities until July 2007 when the low-power station was switched over to Business Radio, and its call sign changed to KOAN.

The predominant reason for the move of the modern rock format to the FM band was that since Arbitron would not rate KZND-LP as a radio station, the operation consistently underperformed in terms of revenue. KZND's ownership claimed KZND-LP was popular among the Anchorage radio audience but no data ever backed up this assertion. Arbitron agreed with Anchorage commercial broadcasters that 87.7 was a licensed TV station and should not be printed as a radio frequency.

Arbitron has reportedly made some accommodations for providing ratings for WNYZ-LD in New York City. However, the PPM rating system is not available in many radio markets and Arbitron ratings will not accurately reflect the radio audience so long as Arbitron omits low-power operations of the KZND-LP mold from overall market reporting.

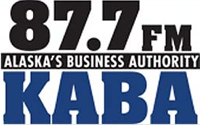
KABA-LP logo

In June 2009, the station changed its call sign to KABA-LP, and began airing a business format formerly heard at 1020 AM (which had itself formerly used the KABA callsign, and took the KOAN call letters abandoned by KABA-LP). KABA-LP was short lived, as it was replaced that September by the call sign KNIK-LP, and the format was changed to smooth jazz; both the call sign and format were previously associated with the current KMVN (105.7). (Both KOAN (now KVNT) and KMVN are owned by Tati Broadcasting, which operates KNIK-LP.)

On January 18, 2019, KNIK-LP changed its audio format from smooth jazz (as "The Breeze") to classic country, branded as "Alaska's Real Country".

In 2020, KNIK-LP was sold for $10,000 to Falcoln Broadcasting.

=== The future ===
The future of KNIK-LP on 87.75 MHz FM was in some doubt as the channel 6 channel position had been assigned to KYES-TV (which was commonly owned with KNIK-LP) for digital broadcasting after the analog signal was discontinued in 2009. However, information from Fireweed Communications Corporation President Jeremy Lansman indicated that KYES-TV would remain on channel 5, post DTV conversion, in order to re-use existing KYES-TV analog broadcast equipment. Fireweed has been assigned a digital companion channel for KNIK-LP on channel 3.

It appears that the unusual strategy pioneered by licensee Fireweed Communications Corporation and previous operator, Ubik Broadcasting, may have a lasting impact—in 2004, former TV weatherman Jeff Chang began his own low-power station on the Hawaiian island of Kauai, which he claims was inspired by KZND-LP. At least two other facilities, WNYZ-LD and KSFV-CA, are owned and operated under the same regulatory provisions by longtime acquaintances of Jeremy Lansman, owner of Fireweed.

The station was licensed for digital operation on channel 6 effective May 4, 2023, changing its call sign to KNIK-LD.
