= KZNO-LD =

Television station in Los Angeles

ATSC 3.0 station
- Los Angeles, California; United States
- Channels: Digital: 6 (VHF); Virtual: 12

Programming
- Affiliations: 12.1: Jewelry Television

Ownership
- Owner: Venture Technologies Group, LLC

History
- Founded: August 7, 1996
- Former call signs: K06MU (1996–2015); KZNO-LP (2015–2021)
- Former channel numbers: Analog: 6 (VHF, 1996–2021); Virtual: 6 (2021–2022)

Technical information
- Licensing authority: FCC
- Facility ID: 63149
- Class: LD
- ERP: 3 kW
- HAAT: 848.8 m (2,785 ft)
- Transmitter coordinates: 34°12′45.6″N 118°3′46.8″W

Links
- Public license information: Public file; LMS

Radio station information
- United States
- Frequency: 87.7 MHz
- Branding: Guadalupe Radio 87.7

Programming
- Format: Spanish religious

Links
- Website: guadaluperadio.com

KZNO-LD (channel 12) is a low-power television station in Los Angeles, California, United States. Owned by the Venture Technologies Group, it transmits from the Mount Harvard Radio Site in the San Gabriel Mountains as a Spanish-language religious radio station that can be received at 87.7 FM. Its ATSC 3.0 video feed broadcasts Jewelry Television on digital channel 12.1.

== History ==
The station was founded on August 7, 1996, as translator K06MU in Big Bear Lake. It was also available to area subscribers of Charter Cable on channel 6. The station's programming at the time was similar to a public-access television cable television channel, consisting primarily of news, public affairs and travel programs produced by local residents of the Big Bear Valley.

In 2016, ownership was transferred from Bear Valley Broadcasting to Venture Technologies, which previously owned KSFV-CA, which also operated on analog channel 6 as a radio station, which, as KSFV-CD, now shares transmitting facilities on Mount Harvard (a peak adjacent to Mount Wilson) in Los Angeles County with Ontario-licensed KPOM-CD.

While operating as an analog TV station, KZNO-LP audio could be heard locally by radio receivers on 87.7 FM, since TV channel 6 is in the 82–88 MHz range. Because it was a low-power station, it was not obligated to switch to a digital signal on June 12, 2009, which was required of all full-power TV stations in the United States.

As of July 9, 2021, KZNO-LP had ceased its analog TV transmissions, prior to the July 13, 2021, Federal Communications Commission (FCC) deadline for LPTV stations to end analog TV transmissions. The station was licensed for digital operation effective July 15, 2021, changing its call sign to KZNO-LD at the same time. Effective July 27, 2021, the station was granted a six-month special temporary authority to resume audio transmissions receivable on 87.7 FM. On July 20, 2023, an FCC "Report and Order" included this station as one of 13 "FM6" stations allowed to continue to operate an FM radio broadcast, as a "ancillary or supplementary" service.
