= KXDP-LD =

ATSC 3.0 station
- Denver, Colorado; United States
- Channels: Digital: 6 (VHF); Virtual: 18
- Branding: La Invasora 87.7

Ownership
- Owner: Syncom Media Group, Inc.

History
- Former call signs: K55IO (2003–2005); K30IR (2005); KLPT-LP (2005–2010); KXDP-LP (2010–2021)
- Former channel numbers: Analog: 55 (UHF, 2003–2005); 30 (UHF, 2005–2010); 6 (VHF, 2010–2021)
- Former affiliations: ESPN Deportes Radio (July 7–27, 2010)
- Call sign meaning: Denver Deportes (former format)

Technical information
- Licensing authority: FCC
- Facility ID: 67552
- Class: LD
- ERP: 3 kW
- HAAT: 419.3 m (1,376 ft)
- Transmitter coordinates: 39°54′48″N 105°17′33″W

Links
- Public license information: Public file; LMS
- Website: www.lainvasoradenver.com

Radio station information
- Frequency: 87.7 MHz

Programming
- Format: Regional Mexican

KXDP-LD (channel 18) is a low-power television station in Denver, Colorado, United States. Owned by Mount Pleasant, South Carolina–based Syncom Media Group, it broadcasts a Regional Mexican radio format as "La Invasora 87.7".

== History ==
Because the station initially broadcast an analog signal on channel 6, its audio could be received at 87.75 MHz FM. Originally carrying a Spanish format, the station's audio programming changed to sports with ESPN Deportes Radio on July 7, 2010, with English-language local programming on July 27, 2010. The English language programming was soon moved to KDSP 102.3.

The station received its license for digital operation on July 12, 2021, changing its call sign to KXDP-LD, at which point the analog radio signal went silent. However, on July 18, 2021, KXDP-LD received special temporary authority from the Federal Communications Commission (FCC) to again air its audio signal on 87.75 MHz FM, now using a modified version of the ATSC 3.0 digital TV standard. On July 20, 2023, an FCC "Report and Order" included this station as one of 13 "FM6" stations allowed to continue to operate an FM radio broadcast, as a "ancillary or supplementary" service.
