= KLVG-LD =

Hybrid radio and television station in Las Vegas

ATSC 3.0 station
- Las Vegas, Nevada (Note: Originally licensed to St. George, Utah; moved to Las Vegas in 2013.); United States
- Channels: Digital: 6 (VHF)

Programming
- Affiliations: 6.1: Diya TV

Ownership
- Owner: Obidia Porras
- Operator: Latino Hustle Group

History
- Founded: 2002
- Former call signs: K67HK (2002–2010); KGHD-LP (2010–2022); KGHD-LD (2022–2025)
- Former channel number: Analog: 67 (UHF), 6 (VHF, until 2021)
- Former affiliations: TBN
- Call sign meaning: "K-Love Vegas"

Technical information
- Licensing authority: FCC
- Facility ID: 130027
- Class: LD
- ERP: 3 kW
- HAAT: 546.8 m (1,794 ft)
- Transmitter coordinates: 35°56′46″N 115°2′37″W

Links
- Public license information: Public file; LMS

Radio station information
- Frequency: 87.7 MHz
- Branding: K-Love 87.7

Programming
- Format: Christian contemporary

Links
- Website: www.klove.com

KLVG-LD (channel 6) is a low-power television station in Las Vegas, Nevada, United States. The station is owned by Obidia Porras.

KLVG-LD is operated as a hybrid radio/TV station. The TV portion broadcasts in the ATSC 3.0 (NextGen TV) standard and airs programming from Diya TV. The radio station is broadcast at 87.75 MHz, and airs K-Love.

== History ==
The station began operations in 2002 as K67HK (channel 67) in St. George, Utah. It was built by the Trinity Broadcasting Network (TBN) and broadcast TBN programs with 1.3 kW ERP.

In early 2010, K67HK was bought by Obidia Porras of Victorville, California; Porras operated KUHD-LP and other "franken-FMs" that use VHF analog channel 6. Needing to vacate the 700 MHz band, K67HK moved to channel 6. Porras then relocated the channel from a transmitter site near Interstate 15 and Brigham Road to West Mountain Peak. In 2010, K67HK became KGHD-LP. KGHD embarked on a piecemeal relocation down I-15 to Las Vegas, starting with a September 2010 move to a facility near Overton, Nevada. Not long after, KGHD went off the air due to a malfunctioning generator. The generator had provided the only source of electrical service to the transmitter, leaving few solutions for the problem aside from finding a new home. KGHD filed another request to move in 2011 to a site at Apex, located on I-15 northeast of Las Vegas. However, its final relocation took place in 2013 to Black Mountain, the main television and radio transmitter site in Las Vegas. The Apex site's air conditioner had malfunctioned, jeopardizing the transmitter equipment.

Once it was resituated, KGHD's first radio programming was a grupera format known as "La Primera"; during this time, Humberto Luna hosted the station's morning show, and the station (which, as a TV station, was required to broadcast video) aired a 30-minute video loop. After a period of silence which began in summer of 2015, KGHD returned in May 2016 as "La Raza" with a similar format. In 2020, the station changed names and operators, becoming "Fiesta 87.7 FM" (or "Fiesta Las Vegas") after it was acquired by Latino Hustle Group LLC.

As a result of the end of analog broadcasting for low-power stations on July 13, 2021, "Fiesta Las Vegas" operators purchased K251BS (98.1 FM), a translator that could be fed by the HD Radio subchannel of another station (KLUC-FM) to air its programming. Following this, the channel subsequently rebranded as "Fiesta 98.1" and moved its operations to the new frequency.

In February 2022, KGHD station owner Porras filed to convert the station to operations in the dual ATSC 3.0/FM mode in order to resume radio service, and on September 29, 2022, the station relaunched as "Area 87.7" under the call sign KGHD-LD, featuring a mix of dance, hip-hop and alternative. By November 18, the station switched to dance full time and rebranded as "Acid 87.7". On July 20, 2023, a Federal Communications Commission "Report and Order" included this station as one of 13 "FM6" stations allowed to continue to operate an FM radio broadcast, as a "ancillary or supplementary" service.

On October 6, 2023, at 5 p.m., the format, management, and staff of KGHD was transferred to KHYZ as "Vibe 99.7"; on October 13, KGHD relaunched its dance music format under new management as "Club 87.7", including DJ Chris Cox as music director, and Las Vegas-based promoter Frankie Anobile as program director.

In October 2025, the station dropped the dance music format and flipped to contemporary Christian music via the K-Love network; the flip gave K-Love its third signal in the Las Vegas area, alongside 91.1 KVKL (which rimshots the north end of the city) and Spring Valley's K236BM (which rimshots the southeast of the city). The station's call sign was changed to KLVG-LD to reflect the new affiliation.

== Subchannel ==
Subchannel of KLVG-LD
| Channel | Res. | Short name | Programming |
|---|---|---|---|
| 6.1 | | | Diya TV |

== See also ==
- KUHD-LD, another "franken-FM" owned by Porras
- K251BS, the current home of KLVG's previous broadcast "Fiesta Las Vegas"
