= WTBS-LD =

Television station in Atlanta

ATSC 3.0 station
- Atlanta, Georgia; United States
- Channels: Digital: 6 (VHF); Virtual: 6
- Branding: WTBS TV 26

Programming
- Affiliations: 6.1: France 24

Ownership
- Owner: Moon Beam Media & Broadcasting; (Prism Broadcasting Network, Inc.)
- Sister stations: WANN-CD 29 (32.x)

History
- First air date: May 31, 1988
- Former call signs: W56CD (1988–1997); W26BT (1997–2000); WANX-LP (2000–2007); WTBS-LP (2007–2021)
- Call sign meaning: "Turner Broadcasting System" (Derived from the former owner and call sign of WPCH-TV)

Technical information
- Licensing authority: FCC
- Facility ID: 53584
- Class: LD
- ERP: 1.5 kW
- HAAT: 37.6 m (123 ft)
- Transmitter coordinates: 33°44′40.9″N 84°21′35.7″W

Links
- Public license information: Public file; LMS

Radio station information
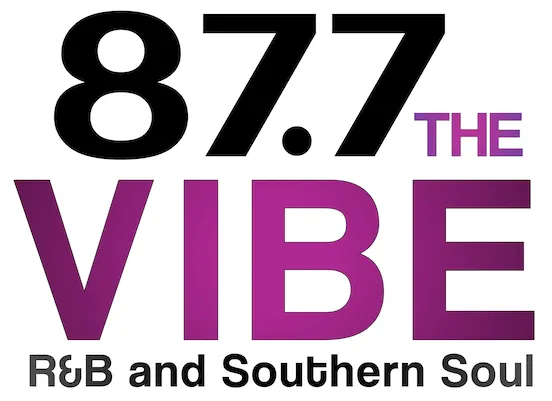
- Frequency: 87.7 MHz
- Branding: 87.7 The Vibe

Programming
- Format: Urban adult contemporary
- Affiliations: Compass Media Networks

Links
- Website: 877thevibe.com

WTBS-LD (channel 6) is a low-power television station in Atlanta, Georgia, United States. Although licensed as a TV station, it primarily functions as a radio station on 87.7 FM. It has been owned by Moon Beam Media & Broadcasting, and its transmitter site is located at the American Tower Site on Chester Avenue in downtown Atlanta.

The original WTBS-LD (channel 26) was also a low-power television station in Atlanta, affiliated with Estrella TV. The station, which broadcast six subchannels, was a digital satellite of the current WTBS-LD, then known as WTBS-LP.

The digital transmitter, which signed on in early January 2011, was, with its sister station WANN-CD, located just northeast of the city on one of the two large towers on Briarcliff Road, at the same site along with CW affiliate WPCH-TV (channel 17), Univision owned-and-operated station WUVG-DT (channel 34), independent station WANF (channel 46), TBN O&O WHSG-TV (channel 63), and several other stations.

The original WTBS-LD's license was canceled by the Federal Communications Commission on March 17, 2021.

== History ==
The station signed on as W56CD in Rome, Georgia; then W26BT; WANX-LP in January 2000; and WTBS-LP on October 15, 2007. The WANX call letters were formerly used by an independent station WANF and the WTBS call letters were formerly used by the station now known as WPCH.

In 2014, the analog WTBS-LP reappeared under special temporary authority on TV channel 6, which can also be received on 87.75 MHz of the FM dial. All analog television channels had been scheduled to cease broadcasting in September 2015; this was suspended by the FCC in April of that year. In 2017, it was announced that July 13, 2021, would be the new analog low-power television transmission shutoff date. Analog channel 6 later broadcast an urban AC format branded as "Mix 87.7", which is also heard via stereo audio on 87.75 FM. Steve Hegwood, the operator of Mix 87.7 announced it would cease using the WTBS frequency on January 31, 2019, due to financial shortfalls and an overcompetitive market for radio targeted at Atlanta's black community. As of February 1, 2019, WTBS-LP became a Regional Mexican station called "La Invasora".

WTBS-LP was licensed for digital operation on July 14, 2021, and changed its call sign to WTBS-LD. On July 16, the station received special temporary authority from the Federal Communications Commission (FCC) to provide an ancillary audio signal at 87.7 FM. On July 20, 2023, an FCC "Report and Order" included this station as one of 13 "FM6" stations allowed to continue to operate an FM radio broadcast, as a "ancillary or supplementary" service.

Sometime between 2020 and 2022, La Invasora 87.7 became La Que Buena 87.7 and retained its Regional Mexican format.

On January 13, 2025, La Que Buena 87.7 became 87.7 The Vibe and changed their format to urban adult contemporary.

== Subchannel ==
Subchannel of WTBS-LD
| Subchannel | Res. | Short name | Programming |
|---|---|---|---|
| 6.1 | 1080i | WTBS-HD | France 24 |
| 6.2 | Audio only | Vibe | Audio of 87.7 The Vibe |

The station is currently broadcasting using ATSC 3.0.
