= KBKF-LD =

Television station in San Jose, California

Coordinates: 37°6′38.9″N 121°50′40.8″W

ATSC 3.0 station
- San Jose, California; United States
- Channels: Digital: 6 (VHF); Virtual: 6

Programming
- Affiliations: 6.2: U Channel

Ownership
- Owner: Venture Technologies Group, LLC

History
- Founded: March 22, 2004
- Former call signs: K26HN (2004); KBKF-LP (2004–2021)

Technical information
- Licensing authority: FCC
- Facility ID: 127882
- Class: LD
- ERP: 2 kW
- HAAT: 776.85 m (2,549 ft)

Links
- Public license information: Public file; LMS

Radio station information
- Frequency: 87.7 MHz
- Branding: Suno 87.7

Programming
- Format: Bollywood music

Links
- Website: suno877.com

KBKF-LD (channel 6) is a low-power television station in San Jose, California, United States. Owned by Venture Technologies Group, it transmits from an antenna on Loma Prieta Peak.

Although licensed as a TV station, KBKF-LD primarily functions as a radio station, broadcasting Bollywood music that can be heard by FM radios at 87.7 MHz. Its ATSC 3.0 video feed broadcasts U Channel on digital channel 6.2.

== History ==
Originally KBKF-LP, it initially transmitted as an analog TV station, taking advantage of the fact that the analog TV standard for channel 6 specifies the audio portion of the transmission as an FM signal centered on 87.75 MHz. This can be picked up by most FM receivers at 87.7 FM.

Faced with an approaching July 13, 2021, FCC deadline requiring all LPTV stations to convert from analog to digital transmissions, Venture Technologies developed a version of the ATSC 3.0 digital TV standard that allows an analog FM audio subcarrier to coexist with the digital TV signal.

Now operating as a digital LPTV station with the call sign KBKF-LD, this station was used as a test site, and began dual digital TV/analog FM transmissions in February 2021. On June 10, 2021, the Federal Communications Commission (FCC) issued a six month long Special Temporary Authority (STA) grant allowing KBKF-LD to continue analog FM broadcasts on 87.75 MHz using this method. On July 20, 2023, an FCC "Report and Order" included this station as one of 13 "FM6" stations allowed to continue to operate an FM radio broadcast, as a "ancillary or supplementary" service.

On April 13, 2025, KBKF-LD switched to a Bollywood music format branded "Suno 87.7", replacing the previous Air1 worship music format.

== See also ==
- KSCZ-LD
