= WNYZ-LD =

Television station in New York City that operates as a radio station

ATSC 3.0 station
- New York, New York; United States
- Channels: Digital: 6 (VHF); Virtual: 6

Programming
- Affiliations: 6.1: Independent

Ownership
- Owner: K Media, LLC; (Sound of Long Island, Inc.)

History
- Founded: July 2, 1987
- First air date: 1998
- Former call signs: W33BS (1998–2003); WNYZ-LP (2003–2022)
- Former channel number: Analog: 33 (UHF, 1998-2003), 6 (VHF, 2003–2021)

Technical information
- Licensing authority: FCC
- Facility ID: 56043
- Class: LD
- ERP: 3 kW
- HAAT: 202.2 m (663 ft)
- Transmitter coordinates: 40°44′50.3″N 73°56′37.5″W
- Repeater: (94.7 MHz) WXBK-HD3 (Newark, New Jersey)

Links
- Public license information: Public file; LMS

Radio station information
- Broadcast area: New York metropolitan area
- Frequency: 87.7 MHz
- Branding: Voice of New York Radio Korea

Programming
- Format: Korean; full-service

Links
- Webcast: Listen live

WNYZ-LD is a low-power television station licensed to serve New York, New York, owned by K Media. It broadcasts on VHF channel 6, commonly known as an "FM6 operation" because the audio portion of the signal lies at 87.75 MHz, receivable by analog FM radios, tuned to the 87.75 frequency. Throughout its existence, the station has operated closer to a radio station than a television station. Prior to 2021, WNYZ-LD broadcast video, usually silent films, which are repeated throughout the day to fulfill the Federal Communications Commission (FCC) requirement that video be broadcast on the licensed frequency. The station airs this programming without commercials, while viewers hear the audio of WWRU out of Jersey City, New Jersey.

== History ==
=== As W33BS ===
The station originated in 1987. It first signed on in 1998 as W33BS licensed to serve Darien, Connecticut; later as UHF channel 33.

=== As WNYZ-LP ===
The station was moved to VHF channel 6 in 2003, and the call sign was changed to WNYZ-LP. At that time the station's city of license was changed to New York, New York. The station's original owner, Reverend Dr. Carrie L. Thomas, sold the station to the now defunct Island Broadcasting Company after its transition to channel 6. The new owner dropped its religious format, and began operating WNYZ as an FM radio station at 87.7 MHz, just below the standard FM band frequencies. Since the New York City FM radio dial is significantly crowded, the market had not added a station to the FM band since 1985. This unconventional work-around effectively extended the available FM band in the city. The audio programming broadcast over WNYZ was originally Russian pop music. The station was branded as, "Radio Everything" (Russian: "Radio Vsyo").

=== Brief digital operation ===
In November 2008, Island Broadcasting installed an Axcera DT325B digital VHF transmitter with the Axciter/Bandwidth Enhancement Technology (BET) option, which permitted WNYZ-LP to simultaneously transmit a single 480i SD digital stream using virtual channel 1.1, along with the analog audio carrier on 87.75 MHz. This allowed the station to serve both its radio and television audiences. At first, WNYZ broadcast color bars, a legal ID, and a message telling viewers to listen to 87.7 FM. Then in 2009, the station broadcast The Jared Whitham Channel featuring Jared Whitham, a bespectacled local area comic/musician. The station operated in this hybrid analog/digital mode for just over one year.

=== Pulse 87 ===
From February 11, 2008, to October 30, 2009, WNYZ-LP was leased to Brooklyn-based Mega Media Group, that programmed the station with a rhythmic contemporary format, branded as Pulse 87.

Joel Salkowitz, the station's program director and a former employee of WQHT, told the online website All Access about Pulse 87's musical direction: "The station is a top 40/rhythmic, leaning away from rock and rap and more towards club and dance sounds in their place. Familiar, rhythmic hits mixed with the very best new music. This is a current/recurrent-based radio station. The station's format, which features more cutting-edge dance music, is unique in New York City as WKTU currently plays a more classic rhythmic adult contemporary dance format. The format is also rarely seen in the US as only a handful of stations carry this format in America." The station transmitted from the Citigroup Building in Long Island City, and Pulse 87.7 IDs alluded to it as "...that big blue building in Queens."

=== Streaming relaunch ===
Pulse 87 has since been relaunched as a streaming station, still operated by Salkowitz, who has purchased the Pulse 87 automation equipment and the intellectual property in a bankruptcy auction.

=== Financial troubles and bankruptcy ===
Mega Media had been in serious financial trouble long before it launched Pulse 87. This came to a head on August 12, 2009, when Mega Media filed for bankruptcy, reporting $3.5 million in liabilities against assets of just $180,000. Mega Media said it had hoped to continue operating Pulse while it restructured under Chapter 11. On October 30, 2009, the lease between Mega Media Group and Island Broadcasting ended because Island Broadcasting did not receive the $500,000 it was owed according to the stipulation and order regarding the time-brokerage agreement. Island Broadcasting was under no obligation to continue allowing Pulse 87 to use their signal without payment for the lease. Pulse 87 went off the air on October 30, 2009, at 5:00 pm.

=== Party 105 era ===
On November 2, 2009, JVC Broadcasting's WPTY "Party 105" took over the 87.7 frequency. The same programming airing on WPTY, branded Party 105 (in Suffolk County) was heard on 87.7. The music, however, was not the same as the Pulse 87 audience had grown accustomed to. It was a hip-hop based format, with some dance music, but mostly nostalgic 1980s and 1990s rhythmic hits and current R&B and hip-hop. The studios and programming originated on Long Island, while WNYZ served as a simulcast to WPTY. Pulse 87's audience, which had grown to over 1 million listeners per week before they went off the air, eventually stopped tuning in, and the inability of many potential listeners in the New York area to tune into the 87.7 signal made the simulcast unprofitable for JVC Broadcasting. On January 21, 2010, WPTY stopped simulcasting on WNYZ-LP. Island Broadcasting let the signal go silent for one day and then began playing dance music for two hours the next morning. Due to a non-compete agreement, Island Broadcasting was not allowed to broadcast the dance music. Later in the day, a filler format of jazz and blues standards with station identification aired until January 27, 2010.

=== 2010 ===
The station implemented an independent music format on its audio channel known as the "Indie Darkroom".

On March 21, 2010, the station announced that Indie Darkroom would soon be relegated to the overnight hours on weekends. During other hours of Saturdays and Sundays, the station became "CaribStar 87.7FM".

On March 31, 2010, the station added Russian language programming "Danu Radio", (a successor of "Radio Vsyo").

On May 2, 2010, the station began airing Hindi-language programming on Sunday mornings.

On July 25, 2010, the station began airing Korean programing simulcast from WWRU in Jersey City.

The station's transmitter is located at One Court Square in Long Island City, Queens.

== Accidental license cancellation ==
On June 29, 2011, the FCC canceled the license of WNYZ-LP and deleted its call sign; the station had filed an extension for its construction permit (CP) for its digital facilities, after the original CP had expired. According to FCC regulations, a CP extension could only be filed only if the current CP is still valid. The cancellation was eventually undone due to the action being a mistake on the FCC's part. The FCC had meant to only deny the digital CP extension, not revoke the analog one as they had done. The station's license was renewed in 2015 for an eight-year term.

== Analog-to-digital conversion ==
All low power and translator television stations were required to shut down all analog television transmission by July 13, 2021. The station had construction permits to build its digital television transmitter. The station ended its programing on July 13, 2021, at 11:14 p.m. as part of the FCC mandated shutdown, permanently shutting down its transmitters just hours later. NY Radio Korea announced that the radio service would continue to be aired on other radio stations, including WVIP via HD Radio, WVIP's translator station W268BY at 101.5 FM in Queens, as well as on other digital services. WNYZ-LP became the last analog television station to sign off in the New York metropolitan area.

The station began working on converting into a digital transmission in September 2021. On October 22, 2021, WNYZ-LP returned to the air with a new digital transmitter (the station had delays in receiving the equipment due to the COVID-19 pandemic). On January 28, 2022, WNYZ-LP changed its call sign to WNYZ-LD. On July 20, 2023, an FCC "Report and Order" included this station as one of 13 "FM6" stations allowed to continue to operate an FM radio broadcast, as a "ancillary or supplementary" service. Due to WVIP being sold to a religious broadcaster, WNYZ-LD moved its simulcast to WXBK-HD3.

== Subchannel ==
Subchannels of WNYZ-LD
Subchannel	Res.	Short name	Programming
6.1	720p	WNYZ	Korean programming
