= ATSC 3.0 =

Next-generation TV standard based on ATSC

ATSC 3.0 is a major version of the ATSC standards for terrestrial television broadcasting created by the Advanced Television Systems Committee (ATSC).

The standards are designed to offer support for newer technologies, including High Efficiency Video Coding (HEVC) for video channels of up to 4K resolution (2160p) at 120 frames per second, wide color gamut, high dynamic range, Dolby AC-4 and MPEG-H 3D Audio, datacasting capabilities, and more robust mobile television support. The capabilities have also been foreseen as a way to enable finer public alerting and targeted advertising.

The first major deployment of ATSC 3.0 occurred in South Korea in May 2017, in preparation for the 2018 Winter Olympics. In November 2017, the FCC passed rules allowing American broadcast stations to voluntarily adopt ATSC 3.0 ("Next Gen TV"), provided that full-power stations preserve the availability of their programming in their city of license via legacy ATSC signals; adoption is being steered by the broadcasting industry, without a mandatory transition as there was from analog NTSC to ATSC. Other adoptions have since occurred in Jamaica and Trinidad and Tobago (which are both transitioning from analog television), and Brazil ("DTV+", which is succeeding ISDB-T International).

== Technical details ==
=== Bootstrap ===
ATSC 3.0 uses a bootstrap signal which allows a receiver to discover and identify the signals that are being transmitted. The bootstrap signal has a fixed configuration that can allow for new signal types to be used in the future. The bootstrap signal can also carry information to wake up a receiver so that it can receive an emergency population warning.

=== Physical layer ===
ATSC 3.0 uses a highly efficient physical layer that is based on orthogonal frequency-division multiplexing (OFDM) modulation with low-density parity-check code (LDPC) forward error correction (FEC). With a 6 MHz channel, the bit rate can vary from 1 to 57 Mbit/s depending on the parameters that are used. ATSC 3.0 is limited to 64 physical layer pipes (PLP) with a recommended 4 simultaneous PLPs per complete delivered product. The PLPs in a channel may each have different robustness levels. An example of how PLPs can be used would be a channel that delivers HD video over a robust PLP and enhances the video to UHD with a Scalable HEVC layer over a higher-bitrate PLP.

=== Audio ===
ATSC 3.0 supports Dolby AC-4 and MPEG-H 3D Audio.

=== Video ===
ATSC 3.0 supports three video formats: legacy SD video, interlaced HD video, and progressive video. Legacy SD Video and Interlaced HD Video support frame rates up to 30 fps. Legacy SD Video and Interlaced HD Video are included for compatibility with existing content and can't use HDR, HFR, or WCG.

==== Legacy SD video ====
Legacy SD video supports resolutions up to 720×480 and supports HEVC Main 10 profile at Level 3.1 Main Tier.

==== Interlaced HD video ====
Interlaced HD video supports 1080-line interlaced video with 1,920 or 1,440 pixels per line, and supports HEVC Main 10 profile at Level 4.1 Main Tier.

==== Progressive video ====
Progressive video supports resolutions up to 3840×2160 progressive scan and supports HEVC Main 10 profile at Level 5.2 Main Tier. Progressive video supports frame rates up to 120 fps and the Rec. 2020 color space. Progressive video supports HDR using hybrid log–gamma (HLG) and perceptual quantizer (PQ) transfer functions.

=== Security ===
ATSC 3.0 supports encryption of the signal to protect against intrusion and provide digital rights management (DRM). While tuner vendor Nuvyyo stated in 2017 that this was intended "to allow broadcasters to provide value-added services like on-demand and pay-per-view content on a subscription basis" via broadcast signals, major U.S. broadcast groups began to encrypt their ATSC 3.0 broadcast signals in 2023.

ATSC 3.0 supports digital watermarking of the audio and video signals.

=== Public alerting ===
A U.S.-based coalition known as the Advanced Warning and Response Network Alliance (AWARN) has advocated for the use of ATSC 3.0 features, including datacasting and digital network interoperability, in order to provide an emergency alert system with support for embedded rich media and finer geotargeting.

In November 2021, AWARN and ATSC jointly filed comments in response to questions posed about ATSC 3.0 alerting capabilities in the FCC's Further Notice of Proposed Rulemaking as required by the National Defense Authorization Act for Fiscal Year 2021.

=== Broadcast Positioning System ===
A backup to GPS called Broadcast Positioning System (BPS) has been proposed as part of ATSC 3.0, to provide location services in broadcast areas in the event of GPS failure. This would use ATSC 3.0 to transmit timing signals terrestrially; the service could be deployed on existing infrastructure and would not be vulnerable to GPS jamming or spoofing.

=== Analog audio fallback ===
Unlike ATSC 1.0, ATSC 3.0 as defined makes possible the continued use of an analog audio subcarrier in addition to the digital signal—colloquially called a "Franken FM"—by narrowing the bandwidth of the channel to 5.5 MHz wide (ATSC 1.0 requires the full 6 MHz bandwidth). On June 10, 2021, the FCC granted KBKF-LD in San Jose, California, a special temporary authority (STA) to transmit an analog FM audio subcarrier at 87.75 MHz, the same frequency as what would be the audio subcarrier on an NTSC analog video signal. KBKF-LD's sister station WRME-LD was granted a similar special temporary authority shortly before the end of low-power analog television on July 13, 2021. The STA has implications for the dozens of remaining analog low-power television stations on physical channel 6, which operate as FM radio stations using that NTSC subcarrier and face a July 13 deadline to convert to digital; a digital signal is not compatible with standard FM radio nor with the American digital radio standard, HD Radio. KBKF must report any interference issues to the FCC twice during the STA's term, once at 90 days and again at 180 days. The initial 90-day filings demonstrated that the shared channel space was a success. The FCC has proposed as of July 2023 that those operating under STA would continue to be allowed to use the analog audio service under a grandfather clause but would disallow the addition of analog audio to any other television licenses.

== History ==
On March 26, 2013, the Advanced Television Systems Committee announced a call for proposals for the ATSC 3.0 physical layer which states that the plan is for the system to support video with a resolution of 3840×2160 at 60 fps (4K UHDTV).

In February 2014, a channel-sharing trial began between Los Angeles television stations KLCS (a public television station that is a PBS member) and KJLA, a commercial ethnic broadcaster owned-and-operated by LATV, with support from the CTIA and approval of the Federal Communications Commission. The test involved multiplexing multiple HD and SD subchannels together, experimenting with both current MPEG-2/H.262 and MPEG-4 AVC/H.264 video codecs. Ultimately, it has been decided that H.264 would not be considered for ATSC-3.0, but rather the newer MPEG-H HEVC/H.265 codec would be used instead, with OFDM instead of 8VSB for modulation, allowing for data rates of 28 Mbit/s to 36 Mbit/s or more on a single 6 MHz channel.

In May 2015, and continuing on for six months afterward, the temporary digital transition transmitter and antenna of Cleveland, Ohio's Fox affiliate, WJW, was used by the National Association of Broadcasters (NAB) to test the "Futurecast" ATSC 3.0 standard advanced by LG Corporation and GatesAir. In September 2015 further tests in the Baltimore and Washington, D.C. area were announced by Sinclair Broadcast Group's Baltimore station, WBFF, which is also a Fox affiliate. The Futurecast system had previously been tested in October 2014 during off-air hours through Madison, Wisconsin ABC affiliate WKOW. Unlike ATSC 1.0/2.0's Distributed Transmission System's pseudo-single-frequency network operations, WI9XXT's two transmitters operate as a true Single-Frequency Network.

Further tests began on January 6, 2016, of ATSC 3.0 with high dynamic range (using the Scalable HEVC video codec with HE-AAC audio) from Las Vegas independent station, KHMP-LD on UHF 18. It would later be joined in these tests by Sinclair's CW affiliate, KVCW simulcasting on a temporary test frequency (UHF 45).

On January 20, 2016, a working group in South Korea led by LG Electronics and others performed the first "end-to-end" broadcast of 4K resolution programming via an ATSC 3.0 signal, using an IP transmission from the Seoul Broadcasting System's Mok-dong studio to feed a transmitter on Gwanak Mountain. The broadcaster's technical director stated that the successful test "highlights the potential for Korea's launch of terrestrial UHD TV commercial services using ATSC 3.0 in February 2017." Following the test broadcast, South Korean broadcasters announced that they planned to launch ATSC 3.0 services in February 2017.

On March 28, 2016, the bootstrap component of ATSC 3.0 (System Discovery and Signalling) was upgraded from candidate standard to finalized standard.

On June 29, 2016, NBC affiliate WRAL-TV in Raleigh, North Carolina, a station known for its pioneering roles in testing the original ATSC standards, launched an experimental ATSC 3.0 channel carrying the station's programming in 1080p, as well as a 4K demo loop. WRAL-EX has also carried 4K coverage of the 2016 Summer Olympics and 2018 Winter Olympics in an experimental manner.

== Comparison with 5G Broadcast ==
In comparison with 5G Broadcast, the IP-based broadcasting standard based on LTE, ATSC 3.0 has been praised for significantly higher bandwidth efficiency, and the presence of a future-proofing "bootstrap" signal to enable the introduction of new physical-level modulation profiles. However, 5G Broadcast was seen as having the advantage in most other aspects of performance.

== Countries and territories using ATSC 3.0 ==
=== Brazil ===
In January 2022, the Fórum Sistema Brasileiro TV Digital Terrestre recommended the adoption of key ATSC 3.0 technologies as part of its "TV 3.0" standards for next-generation digital terrestrial television in Brazil, which will replace the Japanese ISDB-T International standards. Terrestrial television has a major presence in the country, with 88% of families surveyed by the Brazilian Institute of Geography and Statistics (IBGE) stating that they receive terrestrial television at home.

In August 2025, TV 3.0 was officially adopted as "DTV+", with experimental services beginning in São Paulo and Rio de Janeiro. In March 2026, a revised deadline of 2027 was set for the national deployment. TV Globo—Brazil's largest network—announced plans to deploy commercial DTV+ services for its telecasts of the 2026 FIFA World Cup; these services are deployed on VHF Band III.

=== Canada ===
In 2022, an experimental station using ATSC 3.0 was launched in the Toronto area by Humber Polytechnic under the call sign VBA257.

=== Jamaica ===
In December 2021, the Jamaica Broadcasting Commission established that Jamaica would adopt ATSC 3.0 as part of the country's transition from analog to digital television, with the transition expected to be completed in 2023. Television Jamaica concurrently joined the ATSC as its first full member from the Caribbean.

On January 31, 2022, Television Jamaica launched their first ATSC 3.0 transmitter in Kingston, making Jamaica the first country in the Caribbean and the third country in the world to launch ATSC 3.0 broadcasting. A second transmitter in Montego Bay was activated in July 2022.

=== South Korea ===
On July 27, 2016, South Korea's Ministry of Science, ICT and Future Planning officially endorsed ATSC 3.0 as the country's broadcasting standard for ultra-high-definition television. On January 6, 2017, LG Electronics announced that their 2017 4K TVs sold in South Korea would include ATSC 3.0 tuners.

On May 31, 2017, SBS, MBC, and KBS officially launched their full-time ATSC 3.0 services in major South Korean markets such as Seoul and Incheon. The launch had been delayed from February 2017 due to issues obtaining the required equipment.

The transition made South Korea the first country in the world to deploy a terrestrial UHD format, and enabled 4K broadcasts of the 2018 Winter Olympics in Pyeongchang County.

=== Trinidad and Tobago ===
In January 2023, the Telecommunications Authority of Trinidad and Tobago (TATT) announced that Trinidad and Tobago would adopt ATSC 3.0 as part of the nation's transition from analog to digital television, with the transition expected to be completed in 2026.

=== United States ===
On February 2, 2017, the FCC issued a notice of proposed rulemaking (NPRM) to allow the deployment of ATSC 3.0 in the United States, seeking comment on issues such as carriage obligations, interference, public interest obligations, simulcasting, and a tuner mandate. Gary Shapiro of the Consumer Technology Association (CTA) has stated that a TV tuner mandate is not necessary and that it should be market-driven and voluntary. On February 24, 2017, the FCC voted unanimously to approve two portions of the NPRM, opening the door for manufacturers to begin producing ATSC 3.0 hardware.

On November 14, 2017, the Pearl consortium (comprising a number of major broadcasting conglomerates, including Cox Media Group, Graham Media Group, Hearst Television, Gray Television, Nexstar Media Group, E. W. Scripps Company, and Tegna Inc.) announced that it would use Phoenix, Arizona as a test market for an ATSC 3.0 transition in 2018. Two days later, the FCC voted 3–2 in favor of an order authorizing voluntary deployments of ATSC 3.0 (referred to under the branding "Next Gen TV"); stations that choose to deploy ATSC 3.0 services must continue to maintain an ATSC 1.0-compatible signal that is "substantially similar" in programming to their ATSC 3.0 signal (besides programming that leverages ATSC 3.0 features, and advertising), and covers the station's entire community of license (the FCC stated that it would expedite approval for transitions if the loss in over-the-air coverage post-transition is 5% or less). This clause will remain in effect for at least five years; permission from the FCC must be obtained before a full-power station can shut down its ATSC signal, but low-power stations are exempt from the simulcasting requirement and are allowed to flash-cut to ATSC 3.0 if they choose.

ATSC 1.0 signals will still be subject to mandatory carriage rules for television providers during the five-year simulcasting mandate; the FCC stated that voluntary carriage of 3.0 signals by television providers would be left to the marketplace. The order does require stations to provide sufficient on-air notice about transitions to ATSC 3.0 services. The FCC will not allocate a second channel to each broadcaster to enable a gradual consumer transition. Instead, it has been suggested that multiple broadcasters in each market cooperate by locating multiple degraded ATSC 1.0 services on a single transmitter. At the same time, the broadcasters would share the remaining transmitters for ATSC 3.0 transmissions. After sufficient consumer adoption, ATSC 1.0 transmissions would be abandoned, allowing stations to return to operation on their owned transmitters. It is unclear how the complications of this approach would be overcome, especially in light of spectrum reallocation in heavily populated markets.

The FCC published its final rules on ATSC 3.0 to the Federal Register on February 2, 2018, and they formally took effect 30 days afterward. As the transition is voluntary, the FCC will not require ATSC 3.0 tuners to be included in new televisions, and there will not be a subsidy program for the distribution of ATSC 3.0-compatible equipment. American Television Alliance (ATA)—a consortium of U.S. television providers—criticized the "voluntary" transition, inconsistencies in commitments to simulcasting arrangements for compatibility, and potential downgrades in service for ATSC 1.0 viewers, as well as how these signals will factor into retransmission consent negotiations. It has been suggested that ATSC 1.0 lighthouses using MPEG-4 encoding could allow for more channels to be carried on lighthouse signals and at up to 1080p resolution, while maintaining a level of backward compatibility with existing televisions and tuners. However, not all televisions and decoder boxes—particularly earlier models—support MPEG-4 video on ATSC 1.0 signals.

"NextGen TV" brand logo used on ATSC 3.0 compatible products sold in the United States

As part of the ATSC 3.0 trials by Pearl, Univision's KFPH-CD in Phoenix was converted to an ATSC 3.0 station on April 9, 2018, which will be shared by Univision and several other broadcasters. Univision and Sinclair Broadcast Group were also planning a trial in Dallas, which would utilize spectrum vacated by KSTR-DT and KTXD-TV to test ATSC 3.0 transmission using a single-frequency network. On September 26, 2019, the CTA announced that it would use the certification mark "NextGen TV" (stylized "NEXTGEN TV") to promote equipment that is compliant with the ATSC 3.0 standard. The major network affiliates in Las Vegas became the first to launch permanent ATSC 3.0 signals on May 26, 2020.

Due to the nature of FCC regulatory requirements, early ATSC 3.0 "lighthouse" stations involved sharing agreements with major station ownership groups such as Nexstar, Sinclair, Scripps, and Tegna, and did not engage public television stations and independent broadcasters. For example, the Buffalo launch of ATSC 3.0 left out PBS member station WNED-TV and independent station WBBZ-TV. In December 2021, Pearl TV would partner with a public television station as host for the first time, announcing a partnership with the historically black Howard University in Washington, D.C. and its PBS station WHUT-TV; the university had worked with the NAB on seminars discussing ATSC 3.0, and the university had been developing ATSC 3.0-based distance learning platforms using its datacasting functionality.

Consumer adoption of ATSC 3.0 has been slow, hindered primarily by many television manufacturers reserving built-in ATSC 3.0 tuners for high-end models (if at all), lukewarm interest in ATSC 3.0's interactive capabilities, and greater interest among consumers in streaming platforms offering equivalent functionality. Nevertheless, in February 2025 the NAB filed a petition with the FCC proposing a two-stage mandatory transition, beginning with most stations within the top 55 media markets in February 2028, and the remainder by February 2030. The NAB estimated that service was available to approximately 75% of the U.S. population across over 80 media markets, and that ATSC 3.0 tuners were available in 10% of the new TVs shipped in 2024.

CTA CEO Gary Shapiro criticized the proposal, stating that a mandatory transition would "impose [a] large percentage increase in costs at a time when the TV set has proved to be the rare deflationary product." The digital rights advocacy group Electronic Frontier Foundation (EFF) also opposed the proposal, arguing that ATSC 3.0's encryption and DRM functions made it "a transition from the century-old system of universally accessible programming to a privately controlled web of proprietary technological restrictions."

== Legal issues ==
=== Privacy ===
U.S. consumer advocates have noted the opportunity which ATSC 3.0 provides to advertisers to run targeted advertising. The targeted ads would allow advertisers to track viewer ratings more directly rather than indirectly by companies such as Nielsen Media Research. The FCC is expected to defer the decision on targeted ads to be in accordance with Federal Trade Commission's guidelines on privacy.

=== DRM ===
The ability to encrypt over-the-air signals has faced criticism for contradicting the concept of free-to-air television, and potentially hindering digital video recorders and place shifting products via restrictions imposed by broadcasters.

=== Patent litigation ===
In October 2023, LG Electronics announced that it would no longer include ATSC 3.0 tuners in its U.S. products beginning in the 2024 model year, after the United States District Court for the Eastern District of Texas ruled that the company had violated patents owned by Constellation Design, Inc. (which is not a member of ATSC) related to non-uniform constellation (NUC) techniques used by the standard, and was ordered to pay $1.68 million in damages. The ATSC stated that the impact of the situation was "likely very limited".

== See also ==
- ATSC tuner
- High Efficiency Video Coding
