= KCWE =

Television station in Kansas City, Missouri

- Kansas City, Missouri; United States
- Channels: Digital: 31 (UHF); Virtual: 29
- Branding: KCWE

Programming
- Affiliations: 29.1: The CW; for others, see § Subchannels

Ownership
- Owner: Hearst Television; (Hearst Stations Inc.)
- Sister stations: KMBC-TV

History
- First air date: September 14, 1996
- Former call signs: KCWB (1996–1998)
- Former channel numbers: Analog: 29 (UHF, 1996–2008)
- Former affiliations: The WB (1996–March 1998); UPN (March 1998–2006)
- Call sign meaning: Changed from KCWB when station lost WB affiliation in 1998

Technical information
- Licensing authority: FCC
- Facility ID: 64444
- ERP: 1,000 kW
- HAAT: 332 m (1,089 ft)
- Transmitter coordinates: 39°5′1″N 94°30′58″W

Links
- Public license information: Public file; LMS
- Website: www.kmbc.com/kcwetv

KCWE (channel 29) is a television station in Kansas City, Missouri, United States, affiliated with The CW. It is owned by Hearst Television alongside ABC affiliate KMBC-TV (channel 9). The two stations share studios on Winchester Avenue in the Ridge-Winchester section of Kansas City, Missouri; KCWE's transmitter is located in the city's Blue Valley section.

Originally proposed for channel 32, channel 29 went on the air in September 1996 as KCWB, Kansas City's first local affiliate of The WB. It was owned by a group of Kansas City and television investors, who subcontracted its operation to KMBC-TV under a local marketing agreement. KMBC and KCWB split over-the-air rights to Kansas City Royals baseball from 1996 to 2002. KCWB lost the WB affiliation in March 1998 after a group deal saw it move to KSMO-TV (channel 62). The station then picked up UPN, which had gone without local coverage for two months, and changed its call sign to KCWE.

In 2006, Hearst purchased KCWE outright, and the station became the local affiliate for The CW, formed when the UPN and WB networks merged. The station introduced morning and evening newscasts from KMBC-TV in 2008 and 2010, respectively.

== History ==
=== KCWB: Construction and WB affiliation ===
What became KCWE first came into view in 1986 when applicants filed for channel 32. Thaddeus Bishop was the first to file on October 17, and by the deadline in December, 15 groups had applied. One of the applicants in the field was KZKC (channel 62), which filed to investigate the possibility of moving to a lower channel number. KZKC was one of the fourteen applicants to be designated for comparative hearing by the Federal Communications Commission (FCC) in April 1987.

FCC administrative law judge Joseph P. Gonzalez issued an initial decision among six remaining applicants in March 1990. He dismissed KZKC and another applicant, Mid-Continent Communications, over failure to provide significant coverage. Channel 32 Broadcasting Company and T.V. 32, Inc.—controlled by Robert P. Liepold—were the finalists. T.V. 32, Inc. won on the basis of its proposal to cover more people. The FCC review board upheld the decision in December.

Running out of money and time, Liepold put the permit on the market in 1995. After 50 potential investors turned down the prospect of financing the station's construction, the leading buyer was Quincy Jones Entertainment, a partnership with David Salzman that already owned WNOL-TV in New Orleans. Most industry sources speculated that one of Kansas City's existing stations would program channel 32 under a local marketing agreement, with Hearst Corporation–owned KMBC-TV (channel 9) particularly mentioned, and that it would affiliate with The WB, a new network whose programs were only seen on cable in the Kansas City market.

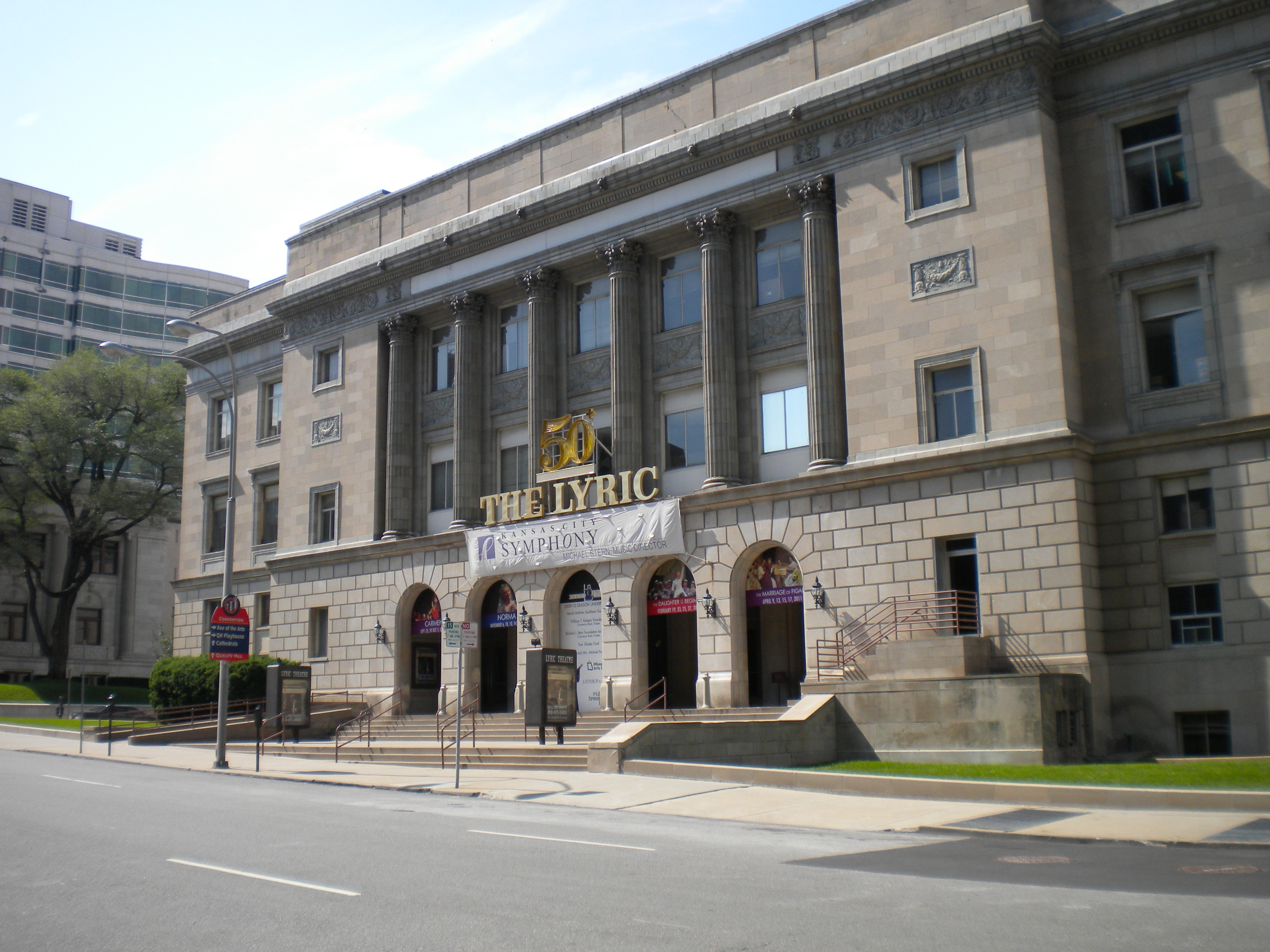
KCWB/KCWE operated from the Lyric Theatre building from 1996 to 2007.

After changing from channel 32 to channel 29, the station signed on as KCWB on September 14, 1996. It originated from KMBC-TV's studios in the Lyric Theatre building at 11th Street and Central Avenue, and its program schedule consisted of WB network and syndicated shows. A month after launching, KMBC and KCWB obtained rights to Kansas City Royals baseball in a 50-game agreement sublicensed from Fox Sports Rocky Mountain; 35 games were slated for airing on channel 29.

=== Switch to UPN ===
KCWB had been on the air less than a year when Sinclair Broadcast Group, owner of Kansas City UPN affiliate KSMO-TV (channel 62), signed a long-term affiliation agreement with Time Warner in July 1997, under which the group committed five of its UPN-affiliated stations to The WB in 1998, with a sixth independent station to join in 1999. KSMO-TV was not among the defecting stations and was one of six Sinclair-controlled outlets that would remain with UPN; however, the high-profile move by Sinclair to move five stations from UPN to The WB, its direct competitor, led to a legal dispute between the companies. UPN sued Sinclair, alleging it had breached its affiliation contract by exiting it early. At the end of December, Sinclair announced that KSMO would exit the network when its affiliation agreement ended on January 16, 1998; even as reports surfaced of renewed talks between Sinclair and UPN, KSMO became independent. UPN was left without a Kansas City affiliate for more than a month, but by late February, all signs pointed to KCWB taking on the UPN affiliation as KSMO negotiated with The WB. KCWB beat out KMCI-TV (channel 38) for the UPN affiliation, setting up a switch on March 30, 1998; Kids' WB did not immediately move from channel 29 because of a pre-existing commitment by channel 62 to air Fox Kids, with those blocks instead swapping stations later in the year. To reflect the change of affiliation, KCWB changed its call sign to KCWE.

Liepold and Thomas B. Jones sold their stock in KCWE to Sonia and David Salzman in 1999. The station's relationship with the Royals ended after the 2002 season, ahead of the team starting the Royals Sports Television Network and sublicensing games to KMCI-TV in 2003; the team's poor on-field performance had caused ratings to decline. Hearst-Argyle Television continued to operate KCWE for its original ownership, which agreed to sell it to Hearst-Argyle in 2005 for $10.96 million. The transaction received FCC approval on August 15, 2006. This created Kansas City's third outright duopoly alongside KSHB–KMCI and KCTV–KSMO.

=== CW affiliation ===
On January 24, 2006, The WB and UPN announced their merger into The CW, effective that September. KCWE beat out KMCI and KSMO, the latter of which decided the new network would not fit its business plan, and agreed to affiliate with The CW in early March.

In 2007, KMBC and KCWE moved from the downtown studios into a 53,000-square-foot (4,900 m^{2}) facility at the Winchester Business Center (located at 6455 Winchester Avenue, near Swope Park) in southeastern Kansas City, Missouri. The facility, five years in the planning and under construction since 2005, enabled the KMBC–KCWE operation to operate more efficiently. Prior to the relocation, offices spilled out from the Lyric Theatre into an annex across the street.

== Local programming ==
=== Newscasts ===
Despite being operated by KMBC, KCWB/KCWE did not air any local newscasts until March 3, 2008, with the debut of KMBC 9 FirstNews on KCWE, a morning newscast extension which airs weekdays from 7 to 9 a.m. In 2010, the station debuted a half-hour 9 p.m. newscast, seven nights a week; the weeknight editions were expanded to an hour in 2016. A noon newscast was added in September 2020.

=== Sports programming ===
On February 6, 2010, Hearst Television announced a broadcasting agreement with the Kansas City Wizards of Major League Soccer, with KCWE securing the local broadcast television rights to regular-season matches that were not broadcast nationally beginning with the team's 2010 season. The team rebranded as Sporting Kansas City the next season. KMCI-TV took over the local television rights to the club beginning with the team's 2014 season.

== Technical information ==
=== Subchannels ===
KCWE's transmitter is located in the Blue Valley section of Kansas City. The station's signal is multiplexed:

Subchannels of KCWE
Subchannel	Res.	Short name	Programming
29.1	1080i	KCWE-HD	The CW
29.2	480i	TCN	True Crime Network
29.4	480i	HSN	HSN
62.4	480i	Cozi TV	Cozi TV (KSMO-TV)
62.5	480i	Comet	Comet (KSMO-TV)

Broadcast on behalf of another station

=== Analog-to-digital conversion ===
KCWE signed on its digital signal on UHF channel 31 on May 1, 2002. The station shut down its analog signal on December 15, 2008—two months before the originally scheduled date of February 17, 2009, for full-power stations to transition from analog to digital broadcasts—in order to accommodate the move of KMBC-TV's digital signal to channel 29. The station's digital signal remained on its pre-transition UHF channel 31, using virtual channel 29.
