= KSMO-TV =

Television station in Kansas City, Missouri

ATSC 3.0 station
- Kansas City, Missouri; United States
- City: Kansas City, Missouri
- Channels: Digital: 32 (UHF); Virtual: 62
- Branding: KSMO-TV

Programming
- Affiliations: 62.1: Independent with MyNetworkTV; for others, see § Technical information and subchannels

Ownership
- Owner: Gray Media; (Gray Television Licensee, LLC)
- Sister stations: KCTV

History
- First air date: December 7, 1983
- Former call signs: KEKR-TV (1983–1985); KZKC-TV (1985–1986); KZKC (1986–1991)
- Former channel numbers: Analog: 62 (UHF, 1983–2009); Digital: 47 (UHF, until 2019)
- Former affiliations: Independent (1983–1995, January–March 1998); Fox Kids (secondary, 1994–1998); UPN (1995–1998); The WB (1998–2006)
- Call sign meaning: Postal abbreviations of Kansas and Missouri

Technical information
- Licensing authority: FCC
- Facility ID: 33336
- ERP: 750 kW
- HAAT: 358 m (1,175 ft)
- Transmitter coordinates: 39°5′25.8″N 94°28′19.2″W

Links
- Public license information: Public file; LMS

KSMO-TV (channel 62) is an independent television station in Kansas City, Missouri, United States, which has a secondary affiliation with MyNetworkTV. It is owned by Gray Media alongside CBS affiliate KCTV (channel 5). The two stations share studios on Shawnee Mission Parkway in Fairway, Kansas; KSMO-TV's transmitter is located in Independence, Missouri.

Channel 62 in Kansas City began broadcasting as KEKR-TV in 1983, changing its call letters to KZKC in 1985. Originally owned by Media Central of Chattanooga, Tennessee, it suffered for most of its first decade on air from a management style more suited to stations in smaller markets, inferior programming, and a poor reputation. In 1988, the station was fined for airing an indecent film in prime time, attracting national attention. Financial issues also strapped KZKC, particularly after Media Central entered bankruptcy reorganization in 1987.

KZKC was sold out of bankruptcy to First American National Bank of Nashville, Tennessee, in early 1990; the bank quickly sold the station to ABRY Communications. ABRY instituted a top-to-bottom overhaul of programming and facilities, changing the call letters to KSMO-TV in April 1991. The relaunched channel 62 cemented itself as the primary sports and children's station in Kansas City; from 1990 to 1995, viewership tripled and advertising revenue quadrupled. ABRY affiliated the station with UPN upon its January 1995 debut. The station also was the broadcast home of Kansas City Royals baseball for four years, further increasing its visibility.

Sinclair Broadcast Group exercised an option to buy KSMO-TV in December 1995. The station dropped UPN in January 1998 after a corporate dispute between Sinclair and the network; two months later, the station became the new Kansas City affiliate of The WB. With the company focusing on duopolies elsewhere and unable to buy a second station in Kansas City, Sinclair sold KSMO-TV to the Meredith Corporation, then-owner of KCTV, in 2005 after Meredith assumed operating control the year before. The station affiliated with MyNetworkTV upon the merger of UPN and The WB into The CW in 2006, and it also added newscasts from KCTV and other local programming to its lineup. Gray acquired Meredith in 2021, the same year that the station converted to ATSC 3.0 (NextGen TV) broadcasting.

== History ==
=== KEKR-TV: Construction and launch ===
Several applications had been made for channel 62 in Kansas City in the late 1960s, including by Dick Bailey and TVue Associates, but interest around the channel allocation started in earnest at the end of the 1970s, as several business ventures around the country analyzed using unused UHF channels in major cities to broadcast subscription television (STV) programming. In 1977, Buford Television of Tyler, Texas, and SelecTV of Kansas City, Inc., both made applications to the Federal Communications Commission (FCC) seeking to establish channel 62 in Kansas City and use it to broadcast STV to paying subscribers, even though Kansas City had an area-wide cable system.

You can build a two-bit Mickey Mouse station in Cape Girardeau, and it will be OK. You can't do that in Kansas City.

— Gary Liebling, KEKR-TV's first engineering manager

After reaching a settlement with Buford that gave it the right to buy stock in SelecTV of Kansas City, that company was granted the construction permit on April 8, 1981, but channel 62 continued to sit unbuilt for more than two years. The permittee changed its name from SelecTV of Kansas City to Choice Channel of Kansas City in 1982, a year in which Kansas City and its metropolitan area were wired for cable at an accelerated pace and the national economic picture for STV began to sour. Choice Channel of Kansas City then took on a new majority investor: Media Central Inc. of Chattanooga, Tennessee, which purchased a 60 percent interest in the station in February 1983. With Media Central on board, consideration of STV service was dropped and an agreement reached to co-locate its transmitting facility with public television station KCPT. Media Central used modular construction methods: studio equipment was assembled in Chattanooga before being shipped to Kansas City for installation once the studio facility was completed. However, its construction methods ultimately resulted in subpar equipment and poorer reception; at one time, the station volunteered to send repairmen to homes experiencing difficulty tuning it in. In a January 1988 article in Channels magazine, a former station employee was quoted as saying that the high school in Shawnee Mission, Kansas, had better equipment than channel 62, though Media Central's corporate office in Chattanooga did have high-quality equipment.

KEKR-TV—whose call letters represented an attorney who helped file for the license—debuted on December 7, 1983, from studios in Blue Summit. It was the first new station in Kansas City since KYFC-TV, a Christian television station, began in 1978, and it was the first new general-entertainment independent since KSHB-TV went on the air as KBMA-TV in 1970. Programming consisted primarily of classic reruns, as well as a handful of first-run and new shows in the Kansas City area and Big Eight Conference college basketball. The station, however, was far from an immediate success. In its first year on air, it attracted just three percent of the Kansas City viewing audience, well below the six to eight percent its founding program director had set as a goal. The station's lone bright spot was that it was drawing young people to watch cartoons in mornings and afternoons. A new general manager, Steve Friedheim, was appointed in a management shakeup; when he attempted to gather public feedback, he found that nobody had heard of his station. Three of his colleagues at his former employer, independent station WNOL-TV in New Orleans, followed him to Kansas City amid turmoil at the New Orleans station.

=== KZKC: Revamp and indecency dispute ===
After a year, Media Central sought to turn the ailing station around by spending more money on programming and overhauling its image. In January 1985, the station changed its call sign to KZKC-TV, having decided not to purchase the designation KCKC from a radio station in California. The new call sign did attract attention—from KCTV, the Kansas City CBS affiliate, which sued channel 62 a month after it made the change, citing a potential likelihood of confusion. The lawsuit was heard by a federal judge in June 1986, and the judge ordered KZKC-TV to simply become KZKC without the suffix. In another fruitless attempt to improve its image, the station filed for channel 32 when the FCC made it available in Kansas City; however, with multiple applicants proposing new stations in the market, an FCC administrative law judge ruled against its bid in 1991 and in favor of another group.

One way the station tried to attract interest was its policy to only edit films where there were explicit sexual acts, leading to occasional shots of nudity. On May 26, 1987, even after announcing it would start censoring frontal nudity the year before, KZKC aired the 1981 comedy-drama film Private Lessons, known for its frontal nudity and a plot involving a relationship between a high school student and a maid, in prime time. Acting on a viewer complaint, the FCC opened an investigation into the station's broadcast of the film in January 1988, with possible sanctions including a formal reprimand, a fine, or even revocation of the station's broadcast license. The case shed light on the practice of "stacking" titillating movies for ratings sweeps periods several times a year, a practice followed throughout Media Central's eight-station chain of independents.

The FCC—operating with just three of five commissioners at the time—unanimously agreed the material was obscene and, on a 2–1 vote, fined KZKC $2,000 in June 1988. The fine represented the first punishment of a television station for airing obscene programming. Media Central chairman Morton Kent called the fine "outrageous" and declared to Dennis McDougal of the Los Angeles Times that he would not pay. However, the commission rescinded the fine in 1989 after a court ruling overturned changes to its "safe harbor" for indecent programming.

By the time of the indecency investigation, Media Central had filed for Chapter 11 bankruptcy reorganization; in July 1987, the parent company and its eight stations—KZKC initially the lone exception—presented petitions for reorganization. The firm had $68 million in assets but owed $50 million to creditors, including program suppliers; KZKC's reorganization plan stated that paying off its debts could take 10 years. The station's front office urged general manager Friedheim to barter advertising for goods and services wherever possible to save money. The disposition of the company's stations lasted three years. Only in March 1989 did a Chattanooga bankruptcy court begin considering plans to sell some of the Media Central stations, eventually approving a purchase of KZKC by one of Media Central's creditors, First American National Bank of Nashville, Tennessee. First American then contracted Act III Broadcasting, an Atlanta-based company with significant operations in Nashville, to run the station. This was heavily delayed by appeals in federal court. While that went on, Steve Engles—who then left when his bid to purchase Media Central-owned KBSI in Cape Girardeau was approved—improved KZKC's programming, signal, and on-air look.

=== KSMO-TV: The independent rebuild ===
On February 7, 1990, a subsidiary of First American National Bank received KZKC's license, with Act III taking over management duties. This was a short-term solution; Act III's contract precluded it from buying KZKC, and Act III president Bert Ellis noted that the bank was interested in selling. Two and a half months later, the bank filed to sell the station to ABRY Communications. ABRY, which owned two independent stations in Baltimore and Cincinnati, promised to spend millions of dollars to replace the transmitting facility and purchase new movies for air on the station. Additionally, the company announced it would move the station to new studios. Even before the sale closed, the station aimed to prepare for a major overhaul and to capitalize on KSHB-TV, its primary competitor, having an increasing obligation to Fox programs. It lured a series of college basketball broadcasts from channel 41 in part by having time to air Kansas and Kansas State coaches' shows.

Many major changes and a large promotion campaign were implemented in March and April 1991. A three-week "Your Vote Counts" campaign was begun in March; ballots were placed at points around the city to allow viewers to vote on programming, following a model ABRY had successfully used at its WNUV in Baltimore. The next month, the station relocated to the Cambridge Circle office park in Kansas City, Kansas, in studios that were twice the size of the Blue Summit facility built by Media Central; the program lineup was shuffled, a new antenna was installed, and a children's club known as "Crew 62" was started. The station also changed its call sign to KSMO-TV, incorporating the postal abbreviations for Kansas and Missouri; a radio station in Salem, Missouri, agreed to share, and the O also allowed the station to insert a check mark in its logo in a nod to the voting campaign. The outgoing KZKC call sign was labeled by Jim McDonald as "probably the worst call letters that any station in America could have chosen", being tough to say and hard to remember to the point that some people noted in Nielsen Media Research ratings diaries that they had watched programs which channel 62 carried but ascribed them to other local stations.

The ABRY overhaul brought KSMO-TV credibility it had previously lacked. The station made an intensive push to become the market's sports station, picking up rights packages including Kansas, Kansas State, Missouri, and UMKC basketball, Kansas City Blades hockey, and—starting in 1993—65 Kansas City Royals baseball games each year, which was more than longtime rightsholder WDAF-TV had ever carried in its 13-year relationship with the franchise. In its last year, WDAF-TV had especially strained to juggle the Royals and NBC programming: Johnny Carson's final nights of The Tonight Show and several NBA playoff games in 1992 were seen on a tape-delayed basis to accommodate baseball telecasts. To woo the Royals, the station telecast a baseball game between Kansas and Wichita State just to prove that it could commit to the sport. The changes paid off: in 1993, twice as many Kansas City TV viewers watched KSMO-TV for more than 15 minutes per month than had done so just three years prior. Its total market share was seven percent, far better than the three percent registered in May 1990, before the ABRY acquisition.

KSMO-TV also profited from a major change elsewhere in the Kansas City television market. As a result of a group affiliation agreement between Fox and New World Communications, the Fox affiliation moved from KSHB-TV to WDAF-TV in September 1994. WDAF-TV, however, did not take Fox Kids programming; the entire lineup moved to channel 62, making the station the only one in the market programming for kids and fueling large viewership increases, particularly in the early evening hours. This also left syndicators of children's TV shows desperate for their programs to air in Kansas City to have to accept less-than-ideal time slots for their programs: general manager Jim McDonald was offered $100,000 in advertising support to place a children's show on KSMO-TV's schedule before 6 a.m., and he described the challenge of accommodating Fox Kids, The Disney Afternoon, and the forthcoming UPN Kids as "fit[ting] so many ten-pound turnips into a five-pound sack".

Meanwhile, the Royals relationship grew somewhat strained midway through. In 1994, the national television rights to Major League Baseball moved to a new arrangement known as The Baseball Network, with games on ABC and NBC; this led to more nationally telecast games than the previous CBS national rights agreement. As a result, in June, KSMO-TV sued the Royals for breach of contract, objecting to having lost its exclusivity over Royals telecasts; the loss of prime-time games to The Baseball Network meant that the station's commitment to a minimum number of telecasts was filled by more day games. Further, the station charged in the suit that the ABC and NBC affiliates were charging less for advertisements in their Royals games than KSMO-TV. The lawsuit never went to trial and was settled out of court that December.

=== Sinclair ownership and affiliations with UPN and The WB ===
On January 16, 1995, KSMO-TV became the Kansas City charter affiliate of the United Paramount Network (UPN), which was created as a partnership between Paramount Television and Chris-Craft/United Television. KSMO-TV, the only available independent sought by two new networks—The WB and UPN—initially chose the latter on the strength of its primary attraction, Star Trek: Voyager. Sinclair Broadcast Group had acquired an option to buy KSMO-TV and WSTR-TV in Cincinnati from ABRY in 1994, after ABRY had sold most of its other TV properties to Sinclair; the Maryland-based broadcaster opted in December 1995 to purchase the station for $18 million. In ABRY's ownership tenure, spanning 1990 to 1995, viewership tripled and advertising revenue quadrupled to $17 million; because Sinclair's rate had been previously set, it significantly underpaid compared to an estimated value of $60 million for the station. The station continued to carry the Royals through 1996; however, due to UPN commitments, its game inventory dropped from 65 games in the first year of the contract to 53 games, the second-lowest exposure of any major-league franchise. In 1997, the Royals moved to an 80-game package, with 30 cable telecasts on Fox Sports Rocky Mountain and 50 games broadcast over-the-air. The broadcast rights to the package were won by KMBC-TV and KCWB (channel 29), an affiliate of The WB which KMBC-TV managed.

On July 21, 1997, Sinclair signed a long-term affiliation agreement with Time Warner, under which the group committed five of its UPN-affiliated stations to The WB in 1998, with a sixth independent station to join in 1999. KSMO-TV was not among the defecting stations and was one of six Sinclair-controlled outlets that would remain with UPN; in Kansas City, The WB had not had a broadcast affiliate until KCWB began broadcasting in 1996. However, the high-profile move by Sinclair to move five stations from UPN to The WB, its direct competitor, led to a legal dispute between the companies. UPN sued Sinclair, alleging it had breached its affiliation contract by exiting it early. At the end of December, Sinclair announced that KSMO would exit the network when its affiliation agreement ended on January 16, 1998. The station then became an independent again, even as reports surfaced of renewed talks between Sinclair and UPN. The network was left without a Kansas City affiliate for more than a month, but by late February, all signs pointed to KCWB taking on the UPN affiliation as KSMO negotiated with The WB. This occurred on March 30, 1998; Kids' WB did not immediately move from channel 29 because of the Fox Kids program commitment at channel 62, with those blocks instead swapping stations later in the year.

In the early 2000s, Sinclair laid the groundwork to introduce what would have been KSMO-TV's first local newscast, utilizing its News Central hybrid format. The station was approved to hire a news staff of two dozen; the newscast would feature local stories read by an anchor in Kansas City mixed with national segments from News Central's facility at Sinclair headquarters in Hunt Valley, Maryland.

=== The Meredith years: consolidation with KCTV, affiliation with MyNetworkTV ===
On November 12, 2004, the Meredith Corporation, owner of KCTV, announced that it would acquire the non-license assets of KSMO-TV from Sinclair for $26.8 million, immediately assuming responsibility for KSMO's advertising sales and administrative operations under a joint sales agreement. It also had an option to buy the station if FCC rules so approved for a further $6.7 million. Sinclair's decision to hand over sales and most other functions of KSMO-TV, with an option to sell it completely, was motivated by a corporate decision to focus on duopoly markets where it owned or could feasibly own two stations. It created the third such combination in Kansas City, alongside KSHB-TV with KMCI-TV and, indirectly, KMBC-TV with KCWE (the former KCWB). After the sale, KSMO-TV operations were moved to KCTV's offices in Fairway, Kansas.

Meredith then filed to buy KSMO-TV outright in January 2005, a transaction that would require a failing station waiver from the FCC as there would be fewer than eight unique owners of TV stations in the market. On the grounds that KSMO-TV's revenue and market share had steadily declined in the preceding five years, the commission granted the waiver in September 2005, approving the transaction.

On January 24, 2006, the respective parent companies of UPN and The WB—CBS Corporation and the Warner Bros. Entertainment division of Time Warner, announced that they would dissolve the two networks and create The CW Television Network, functionally a merger, beginning that fall. Even though KSMO-TV had placed fifth in total-day ratings at the time of the Meredith purchase, the company found that affiliation would not be financially viable and passed on The CW (which went to KCWE in early March); instead, the station affiliated with MyNetworkTV, set up by Fox Television Stations to serve former UPN and WB affiliates spurned in the merger.

In the late 2000s and early 2010s, KSMO experimented with a variety of local programs, including TeenStar, a weekly teen show co-produced with The Kansas City Star; weekly public affairs show Your Kansas City; bilingual Hispanic program Qué Pasa KC; film showcase CinemaKC; and high school football and Missouri Valley Conference and Mid-America Intercollegiate Athletic Association college sports. From 2011 to 2013, it was the television home of Sporting Kansas City soccer.

=== Sale to Gray Television ===
On May 3, 2021, Gray Television announced its intent to purchase the Meredith Local Media division, including KSMO and KCTV, for $2.7 billion. The sale was completed on December 1.

In 2025, KSMO-TV, as well as Gray-owned stations in the Kansas City Royals TV territory, broadcast 10 Sunday games simulcast with FanDuel Sports Network Kansas City, with KCTV airing at least six of the contests. KSMO also carries home games of the Kansas City Monarchs, an independent team in the American Association of Professional Baseball.

== Newscasts ==
While Sinclair had first intended to establish a News Central newscast in Kansas City, that had not materialized by the time Sinclair outsourced most of KSMO-TV's operations to Meredith. Meredith, however, pledged to extend KCTV's newsroom to KSMO-TV as part of its proposal to win the FCC waiver it needed to purchase the station. The 30-minute KCTV 5 News at 9:00 debuted in October 2005, following the closure of the Meredith purchase, promising the same experience "lock, stock, and barrel" as the station offered at 10 p.m. even though KCTV general manager Kirk Black had previously declared it would have its own presentation style. By 2010, the station was also airing a 7 a.m. morning newscast and simulcasting a noon newscast also aired on KCTV.

On August 4, 2014, KCTV began producing a half-hour newscast at 6:30 p.m. for KSMO, utilizing the same anchor team as the 6 p.m. newscast on channel 5. This newscast had been canceled by 2018, when KCTV shifted to airing news in the 7 p.m. hour.

== Technical information and subchannels ==
The station's channels are carried in ATSC 1.0 format on the multiplexed signals of other Kansas City television stations:

Subchannels provided by KSMO-TV (ATSC 1.0)
Subchannel	Res.	Short name	Programming	ATSC 1.0 host
62.1	1080i	KSMO-TV	Main KSMO-TV programming	KCTV
62.2	480i	H & I	Heroes & Icons	KMBC-TV
62.3	480i	Dabl	Dabl	KMBC-TV
62.4	480i	Cozi TV	Cozi TV	KCWE
62.5	480i	Comet	Comet	KCWE

=== Analog-to-digital conversion ===
KSMO-TV shut down its analog signal, over UHF channel 62, on June 12, 2009, the official date on which full-power television stations in the United States transitioned from analog to digital broadcasts under federal mandate. The station's digital signal continued to broadcast on its pre-transition UHF channel 47, using virtual channel 62. The station was then repacked to channel 32 in April 2019.

=== ATSC 3.0 ===
From its transmitter in Independence, Missouri, KSMO-TV broadcasts these subchannels in ATSC 3.0 format:

Subchannels of KSMO-TV (ATSC 3.0)
Subchannel	Res.	Short name	Programming
5.1	1080p	KCTV	KCTV (CBS)
9.1	1080p	KMBC-HD	KMBC-TV (ABC)
29.1	1080p	KCWE-HD	KCWE (The CW)
62.1	1080p	KSMO-TV	MyNetworkTV

Subchannel broadcast with digital rights management

On August 24, 2021, KSMO-TV converted to ATSC 3.0 (NextGen TV) broadcasting as one of two 3.0 transmitters in Kansas City. KSMO-TV hosts the main subchannels of KCTV, KMBC-TV, and KCWE; those stations in turn broadcast its five subchannels in ATSC 1.0 format.
