= KCTV (disambiguation) =

KCTV is a television station (channel 5) licensed to Kansas City, Missouri, United States.

KCTV may also refer to:

- Korean Central Television, the state television channel in North Korea
- Korea Cable TV Gwangju Broadcasting Co., a broadcasting company in Gwangju, South Korea
- Korea Cable TV Jeju Broadcasting, a broadcasting company in Jeju, South Korea
