= KSHB-TV =

Television station in Kansas City, Missouri

- Kansas City, Missouri; United States
- Channels: Digital: 36 (UHF); Virtual: 41
- Branding: KSHB 41

Programming
- Affiliations: 41.1: NBC; for others, see § Subchannels

Ownership
- Owner: E. W. Scripps Company; (Scripps Broadcasting Holdings LLC)
- Sister stations: KMCI-TV

History
- First air date: September 28, 1970
- Former call signs: KBMA-TV (1970–1981)
- Former channel numbers: Analog: 41 (UHF, 1970–2009); Digital: 42 (UHF, 2003–2019)
- Former affiliations: Independent (1970–1986); Fox (1986–1994)
- Call sign meaning: Scripps-Howard Broadcasting (former name of broadcasting division)

Technical information
- Licensing authority: FCC
- Facility ID: 59444
- ERP: 1,000 kW
- HAAT: 325 m (1,066 ft)
- Transmitter coordinates: 38°58′42″N 94°32′1.8″W

Links
- Public license information: Public file; LMS
- Website: www.kshb.com

KSHB-TV (channel 41) is a television station in Kansas City, Missouri, United States, affiliated with NBC. It is owned by the E. W. Scripps Company alongside KMCI-TV (channel 38), an independent station. The two stations share studios on Oak Street in southern Kansas City, Missouri; KSHB-TV's transmitter is located along the Blue River Greenway in the city's Hillcrest neighborhood.

Channel 41 in Kansas City began broadcasting after years of delays as KBMA-TV on September 28, 1970. Owned by and named for the Business Men's Assurance Company, it was the second independent station for Kansas City to sign on the air within twelve months. However, it outlasted competitor KCIT-TV thanks to its superior financial backing. Channel 41 was the primary independent in the market in the 1970s and 1980s, airing syndicated reruns, movies, and local sports with occasional forays into local news programming. Scripps acquired majority control of the station in 1977 and renamed the station KSHB-TV four years later upon its relocation into its present studio facilities. It joined the Fox network at its inception in 1986 and debuted its first full-length news program in 1993.

An affiliation switch in 1994 converted KSHB-TV into the market's NBC affiliate as WDAF-TV (channel 4) became the new Fox affiliate. The station quadrupled its news staff, expanded its facilities, and modified its news format as a result of the change. However, it took years for the station to have much traction in the local news ratings, and it experienced turnover in personnel, management, and strategy.

== History ==
=== KBMA-TV: Early years ===
In 1964 and 1965, the Federal Communications Commission (FCC) received a series of applications proposing new television stations on channel 25 in Kansas City, a channel that had been unused since the 1954 closure of KCTY. The first came from Hawthorn Television of Chicago, which was soon joined by Westport Television—led by William D. Grant, the president of the Business Men's Assurance Company (BMA)—as well as Midway Television of Rockford, Illinois; a subsidiary of Massachusetts-based Springfield Television; and another local group, Allied Television.

The rapidly shifting field was also affected by two national overhauls of the UHF table of allocations in the span of a year. The channel 25 field was essentially split to two new channel assignments, 30 and 36. In October 1965, Westport got the construction permit for channel 30. It was revised again in early 1966 to specify channel 41. KBMA-TV, named for Business Men's Assurance, continued to exist only on paper for another four and a half years after being assigned to channel 41. By the time Allied's station—which was reassigned channel 50 and began as KCIT-TV in October 1969—began broadcasting and gave Kansas City its first independent station, KBMA-TV was still unbuilt and needed yet more time due to a local construction strike. It had not been able to find land for a studio site in Kansas City, Missouri, and had tentatively agreed to construct facilities in Fairway, Kansas, requiring FCC approval. Shortly before KCIT began broadcasting, William D. Grant proposed to buy a controlling stake in KCIT-TV, donate the studio equipment purchased for KBMA-TV and the channel 50 physical plant to local public television station KCSD-TV to become a two-channel operation, and move KCIT-TV to channel 41. He then later proposed merging the two stations and donating channel 41's equipment to the University of Missouri. Stockholders in KCIT-TV rebuffed both overtures.

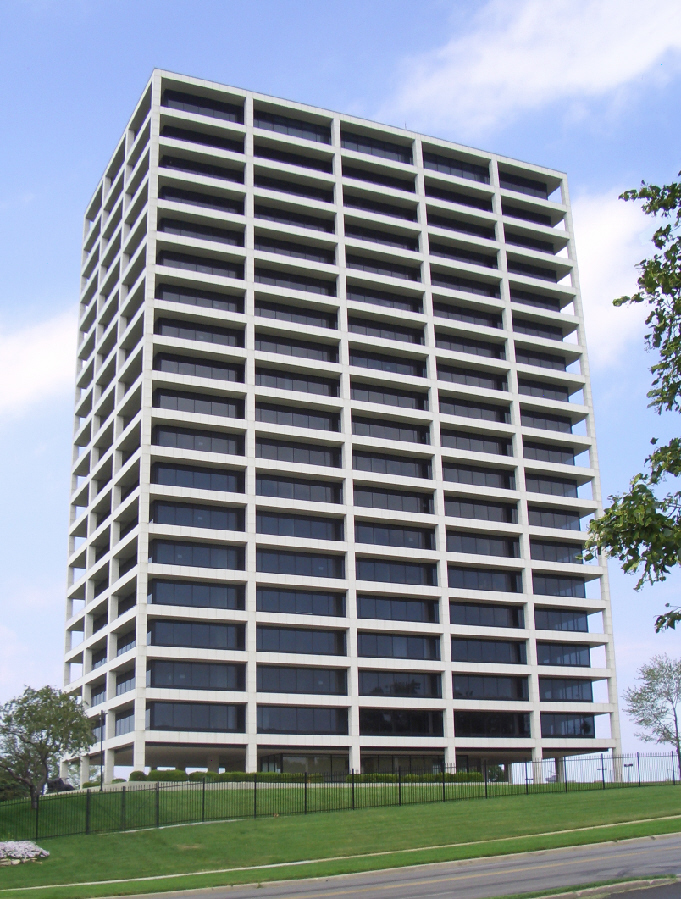
Under BMA ownership, station offices were located in the BMA Tower.

Construction of KBMA-TV took place in 1970. The transmitter facility was built on WDAF-TV's tower, while station offices were located on the 18th floor of the BMA Tower. The station was automated, an innovation for that period, with a computer preparing station logs and switching video inputs. The first telecast was made on the afternoon of September 28, 1970: after a welcome message from general manager Bob Wormington, the first program was the live cartoon show 41 Treehouse Lane, featuring host Ed Muscare. Bob Wormington's twin brother Bill was the manager of rival KCIT-TV. Within a year of KBMA-TV's first broadcast, KCIT-TV went out of business. It left the air on July 8, 1971, citing a poor economy as its reason to shut down. The move bolstered channel 41, now the only independent in the market, which moved to pick up the preempted network programs channel 50 had carried in the Kansas City area and some of its syndicated programming inventory.

Benno C. Schmidt of New York acquired controlling interest in the station in 1971, with BMA remaining a major creditor. The insurer then repurchased a minority stake in Westport Television in 1975. The station continued to be a technical innovator. In 1974, it engaged in a plan to feed Kansas City Royals home telecasts to cable systems in 12 states. This business grew into a separate company, known as Target Network Television, by 1975. In 1976, it filed the first application by any TV station for a satellite earth station, becoming the second station in the United States to use one.

During the 1970s, channel 41 offered a wide variety of programming. When the Royals brought their television and radio operation in-house in 1972, KBMA-TV was selected as the originating station for the television network. By 1975, it was the broadcast home of Royals baseball, Kansas City Kings basketball, and Kansas City Scouts hockey; the Royals remained on channel 41 through 1979, moving to WDAF-TV. Muscare continued as a host of horror and daytime movies before leaving in 1977.

Schmidt and BMA sold Westport Television in 1977 to Scripps-Howard Broadcasting, the radio and television division of the E. W. Scripps Company, for $7.5 million. Its first order of business was to construct a proper studio facility; KBMA-TV had been producing programs in facilities located near the BMA Tower, which only contained its offices. In May 1978, the company obtained approval to construct studios at Brush Creek and Oak on a site of land where neighbors had previously rejected a proposed post office; Scripps-Howard had considered and rejected sites at Crown Center and in Overland Park, Kansas.

=== KSHB-TV: The independent and Fox years ===
On September 28, 1981, coinciding with the station's move into the completed Oak Street facility, the station's call letters were changed from KBMA-TV to KSHB-TV, representing owner Scripps-Howard Broadcasting. The call sign change came alongside a more aggressive attitude to programming the station, which included increased local programming not possible without the two studios in the new building. One of these new local programs was All Night Live, wraparound segments around films and classic reruns in the overnight hours; Muscare returned to the station as host. A similar program in the late morning hours, A.M. Live, debuted in September 1982. By this time, channel 41 had grown into a regional superstation with the spread of cable television in mid-America; it was seen in 600,000 cable households from Iowa to Arkansas.

The 1980s saw increased competition. For the first time since 1971, the market had two independent stations after the December 1983 launch of KEKR-TV on channel 62. However, that station initially failed to spend adequately on programming and did not attract much attention in the market. KSHB-TV local programs included the Kings, who remained on the station even though they failed to attract significant advertising revenue; they departed KSHB-TV after 10 years for KEKR-TV in the 1984–85 season. At the same time, the station's regional cable coverage was waning. At the end of 1985, the cable systems in Wichita, Kansas, and Lincoln, Nebraska, removed channel 41 from their lineups, citing program duplication to other services; the loss of the Royals, the original reason for their addition in Wichita; copyright fees the systems paid to broadcast the distant station; and poor reception of KSHB-TV by microwave.

KSHB became a charter affiliate of the Fox Broadcasting Company when that network launched on October 9, 1986. The station had stronger programming with more first-run shows as a result of the Fox affiliation and a changing syndication market. Wormington retired at the end of 1992, capping a 22-year run at channel 41 in which he had started and led the station, helped found the National Association of Independent Television Stations, and risen to vice chairman of the Fox affiliate board of governors.

Wormington's replacement was Charlotte Moore English, the first woman and first Black person to be a general manager in Kansas City broadcast history. English oversaw the rollout of a full-length local newscast, which debuted on August 1, 1993.

=== As an NBC affiliate ===
On May 23, 1994, as a result of Fox outbidding CBS for the rights to partial rights to the National Football League, New World Communications reached an agreement with Fox parent News Corporation in which the latter company purchased a 20 percent equity interest and reached a multi-year affiliation agreement with New World. Under the terms of the deal, New World would affiliate twelve of the television stations that the company had either owned outright or was in the process of acquiring—specifically those affiliated with one of the "Big Three" networks—with the Fox network, once individual affiliation contracts with each of the stations' existing network partners expired. The only NBC affiliate among the twelve stations was WDAF-TV. Earlier in the month, New World had announced the purchase of WDAF-TV from Great American Communications alongside three other major-market stations.

The result was that NBC needed a new affiliate in the Kansas City market and KSHB-TV was left without a network affiliation. Scripps owned three Fox affiliates, all of which lost the network in the New World switches. The other two local stations—CBS affiliate KCTV, owned by Meredith Corporation, and Hearst-owned and ABC-affiliated KMBC-TV—both re-signed with their respective networks. In the case of the former, Meredith stood ready to flip KCTV to NBC if CBS bypassed its Phoenix TV station, KPHO-TV, in a market where CBS was the displaced network.

In late July, Scripps signed an affiliation agreement with NBC. The switch was set for September 12, 1994, kickstarting a frantic month of changes in programming and personnel at KSHB-TV and WDAF-TV. A newsroom that had 18 employees had to grow to more than 70 in order to begin the production of early evening newscasts by the end of 1994. Plans were also floated to construct an expansion to the Oak Street studio, which was completed in 1997. Dozens of syndicated programs were displaced in the market, particularly at KSHB-TV, which had to make room for NBC's larger program schedule; Fox Kids programs were not picked up by WDAF-TV and instead went to KSMO-TV. A.M. Live also ended its twelve-year run on the air. On the first day of the switch, Willard Scott broadcast the weather for The Today Show from the front lawn of the studios; later that week, Tom Brokaw anchored the NBC Nightly News from Kansas City.

In April 1996, Scripps-Howard Broadcasting took over the operations of KMCI (channel 38) in Lawrence, Kansas, under a local marketing agreement with then-owner Miller Television; that August, the station dropped its home shopping programming and relaunched as "38 Family Greats", in part utilizing programming to which channel 41 had held the rights but had not been able to air since the 1994 affiliation switch. Exercising an option from the 1996 pact with Miller, Scripps bought KMCI outright for $14.6 million in 2000, forming a legal duopoly with KSHB. In July 2003, KSHB and KMCI relocated their transmitter facilities to an 1,164-foot (355 m) tower at the Blue River Greenway in the Hillcrest section of southern Kansas City.

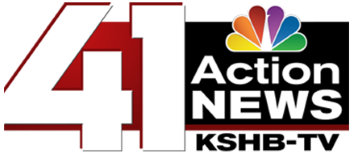
Former KSHB-TV logo as an NBC affiliate from 2012 until 2021

KSHB-TV was the primary NBC affiliate for St. Joseph—within range of its transmitter but defined as a separate media market—from 1994 until 2016, when KNPG-LD (channel 21) was relaunched as an NBC affiliate and displaced KSHB-TV from local satellite TV packages. Suddenlink Communications, the primary cable provider in St. Joseph, then removed KSHB-TV from its lineup in 2017.

A jury found in 2019 that KSHB-TV retaliated against former reporter Lisa Benson Cooper, who is Black; she was fired in 2018 after suing Scripps two years prior, alleging she had been passed over for job opportunities because of her race. Scripps alleged that she had not applied for the positions and cited other reasons, including social media posts, for her suspension and termination. Though the jury awarded damages on the retaliation claim stemming from her firing, it found against her on the claim of racial discrimination. A second discrimination suit was filed by Demetrice "Dee" Jackson, who alleged that he had been passed over twice in favor of White men after applying to be sports director; this was settled out of court in February 2020, after the station released Jackson in late 2019.

== Local programming ==
=== News operation ===
==== Pre-1993 news ====
Beginning at the start of the 1980s, channel 41 dabbled in producing local news programming. In 1980, when Independent Network News debuted, the station began producing five-minute news briefs to air at the beginning and end of the program. After moving into the Oak Street studios, KSHB-TV took small steps toward starting a full-length nightly newscast of its own, beginning with the 1982 hiring of a news director. However, it took quite some time for any newscast to eventuate.

41 Express began airing on June 2, 1985. The 15-minute 10 p.m. newscast had no traditional anchors—stories were read by a rotation of existing reporters and two announcers already heard on local radio—and prompted the station to expand its news staff from six to twelve people. Despite the shorter length, the newscast—which used zippy graphics and segment titles—gave almost as much time to news coverage as the full-length newscasts on the local network affiliates (though with a heavier focus on national stories), with abbreviated weather and sports reports. Many news staffers regularly left channel 41 for job openings at the established stations, where reporters were seen on camera and news approaches were more traditional. The format was tweaked by May 1986, with more sightings of on-camera news anchors and reporters and an increased share of local news stories. Ratings were also low and failed to improve after 41 Express was moved to 11 p.m., after The Late Show, in late 1986; as a result, the newscast was canceled in January 1987 and replaced with more traditional news breaks.

==== A return to news ====
By early 1993, KSHB-TV's news presence consisted of four prime time news briefs. However, Scripps began planning to launch a nightly 9 p.m. newscast for the station. Mark Olinger was hired as news director; he had last worked at KSTW, an independent station in the Seattle market that produced local newscasts. There, he had come under fire and ultimately quit in the middle of a ratings period, having orchestrated the layoffs or demotions of several veteran on-air personalities. Olinger formulated a conversational style of news writing, with phrases like "cop" instead of "police officer", and derided the appearance of news sets at his network competitors as sterile "airline counters".

On August 1, 1993, Fox 41 News at 9:00 debuted. The original Sunday–Thursday anchors were Pam Davis, a former soap opera actress and reporter in Sacramento, California, and Jim Condelles, who had last worked in Indianapolis. While the newscast made heavy use of video, the format also de-emphasized weather, presented in a forecast running about 40 seconds each night, and lacked sports completely. The anchors signed off each night by telling the viewer, "See ya!"

==== NBC expansion ====
Concomitant with becoming an NBC affiliate in September 1994, the station moved its 9 p.m. newscast to 10 p.m. and immediately began the process of expanding its newsroom to eventually produce a full suite of local newscasts. This required adding 54 people to an existing staff of 18. It initially did little to change the young-skewing format adopted as a Fox affiliate, though the set was lightened to better match the NBC Nightly News.

The news expansion took place over a period of nearly two years. The first new program to debut, in October 1994, was a half-hour early-evening newscast at 5 p.m., which was conceived as primarily containing feature reports geared toward women with segments like "Just for Women" and health feature "Howdaya Feel". On March 13, 1995, a 6 p.m. newscast followed, emphasizing local and breaking news stories. By this time, the newscast was adopting a more mainstream format, and Olinger and executive producer Jeff Burnside departed in December. The news expansions were completed in June 1996 with the addition of a 90-minute weekday morning newscast at 5:30 a.m.

Though the newsroom had successfully grown to the size and output expected of an NBC affiliate, the station's news ratings remained low. Barry Garron of The Kansas City Star cited the profusion of out-of-town news reporters and the general lack of stability as factors in the low viewership. Condelles was demoted to weekends, a decision Garron panned as "a new shipment of razor blades" to an operation he characterized as sabotaging itself. Lynn Heider became news director after Olinger. During her tenure, she hired Kansas City–area native Elizabeth Alex—who remained with the station until 2013—as anchor and set up an investigative reporting unit. However, KSHB-TV continued to be stuck in fourth place in the market, though it did slightly better than before at 10 p.m. in retaining NBC prime time viewers for its local newscasts.

In 1997, the station attempted a radical shakeup of its early evening news programming. It scrapped its separate 5 and 6 p.m. newscasts in favor of a single half-hour newscast at 6:30 p.m., where there was no local news offering in the market at the time and where stations rarely programmed their own newscasts. The move was not a ratings or business success, and in March 1999, the station reverted to airing 5 and 6 p.m. newscasts. It also extended its morning news to two hours at the request of NBC, which was launching Early Today and wanted stations to program a full two hours of news between that program and The Today Show.

Since Scripps acquired KMCI-TV, at various points, channel 38 has aired newscasts from the KSHB-TV newsroom. The first local newscast at channel 38, at 9 p.m., debuted in 2000; it was scrapped in 2003, a victim of low ratings. News returned to channel 38 in 2015, when a 7 a.m. morning news extension was added.

==== Action News ====
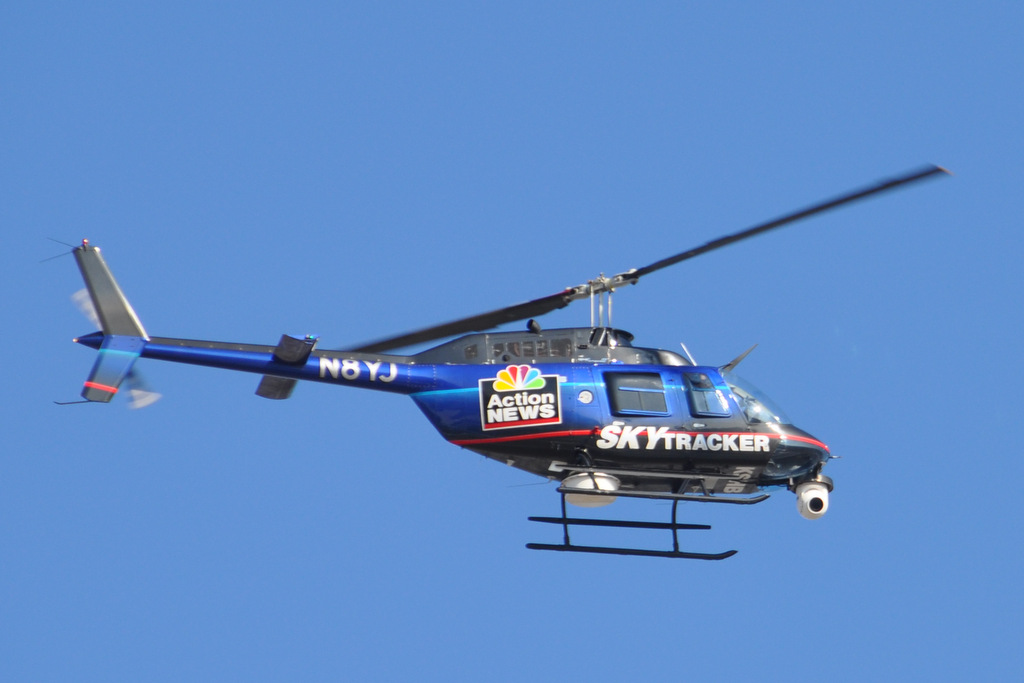
KSHB-TV's news helicopter, as seen in 2010

In January 2003, the station rebranded as NBC Action News, removing references to the channel number; it also extended its morning newscast even further out to 4 a.m. The brand was tweaked to 41 Action News in 2012, with station management noting that people still called the station "channel 41" despite not having used the channel number in on-air promotion in nearly a decade. Between 1999 and 2014, KSHB-TV had four general managers and five news directors.

For the first time in its history, KSHB-TV experienced ratings momentum in the late 2000s and early 2010s. Where once the station had lost 40 percent or more of its viewers from NBC prime time to the 10 p.m. news, by the time general manager Jim Swinehart retired in 2006, the station was actually gaining viewers for its late news compared to the preceding programming. In November 2013, it registered a time slot win at 6 p.m., the first time in station history it had the number-one newscast at that time slot and culminating a steady rise dating back five years. It eked out its first monthly win in late news during the February 2014 sweeps period, bolstered by the lead-in of NBC's broadcast of the 2014 Winter Olympics helping increase news ratings by 46 percent. However, the station was still third in early morning news and at 10 p.m. outside of the Olympics. The early 2010s also saw the station expand its morning newscast back to a 4:30 a.m. start, add a 4:30 p.m. newscast in 2011 and expand it to a full hour at 4 in 2013, and win the Alfred I. duPont-Columbia University Award for breaking news for its coverage of the natural gas explosion that leveled JJ's Restaurant in downtown Kansas City.

The Action News brand was dropped in 2021 in favor of KSHB 41 News under general manager Kathleen Choal.

=== Sports programming ===
Under a six-year agreement, KSHB and KMCI replaced KCTV as the official broadcast partners of the Kansas City Chiefs in 2019, giving the stations exclusive rights to team programming, including preseason contests beginning in 2020, plus marketing opportunities.

On November 6, 2013, Scripps announced a broadcasting agreement between KSHB/KMCI and Sporting Kansas City, which gave KMCI the local broadcast television rights to the Major League Soccer (MLS) club's regular season matches and its pre-game and post-game shows beginning with the team's 2014 season. The deal also allowed both stations the rights to carry team-focused specials during the regular season. The relationship between the Scripps stations and Sporting Kansas City continued through 2022, after which Apple assumed the rights, local and national, to all MLS teams.

=== Non-news ===
In September 2005, KSHB debuted a locally produced mid-morning talk show titled Kansas City Live. This show aired until January 2008 and was the first such program on the station since Kansas City Today, which aired between 1998 and 1999; despite making money, it was a casualty of the introduction of Later Today by NBC. The introduction of a fourth hour of Today in 2007 and a desire to add more newscast hours were reasons for the cancellation of Kansas City Live.

==== Notable former on-air staff ====
- Russ Ptacek – investigative reporter (2006–2012)

== Technical information ==
=== Subchannels ===
KSHB-TV's transmitter is located along the Blue River Greenway in the Hillcrest neighborhood of Kansas City, Missouri. The station's signal is multiplexed:

Subchannels of KSHB-TV
Subchannel	Res.	Short name	Programming
41.1	1080i	KSHB-TV	NBC
41.2	480i	Grit	Grit
41.3	480i	Laff	Laff
41.4	480i	GetTv	Great (4:3)
38.1	720p	KMCI-TV	KMCI-TV (Independent)
38.2	480i	Bounce	Bounce TV (KMCI-TV)

Broadcast on behalf of another station

KSHB-TV transmits two subchannels of KMCI-TV, one of Kansas City's two ATSC 3.0 (NextGen TV) stations; channel 38 began broadcasting a ATSC 3.0 signal in August 2021.

=== Analog-to-digital transition ===
KSHB-TV shut down its analog signal, over UHF channel 41, on June 12, 2009, the official date on which full-power television stations in the United States transitioned from analog to digital broadcasts under federal mandate. The station's digital signal continued to broadcast on its pre-transition UHF channel 42, using virtual channel 41. As part of the FCC's repack, KSHB-TV moved to channel 36 on February 11, 2019.
