= WDAF-TV =

Television station in Kansas City, Missouri

- Kansas City, Missouri; United States
- Channels: Digital: 34 (UHF); Virtual: 4
- Branding: Fox 4 Kansas City

Programming
- Affiliations: 4.1: Fox; for others, see § Subchannels

Ownership
- Owner: Nexstar Media Group; (WDAF License, Inc.)

History
- First air date: October 16, 1949
- Former channel number: Analog: 4 (VHF, 1949–2009)
- Former affiliations: NBC (1949–1994); ABC, CBS, and DuMont; (all secondary, 1949–1953)
- Call sign meaning: Derived from WDAF radio

Technical information
- Licensing authority: FCC
- Facility ID: 11291
- ERP: 1,000 kW
- HAAT: 347 m (1,138 ft)
- Transmitter coordinates: 39°4′21″N 94°35′46″W

Links
- Public license information: Public file; LMS
- Website: fox4kc.com

WDAF-TV (channel 4) is a television station in Kansas City, Missouri, United States, affiliated with the Fox network. Owned by Nexstar Media Group, the station maintains studios and transmitter facilities on Summit Street in the Signal Hill section of Kansas City, Missouri.

WDAF-TV is Kansas City's oldest operating TV station, beginning broadcasts in October 1949, and was the only station in the city for three and a half years. It, along with WDAF radio (610 AM), was an NBC affiliate owned by The Kansas City Star newspaper. Under The Star, the station developed its news department with national coverage of the Great Flood of 1951 and aired a series of popular local programs. After the newspaper was investigated for monopolistic practices in advertising sales, it signed a consent decree in 1957 and sold the WDAF stations to National Theatres the next year. Under National and subsequent owner Transcontinent Television Corporation, WDAF-TV largely coasted on the news image it had crafted and enjoyed a slight edge in local ratings.

Taft Broadcasting acquired WDAF radio and television in 1964 as part of its purchase of most of Transcontinent. Under Taft, the station's news ratings suffered as cost-cutting and corporate mandates produced a revolving door of on-air personnel; one bright spot was the early evening news, which WDAF led in the 1970s and early 1980s. Between 1980 and 1992, the station was the local broadcaster of Kansas City Royals baseball games. Ratings took a dive in the years after Taft Broadcasting was purchased in 1987 and reorganized as Great American Broadcasting Company, with the station posting multi-year lows in the late 1980s and early 1990s.

New World Communications acquired WDAF-TV and three other Great American stations in 1994, then switched the affiliations of WDAF-TV and 11 other stations to Fox. The station's weekday news output more than doubled to accommodate extended news coverage throughout the day, including in morning news, which became a station strength. Fox parent News Corporation bought the New World Fox affiliates, including WDAF-TV, in 1996; channel 4 remained third in local news through this period. WDAF was sold to Local TV LLC in 2007, Tribune Media in 2013, and Nexstar in 2019, becoming more competitive with second- and first-place ratings finishes in news.

== Early years ==
=== Construction and launch ===
On December 12, 1947, The Kansas City Star Company, the parent of The Kansas City Star newspaper as well as Kansas City radio station WDAF (610 AM), applied to build a television station on channel 4. One account stated that the newspaper's board of directors was deadlocked on whether to apply for a TV station. Publisher Roy A. Roberts cast the deciding vote in favor of the application, believing that television might "contribute to the good of our community". The Federal Communications Commission (FCC) approved the application on January 30, 1948. Though the permit was obtained in January 1948, The Star did not announce its plans for WDAF-TV until later. By the end of 1948, it had purchased land at 31st and Summit streets in Kansas City, Missouri, for a facility to house WDAF television (and eventually radio) and poured the bases for a 724-foot (221 m) tower to broadcast WDAF-TV on the same site. Employees trained in television at WNBT in New York, and TV cameras and other equipment were on order. The last section of the tower was put into place on May 23, and the first test pattern broadcasts were made on the evening of August 20. Despite no prior warning, it received phone calls commenting on the reception, including from as far away as Omaha. The Star held a three-day television expo in the Memorial Auditorium from September 11–13, demonstrating the new medium, and began regular broadcasts of the test pattern at that time.

The first program aired on WDAF-TV was not regularly scheduled. It was the September 29 testimonial dinner for William M. Boyle, live from the Arena in the Municipal Auditorium, an event at which president Harry S. Truman spoke and which five local radio stations covered. The first night of regular viewing on WDAF-TV was October 16, 1949, when channel 4 presented a four-hour schedule including a dedication, a live telecast from the American Royal, films of the station's construction, local news (a telegraph tape moved in front of the camera to display the news), and a salute to WDAF-TV by Arthur Godfrey. Program manager Bill Bates estimated that 7,000 sets were in use to watch WDAF-TV's inaugural broadcast and that 100,000 people watched that first night. Though WDAF-TV was the first modern station on the air, it was predated by the experimental W9XAL, which operated in the 1930s.

WDAF-TV was a primary affiliate of NBC, but as the only television station in Kansas City, it held program agreements with the other major networks: CBS, ABC, and the DuMont Television Network (from May 1950). All network programs the station aired in its first year of operation were kinescopes—filmed recordings off the television monitor of the original broadcast—before network coaxial cable service reached Kansas City beginning September 30, 1950. With the advent of live service for network entertainment and sports programming, the station nearly doubled its weekly output from 32–35 hours to 57–60 hours. In February 1951, WDAF-TV carried the Sugar Ray Robinson vs. Jake LaMotta fight live on the air. The telecast, sponsored by Pabst Blue Ribbon beer and aired over CBS, was a milestone, as neither WDAF-TV, WDAF radio, nor The Star had ever previously accepted any alcohol advertising.

The Great Flood of 1951 devastated the Kansas City area, and WDAF-TV provided ample coverage and public service during the incident. The station covered the flooding in its nightly weathercast by Shelby Storck and Heart of America Newsreel, aired live flood coverage by placing a camera on the studio roof and zooming in on damage, and commissioned an aircraft to shoot aerial footage. WDAF's flood footage was aired nationally by CBS. News director Randall Jessee, who held that position for WDAF radio and television, was cited in hindsight as a calming influence and earned the moniker "Mr. Television" locally. The station's first mobile outside broadcasting van was a converted Packard hearse; its successor, nicknamed "Cosa Nostra", once turned up at a bank robbery before police.

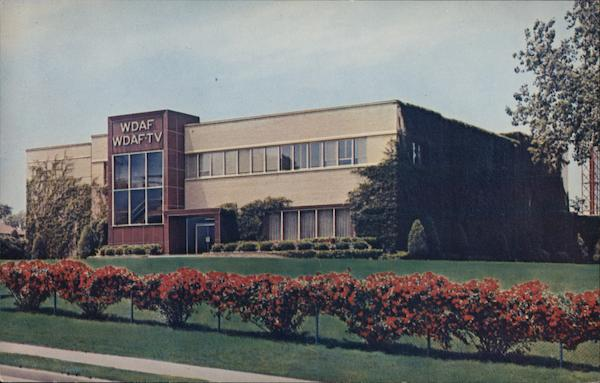
A circa-1960s view of the WDAF studios as they appeared after the 1952 expansion

In 1952, the studios at 31st and Summit (Note: This area was not known as Signal Hill until the station coined the moniker in 1958.) were expanded from 7,000 to 28,000 square feet (650 to 2,600 m^{2}), enabling WDAF radio to be co-located with channel 4. The enlarged facility boasted four TV studios, a kitchen for use in home programming, and facilities to originate network programming if necessary. The kitchen was used by a new women's program, Kitchen Klub with Bette Hayes, which by November 1952 was airing every weekday. It broadened from a cooking program to include in-studio interviews and was renamed The Bette Hayes Show, remaining on the air until its host departed in 1970. Other local programs of the 1950s included the children's show Dr. Inventor and the teen dance program TV Teen Town.

=== New competition ===
WDAF-TV obtained its construction permit in January 1948, before the FCC that October imposed a freeze on new TV station grants to sort out possible changes to television broadcast standards. This freeze lasted until 1952, setting the stage for four competitors on three channels to enter the Kansas City television market within a four-month span in 1953. First to do so was an ultra high frequency (UHF) station, KCTY (channel 25), on June 6. It originally was affiliated with CBS, ABC, and DuMont. The former two networks each relocated to new very high frequency (VHF) stations that started shortly thereafter. On August 2, the time-share operation of KMBC-TV and WHB-TV on channel 9 launched as a CBS affiliate; ABC got its new affiliate on September 27, when KCMO-TV began on channel 5.

In addition to three new TV stations, WDAF-TV faced two other challenges in 1953. In January, the United States Department of Justice called for the revocation of the licenses of WDAF radio and television and filed a civil antitrust lawsuit against The Kansas City Star Company. Charging the firm with "monopolizing the dissemination of news and advertising in Kansas City", the department alleged that advertisers not using The Star or its sister, the morning Kansas City Times, were shut out of advertising on TV. It also questioned the use of discounts for cross-media buys of WDAF radio and the newspapers in the 1930s. On May 22, an announcer's strike put WDAF radio and television off the air as technicians refused to cross AFTRA picket lines. The strike lasted 28 days, until June 19, leaving Kansas City with no television at all for two weeks (until KCTY began).

The criminal portion of the anti-trust case proceeded to trial in January 1955, and The Star and its advertising director were found guilty of monopoly charges. The civil portion was settled by way of a consent decree approved on November 15, 1957. In addition to restrictions on the operations of The Star and Kansas City Times, it required the WDAF stations to be divested. Several buyers had already negotiated with the newspaper company, including Time Inc., Cox Broadcasting, and J. H. Whitney & Company. To comply with the terms of the consent decree, on November 26, The Kansas City Star Company sold the WDAF stations to National Theatres, a movie theater chain with 320 cinemas, for $7.6 million. The Los Angeles–based company had ties to Kansas City, as its president, Elmer C. Rhoden, had previously been the head of Fox Midwest Theatres and still had a home there. The WDAF stations marked the expansion of National into broadcasting. The FCC approved the sale in April 1958, and National assumed ownership in late May. Walt Bodine succeeded Randall Jessee as news director; he remained associated with the WDAF stations until 1965.

National merged with National Telefilm Associates and changed its name to National Theatres and Television in 1959, and shortly after, the company began selling off business divisions. NTA had owned KMSP-TV in Minneapolis, which was sold off in 1959 along with several money-losing movie houses. National Theatres and Television sold the WDAF stations in 1960 to Transcontintent Television Corporation for $9.75 million. An FM radio station, WDAF-FM 102.1, was added to the operation in March 1961. Under Transcontinent ownership, WDAF-TV continued to be, by a slim margin, the leading station in Kansas City. In a 1963 column in Variety, Les Brown noted that while the three major stations (WDAF, KCMO, KMBC) were in a "Mexican standoff" in prime time, WDAF had the slight edge in news but was "still rid[ing] on the news momentum of when it was owned by The Kansas City Star".

== Taft/Great American ownership ==
In 1963, Transcontinent sold the WDAF stations, as well as WGR AM-FM-TV in Buffalo, New York, and WNEP-TV in Scranton, Pennsylvania, to Cincinnati-based Taft Broadcasting. The Transcontinent purchases brought Taft to the limit of seven television stations. The transaction was part of the largest set of sales in broadcasting history to that time, totaling more than $38.5 million for three buyers to acquire nearly all of Transcontinent's radio and TV stations. After receiving FCC approval, the deal was finalized on April 1, 1964. In 1967, the existing tower on Signal Hill was replaced with a new, 1,164-foot (355 m) mast that was shared with a new Kansas City independent station, KBMA-TV (channel 41), which began broadcasting in 1970.

After the purchase, Taft led a round of cost-cutting measures that slimmed down the news department. In 1972, the radio news department, which had continued to share resources with television, was separated. The next year, the television news director resigned after being forced to implement budget cuts of 5 to 8 percent; The Star/Times television critic Joyce Wagner described WDAF radio and television as having a "revolving door policy" due to constant corporate cuts, noting, "In the last six years, WDAF has lost enough personnel to fully staff at least three television and radio stations." By 1976, channel 4's late newscast was in a distant third-place position against its competitors; Barry Garron of The Kansas City Star wrote in 1985 of this era, "For most of the 1970s WDAF-TV acted as if local news were an inconvenience."

In response to the falling ratings, the station rebranded its newscasts Action News and hired two new on-air personalities, including Stacy Smith, who had previously anchored in Louisville, Kentucky. Smith remained WDAF-TV's main male anchor until he departed in 1983 for KDKA-TV in Pittsburgh; he was replaced by Phil Witt. Witt, who had joined WDAF in 1979 as a weekend anchor and reporter, remained in that position for the next 34 years.

In 1980, WDAF-TV replaced KBMA-TV as the television home of Kansas City Royals baseball under a five-year contract; the team sought the move because WDAF's signal went further than KBMA's. Under the deal, WDAF presented between 40 and 47 Royals games a year. The relationship between WDAF and the Royals was renewed for another three years, covering 1985 through 1987, followed by a five-year renewal covering 1988 through 1992 with an increase to 51 games per year.

Taft in 1982 bought WDAF-TV a satellite uplink which was used for baseball and by the news department, and the station's news staff grew from 24 to 39 full-time employees, with Royals games providing a platform to promote the late newscast. During this time, WDAF-TV was separately home to a regional news bureau for the short-lived Satellite News Channel cable service. While the station's late news continued to rank third, WDAF-TV came on stronger in the early evening newscasts, particularly the 5 p.m. slot where it had been first to establish a news presence, and in 1985 it registered two consecutive ratings surveys in which it led at 5, 6, and 10 p.m.

On October 12, 1987, an investment group led by Carl Lindner Jr. completed a hostile takeover of Taft Broadcasting from the Taft family, which had owned the company; the Taft Broadcasting name remained with the Taft family, and the reorganized firm became Great American Broadcasting Company. Due to the way the reorganization was structured, FCC rules of the time required Great American to sell either its radio stations or its TV station in the Kansas City and Cincinnati markets where it had grandfathered operations. However, Great American received a permanent waiver in 1989 to maintain its broadcasting clusters in each city. After the change, the station debuted a morning newscast in 1988, but WDAF-TV's evening news ratings slumped. In November 1989, it posted its lowest audience shares at 5, 6, and 10 p.m. of the entire decade, while KMBC-TV had become the new number-one with decade-long highs. The Royals departed after the 1992 season for independent station KSMO-TV (channel 62), which offered the opportunity to telecast more games; the 65 games a season to be carried by KSMO was more than WDAF-TV had ever offered in its 13-year tenure as the team's TV broadcaster. In its last year, WDAF-TV had especially strained to juggle the Royals and NBC programming: Johnny Carson's final nights of The Tonight Show and several NBA playoff games in 1992 were seen on a tape-delayed basis to accommodate baseball telecasts.

Harris Faulkner joined the WDAF-TV staff as a reporter in February 1992. Months later, as part of a reshuffling of the station's anchor lineup, she added anchoring duties for the 6 p.m. newscast alongside Phil Witt, and when Witt's co-anchor on the other newscasts departed, Faulkner replaced her. The station also expanded its news department in the early 1990s. It was the first station in the market to begin weekend morning newscasts, doing so in 1992. WDAF-TV leased a helicopter in 1993, becoming the first TV station in town to do so and breaking a years-long gentlemen's agreement among the major stations in Kansas City to prevent the stations from competing with helicopters. KCTV responded by leasing a helicopter of its own.

The 1987 Taft buyout saddled Great American with a substantial debt load it could no longer service, and other subsidiaries of Great American Communications Corporation filed for Chapter 11 bankruptcy protection in 1993, a move that did not affect the television and radio holdings. After emerging from bankruptcy, Great American Broadcasting (renamed Citicasters soon after) put four of its stations (including WDAF-TV) up for sale, seeking to raise money to pay down debt and fund more acquisitions in radio.

== Becoming a Fox affiliate ==
=== Sale to New World Communications and the Fox affiliation switch ===
WDAF-TV and the other three Great American television stations were sold to New World Communications on May 5, 1994, for $350 million in cash and $10 million in share warrants; Great American retained KYYS and WDAF radio. This was one of several transactions made by New World owner Ronald Perelman since his takeover of SCI Television in February 1993, as New World purchased four stations from Argyle Television Holdings for $717 million three days earlier.

On May 23, 1994, WDAF-TV was identified as one of twelve present or future New World stations that would switch network affiliations to Fox; WDAF was the lone NBC affiliate affected. Fox parent News Corporation purchased a 20 percent equity stake in New World as part of the agreement, which came after the network outbid CBS for partial rights to the National Football League and sought to upgrade their affiliate base. KCTV re-signed with CBS and KMBC re-signed with ABC via larger deals by their corporate parents; KCTV owner Meredith Corporation stood ready to flip the station to NBC if CBS bypassed its Phoenix TV station, KPHO-TV, in a market where CBS was the displaced network. Outgoing Fox affiliate KSHB-TV, one of three Scripps-Howard stations that lost Fox with the New World deal, signed with NBC in late July 1994.

The date of the switch was announced on August 10, 1994, to be September 12, three days after New World's purchase of WDAF was slated to close and initiating a month of programming changes between the stations. Fox Kids, which WDAF declined to carry, went from KSHB to KSMO-TV. WDAF and KSHB quickly began rapid expansions of their news departments, with WDAF adding 21 hours of local news weekly—particularly in the morning and early evening—and hiring an additional 35 staffers, while KSHB readied production of early-evening newscasts. WDAF's 45-year relationship with NBC ended with the switch, but its existing "Newschannel 4" branding was retained.

Though its weekday news output expanded from three hours a day to seven, including a three-hour morning newscast and a 9 p.m. news hour, WDAF-TV fared poorly in news ratings following the switch to Fox. While its morning newscast held steady in audience share, its 5, 6, and 10 p.m. newscasts each declined, especially the 10 p.m. news, which went from having NBC programming as a lead-in to having the 9 p.m. news as a lead-in and lost half its audience year-over-year. Barry Garron, the television critic for The Kansas City Star, described the switch from a three-way to a two-way news ratings race as "the first significant change in Kansas City ratings patterns for news in at least 15 years". This situation was unchanged a year later: WDAF-TV was second in mornings, but it finished third, only ahead of the new NBC affiliate KSHB-TV, in evening news. An attempt to create a competitor to the national network newscasts by relaunching the 5:30 p.m. half hour as Your World Tonight with Phil Witt lasted a year before being discontinued. The morning news expanded to a 5:30 a.m. start in 1995.

=== Fox ownership ===
News Corp. agreed to purchase New World Communications in a $2.5 billion deal announced on July 17, 1996, with WDAF-TV joining Fox's owned-station division; talks between the two companies had stalled earlier in the year but restarted when Perelman pursued a deal for King World. On January 26, 1997, four days after the deal was finalized and coinciding with Fox's telecast of Super Bowl XXXI, WDAF-TV rebranded as "Fox 4". Later that year, WDAF-TV became the preseason television home of Kansas City Chiefs football, replacing KMBC-TV and starting a relationship that lasted six seasons before the Chiefs moved preseason games to KCTV beginning in 2003.

The station's evening newscasts continued to rate in third place during Fox's ownership; Faulkner departed in 2000 for KSTP-TV in St. Paul, Minnesota. The morning news moved to a 5 a.m. start in 2002, bringing the station up to eight hours of weekday newscasts. By 2005, WDAF was third at 5 and 10 p.m. but fourth at 6 p.m., though its morning newscast continued to lead the local ratings.

WDAF was one of four stations Fox Television Stations was rumored to divest on June 29, 2001, in order to free up additional ownership cap space as part of Fox's purchase of the Chris-Craft Television group. Black business executive Luther Gatling made an offer to purchase the stations from News Corp., who confirmed the offer but denied any negotiations ever took place. The need for Fox to divest WDAF and the other stations was obviated after the FCC was mandated by a court ruling to increase the national ownership cap from 35 percent to 39 percent.

== Local TV, Tribune and Nexstar ownership ==
On December 22, 2007, Fox sold WDAF-TV and seven other stations to Local TV LLC for $1.1 billion; the stations were divested so News Corp. could raise additional capital for its $5 billion purchase of Dow Jones & Company. Local TV incurred up to $400 million in debt purchasing the stations and faced bankruptcy threats with the onset of the Great Recession; by February 2009, all WDAF staff were furloughed for two weeks, the station's helicopter was grounded, the entire freelance budget was eliminated, and Phil Witt anchored evening newscasts solo. The Tribune Company purchased Local TV on July 1, 2013, for $2.75 billion.

During this time period, WDAF slowly improved its ratings standing in a competitive market. While the morning news race had grown tighter between WDAF and KMBC, the station was second in early evening news and third in late news by 2010. The 9 p.m. newscast was outrating competing newscasts from KCTV (on KSMO-TV) and KMBC-TV (on KCWE). The morning news was expanded from four hours to five and a half with the addition of a 9 a.m. hour and a 4:30 a.m. half-hour in 2011. By 2013, WDAF had moved up to first in early evening news, even though KMBC had surpassed channel 4 in mornings.

Sinclair Broadcast Group announced a $3.9 billion purchase of Tribune Broadcasting on May 8, 2017. Tribune terminated the merger on August 9, 2018, following a rejection of the deal by FCC chairman Ajit Pai. Following the Sinclair-Tribune merger collapse, Tribune agreed to be purchased by Nexstar Media Group on December 3, 2018, for $6.4 billion. By 2020, WDAF was the leading station in mornings again and either second in households or in first place among viewers 25–54 in late evening news. In 2022, a 4 p.m. weekday news hour was introduced.

== Notable former on-air staff ==
- Mark Alford – morning anchor, 1998–2021
- Owen Bush – station announcer and sportscaster, 1952–1959
- Al Christy – program director and weatherman, early 1950s
- Jack Cafferty – anchor, weatherman, sports director, and host of the talk show Cafferty & Company, 1968–1974
- John Dennis – sports director, mid-1970s
- Bill Grigsby – sportscaster, 1970
- Brian Karem – investigative reporter, 1997–1998
- Gayle King – anchor/reporter, 1978–1981
- David Schechter – reporter, late 1990s
- Shelby Storck – weatherman, 1949–1954
- Bob Wells – host of TV Teen Town and weatherman, 1959–1965

== Technical information ==
=== Subchannels ===
WDAF's transmitter facility is co-sited with its studios on Summit Street in Kansas City, Missouri. The station's signal is multiplexed:

Subchannels of WDAF-TV
Subchannel	Res.	Short name	Programming
4.1	720p	WDAF-DT	Fox
4.2	480i	ANT TV	Antenna TV
4.3	480i	Rewind	Rewind TV
4.4	480i	TBD	Roar
38.3	480i	Mystery	Court TV (KMCI-TV)
38.4	480i	HSN	HSN (KMCI-TV)

Broadcast on behalf of another station

=== Analog-to-digital conversion ===
WDAF-TV began providing a digital signal on March 25, 2002. The service was initially broadcast at low power from a lower-mounted antenna on the Signal Hill tower until a new, high-power digital transmission facility was completed in 2005. The station shut down its analog signal, over VHF channel 4, on June 12, 2009, the national digital television transition date; WDAF continued to transmit its digital signal on its pre-transition UHF channel 34, using virtual channel 4.
