= Elizabeth Alex =

American news anchor

Elizabeth Alex is an American former news anchor who was the lead anchor for KSHB-TV ("41 Action News") in Kansas City, Missouri until 2013. She currently serves as Executive Director of University Relations at Kansas City University.

== Biography ==
Alex is a native of the Kansas City area, growing up in Overland Park and graduating from Shawnee Mission West. Alex attended the University of Arkansas and worked in Fayetteville and Fort Smith, Arkansas, The Quad Cities and West Palm Beach, Florida, before settling back in her hometown.

Alex has earned many journalism awards during the course of her career. They include awards for all around reporting, feature, investigative and 5 regional Emmys. Her honors include an award for work on a six-month project into pollution at a former oil refinery in Sugar Creek. Alex has been named "Best Newscaster" by Pitch Weekly magazine and The Johnson County Squire. She has also been honored by the National Kidney Foundation and received a Humanitarian Award from Medical Missions Foundation.

Alex reaches the Kansas City University (KCU) audience directly through the KCU blog. She covers various campus initiatives including the KCU Student Run Clinic, and KCU's global outreach efforts, like the Global Health program's community clinic involvement. Additionally, Alex has published work for the United Aid Foundation and Medical Missions Foundation.

Alex supports Operation Breakthrough Center for children in Kansas City, Heart to Heart International aid organization and she organizes a food drive to benefit St. Therese Little Flower Food Pantry. Alex has covered the war in Afghanistan, the tsunami in Sri Lanka, and the aftermath of Hurricane Katrina in New Orleans.

Alex also shares a close bond with cancer patients and their families following the loss of her late husband, Brian to esophageal cancer. She has reported on, and often speaks about esophageal cancer, the fastest growing cancer in the United States. Alex and her family live in Kansas City.

Alex left 41 Action News on February 27, 2013. After her time at the news station, she became the Community Outreach and Media Relations Director at Unbound]. She now is Executive Director of University Relations at Kansas City University, a private medical school with its main campus in Kansas City, Missouri, and an additional campus in Joplin, Missouri.

== Education ==
Alex graduated from the University of Arkansas and began her career at KZZB radio in Fort Smith, Arkansas and assumed responsibilities as anchor, reporter, and producer for Fort Smith's NBC affiliate KPOM-TV. She went on to anchor the nightly newscasts at WQAD-TV in the Quad Cities and anchored the evening newscasts at WFLX in West Palm Beach, Florida before joining KSHB-TV.

== Awards ==
Alex has earned several journalism awards including 5 regional Emmys for Best Newscast and a number of projects including a six-month investigation into pollution at a former refinery in Sugar Creek, Missouri. Alex was named "Best Newscaster" by Pitch Weekly magazine. She also received: Kansas City Social Media Club Gold Amp Award, Nonprofit Connect Filly Awards, media relations and video production, Numerous Associated Press, Missouri Broadcaster and Kansas Broadcaster awards, Medical Missions Foundation Humanitarian Award, American Cancer Society Award, National Delta Gamma Oxford Award, Madame President Distinguished Leadership Award, Kidney Foundation Award, Soroptimist Club Ruby Award, and the Catholic Charities Bishop Sullivan Award.

== Current Affiliations ==
Alex is involved in several volunteer and humanitarian causes including helping a girl from Gaza get needed medical care. She serves on the board of directors for Hope Faith Ministries, Kansas City Public Television, Metropolitan Community College, and United Aid Foundation. In addition, she volunteers with Operation Breakthrough.

== Past Affiliations ==
While her current focus is on the organizations listed above, Alex's dedication to humanitarian work extends further. She previously served on the board of directors for Medical Missions Foundation delivering free medical care to developing countries and Smile Again USA providing reconstructive surgery to Pakistani women attacked with battery acid. She also passionately advocated for the medical needs of a young girl from the Gaza Strip. Prior to her position at Kansas City University, Alex also served as Community Outreach and Media Relations Director at Unbound.
