= Edarem =

American entertainer and sex offender (1932–2012)

- Edarem in 2009
- Born: Eduardo Joseph Vianney; September 27, 1932; New York City, U.S.
- Died: January 8, 2012 (aged 79); Lake Butler, Florida, U.S.
- Other names: Edarem, Uncle Ed, Edmus Scarey
- Occupation: Entertainer
- Years active: 1970–1986, 2006–2009
- Known for: YouTube videos

Edward Robert Muscare (born Eduardo Joseph Vianney; September 27, 1932 – January 8, 2012), also known by his pseudonyms of Edarem, Uncle Ed, and Edmus Scarey, was an American television presenter, entertainer, internet celebrity, and sex offender. He gained success online through his eccentric and comedic posts on YouTube, uploaded from 2006 through 2009.

Born into a working-class Sicilian immigrant family in Queens, New York, Muscare moved to Hialeah, Miami, as a teenager, before joining the United States Army. He became a presenter for local programming in Kansas City and Phoenix, but his career ended following an arrest for sexual battery in 1986. In 2006, he began posting videos of himself to YouTube, where he achieved widespread popularity. However, probation requirements relating to his 1987 conviction stipulated that he was forbidden to own a computer, and by doing so, he was put on trial in 2010, and sentenced to five years in prison for violation of probation. A campaign was organized by his friends and supporters claiming that his imprisonment was unjust, but he died before he could be released.

== Biography ==
=== Early life ===
Muscare was born Eduardo Joseph Vianney in 1932 in Corona, Queens, New York City. His mother, Angelina (1896–1976) had been born in Caltanissetta, Sicily, and had married his father, Salvatore Vianney before the couple immigrated to New York in 1916. Trying to earn a living in their new home, his father worked as a tailor while his mother worked as a seamstress. Edward was the youngest of seven children (3 sons and 4 daughters), although shortly after his birth, his father left his mother to have a relationship with another woman. He was raised nominally Roman Catholic, and underwent Holy Communion and Confirmation, but noted that his family rarely followed the moral teachings of the faith.

In 1945, the family moved to Florida, where he attended high school, particularly enjoying speech class, English class and the glee club. It was here that he got his first girlfriend and bought his first car, a 1929 Essex. He was voted "Best Personality" in his school's 1951 Year Book. Upon graduation, he moved to New York for a while, where he worked in a dress factory, until returning to Florida. After getting into trouble with the law, Muscare joined the United States Army in 1952. He was stationed in Fort Jackson, South Carolina and then West Germany, where he worked as a Morse code operator. In 1959, he married Ruth Carr in Nevada before later separated. She died in 1961.

=== Television work ===
Muscare began his entertainment career in 1970 for KBMA-TV (later KSHB-TV) in Kansas City, Missouri, as host of the children's program 41 Treehouse Lane, which he hosted until 1983. As a television presenter, he went by the stage name "Uncle Ed", and also hosted a late-night show (for which he wore a vampire costume) called Uncle Ed's All Night Live until 1984. The following year, Muscare, using the moniker "Edmus Scarey" (a play on his name's actual pronunciation), debuted on KNXV-TV in Phoenix as the host of Friday Night at the Frights, a late-night program airing horror B-movies. He resigned abruptly one year later.

=== Arrest ===
In 1986, Muscare had sexual contact with a 14-year-old boy. His actions were reported to the police, and he was arrested shortly after leaving KNXV-TV. The following year, he was charged with sexual battery. He was sentenced to imprisonment for 18 months and placed on probation for ten years. Muscare is not known to have reoffended, commenting that "I would never sexually offend again, but we can't help but sin. We're all human beings".

=== YouTube fame ===
In 2006, he created an account on YouTube, using the pseudonym Edarem, and posted 130 videos of himself online, featuring him undertaking "strange antics" and lipsynching to songs such as Roy Orbison's "Oh, Pretty Woman". The uploaded videos became popular with viewers, receiving hundreds of thousands of views, and turning Muscare into an "internet sensation".

In 2007, Muscare moved out of his home in Florida, claiming he had suffered harassment from neighbors who had learned he was on the sex offenders' registry. He relocated to Orangeburg, South Carolina where, although he was legally required to inform the local authorities about his status as a former sex offender, he neglected to do so, fearing that he would be persecuted by angry neighbors if they found out about his criminal past. He then appeared on a television show in Orlando, in which he argued for sex offenders being given a second chance in society, and also stated that he refused to inform the local authorities about his former crime as he feared for his safety. Upon seeing this show, South Carolina police learned that he had moved into their state, and issued a warrant for his arrest. Officers came to his house on May 1, 2009, where they confiscated his alcohol and computer, using the justification that under South Carolina law anyone with a previous conviction for sex offences is forbidden from owning either of these. He agreed to allow his computer to be inspected without notice, and it was found to contain no illegal material. Rather than being sent to prison for not informing the authorities about his earlier conviction, he was placed on five-year probation, one of the conditions for which was that he was forbidden from owning a computer without permission.

No longer able to upload videos through his computer, Muscare instead got a friend to continue posting his videos on YouTube, believing that this would be permitted under the rules of his probation order. Nonetheless, prosecutors still saw this as a breach of his probation, and he was taken to court in Orlando, where he told Lake Circuit Judge Mark Hill that "I'm frankly bewildered that I'm here; I don't think I've done anything wrong". He argued that he was not a threat to society, and was simply "an entertainer, and I've entertained all my life", with his videos simply being "done in fun and I'm sure that most of the people see it that way." Judge Hill did not, however, accept Muscare's defense, and on January 6, 2010, sentenced him to five years in prison for violating his probation order.

Fans of Muscare's YouTube videos posted messages of support on the site, many criticizing Lake Circuit Judge Mark Hill's decision as unfair. His neighbor also claimed that Muscare's imprisonment was unjust, describing him to reporters as "a helpful, warm, loving, kind, friendly neighbor who's always there when you need him". In late 2010, Edarem's YouTube page began being updated regularly by his partner and fiance, Marion Kolehmainen.

== Death ==
In October 2011, Muscare's partner Marion announced that she had found a tumor in his neck and he was later diagnosed with lung cancer. The doctor had given him three months to live. On the evening of January 9, 2012, she announced both on her Facebook page as well as in a video uploaded to his YouTube account that Muscare had died the previous night in jail.
