= KCTV =

Television station in Kansas City, Missouri

- Kansas City, Missouri; United States
- Channels: Digital: 24 (UHF); Virtual: 5
- Branding: KCTV 5

Programming
- Affiliations: 5.1: CBS; for others, see § Subchannels

Ownership
- Owner: Gray Media; (Gray Television Licensee, LLC)
- Sister stations: KSMO-TV

History
- First air date: September 27, 1953
- Former call signs: KCMO-TV (1953–1983)
- Former channel numbers: Analog: 5 (VHF, 1953–2009)
- Former affiliations: ABC (1953–1955); DuMont (secondary, 1954–1955)
- Call sign meaning: Kansas City Television

Technical information
- Licensing authority: FCC
- Facility ID: 41230
- ERP: 1,000 kW
- HAAT: 344 m (1,129 ft)
- Transmitter coordinates: 39°4′14.4″N 94°34′57.5″W

Links
- Public license information: Public file; LMS
- Website: www.kctv5.com

KCTV (channel 5) is a television station in Kansas City, Missouri, United States, affiliated with CBS. It is owned by Gray Media alongside KSMO-TV (channel 62), an independent station with MyNetworkTV. The two stations share studios on Shawnee Mission Parkway in Fairway, Kansas; KCTV's transmitter facility, the KCTV Broadcast Tower, is located in the Union Hill section of Kansas City, Missouri.

Channel 5 was the fourth television channel to go on the air in Kansas City; KCMO-TV began broadcasting on September 27, 1953, as the television adjunct of KCMO radio. (Note: KCMO-TV was technically the fifth station on air, but only four channels were in use, because KMBC-TV and WHB-TV shared channel 9 until 1954.) Originally an ABC affiliate, it switched to CBS in 1955 as part of a group affiliation agreement negotiated by the Meredith Corporation, which agreed to buy KCMO radio and television less than a week after KCMO-TV began broadcasting. In 1956, the present tower, a Kansas City landmark, was completed to broadcast the station.

Despite protests from Kansas City civic leaders, KCMO-TV moved its studio facilities to Fairway, Kansas, at the end of 1977. Meredith sold the KCMO radio stations in 1983; as this required the television station to change its call sign, it paid a Texas station $25,000 to release the call sign KCTV for use in Kansas City. Gray acquired Meredith in 2021.

== History ==
=== Establishment ===
On January 26, 1948, the KCMO Broadcasting Corporation, owner of Kansas City radio station KCMO (810 AM), applied to the Federal Communications Commission (FCC) for a permit to build a new television station on channel 5. It would be more than five years before that application was granted, largely because of a four-year freeze on TV station grants. Five different groups had pending applications for new TV stations in Kansas City: KCMO, the New England Broadcasting Company, and Kansas City radio stations KCKN, KMBC, and WHB. The freeze ended in April 1952, at which time KCMO and KMBC were already buying and storing equipment with an eye to starting TV stations, and KCMO had already identified the use of its KCMO-FM tower at its studios at 31st and Grand streets to telecast its station.

While KCMO had already applied for channel 5, KCKN had originally sought channel 2, which was removed from Kansas City in the final 1952 allocations; that station then amended its application to specify channel 5. New England Broadcasting had also filed for channel 5, but its application was dismissed by the FCC in January 1953.

KCKN withdrew its application at the start of June 1953 after co-owned WIBW became the sole applicant for channel 13 in Topeka, Kansas. The FCC granted the construction permit on June 3, 1953, at which time KCMO estimated that KCMO-TV would begin in about four months, bringing to the city additional network programs that WDAF-TV, the only pre-freeze TV station in the city, could not fit in its schedule. This was the first very high frequency (VHF) station construction permit awarded in Kansas City since the end of the freeze; a ultra high frequency (UHF) station, KCTY, had been awarded for channel 25. The grant of KCMO-TV's permit spurred KMBC and WHB, applicants for channel 9, to combine their bids and seek shared-time use of the channel. The FCC promptly approved on June 25, and KMBC-TV and WHB-TV began transmitting from an interim facility on August 2. Channel 9, under both licensees, would be the CBS affiliate in Kansas City; KCMO-TV by that point had set a start date of September 27, the end date of daylight saving time.

KCMO-TV made the September 27 start date, with an official dedication featuring former president Harry Truman as the guest of honor taking place on October 4. It took the ABC affiliation, giving Kansas City four channels for the four networks: NBC on WDAF-TV, CBS on KMBC-TV and WHB-TV, DuMont on KCTY, and ABC on KCMO-TV. Before the first week of telecasting on channel 5 had concluded, the KCMO Broadcasting Company agreed to sell itself to the Meredith Publishing Company of Des Moines, Iowa, for $2 million. Meredith executives had visited several weeks prior to tour the television facility; company president E. T. Meredith joked that he would like to have a radio and television property closer to Des Moines than its holdings in Syracuse, New York. He was more than joking; he expressed serious interest in the property to Tom L. Evans and Lester Cox, KCMO's stockholders, with Cox letting Evans sell the stations. This gave Meredith its fourth television station: it had built WHEN-TV in Syracuse and made radio-TV purchases in consecutive years that brought WOW-TV in Omaha, Nebraska, and KPHO-TV in Phoenix, Arizona, into the fold. DuMont programs moved to KCMO-TV in February 1954, when the network—having bought KCTY in an unsuccessful salvage attempt—opted to shut down that station. The network ceased operations in 1955.

=== Switch from ABC to CBS ===
In January 1955, Meredith reached a group affiliation deal with CBS covering its radio and television properties outside Phoenix. (Note: Simultaneously, KPHO-TV in Phoenix lost the CBS affiliation to KOOL-TV, which was owned by entertainer Gene Autry and whose radio counterpart, KOOL, was the CBS affiliate in Phoenix.) The agreement saw KCMO radio and television become CBS secondary outlets with immediate effect. The news was received, per a report in Variety, with "puzzlement" in Kansas City, where KMBC radio was the sixth-oldest CBS affiliate with more than 25 years of service to the network. KCMO-TV joined CBS and KMBC-TV joined ABC on September 28, 1955, with their radio counterparts exchanging affiliations on December 1. After a year of construction, in February 1956, the original KCMO-FM tower was replaced by the present tower on the site, then measuring 1,042 feet (318 m), and the station began broadcasting at the maximum effective radiated power of 100,000 watts.

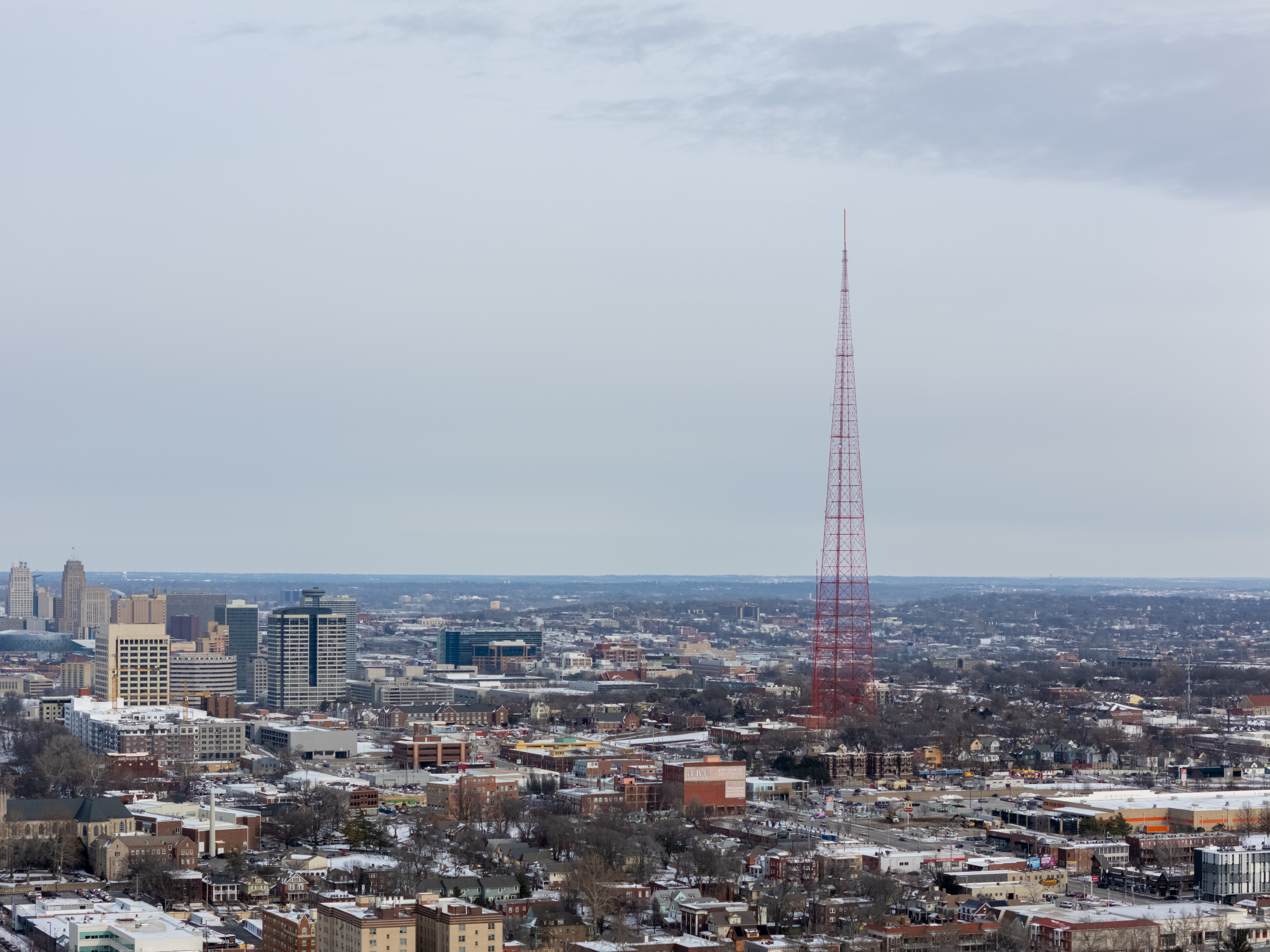
KCTV's transmitter tower as seen from the southeast. In the 1970s, when KCMO radio and television moved to Fairway, Kansas, Kansas City civic leaders suggested dismantling the tower because of the hazard posed by falling ice.

KCMO continued to broadcast from the 31st Street studios for more than 20 years. However, in 1976, under general manager Charles McAbee, it announced plans to move its operation from Kansas City across the state line to Fairway, Kansas, where it planned to build a studio facility twice the size. Members of city government expressed dismay at the proposed relocation of the radio and television stations and even suggested dismantling the large tower beside the studios as an icing hazard; McAbee claimed to have scouted six sites in Kansas City itself, including Crown Center. Kansas City councilmembers went as far as to allow the legal department to protest the continued use of the KCMO call letters if the radio and television operations moved to Fairway, though the FCC and a federal appeals court rebuffed their challenges. Kansas City's public television station, KCPT, then agreed to purchase the 31st Street studios from KCMO; however, KCMO-TV itself would continue to be broadcast from the tower at the site. The Fairway move was completed at the end of 1977.

=== Becoming KCTV ===
In 1982, Meredith announced it would sell the Kansas City radio stations to Richard Fairbanks, retaining the television station; it noted that the radio properties were not meeting its "growth objectives". The separation of KCMO radio from KCMO-TV required one or the other to change its call sign upon completion of the sale. Meredith found its new call letters for channel 5 in San Angelo, Texas, where KCTV had been on the air with that designation since 1957. KCMO-TV approached the Texas station, which agreed to seek new call letters, leaving KCTV open to be claimed in Kansas City; the Texas station was reimbursed for all of its expenses in changing over. The KCTV in Texas became KLST in March 1983, and KCMO-TV became KCTV on June 6, 1983, with the station launching a promotional campaign among advertisers and the public.

When a major affiliate realignment caused WDAF-TV to switch affiliations from NBC to Fox in 1994, the displaced NBC network wooed KCTV as an affiliate. However, CBS was also courting Meredith and ultimately able to secure an affiliation agreement for KCTV, KPHO-TV in Phoenix, and WNEM-TV in Saginaw, Michigan, the latter two becoming new CBS affiliates.

KCTV logo, used from December 2020 to September 2024

Meredith entered into a $26.8 million agreement to acquire the non-license assets of KSMO-TV (channel 62), then an affiliate of The WB owned by Sinclair Broadcast Group, in November 2004, immediately assuming responsibility for KSMO's advertising sales and administrative operations under a joint sales agreement and moving its staff to the KCTV facility in Fairway. It also had an option to buy the station if FCC rules so approved for a further $6.7 million. Meredith then filed to buy KSMO-TV outright in January 2005, a transaction that required a failing station waiver from the FCC as there would be fewer than eight unique owners of TV stations in the market. On the grounds that KSMO-TV's revenue and market share had steadily declined in the preceding five years, the commission granted the waiver in September 2005, approving the transaction. It created the third duopoly in Kansas City, alongside KSHB-TV with KMCI-TV and KMBC-TV with KCWE.

KCTV was the CBS affiliate of record in St. Joseph, Missouri, from 1967—when local station KFEQ-TV switched from CBS to ABC—until June 1, 2017, when locally based KBJO-LD (channel 30, which concurrently became KCJO-LD) switched its primary affiliation from Telemundo to CBS. A month later, KCTV was removed from Suddenlink's St. Joseph cable system.

=== Sale to Gray Television ===
On May 3, 2021, after 68 years of Meredith ownership, Gray Television announced its intent to purchase the Meredith Local Media division, including KCTV and KSMO-TV, for $2.7 billion. The sale was completed on December 1.

== Local programming ==
=== News operation ===
In 1979, KCMO-TV paired Wendall Anschutz, already a 13-year veteran of the channel 5 news staff at that time, with 23-year-old Anne Peterson to anchor the station's evening newscast. The pairing endured in some form through 2001, making it the longest-lasting in Kansas City television. In 1981, channel 5 had the first 10 p.m. newscast in the market to reach a 40 share—40 percent of homes watching TV at that time. However, the station spent most of the 1980s and early 1990s in a competitive battle with KMBC-TV and WDAF-TV for news viewers. It was also the first television station in the United States to begin closed captioning of its local newscasts in 1982—years ahead of Boston's WCVB-TV, which claimed to be the first to do so in 1986.

By the early 1990s, KMBC-TV had taken a clear first place in the market, particularly among more desirable younger viewers. As part of a major overhaul of the station's news programming, in 1993, longtime sportscaster Don Fortune and reporter Marty Lanus were let go. At that time, the station also launched weekend morning newscasts, becoming the second Kansas City outlet to do so behind WDAF-TV and complementing the launch of weekday morning news a year earlier. However, ratings continued to slide to their lowest numbers since 1985. Though figures improved to the point where channel 5 narrowly edged out channel 9 in 1996, KCTV ceded most of that ground in most time periods during 1998.

KCTV's news presentation underwent a major overhaul under Kirk Black, whom Meredith promoted from WNEM-TV to serve as KCTV's general manager in 2001, and news director Regent Ducas, hired in April 2002. The goal was to overtake KMBC-TV as the top-rated television news operation in Kansas City. The major changes included the assignment of the station's news anchors to conduct field reports, the expansion of its weekday morning newscast to a then-unusual 4:30 a.m. in December 2001, and the debut of a late-afternoon newscast at 4:30 p.m. on March 4, 2002. Six months after Ducas's hiring, KCTV adopted "Live. Late-Breaking. Investigative." as its new slogan and unveiled a new, darker-colored news set and new logo with a larger 5. After a severe weather outbreak in May 2003 where the station opted to continue with live coverage helmed by meteorologist Katie Horner, KCTV became aggressive in preempting regular programming for severe weather coverage, sparking the ire of some viewers.

Another radical change occurred on November 17, 2003, when the station announced that it would shut down its in-house sports department and enter into an outsourcing agreement with local cable sports channel Metro Sports. Metro Sports produced sportscasts for KCTV's evening newscasts, as well as sports specials and Kansas City Chiefs–related programs, from its facility at Swope Park. Sports anchors William Jackson and Leif Lisec and sports reporter Neal Jones were terminated by KCTV after sports production transferred to Metro Sports on February 9, 2004. Though Kirk Black cited research that indicated that most news viewers were not interested in sports, the move was criticized by many local sports radio hosts, who thought that Black's decision to shutter the sports department showed his lack of understanding of the market's rabid sports fanbase, and by the station's union, as the non-union Metro Sports replaced KCTV's own employees. The Metro Sports arrangement ended in 2009 and was supplanted by a deal with Kansas City sports radio station WHB. The outsourcing of sports ended in 2010, when KCTV reestablished a sports department by hiring Lawrence, Kansas, native Michael Coleman as sports director; he remained at the station until 2017.

The station's change in direction under Black saw several additional talent exits, and newsroom turnover was heavy. In addition to veterans Stan Cramer, Anschutz, and others who were among 170 company employees to take voluntary retirement packages in 2001, several veteran reporters, including 23-year employee Reed Black and 29-year reporter Geri Gosa, departed in 2002; while anchor Russell Kinsaul had his contract not renewed in 2004 and was hired at KMOV in St. Louis, KCTV saw its news ratings increase to their best competitive position in years.

There were also controversies around the newsroom, some caused by the station's investigative reports. A series of reports conducted in partnership with Perverted Justice in the style of the later NBC series To Catch a Predator created legal issues: of the 16 people lured by KCTV's sting, none could be arrested, but three filed defamation complaints and another sued Meredith and Perverted Justice alleging entrapment. The Columbia Journalism Review chided reporter Dave Helling for a 2004 report in which he misrepresented the type of ammonium nitrate he bought in a report about illegal sales of the fertilizer in Kansas. KCTV was enjoined by Kansas courts from using information it had obtained about patients of a plastic surgeon in Mission Hills, Kansas, who had discarded a computer containing private patient data only for it to be found by a scavenger and the data turned over to the station; however, it did broadcast a report featuring one anonymous patient, and the doctor faced a class action lawsuit from the patients.

In 2007, a longtime newscast director sued Meredith and charged that the company had engaged in systematic harassment and dismissal of older employees. A judge denied KCTV's move to dismiss the suit; station management later reached a monetary settlement with the plaintiff.

As part of the acquisition of KSMO-TV, Meredith promised to add a newscast to its lineup for its first time. The 30-minute KCTV 5 News at 9:00 debuted in October 2005, after the purchase closed, promising the same experience "lock, stock, and barrel" as the station offered at 10 p.m. even though KCTV general manager Kirk Black had previously declared it would have its own presentation style. By 2010, the station was also airing a 7 a.m. morning newscast and simulcasting a noon newscast also aired on KCTV. Though the station also experimented with a 6:30 p.m. newscast on KSMO in 2014, this newscast had been canceled by 2018, when channel 62 shifted to airing news in the 7 p.m. hour.

Black left in 2009 when Meredith promoted him to run its largest and most troubled television station, WGCL-TV in Atlanta. Citing research showing that the station was perceived as "annoying", his successor, Brian Totsch, moved to tone down the station's style, ditching the "live, late-breaking, investigative" tagline he called a "punchline"; reducing the number of severe weather cut-ins; and dismissing lead investigative reporter Ash-har Quraishi. Ratings fell, and KCTV was in third place again by 2011. However, the station's performance outside of news continued to be strong: in 2013, it won total-day ratings, especially prime time, despite not winning any of the local news races, which were split among WDAF-TV and KMBC-TV.

After being abruptly let go in 2015, former news anchor Karen Fuller sued Meredith, alleging age discrimination specific to female anchors, though Meredith cited poor performance as the reason for her dismissal. Though a district judge in Kansas refused to dismiss the case, before it was to go to trial in Kansas City, Kansas, the two parties settled in 2018.

As KCMO-TV, the station won a Peabody Award in 1978 for a documentary, "Where Have All The Flood Cars Gone?", on the sale of damaged cars after a flood hit the Kansas City area. The story was reported by investigative reporter John Ferrugia.

=== Sports programming ===
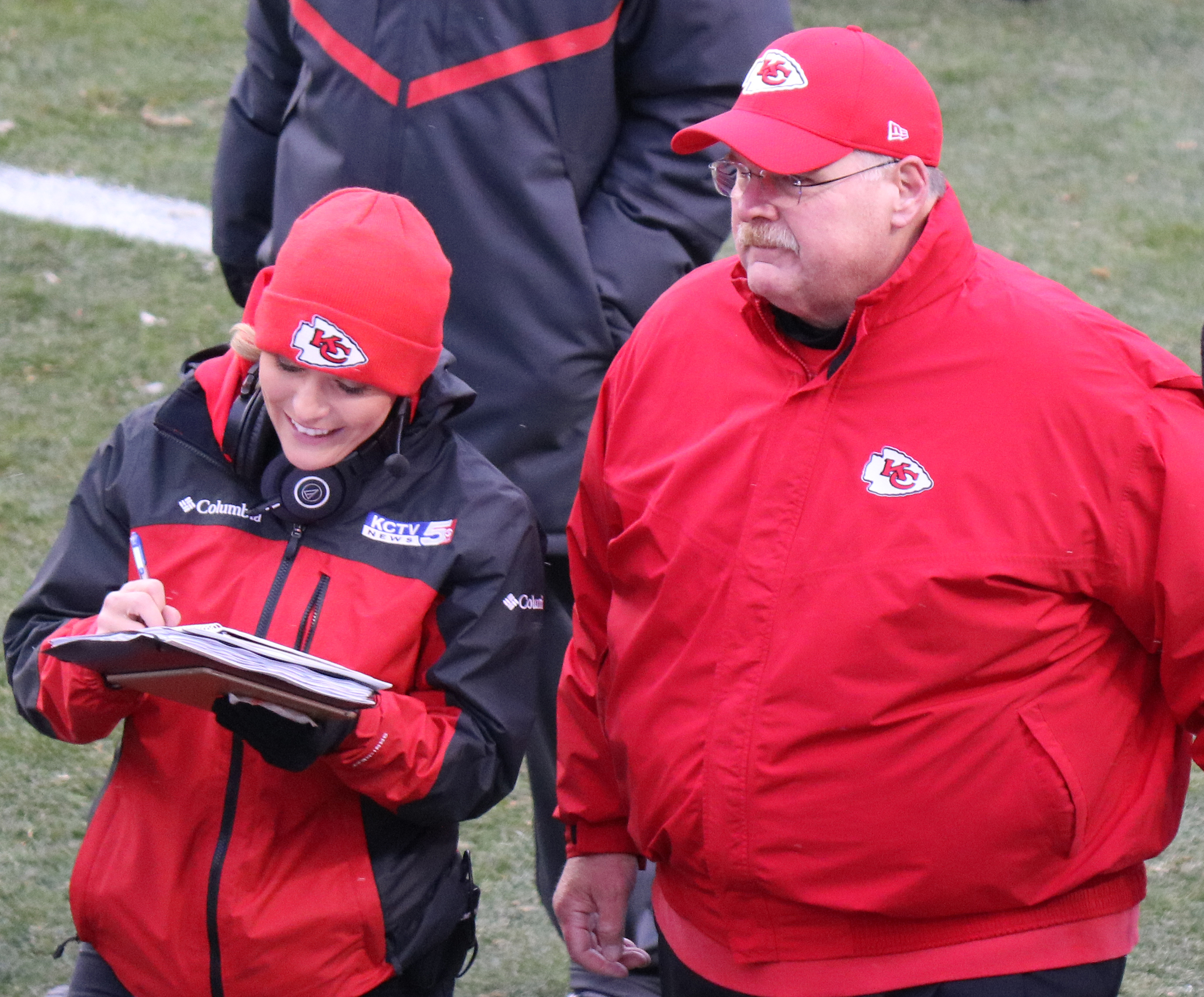
Sideline reporter Dani Welniak interviewing Chiefs coach Andy Reid in 2017

From 2003 through 2019, KCTV was the preseason television home of Kansas City Chiefs football and associated coaches shows, complementing its carriage of most of the team's regular-season games as part of CBS's NFL rights. On September 21, 2019, the Chiefs announced that KSHB-TV and KMCI-TV would become their official broadcast partners, replacing KCTV after 17 years.

In 2025, sister station KSMO-TV, as well as Gray-owned stations in the Kansas City Royals TV territory, broadcast 10 Sunday games simulcast with FanDuel Sports Network Kansas City, with KCTV airing at least six of the contests.

=== Local non-news programming ===
KCTV previously produced the talk and lifestyle program Better Kansas City, which aired weekday mornings at 9 a.m. and was produced independently from the station's news department. The program, which initially debuted in 2012, was formatted after the national Meredith-distributed lifestyle program Better.

==== Notable former on-air staff ====
- Karen Foss – anchor, 1978–1979
- Don Harrison – reporter and anchor, 1962–1973
- Doug McKelway – weekend anchor, 1983–1988

== Technical information ==
=== Subchannels ===
The station's signal is multiplexed:

Subchannels of KCTV
| Subchannel | Res. | Short name | Programming |
|---|---|---|---|
| 5.1 | 1080i | KCTV | CBS |
| 5.2 | 480i | The365 | 365BLK |
| 5.3 | 480i | StartTV | Start TV |
| 5.4 | 480i | Quest | Quest |
| 5.5 | 480i | OUTLAW | Outlaw |
| 62.1 | 1080i | KSMO-TV | KSMO-TV (Independent with MyNetworkTV) |

Broadcast on behalf of another station

KCTV transmits the main channel of KSMO-TV, one of Kansas City's two ATSC 3.0 (NextGen TV) stations; channel 62 began broadcasting an ATSC 3.0 signal in August 2021.

=== Analog-to-digital conversion ===
KCTV signed on its digital signal on October 15, 2002, but it was not until November 2003 that the station began broadcasting network programming in high definition. The station ended analog broadcasts on VHF channel 5, at 9 a.m. on June 12, 2009, the official date on which full-power television stations in the United States transitioned from analog to digital broadcasts under federal mandate. The station's digital signal continued to broadcast on its pre-transition UHF channel 24, using virtual channel 5.

== Tower ==
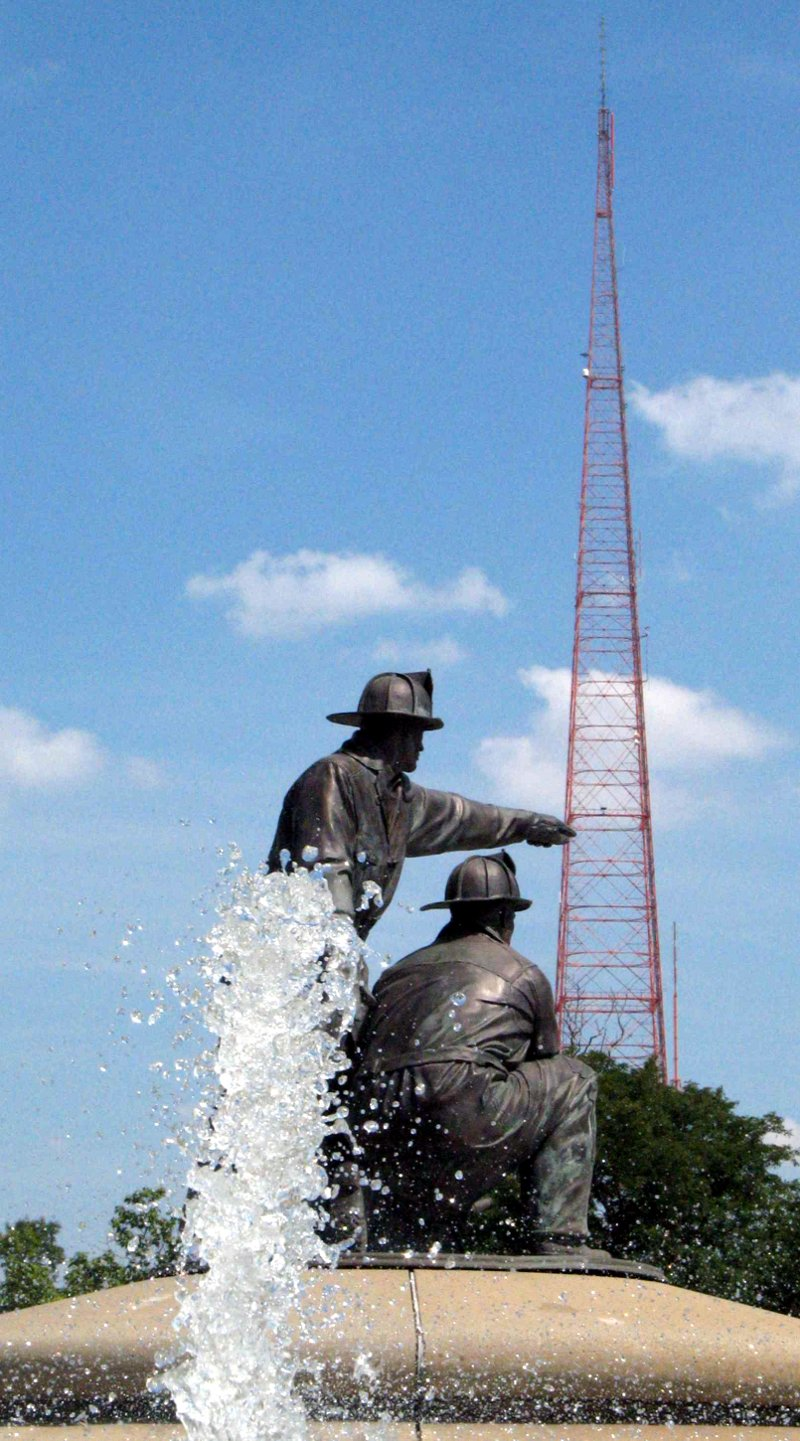
KCTV's transmitter tower on Union Hill

Since February 1956, KCTV has been broadcast from a 1,042-foot (318 m), four-sided transmission tower located at its now-former studios at 31st and Grand streets in the Union Hill neighborhood, south of downtown Kansas City. This replaced a shorter tower at the same site. Even after the move to Fairway, KCTV has continued to be broadcast from this facility, though there were calls from Kansas City leaders to dismantle it as part of the move, citing the danger from falling ice in winter. Falling ice from the tower has been known to damage nearby cars and homes and require police to block off adjacent streets.

The tower has had several different lighting schemes in its history, mostly having been lit in white lights. It first went dark for a year during the 1973 energy crisis; it was flashed on in the evening and then turned off as a reminder to Kansas Citians to conserve electricity. Beginning in 1989, the lights were flashed for a time in upward- or downward-moving patterns to suggest the day's weather forecast. For a time after the September 11 attacks, the lights were changed to red, white, and blue. The tower went dark beginning in 2005, when it was turned off because most of the 1,360 light bulbs had burned out. A new permanent lighting installation featuring 96 LED fixtures capable of dynamic displays and color-changing effects was activated on September 18, 2025, ahead of the 2026 FIFA World Cup.

The tower was originally nicknamed the "Eye-full Tower"; Kansas City's building commissioner had compared its design to the Eiffel Tower in Paris. It was taller than the Eiffel Tower when built, though a television antenna was later added to the Paris tower, increasing its height.
