= Rui Xu =

American politician from Kansas

Member of the Kansas House of Representatives from the 25th district
- Incumbent
- Assumed office January 8, 2019
- Preceded by: Melissa Rooker

Personal details
- Born: 1989 (age 36–37) Basel, Switzerland
- Party: Democratic
- Education: University of Southern California (BA)
- Occupation: Marketing analyst Sports analyst

Chinese name
- Simplified Chinese: 徐瑞
- Hanyu Pinyin: Xú Ruì
Transcriptions
Standard Mandarin
- Hanyu Pinyin: Xú Ruì

Rui Xu (born 1989) is an American politician serving as a Democratic member of the Kansas House of Representatives for the 25th district since 2019. He is the first Chinese American to serve in the Kansas Legislature and the only Asian American currently serving in the body.

== Early life and career ==
Xu was born in Basel, Switzerland in 1989 to Chinese parents pursuing PhDs and the family moved to the United States when he was two years old. He grew up in Rolla, Missouri, and became a US citizen when he was 12 years old. Xu earned a Bachelor of Arts in economics from the University of Southern California.

Xu has worked as a marketing analyst at Children International and as a sports analyst at Sporting Kansas City.

== Kansas House of Representatives ==
Xu was elected to the Kansas House of Representatives for the first time in 2018, defeating incumbent Republican Melissa Rooker. With the victory Xu became the first Chinese American to serve in the Kansas Legislature. As of the 2024 election cycle he is the only Asian American currently serving.

In 2020 and 2022, Xu ran for the seat unopposed. In 2024, he ran against Republican challenger Greg J. Schoofs. In 2024, Xu voted for a bill which would divest Kansas' public pension fund from Chinese assets, however he criticized the bill for potentially causing anti-Chinese sentiment.

=== Committees ===
Xu has served on the Kansas House committees for Agriculture, Education, Higher Education Budget, and Financial Institutions and Pensions. He also served on the 2020 Special Committee on Kansas Mental Health Modernization.

== Political positions ==
Xu is a member of the Democratic party. He opposes restrictions to abortion access and opposed the 2022 Kansas abortion referendum which sought to restrict abortion in the state. He has been endorsed by the nonprofit health services organization Planned Parenthood.

Xu has proposed several bills to address climate change. He supports expanding LGBTQ rights in Kansas, condemning the passage of a bill that restricted same-sex couples from adopting children.
