= Melissa Rooker =

American politician (born 1964)

Member of the Kansas House of Representatives from the 25th district
- In office January 14, 2013 – January 14, 2019
- Preceded by: Barbara Bollier
- Succeeded by: Rui Xu

Personal details
- Born: June 29, 1964 (age 62) Kansas City, Missouri, U.S.
- Party: Republican
- Spouse: Tom Rooker
- Children: 2
- Education: University of Kansas

Melissa Rooker (June 29, 1964) is a Republican and former member of the Kansas House of Representatives and formerly the director of development of Malpaso Productions.

== Biography ==
Rooker was raised in Fairway, Kansas. She graduated from Shawnee Mission East High School in Prairie Village, Kansas, and the University of Kansas, and is married with two children.

== Film career ==
Rooker became director of development of Malpaso Productions in 1995. Previously, she had been an assistant to the company's founder, Clint Eastwood.

== Political career ==
Rooker was a member of the Kansas House of Representatives until 2019. She is a Republican.
