= KCTY (Kansas City) =

Television station in Kansas City, Missouri (1953–1954)

- Kansas City, Missouri; United States
- Channels: Analog: 25 (UHF)

Programming
- Affiliations: DuMont Television Network

Ownership
- Owner: DuMont Television Network

History
- First air date: June 6, 1953
- Last air date: February 28, 1954
- Former affiliations: CBS and ABC (1953)
- Call sign meaning: "Kansas City"

Technical information
- Power: 1 kW
- Transmitter coordinates: 38°56′24″N 94°40′50″W

KCTY (channel 25) was a television station in Kansas City, Missouri, United States, which broadcast from June 6, 1953, to February 28, 1954. It was the second television station to begin broadcasting in the Kansas City area after WDAF-TV. KCTY was an affiliate of the DuMont Television Network; originally owned by the Empire Coil Company, which had pioneered UHF telecasting, DuMont purchased the station outright at the end of 1953 and operated it for two months as a study in the problems of struggling UHF stations nationwide before concluding that there was no path to economic viability. The studio for KCTY was located in the Pickwick Hotel in downtown Kansas City; the transmitter was located in a rural area that today is part of Overland Park, Kansas.

== History ==
After the four-year freeze on television station awards was ended in 1952 with the opening of the UHF band for television broadcasting, Kansas City received several UHF television channels—noncommercial channel 19 and commercial 25 and 65—in addition to three commercial VHF assignments. In November, the Empire Coil Company of New Rochelle, New York, filed for channel 25 as well as channel 30 in St. Louis. Empire Coil had been a trailblazer, having built KPTV (channel 27) in Portland, Oregon, the first commercial UHF television station, as well as WXEL, a VHF station in Cleveland. At the time, channel 4 was occupied by pre-freeze WDAF-TV, while both channels 5 and 9 were contested among more than one applicant. Radio stations KCMO and KCKN fought for channel 5, while stations KMBC and WHB had applied for channel 9.

With its application unopposed, Empire Coil was granted a construction permit for channel 25 on January 23, 1953. The new station, with studios in the Pickwick Hotel downtown and a transmitter on 87th Street in an area of Johnson County, Kansas, that is now Overland Park, would serve as the local carrier of CBS, ABC, and DuMont Television Network programs. KCTY was eyed as a proving ground for UHF, as it would be the first UHF station to compete with a pioneer (pre-freeze) VHF outlet; an intense push to ensure sets were converted to receive the UHF station; and a second VHF station looked likely within months. A merger of two applicants in share-time operation on channel 9 and KCKN dropping out of the contest for channel 5 had considerably sped along the progress of the VHF stations compared to the situation when Empire Coil applied for the permit.

Empire Coil president Herbert Mayer

KCTY began broadcasting on June 6, 1953, operating with an interim schedule consisting of two movies a day and test patterns to help dealers calibrate equipment, such as UHF converters that most sets needed to tune the new station. It went on the air as WDAF radio and television was in the middle of a strike that had left Kansas City without television service for more than two weeks. While authorized to broadcast with an effective radiated power of 200,000 watts, it was operating at one-tenth that due to equipment shortages, and the studios, formerly used by KMBC radio, were not complete, making the station completely dependent on filmed programs. Empire also planned to launch similar UHF stations in Indianapolis (channel 67) and Denver (channel 26). Progressively, more network programs were added to the schedule.

The new UHF station's affiliations with other television networks proved to be short-lived as the VHF station battles were cleared up and the networks secured affiliations with stations that could be received by all television sets. CBS found a VHF home on August 2, with the launch of the share-time operation of KMBC-TV and WHB-TV on channel 9; ABC migrated to VHF on September 27, when KCMO-TV began on channel 5. In late August, KCTY became a basic DuMont affiliate. It also began to expand its schedule and add new studio shows, such as the children's program Share the Fun with host Sue Bowen, as well as local newscasts and live high school football telecasts.

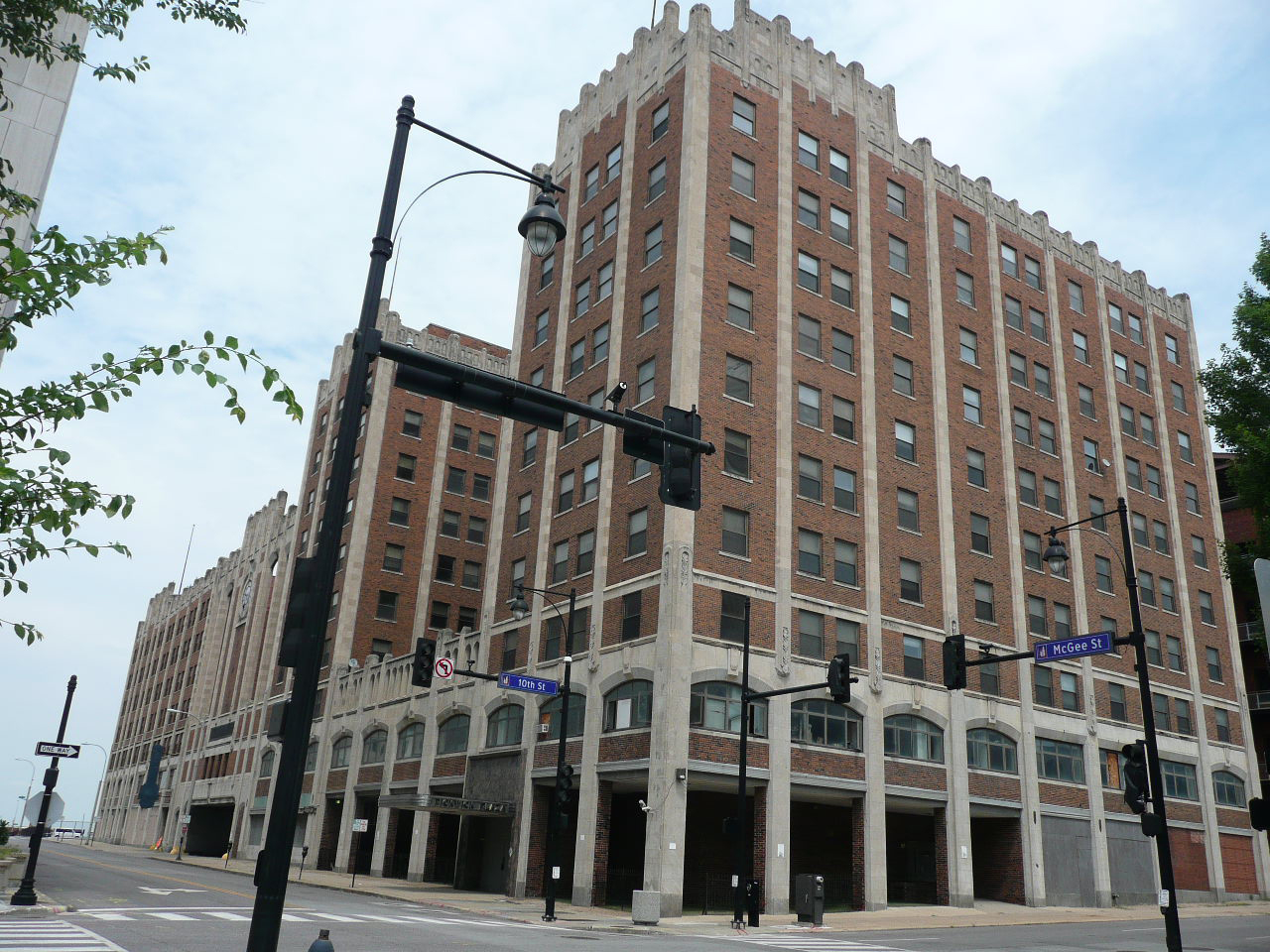
The former KMBC radio studios in the Pickwick Hotel in Kansas City were converted for use by KCTY.

Despite this, the station's financial picture worsened considerably; there were 353,000 VHF receivers in Kansas City but just 52,000 UHF-converted and all-channel sets. Herbert Mayer, the president of Empire Coil, first attempted to put the station on the market, but not even asking buyers to name a price attracted any offers. He then thought to close the station before 1953 was over in order to take the loss on the year's taxes. Instead, worried that such a decision might be detrimental to the future of UHF television, he instead sold KCTY for one dollar to the DuMont network itself in a transaction approved by the FCC in a special meeting on December 31, 1953, giving the company its fourth station. The $1 nominal purchase price was the lowest ever for a TV station; when KMO-TV in Tacoma, Washington, and its AM counterpart were to be sold for $350,000 that same month, Television Digest noted that that deal was the next-smallest in TV history.

DuMont announced that it had purchased KCTY in order to provide it support and also in order to study the problems ailing UHF stations at the time; it also declared that it would begin a major marketing program to encourage UHF conversions and give it priority for a higher-power transmitter to be built by DuMont Laboratories. DuMont became the first television network to own and operate a UHF television station, while Empire Coil took a $750,000 loss on KCTY. Empire Coil subsequently sold itself, along with its two remaining stations, to Storer Broadcasting; while Mayer said the sale was made for family considerations, Broadcasting-Telecasting suggested it was also due to weakening demand for its electronics products and the television station's financial failure. Empire also surrendered the construction permits for the Indianapolis and Denver UHF stations.

DuMont's study did not last long. On February 12, DuMont announced it would close KCTY at the end of the month on February 28, with Allen B. DuMont noting, "Sound business judgment forces us to this decision." In a letter addressed "to all television broadcasters", DuMont cited a myriad of factors: the fact that three VHF stations generally satisfied the television needs of most Kansas City viewers and advertisers; the reluctance of viewers to convert their sets to receive UHF; and resistance to the erection of outdoor antennas required to receive the station, which DuMont characterized as more pronounced in Kansas City "than in any other area of which we have knowledge". DuMont also announced it would sign with a VHF station to air its programs, with KCMO-TV assuming DuMont network programs upon the station's closure. KCTY was just the third UHF station of 130 to have gone on the air to fold, after WROV-TV in Roanoke, Virginia, and WBES-TV in Buffalo, New York.

DuMont offered the facilities for sale for $95,000, and one group investigated possible use of the plant by an educational television station, though this did not materialize. No commercial UHF station would be proposed for channel 25 until 1964, when a consortium from Chicago filed an application for a construction permit. A second application was filed in May 1965 by the Allied Broadcasting Company, which was approved but only after two revisions of the UHF table of allocations meant their new station, KCIT-TV, would broadcast on channel 50 when it signed on in October 1969.
