= KMCI-TV =

Television station in Lawrence, Kansas

ATSC 3.0 station
- Lawrence, Kansas; Kansas City, Missouri; United States
- City: Lawrence, Kansas
- Channels: Digital: 25 (UHF); Virtual: 38
- Branding: The Spot — Kansas City 38

Programming
- Affiliations: 38.1: Independent; for others, see § Subchannels

Ownership
- Owner: E. W. Scripps Company; (Scripps Broadcasting Holdings LLC)
- Sister stations: KSHB-TV

History
- First air date: February 1, 1988
- Former call signs: KMCI (1988–2010)
- Former channel numbers: Analog: 38 (UHF, 1988–2009); Digital: 36 (UHF, 2001–2009), 41 (UHF, 2009–2019)
- Former affiliations: HSN (1988–1996); Fox Kids (1999–2002); FoxBox/4KidsTV (2002–2008)
- Call sign meaning: MCI = Kansas City's IATA airport code

Technical information
- Licensing authority: FCC
- Facility ID: 42636
- ERP: 1,000 kW
- HAAT: 306 m (1,004 ft)
- Transmitter coordinates: 38°58′42″N 94°32′1.8″W

Links
- Public license information: Public file; LMS
- Website: www.kshb.com/thespot-kansascity38

KMCI-TV (channel 38), branded as The Spot – Kansas City 38, is an independent television station licensed to Lawrence, Kansas, United States, serving the Kansas City metropolitan area. It is owned by the E. W. Scripps Company alongside NBC affiliate KSHB-TV (channel 41). The two stations share studios on Oak Street in Kansas City, Missouri; KMCI-TV's transmitter is located at the Blue River Greenway in the city's Hillcrest section.

Channel 38 went on the air on February 1, 1988, broadcasting the Home Shopping Network (HSN) from a tower near Lawrence and owned by Miller Broadcasting. After a change in HSN's format to over-the-air stations, the Millers sued HSN for breach of contract and won. They signed a local marketing agreement with Scripps in 1996 to provide channel 38's programming; the station was relaunched with a family-oriented general-entertainment independent station format known as 38 Family Greats, utilizing programming in KSHB's inventory that had been discontinued when the station became an NBC affiliate. Scripps acquired the license outright in 2000 after the legalization of duopolies and renamed the station 38 The Spot in 2003, when it moved its transmitter to Kansas City. It offers morning and noon newscasts from KSHB-TV as well as local sports events. KMCI-TV is one of two ATSC 3.0 (NextGen TV) stations in the Kansas City market.

== History ==
=== Early years ===
Channel 38 was assigned to Lawrence, Kansas, by the Federal Communications Commission (FCC) on June 22, 1982. The group that had filed for the channel to be added, Doris and Monte Miller's Miller Broadcasting, filed, as did three other applicants: Georgia-based Kansas Family TV Ltd., Tennessee-based Horizons Communications 38 Ltd., and Denning Santee Communications. The Millers settled with the Georgia and Tennessee groups and bought out Denning Santee, clearing the way for the FCC to award a construction permit to Miller Broadcasting in December 1984.

After plans to locate studio facilities in Lenexa, Kansas, fell through, KMCI-TV set up in Overland Park. In September 1987, it announced it would air home shopping programming instead of being a general-entertainment independent station. Monte Miller specifically cited the bankruptcy proceeding involving KZKC (channel 62, now KSMO-TV) and its parent, Media Central, as a reason to avoid the format: "We don't have to go outside our market to see what happens. You can't overlook the fact that the parent corporation is in Chapter 11 bankruptcy. If either Channel 62 or Media Central is in trouble ... then I don't see bringing another station in and trying to go over the same ground and ending up the same way." In November, it affiliated with the Home Shopping Network (HSN).

KMCI-TV began broadcasting on February 1, 1988. While airing almost exclusively home shopping programs kept overhead low, it also kept the station off local cable systems, which already offered shopping channels in agreements that gave them a cut of revenue from local viewers. In late 1989, KMCI-TV experimented with offering syndicated, non–home shopping programming. However, Monte Miller decided against changing formats due to the cost of syndicated programs.

In 1995, HSN changed its format and took away time that local stations had previously been able to sell themselves. The Millers sued the network for breach of contract and won. They also began looking for a new partner to program KMCI-TV.

=== Scripps operation and ownership ===
In March 1996, KSHB owner Scripps-Howard Broadcasting reached a deal to manage KMCI under a local marketing agreement. That August, KMCI then dropped much of its home shopping programming and rebranded as "38 Family Greats", with a family-oriented general entertainment format from 6 a.m. to midnight. The new KMCI lineup included an inventory of programs that KSHB owned but had not had time to air after it switched to NBC in 1994.

Exercising an option from the 1996 pact with Miller, Scripps bought KMCI outright for $14.6 million in 2000, forming a legal duopoly with KSHB. In 2002, KMCI dropped the "Family Greats" branding and simply branded by its channel number. In July 2003, coinciding with the move of its transmitter site from Lawrence toward Kansas City, the station officially rebranded as "38 the Spot".

During the COVID-19 pandemic and school closures in 2020, Scripps partnered with Kansas City Public Schools to air a daily program, KCPS Homeroom, produced by the school district for its students on KMCI. In the mid-2020s, Scripps expanded use of "The Spot" branding to other independent stations in its portfolio, such as WXPX-TV in Tampa Bay.

== Programming ==
=== Newscasts ===
In 2000, KSHB-TV began producing a half-hour 9 p.m. newscast on KMCI to compete with the in-house newscast in that timeslot on WDAF-TV. The program was canceled in 2003, one week after KMCI's rebranding as "38 The Spot".

On April 6, 2015, KMCI began airing a third hour of KSHB 41 News Today from 7 to 8 a.m., after KSHB begins airing NBC's Today show. At the time, the station also simulcast an hour of the Border Patrol morning show on sports radio station WHB (810 AM). As of September 2025, KMCI-TV aired a weekday noon newscast and a 7 p.m. Saturday news hour.

=== Sports programming ===
Shortly after becoming 38 The Spot, the station launched a sports talk show, 38 Sports Spot, which ran from 2003 to 2008. For much of that time period, the station also had rights to a package of Kansas City Royals baseball games.

On November 6, 2013, KSHB-TV/KMCI-TV announced a deal with Sporting Kansas City to broadcast up to 26 regular-season games from the Major League Soccer (MLS) club on KMCI-TV, as well as several specials throughout the season and pre-game and post-game shows, beginning with the 2014 season. The team had previously been telecast by KMCI in 1997, when it was known as the Kansas City Wiz. The deal ran through 2016; beginning in 2017, all Sporting KC matches moved to Fox Sports Kansas City. For the 2022 season, Sporting KC returned to KMCI; this was the last year of local TV rights deals in MLS, as the league's 10-year deal with Apple supplanted all local contracts in 2023.

In 2018, KMCI and the University of Kansas struck a deal where KMCI would broadcast one early-season football game and several early-season Kansas Jayhawks men's basketball games, women's basketball home games, and other select sporting events from the university. The move was part of expanded distribution of the university's Tier 3 athletic events.

The Kansas City Chiefs announced in 2019 that KMCI and KSHB would replace KCTV as the team's official broadcast partners, allowing access to team programming, including preseason contests, plus marketing opportunities.

Prior to the 2022 season, KMCI announced an agreement with the Kansas City Current of the National Women's Soccer League to be the team's local broadcast partner. Beginning with the 2024 season, games aired nationally on Ion Television, which Scripps owns, are simulcast on the station.

In 2024, KMCI and sister station KSHB announced an agreement with the University of Missouri–Kansas City to air select men's and women's basketball games. KMCI also broadcasts games of the Kansas City Comets of the Major Arena Soccer League.

== Technical information ==
=== Subchannels ===
KMCI-TV's transmitter is located at the Blue River Greenway in the Hillcrest section of Kansas City, Missouri. The station's ATSC 1.0 channels are carried on the multiplexed signals of KSHB-TV and WDAF-TV, which it in turn broadcasts in ATSC 3.0 (NextGen TV) format:

Subchannels provided by KMCI-TV (ATSC 1.0)
Subchannel	Res.	Short name	Programming	ATSC 1.0 host
38.1	720p	KMCI-TV	Main KMCI-TV programming	KSHB-TV
38.2	480i	Bounce	Bounce TV	KSHB-TV
38.3	480i	CourtTV	Court TV	WDAF-TV
38.4	480i	QVC365	QVC365	WDAF-TV

Subchannels of KMCI-TV (ATSC 3.0)
Subchannel	Res.	Short name	Programming
4.1	1080p	WDAF	Fox (WDAF-TV)
19.1	1080p	KCPT	PBS (KCPT)
38.1	1080p	KMCI	Main KMCI-TV programming
41.1	1080p	KSHB	NBC (KSHB-TV)

Subchannel broadcast with digital rights management

The tower constructed in 2003 was designed to provide digital service for KMCI-TV and KSHB-TV. KMCI-TV shut down its analog signal, over UHF channel 38, on the official digital television transition date of June 12, 2009. The station's digital signal moved from its pre-transition UHF channel 36 to channel 41 for post-transition operations. As part of the FCC's repack, KMCI-TV moved to channel 25 in 2019.

On August 24, 2021, KMCI-TV converted to ATSC 3.0 (NextGen TV) broadcasting as one of two 3.0 transmitters in Kansas City alongside KSMO-TV. KMCI-TV hosts the main subchannels of KSHB-TV and WDAF-TV; those stations in turn broadcast its five subchannels in ATSC 1.0 format.
