= Fairway, Kansas =

- City
- Location within Johnson County and Kansas
- Interactive map of Fairway, Kansas
- Coordinates: 39°1′26″N 94°37′45″W
- Country: United States
- State: Kansas
- County: Johnson
- Founded: 1930s
- Incorporated: 1949

Government
  - Mayor: Melanie Hepperly

Area
  - Total: 1.13 sq mi (2.92 km^{2})
  - Land: 1.13 sq mi (2.92 km^{2})
  - Water: 0 sq mi (0.00 km^{2})
- Elevation: 955 ft (291 m)

Population (2020)
  - Total: 4,170
  - Density: 3,700/sq mi (1,430/km^{2})
- Time zone: UTC-6 (CST)
  - Summer (DST): UTC-5 (CDT)
- ZIP Code: 66205
- Area code: 913
- FIPS code: 20-22700
- GNIS ID: 485573
- Website: fairwaykansas.org

Fairway is a city in Johnson County, Kansas, United States. As of the 2020 United States census, the city population was 4,170. It is included in the Kansas City metropolitan area census designation and the Shawnee Mission postal services designation.

== History ==
For millennia, the Great Plains of North America were inhabited by nomadic Native Americans. In the 1820s, the federal government reserved this area for use by the Shawnee people, who had ceded their lands east of the Mississippi River to the United States. In 1839, Methodists established the Shawnee Methodist Mission here to operate a school for the Shawnee and try to convert them to Christianity. Later it was named the Shawnee Indian Manual Labor School and also accepted Native American boarding students, then closed in 1862. The site is now owned by the Kansas Historical Society, designated as a National Historic Landmark, and is operated by the city of Fairway as a museum.

In the 1930s, as Kansas City suburbs were developing, a developer named J.C. Nichols. laid out a subdivision near a golf course. It was named Fairway from its proximity to several driving ranges. Fairway was incorporated in 1949 and is known as "The City of Trees".

Fairway formed its own police force in 1949 with the appointment of a town marshal. This position was succeeded by police chiefs.

== Geography ==
According to the United States Census Bureau, the city has a total area of 1.15 square miles (2.98 km^{2}), all land.

== Demographics ==
Historical population
| Census | Pop. | Note | %± |
|---|---|---|---|
| 1950 | 1,816 | | — |
| 1960 | 5,398 | | 197.2% |
| 1970 | 5,227 | | −3.2% |
| 1980 | 4,619 | | −11.6% |
| 1990 | 4,173 | | −9.7% |
| 2000 | 3,952 | | −5.3% |
| 2010 | 3,882 | | −1.8% |
| 2020 | 4,170 | | 7.4% |
U.S. Decennial Census

=== Racial and ethnic composition ===
Fairway city, Kansas – Racial and ethnic composition Note: the US Census treats Hispanic/Latino as an ethnic category. This table excludes Latinos from the racial categories and assigns them to a separate category. Hispanics/Latinos may be of any race.
| Race / Ethnicity (NH = Non-Hispanic) | Pop 2000 | Pop 2010 | Pop 2020 | % 2000 | % 2010 | % 2020 |
|---|---|---|---|---|---|---|
| White alone (NH) | 3,750 | 3,610 | 3,681 | 94.89% | 92.99% | 88.27% |
| Black or African American alone (NH) | 12 | 29 | 36 | 0.30% | 0.75% | 0.86% |
| Native American or Alaska Native alone (NH) | 12 | 8 | 4 | 0.30% | 0.21% | 0.10% |
| Asian alone (NH) | 49 | 56 | 84 | 1.24% | 1.44% | 2.01% |
| Native Hawaiian or Pacific Islander alone (NH) | 0 | 0 | 1 | 0.00% | 0.00% | 0.02% |
| Other race alone (NH) | 8 | 8 | 16 | 0.20% | 0.21% | 0.38% |
| Mixed race or Multiracial (NH) | 33 | 54 | 160 | 0.84% | 1.39% | 3.84% |
| Hispanic or Latino (any race) | 88 | 117 | 188 | 2.23% | 3.01% | 4.51% |
| Total | 3,952 | 3,882 | 4,170 | 100.00% | 100.00% | 100.00% |

=== 2020 census ===
As of the 2020 census, Fairway had a population of 4,170 people, with 1,755 households and 1,154 families. The population density was 3,693.5 per square mile (1,426.1/km^{2}). There were 1,822 housing units at an average density of 1,613.8 per square mile (623.1/km^{2}).

The median age was 39.0 years. 23.4% of residents were under the age of 18, 5.4% were from 18 to 24, 30.1% were from 25 to 44, 23.5% were from 45 to 64, and 17.6% were 65 years of age or older. For every 100 females there were 92.6 males, and for every 100 females age 18 and over there were 89.5 males age 18 and over.

100.0% of residents lived in urban areas, while 0.0% lived in rural areas.

There were 1,755 households in Fairway, of which 32.2% had children under the age of 18 living in them. Of all households, 57.1% were married-couple households, 14.1% were households with a male householder and no spouse or partner present, and 24.4% were households with a female householder and no spouse or partner present. About 28.1% of all households were made up of individuals and 11.7% had someone living alone who was 65 years of age or older. The average household size was 2.4 and the average family size was 3.2.

Of all housing units, 3.7% were vacant. The homeowner vacancy rate was 1.6% and the rental vacancy rate was 2.3%.

Racial composition as of the 2020 census
| Race | Number | Percent |
|---|---|---|
| White | 3,751 | 90.0% |
| Black or African American | 38 | 0.9% |
| American Indian and Alaska Native | 6 | 0.1% |
| Asian | 84 | 2.0% |
| Native Hawaiian and Other Pacific Islander | 1 | 0.0% |
| Some other race | 28 | 0.7% |
| Two or more races | 262 | 6.3% |

=== Demographic estimates ===
The percent of those with a bachelor's degree or higher was estimated to be 52.4% of the population.

=== Income and poverty ===
The 2016–2020 5-year American Community Survey estimates show that the median household income was $120,162 (with a margin of error of +/- $12,460) and the median family income was $174,543 (+/- $53,120). Males had a median income of $78,487 (+/- $25,661) versus $56,063 (+/- $18,070) for females. The median income for those above 16 years old was $66,552 (+/- $10,056). Approximately, 3.8% of families and 3.1% of the population were below the poverty line, including 0.0% of those under the age of 18 and 7.8% of those ages 65 or over.

=== 2010 census ===
As of the census of 2010, there were 3,882 people, 1,749 households, and 1,062 families residing in the city. The population density was 3,375.7 inhabitants per square mile (1,303.4/km^{2}). There were 1,833 housing units at an average density of 1,593.9 per square mile (615.4/km^{2}). The racial makeup of the city was 95.3% White, 0.8% African American, 0.3% Native American, 1.4% Asian, 0.7% from other races, and 1.4% from two or more races. Hispanic or Latino of any race were 3.0% of the population.

There were 1,749 households, of which 27.0% had children under the age of 18 living with them, 52.0% were married couples living together, 6.8% had a female householder with no husband present, 1.9% had a male householder with no wife present, and 39.3% were non-families. 31.6% of all households were made up of individuals, and 9.8% had someone living alone who was 65 years of age or older. The average household size was 2.22 and the average family size was 2.83.

The median age in the city was 41.4 years. 21.8% of residents were under the age of 18; 4.5% were between the ages of 18 and 24; 28.4% were from 25 to 44; 30.6% were from 45 to 64; and 14.8% were 65 years of age or older. The gender makeup of the city was 47.0% male and 53.0% female.

== Education ==
The Johnson County Library services Fairway. The library has 13 locations in Johnson County.

== Notable people ==
Notable individuals who were born in or have lived in Fairway include:

- W. Bruce Cameron (born 1956), American author, columnist, and humorist
- Frank L. Hagaman (1894–1966), 31st Governor of Kansas
- Greg Orman (born 1968), Kansas Gubernatorial Candidate
- Melissa Rooker (born 1964), Kansas state legislator
- Eleanor Smart (born 1995), high diver
