= List of KSDK awards =

KSDK has won a multitude of awards including Regional Emmys, Gabriel Awards, and Regional Edward R. Murrow Awards; KSDK has also been recognized by the National Association of Black Journalists and the Associated Press.

== 2003 ==
In 2003, KSDK was awarded the WeatheRate seal of approval, an award that certifies KSDK as the most accurate weather station in St. Louis. The data used to determine a winner is refigured every 6 months by the non-profit WeatheRate organization. Also in 2003, KSDK was awarded 14 Regional Emmy Awards:

- News Feature-Entertainment/Humorous: (Steve Jankowski: "Arch Light")
- News Feature-Political: (Randy Jackson: "Words of a Nation")
- Sports Report: (Malcolm Briggs: "Emily Parsons")
- Editorial/Commentary: (Mike Bush: "My Turn")
- Religious: (Dan Gray: "Higher Calling")
- Live Event Special: (Mike Bush & Frank Cusumano: "Ozzie Smith-Call to the Hall")
- Promotion: News: ("People you Know")
- Public Service Announcement: ("Warner's Warm-Up")
- Weathercaster: (Cindy Preszler)
- Photographer/Videographer: Pre-Produced News
- Writing: Promo/PSA/Commercial: ("Now More Than Ever 2")
- Art Direction/Design: News: ("Technicolor")
- Animation: ("Velocity")
- Audio: ("Cards Retro")

In 2003, KSDK was awarded one Regional Edward R. Murrow Award:

- Overall Excellence

== 2004 ==
In 2004, KSDK was awarded 20 Regional Emmy Awards:

- Interactivity: (Leisa Zigman: "Cutting")
- Community Outreach Program: ("A Place to Call Home")
- Religious: (Chris Balish: "Cross By the Road")
- Host/Reporter (Other Than News): (Heidi Glaus)
- Art Direction/Design: News: ("Analgamation")
- Editor: Pre-Produced News
- Photographer/Videographer: Pre-Produced News
- News Feature-Business/Consumer/Finance: (Wendy Erikson: "Clock Shop")
- News Feature-Culture: (Randy Jackson: "Eyes of the Holocaust")
- News Feature-Culture: (Randy Jackson: "Cover Story: Forgotten Heroes")
- Sports Feature: (Frank Cusumano: "Oldest QB")
- Sports Program: (Frank Cusumano: "SportsPlus")
- Sports Special: (Rene Knott: "Winging It, Cardinals 2004")
- Sports Special: (Malcolm Briggs: Max Questions-Rams 2003")
- Writing: (Chris Balish)
- Spot News: (Ann Rubin: "The Fugitive")
- Spot News: (Ann Rubin: "We Had to get Them Out")
- Weathercaster: (John Fuller (meteorologist)|John Fuller)
- Weathercaster: (Mike Roberts)
- Sportscaster: (Frank Cusumano)

In 2004, KSDK was awarded a Regional Edward R. Murrow Award:

- Overall Excellence

== 2005 ==
In 2005, Karen Foss was inducted into the Silver Circle for her 25 years of journalistic excellence. Also in 2005, KSDK was awarded 15 Regional Emmy Awards:

- Special Reporting-Feature: (Randy Jackson: "The Enemy Among Us")
- Special Reporting-Political: (Mike Bush: "Images of War")
- General News Report: (Randy Jackson: "Covert Task Force")
- Children's/Teen: ("Cardinals Crew")
- Community Outreach Program: ("Tsunami Relief, St. Louis Responds")
- Promotion-News: ("The Story Behind the Story")
- Promotion-Programming: ("Greek Lessons")
- Commercial Spot: ("Back to Bed")
- Sportscaster: (Frank Cusumano)
- Host/Reporter (Other Than News): (Chris Balish)
- Photographer/Videographer-Pre-Produced News
- Editor-Same Day News
- Editor-Pre-Produced News
- Graphics-News
- Graphics-Promo/PSA/Commercial: ("Flashback 5")
- Animation: ("Professor Pixel's Percolating Party")
- Audio: ("Scott Suppelsa Audio Composite")

In 2005, KSDK was awarded three Regional Edward R. Murrow Awards:

- Sports Reporting
- Videography
- Affiliated Website

== 2006 ==
Jennifer Blome and Art Holliday were both inducted into the Silver Circle for their outstanding achievements in the television industry.
