= Steve Savard =

American sports announcer

- Born: St. Louis, Missouri
- Occupations: Sportscaster and news anchor

Steve Savard is an American sports anchor and the former "Voice of the St. Louis Rams", serving in that role from 1999 to 2015. He was the lead news anchor and former sportscaster at KMOV in St. Louis, Missouri. Savard, a St. Louis native, attended Parkway North High School and Northwest Missouri State University, where he graduated in 1986 with degrees in English and journalism. Steve has won six Emmy Awards, including best sportscaster.

After serving as a sportswriter for the Suburban Newspapers chain in St. Louis, Savard broke into television in 1989 as a reporter and weekend news anchor at KULR-TV in Billings, Montana. His early career included stints as sports director at KDBC-TV in El Paso, Texas (1990–1992) and weekend sports anchor at WVIT in Hartford, Connecticut (1993–1994).

KMOV in St. Louis hired Savard in 1994 as weekend sports anchor. Within a year, he was promoted to sports director upon the resignation of Zip Rzeppa.

Savard succeeded Gary Bender as the "Voice of the Rams" in 1999 (the season in which they won Super Bowl XXXIV) and was succeeded upon the Rams' move back to Los Angeles after 2015 by J. B. Long.

In February 2013, Savard made the switch from sports back to news and began anchoring KMOV's 10 p.m. newscast. In May 2013, he added the 6:00 p.m. newscast to his duties at KMOV. Savard was among 16 people laid off from KMOV on September 17, 2020; the station cited that the cuts were due to the COVID-19 pandemic. He was hired by KOLR in Springfield, Missouri, on May 14, 2021. He served as lead anchor and substitute announcer on Missouri State Bears football broadcasts in Springfield. His contract expired in May 2025, and he returned to St. Louis. In February 2026, he began reporting a weekly series on veterans for KSDK in St. Louis. The station named him main evening anchor that July, following the retirement of longtime St. Louis anchor Mike Bush.
