= KETC =

Television station in St. Louis

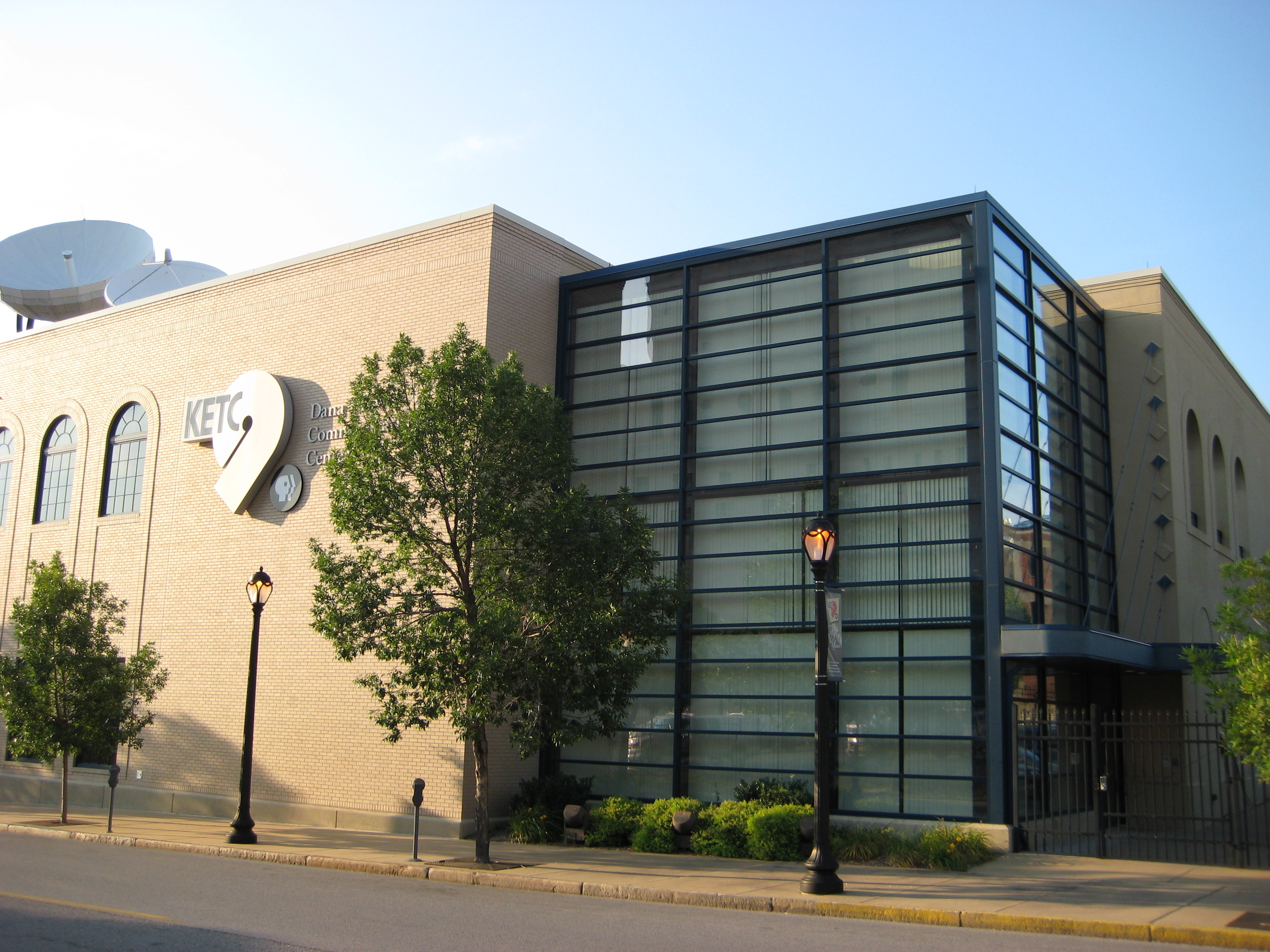
- St. Louis, Missouri; United States
- Channels: Digital: 23 (UHF); Virtual: 9
- Branding: Nine PBS

Programming
- Affiliations: 9.1: PBS; for others, see § Subchannels

Ownership
- Owner: St. Louis Regional Public Media, Inc.

History
- First air date: September 20, 1954
- Former channel numbers: Analog: 9 (VHF, 1954–2009); Digital: 39 (UHF, 2002–2018)
- Former affiliations: NET (1954–1970)
- Call sign meaning: St. Louis Educational Television Commission (former name for St. Louis Regional Public Media)

Technical information
- Licensing authority: FCC
- Facility ID: 62182
- ERP: 300 kW
- HAAT: 331 m (1,086 ft)
- Transmitter coordinates: 38°28′56″N 90°23′53″W

Links
- Public license information: Public file; LMS
- Website: www.ninepbs.org

KETC (channel 9) is a PBS member television station in St. Louis, Missouri, United States, owned by St. Louis Regional Public Media. The station's studios are located at the Dana Brown Communications Center on Olive Street in St. Louis' Grand Center neighborhood, and its transmitter is located in south St. Louis County.

== History ==
The station first signed on the air on September 20, 1954. It was the first community-licensed educational television station in the United States. The station's first general manager was Charles Guggenheim, who hired the technical staff and first group of producer/director/writers, five in all. While waiting for the broadcasting tower to be completed, a number of programs were recorded using kinescope recording technology (the same as used for The Honeymooners). Once on the air, there were a number of award-winning programs produced by Mayo Simon, Bill Hartzell, Ran Lincoln and Guggenheim. They included the first live broadcast of the St. Louis City Council. Another featured the St. Louis Post-Dispatch nature columnist Leonard Hall of Possum Trot Farm. Among the taped program series was a pioneering science program intended for sixth graders to see in their classrooms, Science in Sight, produced by Martin L. Schneider. Film making was encouraged, and with Len Hall's collaboration a documentary film about the rare beauty of the relatively unprotected Current River was produced. It was later used by the National Audubon Society in the successful effort to make Current River the first National Scenic River under the protection of the National Park Service.

Soon after the station went live, its emphasis on current affairs and local politics, fostered by Guggenheim, rattled the political leaders. Following a public controversy, covered by the Post-Dispatch, and under the influence of the well-connected local public relations firm Fleishman and Hillard (now FleishmanHillard), Guggenheim was replaced by Martin Quigley, who had no experience in broadcasting. A few months later, Shelby Storck was hired. An experienced broadcaster recommended by Guggenheim, he emceed the station's first evening of broadcasting.

KETC originally broadcast from temporary studios in McMillan Hall on the campus of Washington University in St. Louis, with transmitting facilities atop the former Boatmen's Bank Building (now the Marquette Building) in downtown St. Louis. In 1955, it moved to the Julius and Freda Baer Memorial Building, also on the Washington University campus. It was the first facility specifically built for an educational television station. It activated its current tower in south St. Louis County in 1970, allowing it to begin color broadcasts a year later. In 1998, the station moved its studios from the Washington University campus to the Dana Brown Communications Center in the Grand Center district.

During the 2004 elections, KETC partnered with area NBC affiliate KSDK (channel 5) to provide St. Louisans with comprehensive and up-to-date local and national election results. This partnership was first utilized to simulcast a gubernatorial debate between Republican candidate Missouri Secretary of State Matt Blunt and Democratic candidate State Auditor Claire McCaskill. On election night (November 2), KSDK aired NBC's prime time election coverage with Tom Brokaw and Tim Russert as well as segments of local results. KETC, meanwhile, ran three hours of local election results hosted by KSDK anchors Mike Bush and Karen Foss. Viewers could also watch election results online on the websites of both stations.

The successful KETC/KSDK partnership was used again in September 2005 when, along with radio partners KYKY (98.1 FM) and KEZK-FM (102.5 FM), a telethon for Hurricane Katrina relief was simulcast that raised more than $5 million. The telethon featured an appearance by Affton native John Goodman, who now calls New Orleans home and whose family went missing for a time during the storm's peak. Kennett, Missouri, native Sheryl Crow and her then fiancé Lance Armstrong urged viewers to call when they were interviewed by phone from the region.

In May 2008, E! contracted with KETC to film two episodes of the cable network's weekly pop culture series The Soup at the KETC studios to accommodate host Joel McHale's filming of The Informant! in the St. Louis area. After being known for most of its history as "KETC 9," the station rebranded itself as "The Nine Network" in 2010. On October 13, 2010, the station partnered with the St. Louis Beacon, an online-only, non-profit news publication, to form the Public Insight Network, a citizen journalism initiative created in conjunction with American Public Media. On January 10, 2021, the station rebranded as Nine PBS, adopting the current PBS corporate logo.

KETC sued data warehousing company Iron Mountain Inc. in 2026 for access to 70 years worth of archived footage that the station owns but is housed in an Iron Mountain data center in the Denver area. Iron Mountain claims a third party that went out of business owned the system hosting KETC's data. A district judge in Denver issued a preliminary injunction prohibiting Iron Mountain from altering the material in any way.

== Programming ==
KETC is known among viewers in St. Louis for preempting PBS programs to air library program content or less controversial pledge drive programs, such as WQED-produced doo-wop specials, using the default network feed in late night to premiere those PBS programs instead, though St. Louis has traditionally had stations, commercial and non-commercial, preempt programming from their networks due to content. KETC has given some leeway as far as some preemptions, such as a case where St. Louis Post-Dispatch columnist Eric Mink wrote an editorial complaining about the station's scheduling of a pledge drive ice skating show instead of a PBS documentary on the September 11 attacks; KETC announced the next day that it would instead air the 9/11 documentary as nationally scheduled.

Some of the programs produced by KETC for national distribution include selected episodes of Inside/Out and Today in Chess, produced in cooperation with the Saint Louis Chess Club. The station also produced The Letter People, an instructional program about reading, which was seen on many PBS and educational television stations in the mid-1970s, as well as A Time for Champions, an hour-long documentary chronicling the Saint Louis University soccer dynasty of the 1960s and 1970s; and Homeland, a miniseries examining the topic of immigration in the United States. Local programming is highlighted by magazine series Living St. Louis, early-childhood focused Teaching in Room 9, and current affairs show Donnybrook, a weekly panel discussion featuring area media personalities airing on Thursday nights.

== Technical information ==
=== Subchannels ===
The station's digital signal is multiplexed:

Subchannels of KETC
Subchannel	Res.	Short name	Programming
9.1	1080i	KETC-HD	PBS
9.2	720p	KIDS	PBS Kids
9.3	480i	WORLD	World
9.4	480i	CREATE	Create

=== Analog-to-digital conversion ===
KETC shut down its analog signal, over VHF channel 9, on June 12, 2009, the official date on which full-power television stations in the United States transitioned from analog to digital broadcasts under federal mandate. The station's digital signal continued to broadcast on its pre-transition UHF channel 39, using virtual channel 9.
