= Grevenmacher =

Grevenmacher Gréiwemaacher (Luxembourgish)
- Commune
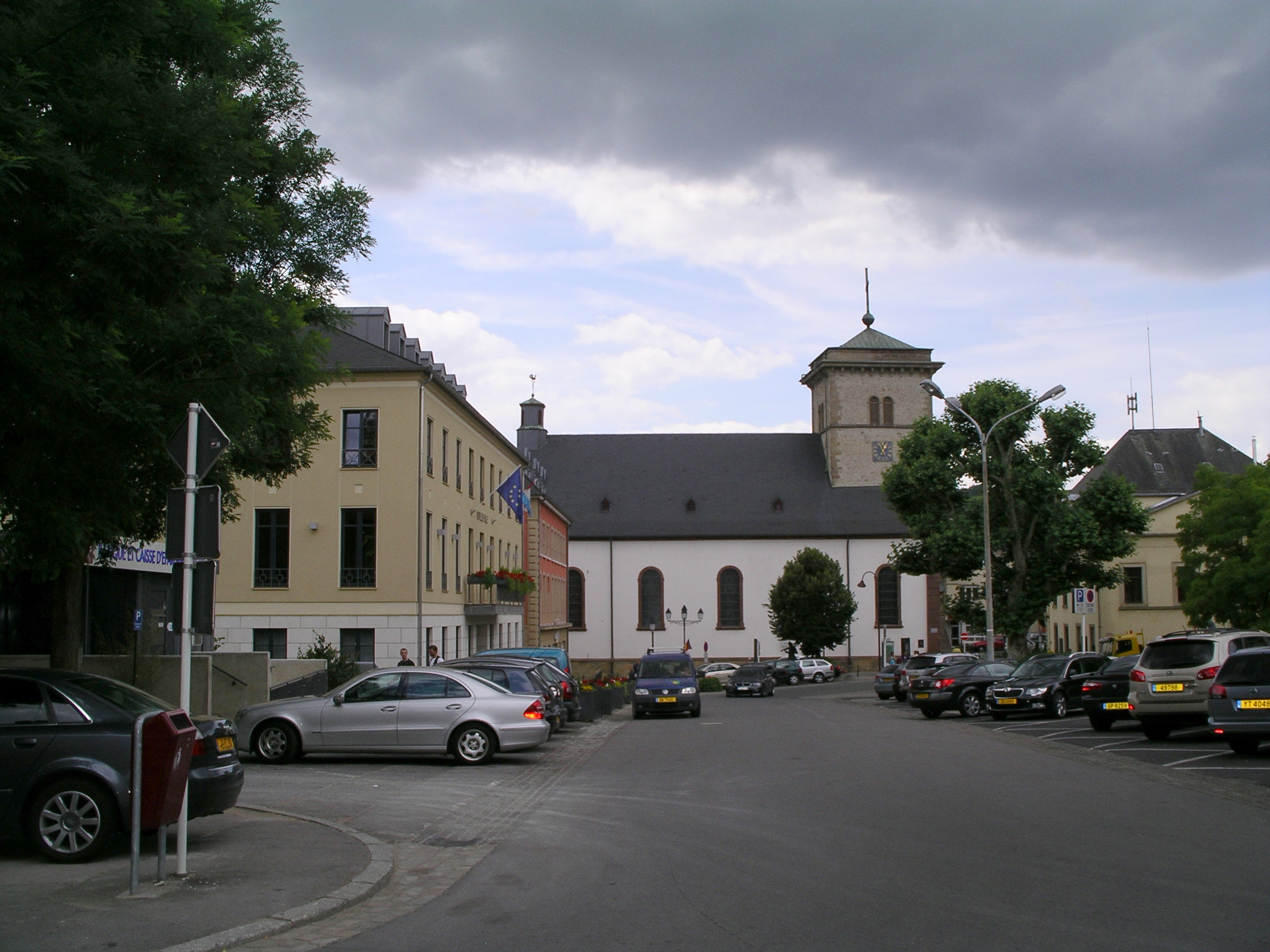

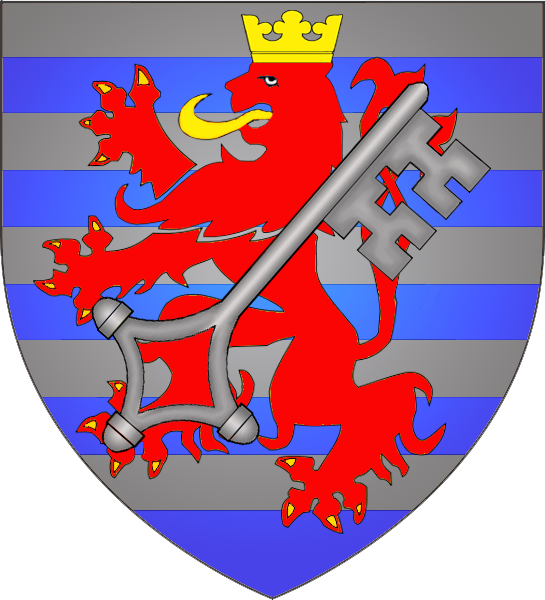
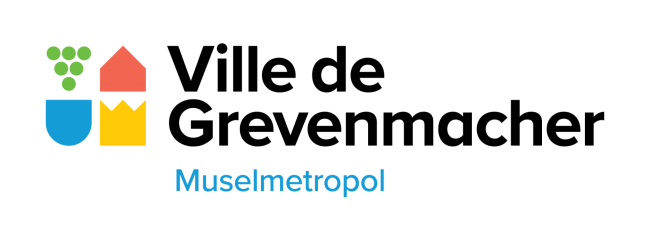
- Coat of arms Brandmark

- Map of Luxembourg with Grevenmacher highlighted in orange, and the canton in dark red
- Coordinates: 49.6806°N 6.4417°E
- Country: Luxembourg
- Canton: Grevenmacher

Government
  - Mayor: Monique Hermes

Area
  - Total: 16.48 km^{2} (6.36 sq mi)
  - Rank: 70th of 100
- Highest elevation: 315 m (1,033 ft)
  - Rank: 96th of 100
- Lowest elevation: 133 m (436 ft)
  - Rank: 2nd of 100

Population (2025)
  - Total: 5,274
  - Rank: 32nd of 100
  - Density: 320.0/km^{2} (828.9/sq mi)
  - Rank: 26th of 100
- Time zone: UTC+1 (CET)
  - Summer (DST): UTC+2 (CEST)
- LAU 2: LU0001104
- Website: grevenmacher.lu

Grevenmacher (German pronunciation: [ɡʁeːvn̩ˈmaxɐ]; Luxembourgish: Gréiwemaacher [ɡʀɜɪ̯vəˈmaːχɐ]) is a commune with city status in eastern Luxembourg, near the border with Germany. It gives its name to the canton of Grevenmacher, and, until its abolition in 2015, the district of Grevenmacher. The town is situated on the left bank of the river Moselle, in a wine-growing region.

As of 2025, the commune of Grevenmacher has a population of 5,276.

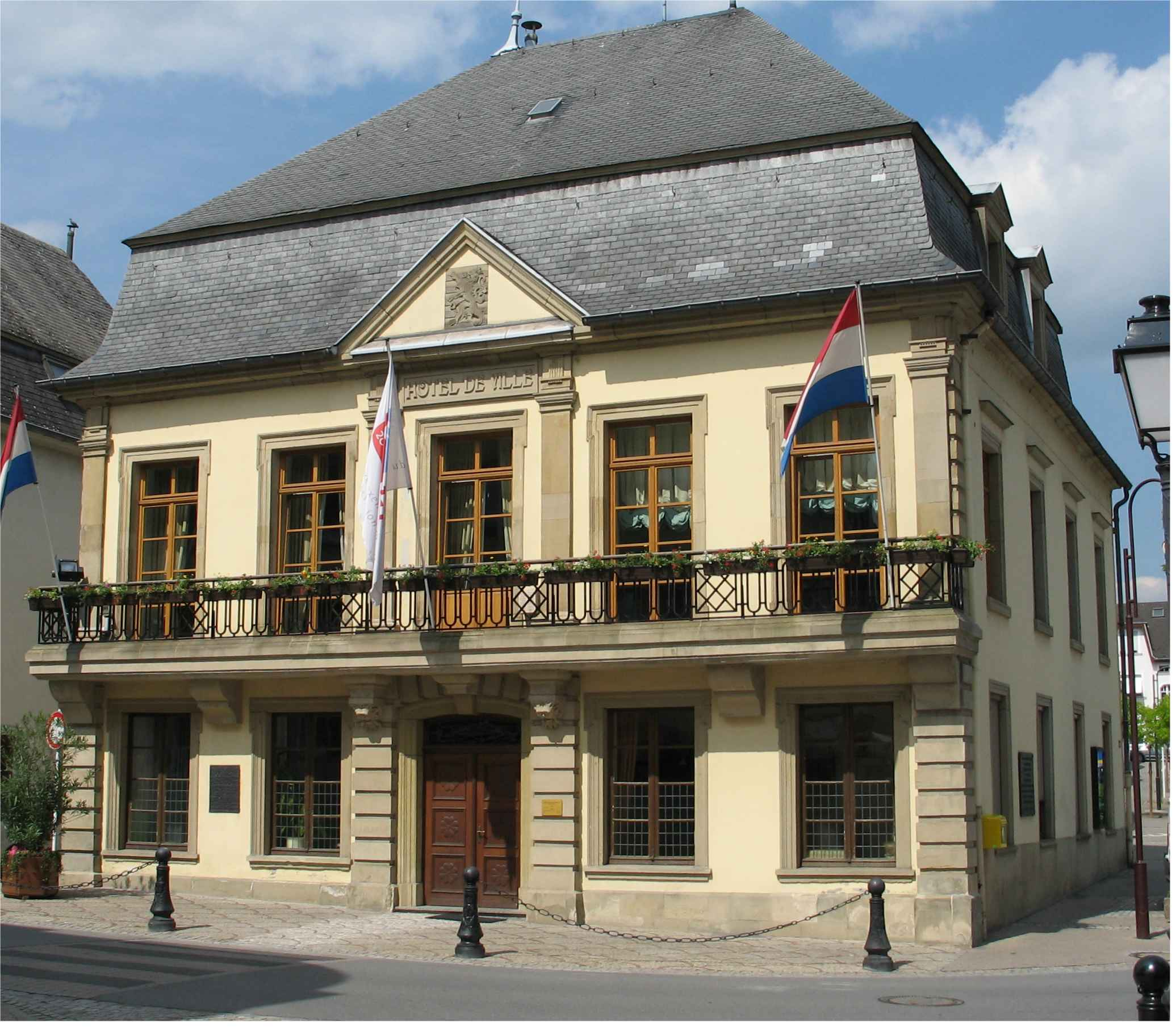
The old Town Hall

== Climate ==
Grevenmacher has an oceanic climate (Köppen Cfb). The annual average temperature is 10.6 °C (51.1 °F), the hottest month in July is 18.9 °C (66.0 °F), and the coldest month is 3.1 °C (37.6 °F) in January. The annual precipitation is 749.6 millimetres (29.51 in), of which December is the wettest with 85.0 millimetres (3.35 in), while April is the driest with only 45.2 millimetres (1.78 in). The extreme temperature throughout the year ranged from −17.4 °C (0.7 °F) on 19 December 2009 to 40.3 °C (104.5 °F) on 25 July 2019.

Climate data for Grevenmacher, 1991-2020 normals
Month	Jan	Feb	Mar	Apr	May	Jun	Jul	Aug	Sep	Oct	Nov	Dec	Year
Record high °C (°F)	14.3 (57.7)	20.0 (68.0)	22.9 (73.2)	29.1 (84.4)	32.8 (91.0)	36.4 (97.5)	40.3 (104.5)	39.2 (102.6)	34.2 (93.6)	27.6 (81.7)	21.4 (70.5)	16.2 (61.2)	40.3 (104.5)
Mean daily maximum °C (°F)	5.0 (41.0)	6.6 (43.9)	11.5 (52.7)	16.1 (61.0)	20.3 (68.5)	23.5 (74.3)	25.7 (78.3)	24.4 (75.9)	20.7 (69.3)	15.0 (59.0)	9.1 (48.4)	5.6 (42.1)	15.3 (59.5)
Daily mean °C (°F)	3.1 (37.6)	3.7 (38.7)	6.8 (44.2)	10.3 (50.5)	14.0 (57.2)	17.1 (62.8)	18.9 (66.0)	18.3 (64.9)	14.4 (57.9)	10.5 (50.9)	6.6 (43.9)	3.8 (38.8)	10.6 (51.1)
Mean daily minimum °C (°F)	−0.4 (31.3)	−0.3 (31.5)	1.8 (35.2)	4.2 (39.6)	8.1 (46.6)	11.3 (52.3)	13.2 (55.8)	12.7 (54.9)	9.5 (49.1)	6.6 (43.9)	3.2 (37.8)	0.7 (33.3)	5.9 (42.6)
Record low °C (°F)	−15.6 (3.9)	−16.4 (2.5)	−14.7 (5.5)	−6.7 (19.9)	−1.8 (28.8)	0.2 (32.4)	5.9 (42.6)	4.0 (39.2)	0.4 (32.7)	−5.8 (21.6)	−11.7 (10.9)	−17.4 (0.7)	−17.4 (0.7)
Average precipitation mm (inches)	67.3 (2.65)	56.3 (2.22)	49.1 (1.93)	45.2 (1.78)	63.6 (2.50)	65.0 (2.56)	65.6 (2.58)	61.0 (2.40)	58.0 (2.28)	67.7 (2.67)	65.9 (2.59)	85.0 (3.35)	749.6 (29.51)
Average precipitation days (≥ 1.0 mm)	11.0	9.8	9.6	8.5	9.3	10.0	9.7	9.2	8.1	10.1	11.4	13.4	120.1
Source: NOAA

== Population ==
Historical population

Year	Pop.	±%
1821	2,014	—
1851	2,760	+37.0%
1900	2,596	−5.9%
1910	2,766	+6.5%
1922	2,700	−2.4%
1935	2,811	+4.1%

Year	Pop.	±%
1947	2,543	−9.5%
1960	2,722	+7.0%
1970	2,918	+7.2%
1981	2,996	+2.7%
1990	2,996	+0.0%
2000	3,747	+25.1%

Year	Pop.	±%
2005	3,981	+6.2%
2010	4,260	+7.0%
2015	4,751	+11.5%
2020	4,936	+3.9%
2021	4,981	+0.9%

Source data

== Twin towns ==
Grevenmacher is twinned with:

- Aubière, France

== Notable people ==
- Frantz Seimetz (1858–1934) a Luxembourg Impressionist portrait and landscape artist
- Joseph Lortz (1887–1975) a Roman Catholic church historian, Reformation historian and ecumenist
- Anne-Marie Thekes (1907 in Grevenmacher - 1959), book seller, wife of painter Theodore Wildanger
- Rob Krier (1938-2023) a Luxembourgish sculptor, architect and urban designer
- Octavie Modert (born 1966) a politician from Luxembourg
- Monica Semedo (born 1984), former TV presenter, now politician and Member of the European Parliament since 2019

== See also ==
- Hagelsdorf
