= Julius Hunter =

American journalist and television news anchor

Julius Kelton Hunter is an American former journalist and television news anchor, best known for his tenures on two television stations in St. Louis: KSD-TV (now KSDK), the NBC affiliate in St. Louis, and KMOX-TV (now KMOV), the CBS affiliate in St. Louis. He worked as a news reporter and anchorman from 1970 to 2002.

== Early life ==
Hunter was born in St. Louis to Van and Lena Hunter. Under the tutelage of an older brother, Van, Julius began reading by the age of three. He graduated from Harris Teachers College, now Harris–Stowe State University.

== Career ==
Hunter began his post-college career as an eighth grade teacher at Hamilton Elementary School. Hunter was told that he would be teaching a sixth grade class after the summer break. When he arrived for Teacher Orientation that fall, to his surprise he was assigned to a self-contained classroom of 44 students. He was 21 years old; some of his students were already 16 and 17 years old.

He was then hired as the first African American copywriter at Foote Cone & Belding in Chicago, the third-largest advertising firm in the country at that time. He worked with a group that wrote TV commercials for such products as Dial Soap and deodorant, Raid house and garden spray, Kraft Italian macaroni dinners, and Kleenex/Kotex.

After a year, homesick Hunter returned to St. Louis in 1969 to take a job in the Student Affairs Department at Washington University. He was hired as director of a student outreach program called "Education in Action", and was appointed the housemaster of Umrath Hall, a dormitory housing 140 freshman women.

After a year at Washington University, Hunter entered a profession in which he turned out to be a pioneer for African American broadcast journalists. He was named as a reporter, then weekend anchor, then weekend news director at KSDK, the NBC affiliate in St. Louis. After nearly five years at Channel 5, Hunter left for expanded reporter and anchoring duties at KMOX-TV, the then owned and operated CBS television station in St. Louis. He became the first African American to anchor a prime time newscast in St. Louis when he began anchoring the six o’clock news.

Hunter served as the permanent host for radio station KFUO's "Young Heroes in Music" program which featured the virtuoso talents of young African American musicians. Hunter was also the host of the "Do the Right Thing" feature on Channel 4 for ten years. This program recognized the achievements and heroics of young people.

Hunter retired from broadcast news in November 2002, but was appointed by Saint Louis University (SLU) President, Father Lawrence Biondi, S.J., as the university’s first Vice President for Community Outreach. His mission was to engage the university and the outside community in symbiotic programs to benefit each.

While serving at SLU, Hunter was appointed in 2006 by Missouri Governor Matt Blunt to the five-member St. Louis Police Board for a four-year term. With the position came the honorary rank of colonel. Hunter retired from SLU in 2007. His term on the Police Board expired three years after that.

Hunter joined St. Louis Magazine in 2013.

After he researched and wrote a book on his family's history, Hunter, realizing that family root searches can be expensive ventures, raised several hundred thousand dollars from his own pocket and the contributions of individuals and corporations to open the Julius K. Hunter & Friends African American Research Collection at the St. Louis County Library. The collection includes books, census data, maps, slave ship records, and more.

Hunter has guest-directed the St. Louis Symphony Orchestra.

== Personal life ==
He has two daughters, who both are Harvard Honors graduates.

== Works ==
Hunter is the author of seven books that include a children’s alphabet book, a college textbook on broadcast news, and two coffee table books on the great mansions of St. Louis. One is Kingsbury Place: The First Two Hundred Years, and the other is Westmoreland and Portland Places: The History and Architecture of America's Premier Private Streets, 1888-1988.

Hunter wrote Honey Island, which traces his family roots back to the birth of his great-great grandfather as a slave born in 1825 in Kentucky. Hunter’s great-great grandfather, Ned Rounds, was a founder of the all-black town of Honey Island, Mississippi, where he became the town’s first banker.

His novel Priscilla and Babe: From Slavery's Shackles to Millionaire Bordello Madams in Victorian Saint Louis, was published in 2014.

Hunter’s memoir TV One-on-One features transcripts of his historic interviews with five United States Presidents along with behind the scenes stories about many of the celebrity interviews he conducted with Pearl Bailey, Ted Kennedy, Jimmy Hoffa, Sophia Loren, Cab Calloway, Milton Berle, Julia Child, Oprah Winfrey, Bette Midler, Ike Turner, and more.
