= KDTL-LD =

Television station in St. Louis

- St. Louis, Missouri; United States
- Channels: Digital: 17 (UHF); Virtual: 4.5, 32
- Branding: Matrix Midwest

Programming
- Affiliations: 4.5: Weather; 32.3: Independent; 32.4: Outlaw; 32.10: ABC

Ownership
- Owner: Gray Media; (Gray Television Licensee, LLC)
- Sister stations: KMOV

History
- Founded: April 2, 1990
- First air date: September 28, 1992
- Former call signs: K64DT (1990–2004); KDTL-LP (2004–2012)
- Former channel numbers: Analog: 64 (UHF, 1992–2008), 16 (UHF, 2008–2012); Digital: 16 (UHF, 2012–2022); Virtual: 17 (until 2023)
- Former affiliations: ValueVision/ShopNBC (1992–2004); Daystar (2004–2022); Circle (2022–2023); Infomercials (2023–2026)
- Call sign meaning: Daystar Television/St. Louis, for former owner

Technical information
- Licensing authority: FCC
- Facility ID: 69791
- Class: LD
- ERP: 15 kW
- HAAT: 250.5 m (822 ft)
- Transmitter coordinates: 38°31′47″N 90°17′58″W

Links
- Public license information: LMS

KDTL-LD (channel 32), branded as Matrix Midwest, is a low-power independent television station in St. Louis, Missouri, United States. It is owned by Gray Media alongside CBS and ABC affiliate KMOV (channel 4). Both stations broadcast from studios on Progress Parkway in suburban Maryland Heights and share transmitter facilities in Lemay, Missouri.

== History ==
The station began operations as K64DT on September 28, 1992. By 1993, it was broadcasting ValueVision home shopping. The station increased its power, changing its callsign to KDTL-LP in 2004 after being sold to Word of God Fellowship, the parent entity of the Daystar Television Network, to broadcast Daystar's programming. The station converted to digital operations at the end of 2011, and changed its call sign to KDTL-LD on January 5, 2012.

On May 9, 2022, it was announced that Word of God Fellowship would sell KDTL-LD to Atlanta-based Gray Television, which had acquired KMOV the year previous after purchasing Meredith's broadcast division and its stations, for $1 million; the sale was completed on July 1.

Following the consummation of the sale to Gray, the station dropped its affiliation with Daystar, as the network's programming was carried by full-power station WPXS (channel 13) since it purchased the station in 2010, and also duplicated in the inner core of St. Louis on in-market repeater KUMO-LD (channel 51). The station initially aired an automated feed of current weather conditions, forecasts, and observations from KMOV's weather computers in high definition on its second subchannel (mapped to channel 4.7, using KMOV's channel position), while its main channel (mapped to 4.6) carried Corner Store TV, an all-paid programming network, in a transition period while Gray acquired programming to place on it with its former affiliated network Circle winding down at the end of 2023.

== Subchannels ==
The station's signal is multiplexed:

Subchannels of KDTL-LD
Subchannel	Res.	Short name	Programming
4.5	720p	1stAlrt	First Alert Weather Now
32.3	720p	MATRIX	Matrix Midwest
32.4	480i	Outlaw	Outlaw
32.10	720p	ABC	ABC (KMOV)

Simulcast of subchannels of another station

Channels 32.1 and 32.2 (ABC and Matrix Midwest in 480i, respectively) are transmitted off of the KMOV multiplex.
