= Frank Eschen =

Frank Eschen (July 30, 1909 – March 25, 1960) was a radio and television broadcaster in Saint Louis, MO for 28 years during the middle of the 20th century. As a result, he became a well-known St. Louis area personality. He anchored the first official television broadcast in St. Louis on June 26, 1947.

He was one of the pioneers of television in St. Louis when KSD-TV was started in 1947. Eschen broadcast news, sports and special events during his career. He is known for his coverage of St. Louis Archbishop John J. Glennon during his installation as Cardinal in February, 1946 in Rome, Italy. While in Europe, he was also called upon to cover the Nuremberg trials and the death of Glennon in Dublin, Ireland.

Eschen was noted as a top newsreader on radio and recognized for his radio voice. He was elected to the St. Louis Radio Hall of Fame on January 3, 2005.
