= WVIT =

Television station in New Britain, Connecticut

- New Britain–Hartford–New Haven, Connecticut; United States
- City: New Britain, Connecticut
- Channels: Digital: 31 (UHF), shared with WRDM-CD; Virtual: 30
- Branding: NBC CT, NBC Connecticut

Programming
- Affiliations: 30.1: NBC; for others, see § Subchannels

Ownership
- Owner: NBC Owned Television Stations; (NBC Telemundo License LLC)
- Sister stations: WRDM-CD / WDMR-LD

History
- Founded: July 11, 1952
- First air date: February 13, 1953
- Former call signs: WKNB-TV (1953–1957); WNBC (1957–1960); WHNB-TV (1960–1978)
- Former channel numbers: Analog: 30 (UHF, 1953–2009); Digital: 35 (UHF, 2004–2019)
- Former affiliations: CBS (secondary, 1953–1955)
- Call sign meaning: Viacom International Television (former owner's official subsidiary for trademark, copyright and station licensing purposes)

Technical information
- Licensing authority: FCC
- Facility ID: 74170
- ERP: 374 kW
- HAAT: 450 m (1,476 ft)
- Transmitter coordinates: 41°42′2″N 72°49′55″W

Links
- Public license information: Public file; LMS
- Website: www.nbcconnecticut.com

WVIT (channel 30) is a television station licensed to New Britain, Connecticut, United States, serving the Hartford–New Haven market. It is owned and operated by the NBC television network through its NBC Owned Television Stations division alongside Class A Telemundo outlet WRDM-CD (channel 19). The two stations share studios on New Britain Avenue in West Hartford and transmitter facilities on Rattlesnake Mountain in Farmington, Connecticut.

== History ==
=== Early years ===
WVIT signed on for the first time on February 13, 1953, as WKNB-TV, owned by the New Britain Broadcasting Company along with WKNB radio (840 AM, now WRYM). The calls stood for Kensington–New Britain. It is Connecticut's second-oldest television station and the first on the UHF band. The station has been with NBC since sign-on, though during its first two and a half years, it secondarily carried CBS programming as one of two affiliates in Connecticut, along with WNHC-TV (now WTNH) in New Haven. At the time, Hartford and New Haven were recognized by the Federal Communications Commission (FCC) as separate television markets; the commission would merge them into one market in 1954.

In January 1955, NBC announced it would purchase the WKNB stations for just over $600,000. Though the network was acquiring both radio and television outlets, the key to the deal was channel 30–as one of the first UHF stations to be owned by a major network, the FCC encouraged the networks to expand their owned-and-operated holdings to include outlets in the new band to help ensure its viability. Indeed, NBC made plans to boost channel 30's signal to cover the entire market.

WKNB-TV began carrying the full NBC programming schedule in October 1955. The FCC approved the sale to NBC in December 1956, nearly two years after it was first announced. The network then renamed channel 30 WNBC (for New Britain, Connecticut) in January 1957. In its first stint as an NBC-owned station, channel 30 failed to gain much headway in the ratings, largely because television manufacturers were not required to include UHF tuning capability until 1964. Viewers had to buy an expensive converter to watch WNBC, and even with one the picture was barely viewable. In addition, plans to relocate the station's tower and to boost transmission power never moved forward.

In September 1957, the Hartford-based Travelers Insurance Company signed on independent station WTIC-TV (channel 3, now WFSB), the state's second and last VHF station. Within a year of its debut (and despite its radio sister having been an NBC Radio Network affiliate for over thirty years) WTIC-TV became Connecticut's CBS affiliate, replacing its owned-and-operated station, WHCT-TV (channel 18, now Univision affiliate WUVN). NBC then realized its UHF experiment was a lost cause (it had shut down its other owned UHF station in Buffalo, New York, in October 1958), and in June 1959 sold WNBC and WKNB radio for $750,000 to Plains Television Inc., a joint venture of Transcontinental Properties and H & E Balaban Corporation (WKNB was spun off immediately afterward). As part of the deal, Springfield Television, the owner of fellow NBC affiliate WWLP in Springfield, Massachusetts, was to have held a one-third share in channel 30; it abandoned this stake before the deal's completion after concerns arose over WWLP and WNBC's overlapping coverage areas, but continued to hold an option to reacquire it for some time afterward pending FCC approval. In May 1960, channel 30's callsign changed again – this time to WHNB-TV (for Hartford-New Britain); NBC reclaimed the WNBC calls for its flagship radio and television combination (the former WRCA-AM-FM-TV) in New York City.

In 1966, WHNB-TV became, once again, one of two NBC affiliates in Connecticut; the network signed with Waterbury-licensed WATR-TV (channel 20) to get its programming into New Haven on a strong signal. By this time, television manufacturers were now required to include all-channel tuning. Channel 30 itself made up for the shortfall in its market coverage by operating two low-power translators (starting in 1971): W79AI (channel 79) in Torrington and W59AA (channel 59) in New Haven. They also operated W79AH in Waterbury in the 1960s.

=== Viacom and NBC ownership ===
WVIT's NBC30 logo used from 2005 until July 16, 2009. The numeric "30" had been in use in one form or another since 1992.

In the summer of 1977, Plains Television announced it would sell WHNB-TV to the original iteration of Viacom for $15 million. The former CBS Inc. subsidiary was making its first foray into broadcast station ownership. Shortly after assuming control in the spring of 1978, channel 30's call letters were changed to the present WVIT on June 12 (for "Viacom International Television") to reflect its new ownership. Viacom immediately announced plans to boost WVIT's signal, and also made upgrades in the station's news department. In 1980, channel 30 signed on with a new transmitter that more than doubled its coverage area, giving it a clear signal to much of New Haven for the first time, though the channel 59 repeater was kept in service. WVIT became the sole Connecticut-based NBC affiliate in March 1982, when WATR-TV's affiliation contract with NBC ended and the station became independent WTXX (it is now WCCT-TV). The Torrington translator was turned off in 1987, and the New Haven repeater was shut down in the mid-1990s to allow full-powered WTVU (now WCTX) to begin operations. In 1993, WVIT and WTXX entered into a part-time local marketing agreement (LMA) after talks with Fox affiliate WTIC-TV (channel 61) failed.

Viacom purchased Paramount Pictures in 1994, placing its five-station group (WVIT; KMOV in St. Louis; WHEC-TV in Rochester, New York; WNYT in Albany, New York; and KSLA-TV in Shreveport, Louisiana) under common ownership with the Paramount Stations Group; the two groups were formally consolidated in December 1995. The merged company decided to divest itself of all of its major network affiliates to focus on stations that carried its then-upstart United Paramount Network (UPN). WVIT, the first television outlet Viacom purchased was the last station to be sold, as Viacom agreed to trade channel 30 to former owner NBC in return for future purchase rights to WWHO in Chillicothe, Ohio, and WLWC in New Bedford, Massachusetts, two stations NBC was operating by way of local marketing agreements. The sale closed on December 8, 1997, making WVIT an NBC O&O for the second time in its history. It also ended its part-time LMA with WTXX, and the LMA deal was transferred to WTIC-TV.

On December 4, 2017, NBCUniversal announced that it would buy Telemundo affiliate WRDM-CD and its Springfield satellite station WDMR-LP from ZGS Communications, as with several other NBC O&Os, WRDM would become a sister station to WVIT, creating the third duopoly in the Hartford–New Haven television market, following the duopolies of Nexstar Media Group's WTNH/WCTX and Tegna's WTIC-TV/WCCT-TV (WRDM is exempt from FCC ownership caps, including the duopoly rule). ZGS had sold WRDM's spectrum in the FCC's incentive auction for $10,574,516 and indicated that the station would enter into a post-auction channel sharing agreement, which occurred with WVIT at the start of the year. The sale was officially completed on February 1, 2018.

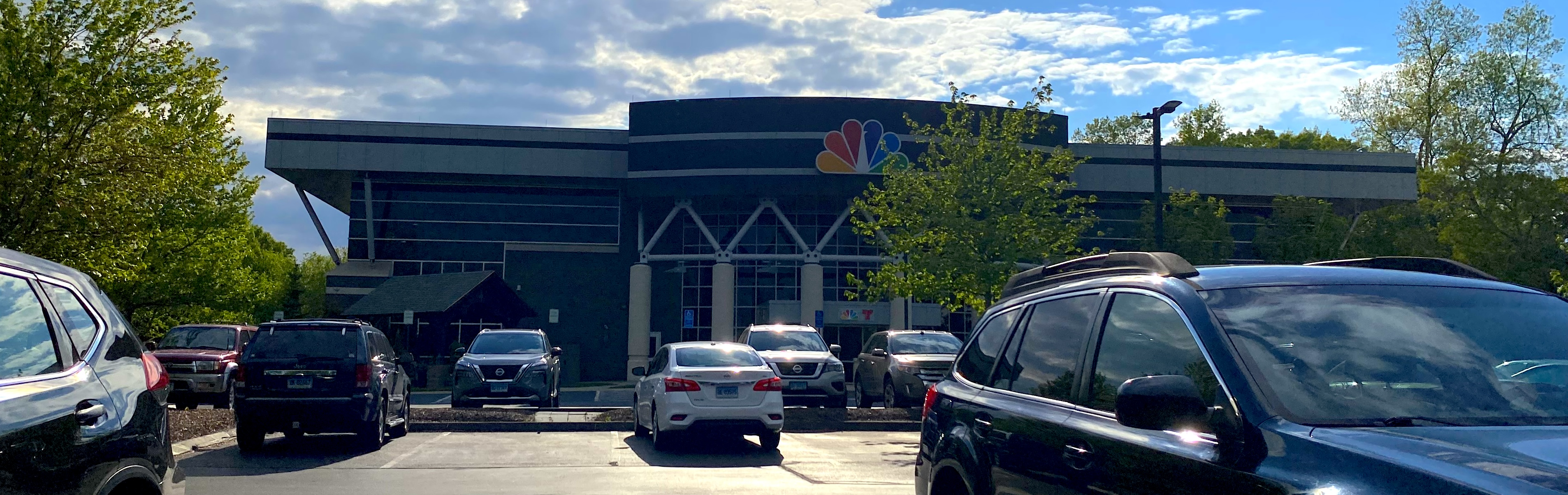
The "NBC Connecticut and Telemundo Connecticut" broadcast center in West Hartford, which opened in 2009; the station had been based at the same site since its sign-on, and the former building was directly east of the current facility.

== Programming ==
On June 16, 2017, WVIT announced that it would not air that week's edition of Sunday Night with Megyn Kelly, which featured an interview with radio host Alex Jones. The station cited viewer, advertiser and management sensitivities to the views of Jones, as he had previously expressed a denial of the Sandy Hook Elementary School shootings. Otherwise, the station clears the entire NBC lineup.

=== News operation ===
On June 13, 2016, WVIT became the second station in Connecticut to debut a 4 p.m. newscast. On the same day, WVIT began using Artworks' new "Look N" standardized graphics that were first adopted by sister station WNBC, while its music changed to 615 Music's "The Tower", which was first adopted in 2000 by sister stations WMAQ-TV and KNBC.

On June 7, 2021, WVIT debuted its 7 p.m. newscast, becoming the first and only station in Connecticut to have a prime time newscast.

Additionally, WVIT hosts a live 7:30 p.m. newscast on its FAST channel, NBC Connecticut News 24/7.

=== Notable former on-air staff ===
- Chris Berman
- Van Hackett – evening anchor, 1990–1993
- Brian Kilmeade
- Rob Marciano
- Natalie Morales
- Rob Morrison
- Beasley Reece
- Steve Savard – weekend sports anchor, 1993–1994
- Brian Shactman
- Chris Wragge – weekend sports anchor, 1994–1996

== Technical information ==
=== Subchannels ===
Subchannels of WVIT and WRDM-CD
License	Subchannel	Res.	Short name	Programming
WVIT	30.1	1080i	WVIT-HD	NBC
WVIT	30.2	480i	COZI-TV	Cozi TV
WVIT	30.3	480i	CRIMES	NBC True CRMZ
WVIT	30.4	480i	OXYGEN	Oxygen
WRDM-CD	19.1	1080i	TLMD	Telemundo
WRDM-CD	19.2	480i	EXITOS	TeleXitos

Digital subchannel 30.2 carried NBC Weather Plus; national network operations for that service ended in December 2008. NBC Plus then aired on that subchannel. This channel used the same graphics as Weather Plus, with a new 'NBC Plus' logo, and without the on-camera meteorologist segments. On December 20, 2012, WVIT replaced NBC Plus with Cozi TV; WVIT was the last NBC-owned station to carry NBC Plus. Digital subchannel 30.3 carried Universal Sports until its transition into a cable- and satellite-exclusive service on January 1, 2012, and eventually Universal Sports shut down altogether on November 16, 2015. The 30.3 subchannel was reactivated in 2015, when WVIT added the Spanish-language digital network TeleXitos, normally only carried on Telemundo stations; TeleXitos moved to a subchannel of WRDM-CD after its acquisition by NBCUniversal in February 2018. WVIT again reactivated the 30.3 subchannel in 2020, coinciding with the launch of LX.

=== Analog-to-digital conversion ===
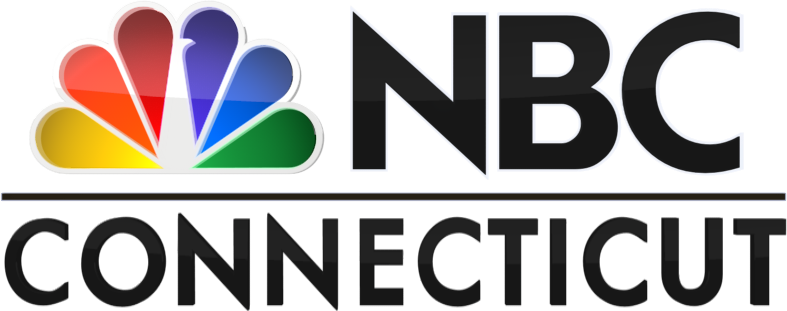
WVIT's NBC Connecticut first logo, used from July 2009 until July 2017

WVIT shut down its analog signal, over UHF channel 30, on June 12, 2009, as part of the federally mandated transition from analog to digital television. The station's digital signal remained on its pre-transition UHF channel 35, using virtual channel 30. With the transition, the height of the station's transmitter tower was increased to 1,100 feet (335 m) inclusive of the antenna.

=== Spectrum auction repack ===
On August 2, 2019, WVIT was moved from channel 35 to channel 31.
