= Van Hackett =

American journalist (born 1943)

- Born: Perry Van Vliet Hackett; April 22, 1943 (age 82); Scarsdale, New York, US
- Occupation: Television journalist
- Spouse: Clara Ann

Perry Van Vliet Hackett (born April 22, 1943) is an American television journalist who worked as a news anchor at TV stations across the United States.

== Early life ==
Perry Van Vliet Hackett was born April 22, 1943, in Scarsdale, New York. He graduated from Parsons College in Iowa in 1965.

== Career ==
Though Hackett had earned a biology degree at Parsons, he decided to enter television news to make money, first working at KQTV in St. Joseph, Missouri. He then served in the U.S. Marine Corps in Vietnam and left in 1970 with the rank of first lieutenant.

Hackett was hired by WPTV in West Palm Beach, Florida in 1973. He served as the assistant news director and 5:30 and 11 p.m. news anchor until being dismissed in 1976. At the time, the station was adopting electronic news gathering, and its management felt another anchor would be a better fit for the forthcoming format. Hackett cycled through jobs over the next several years, working short stints at KTVV in Austin, Texas (1976–1977); WBIR-TV in Knoxville, Tennessee (1977–1978); and KTVX in Salt Lake City.

By 1980, Hackett joined the news staff of KTRK-TV in Houston. He anchored the station's Live at Five newscast before moving to weekends in 1983. In 1984, Hackett and Melanie Lawson were named the station's full-time weekend anchor team while continuing to do reporting. He was moved to anchor the 7 a.m. news in 1986.

Hackett departed KTRK-TV in 1987 after being offered a job by WWOR-TV, a New York City–market station in Secaucus, New Jersey. Hackett initially slotted into the noon and 8 p.m. newscasts, replacing Tom Dunn, but the news department was in the middle of an overhaul under new owners MCA Inc. On October 12, the station debuted an hour-long 10 p.m. newscast anchored by Hackett and Jennifer Valoppi, replacing the 8 p.m. newscast.

Less than a year after Hackett was hired, veteran New York City anchorman Rolland Smith became available after CBS canceled The Morning Program, a short-lived national morning show. WWOR-TV news director Tom Petner hired Smith, who was more known to New York–area viewers than Hackett; calling him "the crown jewel", he was placed on the 10 p.m. news with Valoppi, with Hackett moved to the noon news. That program was canceled as part of a major reorganization of the station's daytime programming, and Hackett departed upon the expiration of his contract in August 1989, refusing an offer to stay on in another role.

At the end of 1989, Hackett was hired by WVIT in Hartford, Connecticut to anchor the station's 6 and 11 p.m. newscasts. Hackett brought a profile of experience to the position, as previously, WVIT evening anchor Joanne Nesti had been paired with newcomers to broadcasting—Anthony Everett and Toby Moffett. However, industry observers doubted that Hackett would provide a ratings boost to WVIT's third-rated local news. In 1993, he was forced out by a broader news anchor reshuffling at Connecticut's TV stations. WVIT hired Gerry Brooks, a popular anchor at market-leading WFSB, to present the 6 and 11 p.m. news alongside Nesti, and Hackett acknowledged the move would lead to his departure. Hackett doubted he'd work in television news again, telling Jon Lender of the Hartford Courant that he was not "impressed with the direction the medium was heading in" and lamenting its "trivialization".

Though he worked in radio news in New York, Hackett remained out of the television industry until December 2003, when he became the main anchor and news director at WHSV-TV in Harrisonburg, Virginia. He retired from the position on August 18, 2006.

== Personal life ==
Off and on over the years, as early as 1984, Hackett worked on a novel fictionalizing his experiences in Vietnam. He was still marketing the manuscript, as well as a second book, as of 2006.
