= KSDK =

Television station in St. Louis

- St. Louis, Missouri; United States
- Channels: Digital: 35 (UHF); Virtual: 5
- Branding: 5 On Your Side

Programming
- Affiliations: 5.1: NBC; for others, see § Subchannels

Ownership
- Owner: Tegna Inc., a subsidiary of Nexstar Media Group; (Multimedia KSDK, LLC)
- Sister stations: Nexstar: KTVI, KPLR-TV

History
- First air date: February 8, 1947
- Former call signs: KSD-TV (1947–1979)
- Former channel numbers: Analog: 5 (VHF, 1947–2009)
- Former affiliations: All secondary: DuMont (1947–1956); CBS (1947–1953); ABC (1948–1953); United (1967)
- Call sign meaning: Disambiguation of original KSD-TV calls

Technical information
- Licensing authority: FCC
- Facility ID: 46981
- ERP: 838 kW
- HAAT: 339 m (1,112 ft)
- Transmitter coordinates: 38°34′5″N 90°19′55″W

Links
- Public license information: Public file; LMS
- Website: www.ksdk.com

KSDK (channel 5) is a television station in St. Louis, Missouri, United States, affiliated with NBC. It is owned by the Tegna subsidiary of Nexstar Media Group; Nexstar also owns Fox affiliate KTVI (channel 2) and CW station KPLR-TV (channel 11). KSDK's studios are located on Highlands Plaza Drive in the Cheltenham neighborhood of St. Louis, with transmitter facilities in Shrewsbury, Missouri.

== History ==
Article in the St. Louis Post-Dispatch edition dated February 8, 1947, announcing KSD-TV's first programs

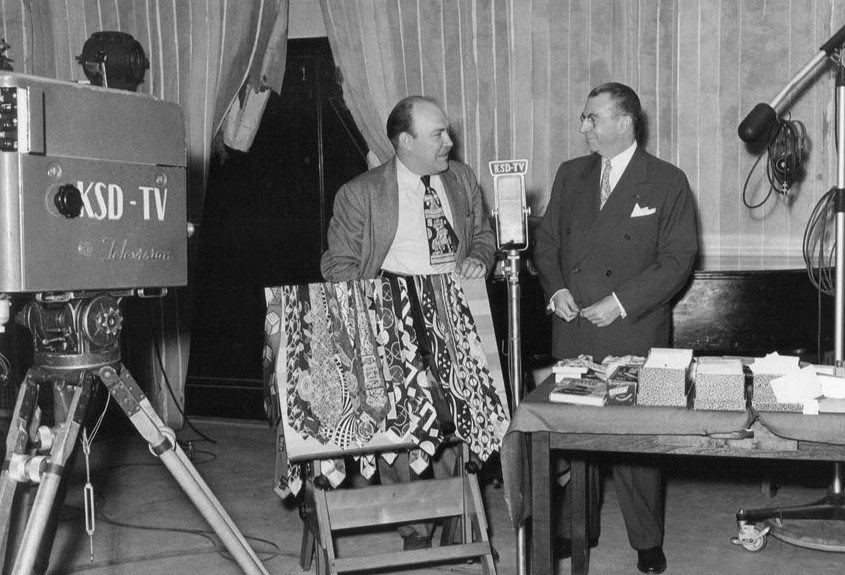
A 1948 KSD broadcast

The station first signed on the air as KSD-TV on February 8, 1947. It was owned by the Pulitzer Publishing Company, publishers of the St. Louis Post-Dispatch and owners of KSD radio (550 AM, now KTRS). It was the ninth television station to sign on in the United States and the first television station in Missouri. The station's original studios were located adjacent to the Post-Dispatch building on Olive Street. It was the second commercial station located west of the Mississippi River, following KTLA in Los Angeles, which had signed on just 17 days earlier. In the early days, KSD produced much of its own programming and developed its own talent pool. Many St. Louis television pioneers from KSD-TV came from radio, including Frank Eschen, Kay Morton, Russ Severin and Dave Russell.

Because of a freeze on new television station licenses imposed by the Federal Communications Commission (FCC), KSD-TV was the only television station in the St. Louis market, until WTVI (channel 54, now KTVI channel 2, a Fox affiliate) signed on in August 1953. Often known as simply "Channel 5", the station has always been an NBC affiliate, owing to KSD radio's longtime affiliation with the NBC Red Network. The station is currently the longest-tenured affiliate in the market of any major broadcast television network. In its early years, Channel 5 also carried secondary affiliations with CBS, DuMont and ABC. In the early 1960s, Channel 5 became the first St. Louis television station to broadcast in color.

After Pulitzer sold KSD radio to Combined Communications Corporation in 1979 (prior to Combined's merger into the Gannett Company that same year), KSD-TV, in order to comply with an FCC regulation in place then that stated that TV and radio stations in the same market, but different ownership had to use different call signs, modified theirs to the current KSDK on September 10, 1979. In 1982, the station relocated its studios from its original location on Olive Street to Market Street in Downtown St. Louis. In 1983, Pulitzer traded channel 5 to Multimedia, Inc. in return for WFBC (now WYFF) in Greenville, South Carolina, and WXII-TV in Winston-Salem, North Carolina, in what was a rare instance of one company's flagship station being traded for another. Pulitzer earned a handsome return on its original investment in KSD radio in 1922. During the 1980s and 1990s, KSDK was the highest-rated NBC affiliate in the country.

In 1990, KSDK dropped the longtime Eyewitness News branding and rebranded its newscasts as NewsChannel 5; the station also began to operate on a 24-hour-a-day schedule. On July 24, 1995, Multimedia was purchased by the Gannett Company, with the acquisition finalized on December 4. In 1998, KSDK debuted the "Window on St. Louis", a street-side studio located in the same downtown St. Louis building that also houses KSDK's other studios. The local program Show Me St. Louis used this studio for broadcasts for nearly 20 years. The Window on St. Louis was modeled on Today's "Window on the World".

KSDK's former logo, used from 1993 to 2017, with an outline of the Gateway Arch behind the "5". The Helvetica "5" dated from 1982; until 1993 it was usually paired with the NBC logo (the 11-feather "Proud N" until 1986, and the current six-feather design thereafter).

In an attempt to provide St. Louisans with local and national election results during the 2004 elections, KSDK partnered with PBS member station KETC (channel 9) to simulcast election coverage. The KSDK/KETC partnership continued through September 2005, when, along with radio partners KYKY (98.1 FM) and KEZK (102.5 FM), a telethon for Hurricane Katrina relief was simulcast.

KSDK produced the first broadcast of any local program in St. Louis in high definition, when it broadcast the St. Louis Thanksgiving Day Parade on November 24, 2005. Incidentally, the 2005 parade also marked the final year that the event, which had been a Thanksgiving Day tradition on KSDK, would be broadcast on the station, as the parade moved to CBS affiliate KMOV (channel 4) in 2006.

On June 29, 2015, the Gannett Company split in two, with one side specializing in print media and the other side specializing in broadcast and digital media. KSDK was retained by the latter company, named Tegna.

In 2017, the station re-branded as "5 On Your Side".

In January 2026, the station moved its studios to a building in the Highlands development on the site of the old St. Louis Arena in the city's Cheltenham section. KSDK was the last St. Louis-area television station to have its studios in downtown and is the only station with studios in the city itself; KMOV had previously moved from its One Memorial Drive studios to Maryland Heights in 2023, KDNL-TV (who had long abandoned local news) moved production from Cole Street to the University Club Tower in Richmond Heights the year prior, and KPLR left their Chase Park Plaza Hotel studios for a new purpose-built facility in Maryland Heights in 2003, joined five years later by KTVI. Incidentally KSDK's new location is not far from the site of KTVI's old studios at the corner of Oakland and Hampton Avenues (now a Mercedes-Benz dealership).

Nexstar Media Group, owner of KTVI and KPLR-TV (channel 11) in St. Louis, acquired Tegna in a deal announced in August 2025 and completed on March 19, 2026. Nexstar was permitted by the FCC to hold three TV station licenses in markets such as St. Louis. A temporary restraining order issued one week later by the U.S. District Court for the Eastern District of California, later escalated to a preliminary injunction, has prevented Nexstar from integrating the stations.

== Local programming ==
=== News operation ===
Former "5 On Your Side" news open

KSDK presently broadcasts 37 hours of locally produced newscasts each week (with six hours each weekday and 3 1/2 hours each on Saturdays and Sundays). The station also produces five half-hour episodes of Show Me St. Louis each week.

KSDK dominated the news ratings in St. Louis for the better part of its first six decades on the air. KMOX-TV (now KMOV) took the lead in the late 1960s, but KSDK regained the #1 spot in the early 1980s and kept it for most of the next two decades, with some of the highest (and by some measures, the highest) rated newscasts in the nation. For much of that time, its main anchors stayed at the station for 10 years or more. At one point, its 6 p.m. newscast ended with local elementary schoolchildren flashing the hand signs for "5" and "1", signifying that, as a promo featuring the kids said, "Even a second grader could tell you that Channel 5 is number 1."

During the spring 2004 sweeps, it lost its first-place position at 10 p.m. to KMOV, and the two stations have traded the ratings crown in that timeslot several times since then. KMOV has also closed its ratings gap in several other timeslots, due in part to NBC's overall weaker ratings since 2004. KSDK's ratings dominance began to slip dramatically in 2009, first losing late news to KMOV, and then morning news to KTVI. In 2013, its ratings went into free fall. The November 2013 ratings book saw KSDK tumble into last place for the first time in its history. KTVI easily won the morning news and KMOV swept the rest.

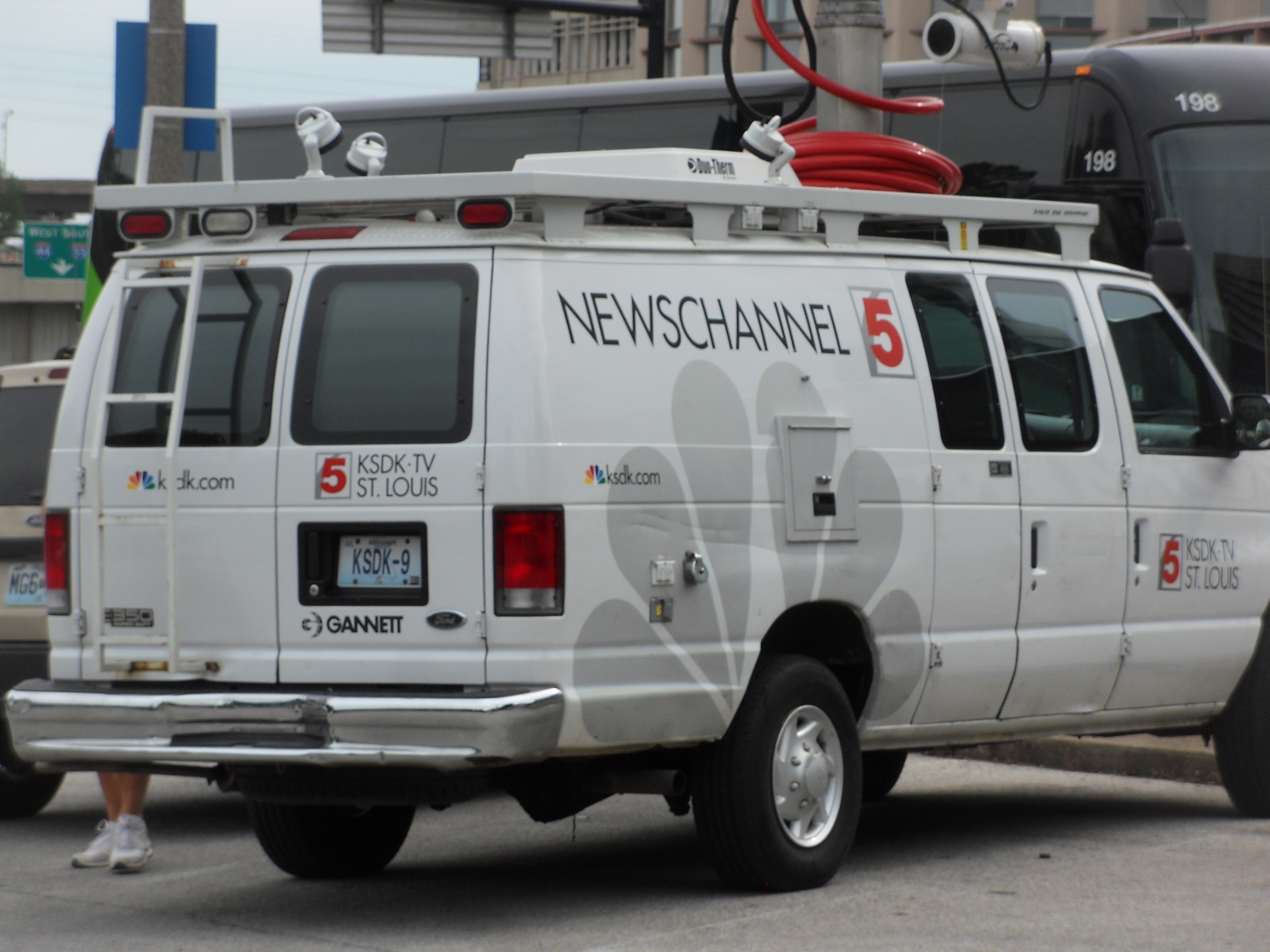
KSDK-TV news van

A sports wrap-up program previously aired on Sunday evenings after the 10 p.m. newscast called Sports Plus. It was originally hosted by Mike Bush until he moved from sports director to news anchor in 2004, and then hosted by sports director Rene Knott, who became the news co-anchor of Today in St. Louis, KSDK's weekday morning newscast, in 2017.

From August 1989 until September 2011, Today in St. Louis co-anchors Jennifer Blome and Art Holliday had one of the longest anchor pairings in U.S. local television history. In 2011, Holliday was reassigned to co-anchor a new half-hour 4 p.m. newscast alongside Kay Quinn that debuted on September 12, 2011, while Blome was paired with Pat McGonigle (formerly of WHEC-TV in Rochester) on the morning newscast.

On September 12, 2005, KSDK debuted a half-hour weekday newscast at 10 a.m., following the third hour of NBC's Today; the newscast was discontinued in September 2009, but returned on September 12, 2011, as an hour-long program (as a result, the fourth hour of Today airs on a one-hour delay at 11 a.m.). On February 6, 2006, KSDK became the first television station in St. Louis, and the seventh station in the United States, to broadcast all newscasts and locally produced programming in high definition; it also became the first St. Louis area station to stream all of its newscasts online. On August 13, 2007, KSDK debuted Online @ 9, a 10-minute news webcast on the station's website that was tailored to an online audience. That online newscast has been discontinued.

On November 11, 2010, KSDK entered into a news share agreement with Sinclair Broadcast Group–owned ABC affiliate KDNL-TV, to produce two pre-recorded half-hour newscasts at 5 p.m. and 10 p.m. weeknights for that station starting on January 3, 2011 (prior to the agreement, KDNL had not run any local newscasts since it shut down its news department in October 2001); in addition, KDNL also aired weekend rebroadcasts of KSDK's entertainment/features program Show Me St. Louis. KDNL general manager Tom Tipton stated that the station did not want to run simulcast or repurposed newscasts in its efforts to return daily newscasts to channel 30. The arrangement was unusual given that KSDK and KDNL are both "Big Three" network affiliates, and the fact that the newscasts on both stations competed against one another. The agreement with KDNL was to have ended on December 31, 2013; however, it was extended for another month until January 31, 2014.

On September 12, 2011, along with the relaunch of its 10 a.m. newscast and the addition of a 4 p.m. newscast, Today in St. Louis expanded from 2 1/2 to three hours on weekday mornings, now running from 4 to 7 a.m.; while the noon newscast was reduced to a half-hour with Show Me St. Louis being moved to fill the remaining half-hour. With these additions, KSDK was reduced to only three hours of syndicated daytime shows to back up its newscasts outside of NBC network programming.

By 2014, KSDK had canceled its 10 a.m. newscast, with a now hour-long Show Me St. Louis taking up the 10 a.m. hour, with the noon newscast also expanding back to 60 minutes in length. By 2017, Show Me St. Louis was again only 30 minutes, with infomercials filling the 10:30 half hour. The noon news was typically 30 minutes long with occasional extensions to 60 minutes, with another infomercial filling the 12:30 slot. In 2017, KSDK's noon news was discontinued, and replaced with a second run of Jeopardy! In 2018, Today in St. Louis was reduced to two hours on weekday mornings, running from 5 to 7 a.m. In 2020, KSDK expanded Today in St. Louis back to 2 1/2 hours, running from 4:30 to 7 a.m. In addition, KSDK revived its 10 a.m. newscast for a third time and has moved Show Me St. Louis to 10:30 a.m.

In October 2021, KSDK revived its noon newscast and moved their first of 2 Jeopardy! slots to 12:30 where it remained until The Ellen DeGeneres Show ended in May 2022. After which, Inside Edition moved to 3 p.m. on KSDK from 4:30 on KMOV and Jeopardy! reruns moved to 3:30 while new episodes continue to air at 4:30.

KSDK used to operate a Bell 206B3 JetRanger helicopter called "Chopper 5", that was used for breaking news and severe weather coverage. To save money, the station began paying market leader KMOV to use video from its chopper in 2010. Its news reporting has also won the station a multitude of journalism awards including Regional Emmys, Gabriel Awards and Regional Edward R. Murrow Awards.

==== 2014 school security controversy ====
In January 2014, KSDK faced criticism from educators and the community for an undercover piece on school security. On January 16, a KSDK videojournalist entered Kirkwood High School in Kirkwood to test the school's security, wearing a hidden camera. This followed several other tests at local single-building elementary schools, whereas Kirkwood High School is a multi-building campus. Thus, Kirkwood was the only school where the employee entered without being questioned. School personnel became concerned when the KSDK employee asked to use a restroom and left the office in the opposite direction, and when the station would not confirm with the school that the employee's visit was only a test, the school was placed on lockdown for 40 minutes, when a station representative finally confirmed that the employee's presence was for a story. Investigative reporter Leisa Zigman apologized on-air for the chain of events leading to the lockdown, but the station stood by its story, claiming the lockdown did not occur until an hour after the videojournalist left. Despite a school spokesperson admitting changes to security needed to be made, KSDK was strongly criticized by viewers raising questions about journalistic ethics, and anchor Mike Bush led the 10 p.m. newscast on January 20 with a more formal apology, stating that the station was reviewing its procedures to ensure a similar incident would not occur again.

==== Notable current on-air staff ====
- Steve Savard – anchor

==== Notable former on-air staff ====
- Fran Charles – reporter (1991–1992)
- Denise D'Ascenzo – reporter and talk show host (1980s)
- Karen Foss – anchor (1979–2006)
- Paul Goodloe – chief meteorologist (1997–1999)
- Janice Huff – meteorologist (1987–1991)
- Julius Hunter – reporter (1966–1974)
- Stan Kann – personality (became frequent guest to The Tonight Show and other programs with his presentations of gadgets)
- George Noory – news director (early to mid-1980s)
- Cindy Preszler (AMS and NWA Seals of Approval) – chief meteorologist (October 1998–April 22, 2016)
- Jay Randolph – sports director/reporter
- Sonny Randle – sports reporter (1965–1970)
- Bob Richards – chief meteorologist (1983–1994)
- Anne Thompson – consumer reporter (1983–1986)
- Debbye Turner – Show Me St. Louis anchor/feature reporter (1995–2001)
- Dianne White (Clatto) – weathercaster, reporter, and sports journalist who was the first African-American weathercaster in the United States
- Matt Winer – sports reporter
- Trey Wingo – sports reporter (1991–1997)

=== Sports programming ===
KSDK's 5 On Your Side sports logo, used since 2017

When KSD-TV signed on in 1947, it began a longtime association with the St. Louis Cardinals as the team's flagship station. On May 8, 1966, during ceremonies for the opening of Busch Memorial Stadium, Bill Houska Sr. flew home plate from Sportsman's Park to the new downtown stadium in "Chopper 5". The station aired Cardinals games from 1947 to 1958, before losing the rights to KPLR-TV for the next four seasons. The Cardinals returned in 1963 and remained on channel 5 until 1987 – long after many other "Big Three" network affiliates dropped local sports event coverage. KSDK lost the rights to KPLR again after the 1987 season; the station also aired any Cardinals games as part of NBC's broadcast contract with Major League Baseball from 1947 to 1989, including the team's World Series victories in 1964, 1967 and 1982.

On December 7, 2006, KSDK re-obtained the television rights to Cardinals games effective with the 2007 season, ending a 19-year run on KPLR. KSDK aired an average of 20 locally produced Cardinals games each year, with most other games airing on Fox Sports Midwest outside the St. Louis market. KSDK lost the broadcast rights on July 15, 2010, when Fox Sports Midwest signed an exclusive contract with the team beginning with the 2011 season, ending the Cardinals' over-the-air telecasts. The final Cardinals telecast on channel 5 aired on October 3, 2010, with a game against the Colorado Rockies.

KSD-TV/KSDK has also been involved in airing games of St. Louis' two former NFL teams, the Cardinals and Rams; the station broadcast the Cardinals' home interconference contests from 1970 to 1987, when the Cardinals relocated to Phoenix, and again with the Rams from their arrival in St. Louis in 1995 until 1997, when CBS acquired the AFC package from NBC. It has aired all Sunday Night Football games through NBC since 2006; all Sunday night games that the Rams took part in from then until their return to Los Angeles after the 2015 season were aired on Channel 5.

From 2006 to 2021, KSDK broadcast St. Louis Blues games that aired via the NHL on NBC; this included the team's victory in the 2019 Stanley Cup Final.

=== Other locally produced programming ===
KSDK has had a long history of producing local programs, including the Wranglers Club with Texas Bruce (1950–1963), Corky's Colorama with Clif St. James playing Corky the Clown (1963–1980), Newsbeat hosted by Dick Ford and John Auble (1976–1984), and Midday A.M. (c. 1979–1986).

Since September 5, 1995, KSDK has aired Show Me St. Louis, which highlights local entertainment and other (mostly family-oriented) attractions around the St. Louis area. The program usually broadcasts from the "Window on St. Louis", where local groups and organizations are allowed to bring signs to advertise their events, though it occasionally leaves the studio to broadcast from local attractions (such as the St. Louis Zoo, Busch Stadium, the Fox Theatre) or from surrounding communities (such as Waterloo, Illinois and Florissant) that have uncommon or unknown attractions that may be of interest to viewers; these "Great Escapes" (as the segment within the show is titled) usually occur during summer months. The program is sponsored and has advertorial segments which are disclaimed to be from the advertisers which sponsor them, which are then disclaimed at the end of each episode. Another short advertorial feature, Simply Irresistible is carried in some prime time ad breaks.

During the 1980s, the syndicated daytime talk show Sally (hosted by Sally Jessy Raphael) originated from KSDK's studios (Multimedia Entertainment, a subsidiary of former KSDK owner Multimedia, Inc., distributed the program nationally until the company's 1995 merger with Gannett, with the distribution rights held by Universal Television Enterprises and then Studios USA Television until the show's 2002 cancellation).

== Community activity ==
KSDK is active in several community-based and charitable projects. Here are some of the most well-known:

- A Place to Call Home is an Emmy Award-winning weekly segment which profiles one child placed within the foster care system who is in need of adoption. KSDK has partnered with the Foster and Adoptive Care Coalition for the segment, which debuted in 2002. In September 2018, The Foster and Adoptive Care Coalition announced KSDK's A Place to Call Home segment had found 400 children forever homes. A secondary program, Little Wishes, allows viewers who are unable to adopt a foster child to add a little happiness to their life by purchasing a gift for him or her during the holiday season.
- Friend to Friend was a program that reminded viewers on the fifth of each month to perform a breast self-exam to detect breast cancer in its early, treatable stages. Viewers could also contact KSDK for an informational packet that included reminders on performing a self-exam. The station remains a sponsor for the Komen St. Louis More Than Pink Walk, which raises money for breast cancer research for Susan G. Komen for the Cure. In 2006, the St. Louis fundraiser overtook Denver as the largest Race for the Cure event in the country with more than 64,000 participants, with more than $2.5 million raised with over 65,000 participants in 2007.
- Volunteer 5 was a weekly, week-long program that collected donations for a particular local charity or community organization. It operated as a telethon, with phone operators taking calls between 4 and 7 p.m. each weeknight from anyone wishing to donate time or a monetary payment. Volunteer 5 provided more than $5 million annually in services and hundreds of thousands of volunteer hours to local non-profit organizations. The program began in 1993 to help those affected by the Great Flood of 1993, and ended in November 2005.
- The Jerry Lewis MDA Telethon aired each Labor Day weekend on KSDK until 2012 (having aired only in prime time on the Sunday before the holiday in 2011 and 2012), benefiting the Muscular Dystrophy Association (MDA) to fund research to find a cure for muscular dystrophy and other diseases affecting the nervous and muscular systems. Anchor Mike Bush served as host of the telethon's local segments, whose donations benefit the St. Louis chapter of the MDA. KSDK lost its status as St. Louis' "Love Network" station when the telethon abandoned its syndication model, changed its name to the MDA Show of Strength and became a two-hour network telecast on ABC (airing locally on KDNL-TV, channel 30) in 2013 and 2014; the event was discontinued in 2015. The station re-launched the MDA Show of Strength in 2017, raising money for MDA St. Louis. That year the telethon was hosted by Mike Bush and Heidi Glaus, and streamed on the station's website and on Facebook Live for three hours. In 2018, Mike and Heidi hosted the telethon for a longer period of time, streaming it online and on KSDK. In 2019, Anne Allred joined the telethon as Mike's co-host. That year the pair raised more than $135,000 for the St. Louis chapter of the MDA. All money raised during the annual MDA Show of Strength stays in St. Louis.

== Technical information ==
=== Subchannels ===
The station's signal is multiplexed:

Subchannels of KSDK
Subchannel	Res.	Short name	Programming
5.1	1080i	KSDK-5	NBC
5.2	480i	GreatTV	Great
5.3	480i	Crime	True Crime Network
5.4	480i	Quest	Quest
5.5	480i	NOSEY	Nosey
5.6	480i	OXYGEN	Oxygen
11.3	480i	Comet	Comet (KPLR-TV)

Broadcast on behalf of another station

Subchannel 5.2 debuted in June 2005 as an affiliate of NBC Weather Plus (under the name "NewsChannel 5 Weather PLUS"), before affiliating with The Local AccuWeather Channel in December 2008, after NBC Weather Plus discontinued operations. On August 28, 2013, 5.2 started carrying Bounce TV. A few years later, it stopped carrying Bounce and started carrying Get.

On January 20, 2015, KSDK launched subchannel 5.3, carrying True Crime Network, which launched the same day.

On January 17, 2018, KSDK launched digital subchannel 5.4, which carried clips promoting Quest, a new multicast network that made its debut on January 29, 2018.

Subchannel 5.5 launched in 2021 to carry Twist. When Twist shut down on December 31, 2023, the subchannel switched to duplicating the 5.3 program feed (True Crime Network), until Nosey launched sometime in 2024.

Subchannel 5.6 carried This TV, until the network shut down in 2024. After that, the subchannel remained blank for a few months, until the launch of Confess later that year. Since February 2026, it has been the home of the station's 24-hour local streaming weather channel, 5 On Your Side Weather Impact 24/7. This is the first time that KSDK has carried a local weather channel over-the-air since the discontinuation of NewsChannel 5 Weather Plus back in 2013, and provides a second over-the-air local weather channel in the market after KMOV's First Alert Weather NOW.

=== Analog-to-digital conversion ===
KSDK ended regular programming on its analog signal, over VHF channel 5, on June 12, 2009, the official date on which full-power television stations in the United States transitioned from analog to digital broadcasts under federal mandate. The station's digital signal continued to broadcasts on its pre-transition UHF channel 35, using virtual channel 5.

As part of the SAFER Act, KSDK kept its analog signal on the air until July 12 to inform viewers of the digital television transition through a loop of public service announcements from the National Association of Broadcasters.
