= Buddy Moreno =

American musician and television personality

- Born: Carlos Jesus Moreno; July 14, 1912; Los Angeles, California, U.S.
- Died: November 29, 2015 (aged 103); Florissant, Missouri, U.S.
- Occupations: Singer, bandleader, radio and television personality
- Years active: 1929–69; 1996–?

Carlos Jesus "Buddy" Moreno (July 14, 1912 – November 29, 2015) was an American musician during the swing era and radio and television personality.

In his book, The Big Bands, jazz writer George T. Simon described Moreno as "a grinning, seemingly ever-joyous guitarist ... who on novelty and uptempoed [sic] tunes projected a pleasant personality and voice to match."

== Biography ==
=== Early life ===
Moreno was born in Los Angeles, California, as the only child to a Spanish father and an Irish mother. He was reported to be a cousin of actress Rita Moreno. He attended the University of California before leaving to join the orchestra of Anson Weeks.

=== Career ===
Moreno's career began in 1929 when he sang in a vocal group. His big breakthrough came in 1933 when he joined Griff Williams's band in San Francisco as a singer and guitar player. Later he became a part of popular bandleader Dick Jurgens' orchestra. Moreno and Jurgens recorded many songs through the label Okeh Records, charting the number one hit "One Dozen Roses" in 1942. Moreno changed band once more, in 1943, when he joined Harry James' band.

Moreno appeared in the films Two Girls and a Sailor (1944) and Bathing Beauty (1944) along with the rest of the band. He formed his own band in 1947 with his wife, singer Perri Mitchell and others. Beginning June 30, 1958, he had a local television program, The Buddy Moreno Show, on KMOX-TV in St. Louis, Missouri.

Moreno relocated to St. Louis in the 1950s, when his band was selected to be the house band in The Chase Park Plaza Hotel's Chase Club, which led to a national radio program, Saturdays at the Chase. As he approached his 60s, he switched to radio and worked for the local stations WIL-FM, WEW and WSIE. In the 1960s, he traveled with Bob Hope to entertain American military personnel around the world.

=== Personal life and death ===
In 1950, Moreno wed Perri Mitchell, whom he had hired as a singer for his band in 1947. They were married until her death in 1998.

Moreno died at a Florissant, Missouri, assisted-living facility on November 29, 2015, at the age of 103. He was buried at Jefferson Barracks National Cemetery.
