= KMOV =

Television station in St. Louis

- St. Louis, Missouri; United States
- Channels: Digital: 24 (UHF); Virtual: 4, 32
- Branding: First Alert 4 (4.1); First Alert 4 on ABC (32.1)

Programming
- Affiliations: 4.1: CBS; 32.1: ABC; for others, see § Technical information

Ownership
- Owner: Gray Media; (Gray Television Licensee, LLC)
- Sister stations: KDTL-LD

History
- Founded: April 1954
- First air date: July 8, 1954
- Former call signs: KWK-TV (1954–1958); KMOX-TV (1958–1986)
- Former channel numbers: Analog: 4 (VHF, 1954–2009); Digital: 56 (UHF, 1999–2009)
- Former affiliations: ABC (secondary, 1954–1957)
- Call sign meaning: From "move", as in "on the move"

Technical information
- Licensing authority: FCC
- Facility ID: 70034
- ERP: 1,000 kW
- HAAT: 341 m (1,119 ft)
- Transmitter coordinates: 38°31′47″N 90°17′58″W

Links
- Public license information: Public file; LMS
- Website: www.firstalert4.com www.firstalert4.com/page/first-alert-4-is-on-abc/ (32.1)

KMOV (channels 4 and 32), branded as First Alert 4, is a television station in St. Louis, Missouri, United States, affiliated with CBS and ABC. It is owned by Gray Media alongside KDTL-LD (channel 32.2), a sports-oriented independent station. Both stations broadcast from studios on Progress Parkway in suburban Maryland Heights and share transmitter facilities in Lemay, Missouri.

Channel 4 in St. Louis was built by radio station KWK and began broadcasting on July 8, 1954, as KWK-TV. Its construction culminated six years of legal activity—prolonged by a federal freeze on new stations—and a contested battle to bring the city its second very high frequency (VHF) station. Operating from studios in the Globe-Democrat Tower Building, KWK-TV's early history was precarious. CBS at the time was fighting to build its own station in St. Louis, which could have left KWK-TV without network programming. Even though CBS won the construction permit for channel 11 in 1957, it opted to speed up its arrival into the market by instead buying KWK-TV. When CBS took over channel 4 on March 16, 1958, the station changed call signs to KMOX-TV, after CBS-owned KMOX radio. KMOX-TV was one of the network's five owned-and-operated stations. In 1968, KMOX radio and television moved to the new Gateway Tower in downtown St. Louis.

KMOX-TV led local news in the market in the late 1950s and early 1960s but fell behind KSD-TV (channel 5, now KSDK) in the ratings. This changed beginning in 1973, when—under general manager Tom Battista—KMOX-TV revamped its newscast with younger, more attractive personalities to increase female viewership. At the same time, KMOX-TV became the first station in the world to move to entirely electronic news gathering, ceasing the then-standard and time-intensive use of film to record news footage. In 1975, it was the first local station to feature a Black weeknight anchor, Julius Hunter. The station became competitive again and, in the late 1970s and early 1980s, became the most-watched news station in St. Louis. However, a retooled KSDK with popular entertainment programs took the lead back from KMOX-TV beginning in early 1984.

After incurring debt to fend off a hostile takeover by Ted Turner, CBS sold KMOX-TV to Viacom in 1986, and the station was renamed KMOV. Viacom slimmed down the operation and increased profits, partly through increased preemptions of network programming. While KMOV was able to fend off a challenge from KTVI (channel 2), whose news operation was at that time troubled, it was never able to move past KSDK for first in the St. Louis news ratings. In 1989, KMOV initiated hourly news updates throughout the day, a concept that for a time proved popular with local TV stations across the country.

Viacom merged with Paramount in 1994, then traded KMOV to the Belo Corporation in 1997 in exchange for a station in Seattle. Under Belo, KMOV strengthened; though unable to consistently catch KSDK in the late news ratings, the station became one of the highest-rated CBS affiliates for news in a major market. A 2007 series on schools in East St. Louis, Illinois, won the station its only Peabody Award. Belo sold itself to KSDK owner Gannett, prompting KMOV to be spun off to the Meredith Corporation. After seven years of Meredith ownership, Gray acquired KMOV in 2021. It moved the station from downtown St. Louis to Maryland Heights, rebranded it as First Alert 4, and introduced Matrix Midwest over KDTL-LD. On September 1, 2026, a subchannel of KMOV replaced KDNL-TV as the St. Louis market's ABC affiliate.

== KWK-TV: Construction and early years ==
On February 12, 1948, Thomas Patrick, Incorporated, filed with the Federal Communications Commission (FCC) seeking a construction permit to build a television station on channel 9 in St. Louis. The firm was the owner of St. Louis radio station KWK. In 1948, St. Louis had one operating television station—KSD-TV (channel 5, now KSDK)—and seven different applicants seeking the remaining four channels then allocated to the city. The field was deep, including the St. Louis Star-Times and its station KXOK; the St. Louis Globe-Democrat; WEW, then owned by Saint Louis University; 20th Century Fox; and the Lutheran Church – Missouri Synod, owner of KFUO. This field of applicants was forced to wait when the FCC, in October 1948, imposed a freeze on new TV station grants to sort out possible changes to television broadcast standards. During the freeze, the Globe-Democrat purchased a stake in KWK and abandoned its application for channel 13. KWK then moved into the new Globe-Democrat Tower Building at 12th Avenue and Cole Street, which had space set aside for a future television operation including a studio and room for a transmitter.

The freeze ended in April 1952, and St. Louis was allocated three very high frequency (VHF) channels in addition to channel 5. One, channel 9, was now reserved non-commercial educational. The other allocations were channels 4 and 11. KXOK and KWK filed for channel 4, along with several new entrants. The Meredith Engineering Company, a subsidiary of the Des Moines, Iowa–based Meredith Publishing Company, entered in August, followed by CBS—operator of KMOX radio in St. Louis—in October. A fifth firm, the Missouri Valley Television Company, filed in March 1953. It was headed by Stanley E. Hubbard of St. Paul, Minnesota, owner of that city's KSTP radio and television, and counted 38 St. Louis residents among its stockholders. Meredith dropped its application in April 1953, (Note: Meredith owned three stations and had three pending station applications when the FCC ruled that companies could only have as many applications as additional stations it could own—the limit being five—in February 1953.) and CBS amended its application in October 1953 to specify channel 11 instead of channel 4.

KWK, KXOK, and Missouri Valley Television headed toward a comparative hearing to decide who would be awarded channel 4. Arguments were scheduled to begin in the hearing on March 29, 1954, though this was later postponed. It never reached a hearing. On April 9, 1954, the parties reached an agreement to settle the case, granting KWK the channel and the other parties ownership options in the TV station. WTVI (channel 54) of Belleville, Illinois, an ultra high frequency (UHF) station, contested the grant but was unsuccessful in preventing the FCC from issuing the construction permit. KWK came into the television venture with preparation and resources. It had spent six months training personnel in television, already had purchased much of the studio equipment, already had a tower, and had a transmitter on order. The FM antenna on the Globe-Democrat Tower was removed in preparation for the tower to be extended to 480 feet (150 m) and the antenna for channel 4 to be installed. WTVI and another UHF outlet, KSTM-TV (channel 36), sought court stays of the construction permit and were denied.

KWK-TV began broadcasting on July 8, 1954. St. Louis finally had two VHF television stations, seven years after KSD-TV went on the air, and four in total including KSTM-TV and WTVI. Its first night's telecasting included a preview of CBS programs, three films, and a newscast.

In addition to CBS programming, KWK-TV offered a variety of local shows. Some came from KWK radio's disc jockeys, such as the game show Recallit and Win hosted by Tom Dailey and programs hosted by Ed Wilson and Gil Newsome. The station also offered local news, public affairs, and public service programming. A high school quiz bowl show, High School Quiz, aired on TV and radio. The country music program Western Jamboree debuted in early 1955.

KWK-TV's affiliation with CBS was designed to be temporary. Its affiliation contract stipulated that the network could move elsewhere subject to a 60-day notice. CBS programs moved from KSD-TV and WTVI to the new station. KWK-TV also aired some programs from the ABC network. WTVI assumed KSTM-TV's frequency after that station went off the air and moved to St. Louis in 1955 as KTVI, which moved to VHF channel 2 in April 1957.

== KMOX-TV: As a CBS owned-and-operated station ==
While KWK-TV was telecasting, CBS was in the lead in the channel 11 contest. An FCC examiner favored the network in an initial decision released in September 1955. In a 4–3 decision, the FCC granted CBS the channel 11 construction permit in March 1957. CBS intended to be on the air with KMOX-TV within four months from interim studios and have the new station's permanent facility, to be designed by Minoru Yamasaki, complete by the end of 1958. By August 1957, CBS's proposed start date for channel 11 had been pushed back to early 1958. As a result, CBS began looking into buying KWK-TV and handing the channel 11 permit to one of the competing applicants. The deal was confirmed in September 1957. CBS spent $4 million—$2.5 million for KWK-TV's television assets and $1.5 million for the studios owned by the Globe-Democrat—to buy channel 4. Channel 11 was assigned to 220 Television, one of the losing applicants, with two other competitors being paid $200,000 to drop out. The FCC approved the KWK-TV purchase in October.

CBS's simultaneous sale of the channel 11 permit and purchase of KWK-TV came under some scrutiny after the fact. A U.S. House subcommittee criticized CBS's move as "circumvention" of the FCC's applicant selection process, given that the commission had just favored CBS over 220 Television. The then-president of the Globe-Democrat told a reporter for the St. Louis Post-Dispatch in 1958 that there was concern that if CBS got channel 11 and KTVI and ABC moved to channel 2, KWK-TV might find itself without network affiliation. St. Louis Amusement Company, a losing applicant in the channel 11 battle, alleged that Tex McCrary engaged in illegal ex parte communications with FCC commissioners as a representative for CBS president William S. Paley.

CBS assumed control of KWK-TV on March 1, 1958, and changed its call sign to KMOX-TV on March 16. Coinciding with the call sign change, CBS overhauled the station's programming, extending morning broadcasting and adding several CBS shows previously unseen in St. Louis to the channel 4 lineup. Among the local additions was Eye on St. Louis, a nightly public affairs program. CBS announced it would build a new transmitter facility for KMOX-TV, which began use in March 1959. The 1,214-foot (370 m) structure in Lemay was also used to telecast channel 11, which began the following April as KPLR-TV.

The 10 p.m. newscast, heretofore 15 minutes, expanded to a full half-hour in 1963. However, the station slipped in the ratings after anchor Spencer Allen left the next year to head the news department at KTVI. With Allen gone, KSD-TV surpassed KMOX-TV as the news leader in St. Louis. In 1967, Leon Drew arrived from KNXT in Los Angeles to serve as KMOX-TV's new general manager. Under Drew, the station bulked up its news staff to add coverage on weekends, with new hires including Pat Fontaine—returning to the station after a stint as the weather girl on Today—and Jim Hart, the quarterback of the St. Louis Cardinals football team, for sports commentary. Allen returned as editorialist, a position in which he continued until 1972. In 1970, KMOX-TV added a second early evening newscast, giving it half-hours at 5 and 6 p.m. on either side of the CBS Evening News.

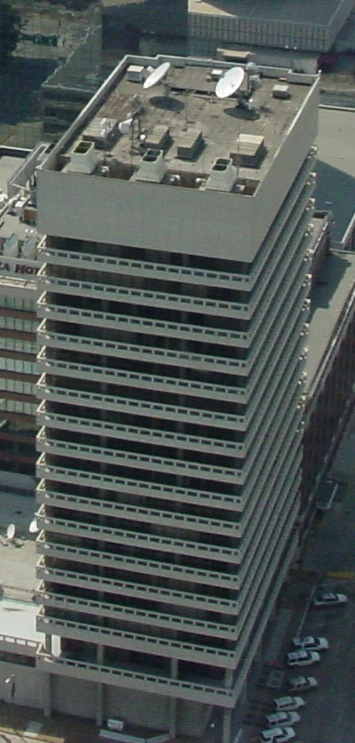
Gateway Tower housed KMOX-TV/KMOV from 1968 to 2023.

In 1966, CBS partnered with Transurban Redevelopment Corporation to build a new office building at 3rd and Market streets in downtown St. Louis containing studios for KMOX radio and television, which had been in separate locations. KMOX-TV began moving into the Gateway Tower in July 1968. The TV station occupied the first two floors of the facility, containing two studios (one with room for a studio audience) and a computerized control room.

=== The Battista years: Newsroom and ENG ===
In January 1972, CBS appointed Thomas Battista as general manager of KMOX-TV. Under Battista, the station sought to introduce new programs. That August, KMOX-TV debuted a Saturday night talk show, Regis Philbin's Saturday Night in St. Louis. The program was created because of strong ratings for the station's all-night movies. Battista had worked at the same station as Philbin in the early 1960s in San Diego and thought Philbin could bring something fresh to the market. Philbin flew to St. Louis once a month to record a month's worth of programs. In 1973, a Friday night prime time half-hour was added to Philbin's Saturday night show. Despite solid ratings, KMOX-TV canceled the program in 1975 due to its expense.

KMOX-TV's newscasts were next in line for a change. In February 1973, the 5 p.m. newscast began to originate live from the newsroom, a format that was installed at most of the CBS owned-and-operated stations. In 1973, Max Roby, a veteran anchor at KMOX, left that station in a dispute and moved to KSD-TV, then the number-one news station. His replacement was 30-year-old Patrick Emory, whom Battista described as "the alternative". With Emory's selection, Battista hoped to win over female viewers with a presentation and appearance that contrasted with the older anchors on KSD and KTVI. In another move, Battista hired KSD-TV's Julius Hunter to anchor the station's weekend newscasts.

After Emory's installation, the trend in the market swung to KMOX-TV, which had moved into a tie for first place by February 1974 but had emerged with a significant demographic lead among women aged 18–49, a group coveted by advertisers. By March 1975, KMOX-TV had the lead in ratings at 5, 6, and 10 p.m. over KSD-TV. In 1975, Battista was promoted to a corporate role with the CBS stations, and Emory was transferred to KNXT; within a year, CBS had sent KMOX-TV's general manager and news director, as well as weathercaster Ollie Raymond, to Los Angeles, where low ratings were a concern. Emory was replaced at 5 and 10 p.m. by the older Steve Schiff; Hunter was promoted to weeknights at 6, becoming the first Black weeknight anchor in St. Louis.

In parallel with the overhauling of the news operation came a technical change that made KMOX-TV a world-first. Beginning in late 1972, CBS began testing electronic news gathering (ENG) with miniature cameras and microwave transmission, instead of the use of film cameras, messengers, and film processing to get footage back from stories, first at WCAU-TV in Philadelphia and later at WCBS-TV in New York City. ENG made its St. Louis debut on March 6, 1973. KMOX-TV became the pilot station for the technology within the CBS owned-and-operated stations group, as well as CBS News, and the first station anywhere to fully discontinue film coverage and processing (in August 1974). By the end of the year, the station was broadcasting five stories live each week. ENG spread rapidly and, by the end of the decade, was seen to have had a significant impact on American television news.

One of the few losses of the Battista era was rights to show St. Louis Cardinals preseason football. The rights had continuously belonged to KMOX-TV through 1973, but the team awarded the contract to KSD-TV in 1974. This was reportedly because owner Bill Bidwill objected to former Cardinal quarterback Tim Van Galder, a KMOX-TV sports commentator, being involved in the telecasts.

=== Ratings success and decline ===
In 1976, KSD-TV hired Emory, returning him to the St. Louis market from Los Angeles. At the time, KMOX-TV and KSD-TV were about even in the ratings. This scenario remained the case for several years, but in late 1979 KMOX-TV moved decisively ahead of KSD-TV in late news. KMOX-TV had competition again a year later, this time from KTVI, a station whose newscasts had long rated third but improved beginning in the late 1970s and in the early years of Times Mirror ownership. In July 1981, a KTVI newscast won its time slot—beating out KMOX-TV—for the first time. But the period was regarded in hindsight as a zenith for KMOX-TV's news department. The pairing of the Jewish Schiff and the Black Hunter—promoted as "Lox and Hamhocks"—made KMOX-TV news the highest-rated of any of the CBS owned-and-operated stations. The station's lead was especially wide among women aged 18–49.

During this time, the station introduced a new local non-news program and was involved in a national experiment by CBS. Beginning in 1977, channel 4 aired the children's series D. B.'s Delight, a quiz show featuring local sixth-grade students and a puppet named Doorbell. It was so named to reuse a sign from another program that never made it to air. Two years later, KMOX-TV was used in pilots of teletext in the United States. CBS used the testing to decide that the French Antiope standard was superior to that used in the United Kingdom. Allan Cohen was named general manager of KMOX-TV in 1980.

After years of leading the St. Louis news market, in 1984 KMOX-TV suffered steep declines as KSDK moved into first place, fueled by much-improved prime time ratings from NBC, increasing the news ratings at 10 p.m., and two popular game shows: Jeopardy! and Wheel of Fortune. The game shows were the lead-in and lead-out to KSDK's 5 and 6 p.m. reports. In November 1984, KSDK led by four to five percentage points of audience share in all three timeslots. After two straight periods of declines, KMOX-TV fired Schiff and hired Dan Gray, who had previously worked at KSDK.

== KMOV ==
=== Viacom ownership ===
In 1985, CBS was the target of a hostile takeover attempt by Ted Turner. To fend off the attempt, the company repurchased $1 billion in shares. This incurred a new debt, and the company decided to try and divest $300 million in assets. On October 22, 1985, CBS announced that KMOX-TV was for sale, separating it from the company's St. Louis radio stations. One station broker contacted by Broadcasting predicted that the station would sell for $150 to $200 million. CBS would also benefit because the sale broke up cross-ownership, thus making the company eligible for a tax certificate if it invested sale proceeds in another media property. (Note: The certificate was apparently used to buy WCIX-TV in Miami and WWJ (AM) and WJOI radio in Detroit.) On December 6, 1985, CBS announced it was selling KMOX-TV to Viacom for $122.5 million; Viacom owned four other TV stations, all in smaller markets than St. Louis. The company believed it could find cost savings in reducing parts of the operation unique to a network-owned station.

The FCC approved the transaction in April 1986. It denied an objection by a group of home satellite dish owners who protested the companies' plans to encode satellite signals so home users could not view them. A clause in the sales agreement required Viacom to change the call sign from KMOX-TV. It selected KMOV (as in "move"), which became the new call sign on June 18, 1986. Under Viacom, the station increased its preemption of network prime time programs to 103 hours a year in 1987, the most among CBS affiliates. The move earned the station money in local advertising revenue but meant that nearly 10 percent of CBS's prime time programming went unseen. These and other changes attributable to no longer being owned by the CBS network, including overhauling the station's programming lineup and reducing staff, helped Viacom double revenues and triple profits between May 1986 and September 1987. In 1988, the station began airing a new local children's show, Gator Tales.

Viacom also set about the task of improving the station's flagging news ratings. At the time, KTVI was in disarray and ratings decline, hamstrung by turnover and poor corporate management, and KMOV targeted that station first. Over the next several years, KMOV acquired the services of several KTVI personalities, starting in late 1986 with consumer reporter Ellen Jaffe and anchor Larry Conners, who was teamed with Hunter on channel 4's evening newscasts; in March 1987, weekend anchor Russ Mitchell moved from KTVI to KMOV. In November 1986, KMOV was in second place, ahead of KTVI in all time periods but lagging KSDK which attracted as much as twice as many viewers. In 1988, KMOV debuted its first-ever noon newscast, and later that year, it hired former KTVI sportscaster Zip Rzeppa. During this time, the station also won a Alfred I. duPont–Columbia University Award for a five-part report, Sauget: City of Shame, on drunk driving in Sauget, Illinois.

Channel 4, under general manager Allan Cohen, seems to be always lusting after the magic bullet that will propel it into first place in the ratings. The hiring of Zip Rzeppa some five years ago was supposed to do that. The 24-hour news updates were supposed to do that. The Double Team and the St. Charles and the Illinois bureaus and the hysterical tabloid-TV sweeps series were supposed to do that, and now a new set and new graphics and gimmick piled upon gimmick and hyper-promotion are supposed to do that.

— Eric Mink, television critic, St. Louis Post-Dispatch

Having put distance between itself and KTVI, KMOV moved to take on KSDK. On February 26, 1989, it began airing 35-second news updates every hour, a concept it promoted as the "24-Hour News Source". Launched in secrecy so tight some station staff were not even aware when it launched, the project included KMOV's first-ever morning news cut-ins, a return to 24-hour broadcasting, and news bureaus in St. Charles, Missouri, and Fairview Heights, Illinois. The 24-hour updates were cited as a reason for KMOV posting ratings gains in its evening newscasts during 1989, narrowing the gap with KSDK, which was seen to have been unprepared for its competitor's move. KMOV popularized the concept, which was adopted by stations including in Pittsburgh, Miami, Cleveland, San Francisco, and Kansas City—as well as KSDK. Through the early 1990s, KMOV remained in second place in St. Louis news, but it suffered declines in viewership as KTVI showed improvement. The station worked to add more women to its evening news, including former KMOX reporter Mary Phelan and new meteorologist Trish Brown.

In June 1993, KMOV became the center of controversy when it was revealed that the station paid to fly a male prostitute from Kansas City to St. Louis as part of a report—which never aired—into sexual misconduct cases involving priests. The intention was for the prostitute to get a priest to reveal information about sexual activities of other priests in the Roman Catholic Diocese of Belleville. The St. Louis County District Attorney announced she would order a grand jury inquiry into the matter, and Edward Joseph O'Donnell, administrator of the Archdiocese of St. Louis, announced his intention to file an FCC complaint. In response, Viacom president Francis Patrick Brady issued an apology that KMOV broadcast. Charges were dropped on account of insufficient evidence, but the scandal tarnished the station's image in the Catholic community and prompted the resignations of news director Gary Whitaker and reporter Jeff Rainford.

By 1995, KMOV had debuted an hour-long morning newscast. In 1996–1997, the station carried a package of 10 St. Louis Blues hockey games under an agreement with Prime Sports; it had previously telecast games that conflicted with St. Louis Cardinals baseball commitments by KPLR.

=== Belo ownership ===
Viacom's 1994 acquisition of Paramount Pictures placed the company's existing television stations (KMOV; WNYT in Albany, New York; WVIT in New Britain, Connecticut; WHEC-TV in Rochester, New York; and KSLA-TV in Shreveport, Louisiana) under common ownership with Paramount's broadcasting arm, the Paramount Stations Group; the two groups were formally consolidated in December 1995. With its focus shifting to the new United Paramount Network (UPN), Viacom began to eye a sale of its major network affiliates. In November 1994, it accepted a bid from Smith Broadcasting Group and Jupiter Partners for all of the stations except Shreveport. The Smith-Jupiter bid proposed a minority investor, which under FCC rules of the time would have enabled Viacom to receive a federal tax certificate. However, after federal scrutiny of another tax certificate deal involving Viacom led to proposals to abolish the system altogether, Viacom reconsidered and canceled the deal.

Meanwhile, in 1996, the A. H. Belo Corporation found itself needing to divest a television station in Seattle. It already owned KIRO-TV and needed to sell it to buy KING-TV as part of its purchase of the Providence Journal Company. In November 1996, Paramount proposed a straight trade of KMOV for KIRO. At the time, KIRO was affiliated with UPN, and a swap was seen as providing stations that better fit both companies. Shortly after the Providence Journal purchase put KIRO on the market, Gaylord Broadcasting put Seattle-market CBS affiliate KSTW on the market. KSTW, which had taken the CBS affiliation from KIRO in 1995, had not been as successful as expected. It was sold to Cox Broadcasting in January 1997, but Cox faced the expensive task of trying to move KSTW's studios to Seattle from Tacoma to increase the station's value. The result was a three-way swap. On February 20, 1997, Paramount, Belo, and Cox Broadcasting engaged in a three-way trade involving KMOV and the two Seattle stations, with Belo exiting Seattle by buying KMOV, Cox buying KIRO to become that city's CBS affiliate again, and Paramount acquiring KSTW. Belo, which took over in June 1997, was seen to be more news-oriented than Viacom had been in running the station.

By the time Belo assumed ownership, KMOV was making up ratings ground on KSDK in the evening news. From May 1996 to May 1997, channel 4 had halved KSDK's 10 p.m. audience lead from twelve percentage points of audience share to five. However, it was not finding any way to narrow the gap in morning news. In November 1999, KMOV tied KSDK in late news for the first time in a decade, and in 2003, it logged its first outright lead. Even though KMOV emerged as one of the highest-rated CBS affiliates in a metered market for prime time and late news, KSDK continued to win the news races the vast majority of the time, and KSDK outbilled KMOV by $15 million in 2003 alone. By 2008, KMOV had the third-highest late newscast ratings of any station in the country.

The improved ratings coincided with investment and expansion. Belo invested money in the news department and added another seven hours a week of local news programming by February 1998. KMOV debuted a public affairs program, Imagine St. Louis, in partnership with the St. Louis Post-Dispatch in 1999 and added a Saturday morning newscast in 2000. In 2008, the lifestyle show Great Day St. Louis debuted in late mornings. In the decade, KMOV won two major national journalism awards for the same series. Left Behind: The Failure of East St. Louis Schools received a Peabody Award and a second duPont–Columbia Award.

Allan Cohen retired in 2012, ending a 32-year run through three different owners. In 2013, Conners was fired, ending a 25-year run with KMOV, after making social media comments incorrectly claiming that an interview with Barack Obama in 2012 led to adverse action by the Internal Revenue Service.

=== Meredith ownership ===
In June 2013, Belo announced it would be acquired by Gannett, owner of KSDK, in a $1.5 billion transaction. St. Louis was one of five markets where Belo's holdings either overlapped with another major Gannett TV station or a Gannett-owned newspaper. Gannett intended to provide services to these stations through joint sales and shared services agreements. These stations would have been owned by Sander Media, a company founded by former Belo executive Jack Sander. Several groups filed with the FCC opposing the use of Sander in the overlap markets as circumvention of the FCC's rules of the time and noting that Gannett could coordinate with Sander in retransmission consent and other areas. However, in St. Louis, the U.S. Department of Justice identified that a combination of KMOV and KSDK would end the rivalry that kept advertising rates low. It approved the transaction but ordered KMOV to be sold to an independent buyer.

Gannett completed the Belo transaction on December 23, 2013, and that same day announced the sale of KMOV and two stations in Phoenix to the Meredith Corporation. The $177 million deal for KMOV closed on February 28, 2014. In 2015, the station added newscasts at 4 a.m. and 4 p.m. and moved Great Day St. Louis to 9 a.m. That year, the station won another duPont–Columbia Award for The Injustice System, a documentary examining the killing of Michael Brown in Ferguson, Missouri.

Meredith attempted to make a duopoly in St. Louis when it filed to buy KPLR for $65 million in April 2018. Sinclair Broadcast Group, owner of KDNL-TV, had proposed to sell KPLR as part of its acquisition of Tribune Media, which also owned KTVI. Under FCC rules of the time, it could not own all three stations. However, the deal was held up by the Department of Justice for review, and Tribune moved to terminate the merger that August.

=== Gray ownership and ABC affiliation ===
On May 3, 2021, Gray Television announced its intent to purchase the Meredith Local Media division, including KMOV, for $2.7 billion. The sale was completed on December 1.

After more than 50 years in Gateway Tower, KMOV began exploring a relocation to Maryland Heights, a suburb in St. Louis County, in 2022. Population had shifted away from St. Louis city, making the location less central than it had been. That May, Gray acquired a three-story office building near Interstate 270. The facility, formerly home to biomedical company ERT, which offered good freeway access and a secured parking lot rather than the cumbersome mix of on-street and underground parking it had at Gateway Tower. It was renovated to contain two studios, one for news and the other for lifestyle programs. The station began broadcasting from the facility in December 2023 and rebranded as First Alert 4 coinciding with the move. By 2024, the station had introduced several new programs, including the afternoon show My St. Louis Live and sports program The Nightcap on 4, and was the leader in the morning news and late news ratings races. As of June 2026, KMOV aired 30 hours a week of local news programming.

On September 1, 2026, KMOV began airing ABC programming as the network's new affiliate in St. Louis, taking over from KDNL-TV. ABC airs on channel 32.1, which formerly aired programming from Matrix Midwest, which was moved to sister station KDTL-LD (channel 32.2).

== Matrix Midwest ==
In 2024, Gray launched Matrix Midwest, an over-the-air regional sports network with programming about Missouri Tigers athletics as well as other sports programming, using virtual channel 32.1. The channel position had previously been used for KMOV's subchannel with MyNetworkTV programming. The feed was moved to channel 32.2 on September 1, 2026, as a result of 32.1 airing ABC programming.

Matrix Midwest also airs Missouri Valley Conference basketball games. The St. Louis Blues aired three regular-season games on Matrix Midwest, two of which were simulcast on KMOV–CBS, during the 2024–25 season; Blues ancillary programming such as classic games and the Blues Hall of Fame induction ceremony also aired on the channel.

In 2025, KMOV and Matrix Midwest aired 10 simulcasts of FanDuel Sports Network Midwest telecasts of St. Louis Cardinals baseball. The team renewed the partnership in 2026, after FanDuel Sports Network folded.

== Notable former on-air staff ==
- Gary Bender – sportscaster, 1975–1977
- Bob Buck – sportscaster, 1971–1975
- Joe Buck – sports reporter, 1992–1993
- Richelle Carey – reporter and morning anchor, 2003–2006
- Penny Crone – reporter, 1973–1975
- Dan Dierdorf – sports director and 10 p.m. sports anchor, 1986–1987
- Joe Fowler – sportscaster, 1985–1986
- Roger Grimsby – newscaster, 1959–1961
- Jim Hart – sportscaster, 1968
- Julius Hunter – reporter and anchor, 1974–2002
- Jim Kincaid – reporter and anchor, c. 1960s
- Linda Lorelle – reporter, 1987–1989
- Russ Mitchell – reporter and weekend anchor, 1987–1992
- Buddy Moreno – host of The Buddy Moreno Show, 1958
- Regis Philbin – talk show host, 1972–1975
- Zip Rzeppa – sports director, 1988–1995
- Steve Savard – sports anchor, 1994–2013; news anchor, 2013–2020
- Barry Serafin – anchor/reporter, 1968–1969
- Anne State – weekend morning anchor and reporter, 2000–2002
- Robin Smith – reporter and anchor, 1978–2015
- Tim Van Galder – sportscaster, 1973–1986
- Bob Wilson – sports director, 1969–1971
- Al Wiman – medical reporter, 1974–2000
- Reynolds Wolf – meteorologist, 2005–2006

== Technical information ==
KMOV's transmitter is located in Lemay, Missouri. Its signal is multiplexed:

Subchannels of KMOV
Subchannel	Res.	Short name	Programming
4.1	1080i	KMOV-HD	CBS
4.2	480i	1stAlrt	First Alert Weather Now / MyNetworkTV
4.3	480i	COZI-TV	Cozi TV
4.4	480i	Mystery	Ion Mystery
11.4	480i	365BLK	365BLK (KPLR-TV)
32.1	720p	ABC	ABC
32.2	480i	MATRIX	Matrix Midwest (KDTL-LD)

Simulcast of subchannels of another station
Broadcast on behalf of another station

KMOV began broadcasting a digital signal in October 1999 on channel 56. It ceased analog broadcasts on the digital transition date of June 12, 2009. Its digital signal had moved the preceding January 20 to channel 24, which was vacated at that time by the analog signal of KNLC.
