= Jim Kincaid =

American news reporter, anchor and essayist (1934–2011)

James W. Kincaid (October 23, 1934 – July 17, 2011) was an American television news correspondent for ABC News and local news anchor for WVEC in Norfolk, Virginia, for over 18 years.

== Biography and early career ==
Kincaid was born on October 23, 1934, in Houston, Texas, to the late Herbert and Ethel Schulze. His mother was an avid amateur painter of flowers. He grew up in Arkansas, often joking that his parents "moved there as soon as they heard about it". He started working for a radio station there in 1949, then served three years in the United States Army after being drafted in 1956. In 1960, he joined WWL in New Orleans, Louisiana, where he won a National Gold Bell award for his reporting on the death of Pope John XXIII in 1963. He later moved to what was then KMOX-TV (now KMOV) and WCBS-TV before moving to ABC News. Married three times, two of his marriages ended in divorce.

== Network correspondent ==
Hired to work as a network correspondent, Kincaid reported in Vietnam for ABC in 1969, at the height of the Vietnam War. A military helicopter in which Kincaid was riding was shot down by rocket fire near the village of Bu Dop. He sustained a broken back in the crash and spent several months recovering in Hong Kong.

== WVEC-TV ==
In 1978, Kincaid left ABC to become the local news anchor for WVEC. During his time with WVEC, he returned to Vietnam to do a special series of stories covering the changes that had taken place over the previous 25 years. While shooting the award-winning documentary, Kincaid reunited a Vietnamese refugee with her family in Ho Chi Minh City. The woman, Norfolk resident Thao Nguyen, left Vietnam by boat in the 1970s with her infant daughter, and had not seen her family in over 20 years.

Kincaid also wrote a documentary in 1995 entitled "D-Day to VE Day". Three D-Day veterans from the Norfolk area accompanied Jim to several historic World War II sites, including Weymouth, England, Omaha Beach, Bastogne, the Dachau concentration camp, and Margraten in the Netherlands, site of the largest American cemetery in Europe. In 1996, Kincaid stepped down as WVEC's primary news anchor; he continued with the station as a commentator until his retirement.

Jim Kincaid authored several books, with collections of his humorous anecdotes.

His books "Theo" and" Anna's Eyes" were published in 1994 and 2002 respectively. They tell the story of his beloved father-in-law, Theo Wildanger, an accomplished artist.

== Post-news career and death ==
In 1997, Kincaid left WVEC. He and his wife Catherine moved to a farm which he owned near Elam, an unincorporated area in Virginia's Prince Edward County. In 2006, they moved into a community near Longwood University in Farmville, Virginia. While retired from the news business, Kincaid continued to work, providing narration and voice-over work. Kincaid died of a heart attack on July 17, 2011, at the age of 76.
