= Malcolm Briggs =

English footballer

Personal information
- Full name: Malcolm Douglas Briggs
- Date of birth: 14 September 1961 (age 65)
- Place of birth: Sunderland, England
- Position: Forward

Youth career
- 1977–1979: Birmingham City

Senior career*
Years	Team	Apps	(Gls)
1979–1980	Birmingham City	1	(0)
1980–19??	Durham City		
- * Club domestic league appearances and goals

Malcolm Douglas Briggs (born 14 September 1961) is an English former professional footballer born in Sunderland who played in the Football League for Birmingham City. When he left school in 1977, he joined Birmingham City as an apprentice, and turned professional two years later. Briggs had not yet established himself as a reserve-team regular when manager Jim Smith unexpectedly named him as substitute for the First Division match away at Manchester City on 1 May 1979. He made his debut coming on to replace Alan Buckley for what turned out to be a three-minute Football League career. He left the club to join Durham City in August 1980.
