= Zip Rzeppa =

American novelist

Christopher Edward "Zip" Rzeppa (born January 8, 1952) is an American Catholic evangelist, author, and former journalist who is the founder and executive director of Mater Media, a Catholic nonprofit apostolate aiming to "make Jesus Christ more known and more loved by more people through media".

== Early life and career ==
He attended Brother Rice High School in Metro Detroit, where he played football and basketball. After high school, he attended Boston University, where he earned a degree in journalism and was a member of the basketball team. At Boston University, he was a classmate of both Howard Stern and Bill O'Reilly.

After college, Rzeppa began his professional broadcasting career announcing Boston University football and hockey games. He worked at WANE-TV in Fort Wayne, Indiana, and then at WNEM-TV in Saginaw, Michigan. His next stop was WLWT in Cincinnati, where he recorded 'The Ballad of the Bengals', a local hit song celebrating the Cincinnati Bengals. He then went to WNEV-TV in Boston, where he was reunited with Bill O'Reilly, who had recently been hired as a news anchor.

== St. Louis ==
After leaving WNEV-TV, Rzeppa was hired by KTVI in St. Louis, MO, where he became popular for his Friday night Zippo Awards for "The best, the worst, and the weirdest performances in the wild and wacky wonderful world of sports." At KTVI, a years-long rift began with Whitey Herzog, after the Cardinals manager thought Rzeppa was trying to get him fired. Still, his Q rating remained among the highest in the country. After Rzeppa moved to KMOV in St. Louis, his interns included future well-known broadcaster Joe Buck. He also started 'Sunday Nights with Bernie', a segment featuring NHL Hall of Famer Bernie Federko. In total, Rzeppa anchored more than 8,000 local TV sportscasts. In 2014, the St. Louis Media History Foundation inducted Rzeppa into its Media Hall of Fame.

Rzeppa was also the founder of Radio Personalities, Inc., which syndicated radio programs, including Talkin' Roundball with Dick Vitale, Offsides with Dan Dierdorf, and The Great American Sports Trivia Show.

== Charity and faith ==
After leaving broadcasting, Rzeppa entered the not-for-profit world. He worked for MERS/Goodwill Industries (1996-2003), the St. Louis Council of the Society of St. Vincent de Paul (2006-2011), and Angels’ Arms (2011-2012). He is the Founder and current Executive Director of Mater Media, a Catholic apostolate devoted to evangelizing the Catholic faith through book publishing, funding and promoting faith-filled major motion pictures, sponsoring concerts, and presenting marriage enrichment events. He is the author of two books, ‘My Rock & Salvation’ (2014), a novel for teens, and ‘For A Greater Purpose: My Life Journey’ (2015), an autobiography.
