= Theodore Wildanger =

French painter

Theodore Wildanger (May 1905 – 1989) was a painter born in France who later lived in Virginia. Some of his expressionist paintings are in the style of Marc Chagall. His credo was "Art and Dreams have no Bounds." A paperback book by Jim Kincaid, Theo, was published in 1994.

== Early life ==
Theodore Wildanger was born May 25, 1905, in Aumetz in northeastern France to Pierre Wildanger and Catherine née Boehles. Pierre was a miner born date and place unknown. Catherine Boehles was born in Bavaria. Theo was the youngest in a working-class family of 12 children. As World War I got underway, Theo had to fend for himself in Aumetz by herding cows for a local farmer in return for a daily meal.

As a youngster he was employed in the iron ore mine where his father works. A tram accident claimed part of his right hand. This probably prompted his decision to never go into a mine again. Next he had a brief apprenticeship with a local baker where the dusty conditions aggravated a lung condition which forced Theo to cut short this career.

== Adult years ==
Theo met Anne-Marie Thekes (Anna) at a dance in the nearby village of Grevenmacher just over the border with Luxembourg. Anna was the daughter of wine growers along the Moselle River in Luxembourg. She was born in Grevenmacher in 1907 to Mathias Thekes born 1866 and Barbe Waldbillig born 1868. There was some initial animosity in the village to the courtship. They married in 1928 and moved to Paris where they lived for a number of years.

Anna longed to be an actress and Theo wanted to learn all about art and artists. He found employ in an Italian count's gallery and learned the antiques business. Anna was employed by the count's wife. They were surrounded by the vivid art scene in Paris. Eventually, they returned to Anna's native country where they proceeded to build their business selling books, school supplies, and tobacco products. Two of their children were born there, Mathis in 1935 and Catherine in 1942.

When the Allies moved in to push the Germans back across the Moselle River, the family was evacuated to Luxembourg City. The third child, Pierre Jacques, was born there in December 1944. The family remained there until a few years after Anna's death in 1959 from leukemia.

=== Mathis Wildanger ===
Theo was instrumental in developing his elder son Mathis's artistic talent. Mathis Wildanger attended various European academies. He received at the young age of 21 the “Medaille Officielle de la Ville de Paris” at the Cercle Volnay in 1956, a distinction usually reserved for more well-known artists. Mathis remained in Luxembourg, married, and developed a prosperous artistic career. He died in 2003.

== Career ==
Five or six years after Anna's death, Theo left Luxembourg for Brussels, Belgium, with his younger son Pierre Jacques. He established an antique shop around the corner from the Grand Place. Theo made his living in the antiques trade and met famous artists like Jacques Brel and befriended many painters, among them Rene Magritte. He started to paint in earnest. Eventually he left Brussels to live with his daughter Catherine in Texas, Frankfurt/Main, Washington D.C. Finally, in 1977 he settled in Elam, Virginia. By now, he was in his later years and enjoyed freedom from daily worries. It was his happiest time since Paris with Anna. Theo died in 1989 in Norfolk, Virginia.

=== Art ===
Having no formal training, he developed different styles throughout his career. Even so, he didn't start painting until later in life, he had mentally recorded places and events. For example, he painted in 1969 “The Farmhouse at Aumetz” where he had herded cows as a young boy. Some of his paintings from the 1960s reflect street scenes in France, Belgium, and Germany e.g. Miltenberg, Bavaria painted in 1971. His time in Texas resulted in “Canyon Dam” and the “Covered Wagon” series. He was inspired to paint the Chincoteague Ponies by a trip there when he was living in Silver Spring, Maryland in 1975.

Then there is the painting of his wife Anna done in a modernist style which is reflected later in some of his abstracts.

His dreamy image of an infant brings to mind Marc Chagall.

Theo's love for Elam is recorded in a number of paintings of the log farmhouse during different seasons. Theo lived at Elam full-time. The farm became both the subject and the context for much of his art e.g. “Sunrise at Elam” and “Washday at Elam”. Sometimes, when regular painting surfaces were in short supply, he found alternative materials such as an old cabinet door, a piece of wood, or ragged tin pieces. One of his major works titled “Chaos” was painted on a piece of roofing tin found on the farm. Pieces of driftwood became strange totemic creatures. Throughout his life he was fond of flowers and still life with wine and candles. He would paint them as if they were his tribute to nature (Fleurs et Vin). The hard winter and tough times in the first years on the farm show up in “Winter” depicting a couple carrying logs, with dog Fifi in tow.

== Exhibits/Galleries ==
1971 Langen bei Frankfurt/Main, Germany

1975 Le Cercle Francais, Parish House Lafayette Park, Washington D.C.

1993 Harbor Gallery, Norfolk, Virginia

1994 Palmer Rae Gallery, Norfolk, Virginia

2003 Portsmouth Art & Cultural Center, Virginia

2012 Stravitz Gallery, Virginia Beach, Virginia

== Legacy ==
Much of Theo's collection is kept in Williamsburg, Virginia where Catherine, his daughter, is the custodian. Many of his works are now in private collections. Others were given by the artist to neighbors, friends, and handymen working on the Elam farm.
