= Cindy Preszler =

American journalist

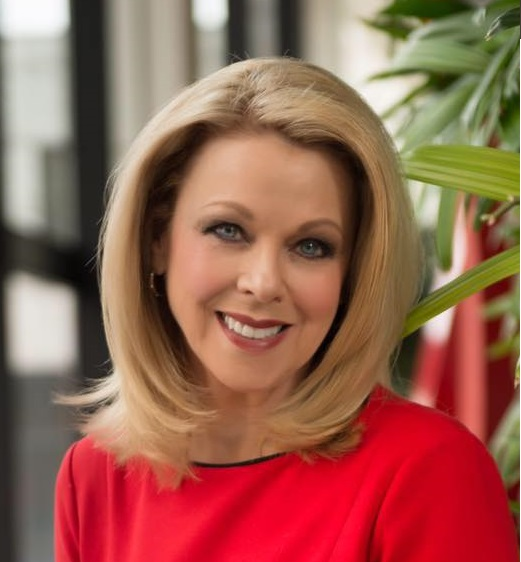

Cindy Preszler is a former on-air meteorologist with CBS-owned WFOR-TV in Miami, Florida, prior to retiring in September, 2024. She was previously with WFTX-TV, in Fort Myers, Florida, and WeatherSTL.com, a dynamic, interactive site she created and owned that delivered up-to-date weather information for the Greater St. Louis metro area, from 2016 through January, 2019. She was the chief meteorologist at KSDK, the NBC affiliate in St. Louis, Missouri, from 1998 until 2016. Prior to arriving in St. Louis in October, 1998, the South Dakota native worked at several TV stations, including Chicago's NBC-owned WMAQ-TV, as well as on The Weather Channel (1987–92). Preszler was the first female meteorologist to cover a landfalling hurricane at the Weather Channel, and has won five regional Emmy awards (including 17 nominations). She was also awarded an AP Award for feature story, six Missouri Broadcasters awards (15 nominations), one Illinois Broadcasters award, and was a fill-in for both NBC's Today and CBS This Morning. She previously chaired the AMS Broadcast Conference, and was featured in Sport Illustrated's "Women of Weather." She is currently a member of and/or holds the American Meteorological Society Seal of Approval, the National Weather Association Seal, and the International Association of Broadcast Meteorology.
