= Karen Foss =

American journalist and broadcaster

Karen Foss, born Karen Colleen Graham in Kansas City, Kansas in 1944, is an American journalist and businesswoman. She was an anchorwoman on KSDK in St. Louis, Missouri from 1979 until December 28, 2006. Foss won six Emmys, two for best anchor, named media personality of the year, and acquired the highest “Q” rating as the best-known news reader in the local market. In 2005, she was inducted into the Silver Circle by the National Academy of Television Arts and Sciences for her 25 years of journalistic excellence by the NATAS Mid-America Chapter. Before her work at KSDK, she began her television career at KCMO-TV (now KCTV), in Kansas City, Missouri.

Foss was named vice president for public relations for the utility company Ameren on February 21, 2007.

== Retirement from broadcasting ==
On Monday, December 18, 2006, Karen Foss announced her retirement from KSDK. Her last day on-air aired on Thursday, December 28, 2006. She has served St. Louis anchoring the news for 27 years. Foss says her own research indicates that she has been the oldest woman anchoring the 10 p.m. news at any TV station in the country. "I'm very proud of that," she said. Mayor Francis Slay officially made December 28, 2006, as "Karen Foss Day" in St. Louis.
