= List of television stations in Missouri =

This is a list of broadcast television stations that are licensed in the U.S. state of Missouri.

== Full-power ==
- Stations are arranged by media market served and channel position.

Full-power television stations in Missouri
Media market	Station	Channel	Primary affiliation(s)	Notes	Refs
Jefferson City–Columbia	KMOS-TV	6	PBS	(Note: Licensed to Sedalia, Missouri.)	
Jefferson City–Columbia	KOMU-TV	8	NBC, The CW on 8.3	(Note: Licensed to Columbia, Missouri.)	
Jefferson City–Columbia	KRCG	13	CBS		
Jefferson City–Columbia	KMIZ	17	ABC, MyNetworkTV on 17.3, Fox on 17.4		
Jefferson City–Columbia	KFDR	25	CTN		
Joplin	KODE-TV	12	ABC		
Joplin	KSNF	16	NBC		
Joplin	KOZJ	26	PBS	(Note: Satellite of KOZK.)	
Kansas City	WDAF-TV	4	Fox		
Kansas City	KCTV	5	CBS		
Kansas City	KMBC-TV	9	ABC		
Kansas City	KTAJ-TV	16	TBN	(Note: Licensed to St. Joseph, Missouri.)	
Kansas City	KCPT	19	PBS		
Kansas City	KCWE	29	The CW		
Kansas City	KSHB-TV	41	NBC		
Kansas City	KPXE-TV	50	Ion Television		
Kansas City	KSMO-TV	62	MyNetworkTV		
Springfield	KYTV	3	NBC, ABC on 33.1, The CW on 33.2		
Springfield	KOLR	10	CBS		
Springfield	KOZK	21	PBS		
Springfield	KOZL-TV	27	MyNetworkTV		
Springfield	KRBK	49	Fox	(Note: Licensed to Osage Beach, Missouri.)	
St. Joseph	KQTV	2	ABC		
St. Louis	KTVI	2	Fox		
St. Louis	KMOV	4	CBS, ABC on 32.1		
St. Louis	KSDK	5	NBC		
St. Louis	KETC	9	PBS		
St. Louis	KPLR-TV	11	The CW		
St. Louis	KNLC	24	MeTV		
St. Louis	KDNL-TV	30	Independent		
~Quincy, IL	KHQA-TV	7	CBS, ABC on 7.2	(Note: Licensed to Hannibal, Missouri.)	
~Ottumwa, IA	KTVO	3	ABC, CBS on 3.2	(Note: Licensed to Kirksville, Missouri.)	
~Paducah, KY	KFVS-TV	12	CBS, The CW on 12.2	(Note: Licensed to Cape Girardeau, Missouri.)	
~Paducah, KY	KPOB-TV	15	ABC	(Note: Licensed to Poplar Bluff, Missouri.) (Note: Satellite of WSIL-TV.)	
~Paducah, KY	KBSI	23	Fox, MyNetworkTV on 23.2		

== Low-power ==
Low-power television stations in Missouri
Media market	Station	Channel	Primary affiliation(s)	Notes	Refs
Jefferson City–Columbia	K06PT-D	15	Various		
Jefferson City–Columbia	K25QT-D	20	[Blank]		
Jefferson City–Columbia	K21PD-D	21	[Blank]		
Jefferson City–Columbia	KQFX-LD	22	Fox		
Jefferson City–Columbia	K23LE-D	23	[Blank]		
Jefferson City–Columbia	KRMS-LD	32	Various	(Note: Licensed to Lake Ozark, Missouri.)	
Jefferson City–Columbia	K33MN-D	33	Silent		
Jefferson City–Columbia	K35OY-D	35	Various		
Jefferson City–Columbia	KGKM-LD	36	Telemundo		
Joplin	KGCS-LD	21	YTA TV		
Joplin	K36II-D	36	Religious independent		
Joplin	K41NJ-D	41	IBN Television		
Joplin	KRLJ-LD	45	Various		
Joplin	KJLN-LD	50	Various		
Kansas City	KUKC-LD	14	Univision		
Kansas City	KAJF-LD	21	Various		
Kansas City	KCKS-LD	25	Various		
Kansas City	KGKC-LD	39	Telemundo		
Kansas City	KCMN-LD	42	Various		
Kansas City	KCDN-LD	43	Daystar		
Kansas City	K15MB-D	45	HSN		
Kansas City	KQML-LD	46	Various		
Springfield	KKSP-LD	4	Heroes & Icons	(Note: Licensed to Marshfield, Missouri.)	
Springfield	KRFT-LD	8	Various		
Springfield	K17DL-D	17	Tourist info	(Note: Licensed to Branson, Missouri.)	
Springfield	KFKY-LD	20	Various		
Springfield	KYCW-LD	24	The CW		
Springfield	KSPR-LD	33	ABC, The CW on 33.2		
Springfield	KJNM-LD	33.3	MeTV, Telemundo on 33.6	(Note: Licensed to Cassville, Missouri.)	
Springfield	KBNS-CD	36	Tourist info		
Springfield	K36NN-D	38	Religious independent	(Note: Licensed to West Plains, Missouri.)	
Springfield	KSFZ-LD	41	Various		
Springfield	KCNH-LD	47	Various		
St. Joseph	KNPG-LD	21	NBC, The CW on 21.2, Telemundo on 21.3		
St. Joseph	KNPN-LD	26	Fox, CBS on 26.2		
St. Joseph	KCJO-LD	30	CBS, Telemundo on 30.3		
St. Louis	KPTN-LD	7	Various		
St. Louis	WXSL-LD	14	Various		
St. Louis	K15KP-D	15	HSN		
St. Louis	KEFN-CD	20	Intrigue TV		
St. Louis	K25NG-D	25	Various		
St. Louis	KDTL-LD	32	Matrix Midwest/MyNetworkTV	(Note: Primary channel is mapped out over KMOV's spectrum.)	
St. Louis	KBGU-LD	33	Various		
St. Louis	WODK-LD	45	Various		
St. Louis	WLEH-LD	48	Various		
St. Louis	KUMO-LD	51	Daystar		
~Paducah, KY	KDKZ-LD	18	Independent	(Note: Licensed to Farmington, Missouri.)	

== Translators ==
Television station translators in Missouri
Media market	Station	Channel	Translating	Notes	Refs
Jefferson City	K18KK-D	18	KQFX-LD		
Kansas City	KMJC-LD	25	KCKS-LD		
~Paducah, KY	K10KM-D	10	WSIL-TV		
~Paducah, KY	K17LV-D	17	KFVS-TV		

== Defunct ==
- KACY Festus (1953–1954)
- KCIT-TV Kansas City (1969–1971)
- KCTY Kansas City (1953–1954)
- KSPR Springfield (1983–2017)
- KSTM-TV St. Louis (1953–1954)
- WHB-TV Kansas City (1953–1954, shared time with KMBC-TV)
