= KYCW =

KYCW may refer to:

- KYCW-LD, a low-power television station (channel 24) licensed to serve Branson, Missouri, United States
- KSPR-LD, a low-power television station (channel 15) licensed to serve Springfield, Missouri, United States, which held the call sign KYCW-LD from 2016 to 2017
- KPTR (AM), a radio station (1090 AM) licensed to serve Seattle, Washington, United States, which held the call sign KYCW from 1999 to 2004
- KJAQ, a radio station (96.5 FM) licensed to serve Seattle, Washington, United States, which held the call sign KYCW from 1994 to 1999
