= CW 17 =

CW 17 may refer to the following television stations in the U.S. affiliated with The CW:

== Current ==
=== Owned-and-operated ===
- KGET-DT2 in Bakersfield, California
- WPHL-TV in Philadelphia, Pennsylvania

=== Affiliates ===
- WCWJ in Jacksonville, Florida
- WPCH-TV in Atlanta, Georgia
- WZTV-DT2 in Nashville, Tennessee

== Former ==
- K17DL-D in Branson, Missouri (2006–2009)
- WDBB in Birmingham, Alabama (2006–2026)
