= KMOS-TV =

Television station in Sedalia, Missouri

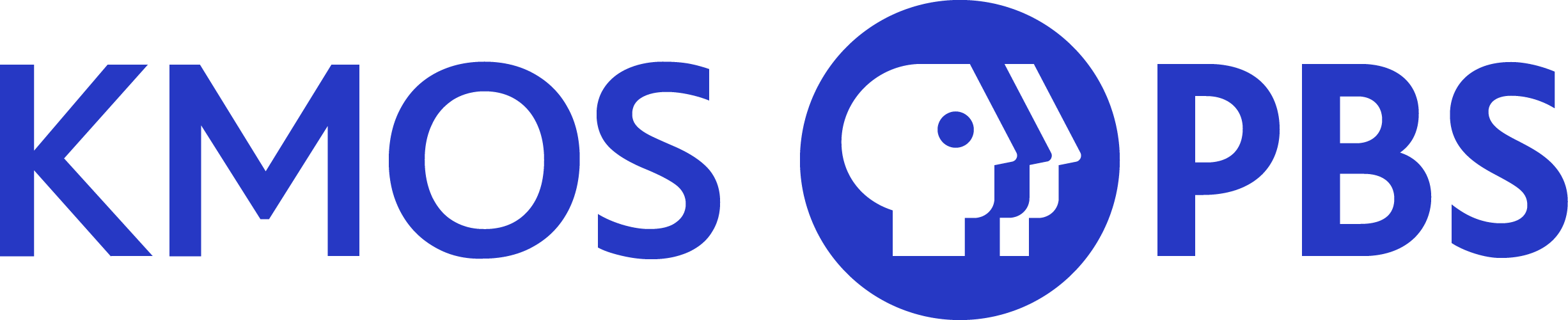

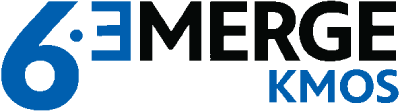
- Sedalia–Warrensburg–; Columbia–Jefferson City, Missouri; United States
- City: Sedalia, Missouri
- Channels: Digital: 15 (UHF); Virtual: 6
- Branding: KMOS PBS; KMOS Emerge (6.3)

Programming
- Affiliations: 6.1: PBS; for others, see § Subchannels

Ownership
- Owner: University of Central Missouri

History
- First air date: July 8, 1954
- Former call signs: KDRO-TV (1954–1959)
- Former channel numbers: Analog: 6 (VHF, 1954–2009)
- Former affiliations: Independent (1954–1958); ABC (1958–1961); CBS (1961–1978); ABC (secondary, 1961–1971); Silent (1978–1979)
- Call sign meaning: "For the very Most in entertainment!" (former slogan); -or-; Missouri Sedalia

Technical information
- Licensing authority: FCC
- Facility ID: 4326
- ERP: 322 kW
- HAAT: 603 m (1,978 ft)
- Transmitter coordinates: 38°37′36″N 92°52′4″W

Links
- Public license information: Public file; LMS
- Website: www.kmos.org

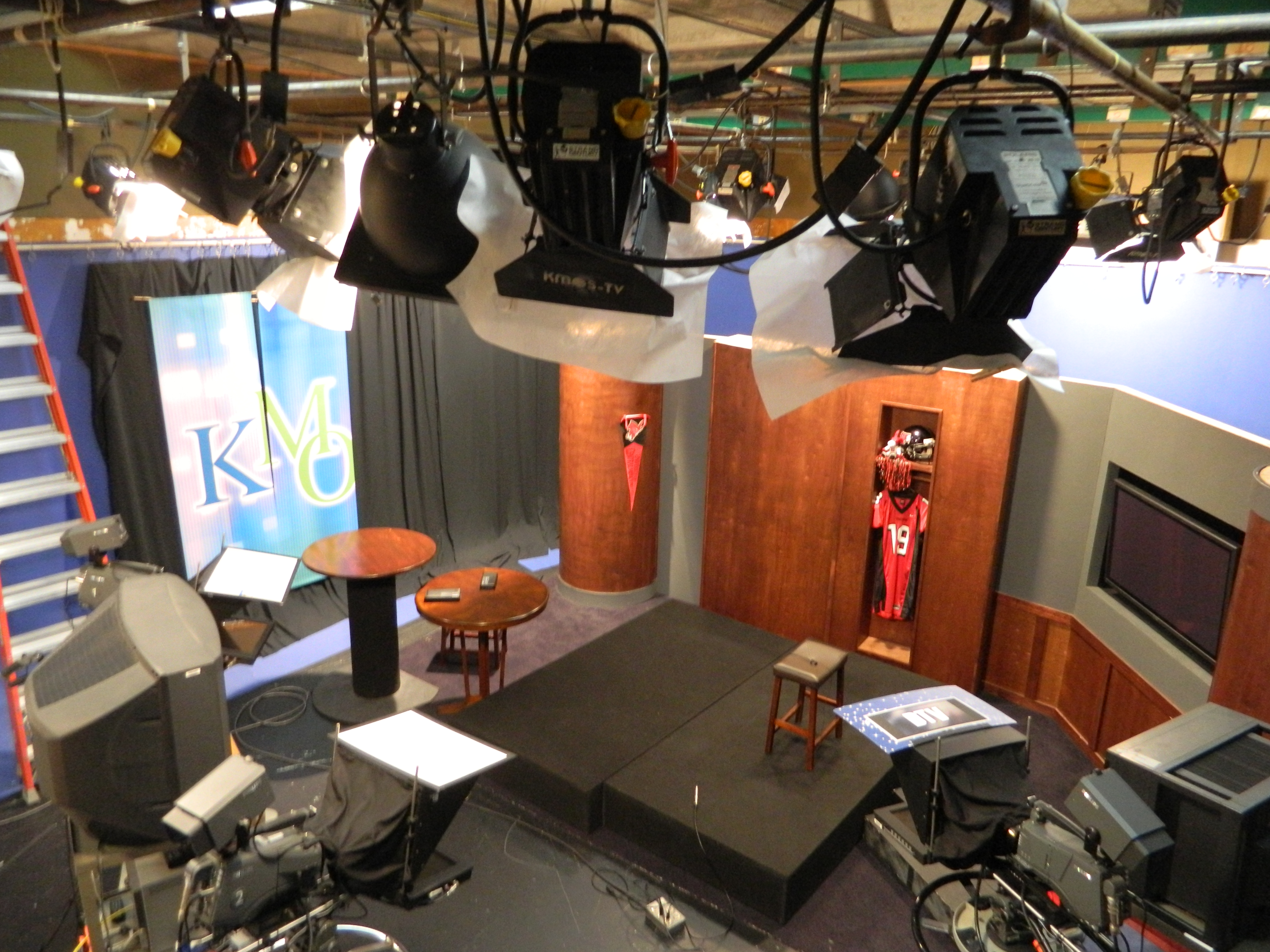
KMOS-TV studio

KMOS-TV (channel 6) is a PBS member television station licensed to Sedalia, Missouri, United States. The station is owned by the University of Central Missouri in Warrensburg. KMOS-TV's studios are located in the Patton Broadcast Center on the UCM campus on East Clark Street, and its transmitter is located in Syracuse, Missouri.

Although Sedalia and Warrensburg are part of the Kansas City television market (in fact, Warrensburg is an outer-ring suburb of Kansas City), KMOS is the PBS member station of record for the Columbia–Jefferson City market. One consequence is that KMOS cannot be seen on DirecTV or Dish Network in its own city of license; KCPT is the sole PBS station uplinked on the Kansas City feed. However, it is carried on Charter Spectrum cable systems in Sedalia and Warrensburg as one of two Mid-Missouri stations provided (alongside ABC affiliate KMIZ, channel 17).

Until February 17, 2009, KMOS also competed with KETC, the St. Louis PBS member station, on Mediacom cable systems in the market. KETC has since been dropped from Mediacom's systems in Columbia and Jefferson City as of February 17, leaving KMOS to be the sole PBS station in these areas.

== History ==
KMOS-TV signed on July 8, 1954, as KDRO-TV, owned by Milt Hinlein along with KDRO radio. The calls came from the Drolich brothers, the radio station's original owners. The station was originally an independent.

KDRO-TV went through several partial changes in ownership in the late 1950s. In July 1955, Deare Publications, publisher of the Sedalia Democrat newspaper, purchased 50% of KDRO-AM-TV from Hinlein. In July 1957, Jimmy Glenn and Herb Brandes purchased a two-thirds interest in KDRO radio; Hinlein became the sole owner of KDRO-TV as Deare Publications became the owner of the KDRO studio properties.

In November 1957, Hinlein sold one-half interest in KDRO-TV to several station employees, who took over the operation of the station. On July 20, 1958, KDRO-TV became an ABC affiliate. ABC refused to give it a network feed to protect the rights of Kansas City's main ABC affiliate, KMBC-TV (channel 9). Station engineers switched to and from KMBC-TV's signal whenever ABC network programming was on the air. Cook Paint and Varnish Company, owner of KMBC-TV, then bought KDRO-TV on January 28, 1959, and changed the call letters to the current KMOS-TV. The station used the slogan "For the very MOST in entertainment!", with the KMOS-TV call letters being used to emphasize the word "most". It then became a full-time satellite of KMBC-TV. The station had always found the going difficult due to a limited viewer base, and becoming a full satellite of KMBC-TV ensured its survival.

In December 1960, Cook Paint sold KMBC-TV to Metropolitan Broadcasting (later called Metromedia). Metropolitan Broadcasting did not want KMOS, so it sold channel 6 to the Jefferson City News Tribune, owner of Mid-Missouri's CBS affiliate, KRCG (channel 13). KMOS then became a semi-satellite of KRCG. It simulcast KRCG for most of the day but maintained the studio in Sedalia and would break away from KRCG for its own newscasts at 6 and 10 p.m. In July 1966, KMOS and KRCG were sold to Kansas City Southern Industries, the parent company of the Kansas City Southern Railroad.

By the mid-1960s, Mid-Missouri was just barely large enough for three full network affiliates. However, KRCG and NBC affiliate KOMU-TV (channel 8) in Columbia were the only VHF network affiliates in the Columbia/Jefferson City market, and wanted to keep it that way. With this in mind, KRCG operated KMOS at a fairly low power level and turned down all offers to sell it to another commercial owner, not wanting to chance on the new owner making KMOS a full-power ABC affiliate. The area did not have a full-time ABC affiliate until Columbia's KCBJ-TV (now KMIZ) signed-on in 1971.

In 1978, Kansas City Southern Industries donated KMOS to Central Missouri State University (now the University of Central Missouri), who converted the station into a stand-alone PBS station; some local interests had expressed dismay at the loss of Sedalia's commercial television station. Previously, Columbia/Jefferson City had been one of the few areas of Missouri without its own PBS member station. Most cable systems in the market piped in KETC, while the western part of the market could also get a grade B signal from KCPT. Central took control of KMOS on August 15, 1978, and took it off the air for 16 months to give it a significant technical overhaul. It returned to the air on December 22, 1979, from new studios in Warrensburg. After relinquishing KMOS, KRCG started a translator station in Sedalia, K11OJ.

The KMOS transmitter had an effective radiated power of 100 kW for its channel 6 analog frequency, but has 322 kW for its digital channel (corresponding to the bandwidth of channel 15), with similar height above average terrain for both transmitters (about 602 to 603 meters [1,975 to 1,978 ft] above sea level).

== Technical information ==
=== Subchannels ===
The station's digital signal is multiplexed:

Subchannels of KMOS-TV
Subchannel	Res.	Short name	Programming
6.1	1080i	KMOS-TV	PBS
6.2	480i	Create	Create
6.3	480i	Emerge	KMOS Emerge
6.4	480i	KIDS	PBS Kids

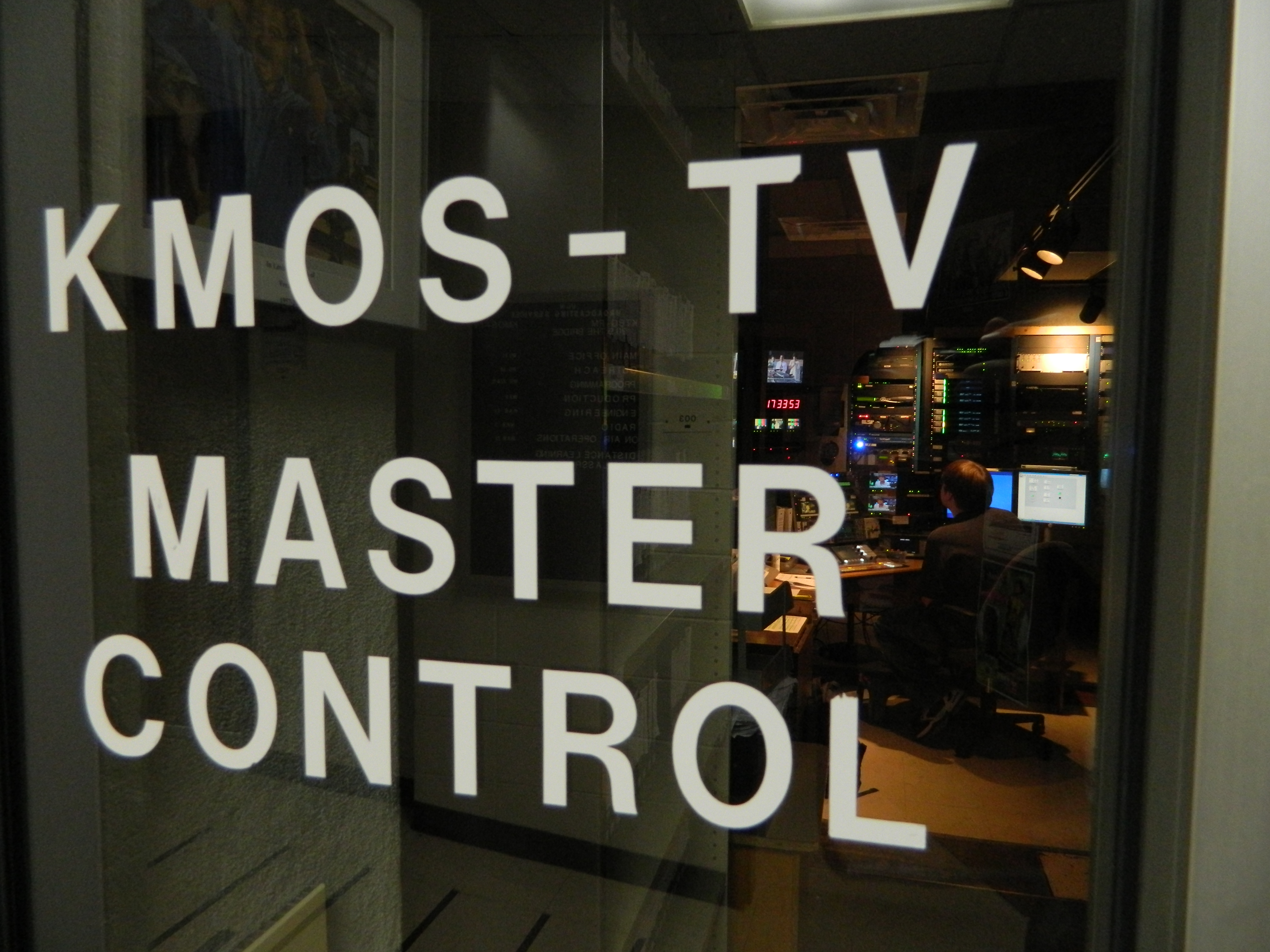

=== Analog-to-digital conversion ===
KMOS-TV shut down its analog signal, over VHF channel 6, on April 2, 2009. The station's digital signal remained on its pre-transition UHF channel 15, using virtual channel 6.

== Broadcast tower ==
In April 2003, opening ceremonies were conducted for the station's new digital broadcasting and transmitter facility in Syracuse, Missouri, located about 50 miles (80 km) from Warrensburg, and includes a 2,000-foot (610 m) guyed mast, the KMOS TV Tower (also called a Rohn tower). It was built 2001–2002 and was inaugurated on April 24, 2003. The tower is the tallest structure in Missouri and one of the tallest structures in the world—more than three times the height of the Gateway Arch. The tower is 0.2 metres (0.66 ft) higher than the previous record holder KYTV (TV) in Springfield, Missouri.

== See also ==
- KTBG (former radio sister station to KMOS)
