= CBS Columbia =

CBS Columbia may refer to:

- KRCG, the CBS television affiliate in Columbia, Missouri
- WLTX, the CBS television affiliate in Columbia, South Carolina

== See also ==
- Columbia Records, an American record label owned by CBS 1938–1988
