= KRBK =

Television station in Osage Beach, Missouri

- Osage Beach–Springfield, Missouri; United States
- City: Osage Beach, Missouri
- Channels: Digital: 22 (UHF); Virtual: 49
- Branding: Fox 49; Ozarks First News

Programming
- Affiliations: 49.1: Fox; for others, see § Subchannels

Ownership
- Owner: Nexstar Media Group; (Nexstar Media Inc.)
- Sister stations: KOZL-TV, KOLR

History
- Founded: September 22, 2006
- First air date: August 1, 2009
- Former channel numbers: Digital: 49 (UHF, 2009–2018)
- Former affiliations: MyNetworkTV (2009–2014; secondary from 2011)
- Call sign meaning: founding owner Robert B. Koplar

Technical information
- Licensing authority: FCC
- Facility ID: 166319
- ERP: 1,000 kW
- HAAT: 590 m (1,936 ft)
- Transmitter coordinates: 37°13′9.4″N 92°56′57.4″W

Links
- Public license information: Public file; LMS
- Website: www.ozarksfirst.com

KRBK (channel 49) is a television station licensed to Osage Beach, Missouri, United States, serving the Springfield area as an affiliate of the Fox network. It is owned by Nexstar Media Group alongside KOZL-TV (channel 27)—an independent station with MyNetworkTV—and is co-managed with CBS affiliate KOLR (channel 10). The three stations share studios on East Division Street in Springfield; KRBK's transmitter is located on Switchgrass Road, north of Fordland.

== History ==
=== Early history ===
The station first signed on the air on August 1, 2009, prior to signing on KRBK, Koplar Communications served as the founding owner of KPLR-TV in St. Louis—which it sold to ACME Communications in 1997 (it is now a sister station to KRBK)—and formerly owned KMAX-TV in Sacramento—which once bore the KRBK-TV call letters and which Koplar sold to Pappas Telecasting in 1994 (it is now owned by CBS News and Stations). It immediately became the MyNetworkTV affiliate for the Ozarks. At the time KRBK signed on, MyNetworkTV programming had not been available in the market for several months, after Harrison, Arkansas–based KWBM (channel 31) switched to Daystar upon being sold to the network as part of Equity Media Holdings's auction of its television stations. The station originally branded as "KRBK-HD".

KRBK's transmitter was originally plotted to be located halfway between Springfield and Jefferson City in northern Laclede County, giving it rimshot (Grade B) signals within Springfield and Jefferson City. This is possible because Osage Beach spills into both Camden and Miller counties, and is thus split between the two markets. Most of the city is in Camden County, part of the Springfield market. However, a small sliver in the north is in Miller County, part of the Columbia–Jefferson City market. The transmitter was later moved to Eldridge, in northeastern Laclede County, firmly in the Springfield market.

=== As a Fox affiliate ===
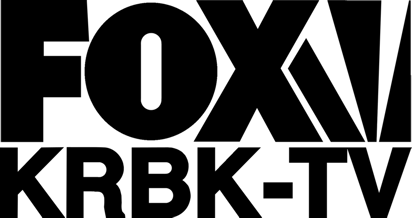
Former KRBK logo, used from September 1, 2011, to September 7, 2014.

Fox announced on June 20, 2011, that it would end its affiliation with KSFX-TV. That station's owner, Nexstar Broadcasting Group, had earlier lost the Fox affiliation for a station in Indiana following a dispute with the network over retransmission consent fees that had led contract renewal talks to drag on for more than a year. KRBK was announced as the replacement affiliate. and began broadcasting Fox programming on September 1.

In spite of becoming a Fox affiliate, KRBK's signal did not serve the entire market. Station management claimed that 82% of viewers could immediately watch KRBK through cable or satellite. At the time, KRBK was in the midst of installing a five-transmitter single frequency network to broadcast its signal throughout the market.

Former KRBK logo under the "Fox 5" branding, used from September 8, 2014, to October 21, 2018.

On September 8, 2014, MyNetworkTV programming moved from KRBK to KOZL. On that same date, KRBK rebranded as "Fox 5", in reference to its primary channel position in the market on Mediacom's Springfield-area system and on other local cable and satellite providers within the Springfield market; the rollout of the branding also included a logo based on that of the Fox owned-and-operated stations as well as the network's San Diego affiliate KSWB-TV (which also brands as "Fox 5", but uses its former UHF analog allocation of channel 69 as its virtual channel).

=== Sale to Nexstar Media Group ===
On August 2, 2018, Nexstar announced its intent to acquire KRBK from Koplar Communications for $16.45 million; the move marked Koplar's second retirement from television station ownership. Nexstar concurrently assumed the station's operations through a time brokerage agreement that took effect the day prior. The transaction resulted in the formation of a virtual triopoly with Nexstar-owned KOZL-TV—putting KRBK under common ownership with the station from which it assumed the Fox affiliation seven years earlier—and CBS affiliate KOLR (channel 10), which Nexstar manages through a local marketing agreement with Mission Broadcasting.

In October 2018, KRBK relocated its primary transmitter to the Fordland antenna farm, which provides over-the-air coverage comparable to the market's other full-power stations. Subsequently, on October 22, KRBK's operations were integrated into KOZL/KOLR's studio facilities on East Division Street (near the Webster Park/Shady Dell subdivision); the station also changed its branding to "Ozarks Fox", utilizing a logo similar in resemblance to that used since 2012 by Nexstar-operated/Mission-owned Fox affiliate KJTL in Wichita Falls, Texas. The sale was finalized on November 1. The arrangement—including the preceding time brokerage agreement—placed KRBK in the unusual position of being the senior partner as a Fox-affiliated station in a virtual triopoly involving a CBS affiliate (in most virtual or legal operational arrangements involving a Fox affiliate and a Big Three-affiliated station, the Fox station normally serves as the junior partner).

== News operation ==
As of October 2018, KRBK presently broadcasts 17 1/2 hours of locally produced newscasts each week (with 3 1/2 hours each weekday); the station does not presently produce newscasts on Saturdays and Sundays, opting to carry syndicated programming following Fox prime time programming on those days.

From 2010 to 2012, KRBK aired wraparound segments throughout its broadcast day featuring the "KRBK Street Team", who provided entertainment, sports and event-related stories. KRBK began offering conventional news programming in November 2012, consisting mainly of 90-second newsbriefs (originally titled the Fox KRBK News Break) that aired weeknights each hour between 5 and 10 p.m. during select commercial breaks within daytime and evening programs, featuring Associated Press wire reports and a short local weather forecast.

Full-scale newscasts on the station began in September 2013, with the launch of a full in-house news department; that month, KRBK debuted Fox KRBK News at 9:00, an abbreviated prime time newscast that began as a 10-minute broadcast leading into the tape-delayed MyNetworkTV prime time lineup. (As a result, the programming service's local ad time was largely taken up by the newscast.) The program—which has aired only on Monday through Friday nights since its premiere—directly competes against a half-hour prime time newscast in that timeslot produced by KOLR for its MyNetworkTV-affiliated sister KOZL-TV (which debuted in 2005, during that station's tenure as the Springfield market's original Fox affiliate, as the area's first local prime time news program), and an hour-long newscast produced by NBC affiliate KYTV (channel 3) for its CW-affiliated sister K15CZ (now primary ABC affiliate KSPR-LD, which continues to carry CW programming on its second subchannel) that premiered on August 22, 2011. The newscast was initially anchored by Janelle Brandom, alongside chief meteorologist David Koeller.

In September 2015, the station expanded the 9 p.m. newscast—which, by then, had been retitled Fox 5 News at Nine—to a half-hour, an expansion which coincided with the transfer of the MyNetworkTV affiliation to KOZL-TV. Subsequently, in 2016, the 9 p.m. newscast was expanded to one hour, with the addition of a companion half-hour program at 9:30 p.m., Fox 5 News Edge at 9:30; the program—which is similar to the format of former Fox affiliate WCCB/Charlotte's weeknightly WCCB News Edge—maintains a mix of traditional news, entertainment and lifestyle segments. The station began programming regular newscasts outside its established 9 p.m. slot in March 2018, when KRBK premiered a half-hour 6:30 p.m. newscast on Monday through Friday evenings.

On October 22, 2018, KRBK rebranded its news operation as Ozarks Fox News. At the same time, the station debuted a two-hour weekday morning hybrid newscast/lifestyle talk show titled Ozarks Fox AM, airing from 7 to 9 a.m. and hosted by Jeremy Rabe and Kelly Smith. The station also began simulcasting the 6 a.m. hour of KOLR 10 News Daybreak and relaunched its 6:30 p.m. newscast as Ozarks Tonight. With the rebranded newscasts, KRBK began broadcasting its newscasts from KOLR's studios on East Division Street in Springfield.

== In other media ==
The 2014 20th Century Fox film Gone Girl features KRBK's pre-September 2014 logo within the film's preview poster, various key art and other online presences with news stories around the events depicted in the film (whose setting takes place in KRBK's market area), along with a false search coordination website with the same logo. No real staff members were used, and in the actual film, the fictional KRBK news organization seems to have a glossy tabloid image unlike what is seen in reality.

== Technical information ==
=== Subchannels ===
The station's signal is multiplexed:

Subchannels of KRBK
Subchannel	Res.	Short name	Programming
49.1	720p	KRBK-HD	Fox
49.2	480i	Antenna	Antenna TV
49.3	480i	Charge!	Charge!
49.4	480i	IonTV	Ion
27.1	720p	KOZL-HD	KOZL-TV (Independent with MyNetworkTV)

Broadcast on behalf of another station

On January 1, 2014, KRBK launched a second digital subchannel carrying MeTV. On March 1, 2017, Ion Television was added to KRBK's 49.4 subchannel. On January 1, 2021, KRBK replaced its MeTV subchannel with Nexstar-owned network Antenna TV, with MeTV moving to KSPR-LD subchannel 33.3 which previously carried Antenna TV.

=== Former DTS transmitters ===
In April 2013, KRBK improved its signal coverage in this vast and mostly mountainous market through the implementation of a distributed single-frequency network, consisting of five specially engineered slot antennas positioned throughout the Ozarks. All of the repeaters broadcast high definition digital signals on UHF channel 49. Due to the single-frequency system, the station was unavailable over-the-air in Salem (located in the northeast part of the market), and was only available on cable television in that town.

Since the main KRBK signal missed Springfield itself, Koplar leased two subchannels of KWBM from its owner, Daystar, in order to provide a full-power signal of their Fox and MeTV channels to the southern portion of the market. This arrangement ended in 2020 with the launch of the Daystar Español channel on KWBM-DT2.

City	HAAT	ERP	Coordinates	Location
Eldridge	100 m (328 ft)	92.3 kW	37°49′10″N 92°44′52″W	Northwest of Lebanon, just south of Eldridge
Polk	122 m (400 ft)	42.9 kW	37°43′26″N 93°16′32″W	Southwest of Pomme de Terre Lake
Springfield	191.8 m (629 ft)	170.9 kW	37°13′24.63″N 93°14′29.83″W	the KOLR studio-transmitter link tower behind the KOLR/KOZL-TV studios on Springfield's northeast side, near Downtown Airport
Stockton	104.4 m (343 ft)	88.8 kW	37°45′17.4″N 93°50′7.2″W	North of Stockton
Warsaw	119.1 m (391 ft)	43.7 kW	38°14′17.3″N 93°19′6.23″W	West of Warsaw, near the Truman Reservoir

== See also ==
- Channel 5 branded TV stations in the United States
- Channel 22 digital TV stations in the United States
- Channel 49 virtual TV stations in the United States
