= KPXE-TV =

Television station in Kansas City, Missouri

- Kansas City, Missouri; United States
- Channels: Digital: 30 (UHF); Virtual: 50

Programming
- Affiliations: 50.1: Ion Television; for others, see § Subchannels

Ownership
- Owner: Inyo Broadcast Holdings (sale to the E. W. Scripps Company pending); (Inyo Broadcast Licenses LLC)

History
- First air date: December 15, 1978
- Former call signs: KYFC (1978–1997); KINB (1997–1998)
- Former channel numbers: Analog: 50 (UHF, 1978–2009); Digital: 51 (UHF, 2004–2015)
- Former affiliations: Religious independent (1978–1997); Infomall TV (1997–1998)
- Call sign meaning: Contains "PX" for former owner Paxson Communications Corporation

Technical information
- Licensing authority: FCC
- Facility ID: 33337
- ERP: 1,000 kW
- HAAT: 339 m (1,112 ft)
- Transmitter coordinates: 39°1′19.9″N 94°30′49.7″W

Links
- Public license information: Public file; LMS
- Website: iontelevision.com

KPXE-TV (channel 50) is a television station in Kansas City, Missouri, United States, affiliated with Ion Television. Owned by Inyo Broadcast Holdings, the station broadcasts from a transmitter located in the city's Brown Estates section.

Channel 50, initially occupied by KCIT-TV from 1969 to 1971, returned to use on December 15, 1978, as KYFC. It was owned by Kansas City Youth for Christ and broadcast Christian religious programs. Amid a downturn in donations and the eventuality of a costly mandate to convert to digital broadcasting, the organization sold the station to Paxson Communications Corporation, forerunner to Ion Media, in 1997. The station was known as KINB and broadcast infomercials for more than a year until the Pax network, predecessor to Ion, began on August 31, 1998. Ion Media was acquired by the E. W. Scripps Company in 2020, with KPXE and other stations divested to Inyo in markets where Scripps already owned too many stations.

== Prior channel 50 ==
Channel 50 was first used by KCIT-TV, which began broadcasting on October 29, 1969. The first new station to sign on in town in a decade, channel 50 filled an immediate void as the market's only independent station. Allied Broadcasting, owned by 20 local stockholders, could not survive a downturn in the economy and competition from a new independent station that signed on a year later, KBMA-TV (channel 41, now NBC affiliate KSHB-TV). KBMA-TV had wealthier owners and a stronger signal than channel 50. KCIT-TV cut programming hours in June, only to go silent July 8, 1971, after several days of bare minimum programming. Ottman blamed the bad economy for the station's demise. The station's technical facilities were acquired for use in relaunching KCPT (channel 19) with color capability.

== History ==
=== KYFC: Kansas City Youth for Christ ===
Kansas City Youth for Christ, Inc., filed with the Federal Communications Commission (FCC) for a construction permit to use channel 50. The ministry, operating since 1943 and run by Al Metsker, planned to program an all-Christian format from its facilities in the Westwood area. The FCC granted the permit on April 29, 1977, and construction was underway by July 1978. For Kansas City Youth for Christ, not only would the station fill a void in Christian programming in the market, but general manager David Lewis highlighted that it was a "natural extension" of the organization's purpose: "Teenagers watch an awful lot of TV." KYFC debuted with an inaugural telecast on December 15, 1978. Within two years, with viewer support, Kansas City Youth for Christ had retired its entire $2.6 million mortgage. The station was honored by the National Religious Broadcasters as its 1992 TV station of the year. In addition to religious programs, KYFC aired some sports events, but because it did not accept beer commercials, this was limited. In late 1996, KYFC became the television rights broadcaster of the Kansas City Wiz soccer team, replacing coverage on public-access cable channels.

After nearly two decades of providing religious programming, viewer support had dipped by the mid-1990s, and KYFC was running annual deficits of $350,000. Ronnie Metsker, Al's son, attributed the decline in donations to the fallout from the 1987 PTL scandal, and with an expensive mandate to convert television stations to digital broadcasting, Kansas City Youth for Christ feared that KYFC would be a drain on its resources. Metsker estimated the cost of conversion at $5 million and told donors that it would require the organization to focus primarily on television and not ministering to youth. The organization sought a buyer that would, per Metsker, "air programs that would not conflict with our traditional Christian-Judeo family values". A group headed by KSMO-TV general manager Jim McDonald made an offer, but McDonald's group was unable to obtain broadcast rights to Kansas City Royals baseball, which would have been the centerpiece of channel 50's new programming.

=== Paxson and Ion ownership ===
In January 1997, Kansas City Youth for Christ announced the sale of KYFC to Paxson Communications Corporation of West Palm Beach, Florida, for $16.4 million. Company owner Lowell Paxson, a born-again Christian, was an ideal fit for the organization's needs, just as he was acquiring stations nationwide for his Infomall TV (inTV) service, which aired infomercials and religious programs. The KYFC production facilities were retained by Kansas City Youth for Christ.

Paxson assumed control on April 25, 1997, and the station joined inTV under a new KINB call sign. Shortly after, Lowell Paxson announced plans to convert the inTV stations to a new national family-oriented entertainment network, known at the time as Paxnet. In January 1998, all the stations took call signs containing the letters PX, with KINB changing to KPXE-TV. Pax launched on August 31, 1998, with KPXE as its Kansas City station. Under a multi-market deal signed in 2001, the E. W. Scripps Company, owner of KSHB-TV and KMCI-TV in the Kansas City market, provided advertising sales services and local news rebroadcasts to KPXE-TV and Pax stations in West Palm Beach, Florida, and Tulsa, Oklahoma.

After changing its name to i: Independent Television in 2005, the same year that Paxson terminated all joint sales agreements with other stations, the network became known as Ion Television in 2007, following the 2006 name change of Paxson Communications Corporation to Ion Media Networks.

On September 24, 2020, Scripps announced that it would purchase Ion Media for $2.65 billion. With this purchase, Scripps divested 23 Ion-owned stations to Inyo Broadcast Holdings, including KPXE-TV, as Scripps already owned two stations in the Kansas City market. The divestitures allowed the merged company to fully comply with FCC local and national ownership regulations. Inyo agreed to maintain Ion affiliations for the divested stations.

Scripps announced its repurchase of all Inyo stations on February 26, 2026.

== Technical information ==
=== Subchannels ===
KPXE-TV's transmitter is located transmitter is located in the Brown Estates section of Kansas City, Missouri. The station's signal is multiplexed:

Subchannels of KPXE-TV
Subchannel	Res.	Short name	Programming
50.1	720p	ION	Ion Television
50.2	480i	Mystery	Ion Mystery
50.3	480i	IONPlus	Ion Plus
50.4	480i	BUSTED	Busted
50.5	480i	GameSho	Game Show Central
50.6	480i	QVC2	QVC2
50.7	480i	QVC	QVC
50.8	480i	HSN2	HSN2

=== Analog-to-digital conversion ===
KPXE-TV began broadcasting a digital signal on channel 51 on April 5, 2004. It shut down its analog signal, over UHF channel 50, on June 12, 2009, the official digital transition date under federal mandate. The station's digital signal continued to broadcasts on its pre-transition UHF channel 51, using virtual channel 50.

As the result of wireless operations in spectrum adjacent to channel 51, Ion Media successfully petitioned the FCC to reallocate KPXE-TV to channel 30 in 2014.
