= KOZL-TV =

Television station in Springfield, Missouri

ATSC 3.0 station
- Springfield, Missouri; United States
- Channels: Digital: 28 (UHF); Virtual: 27
- Branding: Z27; Ozarks First News on Z

Programming
- Affiliations: 27.1: Independent with MyNetworkTV; for others, see § Subchannels

Ownership
- Owner: Nexstar Media Group; (Nexstar Media Inc.)
- Sister stations: KOLR, KRBK

History
- First air date: September 29, 1968
- Former call signs: KMTC (1968–1985); KDEB-TV (1985–2005); KSFX-TV (2005–2011)
- Former channel numbers: Analog: 27 (UHF, 1968–2009)
- Former affiliations: ABC (1968–1986); Independent (1986–1987, 2011–2014); Fox (1987–2011)
- Call sign meaning: "Ozarks Local"

Technical information
- Licensing authority: FCC
- Facility ID: 3659
- ERP: 1,000 kW
- HAAT: 493 m (1,617 ft)
- Transmitter coordinates: 37°13′9.4″N 92°56′57.4″W

Links
- Public license information: Public file; LMS
- Website: www.ozarksfirst.com

KOZL-TV (channel 27) is a television station in Springfield, Missouri, United States. It is programmed primarily as an independent station, but maintains a secondary affiliation with MyNetworkTV. KOZL-TV is owned by Nexstar Media Group alongside Fox affiliate KRBK (channel 49) and is co-managed with CBS affiliate KOLR (channel 10). The three stations share studios on East Division Street in Springfield; KOZL-TV's transmitter is located on Switchgrass Road, north of Fordland.

The Midland Television Corporation, a group of Springfield businessmen led by Ken Meyer, built the station as KMTC in 1968. It was Springfield's ABC affiliate but languished in local news ratings, trailing the established KOLR and KYTV. In 1985, Charles Woods bought the station and renamed it KDEB-TV after his daughter Deborah, who became station manager. When Woods bought the station, it was in the middle of a fight for its affiliation with the recently built KSPR (channel 33), which successfully obtained the ABC affiliation in 1986. Woods contested the action and sued ABC; he obtained a favorable jury verdict, but a federal judge overturned it. KDEB instead became a Fox affiliate in 1987 and became more competitive with improved network programming.

The station was sold three times in the 1990s; the third owner, Quorum Broadcasting, entered into the first version of a local marketing agreement with KOLR in 1999. Under common operation with KOLR, KDEB introduced a 9 p.m. local newscast, and KOLR helped KDEB recover from the November 2001 collapse of its tower, which left it at reduced power for nearly two months. Nexstar acquired KDEB-TV in 2003; the station changed call signs to KSFX-TV in 2005. When Nexstar and Fox disputed over terms of their affiliation agreement in 2011, Fox moved its affiliation to KRBK, and channel 27 became an independent station as KOZL-TV.

== History ==
=== KMTC: ABC for Springfield ===
In March 1966, Midland Television Corporation filed with the Federal Communications Commission (FCC) to build a third commercial TV station in Springfield, Missouri. Its owners were primarily from Springfield, led by Kenneth Meyer and Thomas Barneby, part-owners of local radio station KTXR (101.3 FM). The construction permit was granted on November 17, 1966, but construction of studios on Cherry Street did not begin until July 1968. A 1,621-foot (494 m) tower and transmitter facility were built near Fordland.

KMTC began broadcasting on September 29, 1968, as an ABC affiliate. Previously, ABC had been relegated to limited clearances on CBS affiliate KTTS-TV (channel 10, now KOLR) and NBC affiliate KYTV. Meyer initially thought KMTC had a chance to get a footing in the market with ABC's schedule, especially sports. He was also encouraged by an Arbitron survey that showed Springfield had 35 percent UHF-capable set penetration in an area with only VHF stations.

However, KMTC remained third in overall market ratings even after ABC rose to become the country's highest-rated network. This was because KMTC's footprint was not as large as those of its VHF competitors. KMTC only covered 51 percent of the market's households, while its VHF competitors reached 90 percent or more of regional homes. However, the station performed better in Springfield's inner ring than in the wider market. In 1977, KMTC managed to win several time slots in Greene and Christian counties during prime time. For instance, The Six Million Dollar Man finished a close third in its time slot in the market as a whole, but won the time slot by a nearly 2-to-1 margin in Springfield's inner ring. Meyer later remarked that even when viewers had sets with the capability to receive UHF stations, their UHF tuners had never been used before his station arrived and did not work: "[I]f one out of six people could get us we were lucky." Similarly, KMTC's newscasts traditionally had audience shares far behind its competitors. In November 1976, KMTC's newscasts had an 8 percent share at 10 p.m., trailing KOLR's 24 percent share and KYTV's 56 percent. Meyer filed to acquire controlling interest in KMTC in 1977.

Even after cable arrived in the market in 1979, KMTC's news ratings showed little improvement. In the early 1980s, channel 27's news ratings were so low that Springfield's new independent station, KSPR (channel 33)—which began in March 1983—attracted double the share commanded by KMTC in the May 1985 sweeps period at 10 p.m.

=== Charles Woods ownership and loss of ABC affiliation ===
In February 1985, Meyer agreed to sell KMTC to Charles Woods, who owned three other TV stations, for $21 million. Woods assumed control in June and named Deborah Corbett, his daughter, station manager. Woods expressed hope that by enlarging the staff to a level similar to his other stations, channel 27 could improve its news ratings. After taking ownership, Woods filed to the FCC for the call sign KDEB-TV, in honor of Corbett. The station instituted its first-ever weekend late evening newscasts in February 1986.

The deal included the affiliation contract with ABC, a three-year pact that expired July 3, 1986. Woods told the media at a news conference when he assumed control, "They should send us the normal notice a few months ahead of time. Cancellation of a network affiliation is almost unheard of." However, ABC was also entertaining a proposal from KSPR for the affiliation and invited KDEB to pitch the network on why it should not change stations. On April 3, 1986, ABC announced it was switching its affiliation in Springfield to KSPR by the end of the year. The news stunned Corbett and former owner Ken Meyer. ABC senior vice president of affiliate relations George Newi commented, "[W]e feel strongly that the resources and management that [KSPR owner] Lorimar-Telepictures has brought to KSPR will be more beneficial to the long-term growth and success of the ABC Television Network." As a result of losing the network affiliation, KDEB disbanded its news department on July 25. After ABC announced the switch, KDEB dropped some of ABC's lower-rated programs, which KSPR began airing. The remainder of ABC's schedule moved from KDEB to KSPR on October 5.

In response, Woods sued Lorimar-Telepictures seeking $109 million in damages, claiming that KSPR had overrepresented its improvements and financial capacity to the network while misrepresenting KSPR's finances and management, and sued Capital Cities/ABC for the same amount, claiming that ABC had represented its decision would be based on improvements in ratings and facilities, not the financial wherewithal of ownership. The Capital Cities/ABC case proceeded to a jury trial in 1988. The jury granted Woods $3.5 million in damages—far less than the firm had been seeking. A month later, federal judge Russell Gentry Clark overturned the verdict, finding that the jury had erred in its decision and that the evidence so strongly favored ABC that the judgment should favor it.

=== Fox affiliation ===
By March 1987, KDEB had joined the Fox network. As the network established itself in the early 1990s with shows such as The Simpsons, KDEB experienced ratings increases, particularly among viewers aged 18 to 49. Companies owned by Woods sold KDEB and three other stations to Banam Broadcasting, a subsidiary of Bank of America, in 1992 in exchange for debt reduction. At the time, Woods was in substantial financial distress. A bankruptcy filing for Woods Communications Corporation showed that assets of $16 million were exceeded by liabilities of $76 million, more than half of which was owed to Bank of America. Banam sold its stations in 1995 to Petracom Inc. of Tampa, Florida.

On February 18, 1999, Quorum Broadcasting entered into a joint sales and shared services agreement with KOLR, owned by VHR Broadcasting, to pool personnel, advertising sales, production, promotions, and operations. KDEB moved into the KOLR studios on Division Street and gained the resources necessary to start airing a 9 p.m. local newscast. Coming into the agreement, KOLR was recognized as stronger in programming and KDEB in sales.

KDEB's tower at Fordland collapsed on November 30, 2001, in the wake of an ice storm. The collapse came two months before Fox was to telecast Super Bowl XXXVI, which became a priority deadline for the station to restore as much service as possible. Cable subscribers in Springfield continued to receive a feed of KDEB, but subscribers to cable companies in other areas or satellite television were left without its signal. A temporary transmitter on KOLR's tower was used to broadcast the station at low power. In January 2002, a new permanent antenna was mounted on KOLR's tower. On January 26, the station resumed full-power telecasting, ahead of schedule and in time for the NFC Championship Game.

In 2003, VHR Broadcasting sold KOLR to Mission Broadcasting; at the same time, Nexstar Broadcasting Group acquired KDEB. KDEB-TV changed its call sign to KSFX-TV on January 18, 2005, when it began branding as "Ozarks Fox". The station began digital-only telecasting alongside KOLR in April 2009.

=== As an independent station ===
Final logo as KSFX, used from May to August 31, 2011

Fox announced on June 20, 2011, that it would end its affiliation with KSFX-TV and sister station WFFT-TV in Fort Wayne, Indiana. Nexstar had earlier lost the Fox affiliation for WTVW in Evansville, Indiana, following a dispute with the network over retransmission consent fees that had led contract renewal talks to drag on for more than a year. Replacing KSFX-TV as the Fox affiliate in the Springfield market was KRBK (channel 49), a recently established station licensed to Osage Beach, when the switch took effect on September 1.

KOZL logo used from September 1, 2011, to September 10, 2012

Without Fox programming, channel 27 became an independent station under a new call sign of KOZL-TV, branding as "Ozarks Local". Nexstar doubled the renamed station's local programming from 12 to 24 hours a week. The station's existing morning newscast, The Morning Rush, was expanded to two hours, and the station debuted a 4 p.m. lifestyle show, Ozarks Local Live at 4; a Sunday 6 p.m. newscast; and Saturday and Sunday evening sports shows. Nexstar acquired KRBK in 2018. The station also introduced programming blocks themed around the outdoors and bluegrass music, including a series on bow hunting, Full Draw Madness.

== Technical information and subchannels ==
KOZL-TV's transmitter is located on Switchgrass Road, north of Fordland. In December 2021, KOZL-TV became Springfield's ATSC 3.0 (NextGen TV) station. The station's ATSC 1.0 channels are carried on the multiplexed digital signals of sister stations KOLR and KRBK, and it airs its main channel and those of KOLR, KRBK, KYTV, and KSPR-LD as subchannels in 3.0 format:

Subchannels provided by KOZL-TV (ATSC 1.0)
Subchannel	Res.	Short name	Programming	ATSC 1.0 host
27.1	720p	KOZL-HD	Main KOZL-TV programming	KRBK
27.2	480i	Mystery	Ion Mystery	KOLR
27.3	480i	Bounce	Bounce TV	KOLR
27.4	480i	Oxygen	Oxygen	KOLR

Subchannels of KOZL-TV (ATSC 3.0)
Subchannel	Res.	Short name	Programming
3.1	1080p	KYTV	NBC (KYTV)
10.1	1080p	KOLR-10	CBS (KOLR)
27.1	1080p	KOZL-HD	Main KOZL-TV programming
33.1	1080p	KSPR-LD	ABC (KSPR-LD)
49.1	1080p	KRBK-HD	Fox (KRBK)

Subchannel broadcast with digital rights management
