= KGHZ =

Television station in Springfield, Missouri (1983–2017)

- Springfield, Missouri; United States
- Channels: Digital: 19 (UHF); Virtual: 15

Ownership
- Owner: Schurz Communications, Inc.
- Operator: Gray Television
- Sister stations: KYTV, KSPR-LD

History
- First air date: March 9, 1983
- Last air date: May 31, 2017
- Former call signs: KSPR (1983–2017)
- Former channel numbers: Analog: 33 (UHF, 1983–2009); Virtual: 33 (until 2017)
- Former affiliations: Independent (1983–1986); ABC (1986–February 2017); Antenna TV (February–May 2017)
- Call sign meaning: Abbreviation for gigahertz in reference to spectrum auction sale resulting in the license's demise

Technical information
- Licensing authority: FCC
- Facility ID: 35630
- ERP: 1,000 kW
- HAAT: 575 m (1,886 ft)
- Transmitter coordinates: 37°10′26″N 92°56′28.1″W

Links
- Public license information: Public file; LMS

KGHZ (channel 33) was a television station in Springfield, Missouri, United States. Owned by Schurz Communications, the station was operated by Gray Television for its last four months on the air before its license was returned to the Federal Communications Commission (FCC) on May 31, 2017, as a result of the FCC's 2016 spectrum auction. KGHZ's transmitter was located on Switchgrass Road, north of Fordland. For most of its history, it served as the Springfield–Branson market's ABC affiliate, a role now served by KSPR-LD.

== History ==
The station first signed on the air on March 9, 1983, as KSPR; it was the first independent station in the Springfield market. KSPR was founded by Springfield TV Association Ltd. The station originally operated from studio facilities located on South Glenstone Avenue in eastern Springfield. The following year, it sold channel 33 to the broadcasting unit of television production company Telepictures (later renamed Lorimar-Telepictures); the sale was approved by the FCC on December 12, 1984. The following February, Telepictures pursued an affiliation with ABC. On April 3, 1986, ABC decided to terminate its affiliation with KDEB-TV (channel 27, now KOZL-TV) and the network subsequently moved to KSPR. It was at this time KSPR moved to a new facility on Saint Louis Street.

Over the next several years, KSPR underwent several ownership changes. Lorimar-Telepictures sold the station to Goltrin Communications in 1987; the sale was approved by the FCC on February 12, 1988. Goltrin subsequently sold KSPR to Davis Goldfarb Communications several months later, with the sale being finalized on December 1, 1988. Cottonwood Communications acquired the station on March 29, 1995. Two years later, KSPR was sold to GOCOM Communications; which assumed ownership of the station on September 18, 1997. The station changed its branding to "ABC 33" around this time, before adopting the "Springfield 33" brand in 1998. GOCOM then merged with Grapevine Communications to form GOCOM Holdings LLC, which was later renamed Piedmont Television Holdings, on November 1, 1999.

On September 21, 2006, Piedmont Television announced that it would sell KSPR to Perkin Media, LLC. Under the agreement, South Bend, Indiana–based Schurz Communications, owners of NBC affiliate KYTV (channel 3), would take over KSPR's operations under a shared services agreement (SSA); the FCC approved the sale on August 18, 2007, and the purchase was finalized on August 28, 2007. Two weeks later on September 9, the station changed its on-air branding to "KSPR ABC"; a gray and black "33" was added to the logo first introduced with the rebrand in November 2009. On November 1, 2009, KSPR relocated its operations from its longtime studios on East Saint Louis Street into KYTV's facility on West Sunshine Street in an expanded wing of the building.

Final KSPR logo, used until 2017. It was retained by KSPR-LD.

KSPR began broadcasting digital-only on February 17, 2009.

Schurz announced on September 14, 2015, that it would exit broadcasting and sell its television and radio stations, including KYTV, K15CZ-D (channel 15), and the SSA with KSPR, to Gray Television for $442.5 million. Schurz subsequently agreed to exercise its option to purchase KSPR on December 15, 2015; the transfer, which was contingent on the completion of the sale of KYTV and the rest of its television division to Gray, called for the termination of KSPR's joint sales agreement with KYTV and for the KSPR license to be entered into the FCC's broadcast incentive auction. The FCC approved the sale on February 12, 2016, and it was completed on February 16, 2016.

On January 2, 2017, KYTV began to simulcast KSPR 33.1 programming on one of its own subchannels. On February 1, 2017, channel 33's call letters were changed to KGHZ (a likely reference to the spectrum auction); the KSPR call letters are now used by the former K15CZ-D, which changed its call letters from KYCW-LD to KSPR-LD on the same day. Shortly after the callsign change, KGHZ swapped its virtual channel 33 position and ABC affiliation with KSPR-LD, with KGHZ's primary virtual channel mapping to 15.1. Through all of this, the on-air day-to-day operations of KSPR went unchanged on their new signal outside of mentions for over-the-air viewers to rescan their sets in order to continue to watch ABC programming. However, few viewers actually lost access to ABC programming due to the high penetration of cable and satellite, which are all but essential for acceptable television in this vast and mountainous market.

As KGHZ, the station carried Antenna TV on its main subchannel until May 31, when the station went off the air and its license was returned to the FCC the same day. The channel 19 frequency is now occupied by low-power sister station KYCW-LD (formerly K25BD-D) in Branson on virtual channel 25. The KGHZ license was canceled on that date. However, KYCW-LD utilizes KSPR/KGHZ's former full-power transmitter and tower at KYCW-LD's reduced power requirements.

== Programming ==
As an ABC affiliate, KSPR carried the entire network schedule, with all programs airing in pattern.

=== Locally produced programming ===
On April 21, 1989, KSPR debuted The Late Night Horror Show with Count Norlock, a showcase of syndicated horror films that featured locally produced wraparound introductory and interstitial segments. Segments were hosted by local actor Jim Kellett in the role of "Count Norlock", a vampire reminiscent of Count Orlok from the 1922 F. W. Murnau film Nosferatu. Featuring films such as Magic and The Brides of Dracula, The Late Night Horror Show with Count Norlock only lasted one season, being cancelled later that year.

From 1985 to 1990, KSPR produced the local afternoon children's program Sammy's Place, which was hosted by actor Wayne Milnes in the role of hobo clown "Sammy B. Good". The program featured cartoons such as He-Man and the Masters of the Universe, She-Ra: Princess of Power, Voltron, Transformers and G.I. Joe. Between the programs, Sammy featured area children as in-studio guests and entertained with a number of clown acts and skits; he famously excited the in-studio kids with screams of "Everybody go 'yeaaaa'!", which would be echoed in unison.

=== Notable former on-air staff ===
- Mark Steines – anchor/reporter
