= QCR Holdings =

American banking company

QCR Holdings, Inc.
- Type: Public
- Traded as: Nasdaq: QCRH; Russell 2000 Component
- Industry: Finance
- Headquarters: Moline, Illinois, U.S.,
- Key people: Patrick S. Baird (chairman); Larry J. Helling (CEO)
- Products: Banks
- Revenue: US$312 million (2020)
- Operating income: US$23.63 million (2008)
- Net income: US$6.71 million (2008)
- Number of employees: 343

QCR Holdings, Inc., through its subsidiaries, provides commercial and consumer banking, and trust and asset management services for the Quad City and Cedar Rapids communities. QCR Holdings, Inc. was founded in 1993 and is headquartered in Moline, Illinois.

== About ==
QCR Holdings, Inc. is a multi-bank holding company headquartered in Moline, Illinois that serves the Quad Cities and Cedar Rapids communities through its wholly owned subsidiary banks. The company also engages in commercial leasing through a subsidiary company in Milwaukee, Wisconsin.:

== Subsidiary Banks ==
The subsidiary banks of QCR Holdings include:

- Quad City Bank and Trust - Based in Bettendorf, Iowa - Commenced operations in 1994
- Cedar Rapids Bank and Trust - Based in Cedar Rapids, Iowa - Commenced operations in 2001

QCR Holdings signed an agreement to sell its Milwaukee subsidiary, First Wisconsin Bank & Trust, to National Bancshares, Inc. near the end of 2008. First Wisconsin commenced operations in 2006.

QCR Holdings announced an agreement to sell its Rockford subsidiary, Rockford Bank and Trust, to Heartland Financial USA, Inc. subsidiary Illinois Bank & Trust on August 13, 2019. The sale closed on November 30, 2019 and the bank's systems conversion occurred on February 7, 2020.

In 2022, QCR Holdings acquired Guaranty Federal Bancshares.
