= KOLR =

Television station in Springfield, Missouri

- Springfield, Missouri; United States
- Channels: Digital: 10 (VHF); Virtual: 10
- Branding: KOLR 10 (pronounced as "Color 10"); Ozarks First News

Programming
- Affiliations: 10.1: CBS; for others, see § Subchannels

Ownership
- Owner: Mission Broadcasting, Inc.
- Operator: Nexstar Media Group
- Sister stations: KOZL-TV, KRBK

History
- First air date: March 15, 1953
- Former call signs: KTTS-TV (1953–1971); KOLR (1971–1976); KOLR-TV (1976–1985)
- Former channel numbers: Analog: 10 (VHF, 1953–2009); Digital: 52 (UHF, 1999–2009)
- Former affiliations: DuMont (1953–1955)
- Call sign meaning: Pronounced "color" as in color television

Technical information
- Licensing authority: FCC
- Facility ID: 28496
- ERP: 26 kW
- HAAT: 631 m (2,070 ft)
- Transmitter coordinates: 37°13′9.4″N 92°56′57.4″W

Links
- Public license information: Public file; LMS
- Website: www.ozarksfirst.com

KOLR (channel 10) is a television station in Springfield, Missouri, United States, affiliated with CBS. It is owned by Mission Broadcasting and operated by Nexstar Media Group alongside KRBK (channel 49), a Fox affiliate, and KOZL-TV (channel 27), an independent station with MyNetworkTV. The three stations share studios on East Division Street in Springfield; KOLR's transmitter is located on Switchgrass Road, north of Fordland.

KOLR is the third-oldest television station in Missouri and the oldest outside St. Louis and Kansas City. It began broadcasting on March 15, 1953, as KTTS-TV, the television extension of KTTS radio, and has been Springfield's CBS affiliate since its inception. The station changed its call sign from KTTS-TV to KOLR in 1971, in preparation for a sale of the radio portion of the business. Independent Broadcasting Company, the original and local owners, sold KOLR in 1999 to VHR Broadcasting, which entered into an agreement with channel 27 to combine facilities and sales staffs, among other resources. Nexstar became the operator in 2003 when it bought channel 27's owner, Quorum Broadcasting; simultaneously, Mission acquired KOLR. The station has long been a distant second-place finisher to KYTV in local news ratings in the market.

== History ==
=== Early years ===
On July 25, 1952, the Independent Broadcasting Company, owners of Springfield radio stations KTTS (1400 AM) and KTTS-FM 94.7, applied to the Federal Communications Commission (FCC) seeking permission to build a station on channel 10 in the city. Company president Jack Cooper submitted the application shortly after Springfield Television applied for channel 3. With no other applications to consider, the FCC granted a construction permit to Independent Broadcasting on October 9; ownership promised that KTTS-TV would be on air within six to eight months. The application was approved with such speed that The Spectator column in the Springfield News & Leader claimed KTTS was almost "caught with its video down", but plans quickly emerged. KTTS expanded its existing quarters in the Chamber of Commerce Building downtown, moving radio operations into the first floor while devoting the second floor to television. It signed affiliation agreements with CBS and the DuMont Television Network. The initial antenna setup was temporary, intended to be relocated to a higher tower at a later date.

Shortly after Independent Broadcasting won the permit for channel 10, Springfield Newspapers, headed by Lester Cox, won a permit for channel 3. This set off a pitched battle to bring television to southwest Missouri; according to local attorney Jon Hulston, both had hoped to start operations in time to air the 1952 World Series. KTTS-TV began broadcasting on March 15, 1953, as the third television station in Missouri after WDAF-TV in Kansas City and KSD-TV in St. Louis. While it missed its goal of airing the 1952 World Series, it was still able to sign on a week before Springfield Newspapers signed on channel 3 as KYTV. All of its programs were filmed network shows until March 29, when news editor Don Meier delivered the station's first local newscast. Shortly after going on the air, Independent Broadcasting announced it had purchased land on Division Street for a new building and 700-foot (210 m) tower to serve its television operation. In 1956, the new tower on the site was completed and activated, boosting the station's power to the high-VHF maximum of 316,000 watts. Plans for the new facility progressed after the Chamber of Commerce Building was sold to the Guaranty Savings and Loan Company, but work did not begin until May 1958, and the new studio was occupied in 1959.

=== Call sign change to KOLR ===
In 1971, Independent Broadcasting agreed to sell the KTTS radio stations, which retained rights to the call sign, to Springfield Great Empire Broadcasting, an affiliate of KFDI in Wichita, Kansas. It retained channel 10, which it renamed KOLR (for "color") on November 29, 1971. In 1972, the station applied to build a new, 2,000-foot (610 m) tower near Fordland. Station officials anticipated the new tower, which would be the tallest in the state and one of the tallest in the nation, would more than double KOLR's coverage, providing coverage as far east as Rolla and as far west as Joplin. The new mast went into service on October 10, 1973, adding 50,000 new viewers in portions of southwest Missouri and northwest Arkansas. However, it did little to improve KOLR's ratings in the market; in 1976, its newscasts had less than half as many viewers as their competition on long-dominant KYTV.

In 1993, KOLR beat KYTV head-to-head in the five-county Springfield metro area for the first time in 35 years. It led by three points at 6 p.m. in the Springfield metro and 15 points at 10 p.m. While KYTV still held a modest eight-point lead at 6 p.m. in the full 33-county designated market area, the two stations were tied at 10 p.m. A decade earlier, KOLR had attracted barely a third of KYTV's news viewership in all timeslots. The news made the front page of the Springfield News-Leader. Within three years, KYTV regained its customary commanding ratings lead at 6 p.m. and 10 p.m., though KOLR held a narrow lead at 5 p.m.

=== VHR and Mission ownership ===
The Cooper family, founding owners of KTTS radio in 1940 and majority owners of Independent Broadcasting, opted not to transfer the station to the next generation of their family because of the tax burden involved. In 1998, the Coopers agreed to sell to U.S. Broadcasting, one of four Midwestern companies that had sought to buy channel 10. U.S. Broadcasting changed its name to VHR Broadcasting; Victor Rumore became a member of the buying consortium, and the purchase price was reduced to $55.9 million. On February 18, 1999, the station assumed operational control for KDEB-TV (channel 27), then the area's Fox affiliate owned by Quorum Broadcasting, under paired joint sales and shared services agreements that united the two stations' sales, production, and promotion units in KOLR's studio building. Coming into the agreement, KOLR was recognized as stronger in programming and KDEB in sales. In 2003, VHR Broadcasting sold KOLR to Mission Broadcasting; at the same time, Nexstar Broadcasting Group acquired KDEB. KOLR has been digital-only since April 2009.

By 2009, KOLR and KYTV were much closer in total revenue. While KOLR attracted more viewers in prime time, it continued to heavily lag KYTV in ratings for its newscasts; its 10 p.m. newscast attracted barely half as many viewers as KYTV. The situation had not significantly changed by 2014, with KOLR's late newscast attracting only half the viewership of KYTV.

== Subchannels ==
The station's signal is multiplexed:

Subchannels of KOLR
Subchannel	Res.	Short name	Programming
10.1	1080i	KOLR-10	CBS
10.2	480i	Laff	Laff
10.3	480i	Grit	Grit
10.4	480i	DEFY	Defy
27.2	480i	Mystery	Ion Mystery (KOZL-TV)
27.3	480i	Bounce	Bounce TV (KOZL-TV)
27.4	480i	Oxygen	Oxygen (KOZL-TV)

Broadcast on behalf of another station
