= KCIT-TV (Kansas City) =

Television station in Kansas City, Missouri (1969–1971)

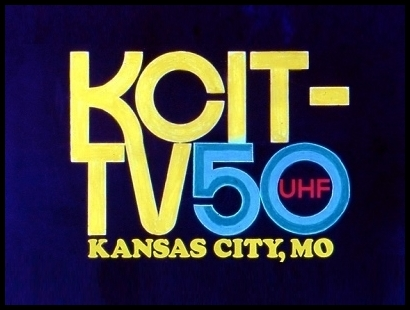
- Kansas City, Missouri; United States
- Channels: Analog: 50 (UHF)

Programming
- Affiliations: Independent

Ownership
- Owner: Allied Broadcasting, Inc.

History
- First air date: October 29, 1969
- Last air date: July 8, 1971

Technical information
- ERP: 740 kW
- HAAT: 354 m (1,160 ft)
- Transmitter coordinates: 39°04′57″N 94°28′46″W

KCIT-TV (channel 50) was an independent television station in Kansas City, Missouri, United States. It was the first new commercial television station to operate in Kansas City in nearly 15 years. It broadcast from October 29, 1969, to July 8, 1971, failing due to financial difficulties. After the station ceased broadcasting, the equipment was acquired by Community Service Broadcasting of Mid-America, which had also purchased public television station KCSD-TV (channel 19); KCIT-TV's equipment and KCSD-TV's license were used to relaunch public television in Kansas City as KCPT in 1972.

== History ==
On May 11, 1965, Allied Broadcasting, Inc., composed of 20 local businessmen led by James H. Ottman, filed for a construction permit to build a new television station in Kansas City, to operate on channel 25. The channel had been occupied by KCTY, a short-lived UHF outlet owned by the DuMont Television Network that lasted less than a year in 1953 and 1954. After Allied applied for a construction permit, however, the Federal Communications Commission (FCC) revised the UHF table of allocations twice in the span of a year. By the time Allied's application had been designated for hearing against a competing bid from Midway Broadcasting, it was for channel 36; when the FCC granted Allied the construction permit that April, it was for channel 50. The station remained unbuilt by late 1968.

KCIT-TV signed on October 29, 1969. The first new station to sign on in town in a decade, channel 50 filled an immediate void. Kansas City had not had a commercial independent since KCTY's demise, and by the end of the decade, it was the only major U.S. city to lack one. The station was able to clear a significant volume of network programs that the three affiliated stations in town did not, including one night of movies from each of the networks. It was also the first locally owned Kansas City station since WDAF-TV was sold in 1958. Local programming included a children's show hosted by Torey Southwick, formerly of KMBC-TV; a young Walt Bodine served as the station's news director.

As channel 50 was constructed, so too was a second UHF commercial station for Kansas City: KBMA-TV channel 41, which signed on in 1970. Prior to channel 50's going on air, the management of KBMA made two offers to KCIT stockholders to merge the two operations, one of which would have seen channel 41 donated to the University of Missouri; both were rebuffed by the stockholders. The two stations were even managed by twin brothers.

With a competitor, channel 50 suffered, particularly financially, and conditions came to a head in the summer of 1971. On June 23, the station cut back its broadcast day, signing on the air at 2:30 p.m. instead of 9 a.m., and replaced its general manager; owner Ottman declared, "KCIT-TV is here to stay". At the start of July, Allied sought permission to take KCIT-TV silent and immediately cut its schedule to the minimum two hours a day while it waited for its request to be processed. At 4:30 p.m. on July 8, the FCC approved Allied's request, and channel 50 signed off the air; that day, Jackson County sheriff's deputies served a writ of replevin on $495,000 worth of equipment the station had bought from RCA. Ottman blamed the bad economy for the station's demise. Allied Broadcasting would declare bankruptcy in September.

=== Facility reuse ===
The fate of the channel 50 facility was placed into immediate question, and a suitor appeared: Community Service Broadcasting of Mid-America, Inc. (CSB), which was in the process of negotiating to buy KCSD-TV (channel 19), the educational station owned by the Kansas City School District. The possibility of acquiring the KCIT physical plant would allow CSB to avoid needing to rent the facilities of KCSD-TV, which broadcast at lower power and was not equipped for color telecasting; however, the station would need to telecast educational programs on channel 19, because television sets in schools had been equipped with tuning strips that could not receive other UHF channels.

At a court-ordered auction on October 29, CSB purchased the KCIT facilities, except those owned by RCA, for $156,000, beating out a rival bid from Black radio station owner Andrew Carter, who wanted to start a minority-oriented television station. Ultimately, instead of operating both stations as once proposed, CSB chose to focus on improving channel 19. CSB renamed KCSD-TV KCPT on January 1, 1972. A new channel 19 transmitter and antenna, using the tower purchased from RCA, launched October 16, 1972.

=== Future use of channel 50 in Kansas City ===
Channel 50 would remain silent in Kansas City for another seven years after KCIT-TV's closure. In 1976, Kansas City Youth for Christ, Inc., applied to build a station on channel 50. KYFC-TV began broadcasting December 15, 1978.
