= KTBG =

Public radio station in Warrensburg–Kansas City, Missouri

- Warrensburg, Missouri; United States
- Broadcast area: Kansas City Metropolitan Area
- Frequency: 90.9 MHz
- Branding: The Bridge

Programming
- Format: Adult album alternative

Ownership
- Owner: Public Television 19, Inc.
- Sister stations: KCPT

History
- Former call signs: KCMW
- Call sign meaning: The Bridge

Technical information
- Licensing authority: FCC
- Class: C1
- ERP: 100,000 watts
- HAAT: 166.8 meters
- Transmitter coordinates: 38°57′30″N 94°06′44″W

Links
- Public license information: Public file; LMS
- Webcast: Listen live (via iHeartRadio)
- Website: bridge909.org

KTBG (90.9 FM, 90.9 The Bridge) is a listener-supported, non-commercial NPR Music member radio station serving the Kansas City, Missouri market, broadcast from Warrensburg, Missouri, United States. It is currently owned by Public Television 19, Inc., the holding company for the area's PBS member television station, Kansas City PBS (KCPT). Known as 90.9 The Bridge, it is Kansas City's NPR Music station, broadcast in an adult album alternative (AAA) format. The sale of KTBG to PT19 was announced in April 2013, and after FCC approval, the actual transfer occurred Tuesday, December 17, 2013 immediately after KTBG’s 7pm broadcast of All Things Considered.

The Bridge's music playlist is programmed by its staff, specializing in indie and alternative rock, along with highlighting local artists. Live, in-studio performances and interviews are regularly scheduled.

The Bridge's studios are located in the KCPT building. It is also broadcast worldwide via internet radio.

In 2021, The Bridge received the Missouri Broadcasters Association's Radio Station of the Year Award.

== History ==
KTBG signed on April 1, 1962 as KCMW under the ownership of the Central Missouri State College (now University of Central Missouri). In 1971 it began airing National Public Radio and jazz programming under the ownership of the University of Central Missouri. On August 19, 2001, the station adopted its current call letters and switched to the current format. The first song played after NPR's Morning Edition was "Some Bridges" by Jackson Browne.

For years, KCMW (now KTBG) operated from a 443-foot tower on the Johnson/Lafayette County line. As a result, even though it operated at 97,000 watts, it only provided secondary coverage of Kansas City itself and was marginal at best west of the Missouri River. This was likely necessary to protect the University of Kansas' KJHK at adjacent 90.7. For many years, KTBG was also heard on 104.9 K285ER, a low-power translator in Osage Beach, Missouri.

Over the years, KTBG has had competition in the AAA format from commercial stations in Kansas City: 97.3 KZPL (2003-2005), 99.7 KBLV (2008-2009), and 102.1 KCKC (2011-2014).

On April 18, 2013 the University of Central Missouri Board of Governors signed a letter of intent to transfer ownership of KTBG to Public Television 19, owner of KCPT. Kliff Kuehl, CEO and President of KCPT, indicated that while some changes would take place to KTBG once the transfer was approved by the FCC, the station would maintain its current music format.

After the transfer, the KTBG broadcast studios were moved to the KCPT building in Kansas City, and KTBG's transmitter was moved to a new tower 20 miles closer to Kansas City. Although still relatively short, at 547 feet, it still improved reception in the Kansas City metro. The reported sale price for the station was $1.1 million cash, plus an additional $550,000 in "in kind" services.

KTBG is the official radio station of the Kansas City Current professional soccer team, broadcasting all of their games.

Following the demise of Kansas City's commercial alternative stations 96.5 KRBZ and 105.1 KCJK, the stations ratings have increased.

In 2025, KTBG was named a finalist for the National Association of Broadcasters Crystal Radio Awards for outstanding community service.

== Format ==
The Bridge specializes in indie and alternative rock, but has long featured lesser-known independent artists across genres and cities of origin. KTBG airs a number of weekly specialty programs dedicated to music discovery from hip hop, electronic, indie, classic rock, pop, soul and local scenes. NPR Music shows World Cafe, Alt.Latino, and All Songs Considered also air on the station.

909 Sessions are filmed at KCPT/The Bridge's studios, and include interviews and performances from artists like Jason Isbell & the 400 Unit, Kacey Musgraves, Lake Street Dive, Yola, Ladysmith Black Mambazo, and Father John Misty. Notable Kansas City artists including Radkey, Madisen Ward & the Mama Bear, Frogpond and The Rainmakers have also appeared in studio.

For a long time, KTBG also aired Morning Edition, Weekend Edition and All Things Considered because the area's NPR News station, KCUR, only provides rimshot coverage of the eastern portion of the market. Many of the Kansas City stations must conform their signals to protect Whiteman Air Force Base in Knob Noster, near Warrensburg. Unusual for an NPR station, it formerly aired football and basketball games of the University of Central Missouri Mules.

In 2021, the station began airing "Sonic Spectrum with Robert Moore," which previously aired on KRBZ from 2007-2020 and on NPR-affiliate KCUR from 2003-2007.
