= Guaranty Federal Bancshares =

American community bank

Guaranty Bank
- Company type: Public
- Traded as: Nasdaq: GFED
- Industry: Banking, Financial services
- Founded: 1913
- Defunct: 2022
- Fate: Acquired by QCR Holdings and merged into Springfield First Community Bank
- Headquarters: Springfield, Missouri, United States
- Key people: Shaun Burke (CEO)
- Net income: ▲US$ 5.429 million (2017)
- Total assets: ▲US$ 800,403,000 (2018)
- Website: www.gbankmo.com

Guaranty Bank was a community bank established in 1913. The bank operated beneath its holding company, Guaranty Federal Bancshares, Inc. The bank invests deposits attracted from the general public. It is headquartered in Springfield, Mo. and operated branches in Greene, Christian and Jasper counties as well as a loan production office in Webster County.

== History ==
In 1913, St. Louis Saving and Building Association moved to Springfield and changed its name to Guaranty Savings and Loan Association.

In 1935, the name was changed again to Guaranty Federal Savings and Loan Association.

In 1979, the company’s first banking center was founded.

In 1995, Guaranty Federal Savings Bank was formed in the reorganization of Guaranty Federal Savings & Loan Association.

In 2001, the company began offering online banking.

In 2003, the company changed its name from Guaranty Federal Savings Bank to Guaranty Bank.

In 2022, the company was acquired by QCR Holdings in a cash and stock deal valued at approximately $144 million.
