= KYTV (TV station) =

Television station in Springfield, Missouri

- Springfield, Missouri; United States
- Channels: Digital: 19 (UHF); Virtual: 3
- Branding: KY3; KSPR ABC (33.1); Ozarks CW (33.2)

Programming
- Affiliations: 3.1: NBC; 33.1: ABC; 33.2: The CW; for others, see § Subchannels

Ownership
- Owner: Gray Media; (Gray Television Licensee, LLC)
- Sister stations: KSPR-LD, KYCW-LD

History
- First air date: October 1, 1953
- Former channel numbers: Analog: 3 (VHF, 1953–2009); Digital: 44 (UHF, 2009–2018)
- Former affiliations: ABC (secondary, 1953–1967); UPN (3.2, via KSPR-LD, until 2006); The CW (3.2, via KSPR-LD, 2006–2010); ABC (3.2, via KSPR-LD, January–February 2017); Simulcast of KSPR-LD (3.3, April–May 2017)
- Call sign meaning: Your Television

Technical information
- Licensing authority: FCC
- Facility ID: 36003
- ERP: 1,000 kW
- HAAT: 623.8 m (2,046.6 ft)
- Transmitter coordinates: 37°10′26″N 92°56′28.1″W

Links
- Public license information: Public file; LMS
- Website: www.ky3.com

KYTV (channel 3) is a television station in Springfield, Missouri, United States, affiliated with NBC. It is owned by Gray Media alongside ABC affiliate KSPR-LD (channel 33) and Branson-licensed CW affiliate KYCW-LD (channel 24); it is also sister to Branson-licensed tourist information–formatted station K17DL-D, channel 17 (which is owned by Branson Visitors TV, LLC, a joint venture between Gray [50.1%] and Market Branson, LLC [49.9%]). KYTV, KSPR-LD and KYCW-LD share studios on West Sunshine Street in Springfield, while KYTV's transmitter is located on Highway FF north of Fordland.

== History ==
The station first signed on the air on October 1, 1953, becoming the second television station to sign on in the Springfield market; the first was CBS affiliate KTTS-TV (channel 10, now KOLR), which signed on in March of that same year. Founded by Lester E. Cox and the Duvalls, it operated from a studio on West Sunshine Street, the first facility located west of the Mississippi River that was built specifically for television production. Channel 3 has been an NBC affiliate since its sign-on, although it also shared a secondary ABC-affiliation with KTTS until KMTC (channel 27, now MyNetworkTV affiliate KOZL-TV) signed on in 1968. On December 26, 1953, KYTV debuted a television broadcast of the show Ozark Jubilee, a live country music program which originated on radio station KWTO (560 AM), owned by Lester E. Cox; ABC began televising the program nationally on January 22, 1955, although it temporarily originated from Columbia until it moved to the Jewell Theatre on April 30 using KYTV's staff and equipment. The station's staff and facilities also played key roles in the production of two other programs that aired on ABC during the 1950s shows Talent Varieties and The Eddy Arnold Show.

KYTV purchased remote broadcasting equipment in 1954. Its first remote broadcast originated that year from the Ozark Empire Fair. Remote telecasts were also brought to viewers from the Plaza Bowl featuring area bowling teams. Other remotes included Springfield Christmas parades, "Man with a Mike" from the Tower Theater on the Plaza, sporting events, and (beginning in 1986) the station's Celebrate the Ozarks program. KYTV purchased one of the nation's first mobile videotape units in March 1959. That year, the station videotaped the dedication of Table Rock Dam and produced Harold Bell Wright's The Shepherd of the Hills on location in Branson. From March 17 to September 22, 1961, KYTV transmitted Five Star Jubilee to NBC from the Landers Theatre. It was the first network color television program to originate outside of New York City or Hollywood although KYTV could not yet broadcast the show locally in color. In 1970, the station adopted its current on-air name, "KY3."

In 1973, the station built a 608.4-meter (1,996 ft) transmission tower in Marshfield, which became the tallest structure in Missouri, approaching nearly 2,000 feet (610 m)—more than three times the height of the Gateway Arch in St. Louis. In 1978, the station was sold to Harte-Hanks Communications. Harte-Hanks sold the station to South Bend, Indiana-based Schurz Communications in 1987. In 1997, Schurz migrated KYTV's operations from its original building on West Sunshine Street into new facilities adjacent to the original studio.

In 2000, KYTV erected a 609.4-meter (1,999 ft) tower in Fordland for its digital transmitter; the towers in Marshfield and Fordland were surpassed in 2001 by a 609.6-meter (2,000 ft) tower in Syracuse, used by PBS member station KMOS-TV in Sedalia, which was only 0.2 meters (7.9 in) higher than either of KYTV's towers, which remain the second and third tallest structures in the state and are among the tallest structures in the world.

On September 21, 2006, Schurz entered into a deal in which Perkin Media would acquire ABC affiliate KSPR (channel 33, later KGHZ) from Piedmont Television and manage that station under a shared services agreement. Under the deal, Schurz controlled all of KSPR's non-license assets, with Perkin serving as the owner of that station's FCC broadcast license; channel 33's operations remained at its studio facility on East Saint Louis Street until November 2009, when KSPR moved into a new newsroom and studio addition built onto the Sunshine Street facility.

KYTV ended regular programming on its analog signal, over VHF channel 3, on June 12, 2009, the official date on which full-power television stations in the United States transitioned from analog to digital broadcasts under federal mandate. The station's digital signal remained on its pre-transition UHF channel 44, using virtual channel 3. As part of the SAFER Act, KYTV kept its analog signal on the air until June 26 to inform viewers of the digital television transition through a loop of public service announcements from the National Association of Broadcasters.

Schurz announced on September 14, 2015 that it would exit broadcasting and sell its television and radio stations, including KYTV, K15CZ-D (channel 15, now KSPR-LD), and the SSA with KSPR, to Gray Television for $442.5 million. The FCC approved the sale on February 12, 2016, and the sale was completed on February 16, 2016.

== News operation ==
KYTV presently broadcasts 26 1/2 hours of locally produced newscasts each week (with 4 1/2 hours on weekdays and two hours each on Saturdays and Sundays); in addition, the station produces the half-hour sports highlight program O-Zone Sports, which airs Sundays at 10:30 p.m. The station operates its own Doppler radar system, called "Storm Tracker 3", near its transmitter in Fordland. All news anchors may also serve as reporters. For many years, channel 3's newscasts have been in first place in the market, and as of 2013, its news programs have ranked #1 in all timeslots according to Nielsen Media Research.

Since its sign-on, the station has been airing nightly 6 and 10 o'clock broadcasts. A satellite news gathering truck was purchased in 1986. In November 2006, KYTV debuted a new set for its newscasts, which integrated the weather center into the main studio; it also included a background that could be lowered over the set used for sports segments to convert it into an interview area, which changed with the time of day (such as the morning featuring a picture of a sunrise over Springfield). The former weather area was turned into the "Virtual Newsroom", which was later renamed the "KY3 Web Center", where Internet-related news topics are discussed.

Although KSPR moved into KYTV's studio facilities on November 1, 2009, the two stations continued to maintain separate news departments for nearly eight years, occasionally sharing footage for certain news stories. On January 28, 2010, beginning with the 5:00 p.m. newscast, KYTV began broadcasting its local newscasts in high definition; with the upgrade, came the introduction of a new logo and an updated graphics package. In-studio cameras record in HD, however video from field cameras continued to be broadcast in standard definition and upconverted to a 16:9 widescreen format in the control room until June 28, 2011, when the station began transmitting field video in high definition. On August 22, 2011, KYTV began producing an hour-long extension of Ozarks Today on weekday mornings from 7:00 to 8:00 a.m., and a half-hour 9:00 p.m. newscast (which expanded to one hour in June 2013) for CW affiliate KYCW-LD; this is despite the fact that the station is simulcast on the second digital subchannel of ABC-affiliated sister station KSPR-LD.

In 2017, the news operations of KYTV and KSPR were consolidated. KSPR retains unique local news broadcasts at 11 a.m. and 4 p.m., while at most other times, the stations air combined newscasts. Additionally, Ozarks Today expanded to a fourth hour, airing from 8 to 9, and the KYTV noon news was extended to a full hour. On September 6, 2021, KYTV added an 11 a.m. newscast replacing The Andy Griffith Show, after the station's rights to the show expired without renewal in deference to its distributor's exclusive national deal with MeTV (seen in Springfield on the third subchannel of KSPR-LD).

=== Notable former on-air staff ===
- Norma Champion – former children's show host (1957–1986)
- Slim Wilson – country music host (1964–1975)

== Subchannels ==
The station's signal is multiplexed:

Subchannels of KYTV
| Subchannel | Res. | Short name | Programming |
|---|---|---|---|
| 3.1 | 1080i | KYTVHD | NBC |
| 3.4 | 480i | KYTVOUT | Outlaw |
| 3.5 | 480i | TrCrime | True Crime Network (4:3) |
| 3.6 | 480i | Quest | Quest (4:3) |
| 33.1 | 720p | KSPR | ABC (KSPR-LD) |
| 33.2 | 480i | KYCW | The CW (KYCW-LD) in SD |

Simulcast of subchannels of another station

On December 31, 2008, with the discontinuation of NBC Weather Plus, the station changed the name of its weather offering to KY3 24/7.

On January 2, 2017, KYTV moved its 24/7 weather channel, which had become known as KY3 Weather Nation, to a subchannel of KYCW-LD. On the same day, it added a subchannel simulcasting ABC programming from KSPR 33.1. KYTV notified viewers, saying, "You may notice two KSPR 33.1 subchannels. That is normal, for now." On May 31, 2017, Cozi TV (which was available on DT3) was moved to a subchannel of KYCW-LD, mapped to 3.3.
