= K17DL-D =

Television station in Branson, Missouri

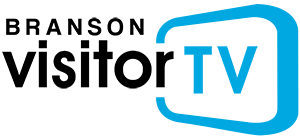
- Branson–Springfield, Missouri; United States
- City: Branson, Missouri
- Channels: Digital: 17 (UHF); Virtual: 17
- Branding: Branson Visitor TV

Programming
- Subchannels: 3.2: WeatherNation TV; 17.1: Tourist information; 25.2: The CW

Ownership
- Owner: Branson Visitors TV, LLC (Gray Media (50.1%); Market Branson, LLC (49.9%))
- Sister stations: KYTV, KSPR-LD, KYCW-LD

History
- Founded: March 3, 1993
- First air date: January 16, 1995
- Former call signs: K17DL (1993–2009)
- Former channel numbers: Analog: 17 (UHF, 1995–2009)
- Former affiliations: UPN (1995–2006); The CW (2006–2009, moved to D2)

Technical information
- Licensing authority: FCC
- Facility ID: 23969
- ERP: 2.1 kW
- HAAT: 214.6 m (704.1 ft)
- Transmitter coordinates: 36°44′53.5″N 93°16′38″W

Links
- Public license information: LMS
- Website: www.bransonvisitortv.com

K17DL-D (channel 17) is a low-power tourist information–formatted television station in Branson, Missouri, United States, serving the Springfield area. It is owned by Branson Visitors TV, LLC, a joint venture between Gray Media (50.1%) and Market Branson, LLC (49.9%); Gray's interest makes K17DL-D a sister station to Springfield-based NBC affiliate KYTV (channel 3), ABC affiliate KSPR-LD (channel 33), and CW affiliate KYCW-LD (channel 25). K17DL-D's transmitter is located on US 160 in western Taney County.

== History ==
The original construction permit to construct a low-power station on channel 17 in Branson was issued on March 3, 1993, and issued the call sign K17DL; on May 16, 1994, original owner Lorianne Crook-Owens sold the station to GEP, Inc. On July 26, 1999, K17DL, along with K05JQ (channel 5, now defunct) and Springfield-based K15CZ (channel 15, now KSPR-LD), was sold to Miller Family Broadcasting. By this point, channel 17 had come on the air through a series of special temporary authority grants and was simulcasting UPN programming with K15CZ; the station was fully licensed on January 14, 2002. Miller sold K17DL and K15CZ to Schurz Communications, owner of KYTV, on March 14, 2002. After UPN and The WB closed down to form The CW in 2006, K17DL and K15CZ affiliated with the new network.

On May 20, 2009, Schurz sold a 49.9-percent interest in K17DL to Market Branson for $250,000; following the sale, the station dropped CW programming (moving to LD2) and began carrying tourist information. The station also converted to digital television and began broadcasting in high definition; consequently, the call sign was modified to K17DL-D on May 29, 2009. Schurz' remaining 50.1-percent interest in channel 17 was included in Gray Television's purchase of Schurz' television stations.

== Subchannels ==
The station's signal is multiplexed:

Subchannels of K17DL-D
Subchannel	Res.	Short name	Programming
3.2	480i	KYWX	Simulcast of KYCW-LD2 / WeatherNation
17.1	720p	BVTV	Main K17DL-D programming / Tourist information/Independent
25.2	720p	KYCW	Simulcast of KYTV-DT2 / The CW
