= KRCG =

Television station in Jefferson City, Missouri

- Jefferson City–Columbia–Fulton, Missouri; United States
- City: Jefferson City, Missouri
- Channels: Digital: 29 (UHF); Virtual: 13
- Branding: KRCG 13; KRCG News

Programming
- Affiliations: 13.1: CBS; for others, see § Subchannels

Ownership
- Owner: Sinclair Broadcast Group; (KRCG Licensee, LLC)

History
- First air date: February 13, 1955
- Former channel numbers: Analog: 13 (VHF, 1955–2009); Digital: 12 (VHF, 2001–2022)
- Former affiliations: All secondary: ABC (1955–1971); NTA (1956–1961); Fox (late 1980s–early 1990s); UPN (1995–2004)
- Call sign meaning: Robert C. Goshorn (named in memory of original owner's father)

Technical information
- Licensing authority: FCC
- Facility ID: 41110
- ERP: 1,000 kW
- HAAT: 304.8 m (1,000 ft)
- Transmitter coordinates: 38°41′30″N 92°5′45″W

Links
- Public license information: Public file; LMS
- Website: krcgtv.com

KRCG (channel 13) is a television station licensed to Jefferson City, Missouri, United States, serving as the CBS affiliate for the Columbia–Jefferson City market. Owned by Sinclair Broadcast Group, the station maintains studios and transmitter facilities on US 54 in the nearby town of New Bloomfield.

== History ==
The station was founded on February 13, 1955, and was owned by the Jefferson City News Tribune. The paper's publisher, Betty Goshorn Weldon, named the station in honor of her late father, Robert C. Goshorn, who had long wanted to bring a television station to the area. Ms. Weldon inherited the paper on his death in 1953 and took over his dream. She thus became one of the first women to own and operate a television station.

KRCG has always been a CBS affiliate, although it had shared some ABC programming with KOMU-TV (channel 8) until KCBJ-TV (channel 17, now KMIZ) signed on in 1971. (Note: For the week of March 31, 1957, KRCG carried 85 CBS programs, two ABC programs, four NTA programs, 16 syndicated programs, and various local shows.) It is the only station in Mid-Missouri to have never changed its affiliation. KOMU and KMIZ have switched their networks twice (first in 1982, then reverting to their original networks in 1986). During the late 1950s, the station was also briefly affiliated with the NTA Film Network.

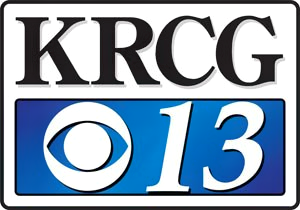
Former KRCG logo, used until 2016.

In 1961, the News Tribune bought KMOS-TV (channel 6) in Sedalia, operating it as a full-time satellite station for the western portion of the market. However, later in the decade, KMOS began breaking away from KRCG to produce its own newscasts at 6 and 10 p.m. KRCG operated KMOS at a relatively low power level, and shied away from selling KMOS to another commercial owner. By this time, the Columbia–Jefferson City area was just barely big enough to support a third full network affiliate. With this in mind, KRCG and KOMU feared that if KMOS was sold, the station could potentially become a full-power ABC affiliate.

In 1967, KRCG and KMOS were sold to Kansas City Southern Industries. In 1978, Kansas City Southern donated KMOS to Central Missouri State University (now the University of Central Missouri) in Warrensburg. At that time, KMOS was converted to a stand-alone PBS member station. KRCG then signed on a Sedalia translator, K11OJ. In the late 1980s and early 1990s, KRCG carried some Fox programming on late night weekends. In 1985, Kansas City Southern sold the station to Price Communications. In 1988, KRCG was sold to Mel Wheeler, Inc., which owned the station until March 2005, when KRCG was purchased by Barrington Broadcasting. During the Wheeler years, KRCG gained a secondary affiliation with the United Paramount Network (UPN). On February 28, 2013, Barrington Broadcasting announced the sale of its entire group, including KRCG, to Sinclair Broadcast Group. The sale was completed on November 25.

In August 2014, KRCG launched its first digital subchannel, broadcasting GetTV programming on channel 13.2.

== News operation ==
KRCG spent most of its history as a distant runner-up to KOMU. It traditionally dominated Jefferson City and the southern half of the market, while KOMU led the way in the northern half. At the turn of the millennium, this pattern had progressed to the extent that the two cities were a single market in name only. In November 2006, however, KRCG's 10 p.m. newscast took first place in the market—the first time in memory that long-dominant KOMU had lost any timeslot. As of the February 2011 sweeps, KRCG remains first at 10 p.m.

On May 9, 2016, KRCG began broadcasting from a remodeled studio. With the remodel, KRCG became the final news operation in the Columbia–Jefferson City market to broadcast its news in high definition.

== Technical information ==
=== Subchannels ===
The station's signal is multiplexed:

Subchannels of KRCG
| Channel | Res. | Short name | Programming |
|---|---|---|---|
| 13.1 | 1080i | CBS | CBS |
| 13.2 | 480i | Comet | Comet |
| 13.3 | 480i | Charge! | Charge! |
| 13.4 | 480i | ROAR | Roar |
| 13.5 | 480i | TheNest | The Nest |

=== Analog-to-digital conversion ===
KRCG ended regular programming on its analog signal, over VHF channel 13, on June 12, 2009, the official date on which full-power television stations in the United States transitioned from analog to digital broadcasts under federal mandate. The station's digital signal remained on its pre-transition VHF channel 12, using virtual channel 13.

As part of the SAFER Act, KRCG kept its analog signal on the air until July 12 to inform viewers of the digital television transition through a loop of public service announcements from the National Association of Broadcasters.

On June 29, 2022, KRCG completed the channel move from VHF channel 12 to UHF channel 29.

== Out of market coverage ==
Until 2010, KRCG operated an analog translator, K11OJ (channel 11) in Sedalia, located within the Kansas City market. That translator has long been shut down, and the station files associated with that translator were deleted by the FCC no later than March 2014.

== See also ==
- KMOS-TV (former KRCG satellite, now a PBS member station)
