= KCPT =

Television station in Kansas City, Missouri

- Kansas City–St. Joseph, Missouri; United States
- City: Kansas City, Missouri
- Channels: Digital: 18 (UHF); Virtual: 19
- Branding: Kansas City PBS

Programming
- Affiliations: 19.1: PBS; for others, see § Subchannels

Ownership
- Owner: Public Television 19, Inc.
- Sister stations: KTBG

History
- First air date: March 29, 1961
- Former call signs: KCSD-TV (1961–1971)
- Former channel numbers: Analog: 19 (UHF, 1961–2009)
- Former affiliations: NET (1961–1970)
- Call sign meaning: Kansas City Public Television

Technical information
- Licensing authority: FCC
- Facility ID: 53843
- ERP: 1,000 kW
- HAAT: 355 m (1,165 ft)
- Transmitter coordinates: 39°4′58.7″N 94°28′50.1″W

Links
- Public license information: Public file; LMS
- Website: www.kansascitypbs.org

KCPT (channel 19), branded as Kansas City PBS or KC PBS, is a PBS member television station in Kansas City, Missouri, United States. It is owned by Public Television 19, Inc., alongside adult-album-alternative radio station KTBG (90.9 FM) and online magazine Flatland. KCPT and KTBG share studios on East 31st Street in the Union Hill section of Kansas City, Missouri. KCPT's transmitter is located near 23rd Street and Stark Avenue in the Blue Valley neighborhood. The station provides coverage to the Kansas City and St. Joseph areas.

KCPT went on air as KCSD-TV, the television station of the Kansas City School District, on March 29, 1961. The school district used the station to broadcast instructional programming to its schools and also aired evening programming from National Educational Television, predecessor to PBS. When members of the city school board began to disagree on which function of the station was more important amid a financial crunch, the case was made for the school district to spin out KCSD-TV to a community-owned non-profit organization. This officially took place at the start of 1972, at which time the station changed call signs to KCPT. In part by acquiring assets of the defunct KCIT-TV at bankruptcy auction, channel 19 improved its signal and began color telecasting. In addition, KCPT began producing local programming for the first time.

KCPT moved in 1978 from studios near the transmitter site to the former KCMO-TV building in Union Hill in 1978. In the 1990s, KCPT debuted Kansas City Week in Review, an ongoing public affairs series, and was among the first public TV stations to begin broadcasting a digital signal. When analog telecasting ceased in 2009, KCPT began offering additional subchannels of programming.

Since 2013, KCPT has expanded into related public media businesses by purchasing a radio station and moving it into the Kansas City area as KTBG, starting Flatland, and setting up a local newsroom.

== History ==
=== Founded by schools ===
Ultra high frequency (UHF) channel 19 was allocated to Kansas City for educational television use in 1952, and in 1958, the Kansas City School District began investigating the possibility of building such a station. The Electron Corporation of Dallas offered free use of a low-power transmission system it wanted to try.

In October 1959, the school board authorized the filing of an application with the Federal Communications Commission (FCC) for the channel, and in March 1960, the school board sought bids for equipment.

The construction permit was awarded on March 24, 1960, but the school system was still noncommittal about proceeding with the station, even though the 11th floor of the library and administration building was being refitted as a television studio. Delays in finishing the studio in turn delayed the launch of the station.

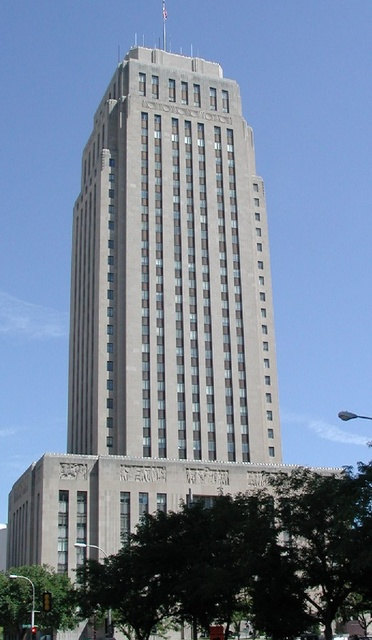
KCSD-TV began broadcasting from an antenna atop Kansas City City Hall.

KCSD-TV began broadcasting on March 29, 1961, using the studios in the administration building and an antenna on Kansas City City Hall. The first program was a presentation to faculty, including a tour of the studios. On April 4, the first programs for schools were broadcast and every television set in the schools had to be converted to receive UHF stations. In September, the board of education authorized KCSD-TV to join National Educational Television (NET), allowing it to present adult education programming at night beginning in February 1962. As with the schools, the public would need to convert TV sets to receive KCSD-TV, the only UHF station in Kansas City at the time.

Though the Kansas City School District invited other nearby school systems in western Missouri and far eastern Kansas to use KCSD-TV programming, some systems in outlying areas were not covered. Additionally, as a result of increasing interest in the adult education programming, in 1963, KCSD-TV applied for and received a federal grant to increase its transmission power, which took effect for the late 1964 television season. Efforts were made toward regional planning to give school districts in the expanded coverage area a voice in KCSD-TV's educational programming.

=== From educational to public television ===
The growth of adult programming on KCSD-TV had increased the station's year-round payroll from two employees in 1963 to 13 in 1969. However, by 1969, the school board faced a financial crisis that ultimately led it to lay off more than 250 people. This exacerbated existing conflict within the school board as to the purpose of KCSD-TV. Board president Homer C. Wadsworth proposed the establishment of a community advisory board for the station in 1966, in order to enhance the effectiveness of its evening programming for adults; however, the idea met with opposition from several board members.

As a result of the financial issues in the school district, superintendent James A. Hazlett recommended that the station cut $125,000 from its $275,000 budget by ceasing local production of educational programs for schools, instead purchasing series produced elsewhere. Two board members instead preferred cuts to the evening programming, one saying that the station's programs for adults were an unnecessary expense in a year when the board had to increase school lunch prices. Others, including Wadsworth and former University of Missouri–Kansas City chancellor Carleton Scofield, noted that federal funding for public television was increasing and called any cuts to that portion unwise.

In July 1970, the school board voted to fully fund instructional television and provide half funding for public television for the 1970–1971 school year, after which it would quit supporting KCSD-TV. A new public non-profit corporation backed by Scofield and Wadsworth was being formed to pick up the remainder and eventually become the licensee. The group struggled to attract public interest to its efforts at first. A press conference to announce locally the fall lineup of PBS, which was replacing NET as the national network for public television stations, met with poor attendance from the news media.

=== New owners, more power, and color ===
Community Service Broadcasting of Mid-America (CSB) was formed in January 1971 with a board of 23 local civic and business leaders. It was chaired by Edward T. Matheny Jr., who had served as attorney for the school board. In August 1971, the board approved the transfer of the KCSD-TV license to CSB with the stipulation that the new licensee provide five hours on weekdays for the broadcast of programs for schools, to be primarily financed by the Kansas City school district. In addition, CSB leased the school district's facilities until it could relocate the station.

One of the major issues facing CSB was KCSD-TV's signal quality. In addition to being incapable of telecasting in color, it had a weak signal. Two new UHF stations had started in Kansas City in 1969 and 1970, both broadcasting with more effective radiated power than KCSD-TV: KCIT-TV on channel 50 and KBMA-TV on channel 41. CSB had a natural opportunity to improve this situation. KCIT-TV had struggled financially in just under two years on the air and left the air for good in early July 1971. RCA, a major creditor of the failed station, had repossessed the transmitter facility, and a bankruptcy auction was scheduled in late October for 10 acres of land and a building in Blue Summit. CSB won the bidding, described as "exciting" by Harry Jones Jr. of The Kansas City Star, over Andrew "Skip" Carter—owner of the city's Black radio station, KPRS—and a surprise entrant to the auction, a local banker. CSB briefly considered applying for channel 50 as a second station, but it opted to focus on improving channel 19 first.

The FCC granted approval for the transfer of KCSD-TV's license to CSB on December 10, 1971. On December 31, the call letters were changed to KCPT, for Kansas City Public Television. In January 1972, CSB agreed to purchase the tower from RCA and new channel 19 transmitting equipment from General Electric. In mid-1972, work took place to ready the studios in Blue Summit and to prepare a new instructional television program, benefiting from CSB's superior financial resources compared to the Kansas City School District and a cooperative equipment purchase plan to aid schools without color TV sets. KCPT began broadcasting in color and with its increased power on October 16, 1972.

In 1973, the station held its first televised auction to purchase equipment for local program production. John Masterman, a former WDAF-TV newsman, joined KCPT in 1974 and began producing public affairs programs. In a 19-year tenure at channel 19, he led such local shows as Kansas City Illustrated and produced documentaries.

By 1976, CSB had changed its name to Public Television 19, Inc.

=== New studios ===
KCMO-TV (channel 5) and KCMO radio announced in 1976 that they would leave their longtime home on 31st Street—now considered in the Union Hill neighborhood—to a new facility to be built in Fairway, Kansas. KCPT then agreed to purchase the 31st Street studios from KCMO. For KCPT, the former KCMO studios were a major upgrade over Blue Summit. The station would have two large studios instead of one small studio, additional storage space, and a film lab. The transaction did not include the tower on the site, which continued to be used to broadcast KCMO-TV. KCMO completed its move to Fairway at the end of 1977, with KCPT moving into 31st Street shortly after.

The Missouri Lottery's first televised drawings were conducted from the KCPT studios when the lottery began in 1986. Though a network of commercial stations led by KCTV held the rights to the telecasts, KCTV could not produce the show in its facilities in Kansas, and only KCPT had adequate space for the observers required by the lottery.

In the 1980s, KCPT attempted to build a full-power satellite station in St. Joseph on channel 22. It filed for the channel in 1983, won the construction permit, and attempted to build the proposed transmitter with call letters KMPT. However, construction of the station was contingent on the availability of the proposed transmitter site: the existing tower in St. Joseph of KQTV. That station was planning to build a new, taller tower in Kansas and let KCPT use the vacated tower space for its broadcasts. However, the FCC denied approval for the proposed change to KQTV's facility because it would leave nearly 5,000 rural residents without broadcast television.

Joseph Fuzy, KCPT's general manager, retired in 1992 after 18 years. He advanced his retirement to save the station money during a budget crunch. He was replaced by Bill Reed. In 1996, KCPT followed KCET in Los Angeles by opening a Store of Knowledge in Kansas City's Country Club Plaza. The hope was that the venture would help replace diminishing federal funds for public broadcasting. The station took no responsibility for losses or day-to-day operations while receiving 25 percent of profits. After the later addition of a second Store of Knowledge, the venture lasted less than five years, closing nationally in June 2001.

One local series launched at KCPT in the 1990s became a station staple, and another remains on the air. Rare Visions & Roadside Revelations, a travel program, became a regular series after positive response to a special produced the previous year. The program had a 12-season run, traveling to 40 states, and won regional awards. Kansas City Week in Review was started by John Masterman in 1992 and was conceived as a counterpart to the national Washington Week in Review. It has been anchored by Nick Haines since 1997, who had joined as a Kansas statehouse panelist in 2014.

=== Digitalization ===
KCPT became the first Kansas City station to begin digital telecasting when KCPT-DT on channel 18 began operating on November 6, 1998. KCPT was the first client for a new television transmitter capable of broadcasting in analog and digital on adjacent channels. Delays in the acquisition of a new analog transmitter helped to advance the digital launch. Initially, KCPT received high-definition programs directly from PBS in Virginia, as its master control facility could not handle them. In 2000, the station produced Uniquely Kansas City, a multi-part series that was the first high-definition television production in the market.

In the late 1990s, KCPT extended its educational services in partnership with a consortium of local community colleges, known as the Kansas City Regional Access Consortium for Higher Education (KC REACHE). In overnight hours when the station once was off the air, it began broadcasting distance learning courses in 1998. The program quickly grew from a pilot to include 10 institutions and serve 6,700 adults by 2001.

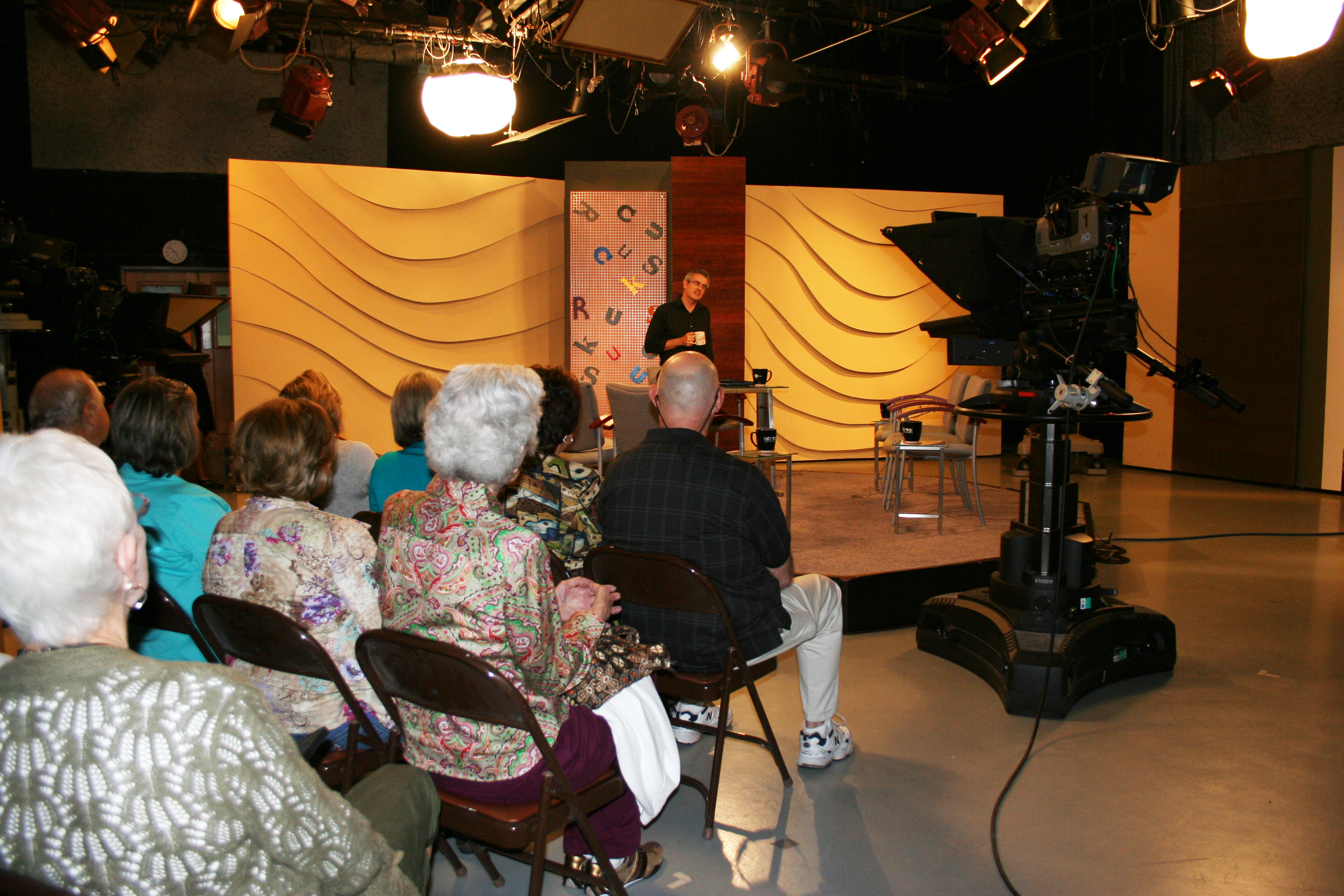
A live broadcast of KCPT's Ruckus, which aired for 23 seasons

In 2001, KCPT celebrated 40 years of broadcasting. At the time, the station had just completed a $6 million renovation of its studios, including an expansion in which KCPT extended the facility to cover where other businesses had stood. A capital campaign to pay for the digital television conversion also was intended to start a $2 million local program endowment in honor of Masterman. However, the economy declined, and the September 11 attacks further diminished charitable giving. As a result of declining revenues, in 2002, Reed canceled plans for the endowment and discontinued the public affairs series Ruckus, laying off four staffers. Ruckus later returned to the air for a total of 23 seasons and was put on hiatus in 2020. In 2004, KCPT won a National Emmy Award for Best Documentary for Be Good, Smile Pretty, a film which documents Tracy Droz Tragos's journey to find the father she lost in Vietnam and aired nationally on Independent Lens.

In the mid- to late 2000s, the station had two changes in leadership. Reed retired in 2005 and was replaced by Victor Hogstrom, who had built a reputation as a revenue generator in his previous position at WTCI in Chattanooga, Tennessee. After Hogstrom resigned in 2008, he was replaced by Kliff Kuehl, previously of KNPB in Reno, Nevada.

In advance of the 2009 shutdown of full-power analog broadcasting, KCPT launched a second subchannel, KCPT2, airing programs different to those on the main channel plus shows not offered by the main station. KCPT shut down its analog signal on June 12, 2009, the official date full-power television stations in the United States transitioned from analog to digital broadcasts under federal mandate. The station's digital signal continued to broadcast on its pre-transition UHF channel 18. The national transition allowed KCPT to send out a higher-power digital signal because of the closure of analog KAAS-TV in Salina, Kansas.

=== Beyond public television ===
In December 2013, KCPT gained a sister radio station when Public Television 19, Inc. finalized its purchase of KTBG (90.9 FM) in Warrensburg from the University of Central Missouri for $1.1 million, plus $550,000 in in-kind services. The transmitter for the station was moved 20 miles (32 km) west to adequately cover most of the Kansas City area. Earlier that year, an anonymous donation of nearly $4 million allowed the station to start a digital newsroom. In 2014, KCPT launched the online magazine Flatland. Flatland expanded in 2021 with a new monthly half-hour show.

In 2020, KCPT rebranded as Kansas City PBS, bringing its brand closer to that of the national network. The station embarked on a new capital campaign named Picture This in 2022. Most of the $16.5 million initiative, primarily raised privately, went toward remodeling the studio complex and adding space for events and performances, and the remainder was used for technology and new content initiatives. Construction work concluded in June 2023.

== Funding ==
In 2021, KCPT generated $13.4 million in total revenue, $1.4 million of that in the form of grants from the Corporation for Public Broadcasting. $3.6 million in revenue was earned from nearly 30,000 contributors. The station also received $1.5 million in major gifts and $1 million in endowment income. That year, there were $9.8 million in direct expenditures.

== Subchannels ==
KCPT's transmitter is located near 23rd Street and Stark Avenue in the Blue Valley neighborhood of Kansas City, Missouri. The station's signal is multiplexed:

Subchannels of KCPT
Subchannel	Res.	Short name	Programming
19.1	1080i	KCPT-1	PBS
19.2	1080i	KCPT-2	KCPT2
19.3	480i	KCPT-3	Create
19.4	480i	KCPT-4	PBS Kids
