= KYCW-LD =

Television station in Branson, Missouri

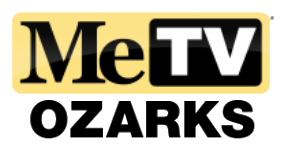
- Branson–Springfield, Missouri; United States
- City: Branson, Missouri
- Channels: Digital: 24 (UHF); Virtual: 24
- Branding: Ozarks CW; MeTV Ozarks (on 24.6)

Programming
- Affiliations: 24.1: The CW; for others, see § Subchannels

Ownership
- Owner: Gray Media; (Gray Television Licensee, LLC)
- Sister stations: KYTV, KSPR-LD, K17DL-D

History
- First air date: January 24, 1986
- Former call signs: K25BD (1986–2013); K25BD-D (2013–2017)
- Former channel numbers: Analog: 25 (UHF, 1986–2013); Digital: 25 (UHF, 2013–2020); Virtual: 25 (2013–2020)
- Former affiliations: EICB TV (until 2017)
- Call sign meaning: KY3's CW (reflecting sister station)

Technical information
- Licensing authority: FCC
- Facility ID: 11135
- Class: LD
- ERP: 15 kW
- HAAT: 511 m (1,677 ft)
- Transmitter coordinates: 37°10′26″N 92°56′28.1″W
- Translator(s): KYTV/KSPR-LD2 33.2 Springfield; K17DL-D 25.2 Branson

Links
- Public license information: LMS

KYCW-LD (channel 24) is a low-power television station licensed to Branson, Missouri, United States, serving the Springfield area as an affiliate of The CW. It is owned by Gray Media alongside NBC affiliate KYTV (channel 3) and ABC affiliate KSPR-LD (channel 33); it is also sister to Branson-licensed tourist information–formatted station K17DL-D, channel 17 (which is owned by Branson Visitors TV, LLC, a joint venture between Gray [50.1%] and Market Branson, LLC [49.9%]). KYCW-LD, KYTV and KSPR-LD share studios on West Sunshine Street in Springfield, while KYCW-LD's transmitter is located on Highway FF north of Fordland.

KYCW-LD's low-power broadcasting radius does not reach the entire market. Therefore, it is simulcast in 16:9 widescreen standard definition on KYTV's third digital subchannel (33.2), and in high definition on KSPR-LD's second digital subchannel (also mapped to virtual channel 24.1); it is also simulcast to Branson on K17DL's digital subchannel (24.2).

== Subchannels ==
The station's signal is multiplexed:

Subchannel of KYCW-LD
Subchannel	Res.	Short name	Programming
3.2	480i	247WX	WeatherNation TV
3.3	480i	COZITV	Cozi TV
17.1	720p	BVTV	K17DL-D (tourist information)
24.1	720p	KYCWLD	The CW
24.2	480i	IONPLUS	Ion Plus (4:3)
24.6	480i	MeTV	MeTV

Simulcast of subchannels of another station
