= KSPR-LD =

Television station in Springfield, Missouri

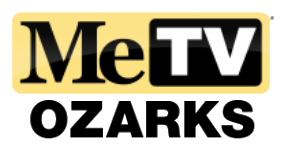
- Springfield, Missouri; United States
- Channels: Digital: 34 (UHF); Virtual: 33
- Branding: KSPR ABC; MeTV Ozarks (33.3); Telemundo Ozarks (33.6)

Programming
- Affiliations: 33.1: ABC; 33.6: Telemundo; for others, see § Subchannels

Ownership
- Owner: Gray Media; (Gray Television Licensee, LLC)
- Sister stations: KYTV, KYCW-LD

History
- First air date: March 15, 1990
- Former call signs: K15CZ (1990–2015); K15CZ-D (2015–2016); KYCW-LD (2016–2017)
- Former channel numbers: Analog: 15 (UHF, 1990–2015); Digital: 15 (UHF, 2015–2020); Virtual: 15 (2015–2017)
- Former affiliations: Independent (1990–1995); UPN (1995–2006); The CW (2006–2017; 33.2 2017−2021)
- Call sign meaning: Springfield

Technical information
- Licensing authority: FCC
- Facility ID: 49186
- Class: LD
- ERP: 15 kW
- HAAT: 511 m (1,677 ft)
- Transmitter coordinates: 37°10′26″N 92°56′28.1″W
- Translator(s): KYTV 33.1 Springfield, MO

Links
- Public license information: LMS
- Website: www.ky3.com

KSPR-LD (channel 33) is a low-power television station in Springfield, Missouri, United States, affiliated with ABC. It is owned by Gray Media alongside NBC affiliate KYTV (channel 3) and Branson-licensed CW affiliate KYCW-LD (channel 24); it is also sister to Branson-licensed tourist information–formatted station K17DL-D, channel 17 (which is owned by Branson Visitors TV, LLC, a joint venture between Gray [50.1%] and Market Branson, LLC [49.9%]). KSPR-LD, KYTV and KYCW-LD share studios on West Sunshine Street in Springfield, while KSPR-LD's transmitter is located on Highway FF north of Fordland.

KSPR-LD's low-power digital broadcasting radius does not reach the entire market. Therefore, it is simulcast in high definition on KYTV's second digital subchannel (also mapped to virtual channel 33.1).

== History ==
The station first signed on the air on March 15, 1990, as K15CZ; it originally operated as an independent station. K15CZ formerly operated a repeater station, K17DL in Branson; in 2009, that station was transferred to Branson Visitors TV, LLC (a company in which Schurz holds a 50.1-percent interest) and now airs tourist information for the Branson area. The station became a charter affiliate of the United Paramount Network (UPN) when the network launched on January 16, 1995; the station changed its on-air branding to "UPN 15". In the late 1990s, K15CZ entered into a local marketing agreement with South Bend, Indiana-based Schurz Communications, owners of NBC affiliate KYTV (channel 3); Schurz eventually bought the station outright in 2002.

On January 24, 2006, the Warner Bros. unit of Time Warner and CBS Corporation announced that the two companies would shut down The WB and UPN and combine the networks' respective programming to create a new "fifth" network called The CW. K15CZ became the Springfield market's CW affiliate when the network launched on September 18, 2006; Harrison, Arkansas-licensed KWBM (channel 31) became a charter affiliate of MyNetworkTV, which launched two weeks earlier on September 5 as a secondary replacement for The WB and UPN.

In May 2006, the station obtained the website domain name, theozarkscw.com; this web address redirected to The CW's network website for a time until the station's website officially launched.

Since the station was licensed as a low-power translator, it did not originally offer a digital signal of its own. In 2006, KYTV began carrying a standard definition simulcast of K15CZ; this was subsequently moved to the second digital subchannel of ABC affiliate KSPR-TV (channel 33). The Federal Communications Commission (FCC) granted a construction permit for K15CZ to build digital transmitter facilities, with the digital signal being "flash-cut" into operation on its former analog UHF channel 15 when the transmitter was completed; the digital license was issued on January 23, 2015.

Schurz announced on September 14, 2015, that it would exit broadcasting and sell its television and radio stations, including K15CZ-D, KYTV, and the SSA with KSPR, to Gray Television for $442.5 million. On March 10, 2016, K15CZ-D was authorized by the FCC to change their call letters to KYCW-LD.

The call letters were again changed, to KSPR-LD, on February 1, 2017. This was in accordance with the deal that saw Schurz sell its entire television division, including KYTV, to Gray. As part of the deal, KYTV ended its joint sales agreement with KSPR-TV, and Gray entered the channel 33 license into the FCC's broadcast incentive auction.

Also as part of the deal, the original KSPR changed its call letters to KGHZ, while the KYCW-LD call sign was transferred to K25BD-D (channel 25) in Branson. Shortly after the change in callsigns, the KSPR intellectual unit, including the ABC affiliation, moved to KSPR-LD, while KGHZ began airing Antenna TV programming. KSPR-LD also traded virtual channel positions with KGHZ, with KGHZ's primary subchannel becoming 15.1 and KSPR-LD's becoming 33.1. On May 31, 2017; Gray signed off KGHZ and returned its license to the FCC. During the transition, KSPR's operations remained unchanged, though over-the-air viewers were asked to rescan their televisions in order to continue watching the station. However, few viewers actually lost access to ABC programming due to the high penetration of cable and satellite, which are all but essential for acceptable television in this vast and mountainous market.

== News operation ==
KSPR-LD presently broadcasts 24 1/2 hours of locally produced newscasts each week (with 4 1/2 hours on weekdays and one hour each on Saturdays and Sundays). Unlike most ABC affiliates, the station does not air a local newscast in the 5 p.m. timeslot on weekdays (syndicated programming fills the half-hour between its 4 p.m. newscast and ABC World News Tonight). KSPR (then on full-power channel 33) launched its news department in 1983; when the station assumed the market's ABC affiliation in 1986, the station expanded its news programming to include newscasts at 6 p.m. on weekdays and 10 p.m. seven nights a week.

On November 1, 2009, when KSPR moved its operations into a renovated portion of KYTV's studio facility, channel 33 became the second television station in the Springfield market to begin broadcasting its local newscasts in high definition; the newscasts are produced out of a secondary set at the Sunshine Street facility. The two stations maintained separate news departments; however, both KSPR-LD and KYTV occasionally shared footage for certain news stories.

KYTV produces 11 1/2 hours of locally produced newscasts each week (with two hours on weekdays, a half-hour on Saturdays and one hour on Sundays) for KSPR-LD2; in addition, the station produces the half-hour sports highlight program O-Zone Sports, which airs Saturdays at 9:30 p.m.

On August 22, 2011, KYTV began producing an hour-long extension of its weekday morning newscast (from 7 to 8 a.m.) and a nightly half-hour 9 p.m. newscast for K15CZ. The 9:00 p.m. newscast was expanded to one hour in June 2013.

On August 18, 2017, reports surfaced that Gray Television (the current owner of both KSPR and KYTV) had laid off many KSPR employees, including news anchor Jerry Jacob. Reports also suggested that Gray Television would either greatly reduce the KSPR news output or eliminate the KSPR news department altogether. The move was met with opposition from loyal KSPR viewers. Ultimately, KYTV's operation took over KSPR's; KSPR retains unique local news broadcasts at 11 a.m. and 4 p.m., while at most other times, the stations air combined newscasts. Additionally, Ozarks Today expanded to a fourth hour, airing from 8 to 9, and the KYTV noon news was extended to a full hour upon consolidation. The KY3-KSPR consolidation has been criticized by some viewers.

== Subchannels ==
The station's signal is multiplexed:

Subchannels of KSPR-LD
Subchannel	Res.	Short name	Programming
33.1	720p	KSPR-LD	ABC
33.3	480i	MeTV	MeTV
33.4	480i	CourtTV	Court TV
33.6	1080i	Tlmndo	Telemundo
