= Mission Ridge =

Mission Ridge may refer to:

- Mission Ridge (British Columbia), a ridge in British Columbia, Canada
- Mission Ridge Winter Park, a ski area in Saskatchewan, Canada
- Mission Ridge Ski Area, a ski resort near Wenatchee, Washington, United States
- Mission Ridge, South Dakota, an unincorporated community in South Dakota, United States
- Mission Ridge, California; consists of Mission Peak, Mount Allison, Monument Peak

== See also ==
- Mission Hills (disambiguation)
- Mission Mountain (disambiguation)
- Mission Peak, near Fremont, California
- Mission Peak (Washington), near Wenatchee, Washington
- Mission Terrace, in San Francisco, California
