= Mission Hills, California =

Mission Hills, California may refer to:

- Mission Hills, Santa Barbara County, California, a census-designated place
- Mission Hills, Los Angeles, a suburban neighborhood
- Mission Hills, San Diego, a suburban neighborhood

== See also ==
- Mission Hills (disambiguation)
- Mission Hills High School, in San Marcos, California
