= Mission Mountain =

Mission Mountain or Mission Mountains may refer to:

== Montana, US ==
- Mission Mountain Railroad, a shortline railroad
- Mission Mountain School, a former therapeutic boarding school for girls
- Mission Mountain Wood Band, an American bluegrass and country rock band
- Mission Mountains, a range of the Rocky Mountains
- Mission Mountains Wilderness, part of the National Wilderness Preservation System

== Canada ==
- Mission Ridge (British Columbia) or Mission Mountain

== See also ==
- Mission Hills (disambiguation)
- Mission Peak, in California
- Mission Ridge (disambiguation)
- Mission Terrace, in San Francisco, California
