= East Bay Walls =

Ancient walls in California, United States

Coordinates: 38°12′20.32″N 122°57′57.67″W

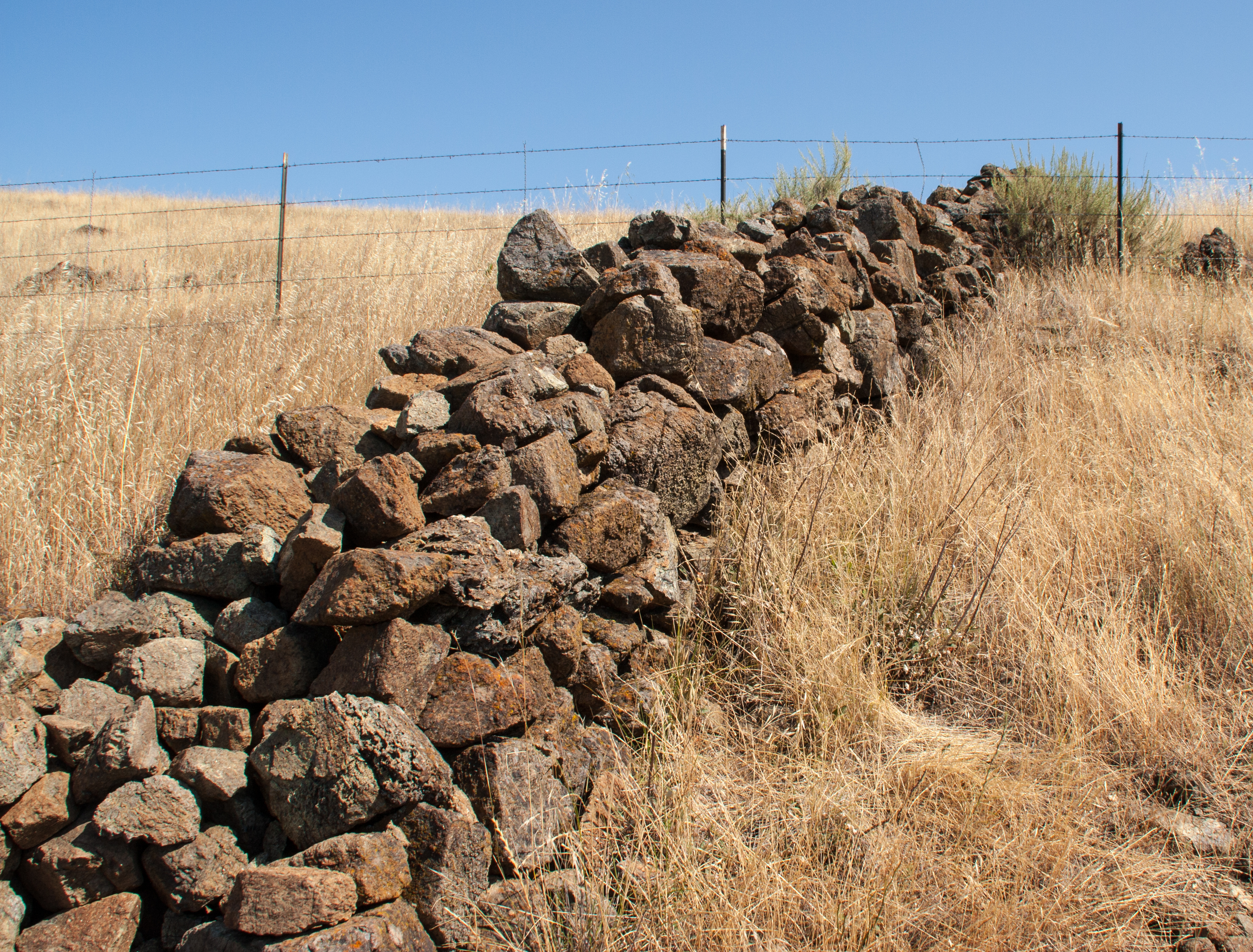
One of many old stone walls found around the southern and eastern San Francisco Bay in California, this one near San Jose

The East Bay Walls, also known as the Berkeley Mystery Walls, are a misnomer, as many such walls can be found throughout the hills surrounding the San Francisco Bay Area, and extend as far as Chico, Red Bluff and Montague. In places, they are up to a meter high and a meter wide and are built without mortar. The walls extend anywhere from a few meters to over a half mile. Materials range in size from basketball-size to sandstone boulders weighing a ton or more. Parts of the wall seem to be just piles of rocks, while other walls were carefully constructed. The exact age of the walls is unknown. Many formations have sunk far into the earth, and are often completely overgrown.

== Purpose ==
The walls are fragmented and do not appear to be fences. They are not tall enough to provide defensive barriers. The East Bay Regional Park District calls them "rock walls". Livestock have grazed in the east and south Bay Area hills since the arrival of European settlers. Clearing land of scattered rocks would have eased the ability to move herds. Constructing walls would have helped to guide or corral the animals.

== Origin ==
No written documentation exists to identify when they were built, by whom, or why.

Due to their large extent and the time and manpower required to build them, the walls may have been built by the Ohlone.

Recent lichen testing suggests that they were built between 1850 and 1880, the early American era in California. European settlers could have built the walls using Chinese, Mexican, or Native American laborers.

== Locations ==
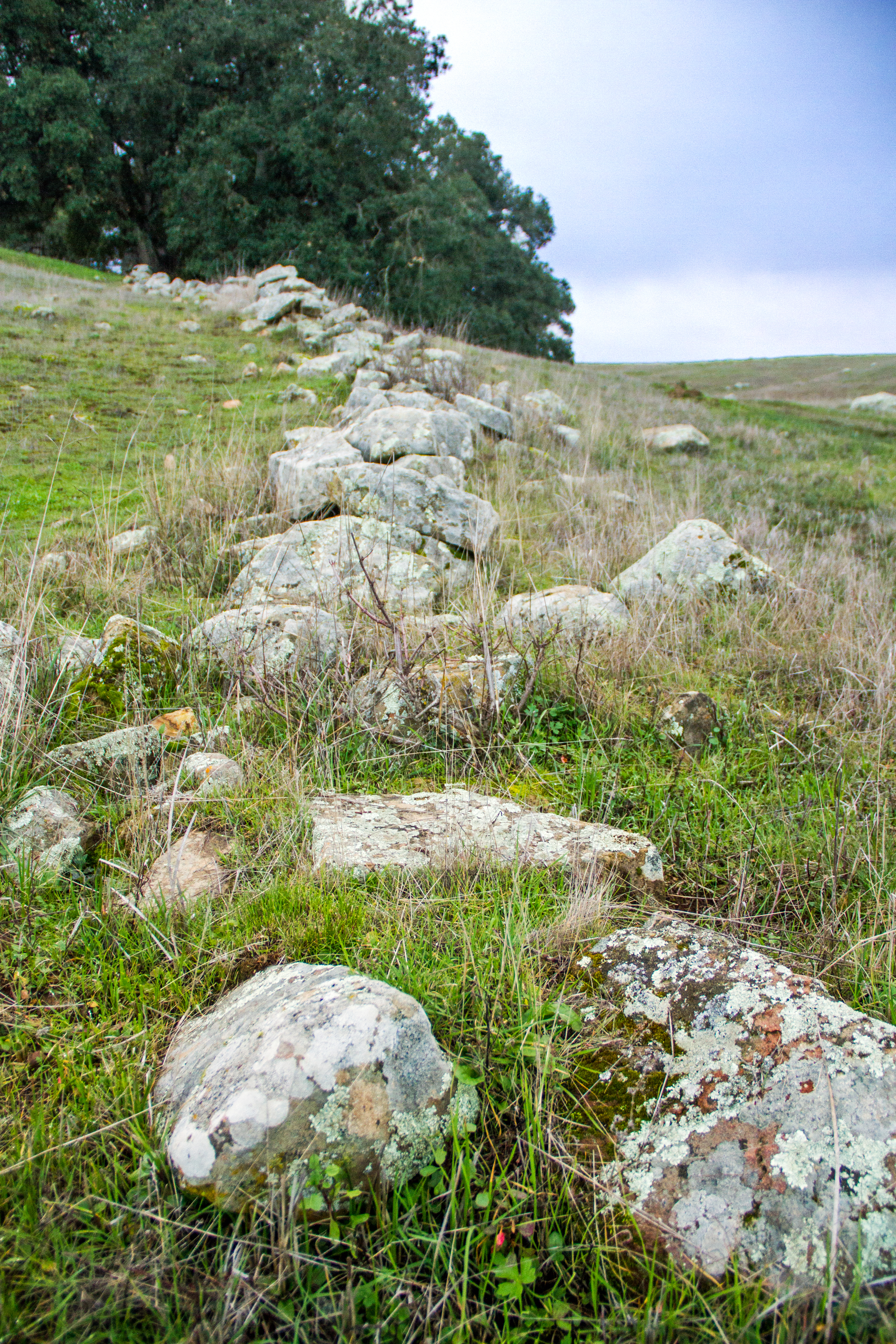
One of the many old stone walls that appear around the San Francisco Bay area. This one in the foothills of eastern Santa Clara County.

The stone walls are accessible in several area parks, including Ed R. Levin County Park in Santa Clara County and Mission Peak Regional Preserve in Alameda County.

As of 2016, archaeologist Jeffrey Fentress was measuring and mapping the walls to achieve protection from development or other destruction. Stone walls with unclear origin occur in other places near the San Francisco Bay.
