= Monument Peak (San Francisco Bay Area) =

Mountain in Santa Clara and Alameda county in California, United States

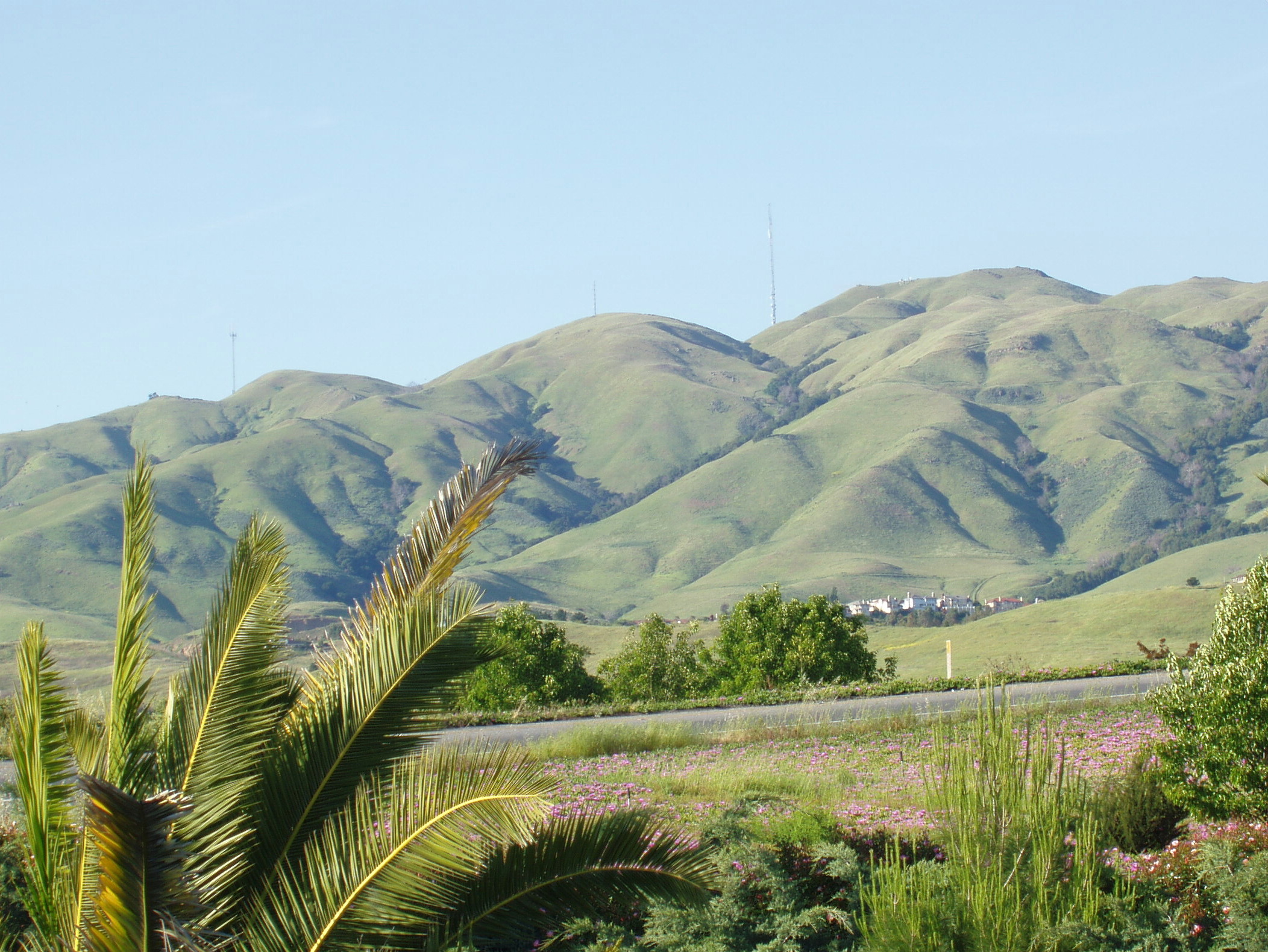

Highest point
- Elevation: 2,594 ft (791 m) NAVD 88
- Coordinates: 37°29′05″N 121°51′57″W

Geography
- Location within California
- Location: Diablo Range; Alameda−Santa Clara Counties, California
- Topo map: USGS Calaveras Reservoir

Climbing
- Easiest route: Hike

Monument Peak is a mountain peak located southeast of Fremont and northeast of Milpitas in the East Bay region of the San Francisco Bay Area in California.

== Geography ==
The mountain is part of a ridge in the Diablo Range that includes Mount Allison and Mission Peak and forms part of the border between Alameda County and Santa Clara County.

The summit of Monument Peak lies just within the southern boundary of Mission Peak Regional Preserve in Alameda County and can be reached from the south via trails originating in Ed R. Levin County Park or from the north via the Bay Area Ridge Trail.

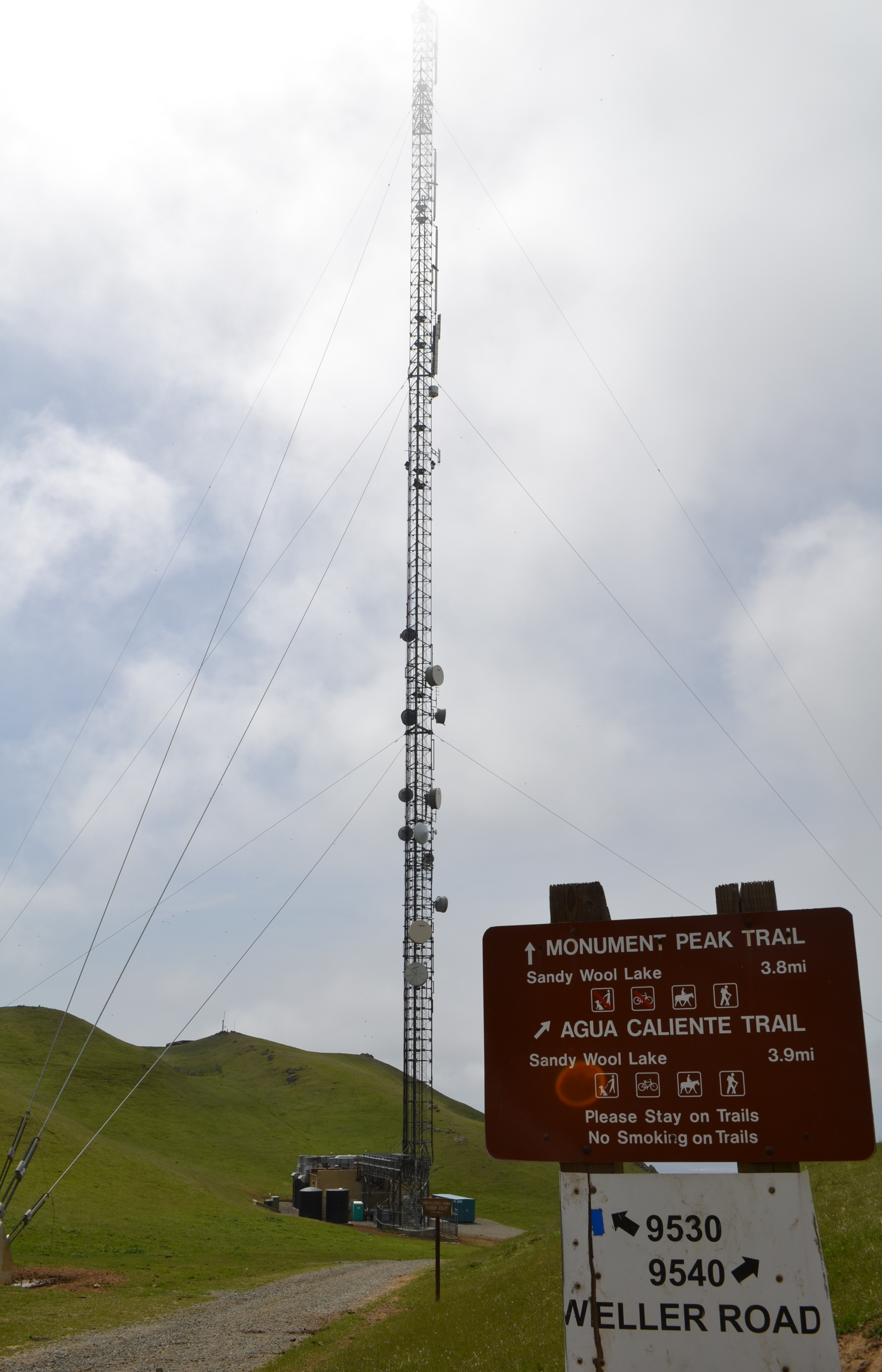
Monument Peak antenna, partially obscured by fog.

== Antenna ==
Built on July 1, 1988, an antenna on Monument Peak broadcasts channels 14 (KDTV), 26 (KTSF), 36 (KICU), and 48 (KSTS). It is a free-standing structure 605.2 feet (184.5 meters) above ground level. In the image above, the Monument Peak antenna is the tallest one seen (far right). The peak is the point directly right of the antenna. The antenna to the far left is on Mount Allison.
