= Mission Hills =

Mission Hills or Mission Hill may refer to:

== Places ==
=== Communities ===
In the United States (alphabetically by state)

- Mission Hills, Santa Barbara County, California, a town north of the city of Lompoc
- Mission Hills, Los Angeles, California, in the San Fernando Valley
- Mission Hills, San Diego, California, an old subdivision in north-central San Diego
- Mission Hills, Kansas, in Johnson County
- Mission Hill, Boston, Massachusetts, a residential neighborhood
- Mission Hill, South Dakota, a town in Yankton County
- Mission Hills, a neighborhood in west central El Paso, Texas

=== Golf courses ===
- Mission Hills Country Club, in Rancho Mirage, California
- Mission Hills Country Club (Kansas), in the Kansas City metropolitan area
- Mission Hills Golf Club, in Shenzhen, China
- Mission Hills Haikou, in the province of Hainan, China

=== Other places ===
- Mission Hill Family Estate, a wine grower and producer based in West Kelowna, British Columbia, Canada
- Mission Hills station, a station of the Shenzhen Metro in China

== Schools ==
- Bromsgrove School Mission Hills, in Shenzhen, China
- Mission Hill School, in the Jamaica Plain neighborhood of Boston, Massachusetts
- Mission Hills High School, in San Marcos, California

== Other uses ==
- Mission Hill (TV series), an American animated television series
- Mission Hills Star Trophy, an annual, pro-celebrity golf tournament held in Hainan, China

== See also ==
- Mission Mountain (disambiguation)
- Mission Peak, near Fremont, California
- Mission Ridge (disambiguation)
- Mission Terrace, in San Francisco, California
