= KDTV-DT =

Television station in San Francisco

- San Francisco–Oakland–; San Jose, California; United States
- City: San Francisco, California
- Channels: Digital: 20 (UHF), shared with KTSF; Virtual: 14
- Branding: Univision 14

Programming
- Affiliations: 14.1: Univision; 14.3: Great; 14.4: Ion Mystery

Ownership
- Owner: TelevisaUnivision; (KDTV License Partnership, GP)
- Sister stations: KFSF-DT, KBRG, KSOL, KSQL, KVVF, KVVZ

History
- First air date: August 13, 1975
- Former call signs: KDTV (1975–2009)
- Former channel numbers: Analog: 60 (UHF, 1975–1979), 14 (UHF, 1979–2009); Digital: 51 (UHF, until 2020)
- Former affiliations: SIN (1975–1987)

Technical information
- Licensing authority: FCC
- Facility ID: 33778
- ERP: 475 kW
- HAAT: 701.3 m (2,301 ft)
- Transmitter coordinates: 37°29′57″N 121°52′20″W
- Translator(s): KDTV-CD 28 (UHF) Santa Rosa; KFSF-DT 66.2 (34.2 UHF) Vallejo

Links
- Public license information: Public file; LMS
- Website: www.univision.com/local/san-francisco-kdtv

KDTV-DT (channel 14) is a television station licensed to San Francisco, California, United States, serving as the San Francisco Bay Area outlet for the Spanish-language network Univision. It is owned and operated by TelevisaUnivision alongside UniMás outlet KFSF-DT (channel 66). The two stations share studios at the Univision San Jose Broadcast Center on Zanker Road near the North San Jose Innovation District in San Jose; KDTV-DT's transmitter is located on Mount Allison in Fremont.

KDTV-CD (channel 28) in Santa Rosa operates as a Class A translator of KDTV relaying the station's signal into the northern half of the market; this station's transmitter is located atop Mount Saint Helena.

== History ==
Former logo, used until December 31, 2012.

The Bahía de San Francisco Television Company, owned by principals of the Spanish International Network including Rene Anselmo and Danny Villanueva, applied on July 20, 1973, for a construction permit to build a new television station on San Francisco's channel 60. The Federal Communications Commission (FCC) granted the application on November 13, 1974. Channel 60 had originally been assigned for noncommercial use in San Francisco, and KQED held a permit for it, but when that station accepted a gift from Metromedia of the facility for channel 32, the noncommercial reservation was switched to channel 32, changing channel 60 to commercial.

From studios on Palou Avenue in San Francisco and the former transmitting facilities of KBHK-TV on San Bruno Mountain, channel 60 made its debut on August 10, 1975. KDTV was the Bay Area's first full-time Spanish station; two other channels broadcast Spanish-language programs, KEMO (channel 20) and KGSC (channel 36).

KDTV did not remain on channel 60 for long. Desirous of a lower channel number, in early 1977, the station approached the College of San Mateo, which owned KCSM-TV, a small educational station in San Mateo. The trade, which the college approved that March, gave KDTV a lower channel number and KCSM-TV, then with anemic technical facilities, full-power coverage of the Bay Area and $400,000 in equipment. The swap took place on the morning of March 5, 1979.

It's a sad irony that it took a disaster for others to recognize our news department. We appreciate the attention, but we've been around for 10 years.

— Emilio Nicolas, Jr., on how the 1985 Mexico City earthquake caused others to notice KDTV's news efforts

The station grew in the 1980s with Emilio Nicolas Jr., son of Emilio Nicolas Sr., as general manager. Its relief efforts in the aftermath of the 1985 Mexico City earthquake won the station a Peabody Award and an Emmy nomination for community service, the first one for a Spanish-language TV station in the United States.

In 1997, prompted by the growing Hispanic population in the Bay Area and the need to expand, KDTV moved its studios and offices to the 41st floor of 50 Fremont Center in downtown San Francisco (today known as Salesforce West), a relocation that one Univision executive noted changed San Francisco from the worst facility in the network to its best. The station's current transmitter sites also took shape, with the opening of the then-KDTV-LP in Santa Rosa and the move of the main transmitter to Mount Allison that year. In 2001, Univision further expanded its Santa Rosa presence and opened an office there.

In 2016, the station moved into a new, state-of-the-art studio facility in San Jose to reduce the cost of doing business (which had become prohibitive in the city of San Francisco) and increase its focus on the expanding Hispanic population to the south in Santa Clara County. KDTV had previously maintained a bureau on Old Oakland Road. The station retains a smaller bureau in San Francisco covering news in the city, along with the northern and eastern portions of the region.

== News operation ==
The station's lone local programming at launch was an early evening local newscast. When Luis Echegoyén—who became one of KDTV's longtime anchors—arrived for an interview before the station launched in 1975, he instead found Anselmo painting a wall. In 1976, Enrique Gratas—later the anchor of Univision's network late news and Ocurrió Así on Telemundo—was named news director, being promoted to KMEX in 1978. His replacement, Guillermo Descalzi, later left KDTV for various SIN network posts, including head of the network's census registration program, national correspondent, and an eight-year stint as the host of Temas y Debates, the network's Sunday morning political program.

It was not until December 1996 that KDTV launched an 11 p.m. newscast. By 2000, the station's news ratings were on the rise and beating the English-language stations among younger viewers. In November 2007, KDTV had the highest-rated newscast in the Bay Area among adults 25 to 54 in the 6 p.m. timeslot. This was the first occurrence in the market in which a Spanish-language news program earned higher ratings than those of its English-language counterparts.

== Technical information ==
=== Subchannels ===
KDTV-DT broadcasts itself and KTSF from a transmitter facility on Mount Allison in Fremont. KDTV-DT and KDTV-CD broadcast Univision programming, with KDTV-CD additionally carrying two subchannels of KFSF-DT:

Subchannels of KDTV-DT and KTSF
License	Subchannel	Res.	Short name	Programming
KDTV-DT	14.1	720p	KDTV-HD	Univision
KDTV-DT	14.3	480i	GET	Great (4:3)
KDTV-DT	14.4	480i	Mystery	Ion Mystery
KTSF	26.1	720p	KTSF	Multicultural independent
KTSF	26.3	480i	26-3	Sino TV
KTSF	26.5	480i	Vietday	Viet Today TV

Subchannels of KDTV-CD
Subchannel	Res.	Short name	Programming
28.1	720p	KDTV-CD	Univision
28.2	720p	Unimas	UniMás (KFSF-DT)
28.3	480i	getTV	Great (4:3)
28.4	480i	Mystery	Ion Mystery
28.5	480i	Crime	True Crime Network (KFSF-DT)

Simulcast of subchannels of another station

=== Analog-to-digital conversion ===
KDTV shut down its analog signal, over UHF channel 14, on June 12, 2009, as part of the federally mandated transition from analog to digital television. The station's digital signal remained on its pre-transition UHF channel 51, using virtual channel 14.

After the 2016 incentive auction, multicultural independent station KTSF entered a channel sharing agreement with KDTV, after the station sold its spectrum in 2018.
