= Jan Hutchins =

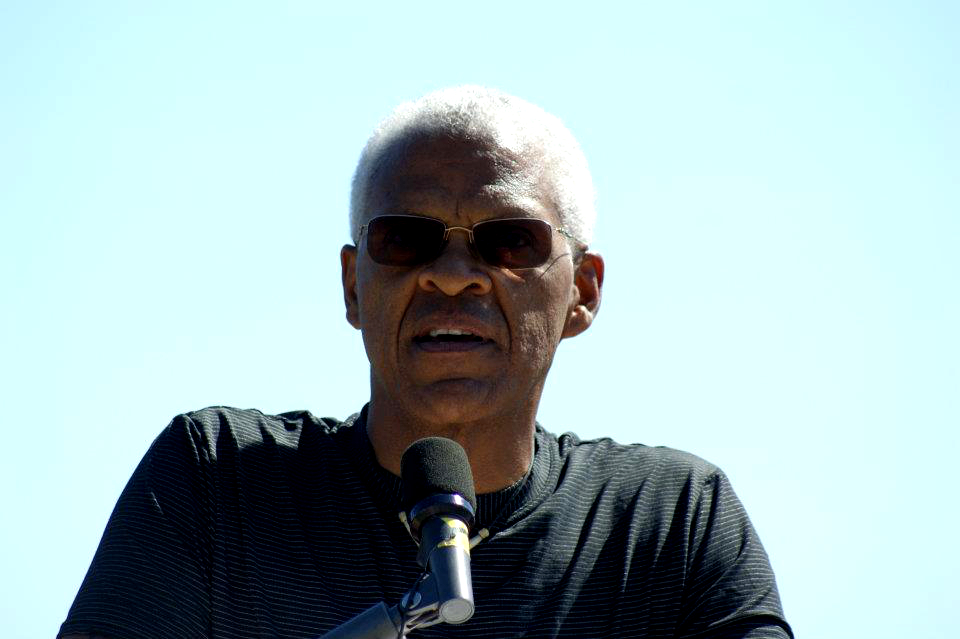
- Jan Hutchins
- Born: Jan Darwin Hutchins; 1949 (age 76–77); Danville, Illinois
- Education: Yale University
- Occupations: TV and radio journalist, Media consultant

Jan Darwin Hutchins (born 1949) is an American TV and radio journalist, producer and media consultant. Hutchins was born in Danville, Illinois and grew up in Ohio. He studied at Yale University, graduating with a B.A. in History in 1971. He started his career in 1972 as a sports journalist at the WIIC TV station in Pittsburgh, Pennsylvania. After moving to California, Hutchins worked from 1974 to 1990 as a sportscaster on the KPIX TV channel in San Francisco and at KRON (Channel 4). In 1981, he joined KICU (Channel 36) in San Jose when the San Francisco Bay Area independent television station initiated its news broadcasts, co-anchoring the prime time news program with Ysabel Duron until 1991. From 1993-1995, Hutchins served as the director of community development for the San Francisco Giants baseball team. He hosted sports, news and public affairs programs for San Francisco area radio stations (KGO, KCBS, KNBR) and from 1997 to 2000 worked at American Champion Media, which, along with KTEH-TV (Channel 54), produced "Adventures with Kanga Roddy", a children's television series about emotional intelligence that aired on PBS and starred Pat Morita, Jennifer Montana and Karen Lott. The show won Northern California Area EMMY Awards in 1999 and 2000. From 1996-1999 Hutchins served on the city council of Los Gatos, CA both as a vice-mayor and mayor and later founded a local yoga center. He lives currently in Tucson AZ where he works as a coach and mentor; enjoying retirement on the golf course. Divorced from Olga Kastrova, former business associate for five years.
