= KTSF =

Television station in San Francisco

- San Francisco–Oakland–San Jose, California; United States
- City: San Francisco, California
- Channels: Digital: 20 (UHF), shared with KDTV-DT; Virtual: 26
- Branding: KTSF 26

Programming
- Affiliations: 26.1: Multicultural Independent; for others, see § Subchannels

Ownership
- Owner: Lincoln Broadcasting Company, a California LP

History
- First air date: September 4, 1976
- Former call signs: KTSF-TV (1976–1981)
- Former channel numbers: Analog: 26 (UHF, 1976–2009); Digital: 27 (UHF, 2002–2018), 51 (UHF, 2018–2020)
- Call sign meaning: Television San Francisco

Technical information
- Licensing authority: FCC
- Facility ID: 37511
- ERP: 475 kW
- HAAT: 701.3 m (2,301 ft)
- Transmitter coordinates: 37°29′57″N 121°52′20″W

Links
- Public license information: Public file; LMS
- Website: ktsf.com

KTSF (channel 26) is an independent television station in San Francisco, California, United States, broadcasting in a variety of languages, most notably Chinese. The station is owned by the Lincoln Broadcasting Company and maintains studios on Valley Drive in south suburban Brisbane. It shares a channel and transmitter with KDTV-DT (channel 14), owned by Univision, broadcasting from atop Mount Allison.

Channel 26 was approved in 1965 but did not begin broadcasting until September 1976. It was owned by Lillian Lincoln Howell and, aside from a short-lived daily business show at launch and four years of prime time subscription television programming in the early 1980s, primarily broadcast alternative English-language syndicated and local programs as well as brokered programs in languages other than English, primarily serving the Bay Area's growing Asian community.

In 1989, KTSF began producing the first Chinese-language television newscast in the United States, airing in Cantonese and Mandarin Chinese. In addition to local news, KTSF produces other local programs in Chinese and English and airs Chinese-language entertainment programming, several independently produced shows catering to the Indian and Iranian communities, paid programs, and religious broadcasting.

== History ==
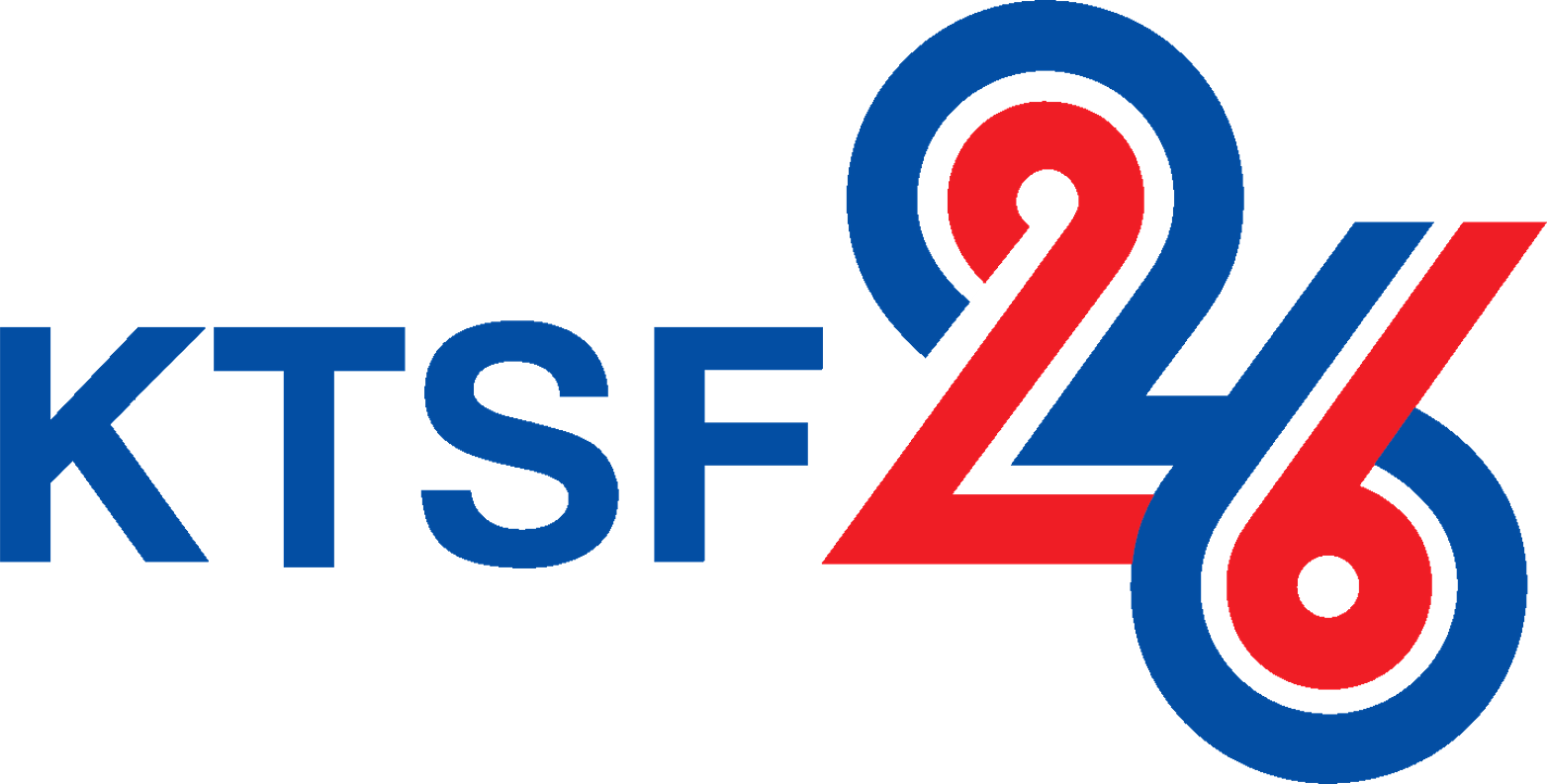
Former logo of KTSF, used until December 2016

=== Construction ===
Interest in San Francisco's ultra high frequency (UHF) channel 26 had been sporadic in the 1950s and early 1960s. Plaza Radio and Television Company applied for the channel and received a construction permit in 1956. No station emerged, and in 1962, another group filed for the channel: Automated Electronics, Inc. The company, based in Dallas, attempted to start stations in Dallas, San Francisco, and other cities carrying business news information, but its assets were purchased in late 1963 by Ultrasonic Research and Testing Laboratories, which had no broadcasting operations.

Television San Francisco applied for channel 26 on February 13, 1964, and was granted a construction permit on November 29, 1966. The firm was a venture of Lillian Lincoln Banta and Deane Devere Banta, the latter of whom had worked in front of and behind the cameras at KOVR in Stockton. When Lincoln, a daughter of Arizona multimillionaire John C. Lincoln, divorced Deane Banta, she kept the rights to channel 26 and changed her name back to Lillian Lincoln Howell. In 1973, Lincoln applied for subscription television (STV) authority for channel 26. Meanwhile, the channel lay fallow, and KTSF-TV continued to exist only on paper, holding rights to begin broadcasting from the new Sutro Tower. However, the new station was instead built on San Bruno Mountain; Howell had been pushed out in the process of setting up the new facility.

=== Early years and subscription television ===
KTSF began broadcasting on September 4, 1976. The station offered business news programming during the day under a single show; the show, Your Business World, was underpromoted and had no ratings surveys, and it was canceled before the end of the year. In February 1977, after paying KEMO-TV (channel 20) to withdraw its application, KTSF won the right to broadcast subscription programming in the Bay Area. However, it was the station's diverse programs in languages other than English that comprised most of channel 26's broadcast day. In 1978, these included a Japanese cooking program; the Bay Area's only weekly hour of Korean-language programming; shows in Chinese curated by Leo Chen, a professor at San Francisco State University, who later headed KWBB (channel 38); and Italian first-division soccer. KEMO and KTSF, along with KDTV of the Spanish International Network, offered most of the region's non-English television programming. In 1980, Fuji TV of Japan moved its programming from KEMO-TV, where it had debuted in 1972, when James Gabbert acquired channel 20 and changed it to a general-entertainment independent station; on channel 26, Fuji TV joined Tokyo TV.

In English, channel 26 offered such programs as Videowest, a weekly magazine-type program focusing on niche subcultures; professional wrestling; classic movies and reruns; and a weekday women's program, Top of the Town, which was broadcast from the top of the Union Square Hyatt. In 1977, Sam Speer began doing daily horse racing reports on channel 26. One local program, The World of Gems, was canceled when a federal judge sentenced its two hosts—both convicted felons—for illegally possessing weapons.

Subscription Television of America acquired the rights to broadcast subscription service on KTSF in May 1979 by purchasing 90 percent of KTSF's STV franchisee from the original holder, Pay Television Corporation. The long-promised and planned subscription television programming came to channel 26 on August 12, 1980, in the form of Super Time, Subscription Television of America's local service. From 7 p.m. until early morning hours, the station would broadcast a lineup consisting primarily of movies only to paying Super Time subscribers. Despite little promotion, Super Time had signed up 2,500 subscribers by the end of August.

However, subscription TV on KTSF had a rocky and short history. In September 1981, Super Time was purchased by Satellite Television and Associated Resources (STAR), which had been operating the STV system on the new-to-air KSTS in San Jose; by June 1982, the San Francisco system, rebranded Star TV, had 24,000 subscribers. STAR soon faced financial difficulties of its own, having previously exhausted its bank lines. On January 4, 1983, the general manager of Star TV in San Francisco informed his 70 employees that it would be acquired by Willamette Subscription Television of Portland, Oregon, which had been operating an ON TV–branded service on KECH-TV serving that city; at the time, the company was losing 750 customers a month, and the general manager reported that a Chapter 11 bankruptcy filing was imminent. However, by March, the company was still trying to sell the operation; in April, STAR filed for Chapter 7 bankruptcy and was liquidated.

=== Growing Asian programming ===
By 1983, KTSF's program lineup outside of STV hours consisted of paid religious programs in the morning, some syndicated programs, and foreign-language programming during daytime and weekend hours. External producers continued to provide the latter: in 1982, KTSF had three Chinese-language producers and two Japanese-language producers on its air. The subscription service, rebranded Select TV, collapsed during the course of 1984; its owner, Vision Entertainment, filed for Chapter 11 bankruptcy that May, and KTSF was allowed to take the service off the air by a bankruptcy judge that November. The end of subscription television on channel 26 allowed for the return of prime time Chinese-language telecasting, with Haihua TV and Chunghwa TV programming in prime time and three other companies offering other programs. Haihua had previously been on channel 26 prior to the launch of Super Time, moving to KEMO and then to KSTS before returning.

During the decade, KTSF adjusted its mix of Asian programming to reflect changing dynamics in the Bay Area. In 1982, it introduced its first Filipino-language programs, followed three years later by Vietnamese-language programming. Asian Journal, a weekly public affairs series rotating between issues of concern to different Asian-American communities in the Bay Area, debuted in 1985. The station also continued to offer brokered programming in other languages, such as Italian; Silvana Marzetti, who programmed two hours a week in Italian on channel 26, noted that her programming lacked the strong corporate sponsorship that was characterizing the shows in Japanese and Chinese as well as their growing audience base.

As revenues soared for KTSF's foreign-language programming beginning in 1985, some of the shows became profitable, as did the station itself. The money was used to consolidate offices split between China Basin and San Bruno Mountain at a new site in Brisbane, a southern suburb. Alternative programming in English also continued. In 1987, Sam Speer's horse racing reports, which had aired for a time on KCSM-TV, moved from KSTS back to KTSF after many Bay Area cable systems dropped the former station. The station also broadcast programming from the California Music Channel music video service.

A significant step in the station's history came in 1987 when it hired a research firm to detail the consumer habits of the Chinese-American community in the Bay Area. At the time, Lincoln Howell was still the primary funder of channel 26's operations. The study demonstrated to mainstream U.S. companies that the market behaved like most other groups. For instance, the major grocery store chains were patronized by 92 percent of Chinese-Americans on a weekly basis. This ran counter to the prevailing attitude from advertisers, which was summarized by station manager Mike Sherman: "Why should I advertise my supermarket on TV when all the Chinese are going to do is go down to Chinatown and buy a chicken on a string?" The study also noted that KTSF was Chinese Americans' primary source of news and information. Moves like these to dispel stereotypes, as well as the launch of Chinese-language local newscasts in 1989, helped increase the station's ability to attract major advertisers: in 1994, KTSF earned 60 percent of its revenue from advertising compared to 35 percent from brokering airtime. This came as channel 26 received competition from KCNS (channel 38) and KPST-TV (channel 66), which both offered large lineups of Asian programming and, in the case of KPST, locally produced Chinese news.

In 1997, KTSF's programming efforts in Filipino and Vietnamese experienced turmoil. In February, the station cut back the air time of the Filipino-language Filipino Report after less than two years to replace it with the ABS-CBN current affairs magazine Balitang K, which had a tabloid format; two journalists at KTSF resigned in protest, and community leaders threatened a boycott. The fired reporters then started a 30-minute program airing on KMTP-TV (channel 32). Later that year, after a 10-year run, KTSF discontinued its airing of the independently produced local program Vietnamese Liberty Television after it claimed the producer had breached confidentiality in business negotiations and defamed channel 26's management. Beginning by 1997, the Japanese TV show Iron Chef, produced by Fuji TV, gained a cult following in the Bay Area during its broadcasts on KTSF. When Fuji TV stopped subtitling the program into English in August 1998, an uproar ensued, and the program—dubbed into English—ended up on the Food Network the next year. The series continued airing on KTSF until the station exhausted the remaining new episodes of the program, which was canceled in 1999.

KTSF's efforts to broaden its advertiser appeal continued in the 1990s and 2000s, as the Asian-American population in the Bay Area experienced further growth. In 2000, the station had total revenue of $12.5 million, more than doubling from four years prior. Channel 26's major advertisers included such blue-chip names as AT&T, Bank of America, Disney, JCPenney, Nissan, and United Airlines. In 2005, KTSF became the first Asian-language station to be rated by Nielsen Media Research.

Lillian Lincoln Howell continued to be involved in the station well into her eighties, still attending weekly meetings in spite of slowly losing her hearing. She died in 2014 at the age of 93.

In the 2000s, KTSF experimented with several new types of local productions. Talk Tonight, a call-in program originally hosted by Orlando Shih, debuted in 2000. KTSF also trialed several series aimed at younger audiences. In 2003, it marketed Road Trip USA, a Mandarin-language reality game show in which four Chinese teams would race from Boston to Miami; a year later, channel 26 debuted Stir, an English-language program.

KTSF lost its Japanese-language programming between 2011 and 2014. In April 2011, Tokyo TV left KTSF and moved to a subchannel of KCNS and later KEXT-CD (channel 27). In March 2014, Fuji TV discontinued its relationship with KTSF after more than 33 years; KTSF's programming director cited competition with online platforms, declining viewership, and low advertising revenue.

=== Digital TV, channel-sharing, and streaming ===
KTSF's digital signal launched on May 1, 2002, broadcast on UHF channel 27. The station ended regular programming on its analog signal, over UHF channel 26, on June 12, 2009, as part of the federally mandated transition from analog to digital television. The station's digital signal remained on its pre-transition UHF channel 27, using virtual channel 26. As part of the SAFER Act, KTSF kept its analog signal on the air until June 26 to inform viewers of the digital television transition through a loop of public service announcements from the National Association of Broadcasters. Despite converting to digital, KTSF only began broadcasting high-definition programming on February 1, 2016.

In 2014, KTSF launched a local TV app in the Apple App Store and Google Play Store, using the Syncbak platform as well as Nielsen measurement. The original app was discontinued on February 1, 2021, and replaced with the VUit platform (now renamed Zeam). VUit was the successor to Syncbak, which had been acquired by Gray Television. In 2021, KTSF was the most-viewed station on VUit, attracting out-of-market viewership in a number of other West Coast media markets. The station launched a promotional campaign in 2023 to raise awareness of its availability among Chinese-Americans in the Sacramento area.

Lincoln Broadcasting took a payment of more than $90.1 million to surrender its channel in the reverse portion of the 2016 United States wireless spectrum auction. This was the third-highest payment to any San Francisco–market TV station. In the wake of the auction, KTSF entered into a channel-sharing agreement with Univision-owned KDTV-DT (channel 14), which broadcasts from Mount Allison. KDTV began broadcasting KTSF's subchannels on May 7, 2018. The KDTV–KTSF multiplex was then repacked from physical channel 51 to channel 20 on April 29, 2020.

== Programming ==
KTSF's broadcast day, outside of hours when it airs infomercials and other paid programming (which dominate on weekends), predominantly consists of Chinese-language news and entertainment programs, both from China and locally produced. It also airs international newscasts and several specialty programs in languages other than Chinese. KTSF's non-multicultural broadcasting is limited to several religious programs, including Shepherd's Chapel and two weekly Catholic Masses.

KTSF's local non-news programs in Chinese include Talk Finance with Sau Wing Lam, Wok Around the Bay, KTSF Music, and Bay Area Focus with Lily Chao. The station also airs several independently produced local shows including India Waves Network, in English and Hindi, and Nima TV, in Farsi.

=== News operation ===
KTSF launched its news department on February 6, 1989, with the debut of Chinese News at Nine as the first live local Chinese-language TV newscast in the United States. The program was originally presented by Mei-Ling Sze, formerly of TVB in Hong Kong, and Philip Choi, also of Hong Kong. Sze, who had recently emigrated from Hong Kong, was working as a bank teller when she was approached to help start KTSF's newsroom. The entire news department consisted of ten employees; content for the news program came from Asian TV channels, CNN, and KRON-TV, which also sold one of its newsgathering vehicles to channel 26. It replaced programming from programmer Overseas Chinese Communication (OCTV), which moved to KWBB (channel 38). The first edition was later selected for inclusion in the Paley Center for Media catalog. In March, the station added a live audio simulcast in Mandarin on local radio station KEST.

We got people calling up in tears, they were so upset. And they wouldn't hang up. They just wanted to talk to someone and express their feelings. They hoped we understood, and we did. For them, we aren't just a television station; we are part of the community.

— Mei-Ling Sze, anchor for KTSF's Cantonese news, on the viewer reaction to Tiananmen Square

The newscast proved its value quickly. During the Tiananmen Square protests and massacre later in 1989, the station was able to track down Fang Lizhi, an activist, before he sought asylum; news outlets around the world picked up the story. By early 1990, the newscast had 240,000 viewers a night. The Cantonese newscast was extended to an hour in duration in October 1993. The next year, the station launched a separate Mandarin news program; over the course of the 1990s, KTSF's research found the number of Mandarin speakers slowly pulling even with the Cantonese-speaking population, largely driven by the technology sector fueling immigration to San Jose. By 1993, the newscasts had moved to the 8 p.m. hour. Weekend editions of the Mandarin and Cantonese broadcasts debuted in early 2006.

In 2016, KTSF launched a Cantonese-language morning news program; by 2023, this had been replaced with reruns of the previous evening's 7 and 10 p.m. newscasts. The Mandarin news at 10 p.m. was revamped in 2023 with the inclusion of several new segments and a weekly sports segment. In addition to the Cantonese and Mandarin newscasts, KTSF produces Hong Kong Weekly, a weekend roundup of the week's news from Hong Kong.

In addition to its own Chinese-language newscasts, KTSF airs international newscasts from or covering Asian countries including China News (China Central Television), ETTV News (Taiwan), Saigon TV News (Vietnamese), and TV Patrol (Philippines).

== Subchannels ==
KTSF offers four subchannels on the multiplex shared with KDTV-DT:

Subchannels of KDTV-DT and KTSF
License	Subchannel	Res.	Short name	Programming
KDTV-DT	14.1	720p	KDTV-HD	Univision
KDTV-DT	14.3	480i	GET	Great (4:3)
KDTV-DT	14.4	480i	Mystery	Ion Mystery
KTSF	26.1	720p	KTSF	Multicultural independent
KTSF	26.3	480i	26-3	Sino TV
KTSF	26.5	480i	Vietday	Viet Today TV
