= Mount Allison =

Mountain in California, United States

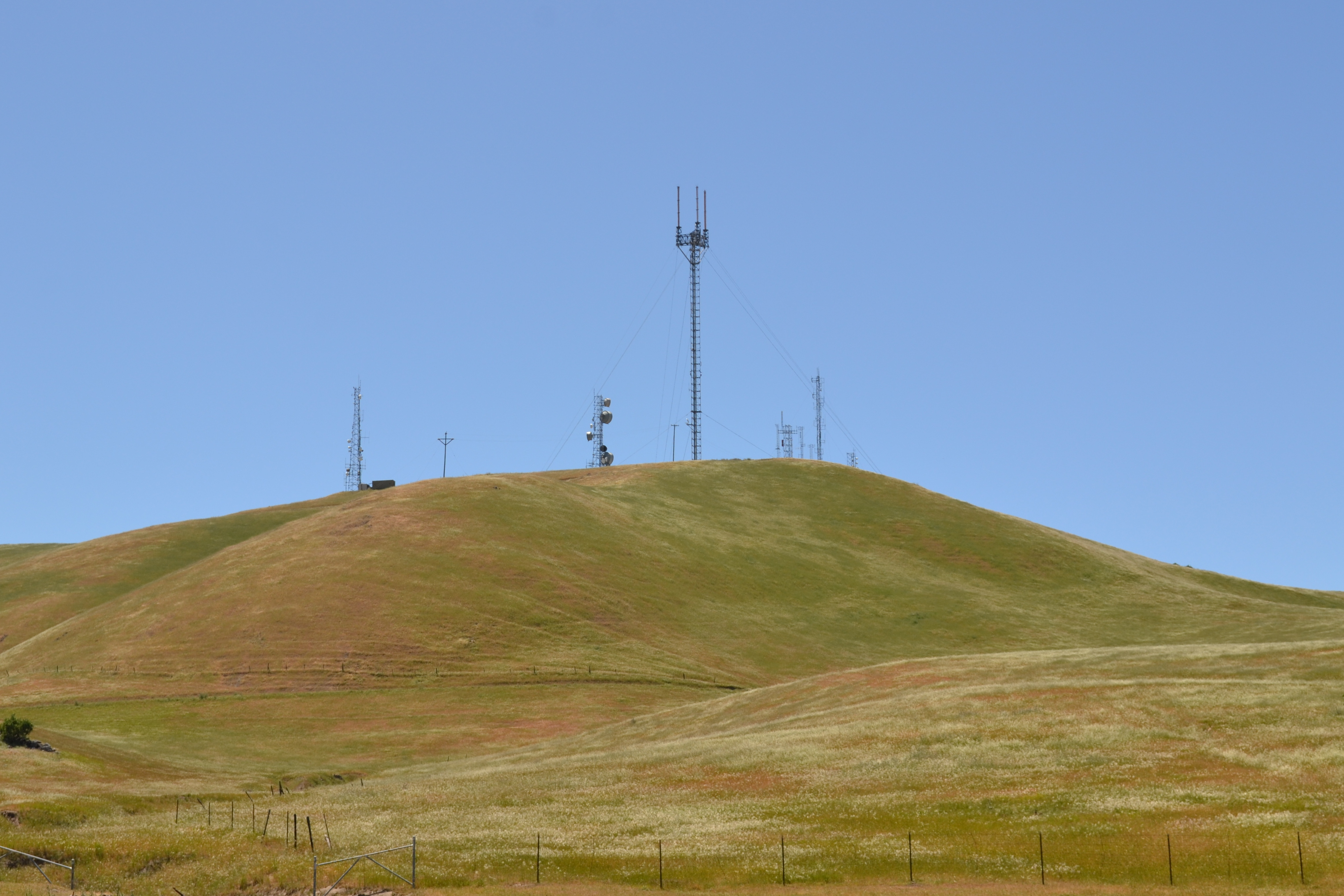
- from the east

Highest point
- Elevation: 2,664 ft (812 m) NAVD 88
- Coordinates: 37°29′56″N 121°52′17″W

Geography
- Location within California
- Location: Alameda County, California, U.S.
- Parent range: Diablo Range
- Topo map: USGS Calaveras Reservoir

Mount Allison is a peak of the Diablo Range, located in the East Bay southeast of Fremont, California.

== Geography ==
Mount Allison is part of a ridge that also includes Mission Peak and Monument Peak. Unlike those other two peaks, Mount Allison is located on unincorporated private property owned by a broadcasting company.

== Broadcasting antennas ==
Owned by Communication and Control, Inc. (CCI), a large free-standing broadcasting antenna on Mount Allison broadcasts two Spanish channels, channel 14 (Univision KDTV) and channel 48 (Telemundo KSTS). Erected on February 25, 1998, the antenna is 443 feet (135 m) high and has three prongs at the top. Several smaller towers and dishes are also present.

KTSF has relocated its transmitters to Mount Allison on May 7, 2018, previously located atop San Bruno Mountain. KTLN-TV and KAXT-CD relocated their transmitters to Mount Allison on June 1, 2018, previously located atop Mount Burdell.
