= KFSF-DT =

Television station in Vallejo, California

- Vallejo–San Francisco–Oakland–; San Jose, California; United States
- City: Vallejo, California
- Channels: Digital: 34 (UHF); Virtual: 66
- Branding: UniMás 66

Programming
- Affiliations: 66.1: UniMás; 66.2: Univision; for others, see § Subchannels

Ownership
- Owner: TelevisaUnivision; (UniMas San Francisco LLC)
- Sister stations: KDTV-DT, KBRG, KSOL, KSQL, KVVF, KVVZ

History
- First air date: November 25, 1986
- Former call signs: KPST-TV (1986–2002); KFSF (2002–2003); KFSF-TV (2004–2009)
- Former channel numbers: Analog: 66 (UHF, 1986–2009)
- Former affiliations: Asian Independent/HSN (1986–2002)
- Call sign meaning: Telefutura San Francisco

Technical information
- Licensing authority: FCC
- Facility ID: 51429
- ERP: 370 kW
- HAAT: 498 m (1,634 ft)
- Transmitter coordinates: 37°45′19″N 122°27′10″W
- Translator(s): KDTV-CD 28.2 Santa Rosa

Links
- Public license information: Public file; LMS
- Website: UniMás

KFSF-DT (channel 66) is a television station licensed to Vallejo, California, United States, broadcasting the Spanish-language UniMás network to the San Francisco Bay Area. It is owned and operated by TelevisaUnivision alongside San Francisco–licensed Univision outlet KDTV-DT (channel 14). The two stations share studios at the Univision San Jose Broadcast Center on Zanker Road near the North San Jose Innovation District in San Jose; KFSF-DT's transmitter is located atop Sutro Tower in San Francisco.

== History ==
The station first signed on the air on November 25, 1986, as KPST-TV. Founded by Millbrae-based Pan Pacific Television Inc., it originally maintained a part-time independent station format, consisting of a three-hour block of Mandarin language programming during prime time each night and programming from the Home Shopping Network (HSN) filling the remaining 20 hours of its daily schedule.

However, from the start, other companies competed for the Channel 66 license, even after Pan Pacific Television was awarded it by the Federal Communications Commission (FCC). The most fervent competitor was Silver King Broadcasting, the broadcasting arm of HSN, which vied for the license for ten years after the station's sign-on. Shortly before KPST made its formal debut, Silver King announced that it would acquire the license. The deal was stalled for years until alleged improprieties by Pan Pacific cracked open the door for Silver King to try and take over the license. In 1989, the FCC opened an investigation into Pan Pacific Television over allegations that it intentionally declined to disclose its ownership by Chinese investors on its application, in violation of agency rules restricting foreign companies from maintaining an ownership interest in an American broadcast television or radio property higher than 25%.

With the likelihood that the company would have to undergo a hearing by the FCC Commissioner's Board regarding the issue, Pan Pacific also realized that the station was ripe for a possible takeover by other prospective licensees, citing a federal law that permitted minority-owned firms to be able to purchase local broadcast media properties that were under FCC investigation at a discount bid. The company chose to sell the KPST license to Channel 66 of Vallejo, a company founded by veteran media executive Barry Diller (who is Caucasian) and businessman Edward Whitehead (who is African American), the latter of whom held a 51% controlling interest in the company.

However, shortly after the transaction occurred, the District of Columbia Court of Appeals ruled that the FCC's rules giving preferential treatment to companies owned by minorities to allow them to acquire licenses under agency investigation were unconstitutional. As a result, the FCC rejected Whitehead's application. However, even though the U.S. Supreme Court decided to uphold the ruling by the D.C. Appeals Court when the case regarding the purchase discounts for minority firms was brought to a hearing in 1990, Whitehead and Diller chose to submit their application to the FCC once again. However, San Francisco–based West Coast United Broadcasting Co.; Arthur Liu of New York City–based Multicultural Radio Broadcasting Inc. and a consortium between Tennessee-based Pen Holdings Inc. and San Jose developer John S. Wong each filed petitions objecting to the sale. West Coast United Broadcasting subsequently filed a competing application to the FCC, in doing so filing a challenge to Diller and Whitehead's argument that they had full rights to purchase the station.

=== Silver King/USA Broadcasting ownership ===
The dispute over the license was eventually resolved in late 1995, when the Whitehead-Diller partnership reached an out-of-court settlement for an undisclosed sum, in which West Coast Broadcasting agreed to rescind its application and allow Whitehead and Diller to purchase the station. In addition, Diller's company, Silver King Communications, agreed to the reimburse the legal fees incurred by the three petitioners (with Wong and Pen receiving up to $268,000, West Coast Broadcasting receiving up to $17,000 and Liu receiving up to $28,960), in exchange for each of the parties dropping their legal challenges.

On February 15, 1996, the Whitehead-Diller partnership was given permission by the FCC to acquire KPST-TV for $9 million (below the station's appraisal value of $12 million). Silver King's involvement in the deal gave the company an additional television station property as Diller had earlier announced on November 27, 1995, that he would acquire the Home Shopping Network and Silver King Broadcasting, which owned HSN-affiliated stations in several other larger media markets. Two years later in 1997, Silver King purchased the USA Network and renamed its broadcast television subsidiary as USA Broadcasting, as part of a corporate rebranding borrowing from the identity of its new cable channel property.

In June 1998, USA Broadcasting launched a customized independent station format, "CityVision", which infused syndicated programming—including a few produced by sister production unit Studios USA that also aired nationally on USA Network—with a limited amount of local entertainment and magazine programs (reminiscent of the format used by CITY-TV in Toronto and more prominently, that station's sister broadcast television properties that became charter stations of Citytv, when CHUM Limited expanded the format to other Canadian markets as a television system in 2002). At the time the concept formally launched on Miami sister station WAMI-TV in September of that year (later expanding to sister stations WHOT-TV in Atlanta, KSTR-TV in Dallas–Fort Worth and WHUB-TV in Boston), USA Broadcasting had not announced plans for KPST to switch to adopt the format.

=== Sale to Univision ===
In the summer of 2000, USA Networks announced that it would sell its television station group, in order to focus on its cable network and television production properties. Among the prospective buyers for the USA Broadcasting unit was The Walt Disney Company—which had acquired ABC in 1996—which was the original frontrunner to purchase the thirteen-station group (had Disney been successful in acquiring the station, such a deal would have made KPST a sister station to KGO-TV (channel 7), one of ABC's five original owned-and-operated stations). However, Spanish-language broadcaster Univision Communications beat out Disney and the competing bidders in a close race, securing a deal to purchase the USA Broadcasting stations for $1.1 billion on December 7, 2000. But because of the station's joint ownership structure, Whitehead and USA Networks had to sell their respective stakes in KPST to Univision; USA sold its 49% minority interest in the station for $37 million, while Whitehead sold his 51% share for $42 million. The sale to Univision faced opposition from a coalition of Bay Area residents of Chinese origin and San Francisco city supervisor Leland Yee, who each filed a complaint to the FCC over the sale. The FCC chose to approve the Univision acquisition, effectively allowing KPST to form a duopoly with Univision owned-and-operated station KDTV (channel 14).

The week prior to the sale's completion, on May 15, 2001, Univision Communications announced during its upfront presentation that it would launch a secondary television network—later announced to be named TeleFutura (the forerunner of UniMás) on July 31—that would compete with Univision, Telemundo and the then-recently launched Azteca América. Univision would utilize the former USA Broadcasting stations to serve as charter outlets of the network, which would cater to bilingual Latinos and young adult males between the ages 18 and 34 that seldom watch Spanish language television other than sporting events. Univision, however, continued to maintain English-language programming formats on the nine HSN affiliates and four independent stations it acquired from USA Networks for fourteen months following the completion of the purchase, with KPST continuing to air HSN and Mandarin language programming.

Channel 66 officially converted into a Spanish-language station on January 14, 2002, when it became an owned-and-operated station of TeleFutura, which initially launched on that date on 18 Univision-owned stations (including eleven of its large-market sister stations under USA Broadcasting ownership); the station accordingly changed its call letters to KFSF (for "Telefutura San Francisco") on that date.

On December 3, 2012, Univision Communications announced that it would relaunch TeleFutura as UniMás—which loosely translates to "Univision Plus", to underline its ties to its parent network Univision—refocusing its programming to appeal towards Latino males between the ages of 12 and 35 years old. The rebranding took place on January 7, 2013.

== Technical information ==
=== Subchannels ===
The station's signal is multiplexed:

Subchannels of KFSF-DT
Subchannel	Res.	Short name	Programming
66.1	720p	KFSF-HD	UniMás
66.2	720p	KDTV-HD	Univision (KDTV-DT)
66.3	480i	MSGold	MovieSphere Gold
66.4	480i	Grit	Grit
66.5	480i	TrueCri	True Crime Network
66.6	480i	BT2	Infomercials

Simulcast of subchannels of another station
Subchannel broadcast with MPEG-4 video

=== Analog-to-digital conversion ===
KFSF shut down its analog signal, over UHF channel 66, on June 12, 2009, as part of the federally mandated transition from analog to digital television. The station's digital signal remained on its pre-transition UHF channel 34, using virtual channel 66.
