= Ed R. Levin County Park =

Largest park in Milpitas, California

Coordinates: 37.466604°N 121.856900°W

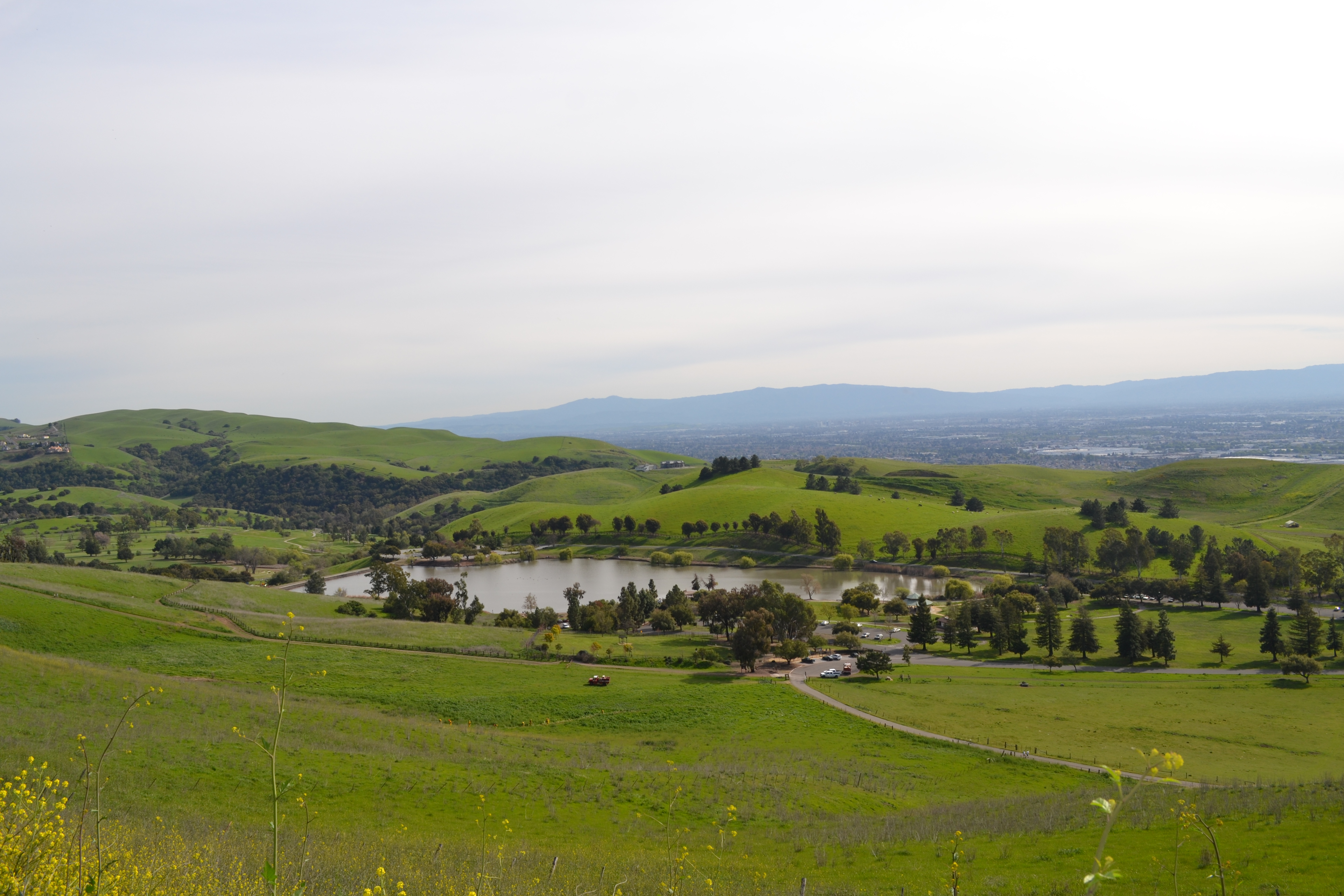
- A view of the Ed R. Levin County Park and Sandy Wool Lake from Agua Caliente Trail

- Location within California
- Type: landscape garden
- Location: Milpitas, California
- Area: Santa Clara County Parks and Recreation Department
- Operator: Santa Clara County Parks and Recreation Department

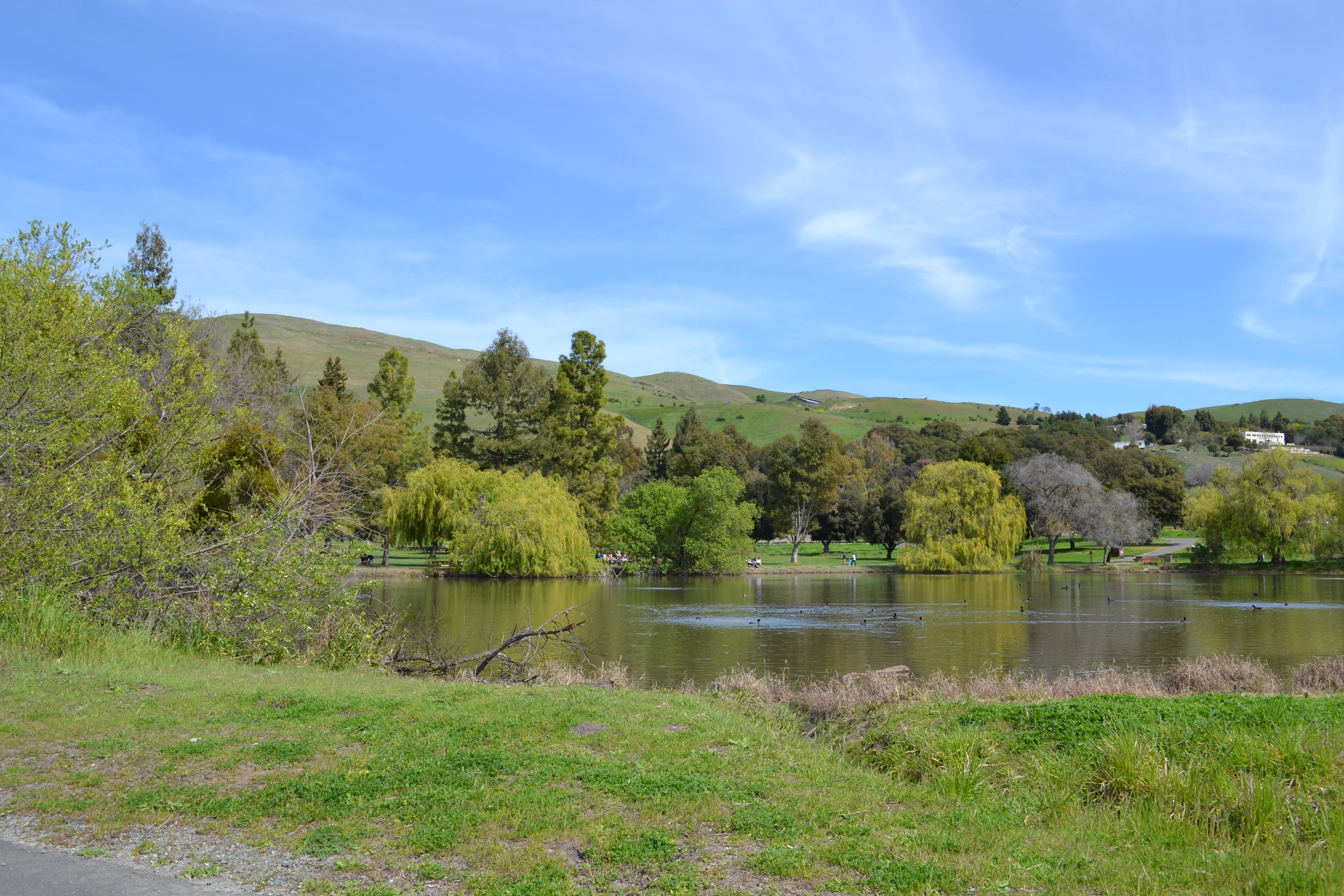
Spring Valley Pond

Ed R. Levin County Park is the largest park in Milpitas, California. It is run by the Santa Clara County Parks and Recreation Department and is located in the chaparral and grassland foothills of the Diablo Range east of the Santa Clara Valley. Monument Peak can be accessed through trails in the park. The park's recreational facilities include a hang gliding and paragliding area, a dog park, and horseback riding areas. Ed R. Levin County Park has two lakes, Sandy Wool Lake and Spring Valley Pond, both are reservoirs which collect runoff water from the hills to the east. It is home to some of the East Bay Walls, low stone walls of unknown origin. The park is named after open space advocate and Santa Clara County 3rd District Supervisor Edgar R. Levin (1908–1965).

== Gallery ==
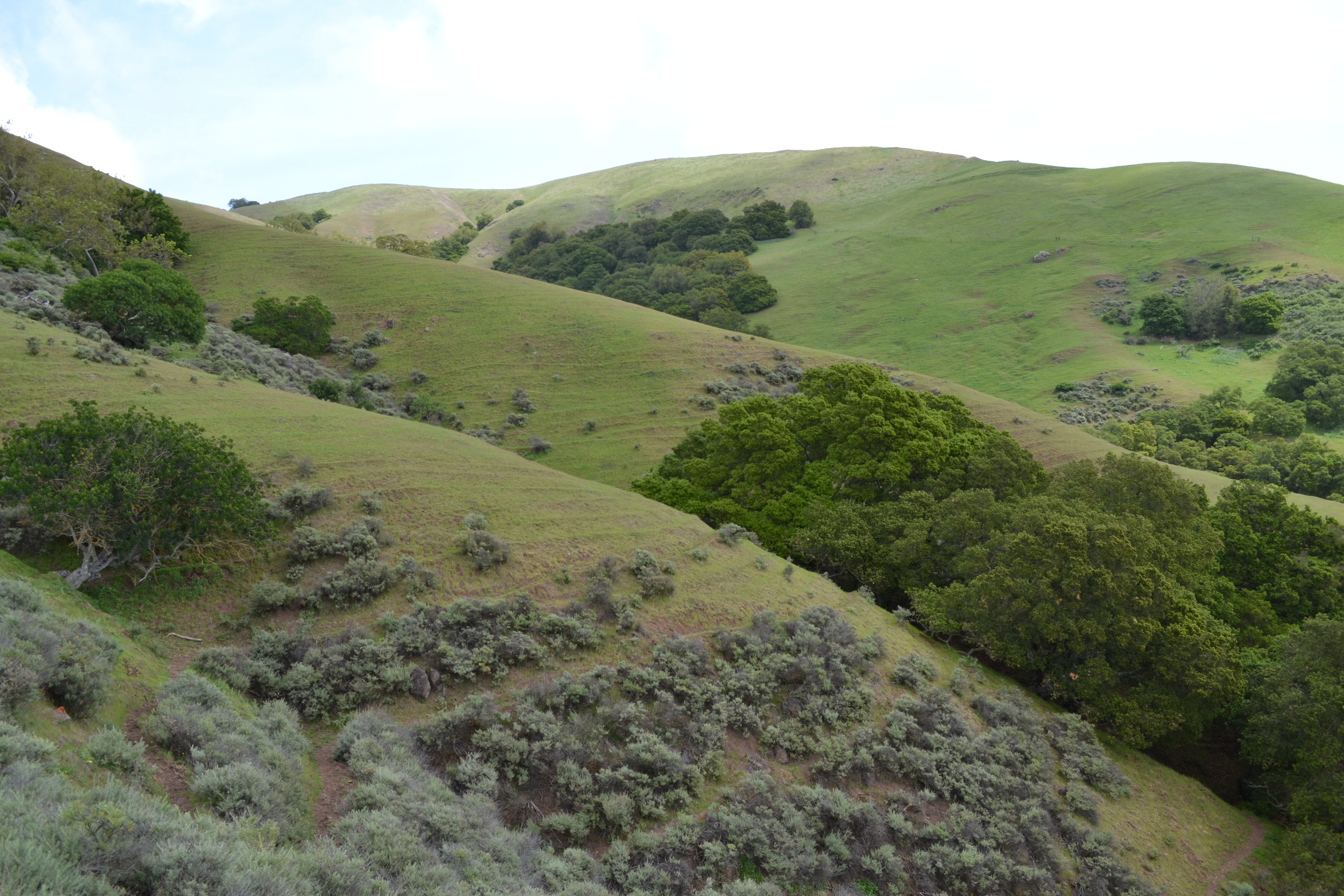
Diablo Range in the park

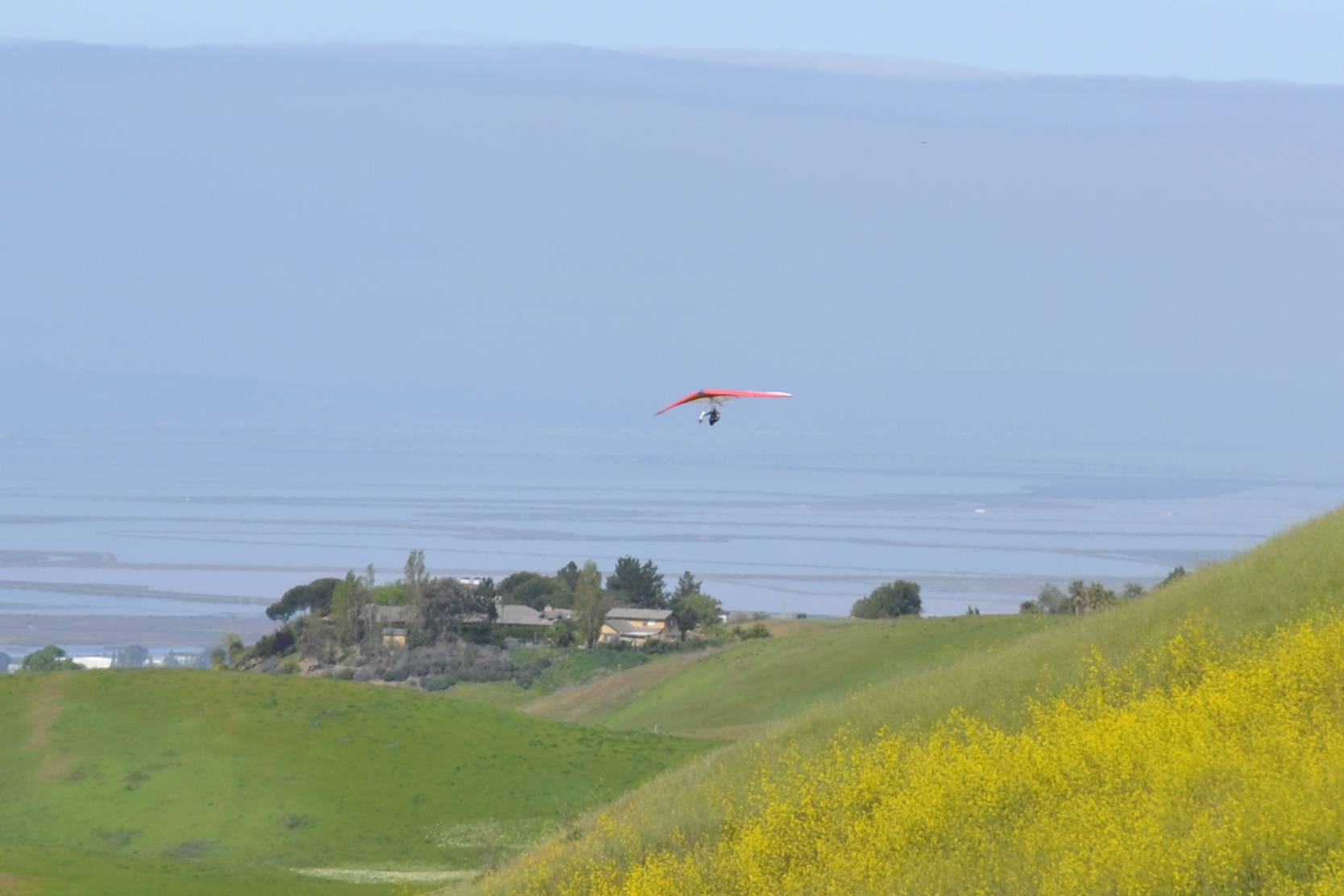
Hang gliding in the park

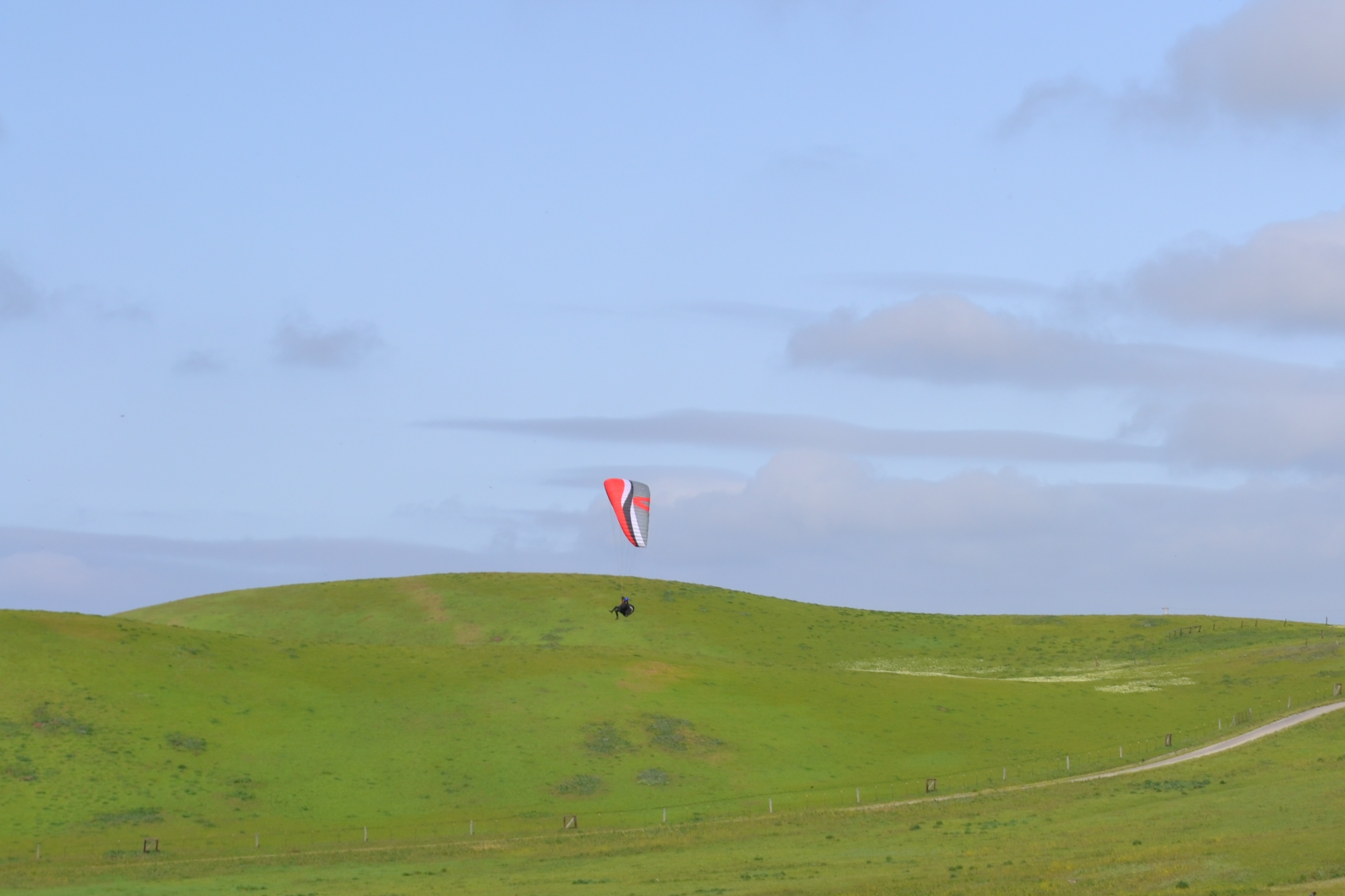
Paragliding in the park

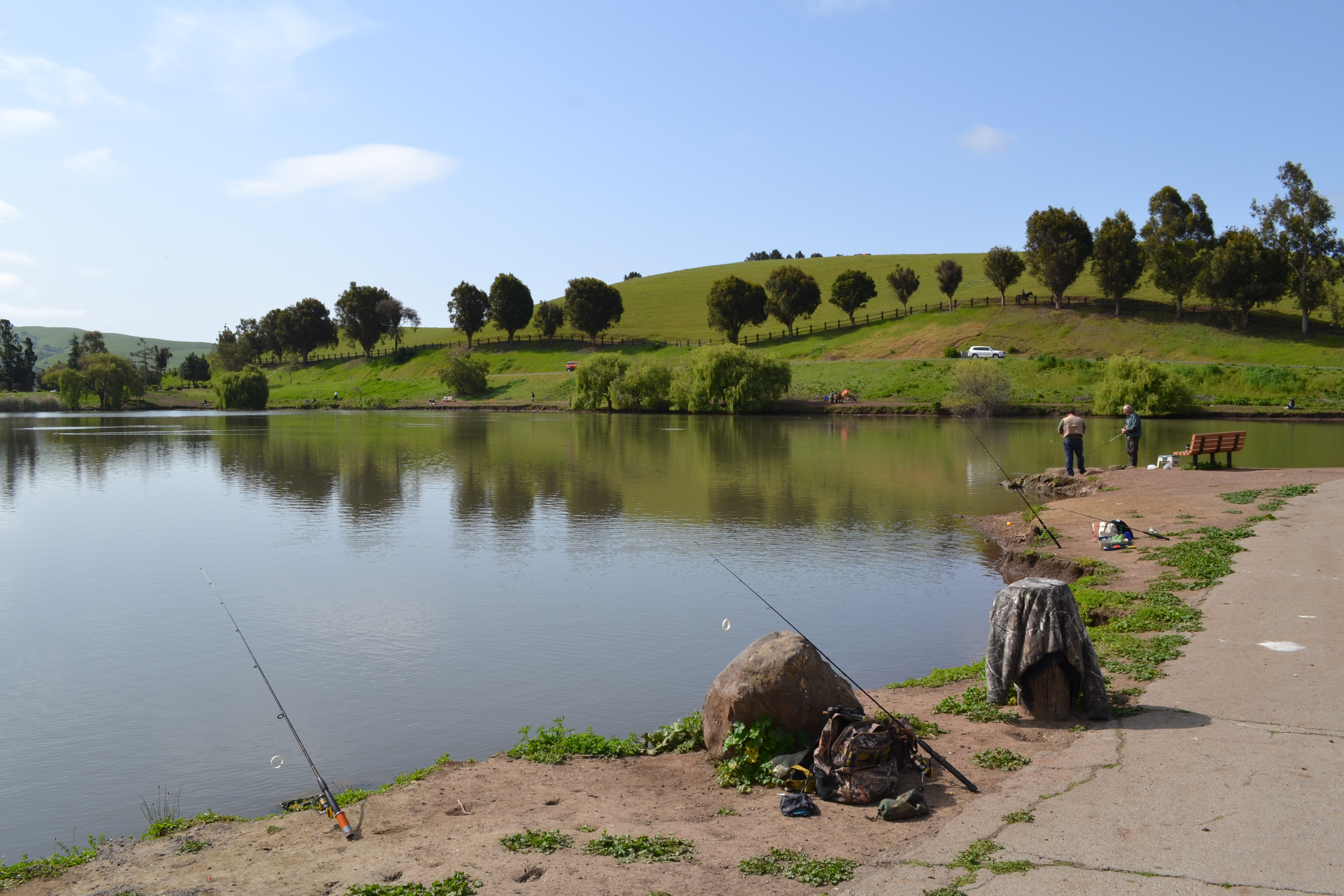
A closer view of Sandy Wool Lake

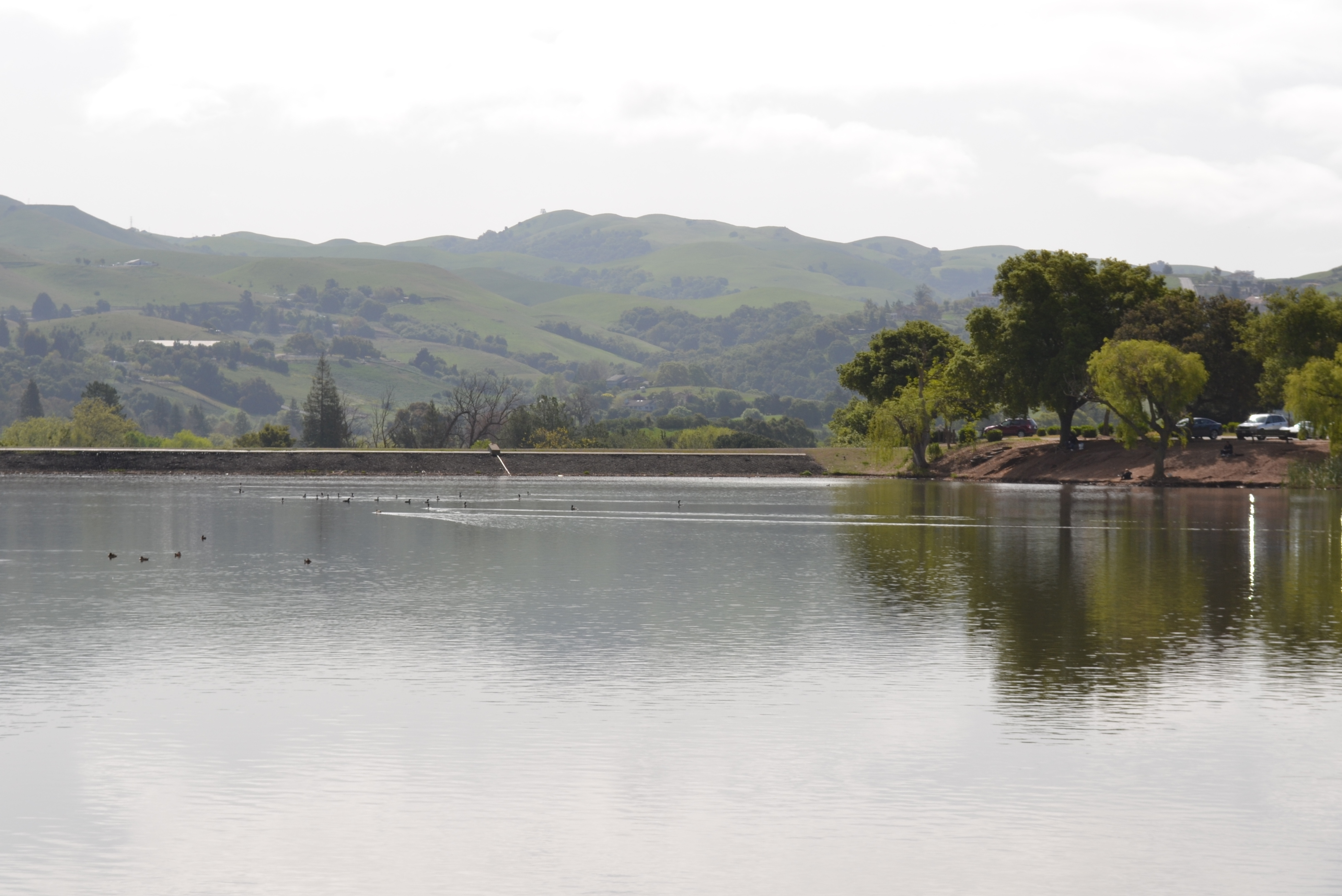
Another view of Sandy Wool Lake and the dam which formed it

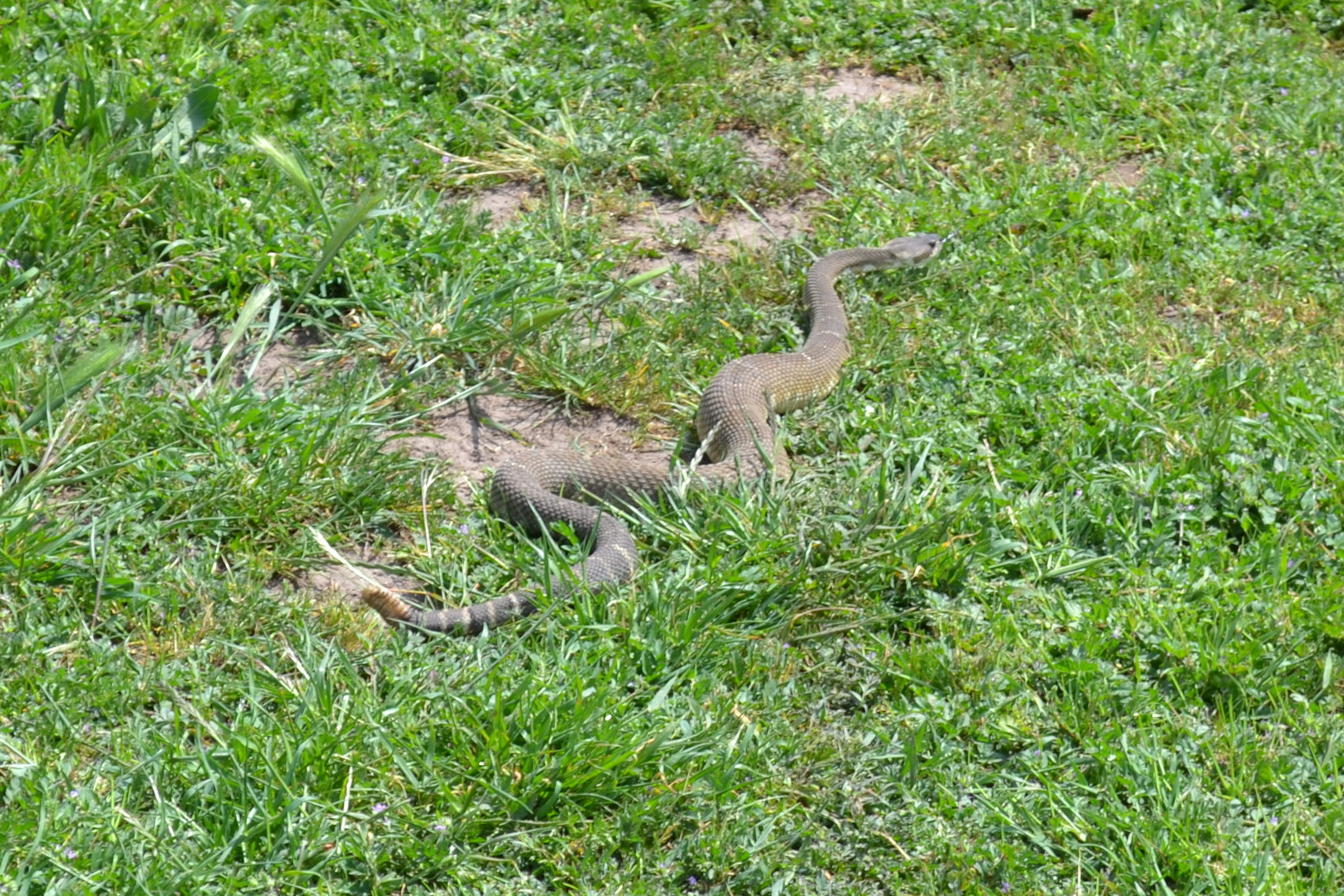
Rattlesnake in the park

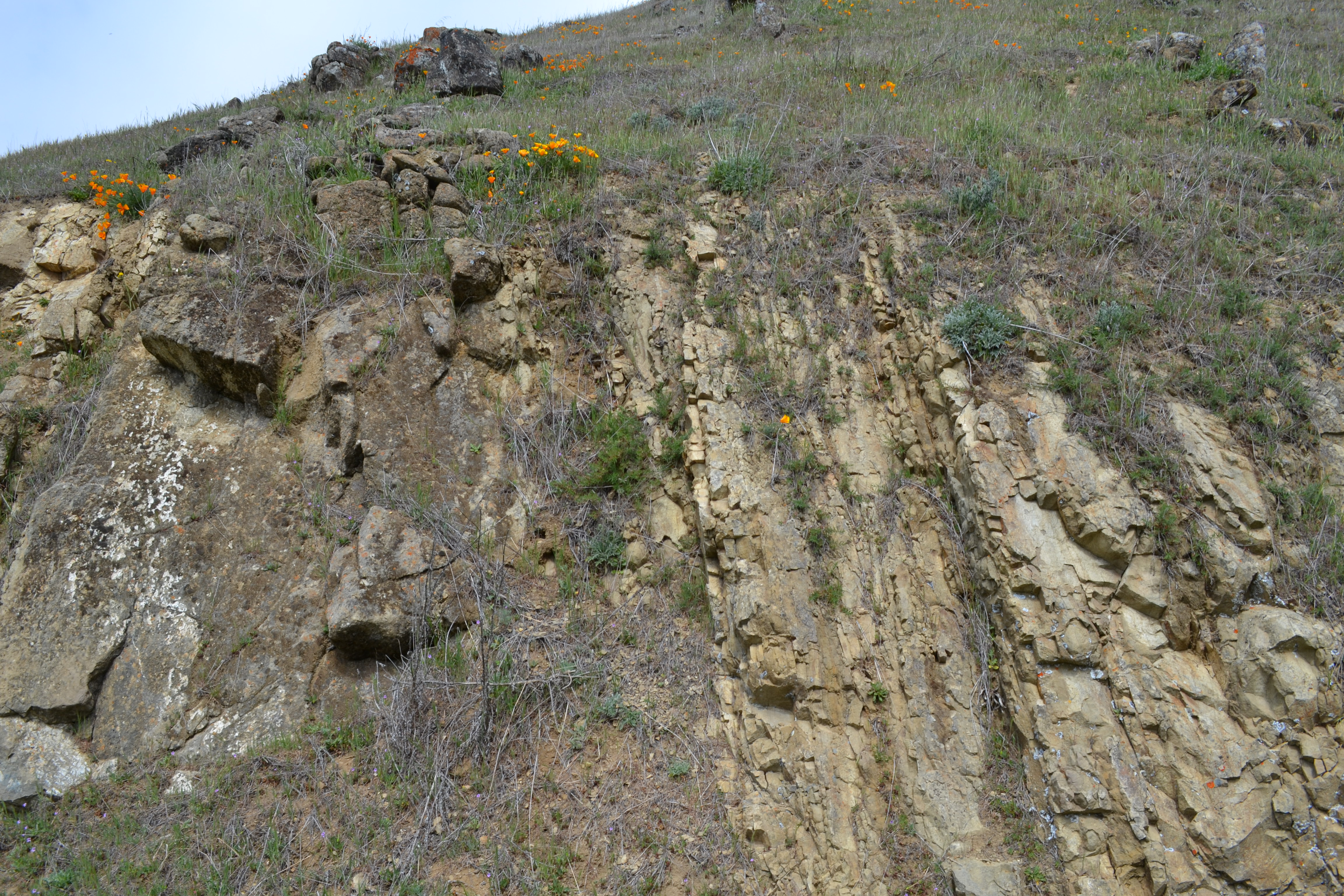
Exposed geological formation in the park
