= KICU-TV =

Television station in San Jose, California

- San Jose–San Francisco–Oakland, California; United States
- City: San Jose, California
- Channels: Digital: 36 (UHF); Virtual: 36
- Branding: Fox 2 Plus

Programming
- Affiliations: 36.1: Independent with MyNetworkTV; for others, see § Subchannels

Ownership
- Owner: Fox Television Stations, LLC
- Sister stations: KTVU

History
- First air date: October 3, 1967
- Former call signs: KGSC-TV (1967–1981)
- Former channel numbers: Analog: 36 (UHF, 1967–2009); Digital: 52 (UHF, 2004–2009)
- Former affiliations: Independent (1967–2024); NBC (secondary, 2008–2009 and 2012–2014)
- Call sign meaning: "I See You"

Technical information
- Licensing authority: FCC
- Facility ID: 34564
- ERP: 550 kW
- HAAT: 686 m (2,251 ft)
- Transmitter coordinates: 37°29′17″N 121°52′3″W

Links
- Public license information: Public file; LMS
- Website: www.ktvu.com/news/all-about-ktvu-plus

KICU-TV (channel 36), branded as Fox 2 Plus, is a television station licensed to San Jose, California, United States, serving the San Francisco Bay Area. It is owned by Fox Television Stations alongside Oakland-licensed Fox outlet KTVU (channel 2). The two stations share studios at Jack London Square in Oakland; KICU-TV's transmitter is located on Monument Peak in Milpitas. It is programmed primarily as an independent station, although it carries Fox's secondary service, MyNetworkTV, as a graveyard slot offering.

== History ==
=== Early years ===
The Continental-Urban Television Corporation applied to the Federal Communications Commission (FCC) on May 20, 1964, to build a new television station on channel 48 in San Jose, California. The FCC granted the construction permit on September 30, but before construction began, a national overhaul of UHF allocations moved the station to channel 36.

Channel 36 first signed on the air on October 3, 1967, as KGSC-TV (for Greater Santa Clara County), from studios located at 1536 Kerley Drive in San Jose. In addition to syndicated off-network series, talk shows and religious programs, the station aired some San Jose-area sports events; a daily women's show hosted by Adel Hall; nightly and weekend Spanish-language programs; a daily children's show, Cosmo's Castle; and bullfighting. The station was small, but that suited the market and the times. KGSC-TV survived at a time when San Francisco had a series of high-profile UHF failures.

Channel 36 was also locally known for its all-night movie presentations, which were co-hosted for several years during the early 1970s by Andy Moore as prospector Old Sourdough and Gary Ferry as his Native American companion Chief Wachikanoka, characters that Moore and Ferry originated for a similar movie showcase on rival independent KEMO-TV (channel 20, now KOFY-TV) (Moore and Ferry hosted a similar program, as the characters Race Street and Bascom Avenue, until Moore left KGSC in 1973–74). The two characters often made jokes about the movies being showcased (similar to the humor used in Mystery Science Theater 3000), as well as engaged in comedic banter with guests promoting local businesses. The format would eventually be revised, with the interstitial segments conducted by Moore and Ferry being phased out in favor of a half-hour segment preceding the film. While there were several sets of hosts for the all-night movies, including Eugene Hogan, an experienced emcee who was best known for his work at San Jose radio station KLOK (1170 AM), most of the station's film presentations following Moore's departure from the station were branded as Movies 'Til Dawn, and sponsored by local retailer MMM Carpets, with which Ferry served as its television spokesman until the mid-1990s. The station promoted itself as "The Perfect 36" during the 1970s, employing busty San Francisco stripper/entertainer Carol Doda as its spokesmodel for station image promotions; Gloria Aponte-Rodriguez also served as spokesmodel for the Latin Weekend Audience programming block during the period.

After a 1978 sale application to Booth American Corporation fell through, Continental sold the station to Ralph Wilson Enterprises, another business owned by the Detroit businessman and Buffalo Bills founder/owner, in 1979. It was the third station owned by the Wilson group and its first independent; Wilson dropped the Perfect 36 image and introduced a new local talk show, known as Noonday. The station subsequently changed its call letters to KICU-TV (a play on the phrase "I See You") on March 27, 1981. The KICU call letters had previously been used in California on channel 43 in Visalia. Doda remained with the station after the Wilson acquisition, taking on a second role reading the station's then-required editorial segments, which were done tongue-in-cheek with double entendres, and with the station's low budget, only one take was recorded without editing and broadcast, even if Doda read something in error.

Over the years, the station ran a number of drama series and older movies; it also added more classic sitcoms and children's programs by the mid-1990s. However, the station gradually decreased the amount of children's programs it carried on its schedule between 1998 and 2002, outside of those it aired on Saturday mornings. In 1992, William Hirshey and three members of the station's management staff—president/general manager Jim Evers, vice president of operations Bill Beeman, and vice president and general sales manager John DuBois—acquired minority ownership stakes in the station, with Ralph Wilson Enterprises retaining majority control.

=== Cox Media Group ownership ===
KICU logo under the "TV36" brand, used from September 2007 to April 25, 2016.

On August 28, 1999, after having rejected unsolicited bids to sell the station for the several years, Ralph Wilson Enterprises announced that it would sell KICU-TV. Station management cited the FCC's August 5 decision to relax its ownership rules to allow a single broadcasting company to own two television stations in the same market (on the pretense that one of the stations is not among the four highest-rated) as a caveat in its decision to divest KICU.

Among the station groups reportedly interested in acquiring KICU was NBC Television Stations, which sought to acquire an owned-and-operated station in the Bay Area after NBC was outbid by Young Broadcasting for longtime NBC affiliate KRON-TV in November 1999, leading to a dispute between the network and Young during negotiations to renew NBC's affiliation agreement with KRON that resulted in the latter group declining to renew the contract after it expired on December 31, 2001. NBC would ultimately reach an affiliation deal with San Jose-based ABC affiliate KNTV (channel 11), after then-owner Granite Broadcasting Corporation (from which NBC would later acquire KNTV) on February 18, 2000.

On November 29, 1999, Wilson sold the station to the Cox Broadcasting subsidiary of Cox Enterprises. The resulting pairing of KICU with KTVU created the Bay Area's first television station duopoly when the deal was finalized in March 2000; the operations of KICU migrated from that station's original studio facilities on Kerley Drive in San Jose, where KTVU relocated its South Bay news bureau, and were consolidated into KTVU's Jack London Square facility in Oakland.

=== Acquisition by Fox Television Stations ===
On June 24, 2014, Fox Television Stations announced that it would acquire KTVU and KICU from the Cox Media Group, in exchange for trading two Fox owned-and-operated stations, WFXT in Boston and WHBQ-TV in Memphis, to the latter group. The trade was completed on October 8, 2014. It was part of Fox's pursuit of station acquisitions in the markets of NFL teams that are part of the National Football Conference—the San Francisco–Oakland–San Jose market, where the San Francisco 49ers are based, became the sixth-largest NFC market where Fox owned at least one television station.

With the completion of the deal, KICU became the first independent station to be operated by Fox since September 2006, when it converted KDFI in Dallas–Fort Worth into a charter owned-and-operated station of the co-owned MyNetworkTV programming service. Until September 2024, KICU was the only secondary Fox-owned station to not carry MyNetworkTV, as KRON-TV had carried the service since its launch, even after transitioning to a CW owned-and-operated station on September 1, 2023.

In November 2014, when KTVU transitioned from Cox's in-house digital platforms to the WorldNow platform used for Fox Television Stations' websites and mobile apps, KICU discontinued its standalone website, with Fox reducing the station's web presence to a minimalist subpage on the revamped KTVU site, incorporating only listings for KICU and KTVU, FCC-required disclosures for Children's Television Act and employment requirements and forms of contact, and the default TMZ on TV video portal.

Logo used from 2016 to 2026.

On April 25, 2016, KICU rebranded as "KTVU Plus", replacing the "TV 36" branding that had been in use since September 2007. The co-branding with sister station KTVU is similar to that adopted in 2009 by San Jose PBS member station KQEH (channel 54), when that station, as a result of its purchase by Northern California Public Broadcasting two years earlier, changed its branding to "KQED Plus" to reflect its ties to sister station KQED (channel 9). Fox would subsequently rebrand its MyNetworkTV stations as similar brand extensions of its Fox O&O sisters in Washington, D.C., Phoenix, Minneapolis–St. Paul, Dallas–Fort Worth, Orlando, Seattle, Los Angeles, and Chicago.

On September 17, 2024, KICU began carrying MyNetworkTV after the expiration of KRON-TV's affiliate agreement, though the service's programming airs in the graveyard slot Tuesday through Saturday mornings from 3 to 5 a.m. (the latest possible time it can in a broadcast day), and is sparingly promoted. The station effectively remains an independent station and continues to carry KTVU newscasts in prime time.

On September 23, 2026, KICU was rebranded as "Fox 2 Plus", in line with Fox's other MyNetworkTV stations.

== Programming ==
Occasionally as time permits, KICU may air Fox network programs normally seen on KTVU in the event that Channel 2 is unable to air them because of extended breaking news coverage or conflicts with Fox Sports event telecasts or locally produced special programming on that station; this was also the case when KTVU aired San Francisco Giants baseball games that ran into or aired during prime time hours, until that station lost the broadcast television rights to the Giants to NBC owned-and-operated station KNTV in 2007. Channel 36 assumed additional backup programming responsibilities in April 2016, when it began to air local newscasts normally seen on KTVU whenever that station is scheduled to air Fox Sports event telecasts that will overflow predeterminedly into the time slot of the given program.

KICU previously aired select NBC programs preempted by the network's designated Bay Area affiliates at three separate times throughout its history. After the market's original NBC affiliate, KRON-TV, removed the program from its schedule in July 1998 (in favor of syndicated talk program The Howie Mandel Show), KICU aired Another World until the soap opera ended its run in June 1999. Ten years later, after KNTV became the broadcast home of the Giants in 2008, KICU took on the role of airing NBC daytime and prime time programs pre-empted by the NBC-owned station. In April 2010, KRON took over the duties of running NBC programs preempted by KNTV. The duty of being NBC's backup affiliate in the Bay Area in the event that KNTV broadcasts Giants games and breaking news coverage reverted over to KICU in 2012. After KICU's sale to Fox Television Stations, preempted NBC programming was fully moved back to KNTV, initially on its Cozi TV–affiliated second digital subchannel and then via a delay to the early morning hours.

=== Sports programming ===
During the station's ownership tenures under Ralph Wilson Enterprises and Cox Enterprises, KICU-TV maintained a strong association with Bay Area sports. Perhaps with the exception of the NFL's San Francisco 49ers and the now-defunct San Jose Lasers of the American Basketball League, each of the city's major professional sports franchises, along with several local college and high school teams, have had their games televised on Channel 36.

KICU obtained the broadcast rights to carry NBA games involving the Golden State Warriors beginning with the 1984–85 season. The station initially aired up to 70 preseason and regular season games per season, some of which were broadcast on tape delay beginning in the late 1990s; the number of Warriors games aired on Channel 36 decreased to 30 per season after the 1997–98 season, when the team renewed its cable agreement with regional sports network SportsChannel Bay Area (later FSN Bay Area, now NBC Sports Bay Area), with KICU also passing a limited number of additional games over to KTVU following Cox's 1999 purchase of KICU. The Warriors' relationship with KICU ended after the 2001–02 season, when the team moved its local broadcasts exclusively to Fox Sports Net Bay Area through the signing of a ten-year deal with the cable channel.

On October 28, 1998, KICU-TV acquired the rights to broadcast Major League Baseball games from the Oakland Athletics, after the team exercised a clause in its existing five-year television contract with KRON-TV to shop the rights to other Bay Area television outlets following the 1998 regular season. It was the second stint for the Athletics on channel 36; they had aired 21 games in 1988 on the station. Under the initial deal in which it became the team's broadcast television flagship, which began with the 1999 season, Channel 36 offered an expanded schedule of 55 regular season games, 25 more than what KRON was able to offer within its schedule due to difficulties with its programming obligations with NBC (all other A's games that were not televised nationally aired in the market on now-defunct Fox Sports Bay Area).

During the first year of the contract, KICU carried all of the team's afternoon games on tape delay on a trial basis, to allow viewers who were at work while the game was being played the opportunity to watch it that evening. However, due to viewer complaints (particularly since play-by-play audio of the games that KICU televised could be heard on radio live, although A's director of broadcasting Ken Pries noted to the San Francisco Chronicle that the team had reservations about allowing the telecasts to be tape-delayed beforehand), the station switched to airing all A's telecasts, regardless of when they were held, live-to-air in May 1999. After it was purchased by Cox, the duopoly of KICU and KTVU, which held the over-the-air rights to the Giants, essentially had exclusive control of the local broadcast television contracts to both of the Bay Area's MLB teams; this lasted until Channel 2 lost the rights to the Giants to NBC owned-and-operated station KNTV following the 2007 season. KICU subsequently lost the rights to the Athletics after the 2009 season, when the team signed an exclusive television deal with Comcast SportsNet California (now NBC Sports California).

The station also was a longtime broadcaster of National Hockey League games featuring the San Jose Sharks from the team's inaugural season in 1991 until FSN Bay Area took over as the Sharks' exclusive local television broadcaster following the 2000–01 season. The station also carried Major League Soccer games involving the San Jose Clash (now the San Jose Earthquakes) from the team's inaugural season in 1996 until FSN Bay Area took over the local rights following the 2000–01 season, and the San Jose SaberCats Arena Football League franchise from that team's inaugural season in 1998 until FSN Bay Area assumed the local television rights to the team following the 2000–01 season.

From 1991 until the program's cancellation in 2008, the station also aired the sports highlight program High School Sports Focus on Friday nights at 11 p.m. (which was rebroadcast on Sundays at 4 p.m.), which covered high school sports events throughout the Bay Area with a primary focus on events involving Santa Clara County area schools; the program won several Regional Emmy Awards throughout its 18-year run. In addition, after FSN Bay Area shut down in 2008, KICU occasionally served as a backup Fox Sports Net affiliate, carrying select basketball and football games to which FSN held rights through its contract with the Pacific-10 Conference.

On April 24, 2017, KTVU relocated the rain-delayed Food City 500 to KICU, marking the first time a NASCAR Cup Series race has been broadcast on the station. This occurred again the next year on April 16, 2018, with the 2018 running of the same race.

In February 2025, KICU will air matches from the Coachella Valley Invitational preseason tournament featuring San Jose Earthquakes of Major League Soccer and Bay FC of the National Women's Soccer League.

=== Newscasts ===
As of September 2023, KTVU does not produce any regularly scheduled newscasts specifically for KICU. However, KICU rebroadcasts some regularly scheduled KTVU weekday newscasts on a delayed basis. In addition, KICU airs all or portions of KTVU's regularly scheduled newscasts live when KTVU preempts them for Fox Sports programming, particularly on Saturday and Sunday mornings. And at one time the station rebroadcast the KTVU-produced public affairs program Bay Area People, Sundays at 9 a.m. until KTVU canceled it.

In August 1981, five months after the Wilson acquisition, KICU-TV debuted a half-hour early evening newscast at 7:30 p.m., focusing on Santa Clara Valley news. The program was eventually moved to 10 p.m. in 1988, placing it in direct competition with eventual sister station KTVU's higher-rated prime time newscast The 10 o'clock News. The newscast was anchored for several years by former KPIX-TV (channel 5) sports anchor Jan Hutchins and Bay Area news veteran Ysabel Duron; the station's reporting staff included among others Bill Buckmaster, Tony Russomanno, and Melanie Morgan. During its first three years in the later slot, Action 36 News at Ten was accompanied at 10:30 p.m. by the nationally syndicated Independent Network News, which was produced by fellow independent station WPIX (now a CW affiliate) in New York City, until both programs were canceled in June 1990. KICU revived its news department in 1992, with the debut of Action 36 Prime News, an early evening local newscast at 7 p.m. that aired seven nights a week; this program was canceled in 1994. In 1995, the station began producing the technology-focused business news program Silicon Valley Business This Week, which aired until 1999.

After being acquired by Cox Enterprises, sister station KTVU began simulcasting its flagship newscast on KICU. In January 2000, the station began airing a rebroadcast of The Ten O'Clock News immediately following its initial broadcast on KTVU each night at 11 p.m., under the title The Eleven O'Clock Edition of the Original Ten O'Clock News (the "Original" branding was used during that period to differentiate from other prime time newscasts that aired in that hour a few years prior on KRON-TV and CBS station KPIX-TV—both of which pushed their network evening schedules one hour early in August 1992, in an attempt to improve prime time viewership and to compete with KTVU—as well as a KNTV-produced program that aired on KBWB-TV [channel 20, now KOFY-TV] at the time); the simulcast was dropped from the schedule on September 14, 2001. From 2001 to 2003, KICU also aired a simulcast of KTVU's morning newscast Mornings on 2 each Monday through Friday from 7 to 9 a.m., with the station inserting a ticker featuring traffic and weather information, news briefs and breaking news stories specific to the South Bay region.

KTVU restored news programming to Channel 36's schedule on January 21, 2008, when that station began producing the half-hour Bay Area News at 7 on TV 36, airing at 7 p.m. each weeknight. The rebroadcast of The Ten O'Clock News was restored onto KICU's schedule on April 5, 2010, being shown this time at 11:30 p.m. each weeknight; the rebroadcast reverted to the 11 p.m. slot it held during its original run on KICU on July 1, 2013, but reverted to 11:30 p.m. when KTVU added an 11 p.m. newscast. On February 12, 2014, Bay Area News at 7 on TV 36 was renamed to KTVU Channel 2 News at 7 on TV 36.

Concurrent with the station's rebranding under the "KTVU Plus" moniker on April 25, 2016, in addition to retaining the late rebroadcast of The Ten O'Clock News, KICU expanded its 7 p.m. newscast to one hour. KICU also began airing an hour-long rebroadcast of the 9 a.m. hour of Mornings on 2 during the 10 a.m. hour, and in September 2020 also began airing an hour-long rebroadcast of KTVU's weekday noon newscast during the 1 p.m. hour. On September 4, 2023, the 7 p.m. newscast was shifted to KTVU itself and KICU no longer airs news at that hour.

==== Notable former on-air staff ====
- Jan Hutchins – anchor

== Technical information ==
=== Subchannels ===
The station's signal is multiplexed:

Subchannels of KICU-TV
Subchannel	Res.	Short name	Programming
36.1	720p	KICU-HD	Main KICU-TV programming
36.2	480i	KBSA	KBS America
36.3	480i	NOSEY	Nosey
36.4	480i	CATCHY	Catchy Comedy
36.5	480i	QVC	QVC

The 36.2 subchannel was a Korean-language channel, KEMS (Korean Everrock Multimedia Service), that operated as a local cable channel and also aired Korean programming from KBS World. In 2007, it purchased KTVN Limited, which had begun using the 36.2 subchannel of KICU-TV the year prior. KEMS went off the air in December 2023.

=== Translator ===
- K30OM-D Monterey

==== Former translator ====
- K24OB-D Ukiah

K24OB-D was a translator station licensed to Ukiah, California. The translator shut down in August 2021.

=== Analog-to-digital conversion ===
KICU-TV shut down its analog signal, over UHF channel 36, on February 17, 2009, to conclude the federally mandated transition from analog to digital television. The station's digital signal relocated from its pre-transition UHF channel 52, which was among the high band UHF channels (52-69) that were removed from broadcasting use as a result of the transition, to its former analog-era UHF channel 36 for post-transition operations.
