= Mission Peak =

Public park in California, United States

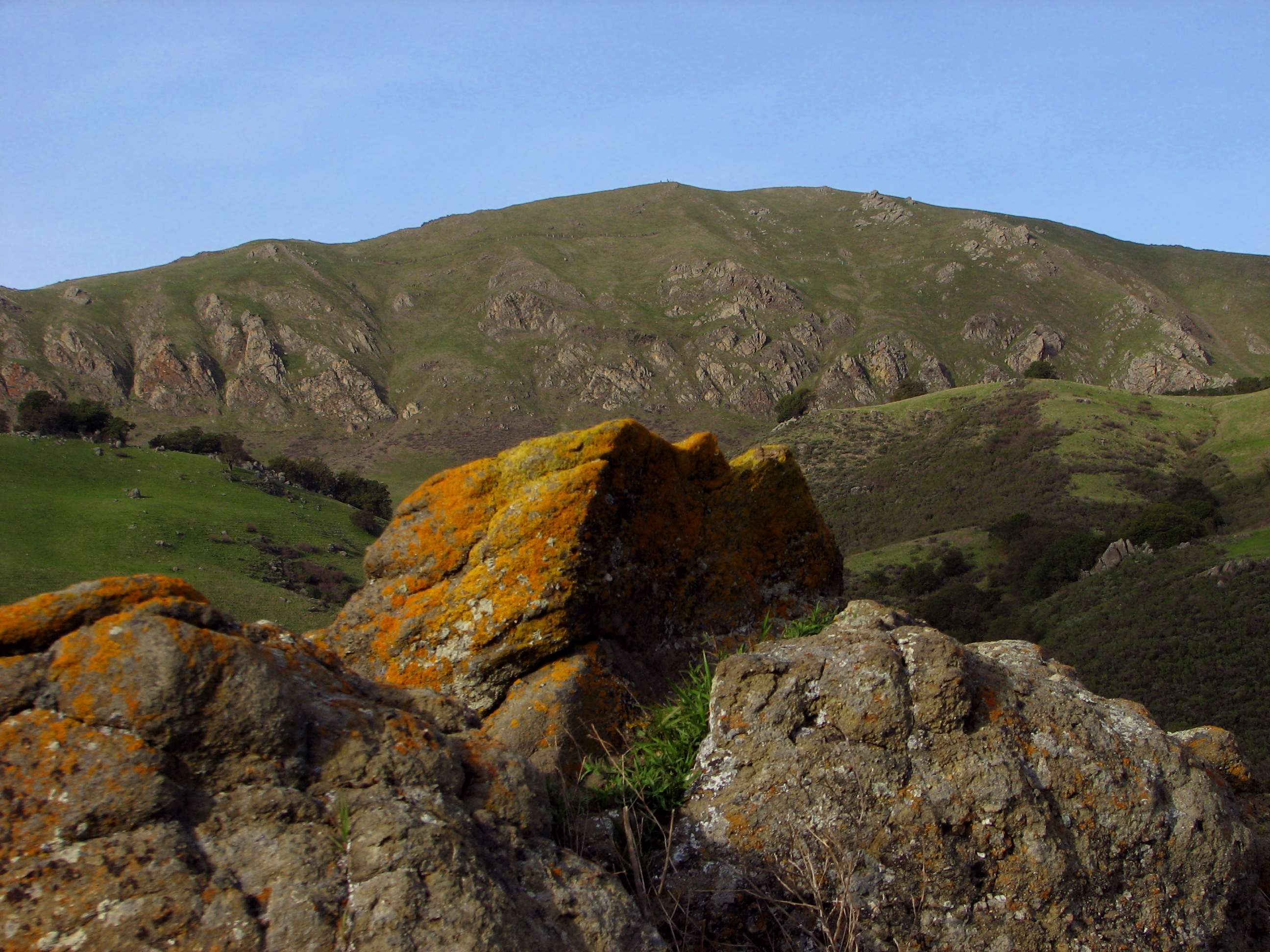

Highest point
- Elevation: 2,520 ft (768 m) NAVD 88
- Coordinates: 37°30′45″N 121°52′50″W

Naming
- Native name: Riisima (Northern Ohlone)

Geography
- Location within California
- Location: Alameda County, California, U.S.
- Parent range: Diablo Range
- Topo map: USGS Niles

Climbing
- Easiest route: Peak Trail or Hidden Valley Trail

Mission Peak is a mountain peak located east of Fremont, California. It is the northern summit on a ridge that includes Mount Allison and Monument Peak. Mission Peak has symbolic importance, and is depicted on the logo of the City of Fremont. It is located in Mission Peak Regional Preserve, a regional park operated by the East Bay Regional Park District.

== Hiking and bicycling ==
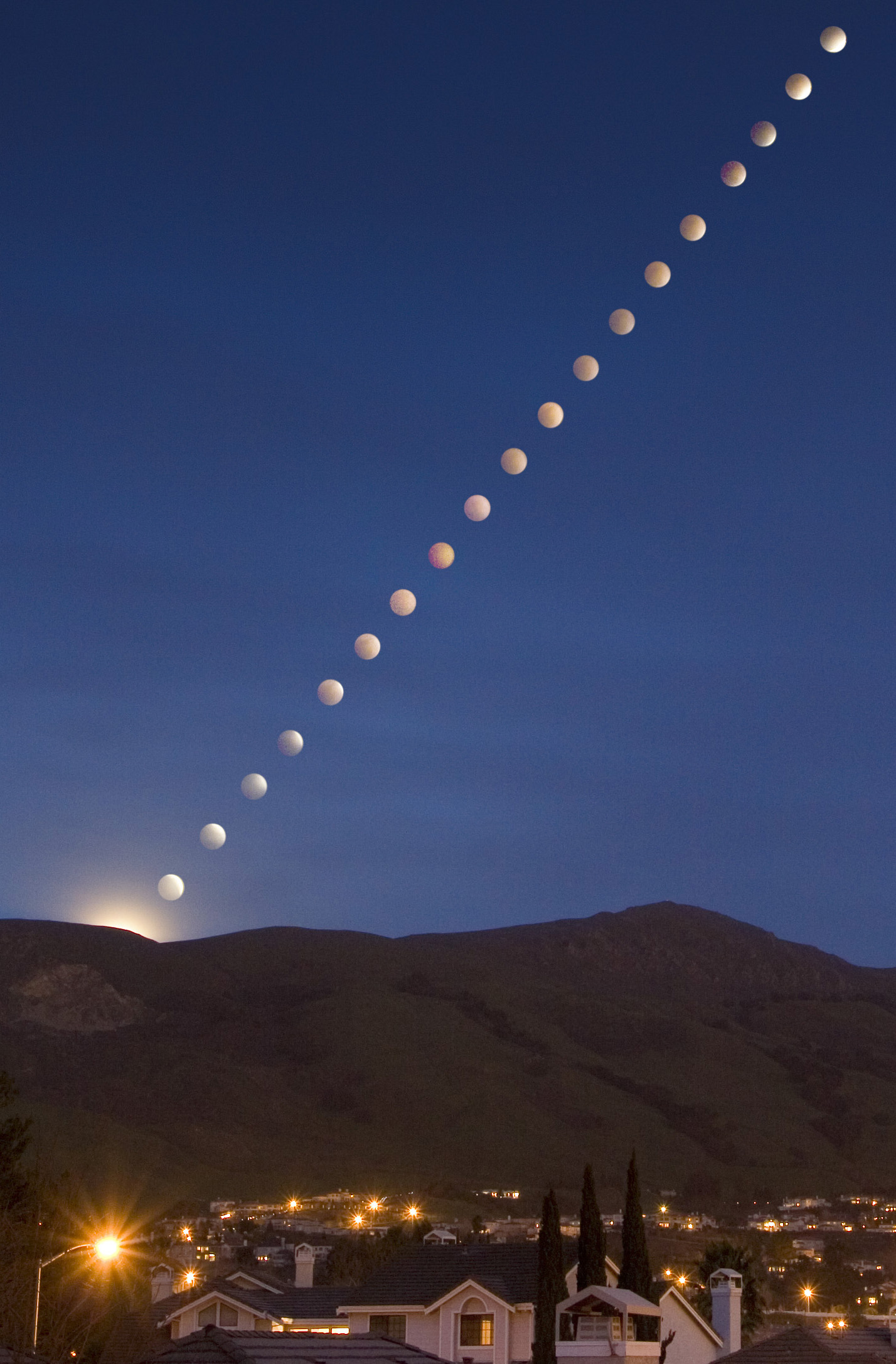
February 2008 lunar eclipse (shown in time lapse composite) rises over Mission Peak

Mission Peak is relatively close to Silicon Valley, so it is popular with local hikers, bicyclists, and sightseers as well as tourists from further away for its view of Silicon Valley and strenuous climb. The "Mission Peeker" marker pole at the summit is a frequently-photographed landmark. The Stanford Avenue entrance receives up to two thousand visitors per day during weekends. Visitor numbers increased significantly after 2010, and it is the most popular attraction in Fremont.

An ascent up Mission Peak is at least a six-mile-long round trip, and tends to take two to five hours for hikers and one to one-and-a-half hours for bicyclists and runners. Dehydration and heat exhaustion are common because of the lack of shade. Guidelines recommend carrying two liters of water per person, extra water for dogs, and sun protection. Signs and barbed wire prohibit off-trail shortcuts to slow down erosion. Food, water bottles, and supplies are kept from being sold at the park.

Mission Peak is located directly on the Peak Trail, a trail which approaches Mission Peak from the northwest and the southeast. Each ascent of Mission Peak eventually travels over a stretch of the Peak Trail before reaching the summit. Trails reach Mission Peak from four staging areas: Stanford Avenue, Ohlone College, Sunol Regional Wilderness, and Ed R. Levin County Park.

Depending on weather conditions, Bay Area peaks including Mount Diablo, Mount Hamilton, and Mount Tamalpais can be seen. Furthermore, the peak provides good views of Oakland, San Jose, San Francisco, Fremont, Union City, and Newark. On very clear days, the Sierra Nevada range are visible 100 miles (160 km) to the east.

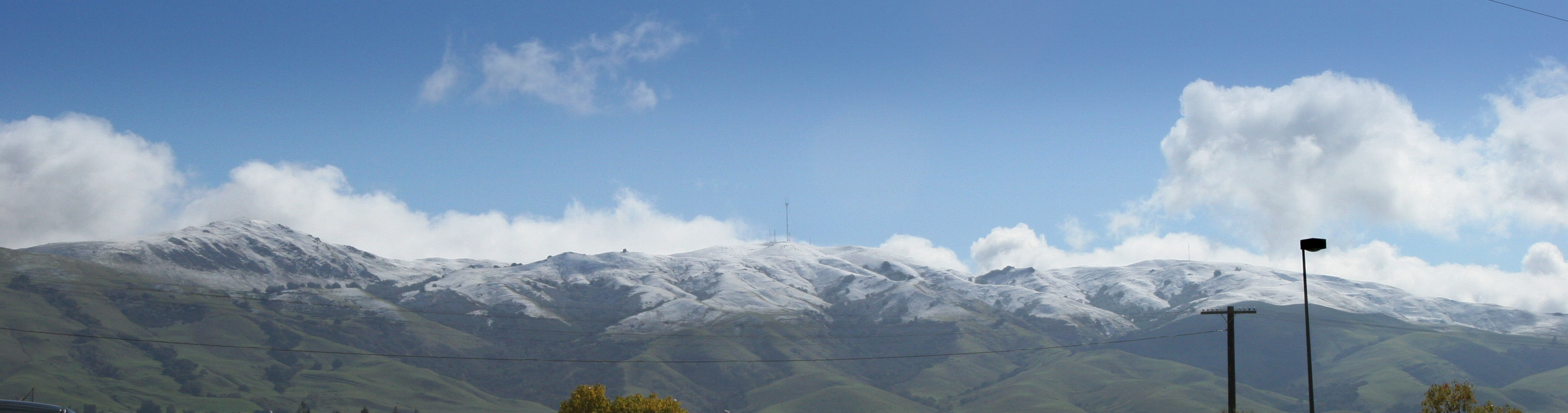
Mission Peak (L), Mount Allison (C) and Monument Peak (R) after an unusual snowfall in March 2006.

Mission Peak connects to a network of regional trails and contains part of the Bay Area Ridge Trail, which is under construction and has gaps to the north of Mission Peak. The Eagle Spring Backpack campsite is just east of the summit.

== Iconic "Mission Peeker" summit pole ==
Sculptor and park ranger Leonard Page along with a crew of six erected the iconic "Mission Peeker" on December 27, 1990. The pole is over six feet (1.8 m) in height, and the foundation is two feet (0.6 m) deep with 120 pounds (54 kg) of concrete.

The sculptor's purpose was to promote environmental awareness. The sticks on the pole represent each pillar of environmental recycling. Sealed inside the steel tube are a crystal with traditional cultural uses, an Ohlone charmstone replica, a bottle of 1990 zinfandel wine whose yeast overshoot represents world population trends, and five time capsules with articles and photographs. The time capsules were intended to be opened in a century or more, after 2090, and focus on rainforest preservation, AIDS, and homelessness. They offer images from popular culture of Bart Simpson, Teenage Mutant Ninja Turtles, and Gary Larson's Far Side cartoons.

The cultural meaning of monuments often change, and the use of this artifact has evolved over a quarter century. Though designed in 1988 as an "interpretive post", with sight tubes pointing to other Bay Area landmarks and cities, the "peeker" function has since been rendered archaic and its environmental message is not widely known.

The marker now functions as a standalone cultural monument, and draws thousands of weekly sightseers and tourists that make it the most photographed artifact in southern Alameda County and the top tourist attraction in Fremont. Snapchat has a geofilter image of the pole representing Fremont.

The pole has become a contested cultural symbol. In 2014, iconoclastic local residents, the Recreation Department of the City of Fremont and the Stewardship Division of EBRPD discussed razing the landmark to dissuade sightseers.

On the morning of Saturday, September 2, 2023, the pole was sawed off by vandals and tossed down the mountainside. The East Bay Regional Park District retrieved the pole and park district crews repaired and welded the pole back in place on October 4, 2023.

== Park access controversy ==
Controversy surrounds access to Mission Peak. Parking is congested near the free 40-space Stanford Avenue lot. Most visitors enter there, and the congestion spills over to nearby public streets on weekends. The East Bay Regional Park District cut park service hours (formerly 5 am to 10 pm) by 30% in late 2014, in part to divert visitors away from the Stanford Avenue entrance. The Stanford opening was delayed to 6:30 am instead of the former 5:00 am, generating a crowd of sunrise viewers who assemble at the gate before it opens on weekends.

In 2015 they discussed further restrictions including a per person daily use (entry) fee, parking permits to restrict public street parking while favoring local residents, parking fees to reduce parking congestion, a dog fee to reduce visits by dog owners and demolition of the iconic summit pole. EBRPD proposed a larger parking lot at the Stanford entrance in 2012; and, as of 2015, completion was expected in 2018.

The city temporarily restricted visitor parking on streets near the Stanford Avenue trail-head in late 2016. Residential permits are required on Saturdays, Sundays and federal holidays in front of houses, near open fields, and near empty lots. One hundred spaces on Weibel Dr are restricted, not fronting houses. The restrictions are temporary, slated to expire on July 7, 2020.

The temporary restriction of park operating hours and street parking, and the parking expansion have generated controversy. The number of visitors dropped significantly prior to 2017, and park activists linked the drop to the parking restrictions and to the cutback of park hours. Standard operating hours were 5:00 a.m. to 10:00 p.m., and the temporary operating hours are slated to expire in July 2020. More than 1,500 parking tickets were issued in the first year, and the city collected over $100,000 in fines.

In 2016, the park district approved plans to construct 300 new parking spaces near the main entrance. However, residents filed suit against the parking expansion on environmental grounds, after petitioning to restrict parking on public streets. The same law firm filed the 2016 action which closed the Regional Park at Vargas Plateau for nearly a year. The lawsuit, principally aimed at keeping park visitors out of the local residential neighborhood, was settled in late 2018. The settlement removed legal obstacles that had stood in the way of the expansion, which was originally estimated to cost $6.5 million in 2016. The park district had raised about $1.5 million for the parking lot as of 2018.

== Hang gliding and paragliding ==
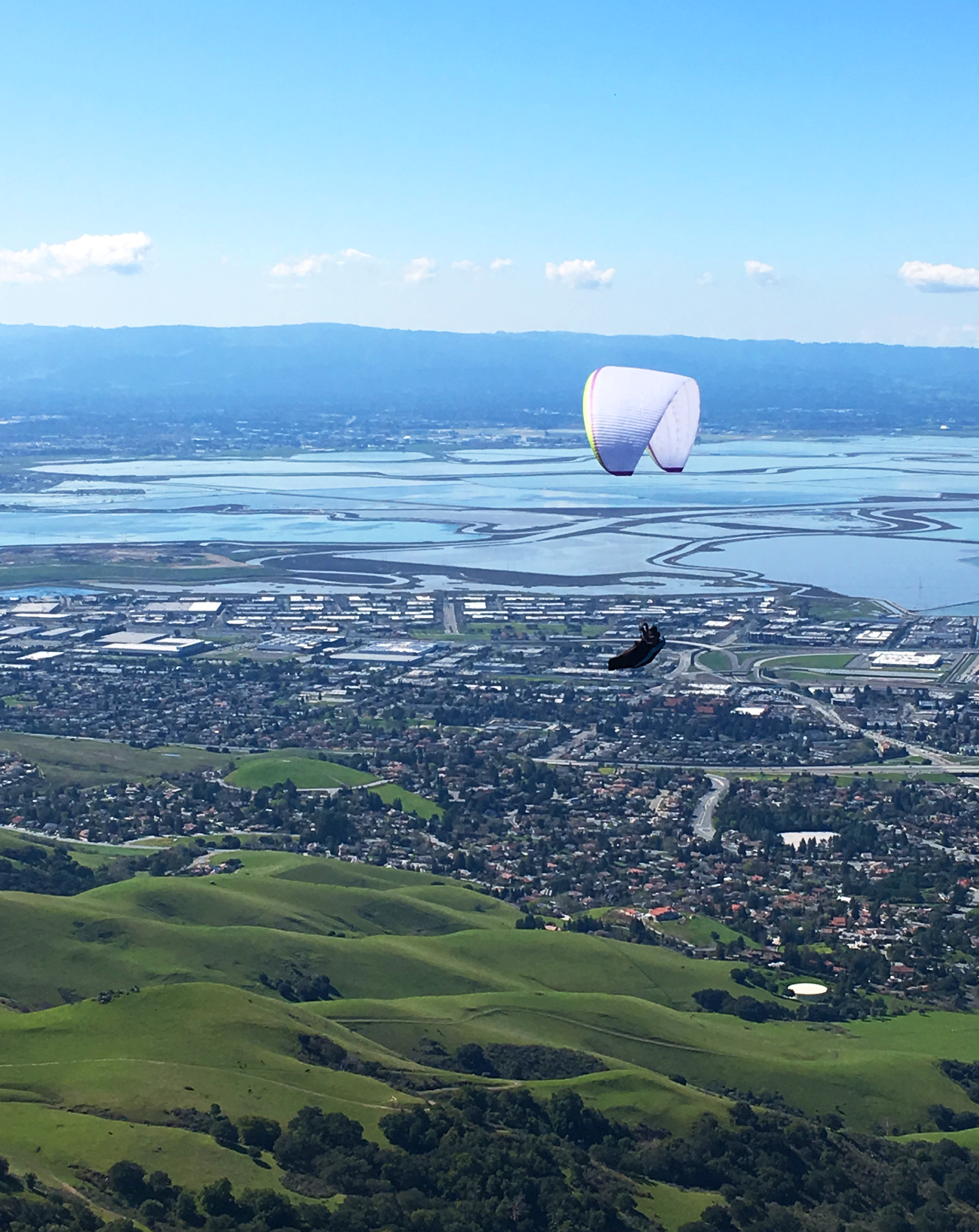
A paraglider viewed from a Mission Peak Vista, late winter 2017

Mission Peak Regional Preserve is a popular location for hang gliding and paragliding.

The Wings of Rogallo Northern California Hang Gliding Association Inc. has been licensed by the East Bay Regional Park District (EBRPD) to administer hang gliding and paragliding at Mission Peak since 1983.

Hikers can observe takeoffs from the launch point 1,950 ft (590 m) above sea level, marked by a large wind sock. Landings occur adjacent to the main hiking trail about one quarter mile (400 m) from the Stanford Avenue entrance, near the proposed site of a parking lot expected in late 2018.

On September 6, 1971, Dave Kilbourne, one of the founders of the Wings of Rogallo, hiked atop Mission Ridge and launched a flex wing hang glider unaided. The flight lasted more than an hour, and he became the first person in the world to do so.

== Environment ==
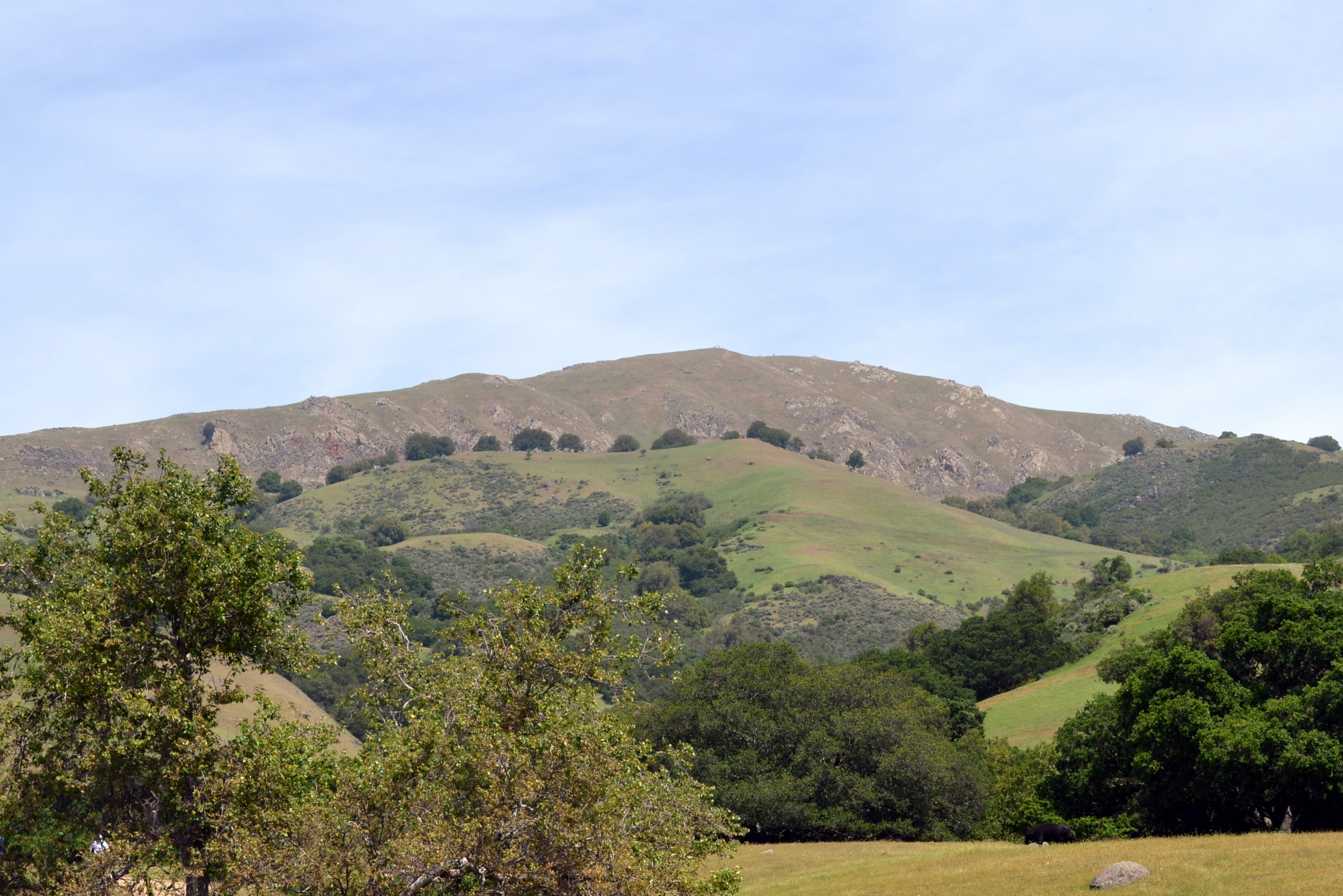
Vegetation at the foothills of Mission Peak

Mission Peak is home to California oak woodland and chaparral. Typical of the interior coast ranges, the woodland contains coast live oak, California bay, California buckeye, blue oak, and western sycamores. Black oak is rare, because most stands have been logged. Bigleaf maples and gray pines are less common, though the old-growth oak forest in the Hidden Valley (see Hiking) known as A.A. Moore Memorial Grove contains all the tree species. Many oaks are 100 to 600 years old, with few younger than 50. Oak saplings have been eaten by cattle and choked by invasives for centuries. The steepest slopes are home to hard, evergreen chaparral, primarily California sagebrush, chamise, and scrub oak.

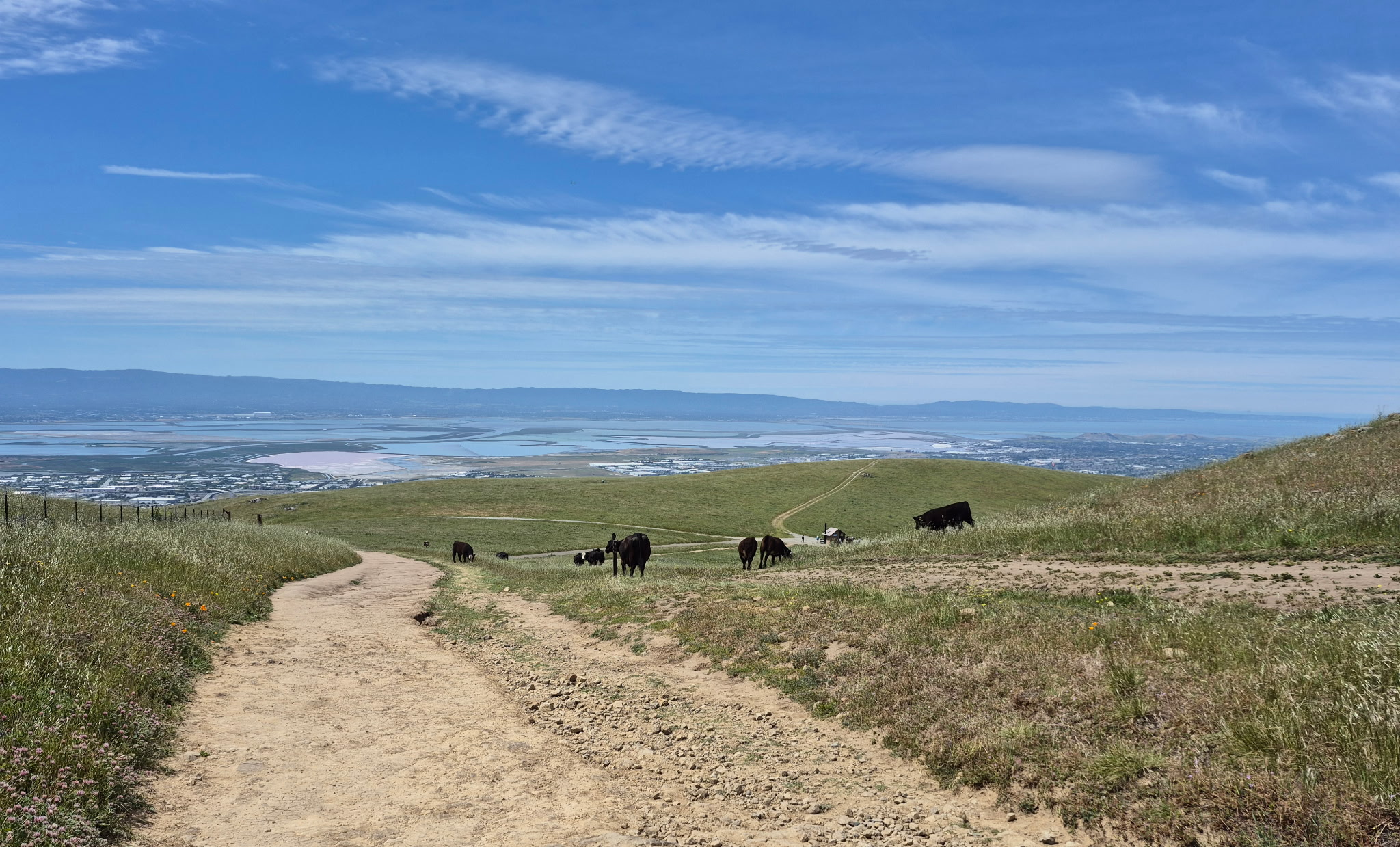
Cattle grazing on Mission Peak

The grasslands have native and nonnative plants brought by cattle, though native wildflowers grow in the spring. The cattle have a feisty reputation. Furthermore, they are highly abundant and widely distributed across the hillside. Black-tailed deer are also abundant. Pronghorn and tule elk were extirpated in the late 19th century. Tule elk were reintroduced to Alameda County, and now visit occasionally. Predators include bobcats, coyotes, gray foxes, and very rarely seen mountain lions. Small mammals include the black-tailed jackrabbit, the western gray squirrel, and California ground squirrels.

Visitors should beware that northern Pacific rattlesnakes are very common.

Southern Alameda County has a high density of nesting golden eagles, seen often, along with turkey vultures, red-tailed hawks, red-shouldered hawks, prairie falcons, and sharp-shinned hawks. They nest in on the slopes of steep valleys, where no trails enter.

Light snow falls most winters, and melts quickly. Heavy snow falls once or twice a decade, such as in March 2006 (see picture in the Hiking and bicycling section). On December 7, 2009, the snow level dropped to 1,000 ft (300 m) and snow remained for three days. In February 2023, storms dropped several inches of snow again.

== Geology ==
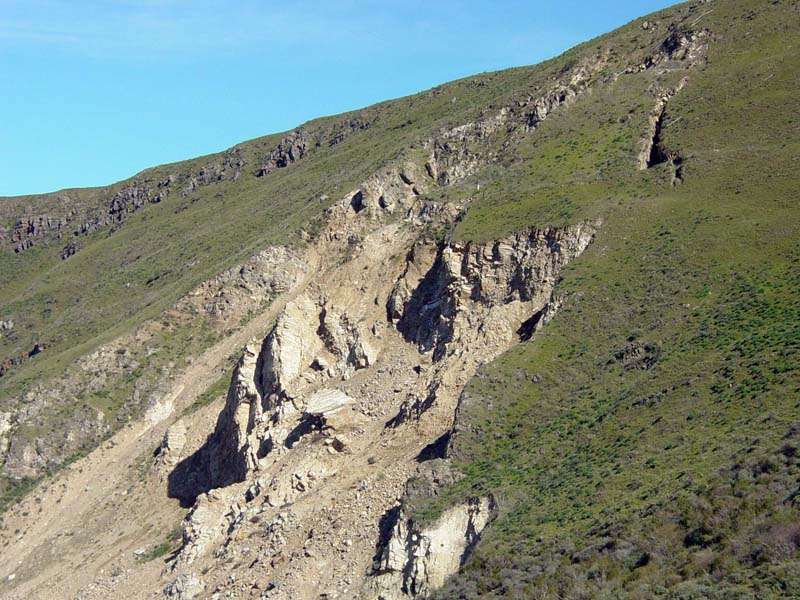
Landslide on the side of Mission Peak

Mission Peak has a large (300 m wide by 1200 m long) landslide that started in 1998 due to the El Niño rains. Landslides had recurred here in the geological past. The landslide threatened new housing, and local development regulations were changed to address the geotechnical hazards.

Some sources have incorrectly labeled Mission Peak as an extinct volcano, because of the sharp point of the peak. However, the mountain is a product of natural uplift and erosion, not of volcanic origin. This range is being compressed and uplifted due to the proximity of the Hayward Fault to the west and the Calaveras Fault to the east.
