= KMTP-TV =

Television station in San Francisco

- San Francisco–Oakland–San Jose, California; United States
- City: San Francisco, California
- Channels: Digital: 32 (UHF), shared with KCNS, KTNC-TV and KEMO-TV; Virtual: 32
- Branding: KMTP

Programming
- Affiliations: 32.1: Non-commercial Independent

Ownership
- Owner: Minority Television Project

History
- First air date: August 31, 1991
- Former channel numbers: Analog: 32 (UHF, 1991–2009); Digital: 33 (UHF, until 2018); 28 (UHF, 2018–2020)
- Call sign meaning: Minority Television Project

Technical information
- Licensing authority: FCC
- Facility ID: 43095
- ERP: 1,000 kW
- HAAT: 511.7 m (1,679 ft)
- Transmitter coordinates: 37°45′19″N 122°27′10″W

Links
- Public license information: Public file; LMS
- Website: www.kmtp.tv

KMTP-TV (channel 32) is an independent non-commercial educational television station licensed to San Francisco, California, United States, serving the San Francisco Bay Area. Owned by the Minority Television Project, the station maintains studios on Woodside Way in San Mateo. Its transmitter, shared with KCNS, KTNC-TV and KEMO-TV, is located atop Sutro Tower in San Francisco.

KMTP airs a large amount of multilingual, ethnic programming. The station produces and broadcasts a daily news show, 5 Day News, and also broadcasts programming from Deutsche Welle TV, NASA TV, and K-pop. KMTP is one of the few non-PBS-affiliated public television stations in the United States, and one of two such stations in the San Francisco Bay Area (the other being KPJK in San Mateo).

== History ==
On March 9, 1954, the station began commercially as KSAN-TV on UHF channel 32; it was one of the first UHF TV stations in California. Owned by the Patterson family, operators of KSAN radio, the station was a small production studio and broadcast operation housed in the renovated Sutro Mansion in San Francisco and showed an amalgam of boxing and wrestling matches, medical conferences, and old movies. The station went off the air in 1958. The KSAN-TV call letters now reside on the NBC affiliate on channel 3 in San Angelo, Texas.

The TV station was purchased by Metromedia in 1968 and went on the air on June 17, when the call sign was moved to an FM radio station and the TV station rechristened KNEW-TV, to match its co-owned KNEW radio and to complement Metromedia's flagship station in New York, WNEW-TV (now Fox owned-and-operated station WNYW). KNEW-TV ran the syndicated Metromedia talk shows and variety programming of such stars as shock-talker Joe Pyne, and others.

This format was unsuccessful, and on May 15, 1970, channel 32 was donated to leading public broadcaster KQED (channel 9) and had its call sign changed again, this time as KQEC, a member station of PBS. KQED held onto the station until 1988 when the Federal Communications Commission (FCC) revoked the license, ruling that it had been off the air too long to remain in the hands of the KQED ownership (KQED kept KQEC off the air for most of 1972 through 1977, and then again for several months in 1979–80), and reassigned the license to Minority Television Project, one of the challengers of the KQEC license. In 1989, KRON-TV partnered with KQED to create KQEC, an all-news channel called "Bay News Center", in March 1990. Prior to the partnership, KRON tried to find a cable news channel, as the Bay Area did not have any regional news channels. This did not come into fruition because both stations wanted to pursue their own efforts to create a regional all-news channel in January 1990. The present-day KMTP-TV signed on August 31, 1991, as the nation's second African-American owned public television station.

In the FCC's 2016–2017 Broadcast Incentive Auction #1001, KMTP-TV successfully bid to go off the air for a compensation of $87,824,258. KMTP claimed in a March 31, 2017, press release, that it was negotiating with other broadcast stations in the Bay Area to share a channel. In FCC filings, it claimed a Channel Sharing Agreement had been signed, after completion of the auction, that would enable KMTP to continue broadcasting but on a different channel. This would be seamless for viewers as they would still tune to channel 32.

== Controversy ==
In 2004, the FCC levied a $10,000 fine against KMTP for showing paid commercials on a station with an educational license. While it is commonplace for PBS and similar stations to show underwriters' messages that resemble commercials, it is illegal for educationally licensed stations, like KMTP, to show advertisements that do not meet the standards for underwriting announcements. KMTP appealed the decision in 2005, but the fine was upheld, prompting KMTP to file a lawsuit against the FCC in U.S. District Court the following year.

In suing the FCC, KMTP felt it was unfairly penalized by the FCC's rules concerning underwriting that did not take into account foreign language broadcasting and the variations in pronunciations and meanings. KMTP carried out research to find out what the public interpreted a commercial to be. Using a numerical grading system, certain aspects of a video clip were found by the public to "feel" like a commercial or not like a commercial. These findings were presented to the FCC, as it did not depend on particular words or phrases which can be misinterpreted when foreign languages are used. The FCC rejected KMTP's attempt to clarify the underwriting rules, leaving KMTP with no choice but to take the matter to court.

On April 12, 2012, a three-judge panel on the U.S. Ninth Circuit Court of Appeals ruled on two of the issues raised by KMTP's suit. The panel ruled that non-commercial stations can air advertisements for both candidates and political position statements. The 1981 federal law was found to be violating free speech. This was a partial victory for KMTP, as it did not address the basic issue of how commercials differ from the sponsorships on which most public stations depend for financial support. The case was reheard by the 9th Circuit en banc, which in 2013 overruled the panel, declaring that the 1981 law was constitutional (NPR and PBS filed in support of the FCC); the Supreme Court declined to hear the case in the following year, ensuring that non-commercial stations cannot air political advertisements.

== Subchannels ==
Subchannels of KCNS, KMTP-TV, KTNC-TV, and KEMO-TV
| License | Channel | Res. | Short name | Programming |
|---|---|---|---|---|
| KCNS | 38.1 | 720p | KCNS | Shop LC |
| KCNS | 38.2 | 480i | SkyLink | Sky Link TV |
| KCNS | 38.3 | 480i | SBN | SonLife |
| KCNS | 38.5 | 480i | QVC365 | QVC 365 |
| KCNS | 38.6 | 480i | NTD Eng | NTD America |
| KMTP-TV | 32.1 | 480i | KMTP | Non-commercial Independent |
| KTNC-TV | 42.1 | 720p | KTNC | TCT |
| KTNC-TV | 42.2 | 480i | JTV | Jewelry TV |
| KEMO-TV | 50.1 | 720p | ShopHQ | QVC |
| KEMO-TV | 50.2 | 720p | VisionL | New Tang Dynasty Television |
| KEMO-TV | 50.3 | 480i | KEMO | Estrella TV (KOFY-TV) |
| KEMO-TV | 50.4 | 480i | Outlaw | Outlaw |
| KEMO-TV | 50.5 | 480i | Timeles | Infomercials |

Subchannel broadcast with MPEG-4 video
Simulcast of subchannels of another station
