= KRCB =

KRCB may refer to:

- KRCB (TV), a television station (channel 5, virtual 22) licensed to serve Cotati, California, United States
- KRCB-FM, a radio station (104.9 FM) licensed to serve Rohnert Park, California
- KRCG-FM, a radio station (91.1 FM) licensed to serve Santa Rosa, California, which held the call sign KRCB-FM from 1993 to 2021
