= KTNC-TV =

Television station in Concord, California

- Concord–San Francisco–Oakland– San Jose, California; United States
- City: Concord, California
- Channels: Digital: 32 (UHF), shared with KMTP-TV, KCNS, and KEMO-TV; Virtual: 42

Programming
- Affiliations: 42.1: TCT; for others, see § Subchannels

Ownership
- Owner: Total Christian Television; (Radiant Life Ministries, Inc.)

History
- First air date: June 19, 1983
- Former call signs: KFCB (1983–1996)
- Former channel numbers: Analog: 42 (UHF, 1983–2009); Digital: 63 (UHF, until 2009), 14 (UHF, 2009–2017), 39 (UHF, 2017–2020)
- Former affiliations: Independent (1983–2001); Azteca América (2001–2007); TuVision (2007–2009); Estrella TV (2009–2016); Infomercials/Chinese (2016–2020); Sonlife (2020–2021)
- Call sign meaning: Television for Northern California

Technical information
- Licensing authority: FCC
- Facility ID: 21533
- ERP: 1,000 kW
- HAAT: 511.7 m (1,679 ft)
- Transmitter coordinates: 37°45′19″N 122°27′10″W

Links
- Public license information: Public file; LMS

KTNC-TV (channel 42) is a religious television station licensed to Concord, California, United States, serving the San Francisco Bay Area. The station is owned by Total Christian Television (TCT). KTNC-TV's transmitter, shared with KMTP-TV, KCNS, and KEMO-TV, is located atop Sutro Tower in San Francisco.

== History ==
=== As an independent station ===
The station first signed on the air on June 19, 1983, as KFCB, which was originally owned by First Century Broadcasting (later known as Family Christian Broadcasting)—from which the station's original call letters were taken. At that time, its president was Reverend Ronn Haus. A majority of the station's broadcast day was devoted to Christian programming, including its own in-house productions. The station's flagship program was called California Tonight (later retitled Coast to Coast), a Christian talk show with sermons, conversations with religious topics and musical guests. The program utilized an applause cart (audio tape cartridge) to give the viewers the impression that a studio audience was present during the tapings. Other programs seen on the station included The 700 Club, Dr. Robert Schuller's Hour of Power and various other local and national religious programs, usually of an evangelical nature.

In its earliest years, KFCB supplemented the religious programs with secular shows such as Speed Racer, Dennis the Menace, The Donna Reed Show, Father Knows Best, The Mighty Hercules, Candid Camera, New Zoo Revue and other programs as well as CNN Headline News, for about six hours a day. Although the station aired secular programming and some commercials, KFCB's primary revenue source continued to come from viewer donations; commercial revenue was not significant. The few commercials that aired were primarily "direct response" spots and public service announcements. The station broadcast semi-annual telethons, in the manner of public television and radio stations. Christian children's programs included The Gospel Bill Show, Superbook and Davey and Goliath. From 1985 to 1986, the station phased out most of its secular shows, although a lineup of such programs remained on Saturday mornings until at least 1989. The secular shows were occasionally modified to meet the station's programming standards—for example, master control operators were instructed to cover up the "Hollywood Minute" feature during CNN Headline News broadcasts, and beer commercials were deleted from airings of the syndicated discussion program It's Your Business. During the fall of 1989, KFCB aired a schedule of Western Athletic Conference college football games.

KFCB's studios were originally located at 5101 Port Chicago Highway, in the industrial section of north Concord, just north of the interchange with State Route 4. Later, space was leased in a neighboring office building for additional offices and a larger studio. Only the cameras (three RCA TK-761's) were moved to the new studio, with the control room remaining in the original building. The new studio boasted an unusual feature—a restroom in the middle of the studio floor, the result of the studio being located in a roughed-in, but unfinished, office structure. The restroom was placed off-limits during tapings as a result of not being soundproof. The RCA transmitter was located on the north peak of Mount Diablo, in a very difficult to access building which was barely large enough to house the transmitter itself—the result of challenges from environmentalists against the station's original application for a construction permit. An engineer working on the front panel of the transmitter was actually standing outside the building itself (the North Peak transmitter site was decommissioned in June 2009, while the digital transmitter was located on Mt. Diablo's main peak).

KFCB maintained a full-time production staff and generated much of its own programming, primarily short ministry programs with local ministers. A Sunday afternoon public-affairs program, Open Forum, covered secular community issues and was the result of an agreement between First Century Broadcasting and a competing applicant for the channel 42 license. The program was later replaced by a similar show, The Informed Viewer.

Around 1988, a translator station, K34AV, was built in Fresno to rebroadcast KFCB's signal. The translator became low-power station KSDI-LP in 1997 (now on channel 33) and is no longer associated with KFCB/KTNC. Efforts around the same time to construct another translator in Modesto, and purchase a full-power station in the New York City market failed.

In 1990, the license renewal application of KFCB came under fire from minority groups for alleged failures to comply with the equal employment opportunity regulations of the Federal Communications Commission (FCC). After an investigation by the FCC, the license was ultimately renewed. A few years later, Haus and other partners decided to form United Christian Broadcasting, with KFCB as the flagship station. The network was intended to bring KFCB's programming to a national audience. The venture would prove to be a financial disaster, and by 1996, Haus was forced to sell the station to Pappas Telecasting, who adopted the KTNC-TV callsign on September 20.

In 1997, Pappas acquired KFWU-TV in Fort Bragg in 1997 from Sainte Limited, at which point KFWU became a satellite of KTNC (though at first, KFWU was considered the main station and KTNC the satellite). That station became KUNO-TV in 2003.

KUNO was sold to Jeff Chang in July 2010. Chang would later drop the KTNC simulcast in favor of Retro Television Network programming, under new call letters (originally KBQR; now KQSL), upon taking over.

=== As a Spanish-language station ===
KTNC's logo as a TuVision affiliate.

KTNC was among the earliest affiliates of Azteca América upon its formation in 2001. However, Pappas Telecasting terminated KTNC's affiliation agreement with the network on June 30, 2007. The next day, KTNC officially became a part of Pappas' independent Spanish language network, TuVision. The Azteca América affiliation for the San Francisco market moved to a newly created digital subchannel of KBWB (channel 20, now KOFY-TV), while the network's Sacramento affiliation moved to low-power station KSTV-LP. DirecTV replaced KTNC with the KBWB subchannel in some locations on July 1, 2007.

On January 16, 2009, it was announced that several Pappas stations, including KTNC and KUNO, would be sold to New World TV Group, after the sale received United States bankruptcy court approval.

Former logo for KTNC under Estrella TV affiliation until December 30, 2016.

KTNC affiliated with Estrella TV upon its launch in 2009. On January 18, 2013, NRJ TV announced that it would acquire KTNC-TV from Titan TV Broadcast Group for $13.5 million, as part of a two-station deal that also included Houston sister station KUBE-TV; Titan TV Broadcast Group would continue to operate the stations upon the sale's consummation. The acquisition of KTNC created a legal duopoly with MundoMax affiliate KCNS (channel 38, which was bought by NRJ for $15 million in 2011); Titan Broadcast Management maintains a one-third equity stake in NRJ TV. The sale was consummated on July 1.

KTNC was the Central Valley's Estrella TV affiliate until June 1, 2015, when Sacramento's KQCA added the network to one of their subchannels. The Central Valley feed on 42.2 was replaced with The Works. The Works on 42.3 was initially replaced with color bars before the channel was deleted.

=== Return to English-language programming ===
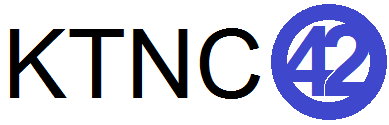
Former logo for KTNC as an independent station from December 31, 2016, until November 30, 2020.

On December 31, 2016, KTNC ended its Estrella TV affiliation, and commenced airing of paid programming. The station also began airing programming from NTDTV during the prime time hours.

On February 5, 2018, the station dropped NTDTV programming and became affiliated with the SF Primetime TV network, also referred to as LA Primetime TV, or just Primetime TV. The network emanated from Los Angeles–area station KSCI. Primetime TV aired weekdays from 11 a.m. to 12 noon and 7 to 9 p.m. KTNC also aired programming from GoodTV USA weekdays from 10 to 10:30 a.m.

On December 9, 2019, it was announced that WRNN-TV Associates, owner of New York City-based WRNN-TV, secured a deal to purchase seven full-power TV stations including KCNS, and one Class A station from NRJ. The sale was approved by the FCC on January 23, and was completed on February 4, 2020, breaking up NRJ's duopoly in the Bay Area, although KCNS and KTNC continue channel sharing. Upon completion of the sale, SonLife Broadcasting Network, which KCNS had been airing since September 2016, was dropped from KCNS, and transferred to KTNC which carries the religious network 24 hours a day. KTNC also added Spanish religious channel Canal de la Fe, from Garden Grove station KBEH (now KWHY), on its .2 frequency.

On October 6, 2020, it was announced that Radiant Life Ministries (a sister company to Total Christian Television) would purchase KTNC-TV for $7.75 million; the sale was completed on November 30.

== Technical information ==
=== Subchannels ===
Subchannels of KCNS, KMTP-TV, KTNC-TV, and KEMO-TV
License	Subchannel	Res.	Short name	Programming
KCNS	38.1	720p	KCNS	Shop LC
KCNS	38.2	480i	SkyLink	Sky Link TV
KCNS	38.3	480i	SBN	SonLife
KCNS	38.5	480i	QVC365	QVC 365
KCNS	38.6	480i	NTD Eng	NTD America
KMTP-TV	32.1	480i	KMTP	Non-commercial Independent
KTNC-TV	42.1	720p	KTNC	TCT
KTNC-TV	42.2	480i	JTV	Jewelry TV
KEMO-TV	50.1	720p	ShopHQ	QVC
KEMO-TV	50.2	720p	NTD	New Tang Dynasty Television
KEMO-TV	50.3	480i	KEMO	Estrella TV (KOFY-TV)
KEMO-TV	50.4	480i	Outlaw	Outlaw
KEMO-TV	50.5	480i	Timeles	Infomercials

Subchannel broadcast with MPEG-4 video
Simulcast of subchannels of another station

=== Analog-to-digital conversion ===
On June 3, 2009, the FCC announced that KTNC would be one of 35 stations to go dark at the end of the transition from analog to digital broadcasts for full-power television stations in the United States on June 12, 2009. However, the station was transmitting a digital signal as of June 13, 2009. KTNC-TV shut down its analog signal, over UHF channel 42, on June 12. The station moved its digital signal from its pre-transition UHF channel 63, which was among the high band UHF channels (52-69) that were removed from broadcasting use as a result of the transition, to UHF channel 14, using virtual channel 42.
