= KEMO-TV =

Television station in Fremont, California

- Fremont–San Francisco–Oakland–; San Jose, California; United States
- City: Fremont, California (Note: Originally licensed to Santa Rosa, California; moved to Fremont in 2018.)
- Channels: Digital: 32 (UHF), shared with KMTP-TV, KCNS and KTNC-TV; Virtual: 50

Programming
- Affiliations: 50.1: QVC; for others, see § Subchannels

Ownership
- Owner: Innovate Corp.; (HC2 Station Group, Inc.)
- Sister stations: KQRO-LD

History
- Founded: April 20, 1981
- First air date: May 15, 1981
- Former call signs: KFTY (1981–2011)
- Former channel numbers: Analog: 50 (UHF, 1981–2009); Digital: 32 (UHF, until 2018), 28 (UHF, 2018–2019), 39 (UHF, 2019–2020)
- Former affiliations: Independent (1981–2011); Azteca América (2011–2021); Estrella TV (2021–2024); ShopHQ (2024–2025); Fubo Sports Network (2025–2026)
- Call sign meaning: Originally used on the current KOFY-TV

Technical information
- Licensing authority: FCC
- Facility ID: 34440
- ERP: 1,000 kW
- HAAT: 511.7 m (1,679 ft)
- Transmitter coordinates: 37°45′19″N 122°27′10″W

Links
- Public license information: Public file; LMS

KEMO-TV (channel 50) is a television station licensed to Fremont, California, United States, serving the San Francisco Bay Area with programming from the shopping network QVC. The station is owned by Innovate Corp. and maintains studios on Christie Avenue in Emeryville; its transmitter is located at San Francisco's Sutro Tower, shared with KMTP-TV, KCNS, and KTNC-TV.

== History ==
The station first went on the air in 1972, as KFTY (for channel number 50). Originally licensed to Santa Rosa, it quickly attracted eager young broadcasters who honed their craft and went on to bigger markets. Among the Channel 50 pioneers were Jon Miller, now the longtime play-by-play voice of the San Francisco Giants, and Stan Atkinson, who would become one of the Sacramento area's best-known TV reporters and anchors.

This much anticipated effort to establish a local North Bay TV station in Santa Rosa, led by Atkinson and partner Kit Spier (formerly an executive at KNBC in Los Angeles), was under-financed and lasted only a year. The station was off the air more than it was on, and after the novelty of a new TV station wore off, viewers had little confidence and the station went dark.

Nothing more happened until 1981, when Wishard Brown, who had owned the Marin Independent Journal newspaper and San Rafael radio station KTIM, revived Channel 50 with an eye to making it a local news authority.

The second incarnation of KFTY went live in a former furniture store on Mendocino Avenue on May 15, 1981, with broadcaster Jim Johnson (now an independent insurance and investment broker in Santa Rosa) as general manager.

A news department was formed with Bob Sherwood, formerly of KGO-TV (channel 7), as the station's first news director, and Rod Sherry, then a veteran KPIX anchor, as the weekend anchor and later news producer. Some of the news reporters included Deb Sherwood, Fred Wayne, Karen Clinton, Karen Provenza, Ed Beebout, and Diane Kaufman.

Through the 1980s, the local news operation expanded and became a training ground for more future big-market broadcasters such as Bill Martin, the veteran KTVU (channel 2) meteorologist, Manuel Gallegos, who went to CBS, Fred Wayne, who went to KCBS in San Francisco, and sportscaster Dale Julian, who later went to the then San Jose Mercury News.

KFTY's newscasts adopted the slogan, "We do it twice, every night," upon expanding its weeknight news reports to 7:30 and 10:30 p.m. The North Bay News was a very popular look at regional stories that the TV stations in the central San Francisco Bay Area rarely covered; KFTY also shared video tape of local news stories with other TV stations.

The third incarnation of KFTY took hold in the mid-1990s, when KFTY was sold to the Ackerley Group in 1996 and then to the television arm of Clear Channel Communications (now iHeartMedia) in 2002; that company, after being bought out by private equity firms, announced the sale of KFTY and its other television stations on November 16, 2006. On January 26, 2007, weeks after Clear Channel announced plans to sell its stations, station manager John Burgess was ordered to shut down the news department, much to the disappointment of viewers in Sonoma, Marin, Napa, and Mendocino counties. Some of the reporters went to other TV stations, some retired, and some moved into other careers. Anchor Ed Beebout is now a communications professor at Sonoma State University, and reporter Curtiss Kim is now a news anchor at KSRO (1350 AM) in Santa Rosa.

On April 20, 2007, Clear Channel entered into an agreement to sell its entire television station group to Providence Equity Partners' Newport Television. Providence initially announced that it would not keep KFTY or sister station KVOS-TV in Bellingham, Washington; instead, those stations were to be turned over to LK Station Group.

Because LK could not obtain financing for the purchase, KFTY was instead sold to High Plains Broadcasting (Providence could not keep KFTY because it held a 19 percent ownership stake in Univision Communications, which already owns two stations in the Bay Area market, KDTV-DT channel 14 and KFSF-DT channel 66). Newport Television began managing KFTY through a joint sales agreement (JSA), though High Plains controlled KFTY's programming.

On April 25, 2011, KFTY affiliated with the classic television network MeTV as part of an affiliation agreement between the network and Newport. Branded as "MeTV Bay Area", KFTY aired MeTV programming from 10 a.m. to 11 p.m. on weekdays. In addition to MeTV programming, KFTY also carried syndicated and locally produced programming, including the weekday morning talk show Armstrong & Getty (a radio simulcast from KNEW, which aired from 6 to 10 a.m.), news and weather segments known as "Headlines and Weather on the Hour" that aired throughout the day (in addition to news segments anchored by Elisha Rivers that ran every half-hour during Armstrong & Getty), the Sunday evening discussion program YSN365 Sports Show hosted by Dave Cox, the community affairs program Your Turn, and the "pay-to-play" program TV 50 Marketplace, initially hosted by Nazy Javid and then by Angela Young.

The fourth incarnation of KFTY started on July 28, 2011, when High Plains Broadcasting announced plans to sell KFTY to Una Vez Más Holdings, LLC, with plans to affiliate KFTY with Azteca; The new owners changed the station's callsign to KEMO-TV, which was previously used as the callsign of KOFY-TV (channel 20) prior to 1986.

KEMO-TV logo as an Estrella TV affiliate, used from 2021 to 2024

On September 29, 2011, KFTY switched its affiliation to Azteca, becoming one of two affiliates of the Spanish-language network in the Bay Area – alongside KOFY, which carried Azteca on its 20.4 subchannel; KOFY dropped Azteca programming shortly afterward. The MeTV affiliation moved to KOFY digital subchannel 20.2 on October 17, 2011.

In 2014, Una Vez Mas' TV assets (including KEMO-TV) were then sold to Northstar Media, LLC. In turn, HC2 Holdings acquired Northstar Media in addition to Azteca América on November 29, 2017, making KEMO an Azteca owned-and-operated station.

On March 29, 2021, KEMO flipped its main .1 channel to Estrella TV and moved Azteca programming to its .2 subchannel where it remained until the network's demise. On April 1, 2024, KEMO dropped Estrella and switched its main channel to ShopHQ. Estrella moved to a series of low-power stations on virtual channel 30.1, led by San Francisco-based KMMC-LD. On February 1, 2025, KEMO dropped ShopHQ and switched its main channel to Fubo Sports Network as a result of a partnership between Fubo and Innovate Corp. subsidiary HC2 Broadcasting. In May 2026, KEMO flipped to QVC2.

== News operation ==
KFTY formed a news department in the late 1980s and began producing two half-hour local newscasts, airing at 7 and 10 p.m. each weeknight (these were promoted under the slogan, "We do it twice, every night"). KFTY cancelled these newscasts on January 26, 2007, citing insufficient revenue to support their continuation. Management denied the move was related to Clear Channel's intent to divest the station despite a similar incident at another Clear Channel station (WUTR in Utica, New York) in which all local newscasts on that station were canceled in August 2003, followed by the sale of WUTR in early 2004. After its news department was shut down, KFTY only produced hourly local news updates between regular programs.

KEMO-TV aired national newscasts produced by Estrella TV while it was an affiliate. It does not currently air any news programming.

== Technical information ==
=== Subchannels ===
Subchannels of KCNS, KMTP-TV, KTNC-TV, and KEMO-TV
License	Subchannel	Res.	Short name	Programming
KCNS	38.1	720p	KCNS	Shop LC
KCNS	38.2	480i	SkyLink	Sky Link TV
KCNS	38.3	480i	SBN	SonLife
KCNS	38.5	480i	QVC365	QVC 365
KCNS	38.6	480i	NTD Eng	NTD America
KMTP-TV	32.1	480i	KMTP	Non-commercial Independent
KTNC-TV	42.1	720p	KTNC	TCT
KTNC-TV	42.2	480i	JTV	Jewelry TV
KEMO-TV	50.1	720p	ShopHQ	QVC
KEMO-TV	50.2	720p	NTD	New Tang Dynasty Television
KEMO-TV	50.3	480i	KEMO	Estrella TV (KOFY-TV)
KEMO-TV	50.4	480i	Outlaw	Outlaw
KEMO-TV	50.5	480i	Timeles	Infomercials

Subchannel broadcast with MPEG-4 video
Simulcast of subchannels of another station

=== Analog-to-digital conversion ===
KEMO-TV (as KFTY) shut down its analog signal, over UHF channel 50, on February 17, 2009, the original date of the federally mandated transition from analog to digital television, which was later moved to June 12. The station's digital signal moved from its pre-transition UHF channel 54, which was among the high band UHF channels (52–69) that were removed from broadcasting use as a result of the transition, to UHF channel 32, using virtual channel 50.
