= KCNS =

Television station in San Francisco

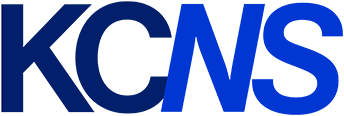
- San Francisco–Oakland–; San Jose, California; United States
- City: San Francisco, California
- Channels: Digital: 32 (UHF), shared with KMTP-TV, KTNC-TV and KEMO-TV; Virtual: 38

Programming
- Affiliations: 38.1: Shop LC; for others, see § Subchannels

Ownership
- Owner: WRNN-TV Associates; (RNN National, LLC)

History
- First air date: January 6, 1986
- Former call signs: KWBB (1986–1991)
- Former channel numbers: Analog: 38 (UHF, 1986–2009); Digital: 39 (UHF, until 2020)
- Former affiliations: Independent (1986–1998, 2020–2021); Shop at Home/Jewelry Television (1998–2007); Infomercials (January–April 2007); RTV (2007–2012); MundoFox/MundoMax (2012–2016); Sonlife (2016–2020)
- Call sign meaning: "Chinese Television" (for station's Asian language format at the time of call sign change)

Technical information
- Licensing authority: FCC
- Facility ID: 71586
- ERP: 1,000 kW
- HAAT: 511.7 m (1,679 ft)
- Transmitter coordinates: 37°45′19″N 122°27′10″W

Links
- Public license information: Public file; LMS

KCNS (channel 38) is a television station licensed to San Francisco, California, United States, serving the San Francisco Bay Area. Owned by WRNN-TV Associates, the station airs programming from Shop LC. KCNS shares its digital channel with KMTP-TV (channel 32), KTNC-TV (channel 42), and KEMO-TV (channel 50). Their transmitter is located atop Sutro Tower in San Francisco.

== History ==
=== KUDO and KVOF-TV ===
The first channel 38 signed on the air on December 28, 1968, as KUDO. With a lineup heavy on live and local shows, including financial programming during the morning and early afternoon hours and even an interview show hosted by Willie Mays, KUDO failed financially; it went bankrupt and fell dark on April 15, 1971.

Faith Center, managed by pastor Ray Schoch (1917–1977), acquired the station at a low price and returned it to the air in 1974 as KVOF-TV, carrying Christian programming for about 12 hours a day. Some shows were produced by Faith Center while others came from outside Christian groups. In 1975, the station expanded its programming to nearly 24 hours a day, when Dr. Gene Scott became pastor of Faith Center and assumed control of its television stations. By 1978, the station was only running programming from Scott's "University Network" 24 hours a day. However, the station lost its license, along with those of sister stations KHOF (99.5 FM) in Los Angeles and KHOF-TV in San Bernardino, after Faith Center refused to disclose its private donor records to the Federal Communications Commission (FCC) in a case over alleged misuse of funds for uses other than originally stated purposes.

=== West Coast United ===
The FCC's 1980 decision to deny a distress sale of KVOF-TV spurred three applications for new stations on channel 38, from West Coast United Broadcasting Company, Together Media Ministries (owned by the First Assembly of God of Fremont), and Carmel-based LDA Communications; this proceeding in turn depended on the renewal for the radio station. Administrative law judge Edward Kuhlmann dismissed KVOF-TV's renewal application in 1983 for failure to answer questions and produce documents that were necessary for the hearing. The initial decision that December gave the nod to West Coast United Broadcasting Company, whose Tacoma, Washington–based staff presented a superior proposal on integration of staff and management. Faith Center appealed the dismissal of its license application, but the FCC denied this in 1984 and gave the church 90 days to continue running KVOF-TV in order to wind up its affairs. Faith Center then attempted to have the Supreme Court of the United States hear a challenge to its losses; it refused.

KVOF-TV was given until January 2, 1986, to close. Scott warned viewers of his San Francisco successor, "Here comes the Tower of Babel religious brigade ... the voices like Oral Roberts, Jimmy Swaggart and Jerry Falwell preaching homosexuals into hell and beating the drum with the same claptrap you hear Sunday on every religious station in the country". KWBB began operation in January 1986, featuring secular and religious programs—including Scott, who purchased four hours every night. The deal with Scott also granted use of the San Bruno Mountain studio and transmitter facilities associated with the former KVOF-TV. In 1989, channel 38 moved to Sutro Tower, becoming the last new analog station to use the site.

=== KCNS ===
In May 1991, former KRON-TV anchor Jim Paymar became KWBB's general manager. The station changed its call sign to KCNS on June 24, 1991. It aired imported and locally produced shows in several Asian languages, including Chinese, Japanese, Filipino, Vietnamese and Korean. Based at studios in the former Hamm's Brewery, most of the local programs were produced by third parties. There was also home shopping programming during the day. While the station struggled to gain cable carriage at a time when there was no must-carry rule for local TV stations, it was able to reach agreements to produce a Cantonese-language simulcast of KRON's 6 p.m. newscast in 1992 and even several Oakland Athletics baseball games in 1993.

=== Home shopping and return to Chinese-language programming ===
In 1996, Ramcast Corporation bought KCNS from West Coast United for $30 million. Ramcast, a subsidiary of Global Broadcasting Systems, cut the station's Asian programming from 24 hours a day to three to add more home shopping. Global then went bankrupt in 1997; its assets were acquired by the Shop at Home Network for $77 million. This lasted until June 21, 2006, when the Shop at Home's parent, the E. W. Scripps Company, suspended the network's operations. KCNS switched to Jewelry Television, and two days later, it started broadcasting a mixture of programming from both networks, after Jewelry Television bought Shop at Home and resumed that network's operations.

On September 26, 2006, Multicultural Television announced it would purchase KCNS from Scripps as part of a deal to buy all of Scripps' Shop at Home stations for $170 million. Multicultural closed on KCNS and its sister stations in Cleveland and Raleigh on December 20, 2006. On January 14, 2007, KCNS ended its simulcast of Shop at Home and began carrying educational and informational programming on early weekday mornings and infomercials for the rest of the day. On April 8, 2007, KCNS began broadcasting Chinese language programming in Mandarin and Cantonese, under the "Sino TV" (華語電視 Huáyǔ Diànshì) banner nightly from 6 p.m. to midnight, including news programs in both Mandarin and Cantonese. The following day on April 9, 2007, KCNS began carrying programming from the Retro Television Network during the daytime hours.

=== Financial difficulties and sale to NRJ TV ===
After Multicultural ran into financial problems and defaulted on its loans, KCNS was placed into a trust; in 2011, the station, along with WMFP in Boston, was sold to NRJ TV (a company unrelated to European broadcaster NRJ Radio). The sale was consummated on May 13, 2011. A one-third equity stake in NRJ TV is held by Titan Broadcast Management, which also operates KTNC-TV (channel 42); Titan had already managed KCNS for some time prior to the sale. Titan exited its equity stake in NRJ TV in December 2017.

On August 13, 2012, KCNS became a charter affiliate of the Spanish language network MundoFox (later MundoMax). On September 1, 2016, KCNS became an affiliate of the SonLife Broadcasting Network, exiting MundoMax as it became clear it would no longer be a going concern within the next few months.

=== Sale to RNN ===
On December 9, 2019, it was announced that WRNN-TV Associates, owner of New York City–based WRNN-TV, secured a deal to purchase seven full-power TV stations (including KCNS) and one Class A station from NRJ. The sale was approved by the FCC on January 23, and was completed on February 4, 2020, breaking up NRJ's duopoly in the Bay Area, although KCNS and KTNC would continue channel sharing. Upon completion of the sale, the SonLife schedule shifted to another subchannel, and the station began to broadcast infomercials most of the day, along with a simulcast of WRNN's nightly talk show Richard French Live.

=== Return to home shopping ===
On May 20, 2021, RNN and iMedia Brands announced an agreement to affiliate most of RNN's television stations (including KCNS) with home shopping network ShopHQ. KCNS returned to home shopping programming, this time carrying ShopHQ programming, on June 28, 2021. Richard French Live continues to air, but in the mornings and retooled from its previous investigative news format.

iMedia Brands filed for Chapter 11 bankruptcy on June 28, 2023. On July 10, 2023, iMedia announced that it would sell its assets, including ShopHQ, to RNN Media Group for $50 million;. the deal was terminated in August in favor of a $55 million bid for ShopHQ by IV Brands, owned by Manoj Bhargava. In October 2023, KCNS switched to Shop LC.

== Technical information ==
=== Subchannels ===
Subchannels of KCNS, KMTP-TV, KTNC-TV, and KEMO-TV
License	Subchannel	Res.	Short name	Programming
KCNS	38.1	720p	KCNS	Shop LC
KCNS	38.2	480i	SkyLink	Sky Link TV
KCNS	38.3	480i	SBN	SonLife
KCNS	38.5	480i	QVC365	QVC 365
KCNS	38.6	480i	NTD Eng	NTD America
KMTP-TV	32.1	480i	KMTP	Non-commercial Independent
KTNC-TV	42.1	720p	KTNC	TCT
KTNC-TV	42.2	480i	JTV	Jewelry TV
KEMO-TV	50.1	720p	ShopHQ	QVC
KEMO-TV	50.2	720p	NTD	New Tang Dynasty Television
KEMO-TV	50.3	480i	KEMO	Estrella TV (KOFY-TV)
KEMO-TV	50.4	480i	Outlaw	Outlaw
KEMO-TV	50.5	480i	Timeles	Infomercials

Subchannel broadcast with MPEG-4 video
Simulcast of subchannels of another station

=== Analog-to-digital conversion ===
KCNS shut down its analog signal, over UHF channel 38, on February 17, 2009, as part of the federally mandated transition from analog to digital television (the deadline was later moved to June 12). The station's digital signal remained on its pre-transition UHF channel 39, using virtual channel 38.
