= KLFA =

KLFA may refer to:

- KLFA-LD, a low-power television station (channel 25) licensed to serve Santa Maria, California, United States
- Kuala Lumpur FA
- Kenya Land and Freedom Army
