= KXLA =

Television station in Rancho Palos Verdes, California

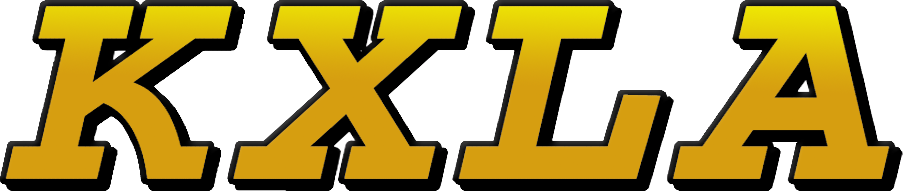
- Rancho Palos Verdes–Los Angeles, California; United States
- City: Rancho Palos Verdes, California
- Channels: Digital: 30 (UHF), shared with KJLA; Virtual: 44

Programming
- Affiliations: 44.1: Ethnic Independent; for others, see § Subchannels

Ownership
- Owner: Ronald Ulloa; (Rancho Palos Verdes Broadcasters, Inc.)
- Sister stations: KSGA-LD, KVMD, KJLA

History
- First air date: December 2000
- Former call signs: KRPA (2000–2001)
- Former channel numbers: Analog: 44 (UHF, 2000–2009); Digital: 51 (UHF, 2003–2019)
- Former affiliations: America One (2000–2001)
- Call sign meaning: KX Los Angeles

Technical information
- Licensing authority: FCC
- Facility ID: 55083
- ERP: 1,000 kW
- HAAT: 947 m (3,107 ft)
- Transmitter coordinates: 34°13′35.3″N 118°4′0.9″W

Links
- Public license information: Public file; LMS
- Website: www.kxlatv.com

KXLA (channel 44) is an ethnic independent television station licensed to Rancho Palos Verdes, California, United States, serving the Los Angeles area. The station is owned by Rancho Palos Verdes Broadcasters, Inc., whose president and majority owner, Ronald Ulloa, also owns Twentynine Palms–licensed KVMD (channel 31). KXLA's studios are located on Corinth Avenue (near Interstate 405) in West Los Angeles, and its transmitter is located atop Mount Wilson.

== Overview ==
The station first signed on the air in December 2000 as KRPA as an affiliate of America One. The station changed its call letters to KXLA on August 8, 2001, with ethnic programming. The KXLA call sign was previously used by the Pasadena radio station now known as KWVE.

KXLA's transmitter was originally located on Catalina Island at 33°20′59.5″N 118°21′9.4″W, but in 2004 it was moved to Mount Wilson, where most of the other stations in the Los Angeles market transmit.

On May 10, 2018, KXLA's main signal transitioned from 4:3 to 16:9, which allowed local programming and their local newscasts to be broadcast in widescreen.

== In popular culture ==
The KXLA call letters were used in fictional form by the television station featured in the film The China Syndrome and the Bewitched TV spinoff Tabitha, with Lisa Hartman-Black in the title role. The call sign was also used by a radio station in the movie Joe Dirt.

== Technical information ==
=== Subchannels ===
KXLA presents eight subchannels on the multiplex shared with KJLA:

Subchannels of KXLA and KJLA
License	Subchannel	Res.	Short name	Programming
KXLA	44.1	720p	KXLA-DT	Main KXLA programming
KXLA	44.3	480i	SKYLINK	Sky Link TV Channel 3 (Mandarin) (4:3)
KXLA	44.4	480i	SKY-CAN	Sky Link TV Channel 2 (Cantonese) (4:3)
KXLA	44.6	480i	NTD	NTD America (4:3)
KXLA	44.7	480i	NTDTV	New Tang Dynasty TV (Mandarin) (4:3)
KXLA	44.8	480i	EEE TV	EEE TV (Spanish) (4:3)
KXLA	44.9	480i	FINN-TV	FINN TV USA (Sinhala) (4:3)
KJLA	57.1	720p	KJLA	Main KJLA programming
KJLA	57.2	480i	VFACE	VietFace TV (Vietnamese) (4:3)
KJLA	57.3	480i	VNA	VNA TV (Vietnamese) (4:3)
KJLA	57.4	480i	VietSky	VietSky Television (Vietnamese) (4:3)
KJLA	57.5	480i	STV	Saigon TV (Vietnamese) (4:3)
KJLA	57.6	480i	VBS	VBS TV (Vietnamese) (4:3)
KJLA	57.9	480i	ZWTV	Chung T'ien TV (Mandarin) (4:3)
KJLA	57.10	480i	SBTN	SBTN (Vietnamese) (4:3)
KJLA	57.12	480i	VGMT	Viet Global Mall TV (Vietnamese) (4:3)
KJLA	57.15	480i	SBU-TV	SBU-TV (Vietnamese) (4:3)

=== Analog-to-digital conversion ===
KXLA shut down its analog signal, over UHF channel 44, on June 12, 2009, as part of the federally mandated transition from analog to digital television. The station's digital signal remained on its pre-transition UHF channel 51, using virtual channel 44.
