= KJLA =

Television station in Ventura, California

- Ventura–Los Angeles, California; United States
- City: Ventura, California
- Channels: Digital: 30 (UHF), shared with KXLA; Virtual: 57

Programming
- Affiliations: 57.1: Spanish Religious; for others, see § Subchannels

Ownership
- Owner: Costa de Oro Media, LLC; (Walter Ulloa); (KJLA, LLC)
- Sister stations: KVMD, KXLA

History
- First air date: October 1, 1990
- Former call signs: KSTV-TV (1990–1998)
- Former channel numbers: Analog: 57 (UHF, 1990–2008); Digital: 49 (UHF, 2005–2017); 51 (UHF, 2017–2019)
- Former affiliations: Galavision (1990–1995); The WB (1995–1998); Spanish Independent (1998–2007); LATV (2007–2017); Azteca América (2018–2021); Visión Latina (2022–2024)
- Call sign meaning: Los Angeles

Technical information
- Licensing authority: FCC
- Facility ID: 14000
- ERP: 670 kW; 1,000 kW (CP)
- HAAT: 947 m (3,107 ft)
- Transmitter coordinates: 34°13′35.3″N 118°4′0.9″W
- Translator(s): see § Translators

Links
- Public license information: Public file; LMS
- Website: www.kjla.com

KJLA (channel 57) is a Spanish-language religious independent television station licensed to Ventura, California, United States, serving the Los Angeles area. The station is owned by Costa de Oro Media, LLC, a company run by Entravision Communications founder, CEO and chairman Walter Ulloa (whose brother, Ronald Ulloa, owns ethnic independent KXLA (channel 44) and KVMD (channel 31)). KJLA's studios are located on Corinth Avenue (near Interstate 405) in West Los Angeles, and its transmitter is located atop Mount Wilson.

KJLA operates two low-power repeater stations: KLFA-LD (channel 25) in Santa Maria and KFUL-LD (channel 23) in San Luis Obispo (both are part of the Santa Barbara market). In addition to carrying Spanish-language programming on its main channel, the station also carries various networks broadcasting in Vietnamese and Mandarin on separate digital subchannels.

== History ==
The station first signed on the air on October 1, 1990, as KSTV-TV. It was the second attempt to operate a television station in Ventura; the first, KKOG-TV (channel 16), operated from December 14, 1968, to September 13, 1969, with a schedule of entirely live, local programming. KSTV-TV was originally owned by Costa de Oro Television, Inc., and originally aired Spanish-language programming as an affiliate of Galavisión. The station signed on a low-power translator in Santa Maria in 1992.

In 1994, Walter Ulloa purchased Costa de Oro Television and KSTV-TV, intending to increase its transmitting power and extend its signal to better reach to the Los Angeles area. However, although Ventura is considered part of the Los Angeles market, Federal Communications Commission (FCC) rules at the time placed KSTV-TV within the Santa Barbara–Santa Maria–San Luis Obispo market, similar to the situation of KADY-TV channel 63 in Oxnard, California (now Garden Grove-licensed KWHY), which became Santa Barbara's UPN affiliate when the network launched in January 1995. Unable to get cable coverage in the Los Angeles area, on November 1, 1995, KSTV switched to an English-language format and became the WB affiliate for the Santa Barbara market.

Logo for "LATV", the bilingual programming block produced by KJLA, until December 31, 2017.

However, the station continued in its attempts to enter the Los Angeles market. In July 1997, KSTV increased its effective radiated power to 5,000 kilowatts. The improved signal helped the station to obtain must-carry status on most cable providers in western Los Angeles County in February 1998. However, because Los Angeles already had a WB-affiliated station, KTLA (channel 5), KSTV-TV was forced to disaffiliate from the network. In the spring of 1998, the station relocated its studios and offices from Ventura to West Los Angeles.

The station changed its call letters to KJLA on July 20, 1998, to further reflect its intentions to serve the Los Angeles market. On that date, KJLA became an independent station and adopted a split-scheduled format. The station began carrying financial news programming under the brand Business News 22 acquired from KWHY-TV, later BizNews 1 on weekday mornings and afternoons. Business news returned to KWHY-TV, this time only on its digital signal, in 2000, and was later dropped by KJLA.

In November 2001, the Simi Valley translator was moved to Mount Wilson and started broadcasting to Los Angeles as KSMV-LP on channel 33. Ironically, the original low power translator in Simi Valley operated on channel 44, which caused interference with full power "cousin" station KRPA (now KXLA) which prompted the change to channel 33. Soon after, Trinity Broadcasting Network sought to move KTBN-TV's digital operation from channel 23 to channel 33, to avoid co-channel interference from the digital signals of KVMD (another "cousin" of KJLA) in the Inland Empire and San Diego CW affiliate XETV, now a repeater of XHGC-TDT. KTBN's move to channel 33 was authorized on February 5, 2009, ultimately displacing KSMV-LP to KTBN's former digital channel, 23. KSMV-LP soon flash-cut to digital and started rebroadcasting KVMD to the Los Angeles area.

The following year in 2001, the station began branding its Spanish language programming block under the name LATV. In April 2007, LATV transitioned from a programming block on KJLA into a national network; it became distributed to several television stations (mainly carried on digital subchannels and low-power stations, with the subchannels of four stations owned by Post-Newsweek Stations and those owned by Entravision Communications among the network's charter affiliates).

Former KJLA logo used from January 1, 2018, to December 31, 2021.

In December 2017, it was announced that the station would become the Los Angeles market's Azteca América affiliate on January 3, 2018, replacing KAZA-TV, thus sister station KVMD became the new affiliate of LATV in the Los Angeles market on January 1, 2018. Although the official switch to Azteca was not until January 3, the station started airing the majority of the network's programming on January 1 with an exception of shows that aired at the same time as KJLA's religious programming, which continued to air on the network until March. Various Azteca programs were delayed or not shown at all in order to make place for KJLA's religious program Cambia Tu Vida, which aired various times a day. The program was removed from KJLA's schedule on March 19, 2018, and the station begin airing Azteca's entire schedule "live" and in pattern. On January 1, 2022, the station dropped its affiliation with Azteca America and starting airing religious programming from Visión Latina and Universal Church; Azteca moved its affiliation to a subchannel of KWHY-TV until the network ceased operations on December 31, 2022.

== Technical information ==
=== Subchannels ===
Subchannels of KXLA and KJLA
License	Subchannel	Res.	Short name	Programming
KXLA	44.1	720p	KXLA-DT	Main KXLA programming
KXLA	44.3	480i	SKYLINK	Sky Link TV Channel 3 (Mandarin) (4:3)
KXLA	44.4	480i	SKY-CAN	Sky Link TV Channel 2 (Cantonese) (4:3)
KXLA	44.6	480i	NTD	NTD America (4:3)
KXLA	44.7	480i	NTDTV	New Tang Dynasty TV (Mandarin) (4:3)
KXLA	44.8	480i	EEE TV	EEE TV (Spanish) (4:3)
KXLA	44.9	480i	FINN-TV	FINN TV USA (Sinhala) (4:3)
KJLA	57.1	720p	KJLA	Main KJLA programming
KJLA	57.2	480i	VFACE	VietFace TV (Vietnamese) (4:3)
KJLA	57.3	480i	VNA	VNA TV (Vietnamese) (4:3)
KJLA	57.4	480i	VietSky	VietSky Television (Vietnamese) (4:3)
KJLA	57.5	480i	STV	Saigon TV (Vietnamese) (4:3)
KJLA	57.6	480i	VBS	VBS TV (Vietnamese) (4:3)
KJLA	57.9	480i	ZWTV	Chung T'ien TV (Mandarin) (4:3)
KJLA	57.10	480i	SBTN	SBTN (Vietnamese) (4:3)
KJLA	57.12	480i	VGMT	Viet Global Mall TV (Vietnamese) (4:3)
KJLA	57.15	480i	SBU-TV	SBU-TV (Vietnamese) (4:3)

=== Translators ===
- KFUL-LD San Luis Obispo

=== Analog-to-digital conversion ===
KJLA had applied to convert to a digital-only signal, citing low over-the-air analog viewership rates and high operating costs to maintain the simulcast; this request was refused by the FCC on February 9, 2005. The higher operating costs were in part due to KJLA having two different transmitter sites. The station's analog transmitter was located on South Mountain near Santa Paula in Ventura County; the facilities for its digital signal are located on Mount Wilson in Los Angeles County.

KJLA shut down its analog signal, over UHF channel 57, on August 27, 2008. The station's digital signal remained on its pre-transition UHF channel 49, using virtual channel 57. KJLA is the second television station in the Los Angeles market to discontinue its analog signal before the digital transition in 2009, after KVMD, which shut down its analog signal in 2003.

==== Channel sharing trial ====
In February 2014, KJLA and PBS member station KLCS (channel 58) were granted special temporary authority by the FCC to conduct trials in partnership with CTIA and the Association of Public Television Stations, in which the two stations would conduct a test of the H.264 video codec for digital television transmission, and more importantly, the ability and viability of broadcasting two sets of television services within the same 6 MHz channel band. These tests came as the FCC prepared to perform a spectrum auction in 2015 (which was delayed to sometime in 2016 that November), in which television station operators would be able to voluntarily sell their broadcast spectrum to the government, and then receive profits from its sale to wireless providers. An FCC spokesperson stated that channel sharing would allow broadcasters to "[take] advantage of the incentive auction’s once-in-a-lifetime financial opportunity", while still maintaining its ability to run over-the-air television programming.
