= Sutro Tower =

TV and radio antenna tower in San Francisco

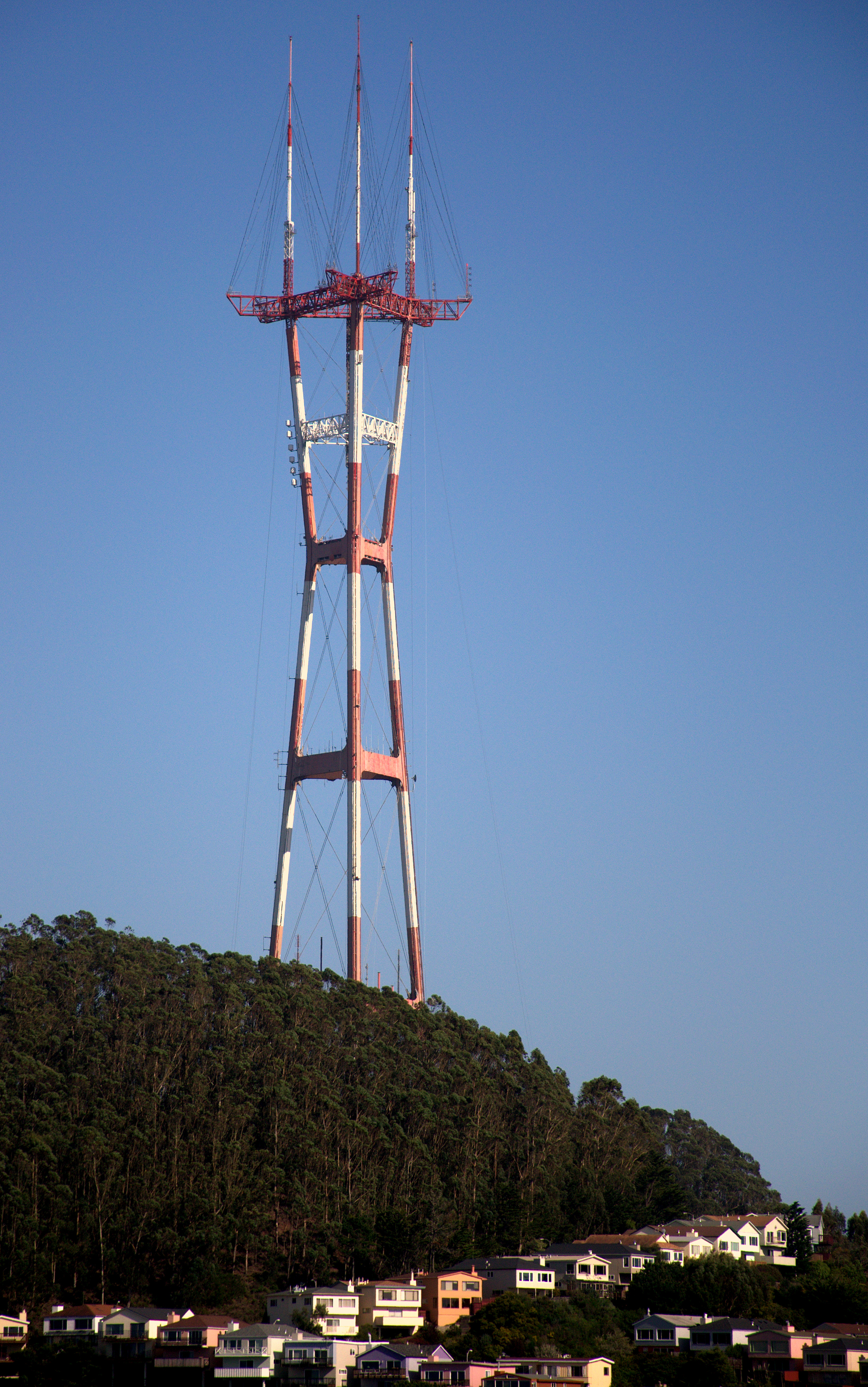
- Sutro Tower viewed from Grandview Park in San Francisco

- Location within San Francisco

General information
- Status: Completed
- Type: Radio mast
- Location: San Francisco, California, 1 La Avanzada Street; Clarendon Heights
- Coordinates: 37.75523°N 122.45284°W
- Elevation: 254.2 m (834 ft)
- Construction started: 1971
- Completed: July 4, 1973
- Owner: Sutro Tower, Inc.

Height
- Antenna spire: 297.8 m (977 ft)
- Observatory: on Level 6, 228.8 m (751 ft) above base

Dimensions
- Other dimensions: base triangle legs spaced 45.7 m (150 ft) on a side; waist triangle legs spaced 18.3 m (60 ft) on a side; antenna triangle spaced 30.5 m (100 ft) on a side

Technical details
- Structural system: Truss tower

Design and construction
- Architect: Furman L. Anderson Jr.
- Architecture firm: Kline Iron & Steel; Albert C. Martin and Associates

Renovating team
- Engineer: Simpson Gumpertz & Heger

Website
- sutrotower.com

Sutro Tower is a unique three-legged 297.8 m (977 ft) tall TV and radio lattice tower located on the West Side of San Francisco, California. Rising from a hill between Twin Peaks and Mount Sutro near Clarendon Heights, it is a prominent feature of the city skyline and a landmark for city residents and visitors. The tower was the tallest structure in San Francisco from the time of its completion in 1973 until it was surpassed by the Salesforce Tower in 2018.

The tower is named after Mount Sutro. Adolph Gilbert Sutro, grandson of former mayor Adolph Sutro, built a mansion, La Avanzada, on the family property in the highest peaks of San Francisco. In 1948, the mansion and property were sold to the American Broadcasting Company, where it became the original home of their San Francisco operation as KGO Television. KGO then formed a consortium with KTVU, KRON, and KPIX, the three other major San Francisco television broadcasters at the time, to build and maintain the tower. It stands 297.8 m (977 ft) above ground and 552 m (1,811 ft) above sea level. It is the second tallest structure in the city by ground-to-tip height, though its mountain location overlooks the city's downtown skyscrapers.

== History ==
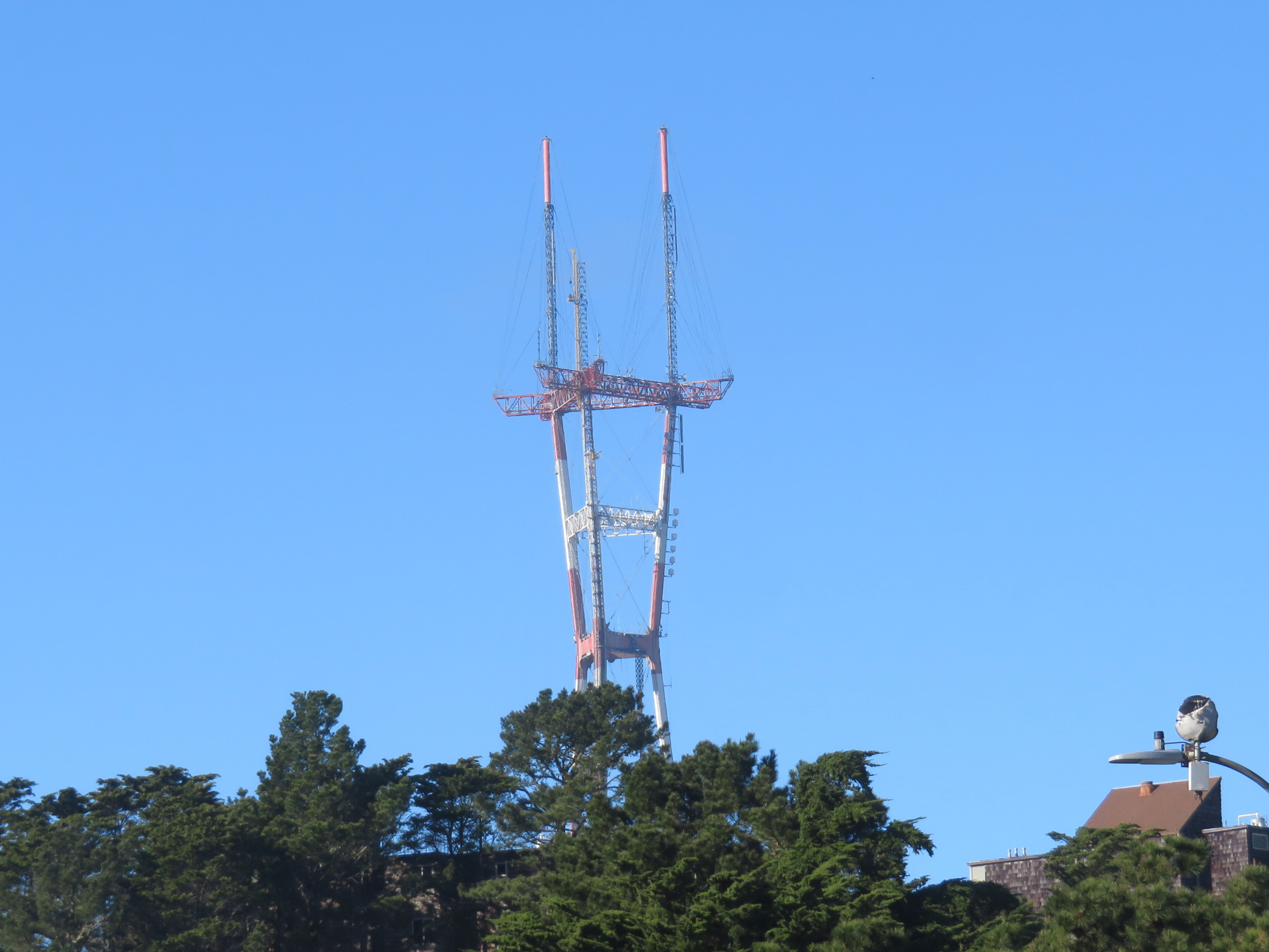
The tower in 2020 during antenna modifications

Before the construction of Sutro Tower in 1973, television reception in San Francisco was spotty because the many hills of the city blocked the line-of-sight television signal. The great height of the new tower helped to resolve that problem. Transmitters had been scattered throughout the Bay Area, including at San Bruno Mountain, Mt. Allison, Monument Peak, and Mt. Diablo. By having all the main Bay Area television station transmitters in one location, reception was improved by allowing a receiving antenna pointed in a single direction to receive all those stations rather than a subset.

Local residents opposed the tower even before it was completed, including criticism of the aesthetic effect the tower would have on the rest of San Francisco. San Francisco writer Herb Caen once wrote, "I keep waiting for it to stalk down the hill and attack the Golden Gate Bridge."

When first built, the long legs of the tower were illuminated at night with long tubes of white light that looked like long fluorescent tubes. However, public outcry resulted in the lights being removed soon after they were turned on. Despite the initial revulsion of some residents, Sutro Tower is now recognized by many as a Bay Area icon. A local entertainment guide, SF Station, uses it as a logo, as does the collaborative art game SFZero. In 2022, Sutro Tower was included in the video game Horizon Forbidden West as one of the prominent landmarks in the San Francisco area.

Beginning in 2019, one of the three upper antenna assemblies was temporarily removed for the installation of new antennas for the FCC spectrum repacking. Antenna installation for the repacking was completed on May 1, 2020. Additionally, "To accommodate some final project cleanup work, some stations will broadcast from their auxiliary antennas intermittently between mid-July and mid-August."

== Construction ==
Construction began in 1971 by Kline Towers of Columbia, South Carolina. The tower was completed in 1973, with the first transmissions on July 4, 1973. Approximately 3,750 m^{3} (132,000 cu ft) of concrete were used to make the foundation of the 1,700 ton (3.7 million pound) tower. Earthquake proofing includes ballasting two-thirds of the weight of the structure below ground, resulting in a center of gravity at sixteen feet below ground level. It is used to transmit the signals of ten television stations and four FM radio stations and for various other communications services.

The tower is owned by Sutro Tower Inc., a nonprofit corporation, which in turn is owned by a consortium of the four major television broadcasters in San Francisco at the time of its construction: KTVU (previously owned by Cox Media Group, now owned by Fox Television Stations); KRON-TV (owned by the San Francisco Chronicle at the time of the tower's completion, now owned by Nexstar Media Group); KPIX (a former Westinghouse Broadcasting property, now owned by CBS); and KGO-TV (an ABC-owned station). Sutro Tower also leases space to other Bay Area radio and television stations, including PBS outlet KQED; independent station KOFY-TV; non-commercial station KPJK; and KPYX, a sister station to KPIX. With the advent of channel-sharing agreements after the 2016 FCC spectrum auction, San Jose's KQEH began to transmit from Sutro with sister station KQED on January 17, 2018, moving from its former Monument Peak transmitter.

Three other major Bay Area TV stations are unable to be located at Sutro Tower—the NBC-owned duopoly of KNTV and KSTS; and KTVU's duopoly partner KICU-TV. KNTV, which assumed the area's NBC affiliation from KRON-TV in 2002, relocated its transmitter from Loma Prieta Peak to San Bruno Mountain, five miles (8 km) south of Sutro Tower; KSTS and KICU-TV transmit from east of Fremont. Those locations allow these stations to maintain primary coverage over San Jose and the South Bay, as San Jose is the city of license for all three stations.

== Access ==
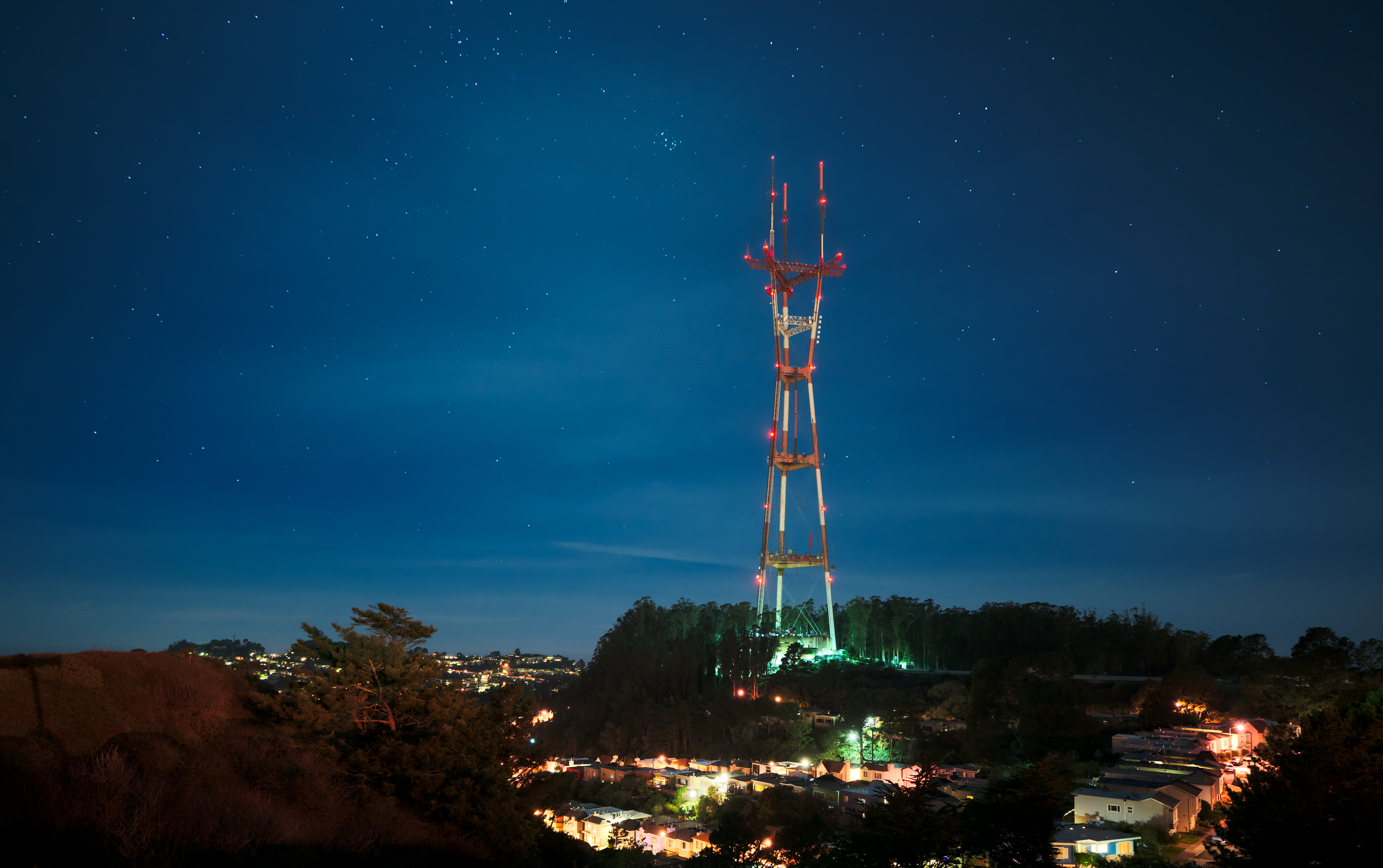
Night view

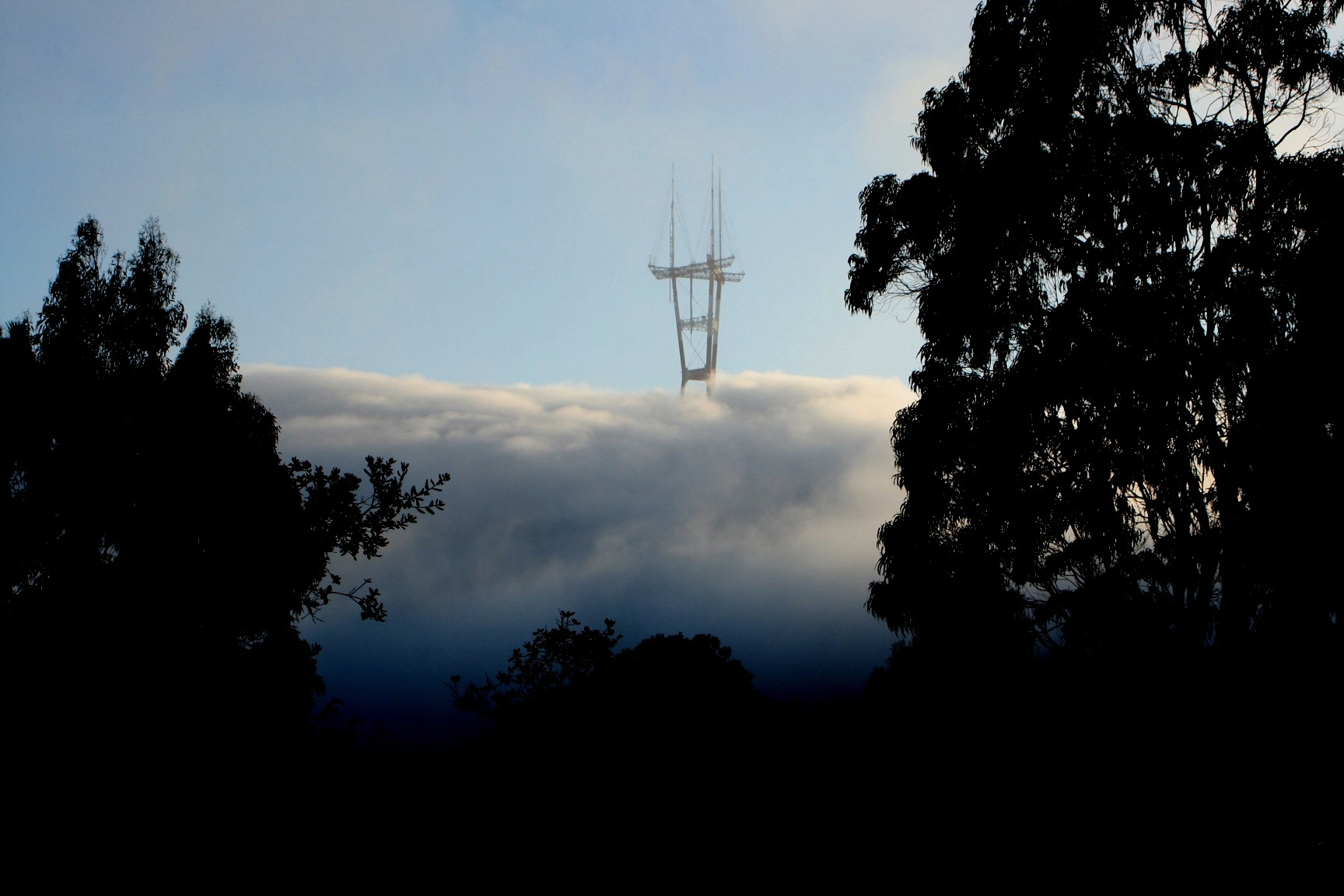
Seen above the coastal fog

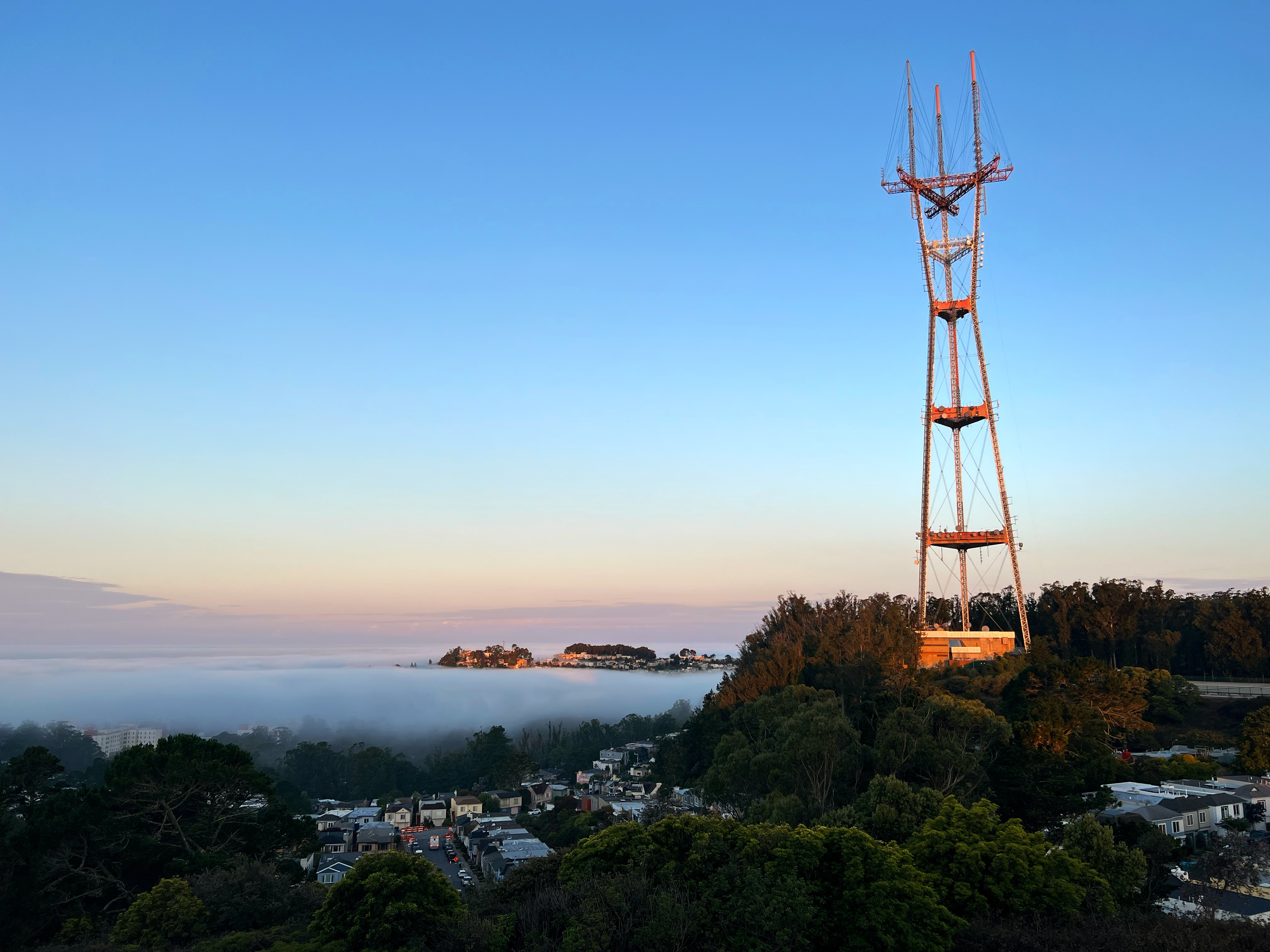
Sunrise from the top of Twin Peaks

The facility is accessible only by authorized vehicles. The area near the site offers panoramic viewpoints of San Francisco. There is a platform near the top of the tower, 232 m (761 ft) above ground and 486.2 m (1,595 ft) above sea level. Only authorized maintenance workers can access the tower via a small two-person elevator that runs inside the west tower enclosed leg. There is no public access within the Sutro Tower property lines.

On a clear day, the tower can be seen from the East Bay peak of Mount Diablo and is sometimes the only part of San Francisco seen above the coastal fog when it is blown inland, typically on summer mornings and evenings.

== Stations ==
=== Television ===
TV stations that transmit from Sutro Tower include the following. Most of these stations carry additional subchannels on their frequencies. Subchannel affiliations are shown via the digital channels link.

Callsign	Virtual channel	Physical channel	Affiliation	Digital channels	Online?
KTVU	2	26	Fox	2.1–2.4	✔︎
KURK-LD	3; 26	3	REL	3.1-3.10; 26.2	✘
KRON-TV	4	7	The CW	4.1–4.5	✔︎
KPIX	5	29	CBS	5.1–5.4	✔︎
KGO-TV	7	12	ABC	7.1–7.3	✔︎
KQED; KQEH	9 54	30	PBS	9.1–9.4; 54.1-54.4	✔︎
KQSL-LD	17; 26	4	REL	17.1-17.10; 26.2	✘
KRCB	22	5	PBS	22.1-22.3	✔︎
KCNS; KTNC-TV; KEMO-TV	38; 42; 50	32	Shop LC (KCNS); TCT (KTNC); ShopHQ (KEMO)	38.1–38.6; 42.1-42.2; 50.1-50.3	✔︎
KPYX	44	28	Independent	44.1-44.5	✔︎
KQTA-LD; KAAP-LD; KTSF; KMMC-LD; KDTS-LD	15; 24; 26; 30; 52	14	JTV; Diya TV; Ind. (KTSF); Estrella TV; Daystar	15.1-15.10; 24.1, 24.4, 24.5, 24.7; 26.11; 30.1, 30.2; 52.1, 52.2	✔︎
KPJK	60	27	Public Ind.	60.1–60.6	✔︎
KFSF	66	34	UniMás	66.1–66.5	✔︎

=== Radio ===
FM stations that transmit from Sutro Tower include KEXC (Formerly KREV) (92.7), KOIT (96.5), KSOL (98.9), KOSF (103.7), and KNBR-FM (104.5).

== See also ==
- Lattice tower
- List of tallest freestanding steel structures
- List of famous transmission sites
