= KCNZ-CD =

Television station in San Francisco

- San Francisco–Oakland–San Jose, California; United States
- City: San Francisco, California
- Channels: Digital: 21 (UHF), shared with KOFY-TV and KMPX-LD); Virtual: 28

Programming
- Affiliations: 28.1: LATV; for others, see § Subchannels

Ownership
- Owner: CNZ Communications; (Poquito Mas Communications LLC)
- Sister stations: KOFY-TV, KMPX-LD

History
- Founded: April 25, 1986
- First air date: May 3, 1994
- Former call signs: K30BI (1986–1999); KBIT-LP (1999–2001); KBIT-CA (2001–2004); KFTL-CA (2004–2010); KFTL-CD (2010–2017)
- Former channel numbers: Analog: 30 (UHF, 1994-1999), 28 (UHF, 1999-2010); Digital: 28 (UHF, 2010-2020)
- Former affiliations: The Box (1994–1995); Network One (1995–1997); Spanish Independent (1995–2002); HSN (2002–2010); Family Educational Television (2004–2013); ShopHQ (2013–2020); Quest (2020–2021)
- Call sign meaning: CNZ Communications

Technical information
- Licensing authority: FCC
- Facility ID: 52887
- Class: CD
- ERP: 15 kW
- HAAT: 377.2 m (1,238 ft)
- Transmitter coordinates: 37°41′14.4″N 122°26′5.3″W

Links
- Public license information: Public file; LMS

KCNZ-CD (channel 28) is a low-power, Class A television station licensed to San Francisco, California, United States, serving the San Francisco Bay Area. Owned by CNZ Communications, LLC, it is sister to Estrella TV affiliate KOFY-TV (channel 20) and low-power station KMPX-LD (channel 18). The three stations share transmitter facilities atop San Bruno Mountain.

== History ==
KCNZ-CD was founded on April 25, 1986, with an original construction permit granted to National Innovative Programming Network. Initially assigned to Palo Alto and Los Altos, California, and given callsign K30BI, the station's construction permit was modified and extended several times. In August 1990, Channel America acquired the station, but sold it again in July 1992 to Polar Broadcasting, who finally licensed the station on May 3, 1994. By this time, the station had been assigned to San Francisco, Oakland and San Jose.

According to listings from 1997, K30BI (referred to as "KBI-TV") was formerly affiliated with The Box, a 24-hour-a-day music network, and aired classic television during the day. It offered a Korean-language local newscast and a Spanish-language call-in show, as well as Spanish-language preseason broadcasts of San Francisco 49ers football. It was the only Korean-language TV station in San Francisco and its only independent Spanish-language outlet.

In 1999, the station relocated to channel 28 to make way for KQED's digital signal on channel 30 and rebranded as "Tu Vision" (Spanish for "Your Vision"). Its studios were originally located in the Cannery on Fisherman's Wharf, San Francisco. In 2000, KBI moved its studios to San Jose, a bid to move the station closer to the locus of the Hispanic community in the Bay Area.

Eventually, the station changed affiliations to HSN; its call letters were changed to KBIT-LP shortly after. KBIT received Class A status on August 27, 2001, and assumed the call sign KFTL-CA in February 2004 after being taken over by Family Stations, Inc. Family Stations previously used the KFTL call sign on analog channel 64, licensed to Stockton, which is now UniMás owned-and-operated station KTFK-DT.

KFTL-CA flash cut to digital on June 27, 2009; its call sign was changed to KFTL-CD.

Family Stations sold KFTL-CD to LocusPoint Networks in November 2012.

The station was purchased by CNZ Communications subsidiary Poquito Más Communications in mid-2017 and changed the call sign to KCNZ-CD on August 7, 2017.

== Subchannels ==
Subchannels of KCNZ-CD, KMPX-LD, and KOFY-TV
License	Channel	Res.	Short name	Programming
KCNZ-CD	28.1	720p	KCNZ-CD	LATV
KCNZ-CD	28.2	480i	MariaV	Mariavision
KCNZ-CD	28.4	480i	JTV	Jewelry TV
KCNZ-CD	28.5	480i	JTV	Jewelry TV
KCNZ-CD	28.6	480i	ShopLC	Shop LC
KMPX-LD	18.1	480i	KMPX-LD	Jewelry TV
KOFY-TV	20.1	720p	KOFY-DT	Estrella TV
KOFY-TV	20.2	720p	Grit	Hot 97 TV
KOFY-TV	20.3	480i	PosiTiV	Positiv
KOFY-TV	20.6	480i	RCTV	Rare Collectibles TV
KOFY-TV	20.7	480i	CRTV	CRTV
KOFY-TV	20.8	480i	FunRoad	Fun Roads

Subchannel broadcast with MPEG-4 video

== See also ==
- KEAR (AM)
- KEBR (FM)
