= KVMD =

Television station in Twentynine Palms, California

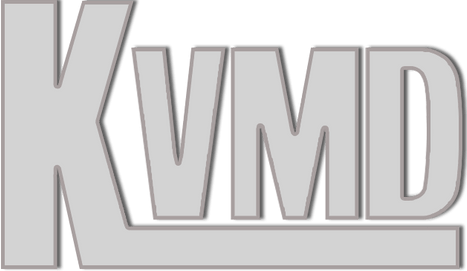
- Twentynine Palms–Los Angeles, California; United States
- City: Twentynine Palms, California
- Channels: Digital: 23 (UHF); Virtual: 31

Programming
- Affiliations: 31.1: OnTV4U; for others, see § Subchannels

Ownership
- Owner: KVMD TV, LLC; (Ronald Ulloa); (KVMD Licensee Co., LLC)
- Sister stations: KXLA, KJLA

History
- First air date: December 1, 1997
- Former channel numbers: Analog: 31 (UHF, 1997–2003)
- Former affiliations: America One (1997–2003); Independent (2003–2008); Armenian-Russian Television Network (2008–2017); Almavision (2017–2018); LATV (2018–2021; now part-time on KXLA-DT1); NTD Television (2021–2023); Infomercials (2023–2024); Merit TV (2024–2025)

Technical information
- Licensing authority: FCC
- Facility ID: 16729
- ERP: 150 kW
- HAAT: 784 m (2,572 ft)
- Transmitter coordinates: 34°2′16.8″N 116°48′49.9″W
- Translator(s): see § Translators

Links
- Public license information: Public file; LMS
- Website: kvmdtv.com

KVMD (channel 31) is a television station in Twentynine Palms, California, United States, which primarily airs paid programming. Station owner Ronald Ulloa is also president and majority owner of Rancho Palos Verdes–licensed independent station KXLA (channel 44). KVMD's studios are located on Corinth Avenue (near Interstate 405) in West Los Angeles, and its transmitter is located atop Snow Peak in the San Bernardino Mountains, north of Banning, California; its broadcast signal covers most of the area within the Inland Empire.

KVMD's signal is relayed by two low-power translators: KSMV-LD in Los Angeles and KIMG-LD in Ventura, both of which also broadcast on digital channel 23 and virtual channel 31. The station is carried throughout the Los Angeles media market on various cable television systems. KVMD-DT is also available on DirecTV and Dish Network on channel 31, its former analog channel.

The station broadcasts digitally on 19 subchannels. Currently, programming is offered in English, Spanish, Mandarin Chinese, Vietnamese and Armenian.

== History ==
On December 1, 1997, KVMD launched on analog channel 31 with America One programming. Its original analog signal was weak and could not generally be received beyond Twentynine Palms and Yucca Valley. However, it sought and obtained carriage on many cable systems throughout Southern California, as well as satellite TV, due to its location on the outskirts of the Los Angeles DMA and Federal Communications Commission (FCC) must-carry rules.

On July 29, 2002, its digital signal went on the air on channel 23. This signal is much stronger, potentially reaching 80 times as many viewers over the air as its analog signal, and covering most of the Inland Empire. It also reaches much of Los Angeles, Orange and northern San Diego counties.

On June 1, 2003, KVMD became the first station in the country to shut off its analog channel and go digital-only, in support of the government-mandated digital transition.

On June 1, 2008, KVMD started to air ARTN Armenian programming every night. On August 31, 2017, KVMD discontinued ARTN programming and moved to cable-only; KVMD also switched to Almavision programming.

In December 2017, it was announced that the station will become the Los Angeles market's LATV affiliate on January 1, 2018, replacing KJLA, which became the market's new Azteca América affiliate.

On July 1, 2021, KVMD replaced its affiliation with LATV on its main channel with New Tang Dynasty Television (NTD). The former LATV affiliation moved to its fifth subchannel.

On October 20, 2023, NTD pulled its affiliation from KVMD’s main channel. The programming has been replaced with infomercials.

KVMD began to carry the Phil McGraw-backed Merit Street Media on its debut day, April 2, 2024, under a programming agreement with the Trinity Broadcasting Network to assure main-channel must-carry coverage of the network on pay-TV providers throughout the Los Angeles market. TBN flagship KTBN-TV (channel 40) carries Merit Street on its second subchannel, but as it also asks for must-carry coverage which disallows subchannel carriage, would have had to make separate agreements with providers to carry the network otherwise.

In June 2025, KVMD disaffiliated from Merit TV due to a payment dispute with Merit Street Media, and replaced the programming with infomercials.

== Subchannels ==
The station's signal is multiplexed:

Subchannels of KVMD
Subchannel	Res.	Short name	Programming
31.1	720p	KVMD-DT	OnTV4U (infomercials)
31.2	480i	CRTV	CRTV (infomercials) (4:3)
31.3	480i	CRTV	CRTV (infomercials) (4:3)
31.5	480i	PATV	Pan Armenian TV
31.6	480i	ShopLC	Shop LC (4:3)
31.7	480i	FINN-TV	[Blank]
31.8	480i	WCETV	WCETV / CCTV-4 (in Chinese) (4:3)
31.9	480i	CRTV	CRTV
35.1	480i	KTAV	Almavision (KTAV-LD) (4:3)
57.7	480i	AVA	AVA
57.8	480i	VIETOCC	VIETOCC (in Vietnamese) (4:3)
57.11	480i	VNBC	VNBC TV (in Vietnamese) (4:3)
57.13	480i	VCAL	VCAL TV (in Vietnamese) (4:3)
57.14	480i	VMTV	VietMedia TV (in Vietnamese) (4:3)
57.17	480i	TLM-MTM	[Blank]
57.18	480i	VISION	[Blank]
57.19	480i	IBCTV	IBC-TV (4:3) (in Spanish)
57.20	480i	TEST	(Dark) (in Vietnamese) (4:3)

Subchannel broadcast with MPEG-4 video
Simulcast of subchannels of another station

=== Translators ===
- KSMV-LD 23 Los Angeles
- KIMG-LD 23 Ventura
