= KJOR =

- Windsor, California; United States
- Broadcast area: Sonoma County, California
- Frequency: 104.1 MHz
- Branding: La Mejor 104.1

Programming
- Language: Spanish
- Format: Classic AC; Ranchera music

Ownership
- Owner: Lazer Media; (Lazer Licenses, LLC)

History
- First air date: 1997
- Former call signs: KMHX (1997–2006)
- Call sign meaning: La Mejor

Technical information
- Licensing authority: FCC
- Facility ID: 32912
- Class: A
- ERP: 900 watts
- HAAT: 93 meters (305 ft)
- Transmitter coordinates: 38°32′28″N 122°54′05″W

Links
- Public license information: Public file; LMS
- Website: lamejornetwork.com

KJOR (104.1 FM) is a radio station broadcasting a Classic Spanish Adult Contemporary and Ranchera music radio format. Licensed to Windsor, California, it serves the Santa Rosa area. The station is currently owned by Lazer Media.

== History ==
The station was originally KMHX and previously had a Hot AC Rap and Hip-hop format branded as Mix 104.1.
