= Northern California Public Media =

Public broadcaster in the San Francisco Bay Area

Northern California Public Media (formerly Rural California Broadcasting Corporation) is a non-profit public media outlet based in Rohnert Park, California, United States, that serves the San Francisco Bay Area. The organization owns PBS and independent television stations and NPR member radio stations. Its president and CEO is Darren Lashelle.

== History ==
Rural California Broadcasting Corporation began broadcasting on KRCB television on December 2, 1984, and on KRCB-FM on September 5, 1994. It became a nonprofit organization on January 17, 1981. On September 7, 2017, RCBC announced that it would acquire KCSM-TV for $12 million. Upon acquiring the station on July 31, 2018, RCBC rebranded as Northern California Public Media.

In 2019, the Kincade Fire destroyed KRCB-FM's transmitter tower. To obtain a full-powered signal in the Santa Rosa area, Northern California Public Media acquired KDHT in 2021 and moved KRCB-FM to its 104.9 MHz frequency and transmission facility. The former KRCB-FM became KRCG-FM.

== Stations ==
Northern California Public Broadcasting owns the following noncommercial stations:

- KRCB in Cotati, a PBS member television station
- KPJK in San Mateo, an independent television station
- KRCG-FM in Windsor, an NPR member radio station
- KRCB-FM in Rohnert Park, an NPR member radio station
