= KRCB (TV) =

Television station in Cotati, California

- Cotati–Santa Rosa–San Francisco–Oakland–San Jose, California; United States
- City: Cotati, California
- Channels: Digital: 5 (VHF); Virtual: 22
- Branding: KRCB

Programming
- Affiliations: 22.1: PBS; 22.2: Create; 22.3: NHK World-Japan

Ownership
- Owner: Northern California Public Media; (Rural California Broadcasting Corporation)
- Sister stations: KRCB-FM, KRCG-FM, KPJK

History
- First air date: December 2, 1984
- Former call signs: KRCB-TV (1984–1995)
- Former channel numbers: Analog: 22 (UHF, 1984–2009); Digital: 23 (UHF, 2003–2009), 22 (UHF, 2009–2020)
- Call sign meaning: "Rural California Broadcasting"

Technical information
- Licensing authority: FCC
- Facility ID: 57945
- ERP: 18.6 kW
- HAAT: 463.3 m (1,520 ft)
- Transmitter coordinates: 37°45′19″N 122°27′10″W

Links
- Public license information: Public file; LMS
- Website: norcalpublicmedia.org

KRCB (channel 22) is a PBS member television station licensed to Cotati, California, United States, serving the San Francisco Bay Area. Owned by Northern California Public Media (the Rural California Broadcasting Corporation), it is sister to public radio stations KRCG-FM (91.1) and KRCB-FM (104.9) and independent noncommercial TV station KPJK (channel 60). The stations share studios on Professional Center Drive in Rohnert Park; KRCB's transmitter is located at Sutro Tower in San Francisco.

KRCB began broadcasting on December 2, 1984. Its sign-on culminated years of effort to bring a public television station to the North Bay, which was underserved in local programming and signal coverage by San Francisco public station KQED. In 1994, KRCB expanded to FM radio broadcasting. After agreeing to sell its spectrum for $72 million in the 2016 incentive auction, it rapidly expanded, moving its transmitter to San Francisco; buying San Mateo public station KCSM-TV (now KPJK); and rebranding as Northern California Public Media. KRCB continues to serve as a secondary member of PBS and produces programming of local interest to the North Bay as well as regional programming for the Bay Area.

== History ==
=== Construction ===
In 1963, at the request of the Sonoma State College Foundation, the Federal Communications Commission (FCC) allocated educational channel 16 to Cotati. This channel was changed to 22 in a national overhaul of the ultra high frequency (UHF) table of allocations in 1966.

In the late 1970s, John Kramer, a professor at Sonoma State University, (Note: The institution was renamed Sonoma State University in 1978.) served in the White House Office of Telecommunications Policy and discovered that the Cotati educational allotment was still available. As a result, in 1981, John Kramer founded the Rural California Broadcasting Corporation (RCBC) to file for, construct, and operate the educational station. The station would broadcast from Sonoma Mountain and serve North Bay communities; the founders envisioned it primarily rebroadcasting KVIE from Sacramento with local programming and using studios at Sonoma State. Kramer envisioned the station as primarily serving rural and agricultural communities, providing North Bay coverage not produced by the San Francisco stations. Sonoma State ultimately did not provide support for the station; the two split when university president Peter Diamandopoulos declared, "If I don't control the board of directors, it cannot be on campus."

Another group also applied for the Cotati channel: the Black Television Workshop. Its proposal, filed on the last day to do so and without any public notice in local newspapers, envisioned using channel 22 to broadcast subscription television programming for the Black community in the Bay Area. It also forced Rural California Broadcasting into a comparative hearing to adjudicate who would get the channel. During prolonged FCC hearings, Kramer approached Nancy Dobbs-Dixon to be the station manager; she agreed and ultimately married Kramer after her previous marriage ended. However, facing an expensive case at the FCC, the two parties agreed to settle, with RCBC paying the Workshop in exchange for its withdrawal and the Workshop instead seeking channel 62 in Santa Rosa. (Note: For more information on the Black Television Workshop, see KEEF-TV.) The FCC granted a construction permit in September 1982.

The station slated a mid-1983 launch and began to receive grant funds from the National Telecommunications and Information Administration to finance construction. By the end of 1982, the station needed to raise funds and find permanent studio space to support its local programming plans. These included programs in Spanish; the station manager of bilingual radio station KBBF sat on Rural California Broadcasting's first board of directors. In February 1984, the city of Rohnert Park approved the station to build studios and offices at a city-owned site on LaBath Avenue, to which the station would move buildings once used by Synanon in Marin County and donated by the San Francisco Foundation. By that time, the station appeared to be headed for a launch in mid-1984. Capital fundraising efforts in the community were stepped up, as the station needed to raise matching funds from the community for the grants it had received. Station staff were still operating from temporary offices by late 1984.

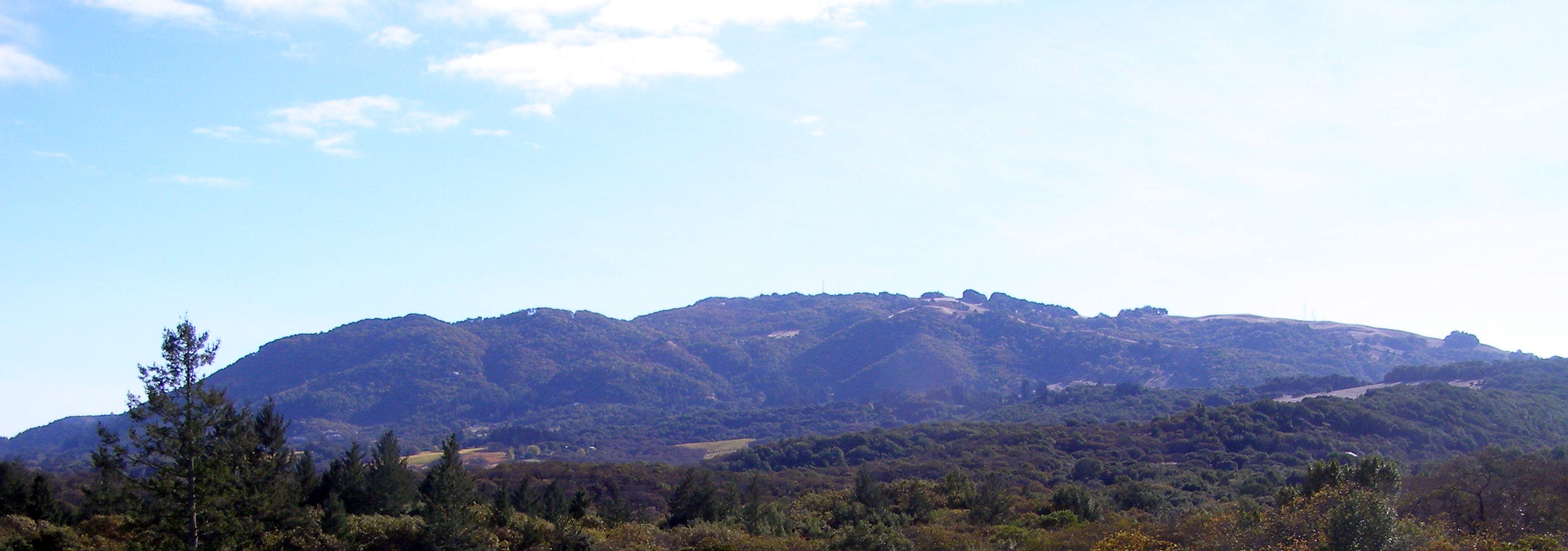
KRCB originally broadcast from Sonoma Mountain, providing public television service to households unable to receive San Francisco's KQED.

KRCB began broadcasting on December 2, 1984, providing service to more than a million people, including many in the North Bay that could not receive KQED from San Francisco. One local child wrote a thank you to the new station, containing 35 cents and a handwritten card claiming, "Now I can get Sesame Street." The length of time it took to put the station on the air left its finances in a precarious condition: it had to nearly immediately refinance its studios to raise money that would count as matching funds for its original 1982 grant. Where it had once proposed 13 hours a week of local programs, it was airing short interstitial items instead. However, its local programming steadily grew over the next several years. This was a service not matched by KQED, though the San Francisco public station continued to have a far wider base of support and a far larger operating budget. In Sonoma, Marin, and Napa counties alone, KQED had some 12,000 members in 1988; KRCB had 2,800 members in total. The station also struggled with poor placement on local cable systems; some subscribers needed converter boxes to tune in KRCB, making it less available.

=== Growth ===
In 1991, KRCB obtained a construction permit to launch a new radio station at 91.1 MHz after a religious group that had held such a permit failed to put its station on the air. It would provide the first English-language public radio station for the area. KRCB-FM began broadcasting on September 1, 1994. By 1997, KRCB was a member of the PBS Program Differentiation Plan, only airing about 25 percent of the network schedule with most shows on an eight-day delay from when they aired on KQED.

KRCB debuted on the Comcast cable system in San Francisco in 2003, the first time it had been broadcast there. In 2004, it acquired the land on which it was located from the city of Rohnert Park after it faced a budget crunch; the city sold the site of Rohnert Park Stadium for development and the adjacent KRCB site to the station.

KRCB began digital telecasting in late 2003, participating in a pilot program to use bandwidth to provide internet service to households in rural Sonoma County. It shut down its analog signal, over UHF channel 22, on June 12, 2009, as part of the federally mandated transition from analog to digital television. The station's digital signal relocated from its pre-transition UHF channel 23 to channel 22.

=== Repack and transmitter move to San Francisco ===
KRCB agreed to move frequencies to the very high frequency (VHF) band in the 2016 United States wireless spectrum auction for $72 million on February 10, 2017. The proceeds were used to start an endowment and upgrade the Rohnert Park studios. On September 7, 2017, KRCB announced that it would acquire KCSM-TV in San Mateo from the San Mateo County Community College District for $12 million, using some of the money earned in the auction; the acquisition allowed KRCB to expand its reach into the Bay Area, as KCSM-TV's transmitter is located at the Sutro Tower in San Francisco. KRCB relaunched KCSM-TV as KPJK on July 31, 2018; the station was named in honor of John Kramer, who had died in 2014. Concurrently with the launch of KPJK, the stations came under the Northern California Public Media banner. After the auction, Northern California Public Media's annual budget swelled from $2.8 million to $4.1 million.

One result of the change to VHF channel 5 was that, to remain on Sonoma Mountain, the tower would have to be replaced; it was at capacity with existing uses. Sonoma County told RCBC that it would have to pay the full cost of a new tower and was considering evicting it from the site. As a result, in December 2018, the station applied to the FCC to relocate its transmitter to Sutro Tower, whose operator had approached the station and suggested it relocate to co-site KRCB with KPJK. The frequency change took place on April 29, 2020.

In 2019, Nancy Dobbs retired after having run KRCB for its entire 35-year history. She was replaced by Northern California Public Media content manager Darren LaShelle. In 2025, the organization moved to new studios in Rohnert Park, which feature wood walls made from salvaged high school bleachers. That year, the organization lost 10% of its revenue from the defunding of the Corporation for Public Broadcasting.

== Local programming ==
KRCB airs local programs about the North Bay as well as environmental issues in the Bay Area with series such as Bay Area Bountiful. The 10-episode documentary series Climate California, which KRCB aired between 2024 and 2025, is set to debut nationally on PBS in 2026.

== Subchannels ==
KRCB is broadcast from Sutro Tower. The station's signal is multiplexed:

Subchannels of KRCB
Subchannel	Res.	Short name	Programming
22.1	1080i	KRCB-DT	PBS
22.2	480i	KRCB-C	Create
22.3	720p	NHKWORL	NHK World-Japan
