= KRCG-FM =

Public radio station in Windsor, California, United States

Simulcast of KRCB-FM 104.9
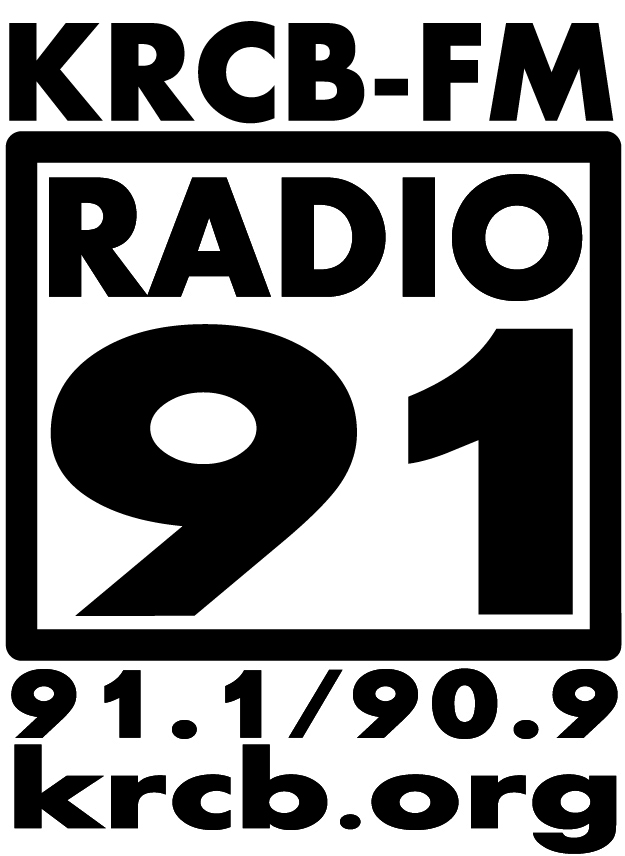
- Santa Rosa, California; United States
- Broadcast area: Sonoma County
- Frequency: 91.1 MHz

Programming
- Format: Public radio
- Affiliations: NPR, PRX

Ownership
- Owner: Northern California Public Media; (Rural California Broadcasting Corporation)
- Sister stations: KRCB-FM; KRCB; KPJK

History
- First air date: September 1993
- Former call signs: KZQC (1991–1993); KRCB-FM (1993–2021)
- Call sign meaning: Variation on KRCB

Technical information
- Licensing authority: FCC
- Facility ID: 57946
- Class: A
- ERP: 120 watts
- HAAT: 223 meters (732 ft)
- Transmitter coordinates: 38°44′24.6″N 122°50′49.9″W

Links
- Public license information: Public file; LMS
- Webcast: Listen live
- Website: norcalpublicmedia.org/radio/radio

KRCG-FM is a non-commercial public broadcasting radio station licensed to Santa Rosa, California, serving Santa Rosa, Healdsburg, Cloverdale, Geyserville, Windsor, Sebastopol, Forestville, Calistoga and surrounding areas in California. KRCG-FM is owned and operated by Northern California Public Media.

This station transmitted with callsign KRCB-FM until Northern California Public Media acquired the 104.9 FM frequency licensed to Rohnert Park, then commercial station KDHT, in 2021; the transaction was spurred when the Kincade Fire destroyed the tower used for the 91.1 facility. The move to 104.9 gave Northern California Public Media a full-powered signal in the Santa Rosa area, and the KRCB-FM callsign was given to the bigger signal. Consequently, the KRCG-FM callsign was allocated to 91.1.

== Translator ==
In addition to the main station, KRCG-FM is relayed by an FM translator to widen its broadcast area.

Call sign	Frequency	City of license	FID	ERP (W)	HAAT	Class	FCC info
K215CQ	90.9 FM	Santa Rosa, California	89938	16 watts	−71 m (−233 ft)	D	LMS
