= KRCB-FM =

Coordinates: 38.392°N 122.679°W

Rohnert Park, California; United States
- Broadcast area: Santa Rosa; Sonoma County
- Frequency: 104.9 MHz
- Branding: KRCB 104.9

Programming
- Format: Public radio
- Affiliations: National Public Radio, PRX

Ownership
- Owner: Northern California Public Media; (Rural California Broadcasting Corporation)
- Sister stations: KRCB; KPJK

History
- First air date: March 4, 1986
- Former call signs: KRPQ (1985–2006); KMHX (2006–2017); KDHT (2017–2021)
- Call sign meaning: "Rural California Broadcasting"

Technical information
- Licensing authority: FCC
- Facility ID: 55967
- Class: B1
- ERP: 2,300 watts
- HAAT: 325 meters (1,066 ft)
- Repeater: 91.1 KRCG-FM (Santa Rosa)

Links
- Public license information: Public file; LMS
- Webcast: Listen live
- Website: norcalpublicmedia.org/radio/radio

KRCB-FM (104.9 FM) is a radio station in Rohnert Park, California, and broadcasting to the Santa Rosa-Sonoma County area. The station became the primary radio frequency for Northern California Public Media's public radio service in 2021 after operating as a commercial station since 1986. As a public radio station, KRCB-FM features NPR and local news and talk programs, along with music programs featuring adult album alternative, jazz, blues, and world music.

KRCB-FM has an effective radiated power (ERP) of 2,300 watts. The transmitter is off Calistoga Road in Santa Rosa. Most programming is also heard in Santa Rosa on 91.1 KRCG-FM, the original home of KRCB's radio service.

== History ==
=== Early years ===
The station signed on as KRPQ "Q105" on March 4, 1986, with a country music format. It was established by a four-person partnership of Ron Castro, Steve Watts, Anetha Baxter and Lynn Hendel.

In 1991, former Q105 saleswoman Karen Heick was awarded $387,500 by a Sonoma County Superior Court jury which found that she had been harassed on the job. After a cross-appeal, the station ended up paying out $918,000 to Heick between 1991 and 1994. Two other cases were brought against the station on similar charges but never came to trial.

KRPQ was sold in 1994 to a group headed by one of the original partners, Ron Castro: Results Radio of Sonoma, for more than $2 million.

=== Adult contemporary ===
In 2006, Maverick Media purchased KRPQ and the intellectual property of a second Results Radio station, KMHX at 104.1 FM; with that frequency being sold separately and Maverick already owning country competitor KFGY "Froggy 92.9", KMHX's hot adult contemporary format was moved to the 104.9 frequency. By 2011, the station had moved to adult contemporary from adult top 40 according to Mediabase; in August 2012, KMHX returned to hot adult contemporary. Lawrence Amaturo acquired the Maverick Santa Rosa cluster for $4.5 million, forming the Sonoma Media Group.

=== K-Hits 104.9 ===
On September 21, 2017, at 5 p.m., KMHX changed formats from hot adult contemporary to 1980s-based classic hits, branded as "K-Hits 104.9".

=== From classic hits to public radio ===
In January 2021, Amaturo Sonoma Media Group reached a deal to sell the KDHT facility to Northern California Public Media (NCPM), which owned KRCB-FM 91.1, the region's public radio station. After the Kincade Fire destroyed the KRCB-FM tower located midway between Cloverdale and Healdsburg, Amaturo sold the 104.9 facility to NCPM — despite not pursuing a buyer — because of "a desire to strengthen public radio in Sonoma County" responding to a proposal made by NCPM.

Beginning on May 4, 2021, K-Hits began promoting a move from 104.9 to translator K300AO (107.9 MHz) and 101.7 KHTH-HD2, replacing the simulcast of KFGY. On May 14, KRCB-FM began broadcasting on 104.9 FM, simulcasting the pre-existing 91.1 transmitter (which changed callsigns from KRCB-FM to KRCG-FM). On May 31, 2021, KDHT changed its call sign to KRCB-FM.
