= KPJK =

Television station in San Mateo, California

- San Mateo–San Francisco–Oakland–; San Jose, California; United States
- City: San Mateo, California
- Channels: Digital: 27 (UHF); Virtual: 60
- Branding: KPJK

Programming
- Affiliations: 60.1: Non-commercial independent; for others, see § Subchannels

Ownership
- Owner: Northern California Public Media; (Rural California Broadcasting Corporation)
- Sister stations: KRCB; KRCB-FM; KRCG-FM

History
- First air date: October 12, 1964
- Former call signs: KCSM-TV (1964–2018)
- Former channel numbers: Analog: 14 (UHF, 1964–1979), 60 (UHF, 1979–2004); Digital: 43 (UHF, 2004–2020)
- Former affiliations: NET (1964–1970); PBS (1970–2009)
- Call sign meaning: Professor John Kramer (founder of sister station KRCB)

Technical information
- Licensing authority: FCC
- Facility ID: 58912
- ERP: 465 kW
- HAAT: 518 m (1,699 ft)
- Transmitter coordinates: 37°45′19″N 122°27′10″W

Links
- Public license information: Public file; LMS
- Website: norcalpublicmedia.org

KPJK (channel 60) is a non-commercial Independent television station licensed to San Mateo, California, United States, serving the San Francisco Bay Area. Owned by Northern California Public Media (not to be confused with Northern California Public Broadcasting), it is sister to PBS member station KRCB (channel 22) and NPR member stations KRCB-FM (104.9) and KRCG-FM (91.1). KPJK's studios are located on West Hillsdale Boulevard on the campus of the College of San Mateo in southwestern San Mateo, and its transmitter is located atop Sutro Tower in San Francisco.

KPJK operates 24 hours a day with programming coming from American Public Television and other independent producers. Previously, the station was owned by the College of San Mateo, and operated as KCSM-TV.

== History ==
=== Early history (1964–1979) ===
KCSM radio and KCSM-TV were originally established by the College of San Mateo (CSM) as college radio and student television station training facilities for radio and television broadcasters.

KCSM-TV first signed on at channel 14 on October 12, 1964; the station was founded by Dr. Jacob H. Wiens, chair of the electronics department at the College of San Mateo. KCSM was the second TV station in the U.S. to be owned by a community college. It was originally a member station of National Educational Television until 1970, when that service was succeeded by the Public Broadcasting Service (PBS).

Early local programming on KCSM-TV included College of San Mateo basketball games.

From June 9 to September 11, 1967, KCSM-TV and -FM went silent for equipment upgrades and preparation of fall semester programming; the stations temporarily returned to air for the College of San Mateo's graduation ceremony on June 18.

Beginning in 1969, KCSM-TV added telecourses to its programming schedule, starting with classes in psychology and health education.

Due to limited funding, KCSM continued to broadcast in black and white as late as the mid-1970s, long after most American TV stations converted to color.

=== Move from channel 14 to 60 (1979–2004) ===
In 1979, KCSM reached a deal with Spanish International Network station KDTV to begin operating from its full-power color facilities and moved to channel 60 on March 5, 1979; KDTV in turn moved to channel 14.

A 1981 San Jose Mercury News column found KCSM to have "the largest commitment to business news by a Bay Area station," including Nightly Business Report.

With state and federal funding limited due to California Proposition 13 and the U.S. Congress scaling back public broadcasting funds, KCSM was among several California public TV stations forced to cut costs in 1982. Among KCSM's changes were the cancellation of Computer Chronicles and adding "tasteful" commercials between shows.

=== End of analog signal; FCC fine (2004–2009) ===
KCSM-TV logo circa 2000 to 2010.

KCSM ceased regular programming on its channel 60 analog signal on May 15, 2004, due to a costly rent increase for full-power transmitter space. The station ran a billboard advising viewers that it would be available only through a digital channel before the channel 60 analog signal signed off on May 24. As TV Technology recounted in 2005, KCSM faced difficulty in handling viewer complaints:

The phones at KCSM rang constantly. Everyone at the station had to be trained how to deal with the calls. People were sent to consumer electronics stores for digital receivers. The only problem was, there weren't any to be had.

In March 2006, in response to a viewer's complaint, the FCC levied a $15,000 fine against KCSM for content in the documentary, The Blues: Godfathers and Sons, which the station had aired in March 2004. The series documented the birth and worldwide influence of the blues as a musical genre. One installment contained interviews with artists and others who expressed their feelings of oppression by the music industry, including the use of variations of the words "fuck" and "shit". The FCC commented in its ruling: "The gratuitous and repeated use of this language...aired at a time when children were expected to be in the audience is shocking." KCSM filed an appeal with the FCC in May 2006.

In 2007, the San Francisco Chronicle reported that following the FCC fine, KCSM began devoting "at least half a day a week" editing programs for possibly indecent material. For instance, in a telecourse about art history, KCSM blurred nudity from Venus de Milo.

=== Budget problems and sale (2009–2018) ===
With a state budget crisis impacting the SMCCD, KCSM dropped its membership with PBS in July 2009 and became an independent public television station. Dropping PBS cut KCSM's annual budget by about $400,000. KCSM-TV retained an affiliation with MHz Worldview for programming feeds on its second digital subchannel.

On December 7, 2011, the San Mateo County Community College District announced plans to sell KCSM-TV, due to budgetary constraints as well as an operating deficit of $1 million. KCSM radio would continue operations as usual. All bids in response to the initial request for proposals to purchase the television station were rejected on October 24, 2012, and the district subsequently issued a second request for proposals. On May 15, 2013, the district approved an agreement with LocusPoint Networks, who would provide a $900,000 annual subsidy for up to four years and then split the proceeds of an auction of its spectrum allocation. The KCSM-TV spectrum was expected to be sold for upwards of $10 million to wireless communication companies.

On July 15, 2013, KCSM dropped most of the programming syndicated by public television distributors (with the exception of those airing as part of a discrete afternoon block), moving the MHz Worldview feed to its main channel. It brought back aforementioned programming on July 15, 2014.

As of April 12, 2017, LocusPoint Networks, hired by the district to sell the station due to its $1 million annual losses, claimed fiscal mismanagement and incompetence by school officials and administrators to fulfill their basic obligations to facilitate the sale properly. In turn, the District counter-sued LocusPoint, a multi-station operator, and its partner, PricewaterhouseCoopers for failure to enter KCSM-TV into the 2016 United States wireless spectrum auction.

On September 7, 2017, Sonoma County public television station KRCB (channel 22) announced that it would acquire KCSM-TV for $12 million. The Rural California Broadcasting Corporation applied to change the station's call letters to KPJK; the call letters were chosen to honor John Kramer, a professor at Sonoma State University who founded KRCB with his wife, Nancy Dobbs, in 1984. On October 24, LocusPoint Networks filed a lawsuit to block the sale to KRCB, claiming that the sale was not valid and violated its contract with KCSM-TV.

=== As KPJK (2018–present) ===
On July 31, 2018, KRCB took control of KCSM-TV and the call letters were changed to KPJK. Though KRCB sought to have KPJK rejoin PBS, its membership request was denied due to overlap with San Francisco's main PBS station, KQED (channel 9), as PBS has sought to eliminate duplication of programming within the same market. The station continued to simulcast KCSM radio on subchannel 60.5, under the branding "KCSM Jazz TV", even though the radio station was retained by the San Mateo County Community College District.

== Technical information ==
=== Subchannels ===
The station's digital signal is multiplexed:

Subchannels of KPJK
Subchannel	Res.	Short name	Programming
60.1	720p	KPJKHD	Main KPJK programming
60.2	480i	PJKF24	France 24
60.3	720p	PJKNHK	NHK World
60.4	480i	PJKDW	Deutsche Welle
60.5	480i	PJKFNX	First Nations Experience
60.6	480i	PJK1049	Jazz TV
