= KOFY-TV =

Television station in San Francisco

- San Francisco–Oakland–; San Jose, California; United States
- City: San Francisco, California
- Channels: Digital: 21 (UHF), shared with KCNZ-CD and KMPX-LD; Virtual: 20

Programming
- Affiliations: 20.1: Estrella TV; for others, see § Subchannels

Ownership
- Owner: CNZ Communications, LLC; (Stryker Media 2, LLC)
- Sister stations: KCNZ-CD, KMPX-LD

History
- First air date: April 1, 1968
- Former call signs: KEMO-TV (1968–1980); KTZO (1980–1986); KBWB (1998–2008)
- Former channel numbers: Analog: 20 (UHF, 1968–2009); Digital: 19 (UHF, until 2018), 28 (UHF, 2018–2020)
- Former affiliations: Independent (1968–1995; 2006–2022); The WB (1995–2006); Grit (2022–2024 on 20.1, 2024–2026 on 20.2); Merit TV (2024–2026)
- Call sign meaning: Pronounced "coffee", taken from KOFY radio

Technical information
- Licensing authority: FCC
- Facility ID: 51189
- ERP: 15 kW
- HAAT: 377.2 m (1,238 ft)
- Transmitter coordinates: 37°41′14.4″N 122°26′5.3″W

Links
- Public license information: Public file; LMS

KOFY-TV (channel 20) is a television station licensed to San Francisco, California, United States, serving the San Francisco Bay Area as an affiliate of Estrella TV. It is owned by CNZ Communications, LLC, alongside Class A station KCNZ-CD (channel 28) and low-power station KMPX-LD (channel 18). The three stations share transmitter facilities atop San Bruno Mountain. KOFY-TV's studios were previously located on Marin Street in the Bayview–Hunters Point neighborhood of San Francisco until 2018; the station has since maintained space at KGO-TV's studios in the city's North Waterfront district.

== History ==
=== Unbuilt ===
The construction permit for channel 20 was first awarded to Lawrence A. Harvey as KBAY-TV on March 11, 1953. Harvey owned industrial interests in Torrance and had also attempted to pursue construction permits in Los Angeles and Salem, Oregon. Despite an apparent attempt to sign on September 15, KBAY-TV did not make the air. Leonard and Lily Averett, doing business as Bay Television, acquired the unbuilt construction permit in January 1955 for no consideration; Leonard was a doctor who lived in Beverly Hills. A third southern Californian, Sherrill Corwin, acquired channel 20 in 1957 for the $1,750 the Averetts had spent on the venture, but KBAY-TV (which held callsign KEZE-TV from 1961 to 1963) was still not built.

In late 1964, Corwin filed to sell KBAY-TV to Overmyer Communications Company, a broadcaster owned by Daniel H. Overmyer, who would later start the short-lived Overmyer Network (later called the United Network). The sale application was approved, after a hearing, in October 1965. The following year was a busy one: the station filed to move its facility from KGO's tower on Avanzada Street to Mount Sutro, while the call letters were changed to KEMO-TV, for Daniel's son, Edward Manning Overmyer.

=== KEMO-TV ===
As KEMO-TV, channel 20 would sign on April 1, 1968. It was jointly owned by the U.S. Communications Corporation station group of Philadelphia, holding an 80% interest and the remaining 20% by Corwin. Overmyer had previously sold 80% interest in the construction permits for WBMO-TV in Atlanta, WSCO-TV in Cincinnati, KEMO-TV in San Francisco, WECO-TV in Pittsburgh and KJDO-TV in Houston to AVC Corporation (U.S. Communications Corporation) on March 28, 1967, with Federal Communications Commission (FCC) approval of their sale coming December 8, 1967. None of the stations were on the air at the time of the FCC approval of the sale. Beside KEMO-TV, U.S. Communications also operated WPHL-TV in Philadelphia, WATL in Atlanta, WXIX-TV in Cincinnati and WPGH-TV in Pittsburgh.

KEMO-TV showed conventional independent fare, along with The Adults Only Movie, a series of art films, not featuring sex or nudity—it was named "Adults Only" merely due to the films' lack of appeal to children. KEMO also offered Japanese live-action programs and cartoons dubbed into English including Speed Racer, Ultraman, 8 Man, Prince Planet, Johnny Cypher in Dimension Zero and The King Kong Show. With a mixture of locally produced and syndicated programming, KEMO-TV remained on the air for three years to the day, powering down its transmitter at midnight on March 31, 1971, to avoid paying the following month's PG&E electricity bill.

The former owner of KMPX-FM in San Francisco, Leon Crosby bought KEMO-TV later that year and it returned to the air on February 4, 1972. With an eclectic type of programming, KEMO featured shows such as Solesvida and Amapola Presents Show co-hosted by Amapola and Ness Aquino, to name a few. In 1973, Crosby also purchased WPGH-TV, the dark U.S. Communications station in Pittsburgh, bringing it back on the air January 14, 1974.

From 1972 to 1980, KEMO aired stock market programming in the mornings (anchored by future CNN and Fox Business anchor Stuart Varney), religious programming in midday, local Spanish programming in the weekday afternoons and evenings, local Italian and imported Japanese programming on Sunday nights, and B-grade movies overnight, with Oakland carpet store owner Leon Heskett hosting the films. Leon Crosby's KEMO signed off on September 30, 1980.

==== KTZO ====
KOFY's 1985 logo when known as KTZO

The station was then sold to FM radio pioneer James Gabbert (who previously owned popular music station KIOI (101.3 FM)), who returned it to the air on October 6, 1980, as KTZO (which stood for "Television 20", the Z being construed as a numeral 2), with a dramatically upgraded general entertainment format, featuring off-network drama shows, sitcoms, old movies, rejected CBS and NBC shows preempted by KPIX-TV (channel 5; notably including CBS' powerhouse daytime game show The Price Is Right) and KRON-TV (channel 4), music videos, and religious shows. But while its independent competitors at that time, KTVU (channel 2, now a Fox owned-and-operated station), KICU-TV (channel 36) and KBHK (channel 44, now KPYX) landed stronger syndicated programs, a majority of KTZO's programming lineup at most consisted of low-budget programs, which continued into its early years as KOFY. Most memorable were the station identification bumpers featuring pets — usually dogs, but occasionally cats and even parrots — of Bay Area viewers that would look on cue at a television screen showing the station's logo. In fact, these proved to be immensely popular, so much so that KTZO/KOFY eventually began working with the Society for the Prevention of Cruelty to Animals by displaying pets that could be adopted, along with a phone number to call with the pet's name on screen. These IDs were retired in 1998, having aired alongside "official" WB-issued KOFY IDs for the first three years of the network's existence.

Other popular programming during the early and mid-1980s included the TV-20 Dance Party — originally a "Top 40" music format featuring local high schools, hosted by Bay Area DJ Tony Kilbert; later a 1950s "retro" style show hosted by Gabbert — and a Sunday late-night movie program. The Sunday program included studio segments at the beginning and commercial breaks of the movie, hosted by Gabbert and set in the fictional "Sleazy Arms Hotel" bar. Viewers were invited to join Gabbert on the set and for a time, enjoy a sponsor's product, a malt liquor.

Also in the early 1980s, KTZO became one of the many stations in the U.S. to broadcast Star Fleet, a.k.a. X-Bomber, a sci-fi marionette television series that originally debuted in Japan in 1980.

==== KOFY ====
On March 1, 1986, the station changed its call letters to KOFY-TV (pronounced "coffee"). The change occurred following Gabbert's purchase of radio station KOFY (1050 AM, now KTCT), which operated as a Spanish language station until Gabbert changed the format to 1950s–60s oldies rock during the 1980s and 1990s, later reverting to the Spanish language format. Gabbert sold KOFY radio in 1997 to Susquehanna Radio Corporation which changed the format from Spanish music to a sports talk format complementing its existing sports station, KNBR. At one point, Gabbert made Bay Area broadcasting history by televising a 3D movie that required special glasses, Gorilla at Large. KOFY-TV continued to run a general entertainment format, and added more cartoons in the late 1980s. Beginning in September 1987, the station filled the 7 to 11 p.m. timeslot with drama series such as Perry Mason, Cannon, Lou Grant and Combat!

From the mid-1980s to the early 1990s, KOFY also featured an in-studio, live kids cartoon show called Cartoon Classics. Hosted by Maestro Dick Bright, the show offered such cartoons as Mighty Mouse, Bugs Bunny, Tom and Jerry and Popeye. The show frequently featured local magician Magic Mike (played by Michael Stroud) performing for the studio children. However, the live-action studio segment was later scrapped, and the program just showed the cartoons straight. Afternoon cartoon shows such as these eventually became a thing of the past, as cable television was able to feature round-the-clock cartoons aimed at younger viewers with the launch of Cartoon Network in October 1992.

early/mid 90s KOFY logo

KOFY added more sitcoms in the early 1990s. As noted above, KOFY also broadcast network daytime game shows and Saturday morning cartoons not carried by KRON and KPIX such as NBC game shows Blockbusters, Classic Concentration and the daytime version of Win, Lose or Draw; the NBC cartoon series Alvin and the Chipmunks; the CBS game show The Price Is Right; the CBS cartoon series The Get Along Gang and Saturday Supercade; and for a few weeks during the Oliver North Iran-Contra hearings, Wordplay. The CBS game show Tattletales was picked up for the KEMO schedule during the mid-1970s among its foreign language-heavy programming when KPIX did not carry its CBS feed.

On Christmas Eve, KOFY would preempt normal programming during the entire evening and broadcast its own version of the Yule Log, a concept borrowed from WPIX in New York City (which incidentally, would also later affiliate with The WB). From the late 1980s through the mid-1990s, the station ran an "oldies dance party" show hosted by James Gabbert, and emceed by Sean King.

In mid-January 1994, the station began airing the Action Pack programming block with TekWar, which caused ratings to jump 350% over its November numbers.

=== As a WB affiliate ===
The station became the Bay Area's WB affiliate, when the network launched on January 11, 1995. KOFY eventually began to upgrade its programming inventory from low-budget programming to more higher-profile syndicated programs to compete with other stations in the market and channel 20's own growth as a WB affiliate.

KBWB's last logo as a WB affiliate, used from 2002 to 2006.

In 1996, KOFY-TV employees attempted to organize as a collective bargaining unit under the labor union for broadcast employees, NABET. Gabbert interfered with the organizing effort, resulting in a case before the National Labor Relations Board. The NLRB ultimately ruled against the station. In 1998, Gabbert sold KOFY for $170 million to minority-owned Granite Broadcasting, who changed the call sign to KBWB on September 14, 1998, to reflect its network affiliation. In 1999, KBWB's operations were merged with those of then-sister station KNTV (channel 11) in San Jose, who contributed a 10 p.m. newscast, plus simulcasts of its morning newscast, and, in return, received a temporary WB affiliation for 18 months after KNTV voluntarily dropped its ABC affiliation at the behest of network-owned KGO-TV (channel 7; KGO served most of the Bay Area, while KNTV served as the ABC affiliate for the South Bay). This arrangement ended in April 2002 after KNTV, by then the NBC affiliate for the San Francisco market, was sold to that network.

==== Aborted sale of KBWB ====
In September 2005, Granite announced the sale of KBWB and sister station WDWB (now WMYD) in Detroit to AM Media Holdings, Inc. (a unit of Acon Investments and several key Granite shareholders) for a price rated, on KBWB's end, to around $83 million. The low price, compared to the more than double amount Granite had purchased the station for, came out of Granite wanting to cut down its debt load while wanting to keep control of the stations. On February 15, 2006, Granite announced the restructuring of the sale considering the changing conditions of the station and that AM Media Holdings may not own channel 20.

In May 2006, Granite announced that it had sold KBWB, along with WMYD, to DS Audible, a new group affiliated with Canyon Capital Advisors, D. B. Zwirn & Co., Fortress Investment Group and Ramius Capital Group, among others, for $150 million cash (DS Audible San Francisco, LLC, one of the two groups created by the investment groups, would have acquired KBWB for $65.75 million). The previous agreement to sell the two stations to AM Media was withdrawn. On July 18, 2006, this sale also fell apart; Granite then announced it would try to find another company willing to buy KBWB. Granite filed for Chapter 11 bankruptcy reorganization on December 11, 2006, after missing an interest payment on its debt of more than $400 million.

=== Return to independence ===
KOFY's 2006 "Your TV20" logo (as KBWB)

On January 24, 2006, the Warner Bros. unit of Time Warner and CBS Corporation announced that the two companies would shut down The WB and UPN and combine the networks' respective programming to create a new "fifth" network called The CW. On the day of the announcement, the network signed a ten-year affiliation deal with 11 of CBS Corporation's 15 UPN stations, including KBHK-TV (which subsequently changed its calls to KBCW). Network representatives were on record as preferring the "strongest" WB and UPN affiliates in terms of viewership, and KBHK had been well ahead of KBWB in the ratings for virtually all of UPN's run. Another new network that would launch the same month as The CW, MyNetworkTV (which debuted on September 5), ended up affiliating with former NBC affiliate turned independent KRON-TV.

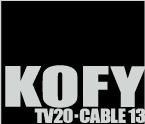
2008 logo

Soon after the CW announcement, the station rebranded to "TV20" (following the lead of Detroit's future MyNetworkTV affiliate and sister station WMYD, formerly WDWB, which also branded as "TV20"). KBWB reverted to being an independent station on September 18, 2006 (one of three in the San Francisco market, alongside KICU and KFTY channel 50, now KEMO-TV), under the new branding as Your TV20 (a parallel of sorts to "My TV20", the branding of sister station WMYD, which affiliated with MyNetworkTV). In March 2008, channel 20 revived the station IDs featuring dogs that were previously used under James Gabbert's ownership of the station.

KBWB then became an alternate ABC affiliate, carrying programs from that network during instances where KGO-TV preempts regularly scheduled network programming for local breaking news coverage. On October 8, 2008, at 10 p.m., KBWB reverted to its previous KOFY-TV call letters, commemorating the change with a 10-minute documentary about former owner James Gabbert and the station's history.

In 2009, KOFY started airing the old Dance Party reruns and due to their popularity brought back an 1980s themed Dance Party in 2011, which lasted through most of the decade.

2015 logo

In the FCC's incentive auction, KOFY-TV sold its spectrum for $88,357,227 and indicated that it would enter into a post-auction channel sharing agreement. On October 30, 2017, the station entered into a channel sharing agreement with KCNZ-CD (channel 28); concurrently, Granite Broadcasting agreed to sell the KOFY-TV license to Stryker Media 2, a sister company to KCNZ-CD owner Poquito Mas Communications, for $6 million; Stryker Media 2 is a subsidiary of CNZ Communications. The sale was completed on October 15, 2018.

=== End of local operations ===
On April 15, 2022, KOFY-TV's studio was shut down and it began to pass-through Grit for its entire broadcast week on its main channel. On April 2, 2024, KOFY-TV's main channel switched to Merit Street and Grit moved to its second subchannel. In 2026, with Merit having financial problems, KOFY went back to Spanish programming with the Estrella TV network on its main channel.

== Past programming ==
=== Syndicated programming ===
Prior to the switch to Grit, KOFY-TV offered a schedule of syndicated first-run and off-network programming such as The Steve Wilkos Show, Jerry Springer, Maury, Right This Minute, Law & Crime Daily, America's Court with Judge Ross, Last Man Standing, and Black-ish.

In addition, the station occasionally aired ABC network programming in the event of programming conflicts on KGO.

=== Sports ===
In the 1990s, KOFY-TV aired a select number of University of San Francisco Dons college basketball games. On April 3, 2013, KOFY-TV aired its first baseball telecast, a prime time game between the Oakland Athletics and the Seattle Mariners, that was produced by Comcast SportsNet California.

In 2021, KOFY-TV aired Oakland Roots SC soccer games.

=== Former local programming ===
==== The Daily Mixx ====
From 2002 to 2006, KBWB ran an entertainment news segment called The Daily Mixx, which aired at 5:56 and 10 p.m. daily. The Mixx, as it was sometimes referred to, showed clips of celebrity interviews as well as movie previews and giveaways such as tickets to the Santa Cruz Beach Boardwalk and Winchester Mystery House. It was hosted by Chris Labrum and Angela Murrow (sometimes known as Angela Bakke) during the segment's first two years and by Lesley Nagy and Shane Tallant in subsequent years. An extended version, called The Mixx EP, aired on the fourth Wednesday or Thursday of each month. In January 2006, Tallant left KBWB leaving Nagy as the station's lone correspondent.

==== Creepy KOFY Movie Time ====
On January 1, 2009, KOFY premiered a late night horror movie showcase titled Creepy KOFY Movie Time (retitled as Creepy Koffee Movie Time for its later VOD release on Amazon), that first aired at midnight when it premiered that early New Year's Day morning. Afterward, the program moved to its permanent timeslot on late Saturday nights/very early Sunday mornings at 11 p.m. on January 3, 2009.

The program was hosted by local radio personality No Name, and Balrok, a demon, who claimed to broadcast from caves under the KOFY studios. The hosts had a snarky frat-boy style and had many off-color guests, including local comedians, burlesque performers, and adult film actresses. The broadcast featured an in-house band, the surf/punk band The Deadlies, and the hosts were often flanked during the broadcast by a variety of comely bikini clad models/actresses/fans, one being Shotzi Blackheart. Beginning with its third season in 2010, the program added two regular go-go dancers known as the Cave Girls whom often performed with the Deadlies. On July 24, 2010, Creepy KOFY Movie Time was moved to 11 p.m. The show aired its last new regular episode on October 31, 2014. Its timeslot on KOFY was ultimately taken over by a new version of Creature Features. A one-off revival of Creepy KOFY Movie Time, featuring the 1976 film Último deseo, aired on April 9, 2022, just six days before the KOFY studio was shut down.

=== Former newscasts ===
==== NewsCenter 4 on KOFY ====
The station aired a local newscast, by the early 1990s, which was eventually canceled after a few years. Prior to this, in 1989, the station rebroadcast KRON-TV (channel 4)'s newscasts, branded as NewsCenter 4 on KOFY. The KRON-produced 10 p.m. newscast debuted in March 1991 with Pete Wilson and Pam Moore as co-anchors, but ended a year later when KRON-TV began the "early prime" experiment (in which it, and later, KPIX-TV, moved prime time programming one hour earlier, matching the prime time scheduling of network shows in the Central and Mountain Time Zones) and "moved" the 10 p.m. newscast over to channel 4 (in actuality, moving the station's existing 11 p.m. newscast to the 10 p.m. slot).

==== WB affiliation ====
Under Granite ownership, the station reintroduced a 10 p.m. newscast—this time, produced by KNTV—titled WB20 News at 10 on September 14, 1998 (the same day as KOFY's callsign change to KBWB); the program was renamed The WB Primetime News at 10 on July 3, 2000, when KNTV also began producing a morning newscast for the station. However, the KNTV-produced prime time news effort failed to pose a significant threat to KTVU's long-dominant 10 p.m. newscast (an issue which caused KRON and KPIX-TV to move their newscasts back to 11 p.m. by the late 1990s), and both newscasts were canceled in 2002 after NBC's purchase of KNTV.

==== Newscasts from KGO-TV ====
Five years later, KBWB entered into a news share agreement with ABC owned-and-operated station KGO-TV to produce another prime time newscast. On January 8, 2007, KGO began producing a weeknight-only 9 p.m. newscast for channel 20, titled ABC 7 News at 9:00 on Your TV20 (later ABC 7 News at 9:00 on KOFY). Starting September 3, 2018, KOFY re-aired the 9 p.m. weeknight newscast at 10 p.m. In addition, KOFY also airs the rebroadcast of KGO-TV's 11 p.m. newscast at 11:30 p.m. on weeknights. Until 2012, it also rebroadcast KGO's political discussion program Assignment 7 on Sunday evenings following the 6 p.m. news rebroadcast. In July 2019, KGO stopped production of the 9 p.m. newscast, with the final edition airing on July 19. Starting Monday, July 22, 2019, the 9 p.m. and 10 p.m. newscasts were replaced with syndicated programming. However, the rebroadcast of KGO's 6 p.m. weeknight newscast was reinstated at 7 p.m. On September 6, 2021, KOFY moved ABC 7 News from 7 p.m. to 8 p.m. With CNZ's shutdown of local operations for KOFY known, the final newscast produced by KGO aired on March 11, 2022.

== Technical information ==
=== Subchannels ===
Subchannels of KCNZ-CD, KMPX-LD, and KOFY-TV
License	Channel	Res.	Short name	Programming
KCNZ-CD	28.1	720p	KCNZ-CD	LATV
KCNZ-CD	28.2	480i	MariaV	Mariavision
KCNZ-CD	28.4	480i	JTV	Jewelry TV
KCNZ-CD	28.5	480i	JTV	Jewelry TV
KCNZ-CD	28.6	480i	ShopLC	Shop LC
KMPX-LD	18.1	480i	KMPX-LD	Jewelry TV
KOFY-TV	20.1	720p	KOFY-DT	Estrella TV
KOFY-TV	20.2	720p	Grit	Hot 97 TV
KOFY-TV	20.3	480i	PosiTiV	Positiv
KOFY-TV	20.6	480i	RCTV	Rare Collectibles TV
KOFY-TV	20.7	480i	CRTV	CRTV
KOFY-TV	20.8	480i	FunRoad	Fun Roads

Subchannel broadcast with MPEG-4 video

On July 1, 2007, KBWB began carrying programming from Azteca América on a new digital subchannel 20.4. It replaced KTNC-TV (channel 42) as the network's affiliate; that station switched to a Spanish-language independent format on that date.

KOFY-TV shut down its analog signal, over UHF channel 20, on June 12, 2009, as part of the federally mandated transition from analog to digital television. The station's digital signal remained on its pre-transition UHF channel 19, using virtual channel 20.

On July 28, 2011, High Plains Broadcasting (a partner company used by Newport Television to absolve ownership conflicts between certain stations owned by the Providence Equity Partners-backed group and Univision, which Providence holds an equity interest in) announced plans to sell Santa Rosa-based KFTY (channel 50) to Una Vez Más Holdings, with the intent to affiliate that station with Azteca América. On September 29, 2011, KFTY's affiliation with MeTV was discontinued and became KEMO-TV, adopting the callsign once used by KOFY-TV. KEMO-TV briefly mirrored the Azteca América programming that was still seen on KOFY 20.4; this ended shortly afterward, when KOFY discontinued the Azteca América feed.

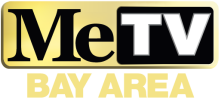
Former "MeTV Bay Area" logo for channel 20.2

On October 17, 2011, KOFY announced that it signed an affiliation agreement with MeTV; the station would carry the network on a new digital subchannel 20.2.

In July 2017, with the spectrum move, VieTV was moved to KCNS 38.3, replacing Comet, at this point; 20.3 was removed.

On March 22, 2018, MeTV was dropped from 20.2 and replaced with GetTV from 20.4.
