= Sky Link TV =

Chinese-language satellite TV channel

- Type: State media
- Country: United States
- Broadcast area: The Greater Los Angeles Area and the San Francisco Bay Area

Programming
- Languages: Mandarin, Cantonese
- Picture format: 720 x 480 (SDTV)/1280 x 720 (HDTV)

Ownership
- Owner: Guangzhou Broadcasting Network

History
- Launched: 1989

Links
- Website: www.skylinktv.us

Availability

Terrestrial
- UHF 44.3 (KXLA, Los Angeles)
- UHF 44.4 (KXLA, Los Angeles)
- UHF 4.2 (KRON, San Francisco)

Sky Link TV (Chinese: 天下衛視; pinyin: Tiān Xià Wèi Shì; Cantonese Yale: Tin1 Ha6 Wai6 Si6) is a Chinese satellite TV network in the United States owned by Guangzhou Broadcasting Network.

== History ==
In 1989, a Taiwanese American financial group founded North America Television (NATV) in Los Angeles. California. In 2009, it was purchased by a private Chinese company, Tian Xing Media Company. In 2013, it was purchased by a subsidiary of Guangzhou Broadcasting Network, GZ Television Media.

=== Jetsen Huashi Wangju Media & Sky Link TV Merger ===
On March 22, 2019, Jetsen Huashi Wangju Cultural Media Company announced a merger with Sky Link TV USA.

=== Timeline of events ===
- December 1, 1989 - North America Television (NATV) was founded in Los Angeles, California.
- 1990 - North America Television entered Charter Cable.
- December, 1992 - North America Television started branch company in New York City. It entered Time Warner Cable in New York City.
- 1999, North America Television closed New York branch company.
- December, 2001 - North America Television changed its name to Global Communication Group, Inc. started doing business as Sky Link TV.
- January 1, 2004 - Sky Link TV began live broadcast Rose Parade at every New Year's Day in Mandarin.
- August 10, 2006 - Sky Link TV joined Dish Network channel.
- November 9, 2007 - Sky Link TV joined Kylin internet TV channel.
- July 27, 2009 - Sky Link TV was sold to Tian Xing Media Company from China.
- December, 2009 - Sky Link TV launched its first free-to-air channel KVMD, UHF 31.5 for 24/7 Mandarin programs.
- September 17, 2012 - Sky Link TV was sold to Guangzhou Media American Co, Ltd.
- November 2, 2012 - Sky Link TV launched its second free-to-air channel: a brand new Cantonese TV Channel (KXLA UHF 44.4), thus became the first TV Station broadcast in both Mandarin and Cantonese in the United States 24/7.
- November 4, 2012 - Sky Link TV hosted Dayo Wong stand-up comedy show at Pasadena Civic Auditorium in Los Angeles.
- January 1, 2013 - Sky Link TV began to live broadcast Rose Parade in Cantonese and Mandarin language.
- May 15, 2014 - Sky Link TV launched its third channel (KXLA UHF 44.3) in Mandarin. Meanwhile, Sky Link TV ends its affiliation with KVMD 31.5.
- November 16, 2014 - Sky Link TV hosted another Dayo Wong stand-up comedy show in New York City, San Francisco, and Los Angeles.
- May 2015 - Sky Link TV ended Kylin TV internet TV streaming.
- September 18, 2015 - Sky Link TV signs an agreement with KRON-TV.
- September 29, 2015 - Sky Link TV SF goes on the air via KRON 4.2 and Comcast Xfinity channel 193.
- December 6, 2018 - Sky Link TV Names Nielsen New Local Television Measurement Provider
- March 22, 2019 - Jetsen Huashi Wangju Media & Sky Link TV Merger and Acquisition
