= New Tang Dynasty Television =

Multilingual Television Broadcaster affiliated with Falun Gong

NTD Television
- Type: Global television network Non-profit 501(c)(3)
- Broadcast area: USA, Canada, UK, Ireland, France, Germany, China, Taiwan and more
- Headquarters: New York City

Programming
- Languages: Multiple, mainly Chinese and English

Ownership
- Owner: Epoch Media Group

History
- Launched: December 3, 2001

Links
- Website: www.ntd.com

Availability

New Tang Dynasty Television
- Traditional Chinese: 新唐人電視台
- Simplified Chinese: 新唐人电视台
Transcriptions
Standard Mandarin
- Hanyu Pinyin: Xīntángrén Diànshìtái
Yue: Cantonese
- Jyutping: San1 tong4 jan4 Din6 si6 toi4

New Tang Dynasty Television (NTD Television) is a multilingual American television broadcaster founded by adherents of Falun Gong, a new religious movement, and based in New York City. The station was founded in 2001 as a Chinese-language broadcaster, and has since expanded its language offerings; in July 2020, it launched its 24/7 English channel which broadcasts nationwide in the U.S. and UK. It is under the Epoch Media Group, a consortium which also includes the newspaper The Epoch Times. The Epoch Media Group's news sites and YouTube channels have promoted conspiracy theories including QAnon, anti-vaccine misinformation and false claims of fraud in the 2020 United States presidential election.

== History ==
NTD was founded in 2001 by practitioners of the Falun Gong new religious movement. The station has a regular focus on the promotion of traditional Chinese culture and western classical arts, and devotes extensive news coverage to Chinese human rights issues, scrutinizing alleged abuses of power by the Chinese Communist Party. The name was chosen to invoke the ancient Tang dynasty that the company considers "the golden age of Chinese spirituality and civilization ... known for its high moral standards and unparalleled cultural achievements."

The Christian Science Monitor in 2004 called NTD "the first independent Chinese-language TV station in the US". The Wall Street Journal said in 2007 that NTD "serves as a platform for China's pro-democracy dissidents, who have been torn by internal squabbling and lack of organization".

In 2009, NTD had an income of $5.3 million, including $2.4 million from 3,000 donations. In 2011, NTD had a staff of 80, nearly all volunteers.

By 2016, NTD's revenues were $7.4 million. In 2017, they more than doubled to $18 million, according to reports from the U.S. Internal Revenue Service.

NTD started broadcasting to the UK on Sky TV on February 22, 2021 on channel 190 (previously used for MyTV channel), and subsequently on Freeview channel 271.

As of 2022, NTD reached about 6 million US households.

== Relationship with Falun Gong ==
NTD, along with The Epoch Times and Sound of Hope, was founded by Falun Gong practitioners who had immigrated to the West. Many of its staff are Falun Gong adherents who volunteer their time and services. In an interview with the Wall Street Journal, the former president Zhong Lee stated that the company's original purpose was to "speak as the voice of Falun Gong", and that "media can also play a big role pushing democracy in China".

NTD is one of the organizations that Falun Gong founder Li Hongzhi has referred to as "our media", along with The Epoch Times newspaper and the Shen Yun dance troupe.

== Content ==
NTD broadcasts programming regularly on its moderated YouTube channels, which include NTD Evening News, NTD Business News, China in Focus, Capital Report, NTD UK News and other shows.

In 2019, NTD released a docudrama produced by Steve Bannon, the former Breitbart News chairman and advisor to Donald Trump. The film, Claws of the Red Dragon, is about the telecom company Huawei and the Chinese government. Bannon said that, in his dealings with NTD, the group was always able to provide enough funding when he asked for it.

=== Cultural competitions ===
NTD also operates a series of competitions. These competitions include the "International Chinese Culinary competition," "Chinese Martial Arts competition," and "Classical Chinese Dance competition," with a shared emphasis on aiming to revive and preserve traditional Chinese culture. The "Han Couture competition" was launched in 2010 with the "mission to spread the classical Chinese apparel culture around the world, and in the process promote the values of integrity and beauty it embodies." In regards to these different competitions, scholar Benjamin Penny found that they "make the dual claims that the Chinese Communist Party is responsible for the destruction of traditional Chinese culture in all its forms, and that Fǎlún Gōng respects, preserves, and celebrates it."

=== Promotion of misinformation and conspiracy theories ===
NTD has produced videos about topics such as a supposed connection between Wall Street and COVID-19, and a supposed plan by the People's Republic of China to destroy America. NTD's Edge of Wonder YouTube channel has promoted QAnon, Moon landing conspiracy theories, the deep state conspiracy theory and 9/11 conspiracy theories.

On April 7, 2020, NTD uploaded a video released by The Epoch Times. The video was flagged by Facebook as "partly false" for "the unsupported hypothesis that SARS-CoV-2 is a bioengineered virus released from a Wuhan research laboratory." The video featured Judy Mikovits, an anti-vaccination activist. The fact-checker Health Feedback said of the video that "several of its core scientific claims are false and its facts, even when accurate, are often presented in a misleading way".

On August 6, 2020, Facebook removed hundreds of fake accounts by a digital company called TruthMedia that promoted Epoch Times and NTD content and pro-Trump conspiracy theories about COVID-19 and protests in the United States. The operation included 303 Facebook accounts, 181 pages, 44 Facebook groups and 31 Instagram accounts, which in total were followed by more than 2 million people. Snopes and NBC News reported that TruthMedia had ties to the Epoch Media Group, but Stephen Gregory, publisher of The Epoch Times, denied this.

In October 2021, NTD aired a report claiming that more people were dying due to side effects from the COVID-19 vaccine than the virus itself in Taiwan. The fact-checking website Polygraph.info found that the majority of people who died after vaccination had succumbed to pre-existing conditions or chronic diseases.

On September 23, 2022, NTD promoted rumors that a coup against Xi Jinping had occurred and that he was under house arrest. The rumors went viral on social media. However these claims have been assessed by fact-checkers and researchers as unsubstantiated and characterized as misinformation. Xi made a public appearance on September 27, after a brief absence since mid-September.

== Censorship ==
In January 2008, the Chinese embassy in the United States discouraged viewers from watching or attending NTD's Chinese New Year galas and accused NTD of spreading "anti-China propaganda" and "distorting Chinese culture".

In June 2008, the media watchdog Reporters Without Borders (RSF) accused Eutelsat, a European satellite operator, of closing down transmissions of NTD to Asia through its W5 satellite to appease the Chinese government, and appealed to Eutelsat CEO Giuliano Berretta to resume the broadcasts. RSF said it possessed a recording of a Beijing employee of Eutelsat revealing a "premeditated, politically motivated decision". Eutelsat responded that the shutdown resulted solely from a technical failure of its W5 satellite, denied the validity of the conversation alleged by RSF, and said that it still broadcast NTD to Europe. The International Federation of Journalists said Eutelsat was capable of resuming NTD transmissions to Asia, and it and members of the European Parliament called on Eutelsat to do so.

In June 2010, the Canadian Prime Minister's Office canceled a press conference that NTD and The Epoch Times would have attended so that General Secretary of the Chinese Communist Party Hu Jintao would not come into contact with the broadcaster, allegedly following terms from the Chinese consulate. According to the Toronto Star, such press conferences are usually a standard procedure for foreign leaders visiting the Parliament, and the cancellation was seen as an extraordinary measure to keep NTD away from the Chinese leader.
