= The Frisc =

San Francisco news site

- Formation: 2017
- Location: San Francisco, CA
- Editor-in-Chief: Alex Lash
- Affiliations: Institute for Nonprofit News and Local Independent Online News Publishers
- Website: www.thefrisc.com

The Frisc is a local news nonprofit, founded in 2017, that covers San Francisco. Its name refers to a nickname of San Francisco. The site launched with a focus on housing policy while also covering issues (and solutions) around city government, homelessness, street safety, transit, education and the environment. The site also includes guides for things to do, particularly in nature in San Francisco.

The Frisc has six regular contributors, including some just starting their career, and publishes three or more stories a week. The outlet relies on donations and announced in September 2026 that it would shut down by the end of the year.

== Awards ==
The San Francisco Press Club awarded The Frisc first-place for videography in 2023.

The Society of Professional Journalists NorCal chapter gave two stories by The Frisc awards in 2025.

== See also ==
- Mass media in the San Francisco Bay Area
- San José Spotlight
