= Sunset Dunes =

Park in San Francisco, California

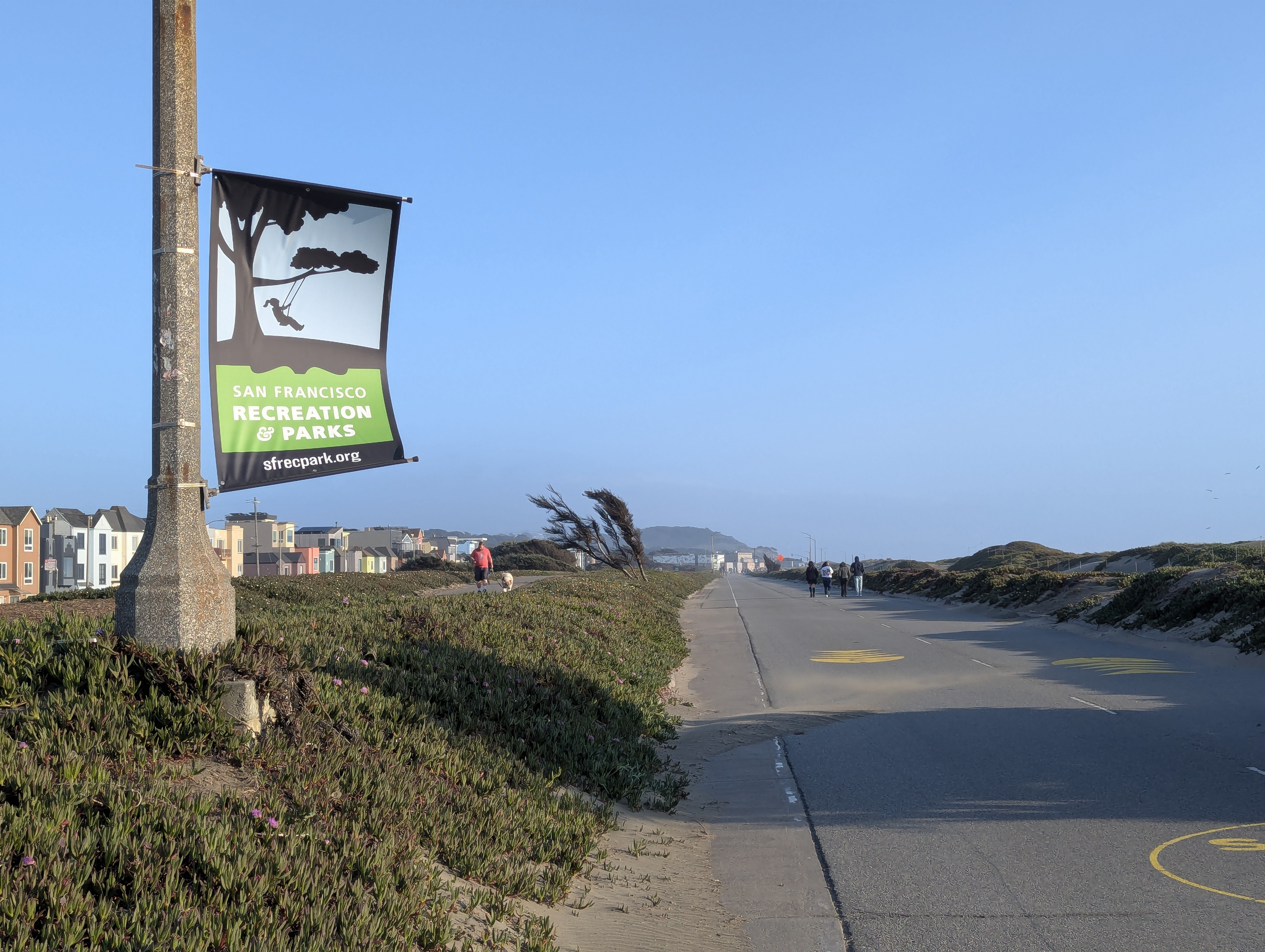
- May 2025
- Interactive map of Sunset Dunes
- Type: Urban park, Linear park
- Location: San Francisco, California, United States
- Coordinates: 37.7510°N 122.5087°W
- Area: 77 acres (31 ha; 0.120 mi^{2}; 0.31 km^{2})
- Opened: April 12, 2025
- Owner: San Francisco Recreation & Parks Department
- Operator: San Francisco Recreation & Parks Department
- Open: All year, 5 a.m. to Midnight
- Parking: Street parking
- Public transit: Muni
- Website: Official website

Sunset Dunes is a 2 mi (3.2 km) long public urban park next to Ocean Beach on the West Side of San Francisco, California. The park is located on the former location of the Upper Great Highway between Lincoln Way and Sloat Boulevard. The 77-acre (31 ha) park opened on April 12, 2025, making it the largest pedestrianization project in California's history. The park converted 17 acres of roadway into separated walking and cycling paths with the coastal side for slower speeds and the inland side for faster speeds. The park has art installations, exercise equipment, log benches and hammocks.

== History ==
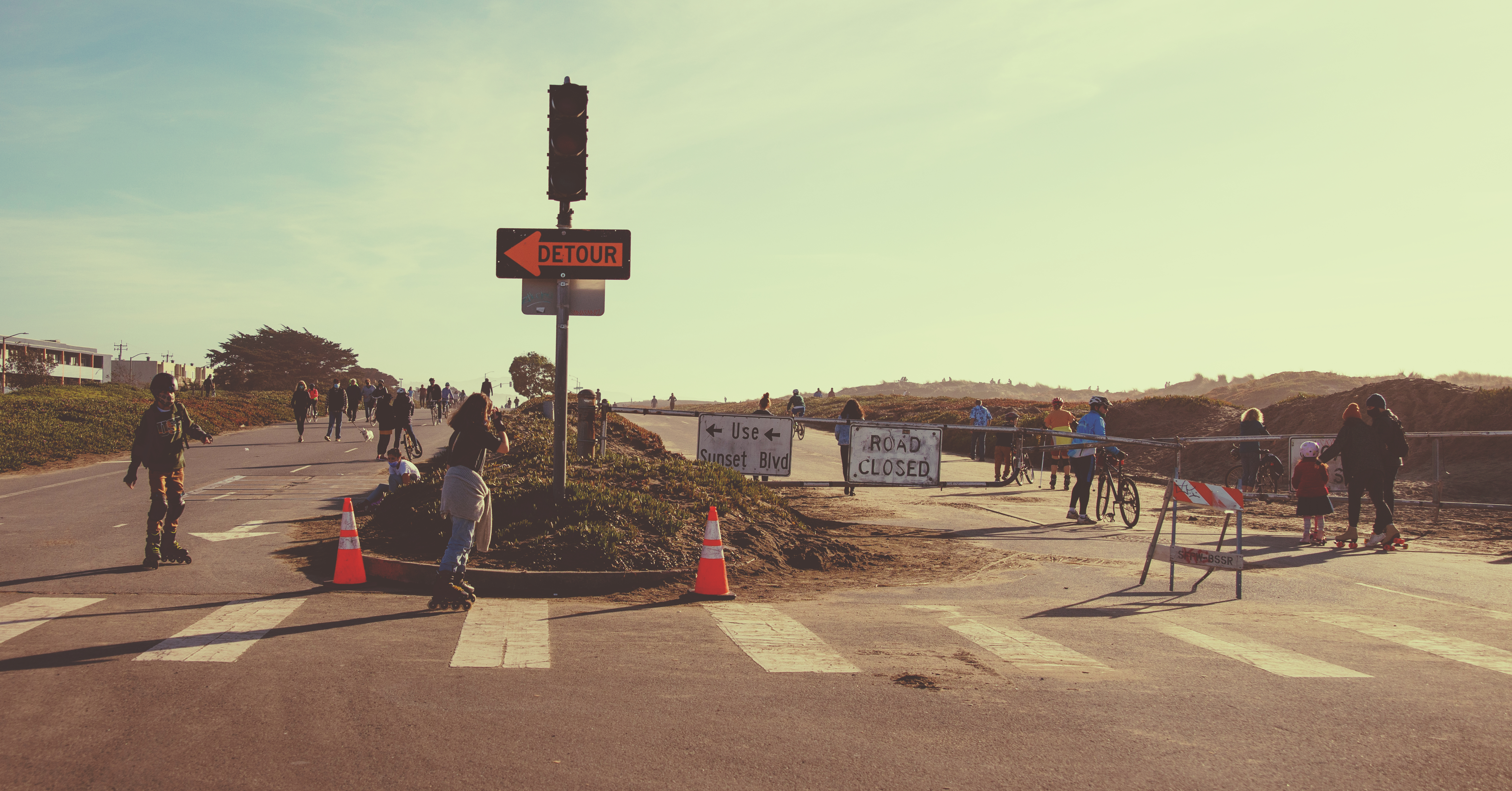
January 2021 on 'Great Highway Park'

The upper portion of the Great Highway between Lincoln Way and Sloat Boulevard was closed to motor vehicles on certain days starting in April 2020 to provide San Franciscans space to social distance during the COVID-19 pandemic. Previously, the Upper Great Highway would close around 27 times annually for sand and debris removal. In January 2022, The New York Times ranked the use of the Great Highway for biking and walking #18 out of "52 Places for a Changed World," chosen for ethical tourism features.

In 2024, a ballot measure known as Proposition K was proposed by San Francisco supervisors Joel Engardio and Myrna Melgar to permanently close the Upper Great Highway and repurpose the space as a new park. On November 9, 2024, Proposition K passed 55% to 45%.

After being closed to car traffic on March 14th, the park opened on April 12, 2025. At least 13,000 people visited the park on its opening day. Volunteers and city workers helped to install benches, remove traffic lights, add wooden wayfinding signs to nearby local businesses, and add exercise equipment. It quickly became the third most popular San Francisco park on weekdays behind JFK Promenade and Marina Green.

Since the partial closure of the Great Highway, District 4 (which includes Sunset Dunes) Supervisor Joel Engardio was recalled from office due to his support for Proposition K. His appointed replacement Alan Wong backed returning vehicular traffic to the Great Highway but failed to place a measure on the ballot. In 2026, an initiative to return cars to the Great Highway during weekdays qualified after a citizen-led signature gathering campaign. On November 3, 2026, Proposition G failed 34% to 66%, securing the future of Sunset Dunes as a permanent park.

== Park planning ==
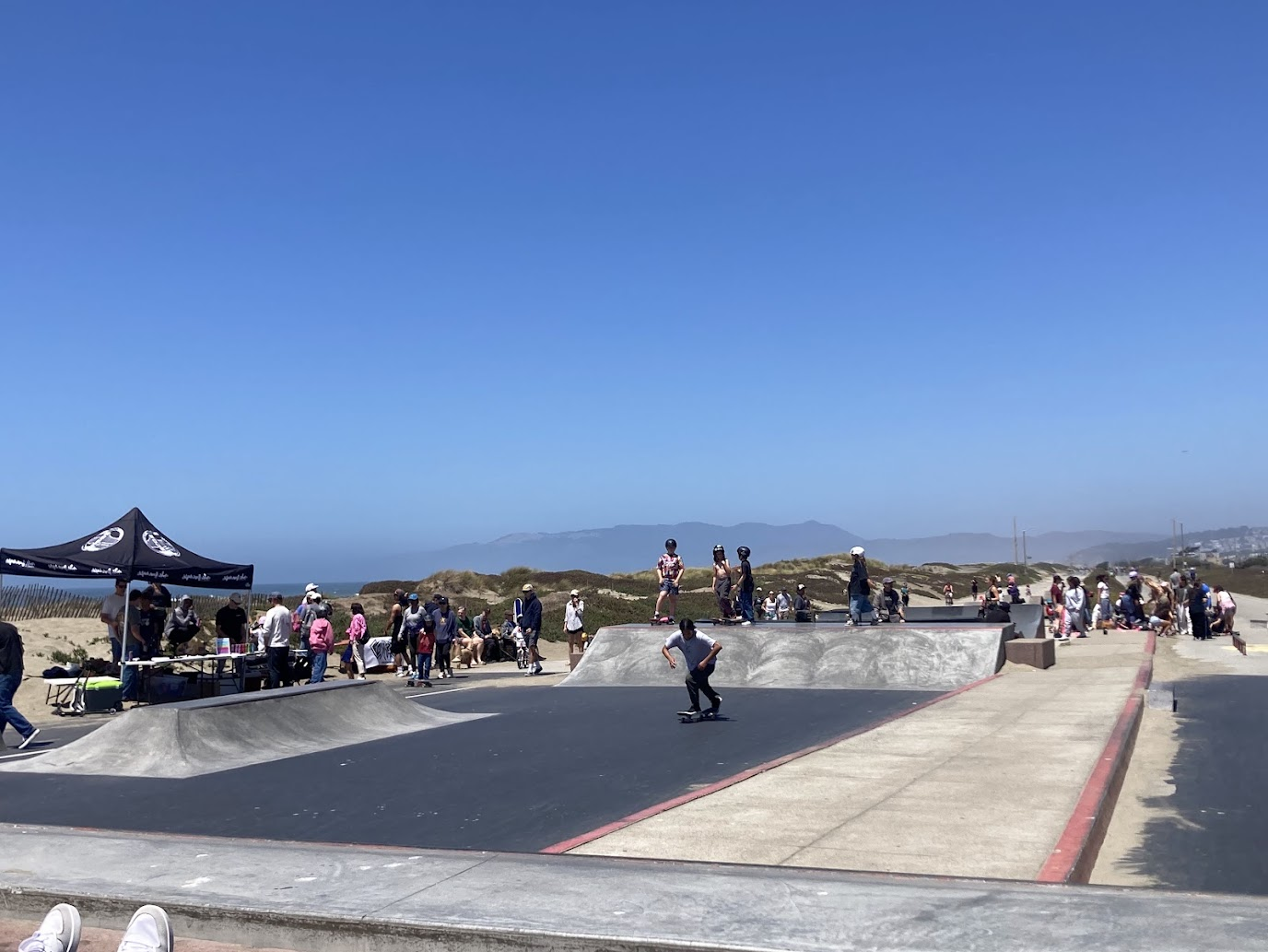
A skate jam at San Francisco's Sunset Dunes Park in 2026

Since the park's official opening in April 2025, San Francisco Recreation and Parks Department has initiated a Community Engagement Process to gather stakeholder feedback on the interim improvements and ideas for the future of park space. The community engagement process, along with feasibility and technical studies, will support a Visioning and Planning Process. The San Francisco Recreation and Park Department received a $1 million grant from the California State Coastal Conservancy Board to help convert the Upper Great Highway into a park including restoring coastal habitat. New transit infrastructure upgrades were conducted on the roads around the Great Highway to accommodate shifting travel patterns.

In 2025, Heather Knight compared the fight over the conversion of a road to a park to the Embarcadero Freeway, the removal of the off-ramp from the Central Freeway in Hayes Valley and the fight to create JFK Promenade which all generated substantial backlash at the time. In 2025, a skate park opened on Sunset Dunes and the LA Times included it on its list of 12 new things to do in San Francisco. Shipwreck Cove, a pirate-themed playground, opened in September 2026.

== Traffic impacts ==
Many residents of the Sunset and Richmond District oppose repurposing the roadway as a park due to concerns about traffic and travel times. KQED in 2026 cited SFMTA officials as saying traffic was below pre-pandemic levels in the Sunset District, and it has not negatively affected roadway safety in the neighborhood. The San Francisco Chronicle and The Frisc both analyzed city data and found no substantial increase in commute times, arguing that some commutes also became faster since its closure.

== Attendance ==
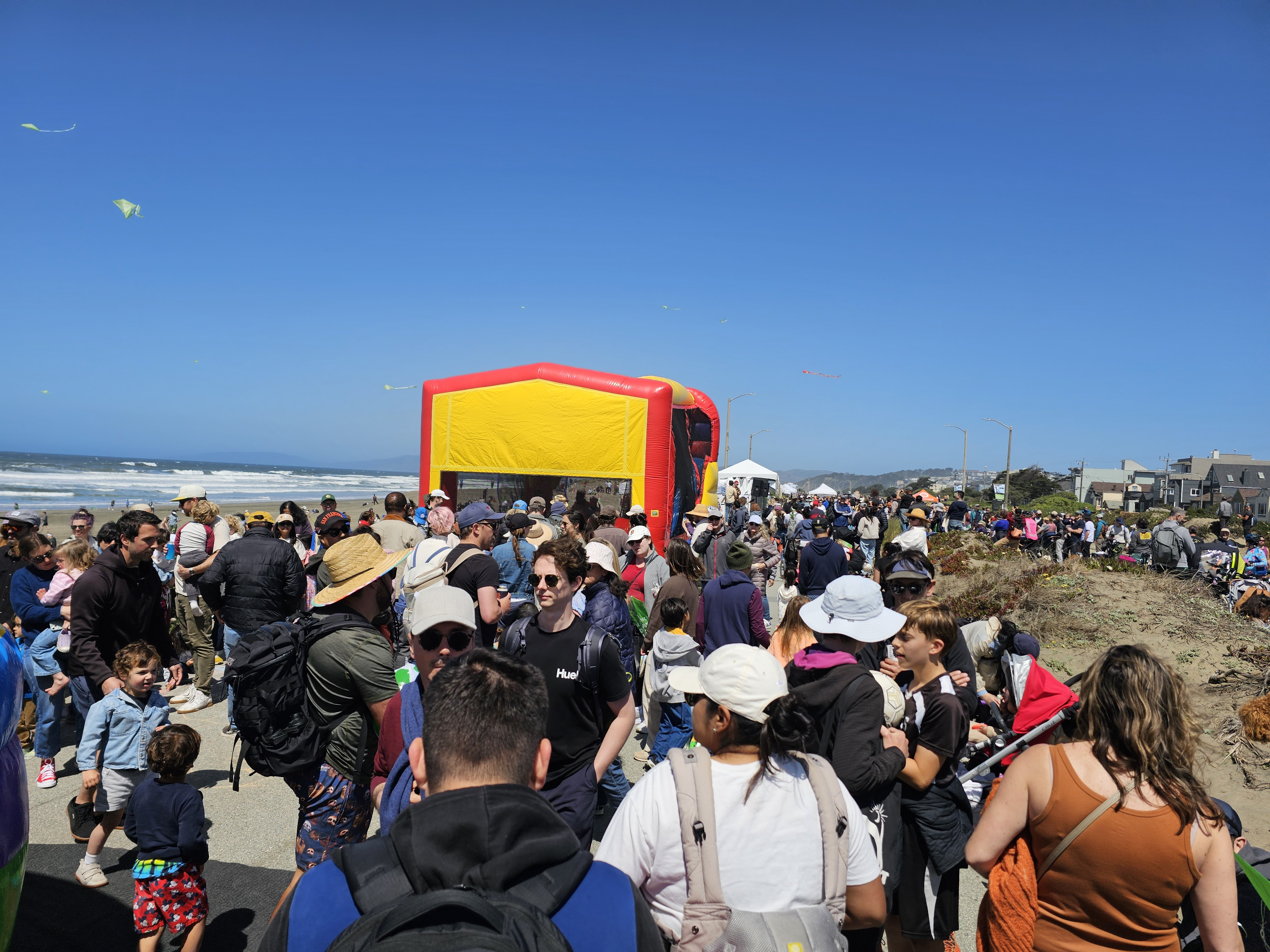
Opening day of Sunset Dunes on April 12, 2025

The park has become among the city's most visited, especially among District 4 residents, with park officials estimating 1.7 million visitors per year as of 2026.

== Name ==
Before receiving its official name of Sunset Dunes, the park was referred to as Ocean Beach Park, Great Highway Park, or the Great Walkway.

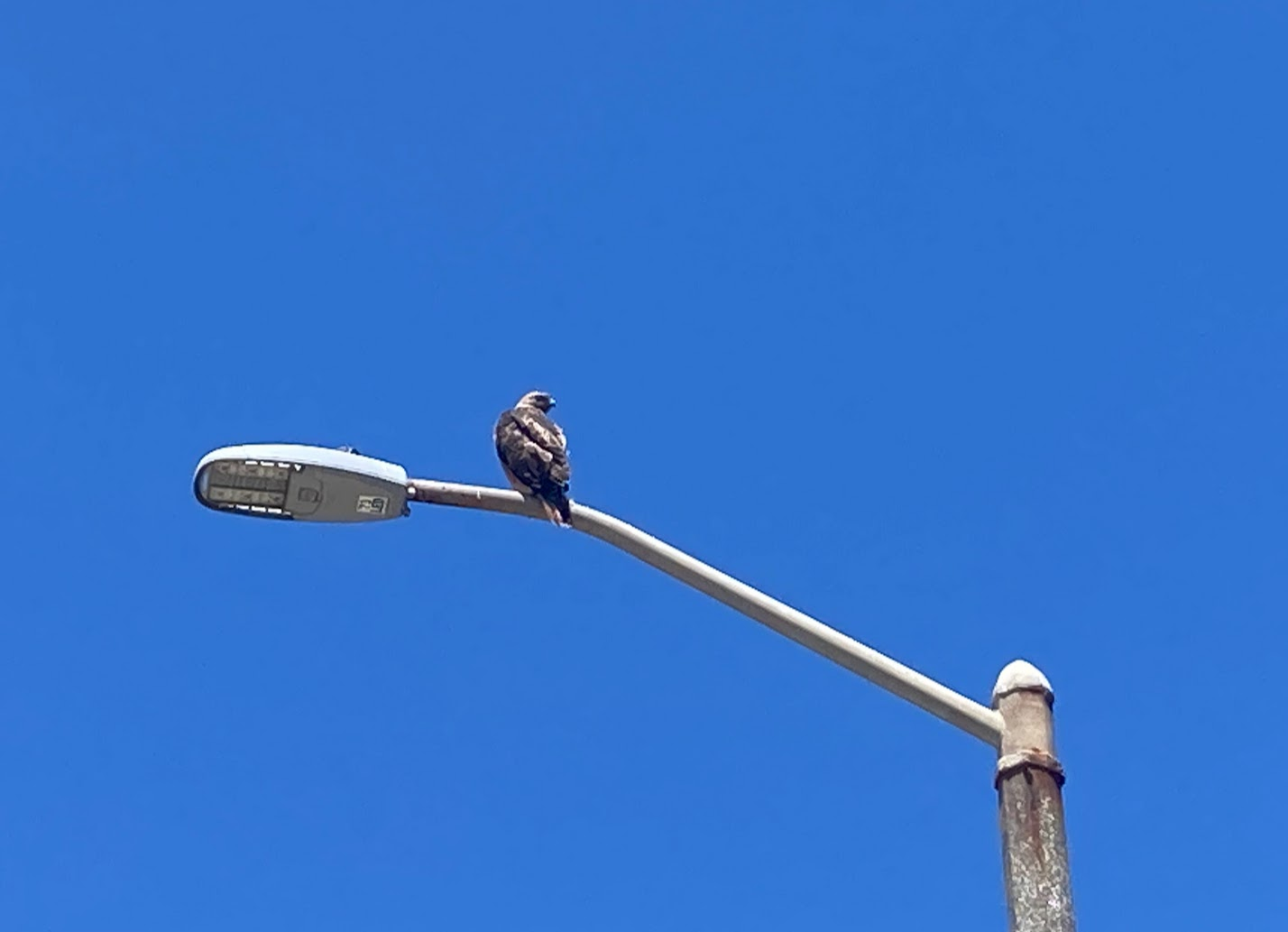
A red-tailed hawk in San Francisco's Sunset Dunes Park

The park's name was selected following community engagement. The San Francisco Recreation & Parks Department initially received 4,200 name suggestions between March 1 and 16, 2025. These name suggestions were narrowed down to 3,200 potential names by Recreation & Parks Department staff members to eliminate inappropriate names. After a community meeting attended by 240 participants, 15 potential names that ensured "historical significance, connection to nature and geography, and iconic placemaking" were selected from the 3,200. A citywide survey was held from March 20 to April 2 to choose a name from the 15 potential names. The five finalists of this survey were Sunset Dunes, Playland Parkway, Great Parkway, Fog Line, and Plover Parkway. The San Francisco Recreation and Park Commission selected Sunset Dunes as the park's name from a group of five finalists on April 9, 2025.

== Wildlife ==
Wildlife that live in the park and nearby beach include coyotes, the Botta’s pocket gopher, long-tailed weasels, seagulls, ospreys, red-tailed hawks, and the endangered Western snowy plover among others.

== See also ==
- Panhandle
- Tunnel Tops Park
