= San José Spotlight =

Non-profit news organization

- Type: Daily news website
- Format: Online
- Founder(s): Ramona Giwargis; Josh Barousse
- Founded: January 2019; 7 years ago
- Headquarters: San Jose, California, United States
- Website: sanjosespotlight.com

San José Spotlight is a nonprofit independent news website that reports on issues affecting San Jose and Santa Clara County in California. Founded in 2019, the site reported 2.3 million readers as of 2023. The publication has won regional and statewide journalism awards for its investigative reporting and coverage of local government, business, and socioeconomic issues in California's Silicon Valley.

== History ==
San José Spotlight was founded by San Jose natives and husband-and-wife team Josh Barousse and Ramona Giwargis. Giwargis was a writer for The Mercury News from 2014 to 2017, where she covered local politics and city hall. She met Barousse while reporting on his failed 2016 election bid for city council. After Giwargis left the Mercury News in 2017, the two of them moved to Las Vegas, where they discovered the nonprofit newspaper Nevada Independent. The success of the Independent's nonprofit business model motivated their desire to recreate such a model in their hometown of San Jose, which at the time they perceived to be a news desert. The duo launched San José Spotlight in January 2019. From 2024 to 2026, the organization's offices were located at CreaTV San Jose's Open San José center.

== Organization ==
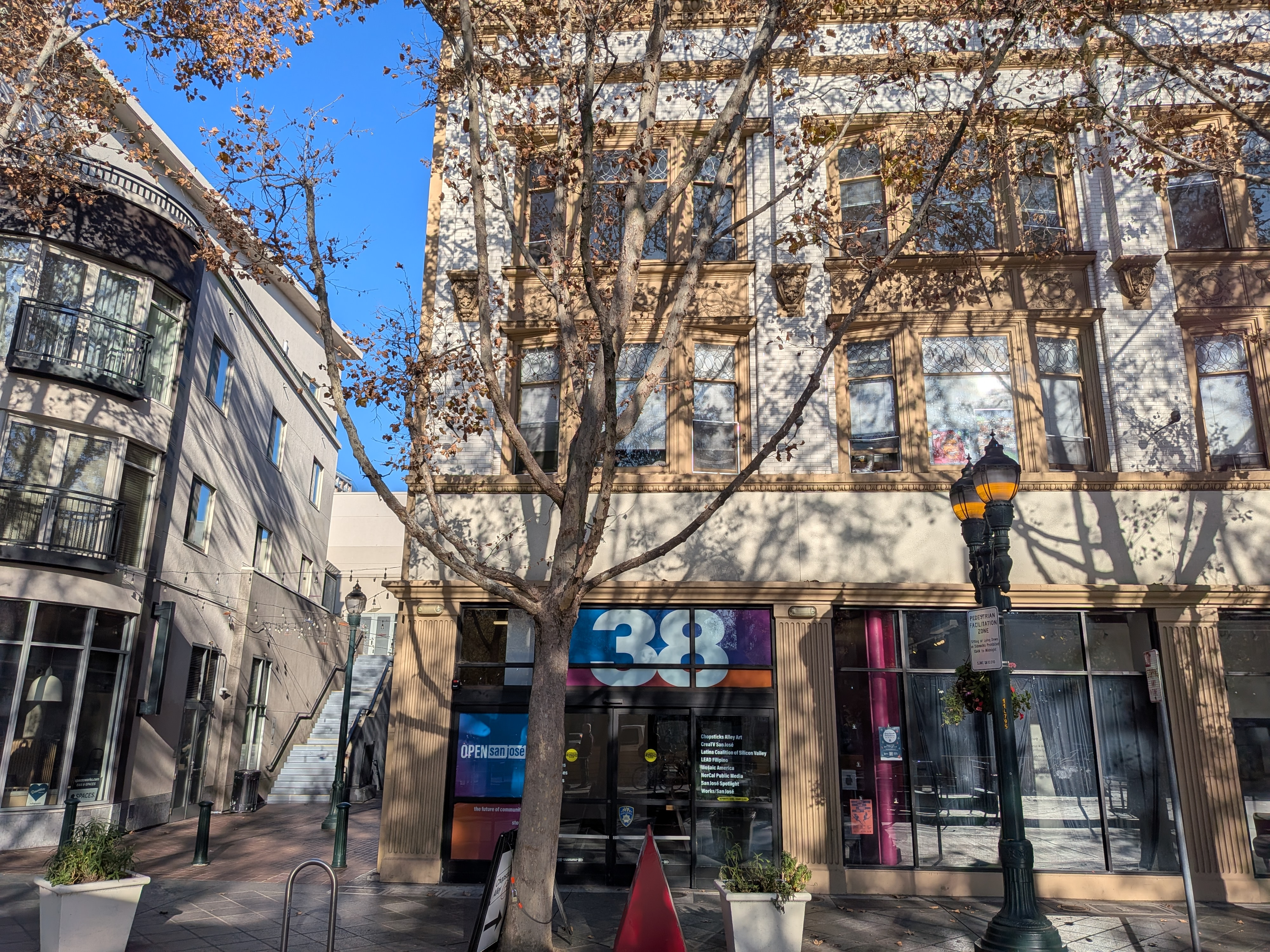
The Open San José center where the paper's offices were originally based

Ramona Giwargis serves as the CEO of San José Spotlight, Josh Barousse serves as the executive director, and Thi Tran serves as the director of development. The organization has a board of directors and includes a staff of two full-time editors and seven reporters, as of 2025. The Spotlight also has a volunteer advisory board made up of local academic and nonprofit leaders.

San José Spotlight has no paywall, providing its content to viewers free of charge. The organization receives funding from a variety of sources, including corporate sponsorships, reader donations, foundation grants, advertising, and events. A list of the organization's top donors is published on the website. The Spotlight's revenue grew from $379,000 in 2019 to over $1 million in 2023.

The website reported 2.3 million readers in 2023. The organization maintains a newsletter with approximately 13,000 subscribers. In addition to English-language content, the Spotlight provides translations of its articles into Spanish and Vietnamese.

== Reporting ==
San José Spotlight focuses primarily on local political and business news and independent, investigative reporting. Stories cover topics relevant to San Jose as well as surrounding communities in Santa Clara County and Silicon Valley, including Sunnyvale, Santa Clara, Cupertino, Los Gatos, Campbell, and Milpitas.

In 2020, San José Spotlight CEO Giwargis criticized then-mayor Sam Liccardo for excluding the news outlet from a daily news digest provided to San Jose city staff. The city's reasoning for the exclusion was that they had a policy of not including online-only papers unless the paper was "nationally recognized," a rule that Institute for Nonprofit News director Sue Cross called "outdated and harmful to the public."

In 2021, San José Spotlight reported that mayor Liccardo was evading California's public records laws by using his private email for official city correspondence and subsequently deleting conversations from his official government email account. Liccardo's use of private email was first revealed in the context of him discussing a constituent's concerns about corruption in the city's police department. The reporting led to a lawsuit filed in 2022 by the Spotlight and the First Amendment Coalition against Liccardo and the city of San Jose for violating the California Public Records Act, alleging a pattern of using private email and texts for official communication, redacting information from public records requests, and failing to adequately search records in response to public records requests. In August 2023, a Santa Clara County Superior Court judge ruled in favor of the Spotlight, forcing the city of San Jose to release hundreds of withheld documents and ultimately pay out $500,000 to the plaintiffs.

In 2022, a staffer for Match.com founder, Valley Water board member, and 2022 Santa Clara County Assessor election candidate Gary Kremen came forward to San José Spotlight with accusations against Kremen of various inappropriate acts. The Spotlight reported that among other things, Kremen had shared with the staffer a file folder containing nude photos of himself and his girlfriend, and he refused to delete them despite being asked to by the staffer. The accusations ultimately led to Kremen's withdrawal from the County Assessor's race as well as an internal investigation by Valley Water that found that he had verbally abused employees and exceeded his authority as a board member.

=== Awards ===
San José Spotlight has won various journalism awards from both local and national groups. In 2020, the organization won the Publisher of the Year award in the "small" category from Local Independent Online News (LION) Publishers.

At the 2023 Greater Bay Area Journalism Awards hosted by the San Francisco Press Club, the Spotlight won first place for Overall Excellence as well as first place for Investigative Reporting for covering the Gary Kremen nude photos scandal. The organization also won first place for News Story for documenting the effects of underinvestment in housing, schools, and transportation on the people of East San Jose.

The California News Publishers Association has recognized the Spotlight at its annual California Journalism Awards. In 2021, the publication received first-place awards for its breaking news coverage of the VTA light rail shooting, reporting of wealthy South Bay residents cutting ahead of vulnerable populations to get COVID-19 vaccines, and documenting of the homeless crisis in Silicon Valley. The paper also received first-place awards in 2023 for its coverage of the Liccardo public records scandal, the collapse of Silicon Valley Bank, the potential effects of a city workers' strike, and the arrest of Joanne Marian Segovia, a San Jose Police Offices' Association director who was charged with smuggling fentanyl into the United States through her home.

== See also ==
- Mass media in the San Francisco Bay Area
- Lookout Santa Cruz
- Voices of Monterey Bay
