= Great Highway =

Road on the West Side of San Francisco, California

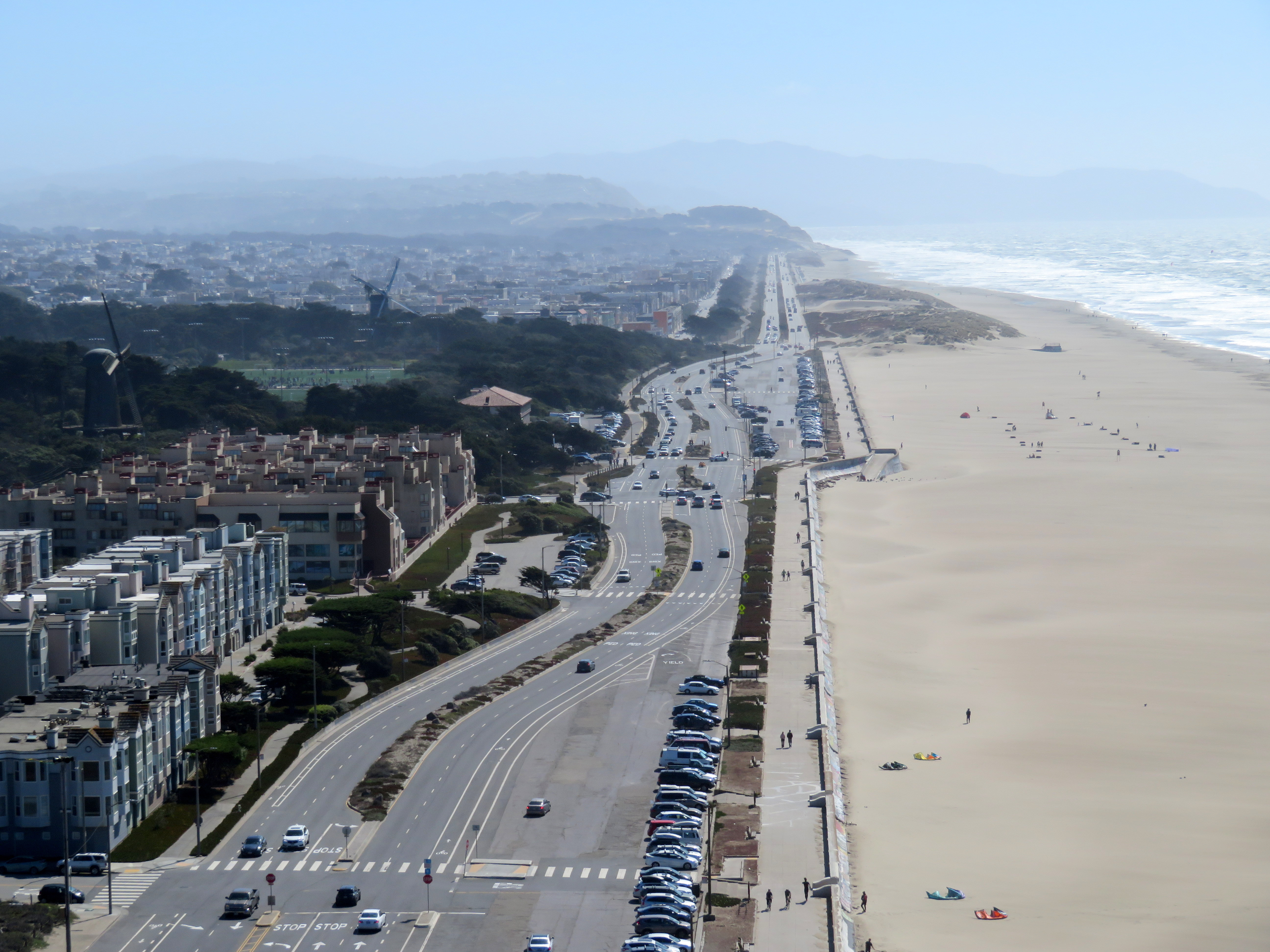
- The Great Highway, San Francisco, California, looking south from Sutro Heights. The straight section in the distance was permanently closed to traffic in 2025.
- Interactive map of Great Highway
- Length: 3.5 mi (5.6 km)
- Location: San Francisco
- Coordinates: 37.7506°N 122.5086°W
- North end: Point Lobos Avenue
- South end: Skyline Boulevard

The Great Highway is a road located on the West Side of San Francisco that forms the city's western edge along the Pacific coast. Built in 1929, it runs for approximately 3.5 miles (5.6 km) next to Ocean Beach. Its southern end is at Skyline Boulevard (State Route 35) near Lake Merced; it extends to Point Lobos Avenue and the Cliff House at its northern end.

In 2020, a portion of the road was closed to vehicular traffic in response to the COVID-19 pandemic, reopening to weekday traffic in 2021. In 2025, the portion of the roadway that was pedestrianized on a pilot basis was permanently closed to vehicular traffic following a successful voter initiative. Subsequently, two miles (3.2 km) of the Great Highway became Sunset Dunes Park.

== Description ==
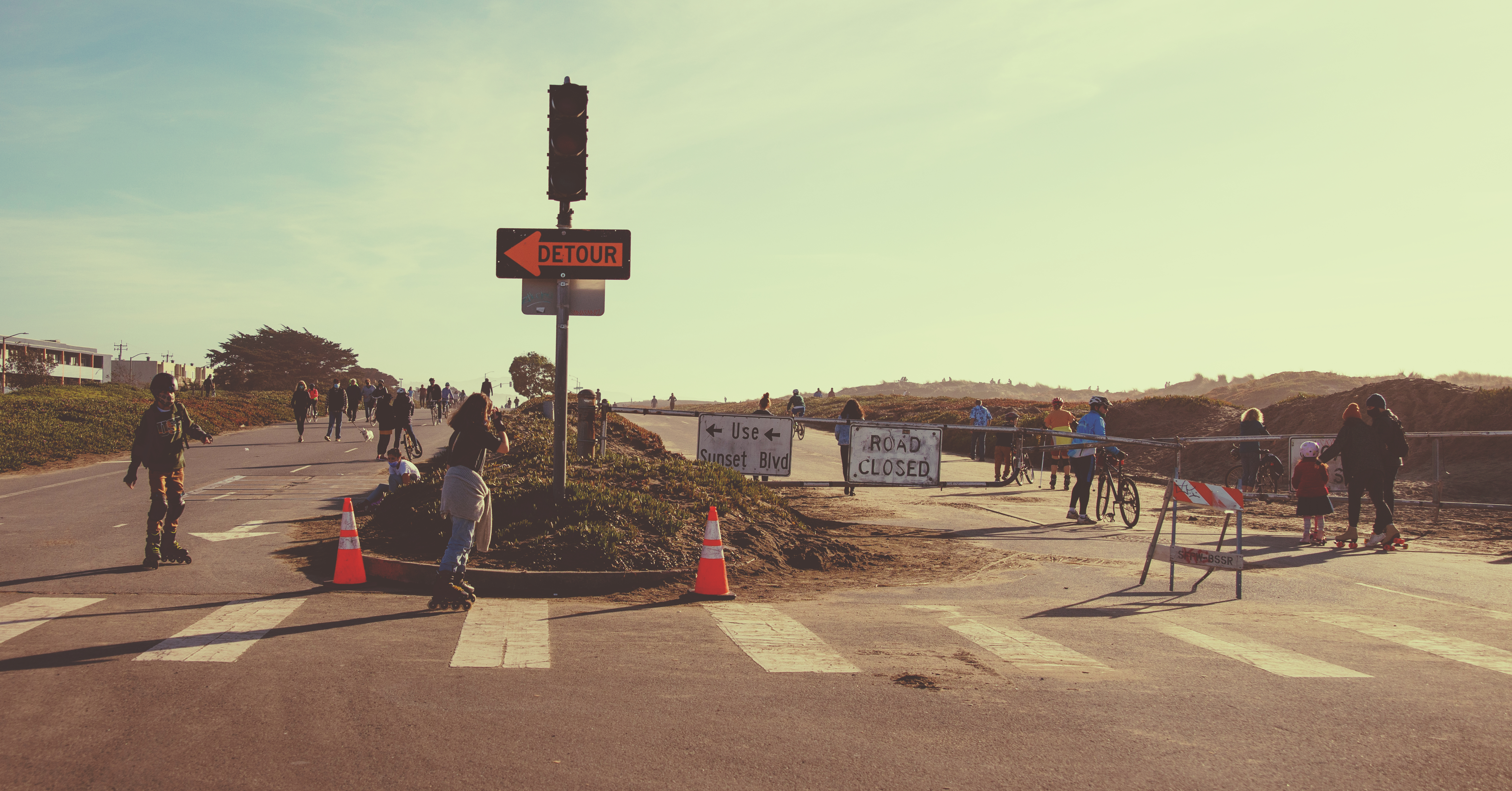
The road closed to motor vehicles in January 2021.

The Great Highway is a four-lane divided road built in 1929 that is approximately 3.5 miles (5.6 km) long and runs next to the Pacific Ocean along to Ocean Beach on the west side of San Francisco. The Great Highway starts at Skyline Boulevard and runs north to Point Lobos Avenue and the Cliff House in the Outer Richmond neighborhood of San Francisco. It forms the western border of Golden Gate Park with two windmills, the Dutch Windmill and the Murphy Windmill at the northwestern and southwestern corners of the park along the highway. Both windmills were built to pump water into Golden Gate Park. Officially, this roadway is known as the Upper Great Highway.

As a north–south throughway, this section of the highway does not provide access to destinations in the nearby Sunset neighborhood, other than Lincoln Way and Sloat Boulevard. It is a recreational street with no car-usable turn-offs in the two miles (3.2 km) between Lincoln and Sloat. This provides limited use for local traffic, so the Lower Great Highway is a parallel frontage road immediately adjacent to the east of the main Great Highway, which features residences on one side and a mixed-use trail in the median between the two roads. To discourage high-speed traffic, speed humps are stationed every few blocks to augment stop signs at nearly every Lower Great Highway intersection.

The N Judah, a San Francisco Municipal Railway streetcar line, ends at Great Highway and Judah, while the L Taraval, another streetcar line, ends two blocks from the Great Highway at Wawona and 46th Avenue.

== History ==
The Great Highway was laid out in the Humphreys-Potter map of 1868 which laid out the streets of San Francisco's newly acquired Outside Lands, including the Richmond and Sunset districts.

In the 1890s, a railway line was run along the route of the Great Highway from its Southern terminus to Golden Gate Park in order to build the California Midwinter International Exposition of 1894. Although these tracks were removed in February 1895, the berm that supported them is still visible on the East side of the Great Highway today, supporting a multi-use pathway.

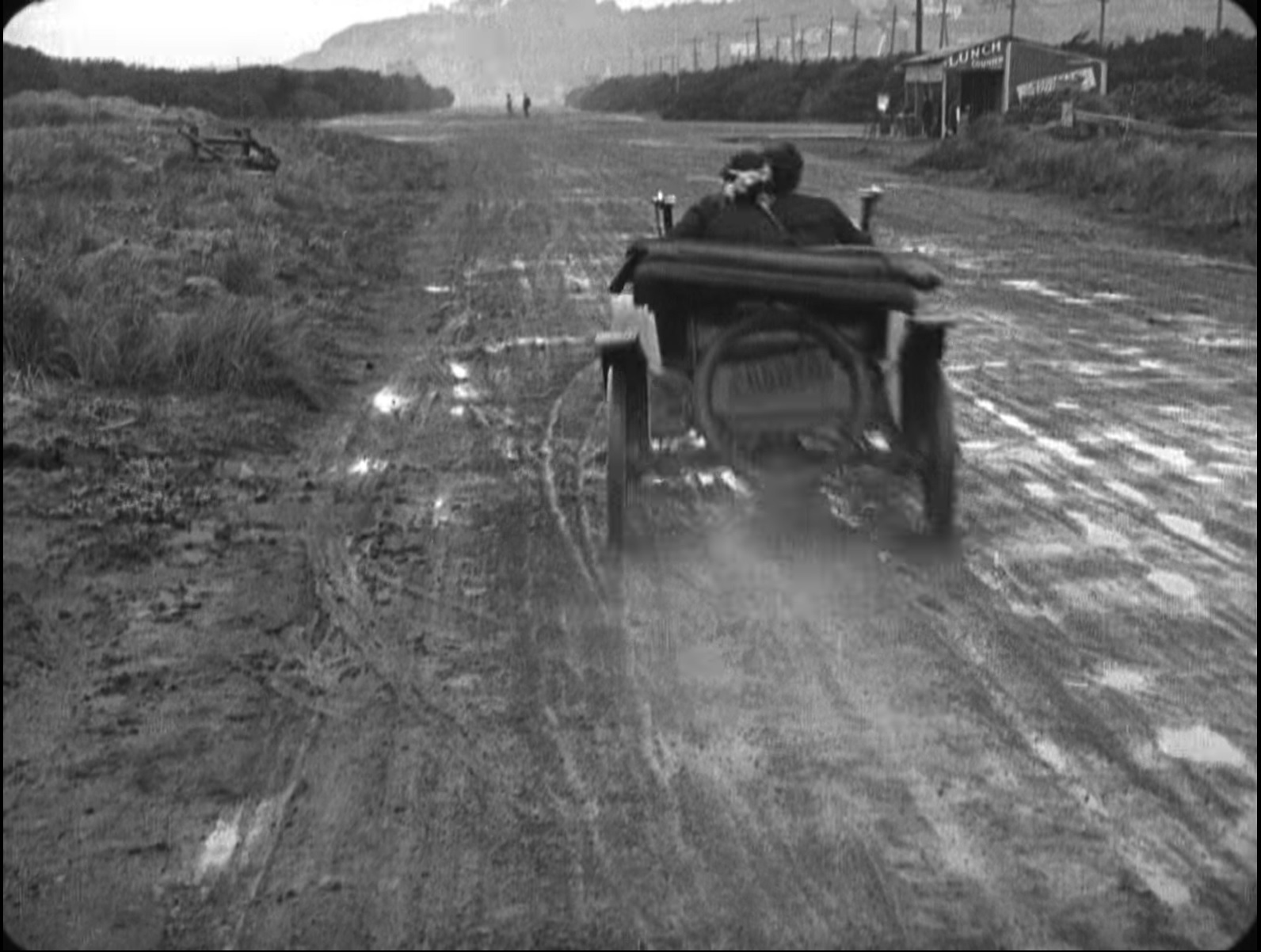
In the 1915 film A Jitney Elopement, Charlie Chaplin and Edna Purviance drive on the Great Highway in San Francisco.

In the early 1900s, as the automobile gained popularity, efforts were made to improve and widen the Great Highway as well as protect it from erosion. Its condition in 1915 is visible in a Charlie Chaplin film, A Jitney Elopement. Its development was funded by voter approval of the Boulevard Bond in 1927. City engineer Michael O'Shaughnessy’s Ocean Beach Esplanade was completed in 1928, along with a newly paved Great Highway in 1929. The concrete seawall survives to this day. The name remained "Great Highway," even though some expected the new boulevard to receive a new name, like "Ocean Boulevard."

During the Hot Rod era of the 1950s–1960s, the Great Highway was a popular destination for owners of modified cars and others who wished to engage in rolling drag races. In the 1980s, San Francisco converted the highway from eight lanes to four lanes with an underwater stormwater transport box to adhere to the California Coastal Act and Clean Water Act.

=== Pedestrianization of middle section ===
The two-mile-long (3-kilometer) middle section of the Great Highway between Lincoln Way and Sloat Boulevard, known as the Upper Great Highway, was the subject of a tug-of-war between motorists and park advocates. Between August 2021 and March 2025 it was opened to people on holidays, weekends, and Friday afternoons and evenings to provide recreational access, but remained open to traffic the rest of the week. This hybrid setup was a compromise between residents who wanted a full reopening to cars and other residents who preferred the section of highway to become a permanent 17-acre (7-hectare) park.

Earlier, the segment had been fully pedestrianized on a temporary basis in April 2020 during a COVID-19 stay at home order, a move that led to some people referring to the segment as the "Great Walkway". City officials reported the closure attracted an average of 26,400 weekly pedestrian and bike visitors, versus 140,000 vehicles per week passing through when it had been open to motorized traffic.

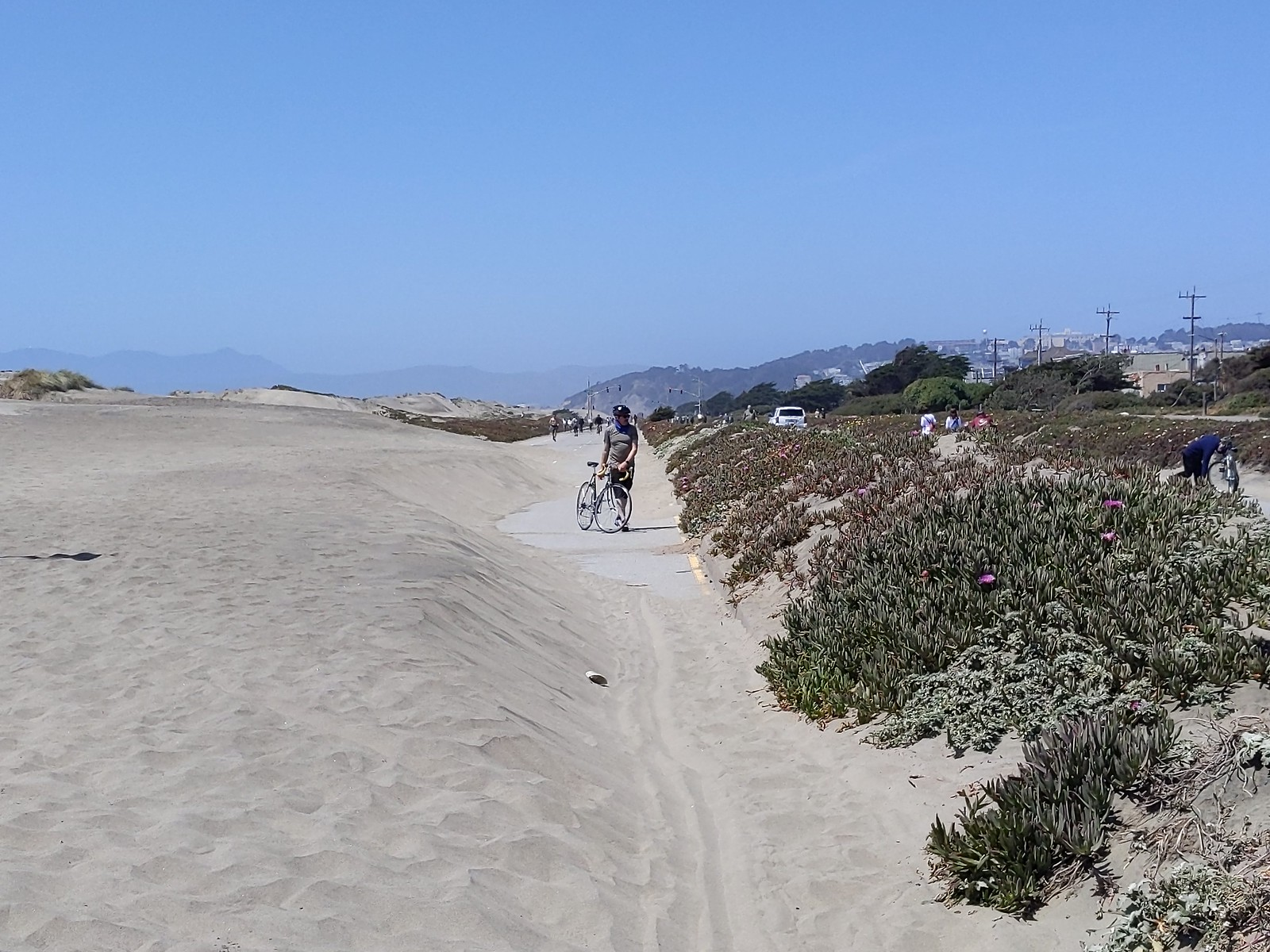
The Great Highway covered with sand in May 2021 during street closure

By 2021, the closure, along with the pedestrianization of JFK Drive in Golden Gate Park, had become hotly debated. One city survey of 4,000 San Francisco residents found 53% of respondents supported making the closure to motor vehicles permanent. A community created petition got over 11,000 signatures to reopen the highway to cars as of August 2021. That month, three westside San Francisco supervisors and Mayor London Breed announced the new plan to reopen the Great Highway to motor vehicle traffic on weekdays (except Friday afternoons). This announcement short-circuited a separate and ongoing planning process by the San Francisco County Transportation Authority to plan for the long-term future of the space, causing some protests. In 2022, The New York Times ranked the use of the road for walking and biking #18 out of "52 Places for a Changed World," chosen for ethical tourism features.

Prior to the motor vehicle closure, the roadway was closed an average of 27 times a year for sand removal and flooding. In April 2022, due to sand, the Great Highway was partially or completely closed to motor vehicles for the entire month.

In December 2022, after city voters rejected a ballot initiative that would have forced the Great Highway back open to motor vehicle traffic, the San Francisco Board of Supervisors voted 9–2 to renew the hybrid compromise until 2025. A group of neighbors called Friends of Great Highway Park praised the vote and continues to advocate for a fully car-free space.

In June 2024, five supervisors and Mayor London Breed placed Measure K on the November 2024 ballot, asking voters to approve turning a two-mile stretch (3.2 km) of the Great Highway into an oceanfront park. The measure was approved, and on March 14, 2025, the Upper Great Highway closed to private vehicle traffic permanently. The new park, Sunset Dunes, officially opened to the public on April 12, 2025.

=== Planned closure of southern extension ===
Due to rising sea levels the southernmost portion of the highway, Great Highway Extension from Sloat Boulevard to California State Route 35, is slated to close to vehicle traffic permanently starting in early 2026 as part of the Ocean Beach Climate Change Adaptation Project, to be replaced with a multi-use pathway, plaza, and seawall protections for city wastewater infrastructure. The new plaza, to be located at the intersection of Great Highway and Sloat, will feature a new restroom building, while the southern end of the closed section will feature a parking lot accessible from Skyline and a new staircase down to the beach.

== See also ==
- 49-Mile Scenic Drive
- Sunset Dunes Park
