= Mass media in the San Francisco Bay Area =

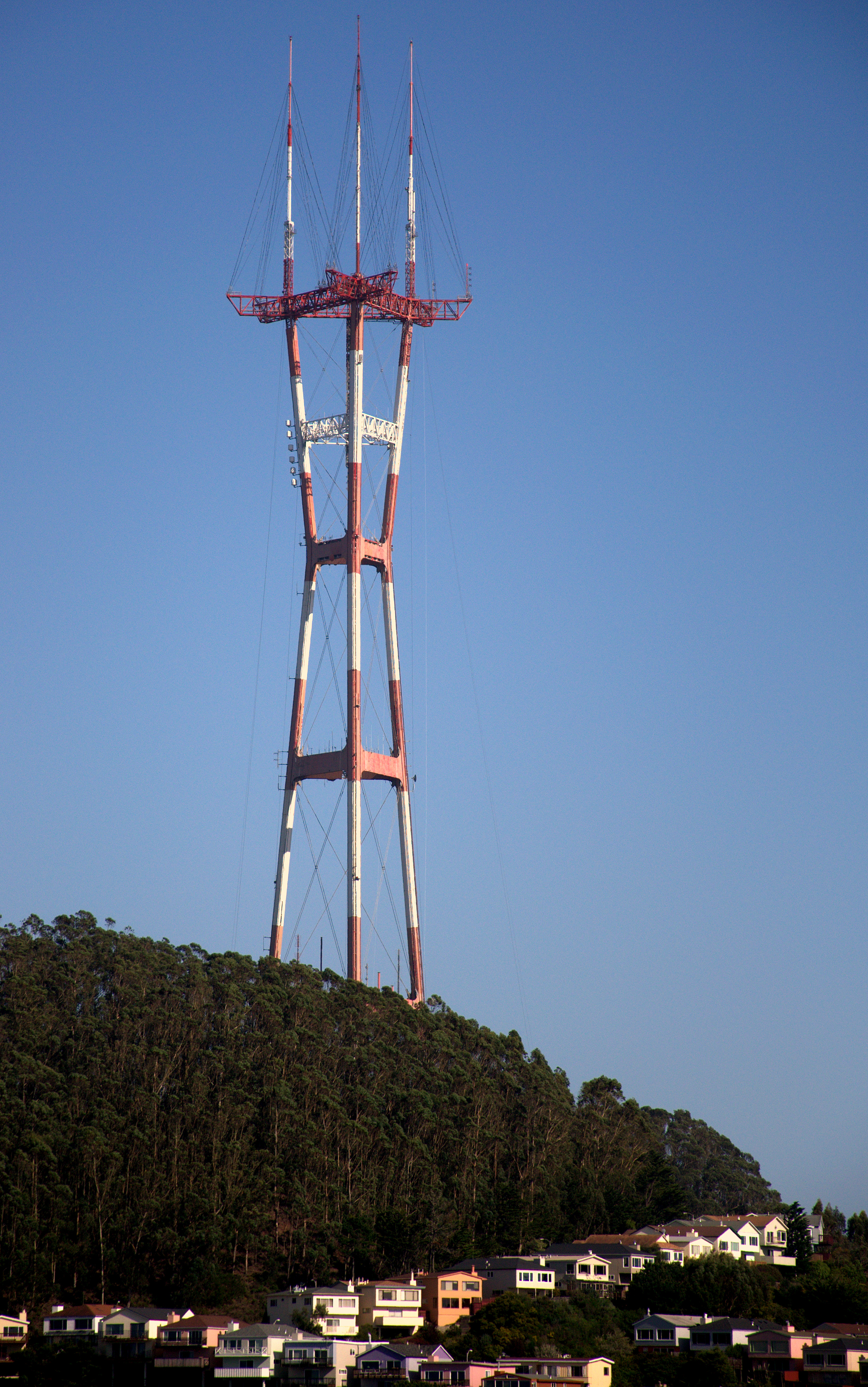
Sutro Tower, the landmark TV and radio antenna tower in San Francisco where some of the major Bay Area stations transmit from

The mass media in the San Francisco Bay Area has historically focused on San Francisco but also includes two other major media centers, Oakland and San Jose. The Federal Communications Commission, Nielsen Media Research, and other similar media organizations treat the San Francisco-Oakland-San Jose Area as one entire media market. The region hosts to one of the oldest radio stations in the United States still in existence, KCBS (AM) (740 kHz), founded by engineer Charles Herrold in 1909. As the home of Silicon Valley, the Bay Area is also a technologically advanced and innovative region, with many companies involved with Internet media or influential websites.

== Print ==
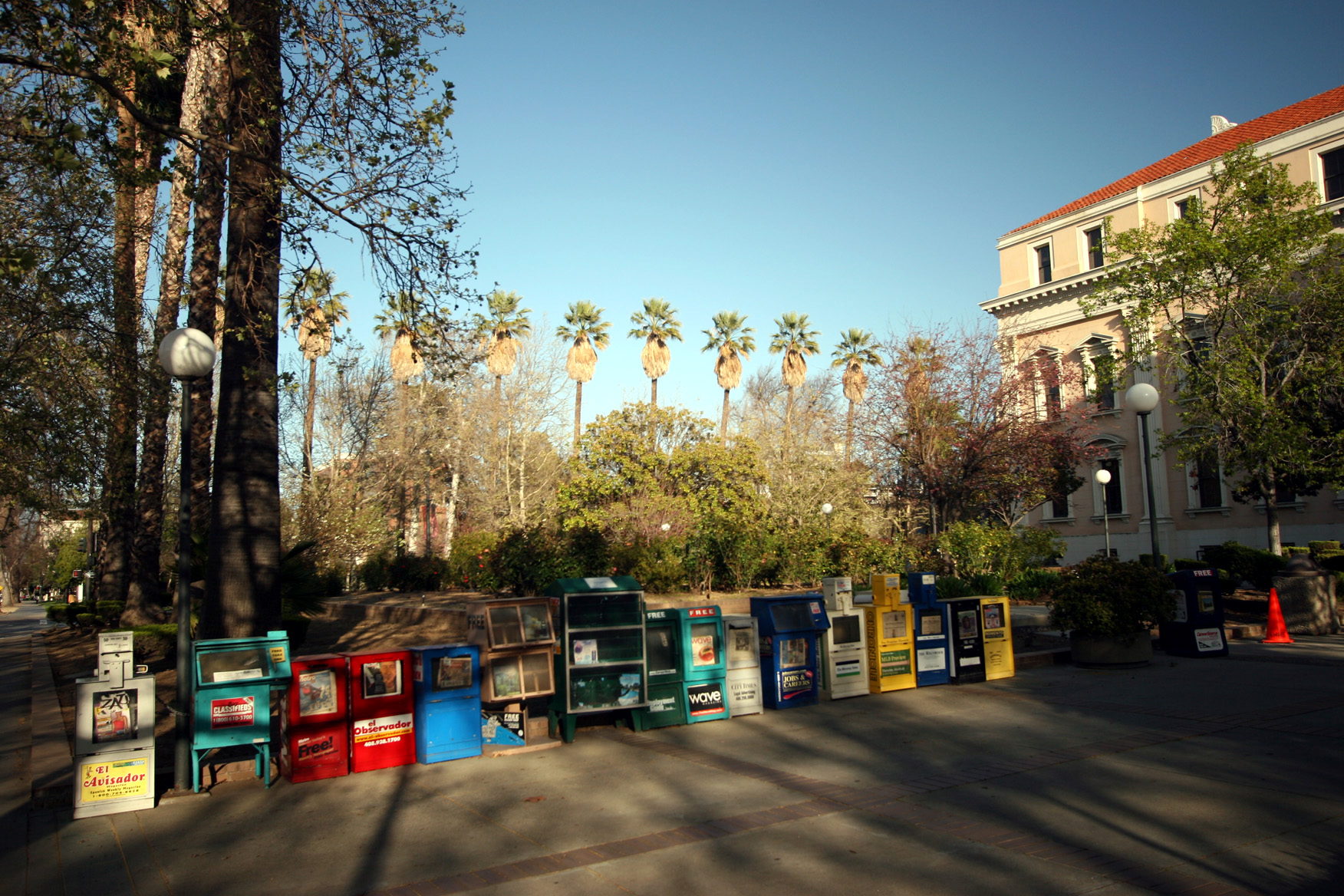
Newspaper vending machines in downtown San Jose

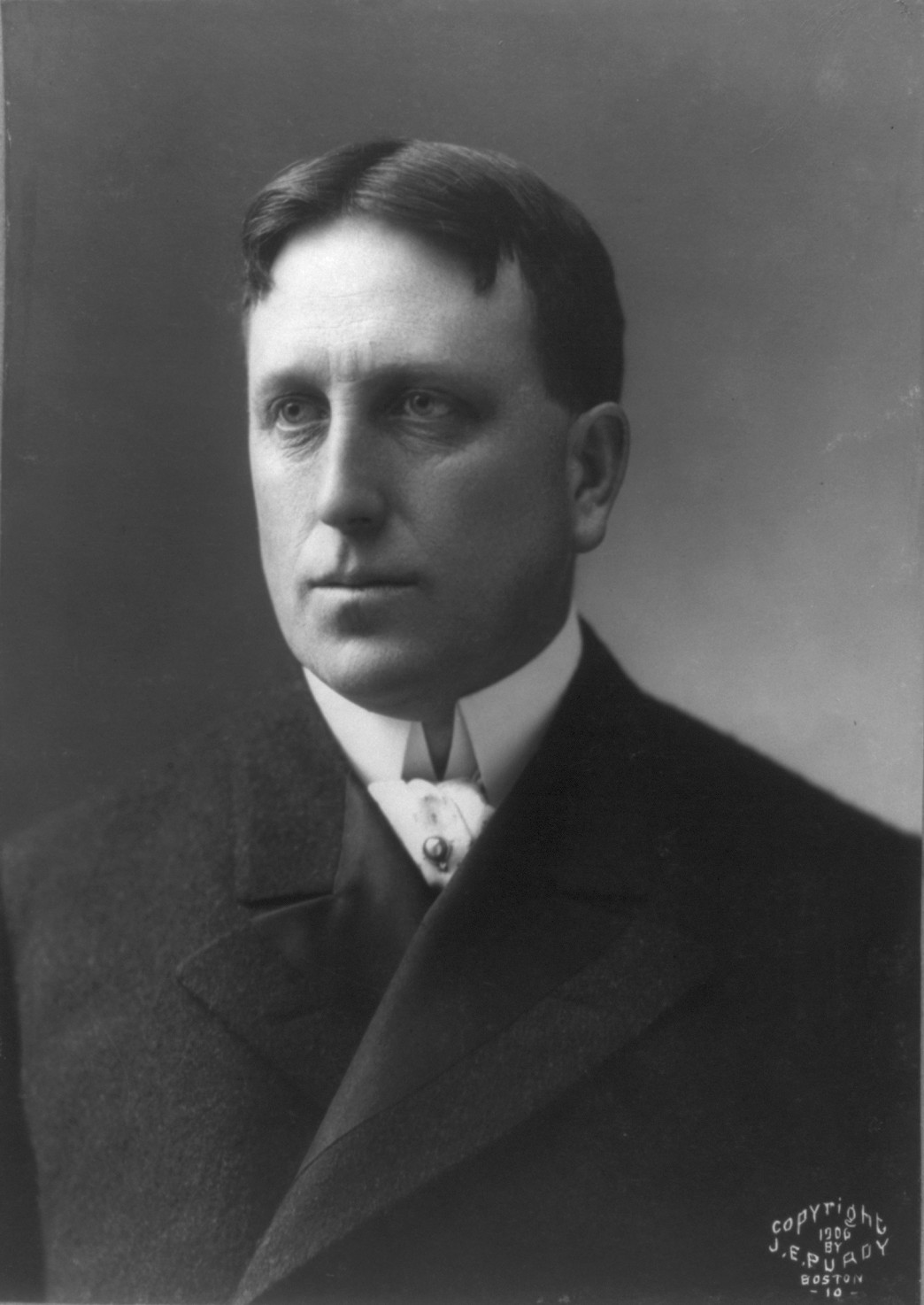
Newspaper publisher William Randolph Hearst, who took over the now-San Francisco Examiner in 1887 and later made it the flagship of his national chain

The first newspaper published by Americans in California was The Californian, printed in Monterey in 1846 announcing the Mexican–American War, written half in English and half Spanish. The press was moved to San Francisco and printing started up again on May 22, 1847, in competition with the weekly California Star, beginning that January. The first newspaper published solely in English in San Francisco, The Star was published by Mormon pioneer Sam Brannan before San Francisco was renamed from Yerba Buena in 1847. Both efforts suspended publication in the face of the California Gold Rush. By August, The Californian had resumed publication, but by November 1848, both papers were bought and merged, then renamed the Alta California.

The press that once printed The Californian was moved to the Sacramento area to be used on the Placer Times. The press was again moved and began publishing the Motherlode's first paper, the Sonora Herald, then taken to Columbia to print the Columbia Star. Within a few years of the discovery of gold, mother lode towns all had multiple competing journals. Before 1860, California had 57 newspapers and periodicals serving an average readership of 290,000.

James King of William began publishing the Daily Evening Bulletin in San Francisco in October 1855 and built it into the highest circulation paper in the city. He criticized a city supervisor named James P. Casey, who, on the afternoon of the story about him, ran in the paper, shot and mortally wounded King. Casey was lynched by the early vigilante committee. The Morning Call was established and began publishing in December 1856, and later merged with the Bulletin to become the long-running Call-Bulletin. The San Francisco Chronicle debuted in June 1865 as the Dramatic Chronicle, founded by Charles and M.H. de Young aged 19 and 17.

In 1887, young William Randolph Hearst took over his father's Daily Examiner, which became the flagship of his national chain.

Fremont Older became editor of the San Francisco Bulletin in 1895 and took up the struggle against the powerful Southern Pacific Railroad and along with fellow Californian Lincoln Steffens, became a well-known muckraker and the first objective observer to accuse District Attorney Charles Fickert of the framing of labor radical Thomas Mooney.

The oldest African-American newspaper, still active in the 1930s, was the California Eagle. It appeared first in Los Angeles in 1879. The first French journals, the Californien and the Gazette Republicane both began in 1850, and were followed by the Courrier du Pacifique in 1852. Both the first German and first Italian papers, the California Demokrat (1852) and the Voce del Popolo (1859) were founded in San Francisco and had long runs. Chinese in California have published many newspapers, the first being the Gold Hills News in 1854.

Noted journalists, writers, cartoonists and publishers have passed through San Francisco's media world, including:

- Herbert Asbury
- Gertrude Atherton
- Ambrose Bierce
- Winifred Bonfils
- John Bruce
- Bruce Brugmann
- Gelett Burgess
- Herb Caen
- William Martin Camp
- Phil Elwood
- C.H. Garrigues
- Henry George
- Harold Gilliam
- Rube Goldberg
- Bret Harte
- William Randolph Hearst
- Warren Hinckle
- Art Hoppe
- Wallace Irwin
- Will Irwin
- Harry Jupiter
- James King of William
- Jack London
- Charles McCabe
- Joaquin Miller
- Prentice Mulford
- Fremont Older
- Randy Shilts
- Charles Warren Stoddard
- Mark Twain
- John L. Wasserman

By the early decades of the 20th century, San Francisco supported four major dailies and numerous influential weeklies. The dailies were the San Francisco Call (later Call-Bulletin), the San Francisco Examiner, the San Francisco Chronicle and the Scripps-Howard-owned Daily News. The weeklies included the Wasp, the Argonaut, the Labor Clarion, the Coast Seamen's Journal, Emanu-el, Liberator and the News Letter.

Today, several newspapers, covering community, regional, national, and international news, and community-specific papers, catering to niche markets and individual neighborhoods, are in circulation in the San Francisco Bay Area. The major English-language newspapers include the daily East Bay Times, San Francisco Chronicle, San Francisco Examiner, and San Jose Mercury News. The weekly alternative papers are the Metro Silicon Valley, East Bay Express, and SF Weekly. The Epoch Times, Singtao Daily, World Journal, and Kangzhongguo are among the Asian newspapers that serve the Bay Area.

=== Newspapers ===
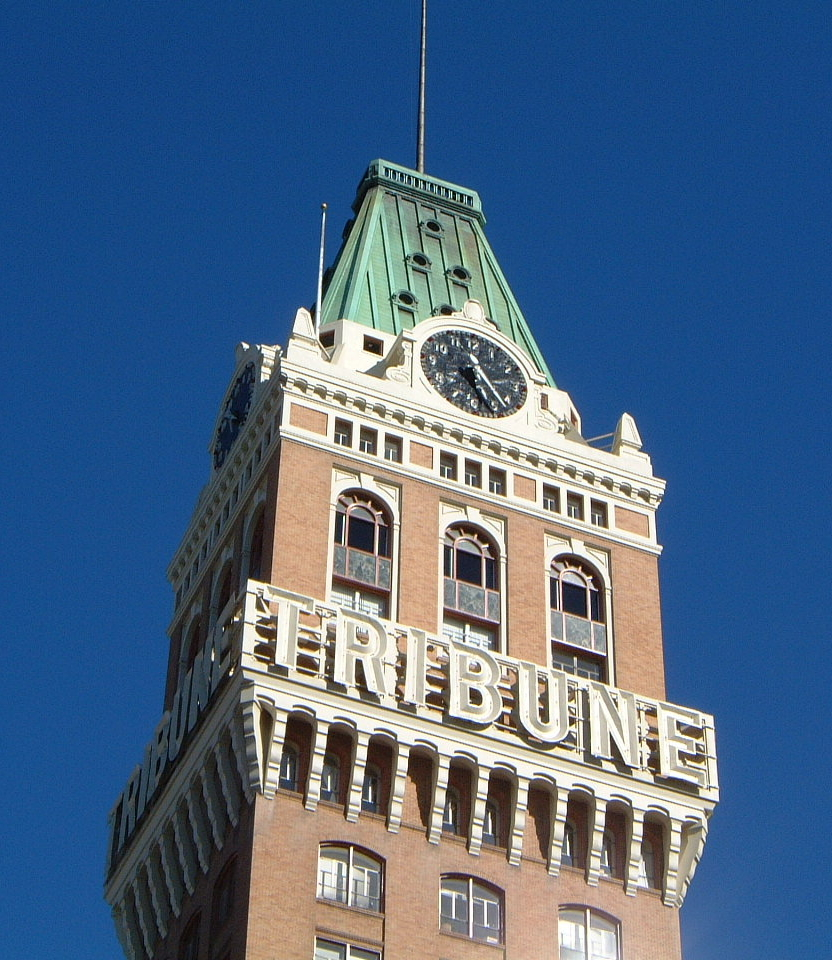
The Tribune Tower in Oakland, the headquarters of the Oakland Tribune from 1924 to 2007

- The Bay Area Reporter (San Francisco) – free weekly LGBT newspaper
- East Bay Times (Walnut Creek) – daily broadsheet
- The Daily News (Palo Alto) – weekly tabloid
- East Bay Express (Oakland) – weekly alternative
- Marin Independent Journal (Novato) – daily broadsheet
- The Epoch Times (California) – weekly broadsheet
- The Mercury News (San Jose) – daily broadsheet
- Metro Silicon Valley (San Jose) – weekly alternative
- El Observador (San Jose) – Spanish/English bilingual weekly
- Palo Alto Daily Post (Palo Alto) – daily tabloid
- Palo Alto Weekly (Palo Alto) – weekly tabloid
- The Recorder (San Francisco) – daily legal newspaper
- San Francisco Business Times (San Francisco) – weekly business
- San Francisco Chronicle (San Francisco) – daily broadsheet
- San Francisco Daily Journal (San Francisco) – daily legal newspaper
- The San Francisco Examiner (San Francisco) – daily tabloid
- Silicon Valley Business Journal (San Jose) – weekly business
- Alameda Sun (Alameda) – weekly tabloid
- Castro Valley Forum (Castro Valley) – weekly tabloid
- Several other community-based papers, published on a daily or weekly basis

Former newspapers

- Alameda Times-Star (Alameda)
- The Argus (Fremont) – daily broadsheet
- Contra Costa Times (Walnut Creek) – daily broadsheet
- Daily Review (Hayward) – daily broadsheet
- Oakland Tribune (Oakland) – daily broadsheet
- Peninsula Times Tribune (Palo Alto) – daily broadsheet
- Redwood City Daily News (Redwood City) – daily tabloid
- San Francisco Bay Guardian – weekly alternative
- San Francisco Progress – thrice-weekly broadsheet
- SF Weekly (San Francisco) – weekly walternative
- San Mateo County Times (San Mateo) – daily broadsheet

Ethnic newspapers

Aside from the major English broadsheets, the Bay Area also publishes newspapers catering to the large ethnic communities in the region, including:

- Calitoday (San Jose) – Vietnamese/English bilingual semiweekly
- The Epoch Times (San Francisco) – Chinese daily broadsheet
- Hromada (Corte Madera) - Ukrainian - It was co-created in 2017 by Lesya Castillo, who in 2022 served as the main editor.
- International Daily News (San Francisco) – Chinese daily broadsheet
- Kanzhongguo Times (Milpitas) – Chinese
- The Oakland Post (Oakland) – African American
- San Francisco Bay View (San Francisco) – African American
- Sing Tao Daily (Brisbane) – Chinese daily broadsheet
- Vietnam Daily News (San Jose) – Vietnamese daily
- Vision Hispana (Alameda) – Hispanic
- World Journal (San Francisco) – Chinese daily broadsheet
- Several other Asian and Hispanic newspapers

Former ethnic newspapers

- Cái Đình Làng (San Francisco) – Vietnamese
- Nuevo Mundo (San Jose) – Spanish weekly
- SaigonUSA (San Jose) – Vietnamese semiweekly
- Thái Bình (San Francisco) – Vietnamese
- Trống Đồng (San Jose) – Vietnamese weekly
- Viet Mercury (San Jose) – Vietnamese weekly
- East West The Chinese American Journal (San Francisco) – Chinese English weekly
- Việt Nam Tự Do (San Jose) – Vietnamese daily
- Viet Tribune (San Jose) – Vietnamese weekly
- Vietnam Family (Gia Đình, San Jose) – Vietnamese weekly
- Vietnam Mom (Mẹ Việt Nam, San Jose) – Vietnamese monthly
- Vietnam Times (Thời Báo, San Jose) – Vietnamese daily
- VTimes (San Jose) – Vietnamese

Several college newspapers also exist as well in the Bay Area, including:

- The Advocate (Contra Costa College) – weekly broadsheet
- The Campanil (Mills College)
- The Daily Californian (UC Berkeley) – daily broadsheet
- Golden Gate XPress (San Francisco State University)
- Pioneer (CSU Hayward) – weekly
- San Francisco Foghorn (University of San Francisco) – weekly tabloid
- The Santa Clara (Santa Clara University) – weekly tabloid
- Spartan Daily (San Jose State University) – thrice-weekly broadsheet
- The Stanford Daily (Stanford University) – daily broadsheet
- Synapse (UC San Francisco)

=== Magazines ===
- 7x7
- Afar
- Bay Nature
- The Believer
- Bob Cut Mag
- The Bold Italic
- Dwell
- Hyphen
- McSweeney's magazine and publishing house
- Macworld
- Mother Jones
- Salon
- San Francisco magazine
- SOMA
- Sunset
- The Valley Catholic
- Wired
- FourTwoNine

== Television ==
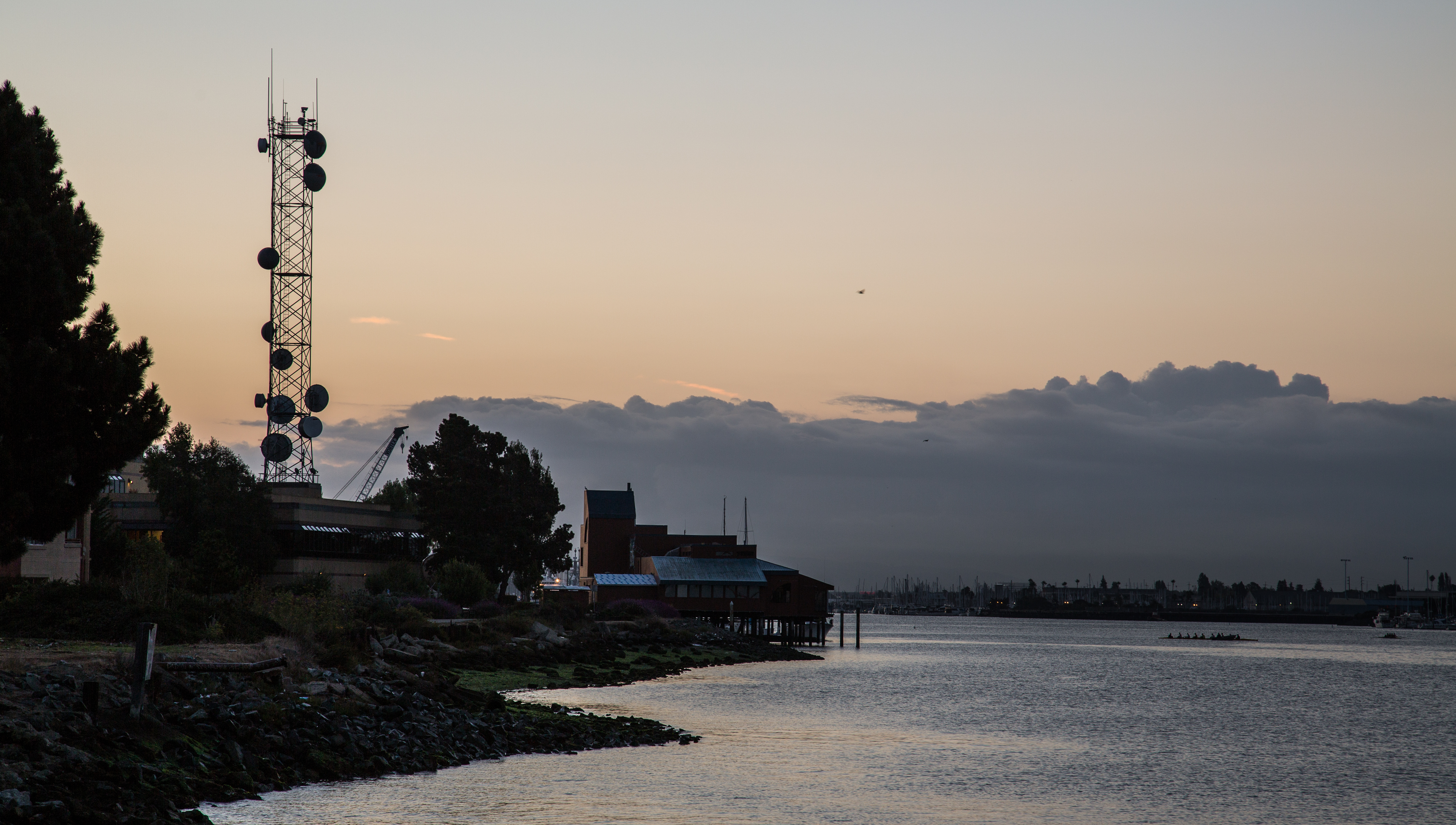
The KTVU/KICU-TV studios (left) overlooking the Oakland Estuary in Oakland's Jack London Square.

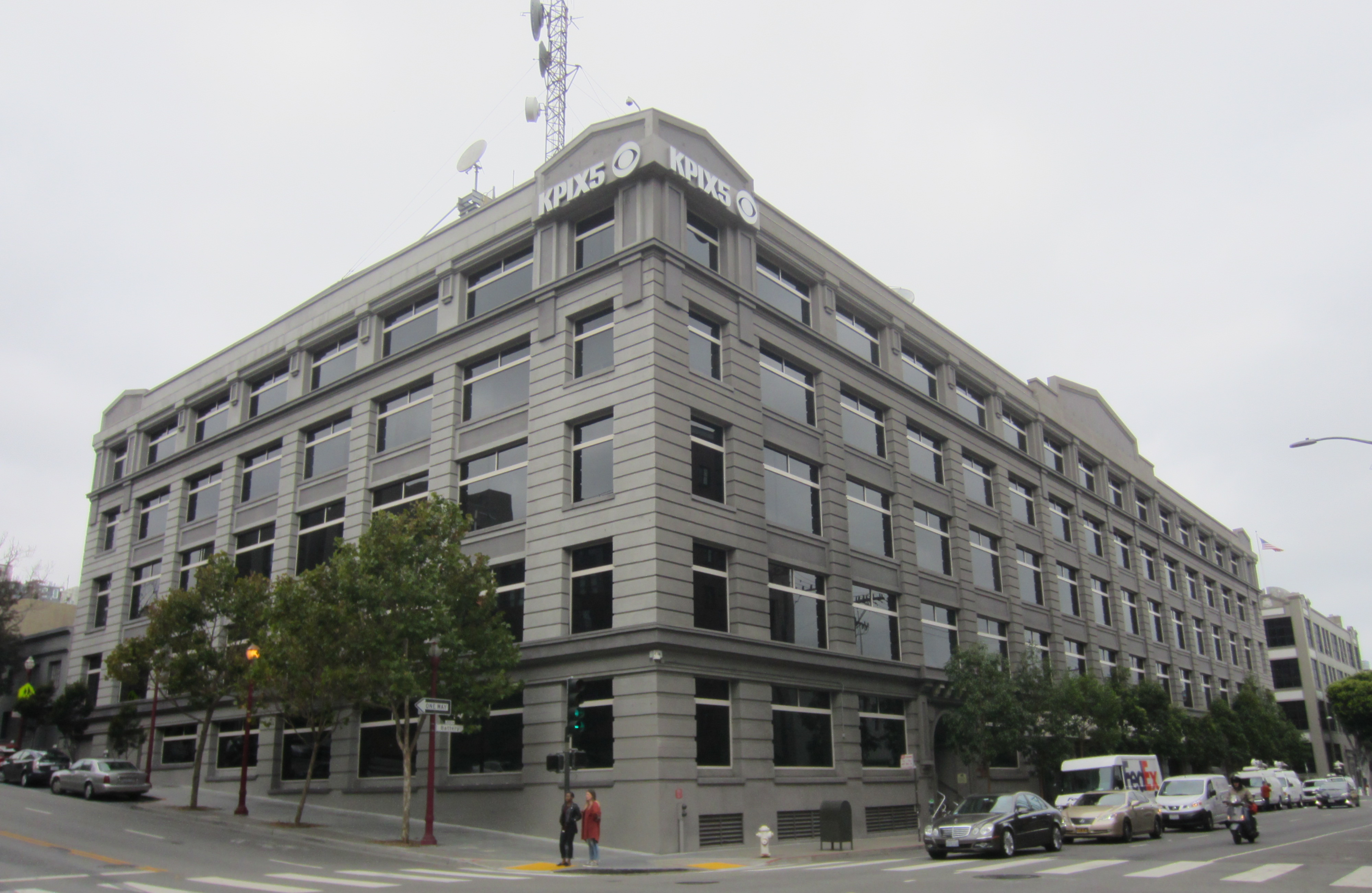
The KPIX-TV/KPYX studios, north of San Francisco's Financial District.

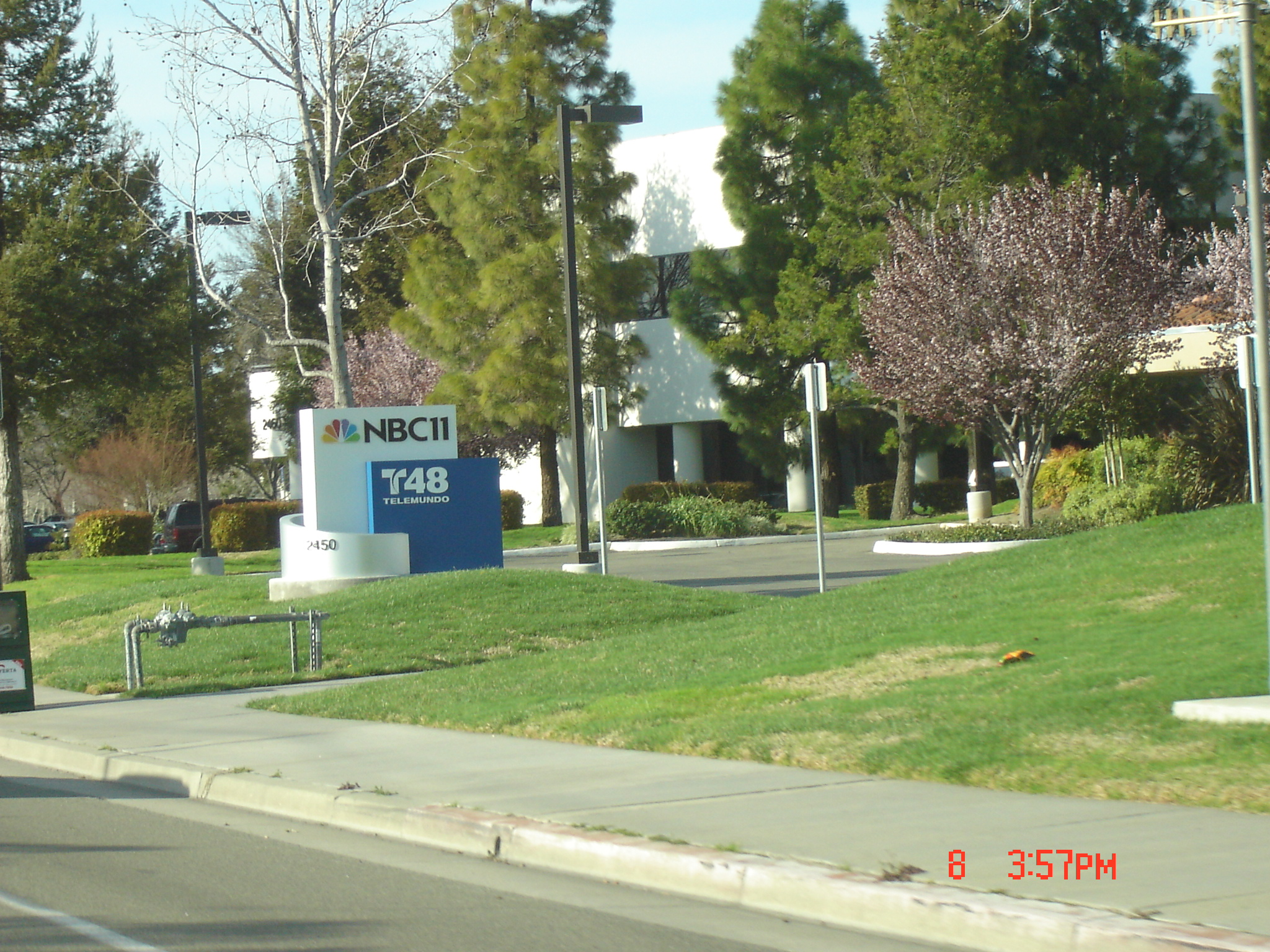
The KNTV/KSTS studios in San Jose's North San Jose Innovation District.

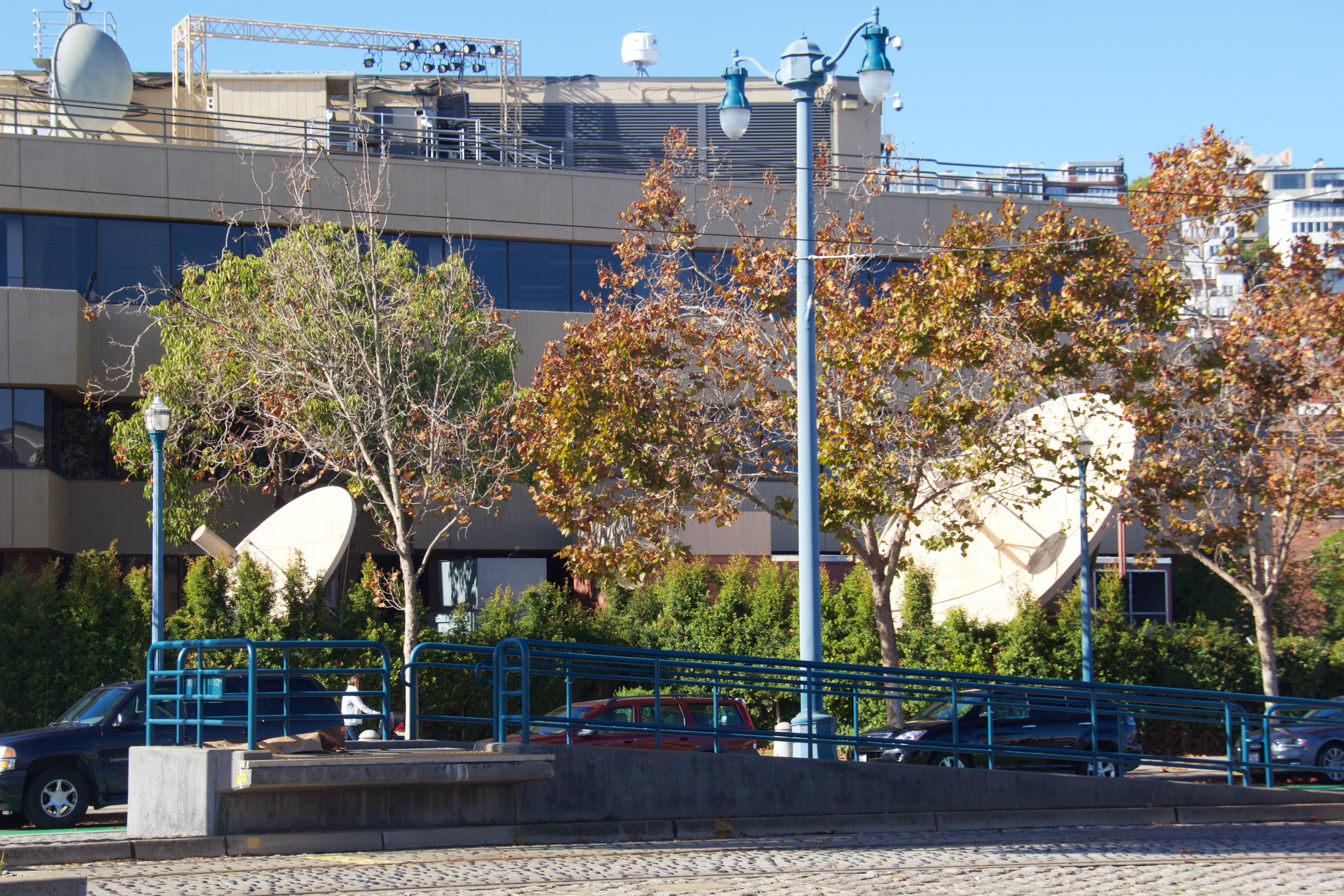
Antennas outside the KGO-TV studios, west of The Embarcadero; KRON-TV is housed in the same building.

The San Francisco Bay Area is currently the tenth-largest television market in the United States, with five of the six major U.S. television networks (ABC, CBS, The CW, NBC, and Fox) having owned-and-operated stations serving the region. All six, plus major Spanish-language networks Telemundo, Univision, and UniMás, also own and operate stations that serve the San Francisco market. KPIX, Channel 5, was San Francisco's first television station when it signed on the air on December 22, 1948; it was also the first commercial television station in northern California.

Television stations whose terrestrial broadcast signals can be received in the San Francisco Bay Area include:

=== Full-power ===
- 2 KTVU Oakland (Fox)**
- 4 KRON San Francisco (The CW)**
- 5 KPIX San Francisco (CBS)**
- 7 KGO-TV San Francisco (ABC)**
- 8 KQSL Cloverdale (Total Living Network)
- 9 KQED San Francisco (PBS)
- 11 KNTV San Jose (NBC)**
- 14 KDTV-DT San Francisco (Univision)**
- 20 KOFY-TV San Francisco (Estrella TV)
- 22 KRCB Cotati (PBS)
- 26 KTSF San Francisco (Multicultural independent)
- 32 KMTP-TV San Francisco (Non-commercial independent)
- 36 KICU-TV San Jose (Independent with MyNetworkTV)
- 38 KCNS San Francisco (Shop LC)
- 42 KTNC-TV Concord (TCT)**
- 44 KPYX San Francisco (Independent)
- 48 KSTS San Jose (Telemundo)**
- 50 KEMO-TV Fremont
- 54 KQEH San Francisco (PBS)
- 60 KPJK San Mateo (Non-commercial independent)
- 65 KKPX-TV San Jose (Ion Television)**
- 66 KFSF-DT Vallejo (UniMás)**
- 68 KTLN-TV Palo Alto (Heroes & Icons)**

=== Low-power ===
- 1 KAXT-CD San Francisco (Catchy Comedy)**
- 3 KURK-LD San Francisco (theDove TV)
- 6 KBKF-LD San Jose (Jewelry TV)
- 12 KPJC-LD San Francisco
- 15 KQTA-LD San Francisco
- 15 KFMY-LD Petaluma
- 15 KZHD-LD Rohnert Park
- 16 KSCZ-LD San Jose
- 17 KQSL-LD San Rafael (theDove TV)
- 18 KMPX-LD Petaluma (Jewelry TV)
- 24 KMMC-LD San Francisco
- 27 KUKR-LD Santa Rosa (theDove TV)
- 28 KCNZ-CD San Francisco
- 28 KDTV-CD Santa Rosa (Univision)**
- 45 KQRO-LD Morgan Hill
- 52 KDTS-LD San Francisco (Daystar)**
- 52 KDAS-LD Santa Rosa (Daystar)**

=== Defunct ===
- KCFT-TV Concord (1966)
- KEXT-CD San Jose (1994–2017)
- KSAN-TV / KNEW-TV / KQEC San Francisco (1954–1972, 1977–1979, 1980–1988)
- KUDO / KVOF-TV San Francisco (1968–1985)

=== Cable and streaming ===
- CBS News Bay Area
- Comcast Hometown Network
- CreaTV San Jose
- NBC Sports Bay Area & California; NBC Sports Bay Area broadcasts the San Francisco Giants and Golden State Warriors, with NBC Sports California carrying the A's, San Jose Sharks and Sacramento Kings
- NBC Sports California

In addition to local television channels, several television networks have regional news bureaus in the San Francisco Bay Area, including BBC, CNN, ESPN, MSNBC, Al Jazeera America, Russia Today, CCTV America, and PBS. Regional sports networks NBC Sports Bay Area and NBC Sports California both originate from the studios of NBC-Telemundo duopoly KNTV-KSTS.

== Radio ==
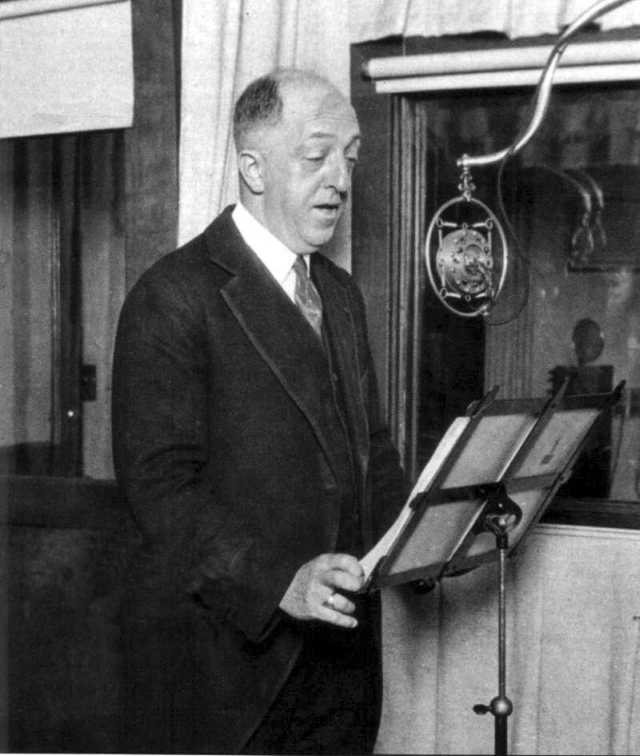
Charles Herrold, founder of KCBS-AM

The San Francisco Bay Area is currently the fourth-largest radio market in the United States, with all of the major U.S. radio networks having affiliates serving the region. While most radio stations targeting the Bay Area originate in San Francisco, it also includes stations broadcasting from San Jose, mostly to South Bay listeners and other parts of the Bay Area depending on reception. The San Jose radio market ranks as the 37th largest, but is considered an embedded market within the Bay Area.

Radio broadcasting in the region can be traced back to the efforts of Charles Herrold and Lee de Forest as early as 1907. In April 1909, Herrold, an electronics instructor in San Jose, constructed a radio station to broadcast the human voice. The station, "San Jose Calling" (call letters FN, later FQW), was the world's first radio station with scheduled programming targeted at a general audience. The station became the first to broadcast music in 1910. Herrold's wife Sybil became the first female "disk jockey" in 1912. The station changed hands a number of times before becoming today's KCBS in San Francisco in 1949.

== Online ==
=== Online publications ===
Besides websites that exist in addition to print publications, many publications that only exist online have come into existence in recent years. The most notable include:

- Mission Local
- Berkeleyside
- The San Francisco Standard
- Asian Week
- Eater SF
- Curbed SF
- San José Spotlight
- SF Public Press
- SFist
- The Tender
- AJ+, part of Al Jazeera Media Network

=== Internet and social media ===
As the home of Silicon Valley, several high technology companies involved with Internet media or social media are either headquartered or have a significant presence in the Bay Area. These include the following:

- Facebook
- Google
- Netflix
- Pandora Radio
- Twitter
- Yahoo!
- YouTube
Headquarters of Internet and social media companies in the Bay Area

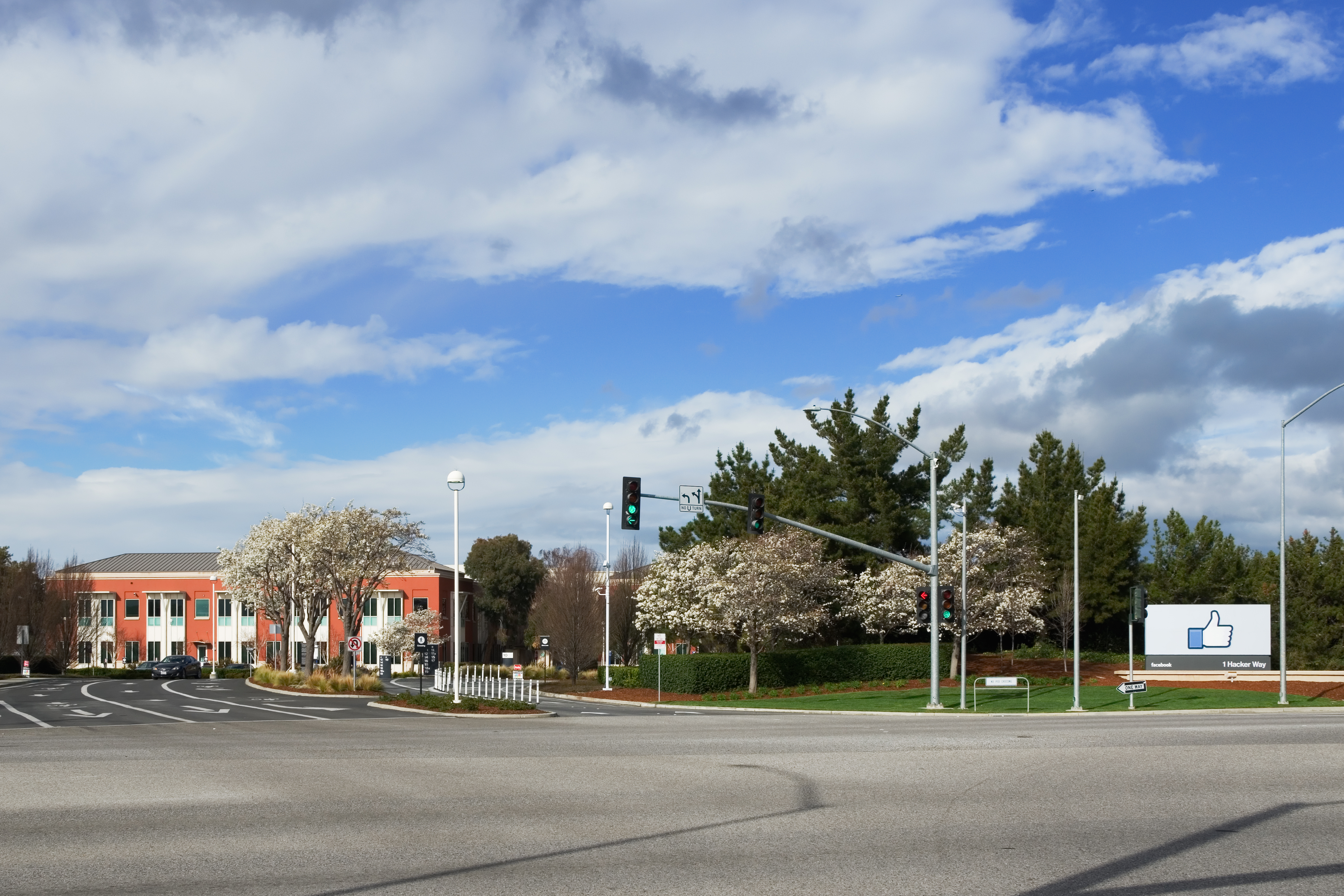
Facebook

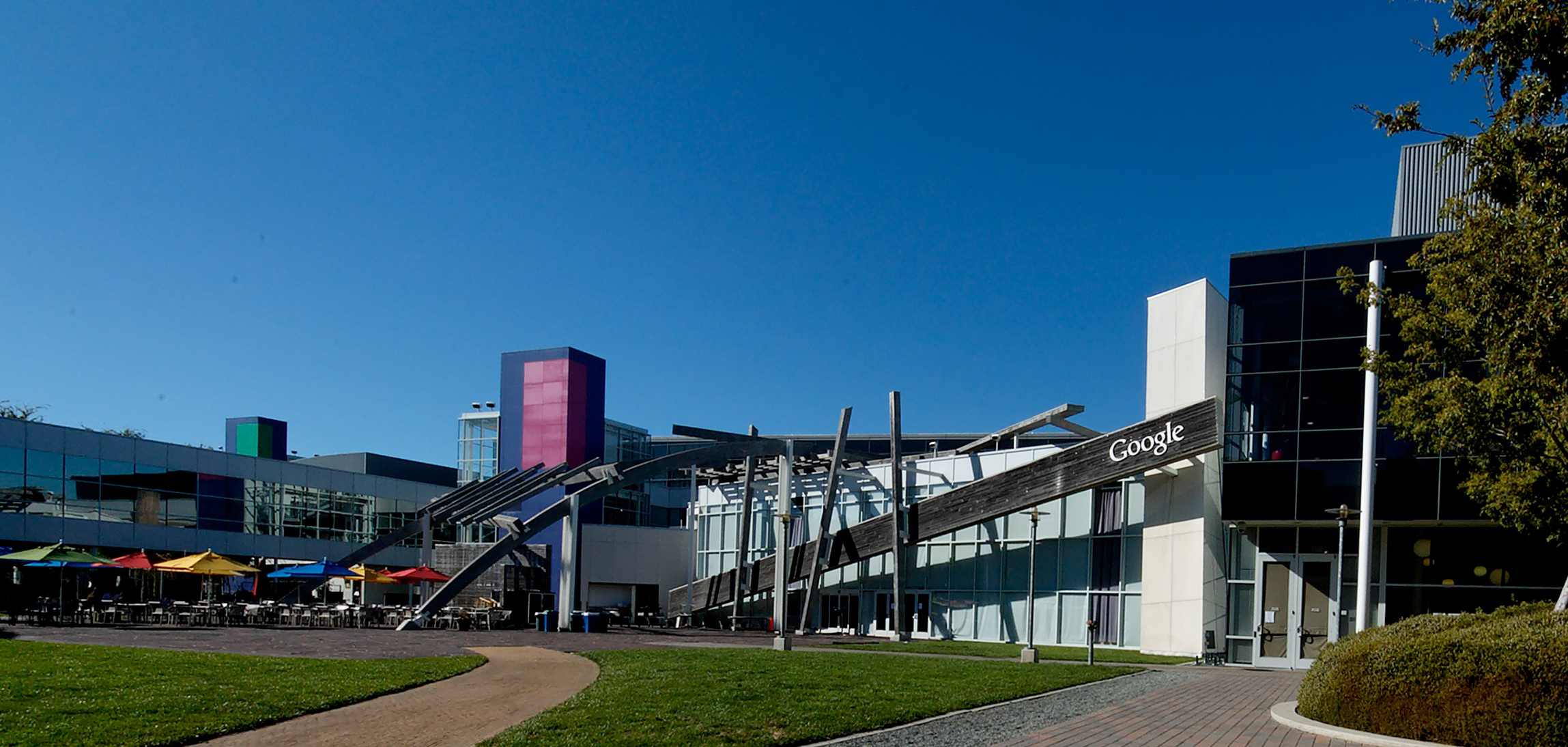
Google

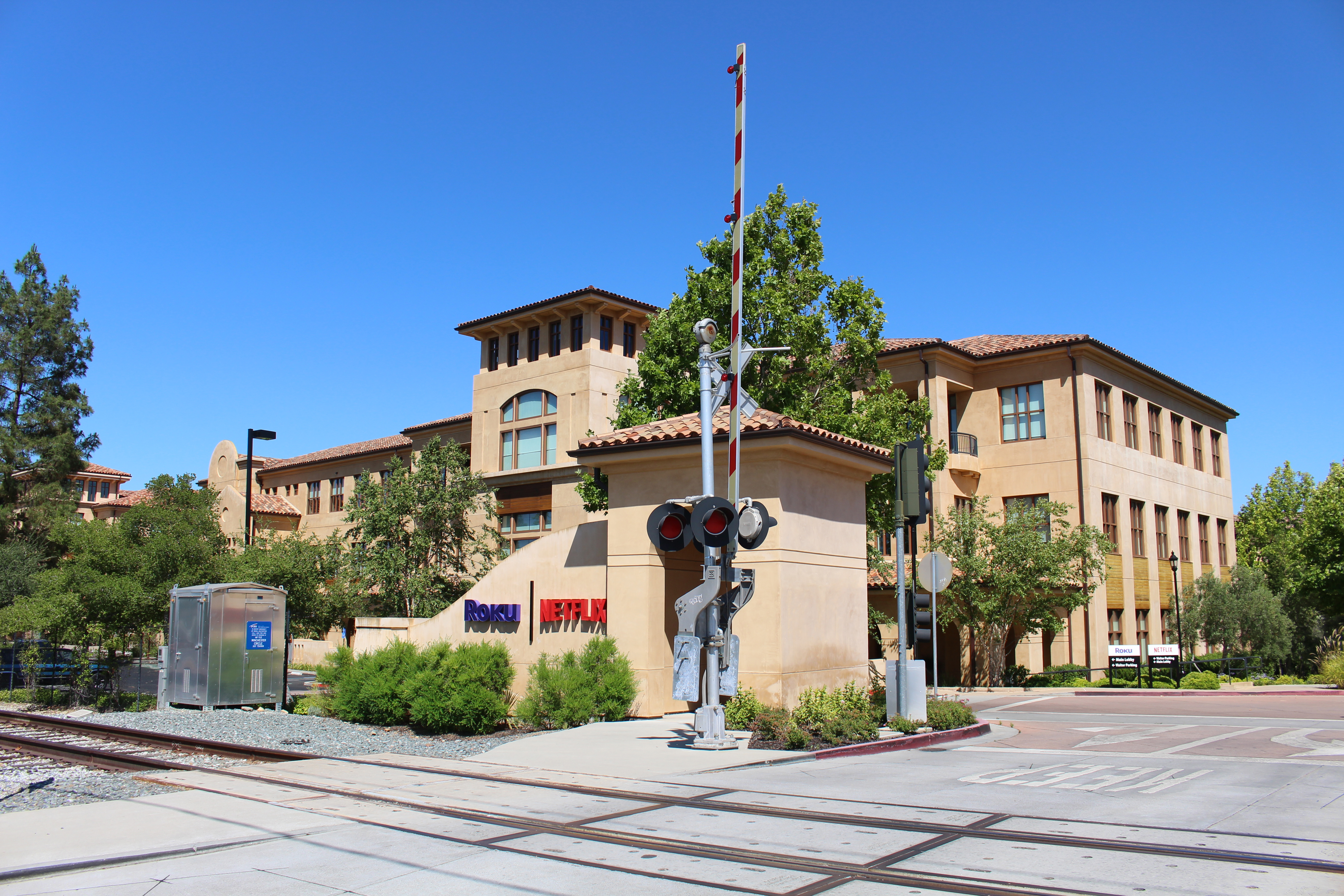
Netflix

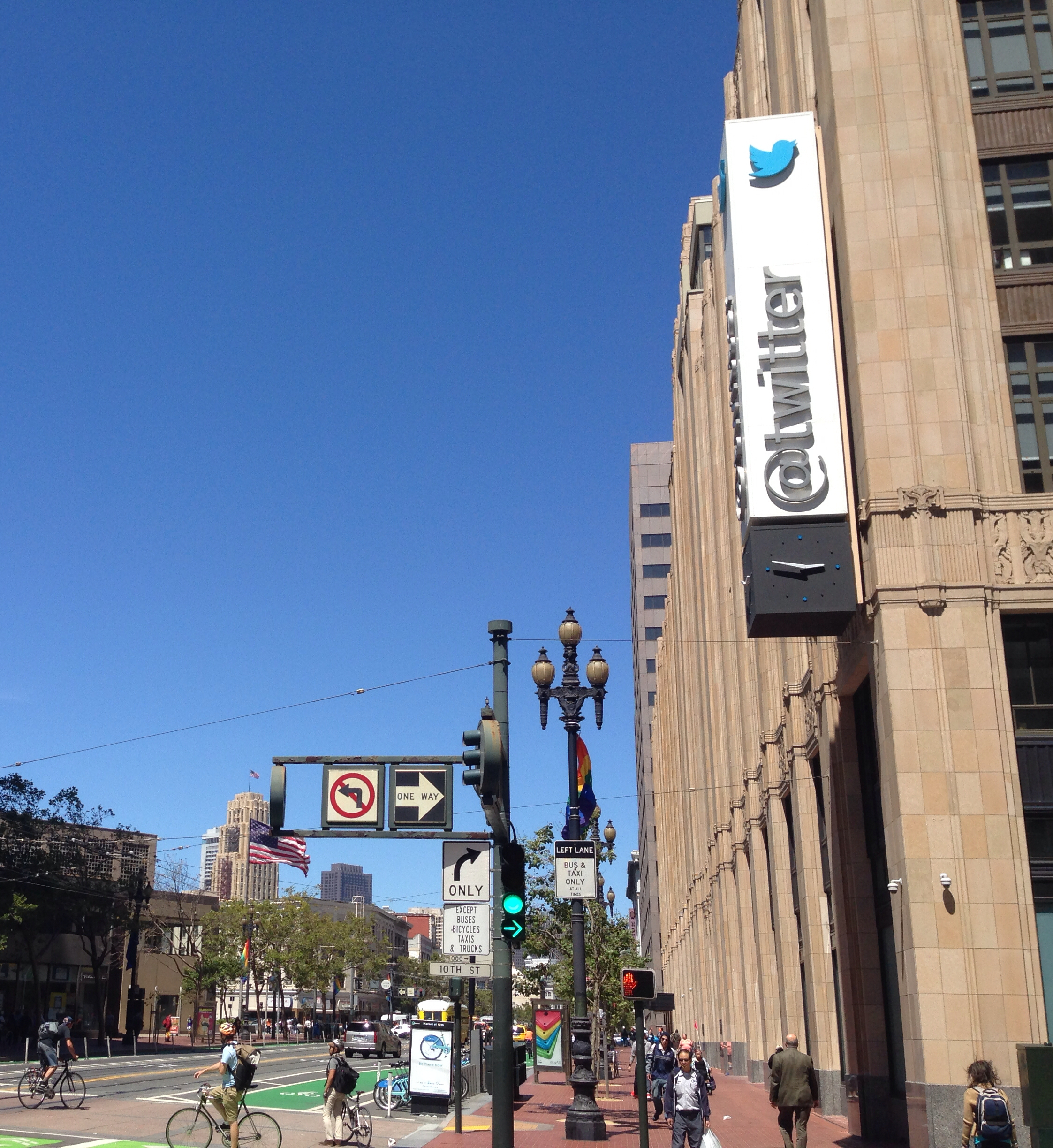
Twitter

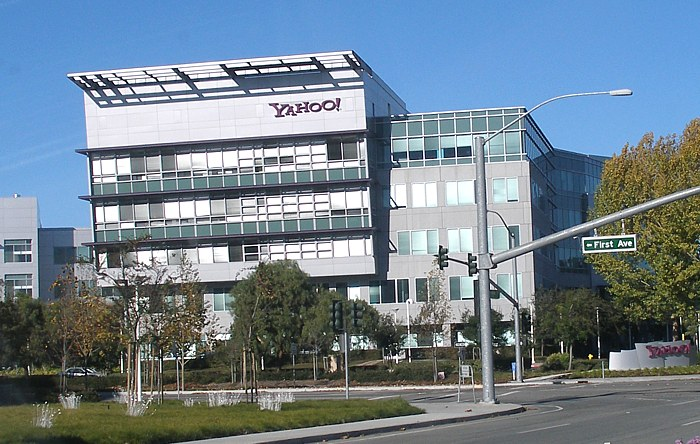
Yahoo!

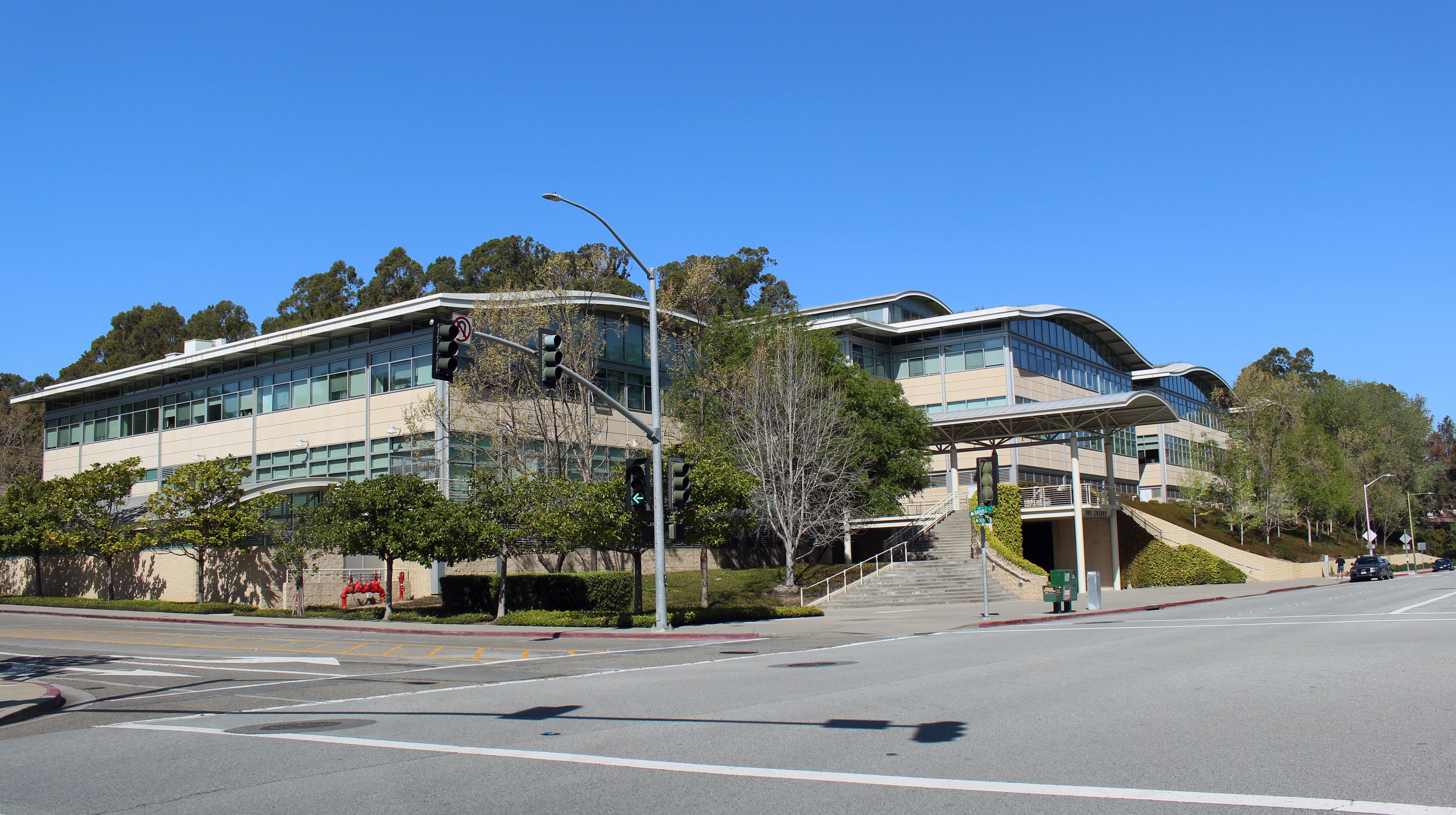
YouTube

== See also ==
- Center for Media Justice
