= Voices of Monterey Bay =

Nonprofit news website

- Founded: 2017
- Founder: Julia Reynolds, Mary Duan and Joe Livernois
- Location: Monterey County, California
- Website: www.voicesofmontereybay.org

Voices of Monterey Bay is a nonprofit news organization. Founded in 2017 in response to the decline of The Salinas Californian, the site provides bilingual coverage in English and Spanish. They launched with coaching and financial matching from the Institute for Nonprofit News. Founders include Julia Reynolds, Mary Duan and Joe Livernois. The site started out with a focus more on investigative and longer-form pieces than topical news stories.

In 2018 and 2019, the site was amplifying the voices of children of farmworkers and people in prison whose stories are underrepresented in the media landscape, in part through summer workshops developing skills for writing stories. The site won awards at the 2023 Society for Professional Journalists Northern California.

== See also ==
- Lookout Santa Cruz
- Mission Local
- San José Spotlight
- Voice of San Diego
