= Lincoln Way (San Francisco) =

Thoroughfare in San Francisco, United States

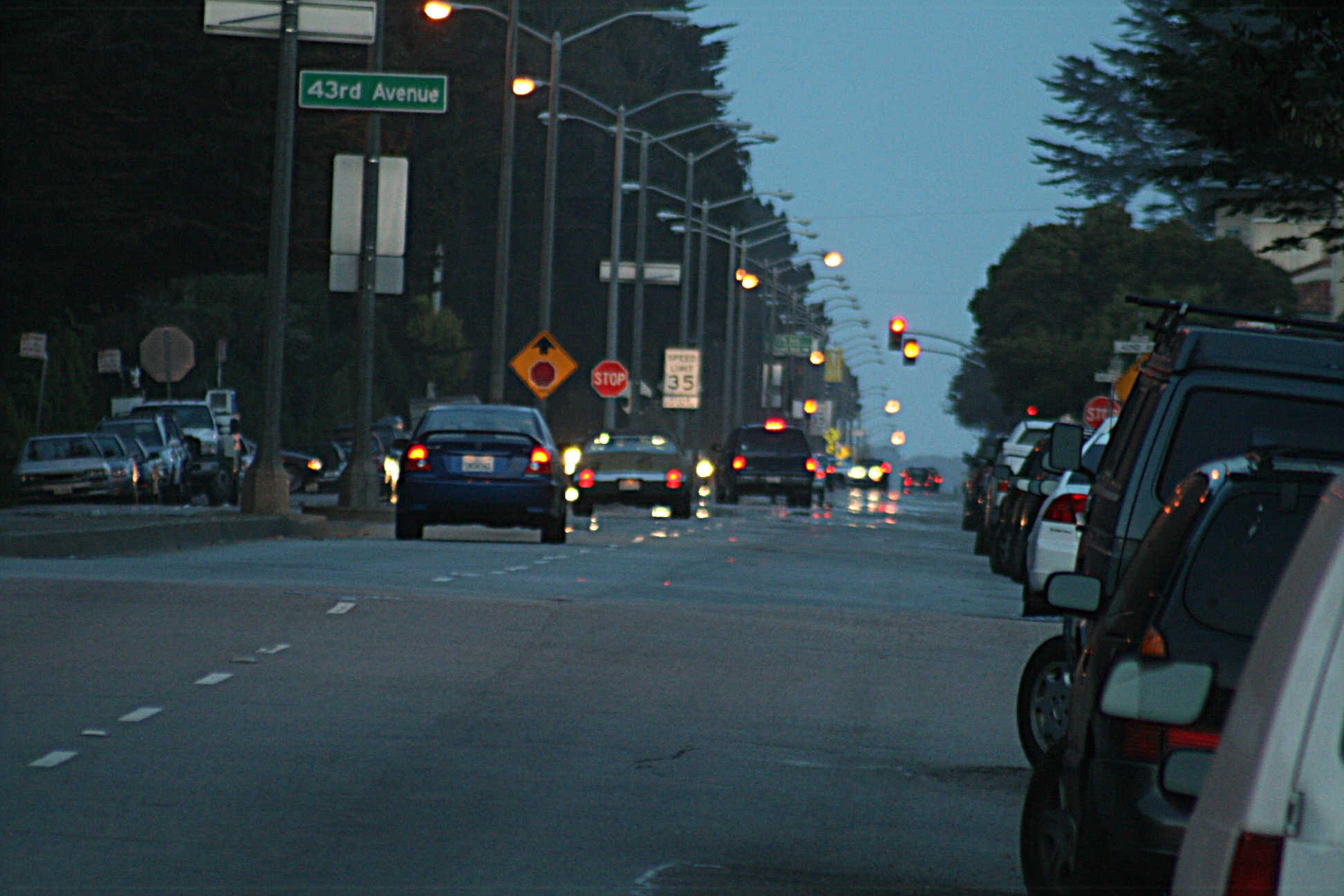
- Intersection of 43rd Avenue and Lincoln Way
- Namesake: Abraham Lincoln
- Length: 2.9 mi (4.7 km)
- Location: San Francisco, California
- West end: Great Highway
- Major junctions: SR 1
- East end: Arguello Boulevard

Lincoln Way is a major east–west thoroughfare located on the West Side of San Francisco, California. For most of its length, it has two car lanes in each direction, separated by a median.

The street's eastern end starts at Arguello Boulevard and runs westbound through the Sunset District to the Great Highway at Ocean Beach.

Lincoln Way runs along and defines the entire southern side of Golden Gate Park.

== Route description ==
Lincoln Way starts at the Great Highway near the western coast of San Francisco. It then intersects with several major streets, including Martin Luther King Junior Drive, California State Route 1 (19th Avenue/Crossover Drive), and Kezar Drive. It crosses over Sunset Boulevard without an interchange. It then terminates at Arguello Boulevard, becoming Frederick Street.

== History ==
Lincoln Way was originally called H Street before 1909. In 1917, there was a railroad running through the road's median. H Street and the railroad were the first routes to the Outer Sunset area. These were later removed.
