= CreaTV San Jose =

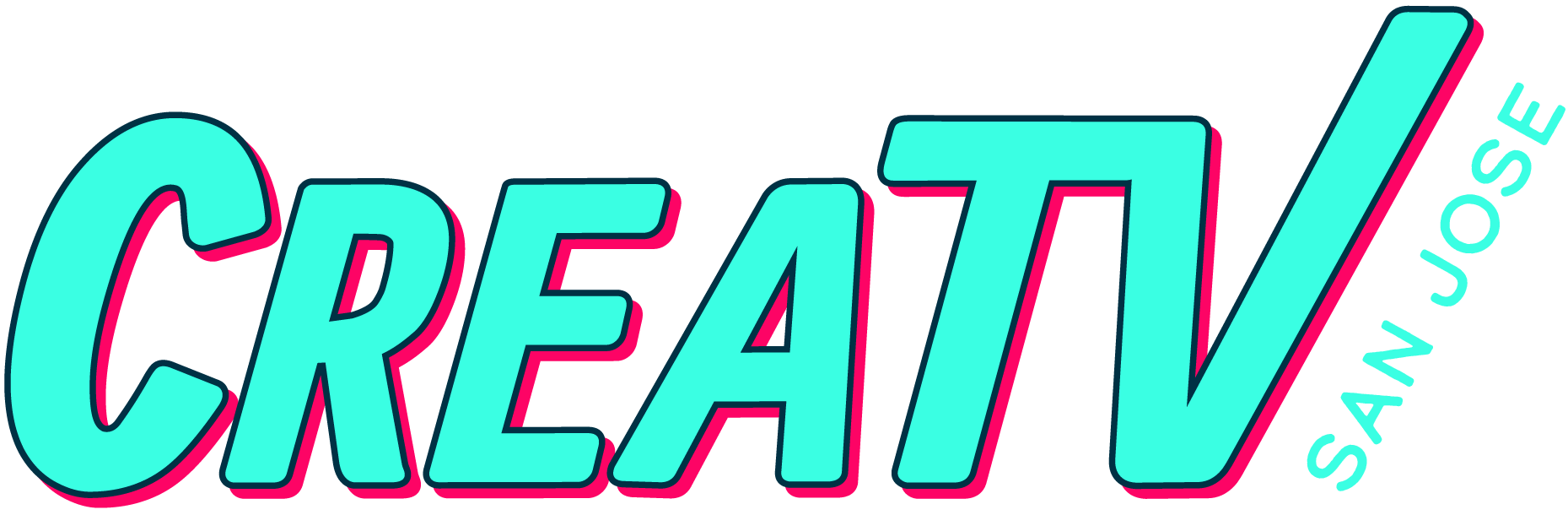
- Formation: June 22, 2008
- Type: Nonprofit organization
- Headquarters: 38 South Second Street; San Jose, California 95113
- Coordinates: 37°20′9″N 121°53′19″W
- Services: Public-access television
- Chief executive officer: Chad A. Johnston (2016–present)
- Staff: 23
- Website: www.creatvsj.org

CreaTV San Jose (abbreviated CRTV) is a nonprofit organization based in San Jose, California, United States, that broadcasts several public-access television channels in San Jose and the surrounding Silicon Valley area. Under federal law, CreaTV receives a share of the gross revenue of local cable franchisees Comcast and AT&T, which amounted to $1.2 million in 2009.

== History ==
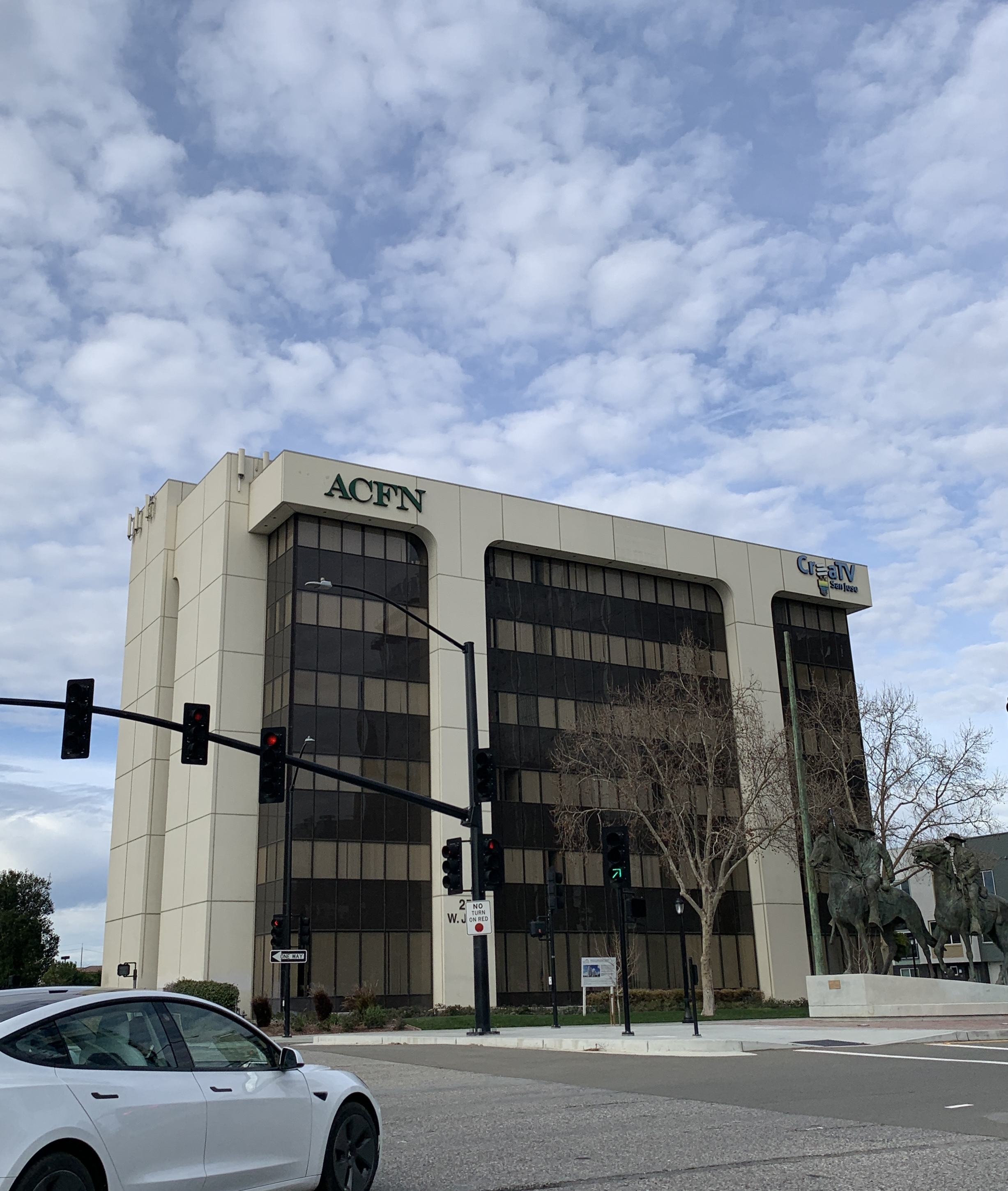
CreaTV's former studios on West Julian Street.

CreaTV was founded on June 22, 2008, to take over San Jose community television from Comcast Cable, which for at least 15 years had made their 2nd Street studio available for public access. CreaTV went on the air on July 1, 2008, nine days after its founding. CreaTV was originally located at the Davidson Building on West Julian Street. In 2023, CreaTV opened Open San José, an 18,000-square-foot (1,700 m^{2}) community center on South Second Street, to serve as the organization's offices and that of several other local nonprofit media and art organizations, including Chopsticks Alley Art, Mosaic America, WORKS San José, LEAD Filipino, San José Spotlight, and Northern California Public Media.

== Programming ==
CreaTV operates four public-access and educational television channels for the City of San Jose. Three of the channels are available on Xfinity systems in San Jose and Campbell:

- CRTV 15 The Outlet (formerly the Community Channel)
- CRTV 28 Classrooms Channel
- CRTV 30 Silicon Valley Channel

CRTV 27 Bay Voice Channel is available in 15 cities in Santa Clara and San Mateo counties. It is coproduced with KMVT 15 in Mountain View and the Midpeninsula Community Media Center in Palo Alto.
