= Lookout Santa Cruz =

Digital newspaper in Santa Cruz, California

- Type: Digital newspaper
- Founder: Ken Doctor
- Opinion editor: Jody K. Biehl
- Founded: 20 November 2020; 5 years ago
- Language: English
- City: Santa Cruz, California
- Website: lookout.co

Lookout Santa Cruz is a digital newspaper launched in November 2020 based in Santa Cruz, California. It was created by Ken Doctor, a media analyst who had studied the decline of local newspapers in the United States. Its parent company is Lookout Local. Lookout Santa Cruz receives philanthropic support, advertising revenue, and online subscription revenue. Lookout won a Pulitzer Prize for Breaking News Reporting in 2024 for its coverage of the 2022–2023 California floods.

== History and operations ==
Lookout Santa Cruz launched in October 2020 with about $2.5 million raised from philanthropy from organizations including the Knight Foundation, the Google News Innovation Challenge, and the Silicon Valley Community Foundation.

During its first year, it suffered from high turnover. Its three top editors and chief revenue officer left to work in other cities, and in February 2023, only two original staff members remained from the organization's October 2020 start. In April 2022, Doctor wrote that Lookout had a team of 13 people, ten in the newsroom and three in business. Most employees are paid $65,000 to $70,000 per year. The editorial staff at Lookout outnumbers that of the Santa Cruz Sentinel, which had seven in early 2023, a decline from the 40 newsroom employees it had in the early 2000s.

Ken Doctor, the newspaper's founder, frequently writes about the operations of Lookout Santa Cruz in his column for Nieman Journalism Lab. In early 2023, Doctor said the company was on track to make a profit in 2023 and had 8500 paid subscribers. Doctor attended University of California, Santa Cruz in the 1970s, and after a career in journalism that included an alternative weekly paper in Oregon and the defunct Knight Ridder media company, he returned to Santa Cruz in the early 2010s.

Lookout Santa Cruz won the 2024 Pulitzer Prize for Breaking News Reporting for its community-focused coverage of the 2022–2023 California floods that destroyed more than 1,000 homes and businesses.

== See also ==
- Institute for Nonprofit News
- Nonprofit journalism
- Voices of Monterey Bay
