= Local Independent Online News Publishers =

Local Independent Online News Publishers (LION) was founded in 2012 to support mostly smaller, hyperlocal media outlets, 90% of which publish online. 2/3 are for-profit newsrooms and 1/3 are nonprofit. LION focuses on helping these outlets have a more sustainable operation by focusing on the business aspects of a media company. Some media startups have business expertise but lack journalism skills, while the outlets with journalism expertise are hoping to get business tips through LION like on finding insurance or using certain digital tools. The annual conference has been its main event every year since its founding after the 2011 Block by Block Community News Summit.

If members pass an audit, they are eligible for funding that has been given by groups including Knight Foundation and Google News Initiative. As of 2023, the organization was almost entirely funded by philanthropy, including from sources like Meta and Google. They also collaborate closely with the Institute for Nonprofit News and share a number of members.

In 2017, an American Press Institute report recommended LION’s member directory as one place to start to look for potential partners. In 2017, LION had 160 news publishers in 39 states and grew significantly during the pandemic.

In 2022, LION lobbied against the failed Journalism Competition and Preservation Act in Congress, stating that it feared that most of the money from platforms like Meta and Google would benefit larger publishers, though Emily Bell writing for the Tow Center raised concerns about the influence of the funding LION receives from those major platforms.

In 2024, LION was awarded a board seat on a yet-to-be-created nonprofit to distribute funds to California news outlets through a deal between the State and Google. LION also surveyed its members that year, identifying a trend towards investment in newsletters and events.

By 2025, LION had 575 members in the US and Canada, with plans to expand to more countries.

== See also ==
- Global Forum for Media Development
- Impress (regulator)
- Report for America
