= List of special editions of Today (American TV program) =

On the NBC morning news program Today, the designation "special edition" often applies to instances wherein one or both hosts anchor the program from a location other than Studio 1-A, or in the event of significant news developments. The edition also can start before the usual 7 am ET start time in all time zones or go past the usual endtime of 11 am ET. The expansion of an episode is not at all unusual, usually for planned long-duration news events such as presidential inaugurations or elections. The first such expanded edition came on January 20, 1953, with the inauguration of President Dwight D. Eisenhower. Breaking news can also extend the show's hours: during the 7 July 2005 London bombings and Friday following the Boston Marathon bombing, Today remained on the air for six hours, from 7 am to 1 pm EDT.

== 1950s ==
=== 1952 ===
==== February ====
When news of the death of Britain’s King George VI reached New York in the early morning hours of Wednesday, February 6, 1952, the plan for that morning’s show was thrown out and the program instead covered the monarch’s death. News anchor Jim Fleming helped lead coverage that day, and live analysis was provided by NBC foreign correspondent H.V. Kaltenborn.

==== March ====
In part to bring the new show to a wider audience, NBC partnered with Time Magazine to produce a special primetime edition of Today. Dave Garroway, Jack Lescoulie and Jim Fleming anchored the half-hour edition, which aired at 9 pm ET on Monday, March 31, 1952.

==== July ====
Today staff covered the 1952 Republican National Convention in Chicago from July 7–11, 1952. News anchor Jim Fleming traveled to Chicago, and Dave Garroway and Jack Lescoulie remained in New York. To bring the event to the nation, 55 microphones were placed around the convention hall, along with eight cameras and miles of coaxial cables. Ten cities were added to the NBC network for the event, mainly west of the Mississippi River, bringing the estimated audience to some 70,000,000 Americans. The same procedure was followed for the Democratic National Convention, held in the same building July 21–26.

=== 1953 ===
==== January ====
January 20, 1953: Today's first presidential inauguration coverage—the first inauguration of Dwight D. Eisenhower. Dave Garroway and Jack Lescoulie anchored from New York. News anchor Jim Fleming broadcast from Washington for the day's coverage. NBC correspondent Merrill Mueller demonstrated the network's first portable Vidicon television camera, employed for the first time that day.

==== March ====
Soviet leader Joseph Stalin died on March 5, 1953. The time difference between Moscow and New York meant Today would get first crack at the story. The hastily assembled show that morning included analysis from Today news anchor Jim Fleming, who once worked in NBC's Moscow bureau, and veteran NBC foreign correspondent Hans von Kaltenborn. Alexander Kerensky, a former leader of the Russian Provisional Government, was awakened and brought to the RCA Exhibition Hall to add his commentary on Stalin's death.

Twelve days later, March 17, 1953, Garroway hosted the show from the Nevada Test Site to cover an atomic bomb test. The nuclear detonation was carried live on Today at 8:20 am ET (5:20 am local time).

==== June ====
Tuesday morning, June 2, 1953: Today covered the coronation of Elizabeth II, Queen of the United Kingdom and the other Commonwealth realms, in collaboration with the BBC. The BBC provided live audio of the ceremonies. Still pictures taken from television screens in London were faxed to the RCA Exhibition Hall studio, where Garroway would show them to viewers. Multiple correspondents from both NBC and the BBC offered commentary and analysis, both in-studio and on location at Westminster Abbey. Coronation coverage began at 5 am EDT and concluded at 9 am EDT.

=== 1955 ===
==== January ====
The show originated from Miami Beach the week of January 10–14, 1955. The trip was a coordinated effort among Today, Tonight Starring Steve Allen and Home with Arlene Francis. A blurb in the New York Times promised "Seminole Indians wrestling eight-foot alligators, an underwater sound interview and a Dixieland band."

==== October ====
Today originated from Kansas City, Missouri, on Tuesday, October 18, and Wednesday, October 19.

=== 1956 ===
==== April ====
Today broadcast from Los Angeles the week of April 30 – May 4, 1956, in part to inaugurate cross-country NBC News service. In an unusual step Chet Huntley, who helped launch the Huntley-Brinkley Report later that year, anchored alongside Dave Garroway for the week.

==== July ====
Thursday, July 26, 1956: Coverage of the overnight sinking of the Italian ocean liner SS Andrea Doria, which foundered off the coast of Massachusetts. Home-movie film of the aftermath, shot by a passenger, was secured by a Today producer and broadcast on the show. Reporters Paul Cunningham and Dick McCutcheon provided analysis of the collision and subsequent sinking.

==== August ====
Monday, August 20, 1956, Garroway and Lescoulie hosted the show from San Francisco, part of NBC's coverage of the 1956 Democratic National Convention.

==== October ====
Today originated from New Orleans, Louisiana, on October 19, 1956. Segments included a performance from the Al Hirt Dixieland Jazz Band.

=== 1957 ===
==== September ====
September 2–6, 1957, Today originated from Toronto, Ontario, Canada, the first time an American network program broadcast from outside the United States for an extended period.

==== October ====
The entire first hour of the Wednesday, October 2, 1957, edition was dedicated to a discussion of racial issues in America, moderated by Dave Garroway. Guests included American Civil Liberties Union Chairman Ernest Angel, Reverend Theodore Braun, Mississippi Senator James Eastland, and National Urban League director Lester Granger. The hour mixed live discussion and commentary with taped reports from northern and southern cities.

=== 1959 ===
==== April ====
The week of April 27–May 1, 1959, Today originated from Paris, France. Garroway and company spent a week in the French capital, focusing on the art, culture, history and politics of France. Brigitte Bardot and Charles Van Doren appeared on the show. In the days before satellite communications, the Paris shows could not be broadcast live in the United States. Each day's edition was filmed in advance, developed, edited and flown back to New York to be shown the next morning. Both the Paris 1959 and Rome 1960 remotes were broadcast in this manner.

==== September ====
The Tuesday, September 15, 1959, edition of the show was dedicated to an in-depth examination of the life and politics of Soviet Premier Nikita Khrushchev, tied to Krushchev's visit to the United States that week. Guests included reporters Martin Agronsky and Harrison Salisbury, along with George Allen, then-director of the U.S. Office of Information.

== 1960s ==
=== 1960 ===
==== January ====
The eighth anniversary show, broadcast on Thursday, January 14, 1960, was taped entirely in Washington, D.C. Garroway and company visited the Library of Congress. Garroway interviewed then-Senator Everett Dirksen and Speaker of the House Sam Rayburn. The cast toured the Supreme Court building and the White House, and Garroway delivered a commentary on the history of the White House while standing in front of the building.

==== April ====
The week of April 11–15, 1960, Today traveled to Rome, Italy. The Spanish Steps and the Coliseum were toured. Garroway interviewed actor Peter Ustinov, and examples of the culture and society of Italy were demonstrated. The Vatican was toured on Good Friday, April 16. As with the Paris remote the previous year, the Rome segments featuring Garroway and Jack Lescoulie were pre-taped and sent to New York to be spliced with live news updates anchored by Frank Blair and Florence Henderson.

=== 1962 ===
==== April ====
Host John Chancellor, along with Frank Blair, anchored the show from the 1962 World's Fair on Thursday, April 26, 1962. Blair demonstrated a machine that calculated satellite orbits. Chancellor toured a "home of the future" and tried out a computerized library card catalog. The trip marked Today's first broadcast from Seattle, Washington.

=== 1963 ===
==== May ====
Thursday morning, May 16, 1963, Today went on the air at 1:15 am Eastern Time to provide overnight coverage of Mercury astronaut Gordon Cooper's flight. The 22-orbit mission marked the end of Project Mercury.

==== November ====
Today's coverage of the assassination and funeral of JFK. On left, host Hugh Downs alongside contributor Barbara Walters co-anchor Today the day after the assassination. Right, Walters reporting from outside the Capitol on the morning of the funeral, the first time she reported on a national event.

On November 23, 1963, Today aired a special three-hour Saturday program recapping the assassination of President John F. Kennedy the previous day. Host Hugh Downs, Jack Lescoulie, and newsreader Frank Blair anchored the broadcast. In the opening minutes, Downs noted that the atmosphere that day "was very different" from what he had ever previously experienced. Lescoulie recalled how traffic in New York City after the assassination was at a standstill, and that telephone circuits were jammed. Downs added that as the hours passed, the country's grief would turn into a "more historic kind of grief." Man-on-the-street reports were gathered by Barbara Walters. Sander Vanocur reported from the White House, with Martin Agronsky in Washington and Pauline Frederick at the United Nations in New York.

The Monday, November 25, 1963, edition covered President Kennedy's funeral. Downs anchored from an NBC Washington studio, while Blair, Walters, and Vanocur in Washington provided standup reports. For Walters, this marked the first time she had reported on a national event, as she reported from outside the United States Capitol, where Kennedy lay in state, saying, "These are the honor guards who have been guarding the casket of President Kennedy."

=== 1964 ===
==== July ====
The week of Monday, July 6, through Thursday, July 9, 1964, Today broadcast from the Republican National Convention in San Francisco. Downs, Blair, Lescoulie and Maureen O'Sullivan hosted the show from the lobby of the Hilton Hotel.

=== 1965 ===
==== February ====
The morning of February 22, 1965, saw a special expanded edition covering the assassination of Malcolm X the day before. Today ran coverage until 11 am.

==== May ====
Following the launch of NASA's Early Bird satellite on May 3, 1965, Today cast and crew traveled to Europe for a special live broadcast of the show. Host Hugh Downs was stationed at Westminster Abbey in London, Barbara Walters was in Paris, Jack Lescoulie was in Amsterdam, and Frank Blair reported from the steps of the United States Capitol in Washington. Pope Paul VI read a message live from the Vatican, marveling at the communications now possible between nations.

=== 1967 ===
==== March ====
A television news strike in the spring of 1967 forced Today into an awkward position: either go on the air hostless, as Hugh Downs joined the picket line, or play back a rerun of a previous edition. The network went with the latter solution on Monday, March 29, 1967. Viewers instead saw a rerun of the July 4, 1966, edition of the program.

=== 1968 ===
==== April ====
The April 5, 1968, edition of the program covered the assassination of Dr. Martin Luther King Jr. the day before, Today expanded until 10 am.

==== June ====
Thursday morning, June 6, 1968, saw a special edition continuing NBC's overnight coverage of the assassination of Senator Robert F. Kennedy. Today coverage ran until 10 am EDT.

=== 1969 ===
==== July ====
Hugh Downs traveled to the Kennedy Space Center in Florida to anchor Today on Wednesday, July 16, 1969, the day Apollo 11 lifted off on its journey to the Moon. Frank Blair anchored newscasts from an NBC News space-themed studio in New York.

== 1970s ==
=== 1971 ===
==== October ====
Friday, October 15, 1971, saw an expanded edition of the show, broadcast live from Persepolis, Iran. The show commemorated the 2,500th anniversary of the Persian Empire. Frank McGee remained in New York, while Walters anchored from Persepolis. The program ran until 10 am EDT.

=== 1973 ===
==== January ====
On Wednesday, January 24, 1973, Today expanded to 3 hours and broadcast from Washington as McGee and Barbara Walters reported on the latest developments in the cease-fire agreement to end the U.S. involvement in the Vietnam War, as President Richard Nixon gave a speech to reach the agreement the night before. They also reported on the preparations in Washington for the state funeral of former president Lyndon B. Johnson, whose body was flown to Washington from Texas that morning.

On Thursday, January 25, 1973, Today, like the day before, expanded to 3 hours and broadcast from Washington in order to allow McGee and Walters to anchor live coverage of the state funeral for President Johnson. At 10 am, EST, the Today portion of coverage ended, with newscaster David Brinkley in Washington taking over from that point until the conclusion of the ceremony and analysis. McGee said before the handover, "This concludes the Today program's special extended coverage of the final ceremonies and funeral services for former president Lyndon Johnson. NBC News will continue its full coverage of the funeral with David Brinkley commenting after this brief pause for station identification."

=== 1974 ===
==== August ====
Walters and Hartz co-anchor continuing coverage of the resignation of President Nixon.

On Friday morning, August 9, 1974, Today was expanded to five hours and broadcast from Washington to cover the resignation of President Richard Nixon. Walters and Hartz co-anchor, with NBC News Washington correspondent Douglas Kiker providing live commentary during Nixon's final speech from the White House and the family's departure via helicopter to California that morning. As with the funeral for President Johnson a year and a half earlier, the main division of NBC News took over coverage from Today about thirty minutes or so before Gerald Ford took the oath of office, with Nightly News anchor John Chancellor, Kiker, then-correspondent Ron Nessen, Tom Pettit, Tom Brokaw, John Cochran, and Catherine Mackin commenting.

=== 1975 ===
==== March ====
Friday, March 14, 1975, marked the end of Frank Blair's 23-year tenure as Today's newsreader. A special farewell edition featured visits from Jack Lescoulie, John Chancellor, Edwin Newman and former "Women's Editor" Estelle Parsons.

==== July ====
A special three-hour edition on Tuesday, July 15, 1975, covered the launch of Soyuz 19. The Soyuz launch, a part of the Apollo-Soyuz Test Project, was the first Soviet launch ever telecast, as well as a first for American television. Jim Hartz and Barbara Walters anchored.

=== 1976 ===
Throughout 1975 and 1976, Today anchors Jim Hartz and Barbara Walters traveled the country to celebrate the American Bicentennial. Each Friday morning, one or both hosts would anchor the show from one of the fifty states.

==== July ====
NASA's Viking 1 spacecraft landed on Mars on Tuesday, July 20, 1976. Today mounted a three-hour special chronicling the landing. Lloyd Dobyns and Gene Shalit substituted for Hartz. NBC's Roy Neal reported from Viking mission control at JPL in Pasadena, California. Viking 1 touchdown took place within the show's first hour in the Eastern Time Zone. The first transmitted pictures began to trickle in during the 8 am EDT hour. Dobyns, Neal and Shalit continued coverage into the 9 am hour as more pictures and data streamed in. Carl Sagan and Isaac Asimov were in attendance at JPL, and Neal conducted a live interview with both men shortly after touchdown.

== 1980s ==
=== 1980 ===
Brokaw co-anchoring coverage the morning after the late-night killing of John Lennon

The show airing on December 9, 1980, was a special edition from New York as co-anchors Tom Brokaw and Jane Pauley covered the assassination of singer-songwriter and Beatle John Lennon the night before. NBC News correspondents reported on Lennon's assassination and public reaction toward the shooting.

=== 1981 ===
==== March ====
The show airing on March 31, 1981, was broadcast from Washington, as part of its coverage of the assassination attempt on President Ronald Reagan the day before. Brokaw and Pauley anchored.

==== May ====
On May 14, 1981, Tom Brokaw was stationed in St. Peter's Square in Rome to cover the assassination attempt on Pope John Paul II the previous day.

==== July ====
On July 29, 1981, the program originated from London with Tom Brokaw and Jane Pauley commenting on the wedding of the Prince of Wales and Lady Diana Spencer. Additional analysis was provided by Tina Brown.

==== October ====
Just before the 7:24 am station break on the morning of October 6, 1981, word reached NBC of the shooting of Egyptian president Anwar Sadat. Tom Brokaw announced what was known at the time, then threw to the commercial break. Upon returning at 7:30, Brokaw began what turned out to be seven-and-a-half hours of coverage—a Today record. NBC's Cairo bureau chief Art Kent provided live telephone reports, as Egyptian television stations ceased broadcast in the chaotic aftermath of the shooting. In studio and over the phone, Brokaw interviewed experts on the Middle East, foreign policy and international relations until 3 pm, Eastern Time. NBC Nightly News anchor John Chancellor anchored with Brokaw.

=== 1985 ===
==== May ====
The week of May 20 to 24, 1985, Gumbel, Pauley and Scott took the show on the rails. The "Today Express" was a specially outfitted passenger train that took the cast and crew to special broadcasts in Houston, New Orleans, Memphis, Indianapolis and Cincinnati.

==== August ====
August 19, 1985, brought Today back to its streetside roots with "Today at Night," a special primetime broadcast from the Channel Gardens at Rockefeller Center. Guests for the nighttime broadcast included then-House Speaker Tip O'Neill, Don Johnson and Philip Michael Thomas of Miami Vice. This primetime special was interrupted by David Letterman who, during the live filming of the show, announced over a bullhorn that he was the president of NBC News and that he was not wearing pants. The incident aired on that night's episode of Late Night with David Letterman and sparked a feud between Gumbel and Letterman.

=== 1986 ===
==== January ====
On Wednesday morning, January 29, 1986, a special edition covered the Space Shuttle Challenger disaster the previous day. Former astronauts David Scott and Alan Bean, former Flight Director Gerry Griffin and Senators Jake Garn and Pete Domenici were among the guests providing analysis and commentary on the tragedy.

==== May ====
On the week of May 19, 1986, the special week-long 2-hour edition was live from the SS Norway. Aboard was the hosts Bryant Gumbel and Jane Pauley, and the man with the weather that time was Willard Scott. During that week, the SS Norway traveled from the Carolinas to South Florida.

==== July ====
On Wednesday Morning, July 23, 1986, a special edition covered the Wedding of Prince Andrew and Sarah Ferguson at Westminster Abbey in London. With hosts Bryant Gumbel and Jane Pauley from their booth little far away from Buckingham Palace.

=== 1989 ===
==== May ====
Today spent the third week of May 1989, traveling down the West Coast. Gumbel, Pauley and Scott kicked off the trip in Seattle on Monday, May 22. Portland hosted the cast on Tuesday, May 23. Segments profiled the logging industry and deserts of eastern Oregon. The Wednesday, May 24, show originated from San Francisco and featured discussions about AIDS research and California cuisine. Thursday, May 25, the cast traveled to Los Angeles, and the week concluded with a stop in San Diego on Friday, May 26.

==== October ====
The October 18, 1989, edition covered the Loma Prieta earthquake the day before. The show ran until noon Eastern Time. Gumbel, Pauley and Norville anchored from Chicago (where they had planned to originally do a special celebratory edition), with reports done by Bob Jamieson and Don Oliver in San Francisco, and George Lewis in Oakland. Jim Miklasewski and Bob Hager covered disaster response from Washington. NBC Sports commentators Bob Costas and Jimmy Cefalo discussed the effect the temblor would have on the 1989 World Series.

== 1990s ==
=== 1994 ===
==== January ====
A 6.7-magnitude earthquake struck southern California on Monday morning, January 17, 1994. Today was in progress; when news reached the studio at 7:47 am EST, Bryant Gumbel and Katie Couric broke format and interviewed witnesses via phone. When the sun rose on the West Coast, allowing pictures of the damage to come in, they switched to a mix of audio and video reports from survivors, emergency respondents and officials. Today remained on until noon Eastern Time.

==== May ====
On the day following the death of Ayrton Senna, a special edition of Today was held to cover the latest developments. Couric and Gumbel had coverage from New York. NBC had permission from the Globo television network and Eduardo Souto Neto to use the Victory's Theme in a montage with the best moments of Senna at the end of the show.

A special edition of Today was held to cover the funeral of Jacqueline Kennedy. Couric and Gumbel had coverage from New York. The coverage lasted four hours before switching to NBC News Special Reports.

==== June ====
NBC News devoted significant resources to covering the 50th anniversary of the D-Day invasion. Two special editions of Today were produced that weekend. The first, on Friday, June 3, 1994, featured Bryant Gumbel in Normandy, with Katie Couric anchoring in New York. The second took place on D-Day itself, Monday, June 6. Gumbel and Couric anchored five hours of coverage from Omaha Beach, and were joined for most of the day by Nightly News anchor Tom Brokaw.

=== 1995 ===
==== April ====
The show airing on April 20, 1995, was a special edition covering the Oklahoma City bombing the previous day. Gumbel reported from Oklahoma City.

=== 1996 ===
==== July ====
The show airing on July 18, 1996, was a special edition covering the TWA Flight 800 crash the night before.

=== 1997 ===
==== January ====
The show airing on January 3, 1997, was a celebration of Bryant Gumbel's run on the program, the day before the 15th anniversary of his debut on January 4, 1982.

==== April ====
On April 7, 1997, the show was broadcast live from Las Vegas with Katie, Matt and Al live on the trip and Ann live from KVBC-TV (now KSNV), the NBC affiliate in Las Vegas.

==== September ====
On September 6, 1997, the show was expanded in order to cover the funeral of Diana, Princess of Wales. Matt Lauer anchored from Studio 1A in New York, while Couric and Tom Brokaw anchored from Westminster Abbey in Britain.

=== 1999 ===
The show airing on April 21, 1999, covered the Columbine High School Massacre with Lauer in New York, and Couric on-site in Littleton, Colorado.

== 2000s ==
=== 2000 ===
==== November ====
The show airing on November 8, 2000, the morning after the contested presidential election in the United States, was the most-watched edition of the program in its history, with 12 million viewers, double the normal audience, tuning in.

=== 2001 ===
==== September ====
When terrorists attacked the World Trade Center in New York City on September 11, 2001, Today was on the air. Lauer interrupted an interview with author Richard Hack and announced that there was a breaking story in progress at 8:52 am EDT, but threw to a commercial break when pictures were not available. Today returned indefinitely at 8:53 am ET with Lauer, Couric, and Roker commenting on the events from the couch area of Studio 1A, initially reported as an accident. When United Flight 175 crashed at 9:02:58 am, it was seen live on the program. Katie Couric handled the initial reports of the attack on The Pentagon as Lauer joined Tom Brokaw at the anchor desk. The broadcast restarted at 10:30 am EDT, moments after the collapse of One World Trade Center. Couric, Lauer and Brokaw anchored live coverage under the production of the Today team until 1 pm EDT when Brokaw anchored an NBC News Special Report from NBC News Headquarters in 30 Rockefeller Plaza. NBC News Chief Foreign Affairs Correspondent Andrea Mitchell wrote in her memoir Talking Back that her husband, then Federal Reserve Chairman Alan Greenspan, received his first briefing on the attacks when she summarized events for Brokaw on the air with her cell phone in her lap. Couric and Lauer anchored a special report from 5 pm until 6:30 pm so Brokaw could prepare for a special, expanded edition of NBC Nightly News, airing from the observation deck atop 30 Rockefeller Plaza, and continuing NBC News live coverage throughout the evening. Today expanded to six hours daily for the remainder of the week that followed the attacks. Beginning with the fifth anniversary of the attacks, on September 11, 2006, MSNBC replayed Today as it covered the attacks.

=== 2002 ===
==== January ====
The show airing on January 14, 2002, was a three-hour long celebration of the show's 50th anniversary. It was branded "A very special edition of 'Today.'" Anniversary shows often abandon typical format (outside of top-of-the-hour news updates) in favor of clips of old shows, interviews with previous hosts and other special segments tied to the occasion. For this show, the original opening music and intro to the show from 1952 was used, and several retrospectives were aired from former anchors, guests, producers and viewers.

==== September ====
On September 11, 2002, the show was extended to six hours (broadcasting until 1 pm Eastern Time) for a special edition covering the anniversary of the terrorist attacks from one year earlier.

=== 2003 ===
==== April ====
On April 9, 2003 Today aired live until noon EST when U.S. troops entered Baghdad. Lester Holt filled in for Lauer, hosting alongside Katie Couric. Today coverage was restarted as an NBC News Special Report at 9:12 am EST and Tom Brokaw joined Couric in Studio 1A until taking over the coverage from NBC News headquarters in 30 Rockefeller Plaza at noon.

==== May ====
On May 12, 2003, Jay Leno guest hosted on the program in New York City while Katie Couric is in Los Angeles for her guest hosting on The Tonight Show through their trading places.

=== 2005 ===
==== April ====
When Pope John Paul II died on Saturday, April 2, 2005, Katie Couric and Matt Lauer anchored the weekend editions of the Today show. Lauer anchored from the Vatican with Campbell Brown offering reports by his side. On the day of the Pope's death, Couric anchored a special report on a Vatican statement updating the Pope's dire condition and Lauer reported for the bulletin anchored by Brian Williams when the Pope was officially dead. He returned to New York as Couric traveled to Vatican City to co-anchor coverage of the Pope's funeral with Williams.

==== July ====
Today aired a live, six-hour special edition similar to that of the September 11, 2001 attacks after the London transit bombings on July 7, 2005. The show was anchored by Couric, along with Lester Holt substituting for a vacationing Matt Lauer. The program began at 7 am EDT as usual, but then went live in all time zones until 1 pm EDT, instead of the usual tape-delay format. Frequent updates from NBC correspondents Ron Allen and James Hattori in London were augmented by stateside analysis from terrorism expert Roger Cressey. Today broke format multiple times for NBC News Special Reports covering remarks from both President George W. Bush and British Prime Minister Tony Blair, at the G8 Summit in Gleneagles, Scotland.

The next day's show was labeled a special edition. Campbell Brown's large presence during that day's coverage, in addition to her presence on the show during the death of Pope John Paul II fueled speculation she would replace Couric in the near future.

==== August ====
Weekend Today offered an expanded edition on Saturday morning, August 27, as Hurricane Katrina bore down on the U.S. Gulf Coast. Campbell Brown and David Gregory anchored from New York, and the show ran for an additional hour, until 10 am EDT.

The Today staff produced a six-hour edition of the show on Monday, August 29, as Hurricane Katrina made landfall along the Gulf Coast. Brian Williams phoned in reports from the Louisiana Superdome and correspondents on the Louisiana and Mississippi coasts filed spotty phone and video reports. Shows in the storm's wake often carried the "special edition" branding, as Katie Couric, Campbell Brown, Lester Holt and others were stationed along the Gulf Coast instead of Studio 1-A. Remarks from President Bush and other emergency officials were often integrated into Today's coverage cycle.

=== 2006 ===
==== May ====
The show airing on May 31, 2006, was a three-hour long celebration of Katie Couric's run on the show.

==== July ====
On July 12, 2006, Matt Lauer traveled to St. Petersburg, Russia, airing his interview with Russian President, Vladimir Putin.

==== August ====
On August 10, 2006, in response to the foiled terror plot in London, Today broadcast live in its timeslot for all time zones, and Matt Lauer anchored three NBC News Special Reports live in all time zones, at 6 am EDT to report on the details of the story, at 8 am EDT when U.S. counter-terrorism officials held a news conference at the Department of Homeland Security in Washington, D.C., and at 11:45 am EDT when President Bush made remarks upon landing in Wisconsin from just outside Air Force One.

On Tuesday, August 29, 2006, Today marked the first anniversary of Hurricane Katrina's landfall. Lauer and Curry anchored from New York, while Brian Williams, Campbell Brown, Lester Holt and many other NBC News correspondents reported from the Gulf Coast. The show featured interviews with New Orleans Mayor Ray Nagin and former Federal Emergency Management Agency (FEMA) Director Michael Brown, and first lady Laura Bush.

==== September ====
Another long-format special edition was aired on Monday, September 11, 2006, to mark the fifth anniversary of the 2001 attacks. Matt Lauer anchored the coverage from Ground Zero and was joined by Tom Brokaw and Campbell Brown. Ann Curry was in the temporary outdoor studio in Rockefeller Plaza. Lester Holt reported from the Pentagon and Natalie Morales was stationed in Shanksville, Pennsylvania. For viewers in the New York Market, WNBC broke away from Today at 8:25 am EDT to give detailed coverage of the observance at Ground Zero, anchored by the team at Today in New York, as they have done every year.

=== 2007 ===
==== January ====
The show airing on January 2, 2007, covered the funeral of former president Gerald Ford with Meredith Vieira in Studio 1A and Matt Lauer in Washington. The show was cut to two hours, allowing Brian Williams to assume coverage at 9 am EST.

On January 17, 2007, Matt Lauer, Meredith Vieira, Ann Curry, and Al Roker Broadcast this program from Hollywood, Los Angeles, California.

==== April ====
The April 17 and 18, 2007, editions of the show with Lauer and Vieira reporting live on the Virginia Tech massacre. Tuesday's show ran four hours, until 11 am EDT.

==== November ====
From November 5 to 9, 2007, Today launched a miniseries of unprecedented broadcasts. "Today Goes to the Ends of the Earth" was a broadcast in which Lauer reported from the Arctic Circle, Roker reported from the Equator and Curry reported from McMurdo Station in Antarctica and on November 9 from the South Pole via videotape. Vieira tied the segments together, anchoring live from Studio 1-A. The effort was designed to highlight the causes and effects of global warming as a part of NBC Universal's "Green is Universal" campaign.

On Tuesday, November 20, 2007, a split edition billed as a "Thanksgiving Travel Countdown" placed Vieira at Hartsfield-Jackson International Airport in Atlanta, the nation's busiest. Other correspondents reported Chicago O'Hare International Airport and LaGuardia Airport. Lauer remained in Studio 1-A.

=== 2008 ===
==== January ====
On Tuesday, January 29, 2008, a special split edition placed Vieira outside Buckingham Palace. She had an exclusive interview with The Duke of York featuring updates on the British Royal Family.

==== February ====
On February 4 and 5, 2008, Today covered the Super Tuesday primaries and caucuses. Andrea Mitchell covered the Democratic side, and David Gregory covered the Republican side. Lauer and Vieira remained in New York.

On February 12, 2008, Meredith Vieira and Al Roker were both live at Georgia Aquarium. They reported on information covering the aquarium and had reports on the fish and, how the crew feeds them and keep them healthy. This special edition was a split edition with Matt Lauer live in Studio 1-A.

On February 21 and 22, 2008, the cast and crew aired a two-day special called "Today Takes a Winter Break". On the first day, Lauer, Vieira, Curry and Roker originated from Sugarbush Resort in Warren, Vermont. On the second day, the anchors broadcast from South Beach in Miami, Florida.

==== April ====
In April 2008, special editions of Today featured Pope Benedict XVI's visit to the United States, billed as "The Pope Visits the USA." On Tuesday, April 16, the pontiff's 81st birthday, Matt Lauer hosted the show from the south lawn of the White House to cover the pope's meeting with President George W. Bush. On Saturday, April 19, Benedict's third anniversary as pope, Weekend Today anchors Lester Holt and Jenna Wolfe moved outside to Rockefeller Center to cover the first papal mass at St. Patrick's Cathedral in New York City for the first half-hour.

On Monday, April 21, 2008, First Lady Laura Bush hosted the third hour of the program. It marked the first time such an event occurred on Today.

==== May ====
On Friday, May 10, 2008, Weekend Today covered the wedding of Jenna Bush at the President's ranch outside Crawford, Texas. Holt remained in Studio 1A, while Amy Robach covered the wedding from Texas.

==== June ====
On Saturday, June 14, 2008, Lauer and Brokaw anchored a special edition entitled "Remembering Tim Russert", following the death of the Meet the Press moderator and NBC Washington Bureau Chief the previous day. Andrea Mitchell, David Gregory, Pete Williams, Lisa Myers, Face the Nation host Bob Schieffer, This Week host George Stephanopoulos, and Vice President Dick Cheney, among others, appeared onToday and gave tributes to Russert and shared stories of his life and career. On Wednesday, June 18, Lauer, Vieira, Curry, and Roker broadcast from the network's Washington bureau ahead of Russert's funeral and memorial service. Natalie Morales remained in Studio 1A and took over at 8:30 am, along with Amy Robach.

==== August ====
From August 8 to 22, both weekday and weekend versions of the show aired from the Olympics, in Beijing, China. The portable outdoor studio that debuted with the 2004 summer games in Athens housed the cast and crew once more. The fourth hour did not air during the games.

Matt Lauer hosted Today from the Democratic National Convention in Denver on Wednesday, August 27 and Thursday, August 28. A week later, on Thursday, September 4 and Friday, September 5, Meredith Vieira anchored from the Republican National Convention in St. Paul.

==== November ====
The Monday, November 4, and Tuesday, November 5, editions of the program were billed as "special editions" as part of NBC's larger Decision 2008 election coverage.

During the week of November 17, all four anchors were on location as part of NBC's Green Week. Meredith Vieira was in Australia, Matt Lauer went to Belize, Al Roker traveled to Iceland, and Ann Curry scaled Mount Kilimanjaro. Vieira, Lauer, and Roker visited different cities or locations each day of the broadcast. Lester Holt filled in at the news desk in New York. Vieira also appeared during the third hour of Today, a rarity due to her contractual obligations to Who Wants to Be a Millionaire.

=== 2009 ===
==== January ====
Coverage on January 16, following the ditching of US Airways Flight 1549 in New York's Hudson River, was billed as "Miracle on the Hudson."

Coverage of the inauguration of President Barack Obama dominated the January 19 and 20 editions of Today, as the four anchors broadcast from Washington on both days. On the 19th, Matt Lauer and Meredith Vieira anchored all four hours from the network's Capitol Hill studios on 400 North Capitol St. Natalie Morales joined them during the third hour. Al Roker did the weather from the Mall, Ann Curry did the news headlines from the newsroom in the network's Washington bureau, but both came to the Capitol Hill studios at 9:30 am ET. On the 20th, Curry reported from the Mall, while Roker was at The Pentagon, but neither came to the studios. Brian Williams joined Lauer and Vieira at 10 am ET and took over coverage at 10:15 am ET. Kathie Lee Gifford and Hoda Kotb were not on the air both days.

==== March ====
On March 3, Lauer anchored from the floor of the New York Stock Exchange. The previous day, Dow Jones Industrial Average had dropped to its lowest level—6763.29—since April 25, 1997. Meredith Vieira remained at Rockefeller Plaza. However, Lauer came to the studio at the 8 am half-hour.

On March 16, Al Roker and Meredith Vieira anchored from Ireland, Called "TODAY in Ireland". Matt Lauer is off from Studio 1-A.

==== May ====
Friday morning, May 8, Lauer, Vieira, Roker and Curry opened the program from the Statue of Liberty's crown, a place inaccessible to the public since 2001. Secretary of the Interior Ken Salazar was on hand to announce the crown would reopen to limited crowds on Fourth of July. Segments explored the history and symbolism of the statue, and a tour of nearby Ellis Island was shown.

==== June ====
Friday, June 26, saw a tribute to Michael Jackson and Farrah Fawcett, who died the day before. The coverage spanned all four hours of the program with Vieira reporting live from Hollywood and Vine in Los Angeles and Lauer in the New York studio.

== 2010s ==
=== 2010 ===
==== February ====
The Today cast and crew were in Vancouver for the Olympics from February 8 to 26, 2010. Rather than using the portable outdoor studio that was used during previous Olympic games since the 2004 Summer games in Athens, the cast and crew broadcast all four hours live each day from the atrium in Grouse Mountain, overlooking Vancouver.

=== 2011 ===
==== March ====
In March 2011, Today featured a series of special editions on the 2011 9.0-magnitude earthquake in Japan and the subsequent incidents at the Fukushima I Nuclear Power Plant with Ann Curry reporting from Japan. Initial coverage begins at 7 am EDT on March 11, with the first two hours of the program covering the earthquake and tsunami exclusively. KNTV meteorologist Jeff Ranieri reported on the tsunami's West Coast impact from San Francisco, and Vieira, Roker and Curry updated viewers from Today from the Midtown Manhattan studios. An additional hour was produced for the West Coast beginning 7 am PDT.

==== April ====
In April 2011 the Today ran special editions for the royal wedding of Prince William and Catherine Middleton with Meredith Vieira reporting live from London. On April 28 and 29, the entire Today cast and crew broadcast the entire show from London, broadcasting all four hours live from London on the 28, and on the 29th, the Today show was expanded to seven hours, broadcasting beginning 4 am ET (9 am GMT) and the cast and crew broadcast all seven hours live from London. However, due to the 2011 Super Outbreak, the Today team led the coverage, rather than NBC Nightly News anchor Brian Williams.

==== May ====
On May 2, Today ran a special edition the day after the late evening announcement of the death of Osama bin Laden by President Barack Obama. Meredith Vieira anchored in-studio from the Midtown Manhattan studios and Matt Lauer on-location from Ground Zero in Lower Manhattan, the site of the September 11, 2001, terrorist attacks; Tom Brokaw contributed.

==== August ====
From August 26–28, Today featured a series of special editions with continuing coverage of Hurricane Irene as it makes multiple United States landfalls along the Outer Banks of North Carolina, the Delmarva Peninsula, and the Northeast megalopolis area of the mid-Atlantic and Northeast. Ann Curry anchored during weekday edition, and Amy Robach the Saturday edition, respectively, both co-anchored by Carl Quintanilla, (substituting for Lauer and Holt); Lauer and Curry anchored the Sunday edition in-studio with Al Roker reports live from the Outer Banks and Long Island all three editions

==== October ====
The Thursday, October 6 edition of "Today" began with a focus on Apple co-founder Steve Jobs, who had died the previous evening. Matt Lauer and Ann Curry anchored this special edition of "Today" from Studio 1A. Correspondent George Lewis, who was live in California, narrated an opening piece about Jobs' life. The broadcast also featured interviews with Time managing editor Richard Stengel and NBC's Tom Brokaw as well as Jobs' co-founder and friend Steve Wozniak. At one point, Matt Lauer used a simple gesture to show Jobs' widespread influence by asking the outdoor audience to show off their iPods & iPhones. Lauer himself showed Jobs' memorial at apple.com on his iPad.

=== 2012 ===
==== January ====
Friday, January 13 edition of "Today" celebrated 60 years of the show. Presented by hosts Matt Lauer and Ann Curry from the Midtown Manhattan studios, featuring all living prior anchors and on-air talent for the landmark anniversary; included an appearance by Tom Hanks.

==== June ====
Tuesday, June 5 edition of "Today" broadcast extended coverage of the last day of public ceremonies for the Diamond Jubilee of Elizabeth II live from London, presented by anchor Matt Lauer and special co-anchor Meredith Vieira (the latter who ended regularly co-hosting duties in 2011).

==== July ====
On Friday, July 20, "Today" broadcast four hours of live, bi-coastal coverage of the breaking news of the 2012 Aurora, Colorado shooting from Studio 1-A, presented by anchors Matt Lauer and Savannah Guthrie, with co-presentation by Natalie Morales and Al Roker with national weather forecasts.

==== December ====
On Friday, December 14, just after "Today" signed off for the day, a shooting occurred at Sandy Hook Elementary School in Newtown, CT. Then 'Weekend Today anchor Lester Holt anchored special coverage from Studio 3B that afternoon and evening. On Saturday, December 15, and Sunday, December 16, both the weekday and weekend anchors (Matt Lauer, Savannah Guthrie, Lester Holt, and Erica Hill) anchored "Today" live from Newtown, CT, while Jenna Wolfe and Dylan Dreyer provided other news and weather information from the NY studio. On Monday, December 17, Lauer returned to the studio while Guthrie remained in Newtown.

=== 2013 ===
==== April ====
From Tuesday, April 16–17, Matt Lauer and Lester Holt anchor on-location coverage of the aftermath of the Boston Marathon bombing with Savannah Guthrie anchoring in Studio 1A. April 19, "Today" features extended, bicoastal coverage of developments in the apprehension of suspects in Boston bombings anchored by Guthrie in Studio 1A, with Lauer covering the aftermath of the West explosion in Texas.

==== May ====
On May 20, 2013, Lauer, Guthrie, and Morales were anchoring from Hawaii, which was part of a supposed to be week long road trip. Roker was anchoring from Moore, Oklahoma. They were going to continue to Yellowstone National park the next day, but they had to have coverage from Oklahoma.

On May 21, 2013, the day after an EF-5 tornado destroyed much of Moore, Oklahoma, Lauer, Guthrie, and Roker anchored the program from the ground of Moore, OK, while Morales was in a helicopter owned and operated by Oklahoma City NBC affiliate KFOR-TV. The next day, May 22, 2013, all anchors returned to Studio 1A except for Lauer, who continued to anchor coverage from Moore, Oklahoma.

==== December ====
On December 6, the day after Nelson Mandela died, the Today Show had a special edition commemorating him with Lester Holt reporting from South Africa.

=== 2015 ===
==== February ====
On February 1, Special Edition of Sunday TODAY at Super Bowl XLIX. Lester Holt, Erica Hill, Dylan Dreyer, and Sheinelle Jones anchored from Studio 1-A and Al Roker anchored from Glendale, Arizona.

=== 2017 ===
==== September ====
On September 11, 2017, a Special Edition of TODAY with Savannah Guthrie and Matt Lauer began at 6 am ET/3 am PT, reporting on Hurricane Irma. In the New York Market, WNBC kept tradition in breaking away at 8:25 am ET with the Today in New York team anchoring live coverage of the ceremonies at Ground Zero marking the sixteenth anniversary of the September 11 attacks.

==== October ====
On October 2, 2017, a Special Edition of TODAY with Savannah Guthrie and Matt Lauer began at 5 am ET/2 am PT to facilitate continuous coverage of the previous evening's Las Vegas shooting as an NBC News Special Report. It would be Lauer's last Special Edition as a TODAY anchor.

=== 2018 ===
==== April ====
The week of Monday April 23 featured members of the TODAY team anchoring from Florence, Italy. This included the entire 4th hour as Kathie Lee Gifford and Hoda Kotb hosted on a balcony overlooking Italy's wine country.

==== May ====
On Saturday May 19, TODAY aired a special edition that began at 4:30am ET and ended at 10am ET. Savannah Guthrie and Hoda Kotb hosted live coverage of the Royal Wedding from a special vantage point overseeing Windsor Castle. On Friday, May 18, the day before the Royal Wedding, the TODAY team anchored a special edition too. The third and fourth hour programs were live from Windsor too. The TODAY coverage held the most ratings for the Royal Wedding in the US.

== 2020s ==
=== 2020 ===
==== March and April ====
In March and April 2020 Today featured a series of special editions on the COVID-19 pandemic. From 18 to 30 March, 3–13 April and 16 April Savannah Guthrie hosted the show live from home, while Hoda Kotb hosted the show live from Studio 1A.

==== June ====
On June 1, amid protests and unrest following the police murder of George Floyd the week before, the show was co-hosted by Hoda Kotb from Studio 1A, and Savannah Guthrie hosted from New York City, covering the protests on.

=== 2021 ===
==== January 7 ====
Following the January 6 United States Capitol attack the previous day, the show was co-hosted by Hoda Kotb from Studio 1A and Savannah Guthrie reporting from the United States Capitol for the first hour, and Studio N5 in Washington D.C. for the remainder of the show.

==== September 11 ====
Savannah Guthrie and Hoda Kotb co-hosted a special edition of Today live from the World Trade Center, as part of NBC News' coverage of the 20th anniversary of the September 11 attacks.

=== 2022 ===
==== May 25 ====
Following the Robb Elementary School shooting in Uvalde, Texas the previous day, the show was co-hosted by Hoda Kotb and Craig Melvin from Studio 1A and Savannah Guthrie from Uvalde.

==== September 9 ====
Following the announcement of the death of Queen Elizabeth II the day before, the show was co-hosted by Hoda Kotb from Studio 1A and Savannah Guthrie from Buckingham Palace.

==== September 19 ====
Hoda Kotb, Savannah Guthrie and Lester Holt co-hosted a special edition of Today live from Westminster Abbey, as part of NBC News' coverage of the state funeral of Queen Elizabeth II.

=== 2024 ===
==== July 14 ====
Following the attempted assassination of former President Donald Trump the previous day, Savannah Guthrie and Willie Geist hosted a special Sunday edition of Today from Studio 1A and was simulcasted on MSNBC and NBC News NOW.

=== 2025 ===
==== January 30 ====
The morning after the 2025 Potomac River mid-air collision, a special edition of TODAY began with reporting from the scene.

==== April 21 ====
Following the death of Pope Francis the same day, the show was hosted by Savannah Guthrie and Craig Melvin from Studio 1A.

=== 2026 ===
==== July 4 ====
On the United States Semiquincentennial a special Saturday edition of Today was hosted by Guthrie and Melvin at Governors Island, with live reporting from naval fleet ships during that day's festivities for Sail250.

== Traditional special editions ==
Every Thanksgiving Day (since 2000), Today is truncated to two hours as the Today crew host the Macy's Thanksgiving Day Parade. The parade, produced by NBC's entertainment division and not NBC News, occupies what would normally be the show's third and fourth hours. During the two hours Today is on the air, there are substitute hosts in Studio 1A as the Today crew prepare to host the parade.

During coverage of presidential inaugurations or other major events scheduled in Washington, D.C., the show broadcasts either from NBC's Capitol Hill studios or from NBC's Washington bureau. During NBC's coverage of the Olympic Games, the program is presented live from the hosting city no matter the time zone and with the weekday team presenting most of the program in lieu of the weekend anchor teams.

When special events or breaking news happen on the West Coast, one or more anchors will host the show from NBC's Los Angeles bureau.
