= K15CU-D =

Television station in Salinas, California

- Salinas–Monterey, California; United States
- City: Salinas, California
- Channels: Digital: 15 (UHF); Virtual: 15

Programming
- Affiliations: 15.1: Cozi TV; for others, see § Subchannels

Ownership
- Owner: NBC Owned Television Stations; (NBC Telemundo License LLC)
- Sister stations: KNTV (San Jose); KSTS

History
- First air date: February 16, 1990; (as translator of KSTS)
- Former call signs: K15CU (1989–2011, 2011–2014); DK15CU (2011)
- Former channel numbers: Analog: 15 (UHF, 1989–2014)
- Former affiliations: Telemundo (1989–2014)
- Call sign meaning: Sequentially assigned by FCC

Technical information
- Licensing authority: FCC
- Facility ID: 64979
- Class: LD
- ERP: 5.74 kW
- HAAT: 664.9 m (2,181 ft)
- Transmitter coordinates: 36°45′22.8″N 121°30′8.7″W

Links
- Public license information: LMS
- Website: www.cozitv.com

K15CU-D (channel 15) is a low-power television station licensed to Salinas, California, United States, broadcasting the digital multicast network Cozi TV to the Monterey Bay area. Owned by the NBC Owned Television Stations group, it relays the second digital subchannel of KNTV from San Jose. K15CU-D's transmitter is located on Fremont Peak in the Gabilan Mountains above San Juan Bautista, California, over 3,100 feet (940 m) above sea level.

== History ==
The station was put on air on February 16, 1990 (by Telemundo, then under separate ownership), as a translator of KSTS in San Francisco. The translator briefly had a local operation in Salinas, including a news bureau, which was closed in a cost-cutting move in 1992.

On February 8, 2010, the station went dark for technical reasons. The station returned to the air on March 11, 2010. On March 10, 2011, the license was canceled by mistake of the FCC. On April 8, NBC filed an Engineering STA and a Petition for Reconsideration to restore the station. The STA was granted on April 18, 2011. On May 8, the Petition for Reconsideration was granted and the license was reinstated.

On December 3, 2013, the FCC approved a request by NBCUniversal to convert the analog low-power station to digital, as a translator of KMUV-LP, the local Telemundo affiliate owned by the News-Press & Gazette Company.

In 2014, the station became a primary affiliate of Cozi TV, listed in FCC records as a translator of NBC owned-and-operated KNTV, which airs Cozi TV on a subchannel.

In October 2019, K15CU-D added TeleXitos as a second digital subchannel.

== Subchannels ==
The station's signal is multiplexed:

Subchannels of K15CU-D
Channel	Res.	Short name	Programming
15.1	1080i	Cozi	Cozi TV
15.2	480i	TeleX	TeleXitos
15.3	480i	AmCrime	NBC True CRMZ
15.4	480i	Oxygen	Oxygen
