= Scott McGrew =

American journalist

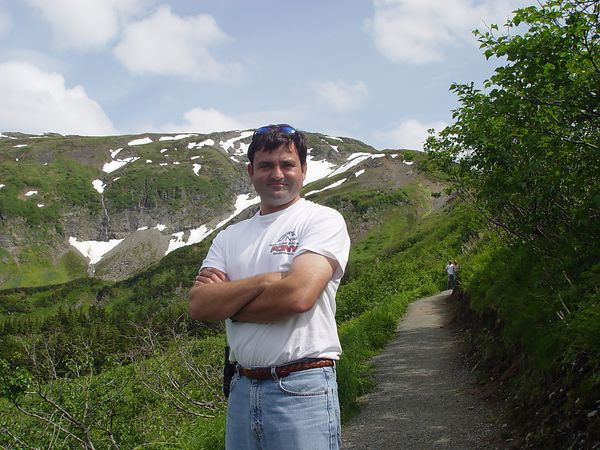
- Born: September 26, 1967 (age 57)
- Education: Glenbrook North High School
- Alma mater: Iowa State University (BA)
- Occupation: Journalist
- Spouse: Kristen Hansen (m. 1992–2014)

Scott McGrew (born September 26, 1967 in Lincoln, Nebraska) is an American reporter on television and radio.

He works at the NBC owned television station KNTV where he hosts Press:Here, a weekly roundtable discussion panel featuring technology reporters in conversation with Silicon Valley CEO's. The program has been described as "Meet the Press for entrepreneurs", and is broadcast on Sunday mornings in the San Francisco market and airs in Dallas, Chicago, New York City, Washington DC, and Los Angeles on NBC Nonstop.

McGrew also works for the San Francisco-based sports radio station KNBR. and occasionally contributes to the John Batchelor radio show on WABC in New York City.

McGrew was named as one of four "favorite TV anchors" by the San Francisco Chronicle pop-culture critic Peter Hartlaub, who described McGrew as an "excellent communicator, he’s prepared, he works hard and he knows what he’s talking about without being a know-it-all".

McGrew is noted for the first interview with Apple founder Steve Wozniak after the company first revealed CEO Steve Jobs's illness would cause him to step aside and was the first reporter to write of the suicide death of US Marine Harry Lew following severe hazing in Afghanistan. McGrew is also one of the few living reporters to have witnessed an execution by firing squad in the death of John Albert Taylor in Utah and accompanied United States Air Force F-16s as they flew combat air patrol to deny air access to potential targets in San Francisco following the September 11 Attacks.

He is also the inspiration for the fictional reporter "Scotty Ryan" in the novel Perfect on Paper by Maria Murnane.
