= KSTS =

Television station in San Jose, California

- San Jose–San Francisco–; Oakland, California; United States
- City: San Jose, California
- Channels: Digital: 19 (UHF); Virtual: 48
- Branding: Telemundo 48; Telemundo Área de la Bahía ("Telemundo Bay Area"); Noticiero Telemundo 48; Noticiero Telemundo California (5:30 p.m.)

Programming
- Affiliations: 48.1: Telemundo; 11.3: NBC; for others, see § Subchannels

Ownership
- Owner: Telemundo Station Group; (NBC Telemundo License LLC)
- Sister stations: KNTV, NBC Sports Bay Area, NBC Sports California

History
- First air date: May 31, 1981
- Former channel numbers: Analog: 48 (UHF, 1981–2009); Digital: 49 (UHF, until 2020)
- Former affiliations: Independent (1981–1989)

Technical information
- Licensing authority: FCC
- Facility ID: 64987
- ERP: 500 kW
- HAAT: 703 m (2,306 ft)
- Transmitter coordinates: 37°29′57″N 121°52′20″W
- Translator(s): KNTV-DT 48.3 (11.3 VHF) San Jose

Links
- Public license information: Public file; LMS
- Website: www.telemundoareadelabahia.com

KSTS (channel 48) is a television station licensed to San Jose, California, United States, serving as the San Francisco Bay Area outlet for the Spanish-language network Telemundo. It is owned and operated by the network's Telemundo Station Group division (itself a subsidiary of NBCUniversal).

Under common ownership with NBC outlet KNTV (channel 11) and regional sports networks NBC Sports Bay Area and NBC Sports California, both KSTS and KNTV share studio facilities on North 1st Street in the North San Jose Innovation District; KSTS's transmitter is located on Mount Allison, and two of its subchannels are also broadcast from the KNTV tower on San Bruno Mountain.

KSTS was established in 1981 to provide subscription television service in the South Bay and Santa Clara Valley. The STV programming ended in 1983, and the station mostly became noted for specialty programming about business and computers as well as some ethnic programs. Telemundo purchased the station in 1987, giving the Bay Area a second station focusing on Spanish-language programming and a second choice for Spanish-language local news.

== History ==
=== Early years ===
On March 29, 1978, the Federal Communications Commission (FCC) granted National Group Television a construction permit to build a new television station on channel 48 in San Jose. The permit took the call letters KQWT before becoming KSTS on January 2, 1979. John Douglas, the principal owner of National Group Television, attempted for more than a year to secure network affiliation for channel 48, but neither CBS nor NBC wanted to cannibalize their San Francisco affiliates. The station first signed on the air on May 31, 1981, as an independent station. The station's commercial programming included business programs, including a local program called Business Today, as well as old off-network shows. More daytime hours were filled by the then-new Financial News Network after it launched in November 1981.

At night, the station originally carried subscription television (STV) programming supplied by Satellite Television & Associated Resources (STAR TV) of Santa Monica; STAR had acquired the franchise from Universal Subscription Television three months prior to launch, a factor that delayed the new station's launch. STAR, which was not ready even after the delayed launch, bought the Super Time STV service on KTSF and relaunched it as STAR TV that September; the company promised to simulcast its STV programs on both stations for a year. Channel 48 broadcast its first subscription programs on November 8. The service ended in June after STAR became unable to pay KSTS; the loss of this revenue prompted the cancellation of Business Today and several layoffs. It would be replaced by a unique STV offering known as International Network Television, which consisted of three program tiers: two hours a night of Japanese-language shows, another two hours of Chinese-language programming, and a late-night adult film block. This generated enough business to allow the station to rehire two previously laid off employees.

The STV service, with just 3,000 subscribers in February 1983, ended on September 1. The station then added Chinese-language shows in prime time and additional brokered programming, including several shows on the young computer industry. The Thursday night Affordable Computer Hotline, channel 48's highest-rated show, was one of three devoted to the topic and cemented KSTS's place as "The Computer Connection". The station also rebroadcast the 1984 shareholders meeting of Apple Computer, where the Macintosh was introduced, as the company had been unable to accommodate all those who wanted to attend. However, when must-carry provisions were struck down, KSTS disappeared from several San Francisco-market cable systems; the manager of Viacom Cablevision systems in Marin County said that channel 48 had "phenomenally low ratings". The vast majority of its programming continued to be related to business and computing, as well as sports, wine, and photography, passions linked to its upscale audience. Further, the station aired foreign-language programming in Filipino and Vietnamese, among others, from independent producers.

=== Telemundo acquisition ===
In 1987, after several members of National Group Television desired to sell, Douglas sold KSTS to Telemundo Group, Inc., which operated the fledgling Telemundo Spanish-language network, for $17 million. At the insistence of network executive Paul Niedermayer, who had been instrumental in the 1985 launch of KVEA in the Los Angeles area, the network bypassed KCNS channel 38 to buy the station in San Jose, which at the time was home to 35 percent of the Hispanics in the Bay Area. The station, however, was not Spanish around the clock even after the sale. As late as 1990, locally produced programs in Portuguese and Persian were airing on KSTS. An effort at regional expansion began in 1990 when K15CU "KCU", a KSTS translator, began broadcasting in Salinas.

In October 1990, half of KSTS's 18 employees went on strike in protest of low pay and poor working conditions. The week-long strike, which resulted in temporary suspensions of the station's 6 p.m. newscast and the outright cancellation of its 11 p.m. news, resulted in the station staff unionizing with the International Brotherhood of Electrical Workers and agreeing to a contract in 1992.

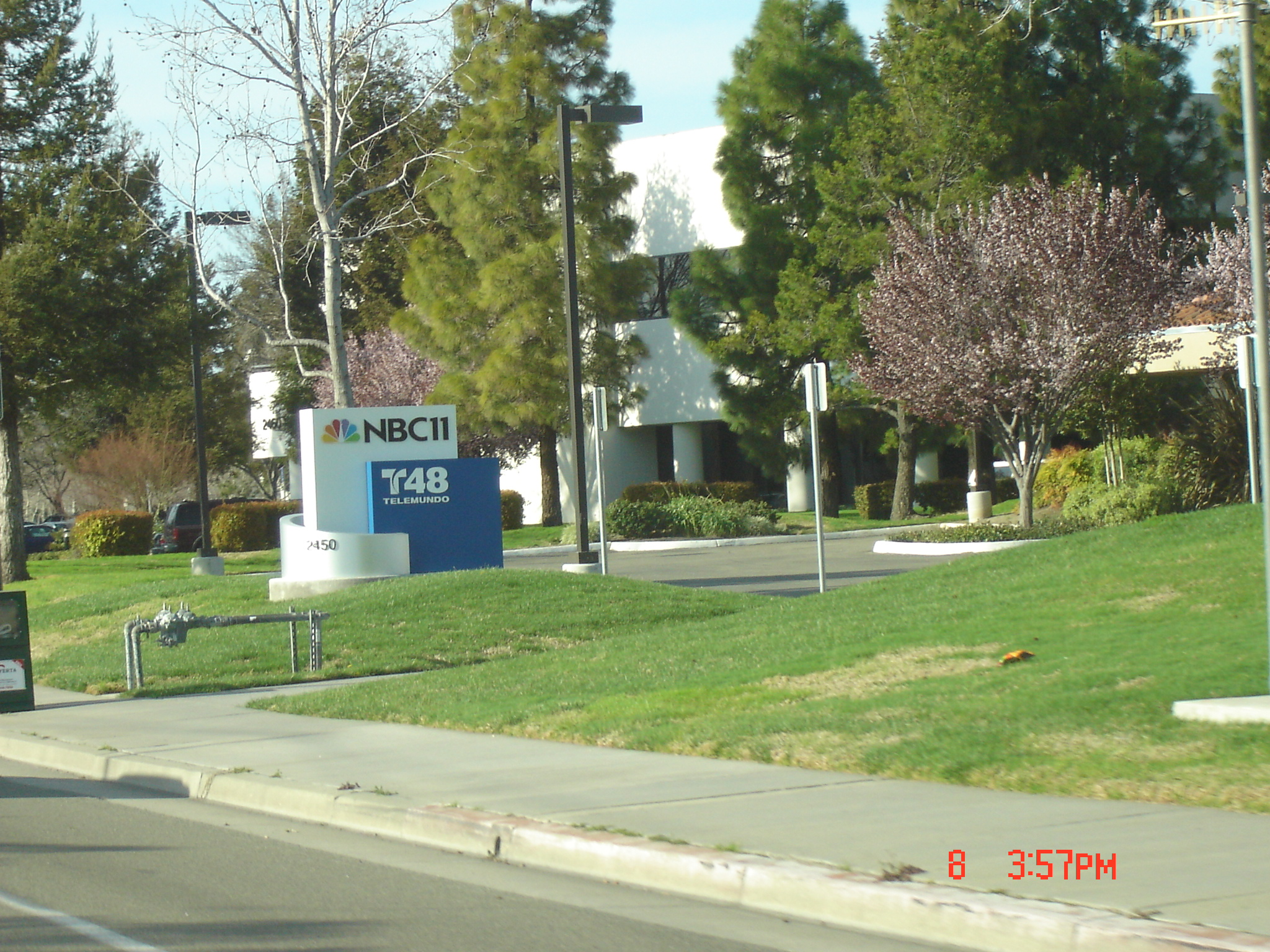
The KNTV-KSTS studios on First Street in San Jose

The acquisition of Telemundo by NBC in 2002 came at the same time the network bought San Jose's KNTV and turned it into an NBC owned-and-operated station. Both stations moved from their separate facilities—KSTS from its site on Bering Drive—to a new building on First Street.

== News operation ==
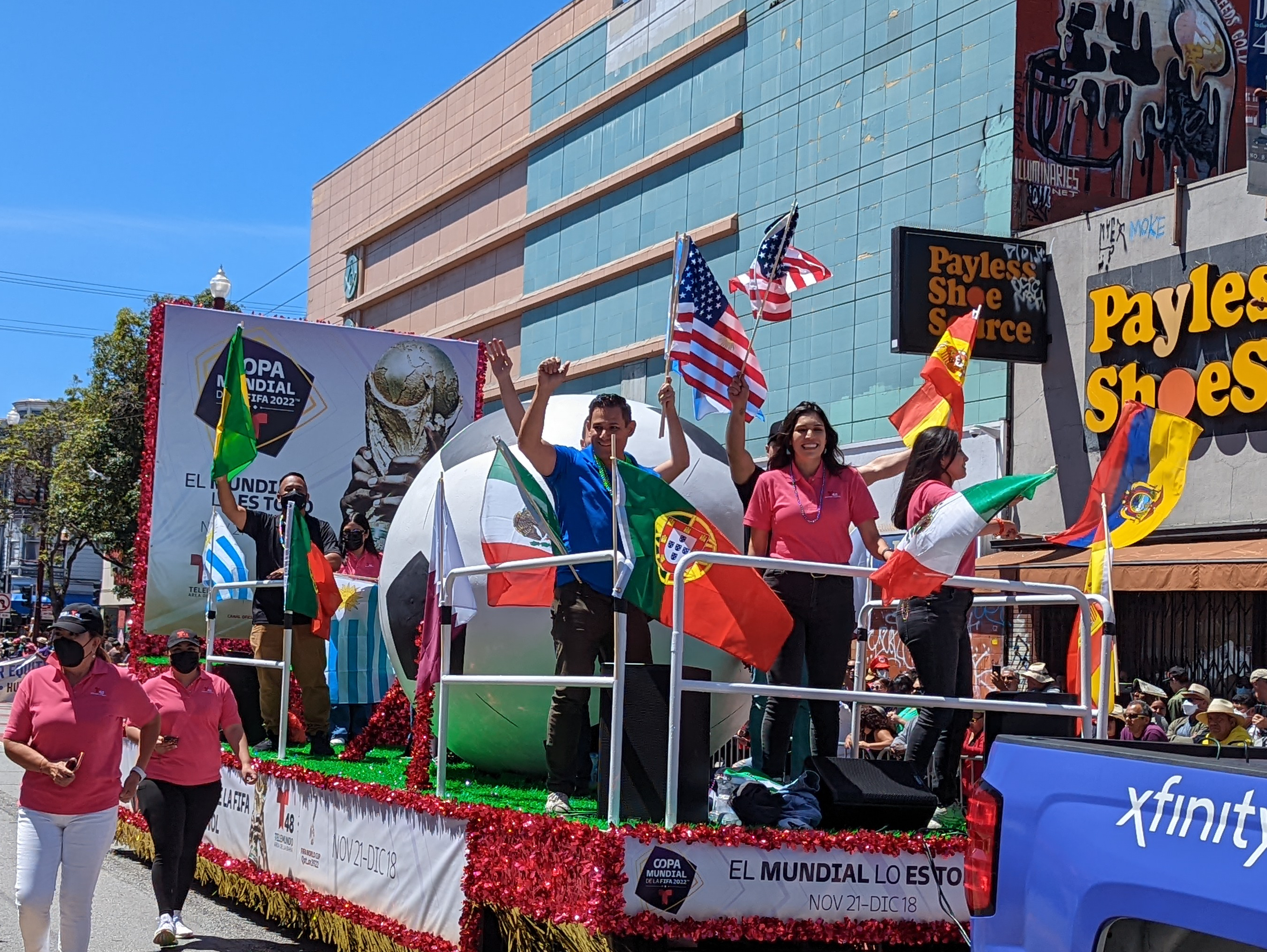
A Telemundo 48 float at Carnaval San Francisco 2022

In 1988, KSTS launched its news department with the debut of a half-hour 6 p.m. newscast, which was originally co-anchored by Celina Rodriguez and Dante Betteo; both left in 1999. The program proved successful, which resulted in the station later adding a half-hour 11 p.m. newscast. This was canceled after the 1990 strike and was not reinstated until 1997. In 1999, KSTS hired model Mónica Mesones to present the weather, resulting in controversy over the selection.

KSTS expanded its news programming in 2001, launching a morning newscast, Noticiero 48 Esta Mañana, and a mid-morning newscast, Noticiero 48 Al Mediodía, anchored by Blanca Garza and Santiago Aburto. These were canceled in 2004. At this time, César Bayona and Mariate Ramos anchored the 6 p.m. and 11 p.m. newscasts. 2006 saw the dismantling of the local news operation and the creation of a regional news operation to serve the western United States as part of the NBCUni 2.0 cost-cutting initiative. This was later reversed, and local news production was restored at KSTS in 2010. On February 27, 2012, KSTS became the first Spanish language television station in the Bay Area to begin broadcasting its local newscasts in high definition.

There was a series of news expansions at Telemundo in 2014, which included KSTS. A second attempt at a morning newscast, titled Noticiero Telemundo 48 Primera Edición, began in June, and in November, KSTS launched a 5:30 p.m. newscast as part of a national news expansion; a 10 a.m. newscast also was added to the schedule at this time. Additionally, KSTS received a new set, began producing its own weather segments locally, launched a local Telemundo Responde consumer investigative franchise, added 20 additional staffers to its news department, and began a deeper sharing of resources, including the public affairs program Comunidad del Valle, with KNTV.

Effective June 27, 2016, the morning and 10 a.m. newscasts were canceled in order to begin the production of weekend editions of the 6 p.m. and 11 p.m. newscasts beginning July 2.

== Technical information ==
=== Subchannels ===
KSTS's transmitter is located on Mount Allison. The station's signal is multiplexed:

Subchannels of KSTS
Subchannel	Res.	Short name	Programming
48.1	1080i	KSTS-HD	Telemundo
48.2	480i	TeleX	TeleXitos
48.5	480i	CRIMES	NBC True CRMZ
48.6	480i	Oxygen	Oxygen
11.3	1080i	KNTV-HD	NBC (KNTV)
11.4	480i	COZI-TV	Cozi TV (KNTV)

Simulcast of subchannels of another station

Between them, KNTV and KSTS broadcast the same five services (48.3 and 48.4 on the KNTV multiplex simulcast 48.1 and 48.2 on the KSTS multiplex and vice versa for KNTV), though Oxygen is only broadcast by KSTS.

=== Analog-to-digital conversion ===
KSTS shut down its analog signal, on UHF channel 48, on June 12, 2009, as part of the federally mandated transition from analog to digital television, and continued broadcasting in digital on channel 49, using virtual channel 48.

The station was repacked from channel 49 to 19 in 2020.
