= Garvin Thomas =

- Education: Boston College
- Occupation: Television journalist
- Television: KNTV NBC Bay Area; Reporter/Anchor (2004–present); KABC ABC Los Angeles; Reporter (Jan 2004 – Jun 2004); WHDH NBC Boston; Reporter (1997–2002); WCCO CBS Minneapolis-St. Paul; Reporter (1992–1997); World Monitor; Associate Producer (1989–1992)

Garvin Thomas Snell, known professionally by his screen name Garvin Thomas is a television journalist currently with NBC Bay Area, KNTV, in the San Francisco Bay Area. He is a reporter, photographer, editor, and sometimes fill-in anchor. He is in charge of the Bay Area Proud franchise, which "profiles the people, the groups, and the companies making the Bay Area, and the world, a better place to live." Prior to joining NBC Bay Area, Thomas had worked in Boston, Minneapolis, Los Angeles and overseas in Berlin, Germany.

== Education ==
Garvin grew up in Yarmouth Port, Massachusetts, and graduated from Dennis-Yarmouth Regional High School in 1984. He then went on to pursue his degree at Boston College, where he majored in Germanic Studies and graduated with a Bachelor of Arts in 1988. He also attended the Universitat Konstanz in Konstanz, Germany, for one year.

== Professional career ==
His stories are produced under KNTV's banner.

Since debuting the Bay Area Proud franchise in 2013, Garvin has produced more than 500 stories. Some highlights among those are stories about a woman with a terminal cancer diagnosis being given a dream wedding, a 12-year-old who created a low-cost Braille printer out of Lego, and an Oakland man using illegally dumped trash to create small homes for the homeless.

Thomas has experience throughout multiple aspects of television journalism. According to his bio, he "started out at NBC Bay Area as a general assignment reporter, but his responsibilities and skills have grown over the years." He is versatile as a writer, reporter, photographer, editor and fill-in anchor. He "also shoots and edits all his own stories."

== Career history ==
Thomas has more than two decades of experience working in television news, and has worked in Boston (on two separate occasions), Berlin, Minneapolis and Los Angeles. He joined NBC Bay Area in 2004.

Previously, he worked with KABC Los Angeles for a short time in early 2004, WHDH in Boston for five years, and WCCO in Minneapolis, MN for five years.

He was also involved in Monitor Broadcasting in Berlin, Germany, where he was the Associate Producer for World Monitor.

== Awards ==
Garvin has won multiple national, regional, and local awards for both his reporting and photography. Among these awards are the 2013 Sigma Delta Chi Award for feature reporting, a 1st and 2nd place in the 2015 National Press Photographers Association Best of Photojournalism competition, and eight regional Emmy awards.

He has won numerous other awards as well:

- 2025 Northern California Emmy Award: Writer
- 2021 Northern California Emmy Award: Video Journalist – Single Shift
- 2020 Northern California Emmy Award: Video Journalist – No Time Limit
- 2019 Northern California Emmy Award: Writer
- 2019 Northern California Emmy Award: Video Journalist – No Time Limit
- 2018 Northern California Emmy Award: General Assignment Report
- 2017 Edward R. Murrow Award, Region 2, Writing
- 2016 Northern California Emmy Award: Writer
- 2016 Northern California Emmy Award: Video Journalist – No Time Limit
- 2016 National Press Photographers Association 2015 Best Of Photojournalism 1st place, Solo Video Journalist
- 2016 Edward R. Murrow Award, Region 2, Writing
- 2016 Gabriel Award – Short Feature
- 2015 Northern California Emmy Award: Video Journalist – No Time Limit
- 2015 National Press Photographers Association 2015 Best Of Photojournalism 1st and 2nd place, Solo Video Journalist – Feature
- 2015 Edward R. Murrow Award, Region 2 – Writing
- 2014 Gabriel Award – Short Feature
- 2014 Northern California Emmy Award: Video Journalist – No Time Limit
- 2013 Society of Professional Journalists Sigma Delta Chi Award – Feature Reporting (Markets 1–50)
- 2013 Northern California Emmy Award: Feature News Report – Light Series
- 2013 Northern California Emmy Award: Video Journalist – No Time Limit
- 2010 San Francisco Bay Area Press Photographers Association: Best Sports Photography
- 2009 San Francisco Bay Area Press Photographers Association Award: Best Feature Photography
- 2007 Mark Twain Award: Reporter of the Year
- 2007 Mark Twain Award: Best Serious Feature
- 2005 Mark Twain Award (formerly APTRA): Best Light Feature
- 2004 Northern California Emmy Award: Best Serious Feature News Report
- 2004 Associated Press Television and Radio Association Award: Best Serious Feature
- 2000 New England Emmy Award: Outstanding Spot News
- 1999 New England Emmy Award: Outstanding Achievement – News Reporting
- 1997 Minnesota Associated Press Award: Best Sports Feature
- 1997 Peabody Award: WCCO Mentoring Team Station Project
- 1994 Alfred I. Dupont Award: WCCO Dimension Unit
- 1993 Chicago/Midwest Emmy Award: Best News Special

== Personal life ==
In December 2002, Garvin and his wife, Karen, quit their jobs as news reporters at Boston area TV stations to spend a year travelling the world. The Cape Cod Times published a story about their trip prior to their departure, and detailed the preparations that went into the trip. Their website chronicling the journey says,

On December 1st, 2002 Garvin and Karen headed off on a once in a lifetime adventure. We left our jobs, gave up our apartment, and put our stuff in storage in order to backpack around the world. One year, 6 continents, 17 countries, and countless miles later we returned to the United States.

Currently, Garvin and his wife live in the Santa Cruz Mountains with their three children.
