= Satellite Television & Associated Resources =

American subscription television company

Satellite Television & Associated Resources (STAR) was an American operator of subscription television (STV) systems. Owned by businessman Byron Lasky and headquartered in Santa Monica, California, the company operated services under the "Star" and "Star TV" banners in markets including San Francisco, Boston, and New Orleans, which either broadcast in scrambled form on UHF television stations or via multipoint distribution service (MDS) microwave channels. With $12 million in liabilities, the company was forced into Chapter 7 bankruptcy in 1983 and its assets closed and sold to other companies.

== History ==
In 1979, STAR obtained federal licenses to operate microwave systems in 40 cities, including Richmond, Virginia, and Louisville, Kentucky. Programming was provided by Hollywood Home Theatre's Fanfare service, based in Houston. By September 1980, when the firm completed an initial public offering, STAR was operating in Richmond, Louisville, Birmingham, Alabama, and Norfolk, Virginia; a fifth MDS system in New Orleans was added between then and May 1981, and it also operated a sixth franchise in Los Angeles. Shares traded on NASDAQ under the ticker symbol SATV.

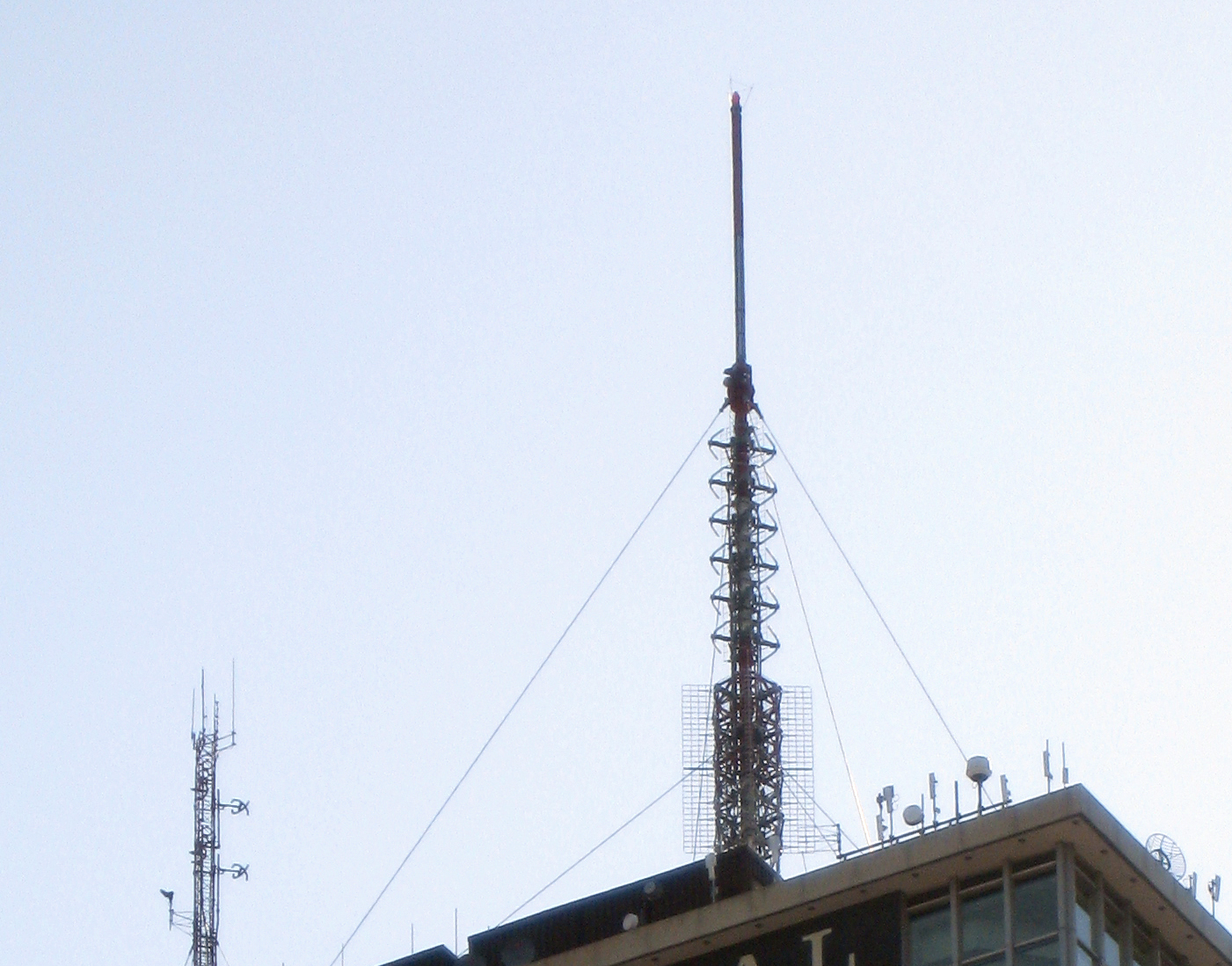
The original antenna for Boston's WQTV, which a STAR affiliate acquired in 1981 alongside the purchase of its STV business

In January 1981, STAR acquired two unused subscription television franchises from Universal Subscription Television of Burlingame, California, a subsidiary of Canadian firm CanWest Capital Corporation, for $1.9 million—$1.1 million for the rights to a service on WGPR-TV in Detroit and $800,000 for the franchise for KSTS in San Jose, California; it also purchased $2.1 million in equipment from Universal. The Detroit service had not been built by Universal and never came to fruition under STAR, likely because there were already two STV services on air in that city. Later in the year, it spent $20.5 million to acquire Universal's only going STV venture, "Starcase" on Boston's WQTV (channel 68), and another $600,000 for the station itself in a subsequent transaction.

By mid-1982, generally the peak of STV operation nationally, STAR's Boston service had 52,000 subscribers with another 24,000 in the San Francisco market (between KSTS and KTSF, where it took over from that station's prior "Super Time" offering by acquiring it in November 1981). However, the company was bleeding cash. In 1981, it had lost $7 million, and in mid-1982, it sold its five MDS systems, having exhausted its bank lines that spring.

Satellite Television and Associated Resources would be one of the first and highest-profile failures in the STV industry, even after the attempt to raise capital by selling the MDS operations and focusing on the two broadcast STV operations. On January 4, 1983, the general manager of Star TV in San Francisco informed his 70 employees that it would be acquired by Willamette Subscription Television of Portland, Oregon, which had been operating an ON TV-branded service on KECH-TV serving that city; at the time, the company was losing 750 customers a month, and the general manager reported that a Chapter 11 bankruptcy filing was imminent. However, by March, the company was still trying to sell the operation. In Boston, STAR sold its assets to its direct competitor: Preview, which had been broadcasting on WSMW in Worcester, Massachusetts. At the end of January, STAR's 23,000 remaining subscribers got Preview program guides for February; the end for Star came on the night of February 12, when customers were confronted with a graphic slide after a second mortgage holder foreclosed on the operation and sold its assets privately. Preview bought the subscriber list and temporarily simulcast most of its programming on both channels 68 and 27 until it could switch Star's subscribers to Preview equipment.

Our view of the STV business is that it has gone down the drain.

— Robert L. Oppenheim, president of STAR, on his company's troubles in March 1983

In early March 1983, Robert L. Oppenheim, STAR's president, acknowledged that the firm had $12 million in liabilities; while it had hoped to shed liabilities with the MDS system sales, it was still losing subscribers "hand over fist", attributed to the growth of cable systems and the recession then affecting the economy, which caused company-owned systems to start losing subscribers before they ever broke even because most costs were fixed. At the end of March 1983, Satellite Television & Associated Resources was forced into Chapter 7 bankruptcy by three movie studios and Admarketing, an advertising company in Los Angeles. The latter was the firm's largest creditor, owed more than $750,000. One legal action related to the company continued into 1984; it unsuccessfully petitioned the Supreme Court of the United States to hear an appeal of an appeals court ruling in which it had charged without success that Continental Cablevision in Richmond, by requiring apartment companies to wire their own complexes or pay Continental and enter into exclusive contracts with the company, stifled competition.
