= Mónica Mesones =

Uruguayan model

Mónica Mesones, a native of Montevideo, Uruguay, is a model who started modeling at the age of thirteen. She has modeled in Europe, the United States and Asia and appeared as a Playmate in the Spanish language editions of Playboy and Playboy newsstand specials in the U.S.

She went on to be the weather and entertainment news presenter for the 6pm and 11pm newscast at KSTS, a Telemundo affiliate in northern California, then co- presented the national news show Calles al Desnudo on the Azteca América network in Los Angeles. She later appeared as co-host of Me Caso Contigo a reality/game show on Ch22 also in Los Angeles. She can be seen interviewing celebrities on the red carpet of award shows and movie premieres in Hollywood for Wireimage.com.
