= Jessica Aguirre =

Cuban-American television journalist

- Born: Aventura, Florida, U.S.
- Education: University of Miami
- Occupation: Television news anchor
- Awards: Emmy

Jessica Aguirre is a Cuban-American television journalist.

== Biography ==
Jessica Aguirre is a first generation Cuban-American, the daughter of immigrants. She grew up in Florida.

Aguirre began her broadcasting career while a student at the University of Miami. Jessica began her career working for Univision's local owned and operated television station, WLTV as assignment desk assistant in 1988 she became a reporter for the network's first lifestyle news magazine, TV Mujer, (TV Woman), before she jumped to WCIX-TV (now WFOR-TV), the CBS owned-and-operated Miami station in the following year. Three years later, she was hired as a general assignment reporter for Fox affiliate WSVN. She was promoted to co-anchor for the station's 10:00 pm edition of 7 News, which also featured a young Jillian Warry reporting the weather.

Aguirre then made her way to Los Angeles, California, where she worked at ABC owned-and-operated station KABC-TV as a reporter and anchor. After her work in Los Angeles, in the mid-1990s, Aguirre came to the San Francisco Bay Area where she was hired by KGO-TV Channel 7.

After leaving her KGO position, Aguirre was hired as an anchor for NBC-owned-and-operated station KNTV Channel 11. She currently anchors the station's 6:00 pm and 11:00 pm newscasts, as well as hosting the Emmy-nominated NBC Class Action.

Aguirre is a member of the National Academy of Television Arts and Sciences.

== Reportage ==
Aguirre has reported from Cuba, and has covered Hurricane Andrew and the Oklahoma City bombing. She has covered race riots in Miami, and prison riots in Atlanta and Louisiana. She has reported from GITMO, the prison at Guantanamo Bay and from London, England on Princess Diana.

== Awards ==
Aguirre has won Emmy awards for her reporting on migrant workers and child molestation, while working in Los Angeles and Miami.

== Charity work ==
Aguirre supports the League of United Latin American Citizens, the Mexican American Legal Defense and Educational Fund, the Raphael House shelter, and El Hogar De Los Ninos, a Bay Area non-profit which provides education for children in Nicaragua.

== Personal life ==
Aguirre is fluent in Spanish. She lives with her two daughters.
