= Lisa Kim =

- Born: Elizabeth Lee Kim-Lohmann; May 1962 (age 64); Rockville, Maryland
- Education: Medill School of Journalism
- Occupation: News anchor
- Employer: NBC
- Spouse: Watson M. Lohmann, Jr.

Elizabeth Lee Kim-Lohmann (born May 1962), known professionally as Lisa Kim, is a former television news anchor for an NBC-affiliated station in the San Francisco Bay Area and a former news anchor for MSNBC.

== Early life and education ==
A native of Rockville, Maryland, Kim earned a bachelor's degree in 1984 and a master's degree in 1985 from the Medill School of Journalism at Northwestern University.

== Professional career ==
Kim began her broadcast journalism career in Santa Barbara, California. She joined KGTV-TV in San Diego in 1986, staying there for more than eight years.

In January 1995, Kim joined WBBM-TV in Chicago as a general assignment reporter and a morning news cut-ins anchor. Kim had worked at WBBM-TV as a desk assistant while in journalism school.

In mid-1996, Kim resigned from WBBM to join MSNBC as an anchor and host.

Kim left MSNBC in 1999 to join KNTV in San Jose. She announced on December 9, 2010, on the 5:00 evening news that she would be leaving KNTV in San Jose.

== Personal ==
Kim is married to Watson M. Lohmann, Jr. and has two children. She lives in Menlo Park, California.
