= San Jose Holiday Parade =

American seasonal parade

The San Jose Holiday Parade is in San Jose, California. The parade was included in the "Top 25 Parades in America" by the International Festival and Events Association and USA Today. Celebrities and famous locals appear as Grand Marshals and bands from across America participate in the parade.

== History ==
The San Jose Holiday Parade tradition began in 1981 at the opening of the Christmas in the Park display at Plaza de Cesar Chavez, in Downtown San José. In the first year the parade consisted of a couple of fire engines, City of San José vehicles and Santa.

The next year, the parade became the Christmas in the Park Parade. It began on Park Avenue and circled around Plaza de Cesar Chavez. The parade featured a handful of units including the San Jose State University Spartan Marching Band, a couple of floats and children’s groups. This tradition continued for a number of years until the parade became too large just circling the park. The 2008 parade is on December 7.

In 1987, KNTV, San José’s network affiliate television station, began to broadcast the parade throughout the Bay Area. In 1993, the Christmas in the Park Parade became the San Jose Holiday Parade. In 1994, the parade began an expansion, showcasing California’s third largest city. Giant helium balloons, professionally made floats and marching musical units from the rest of North America joined the line of march.

In 2000, the parade was named "One of the Top 25 Parades in America" by the International Festival and Events Association and USA Today. In 2006, International Festival and Event professionals honored the San Jose Holiday Parade with the Grand Pinnacle Award. This award is presented annually to recognize the overall top international event.

The 2010 parade was held on December 5. The honorary Grand Marshals were two World Series champs from the San Francisco Giants.
