= Tema da Vitória =

1981 instrumental song by Eduardo Souto Neto

Song by Roupa Nova
- Released: 1981
- Genre: pop rock
- Length: 4:53
- Songwriter: Eduardo Souto Neto

"Tema da Vitória" (lit. 'Victory Theme') is an instrumental song composed by Eduardo Souto Neto specially for Formula One broadcasts on Rede Globo.

== History ==
"Tema da Vitória" was suggested by Aloysio Legey, the director of Formula One transmissions for Rede Globo. The song was recorded in 1981 by the Brazilian band Roupa Nova, to be used as the soundtrack of victories in the Brazilian Grand Prix, regardless of the winner's nationality, transmitted by Rede Globo. The song was first performed with the victory of Nelson Piquet in the 1983 Brazilian Grand Prix. The next year, the song was performed for Alain Prost's victory in the 1984 Brazilian Grand Prix.

It was only in 1986 that the song started to be used for every victory by a Brazilian driver. The song marked Nelson Piquet's third championship in 1987 and Ayrton Senna's championships in 1988, 1990 and 1991.

For seven years, the song was not played on Rede Globo due to the lack of victories by Brazilian drivers, between the 1993 Australian Grand Prix won by Ayrton Senna and the 2000 German Grand Prix won by Rubens Barrichello.

In FIFA World Cup 1994 and 2002, the song was played the first time for Brazil national football team victory.

For the 2004 and 2008 Summer Olympic Games, Rede Globo used a version of the song that was merged with parts of the Brazilian national anthem, which was played during the broadcasts when a Brazilian team or athlete would win a medal.

In 2006, the song was played the first time for Felipe Massa for his victory in the 2006 Turkish Grand Prix. Three years later, it featured a different arrangement for Barrichello's victory in the 2009 European Grand Prix, which marked Brazil's 100th Formula One win.

At UFC 198, UFC Heavyweight Champion Fabricio Werdum used the song as his entrance music.

On March 29, 2014, Ron "Bumblefoot" Thal, guitar player on American band Guns N' Roses, performed "Tema da Vitória" as an opening for "Don't Cry" at a concert inside the Anhembi Convention Center Arena in São Paulo.

In 2015, the song was performed by Lulu Santos, accompanied by an orchestra conducted by João Carlos Martins, during a segment of the television special celebrating the 50th anniversary of Rede Globo. This segment also featured sports journalist Galvão Bueno and several former Brazilian athletes, alongside a retrospective montage highlighting memorable sports broadcasts from the network’s history.

For the 2016 and 2020 Summer Olympic Games, the song was played the first time for Brazil national under-23 football team victory.

When skier Lucas Pinheiro Braathen won Brazil's first ever Winter Olympics medal at the 2026 Olympic Winter Games, the organization of the games played the "Tema da Vitória" at the competition's venue to celebrate his victory. Sportv, Rede Globo's Brazilian pay television sports network, did the same on their broadcast.
