= Jeff Ranieri =

American television meteorologist

- Occupation: Meteorologist
- Employer: NBC Universal

Jeff Ranieri (born in 1978) is a Chief Meteorologist for NBC O&O station KNTV in San Jose, California. Ranieri previously reported for NBC NEWS on Early Today, and MSNBC weekday mornings & afternoons. He was also an NBC Weather Plus Meteorologist for Weekend Today Saturday. Frequently during weather events he reported for Nightly News and the Today Show.

Prior to joining NBC in 2004 Ranieri was a forecaster at KCRA in Sacramento, California. Early in his career he also forecasted in Oregon and Florida.

His reporting includes the landfall of Hurricane Katrina from Biloxi, Mississippi, Severe Midwest flooding in 2007, the Super Tuesday tornado outbreak 2008, and historic New England ice storm in December 2008. In 2006 he covered the Winter Olympic Games in Turin, Italy and the Summer Games in Beijing, China.

After NBC Weather Plus dissolved it acquired the Weather Channel. In late 2008 Ranieri merged with the new brand while remaining a meteorologist with NBC NEWS in New York. On May 22, 2009, TVNewser reported that Ranieri left NBC News in New York to join NBC O&O KNTV in the San Francisco Bay Area. This comes after KNTV has laid off several valuable talent as part of the cutting costs. As of June 2010, Ranieri is Chief Meteorologist, and will occasionally be at various places around the SF Bay with live weather, features & interviews. Ranieri holds the American Meteorological Society television seal of approval.
