= KNTV =

Television station in San Jose, California

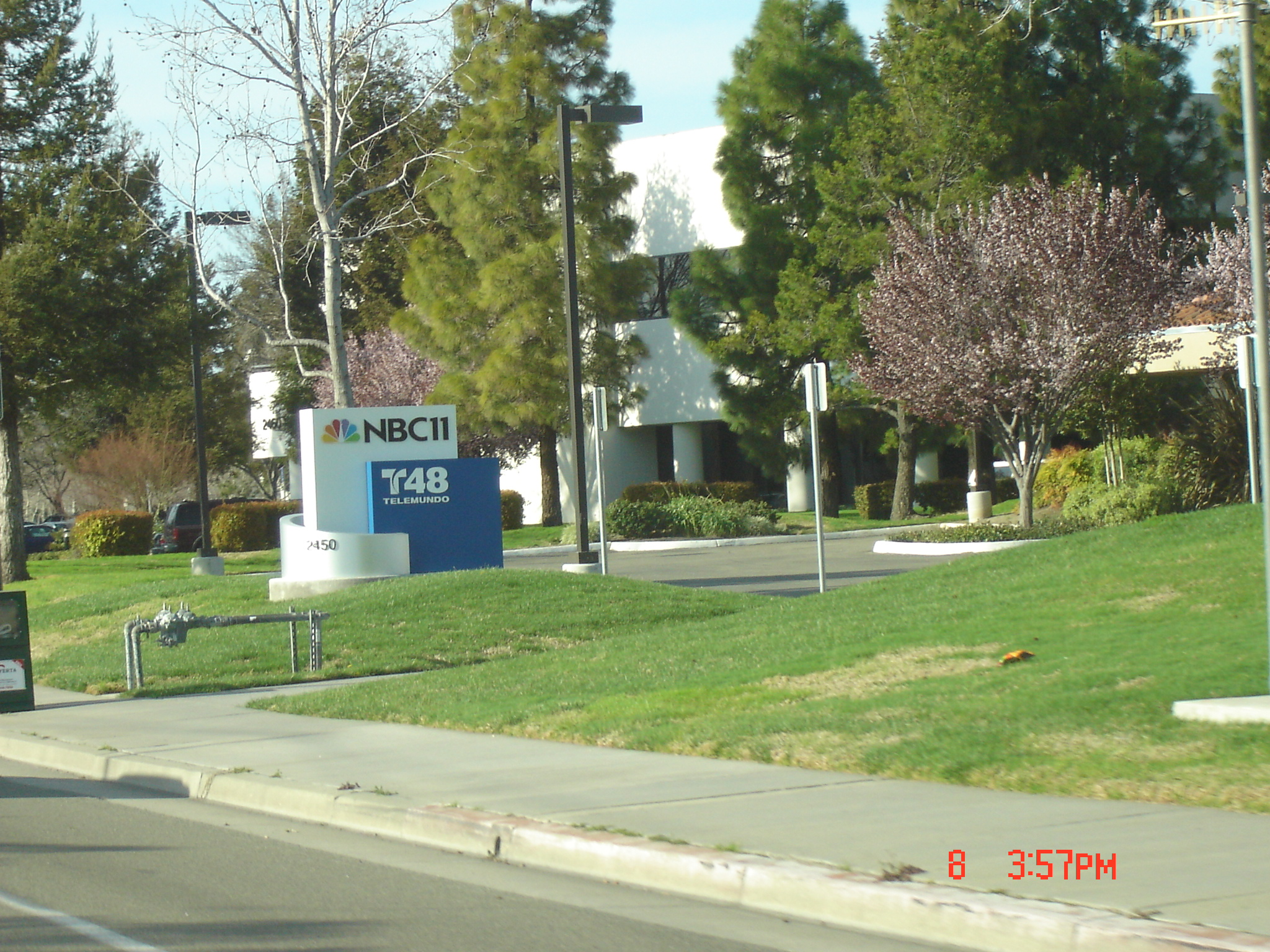
- KNTV and KSTS studios located at 2450 North First Street in San Jose
- San Jose–San Francisco–; Oakland, California; United States
- City: San Jose, California
- Channels: Digital: 13 (VHF); Virtual: 11
- Branding: NBC Bay Area

Programming
- Affiliations: 11.1: NBC; 48.3: Telemundo; for others, see § Subchannels

Ownership
- Owner: NBC Owned Television Stations; (NBC Telemundo License LLC)
- Sister stations: KSTS, NBC Sports Bay Area, NBC Sports California

History
- Founded: April 16, 1954
- First air date: September 12, 1955
- Former channel numbers: Analog: 11 (VHF, 1955–2009); Digital: 12 (VHF, 1999–2020)
- Former affiliations: Independent (1955–1960); ABC (1960–2000); The WB (2000–2001)
- Call sign meaning: None, assigned by the FCC

Technical information
- Licensing authority: FCC
- Facility ID: 35280
- ERP: 95 kW
- HAAT: 419 m (1,375 ft)
- Transmitter coordinates: 37°41′6.5″N 122°26′4.6″W
- Translator(s): KSTS 11.3 (19.3 UHF) San Jose

Links
- Public license information: Public file; LMS
- Website: nbcbayarea.com

KNTV (channel 11, cable channel 3), branded as NBC Bay Area, is a television station licensed to San Jose, California, United States, serving the San Francisco Bay Area. It is owned and operated by the NBC television network through its NBC Owned Television Stations division. Under common ownership with Telemundo outlet KSTS (channel 48) and regional sports networks NBC Sports Bay Area and NBC Sports California, both KNTV and KSTS share studio facilities on North 1st Street in the North San Jose Innovation District, while KNTV's transmitter is located on San Bruno Mountain, and two of its subchannels are also broadcast from the KSTS tower on Mount Allison.

KNTV was established as an independent station in 1955; in 1960, it became an affiliate of ABC as the affiliate of record for Salinas and Monterey, otherwise a separate market. Even though San Francisco had its own ABC television station, KGO-TV, KNTV focused its news and other programming on the Santa Clara Valley. In 1999, ABC paid KNTV to end its affiliation in 2000 in order to allow KGO-TV to serve as the only source of ABC programming in the San Jose area. The station operated as a part-time affiliate of The WB for a year and a half before securing a 10-year affiliation with NBC and then being sold to the network outright. Local news covering the entire Bay Area is produced from the San Jose studios.

== History ==
=== Early years and ABC affiliation (1955–1999) ===
KNTV signed on the air on September 12, 1955, originally operating as an independent station covering the entire north-central California coast from Monterey to San Francisco. It was the first television station in San Jose and was originally operated by Standard Radio and Television Corporation, which was owned by Allen T. Gilliland. The station's studios and offices were located at 645 Park Avenue, a short distance from the Caltrain railroad tracks and adjacent to the Gilliland-owned Sunlite Baking Company in downtown San Jose. Its antenna was originally located on Loma Prieta, some 60 miles (97 km) south of San Francisco. Channel 11 often aired shows from CBS, DuMont and NBC that were respectively turned down by San Francisco's KPIX-TV (channel 5) and KRON-TV (channel 4), as well as some ABC shows that also aired on KGO-TV (channel 7). The station was not viable as an independent, despite the Bay Area's size. The going got even more difficult when Oakland-based KTVU (channel 2) signed on in 1958, and it soon became apparent that the Bay Area was not large enough at the time to support two independent stations.

However, due to KNTV's transmitter and antenna location, its signal could be received fairly well in the nearby areas of Monterey and Salinas; the transmitter was located approximately halfway between San Jose and Monterey. Taking advantage of this, KNTV sought and was granted the ABC affiliation for the Monterey Bay area in 1960, on the condition that the station reduced its transmitter power so as not to overlap with network-owned KGO-TV's signal. Previously, all three networks had been shoehorned onto Salinas-based KSBW-TV (channel 8). KNTV, therefore, became one of the few stations located outside the market it served.

Following the death of Allen T. Gilliland in 1960, ownership of KNTV was held by the executors of his estate, which included son Allen T. Gilliland Jr. The younger Gilliland acquired majority ownership in August 1966 and later operated it as part of Gill Industries, which also controlled San Jose's cable television system. KNTV was highly regarded locally by viewers and seen as a "hometown" station for the South Bay, with news coverage and local commercials reflecting its South Bay roots, rather than focusing almost solely on San Francisco as the other network outlets did. Gill Industries sold KNTV to Norfolk, Virginia–based Landmark Communications in 1978. Twelve years later, Landmark sold the station to a minority-owned firm, Granite Broadcasting.

=== Transition (1999–2001) ===
In 1999, KGO-TV agreed to pay Granite $14 million to stop channel 11 from running ABC programming in 2000, five years before its affiliation contract was scheduled to expire. ABC's corporate parent, The Walt Disney Company, saw the need to expand KGO-TV's exclusive advertising market share into San Jose, and it felt that KNTV was taking away from its potential audience.

That same year, the deYoung family, owners of KRON-TV and the San Francisco Chronicle, put all of its media properties up for sale. NBC, which had been in the midst of renewing its affiliation agreement with KRON-TV, jumped into the bidding. It had been one of the bidders for the channel 4 license in the late 1940s when it wanted a sister television station to complement West Coast flagship KNBC (AM 680, now KNBR), but lost out to Chronicle. The deYoungs had built KRON into one of NBC's strongest affiliates, though NBC had long felt chagrin at KRON's frequent preemptions of network programming. NBC was thought to be the favorite to buy KRON-TV, but in a move that shocked the broadcasting industry, lost a bidding war for the station to Young Broadcasting in November 1999. NBC responded by threatening to yank its programming from KRON unless Young agreed to run it under the conventions of an NBC-owned outlet, including disallowing the station from preempting NBC programs outside of breaking news coverage. The network also made the unprecedented demand that Young pay NBC $10 million annually to carry the network's programming—a form of reverse compensation. Young refused and announced that it would end KRON-TV's 52-year relationship with NBC once its affiliation contract ended in December 2001.

In February 2000, Granite contacted NBC to negotiate an affiliation deal and offered to pay an average of $37 million annually (totaling roughly $362 million over 10 years) for the rights to broadcast NBC programs on KNTV. This agreement was groundbreaking and notable, as KNTV became the first major market affiliate to pay a network for programming, reversing a long-standing model where networks paid affiliates to carry their programming. NBC accepted the deal, which was due to take effect in January 2002. In preparation for this switch, KNTV boosted its signal to reach the entire Bay Area. This increased KNTV's potential audience to more than seven million viewers, including 90% of the Bay Area.

On July 3, 2000, KNTV ended its ABC affiliation after 40 years with the network; it then temporarily carried programming from The WB in a part-time simulcast with then co-owned KBWB-TV (channel 20, now KOFY-TV), which was the full-time WB affiliate for the Bay Area. The move cost the Monterey Bay area an over-the-air ABC affiliate. To compensate for the loss, KGO-TV was then added on cable providers in that market, with certain syndicated programs carried by the station replaced due to syndication exclusivity rules. This did not pose as much of a problem as it may seem due to the very high penetration of cable and satellite in the Monterey Bay area. ABC would not return over-the-air to the area until KSBW began carrying ABC programming on the station's second digital subchannel on April 18, 2011.

In September 2000, Nielsen Media Research reclassified KNTV to the Bay Area DMA. In March 2001, the Federal Communications Commission (FCC) officially recognized KNTV as a Bay Area station, clearing the way for channel 11 to begin identifying as "San Jose–San Francisco–Oakland".

For Granite Broadcasting, the deal with NBC was expensive; the company showed a net loss of $44 million for the first three quarters of 2001, more than double its losses during the same period the previous year. In an attempt to reduce debts, Granite started looking for a buyer for Detroit WB affiliate WDWB in October 2001; that station would not be sold until 2014.

=== As an NBC O&O (2001–present) ===
On December 17, 2001, NBC announced another twist on the deal: it bought KNTV from cash-strapped Granite for $230 million, effectively separating itself from KBWB (which remained under Granite ownership; it was sold in 2018). The network was already in the process of acquiring San Jose-based Telemundo station KSTS and wanted to create a duopoly in the Bay Area. KNTV officially joined NBC at 11:35 p.m. Pacific Time on December 31, 2001. Jay Leno officially welcomed NBC's newest station in a ceremony on The Tonight Show (leading an area-wide 10-second countdown, as the show served as KNTV's first NBC program), followed later that morning by a segment on the Today show in which Al Roker introduced KNTV's anchors. With NBC's move to channel 11, it became the only major network in the Bay Area to switch from one station to another. KNTV is the third Bay Area station to affiliate with NBC, as primary CBS affiliate KPIX-TV had carried the network as a secondary affiliation upon its sign-on in 1948 until KRON debuted the following year. NBC formally took control of KNTV in April 2002. This was not NBC's first attempt at purchasing a station in the Bay Area; a plan to purchase KTVU in 1961 was canceled following antitrust objections from KRON-TV, along with an FCC hearing designation surrounding all applications related to NBC's ownership of radio and television stations in Philadelphia.

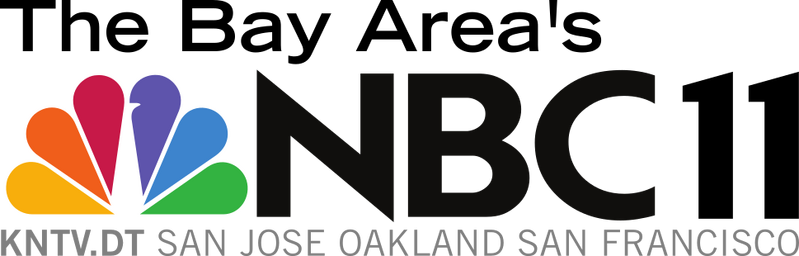
KNTV's logo from September 2002 to July 2008

After the affiliation switch to NBC, Granite switched the station's on-air branding to "NBC 3" to reflect its position on cable channel 3 on nearly every cable provider in the Bay Area. After the sale to NBC, its new ownership addressed issues involving confusion with Sacramento's NBC affiliate, KCRA-TV (which broadcast on channel 3), and rebranded the station as "NBC 11" in September 2002.

Initially as the station built up its newsgathering resources in San Francisco and the East Bay, KNTV newscasts were perceived to be infotainment due to the focus on much more accessible crime and entertainment news, but by late 2002 the newscasts began focusing on Bay Area affairs. The station added on a San Francisco bureau and studio in a 25,000-square-foot (2,300 m^{2}) facility on Battery Street in San Francisco.

During the 2004 Summer Olympics, the station heavily promoted channel 11 through its "illuminating" marketing campaign (stylized as "I11uminating," with the number "11" used in place of the "L" letters).

==== New studios and transmitter ====
In 2004, NBC converted a vacant office space in northern San Jose into a state-of-the-art, all-digital facility for KNTV and KSTS. On December 13 of that year, KNTV moved from its original studios on Park Avenue to the new location. As part of a company-wide environmental initiative (known today as "Green is Universal"), the facility is entirely powered by wind energy. Following its acquisition by NBC, KNTV continued to broadcast from its longtime transmitter location on the summit of Loma Prieta (located between San Jose and Santa Cruz), but did not increase its power to improve signal coverage in San Francisco and Oakland; as a result, the signal could not be seen over the air in much of the Bay Area north of San Mateo County, including much of San Francisco itself. The affiliation and market switches also resulted in many cable providers in the Monterey Bay area either dropping KNTV entirely or blocking its NBC programming under syndication exclusivity guidelines; even so, the signal still overlapped with KSBW.

That all changed on September 12, 2005, when KNTV was able to finally move its transmitter 52 miles (84 km) northwest to San Bruno Mountain, giving it a signal comparable to the Bay Area's other major stations. The move came after years of objection from KRON's owner Young Broadcasting. KRON made numerous filings with the FCC, alleging that thousands of San Jose residents would lose over-the-air coverage of KNTV if it moved closer to San Francisco.

Some San Francisco residents, especially in the Sunset and Richmond districts of the city, still found it difficult to receive an adequate over-the-air signal, because they are shielded from San Bruno Mountain. Most of the other Bay Area stations operate from Sutro Tower, which has a better overall view of San Francisco proper, although at the expense of those in northern San Mateo County, where San Bruno Mountain acts as a shield. However, most of the Bay Area is covered with a strong signal from all of the stations. The year closed, however, with a devastating wildfire at the retired transmitting facility on Loma Prieta. The fire was quickly extinguished on the afternoon of December 31; however, the fire reignited after firefighters had left the scene, and destroyed the former primary analog and digital transmitters, which had only been retired a few months earlier and were in backup status, as well as a variety of other communications equipment.

In January 2007, CNBC moved its Silicon Valley bureau—formerly located at The Wall Street Journal's bureau in Palo Alto—into KNTV/KSTS' San Jose studios. Former KNTV and KRON reporter Jim Goldman is the bureau chief, and the main CNBC reporter covering business stories concerning the Silicon Valley; the set used for daily broadcasts on CNBC occupies part of KNTV's newsroom. In 2008, KNTV changed its on-air branding from "NBC11" to "NBC Bay Area"; the station's website was relaunched on October 16, 2009, as part of a larger revamp of the websites of NBC's entire O&O station group.

In April 2010, KNTV entered into an arrangement with former NBC affiliate KRON-TV to broadcast network programs during instances in which KNTV has to preempt them for special programming such as telecasts of San Francisco Giants games. Incidentally, KRON's owner, Young Broadcasting discussed entering KRON into a shared services agreement with KNTV's owner NBCUniversal, which ultimately never materialized. KRON's default carriage of preempted NBC shows ended in 2012, when KICU-TV (then owned by Cox Media Group as a sister station to KTVU) resumed those duties until the sale of both KICU and KTVU to Fox Television Stations in 2014; preemptions are now handled in-house with a move of NBC programming to KNTV's Cozi TV subchannel. On April 13, 2010, KNTV became the subject of Stephen Colbert's program, The Colbert Report, where Colbert played a clip read by weekend anchor Diane Dwyer on the issue of "unpaid internships". Colbert would eventually use that given clip to set the stage for laughs based on unpaid interns.

In April 2014, a five-alarm fire destroyed the former KNTV complex on Park Avenue; the vacant property had been purchased by the San Jose Redevelopment Agency along with adjacent parcels in the (eventually ill-fated) hopes of attracting a new downtown stadium for the Oakland Athletics.

== Programming ==
Since being purchased by NBCUniversal, KNTV has produced its own programs for both local broadcast and for distribution nationally on the NBC television network and in syndication. Two of KNTV's national and regional programs distributed to NBC stations and the network at large were Tech Now! (a weekly show that debuted on September 19, 1998 under Granite Broadcasting ownership covering tech news and products, hosted by Scott Budman and produced by Scott McGrew and was at one time popular in Ghana) and In Wine Country (a weekly series focusing on the Napa Valley wine community). KNTV is one of ten NBC O&O stations to distribute programs to other stations or to the network itself as of 2021, along with Los Angeles' KNBC, New York City's WNBC, Miami's WTVJ, Hartford's WVIT, Philadelphia's WCAU, Chicago's WMAQ-TV, Dallas' KXAS-TV, San Diego's KNSD and Washington, D.C.'s WRC-TV. The station is also the local broadcaster of the San Jose Holiday Parade each December.

On October 12, 2010, KNTV hosted its first political debate since becoming owned by NBCUniversal. Its 5, 6, and 11 p.m. newscast was broadcast live at San Rafael's Dominican University of California, though the latter newscast were used as a wrap-up of the debate. The debate between California gubernatorial candidates Meg Whitman and Jerry Brown was moderated by NBC News special correspondent Tom Brokaw. This program was simulcast on several other NBC stations within California, including fellow NBC O&Os KNBC and KNSD, as well as on Hearst Television-owned KCRA-TV and KSBW.

=== Past program preemptions and deferrals ===
As an ABC affiliate, KNTV occasionally preempted a few ABC programs. KGO-TV, meanwhile (as a network-owned outlet) aired ABC's entire programming schedule, so this often gave San Jose and Silicon Valley (also known as the "South Bay") area residents a second choice for viewing preempted ABC programming (although reception of KGO in the South Bay tended to have some static without a roof-mounted antenna, because of the relatively far distance from Sutro Tower). In its early years as the new NBC affiliate for the San Francisco Bay Area, KNTV aired NBC's soap opera lineup much later in the afternoon than most affiliates; KRON had done this for years as an NBC affiliate. Soon enough, by July 2009, KNTV fell in line with the network's recommended time slot and aired Days of Our Lives (NBC's remaining afternoon daytime drama) at 1 p.m., before the soap opera moved to NBCUniversal's streaming service Peacock in September 2022.

=== Sports programming ===
On November 1, 2007, KNTV entered into a three-year broadcast contract with the San Francisco Giants through 2010, replacing the team's longtime broadcaster KTVU, which had carried Giants games since 1961, three years after the team moved to the Bay Area and KTVU first began broadcasting. The team's first game broadcast on KNTV aired on April 1, 2008. KNTV broadcasts 20 to 40 Giants baseball games a year, which are produced by sister network NBC Sports Bay Area. Also, KNTV airs Giants Clubhouse each weekend during the MLB season. All of the Giants broadcasts are carried in high definition. The station has preempted Giants telecasts during the Summer Olympics due to NBC currently holding the television rights to the Olympics. The Giants' contract with KNTV concluded at the end of the 2010 season, however, the broadcast rights were renewed before the 2011 season. Thus, it is one of the few major network affiliates that carry live local MLB games to viewers in their broadcast area. As of 2022, Giants telecasts on KNTV have been simulcasts from NBC Sports Bay Area.

KNTV also occasionally runs special editions of its newscasts or Sports Sunday, to cover San Francisco 49ers NFL games that are broadcast as part of NBC Sunday Night Football. On January 23, 2014, NBCUniversal, Comcast, and the San Francisco 49ers announced a 10-year partnership that included new additions to Levi's Stadium. The partnership spans multiple business units that include KNTV, NBC Sports Bay Area, its VoiceEdge, Ethernet, and Xfinity services, as well as building a new studio only four miles (6 km) from where KNTV is based. It also produced 400 hours of programming on KNTV and NBC Sports Bay Area. KNTV was the local broadcaster for Super Bowl LX in 2026, held at Levi's Stadium.

From 2006 to 2021, KNTV aired San Jose Sharks games via the NHL on NBC; this included the team's appearance in the 2016 Stanley Cup Finals.

Since 2025, KNTV has aired select Golden State Warriors games via the NBA on NBC.

=== News operation ===
The logo for NBC Bay Area News.

KNTV presently broadcasts 37 hours, 20 minutes of locally produced newscasts each week (with 6 hours, 4 minutes each weekday; and 3 1/2 hours each on Saturdays and Sundays). The station also produces a local sports highlight and discussion program on Sunday nights called Xfinity Sports Sunday Primetime, which is hosted by sports anchor Dave Feldman during the fall, when NBC provides football coverage in prime time.

In September 1998, KNTV began producing an hour-long 10 p.m. newscast for then-WB affiliate KBWB-TV (now KOFY-TV). Upon becoming a WB affiliate in July 2000, KNTV increased its local news programming; it retained all of its existing newscasts and added two hours to its weekday morning newscast, an hour-long news and technology-focused program at noon, an additional half-hour to its 5 p.m. newscast and a simulcast of the KBWB 10 p.m. newscast. The 7–9 a.m., 5:30 and 10 p.m. newscasts were dropped once KNTV switched to NBC in January 2002.

On July 21, 2008, KNTV became the fourth station in the Bay Area (behind KGO, KTVU and KPIX) to begin broadcasting its local newscasts in high definition. For the first half of 2009, the recession forced NBC to cut costs at KNTV. Several rounds of layoffs occurred, forcing KNTV to shed some well-known personalities, including chief weather anchor John Farley, who left the station in March 2009; after Farley's departure, weekend weather segments originated from the studios of Los Angeles sister station KNBC. The station also closed news bureaus in Sacramento and Oakland. KNTV's news helicopter (which was purchased in 2006) was also suspended from use on April 30, 2009. On May 22, 2009, former NBC Weather Plus meteorologist Jeff Ranieri was named KNTV's new chief meteorologist. The year prior, on June 29, 2008, layoffs included reporters Noelle Walker, Ethan Harp, Christien Kafton, and San Jose reporter Daniel Garza, along with several behind-the-scenes jobs.

In December 2010, sports director Raj Mathai transitioned to weeknight news anchor, though he continued to host Sports Sunday for a short time after the change. On December 21, 2010, KNTV's newscasts moved to a temporary set while the main news set underwent renovations, traffic and sports reports were also done in the newsroom. Meteorologist Rob Mayeda also announced his move to the weekend evening newscast. The station added additional personnel including former KOB reporter Marla Tellez, meteorologist Nick O'Kelly, and freelance sports anchors Justin Allen and Christine Nubla (all of whom, except for Tellez, previously worked for KNTV).

On April 20, 2011, KNTV announced that Comcast SportsNet Bay Area (now NBC Sports Bay Area) would begin producing sports segments for the station starting on June 13, 2011, to be produced from a dedicated set at the cable channel's studios. This made KNTV the first NBC-owned station to have its sports segments produced by the regional sports network. On August 10, 2011, Janelle Wang replaced Jessica Aguirre as weeknight anchor of the 5 p.m. newscast. Wang and Raj Mathai are the only Asian American weekday anchor team outside of Hawaii.

On July 16, 2016, KNTV became the eighth NBC-owned station and the first station on the West Coast to begin using "Look N" graphics following seven NBC-owned stations on the East Coast which began using the new graphics in the summer of 2016. Before this, KNTV along with sister stations KNBC and KNSD revamped their websites on July 1, 2016. As of January 2017, KNTV is the only NBC-owned station and one of the two stations in the Bay Area which do not have 4 p.m. newscasts since the NBC affiliation taken over from KRON-TV in 2002. Several owned stations already have hour-long 4 p.m. newscasts. The other NBC-owned stations in New York, Miami, and Hartford began theirs in June, the stations in Los Angeles and Chicago revived theirs in the summer of 2016, and the station in Boston (then WBTS-LD) debuted theirs in January 2017.

In December 2018, the station announced that they would cut its midday newscasts to half an hour beginning on January 7, 2019, in favor of the brand new lifestyle show California LIVE; sister stations KNBC (which produces the program) and KNSD also announced their cuts on the midday newscasts for a half-hour due to the launching of the series.

From mid-March 2020 until April 17, 2020, KNTV expanded its 11 p.m. weeknight newscast to a full hour to provide expanded coverage of the COVID-19 pandemic.

In May 2021, it was announced that KNTV will move NBC Nightly News to the network recommended time of 6:30 p.m. beginning June 7 as a result of the introduction of two new newscasts at 5:30 p.m. and 7 p.m.; the former will be the third in the San Francisco Bay Area to have this (following KTVU which have theirs as a result of their expansion of its 5 p.m. newscast in April 2005 and KPIX-TV which introduced it in February 2019) and the latter will be the second station in the area to adding the 7 p.m. newscasts (following KPIX-TV which introduced their 7 p.m. newscast in February 2019). In addition, the logo was modified, with the stripes of colors used in the NBC logo was added, and the news opens was also modified with the addition of "Moving You Forward" slogan (which is introduced to complete with their competitor KGO-TV which introduced their slogan "Building a Better Bay Area" in 2020).

On July 5, 2021 (a day after Independence Day), KNTV began using "Look S" graphics after its sister station KNBC began using it a week prior to its switch and other stations in Chicago and Dallas both debuting it on June 21 and 29 respectively.

On September 12, 2022, KNTV launched a half-hour 4:30 p.m. newscast, after the East Coast edition of Nightly News airing at 4 p.m.

On September 7, 2026 (Labor Day), KNTV launched a 3 p.m. newscast after The Kelly Clarkson Show ended its run on August 31.

==== Notable current on-air staff ====
- Jessica Aguirre – anchor; also host of NBC Class Action
- Raj Mathai – anchor
- Rob Mayeda (AMS Seal of Approval) – meteorologist and host of On Thin Ice
- Scott McGrew – business and technology reporter, Tech Now producer/reporter, Press Here host/moderator and weekday anchor
- Jeff Ranieri (AMS Seal of Approval) – chief meteorologist
- Garvin Thomas – "Bay Area Proud" reporter; also fill-in anchor

==== Notable former on-air staff ====
- Chauncey Bailey – reporter (1970–1971)
- Brodie Brazil – sports anchor/reporter; NBC Sports Bay Area contributor
- Marc Brown – reporter (1985–1987)
- Allen Denton – anchor (2000–2007)
- Dave Feldman – sports anchor
- Chris Flanagan – sports anchor (2000–2004)
- T. J. Holmes – anchor (2003–2006)
- Jon Kelley – anchor (2011–2013)
- Lisa Kim – anchor (1999–2010)
- Tony Kovaleski – chief investigative reporter (2011–2015)
- Jim Kozimor – sports anchor
- David Lee – sports anchor (1993–1998)
- Jess Marlow – reporter (1960s)
- Vicky Nguyen – investigative reporter/fill-in anchor (2007–2019)
- Shannon O'Donnell – weekend/morning meteorologist (2001–2007)
- Victoria Recaño – anchor/reporter (2002)
- Ric Romero – cameraman (1977–1978)
- Ted Rowlands – reporter (1997–1999)
- Catt Sadler – entertainment reporter/host of The Bay Beat (1998–2002)
- Marla Tellez – anchor/reporter (2010–2013)

== Technical information ==
=== Subchannels ===
The station's signal is multiplexed:

Subchannels of KNTV
Subchannel	Res.	Short name	Programming
11.1	1080i	KNTV HD	NBC
11.2	480i	COZI-TV	Cozi TV
48.3	1080i	KSTS HD	Telemundo (KSTS)
48.4	480i	TeleX	TeleXitos (KSTS)
11.5	480i	CRIMES	NBC True CRMZ
4.2	480i	Antenna	Antenna TV (KRON-TV) (4:3)

Broadcast on behalf of another station

Between them, KNTV and KSTS broadcast the same five services (11.3 and 11.4 on the KSTS multiplex simulcast 11.1 and 11.2 on the KNTV multiplex and vice versa for KSTS). The two stations are not co-sited (KSTS is on Mount Allison).

=== Analog-to-digital conversion ===
KNTV ended regular programming on its analog signal, over VHF channel 11, on June 12, 2009, as part of the federally mandated transition from analog to digital television. The station's digital signal remained on its pre-transition VHF channel 12, using virtual channel 11. As part of the SAFER Act, KNTV kept its analog signal on the air until June 26 to inform viewers of the digital television transition through a loop of public service announcements from the National Association of Broadcasters. On April 29, 2020, at 1 p.m. during the FCC repack, KNTV relocated from channel 12 to channel 13.

KNTV is now the largest NBC affiliate on the VHF band—and the only NBC O&O to broadcast on VHF.

=== ATSC 3.0 ===
On March 27, 2023, KNTV began carrying Antenna TV on its multiplexed signal on behalf of KRON on channel 4.2 to help free-up KRON's RF channel 7 for ATSC 3.0 transmission. On March 29, 2023, at 10:01 a.m., KNTV and five other Bay Area stations went live on KRON's new transmitter on Sutro Tower in ATSC 3.0. With this addition of the ATSC 3.0 signal from Sutro Tower, KNTV is the only station in the Bay Area broadcasting from three different full-power transmitters, concurrently. Also, at the time of the ATSC 3.0 launch, the San Francisco Bay Area is the first and only market with all five major English networks participating via O&O stations (as well as Univision O&O KDTV). On May 5, 2023, KNTV began upconverting the ATSC 3.0 signal to Dolby Vision, becoming the first station in the market to do so. Shortly before the 2024 Summer Olympics in Paris, KNTV started broadcasting its ATSC 3.0 signal in Dolby Atmos, as well as Dolby Vision.
